= Young King (magazine) =

Japanese manga magazine

- Cover of 2009 issue no. 18
- Categories: Seinen manga
- Frequency: Semimonthly
- Circulation: 230,000 (2008)
- First issue: 1987
- Company: Shōnen Gahōsha
- Country: Japan
- Language: Japanese

Young King (Japanese: ヤングキング, Hepburn: Yangu Kingu) is a semimonthly seinen manga magazine published in Japan by Shōnen Gahōsha, aimed primarily at adult male audiences. It is the sister publication of Monthly Young King and Young King OURs and was founded in 1987 as the sister publication of the now-discontinued Shōnen King. As of 2008, the circulation was about 230,000.

== Manga artists and series featured in Young King ==
- Masao
  - Ishida & Asakura
- Hiroshi Tanaka
  - Bad Boys
- Yasuyuki Ōno
  - Yume no Kayoiji
- Yuji Shiozaki
  - Battle Club
- Ooi Masakazu
  - Okusan - Oh! My Sweet Honey!!
- Satoshi Yoshida
  - Shin Shōnan Bakusōzoku Arakure Knight (Bomber Bikers of Shonan)
- Boichi
  - Sun-Ken Rock
- Toshinori Sogabe
  - Go! Tenba Cheerleaders
  - Deban desu yo? Kondō-san!
- Katsu Aki
  - Harem Revolution
  - Daddy * Virgin
- Takashi Sano
  - Iketeru Futari
  - Usagi-chan de Cue!!
- Shohei Harumoto
  - Kirin
  - Hi! Hi! Hi!
- Q-taro Hanamizawa
  - Tsuki Suzuran Doori
  - Momoiro Sango (The Pink Coral)
  - Play!
- Masahiro Shibata
  - Sarai
- Hiromasa Okushima
  - Akira No. 2
- Yū Yūki, Sō
  - Comical Psychosomatic Medicine (ongoing)
- Yūichi Katō
  - Yancha Gal no Anjou-san (ongoing)
- Daisuke Watanabe
  - Gedō no Uta
- Hiroshi Tanaka
  - Kippo
- Nokuto Koike
  - Tonari No Jii-San (ongoing)

== Related magazines ==
- Young King OURs
- Young Comic
