= Futari no Ouchi =

Japanese manga series

- First tankōbon volume cover

ふたりのおうち
- Genre: Erotic romance
- Manga
- Written by: Tsuya Tsuya
- Published by: Shōnen Gahōsha
- Imprint: Young King Comics
- Magazine: Young Comic
- Original run: August 10, 2016 – April 10, 2019
- Volumes: 4

Futari no Ouchi (ふたりのおうち) is a Japanese manga series written and illustrated by Tsuya Tsuya. It was serialized in Shōnen Gahōsha's Young Comic magazine from August 2016 to April 2019.

== Publication ==
Written and illustrated by Tsuya Tsuya, Futari no Ouchi was serialized in Shōnen Gahōsha's Young Comic magazine from August 10, 2016, to April 10, 2019. Shōnen Gahōsha collected its chapters in four tankōbon volumes, released from May 30, 2017, to May 30, 2019.

=== Volumes ===
No.	Release date	ISBN
1	May 30, 2017	978-4-7859-6021-6
2	February 20, 2018	978-4-7859-6162-6
3	September 29, 2018	978-4-7859-6294-4
4	May 30, 2019	978-4-7859-6443-6

== See also ==
- Mikazuki ga Waratteru, another manga series by the same author
- Rakujitsu no Pathos, another manga series by the same author
- Shiori's Diary, another manga series by the same author
