= Iketeru Futari =

Japanese manga and anime series

- Cover of the first tankōbon volume of Iketeru Futari, featuring Keisuke Saji (left) and Akira Koizumi (right)

イケてる2人 (The Cool Couple)
- Genre: Romantic comedy; Sex comedy
- Manga
- Written by: Takashi Sano
- Published by: Shōnen Gahōsha
- Magazine: Young King
- Original run: 1997 – April 26, 2010
- Volumes: 33
- Manga

Iketeru Keiji
- Written by: Takashi Sano
- Published by: Shōnen Gahōsha
- Magazine: Young King Bessatsu Kingdom; (1998–2004); Young King; (2005–2006)
- Original run: 1998 – 2006
- Volumes: 9
- Anime television series
- Directed by: Takeshi Yamaguchi
- Music by: Moka
- Studio: J.C.Staff
- Original network: TBS
- Original run: February 2, 1999 – February 26, 1999
- Episodes: 16
- Live-action film
- Directed by: Wataru Oku
- Studio: GP Museum Soft
- Released: October 2, 2009
- Runtime: 79 minutes

Iketeru Futari (イケてる2人; lit. 'The Cool Couple') is a Japanese manga series written and illustrated by Takashi Sano. It was serialized in the Shōnen Gahōsha magazine Young King Comics from 1997 to 2010.

An anime television series adaptation by J.C.Staff aired on TBS in February 1999. A live-action theatrical film version was released in October 2009.

== Plot ==
Sixteen-year-old Keisuke Saji loves to fantasize about young beautiful women. He hopes to land the object of his affection, Akira Koizumi. Koizumi is a classic tsundere, switching between violence towards Saji and affection. While most guys take Koizumi's cold shoulder as a hint, Saji pursues head-on without having rejection faze him.

== Characters ==
Keisuke Saji (佐次京介, Saji Keisuke)
Voiced by: Shigeru Shibuya
Saji is a 16-year-old high school student with spiky hair who loves everything about women.
Akira Koizumi (小泉明, Koizumi Akira)
Voiced by: Kae Araki
Koizumi is a young girl with blue hair and red eyes. Her looks and figure has the guys in school turning their heads, including Saji. However, Koizumi expresses her rejections from the proposals of the boys by physically assaulting them. Out of all the guys she meets, Saji is her favorite target to take her frustrations out on.
Yuki Umemiya (梅宮悠樹, Umemiya Yuki)
Voiced by: Miho Yamada
Yuki is Saji's busty childhood friend and somewhat an unintentional rival to Koizumi. Yuki has grown well-proportioned and shapely. However, her charm and body, while still able to make guys drool, are not as effective as Koizumi grace and mystery. Despite her appearance, she has very low self-esteem.
Ryoko Arigase (蟻賀瀬涼子, Arigase Ryoko)
Voiced by: Ayumi Furuyama
One of Koizumi's friends, Ryoko has long purple hair. She tends to remain calm despite whatever is going on around her.
Maki Amakasu (甘糟真希, Amakasu Maki)
Voiced by: Tomoe Hanba
Another of Koizumi's friends, Maki has brown hair either short or in pigtails. She tends to be a bit more high-strung than Ryoko.
Misa Kuroki (黒木美紗, Kuroki Misa)
Voiced by: Ritsuko Kasai
Koizumi's lesbian friend who behaves as if they were former lovers. She is part of a small circle of friends who sell themselves to men with usually perverse intentions, Koizumi having become a part of the group for a while in her search for acceptance.
Noboru Hitachi (日立のぼる, Hitachi Noboru)
Voiced by: Kazuya Ichijō
Apparently an old friend of Saji and Yuki. Both he and Saji joined the basketball team at the same time to pick up girls.
Kaneto Sakurai (桜井兼人, Sakurai Kaneto)
Voiced by: Yūko Gotō
Sakurai is a young boy who is gay. He is the same height as Koizumi.
Katsunori Urawa (浦和克典, Urawa Katsunori)
Voiced by: Yuuki Matsuda
One of Saji's classmates who wears glasses. He encourages Saji to go forward with his declaration of love for Koizumi, despite everything backfiring on him.
Susumu Kuwabara (桑原 進, Kuwabara Susumu)
Voiced by: Shingo Tanabe
One of Saji's classmates who has brown hair. Like Urawa, he encourage Saji to go forward with his declaration of love for Koizumi.

== Media ==
=== Manga ===
Iketeru Futari, written and illustrated by Takashi Sano, was serialized in Shōnen Gahōsha's Young King magazine from 1997 to April 26, 2010. It has been collected in thirty-three tankōbon volumes.

A spinoff manga series titled Iketeru Keiji (イケてる刑事) was serialized in Young King separate volume Kingdom from 1998 to 2004 and then in Young King Comics from 2005 to 2006. It has been collected in nine tankōbon volumes.

==== Volume list ====
===== Iketeru Futari =====
No.	Japanese release date	Japanese ISBN
1	August 1, 1997	978-4-78-591590-2
2	January 1, 1998	978-4-78-591816-3
3	June 1, 1998	978-4-78-591848-4
4	November 1, 1998	978-4-78-591879-8
5	February 1, 1999	978-4-78-591893-4
6	July 1, 1999	978-4-78-591926-9
7	January 1, 2000	978-4-78-591967-2
8	May 1, 2000	978-4-78-591992-4
9	September 1, 2000	978-4-78-592027-2
10	April 1, 2001	978-4-78-592073-9
11	October 1, 2001	978-4-78-592132-3
12	February 14, 2002	978-4-78-592161-3
13	June 5, 2002	978-4-78-592196-5
14	December 18, 2002	978-4-78-592264-1
15	May 1, 2003	978-4-78-592308-2
16	November 28, 2003	978-4-78-592376-1
17	April 12, 2004	978-4-78-592411-9
18	September 9, 2004	978-4-78-592463-8
19	January 19, 2005	978-4-78-592503-1
20	April 8, 2005	978-4-78-592525-3
21	July 27, 2005	978-4-78-592559-8
22	December 28, 2005	978-4-78-592596-3
23	June 9, 2006	978-4-78-592650-2
24	December 11, 2006	978-4-78-592726-4
25	May 9, 2007	978-4-78-592776-9
26	September 25, 2007	978-4-78-592855-1
27	February 1, 2008	978-4-78-592919-0
28	September 10, 2008	978-4-78-593021-9
29	February 19, 2009	978-4-78-593110-0
30	August 24, 2009	978-4-78-593215-2
31	December 24, 2009	978-4-78-593283-1
32	February 19, 2010	978-4-78-593320-3
33	September 1, 2010	978-4-78-593459-0

===== Iketeru Keiji =====
No.	Japanese release date	Japanese ISBN
1	December 1, 1999	978-4-78-591959-7
2	October 1, 2000	978-4-78-592033-3
3	June 1, 2001	978-4-78-592092-0
4	April 10, 2002	978-4-78-592175-0
5	October 30, 2002	978-4-78-592245-0
6	July 9, 2003	978-4-78-592327-3
7	January 16, 2004	978-4-78-592386-0
8	November 10, 2004	978-4-78-592481-2
9	April 26, 2006	978-4-78-592636-6

=== Anime ===
An anime television series adaptation aired on TBS from February 2 to February 26, 1999. The series was produced by J.C.Staff and directed by Takeshi Yamaguchi, with Ryoichi Oki designing the characters, and Moka composing the music. Yuki Kimura performed the theme "Fall in YOU".

No.	Title	Original release date
1	"SOS! Alice in Shibuya"; Transliteration: "Esuōesu! Shibuya de Arisu ♡" (Japanese: SOS! 渋谷でアリス♡)	February 2, 1999
2	"Throb to the Beat, Wobbling Breasts"; Transliteration: "Bīto de pikkun, kyonyū de purun" (Japanese: ビートでピックン, 巨乳でプルン)	February 3, 1999
3	"Squishy Squishy and Wobble Wobble"; Transliteration: "Pu ~ ripuri ~ no ku ~ raku-ra ~" (Japanese: プ~リプリ~のく~らくら~)	February 4, 1999
4	"At Last, the Bed..."; Transliteration: "Semete beddode..." (Japanese: せめてベッドで...)	February 5, 1999
5	"Watch Out for the Lovers' Sudden Kiss"; Transliteration: "Abunai koibito? Ikinari de chu ~" (Japanese: アブナイ恋人? いきなりでチュ~)	February 9, 1999
6	"Can't Feel Any Worse? Get More Panties!"; Transliteration: "Tsuishi ga fukeba, panti ga mo ~ karu?" (Japanese: 追試が吹けば, パンティがも~かる?)	February 10, 1999
7	"Broke Up! A Prickling Attack Helps... Right?"; Transliteration: "Zekkō! Ni wa chikuchiku kōgeki ga... Chiku?" (Japanese: 絶交! にはチクチク攻撃が... チク?)	February 11, 1999
8	"Sweet Heart Valentine Special"; Transliteration: "Suu~īto hāto Barentain supesharu" (Japanese: スウィート・ハート バレンタイン・スペシャル)	February 12, 1999
9	"Initiative! Koizumi Akira's Night of Burning Passion!"; Transliteration: "Sente! Koizumi Akira no moeru yoru ♡" (Japanese: 先手! 小泉明の萌える夜♡)	February 16, 1999
10	"Everyone's Idol, Sakurai-Kun"; Transliteration: "Min'na no aidoru, Sakurai-kun ♡ pao" (Japanese: みんなのアイドル、桜井くん♡パォ)	February 17, 1999
11	"Good Times with the Kotatsu! The Night of Kitty Print"; Transliteration: "Kotatsu de gu 〜! Nyankopurinto no yoru" (Japanese: コタツでグ〜! ニャンコプリントの夜)	February 18, 1999
12	"Pajama Party - Fly Into Outer Space!!"; Transliteration: "Pajama pātī uchū e tobe!!" (Japanese: パジャマ・パーティー 宇宙へ翔べ!!)	February 19, 1999
13	"Wet Hunt, Amakasu's Tale"; Transliteration: "Nure teru tantei, Amakasu monogatari" (Japanese: ヌレてる探偵, 甘糟物語)	February 23, 1999
14	"Memories, Punyo Punyo. A Challenge from the Unknown!"; Transliteration: "Omo Hide, punyopunyo michi kara no chōsen!" (Japanese: おもひで, ぷにょぷにょ未知からの挑戦!)	February 24, 1999
15	"The World's Greatest Kidnapping: Where to, Koizumi?"; Transliteration: "Shijō saidai no yū waku ♡ Koizumi yo doko e?" (Japanese: 史上最大のゆうわく♡小泉よ何処へ?)	February 25, 1999
16	"Cheers to the Good Couple!"; Transliteration: "Saishūkai Ike Teru futari ni hanataba o!" (Japanese: 最終回 イケてる2人に花束を!)	February 26, 1999

=== Live-action film ===
A live-action film adaptation was produced by GP Museum Soft and directed by Wataru Oku. It received a theatrical release in Tokyo's Cinemart Roppongi from October 2 to October 4, 2009.
