= Akira No. 2 =

Japanese manga series

- Cover of the first volume of Akira No. 2 as published by Shōnen Gahōsha

アキラNo.2
- Manga
- Written by: Hiromasa Okushima
- Published by: Shōnen Gahōsha
- Magazine: Young King
- Original run: 2012 – 2014
- Volumes: 6
- Live-action film
- Released: 2014

Akira No. 2 (アキラNo.2) is a Japanese manga series written and illustrated by Hiromasa Okushima. It was serialized between 2012 and 2014 in Shōnen Gahōsha's Young King magazine. It was adapted into a live action film that was released in the fall of 2014 in Japan.

== Plot ==
Akira, the main character, is trying his best to become the strongest in his high school, not in terms of intelligence but through fighting since this high school revolves around fighting for the top spot instead of education. Even teachers can't resist the fighting and are nearly forced to overlook the violence. Akira wants to dethrone the current No.1 Tsutomu but to get there he has to take on a few more challengers since most of them want to take the spot for themselves.

== Characters ==
- Akira (Ryota Ozawa)
- Tsutomu (Yasuhiro Kidō)

== Release ==
No.	Japanese release date	Japanese ISBN
1	January 29, 2013	978-4-7859-4009-6
2	October 28, 2013	978-4-7859-5147-4
3	January 27, 2014	978-4-7859-5208-2
4	May 26, 2014	978-4-7859-5293-8
5	September 22, 2014	978-4-7859-5293-8
6	December 22, 2014	978-4-7859-5293-8
