= List of Excel Saga chapters =

First volume cover, released in Japan by Shōnen Gahosha in April 1997

This is a list of the chapters and volumes of the manga series Excel Saga by Rikdo Koshi. The chapters were published in Shōnen Gahosha's Young King Ours from 1996 to 2011. The individual chapters are collected and published in 27 tankōbon volumes by Shōnen Gahosha between April 1997 and October 2011. A 26-episode anime television series adaptation by J.C.Staff aired on TV Tokyo from October 7, 1999, to March 30, 2000.

Viz Media licensed Excel Saga for an English language release in North America in 2003. Viz released the first volume on August 13, 2003, and the last on January 14, 2014. It is also licensed for regional language releases in France by Kabuto and in Italy by Dynit.

A 60-page one-shot was publishes in Young King OURs on December 28, 2021, to celebrate the series' 25th anniversary.

== Volumes ==
No.	Original release date	Original ISBN	English release date	English ISBN
1	April 1997	978-4-7859-1565-0	August 13, 2003	978-1-56931-988-8
Mission 1: "The Initiation of a Legend" (起動する伝説, Kidō suru densetsu); Mission 2: "Today and Tomorrow for Farewells" (別れの為の昨日と今日, Wakare no tame no kinō to kyō); Mission 3: "Today and Tomorrow for Encounters" (出会いの為の今日と明日, Deai no tame no kyō to ashita); Mission 4: "Everyday Living Permissible" (許された日常, Yurusa reta nichijō); Mission 5: "Those That Burn, Those That Get Burned" (燃やす者 焦がれる者, Moyasu mono kogareru mono); Mission 6: "The (Untreatable) Unbeknownst Disease" (不知の病, Fuchi no yamai); Mission 7: "A Night of Necessary Evil" (必要悪の夜, Hitsuyō aku no yoru)
Introduces the main cast of characters including Excel, Hyatt, and Il Palazzo. Excel, Hyatt, and their dog Menchi live in the same apartment complex as supporting characters such as next door neighbor, Tooru Watanabe, who has a crush on Hyatt, and Daimaru Sumiyoshi and Norikuni Iwata.
2	December 1997	978-4-7859-1811-8	September 3, 2003	978-1-56931-989-5
Mission 1: "Destinies at the Crossroads" (運命の接点, Unmei no setten); Mission 2: "The Opening Winds" (始まりの風, Hajimari no kaze); Mission 3: "The Relative Speed of Fools" (愚者達の相対速度, Gusha-tachi no sōtai sokudo); Mission 4: "An Equation for Liberation" (解放の方程式, Kaihō no hōteishiki); Mission 5: "Victims and Perpetrators" (被害者と加害者, Higaisha to kagai-sha); Mission 6: "Shift in Tact" (風向き, Kazamuki); Mission 7: "Unhappy Happiness" (不幸せな幸福, Fushiawasena kōfuku); Mission 8: "The Joys of Defeat" (敗者の喜び, Haisha no yorokobi)
Introduces Dr. Kabapu, head of the Department of Environmental Security. Kabapu hires Iwata, Sumiyoshi and Watanabe into his staff and later Misaki Matsuya who joins them at a training retreat. This includes sentai suits and prototype laser guns. All the while Excel and Hyatt trade time between working part time jobs and doing missions for Il Palazzo.
3	July 1998	978-4-7859-1854-5	November 12, 2003	978-1-56931-990-1
Mission 1: "Chose Broken" (壊れて選べ, Kowarete erabe); Mission 2: "Uninhibited Electronic Signals" (自由な電波, Jiyūna denpa); Mission 3: "The Shape of White Color" (白色のかたち, Hakushoku no katachi); Mission 4: "The Looking Glass of Delicate Bubbles" (うたかたの万華鏡, Utakata no mangekyō); Mission 5: "That Which Scatters About in the White Skies" (散るものは白く空に, Chiru mono wa shiroku sora ni); Mission 6: "He Who Does Not Open the Treasure Box Himself" (彼は玉手箱を開けない, Kare wa tamatebako o hirakenai); Mission 7: "'We Came... We Left.'" (来た...去った, Kita... satta)
Excel and Hyatt jump from job to job. From working on a mayoral campaign to trying to sign people to cell phone contracts. The two also go undercover at a hospital to report to Il Palazzo about the state of health care in the city. This manga we also learn that Norikuni Iwata is the cousin to Dr. Sekifumi Iwata. Also Dr. Kabapu sends his team into the sewer to search out "suspicious things" and they are met with weird happenings such as falling cage doors and gushes of water. Unbeknownst to them Excel and Hyatt are trying to ward them out of the sewers because they are too close to their headquarters.
4	December 1998	978-4-7859-1884-2	December 13, 2003	978-1-59116-110-3
Mission 1: "Unforeseen Choices" (見えない選択, Mienai sentaku); Mission 2: "How to Consume Oxygen" (酸素の使い道, Sanso no tsukaimichi); Mission 3: "'The Smearing Bug's...'" (沁みいる虫の..., Shimi iru mushi no...); Mission 4: "23 Hours, 56 Minutes, and 4 Seconds in the Life of Dr. Kabapu" (博士の23時間56分4秒, Hakase no 23-jikan 56-bu 4-byō); Mission 5: "The Season Faraway from the Sun" (太陽の遠い季節, Taiyō no tōi kisetsu); Mission 6: "Into the Labyrinth" (迷路へ, Meiro e); Mission 7: "The Path You Lead Alone" (ひとりきりでたどる道, Hitori kiri de tadoru michi); Mission 8: "The Ocean and the Sky as Dangerous Weapons" (海と空が凶器, Umi to sora ga kyōki)
Il Palazzo's strange habits continue and Matsuya lies for the team to avoid them returning to the sewers. This caps off volume 4 as Hyatt gets kidnapped, Excel goes to the dentist, we meet Kabapu's new secretary Momochi, everyone goes to the pool and Watanabe gets sick and is rushed to the hospital. As well as Excel having brief amnesia and Watanabe hunting Iwata down for using permanent marker on his face while he was out at the hospital.
5	September 1999	978-4-7859-1941-2	March 3, 2004	978-1-59116-136-3
Mission 1: "The White Album" (白いアルバム, Shiroi arubamu); Mission 2: "Shallow Wound Entertainment" (傷の浅い娯楽, Kizu no asai goraku); Mission 3: "The Beautiful Force" (きれいな力, Kireina chikara); Mission 4: "The Dreams of the Dolls" (人形の夢たち, Ningyō no yume-tachi); Mission 5: "Just Come Back" (還るだけ, Kaeru dake); Mission 6: "The String-Puller" (糸をひく者, Ito o hiku mono); Mission 7: "And the One That Dances" (踊るもの, Odoru mono); Bonus Mission: "The Spring Programming Special" (春の番組, Haru no bangumi)
Volume 5 features first appearance of Mr. Owner when Excel and Hyatt briefly work at a cabin lodge. Also supporting character Prof. Shiouji and the Ropponmatsu robots (I & II). Also Iwata tries to get Matsuya's attention on Valentines day and Excel finds a pistol and tries to get rid of it.
6	May 2000	978-4-7859-1993-1	May 5, 2004	978-1-59116-231-5
Mission 1: "Mirrors and Eyes" (鏡と瞳, Kagami to hitomi); Mission 2: "Friend of the Herbivores" (草食の味方, Sōshoku no mikata); Mission 3: "The Parallel Everyday" (平行な日常, Heikōna nichijō); Mission 4: "The Resistance Value of a Gaze" (視線の抵抗値, Shisen no teikō-chi); Mission 5: "Fragment of a Body" (からだのかけら, Karada no kake-ra); Mission 6: "One Look With You" (ひとめあなたと, Hito-me anata to); Mission 7: "That Won't Return" (それは還らない, Sore wa kaeranai)
Ropponmatsu (I/II) moves into the apartment complex where her co-workers live. Excel and Hyatt run into a little girl named Hiyako who they have to ditch because she's being chased by mysterious men in black. Excel and Hyatt also have a run into Ropponmatsu.
7	February 2001	978-4-7859-2065-4	July 14, 2004	978-1-59116-232-2
Mission 1: "A Foul Deed in Springtime" (春の背信, Haru no haishin); Mission 2: "In the Midst of Drama" (戯曲の中, Gikyoku no naka); Mission 3: "Scars Upon a Dream" (夢幻の痕, Mugen no ato); Mission 4: "Wings to Eternity (T-Minus)" (永遠の翼(前編), Eien no tsubasa (zenpen)); Mission 5: "Wings to Eternity (T-Plus)" (永遠の翼(後編), Eien no tsubasa (kōhen)); Mission 6: "They Saw It" (彼女らは見た, Kanojora wa mita); Mission 7: "My Youth In ____________" (我が青春のそれ, Waga seishun no sore); Mission 8: "When Jaa, Ne Comes Marching Home" (戦士の帰還, Senshi no kikan)
Excel and Hyatt sale Ramen at the Cherry Festival where Kabapu and his subordinates are attending. Sumiyoshi reveals to his friends he collects dating sims. Excel enters the Birdman by the Sea contest to try and earn money. Also Il Palazzo sends Excela and Hyatt to a location to locate a third member. Excel and Hyatt also have to get away from immigration officers after they flee an explosion at a hotel in a foreign airplane.
8	September 2001	978-4-7859-2126-2	August 31, 2004	978-1-59116-233-9
Mission 1: "Hold Your Breath and Wait for Me" (呼吸を止めて待っていて, Kokyū o tomete matte ite); Mission 2: "Two Shadows" (影ふたつ, Kage futatsu); Mission 3: "The Reality Called Illusion" (夢幻という現実, Mugen to iu genjitsu); Mission 4: "Farewell Leader" (さらばリーダー, Saraba rīdā); Mission 5: "Screw and Gear" (螺子と歯車, Neji to haguruma); Mission 6: "A Long Day in a Small World" (小さな世界の長い一日, Chīsana sekai no nagai tsuitachi); Mission 7: "Like a Rope in the Making" (糾う縄の様に, Azanau nawa no yō ni); Mission 8: "Burnable and Nonburnable Trash" (燃える塵 燃えない塵, Moeru chiri moenai chiri)
Ilpalazzo introduces ACROSS' third hire, Elgala, to Excel and Hyatt. Elgala's presence and her rebellious nature lead to more tension for Excel and also cause conflict between Excel and Hyatt. Due to these personnel changes, Ilpalazzo disburses a large amount of funds for his hirelings' use, leading to an encounter between them and bank security staff. Meanwhile, City Hall is in shock over the sudden death and robotic resurrection of Iwata, who died of colon cancer, and who is now housed in Ropponmatsu I's body until a permanent replacement can be prepared. A sudden fire engulfs the apartment building, and both ACROSS and the Environmental Security Administration must find new accommodations.
9	June 28, 2002	978-4-7859-2205-4	November 16, 2004	978-1-59116-234-6
Outer Mission: "The Wild West Detective Saw in the Midst of Smoke on the Water Various Cases of Midnight Murder in the Secret Trick Room While Dangerously Dancing at the Stray Sun Series Story" (太陽に踊るあぶないはぐれ西部ケイ事貴ゾク物語旅情編トリック密室連続殺人事件24時湯煙の中にいろいろ見た!, Taiyō ni odoru abunai hagure seibu kei koto ki zoku monogatari ryojō-hen torikku misshitsu renzoku satsujin jiken 24-ji yukemuri no naka ni iroiro mita!); Mission 1: "Density of the Protagonist" (主人公密度, Shujinkō mitsudo); Mission 2: "Crystal Locale" (結晶の行方, Kesshō no yukue); Mission 3: "Is Life Worth More Than the Stars?" (星よりも重い生命?, Hoshi yori mo omoi seimei?); Mission 4: "The Prison of Happiness" (幸せの牢獄, Shiawase no rōgoku); Mission 5: "We Will Find Each Other Again if We Return to That Town" (あの街へ還ればきっと逢える, Ano machi e kaereba kitto aeru)
Excel, Hyatt, Elgala, and Menchi move into their new hideout, an apartment building owned by Kabapu. Ilpalazzo performs medical investigations on Hyatt and is mildly displeased at the results, while Watanabe, Matsuya and Sumiyoshi speculate about Iwata's return. Ilpalazzo orders his agents to proclaim ACROSS' intentions to the masses, but Excel and Hyatt are intercepted in this task by Kabapu's new weapon. This weapon quickly goes on a rampage downtown, meanwhile Kabapu activates "The Plan" and reveals more of the true nature of the organization to his subordinates.
10	December 2002	978-4-7859-2268-9	January 11, 2005	978-1-59116-644-3
Mission 1: "Sometimes Weak and Sometimes Fragile" (弱かったり儚かったり, Yowakattari kurakattari); Mission 2: "Of the Powerless Mind" (力なき心, Chikara naki kokoro); Mission 3: "99.9% Dense" (濃度99.9%, Nōdo 99. 9-pāsento); Mission 4: "The Heart is Gold?" (黄金の心?, Kogane no kokoro?); Mission 5: "Even God Feels the Pain" (神でも痛い, Kami demo itai); Bonus Mission: "The Summer Programming Special" (夏の番組, Natsu no bangumi)
Excel and company attempt to reach out to the ignorant masses at a shopping mall but are again thwarted by Kabapu's forces. Excel begins to feel her position in ACROSS undermined and takes a period of leave. Sumiyoshi's family is introduced, much to his colleagues' surprise. During her absence, Elgala and Hyatt attempt to propagandize at a soccer match, but are forced to retreat under pressure from Iwata. Excel returns to salvage the situation, and the girls celebrate with sake given to Hyatt by Watanabe. They awake hung-over and discover that their bank account has mysteriously emptied overnight.
11	October 24, 2003	978-4-7859-2367-9	March 15, 2005	978-1-59116-722-8
Mission 1: "Elgala Saga" (エルガーラ·サーガ, Erugāra Sāga); Mission 2: "Money Come, Money Go" (天下のまわりもの, Tenka no mawari mono); Mission 3: "Certain Things One Can't Do" (できないこと, Dekinai koto); Mission 4: "Stupid Struggle of the Wind" (風の駄苦闘, Kaze no-da kutō); Mission 5: "Safe Wild Land" (安全な荒野, Anzen'na kōya); Mission 6: "Across Underground Uncovered" (ひみつ組織アクロスのひみつ, Himitsu soshiki Akurosu no himitsu); Mission 7: "Courage and Pebbles" (勇気と石ころ, Yūki to ishikoro); Mission 8: "God's Work" (神様のお仕事, Kamisama no oshigoto)
Elgala is forced to recount how she spent the agents' ¥10 million: on a sleep-walking night on the town. The agents are forced to take part time jobs to recoup the loss. Watanabe endeavors to assist Hyatt, but must turn to help from Kabapu—at "very reasonable rates of usury." An office ski trip turns almost deadly for Matsuya and Iwata, but is certainly deadly for the former's pride. The ACROSS agents contemplate new uniforms and aspects of the organization secret even from them. Kabapu and Shioji clash over the use and design of the Ropponmatsu units, and ACROSS inaugurates a bombing campaign to spur the city into action.
12	June 4, 2004	978-4-7859-2427-0	May 17, 2005	978-1-59116-775-4
Side Story: "Professor, We Have a Problem!" (教授!大変です!, Kyōju! Taihendesu!); Side Story: "Professor, You Have a Phone Call!" (教授!お電話です!, Kyōju! O denwadesu!); Side Story: "Professor, Your Friend is Here!" (教授!お友達です!, Kyōju! O tomodachi desu!); Side Story: "Professor, Let's Have a Moon Viewing Party!" (教授!お月見です!, Kyōju! O tsukimi desu!); Side Story: "Professor, It's Valentine's Day!" (教授!バレンタインデーです!, Kyōju! Barentain dē desu!); Mission 1: "A Lawless Woman" (無法な女, Muhōna on'na); Mission 2: "How Many Pages of the Book of Life are Devoted to Youth?" (青春は何ページ, Seishun wa nan Pēji); Mission 3: "Her and That Guy's Circumstances" (彼と少女の事情, Kare to shōjo no jijō); Mission 4: "Plain so Lay" (大洋が○っぱい, Taiyō ga ￮ ppai); Mission 5: "Work for Humans" (人間のお仕事, Ningen no oshigoto)
Dr. Kabapu reflects on the recent terrorist bombing campaign and how it has actually improved the city, but also on how much he needs to find Shioji's father Tenmangu, which will require an unpleasant meeting with Shioji's mother. The agents of ACROSS meanwhile summer at the coast, working at beach-shack owned by "The Manager." Iwata, Matsuya, Ropponmatsu, Sumiyoshi, and Watanabe also visit the beach, leading to Watanabe's being lost at sea with Hyatt. A collection of "side stories" at the start of the VIZ edition star Shioji and his cousin, Umi Rengaya. In these, Shioji's past, character, and relationship with his family are explored.
13	December 27, 2004	978-4-7859-2496-6	August 16, 2005	978-1-4215-0143-7
Mission 1: "Vanishing as Subject and Object" (消えて消して, Kiete keshite); Mission 2: "On a Created Planet" (作られた星, Tsukurareta hoshi); Mission 3: "This is Not a Figment of Your Imagination" (それは幻ではない, Sore wa maboroshi de wanai); Mission 4: "The Great Wide Tower" (広い巨塔, Hiroi kyotō); Mission 5: "A Few Words I'd Like to Convey to You" (あなたに伝えたいいくつかの言葉, Anata ni tsutaetai ikutsu ka no kotoba); Mission 6: "Alliance in the Park" (公園同盟, Kōen dōmei); Outer Mission: "Say Hello to the Outbreak from the Clinic of the Super Doctor B.J. in White" (振り返れば白いスーパーDR. BJ診療所によろしく!アウトブレク, Furikaereba shiroi Sūpā DR. BJ shinryōsho ni yoroshiku! Autobureku)
Shioji's mother, Dr. Miwa Rengaya, surprises him by returning from Illinois and resuming residence at the family institute. The agents of ACROSS attempt to spread the word to a passing television crew but are preemted by Ilpalazzo's public proclamation of ACROSS' ownership of the city. Kabapu is spurred by this to reveal his origins and true mission to his subordinates. Excel and company stage a daring but failed raid on City Hall to capture Ropponmatsu Unit 1 for Ilpalazzo. Dr. Rengaya and Kabpu consult over tea, while Shioji rifles through his mother's files for clues to his father's research and location. He later forms a secret alliance with Matsuya.
14	June 27, 2005	978-4-7859-2546-8	April 11, 2006	978-1-4215-0481-0
Mission 1: "Fire Above, Flood Below" (上は大火事 下は洪水, Ue wa dai kaji-ka wa kōzui); Mission 2: "Shameful Miracle" (恥ずかしい奇跡, Hazukashī kiseki); Mission 3: "The Lonely Lovers" (愛はふたりぼっち, Ai wa futari botchi); Mission 4: "I've Been Working on the Railroad" (線路は続くよ どこまでも, Senro wa tsudzuku yo doko made mo); Mission 5: "Death at Kuroyama-Les-Bains" (温泉殺人事件, Onsen satsujin jiken); Mission 5.5: "Little House on the Big Sea" (大海原の小さな家, Daikaigen no chīsanaka); Mission 6: "Mon., Mon., Mon., Tue., Wed., Thur., Thur., and Thur." (月月月火水木木木, Gattsuki getsukasui moku kigi)
The girls' cover (and apartment) are explosively blown, leading to a bath-house confrontation with Kabapu's forces. In order to draw their attention and let Hyatt escape, Excel and Elgala flee, taking Iwata and Ropponmatsu Unit 2 in pursuit. Nevertheless, Hyatt is captured and, in an amnesiac state, placed under Watanabe's care, with potentially dire effects on the latter's career. Her coworkers escape to the coast, where they are pressed into the service of "Mr. Owner" and "The Manager" on their floating resort, eventually ending up in an immigration detention center. Kabapu takes a vacation at a hot-spring, but is rudely interrupted by a murder mystery and local police.
15	December 28, 2005	978-4-7859-2598-7	December 12, 2006	978-1-4215-0846-7
Mission 1: "Happy Revolution" (幸福革命, Kōfuku kakumei); Mission 2: "Lord Il Palazzo's Big Day Out" (イルパラッツォの大冒険, Iru Parattsu no dai bōken); Mission 3: "Preach Me the Gospel" (福音をください, Fukuin o kudasai); Mission 4: "Forbidden Ground" (禁域, Kin-iki); Mission 5: "The Visible Machine" (機械の視界, Kikai no shikai); Mission 6: "Glory, Light, Shadows, and Things Like That" (栄光とか光とか影とか, Eikō toka hikari toka kage toka)
Disrupting Watanabe's plan for romance, Ilpalazzo personally intervenes to restore Hyatt's memory and rescue her from captivity. With her at hand, and trailed by Kabapu's agents, Ilpalazzo tours the streets of Fukuoka. After a brief meeting with Kabapu, Ilpalazzo teleporting away with Hyatt and later takes Ropponmatsu Unit 1. Excel and Elgala are marooned on a desert isle, but Ilpalazzo again intervenes to deliver Elgala from danger. Excel, however, must fend for herself in her return to Fukuoka. Months later, Kabapu frets over the failing search for Ropponmatsu and sees his wealth and political influence challenged subtly by a disruptive new electronics and retail firm: ILL, which inspires fanaticism in its employees and addiction in its customers. A social event reveals to Kabapu the leadership of this firm: its chairman, Ilpalazzo, and president, a returned and focused Excel.
16	July 26, 2006	978-4-7859-2663-2	September 11, 2007	978-1-4215-1347-8
Mission 1: "Perhaps Everyone is a Slave" (多分みんな奴隷, Tabun min'na dorei); Mission 2: "Your Voice" (あなたの聲が, Anata no koe ga); Mission 3: "Zero Meters Above Sea Level" (海抜零M, Kaibatsu rei M); Mission 4: "Stomach of Chaos" (戦士の胃, Senshi no i); Mission 5: "The Era of Black and White" (白と黒の時代, Shiro to kuro no jidai); Mission 6: "Behind Shadow, an Extraordinary Being" (陰に籠もってもの凄く, In ni komotte monosugoku)
17	January 26, 2007	978-4-7859-2742-4	March 11, 2008	978-1-4215-1874-9
Mission 1: "Aim for the Top" (トップを攫え!, Toppu o sarae!); Mission 2: "Education" (教育, Kyōiku); Mission 3: "Borrowed Thing" (かりたもの, Karita mono); Mission 4: "The Meaning of the Mustache" (髭の理, Hige no ri); Mission 5: "Overloaded City" (過負荷都市, Ka fuka toshi)
18	July 30, 2007	978-4-7859-2825-4	December 9, 2008	978-1-4215-2155-8
Mission 1: "G-i-v-e Me a Secret" (秘密く·だ·さ·い, Himitsu ku·da·sa·i); Mission 2: "Those Who Do Not Want to be Selected" (選ばれたくない人達, Eraba retakunai hitotachi); Mission 3: "The Girl With Curly Hair Who Leapt Through Time" (時をかける巻き毛, Tokiwokakeru makike); Mission 4: "The Girl With Curly Hair by the Window" (窓際の巻き毛, Madogiwa no makike); Mission 5: "Single-Seater" (定員一名, Teiin ichi mei); Mission 6: "Half Organic" (有機半分, Yūki hanbun); Mission 7: "Love is All" (愛こそすべて, Ai koso subete)
19	February 8, 2008	978-4-7859-2914-5	June 9, 2009	978-1-4215-2586-0
Mission 1: "Just When You're Feeling Weak, Here Comes a Kick, a Bee, a Curse and God Knows What Else" (弱り目に蹴りと蜂と祟りとその他, Yowarime ni keri to hachi to tatari to sonohoka); Mission 2: "The Despair of White Copper (4.8 Grams, 22.6 Millimeters Diameter)" (白銅4.8g·直径22.6mmの絶望, Hakudō 4.8g· chokkei 22.6mm no zetsubō); Mission 3: "Run, Mince!" (走れメンチ, Hashire Menchi); Mission 4: "The Diary of Somebody" (誰かの日記, Dareka no nikki); Mission 5: "Two Wheels" (車輪ふたつ, Sharin futatsu); Mission 6: "A Public Bomb" (公共爆弾, Kōkyō bakudan)
20	May 19, 2008	978-4-7859-2963-3	December 8, 2009	978-1-4215-2782-6
Mission 1: Two People and One Pet (二人と一匹, Futari to itsupiki); Mission 2: Three People and One Machine (三人と一機, San'nin to kazuki); Mission 3: Teriha Vanishes (照葉消失, Shōyō shōshitsu); Mission 4: I'm Home (ただいま, Tadaima); Mission 5: 8000001 (8000001); Mission 6: The Waste Land (氷の世界, Kōri no sekai)
21	October 29, 2008	978-4-7859-3049-3	April 13, 2010	978-1-4215-3161-8
Mission 1: 30,000 Miles Underground (地底3万マイル, Chitei 3 man mairu); Mission 2: Homecoming (再返還, Sai henkan); Mission 3: The Gap (格差, Kakusa); Mission 4: I Am the Machine and the Machine is Me (俺がマシンで機械が俺で, Ore ga mashin de kikai ga ore de); Mission 5: I Am the President and That's the Machine (俺が社長で機械がアレで, Ore ga shachō de kikai ga are de); Mission 6: To be Born Until You are Chosen (選ばれるまで生まれる, Eraba reru made umareru)
22	February 26, 2009	978-4-7859-3120-9	April 12, 2011	978-1-4215-3570-8
Mission 1: Lies, Misunderstandings and Exaggerations (嘘·間違い·大袈裟, Uso machigai ōgesa); Mission 2: The Key and the Keyhole (鍵と鍵穴, Kagi to kagiana); Mission 3: Eating Something You Picked Off the Street (拾い食い, Hiroi-gui); Mission 4: Diary of a Pretty Girl's Brain (ある美女の脳内日記から, Aru bijo no nōnai nikki kara); Mission 5: Physical Labor (肉体労働, Nikutai Rōdō); Mission 6: Bases Loaded (満塁, Manrui)
23	September 30, 2009	978-4-7859-3229-9	April 10, 2012	978-1-4215-3641-5
Mission 1: In the Same Smile He (あの人同じ笑顔で, Ano hito onaji egao de); Mission 2: Incurable Sequelae (不治の後遺症, Fuji no kōishō); Mission 3: See You Soon (お会いしましょう, O ai shimashou); Mission 4: Blank Puzzle (無地のパズル, Muji no pazuru); Mission 5: Actor War (役者戦争, Yakusha sensō); Mission 6: Our Incomplete (不完全たち, Fukanzen-tachi); Mission 7: Someone Invincible (誰か無敵, Dare ka muteki)
24	April 9, 2010	978-4-7859-3358-6	November 13, 2012	978-1-4215-4938-5
Mission 1: Loose and Happy (ゆるくてしあわせ, Yurukute shiawase); Mission 2: The North Wind and Heavy Rain (北風と豪雨, Kitakaze to gōu); Mission 3: Blue Descent (青の降臨, Ao no kōrin); Mission 4: A Wrinkled Angel (皺だらけの天使, Shiwa-darake no tenshi); Mission 5: The Sneering Doctor (嗤う博士, Warau hakase); Mission 6: Shadows of Blue and Scarlet (緋と蒼の影, Hi to aoi no kage)
25	October 7, 2010	978-4-7859-3478-1	April 9, 2013	978-1-4215-4939-2
Mission 1. ●●● Does Not Betray Your Dream (●●は夢を裏切らない, ● ● Wa yume o uragiranai); Mission 2. Fake (紛いもの, Magaimono); Mission 3. Sanctuary (聖域とか, Seiiki toka); Mission 4. Sleep and Awakening (眠りと目覚め, Nemuri to mezame); Mission 5. As a Human Being (ひととして, Hito to shite); Mission 6. Cracked Blue (ひび割れた青, Hibiwareta ao)
26	March 4, 2011	978-4-7859-3578-8	August 13, 2013	978-1-4215-5233-0
Mission 1. Hot and Fading Memories (暑くて薄い記憶, Atsukute usui kioku); Mission 2. Reddish and Bluish Green (緋と蒼の緑, Hi to aoi no midori); Mission 3. First Experience (初体験, Shotaiken); Mission 4. Announcement: Plans to Conquer the City Have Been Cancelled (市街征服 中止のお知らせ, Shigai seifuku chūshi no oshirase); Mission 5. Everyone Has Their Own Courage? (それぞれの勇気?, Sorezore no yūki?); Mission 6. Open the Door (扉を開けて, Tobira o akete)
27	October 29, 2011	978-4-7859-3725-6	January 14, 2014	978-1-4215-5234-7
Mission 1. Blue of Terror (戦慄の蒼, Senritsu no ao); Mission 2. A Fairy Corpse (妖精の残骸, Yōsei no zangai); Mission 3. Miracle of Green (碧の奇跡, Ao no kiseki); Mission 4. The End of a Legend (伝説の終了, Densetsu no shūryō); Final Mission. Excel Saga (EXCEL SAGA)
