= Battle club =

Battle Club may refer to:

- Club (weapon)
- Battle Club (manga), a manga series from the creators of Ikki Tousen
