= Comical Psychosomatic Medicine =

Japanese manga series

- Cover of the first manga volume

マンガで分かる心療内科 (Manga de Wakaru Shinryōnaika)
- Genre: Gag comedy
- Manga
- Written by: Yū Yūki
- Illustrated by: Sō
- Published by: Shōnen Gahōsha
- Magazine: Young King
- Original run: May 12, 2010 – present
- Volumes: 15
- Audio drama
- Released: November 15, 2012
- Original net animation
- Directed by: Hirofumi Ogura
- Music by: Takatsugu Wakabayashi
- Studio: For All
- Released: February 13, 2015 – June 26, 2015
- Runtime: 5 minutes per episode
- Episodes: 20

Comical Psychosomatic Medicine (Japanese: マンガで分かる心療内科, Hepburn: Manga de Wakaru Shinryōnaika; meaning "animation explaining psychosomatic medicine") is a Japanese gag comedy manga series written by Yū Yūki and illustrated by Sō and serialized on Shōnen Gahōsha's Young King magazine. It was adapted into an original net animation which premiered in February 2015.

== Characters ==
Ryō Shinnai (心内 療, Shinnai Ryō)
Voiced by: Wataru Hatano (drama CD), Shinichiro Miki (anime)
The Ryō family patriarch, who frequently works with Asuna and has a doctor-like personality.
Asuna Kangoshi (官越 あすな, Kangoshi Asuna)
Voiced by: Ai Kayano (drama CD), Yurika Endō (anime)
The youngest daughter of the Kangoshi family, who is revealed to work after school. She has a dark purple hair with a one tight hairstyle, she loves the color blue and always cuts her father's advice. The name "Kangoshi" means nurse.
Iyashi Kangoshi (官越 いやし, Kangoshi Iyashi)
Voiced by: Miho Arakawa (drama CD), Yōko Hikasa (anime)
The eldest daughter of Kangoshi family. With dark-brown hair, she is quite mature and has a rather feminine personality.
Himeru Kangoshi (官越 ひめる, Kangoshi Himeru)
The middle daughter of the Kangoshi family, she has a short, dark-brown hair. She is very shy and introverted in nature, and often fights her shyness through cosplay.
Sukizō Kangoshi (官越 好蔵, Kangoshi Sukizō)
Voiced by: Kenichi Ogata (anime)
The Kanogashi family grandfather, he is at least 50 years older than Asuna, and somewhat of a pervert.
Sakura Ryō (療 佐倉, Ryō Sakura)
Voiced by: Saori Hayami (anime)
Shinnai's mother, she has a long dark purple and wears a cherry blossom hair clip at the right side of her hair. She is passionate, like Asuna. She is the designer of the clinic's white nurse uniform and the doctor's coat for Ryō.

== Media ==
=== Manga ===
Comical Psychosomatic Medicine first began as a web manga written by psychiatrist Yū Yūki and illustrated by Sō. The web manga is irregularly serialized in Yū Mental Clinic's website which started in 2009. The manga is also serialized on Shōnen Gahōsha's Young King magazine in May 2010.

=== Anime ===
An anime adaptation is produced by Shin-Ei Animation (under the name For All) and directed by Hirofumi Ogura. The original net animation series Comical Psychosomatic Medicine (アニメで分かる心療内科, Anime de Wakaru Shinryōnaika) started to stream in Japan on February 13, 2015, with about five minutes per episode. The ending theme is Karappo Capsule (からっぽカプセル, Empty Capsule) by Maaya Uchida.

==== Episodes ====
No.	Title	Original release date
1	"How do you remedy an ED?"; Transliteration: "ED o Kaizen suru Hōhō Wa?" (Japanese: EDを改善する方法は？)	February 13, 2015
2	"In What Point is Lolicon a Disease?"; Transliteration: "Rorikon wa Doko kara Byōki na no?" (Japanese: ロリコンはどこから病気なの？)	February 20, 2015
3	"Cognitive Impairment...Is Your Intelligence Alright?"; Transliteration: "Ninshishō… Anata no Chinō wa Daijōbu?" (Japanese: 認知症…あなたの知能は大丈夫？)	February 27, 2015
4	"How Do You Remedy a Sleep Disorder?"; Transliteration: "Suimin Shōgai o Kaizen suru ni wa?" (Japanese: 睡眠障害を改善するには？)	March 6, 2015
5	"Your Favorite Color Tells all about your Mental State!"; Transliteration: "Suki na Iro de Mentaru no Subete ga Wakaru!" (Japanese: 好きな色でメンタルの全てが分かる！)	March 13, 2015
6	"What is a Panic Disorder?"; Transliteration: "Panikku Shōgai-tte Nan Desu ka?" (Japanese: パニック障害って何ですか？)	March 20, 2015
7	"What Kind of Illness is "Depression"?"; Transliteration: "“Utsu”tte don'na Byōki na no?" (Japanese: 『うつ』ってどんな病気なの？)	March 27, 2015
8	"The Decisive Treatment for ED is?" Transliteration: "ED no Ketteiteki na Chiryōhō wa?" (Japanese: EDの決定的な治療法は？)	April 3, 2015
9	"The Treatment for Fetishism is?" Transliteration: "Fetishizumu no Chiryōhō wa?" (Japanese: フェティシズムの治療法は？)	April 10, 2015
10	"The Treatment for Exhibitionism is?" Transliteration: "Roshutsushō no Chiryōhō wa?" (Japanese: 露出症の治療法は？)	April 17, 2015
11	"In What Point is "Peeping" a Disease?"; Transliteration: "“Nozoki” wa Doko Kara Byōki na no?" (Japanese: 『のぞき』はどこから病気なの？)	April 24, 2015
12	"What is a Social Anxiety Disorder?"; Transliteration: "Shakai Fuan Shōgai-tte Nan Desu ka?" (Japanese: 社会不安障害ってなんですか？)	May 1, 2015
13	"Be Careful of Sleep Hapnea Syndrome!"; Transliteration: "Suiminji Mukokyuushou Kougun ni Ki o Tsukete!" (Japanese: 睡眠時無呼吸症候群に気を付けて！)	May 8, 2015
14	"Accept Grief in 4 Stages ?!"; Transliteration: "Zetsubō wa 4 Dankai de Ukeireru!?" (Japanese: 絶望は４段階で受け入れる！？)	May 15, 2015
15	"What is a Seasonal Affective Disorder?"; Transliteration: "Kisetsusei Kanjō Shōgai-tte Nan Desu ka?" (Japanese: 季節性感情障害ってなんですか？)	May 22, 2015
16	"What is the Mentality of Stalkers?"; Transliteration: "Sutōkā no Shinri to wa?" (Japanese: ストーカーの心理とは？)	May 29, 2015
17	"Think Proactively about Painful Things ?!"; Transliteration: "Tsurai Koto o Sekkyokutekini Kangaero! ?" (Japanese: つらいことを積極的に考えろ!?)	June 5, 2015
18	"Subconscious Patterns of People likely to Suffer from Mental Disorders"; Transliteration: "Kokoro no Byōki ni Nari Yasui Hito no Muishiki no Patān" (Japanese: 心の病気になりやすい人の無意識のパターン)	June 12, 2015
19	"What Day is the Toughest on your Mental State?"; Transliteration: "Kokoro ga Tsurai no wa Naniyōbi?" (Japanese: 心がつらいのは何曜日？)	June 19, 2015
20	"What kind of Place is a Mental Clinic?"; Transliteration: "Mentaru Kurinikkutte dō iū Tokoro?" (Japanese: メンタルクリニックってどういうところ？)	June 26, 2015

=== Other media ===
A drama CD was released along with the seventh volume of the manga.

== Reception ==
=== Manga ===
==== Sales ====
Oricon Japanese manga chart
Volume No.	Peak rank	Copies Sold	Ref
2	29	38,928 (as of November 28, 2010)	
3	8	40,616 (as of May 15, 2011)	
4	24	31,168 (as of October 2, 2011)	
5	21	35,563 (as of January 1, 2012)	
6	30	34,429 (as of July 1, 2012)	
7	29	33,444 (as of October 28, 2012)	
8	35	28,605 (as of March 30, 2013)	
9	26	23,477 (as of November 17, 2013)	
10	44	21,250 (as of March 1, 2014)	
11	41	18,496 (as of June 15, 2014)	

== External-links ==
- Anime official website (in Japanese)
- Comical Psychosomatic Medicine (manga) at Anime News Network's encyclopedia
