= Yume no Kayoiji =

Japanese manga

ゆめのかよいじ
- Manga
- Written by: Yasuyuki Ōno
- Published by: Shōnen Gahōsha
- Magazine: Young King
- Original run: 1987 – 1988
- Volumes: 1
- Live-action film
- Directed by: Toshihiro Gotō
- Written by: Toshihiro Gotō
- Released: November 17, 2012

Yume no Kayoiji (ゆめのかよいじ; "Path of Dreams") is a Japanese manga written and illustrated by Yasuyuki Ōno. A live action film based on the manga was released in 2012.

== Cast ==
- Anna Ishibashi
- Shunya Shiraishi
- Kaya Asano
- Yui Ueta
- Satsuki Okada
- Yoshinobu Yamada
- Michie Kita
- Miyoko Ōmomo
