= Anjo the Mischievous Gal =

Japanese manga series

- Cover of the first tankōbon volume, featuring Anna Anjo

やんちゃギャルの安城さん (Yancha Gyaru no Anjō-san)
- Genre: Romantic comedy
- Manga
- Written by: Yūichi Katō
- Published by: Shōnen Gahōsha
- English publisher: NA: Orange Inc.
- Imprint: Young King Comics
- Magazine: Young King
- Original run: August 12, 2017 – present
- Volumes: 17
- Manga

Ms. Komaki: The School Nurse At Anjo's School
- Written by: Yūichi Katō
- Illustrated by: Tsubaki Ayasugi
- Published by: Shōnen Gahōsha
- Imprint: Young King Comics
- Magazine: Young King
- Original run: May 13, 2019 – June 28, 2021
- Volumes: 3
- Manga

Anjo the Mischievous Gal and Friends: First Year Edition
- Written by: Yūichi Katō
- Illustrated by: Suoshiro
- Published by: Shōnen Gahōsha
- Imprint: Young King Comics
- Magazine: Young King
- Original run: May 27, 2019 – September 26, 2022
- Volumes: 6
- Manga

Komaki-sensei no Dungeon Hoken Dayori feat. Yancha Gal no Anjō-san
- Written by: Yūichi Katō
- Illustrated by: Suoshiro
- Published by: Shōnen Gahōsha
- Imprint: Young King Comics
- Magazine: Young King
- Original run: December 12, 2022 – July 22, 2024
- Volumes: 2
- icon

Anjo the Mischievous Gal (Japanese: やんちゃギャルの安城さん, Hepburn: Yancha Gyaru no Anjō-san) is a Japanese manga series written and illustrated by Yūichi Katō. It has been serialized since August 2017 in Shōnen Gahōsha's Young King magazine and its chapters have been collected into seventeen tankōbon volumes.

In May 2019, Katō started two Anjo manga spinoffs: Ms. Komaki: The School Nurse At Anjo's School (安城さんの学校の保健室の小牧先生, Anjō-san no Gakkō no Hokenshitsu no Komaki-sensei), illustrated by Tsubaki Ayasugi, and Anjo the Mischievous Gal and Friends: First Year Edition (やんちゃギャルの安城さんたち 高1編, Yancha Gyaru no Anjō-san-tachi: Kō-ichi-hen), illustrated by Suoshiro, which both shared serialization in Young King along with the main series.

In December 2022, Katō and Suoshiro would team up again to start a third Anjo manga spinoff: Komaki-sensei no Dungeon Hoken Dayori feat. Yancha Gal no Anjō-san (小牧先生のダンジョンほけんだより ~feat.やんちゃギャルの安城さん~, Komaki-sensei no Danjon Hoken Dayori ~fīto. Yancha Gyaru no Anjō-san~; "Ms. Komaki's Dungeon Health Report feat. Anjo the Mischievous Gal").

== Plot ==
In a high school in Kasugai, Seto is a serious student who lives a quiet and ordinary life. But when his mischievous classmate, Anna Anjo, begins teasing and hanging out with him on a regular basis, it starts an interesting relationship between them. The story follows the lives and antics of the two polar opposites, both in appearance and personality, as they develop into a romantic couple through their many playful—and sometimes erotic—interactions.

Anjo is accompanied by her female friends, Toyoda and Chita, while Seto is accompanied by his male friends, Inuyama and Tokio. As they all grow friendly with one another, each person becomes romantically linked to their respective partner within the group as the story progresses.

== Characters ==
Most of the names of the characters are based on cities located in Aichi Prefecture.

Seto (瀬戸)
Voiced by: Makoto Asakawa (voice comic)
Seto is a bespectacled high school student in his second year, who is the president of his class. He is a plain and ordinary-looking boy who initially has no interest in girls and only cares about his grades. He struggles trying to improve the person that he is and is unsure about his future ambitions in life.^{Ch. 98} In their initial encounters, he sees Anjo as too erotic, he gets very lewd thoughts around her, and does not know anything about her or understand why she teases him.^{Ch. 1-10} After he defended her from harsh words by a classmate, and as the two started to hang out more, he has developed serious feelings for her.^{Ch. 113-114} He is named after the city of Seto, Aichi.
Anna Anjo (安城 アンナ, Anjō An'na)
Voiced by: Chiharu Seto (voice comic)
Anjo is a gyaru who is in the same class as Seto.^{Ch. 1} She is incredibly beautiful, flamboyant, athletic, and popular with a cheery personality and outgoing kindness. When the two first met, she took a liking to Seto because of his helpfulness and hard-working nature, then developed a deep crush for him after one of the boys in their class spoke nasty things about her behind her back that Seto refuted.^{Ch. 14} Ever since, she teases and flirts with him constantly, sometimes to lewd extents. She hopes to follow in her mother's footsteps and become a professional beautician, and will sometimes use Seto as styling practice.^{Ch. 6} However, she struggles at achieving her goal due to her poor academic abilities.^{Ch. 179} She is named after the city of Anjō, Aichi.
Toyoda (豊田)
Voiced by: Yukako Nihei (voice comic)
Toyoda is one of Anjo's friends. Nicknamed "Toyo" (トヨ), she is a "cool beauty" who speaks in a Kansai dialect and sports long jet-black hair. She likes cute gacha-style toys,^{Ch. 27} although she is embarrassed by this as she feels having an affinity for such things does not fit her outward appearance and personality.^{Ch. 57} Her dream is to become the president of a company that creates fancy mascot characters.^{Ch. 47} She takes drawing lessons alongside Inuyama.^{Ch. 122-124} Although she has affection for Inuyama, she is not ready to advance her relationship to the level that Seto and Anjo have.^{Ch. 162} She is named after the city of Toyota, Aichi.
Inuyama (犬山)
Inuyama is Seto's best friend since junior high.^{Ch. 98} He is an otaku who is exceptionally good at drawing and designing cosplay costumes. At first, he takes interest in Toyoda simply because she has a large chest,^{Ch. 7} but after learning that they share an interest in cute toys when the two met at a gacha machine, and as they both worked together in a mascot character contest,^{Ch. 57-59, 63} he starts developing deeper feelings for her. Later in the story, he has the desire to ask Toyoda out, but is scared from possible rejection and the sadness that would follow.^{Ch. 90} He is named after the city of Inuyama, Aichi.
Chita (知多)
Voiced by: Yūri Akeshima (voice comic)
Chita is another friend of Anjo's. Nicknamed "Chi" (チー, Chī), she is a mostly quiet girl with very short hair, thick eyebrows, and a petite figure. She is a foodie with a big appetite who can be seen eating large amounts of food. She dreams of traveling overseas after graduation.^{Ch. 122} Early on in the story, she appears jealous of Seto spending most of his time hanging out with Anjo, despite knowing nothing about her, as she hopes the least Seto can do is keep Anjo happy, or else she will not forgive him.^{Ch. 51} She is named after the city of Chita, Aichi.
Tokio (トキオ)
Tokio is Toyoda's brother.^{Ch. 71} He attends Anjo and Seto's high school and is very popular with the girls there because of his attractiveness. He becomes a big eater like Chita by going out with her on several food stops throughout the story.^{Ch. 75, 120-121} The two have known each other since childhood and appear to have feelings for one another.^{Ch. 120-122} He is upset at the idea that Chita sees and treats him as a big brother while he has never seen her as a sibling-type and always as just a girl.^{Ch. 125, 135} He is good friends with Seto and Inuyama, as they all help each other with their school studies.^{Ch. 98}
Ms. Komaki (小牧先生, Komaki-sensei)
Komaki is the nurse at the high school. She is a free-spirited young woman with a warm personality who deeply cares about the students she looks after. She often offers life advice to the students around the school, and many of them see Komaki as a "big sister" of sorts. She has a bond with Seto through the two exchanging similar tastes in manga.^{Ch. 4, 62} In the main series, as well as her first spinoff series, she can be seen with her best friend and colleague, Tobishima (飛島), (Note: Named after the village of Tobishima, Aichi.) who is an art teacher. In her second spinoff series, she is summoned to an isekai world inhabited by demons. She is named after the city of Komaki, Aichi.

== Media ==
=== Manga ===
Anjo the Mischievous Gal is written and illustrated by Yūichi Katō. The series has its origins on Pixiv, where Katō published short stories featuring Anjō and Seto, as early as March 2017. A manga then began serialization in issue #17 of Shōnen Gahōsha's Young King magazine on August 12, 2017. Shōnen Gahōsha has collected its chapters into individual tankōbon volumes. As of April 27, 2026, seventeen volumes have been published. Outside of Japan, the manga is published in South Korea by AK Comics, in Spain by Kitsune Manga, and in Germany by Yomeru. Orange Inc. acquired Anjo the Mischievous Gal for digital English publication in North America on September 3, 2024.

A spinoff manga, Ms. Komaki: The School Nurse At Anjo's School, written by Katō and illustrated by Tsubaki Ayasugi, was serialized in Young King starting from issue #11 on May 13, 2019, ending in issue #14 on June 28, 2021, and has three tankōbon volumes published from July 13, 2020, to July 12, 2021.

In the following issue, another spinoff, Anjo the Mischievous Gal and Friends: First Year Edition, also written by Katō and illustrated by Suoshiro, was serialized in Young King starting from issue #12 on May 27, 2019, ending in issue #20 on September 27, 2021, and has six tankōbon volumes published from December 23, 2019, to December 12, 2022.

In 2022, Katō and Suoshiro started a third, isekai-themed spinoff, Komaki-sensei no Dungeon Hoken Dayori feat. Yancha Gal no Anjō-san. It was serialized in Young King starting from issue #1 on December 12, 2022, ending in issue #16 on July 22, 2024, and has two tankōbon volumes published from August 7, 2023, to August 26, 2024.

==== Volumes ====
===== Anjo the Mischievous Gal =====
No.	Original release date	Original ISBN	English release date	English ISBN
1	March 12, 2018	978-4-7859-6176-3	September 3, 2024	979-8-8949-5005-1
1. "Everything Anjo Does is Sexy" (安城さんがいちいちエロい, Anjō-san ga Ichīchi Eroi); 2. "Anjo Won't Leave Me Alone" (安城さんはほっとけない, Anjō-san wa Hottokenai); 3. "Lunch with Anjo" (安城さんの昼休み, Anjō-san no Hiruyasumi); 4. "Anjo and the Manga Cafe" (安城さんとマンキツ, Anjō-san to Mankitsu); 5. "Shopping with Anjo" (安城さんのお買い物, Anjō-san no Okaimono); 6. "Anjo Is Busy" (安城さんは忙しい, Anjō-san wa Isogashī); 7. "Anjo's Chest" (安城さんの胸のうち, Anjō-san no Mune no Uchi); Bonus 1: "Eye Test" (視力検査, Shiryoku Kensa); Bonus 2: "Thunder" (かみなり, Kaminari); Bonus 3: "Kitty" (にゃんこ, Nyanko); 8. "Anjo Won't Overlook It" (安城さんは見過ごせない, Anjō-san wa Misugosenai); 9. "Anjo Wants to Cheer Seto Up" (安城さんはなぐさめたい, Anjō-san wa Nagusametai); 10. "Anjo and the First Aid Course" (安城さんの安全講習, Anjō-san no Anzen Kōshū); 11. "Anjo's Present" (安城さんのごほーび, Anjō-san no Gohōbi); 12. "Anjo Doesn't Want to Study" (安城さんは勉強したくない, Anjō-san wa Benkyōshitakunai); 13. "Anjo Wants to Nurse Him" (安城さんは看病したい, Anjō-san wa Kanbyōshitai); 14. "Anjo and Seto" (安城さんと瀬戸くん, Anjō-san to Seto-kun); Bonus 4: "Partner-In-Crime" (共犯, Kyōhan); Bonus 5: "Accident" (事故, Jiko); Bonus 6: "Makeup" (メイク, Meiku)
2	August 27, 2018	978-4-7859-6268-5	September 3, 2024	979-8-8949-5006-8
15. "Anjo Wants to Do Something Naughty" (安城さんはイケナイコトしたい, Anjō-san wa Ikenaikotoshitai); 16. "Anjo Wants to Stay Up Late" (安城さんは夜遊びしたい, Anjō-san wa Yoasobishitai); 17. "Anjo Wants to Help" (安城さんは手伝いたい, Anjō-san wa Tetsudaitai); 18. "Anjo Wants to Have a Sleepover" (安城さんはお泊まりさせたい, Anjō-san wa Otomarisasetai); 19. "Anjo Wants to Play in the Water" (安城さんは水浴びしたい, Anjō-san wa Mizuabishitai); 20. "Training with Anjo" (安城さんのトレーニング, Anjō-san no Torēningu); 21. "Anjo's Fashion Tips" (安城さんのコーディネート, Anjō-san no Kōdinēto); Bonus 1: "Game" (ゲーム, Gēmu); Bonus 2: "Mosquito" (蚊, Ka); Bonus 3: "Hobbies" (趣味, Shumi); 22. "Anjo's Prey" (安城さんのエモノ, Anjō-san no Emono); 23. "Summer Break" (安城さんとみんなの夏休み, Anjō-san to Min'nano Natsuyasumi); 24. "Anjo Wants to Have a Summer Festival Date" (安城さんは夏祭りデートしたい, Anjō-san wa Natsu Matsuri Dētoshitai); 25. "Anjo Can't Find Her Cat" (安城さんの猫探し, Anjō-san no Neko Sagashi); 26. "Anjo and Masamune" (安城さんとマサムネ, Anjō-san to Masamune); 27. "Toyoda the Cool Beauty" (クールビューティーな豊田さん, Kūru Byūtī na Toyoda-san); 28. "Anjo and Seto's Written Apology" (安城さんと瀬戸君の反省文, Anjō-san to Seto-kun no Hansei Bun); Bonus 4: "More Than Friends" (性的対象, Seiteki Taishō); Bonus 5: "Meeting" (待ち合わせ, Machiawase)
3	February 12, 2019	978-4-7859-6375-0	September 3, 2024	979-8-8949-5007-5
29. "Anjo Likes Frappes" (安城さんはフラッペが好き, Anjō-san wa Furappe ga Suki); 30. "Toyoda and Cream Soda" (豊田さんとクリームソーダ, Toyoda-san to Kurīmu Sōda); 31. "Anjo Hates Scary Things?!" (安城さんは怖いものが嫌い!?, Anjō-san wa Kowai Mono ga Kirai!?); 32. "Anjo is on the School Festival Committee Too" (安城さんも文化祭準備係, Anjō-san mo Bunkamatsuri Junbi-gakari); 33. "Anjo's Karaoke Crash Course" (安城さんとカラオケ特訓, Anjō-san to Karaoke Tokkun); 34. "Anjo's Leg Hurts" (安城さんは足が痛い, Anjō-san wa Ashigaitai); 35. "Anjo's Spooky Make-Up Class" (安城さんの傷メイク講座, Anjō-san no Kizu Meiku Kōza); Bonus 1: "Curse You" (うらめしや, Urameshi Ya); Bonus 2: "The Key" (カギ探し, Kagi Sagashi); 36. "The Night Before The School Festival" (安城さんと文化祭前夜, Anjō-san to Bunkamatsuri Zen'ya); 37. "Toyoda and Inuyama's School Festival" (豊田さんと犬山君の文化祭, Toyoda-san to Inuyama-kun no Bunkamatsuri); 38. "Anjo and the School Festival" (安城さんと文化祭, Anjō-san to Bunkamatsuri); 39. "Anjo and the Best Couple Contest" (安城さんとベストカップルコンテスト, Anjō-san to Besuto Kappuru Kontesuto); 40. "Anjo Not in the Mood" (ちょっぴり不機嫌な安城さん, Choppiri Fukigen na Anjō-san); 41. "Anjo Wants to Line Up with Seto" (安城さんは瀬戸くんと並びたい, Anjō-san wa Seto-kun to Narabitai); 42. "Seto Sits Next to Anjo" (瀬戸くんは安城さんと並んで座る, Seto-kun wa Anjō-san to Narande Suwaru); Bonus 3: "Perfume" (練り香水, Neri Kōsui); Bonus 4: "Fortune Telling" (運勢占い, Unsei Uranai)
4	August 8, 2019	978-4-7859-6477-1	September 3, 2024	979-8-8949-5017-4
43. "Anjo Wants to Eat Ramen" (安城さんはラーメン食べたい, Anjō-san wa Rāmen Tabetai); 44. "Anjo Wants to Go to the Arcade" (安城さんはゲーセンで遊びたい, Anjō-san wa Gēsen de Asobitai); 45. "Anjo Wants to Make Something Yummy" (安城さんは美味しいものを食べさせたい, Anjō-san wa Oishī Mono o Tabesasetai); 46. "Anjo Is Lonely" (寂しがり屋の安城さん, Samishigariya no Anjō-san); 47. "Toyoda Is Bad at Science" (豊田さんは理系が苦手, Toyoda-san wa Rikei ga Nigate); 48. "The Seto That Anjo Doesn't Know" (安城さんの知らない瀬戸くん, Anjō-san no Shiranai Seto-kun); Bonus 1: "Station Bench" (駅ベンチ, Eki Benchi); Bonus 2: "The Special Banana" (特別なバナナ, Tokubetsu na Banana); 49. "Anjo Wants to Go Bowling" (安城さんはボウリングしたい, Anjō-san wa Bōringushitai); 50. "Anjo Likes Massages" (安城さんはマッサージが好き, Anjō-san wa Massāji ga Suki); 51. "Chita Is Hard to Understand" (知多さんはよくわからない, Chita-san wa Yoku Wakaranai); 52. "Anjo Hasn't Been Sleeping Well" (安城さんは最近寝不足, Anjō-san wa Saikin Nebusoku); 53. "Anjo Wants to Take Over the World" (安城さんは世界制覇したい, Anjō-san wa Sekai Seihashitai); 54. "Every Day with Anjo Is Like Magic" (安城さんとのキラキラな毎日, Anjō-san to no Kirakirana Mainichi); Bonus 3: "It Wasn't a Dream" (夢じゃなかった, Yume Janakatta)
5	December 23, 2019	978-4-7859-6581-5	October 4, 2024 (Note: Based on the source code of the website.)	979-8-8949-5033-4
55. "Anjo Wants to Play Catch" (安城さんはキャッチボールしたい, Anjō-san wa Kyatchibōrushitai); 56. "Anjo Isn't Cold" (安城さんは寒くない, Anjō-san wa Samukunai); 57. "Toyoda Wants to Enter the Contest (豊田さんはコンペにエントリーしたい, Toyoda-san wa Konpe ni Entorīshitai); 58. "Toyoda Can't Enter the Contest" (豊田さんはコンペにエントリー出来ない, Toyoda-san wa Konpe ni Entorī Dekinai); 59. "Toyoda Is Embarrassed" (豊田さんは恥ずかしがり屋, Toyoda-san wa Hazukashigariya); 60. "Anjo Loves Christmas" (安城さんはクリスマスが好き, Anjō-san wa Kurisumasu ga Suki); Bonus 1: "Oden with Miso" (味噌おでん); 61. "Anjo Is Bad with Polite Language" (安城さんは敬語が苦手, Anjō-san wa Keigo ga Nigate); 62. "Ms. Komaki and Seto" (小牧先生と瀬戸くん, Komaki sensei to Seto-kun); 63. "Do Your Best at the Contest, Toyoda" (ゆるキャラコンペ頑張れ豊田さん, Yurukyara Konpe Ganbare Toyoda-san); 64. "Everyone's Christmas" (それぞれのクリスマス, Sorezore no Kurisumasu); 65. "Anjo Wants to Enjoy Christmas" (安城さんはクリスマスを楽しみたい, Anjō-san wa Kurisumasu o Tanoshimitai); 66. "A Small Christmas Miracle" (クリスマスにちょこっとくらい奇跡は起こる, Kurisumasu ni Chokotto Kurai Kiseki wa Okoru); Bonus 2: "Contest Preparation" (コンペ準備, Konpe Junbi)
6	July 13, 2020	978-4-7859-6707-9	November 15, 2024	979-8-8949-5066-2
67. "Anjo's Apology Plan" (安城さんの謝罪作戦, Anjō-san no Shazai Sakusen); 68. "Cleaning with Anjo" (安城さんと大掃除, Anjō-san to Daisōji); 69. "Anjo's End of Year Message" (安城さんの今年最後のメッセージ, Anjō-san no Kotoshi Saigo no Messēji); 70. "Anjo's First Day" (安城さんの最初の一日, Anjō-san no Saisho no Tsuitachi); 71. "Hatsumode with Anjo" (安城さんと初詣, Anjō-san to Hatsumōde); 72. "Anjo and Seto's Wishes" (安城さんと瀬戸くんの願い事, Anjō-san to Seto-kun no Negaigoto); Bonus: "Ms. Komaki's Last Days of the Year" (小牧先生たちの年末, Komaki-sensei-tachi no Nenmatsu); 73. "Boy's Meeting (Top Secret)" (男たちの会議（機密事項）, Otoko-tachi no Kaigi (Kimitsu Jikō)); 74. "Anjo Wants to Play a Word Game" (安城さんはグリコしたい, Anjō-san wa Gurikoshitai); 75. "Chita Wants to Eat a Lot" (知多さんはたくさん食べたい, Chita-san wa Takusan Tabetai); 76. "Anjo and the Golden Azazel" (安城さんと金のアザゼル, Anjō-san to Kin no Azazeru); 77. "Anjo's Free Drink" (安城さんのジュース入手方法, Anjō-san no Jūsu Nyūshu Hōhō); 78. "My Feelings for You" (僕はいつものキミが, Boku wa Itsumo no Kimi ga)
7	December 14, 2020	978-4-7859-6816-8	December 27, 2024	979-8-8949-5124-9
79. "Anjo Is Sleepy" (寝不足な安城さん, Nebusoku na Anjō-san); 80. "The Way Things Are" (安城さんとずっとこのまま, Anjō-san to Zutto Kono Mama); 81. "Anjo and the Last Kernel" (安城さんと最後の一粒, Anjō-san to Saigo no Hitotsubu); 82. "Anjo Likes Omelet Rice" (安城さんはオムライスが好き, Anjō-san wa Omuraisu ga Suki); 83. "Anjo and the Snowball Fight" (安城さんと雪合戦, Anjō-san to Yukigassen); 84. "Toyoda Can't Decide on Donuts" (豊田さんはドーナツを選べない, Toyoda-san wa Dōnatsu o Erabenai); 85. "Seto Wants to Change" (瀬戸くんは変わりたい, Seto-kun wa Kawaritai); 86. "Waking Up with Anjo" (安城さんと朝チュン, Anjō-san to Asa Chun); 87. "Anjo and the School Trip" (安城さんと修学旅行, Anjō-san to Shūgakuryokō); 88. "Anjo and the Pajama Party" (安城さんとパジャマ祭り, Anjō-san to Pajama Matsuri); 89. "Toyoda Is Pumped" (テンション爆上げ豊田さん, Tenshon Bakuage Toyoda-san); 90. "That 1% Chance" (僕らは1%を踏み出せない, Bokura wa Ichi-pāsento o Fumidasenai)
8	July 12, 2021	978-4-7859-6944-8	February 21, 2025	979-8-8949-5126-3
91. "Anjo Likes Red Bean Toast" (安城さんは小倉トーストが好き, Anjō-san wa Ogura Tōsuto ga Suki); 92. "Welcome Home, Anjo?" (安城さんお帰りなさい?, Anjō-san Okaerinasai?); 93. "Anjo Wants to Stay Close" (安城さんは離れがたい, Anjō-san wa Hanaregatai); 94. "Anjo and Parental Permission" (安城さんと親コーニン, Anjō-san to Oya Kōnin); 95. "Anjo Wants to Be Together" (安城さんは一緒が良い, Anjō-san wa Issho ga Yoi); 96. "Seto's Prophetic Dream" (瀬戸くんの正夢, Seto-kun no Masayume); 97. "Anjo and Seto Wake Up Together" (安城さんと瀬戸くんは二人で目を覚ます, Anjō-san to Seto-kun wa Futari de Mewosamasu); 98. "Girl's Meeting (Comfy)" (女たちの集い（ゆるゆる）, On'na-tachi no Tsudoi (Yuruyuru)); 99. "Chocolate Boot Camp" (チョコレートの陣, Chokorēto no Jin); 100. "Valentine's Day" (みんなのバレンタインデー, Min'na no Barentaindē); 101. "Seto Wants to Give Her Chocolate" (瀬戸くんはチョコレートを渡したい, Seto-kun wa Chokorēto o Watashitai); 102. "Seto Doesn't Understand Jokes" (瀬戸くんは冗談がわからない, Seto-kun wa Jōdan ga Wakaranai)
9	December 13, 2021	978-4-7859-7050-5	May 28, 2025	979-8-8949-5127-0
103. "Anjo Wants to Hang Out During Test Week" (安城さんはテスト週間も遊びたい, Anjō-san wa Tesuto Shūkan mo Asobitai); 104. "Anjo Wants to Charge" (安城さんは補充したい, Anjō-san wa Hojūshitai); 105. "The Day Before Tokio's Exams" (トキオくんの受験前日, Tokio-kun no Juken Zenjitsu); 106. "Inuyama Wants to Help His Friends" (犬山くんは友達を助けたい, Inuyama-kun wa Tomodachi o Tasuketai); 107. "The Toyoda Siblings Are Complicated" (豊田姉妹コンプリケイテッド, Toyoda Shimai Konpurikeiteddo); 108. "Seto Likes Studying" (瀬戸くんは勉強が好き, Seto-kun wa Benkyō ga Suki); 109. "Anjo Doesn't Get Hay Fever" (安城さんは花粉症にならない, Anjō-san wa Kabunshō ni Naranai); 110. "Anjo Likes Being Older" (安城さんはおねーさんぶりたい, Anjō-san wa Ōne-san Buritai); 111. "Inuyama Doesn't Want to Be Hated" (犬山くんは嫌われたくない, Inuyama-kun wa Kirawaretakunai); 112. "Toyoda Isn't Mad" (豊田さんは怒ってない, Toyoda-san wa Okottenai); 113. "Anjo's Surprise" (安城さんはサプライズしたい, Anjō-san wa Sapuraizushitai); 114. "Anjo Wants to Eat Cherry Blossoms" (安城さんは桜を食べたい, Anjō-san wa Sakura o Tabetai); 115. "Seto Likes Anjo" (瀬戸くんは安城さんが好き, Seto-kun wa Anjō-san ga Suki)
10	May 23, 2022	978-4-7859-7140-3	November 7, 2025	979-8-8949-5194-2
116. "Anjo Likes Seto" (安城さんは瀬戸くんが好き, Anjō-san wa Seto-kun ga Suki); 117. "Seto's First Day with Anjo the Mischievous Gal" (やんちゃギャルの安城さんと瀬戸くんの一日目, Yancha Gyaru no Anjō-san to Seto-kun no Ichinichime); 118. "Anjo Doesn't Want Him to See" (安城さんは見られたくない, Anjō-san wa Miraretakunai); 119. "Inuyama Can't Believe It" (犬山くんは信じない, Inuyama-kun wa Shinjinai); 120. "Ms. Komaki's Best Day Off Ever" (小牧先生の最高の休日, Komaki-sensei no Saikō no Kyūjitsu); 121. "Anjo Likes Giraffes" (安城さんはキリンが好き, Anjō-san wa Kirin ga Suki); 122. "Anjo Wants to Stick Close" (安城さんはくっつきたい, Anjō-san wa Kuttsukitai); 123. "Chita Wants to Eat Ramen" (知多さんはラーメン食べたい, Chita-san wa Rāmen Tabetai); 124. "Chita Wants to Eat Udon" (知多さんはうどん食べたい, Chita-san wa Udon Tabetai); 125. "Chita's Unchanging Daily Life and Toyoda's Changing Daily Life" (知多さんの変わらない日常と豊田さんの変わる日常, Chita-san no Kawaranai Nichijō to Toyoda-san no Kawaru Nichijō); 126. "Toyoda Wants to Look Carefully" (豊田さんはよく見たい, Toyoda-san wa Yoku Mitai); 127. "Toyoda Sighs" (豊田さんはため息をつく, Toyoda-san wa Tameiki o Tsuku); 128. "Anjo Likes to Stick Close" (安城さんはくっつくのが好き, Anjō-san wa Kuttsuku no ga Suki)
11	December 12, 2022	978-4-7859-7288-2	April 10, 2026	9798894954516
129. "Anjo's Birthday" (安城さんの誕生日, Anjō-san no Tanjōbi); 130. "Anjo and the Cherry Blossom Earrings" (安城さんと桜のピアス, Anjō-san to Sakura no Piasu); 131. "Seto Wants to Protect Their Precious Time" (瀬戸くんは大切な時間を守りたい, Seto-kun wa Taisetsu na Jikan o Mamoritai); 132. "Toyoda Likes Wafers (Not Really)" (豊田さんはウエハースが好き（嘘）, Toyoda-san wa Uehāsu ga Suki (Uso)); 133. "What Inuyama Wants" (犬山くんの欲しいもの, Inuyama-kun no Hoshīmono); 134. "Anjo Gets Stuck Helping" (安城さんはお手伝いさせられる, Anjō-san wa Otetsudaisaserareru); 135. "Seto Wants to Hold Hands" (瀬戸くんは手を握りたい, Seto-kun wa Te o Nigiritai); 136. "Anjo Wants to Go Home with Seto" (安城さんは瀬戸くんと帰りたい, Anjō-san wa Seto-kun to Kaeritai); 137. "Tokio Wants to Talk" (トキオくんは相談したい, Tokio-kun wa Sōdanshitai); 138. "Chita Wants to Eat Onigiri" (知多さんはおにぎりを食べたい, Chita-san wa Onigiri o Tabetai); 139. "Toyoda Wants to Design a T-shirt" (豊田さんはTシャツデザインしたい, Toyoda-san wa Tīshatsu Dezainshitai); 140. "Seto Can't Forgive This" (瀬戸くんは許せない, Seto-kun wa Yurusenai); 141. "Anjo's Precious Feelings" (安城さんの大事な気持ち, Anjō-san no Daiji na Kimochi)
12	August 7, 2023	978-4-7859-7452-7	—	—
142. Anjō-san wa Mottoshitai (安城さんはもっとしたい); 143. Anjō-san-tachi wa Jukensei (安城さんたちは受験生); 144. Toyoda-san no Shinro Chōsa-hyō (豊田さんの進路調査票); 145. Inuyama-kun wa Kimochi Warui...Kedo (犬山くんは気持ち悪い・・・けど); 146. Toyoda-san to Inuyama-kun to Hajimete no Bijutsukan (豊田さんと犬山くんと初めての美術館); 147. Seto-kun wa Romantikku ga Tomaranai (瀬戸くんはロマンティックが止まらない); 148. Anjō-san wa Warukunai (安城さんは悪くない); 149. Anjō-san wa Zenbushitai (安城さんは全部したい); 150. Okazaki-san to Tani-san no Amai Mainichi (岡崎さんと谷さんの甘い毎日); 151. Seto-kun wa Zenbu Ganbaritai (瀬戸くんは全部頑張りたい); 152. Seto-kun wa Kyūgi Taikai de Honki Dasu (瀬戸くんは球技大会で本気出す); 153. Anjō-san wa Uchiageshitai (安城さんは打ち上げしたい); 154. Inuyama-kun no Oorijinaru Konbini Karē (犬山くんのオリジナルコンビニカレー)
13	December 14, 2023	978-4-7859-7558-6	—	—
155. Anjō-san wa Icharabushitai (安城さんはいちゃラブしたい); 156. Anjō-san wa Motto Icharabushitai (安城さんはもっといちゃラブしたい); 157. Sannin wa Tottemo Nakayo (3人はとっても仲良); 158. Anjō-san wa Mama no Kao ga Mirenai (安城さんはママの顔が見れない); 159. Seto-kun wa Fujun Isei Kōyū ga Wakaranai (瀬戸くんは不純異性交遊がわからない); 160. Tokio-kun wa Chita-san no Soba ni Itai (トキオくんは知多さんの側にいたい); 161. Anjō-san wa Ōpun Kyanpasu ni Ikitai (安城さんはオープンキャンパスに行きたい); 162. Seto-kun wa Shōrai ga Fuan (瀬戸くんは将来が不安); 163. Seto-kun wa Nemurenai (瀬戸くんは眠れない); 164. Anjō-san wa Chō Nebusoku (安城さんは超寝不足); 165. Inuyama-kun wa Kokuhaku no Henji o Kikitai (犬山くんは告白の返事を聞きたい); 166. Toyoda-san wa Inuyama-kun to Gachagachashitai (豊田さんは犬山くんとガチャガチャしたい); 167. Anjō-san wa Kirei na Tsuki o Mitai (安城さんは綺麗な月を見たい)
14	July 31, 2024	978-4-7859-7719-1	—	—
168. Anjō-san wa Okurahomamikisā o Odoritai (安城さんはオクラホマミキサーを踊りたい); 169. Seto-kun wa Mada Kodomo (瀬戸くんはまだ子供); 170. Komaki-sensei wa Totonoitakunai (小牧先生はととのいたくない); 171. Seto-kun wa Anjō-san ga Inakute Sabishī (瀬戸くんは安城さんがいなくて寂しい); 172. Toyota-san to Inuyama-kun no Ichi-nichi-me ~ Toyota-san Saido (豊田さんと犬山くんの1日目～豊田さんサイド); 173. Toyota-san to Inuyama-kun no Ichi-nichi-me ~ Inuyama-kun Saido (豊田さんと犬山くんの1日目～犬山くんサイド); 174. Chita-san wa Yōchūbā ni Naritai (知多さんはよーちゅーばーになりたい); 175. Chita-san wa Poteto o Tabetai (知多さんはポテトを食べたい); 176. Anjō-san wa Umi ni Ikitai (安城さんは海に行きたい); 177. Toyota-san wa Yobikō ga Kowai (豊田さんは予備校が怖い); 178. Inuyama-kun no Suranpu (犬山くんのスランプ); 179. Inuyama-kun wa Sotsugyō Shitai (犬山くんは卒業したい); 180. Tōhi Kōdō Sukuranburu (逃避行動スクランブル); 181. Anjō-san wa Umi ni Ikenai (安城さんは海に行けない)
15	February 27, 2025	978-4-7859-7881-5	—	—
182. Anjō-san wa Umi de Asobitai (安城さんは海で遊びたい); 183. Anjō-san wa Shawā Shitai (安城さんはシャワーしたい); 184. Anjō-san no Yume wa Kanawanai (安城さんの夢は叶わない); 185. Anjō-san wa Onegai Shitai (安城さんはお願いしたい); 186. Anjō-san wa Chiyū ga suki (安城さんはちゅーが好き); 187. Anjō-san wa Yume o Kaku (安城さんは夢を描く); 188. Anjō-san wa Biyō ni Kuwashī (安城さんは美容に詳しい); 189. Seto-kun wa Anjō-san o Yurusanai (瀬戸くんは安城さんを許さない); 190. Anjō-san wa Ayamaritai (安城さんは謝りたい); 191. Anjō-san wa Kata o Momitai (安城さんは肩を揉みたい); 192. Toyoda-san wa Suizokukan ni Ikitai (豊田さんは水族館に行きたい); 193. Inuyama-kun wa Muitenai (大山くんは向いてない); 194. Anjō-san wa Benkyōdekiru (安城さんは勉強できる)
16	September 16, 2025	978-4-7859-8026-9	—	—
195. Anjō-san to Omamagoto (安城さんとおままごと); 196. Anjō-san wa Shikaku o Toritai (安城さんは資格を取りたい); 197. Inuyama-kun to Yatomi-sensei (犬山くんと弥富先生); 198. Inuyama-kun wa Me ga Samera (犬山くんは目が醒めら); 199. Toyoda-san to Enpitsu no Yogore (豊田さんと鉛筆の汚れ); 200. Tokio-kun wa Shinpaisei (トキオくんは心配性); 201. Chita-san no Yoku Shiru Tokio-kun (知多さんのよく知るトキオくん); 202. Tokio-kun no Jinsei Saidai no Doji (トキオくんの人生最大のドジ); 203. Anjō-san wa Kinoko Hakan (安城さんはきのこ派間); 204. Anjō-san to Kirakirashita Mukōgawa (安城さんとキラキラした向こう側); 205. Anjō-san wa Puranetariumu o Mitai (安城さんはプラネタリウムを見たい); 206. Seto-kun no Kirakirashita Mukōgawa (瀬戸くんのキラキラした向こう側); 207. Chita-san wa Naitopūru de Asobitai (知多さんはナイトプールで遊びたい)
17	April 27, 2026	978-4-7859-8174-7	—	—
208. Anjō-san wa Kanji o Oboeru made Kaerenai (安城さんは漢字を覚えるまで帰れない); 209. Chita-san wa Dōga ga Bazutta (知多さんは動画がバズった); 210. Anjō-san to Seto-kun wa Gikushakushiteru (安城さんと瀬戸くんはギクシャクしてる); 211. Otōsan no Ayamari-kata (お父さんの謝り方); 212. Anjō-san wa Shittosaretai (安城さんは嫉妬されたい); 213. Toyoda-san wa Uwaki o Yurusanai (豊田さんは浮気を許さない); 214. Inuyama-kun wa Neko ni Naru (犬山くんは猫になる); 215. Chita-san wa Ryōri Dōga o Toritai (知多さんは料理動画を撮りたい); 216. Tokio-kun wa Koraboshitakunai (トキオくんはコラボしたくない); 217. Chita-san wa Ōkui Dekinai (知多さんは大食いできない); 218. Chita-san wa Wakaranai (知多さんはわからない); 219. Chita-san wa Te o Tsunagenai (知多さんは手をつなげない); 220. Seto-kun ga Shitteru Anjō-san (瀬戸くんが知ってる安城さん); 221. Anjō-san to Faito da Nyā (安城さんとファイトだにゃー)

===== Ms. Komaki: The School Nurse At Anjo's School =====
No.	Release date	ISBN
1	July 13, 2020	978-4-7859-6709-3
1. Komaki-sensei no Onayami Sōdan (小牧先生のお悩み相談); 2. Komaki-sensei to Goshin-jutsu 〜 Chikan ni Attara? (小牧先生と護身術〜痴漢にあったら?); 3. Komaki-sensei to Jibun no Miryoku 〜 Jīkappu Konpurekkusu (小牧先生と自分の魅力〜Gカップコンプレックス); 4. Komaki-sensei no Shinro Sōdan 〜 Yume wa Gurabiaaidoru (小牧先生の進路相談〜夢はグラビアアイドル); 5. Komaki-sensei to Pātī 〜 Tomodachi to Kenkashitara? (小牧先生とパーティー〜友達とケンカしたら?); 6. Komaki-sensei to Kōryaku!〜 Koishi Chaimashita!? (小牧先生と攻略!〜恋しちゃいました!?); 7. Komaki-sensei to Risō no Sensei (小牧先生と理想の先生); 8. Komaki-sensei to Sutoretchi (小牧先生とストレッチ); 9. Komaki-sensei to Honto no Kimochi (小牧先生とホントの気持ち)
2	December 14, 2020	978-4-7859-6818-2
10. Komaki-sensei to Ki ni Naru Ano Ko (小牧先生と気になるあのコ); 11. Komaki-sensei to Kyōiku-teki Shidō (小牧先生と教育的指導); 12. Wasurerarenai Komaki-sensei (忘れられない小牧先生); 13. Komaki-sensei to Yoru no Gakkō (小牧先生と夜の学校); 14. Komaki-sensei to Risō no Otona (小牧先生と理想のオトナ); 15. Komaki-sensei to Asuka-sensei (小牧先生と飛鳥先生); 16. Komaki-sensei to Shitagi Ressun (小牧先生と下着レッスン); 17. Komaki-sensei to Bunkamatsuri (小牧先生と文化祭)
3	July 12, 2021	978-4-7859-6946-2
18. Komaki-sensei to Oshi Katsu (小牧先生と推し活); 19. Komaki-sensei no Otetsudai (小牧先生のお手伝い); 20. Komaki-sensei to Barentain (小牧先生とバレンタイン); 21. Komaki-sensei to Haru no Deai (小牧先生と春の出会い); 22. Komaki-sensei to Ohanami (小牧先生とお花見); 23. Komaki-sensei to Ame no Hapuningu (小牧先生と雨のハプニング); 24. Komaki-sensei o Hitorijime (小牧先生をひとり占め); 25. Hoken-shitsu no Komaki-sensei (保健室の小牧先生)

===== Anjo the Mischievous Gal and Friends: First Year Edition =====
No.	Release date	ISBN
1	December 23, 2019	978-4-7859-6582-2
Chapters Yancha 1 (やんちゃ 1) – Yancha 14 (やんちゃ 14)
2	July 13, 2020	978-4-7859-6708-6
Chapters Yancha 15 (やんちゃ 15) – Yancha 26 (やんちゃ 26); Bonus: "Koala Gal" (ギャルコアラちゃん, Gyaru Koara-chan)
3	December 14, 2020	978-4-7859-6817-5
Chapters Yancha 27 (やんちゃ 27) – Yancha 37 (やんちゃ 37)
4	July 12, 2021	978-4-7859-6582-2
Chapters Yancha 38 (やんちゃ 38) – Yancha 48 (やんちゃ 48)
5	December 13, 2021	978-4-7859-7051-2
Chapters Yancha 49 (やんちゃ 49) – Yancha 59 (やんちゃ 59)
6	December 12, 2022	978-4-7859-7289-9
Chapters Yancha 60 (やんちゃ 60) – Yancha 77 (やんちゃ 77); "Final Chapter" (最終話, Saishū Hanashi)

===== Komaki-sensei no Dungeon Hoken Dayori feat. Yancha Gal no Anjō-san =====
No.	Release date	ISBN
1	August 7, 2023	978-4-7859-7453-4
1. Komaki-sensei, Shōkansareru (小牧先生、 召喚される。); 2. Komaki-sensei, Hoken-shitsu o Tsukuru (小牧先生、 保健室を作る); 3. Komaki-sensei, Meshi o Kū (小牧先生、飯を食う。); 4. Komaki-sensei, Raibaru to Arasou (小牧先生、ライバルと争う。); 5. Komaki-sensei, Raibaru to Wakaisuru (小牧先生、ライバルと和解する。); 6. Komaki-sensei, Sukiru Hanmeisuru (小牧先生、スキル判明する。); 7. Komaki-sensei, Onore no Chikara o Shiru (小牧先生、己の力を知る。); 8. Komaki-sensei, Chōeki 30-nichi Kao no Otoko ni Au (小牧先生、 懲役30日顔の男に会う。); 9. Komaki-sensei, Ayashige na Tamago o Shokusu (小牧先生、 怪しげな卵を食す。); 10. Komaki-sensei, Mushiba to Tatakau (小牧先生、虫歯と闘う。); 11. Komaki-sensei, Inuyama no Nayami o Kiku (小牧先生、イヌヤマの悩みを聞く。); 12. Komaki-sensei, Sengan o Oshieru (小牧先生、 洗顔を教える。)
2	August 26, 2024	978-4-7859-7748-1
13. Komaki-sensei, Sakyubasu to Sōgūsuru (小牧先生、サキュバスと遭遇する。); 14. Komaki-sensei, Sakyubasu to Taiwasuru (小牧先生、サキュバスと対話する。); 15. Komaki-sensei, Sakyubasu no Nayami o Kaiketsusuru (小牧先生、サキュバスの悩みを解決する。); 16. Komaki-sensei, Saikō no Chōmiryō o Sagasu (小牧先生、最高の調味料を探す。); 17. Komaki-sensei, Reberu Age ni Isoshimu (小牧先生、レベル上げに勤しむ。); 18. Komaki-sensei, Shin no Teiji no Shinzui ni Fureru (小牧先生、神の提示の真髄に触れる。); 19. Toyo Sokkuri-san, Ippo Fumidasu (トヨそっくりさん、一歩踏み出す。); 20. Komaki-sensei, Shin Sōbi o Morau (小牧先生、新装備をもらう。); 21. Komaki-sensei, Nazo no Korekutā to Deau (小牧先生、謎のコレクターと出会う。); 22. Komaki-sensei, Danjon no Kiki o Shiru (小牧先生、ダンジョンの危機を知る。); 23. Komaki-sensei, Himitsu no Onsen ni Hairu (小牧先生、 秘密の温泉に入る。); 24. Komaki-sensei, Reberuappusuru (小牧先生、 レベルアップする。); 25. Komaki-sensei, Itchi Danketsusuru (小牧先生、一致団結する。); 26. Komaki-sensei, Danjon Onsen o Hiraku (小牧先生、 ダンジョン温泉を開く。); 27. Komaki-sensei wa, Shōkansareru (小牧先生は、召喚される。)

=== Other media ===
A voice comic of the first volume of Anjo the Mischievous Gal was released on March 31, 2022. An ASMR audio clip, featuring Mai Kadowaki as Anjo, was released on July 31, 2024.

== Reception ==
Anjo the Mischievous Gal has been compared to other "teasing" romantic comedy manga, specifically Teasing Master Takagi-san, Uzaki-chan Wants to Hang Out!, and Don't Toy with Me, Miss Nagatoro, in that the four manga all share a similar story structure that revolves around a schoolgirl and a schoolboy who start as friends that simply hang out together, then slowly develop into a romantic couple with the flirtatious girl teasing, or "bullying" the boy, who in turn has intimate feelings for the girl, but is too shy to admit them to her.

In 2019, the series was nominated for the 5th Next Manga Awards in the print category and finished 19th out of 50 nominees. It was also nominated for AnimeJapan's Manga We Want to See Animated Ranking that same year, and again in 2023, but failed to place in the top 10 in both years. The series was ranked eighth in the 4th Tsutaya Comic Awards in 2020.

Across the entire series, the manga had 1.2 million copies in circulation by August 2023.

== Works cited ==
- "Ch." is shortened form for chapter and refers to a chapter number of the Anjo the Mischievous Gal manga.

== See also ==
- Eureka Seven: AO, another manga series by the same author
