= Shonan Bakusozoku =

Japanese manga series

- Shonan Bakusozoku: Bomber Bikers of Shonan
- Cover of the first volume of the Kodansha release

湘南爆走族 (Shōnan Bakusōzoku)
- Genre: Yankī
- Manga
- Written by: Satoshi Yoshida
- Published by: Shōnen Gahōsha
- Magazine: Shōnen King
- Original run: 1982 – 1987
- Volumes: 16
- Manga

Shonan Bakusozoku First Flag
- Written by: Satoshi Yoshida
- Published by: Akita Shoten
- Magazine: Young Champion No. 3
- Original run: January 11, 2022 – present
- Volumes: 4
- Adaptations
- 12 OVA episodes (1986–1999); Live-action film (1987)

Shonan Bakusozoku: Bomber Bikers of Shonan (Japanese: 湘南爆走族, Hepburn: Shōnan Bakusōzoku) is a Japanese manga series written and illustrated by Satoshi Yoshida. It was serialized in Shōnen Gahōsha's Shōnen King magazine from 1982 to 1987 and published in 16 volumes. A prequel has been serialized in Young Champion No. 3 since January 2022, with its individual chapters collected into three volumes. The series has been adapted into 12 OVAs and a live-action film.

== Media ==
=== Manga ===
Written and illustrated by Satoshi Yoshida, the series originated as a one-shot published in Shōnen Gahōsha's Shōnen King magazine in August 1982. The one-shot was turned into a full series, which was serialized in Shōnen King from 1982 to 1987. Shōnen Gahōsha collected the series' individual chapters into 16 tankōbon volumes. The series has been re-released by Kodansha, Akita Shoten, and Shogakukan. A new one-shot for the series was published in Shogakukan's Big Comic in 2017.

A prequel series, titled Shonan Bakusozoku First Flag, began serialization in Akita Shoten's Young Champion No. 3 magazine on January 11, 2022. As of November 2024, Akita Shoten has collected its individual chapters into four tankōbon volumes.

=== Anime ===
12 original video animation (OVA) episodes, animated by Toei Animation, were released from 1986 to 1999. AnimEigo released the first OVA (subbed) in North America on VHS.

=== Live-action ===
A live-action film adaptation, directed by Daiki Yamada and starring Yōsuke Eguchi and Yūji Oda, was released in 1987.

== Reception ==
Mike Toole of Anime News Network described the series as a "hit" and "major phenomenon" in Japan. However, he also noted that "Shonan Bosozoku completely failed to resonate with American fans".

The series has 29 million copies in circulation.
