= Battle Club =

Japanese manga series

- Cover of Battle Club Volume 1

バトルクラブ (Batoru Kurabu)
- Genre: Martial arts
- Manga
- Written by: Yuji Shiozaki
- Published by: Shōnen Gahōsha
- English publisher: AUS: Madman Entertainment; NA: Tokyopop
- Magazine: Young King
- Original run: April 28, 2004 – March 7, 2006
- Volumes: 6
- Manga

Battle Club 2nd Stage
- Written by: Yuji Shiozaki
- Published by: Shōnen Gahōsha
- Magazine: Young King
- Original run: 2008 – 2009
- Volumes: 3

Battle Club (Japanese: バトルクラブ, Hepburn: Batoru Kurabu) is a Japanese manga series written and illustrated by Yuji Shiozaki. The series follows Mokichi and Tamako, two high school students who are members of the Swan Academy Wrestling Club. This manga is well-known for its extensive amount of fan service.

== Storyline ==
Battle Club had six volumes. Each volume is subdivided into Rounds. After volume six, the manga was followed by a sequel called Battle Club 2nd Stage, which ran for three volumes.

=== Volume 1 ===
- Round 1

Mokichi attempts to become the "dominant male" at Swan Academy Senior High School by beating everyone with a baseball bat. Unimpressed, a senior student punches him, causing him to collide with Tamako. Mokichi challenges Tamako, who soundly beats him, after which he is stripped of his pants and tied to a fence half-naked. Embarrassed, he enters the Swan Wrestling Club where he witnesses Tamako being punished for failing an errand. Seeing the girl who beat him be beaten, he requests to join the club.

- Round 2

To join the Swan Wrestling Club, Mokichi must move Tamako, who is in a lying position. Unable to move her with traditional means, he strips her panties, startling Tamako, and then flips her.

- Round 3

Mokichi is beaten-up in a bathroom by a group of students. He is saved by Rentarou Taki, the president of the Wrestling Club. Taki challenges Mokichi to train harder if he ever wants to truly be strong.

- Round 4

Tamako is late getting to school to take an exam. She decides to run rather than take the train. She strips off extra weight and clothes to become more aerodynamic. She witnesses Mokichi being beaten once again and comes to his rescue, losing even more clothes in the process.

- Round 5

With Tamako unconscious from the previous fight, Mokichi is at the mercy of the school Karate Club. Vice-Captain, Higuchi, comes to his rescue this time. After defeating the Karate Club, she takes her aggression out on Tamako for failing.

- Round 6

Unable to concentrate on his training with Tamako, Mokichi goes to the bathroom to masturbate. While there, he witnesses the Karate Club being punished by their leader, Shiba. After beating her fellow club members, she declares war on the Wrestling Club. Mokichi decides to warn the others.

- Round 7

Shiba discovers Mokichi and begins to fight him. Tamako discovers the two of them and is challenged by Shiba. Shiba's attacks have no effect on Tamako. Shiba uses the forbidden "kamehamehou" move and exhausts her ki. Shiba is left defeated.

- Round 8

Shiba experiences sexual lesbian fantasies with Tamako. Not being able to control these feelings, she meets up with Tamako. She sees that Mokichi is also attracted to Tamako and she runs off, where she meets up with the Karate Club. They expel her for the unauthorized war, unauthorized move and her defeat. Shiba then beats up the Karate Club.

- Round 9

The Wrestling Club conducts training at the beach. Tamako is scared of the water, so Mokichi declares he will swim his own portion as well as hers. While swimming, he is chased by a shark. Tamako calls the shark to her, catches it, and performs a suplex move on it. The volume ends with the team eating the shark at a team meal.

=== Volume 2 ===
- Round 1

Tamako has lost 3000 yen. She enters a curry eating contest for 5000 yen. While there, a mysterious dark-skinned girl with large breasts keeps up with plate-for-plate. Tamako gets the 5000 yen and earns another handed to her by the girl, after which the girl runs away. Meanwhile, the Wrestling Club is training. The mystery girl appears and announces herself as Kuniko Mukoda, a member of the Black Dragon Wrestling Club, the team that made it as finalists during the preceding year's interhigh wrestling tournament. She has been hired by Tondemon to challenge the club, and even proudly states that "she's more than enough" for the whole club. In a match, she immediately proves herself capable of living up to this claim, easily outclassing Vice-Captain Higuchi and winning in points.

Mukoda pins Higuchi, forcing the latter to contemplate the skills her opponent has shown so far, as well as her physique (Mukoda was smothering her with her breasts). Higuchi suddenly breaks free of Mukoda's pin, followed by a quick maneuver in an attempt to suplex the latter. Mukoda uses her leg to effectively counter Higuchi's suplex, and Higuchi is pinned again, with her face near Mukoda's crotch. Positioned for a fall, Higuchi becomes desperate. She attempts to destabilize Mukoda by jamming her index finger through Mukoda's anus, a trick which was used against Tamako much earlier. Mukoda was unfazed, however, saying that she's "had bigger things up her 'back door'". She proceeds to finish Higuchi off while simultaneously telling her that she's the weakest member of Black Dragon Academy Club, completely ignoring Tondemon's protests. Mukoda ultimately defeats Higuchi, and soon after, Tamako arrives.

- Round 2

Tamako challenges Mukoda to a match to avenge her teammates. As a gesture of fair play, Mukoda proposes that Tamako only needs to score one point to win. A battle ensues where Tamako experiences more difficulty against Mukoda than Higuchi did. During the match, she learns that Mukoda, even while in a casual stance, has little to no weak spots (with her breasts making her a difficult target), so Tamako resorts to a feint and manages to penetrate Mukoda's defenses enough to lift Mukoda off her feet. Before she could complete the move, Mukoda jams her finger in Tamako's anus, a move that was previously used against her in the previous round. Tamako yelps in pain, as Mukoda is also gripping her posterior with one of her fingers, stabbing Tamako's anus. Mukoda is thankful for being subjected to the same humiliation before by Higuchi; otherwise, she'd have lost to Tamako by now. She proceeds to further penetrate Tamako's anus, causing the humiliated girl incapacitating pain. Mukoda then proceeds to use one finishing move after another against Tamako, who shows intense stamina and endurance. This forces Mukoda to apply a butterfly suplex, causing a significant amount of damage to the gym. Mukoda leaves victorious with Tondemon, who thanks her for helping him demonstrate to the club that they need to take training more seriously, when Mukoda suddenly trips. This reveals that she was somewhat fatigued from her match with Tamako.

- Round 3

Higuchi is demoralized and contemplating quitting the Wrestling Club. Tondemon is telling stories of the club's past. Tamako is inspired to get stronger for the sake of Higuchi and she sets off with Mokichi to find Higashi, the coach of the club, at Ihi Peak. They set off for the mountains of Shinshuu to find him. Tamako braves several challenges and eventually finds Higashi, who is revealed to be Tondemon Sensai.

- Round 4

Tamako and Mokichi are working Higashi's field as part of their training. Higashi then presents them with a challenge. They must simply touch a panda he claims to have raised for 20 years. Mokichi gives up easily, but Tamako does not and eventually plucks a few hairs from the panda before she collapses unconscious. The panda is revealed to be Captain Taki, who was naked inside a panda suit. Meanwhile, Higuchi is challenged to a fight, but backs down in fear. A side-ef ect of her loss to Kuniko, Higuchi gets beaten up as a result.

- Round 5

Mokichi and Tondemon are watching the girls naked in a hot spring. Taki wrestles with Tamako naked. Shiba is also at the hot spring with the Wrestling Club. In a flashback we find she had saved Higuchi from her challenge in the previous chapter, and Higuchi teases Shiba about her infatuation with Tamako. The naked girls find only Mokichi watching them and give him a serious pounding. Later, Tondemon tells the club about secret scrolls guarded by four guardians that reveal secret martial arts training. Tamako and Mokichi set off to get the scrolls.

- Round 6

Tamako has charged off in search of the scrolls. She and Mokichi are attacked by dogs and Mokichi is already willing to give up. Here they meet Jikoku, one of the four kings of heaven. He places a key in the middle of an unstable foot bridge. Tamako and Mokichi must get the key in order to win the challenge. Mokichi charges towards the key, but breaks a board and falls through. He is hung up on a splinter of wood. Tamako begins on the bridge to save Mokichi, but she is too heavy on the unstable bridge. To lighten herself, she strips all of her clothes except her underpants It works.

- Round 7

Tamako is still naked and still moving towards Mokichi and finally saves him. Jikoku had not moved from his place on the bridge out of fear of breaking it. Therefore, Tamako is declared the winner of the challenge. Jikoku goes to give Tamako the key, but the bridge now breaks. Mokichi is safe, but Tamako and Jikoku fall. Tamako grabs Jikoku and somehow grow butterfly wings and flies Jikoku to safety. She continues to fall and lands in the water below. She awakens at the bottom on land to be greeted by a small girl in a bathing suit. She is Koumoku, another of the four kings.

=== Volume 3 ===
- Round 1

Koumoku challenges Tamako (still naked) to find the next key at the bottom of the river she has just thrown it into. Tamako makes several attempts, but fails. On land, she learns from Kongoa that Koumoku has become like a fish because of an event with her father and an axe that holds his spirit. Koumoku had lost her father's axe in the river attempting to lift it. For some reason, Koumoku's father does not wear pants. Tamako had seen the axe while looking for the key and dives in to retrieve it.

- Round 2

Tamako guides Koumoku to the axe, but while attempting to lift it, Koumoku becomes pinned underneath the axe. Koumoku now realizes that it was not the axe her father care about, but her. Tamako dives again and saves Koumoku, but passes out when she has freed Koumoku. Now, Koumoku saves Tamako and brings her to the surface. Because Tamako saved Koumoku, she admits defeat and awards Tamako the key.

- Round 3

Tamako, finally with a shirt, has returned to Mokichi who has been battling the third of the elite four, Zouchou. Zouchou attacks Tamako and Shiba steps in to the fight. Shiba becomes distracted when she inadvertently sees Tamako's nipples. Mokichi throws Shiba onto Zouchou. Tamako takes this opportunity to run up to the shrine. Shiba continues to fight Zouchou and ultimately passes out. Higuchi appears and is now ready to fight Zoucho, but still afraid, she cowers. Molkichi takes the opportunity to sneak attach Zouchou and takes a beating. Higuchi now becomes brave and challenges Zouchou, who she now has recognized as Sensai Tondemon.

- Round 4

Flashback to when Higuchi was new to the school. Higuchi beats up boys and the president of the Kendo Club. She also challenged Tondemon, whom she mistook for a janitor. He beats her and forces her to join the Wrestling Club by blackmailing her with a compromising picture he took of her while unconscious. Back to the present, Higuchi is battling Tondemon. Her bravery against him awards them the victory. Meanwhile, Tamako has climbed to the top of the mountain.

- Round 5

On top of the Mount Ibuki, Tamako is face to face with herself in a wrestling ring. They begin to battle. Below, Mokichi becomes overcome and gropes Higuchi thinking it is Tamako. He is overcome by gas emitted from the mountain, which is what is causing Tamako to also hallucinate. The final of the elite four is Tamon, her own heart. She continues to fight herself, questioning why she fights and why she likes it. She flashes back to her own mother, Tamami, as a wrestler. She sees her mother win a championship match and her decision to retire from the sport.

- Round 6

Still in the flashback/hallucination, it is revealed Tamami has heart disease and must retire or die. She is also revealed to be pregnant and the doctors are not sure the fetus will survive. Tamami decides not to abort the unborn child, which will be Tamako. She dies in child birth. Back to the present, Tamako now realizes that she was meant to live and that she does have purpose. However, she has fallen from the tower and grabs a small ledge on the side of a cliff and catapults herself back to the top to finish the fight. She wins the fight in a tremendous explosion that destroys the tower. She finds the shrine, but leaves the key in front of the lock.

- Round 7

Back at the school, Mokichi continues his training but is frustrated and threatens to quit. He is bullied once again by classmates. A fight starts and Mokichi realizes that he has indeed become stronger, but immediately cowers when a thug reveals a dagger and intimidated him with it. A mysterious girl wearing a hat and a bracelet reading N.O.B. joins the fight and beats up the boy harassing Mokichi. Mokichi becomes infatuated with her.

=== Volume 4 ===
- Round 1

Tamako is invited to join a secret organisation called Nightmare of Battle (NOB). Mokichi, still infatuated with the mystery girl, rejoins the Wrestling Club to get stronger. At night, he seeks her out and stumbles across NOB. They find him and the mystery girl is ready to punish him.

- Round 2

The girl is identified as Ijyuin Shizuka, an NOB punisher. She tells Mokichi that she has to kill him for his trespassing on NOB. She challenges to Mokichi that if he can lay even one finger on her, he wins. She beats him badly, but he is able to touch her and wins. Shizuka leaves in shame.

- Round 3

The Swan Academy Wrestling Club has their first practice match with Shark Island High School. Many of the wrestlers were seen in the NOB fight the night before. The school is in bad shape, students do drugs and a girl is having sex with three boys in the men's bathroom. Mokichi decides to use the women's bathroom instead. A girl going to the bathroom beats him up.

- Round 4

Mokichi is first for the practice match and his opponent is the girl who just beat him up in the bathroom. She does whatever it takes to win, including illegal moves. Mokichi accidentally strips Ono Imoko of her uniform. Tamako becomes sick from a drink Papa had made for her.

- Round 5

The fight between Imoko and Mokichi continues and he is losing badly, but his endurance keeps him going throughout the match. Finally, he sees and opening, takes it and flips her. The blast destroys the Space Shuttle orbiting the Earth. They both end up in the infirmary.

- Round 6

It is time for Tamako's match and she fights Akutagawa. Tamako dominates the match with her speed and wrestling ability. She throws Akutagawa from the ring.

- Round 7

Akutagawa decides to use all his strength in fighting Tamako and begins to humiliate her in the match. He questions to her, "What is wrestling?, What does it mean to win? and What does Kiai really mean?" Tamako can not answer the questions.

- Round 8

Tamako is back at the curry shop eating with Mukouda once again. She is upset about her loss to Akutagawa. Mukouda challenges Tamako to a video game where the loser has to strip a piece of clothing. They are challenged by local boys to a fight where they easily win. Tamako begins to regain her confidence.

=== Volume 5 ===
- Round 1

Mokichi is determined to raise Tamako's spirit by bringing her to the movies, dinner and a romantic roof top. However, Akutagawa is on the roof top in the middle of an NOB fight that he is losing. After the fight, the victor, Dazai, drops his NOB bracelet and leaves. Tamako pursues him rooftop to rooftop.

- Round 2

Akutagawa tells Mokichi that the fight was part of the NOB Death Tournament. Tamako catches Dazai who challenges her to a fight if she can catch him. Dazai runs off and in the process of chasing him, Tamako loses her panties. She catches up to him, grabs him and they fall together off the roof.

- Round 3

Tamako is unconscious and Dazai runs off before Mokichi shows up. Back at the Wrestling Club, Tamako asks Tondemon to teach her other martial arts to incorporate into wrestling. He violently refuses stating that he will not make that mistake again as he did with her. Meanwhile, Higuchi is having a naked, lesbian fantasy before she is interrupted to attend a meeting. Tamako is identified as the next target of NOB.

- Round 4

Mokichi meets up with Jikoku, who it now appears is also a member of NOB. Jikoku attacks Mokichi and tells him he will take his arm off. Meanwhile, Higuchi is attacked by Koumoku, another of the elite four and member of NOB.

- Round 5

Koumoku attacks Higuchi with weapons and throws her from a rooftop into the water. It is revealed that Komouku and other members of NOB practice collective martial arts and not simply wrestling. Higuchi is underwater and is about to be killed, but she regains consciousness and her strength to battle Koumoku. Tamako is given a message to go through the sewers to meet Tondemon.

- Round 6

Higuchi now has the upper hand on Koumoku who gets her to give up by tickling her. Tondemon is now challenged by Mukoda and the fight between Mokichi and Jikoku continues. Tamako went through the sewers as instructed, only to find a trap by Dazai. Before fighting, she falls asleep. Mokichi calls upon his kiai for super strength and defeats Jikoku.

- Round 7

Tamako awakens to find Dazai waiting for her. Rather than fight her, Dazai tells her about NOB's plot to destroy the Swan Academy Wrestling Club and advises her to leave. Mokoda and Tondemon continue to fight a fierce battle while Mokichi finds Higuchi and Tamako jumps on a plank in the sewer that she attempts to ride to find the others. She falls in and Dazai saves her, but they are both now taken by the current.

- Round 8

Tamako and Dazai awaken on dry land after going over a waterfall. Tamako continues her pursuit to find the others. She finds Tondemon, Higuchi and Mokichi unconscious when she is attacked by Mokoda. Tamako and Mukoda fight with Mokichi mildly interfering. Tamako questions why Mukoda is doing this.

- Round 9

The fight between Tamako and Mukoda continues when Dazai interferes. He instructs Tamako to take the others and run while he now fights Mokoda. Tamako carries all three to safety. Tondemon awakens and tells a story of Mokouda. In the flashback, Mokouda was a student of Tondemon's where he was grooming her to be the next champion in the spirit of Tamami, Tamako's mother. He is exceptionally hard on her to the point where Mokouda questions whether or not he likes her. She overhears him talking about her in comparing her to Tamami. She is offended and pledges to kill Tondemon when she becomes stronger than him.

=== Volume 6 ===
- Round 1

Tamako and Mukoda continue their epic battle. Tondemon confesses to Taki that he set Tamako up to fight Mukoda because he wanted Mukoda to understand the true value of wrestling. Mukoda beats Tamako and begins to realize Tondemon's intentions. Tondemon arrives and explains himself, the two once again engage in battle. Tamako awakens to see Mukoda lying beside her unconscious drooling. Tondemon leaves and is never seen again.

This ends the main storyline of Battle Club. The remaining rounds are short stories focused on the ancillary characters.

- Round 2 (Shiba)

Shiba continues to fantasize about her and Tamako having sex. She awakens from her fantasy to find herself in the middle of her class, and breaking her desk in half. She later spots Tamako with Mokichi after she detected the former through her "Tamako-sense". Shiba follows the two in the train, where she took the opportunity to grope around Tamako's privates; Tamako was able to grab Shiba's hand before she could go any further and, thinking quickly, Shiba made the excuse that she was testing Tamako's physique and remarks that she should be with the Karate Club. Contented with this explanation, Tamako and (a not-so-convinced) Mokichi invite Shiba to join them at the Community Sports Center for some physical rehab. At first she refuses, but then does not pass up the opportunity to see Tamako naked as well as the chance of scrubbing her back. Events then begin to play out as they had in her dream. Tamako challenges Shiba to see who can stay in the sauna the longest, with the loser joining the other's club. Shiba, at first, tries to refuse, but gives in after Tamako dares her for being afraid to lose. Tamako "wins" (not really, on account that she fainted) and Shiba joins the Wrestling Club (after recovering from trauma brought about by the experience). Mokichi decides to peep in on the women's side of the sauna and is arrested when he is discovered.

- Round 3 (Taki)

Taki tells the story of why he dresses as a girl and has amazing sweater puppies. The story goes back to when he was younger and bullies made him wear a skirt. A girl, Kaneko, sees the boys harassing what she believes to be a girl and thwarts them. She believes Taki to be a girl and encourages Taki to join her school, which is all-female, so he continues the guise. Kaneko trains Taki in wrestling, but Kaneko is challenged by the boys she once humiliated and Taki steps in. The boys identify Taki as the boy they once bullied and Kaneko now knows the truth and Taki leaves for Swan Academy. Taki then tells to Tamako and Mokichi that he just made up the story, but perhaps it was true.

- Round 4 (Higuchi)

Higuchi has recovered from her injuries, but is not allowed out of her home. We realize now that she comes from a very wealthy family. She wishes to leave the home and even tempts her guard with her breasts. Tamako and Mokichi decide to rescue her. Tamako endures several obstacles, guards and traps to eventually find Higuchi, only to find it was a contest between her, Taki and the guard. Higuchi had won and is now allowed to leave the house.

- Round 5 (Akutagawa)

Tamako, Mokichi and Shiba go to a restaurant to eat to find it is owned by Akutagawa's family and he works there. The restaurant is hounded by loan sharks, his parents have divorced and his father is hospitalized. Also, a similar business across the street, called Kanna Miller's, is using large breasted waitresses to attract customers. The club decides to help Akutagawa's business by working there and also using Tamako's "assets" as a waitress. Kana Miller's steps it up and their waitresses become even more "friendly". Akutagawa's restaurant hosts a contest where if the customer eats a bowl of soba faster than Tamako, you get 5,000 yen or she sheds a piece of clothing. Tamako always wins until a ringer beats her and she is fully naked. She is arrested for violating adult entertainment business laws. A wrecking ball then destroys the restaurant. Higuchi finds the gang and she discloses her family owns Kanna Miller's. She orders the store closed and Akutagawa's store flourishes.

- Round 6 (Nandaimon)

Mokichi is failing in his grades and the club starts tutoring him with unorthodox means (among of which involved Higuchi dressing up as a dominatrix and whipping up Mokichi to study even harder). A mysterious 100-year-old man arrives to train the club and communicates only with signs. Tamako is covered in words taped to her naked body. Mokichi gets to remove words he translates correctly, but seeing Tamako naked makes him tackle her. Mokichi ultimately passes his test, but Tamako fails because she was helping him. The 100-year-old man tells her she is fired. Mokichi poses naked in front of the entire school based on a joke Higuchi perpetrated. Tamako is still fired from the club but is allowed to reapply.

- Round 7 (Ghost Diver)

While cleaning the school pool, Tamako witnesses someone practicing their diving, but the water is shallow. The diver trains Tamako to swing and overcome her fear of the water. The diver is a ghost and only Tamako can see her. The diver-ghost instructs Tamako to practice diving, but there is not enough water in the pool. Mokichi sees this and stops her. Later, Taki and Mokichi confront the ghost as an evil spirit, attempting to release Tamako of its spell. The ghost tells her story... She was a diver 60 years ago when women were not allowed to participate. She was challenged by the men to dive from the highest board, but she became frightened at the height. She trained with Nandaimon and was ready to jump when she was killed during an allied air strike. Tamako and the Ghost Diver jump from the highest platform together. Tamako survives and is in the hospital from her injuries and the ghost diver is never heard from again.

== Characters ==
Mokichi Saitou
Mokichi is the main protagonist of the story. He is a bit of a loser and weakling. He is the only male member of the school wrestling club, (Taki does not count) which he does not mind at all. He enjoys the close wrestling moves and training with the girls, especially Tamako, on whom he has a crush. His drive to become stronger is topped only by his perverted nature, as he's been known to subconsciously outlast more powerful opponents in dangerously prolonged battles from time to time.
Tamako Kaneda
Tamako is a natural wrestler with incredible moves. However, she is very clumsy and often injures herself. She is absent minded often forgetting the names of people she just met, where she was going and what she was doing. A running throughout the (both) series is that her opponents frequently defeat Tamako, often by exploiting her "Achilles' Heel" kancho, which is by stuffing a finger through her nether regions (her anus or rectum) to trump her in any match. She has a never ending quest for Pocari for Higuchi. She is the heroine of the story and is ogled over by male and female characters in the story.
Tondemon Higashi
Head coach of the Wrestling Club and a "dirty old man." He led Swan Academy to eight successive all-Japan championships when Tamami was a member of the club. He is also one of the elite four, Zouchou. He had a falling out with Mukoda, who now wishes to hunt him down.
Rentarou Taki
Captain of the Wrestling Club. He is a cross-dresser but also has an incredible female body with large breasts, small waist and curvy hips. However, Taki is biologically male (hence him possessing male genitalia despite being physically female). He transferred to Swan Academy when he was kicked out of Black Cat Academy, an all-girls school.
Higuchi Ichiyo
Vice-Captain of the Wrestling Club and a lesbian who has the hots for Tamako. While a capable fighter (believed to be her school's strongest fighter), Higuchi, like Shiba with Tamako (whom Shiba is infatuated with), tends to get distracted easily during matches when fighting at the presence of buxom fighters like Mukoda or Kumouko. After losing a battle (handed to her by Mukoda), she lost her heart and will to fight, only to regain it much later in the first series. She is nicknamed "Queen of the Vampires". She also comes from a very wealthy family that owns a chain of restaurants among other things. Despite being a lesbian, she does not make a move on Tamako but certainly does not miss an opportunity to grope the girl's proportions during wrestling practices.
Shiba Ryoutarou
At first an adversary of the Wrestling Club, but she quits the Karate Club after having lesbian fantasies of Tamako. She is Mokichi's rival in both love and battle. A powerful fighter in her own right, Shiba specializes in using ki-based moves that further enhance her physical attacks to incredible degrees.
Kuniko Mukoda
Member of the Black Dragon Academy Wrestling Club. She has very large breasts and no shame in displaying them in public as she changes into her wrestling uniform in front of the crowd. A skilled wrestler, having bested Tamako not one but twice. Despite her skill, she is not above resorting to foul play, as seen when she incapacitated Tamako by using her finger to penetrate Tamako's rectum. She is referred to as "Tits McGee" by Mokichi and "Juggy McGee" by Tondemon. She originally attended Swan Academy, she quits after being emotionally hurt by Tondemom. She vows revenge.
Ginkakuji Tamami
Tamako's mother who died in child birth of a severe heart defect. She was a champion female wrestler at Swan Academy and a student of Tondemon. She won three national championships and 83 overall victories.
Ijyuin Shizuka
A N.O.B. punisher and member of the Shark Island High School Wrestling Club. Mokichi is infatuated by her, but that ends when she tries to kill him.
Ono Imoko
An inexperienced fighter with big boobs who is a member of the Shark Island High School Wrestling Club.
Akutagawa
A member of N.O.B. and member of the Shark Island High School Wrestling Club. Nicknamed "Gorilla Guy" by Tamako. He also owns a soba restaurant downtown that is facing financial difficulties.
Papa
Tamako's overly-muscular father. He assists the club and makes a special rejuvenating drink made with powdered protein, newt, deer penis and duck beak. It heals injuries, but also gives you the runs. He also observes his daughter naked from time to time. Parenting skills are questionable.
Dazai Osamu
One of the top three executives of N.O.B. His life is saved by Tamako and he pledges to repay her. He wears a patch over his right eye similar in style the one worn by Shimei from Ikki Tousen.
Kaneko Misuzu
Captain of the Black Cat Academy Wrestling Club, an all-girls school and once the object of Taki's pining. She takes in Taki believing she is a girl. She later learns that he is not during a fight.
Nandaimon
100 year old janitor of the school who takes over Tandemon's role as Wrestling Club advisor when he disappears. He often trains the club by having them do his janitor work cleaning pools and pulling weeds.
Ghost Diver
A girl who attended Swan Academy during World War II. She was killed in an air strike and now haunts the school pool.
The Elite Four
Ancient deities who guard an ancient scroll that is a manual for martial arts training. They are also known as the four kings of heaven, Koumoku, Tamon, Zouchou and Jikoku.
