= Young Comic =

Japanese manga magazine

- September 2009 issue of Young Comic
- Categories: Seinen manga
- Frequency: Monthly
- Circulation: 112,000 (2008)
- First issue: August 10, 1967
- Company: Shōnen Gahōsha
- Country: Japan
- Language: Japanese
- Website: www.shonengahosha.co.jp

Young Comic (Japanese: ヤングコミック, Hepburn: Yangu Komikku) is a long-running Japanese seinen manga magazine started in 1967 as a magazine aimed for adult men competing with titles like Manga Action and Big Comic. Today it primarily targets a young adult male audience with contents tilting heavily toward sex, nudity, and gratuitous fan service. It is published monthly by Shōnen Gahōsha as a sister publication to Young King. Its circulation in 2008 was reported at 112,000 copies.

== Related magazines ==
- Young King OURs
- Young King
