= Anna Ishibashi =

Japanese model and actress (born 1992)

- 石橋 杏奈
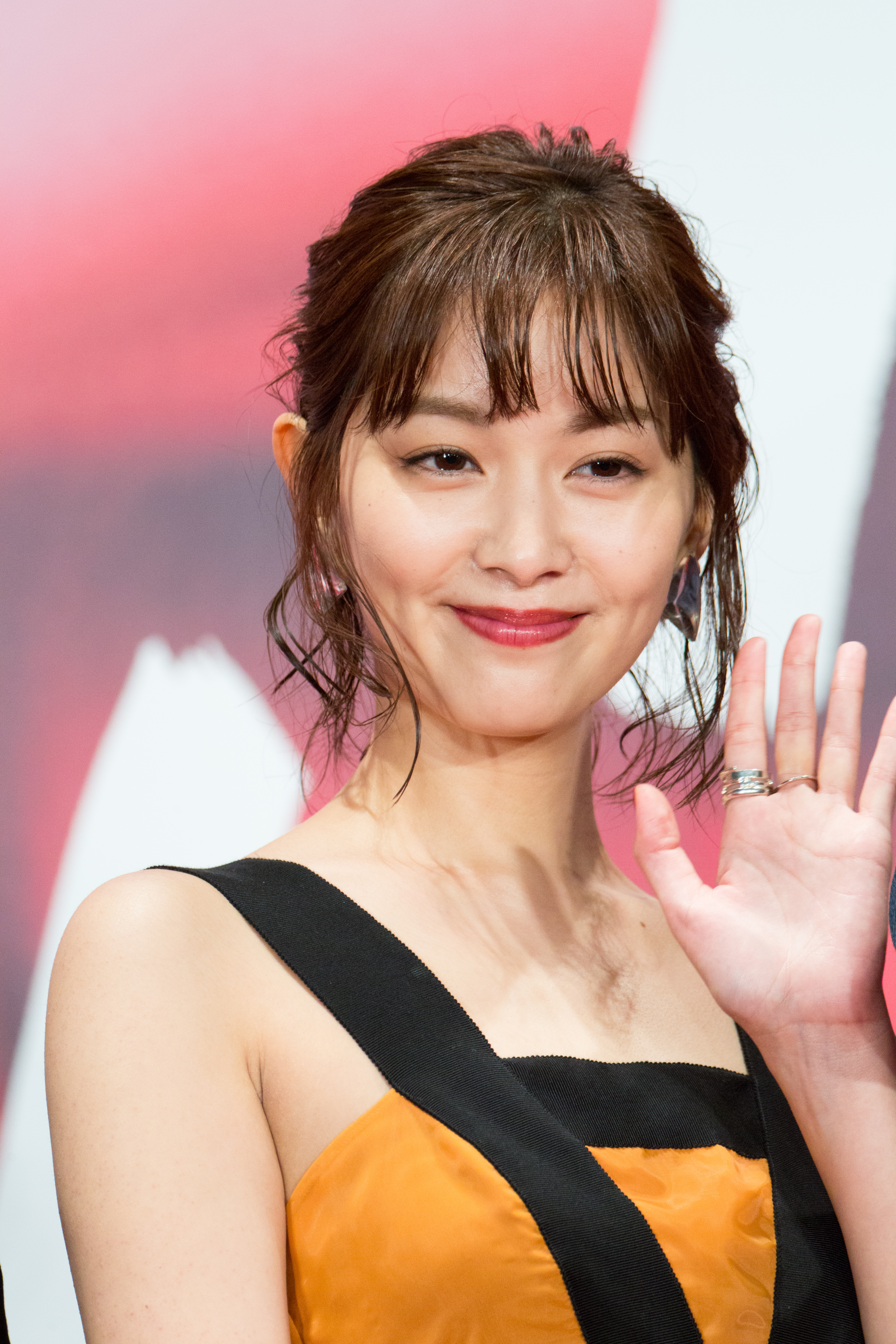
- Ishibashi at the Tokyo International Film Festival in October 2017
- Born: July 12, 1992 (age 33); Fukuoka Prefecture, Japan
- Occupation: Actress
- Years active: 2007–present
- Height: 1.62 m (5 ft 4 in)
- Spouse: Yuki Matsui (m. 2018)
- Children: 2

Anna Ishibashi (石橋 杏奈, Ishibashi An'na; born July 12, 1992) is a Japanese actress and model.

== Career ==
Ishibashi starred in Ryuichi Hiroki's Your Friend in 2008. She was given a Best New Talent award at the 2008 Yokohama Film Festival. She appeared in Koji Maeda's Cannonball Wedlock in 2011.

== Personal life ==
Ishibashi married professional baseball pitcher Yuki Matsui in 2018. In May 2020, she announced the birth of their first child, a daughter, and on October 14, 2022, Ishibashi gave birth to the couple's second child, a son.

== Filmography ==
=== Films ===
- Your Friend (2008) as Emi Izumi
- Akai Ito (2008) as Asami Tadokoro
- Time Traveller: The Girl Who Leapt Through Time (2010) as young Kazuko Yoshiyama
- Cannonball Wedlock (2011) as Mika
- Paper Flower (2011) as Asuka
- My Back Page (2011) as Shigeko
- Milocrorze (2011) as Yuri
- Yume no Kayoiji (2012) as Mari Miyazawa
- The Millennial Rapture (2012) as Yukino
- Fuan no Tane (2013) as Yoko
- Heart Beat (2013) as Kayo
- Girl in the Sunny Place (2013)
- L DK (2014) as Satsuki Mizuno
- My Pretend Girlfriend (2014)
- Tremble All You Want (2017)
- The Stand-In Thief (2017)
- Memoirs of a Murderer (2017)
- Linking Love (2017)
- Color Me True (2018)
- Butterfly Sleep (2018)
- Hatsukoi Loss Time (2019)

=== Television ===
- Akai Ito (TV series) (2008-2009) as Asami Tadokoro
- Ohisama (2011)
- Sherlock Holmes (2014) as Mary Morstan (voice)
- Gunshi Kanbei (2014)
- Hana Moyu (2015)
- The Emperor's Cook (2015) as Mitsuko Takahama
- Kenji Miyazawa's Table (2017) as Toshi Miyazawa
