= Miho Yamada =

Japanese voice actress and narrator (born 1973)

- 山田 みほ
- Born: November 11, 1973 (age 52); Yokohama, Kanagawa, Japan
- Occupations: Voice actress; narrator
- Years active: 1995–present
- Agent: Crazy Box

Miho Yamada (山田 みほ, Yamada Miho; born November 11, 1973 in Yokohama, Kanagawa) (real name/old stage name,山田 美穂) is a Japanese voice actress and narrator who was formerly part of Arts Vision. She is currently affiliated with Crazy Box.

== Notable voice roles ==
=== Anime ===
- Banner of the Stars as Atosryac Ssynec Atosr Lymh Faibdacr Loïc
- Black Heaven as Layla Yuki
- Blue Drop: Tenshitachi no Gikyoku as Yuko Sugawara
- Comic Party as Minami Makimura
- Dear Boys as Keiko Ōgami
- Futari Ecchi as Mika Yabuki
- Gakuen Alice as Serina Yamada
- Godannar as Ecaterina
- The Good Witch of the West as Sister Naomi
- Horizon in the Middle of Nowhere as Yoshiki Aoi
- Horizon in the Middle of Nowhere II as Yoshiki Aoi, Robert Dudley
- Iketeru Futari as Yuki Umemiya
- Inuyasha as Tsubaki (young form)
- Invincible King Tri-Zenon as Sora Munakata
- Izumo: Takeki Tsurugi no Senki as Nogiri
- Karakurizōshi Ayatsuri Sakon as Kaoruko Tachibana
- Kirby: Right Back at Ya! as Lalala
- Love Get Chu as Junko Wakatsuki
- Magic User's Club as Miki Mizusawa
- Mobile Suit Gundam Seed Destiny as Sara
- Ouran High School Host Club as Chizuru Maihara
- PaRappa the Rapper as Robot, Marie the Dog
- Peach Girl as Morika
- Pet Shop of Horrors as Q-chan
- Pokémon as Shijima's wife (ep 209)
- Saki series as Takako Kubo
- Spiral: The Bonds of Reasoning as Takako Adachi
- Trinity Blood as Mary Spencer
- Witch Hunter Robin as Keiko Muramatsu
- Yukikaze as Edith Foss

=== Game ===
- Karin Kanzuki in Street Fighter Zero 3, Capcom Fighting Jam, Namco × Capcom
- Constable Neyla in Sly 2: Band of Thieves
- Crowdia in Rhapsody: A Musical Adventure
- Minami Makimura in Comic Party
- Yayoi Orikura in First Kiss Story
- Maeka Kudanshita in Tokimeki Memorial 2
- Norma Kissleigh in Rogue Galaxy
- Salvatore in Disgaea 3: Absence of Justice

=== Drama CDs ===
- Fujiko Amacha in 7 Seeds

=== Tokusatsu ===
- Princess Multiwa in Chōriki Sentai Ohranger
- Merudameruda in Seijuu Sentai Gingaman
- Grand Witch Grandene in Kyuukyuu Sentai GoGoFive/Kyuukyuu Sentai GoGoFive vs Gingaman

=== Dubbing ===
- Black Dawn as Agent Amanda Stuart (Tamara Davies)
- The Bucket List as Angelica (Rowena King)
- Mr. & Mrs. Smith (2008 NTV edition) as Jane Smith (Angelina Jolie)
- Jennifer's Body as Jennifer Check (Megan Fox)
- Lakeview Terrace as Lisa Mattson (Kerry Washington)
- The Namesake as Moushumi Majumdar (Zuleikha Robinson)
- No Way Out as Susan Atwell (Sean Young)
- Saturday Night Fever as Annette (Donna Pescow)
- Scream 3 as Sarah Darling (Jenny McCarthy)
