= Shiori's Diary =

Japanese manga series

- First tankōbon volume cover

しおりの日記 (Shiori no Nikki)
- Genre: Erotic romance
- Manga
- Written by: Tsuya Tsuya
- Published by: Nihon Bungeisha
- English publisher: NA: Seven Seas Entertainment
- Magazine: Manga Goraku Special
- Original run: February 15, 2019 – December 15, 2020
- Volumes: 3
- icon

Shiori's Diary (Japanese: しおりの日記, Hepburn: Shiori no Nikki) is a Japanese manga series written and illustrated by Tsuya Tsuya. It was serialized in Nihon Bungeisha's Manga Goraku Special magazine from February 2019 to December 2020.

== Publication ==
Written and illustrated by Tsuya Tsuya, Shiori's Diary was serialized in Nihon Bungeisha's Manga Goraku Special magazine from February 15, 2019, to December 15, 2020. Nihon Bungeisha collected its chapters in three tankōbon volumes, released from November 9, 2019, to January 29, 2021.

In North America, the manga was licensed for English release by Seven Seas Entertainment and released under its Ghost Ship mature imprint. The three volume were released from August 17, 2021, to April 26, 2022.

=== Volumes ===
No.	Original release date	Original ISBN	English release date	English ISBN
1	November 9, 2019	978-4-537-14161-0	August 17, 2021	978-1-947804-98-2
2	August 6, 2020	978-4-537-14270-9	November 30, 2021	978-1-64827-505-0
3	January 29, 2021	978-4-537-14335-5	April 26, 2022	978-1-63858-218-2

== See also ==
- Mikazuki ga Waratteru, another manga series by the same author
- Rakujitsu no Pathos, another manga series by the same author
- Futari no Ouchi, another manga series by the same author
