= Rakujitsu no Pathos =

Japanese manga series

- First tankōbon volume cover, featuring Makoto Nakaima

落日のパトス (Rakujitsu no Patosu)
- Genre: Romance
- Manga
- Written by: Tsuya Tsuya
- Published by: Akita Shoten
- Imprint: Young Champion Comics
- Magazine: Bessatsu Young Champion
- Original run: November 4, 2014 – present
- Volumes: 19
- Manga

Tasogare no Ethos
- Written by: Tsuya Tsuya
- Published by: Akita Shoten
- Imprint: Young Champion Comics
- Magazine: Young Champion Retsu
- Original run: November 19, 2019 – present
- Volumes: 5
- Manga

Akatsuki no Logos
- Written by: Tsuya Tsuya
- Published by: Akita Shoten
- Magazine: Young Champion Retsu
- Original run: August 18, 2026 – scheduled
- icon

Rakujitsu no Pathos (Japanese: 落日のパトス, Hepburn: Rakujitsu no Patosu; lit. 'Pathos of the Setting Sun') is a Japanese manga series written and illustrated by Tsuya Tsuya. It has been serialized in Akita Shoten's seinen manga magazine Bessatsu Young Champion since November 2014.

== Plot ==
In a quiet residential district of Tokyo, far from the city's bustling nightlife, Aki Fujiwara—an aspiring manga artist—lives a modest life. One day, his former high school teacher, Makoto Nakaima, moves into the neighboring apartment. The two are pleasantly surprised by the unexpected reunion. That night, however, Aki overhears unmistakable moans of sexual pleasure emanating from Makoto's room. Unable to suppress his curiosity, he peers inside and witnesses her having sex with her husband. This discovery marks the beginning of a clandestine relationship between the two, as their interactions grow increasingly intimate and transgress the boundaries of their former student-teacher dynamic.

== Publication ==
Written and illustrated by Tsuya Tsuya, Rakujitsu no Pathos started in Akita Shoten's seinen manga magazine Bessatsu Young Champion on November 4, 2014. Akita Shoten has collected its chapters into individual tankōbon volumes. The first volume was released on August 20, 2015. As of May 20, 2026, 19 volumes have been released.

A spin-off manga series, titled Tasogare no Ethos (黄昏のエトス, Tasogare no Etosu; lit. 'Ethos of Twilight'), started in Young Champion Retsu on November 19, 2019. Its first volume was released on June 19, 2020. As of November 20, 2025, five volumes have been released.

A second spin-off manga series, titled Akatsuki no Logos (暁のロゴス, Akatsuki no Rogosu; lit. 'Logos of the Dawn'), is set to start in Young Champion Retsu on August 18, 2026.

=== Volumes ===
==== Rakujitsu no Pathos ====
No.	Release date	ISBN
1	August 20, 2015	978-4-253-14071-3
2	April 20, 2016	978-4-253-14072-0
3	October 20, 2016	978-4-253-14073-7
4	June 20, 2017	978-4-253-14074-4
5	February 20, 2018	978-4-253-14075-1
6	August 20, 2018	978-4-253-14076-8
7	April 19, 2019	978-4-253-14077-5
8	November 20, 2019	978-4-253-14078-2
9	June 19, 2020	978-4-253-14079-9
10	February 19, 2021	978-4-253-14080-5
11	June 18, 2021	978-4-253-14215-1
12	March 17, 2022	978-4-253-14216-8
13	October 20, 2022	978-4-253-14217-5
14	May 18, 2023	978-4-253-14218-2
15	January 18, 2024	978-4-253-14219-9
16	August 20, 2024	978-4-253-14220-5
17	March 18, 2025	978-4-253-31401-5
18	November 20, 2025	978-4-253-00779-5
19	May 20, 2026	978-4-253-01362-8

==== Tasogare no Ethos ====
No.	Release date	ISBN
1	June 19, 2020	978-4-253-30141-1
2	November 18, 2021	978-4-253-30142-8
3	October 20, 2022	978-4-253-30143-5
4	April 18, 2024	978-4-253-30144-2
5	November 20, 2025	978-4-253-00869-3

== See also ==
- Mikazuki ga Waratteru, another manga series by the same author
- Futari no Ouchi, another manga series by the same author
- Shiori's Diary, another manga series by the same author
