= Mikazuki ga Waratteru =

Japanese manga series

- First tankōbon volume cover

三日月がわらってる (Mikazuki ga Waratteru)
- Genre: Romance
- Manga
- Written by: Tsuya Tsuya
- Published by: Akita Shoten
- Magazine: Young Champion Retsu
- Original run: March 16, 2010 – June 17, 2014
- Volumes: 5

Mikazuki ga Waratteru (三日月がわらってる; lit. 'The Crescent Moon is Smiling') is a Japanese manga series written and illustrated by Tsuya Tsuya. It was serialized in Akita Shoten's seinen manga magazine Young Champion Retsu from March 2010 to June 2014.

== Publication ==
Written and illustrated by Tsuya Tsuya, Mikazuki ga Waratteru was serialized in Akita Shoten's seinen manga magazine Young Champion Retsu from March 16, 2010, to June 17, 2014. Akita Shoten has collected its chapters in five tankōbon volumes, released from October 20, 2011, to June 20, 2014.

=== Volumes ===
No.	Release date	ISBN
1	October 20, 2011	978-4-253-25606-3
2	July 20, 2012	978-4-253-25607-0
3	March 19, 2013	978-4-253-25608-7
4	September 20, 2013	978-4-253-25609-4
5	June 20, 2014	978-4-253-25610-0

== See also ==
- Rakujitsu no Pathos, another manga series by the same author
- Futari no Ouchi, another manga series by the same author
- Shiori's Diary, another manga series by the same author
