= Yūji Shiozaki =

Japanese manga artist

- Born: September 7, 1967 (age 58)
- Occupation: Manga author
- Known for: Ikki Tousen

Yūji Shiozaki (塩崎 雄二, Shiozaki Yūji; born September 7, 1967) is a Japanese manga author. He is best known for the manga series Ikki Tousen, also known as Battle Vixens in English.

== Biography ==
Shiozaki made his debut in Shueisha's Young Jump. After creating several series for Shueisha, including Karen (1997–1998), Happy Man (1999), and Nikkan Tachibana (2000) in seinen magazines aimed at businessmen, he left Shueisha in 1998 to create Ikki Tousen for Wani Books. With the success of Ikki Tousen, he has since published a variety of series for different publishers, including a version of Zoids called Zoids ZI (2002–2003), Battle Club (2004), and Frontier Roots (2004). The most successful of these has been Battle Club, which is noted for its extensive fan service (such as a female-bodied character that is actually a man), but his main project remains Ikki Tousen. His newest series is Godeath - Megami no Ketsumyaku, which features more horror-like violence as well as fanservice.

His stated hobbies include baseball, traveling abroad, and vegetable gardening.
