= Shōnen Gahōsha =

Japanese publishing company

Shōnen Gahōsha Co., Ltd.

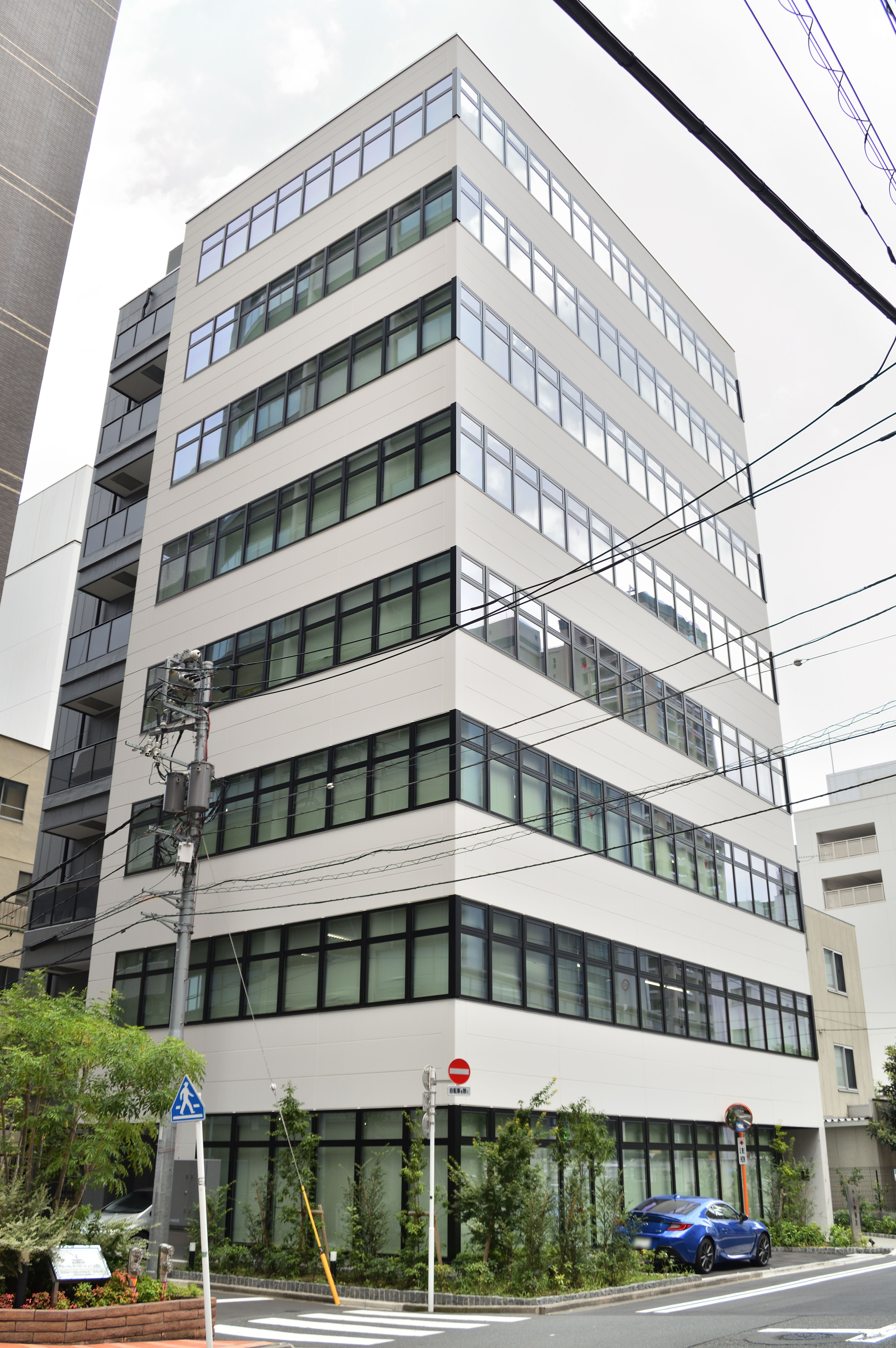
- Headquarters in Chiyoda, Tokyo
- Native name: 株式会社少年画報社
- Romanized name: Kabushiki-gaisha Shōnen Gahōsha
- Company type: KK
- Industry: Publishing
- Founded: October 1945; 80 years ago
- Founder: Isao Imai
- Headquarters: Kanda-Misakichō, Chiyoda, Tokyo, Japan
- Area served: Japan
- Products: Books, manga, magazines
- Brands: Young King; Young King OURs; Monthly Young King
- Number of employees: 40
- Website: www.shonengahosha.co.jp

Shōnen Gahōsha (株式会社少年画報社, Kabushiki-gaisha Shōnen Gahōsha) is a Japanese publisher named for Shōnen Gahō ("Boy's Illustrated News Magazine"), one of its first magazines.

== History ==
The company was founded in 1945. It previously published driving manuals and English conversation guides, but is now known for magazines such as the biweekly seinen manga Young King, and the monthly manga serials Young King OURs and Monthly Young King. Its longtime flagship weekly manga (later biweekly) for boys, Shōnen King (少年キング) (1963–1988), is now defunct.

Since 2024, the President of the Publisher is Saturo Imai.
