= List of Trigun chapters =

Cover of the first volume of Trigun (Shōnen Gahōsha edition) and the first volume of Trigun Maximum

Trigun is a Japanese manga series written and illustrated by Yasuhiro Nightow. It revolves around a man known as "Vash the Stampede" and two Bernardelli Insurance Society employees, Meryl Stryfe and Milly Thompson, who follow him around in order to minimize the damages inevitably caused by his appearance. Nightow, first published a one-shot of Trigun in Tokuma Shoten's shōnen manga magazine Monthly Shōnen Captain in February 1995; (Note: The one-shot was released in the March 1995 issue (cover date), released in February.) it began its regular serialization in the same magazine two months later in April. (Note: It started in the May 1995 issue (cover date), released in April.) Monthly Shōnen Captain ceased publication in January 1997, and the series was put on hiatus. Tokuma Shoten collected the Trigun chapters in three tankōbon volumes, released from April 25, 1996, to January 20, 1999; Shōnen Gahōsha republished the Trigun chapters in two volumes, released on June 2, 2000.

The manga resumed its publication in Shōnen Gahōsha's seinen manga magazine Young King OURs, under the title Trigun Maximum (トライガンマキシマム, Toraigan Makishimamu), in October 1997. Trigun Maximum finished in March 2007. Shōnen Gahōsha collected its chapters in fourteen tankōbon volumes, released from May 23, 1998, to February 27, 2008.

In North America, the manga was licensed by Dark Horse Comics, who announced its publication in June 2003; they released the two volumes of Trigun, based on the Shōnen Gahosha's edition, on October 15, 2003, and January 7, 2004. In March 2004, Dark Horse Comics announced that they would also publish Trigun Maximum; the fourteen volumes were released from May 26, 2004, to April 8, 2009. In September 2012, Dark Horse Comics announced that they would release the series in an omnibus edition; Trigun was released in a single volume on October 9, 2013; Trigun Maximum was released in five volumes from November 21, 2012, to November 5, 2014.

An anthology manga titled Trigun: Multiple Bullets, featuring short stories written by several manga artists such as Boichi, Masakazu Ishiguru, Satoshi Mizukami, Ark Performance, Yusuke Takeyama, Yuga Takauchi, and Akira Sagami, was released by Shōnen Gahosha in Japan on December 28, 2011. The volume was released by Dark Horse Comics on March 6, 2013.

== Volumes ==
=== Trigun ===
==== Original release ====
No.	Release date	ISBN
1	April 25, 1996	4-19-830127-1
00. "High Noon at July"; 01. "The 60,000,000,000.00$$ Man" (600億$$の男, Roppyaku-oku Dabudoru no Otoko); 02. "Looney Tunes"; 03. "Hard Puncher"; 04. "Popo" (ポポ); 05. "Assault" (強襲, Kyōshū); 06. "Die Hards"; 07. "Rem" (レム, Remu)
2	October 30, 1996	4-19-830144-1
08. "Duelist" (デュエリスト); 09. "And Between Field and Sky" (そして荒野と空の間を, Soshite Kōya to Sora no Aida o); 10. "Little Arcadia" (リトル・アルカディア, Ritoru Arukadia); 11. "Son" (息子, Musuko); 12. "River of Life" (命の川, Inochi no Kawa); 13. "Blood and Thunder"
3	January 20, 1999	4-19-830185-9
14. "Diablo"; 15. "Fragile" (フラジャイル, Furajairu); 16. "Scar" (傷痕, Kizuato); 17. "Slaughter Cafe"; 18. "Demon Squad" (魔神集結す, Majin Shūketsusu); 19. "Invisible Eye" (不可視の隻眼, Fukashi no Sekigan); 20. "Fifth Moon" (フィフス・ムーン, Fifusu Mūn)

==== Reprint ====
No.	Original release date	Original ISBN	English release date	English ISBN
1	June 2, 2000	4-7859-2005-X	October 15, 2003	1-59307-052-7
00. "High Noon"; 01. "The $$60 Billion Double Dollar Man"; 02. "Looney Tunes"; 03. "Hard Puncher"; 04. "Popo"; 05. "Assault"; 06. "Die Hards"; 07. "Rem"; 08. "Duelist"; 09. "Then, Between the Wasteland and Sky"; 10. "Little Arcadia"; 11. "Son"; 12. "River of Life"
In the city of Orleans on the planet No Man's Land, gunman Vash the Stampede frightens off criminals who attack a restaurant with a toy gun. However, his reputation as the outlaw "The Humanoid Typhoon" causes citizens to turn on him for the $60 billion bounty on his head. Vash is forced to escape and defeat the escaped outlaws, Professor and Goosef Nebraska, who were hired to capture him. Meanwhile, Meryl Stryfe and Milly Thompson, two agents of the Bernardelli Insurance Society, claim that the bounty has been canceled. Vash offers the money to the civilians anyway and decides to wander until he finds a certain man. He leaves on a sand steamer, where he meets a child named Kite, who is helping the ruthless Bad Lad Gang hijack the vehicle. Kite changes his mind, however, when he realizes the danger it could cause, and Vash decides to help him protect the place. Vash battles the leader, Neon, while Kite fixes the vehicle. After his victory, Vash reveals himself to be another "Plant" to protect the area. Afterwards, Vash, Meryl, and Milly meet a family trying to stop the ruthless tycoon Morgan from evicting them. Morgan has hired a gang of thugs, including the couple's son, Badwick, and Patricia Nebraska and the rest of the Nebraska family, to take the land. With help from Vash, Meryl and Milly foil the thugs. Badwick understands his parents' determination to hold on to their livelihood, but he is surprised when they reveal their plan to give it to him.
2	June 2, 2000	4-7859-2006-8	January 7, 2004	1-59307-053-5
13. "Blood and Thunder"; 14. "Diablo"; 15. "Fragile"; 16. "Scars"; 17. "Slaughter Cafe"; 18. "Gathering of the Devils"; 19. "Eye of Invisibility"; 20. "Fifth Moon"; Extra: "Day In Day Out"; Extra: "Trigun Pilot"
Vash crosses paths with Legato Bluesummers, who claims that the twelve Gung-Ho Guns will attack and turn Vash's life into hell. The first enemy is Monev the Gale, who takes down Vash's prosthetic arm. However, Monev spares Vash because Vash's pacifism, taught by his late caretaker Rem Saverem, would be ruined otherwise. However, Monev is killed by the second member, E.G. Mine, as punishment. This angers Vash, who easily defeats Mine. Afterward, Vash rescues the young priest Nicholas D. Wolfwood, who is connected to the Gung-ho Guns but does not harm anyone. Instead, Wolfwood befriends Vash, Meryl, and Milly, then leaves. Vash is then challenged to a one-on-one fight by Dominique the Cyclops, and Vash once again remains victorious and spares Dominique. While Vash rests, his brother, Million Knives, who caused Rem's death, wakes up from a long slumber. Vash orders his friends to escape the area. Knives confronts Vash and forces him to mutate his gun-like Angel Arm to test the Plant's power. Vash loses control of the Angel Arm and shoots part of the moon. Everyone involved in the fight disappears in the aftermath. The volume ends with a Trigun prototype, in which Vash stops a hostage situation without killing anyone.

=== Trigun Maximum ===
Published by Shōnen Gahōsha, translated by Dark Horse Comics.

No.	Title	Original release date	English release date
1	Hero Returns	May 23, 1998; 4-7859-1842-X	May 26, 2004; 1-59307-196-5
01. "Hero Reborn"; 02. "Lina" (リィナ, Rina); 03. "Bravo, Girls!" (ガールズ・ブラボー！, Gāruzu Burabō); 04. "Hero Returns"; 05. "Dancing Revolver"; 06. "Sin" (罪, Tsumi)
Two years after Knives mutated Vash's arm, Wolfwood travels from city to city until he finds that Vash has been adopted by an elder who calls him Eric. After teaming up with Wolfwood to rescue a friend from a man impersonating Vash, he decides to leave his adoptive family to continue his journey to find Knives. As they travel, Vash meets old friends who are hiding in a shelter. They give him clothing reminiscent of his life as a gunslinger. However, Wolfwood criticizes Vash's pacifist morals, believing it is impossible to avoid bloodshed in every fight. Nevertheless, Vash remains true to his morals and stops a man from killing a criminal who killed one of his family members.
2	Death Blue	December 18, 1998; 4-7859-1888-8	August 18, 2004; 1-59307-197-3
07. "Return of the Blue Wing of Death" (死を運ぶ 蒼き風 再び, Shi o Hakobu Aokikaze Futatabi); 08. "Resume our Business"; 09. "Samurai Showdown" (サムライショウダウン, Samurai Shoudaun); 10. "Wolfwood" (ウルフウッド, Urufuddo); 11. "Desperado"; 12. "Home Sweet Home" (ホーム・スィート・ホーム, Hōmu Su~īto Hōmu); 13. "Darkness" (暗闇, Kurayami)
Legato locates Vash and sends Gung-Ho Guns member Rai-Dei the Blade to fight him. Despite being reluctant to fight, Vash accepts the match on the condition that, if he wins, Rai-Dei will stop killing enemies. When Vash wins the battle, Rai-Dei's shock causes Wolfwood to kill him, believing he was going to attack again. However, Vash feels horrified about this, claiming there was no need for murder; whether or not Rai-Dei would keep fighting, he would have just run away. This causes another clash between Vash's and Wolfwood's philosophies. As they keep traveling, Vash's body reaches its limits, resulting in the two resting in an inn. There, the owner goes to rescue his hostage wife all alone, resulting in Vash freeing his tied up son and going with him to rescue the hostage. As they return to the inn, a criminal tries to kill the group, but they are saved by Wolfwood. Vash decides to visit a spaceship filled with people he has been friends with for several years, but is shocked when they turn out to be puppets from Leonof, the Puppet-Master from Legato's group. This enrages Vash, who attacks Leonof.
3	His Life As A...	October 27, 1999; 4-7859-1948-5	October 20, 2004; 1-59307-266-X
14. "Reservoir Dogs" (レザボア・ドッグス, Rezaboa Doggusu); 15. "Cement" (セメント, Semento); 16. "No Escape"; 17. "Emilio the Player" (エミリオ・ザ・プレイヤー, Emiro za Pureiyā); 18. "Long Goodbye"; 19. "Families" (ファミリーズ); 20. "His Life as a..."
Vash and Wolfwood fight Leonof, who attacks them with an army of puppets. After a long battle, Brad, Meryl, and Milly arrive to help the duo defeat Leonof. They suffer multiple wounds, however, and are rescued by others hiding in the ship who were awaiting Vash. While Vash rests, Wolfwood sees a picture of younger people with an identical Vash and believes that Vash is immortal. The civilians, however, claim that Vash is not attached to the idea of immortality, as evidenced by the multiple wounds on his body that never healed.
4	Bottom of the Dark	July 27, 2000; 4-7859-2012-2	February 23, 2005; 1-59307-314-3
21. "Countdown"; 22. "Bluesy Killer Horn" (ブルージィ キラー ホーン, Burūji~i Kirā Hōn); 23. "Bottom of the Dark"; 24. "Den of Thieves" (魔窟, Makutsu); 25. "Crying Wild Bullet" (クライング ウイルド ブリッド, Kuraingu Uirudo Buriddo); 26. "Those Who Stood Idly By" (かたわらに たたずむ ものたち, Katawarani Tatazumu Monotachi); 27. "Doomed Sinner" (絶望の罪人, Zetsubou no Zainin)
After leaving the spaceship, Vash and Wolfwood continue their journey. Meanwhile, an enraged Knives orders his Gung-Ho Guns to continue attacking Vash, claiming that one of them is secretly aiding Vash. Meanwhile, Zazie the Beast kidnaps Meryl, prompting Milly to beg Vash and Wolfwood to let her join their cause and help save her coworker. The trio is attacked by the Gung-Ho Guns, with Midvalley the Hornfreak fearing a traitor. Vash allows Hoppered the Gauntlet to defeat him in the hopes that he will be taken directly to Knives, who seeks revenge for the destruction of July caused by Vash's Angel Arm.
5	Break Out	February 24, 2001; 4-7859-2066-1	May 11, 2005; 1-59307-344-5
28. "The City And Then The Banquet of Dogs" (街 そして犬共の宴, Machi Soshite Inudomo no Utage); 29. "Breakout" (ブレイクアウト, Bureikuauto); 30. "Loss" (喪失, Sōshitsu); 31. "Villain" (凶人, Kyoujin); 32. "Death Deal" (デス ディール, Desu Dīru); 33. "Let Us Walk the Path to Redemption" (せめて歩ませよ我が購いの道を, Semete Ayumaseyo Waga Aganai no Michi o)
6	The Gunslinger	October 5, 2001; 4-7859-2128-5	August 3, 2005; 1-59307-351-8
34. "The Gunslinger" (ザ·ガンスリンガー, Za Gansuringā); 35. "double team"; 36. "Cross X Assassins" (クロスXアサシンズ, Kurosu X Asashinzu); 37. "Death Omen" (死兆, Shichō); 38. "Colorless Expression" (色無き相貌, Ironaki Sōbō); 39. "Seeds Voyaging to the Stars, A World Inside a Pod" (星を往く種子 莢の中の世界, Hoshi o Yuku Shushi Saya no Naka no Sekai)
7	Happy Days	August 7, 2002; 4-7859-2217-6	November 2, 2005; 1-59307-395-X
40. "Happy Days."; 41. "Separate Ways" (セパレイトウェイズ, Separeito Uizu); 42. "The King of Loneliness" (孤独の王, Kodoku no Ō); 43. "Good For Nothing and the Blues" (ろくでなしとブルース, Rokudenashi to Burūsu); 44. "When They Arrived, It Was Already the Beginning of the End" (辿り着けばそこはすでに終わりの始まり, Tadoritsukeba Sokowa Sudeni Owari no Hajimari); 45. "Conflict" (コンフリクト, Konfurikuto)
8	Silent Ruin	April 25, 2003; 4-7859-2306-7	February 1, 2006; 1-59307-452-2
46. "Invasion" (侵攻, Shinkou); 47. "Silent Ruin"; 48. "Counter-Attack!! (カウンターアタック！！, Kauntā Atakku); 49. "Escape" (脱出, Dasshutsu); 50. "Separate Paths" (それぞれの道, Sorezore no Michi); 51. "Wolfwood Spin Off – Freed Bird" ([外伝] FREED BIRD, Gaiden Furīdo Bādo)
9	LR	October 24, 2003; 4-7859-2369-5	July 26, 2006; 1-59307-527-8
52. "Home"; 53. "Gale"; 54. "LR"; 55. "Battle to the Death"; 56. "Prostrate Demon"; 57. "Fortitude"
10	Wolfwood	December 27, 2004; 4-7859-2497-7	November 8, 2006; 1-59307-556-1
58. "Reckless Conduct"; 59. "Sworn Friend"; 60. "Sudden Change"; 61. "Death Omen"; 62. "Final Battle"; 63. "Homecoming"; 64. "Wolfwood"; 65. "Final Farewell"
11	Zero Hour	December 27, 2004; 4-7859-2498-5	January 17, 2007; 1-59307-674-6
66. "Zero Hour"; 67. "Slap Sticks Days"; 68. "Thunderstruck"; 69. "Return of the Wicked"; 70. "Get Ready, Get Set"; 71. "Someone to Defend"
12	The Gunslinger	July 2, 2006; 4-7859-2665-1	January 16, 2008; 1-59307-881-1
72. "The Journey Ends – But Heavy Breathing Still Echoes"; 73. "Corrosive Thunder"; 74. "The Interceptor"; 75. "The Gunslinger"; 76. "+ - 0"; 77. "Resonance"; 78. "Run Livio Run"; 79. "Lantern"; 80. "Their Own World"
13	Double Duel	November 9, 2007; 4-7859-2884-0	December 1, 2008; 1-59582-167-8
81. "False Doppleganger"; 82. "Double Duel"; 83. "Demon Fire"; 84. "Black"; 85. "Battle of the Mystics"; 86. "Tag in a Person"; 87. "Catch-as-catch-can"; 88. "Apex Wings" (尖翼); 89. "VS"
14	Mind Games	February 27, 2008; 4-7859-2923-5	April 8, 2009; 1-59582-262-3
90. "When Conflict Comes to an End" (相克果つる刻, Sōkoku Hatsuru Toki); 91. "Overkill"; 92. "Side by Side" (サイド・バイ・サイド); 93. "Never Give Up! Never Surrender!"; 94. "Ticket to the Future" (未来への切符, Mirai e no Kippu); 95. "Mind Games"; 96. "Double Wings" (双翼, Sōyoku); 97. "Never Ending Song"
