= Young King OURs =

Japanese manga magazine

- Cover of Oct. 2009 issue of Young King OURs
- Editor: Yoshiyuki Fudetani
- Categories: Seinen manga
- Frequency: Monthly
- Circulation: 68,000 (2008)
- Company: Shōnen Gahōsha
- Country: Japan
- Based in: Tokyo
- Language: Japanese
- Website: Official website

Young King OURs (Japanese: ヤングキングアワーズ, Hepburn: Yangu Kingu Awāzu) is a monthly manga magazine published in Japan by Shōnen Gahōsha, aimed primarily at male audiences, mostly older teens and young adults. It is the sister publication of Young King (which in turn was the sister publication of the now-discontinued Shōnen King). As of 2008, the circulation of Young King OURs was 68,000 copies.

== Manga artists and series featured in Young King OURs ==
- Yuki Hijiri
  - Locke the Superman
- Gaku Miyao
  - Devil Hunter Yohko
  - Kazan
- Kouta Hirano
  - Hellsing
  - Drifters (ongoing)
- Masakazu Ishiguro
  - And Yet the Town Moves
- Akihiro Ito
  - Geobreeders
- Ark Performance
  - Arpeggio of Blue Steel (ongoing)
- Ruri Miyahara
  - The Kawai Complex Guide to Manors and Hostel Behavior
- Yasuhiro Nightow
  - Trigun (originally published in Shōnen Captain)
- Rikdo Koshi
  - Excel Saga
- Hajime Yamamura
  - Kamunagara
  - Ten ni Hibiki
- Satoshi Mizukami
  - Lucifer and the Biscuit Hammer
  - Planet With
  - Spirit Circle
  - Climax Necromance (ongoing, art by Ichiri Seto)
- Masahiro Shibata
  - Sarai
- Satoshi Shiki
  - I – Daphne in the Brilliant Blue
- Hiroki Ukawa
  - Shrine of the Morning Mist
  - Ayakashi no Yoru Ie
- Shutaro Yamada
  - Loan Wolf
- Daisuke Moriyama
  - World Embryo
- Isutoshi
  - Aiki
- Shiro
  - Can I Take Your Photo? (ongoing)
- Hiroki Miyashita
  - Me and the Alien MuMu (ongoing)
- Harumi Fujino and Shuu Katayama
  - How to Look for Something Lost
- Dr.Poro and Nabana Naba
  - The Vermilion Mask (ongoing)
