= Can I Take Your Photo? =

Japanese manga series

- First tankōbon volume cover

カメラ、はじめてもいいですか? (Kamera, Hajimete mo Ii desu ka?)
- Genre: Coming-of-age; Slice of life
- Manga
- Written by: Shiro
- Published by: Shōnen Gahōsha
- English publisher: NA: Orange Inc.
- Imprint: Young King Comics
- Magazine: Young King OURs (August 30, 2019 – April 30, 2026); Young King (June 22, 2026 – present)
- Original run: August 30, 2019 – present
- Volumes: 8
- Television drama
- Directed by: Naho Kamimura; Shinpei Yamazaki; Atsushi Ueda; Tatsurō Yamashiro
- Written by: Naho Kamimura
- Original network: BS Shochiku Tokyu
- Original run: July 3, 2023 – September 18, 2023
- Episodes: 12
- icon

Can I Take Your Photo? (Japanese: カメラ、はじめてもいいですか?, Hepburn: Kamera, Hajimete mo Ii desu ka?; lit. 'Can I Start Using a Camera?') is a Japanese manga series written and illustrated by Shiro. It was serialized in Shōnen Gahōsha's seinen manga magazine Young King OURs from August 2019 to April 2026 and resumed in the publisher's Young King magazine in June 2026. A 12-episode television drama adaptation was broadcast from July to September 2023.

== Synopsis ==
Mito Ikeda is a timid high school student with no self-confidence. When she gets into the field of photography, she gradually develops confidence with it.

== Media ==
=== Manga ===
Written and illustrated by Shiro, Can I Take Your Photo? started in Shōnen Gahōsha's seinen manga magazine Young King OURs on August 30, 2019. The series finished in the magazine on April 30, 2026, and resumed in Young King on June 22 of the same year. Shōnen Gahōsha has collected its chapters into individual tankōbon volumes. The first volume was released on July 30, 2020. As of April 27, 2026, eight volumes have been released.

The manga is licensed digitally in English by Orange Inc.

==== Volumes ====
No.	Original release date	Original ISBN	English release date	English ISBN
1	July 30, 2020	978-4-7859-6720-8	September 3, 2024	979-8-8949-5016-7
2	May 1, 2021	978-4-7859-6899-1	September 6, 2024 (Note: Based on the source code of the website.)	979-8-8949-5028-0
3	January 28, 2022	978-4-7859-7072-7	October 25, 2024	979-8-8949-5050-1
4	September 30, 2022	978-4-7859-7242-4	January 31, 2025	979-8-8949-5101-0
5	September 4, 2023	978-4-7859-7477-0	2025	979-8-8949-5167-6
6	July 30, 2024	978-4-7859-7723-8	—	—
7	August 8, 2025	978-4-7859-7996-6	—	—
8	April 27, 2026	978-4-7859-8177-8	—	—

=== Drama ===
A 12-episode television drama adaptation was broadcast on BS Shochiku Tokyu from July 3 to September 18, 2023. It stars Sora Tamaki as Mito Ikeda.

== See also ==
- Encouragement of Climb, another manga series by the same author
