= Kamisama Dolls =

Japanese manga series

- Cover of the first manga volume

神様ドォルズ (Kamisama Dooruzu)
- Genre: Action; Supernatural thriller
- Manga
- Written by: Hajime Yamamura
- Published by: Shogakukan
- Magazine: Monthly Sunday Gene-X
- Original run: December 19, 2006 – February 19, 2013
- Volumes: 12
- Anime television series
- Directed by: Seiji Kishi
- Produced by: Junya Okamoto; Masazumi Katō; Yoshikazu Kuretani
- Written by: Makoto Uezu
- Music by: Chiaki Ishikawa; Masara Nishida
- Studio: Brain's Base
- Licensed by: AUS: Madman Entertainment; NA: Sentai Filmworks; UK: MVM Films
- Original network: TV Tokyo, TVA, TVO, AT-X
- English network: SEA: Aniplus Asia; US: Anime Network
- Original run: July 6, 2011 – September 28, 2011
- Episodes: 13

Kamisama Dolls (Japanese: 神様ドォルズ, Hepburn: Kamisama Dooruzu; "God Dolls") is a Japanese manga series written and illustrated by Hajime Yamamura. It was serialized in Shogakukan's seinen manga magazine Monthly Sunday Gene-X from December 2006 to February 2013, with its chapters collected in twelve tankōbon volumes. An anime adaptation aired from July to September 2011.

== Plot ==
Kyōhei, a university student, has moved to Tokyo from his old village to try to forget his unpleasant memories of certain events. One evening he goes on a group date with his friends, including his old neighbor and fellow student, Hibino. Later that night, he and Hibino discover a dead, bloody body in an elevator. Unexpectedly, his younger sister, Utao, arrives at his apartment with her kakashi (an ancient wooden "god" controlled by the mind) that was once his kakashi, and tells him that his former friend Aki and his own kakashi are responsible. After their encounter with Aki, Hibino learns that her father is from "Karakami" village, the same village as Kyōhei, Aki and Utao and the origin of the kakashi. She later accompanies them to "Karakami" village, and finds out many things about the village and the kakashi, as well as Kyōhei, Aki, and Utao.

== Characters ==
Kyōhei Kuga (枸雅 匡平, Kuga Kyōhei)
Voiced by: Nobuhiko Okamoto (Japanese); Leraldo Anzaldua (English)
Kyōhei comes from the wealthy Kuga family, who has left his hometown and his duties as a "Seki" to live his own life in Tokyo. He was the partner of the doll, Kukuri, before it was entrusted to his younger sister, Utao. Late in the anime it is revealed that Kyōhei is the strongest Seki ever, with much greater power than any Seki before: he is able to "open" Kukuri's left hand, which has the power to absorb, amplify and reflect energy beams, something that no other Seki has been able to do in over a millennium.
Utao Kuga (枸雅 詩緒, Kuga Utao)
Voiced by: Misato Fukuen (Japanese); Hilary Haag (English)
Utao is Kyōhei's younger sister and the current partner of Kukuri. She comes to Tokyo out of concern that Aki would come for her brother. Her fears are confirmed and, after destroying Kyōhei's apartment in a confrontation with Aki, she moves into Hibino's house with her brother. She starts working at the Shiba family's café to help defray their living expenses and also begins training to improve her control over Kukuri's movements. She seems to have a brother complex towards Kyohei to the point of becoming angry with any other girl who approaches him.
Hibino Shiba (史場 日々乃, Shiba Hibino)
Voiced by: Ai Kayano (Japanese); Monica Rial (English)
Hibino is a beautiful young woman who attends the same university as Kyōhei, who has had a crush on her since they met, but is unaware of her own feelings for him. She has been asked out on dates by many of her male classmates, but declined all of them. She eventually becomes Kyōhei's girlfriend. Despite her father coming from the same village as Kyōhei's family, she is unaware of its secrets until she invites Kyōhei and Utao (whose apartment was destroyed) to live with her and her father. According to Aki, Kyōhei's affection for her comes from Hibino's resemblance with a certain teacher from their childhood.
Aki Kuga (枸雅 阿幾, Kuga Aki)
Voiced by: Ryohei Kimura (Japanese); David Matranga (English)
A former childhood friend of Kyōhei's and another Seki, who was imprisoned several years before the beginning of the storyline after he had used his kakushi, Kuremitsuha, to kill in anger over the death of their teacher with whom he had a romantic relationship. He escapes from confinement after learning that Kyōhei has left the village and sets out for Tokyo to confront him, claiming that both of them are guilty of the same "sin" and that Kyōhei cannot live his life in denial.
Kōshirō Hyūga (日向 勾司朗, Hyūga Kōshirō)
Voiced by: Katsuki Murase (Japanese); Adam Gibbs (English)
A Seki from the Hyūga family. He is the partner of the kakushi, Uwazutsu. He and Kirio are tasked with capturing Aki and bringing him back to the village. He is shown to be protective of Kirio and acts as a father figure to him, as Kirio was separated from his birth family and the head of the Hyūga clan treats him harshly. He also seems to care for Utao and Kyōhei as shown in Episode 12, even though they are from the rival Kuga clan.
Kirio Hyūga (日向 桐生, Hyūga Kirio)
Voiced by: Yumiko Kobayashi (Japanese); Luci Christian (English)
Kirio is another Seki who controls the doll, Takemikazuchi. He is actually Utao's younger twin brother who was separated from his family at birth and taken into the Hyūga family's custody in secret. Like his sister, it is said that his ability as a Seki was awakened while he still was in their mother's womb, thus attracting the attention of the Hyūga clan who were looking for a suitable Seki to control their hidden, and most powerful, kakushi, Amaterasu.
Mahiru Hyūga (日向 まひる, Hyūga Mahiru)
Voiced by: Kana Hanazawa (Japanese); Genevieve Simmons (English)
The most powerful Seki from the Hyūga family who considers all other Seki, except for Kyōhei, inferior to herself. The reason for this is that when she was a child Kyōhei saved her life by unleashing Kukuri's true power. Since then she has developed an obsessive infatuation for him. She is Kōshirō's cousin and excels in controlling her doll, Magatsuhi, whose special ability is to stop other dolls' movements. Mahiru was unable to retain control of her Doll after it was severely damaged by Kukuri and it went berserk and started using powers that Mahiru had not seen before. Her Doll was then destroyed by Kukuri.
Kūko Karahari (空張 久羽子, Karahari Kūko)
Voiced by: Miyuki Sawashiro (Japanese); Maggie Flecknoe (English)
Kyohei and Hibino's eccentric classmate. She is fed up with normalcy and is interested in the supernatural. She was close to giving up because all her leads turned out to be shams but was overjoyed when she discovered the kakashi and forcibly involved herself in the situation. She kidnaps Aki, who later decides to hide out in her apartment.

== Media ==
=== Manga ===
Written and illustrated by Hajime Yamamura, Kamisama Dolls was serialized in Shogakukan's seinen manga magazine Monthly Sunday Gene-X from December 19, 2006, to February 19, 2013. Shogakukan collected its chapters in twelve tankōbon volumes, released from July 19, 2007, to April 19, 2013.

=== Anime ===
Three theme songs are used in the anime: "Fukanzen Nenshou" (不完全燃焼; lit. 'Incomplete Combustion') for the opening theme; "Switch ga Haittara" (スイッチが入ったら; lit. 'When the Switch Is Flipped') for the main ending theme, and "Natsu no Niwa" (夏の庭; lit. 'Summer Garden') for Episode 7's ending theme. All three songs are performed by Chiaki Ishikawa.

==== Episodes ====
No.	Title	Original release date
1	"A God Arrives"; Transliteration: "Kami wa Kitarite" (Japanese: 神は来たりて)	July 6, 2011
As Kyōhei Kuga tries to live the life of a university student, his younger sister Utao Kuga comes to the city with Kukuri, her kakashi. Her reason for coming is that his friend Aki Kuga has escaped their village's prison and she wants to protect him. Soon after, Aki arrives with Kuramitsuha, his kakashi, and the confrontation with Utao causes serious damage to Kyōhei's apartment. Because of this, Kyōhei and Utao come to live with Hibino Shiba and her father, who came from the same village as Kyōhei. When Hibino's father says it is some sort of support from their village's shrine, Kyōhei begins to understand that he can never run away from his past.
2	"A God's Training"; Transliteration: "Kamisama no Tokkun" (Japanese: 神様の特訓)	July 13, 2011
While Utao trains to improve her handling of Kukuri, an explosion occurs near the training site. It turns out to be a university storage room that was being used illegally as the clubhouse of an about-to-be-abolished club led by Kūko Karahari, the daughter of a detective who is investigating the death of the person that Kyōhei and Hibino found in the elevator previously. Kūko happens to see Kukuri in action as Utao use the doll to rescue her and her one remaining assistant. As a result, Kukuri and other kamisama dolls become the subject Kūko's new investigation causing Kyōhei to become concerned for Utao.
3	"It Attacks..."; Transliteration: "Seme Kitaru wa..." (Japanese: 攻め来たるは…)	July 20, 2011
Suo, Hibino's friend, comes by the restaurant where she meets Utao as she works a waitress. Suo pokes fun at Utao for eating cake all the time, to the point that she may have gained weight. Hibino, taking Utao to a park, contacts Kyōhei to meet them there. Kyōhei, however, chances upon Aki, who is displeased that Kyōhei left the village and wants him to return. Luckily, Kōshirō Hyūga appears with Uwazutsu, his kakashi, and his attack drives Aki away. Elsewhere, a truck loses control, drives off of a freeway overpass, and falls towards Hibino and Utao, who uses Kukuri to protect them from being crushed. Kōshirō and Aki continue the battle between their kakashi. An avid Kūko has seen the fight from afar and is hurrying to the scene to investigate.
4	"Heruma"; Transliteration: "Heruma" (Japanese: ヘルマ)	July 27, 2011
Aki figures out that Kōshirō's kakashi has been following his movements by his odor and he manages to get away. As Aki is about to attack Kōshirō, an unknown Seki attacks him unexpectedly and knocks him off of the building. Aki happens to land in front of Kūko, who, elated by this unexpected windfall, drags the injured Aki to her apartment where she interrogates him through torture about the existence of kakashi. Kyōhei, Hibino, and Utao go to see Kūko, only to learn of Aki's presence. Aki falls off the balcony into the bushes to escape, and Kyōhei goes out to search for him. Hibino catches up to Kyōhei to bandage his hand for punching a concrete wall out of anger. Utao encounters Kirio Hyūga with Takemikazuchi, his kakashi, who reveals that he is her twin brother who was separated at birth.
5	"To Home..."; Transliteration: "Kokyō e..." (Japanese: 故郷へ…)	August 3, 2011
Utao and Kirio enter a heated battle in the city using their respective kakashi, and many citizens catch sight of this. When Kukuri is seriously injured by Takemikazuchi's electricity attack, it hides in the forest nearby. However, when Takemikazuchi attempts to attack again, Kukuri absorbs the shock and repels it, destroying Takemikazuchi. Kōshirō arrives to take Kirio back to the village. Kyōhei later informs Hibino that he and Utao must return to the village to repair Kukuri. She insists on accompanying them, and drives them to the mountain village. On returning home, Kirio is punished by Sahei Hyūga, the clan elder, for his reckless acts, and Kōshirō prevents Sahei from stabbing Kirio to death. It is later shown that Sahei has a dormant kakashi buried under the Hyūga shrine.
6	"Karakami Village"; Transliteration: "Karakami Mura" (Japanese: 空守村)	August 10, 2011
Kyōhei, Hibino, and Utao meet up with Moyako Somaki, who helps her grandfather to repair and maintain kakashi. She tells Hibino some of the secrets of how kakashi are constructed. Utao goes to see Kiyotaka Kuga, her grandfather, who confirms that Kirio is indeed her younger twin brother. After Kukuri is repaired, Utao trains with Moyako for a while before they go on a picnic. Utao comes up with the idea that Kukuri should fly her, along with Kyōhei and Hibino, as a way to go back home, but she loses concentration and causes an unstable and uncomfortable flight, prompting her to safely lower Kukuri onto the ground. Taking shelter from a downpour at the shrine, Kyōhei is reminded of the sensei who taught at his school six years previously.
7	"Portrait of Memories"; Transliteration: "Tsuioku no Shōzō" (Japanese: 追憶の肖像)	August 17, 2011
Six years previously, Chihaya Senō arrives at the village where she will be the new teacher at the village. Senō is harassed by Atsushi Kuga, a bully at the school, and the principal gives her a warning for slapping Atsushi. It turns out that Atsushi is a Seki and regarded as near-royalty by the townsfolk and, therefore, his boorish behaviour is overlooked, even though he is barely able to control his kakushi. To get back at Senō he has started false rumours about her, ruining her reputation in the village. She plans to resign from her post, but, after a brief encounter with Aki, she decides to return to school and continue her work; the rumors become worse. When Atsushi attempts to seduce Senō a second time, Aki intervenes and takes her to his house where they later make love. Unfortunately, she is forced to leave the school after evidence of their encounter is made public. Atsushi takes Senō captive and Aki arrives to save her. When Atsushi attacks Aki with Kuramitsuha, Senō jumps in front of him and is killed. This causes Aki to go berserk, wrest control of Kuramitsuha from Atsushi and slaughter him and his friends in vengeance. Aki is eventually overwhelmed by other Seki and is sent to prison.
8	"The Role of a God"; Transliteration: "Kamisama no Yakuwari" (Japanese: 神様の役割)	August 24, 2011
After they return from the mountains Kyōhei, Hibino, and Utao go the beach, but a typhoon interrupts their agenda. To make matters worse, the inn experiences a power outage, not to mention numerous leaks from the ceiling. Kyōhei and Hibino attempt to make repairs and Utao uses Kukuri to assist them. On returning to the city, Hibino goes to return books to the library, and, because she forgot one of them, Utao goes out to catch up to her. Hibino encounters Aki at the library, and he questions her relationship with Kyōhei. Utao finds Hibino and challenges Aki to a duel at the park with their kakashi. When Utao tells Aki that kakashi are meant to save rather than destroy, Aki cuts the match short and departs. As the girls return home very upset, Kyōhei tells a worried Utao that kakashi actually have human hearts.
9	"Tangled Relations"; Transliteration: "Innen no Uzu" (Japanese: 因縁の渦)	August 31, 2011
Moyako comes to the city and tells Utao about Kukuri's left hand and the power it contains. She also mentions that she is still working on repairing Takemikazuchi. Moyako later takes a walk with Kyōhei, and the two discuss Aki's whereabouts and Kirio's presence. Kūko, who has been housing Aki for quite some time, has researched Karakami Village and what happened six years previously, but she does not know how Aki fits into the picture. Kyōhei has great concerns about Kirio being in the care of Kōshirō, not knowing why they have come to live in the city in the first place. He himself wonders if he has changed since he came to the city six months previously. Kirio later goes to see Utao and tells her that he will stop fighting her from now on.
10	"The Princess Arrives"; Transliteration: "Miki, Ryōran" (Japanese: 美姫、繚乱)	September 7, 2011
A Seki named Mahiru Hyūga suddenly appears with Magatsuhi, her kakashi, and she seems to be head-over-heels for Kyōhei. She becomes furious when the others there tell her to leave and she uses Magatsuhi against them. Elsewhere, Kūko takes Aki to see Takeshi Hirashiro, who was responsible for releasing him from prison. Out of nowhere, Mahiru breaks into the office and realizes that Hirashiro was soliciting Aki along with her. Mahiru defeats Aki by paralyzing Kuramitsuha, and she pins Kūko down on the floor using a Taser. It is revealed that eight years previously, Kyōhei and Aki, along with Mahiru who followed them, found a cave in a forest by the village. They discover a kakashi, later recognized as Amaterasu, covered in glowing green moss. Amaterasu awakens and chases them outside the cave, and the three combine their efforts to take on Amaterasu, who has the ability to control one's mind. Kyōhei saves Aki and Mahiru from Amaterasu by using Kukuri's left hand to repel its attack.
11	"Hibino Kidnapped"; Transliteration: "Toraware no Hibino" (Japanese: 囚われの日々乃)	September 14, 2011
Aki tells Mahiru, who has been in love with Kyōhei since he saved her during the Amaterasu incident, that Kyōhei is in a relationship with Hibino. Later that day, Moyako goes shopping with Hibino, but, when Moyako runs off to use the restroom, an envious Mahiru abducts Hibino and questions her about Kyōhei. She then drops by the restaurant to see Kyōhei, who, along with Utao and Hibino's father, is very worried for Hibino. Mahiru storms out when Kyōhei rejects her plea to return to the village with her. During this time, Fujima, Hiroshiro's assistant, attempts to rape Hibino. Utao uses Kukuri to help Kyōhei and Moyako to search for Hibino.
12	"Out of Control"; Transliteration: "Bōsō" (Japanese: 暴走)	September 21, 2011
Kūko, finding out that Hibino is held hostage inside a penthouse apartment room, knocks Fujima out and rescues her. However, when they are confronted by Hiroshima, Kūko locks Hibino in the stairwell and takes Hiroshima on by herself. Kūko shoots Hiroshima and hands Fujima the gun just as someone discovers them, making it seem as though he shot Hiroshima. Meanwhile at the stairwell, Mahiru, wonders why Kyōhei gave up his position as a Seki and becomes irritated when Hibino says that too much power will bring unhappiness. Magatsuhi grab hold of Hibino and tosses her off of the building, but Kukuri arrives just in time to catch her. Mahiru, bent on having Kyōhei to herself, engages in battle again Utao. Kukuri slices through Magatsuhi's control system which causes it to act on its own and capture Hibino, ignoring Mahiru's commands. Although Kukuri manages to impale Magatsuhi on a rooftop antenna, this does not stop it from attacking relentlessly. Kōshirō and Kirio show up and attempt to help. Kōshirō in unable to do anything, then Kirio charges Takemikazuchi toward Magatsuhi, but he accidentally stabs Kukuri instead and it falls into a nearby forest. Kyōhei tries to pry Hibino from Magatsuhi's clutches but ends up being captured by Magatsuhi as well.
13	"Kuga Kyohei, the Seki"; Transliteration: "Seki Kuga Kyōhei" (Japanese: 隻・枸雅匡平)	September 28, 2011
The damaged Kukuri reawakens under Kyōhei's control and destroys Magatsuhi. Kyōhei loses consciousness and is taken to hospital. Later, on the hospital rooftop, Kyōhei blames himself for putting Hibino in danger because of his past with Aki and Mahiru. Hibino interrupts his self-flagellation by kissing him and says that she is happy to be a part of his life. Utao realizes that Kukuri is not responding to her anymore and that Moyako will need to take it back to the village for repairs. Aki appears on the balcony of the apartment and reconciles with Kyōhei before setting off. Already knowing Kukuri was assigned previous Seki before her, Utao wonders if Kukuri will remember her after it chooses other Seki in the future. A final scene shows Kyōhei utilizing the full power of Kukuri as he prepares to fight Amaterasu, which has been repaired after being buried under the Hyūga shrine.

== See also ==
- Kamunagara, another manga series by the same author
