= Sengoku Youko =

Japanese manga series

- First tankōbon volume cover

戦国妖狐 (Sengoku Yōko)
- Genre: Adventure; Fantasy
- Manga
- Written by: Satoshi Mizukami
- Published by: Mag Garden
- English publisher: NA: Tokyopop
- Imprint: Blade Comics
- Magazine: Monthly Comic Blade (December 28, 2007 – July 30, 2014); Comic Blade (September 16, 2014 – May 20, 2016)
- Original run: December 28, 2007 – May 20, 2016
- Volumes: 17
- Anime television series
- Directed by: Masahiro Aizawa
- Written by: Jukki Hanada
- Music by: Evan Call
- Studio: White Fox
- Licensed by: Crunchyroll (streaming); SA/SEA: Medialink
- Original network: Tokyo MX, ABC TV, Nagoya TV, BS Asahi
- Original run: January 11, 2024 – December 26, 2024
- Episodes: 35
- icon

Sengoku Youko (Japanese: 戦国妖狐, Hepburn: Sengoku Yōko; lit. 'Warring States Youko') is a Japanese manga series written and illustrated by Satoshi Mizukami. It was serialized in Mag Garden's Monthly Comic Blade magazine from December 2007 to July 2014, and continued on the Comic Blade web manga service from September 2014 to May 2016. An anime television series adaptation produced by White Fox aired from January to December 2024.

== Plot ==
Set in a war-torn era where humans and katawara, which are supernatural beings, coexist in tension and conflict. The story centers on Tama, a katawara who loves humans and seeks peace between the two races, and her adoptive brother Jinka, a human who harbors deep hatred toward other humans. Together, they travel the countryside confronting katawara hunters and violent warlords whose actions perpetuate suffering and division.

They are joined by the cowardly swordsman Shinsuke Hyoudou, who wishes to learn how to be strong. They become aware of darker forces at work, including monks who conduct cruel experiments on spiritually gifted people in an effort to create human-katawara hybrids. The group rescues Shakugan, a girl subjected to these experiments, and gains additional companions along the way. Together, they continue their travels, confronting powerful enemies while pursuing their individual goals in a world shaped by conflict between humans and katawara.

== Characters ==
Jinka (迅火)
Voiced by: Soma Saito
Tama (たま)
Voiced by: Yūki Takada
Shinsuke (真介)
Voiced by: Ryōhei Kimura
Shakuyaku (灼岩)
Voiced by: Tomoyo Kurosawa
Senya (千夜)
Voiced by: Hiroki Nanami
Tsukiko (月湖)
Voiced by: Maaya Uchida
Jinun (神雲)
Voiced by: Kenji Nomura
Nau (なう)
Voiced by: Aki Toyosaki
Dōren (道錬)
Voiced by: Tetsu Inada
Resshin (烈深)
Voiced by: Kazuki Miyagi
Mountain God (山の神, Yama no Kami)
Voiced by: Ayahi Takagaki
Rinzu (りんず)
Voiced by: Aina Suzuki
Yazen (野禅)
Voiced by: Kenjiro Tsuda
Raidō Zanzō (雷堂斬蔵)
Voiced by: Hiroki Tōchi
Mudo (ムド)
Voiced by: Yoshitsugu Matsuoka
Ashikaga Yoshiteru (足利義輝)
Voiced by: Wataru Hatano
Hanatora (華寅)
Voiced by: Shizuka Itō

== Media ==
=== Manga ===
Written and illustrated by Satoshi Mizukami, Sengoku Youko was serialized in Mag Garden's Monthly Comic Blade magazine from December 28, 2007, to July 30, 2014, when the magazine ceased publication. The series continued serialization on the Comic Blade web service from September 16, 2014, to May 20, 2016. Its chapters were collected in 17 tankōbon volumes from August 2008 to June 2016. Mag Garden published a six-volume shinsōban edition from November 9, 2023, to January 10, 2024.

The manga is licensed in English by Tokyopop.

==== Volumes ====
No.	Original release date	Original ISBN	English release date	English ISBN
1	August 9, 2008	978-4-86-127522-7	April 11, 2023	978-1-42-787259-3
2	February 10, 2009	978-4-86-127590-6	July 11, 2023	978-1-42-787346-0
3	November 10, 2009	978-4-86-127672-9	September 26, 2023	978-1-42-787418-4
4	April 10, 2010	978-4-86-127727-6	November 28, 2023	978-1-42-787419-1
5	November 10, 2010	978-4-86-127785-6	January 23, 2024	978-1-42-787526-6
6	March 10, 2011	978-4-86-127833-4	March 19, 2024	978-1-42-787535-8
7	August 10, 2011	978-4-86-127875-4	—	—
8	January 10, 2012	978-4-86-127932-4	—	—
9	July 10, 2012	978-4-80-000018-7	—	—
10	December 10, 2012	978-4-80-000070-5	—	—
11	June 10, 2013	978-4-80-000170-2	—	—
12	December 10, 2013	978-4-80-000239-6	—	—
13	August 9, 2014	978-4-80-000344-7	—	—
14	February 10, 2015	978-4-80-000414-7	—	—
15	August 10, 2015	978-4-80-000485-7	—	—
16	February 10, 2016	978-4-80-000533-5	—	—
17	June 10, 2016	978-4-80-000585-4	—	—

==== New edition ====
No.	Release date	ISBN
1	November 9, 2023	978-4-8000-1383-5
2	November 9, 2023	978-4-8000-1384-2
3	December 8, 2023	978-4-8000-1402-3
4	December 8, 2023	978-4-8000-1403-0
5	January 10, 2024	978-4-8000-1413-9
6	January 10, 2024	978-4-8000-1414-6

=== Anime ===
An anime television series adaptation was announced in August 2023. It is produced by White Fox and directed by Masahiro Aizawa, with series composition by Jukki Hanada, characters designed by Yosuke Okuda, and music composed by Evan Call. The series premiered on Tokyo MX and other networks, and consists of three cours for a "complete" adaptation of the manga's two story arcs: the "Yonaoshi Kyōdai-hen" (世直し姉弟編, Siblings for World Reformation Arc), which aired from January 11 to April 4, 2024, (Note: Tokyo MX listed Part 1's premiere on January 10, 2024, at 24:00, which is effectively January 11 at midnight JST) and "Senma Konton-hen" (千魔混沌編, The Chaos of a Thousand Demons Arc), which aired from July 18 to December 26 of the same year. (Note: Tokyo MX listed Part 2's premiere on July 17, 2024, at 24:00, which is effectively July 18 at midnight JST)

For the first part, the opening theme song is "Hibana" (Spark), performed by MindaRyn, while the ending theme song is "Yūyami no Uta" (夕闇のうた; lit. 'Song of Twilight') composed by Yuki Kajiura and performed by Keiko. For the second part, the opening theme song is "Katawara", performed by Stereo Dive Foundation, while the ending theme songs are "Yoru no Sui" (夜の隨), performed by Hiroki Nanami for the first cour, and "Banri Ikkū" (万里一空), performed by Rainy for the second cour. Crunchyroll streamed the series. Medialink licensed the series in South and Southeast Asia and is streaming it on the Ani-One Asia YouTube channel.

==== Episodes ====
No. overall	No. in part	Title	Directed by (Note: Production staff information is taken from the ending credits of each episode)	Storyboarded by	Original release date
Part 1: Siblings for World Reformation Arc
1	1	"We Are Those Who Lament This Barbaric Age"; Transliteration: "Warera Eansei o Ureumono" (Japanese: 我ら乱世を憂う者)	Kayona Yamada	Masahiro Aizawa	January 11, 2024
2	2	"Shakugan"; Transliteration: "Shakugan" (Japanese: 灼岩)	Katsuya Yoshii	Masahiro Aizawa	January 18, 2024
3	3	"Year Seven of the Eiroku Period"; Transliteration: "Eiroku Nana-nen" (Japanese: 永禄七年)	Hiroto Katō	Masahiro Aizawa	January 25, 2024
4	4	"Jinka and Humans"; Transliteration: "Jinka to Ningen" (Japanese: 迅火と人間)	Yōhei Fukui	Yūzō Satō	February 1, 2024
5	5	"Higan"; Transliteration: "Higan" (Japanese: 氷岩)	Toshiyuki Sone	Kazuhiro Soeta	February 8, 2024
6	6	"Fukou"; Transliteration: "Fukō" (Japanese: ふこう)	Takashi Kojima	Jun'ichi Sakata	February 15, 2024
7	7	"Kagan & Shakuyaku"; Transliteration: "Kagan to Shakuyaku" (Japanese: 火岩と芍薬)	Kayona Yamada	Yūzō Satō	February 22, 2024
8	8	"Mystic Swordsman"; Transliteration: "Makenshi" (Japanese: 魔剣士)	Hiroyuki Tsuchiya	Jun'ichi Sakata	February 29, 2024
9	9	"The Mountain Goddess (Part 1)"; Transliteration: "Yama no Kami (Zen)" (Japanese: 山の神 (前))	Tamazao Michibitsuka	Tamazao Michibitsuka	March 7, 2024
10	10	"The Mountain Goddess (Part 2)"; Transliteration: "Yama no Kami (Go)" (Japanese: 山の神 (後))	Tomomi Mikawa	Shinji Itadaki	March 14, 2024
11	11	"The Strongest of the Dangaisyuu"; Transliteration: "Dankaishū Saikyō no Otoko" (Japanese: 断怪衆最強の男)	Yoshihiro Ueda	Kazuaki Mōri	March 21, 2024
12	12	"Jinka & Douren, Takekichi & Barry"; Transliteration: "Jinka to Dōren to Takekichi to Barī" (Japanese: 迅火と道錬と竹吉とバリー)	Satoshi Saga	Jun'ichi Sakata	March 28, 2024
13	13	"Godbeast"; Transliteration: "Kamijū" (Japanese: 神獣)	Kayona Yamada	Masahiro Aizawa & Shinji Itadaki	April 4, 2024
Part 2: The Chaos of a Thousand Demons Arc
14	1	"Thousand Demon Night March"; Transliteration: "Sen Oni Yagyō" (Japanese: 千鬼夜行)	Shuichi Sasaki & Yoshihiro Ueda	Yoshihiro Ueda	July 18, 2024
15	2	"Black Dragon"; Transliteration: "Kuro Ryū" (Japanese: 黒龍)	Tomomi Mikawa	Yoshifumi Sueda	July 25, 2024
16	3	"Mad God of the Wild City"; Transliteration: "Are Miyako no Kyō-shin" (Japanese: 荒れ都の狂神)	Kageyasu Saionji	Kageyasu Saionji	August 1, 2024
17	4	"Senya & Tsukiko"; Transliteration: "Sen'ya to Tsukiko" (Japanese: 千夜と月湖)	Takashi Watanabe	Takashi Watanabe	August 8, 2024
18	5	"When the Time Comes"; Transliteration: "Toki, Kitarubeku Kitaru" (Japanese: 時, 来たるべく来る)	Mamiko Sekiya	Yoshihiro Ueda	August 15, 2024
19	6	"Above the Clouds"; Transliteration: "Kumo no Ue Made" (Japanese: 雲の上まで)	Shigeyasu Yamauchi	Shigeyasu Yamauchi	August 22, 2024
20	7	"End of a Journey"; Transliteration: "Tabi no Owari" (Japanese: 旅の終わり)	Shuichi Sasaki	Yūzō Satō	August 29, 2024
21	8	"Furuon"; Transliteration: "Furuon" (Japanese: 古恩)	Mamiko Sekiya	Kou Matsuo	September 5, 2024
22	9	"Senya and Jinun"; Transliteration: "Sen'ya to Jinun" (Japanese: 千夜と神雲)	Hiroyuki Tsuchiya	Kayona Yamada	September 12, 2024
23	10	"Senya's Eight Years"; Transliteration: "Sen'ya no Hachi-nen" (Japanese: 千夜の八年)	Arisu Yamamichi	Kenichi Imaizumi	September 19, 2024
24	11	"In Pursuit of the Thousandfold Chaotic Menagerie"; Transliteration: "Sen Ma Konton o Megutte" (Japanese: 千魔混沌を巡って)	Shuichi Sasaki	Shinji Itadaki	October 10, 2024
25	12	"To the Final Battleground"; Transliteration: "Kessen no Chi" (Japanese: 決戦の地)	Mamiko Sekiya	Kazuaki Mōri	October 17, 2024
26	13	"A Renewed Encounter"; Transliteration: "Saikai" (Japanese: 遭遇 (さいかい))	Hiroyuki Tsuchiya	Shinji Itadaki	October 24, 2024
27	14	"Awakening"; Transliteration: "Kaigan" (Japanese: 開眼)	Yūki Nishiyama & Ryōji Tanaka	Shinji Itadaki	October 31, 2024
28	15	"Banshou-oh Descends"; Transliteration: "Banshō-ō, Kōrin" (Japanese: 万象王, 降臨)	Mamiko Sekiya	Hiromitsu Kanazawa	November 7, 2024
29	16	"Dousuke & Kumozou"; Transliteration: "Dousuke to Kumozou" (Japanese: 道介と雲蔵)	Shigeyasu Yamauchi	Shigeyasu Yamauchi	November 14, 2024
30	17	"Feast of the Uncanny"; Transliteration: "Igyō-tachi no Utage" (Japanese: 異形達の宴)	Satoshi Toba	Kageyasu Saionji	November 21, 2024
31	18	"Above the Clouds"; Transliteration: "Kumo o Tobikoete" (Japanese: 雲を跳び越えて)	Mamiko Sekiya	Hiromitsu Kanazawa	November 28, 2024
32	19	"Dawn"; Transliteration: "Yoake" (Japanese: 夜明け)	Shigeyasu Yamauchi	Shigeyasu Yamauchi	December 5, 2024
33	20	"The One Who Is with Many"; Transliteration: "Ōku to Tomo ni Aru Mono" (Japanese: 多くと共に在る者)	Takashi Watanabe	Takashi Watanabe	December 12, 2024
34	21	"Jinka & Tama"; Transliteration: "Jinka to Tama" (Japanese: 迅火とたま)	Shigeyasu Yamauchi	Shigeyasu Yamauchi	December 19, 2024
35	22	"The Poem of Time's Colors in Bloom"; Transliteration: "Toki no Iro no Uta ga Saku" (Japanese: 時の彩の詩が咲く)	Shigeyasu Yamauchi	Shigeyasu Yamauchi	December 26, 2024

=== Stage play ===
A stage play adaptation of the manga's first part, "Yonaoshi Kyōdai-hen" (世直し姉弟編, Siblings for World Reformation Arc), was announced in June 2024. It ran at Theatre1010 in Adachi, Tokyo from September 24 to October 4, 2024. The play was directed and written by Naohiro Ise, with choreography by Koichi Goseki and Seijiro Nakamura handling the sword fights. The cast included Kōsuke Honda as Jinka Yamato, Momoka Onishi as Tama, Yūya Uno as Shinsuke Hyōdō, and Ui Sakura as Shakugan.
