= Encouragement of Climb =

Japanese manga series

- First manga volume cover, featuring Hinata Kuraue (left) and Aoi Yukimura (right)

ヤマノススメ (Yama no Susume)
- Genre: Slice of life, Adventure (Mountaineering)
- Manga
- Written by: Shiro
- Published by: Earth Star Entertainment
- Magazine: Comic Earth Star
- Original run: August 12, 2011 – present
- Volumes: 27
- Anime television series

Encouragement of Climb (S1–3); Encouragement of Climb: Next Summit (S4)
- Directed by: Yusuke Yamamoto
- Written by: Yusuke Yamamoto (S1, S4); Kazuyuki Fudeyasu (S2, S3)
- Music by: Flying-Pan (S1); (S2, S3); Yamazo
- Studio: Eight Bit
- Licensed by: Crunchyroll (S1–3); Sentai Filmworks (S4)
- Original network: Tokyo MX, SUN-TV, AT-X, MBS, BS11
- Original run: January 3, 2013 – December 21, 2022
- Episodes: 61 + 3 OVAs
- Original video animation

Encouragement of Climb: Omoide Present
- Directed by: Yusuke Yamamoto
- Written by: Kazuyuki Fudeyasu
- Music by: Tom-H@ck; Yamazo
- Studio: Eight Bit
- Released: October 28, 2017
- Runtime: 26 minutes
- icon

Encouragement of Climb (ヤマノススメ, Yama no Susume; lit. 'Recommendation of Mountaineering') is a slice-of-life manga series written and illustrated by Shiro, which began serialization in Earth Star Entertainment's Comic Earth Star magazine in 2011. An anime television series by Eight Bit aired in Japan between January and March 2013 and was simulcasted by Crunchyroll. A second season aired from July to December 2014. An original video animation was released in October 2017, and a third season aired from July to September 2018. A new anime television series titled Encouragement of Climb: Next Summit aired from October to December 2022.

== Plot ==
Aoi Yukimura is a quiet girl living in Hannō who prefers staying indoors and is afraid of heights. When she reunites with her childhood friend Hinata Kuraue, who is outgoing and loves mountaineering they decide to climb a mountain together, in order to see sunrise, which they saw together when they were younger. Along the way, they meet several other girls who are also interested in the outdoors, and begin a series of adventures on various mountains across Japan.

== Characters ==
Aoi Yukimura (雪村 あおい, Yukimura Aoi)
Voiced by: Yuka Iguchi
A high school girl who became afraid of heights after falling off a playground structure and breaking her leg. Thanks to Hinata's influence, she begins to take an interest in mountain climbing. In the fourth episode of Botan Kamiina Fully Blossoms When Drunk, she has a cameo in which it is revealed she opened a YouTube channel with Hinata.
Hinata Kuraue (倉上 ひなた, Kuraue Hinata)
Voiced by: Kana Asumi
A hyperactive girl who loves mountains. She was friends with Aoi in elementary school before reuniting with her in high school. She encourages Aoi to conquer her fear of heights and take up mountain climbing. In the fourth episode of Botan Kamiina Fully Blossoms When Drunk, it is revealed she became a youtuber alongside Aoi.
Kaede Saitō (斎藤 楓, Saitō Kaede)
Voiced by: Yoko Hikasa
A senior student in Aoi's high school who loves mountain climbing. She befriended Aoi when they met in an equipment store.
Kokona Aoba (青羽 ここな, Aoba Kokona)
Voiced by: Yui Ogura
A middle school student Aoi and Hinata met and befriended on a mountain trail.
Honoka Kurosaki (黒崎 ほのか, Kurosaki Honoka)
Voiced by: Nao Tōyama
A young photographer who Aoi meets while climbing Mount Tanigawa. She is a middle school student who is one grade above Kokona, and goes to a local high school in Takasaki.
Yuuka Sasahara (笹原 ゆうか, Sasahara Yūka)
Voiced by: Yui Makino
Kaede's classmate during both middle school and high school. She often worries about Kaede's safety whenever she goes climbing.
Koharu Senjuin (千手院 小春, Senjuin Koharu)
Voiced by: Emiri Iwai
The president of the Mountaineering Club in Aoi's high school. Kaede and Yuuka's classmate.
Mio (みお)
Voiced by: Kyōko Narumi (Season 1), Ayaka Nanase (After OVA)
Aoi's classmate, and sometimes talks to Aoi because she cares about her isolation.
Yuri (ゆり)
Voiced by: Yūko Gibu (Season 1), Kanon Takao (After OVA)
One of Aoi's classmates.
Kasumi Takenaka (竹中 かすみ, Takenaka Kasumi)
Voiced by: Ai Yamamoto
Aoi's classmate and has been in the same class since middle school, but has never been able to talk to her.
Makoto Yukimura (雪村 誠, Yukimura Makoto)
Voiced by: Fuminori Komatsu
Aoi's father.
Megumi Yukimura (雪村 恵, Yukimura Megumi)
Voiced by: Aya Hisakawa
Aoi's mother.
Ken'ichi Kuraue (倉上 健一, Kuraue Ken'ichi)
Voiced by: Seirō Ogino
Hinata's father, an experienced mountain climber who took Aoi and Hinata to climb Mount Tanigawa when they were younger.
Mai Kuraue (倉上 舞, Kuraue Mai)
Voiced by: Ryōka Yuzuki
Hinata's mother.
Mai Aoba (青羽 麻衣, Aoba Mai)
Voiced by: Risa Hayamizu
Kokona's mother.
Taiki Kurosaki (黒崎 大樹, Kurosaki Taiki)
Voiced by: Atsushi Imaruoka
Honoka's older brother.
Susuki (すすき, Susuki)
Voiced by: Atsushi Imaruoka
The manager of the cake shop "Susuki", where Aoi works part-time.
Hikari Onozuka (小野塚 ひかり, Onozuka Hikari)
Voiced by: Yūko Gibu
An energetic college student who works part time at a cake shop alongside Aoi.

== Media ==
=== Manga ===
Yama no Susume began as a manga series written and illustrated by Shiro and published in Earth Star Entertainment's Comic Earth Star magazine. The first chapter appeared in the September 2011 issue of the magazine, released on August 12, 2011. The series' chapters have been compiled in 27 volumes, published between June 2012, and March 2026.

No.	Release date	ISBN
1	June 12, 2012	9784803003437
2	December 12, 2012	9784803003987
3	March 12, 2013	9784803004342
4	May 11, 2013	9784803004694
5	October 12, 2013	9784803005080
6	June 12, 2014	9784803005806
7	August 12, 2014	9784803005967
8	February 12, 2015	9784803006681
9	July 11, 2015	9784803007466
10	November 12, 2015	9784803008128
11	March 12, 2016	9784803008760
12	August 12, 2016	9784803009422
13	February 13, 2017	9784803009958
14	August 10, 2017	9784803010886
15	March 12, 2018	9784803011692
16	October 12, 2018	9784803012347
17	March 12, 2019	9784803012781
18	January 20, 2020	9784803013757
19	August 12, 2020	9784803014389
20	April 12, 2021	9784803015096
21	September 10, 2021	9784803015584
22	September 12, 2022	9784803016895
23	April 12, 2023	9784803017717
24	December 13, 2023	9784803018776
25	September 12, 2024	9784803020069
26	June 12, 2025	9784803021370
27	March 12, 2026	9784803022827

=== Anime ===
An anime television series, directed by Yusuke Yamamoto and produced by Eight Bit, aired in Japan on Tokyo MX between January 3 and March 21, 2013, and was simulcasted by Crunchyroll. The ending theme is "Staccato Days" (スタッカート・デイズ, Sutakkāto Deizu) by Yuka Iguchi and Kana Asumi. The series consisted of twelve five-minute episodes, with an additional OVA episode bundled with the Blu-ray Disc release of the series on May 14, 2013.

A second season, consisting of 24 fifteen-minute episodes, began airing from July 9, 2014. The opening theme is "Natsuiro Present" (夏色プレゼント, Natsuiro Purezento; Summer-colored Present) by Iguchi, Asumi, Yōko Hikasa and Yui Ogura, "Mainichi Koharu Biyori" (毎日コハルビヨリ, Everyday Indian Summer) by Iguchi, Asumi for episode sixteen onwards; whilst the ending themes are "Tinkling Smile" by Ogura for the first twelve episodes, "Staccato Days" for episodes thirteen to fifteen, and "Cocoiro Rainbow" by Kyoko Narumi for episode sixteen onwards. An original video animation, subtitled Omoide Present (おもいでプレゼント, Omoide Purezento; lit. 'Memory Present'), was released on January 26, 2018, following a screening in theaters and a limited release on October 28, 2017. For the OVA, the ending theme is "Omoide Creators" (おもいでクリエイターズ; Memory Creators) by Iguchi and Asumi.

A third anime season premiered on July 2, 2018, and ran for 13 episodes, concluding on September 24, 2018. For the third season, the opening theme is "Chiheisen Stride" (地平線ストライド; Horizon Stride) by Iguchi, Asumi, Hikasa, and Ogura, while the ending theme is "Irochigai no Tsubasa" (色違いの翼; Wings of Different Colors) by Iguchi and Asumi.

On September 16, 2019, a new project was announced during an Autumn Festival in Japan. On March 18, 2021, it was announced that the project would be a new anime television series, titled Encouragement of Climb: Next Summit (ヤマノススメ Next Summit, Yama no Susume Nekusuto Samitto). It consisted of 12 full-length episodes, and the main staff and cast members reprised their roles from previous seasons. The series aired from October 5 to December 21, 2022. (Note: Tokyo MX lists the series premiere at 24:30 on October 4, 2022, which is effectively 12:30 a.m. JST on October 5.) The opening theme is "Omoi Nochi Hare" (想いのち晴れ; Memories, and Later Sunny) by Iguchi and Asumi, while the ending theme for the first 11 episodes is "Tobira wo Akete Beru o Narasou" (扉を開けてベルを鳴らそう; Open the Door and Ring the Bell) by Iguchi and Asumi, the ending theme for episodes 12 is "Staccato Days" by Iguchi and Asumi. Aoi and Hinata have a cameo in the anime Botan Kamiina Fully Blossoms When Drunk, which production saw the involvement of many staff members of the franchise. Iguchi and Asumi reprised their respective role, credited as "Voice from the Smartphone".

== See also ==
- Can I Take Your Photo?, another manga series by the same author
