= Kazan (manga) =

Japanese manga series

- First tankōbon volume cover
- Genre: Adventure, fantasy
- Manga
- Written by: Gaku Miyao
- Published by: Shōnen Gahosha
- English publisher: NA: ComicsOne
- Magazine: Young King OURs (1997–2000); OURs Lite (2000–2001)
- Original run: 1997 – 2000
- Volumes: 7

Kazan (stylized in all caps) is a Japanese manga series written and illustrated by Gaku Miyao. It was serialized in Shōnen Gahosha's seinen manga magazines Young King OURs (1997 to 2000) and OURs Lite (2000 to 2001), with its chapters collected in seven tankōbon volumes.

== Publication ==
Written and illustrated by Gaku Miyao, Kazan was serialized in Shōnen Gahosha's seinen manga magazine Young King OURs from the May 1997 to the July 2000 issues. The series was later transferred to OURs Lite, where it ran from the September 2000 to the August 2001 issues. Shōnen Gahosha collected its chapters in seven tankōbon volumes, released from September 1997 to June 2001.

The manga was published in English by ComicsOne in a left-to-right orientation, firstly as an Adobe ebook before being released in a print graphic novel format. The seven volumes were released in print from June 2001 to August 2002.
