= Spirit Circle =

Japanese manga series

- First tankōbon volume cover, featuring Rune (left) and Fuuta Okeya (right)

スピリットサークル (Supiritto Sākuru)
- Genre: Science fantasy; Supernatural
- Manga
- Written by: Satoshi Mizukami
- Published by: Shōnen Gahōsha
- English publisher: NA: Seven Seas Entertainment; Manga Planet (digital)
- Imprint: Young King Comics
- Magazine: Young King OURs
- Original run: May 30, 2012 – March 30, 2016
- Volumes: 6
- Anime television series
- Directed by: Tatsuo Sato
- Written by: Tatsuo Sato
- Studio: Nagomi; EOTA
- Licensed by: Remow
- Original run: December 2026 – scheduled
- Episodes: 18
- icon

Spirit Circle (Japanese: スピリットサークル, Hepburn: Supiritto Sākuru) is a Japanese manga series written and illustrated by Satoshi Mizukami. It was serialized in Shōnen Gahōsha's seinen manga magazine Young King OURs from May 2012 to March 2016, with its chapters collected in six tankōbon volumes. The manga received a digital simultaneous publication release in English by Crunchyroll Manga, while Seven Seas Entertainment later licensed the series for a print release. An anime television series adaptation produced by Nagomi and EOTA is set to premiere in December 2026.

By 2022, Spirit Circle had sold 250,000 physical copies.

== Plot ==
Fuuta Okeya is a high school student who can see ghosts and has a strange mark on his cheek that he hides. When Kouko Ishigami, a new student, arrives in his class with a scar on her forehead and accompanied by a ghost named East, Fuuta's tranquillity ends. After a failed attempt by Fuuta to make friends with Kouko and after she sees his mark, Kouko declares him to be her enemy, attacking him with a mysterious spiritual circle made of flames. The hostilities between the two date back to their reincarnation, and Fuuta will have to discover his past and his links with Kouko, East, and Rune, the spirit of a girl who suddenly appears.

== Characters ==
Fuuta Okeya (桶屋 風太, Okeya Fūta)
Voiced by: Kazuki Ura
A fourteen-year-old with the ability to see and communicate with ghosts.
Kouko Ishigami (石神 鉱子, Ishigami Kōko)
Voiced by: Anna Nagase
Fuuta's deadly enemy. She recovered her past life's memory after a car accident that left a scar on her forehead.
Rune (ルン, Run)
Voiced by: Eri Yukimura
East (イースト, Īsuto)
Voiced by: Yuichi Nakamura

== Media ==
=== Manga ===
Written and illustrated by Satoshi Mizukami, Spirit Circle was serialized in Shōnen Gahōsha's seinen manga magazine Young King OURs from May 30, 2012, to March 30, 2016. Shōnen Gahōsha collected its chapters in six tankōbon volumes, released from December 10, 2012, to June 10, 2016.

The manga was first licensed for a simultaneous publication in English by Crunchyroll Manga in 2014. In January 2017, Seven Seas Entertainment announced that they had licensed the manga for English release in North America. Manga Planet added the series to its digital service in May 2020.

==== Volumes ====
No.	Original release date	Original ISBN	English release date	English ISBN
1	December 10, 2012	978-4-7859-3983-0	October 10, 2017	978-1-626926-01-1
2	July 30, 2013	978-4-7859-5097-2	January 9, 2018	978-1-626926-80-6
3	April 3, 2014	978-4-7859-5255-6	April 17, 2018	978-1-626927-29-2
4	November 29, 2014	978-4-7859-5433-8	July 10, 2018	978-1-626928-32-9
5	August 29, 2015	978-4-7859-5433-8	October 9, 2018	978-1-626929-24-1
6	June 10, 2016	978-4-7859-5793-3	January 8, 2019	978-1-626929-86-9

=== Anime ===
In November 2026, an anime television series adaptation produced by Twin Engine and animated by Nagomi and EOTA was announced. It will be written and directed by Tatsuo Sato in his final directorial work, with Kentaro Mizuno serving as assistant director, and Satoru Fujimoto designing the characters. The 18-episode series is set to premiere in December 2026. The ending theme song is "No Matter the World" (此処がどんな世界でも, Koko ga Donna Sekai Demo), performed by Anna Nagase. Remow has licensed the series.

== Reception ==
Spirit Circle was nominated for the 48th Seiun Award in the comic category in 2017.

By 2022, the manga had sold 250,000 physical copies.
