= Lucifer and the Biscuit Hammer =

Japanese manga series

- First tankōbon volume cover, featuring Noi Crezant, Yuuhi Amamiya, and Samidare Asahina

惑星のさみだれ (Hoshi no Samidare)
- Genre: Adventure; Fantasy comedy
- Manga
- Written by: Satoshi Mizukami
- Published by: Shōnen Gahōsha
- English publisher: NA: JManga (former); Seven Seas Entertainment (current)
- Imprint: Young King Comics
- Magazine: Young King OURs
- Original run: 28 April 2005 – 30 August 2010
- Volumes: 10
- Anime television series
- Directed by: Nobuaki Nakanishi
- Written by: Satoshi Mizukami; Yūichirō Momose
- Music by: Takatsugu Wakabayashi
- Studio: NAZ (Note: Production assistance (制作協力) for all episodes provided by Jumondou.)
- Licensed by: Crunchyroll: SA/SEA: Muse Communication
- Original network: MBS, TBS, BS-TBS, BS11, GYT, AT-X
- Original run: 9 July 2022 – 24 December 2022
- Episodes: 24
- Manga

Sono Ato no Hero
- Written by: Ichiri Seto
- Published by: Shōnen Gahōsha
- Imprint: Young King Comics
- Magazine: Young King OURs
- Published: 30 September 2022
- Volumes: 1
- icon

Lucifer and the Biscuit Hammer, known in Japan as Samidare of the Stars (Japanese: 惑星のさみだれ, Hepburn: Hoshi no Samidare), (Note: The series is also known as The Lucifer and Biscuit Hammer, which is seen on the cover of Japanese version of the manga, and Hoshi no Samidare: The Lucifer and Biscuit Hammer, which is the title used by JManga and Crunchyroll.) is a Japanese manga series written and illustrated by Satoshi Mizukami. It was serialized in Shōnen Gahōsha's seinen manga magazine Young King OURs from April 2005 to August 2010, with its chapters collected in ten tankōbon volumes. Seven Seas Entertainment published the series in North America.

An anime television series adaptation by NAZ aired from July to December 2022 on the Animeism programming block.

By 2022, the manga had sold 650,000 physical copies.

== Plot ==
Yuuhi Amamiya is a young, misanthropic college student who one day wakes up to find a lizard on his bed. The lizard explains that Yuuhi has been chosen as a Beast Knight, a magical warrior destined to help a princess defeat a mage seeking to destroy the world with a giant mallet floating in space called the Biscuit Hammer. While Yuuhi initially is not interested in getting involved, he changes his mind when he meets the princess, Samidare Asahina, who tells him her intent to defeat the mage and save the world so she can destroy it herself.

== Characters ==
=== The Beast Knights ===
Yuuhi Amamiya (雨宮 夕日, Amamiya Yūhi)
Voiced by: Junya Enoki, Kaede Hondo (young)^{Ep. 2 credits} (Japanese); Lee George, Dani Chambers (young) (English)
Yuuhi is the Lizard Knight. A misanthropic college student, he ultimately agrees to save the Earth so Samidare can destroy it instead.
Samidare Asahina (朝日奈 さみだれ, Asahina Samidare)
Voiced by: Naomi Ōzora (Japanese); Ariel Graham, Macy Anne Johnson (young) (English)
Samidare is the princess of the Beast Knights who serves as Anima's vessel. She secretly wants to destroy the planet herself.
Hangetsu Shinonome (東雲 半月, Shinonome Hangetsu)
Voiced by: Shuuhei Iwase, Anna Kitamoto (young) (Japanese); Matt Shipman, Samantha Herek (young) (English)
Hangetsu is the Dog Knight. He is a martial arts expert who wants to be a hero of justice.
Mikazuki Shinonome (東雲 三日月, Shinonome Mikazuki)
Voiced by: Gen Satō (Japanese); Clifford Chapin, Kristin Paybe (young) (English)
Mikazuki is the Crow Knight who is a college student and Hangetsu's younger brother. While he normally has a friendly and outgoing personality, he becomes obsessed with fighting once he comes across a worthy opponent.
Souichirou Nagumo (南雲 宗一朗, Nagumo Sōichirō)
Voiced by: Tetsu Inada (Japanese); Marcus D. Stimac (English)
Souichirou is the Horse Knight. He was a detective prior to being a Beast Knight. He serves as a fatherly figure for the knights and is fiercely protective of the younger members.
Yayoi Hakudou (白道 八宵, Hakudō Yayoi)
Voiced by: Aya Suzaki (Japanese); Natalie Rose Hoover (English)
Yayoi is the Snake Knight. She is a kind woman who is skilled at swordplay and is into anime, manga, and cosplay. She develops feelings for Yuuhi after he rescues her.
Taiyou Akane (茜 太陽, Akane Taiyō)
Voiced by: Mutsumi Tamura (Japanese); SuzAnne DeCarma (English)
Taiyou is the Owl Knight. He is a young boy who is withdrawn and estranged from his family.
Hyou Shimaki (風巻 豹, Shimaki Hyō)
Voiced by: Yoshitsugu Matsuoka (Japanese); Travis Mullenix (English)
Shimaki is the Cat Knight. He is a man who is very passionate about knowledge and is capable of producing his own golems.
Subaru Hoshikawa (星川 昴, Hoshikawa Subaru)
Voiced by: Chihaya Yoshitake (Japanese); Trisha Mellon (English)
Subaru is the Rooster Knight who is Yukimachi's best friend. She is the more sensitive of the two and she has a crush on Mikazuki.
Yukimachi Tsukishiro (月代 雪待, Tsukishiro Yukimachi)
Voiced by: Moeha Nochimoto (Japanese); Corinne Sudberg (English)
Yukimachi is the Turtle Knight who is Subaru's best friend. She is the more boisterous of the two.
Inachika Akitani (秋谷 稲近, Akitani Inachika)
Voiced by: Kazuhiro Yamaji, Haruki Ishiya (young)^{Ep. 9 credits} (Japanese); R. Bruce Elliott, Ben Balmaceda (young) (English)
Akitani is the Swordfish Knight who has lived for over 500 years. He serves as Subaru and Yukimachi's master.
Tarou Kusakabe (日下部 太朗, Kusakabe Tarō)
Voiced by: Shun'ichi Toki, Hana Tamegai (young) (Japanese); Tristan Bonner, Hannah Alyea (young) (English)
Tarou is the Mouse Knight. He is a kind high school student who wants to become a chef after graduating and is in love with his childhood friend, Hanako.
Hanako Sorano (宙野 花子, Sorano Hanako)
Voiced by: Chinatsu Hirose (Japanese); Dani Chambers (English)
Hanako is the Mantis Knight. A childhood friend of Tarou's, she is an intelligent high school student who is reserved and rarely shows her emotions.

=== Familiars ===
Noi Crezant (ノイ=クレザント, Noi Kurezanto)
Voiced by: Kenjiro Tsuda (Japanese); Kent Williams (English)
Noi is the lizard familiar assigned to Yuuhi. He often lectures Yuuhi and tries to steer him in the right direction.
Ludo Shubarie (ルド=シュバリエ, Rudo Shubarie)
Voiced by: Shōya Ishige (Japanese); Christopher Wehkamp (English)
Ludo is the dog familiar assigned to Hangetsu. He is intuitive and devoted to his role.
Muu (ムー, Mū)
Voiced by: Atsuko Tanaka (Japanese); Monica Rial (English)
Muu is the crow familiar assigned to Mikazuki. She rarely speaks.
Dance Dark (ダンス=ダーク, Dansu Dāku)
Voiced by: Kentarō Kumagai (Japanese); Michael Stimac (English)
Dance is the horse familiar assigned to Souichirou. While he takes his role seriously, he does not like to be ridden.
Shea Moon (シア=ムーン, Shia Mūn)
Voiced by: Hyo-sei (Japanese); Morgan Lauré (English)
Shea is the snake familiar assigned to Yayoi. He is supportive of Yayoi and encourages her to be more open about her hobbies and feelings.
Loki Helios (ロキ=ヘリオス, Roki Heriosu)
Voiced by: Manabu Muraji (Japanese); Martin Cervantes (English)
Loki is the owl familiar assigned to Taiyou. Despite his cynical nature, he completely supports whatever decision Taiyou makes.
Coo Ritter (クー=リッター, Kū Rittā)
Voiced by: Nagisa Kakegawa (Japanese); Megan Shipman (English)
Coo is the cat familiar assigned to Shimaki. He is polite and tries to help Shimaki whenever he has a chance.
Lee Soleil (リー=ソレイユ, Rī Soreiyu)
Voiced by: Mitsuo Iwata (Japanese); Wyatt Baker (English)
Lee is the rooster familiar assigned to Subaru. He is very protective of Subaru and is prone to speaking his mind.
Ron Yue (ロン=ユエ)
Voiced by: Katsuji Mori (Japanese); Greg Dulce (English)
Ron is the turtle familiar assigned to Yukimachi. He has a laid-back personality.
Zan Amal (ザン=アマル, Zan Amaru)
Voiced by: Tetsuei Sumiya (Japanese); Justin Briner (English)
Zan is the swordfish familiar assigned to Akitani. Due to his appearance, he tries to warn people when he arrives.
Lance Lumiere (ランス=リュミエール, Ransu Ryumiēru)
Voiced by: Kazutomi Yamamoto (Japanese); Rachel Glass (English)
Lance is the mouse familiar assigned to Tarou. He does not get along with Kil.
Kil Zonne (キル=ゾンネ, Kiru Zon'ne)
Voiced by: Ruriko Aoki (Japanese); Kasi Hollowell (English)
Kil is the mantis familiar assigned to Hanako. He has a cold and ruthless personality.

=== Others ===
Anima (アニマ)
Voiced by: M.A.O (Japanese); Jessica Peterson, Kristin Sutton (young) (English)
Anima is a woman who provides the knights their powers. She is trying to stop Animus from destroying the planet.
Animus (アニムス, Animusu)
Voiced by: Tatsumaru Tachibana, Hitomi Ueda (young) (Japanese); Alex Mai, Kristen McGuire (young) (English)
Animus is the mysterious mage who wants to destroy the planet with the Biscuit Hammer.
Hisame Asahina (朝日奈 氷雨, Asahina Hisame)
Voiced by: Azusa Tadokoro (Japanese); Monica Rial (English)
Hisame is Samidare's older sister who works as a college professor at Yuuhi and Mikazuki's university.

== Media ==
=== Manga ===
Written and illustrated by Satoshi Mizukami, Lucifer and the Biscuit Hammer was serialized in Shōnen Gahōsha's seinen magazine Young King OURs from 28 April 2005 to 30 August 2010. Shōnen Gahōsha collected its chapters in ten tankōbon volumes, released from 27 January 2006 to 30 November 2010.

JManga began publishing the series digitally in North America in February 2012. The company published the first five volumes before they shut down in May 2013. It was subsequently licensed by Seven Seas Entertainment in November 2013. Crunchyroll added the series to their online catalog in September 2014, while BookWalker added it on 18 November 2015. Seven Seas published the series in five two-in-one omnibus volumes.

A spinoff manga written by Ichiri Seto and supervised by Satoshi Mizukami, titled Sono Ato no Hero (その後のヒーロー; "The Hero Afterwards"), was serialized in the November 2022 issue of Young King OURs, which was released on 30 September 2022. It focuses on the character Mikazuki Shinonome. Shōnen Gahōsha published one volume digitally on 10 November 2022.

==== Volumes ====
===== Lucifer and the Biscuit Hammer =====
No.	Title	Original release date	English release date
1	The Lizard Knight; Tokage no Kishi (トカゲの騎士)	27 January 2006; 978-4-7859-2605-2	4 November 2014; 978-1-626920-85-9
1. "Amamiya Yuuhi and the Lizard Knight" (雨宮夕日とトカゲの騎士, Amamiya Yūhi to Tokage no Kishi); 2. "The Lucifer and the Biscuit Hammer" (小さな魔王とビスケットハンマー, Chīsana Maō to Bisuketto Hanmā); 3. "Amamiya Yuuhi and Asahina Samidare" (雨宮夕日と朝日奈さみだれ, Amamiya Yūhi to Asahina Samidare); 4. "Yuuhi, Romantic Comedy, and the Axe Kick" (夕日とラブコメとカカト落とし, Yūhi to Rabukome to Kakato Otoshi); 5. "Yuuhi, a Cold, and By Your Command" (夕日と風邪とご命令を, Yūhi to Kaze to go Meirei o); 6. "The Knight and the Contract" (騎士と契約, Kishi to Keiyaku); 7. "Amamiya Yuuhi the Knight" (騎士 雨宮夕日, Kishi Amamiya Yūhi); 8. "The Dog Knight and Shinonome Hangetsu" (犬の騎士と東雲半月, Inu no Kishi to Shinonome Hangetsu)
2	The Dog Knight; Inu no Kishi (犬の騎士)	27 September 2006; 978-4-7859-2687-8	4 November 2014; 978-1-626920-85-9
9. "Hangetsu and the Golem" (半月と泥人形, Hangetsu to Doro Ningyō); 10. "Yuuhi, Anime, and Hangetsu's Bane" (夕日とアニメと半月攻略法, Yūhi to Anime to Hangetsu Kōryakuhō); 11. "The Asahina Sisters and Their Father's Return" (朝日奈姉妹と父帰る, Asahina Shimai to Chichikaeru); 12. "Promise of Death on a Day of Birth" (生まれた日に死の覚悟, Umaretahi ni Shi no Kakugo); 13. "Shinonome Hangetsu the Knight (Part One)" (騎士 東雲半月（前編）, Kishi Shinonome Hangetsu (Zenpen)); 14. "Shinonome Hangetsu the Knight (Part Two)" (騎士 東雲半月（後編）, Kishi Shinonome Hangetsu (Kōhen)); 15. "Asahina Hisame and Shinonome Hangetsu" (朝日奈氷雨と東雲半月, Asahina Hisame to Shinonome Hangetsu); 16. "The Crow Knight and Shinonome Mikazuki" (カラスの騎士と東雲三日月, Karasu no Kishi to Shinonome Mikazuki)
3	The Beast Knights; Kemono no Kishidan (獣の騎士団)	28 May 2007; 978-4-7859-2787-5	17 February 2015; 978-1-626921-15-3
17. "The Horse Knight and Nagumo Souichirou" (馬の騎士と南雲総一朗, Uma no Kishi to Nagumo Sōichirō); 18. "Traumatic Chains" (鎖（トラウマ）, Kusari (Torauma)); 19. "Roar" (咆哮, Hōkō); 20. "Amamiya Yuuhi and the Shinonome Brothers" (雨宮夕日と東雲兄弟, Amamiya Yūhi to Shinonome Kyōdai); 21. "Dark Enemy" (敵（やみ）, Teki (Yami)); 22. "Amamiya Yuuhi and the Beast Knights (Part One)" (雨宮夕日と獣の騎士団（前編）, Amamiya Yūhi to Kemono no Kishidan (Zenpen)); 23. "Amamiya Yuuhi and the Beast Knights (Part Two)" (雨宮夕日と獣の騎士団（後編）, Amamiya Yūhi to Kemono no Kishidan (Kōhen))
4	Knights of the Ring; Yubiwa no Kishi (指輪の騎士)	26 October 2007; 978-4-7859-2872-8	17 February 2015; 978-1-626921-15-3
24. "Hakudou Yayoi and the Snake Knight" (白道八宵とヘビの騎士, Hakudō Yayoi to Hebi no Kishi); 25. "The Selfish Man and the Horse Knight" (私情の男と馬の騎士, Shijō no Otoko to Uma no kishi); 26. "Kusakabe Tarou and the Mouse Knight" (日下部太朗とネズミの騎士, Kusakabe Tarō to Nezumi no Kishi); 27. "The Wizard and Shimaki Hyou" (魔法使いと風巻 豹, Mahōtsukai to Shimaki Hyō); 28. "Akitani Inatika (Part One)" (秋谷稲近（前編）, Akitani Inachika (Zenpen)); 29. "Akitani Inatika (Part Two)" (秋谷稲近（後編）, Akitani Inachika (Kōhen))
5	Princess; Seirei (精霊)	26 May 2008; 978-4-7859-2967-1	19 May 2015; 978-1-626921-30-6
30. "Hekatombaion and the Beast Knights" (ヘカトンバイオンと獣の騎士団, Hekatonbaion to Kemono no Kishidan); 31. "The Asahina Family (Part One)" (朝日奈家・1, Asahina-ke 1); 32. "The Asahina Family (Part Two)" (朝日奈家・2, Asahina-ke 2); 33. "The Asahina Family (Part Three)" (朝日奈家・3, Asahina-ke 3); 34. "Princess Anima and the Beast Knights" (精霊アニマと獣の騎士団, Seirei Anima to Kemono no Kishidan); 35. "Metageitnion and the Beast Knights" (メタゲイトニオンと獣の騎士団, Metageitonion to Kemono no Kishidan)
6	Hero; Yūsha (勇者)	29 October 2008; 978-4-7859-3050-9	19 May 2015; 978-1-626921-30-6
36. "Akane Taiyou and the Owl Knight" (茜太陽とフクロウの騎士, Akane Taiyō to Fukurō no Kishi); 37. "Kusakabe Tarou the Brave" (勇者 日下部太朗, Yūsha Kusakabe Tarō); 38. "Kusakabe Tarou and the Beast Knights" (日下部太朗と獣の騎士団, Kusakabe Tarō to Kemono no Kishidan); 39. "The Invisible" (黒竜（インビジブル）, Kokuryū (Inbijiburu)); 40. "Sorano Hanako the Knight" (騎士 宙野花子（前編）, Kishi Sorano Hanako (Zenpen)); 41. "Sorano Hanako the Knight" (騎士 宙野花子（後編）, Kishi Sorano Hanako (Kōhen))
7	Children; Kodomo (子供)	30 April 2009; 978-4-7859-3153-7	25 August 2015; 978-1-626921-69-6
42. "Amamiya Yuuhi and the Shinonome Brothers (Part Two)" (雨宮夕日と東雲兄弟・2, Amamiya Yūhi to Shinonome Kyōdai 2); 43. "Yukimachi and Subaru" (雪待と昴, Yukimachi to Subaru); 44. "Taiyou and the Golem" (太陽と泥人形, Taiyō to Doro Ningyō); 45. "Taiyou and Mikazuki" (太陽と三日月, Taiyō to Mikazuki); 46. "The Heroes and the Children" (ヒーローと子供達, Hīrō to Kodomodachi); 47. "The Boy Akane Taiyou" (少年 茜太陽, Shōnen Akane Taiyō)
8	Spirit; Seishin (精神)	10 November 2009; 978-4-7859-3262-6	25 August 2015; 978-1-626921-69-6
48. "Golems and Golem Users" (泥人形と泥人形遣い, Doro Ningyō to Doro Ningyō Tsukai); 49. "Before the Door" (扉の先, Tobira no Saki); 50. "Amamiya Yuuhi and Shinonome Hangetsu" (雨宮夕日と東雲半月, Amamiya Yūhi to Shinonome Hangetsu); 51. "Inkoman and the Beast Knights" (インコマンと獣の騎士団, Inkoman to Kemono no Kishidan); 52. "Maimakterion and the Beast Knights (Part One)" (マイマクテリオンと獣の騎士団（前編）, Maimakuterion to Kemono no Kishidan (Zenpen)); 53. "Maimakterion and the Beast Knights (Part Two)" (マイマクテリオンと獣の騎士団（後編）, Maimakuterion to Kemono no Kishidan (Kōhen))
9	The Final Battle; Saigo no Tatakai (最後の戦い)	19 May 2010; 978-4-7859-3385-2	24 November 2015; 978-1-626921-84-9
54. "Anima and Animus" (アニマとアニムス, Anima to Animusu); 55. "Amamiya Yuuhi and Asahina Samidare (Part Two)" (雨宮夕日と朝日奈さみだれ・2, Amamiya Yūhi to Asahina Samidare 2); 56. "The Last Battle (Part One)" (最後の戦い・1, Saigo no Tatakai 1); 57. "The Last Battle (Part Two)" (最後の戦い・2, Saigo no Tatakai 2); 58. "The Last Battle (Part Three)" (最後の戦い・3, Saigo no Tatakai 3); 59. "The Last Battle (Part Four)" (最後の戦い・4, Saigo no Tatakai 4)
10	It's All For You; Zenbu Kimi no Tame ni Aru (全部 きみのためにある)	30 November 2010; 978-4-7859-3518-4	24 November 2015; 978-1-626921-84-9
60. "Lucifer and the Biscuit Hammer (Part One)" (惑星のさみだれ・1, Hoshi no Samidare 1); 61. "Lucifer and the Biscuit Hammer (Part Two)" (惑星のさみだれ・2, Hoshi no Samidare 2); 62. "Lucifer and the Biscuit Hammer (Part Three)" (惑星のさみだれ・3, Hoshi no Samidare 3); 63. "Lucifer and the Biscuit Hammer (Part Four)" (惑星のさみだれ・4, Hoshi no Samidare 4); 64. "Lucifer and the Biscuit Hammer (Part Five)" (ほしのさみだれ, Wakusei no Samidare); 65. "That Which Ends and That Which Continues" (終わるものと続くもの, Owaru Mono to Tsudzuku Mono)

===== Sono Ato no Hero =====
No.	Release date	ISBN
1	10 November 2022	978-4-09-128187-6

=== Anime ===
An anime television series adaptation was announced on 24 January 2022. The series was produced by NAZ and directed by Nobuaki Nakanishi, with Satoshi Mizukami, the original author, and Yūichirō Momose writing the scripts, Hajime Hatakeyama designing the characters, and Takatsugu Wakabayashi composing the music. It aired from 9 July to 24 December 2022, on the Animeism programming block on MBS, TBS, and BS-TBS. (Note: MBS listed the series premiere at 25:55 on 8 July 2022, which is effectively 9 July at 1:55 a.m. JST.) The first opening theme song is "Gyōkō" (暁光; "Dawn Light") by Half time Old, while the first ending theme song is "Reflexion" by SpendyMily. (Note: "Gyōkō" is used as an insert song in Episode 24.) The second opening theme song is "Be the Hero" by Raon. Sano Ibuki performed the second ending theme song "Zero" from Episodes 13–17 and 19–24, while the Pillows performed the third ending theme song "Poem of Babylon Angel" (バビロン天使の詩) for Episode 18. (Note: "Poem of Babylon Angel" is heard during the end credits of Episode 18.)

Crunchyroll has licensed the series, and has also began streaming an English dub starting on 22 July 2022. Muse Communication licensed the series in South and Southeast Asia.

==== Episodes ====
No.	Title (Note: All English titles are taken from Crunchyroll.)	Directed by (Note: Information is taken from the ending credits of each episode.)	Written by	Storyboarded by	Original release date
1	"Amamiya Yuuhi and the Lizard Knight"; Transliteration: "Amamiya Yūhi to Tokage no Kishi" (Japanese: 雨宮夕日とトカゲの騎士)	Kiyoto Nakajima	Yūichirō Momose	Ice Mugino	9 July 2022
College student Yuuhi Amamiya awakens to a lizard in his room that calls itself Noi, a Beast Knight assisting a princess in saving the world. Believing he is hallucinating, Yuuhi simply throws the lizard away. Unfortunately, Noi keeps reappearing, explaining they are bound. A ring appears on Yuuhi's hand allowing him to use magic, though he gets in trouble when he uses telekinesis to see up the skirt of his professor, Hisame. Noi demands Yuuhi locate the princess and defeat an evil mage, but he refuses. He is suddenly attacked by a golem and only survives when his next door neighbor, Samidare Asahina, saves him and is revealed as the princess with the spirit Anima inhabiting her body. Samidare is able to show Yuuhi the evil mage's most powerful weapon, a Moon sized hammer called the Biscuit Hammer just outside Earth's atmosphere. To prove Yuuhi is a Beast Knight, Samidare jumps from the roof and he instinctively saves her. Noi is angered to learn Samidare plans to defeat the evil mage, but only so she can conquer Earth herself. Yuuhi then pledges his loyalty.
2	"Amamiya Yuuhi and Asahina Samidare"; Transliteration: "Amamiya Yūhi to Asahina Samidare" (Japanese: 雨宮夕日と朝日奈さみだれ)	Shunji Yoshida	Yūichirō Momose	Ice Mugino	16 July 2022
Yuuhi has a nightmare of his grandfather chaining and warning him to make neither enemies nor friends. As his magic is linked to his stamina, he takes up exercise and is awed by how much stronger Samidare is. At Samidare's home, Yuuhi gets in trouble when he sees Hisame in her panties. Yuuhi realizes being with Samidare is fun but has another flashback of chains. When he asks Samidare why she wants to destroy the world, she explains why. Yuuhi is attacked by another golem and Samidare saves him again. Yuuhi's aunt informs him his grandfather is in hospital. Attempting to hone his agility so he can escape the golems, Yuuhi tries to fly across a river, but falls in and catches a fever. He sees chains but recovers with Samidare holding his hand. Yuuhi reveals that as a child, his grandfather chained him in a shed to teach him a lesson after he made a friend. As such, he is still terrified of chains. Samidare insists he visit his grandfather and she will make sure chains do not frighten him anymore. Yuuhi decides he will go and grow stronger from the experience.
3	"The Knight and the Pact"; Transliteration: "Kishi to Keiyaku" (Japanese: 騎士と契約)	Mae Sawada	Yūichirō Momose	Mae Sawada	23 July 2022
Yuuhi tells Noi his father was a police officer murdered by his own partner, and his death broke his mother's heart who disappeared shortly after. He was then raised by his grandfather who taught him not to trust others. Yuuhi's grandfather claims to have changed, and though he apologizes, Yuuhi cannot forgive him. A golem then attacks Yuuhi at the hospital. Dying from exhaustion, Yuuhi hallucinates Samidare and apologizes for using her. Samidare offers to trade a kiss if he survives. Awakening, Yuuhi tricks and destroys the golem. Though still unwilling to forgive, Yuuhi accepts his contract with Noi to become a knight and in exchange, uses a wish to cure his grandfather. While asleep, Yuuhi almost kisses Samidare, but awakens before she can. Returning home, he resumes training with Samidare. They are confronted by Shinonome Hangetsu, the Dog Knight, and his dog partner Ludo. They claim to be protectors of justice, so Yuuhi worries how they will react to Samidare's plan. As a martial artist, Hangetsu judges them both. That night, Yuuhi finally receives his kiss from Samidare and resolves to become stronger.
4	"Asahina Hisame and Shinonome Hangetsu"; Transliteration: "Asahina Hisame to Shinonome Hangetsu" (Japanese: 朝日奈氷雨と東雲半月)	Yasuo Ejima	Yūichirō Momose	Yasuo Ejima	30 July 2022
Samidare acts awkward around Yuuhi as she experienced the same dream he had. While they are training with Hangetsu, Ludo believes Yuuhi is too sinister to trust. Hangetsu soon falls instantly in love with Hisame. Another golem then appears, which is defeated by Hangetsu. Hisame reveals to Yuuhi that Hangetsu actually has a younger brother, Mikazuki, who is also enrolled in the college but is not attending classes. Hisame and Samidare's father later appears after a long absence writing his new novel. While out drinking, Hisame reveals to Yuuhi and Hangetsu Samidare was sick as a child so she and their mother flew to France to research a cure, but Samidare miraculously recovered on her own. She then criticizes her father for being gone all the time, which upsets him as he is eavesdropping nearby. Hisame and Hangetsu end up drunk so Yuuhi and Samidare carry them home. Hisame and Hangetsu drunkenly rant about how being an adult is showing younger people how to have hope, making Yuuhi and Samidare feel guilty.
5	"The Knight, Shinonome Hangetsu"; Transliteration: "Kishi Shinonome Hangetsu" (Japanese: 騎士 東雲半月)	Takahiro Ono	Yūichirō Momose	Nagisa Miyazaki	6 August 2022
Hisame orders Yuuhi to take Samidare on a date and not to return before evening. At the restaurant, he is secretly confronted by Samidare's father who invites him to her birthday party. After the party, Samidare confides to Yuuhi she never planned to have a future since she thought she would die as a child. Samidare's father departs on another trip but gives Hangetsu tickets to a movie Hisame wants to see. Hangetsu drinks with Yuuhi and discuss their powers where Hangetsu is angry his power does not let him fly. He also reveals he knows Samidare is plotting something that will make him her enemy one day. Another golem attacks and Yuuhi decides to attack rather than run. The golem kills Hangetsu so Ludo grants his wish and his soul is reunited with his childhood dog in heaven. Ludo disappears following Hangetsu's death and Yuuhi is paralyzed with fear and unable to run until Samidare punches the golem so hard she causes the mountain to collapse. The authorities locate Hangetsu's body and blame his death on the landslide.
6	"The Crow Knight and Shinonome Mikazuki"; Transliteration: "Karasu no Kishi to Shinonome Mikazuki" (Japanese: カラスの騎士と東雲三日月)	Seung Deok Kim	Yūichirō Momose	Ryōji Fujiwara	13 August 2022
Yuuhi guiltily admits to Noi he wished for Hangetsu to die. Hangetsu's younger brother, Mikazuki, appears with a crow named Muu, revealing himself as the Crow Knight. While Mikazuki assures Yuuhi he has no hard feelings for Hangetsu's death, Yuuhi continues to blame himself, so Mikazuki goads him into a fist fight. The Horse Knight, Souichirou Nagumo, appears with his horse Dance Dark and reveals he has located three other knights, Loki the Owl, Kuh the Cat, and Sia the Snake. He then departs and Yuuhi worries he will have to kill all other knights. Mikazuki challenges Souichirou to a duel but he flees instead. The next day, two golems appear. Samidare destroys one and the knights head for the second golem. Souichirou is forced to defeat Mikazuki when he tries to duel him. Yuuhi is paralyzed by his fear of dying and is saved by Snake Knight, Yayoi Hakudou, who warns him to avoid battle. Desperate to prove himself, the next time a golem appears, Yuuhi rushes to fight it and arrives in time to help Yayoi.
7	"Amamiya Yuuhi and the Beast Knights (Part 1)"; Transliteration: "Amamiya Yūhi to Kemono no Kishidan (Zenpen)" (Japanese: 雨宮夕日と獣の騎士団（前編）)	Seung Deok Kim	Yūichirō Momose	Minoru Yamaoka	20 August 2022
Yuuhi begins to beat the golem using Hangetsu's martial art. One golem devours the other, growing much larger but it is still defeated by Samidare. Noi realizes Hangetsu passed his powers to Yuuhi. Yayoi lures Yuuhi to the park so Mikazuki can fight him too. However, Mikazuki is disappointed as Yuuhi has Hangetsu's skills but no experience. They discover the still living golem but a man emerges from its mouth. Noi realizes he was Animus, the evil mage. The Cat Knight, Hyou Shimaki, and his cat Kuh arrive by themselves. Souichirou locates the young child Owl Knight Taiyou Akane and owl Loki Helios. Mikazuki also locates two knights who are middle school students, Turtle Knight Yukimachi Tsukishiro with turtle Long Yue, and Rooster Knight Subaru Hoshikawa with rooster Ly Soleil. They reveal their master the Swordfish Knight has already died. By coincidence, Yuuhi bumps into the two remaining knights on the street; Mouse Knight Tarou Kusakabe with mouse Lance Lumiere, and Mantis Knight Hanako Sorano with mantis Kir Sonne. As Yuuhi has made friends with the knights, Samidare reveals she loves him and still wants his help to destroy the world. With all the knights gathered, Samidare announces they must prepare for Animus.
8	"Amamiya Yuuhi and the Beast Knights (Part 2)"; Transliteration: "Amamiya Yūhi to Kemono no Kishidan (Kōhen)" (Japanese: 雨宮夕日と獣の騎士団（後編）)	Mae Sawada	Yūichirō Momose	Ryōji Fujiwara	27 August 2022
Souichirou reveals to Yuuhi and Samidare that he has a wife and son and used to be a detective before growing tired of the corruption, so he quit the day Dance Dark arrived. It is revealed Animus is in contact with Shimaki and he knows Shimaki's wish for all knowledge in the universe to become an omnipotent being was rejected. Since they share a similar desire, he asks Shimaki to become his ally. They are then spotted together by Subaru and Yukimachi so Animus flees. That night in a shared dream, Animus claims that God created all things at the beginning of time, but at the end of time he was born as the God of Destruction and he is traveling backwards in time. Shimaki reveals that he planned to use his omnipotence to help the world, so he rejects Animus' offer. He also reveals the wish he made after his first one was rejected was the power to make golems, which he summons to kill Animus. He is stopped by Taiyou, who is already Animus' ally. Awakening, Shimaki keeps what he knows a secret, hoping there is still a chance to become an omnipotent God.
9	"Akitani Inatika"; Transliteration: "Akitani Inachika" (Japanese: 秋谷稲近)	Yui Kōbe	Yūichirō Momose	Ice Mugino	3 September 2022
To prepare for battle, Yuuhi begins digging pitfall traps in the forest. In one hole, he discovers a package from the Swordfish Knight Akitani Inatika. Inatika claimed to have been born 500 years ago and gained omniscience. Later, he began teaching apprentices who all died of old age. Eventually, he trained Yukimachi and Subaru, whom he had foreseen would be his final apprentices. After training them for eight years, he lost his omniscience but gained the title of Swordfish Knight and his swordfish partner Zan Qamar. After passing on his last lesson to Yukimachi and Subaru, he left the biography for Yuuhi to find and died fighting a golem the very next day. The last page warns Yuuhi that somehow Anima needs Yuuhi to ensure his victory over Samidare. Mikazuki is curious about Inatika and Subaru explains they were present when the golem killed him. It was their first real fight but seeing Inatika hurt allowed them to develop their powers. Inatika died peacefully, knowing they were strong enough to survive without him. All the knights suddenly sense a great danger as Anima unleashes his latest golem, Hekatombaion.
10	"Hekatombaion and the Beast Knights"; Transliteration: "Hekatonbaion to Kemono no Kishidan" (Japanese: ヘカトンバイオンと獣の騎士団)	Takahiro Ono	Yūichirō Momose	Yutaka Kagawa	10 September 2022
Mikazuki demands the knights go to summer training at the beach, though everyone ends up just having fun instead. Yuuhi sees Samidare has learned to use her powers to walk on water. She has been experimenting hoping to understand why all the knights' powers seem so random. Yayoi considers confessing to Yuuhi when she overhears him and Samidare discuss Samidare's intention to destroy the world. Yayoi decides to keep what she heard a secret. Later, Hekatombaion finally appears and all the knights gather to fight it, including Taiyo who is surprised Shimaki has kept his loyalty to Animus a secret. Animus abruptly appears and steals Yuuhi and Samidare, claiming Hekatombaion is a gift for the amateur knights only. Animus reveals that Anima, the spirit inside Samidare, is actually his twin sister and she created the knights to fight him. Yuuhi realizes Anima must be the one preventing Animus from using the hammer. Samidare attacks Animus, distracting Hekatombaion. Shimaki summons his own golem inside of Hekatombaion, damaging his body before he is destroyed by a combination of everyone's powers. Animus disappears again and the knights plan a seafood victory feast.
11	"The Asahina Family"; Transliteration: "Asahina-ke" (Japanese: 朝日奈家)	Shunji Yoshida	Yūichirō Momose	Minoru Yamaoka	17 September 2022
Yuuhi trains with Mikazuki and Shimaki. Later that day, Samidare decides to run away to Yuuhi's in order to avoid her mother. As such, Hisame has Yuuhi stay over at her house. The next morning, Yuuhi continues his training. That night, Hisame reveals to Yuuhi the real reason why Samidare is avoiding their mother. She also reveals she is unsure how Samidare truly feels about her. The next day, Hisame and Samidare finally have a heartfelt conversation. Once Yuuhi convinces Samidare to head home, she has an emotional reunion with her mother. Yuuhi later decides to call his grandfather. Meanwhile, Animus senses Anima's presence.
12	"The Spirit Anima and the Beast Knights"; Transliteration: "Seirei Anima to Kemono no Kishidan" (Japanese: 精霊アニマと獣の騎士団)	Kiyoto Nakajima	Yūichirō Momose	Ryōji Fujiwara	24 September 2022
Anima accompanies Samidare to meet Yuuhi. Later that day, she summons the knights to her location where she uses her power to transform Dance Dark into the Mythical Beast Knight, Unicorn. When they return home, Animus suddenly appears with his latest golem, Metageitnion, which Souichirou is able to hold off with his new Drill Kick ability. Afterwards, Yuuhi is surprised to see Anima inside his apartment. That evening, Yuuhi is digging holes in the mountains when Mikazuki shows up, and they decide to head over to Tarou's. The next morning, Metageitnion returns and proves to be more formidable. However, the knights are eventually able to defeat it.
Special	"Lucifer and the Biscuit Hammer, First Half"; Transliteration: "Hoshi no Samidare Zenpansen" (Japanese: 惑星のさみだれ 前半戦)	N/A	N/A	N/A	1 October 2022
A recap of the first half of the series from Noi's point-of-view.
13	"The Hero, Kusakabe Tarou"; Transliteration: "Yūsha Kusakabe Tarō" (Japanese: 勇者 日下部太朗)	Shigeki Awai	Yūichirō Momose	Koichi Chigira	8 October 2022
A flashback shows that once Tarou and Hanako learned they were Beast Knights, Tarou pondered what wish he wanted to make. That night, after Hanako revealed she wished for a murderer's death, Kil and Lance told Hanako and Tarou this would lead to a karmic death. As such, Tarou planned to use his wish to save Hanako. Back in the present, the knights are training when a goblin army appears to split them up. When the leader, Boedromion, attacks Hanako, Tarou shields and uses his wish to save her. Once the knights reunite, they are grief-stricken over Tarou's death. Yuuhi and Yayoi later agree to fight each other to see who will receive power from Anima.
14	"The Knight, Sorano Hanako"; Transliteration: "Kishi Sorano Hanako" (Japanese: 騎士 宙野花子)	Seung Deok Kim	Yūichirō Momose	Ryōji Fujiwara	15 October 2022
With the power of the Mythical Beast Knight, Invincible on the line, Yayoi defeats Yuuhi. Afterwards, she confesses her feelings to him before they are sent back. The next day, a depressed Yuuhi hangs out with Mikazuki, where they run into a shapeshifting golem disguised as Hangetsu. Elsewhere, Hanako reminisces about Tarou when she runs into said golem. As the knights prepare to fight, Hanako asks Animus to allow her to face Boedromion one-on-one, which he complies. She is finally able to mourn Tarou's death once she wins. Hanako later decides to follow his dream of becoming a chef.
15	"Amamiya Yuuhi and the Shinonome Brothers"; Transliteration: "Amamiya Yūhi to Shinonome Kyōdai" (Japanese: 雨宮夕日と東雲兄弟)	Ho Se Lee	Yūichirō Momose	Minoru Yamaoka	22 October 2022
While Mikazuki is hanging out with Yuuhi, Samidare and Anima, he reminisces about his past. In a flashback, Hangetsu promised he would fight Mikazuki seriously once he reached his age. Mikazuki was then rescued by Hangetsu after he was kidnapped by a gang who was looking for his brother. Six years later, Hangetsu praised Mikazuki for being stronger. Back in the present, Yuuhi and Mikazuki agree to have a rematch. Sometime later, just as the knights are about to fight Pyanepsion, Samidare shows up and easily dispatches it. On the day of their rematch, Anima summons Yuuhi and Mikazuki to her location, which Yuuhi ultimately wins. When the knights reunite, they realize they are entering the final stretch as only three golems remain.
16	"Yukimachi and Subaru"; Transliteration: "Yukimachi to Subaru" (Japanese: 雪待と昴)	Yui Kōbe	Yūichirō Momose	Ryōji Fujiwara	29 October 2022
Yuuhi is at a ramen shop when Yukimachi and Taiyou show up. Later that night, while Yukimachi is training alone, a flashback shows that after she and Subaru learned they were Beast Knights, they wished for each other's happiness. The next day, Taiyou meets up with Pyanepsion just before the other knights arrive. Sometime later, Yuuhi and Yayoi have an awkward moment once they run into each other. Meanwhile, Taiyou is with Maimakterion, the shapeshifting golem. After they part ways, another flashback shows how Taiyou first met Animus. The knights once again encounter Pyanepsion the following morning. Several days later, Mikazuki finds Taiyou in the mountains, while Yukimachi and Saburu run into Yuuhi at the ramen shop. Everyone then hangs out at Yuuhi's apartment. Afterwards, Maimakterion escorts Taiyou home.
17	"The Hero and the Children"; Transliteration: "Hīrō to Kodomotachi" (Japanese: ヒーローと子供達)	Shunji Yoshida	Yūichirō Momose	Ichizō Kobayashi	5 November 2022
The knights are confronted and split-up by Pyanepsion and Maimakterion. When Yuuhi arrives in Mikazuki's location, they decide to find the youngest members. Elsewhere, Yukimachi, Taiyou and an injured Subaru rest in a cave, Yayoi helps Hanako, and Samidare, Souichirou and Shimaki fight Maimakterion. Back in the cave, after Yukimachi confronts Taiyou, he reveals his power to her. To his surprise, he discovers his power can also heal, which he uses on Subaru. They are then rescued by Yuuhi and Mikazuki. Once reunited, the knights realize there is a version of Pyanepsion that is hidden somewhere. At his house, Taiyou finds and defeats Pyanepsion for good. An impressed Anima gives him the power of the Mythical Beast Knight, Hresvelgr as a reward. Later that day, Hanako reassures Taiyou that even if he knew about his healing power beforehand, there was nothing he could have done to save Tarou.
18	"Amamiya Yuuhi and Shinonome Hangetsu"; Transliteration: "Amamiya Yūhi to Shinonome Hangetsu" (Japanese: 雨宮夕日と東雲半月)	Ryō Ōkubo	Yūichirō Momose	Ice Mugino	12 November 2022
During a meeting, Shimaki asks Yuuhi, Souichirou, Yayoi, and Anima's help to come up with new golem designs. Afterwards, he is approached by Animus, Taiyou, and Maimakterion. The next day, Shimaki shows off the golem designed by Yuuhi, which Yayoi inadvertently destroys with ease. He then hangs out with Yuuhi alone. Later that night, Yuuhi is informed of his grandfather's death. While he is asleep, Yuuhi has a final conversation with his grandfather before he teleported to Samidare and Anima's location, where Anima tells him he is about to face a trial. Climbing up a flight of stairs, Yuuhi encounters Hangetsu. Once he defeats Hangetsu, Yuuhi continues on where he has a brief conversation with Inatika. When he finally reaches the top, he sees the Biscuit Hammer in the distance.
19	"Maimakterion and the Beast Knights"; Transliteration: "Maimakuterion to Kemono no Kishidan" (Japanese: マイマクテリオンと獣の騎士団)	Inko Minamino	Noboru Akafuku	Ryōji Fujiwara	19 November 2022
During the battle with the knights, a frustrated Maimakterion gives them an ultimatum: if Shimaki does not produce a worthy golem in ten days, he will kill their friends and family. Two days later, Yuuhi returns home where he sees something that catches his eye. In the mountains, Yayoi invites Yuuhi to train. When they arrive at her house that night, Yayoi eventually reveals she overheard Yuuhi and Samidare's conversation, and she asks that he goes out with her if she thwarts their plan. On the day of the rematch, Shimaki products three different golems that overwhelm Maimakterion. Before Maimakterion dies, Shimaki explains the true nature of golems to him. Following the battle, Anima reveals the other shadow the knights can see is her celestial weapon, the Blues Drive Monster.
20	"Anima and Animus"; Transliteration: "Anima to Animusu" (Japanese: アニマとアニムス)	Seung Deok Kim	Noboru Akafuku	Ryōji Fujiwara	26 November 2022
After the knights train in the mountains to perform a full party Combination Field, a flashback reveals Anima and Animus are orphaned twins from the future. When they were praised for their psychic abilities, Animus developed a god complex before they were sent to the past after he destroyed the Earth with the Biscuit Hammer. During this time, they constantly fought each other over the planet. Sometime later, Anima encountered a young Samidare at the hospital. When they went outside, they met Yuuhi for the first time. Once Samidare returned to the hospital, she wished to see him again and she wanted the Earth. Back in the present, Animus informs the knights he is going to give them a few months' break to prepare for the last battle.
21	"The Last Battle"; Transliteration: "Saigo no Tatakai" (Japanese: 最後の戦い)	Shunji Yoshida	Yūichirō Momose	Ryōji Fujiwara	3 December 2022
A few months later, the knights arrive for the last battle, where Animus separates Samidare and Anima from the group. He then has them fight his final golem, Poseideon. However, the knights easily defeat it when Samidare reunites with them. Following the battle, Anima teleports Yuuhi and Samidare inside the Blues Drive Monster. Once Yuuhi activates it, the Blues Drive Monster takes on the Biscuit Hammer. When it loses, Samidare shatters the Biscuit Hammer using reconstructed fragments of the Blues Drive Monster. Back on Earth, Animus challenges the other knights to a fight.
22	"Lucifer and the Biscuit Hammer Part 1"; Transliteration: "Hoshi no Samidare" (Japanese: 惑星のさみだれ)	Ho Se Lee	Yūichirō Momose	Koichi Chigira	10 December 2022
While Animus is fighting the other knights, Anima determines that he has erected a barrier to keep Samidare away. After a while, Animus approaches Taiyou to retrieve the power he lent him. However, Taiyou uses his wish in order to prevent this from happening. Once Samidare finally breaks the barrier, Anima mortally wounds a weaken Animus. They then have a final conversation before he dies. After Anima mourns his death, she tells the other knights they have to deal with Samidare now that her and Animus' tale is complete. Yuuhi challenges them on Samidare's behalf.
23	"Lucifer and the Biscuit Hammer Part 2"; Transliteration: "Wakusei no Samidare" (Japanese: ほしのさみだれ)	Ho Se Lee	Yūichirō Momose	Koichi Chigira	17 December 2022
Souichirou, Yayoi, and Hanako take on Yuuhi. When they use up their stamina, Yuuhi reveals that due to his love for Samidare, he will be the one who stops her. Knowing this day would come, an elated Samidare reminisces about the time she has spent with everyone. During the fight, Yuuhi and Noi surprisingly gain the power of Invincible. Meanwhile, Anima reveals Samidare's illness and true motive for wanting to destroy the Earth to the rest of the knights. As a result, they resolve to save her. After a while, Samidare decides to complete her objective. However, Yuuhi is finally able to stop her once he is assisted by everyone else.
24	"That Which Ends and That Which Continues"; Transliteration: "Owaru Mono to Tsudzuku Mono" (Japanese: 終わるものと続くもの)	Ho Se Lee	Yūichirō Momose	Koichi Chigira	24 December 2022
Once Samidare is welcomed back with open arms, Anima and the familiars bid farewell to the knights. However, she briefly allows Noi and Muu to stay behind for Yuuhi and Mikazuki's rematch. As the match lasts into the night, Noi and Muu say their goodbyes. After Mikazuki finally wins, the knights part ways. Ten years later, Yuuhi is teleported to Anima's location. There, she explains the basis for the familiars, what century she and Animus are from, and that they are the descendants of Hangetsu and Hisame. In turn, Yuuhi reveals he became a detective, Souichirou runs a detective agency, Mikazuki and Subaru are possibly dating, Hanako became a chef, Yayoi and Shimaki got married, Taiyou and Yukimachi are dating, and Samidare is cured. When Yuuhi returns home, he and Samidare head to a reunion with the other knights.

== Reception ==
=== Manga ===
In 2011, the series was nominated for the 42nd Seiun Awards in the comics category.

Reviewing the first omnibus volume for Anime News Network, Rebecca Silverman commented that the story "takes a while to hit its stride, but when it does, putting it down becomes difficult", writing that "underneath the goofy start and typically comedic devices of absurdly powerful girls and talking animals, Lucifer and the Biscuit Hammer is hiding a very dark story" which makes it "feel very different from most of the other series currently available in English." She gave it an overall grade of B. Silverman would later list the series as the runner-up for the "Best Reworking of an Old Genre" spot on her 2015 manga retrospective article for Anime News Network. Charlie Jane Anders of io9 placed the series at number ten on her list of "10 Heroic Prophecies That Didn't Turn Out The Way the Heroes Expected".

By 2022, the manga had sold 650,000 physical copies.
