= Kamunagara =

Japanese manga series

- Kamunagara: Rebirth of the Demonslayer
- First tankōbon volume cover

カムナガラ
- Genre: Action; Supernatural horror
- Manga
- Written by: Hajime Yamamura
- Published by: Shōnen Gahosha
- English publisher: NA: Media Blasters
- Magazine: Young King OURs
- Original run: 1999 – 2006
- Volumes: 10 + gaiden

Kamunagara: Rebirth of the Demonslayer (Japanese: カムナガラ, Hepburn: Kamunagara) is a Japanese manga series written and illustrated by Hajime Yamamura. It was serialized in Shōnen Gahosha's seinen manga magazine Young King OURs from 1999 to 2006, with its chapters collected in ten tankōbon volumes (with an additional gaiden volume). In North America, it was licensed by Media Blasters, who only released the first six volumes.

== Plot ==
Hitaka Kugaya, a former kendo champion who often has a weird recurring dream about a mysterious woman, seems to be the only one in his class who is not interested in Takemi Kanata; he meets her in the music room, while she is playing Beethoven's The Tempest, and she warns him that a tempest is coming.

While going back home from school, he is followed by a dog, and when he gives him something to eat it opens a huge mouth, revealing itself as a demon. At the very last moment, when his hand is already in the dog's mouth, in it appears a sword (the holy sword "Himuka"), which splits the beast in half; after that, Takemi appears, and gets rid of the body with a strange mirror ("mirror of containment"). Crying, she calls him Tohma, and reveals him that the beasts are "invaders from another world", and they're "guardians of the seal": the two worlds are separated by a seal, but the seal gets breached periodically, and the clan of the sword has the mission to stop the invasion.

At first he doubts Takemi's words, as he does not remember anything, but when he comes back home he finds his aunt murdered by a crow demon, and he is badly injured; when he awakes in a hospital, there is already no way out for him.

== Characters ==
Hitaka Kugaya (九谷日高, Kugaya Hitaka)
The main character, reincarnation of the hero Tohma; his parents died in a car accident, and his aunt Sakuri took care of him. Inside him there was a sword made of hihiirokane, a metal capable of concentrating souls to use them as a power source; the heavenly pillar, made of the same material, is the only seal keeping the spirits used for this to come back and get revenge. He loses his right arm to the sword, but the sword itself will regenerate his arm as soon as he learns how to use it properly.
Kanata Takemi (武弥香奈多, Takemi Kanata)
The other main character, reincarnation of the mirror-bearer Tsukumi, Tohma's girlfriend who ended up being manipulated by the intruders and being killed by Tohma while their village was being destroyed. As a child she had a long fever, from which she recovered when the mirror appeared; thanks to the mirror she recovered immediately her memories, but since she was powerless without the sword she was scared of going outside, and locked herself in a shed all day.
Haruka Narugami (鳴神遥日, Narugami Haruka)
Coach of the kendo team, she becomes Hitaka's legal guardian after his aunt's death. Involved somehow by Takemi, she is the one to cut Himuka's bonds saving Hitaka's life, and later discovers she belongs to the clan of the sword too. She develops a "connection" with Yukue Noume because they enjoy the thrill of battle.
Asami Sakura
A young detective who initially investigates on the murder case in Hitaka's house, and suspects the two of them, but she witness a fight with an intruder and becomes their ally. After being removed from the case together with detective Togashi, she continues investigating and eventually receives an anonymous floppy disk containing all the truth behind the hihiirokane.
Kiju Togashi
An experienced detective, he understands immediately the murder case at Hitaka's house is not going to do any good to him. After being hurt and removed from the case by the agents of the guardianship post, he discreetly continues to help them.
Tsubasa Saino (斎野翼紗, Saino Tsubasa)
The leader of the intruders; he is related to Hitaka since ancient times, and his hatred towards him is endless. Deluded by the fact that Hitaka still has not regained memory of his previous life, he repeatedly provokes him, until Himuka goes berserk and Hitaka loses his right arm. When Tsubasa reverses the power of the mirror to summon a powerful creature to fight him, Hitaka finally regains his memory and for the first time is able to injure him.
Yukue Noume (納見行依, Noume Yukue)
Tsubasa's right hand man; he seems to have greater powers than his, and he is very skilled with the sword. He shows an interest in Haruka Narugami because they are 'the same kind of person' and wishes to fight her.
Mizuha Kagusa (春日瑞葉, Kagusa Mizuha)
Director of ceremony, agent of the guardianship post. Daughter of the agency's chief director, she has the ability to attune herself to the vibrations of the heavenly pillar, absorbing them into her body. She is hinted to have an attraction towards Amano but feels that she must stay on guard around him due to the fact that he feels dangerous.
Takashi Amano (天野崇史, Amano Takashi)
Director of ceremony, agent of the guardianship post. He seems to have an agenda on his own, to avenge his grandfather and also for his own interests. He seems to care for Mizuha Kagusa but it is unsure whether this is his true feelings or also a part of his plans.

== Publication ==
Written and illustrated by Hajime Yamamura, Kamunagara was serialized in Shōnen Gahosha's seinen manga magazine Young King OURs from 1999 to 2006. Shōnen Gahosha collected its chapters in ten tankōbon volumes, released from August 2000 to April 2006; an additional gaiden (numbered 0) volume was released in April 2005.

In North America, the manga was licensed by Media Blasters; they only released the first six volumes from October 2004 to September 2006, before announcing in 2007 that they had canceled its publication.

== See also ==
- Kamisama Dolls, another manga series by the same author
