= Planet With =

Japanese manga and anime series

- Promotional art for the anime

プラネット・ウィズ (Puranetto Wizu)
- Genre: Mecha
- Created by: Satoshi Mizukami; Bandai Namco Arts; J.C.Staff
- Manga
- Written by: Satoshi Mizukami
- Published by: Shōnen Gahōsha
- English publisher: NA: Crunchyroll Manga
- Magazine: Young King OURs
- Original run: April 28, 2018 – July 29, 2022
- Volumes: 8
- Anime television series
- Directed by: Youhei Suzuki
- Written by: Satoshi Mizukami
- Music by: Kōhei Tanaka
- Studio: J.C. Staff
- Licensed by: Crunchyroll (streaming); NA: Discotek Media (home video)
- Original network: Tokyo MX, MBS, BS11, AT-X
- Original run: July 8, 2018 – September 23, 2018
- Episodes: 12
- icon

Planet With (Japanese: プラネット・ウィズ, Hepburn: Puranetto Wizu) is a Japanese multimedia franchise by Satoshi Mizukami. Mizukami launched a manga series published in Shōnen Gahōsha's Young King OURs from April 2018 to July 2022. An anime television series by J.C.Staff aired from July to September 2018.

== Plot ==
Sōya Kuroi lives with a large cat-like creature called Sensei and a happy maid named Ginko. One day, strange floating beasts appear in the sky above Japan, and conventional weapons are useless against them, until seven men and women transform into powerful weapons and destroy them. Sōya finds himself pressed into battle, fighting not against the beasts, but against the seven heroes instead, as he becomes an unwitting pawn in an interstellar war that has come to Earth.

== Characters ==
Sōya Kuroi (黒井 宗矢, Kuroi Sōya)
Voiced by: Atsushi Abe
A high school-aged boy with amnesia who can barely remember what happened further than one year ago. He eventually regains some of his memories and realizes the members of Grand Paladin are using similar powers to the ones that led to the destruction of his home planet, Sirius, from which he is the only survivor. A running gag is that he is kept from eating meat, either intentionally by Ginko or accidentally by others.
Ginko Kuroi (黒井 銀子, Kuroi Ginko)
Voiced by: Shiori Izawa
A maid living with Soya who assists their Sensei. She is later revealed to be the Princess of the planet Riel who was saved by Sensei after being attacked by Sirius soldiers. Despite this, she came to Sirius with Sensei and rescued Sōya, adopting him. Ginko has various psychic powers.
Sensei (先生) / Rashaverak (ラシャヴェラク)
Voiced by: Rikiya Koyama
A large purple cat who usually speaks in meows that Ginko translates. Revealed to be a leader of the Pacifist Faction of the Nebulans who tried to save the planet Sirius before it was destroyed. Capable of transforming into a small mech that Soya pilots after being swallowed by him. Sensei also has a spaceship that looks like his normal form, but at a massive scale. His other name, Rashaverak, appears to be a reference to one of the overlords from the novel Childhood's End.
Nozomi Takamagahara (高天原 のぞみ, Takamagahara Nozomi)
Voiced by: Sayaka Harada
The representative of Soya's class and member of the school's Occult Research Club. Constantly referred to as "Glasses" (Megane-san) because Soya can't remember her real name.
Hideo Torai (虎居 英雄, Torai Hideo)
Voiced by: Yūichirō Umehara
Hideo is former firefighter who quit to join Grand Paladin. He lost his mother in a fire in middle school and joined the fire department after high school.
Miu Inaba (因幡 美羽, Inaba Miwa)
Voiced by: Hitomi Ōwada
Miu is a young Judoka who is best friends with Harumi, hoping to one day be as strong as her. Member of Grand Paladin.
Harumi Kumashiro (熊代 晴海, Kumashiro Harumi)
Voiced by: Mai Fuchigami
Young Judoka and Miu's classmate who wants to be pampered by Miu. Member of Grand Paladin.
Judgment (Seigi) Nezuya (根津屋 正義, Nezuya Seigi)
Voiced by: Shinsuke Sugawara
Graduate of Soya's highschool who occasionally visits the Occult Research Club. Adds dramatic flair to most of his actions and claims his name (Seigi) is because his father wanted him to be a lawyer, though in truth his family is a long line of sake brewers. Member of Grand Paladin.
Benika Takatori (鷹取 紅華, Takatori Kureha)
Voiced by: Shizuka Ishigami
A redheaded woman and former junior police detective. Member of Grand Paladin who later joins the Sealing Faction.
Yōsuke Hitsujitani (羊谷 葉介, Hitsujitani Yōsuke)
Voiced by: Kazuyuki Okitsu
Member of Grand Paladin who later joins the Sealing Faction with Benika. The younger brother of the late police detective who was Benika's partner.
Takashi Ryūzōji (竜造寺 隆, Ryūzōji Takashi)
Voiced by: Kenji Nomura
The leader of Grand Paladin and arguably their strongest member. Suspected of being the reincarnation of the dragon that destroyed Sirius by the Generalissimo.
Kogane Shiraishi (白石 こがね, Shiraishi Kogane)
Voiced by: Saori Gotō
Takeshi's secretary within Grand Paladin who seems to know more about the Nebula Weapons than she lets on. Later revealed to be a Rielian like Ginko and a member of the Sealing Faction who translates the Generalissimo's barks into speech and pilots his mech form.
Takezō Ryūzōji (竜造寺 岳蔵, Ryūzōji Takezō)
Voiced by: Motomu Kiyokawa
Takashi's father and another Member of Grand Paladin. Has a love of meat and is infamous for visiting steakhouses and spending lavishly on meat there. Claimed to have found Takashi when he landed on Earth from space and raised him as his own son, but played it off as a joke to Yosuke.
Generalissimo (閣下, Kakka) / Karellen (カレルレン, Kareruren)
Voiced by: Norio Wakamoto
A big white dog-like creature who leads the Sealing Faction of the Nebulans. Similar to Sensei, he can turn into a larger, armored version of himself after swallowing Kogane. He also rides a gigantic spaceship that looks like himself. Like Sensei, his other name appears to be a reference to one of the overlords from Childhood's End.

== Production ==
Shōnen Gahōsha first hinted at the project on November 30, 2017, when they announced that Satoshi Mizukami would be writing a new "large-scale" science fiction series in April after his current manga finished serialization. The series was officially announced on March 23, 2018. Mizukami had begun work on the series four years prior, and has drawn 1,074 pages of storyboards for the project, in addition to writing both the manga and the anime.

== Media ==
=== Manga ===
A manga version by Satoshi Mizukami was serialized in Shōnen Gahōsha's seinen manga magazine Young King OURs from April 28, 2018, to July 29, 2022. Shōnen Gahōsha collected its chapters in eight tankōbon volumes, released from July 30, 2018, to August 30, 2022.

The manga was published in English by Crunchyroll Manga.

=== Anime ===
The anime television series was written and storyboarded by Mizukami and directed by Youhei Suzuki, with animation by J.C.Staff. Kazunori Iwakura adapted Mizukami's character designs for animation. Yoshitsune Izuna and Yasuyoshi Uetsu were the series' mechanical designers, and Tsuyoshi Isomoto was the prop designer. Yoshikazu Iwanami was the sound director. Kōhei Tanaka composed the series' music. Minami performed the opening theme song "One Unit", while Mai Fuchigami performed the ending theme.

The series aired from July 8 to September 23, 2018, and was broadcast on Tokyo MX, MBS, and BS11. The series was simulcasted by Crunchyroll.

No.	Title (Note: All English titles are taken from Crunchyroll.)	Original release date
1	"Light, Seven Flashes" "Hikari, Nana sen" (光，七閃)	July 8, 2018
Soya is an ordinary high school boy, aside from the fact that he lives with a large cat-like creature named Sensei and a happy green-haired maid named Ginko. One day at school, his city is under attack by a large UFO that appears to be an oddly-designed stuffed animal. All conventional weapons are useless against it, and it attacks by trapping the minds of anyone who gets close to it in a pleasant dreamlike state. Seven men and women appear nearby, transforming into giant armored beasts and attack the UFO. As Hideo Torai reaches the core of the beast, the UFO defends itself by showing him a peaceful dream from his past. Hideo realizes that the visions aren't real and destroys the UFO from the inside. However, upon landing away from his comrades, Hideo finds himself facing a stranger who asks for his power, who happens to be Soya wearing a mask. Soya then gets swallowed inside Sensei's body as he transforms into a small, cat-like mech. He then defeats a depleted Hideo and steals his power, a tiny jar of stardust hanging from his neck. Some of Soya's memories return, as he realizes Hideo's power is similar to that which led to the destruction of his homeworld, and he swears to take Torai's whole team down.
2	"Nebula Soldiers" "Nebyurasorujā" (ネビュラソルジャー)	July 15, 2018
The members of Grand Paladin, the heroes who destroyed the UFO, gather to discuss what happened in the wake of their last battle. They settle on calling the enemy UFO a "Nebula Weapon," and Hideo's assailant a "Nebula Soldier." However, Hideo's memories of that night are fuzzy and he can't identify his attackers. The leader of Grand Paladin, Takashi Ryūzōji, orders the group's members to pair up so they won't be put out of commission like Hideo. Later that day, another Nebula Weapon appears in the sky, different from the previous one. As Grand Paladin fights it over the ocean, Ginko and Sensei explain to Soya about the Nebulans and the difference between themselves (the Pacifist faction) and the strange weapons (the Sealing faction). Miu Inaba is able to fight through its illusions and destroy the core. Miu then lands back on the island with her best friend Harumi Kumashiro, where the Nebula Soldier demands their power as with Torai. The three of them fight, but Soya is able to break through Miu's armor and Ginko takes her power. Soya ignores Sensei's warning and prepares to fight Harumi as well, but he is suddenly surrounded by the rest of Grand Paladin.
3	"Avenger 1" "Fukushū-sha 1" (復讐者・1)	July 22, 2018
Soya attempts to attack the leader of Grand Paladin in hopes of quickly ending the fight, but Takashi transforms into his own mech and fires a laser that damages Soya and his mech as it carves out a large section of the nearby cliff. Forced to take drastic action, Sensei summons his spaceship, which happens to be a giant mechanical version of himself, and places Soya inside. Soya has an odd dream where he sees Sensei arguing with a white, dog-like creature over the path of the Nebulans and his own fate. Soya then wakes up in his room, having been unconscious for three days. Soya quickly returns to school and gets roped into the school's Occult Research Club with Nozomi and a slightly flamboyant graduate named Seigi. Suddenly, the island is again under attack by a Nebula Weapon, this time in the form of a bunch of upside-down babies. Harumi leads the charge in this attack, and after the team locates the core, she rushes in to destroy it, hoping to avenge Miu's defeat. She manages to destroy the core, though after the explosion, Seigi appears unconscious and unarmored.
4	"Avenger 2" "Fukushū-sha 2" (復讐者・2)	July 29, 2018
Seigi is shown to have given in to the Nebula Weapon's attack, choosing to remain inside his dream. Meanwhile, Harumi spots the Nebula Soldier and challenges him to a 1-on-1 battle. Soya destroys Harumi's arms and tries to finish her quickly, but Harumi refuses to lose in front of Miu, and becomes increasingly enraged, until she loses control and her armor transforms into a powerful dragon. Her attack ends up hitting the middle of the city nearby, and almost destroying her teammates. Benika and Yosuke reluctantly team up with the Nebula Soldier to pacify Harumi before she destroys any more innocents, but her dragon form is too powerful, even for Soya and Sensei's "Cat Doping" powered form. Miu tries to bring Harumi back to normal, and Ginko helps her reach Harumi, shattering the dragon form. Ginko manages to steal Harumi's power in the chaos, but Harumi and Miu are fine with the result. Later, Soya and Sensei are both hungover from the after-effects of the Cat Doping. Elsewhere, Benika demands to know the endgame of Takashi and Grand Paladin. When Takashi responds that he wishes for total, unified justice across the world, Benika thinks he wants world domination and quits the group, leaving her power behind.
5	"Paladin Break 1" "Paradinbureiku 1" (パラディンブレイク・1)	August 5, 2018
At the Occult Research Club, Seigi makes a surprisingly normal appearance compared to his previous one, as he returns some books and plans to move with his family away from the coast with the Nebula Weapons attacking. His subdued demeanor concerns the members of the club. As Soya believes it's related to his failed attack on the previous Nebula Weapon, Nozomi believes that Soya is somehow related to the attacks against the Nebula Weapons. After being chased down, Soya decides to tell Nozomi about his recent past, but then plays it off as a joke. The next day, another Nebula Weapon attacks. Takezo and Yosuke are the only active members of Grand Paladin left, so Takezo goes to fight the weapon and goes to its core as Ginko tells Soya how the Nebula Weapon uses its target's dreams to saps their motivation, essentially sealing them from any greater ambition than their basic needs. Takezo manages to destroy the core, but a large snake emerges from the explosion as a separate part. Soya uses Cat Doping to fly to the scene and cuts down the snake. Afterwards, Takezo challenges Soya to a duel. Meanwhile, Kogane reveals her true allegiance with the "Generalissimo" of the Nebulans' Sealing Faction. The dog-like creature swallows her and turns into a small mech as Takashi prepares to fight her one on one.
6	"Paladin Break 2" "Paradinbureiku 2" (パラディンブレイク・2)	August 12, 2018
Soya manages to defeat Takezo in a duel, convincing both him and Yosuke to give up their power. However, Kogane and Takashi continue fighting in the skies above the town. Kogane argues that humanity is too immature to be left alone without intervention, while Takashi believes the Nebulans are just trying to preserve Earth as a new colony for their own race, as he wishes to rule over Earth himself for the sake of peace. Soya heads off to fight Takashi, but Takezo asks Soya to take his power away and learn to endure injustice rather than work himself to death for his ideal of justice. Ginko enters the cockpit of Sensei with Soya, and they end up fighting against Takashi in his dragon mech. Soya uses all of his strength to prevent the Earth from ending up like Sirius while Takashi tries to destroy the Nebulans, heedless of any collateral damage. After deflecting Takashi's largest attack, Soya destroys his mech and uses his geta to smash Takashi directly in the face, ending the fight. Soya then delivers Takezo's message, but only remembers some of it as Takashi remembers the rest. Soya then briefly sees what appears to be his brother as Takashi turns into dust and crumbles away.
7	"Sirius" "Shiriusu" (シリウス)	August 19, 2018
As Sensei and Soya recover from the fight and the side effects of Cat Doping, Soya sees a flashback of Ginko as the Princess of a planet named Riel, being attacked by soldiers from Sirius, when Sensei steps in to stop them. Suddenly, the Sirius soldiers are called back to their home planet to defend it from a gigantic dragon. Ginko and Sensei head to Sirius as well to stop the dragon from destroying the planet, but arrive too late to save it. However, Ginko manages to save a single boy from the destruction. The dragon is later judged for committing genocide, and the combined Nebulans use their psychic powers to restrain the dragon and seal it in a bubble of time-space forever. Soya later wakes up and heads to school, where Nozomi informs him that most of the families left the area after the battle that occurred over the city. On the roof, a strange green-haired girl claims to be a transfer student named Kogane Shiraishi, and uses hypnotic powers to convince Soya to lead her around the school, but is stopped when she finds that Nozomi is unaffected by the hypnosis. Later that night, Soya finds an alien using the form of his dead brother to warn him that his trials are not over. Soya unleashes his powers and accidentally uncovers a hidden Kogane, standing between Benika and Yosuke, who she has inducted into the Sealing Faction.
8	"Power Is What Dwells Within Your Own Self" "Chikara, onore ni koso yadoru" (力、己にこそ宿る)	August 26, 2018
Benika tries to recruit Torai to the Sealing Faction, but is unsuccessful, as he feels pointless without the vial that gave him powers. Benika responds that the vial was more of a catalyst that awakened psychic powers he already had. Benika returns to the Generalissimo's ship, where Yosuke is somehow able to translate for the dog-like alien as Kogane gets jealous of Soya hanging out with Nozomi and heads to Earth to play around with them. Benika mentions in the past she was a rookie detective on the police force, and her mentor was shot dead trying to arrest a juvenile criminal with a gun. Even though everyone called him a nice kid, the boy said under interrogation that the gun made him feel like a god, so she carried that memory even during her time with Grand Paladin, being afraid that her power would lead her to destroy others. The Generalissimo grants Benika a Nebula Weapon, which she uses immediately to draw out the Nebula Soldier. Meanwhile, Kogane's disguise is unearthed when she tries to seduce Soya. Soya insists he doesn't have a reason to fight anymore, despite Kogane, Sensei, and Ginko trying to convince him otherwise. Suddenly, Torai appears, and decides to take on Kogane himself, transforming into his armored form without the use of the vial he had before. As he fights Kogane and then destroys the Nebula Weapon in the sky, a representative from the "People of Paradise" appears before Soya in the form of his brother again. The alien tells Soya that the real dragon is sleeping on the dark side of the Moon, and he needs Soya to finish it off for good.
9	"Messenger of Awakening" "Mezame no shisha" (目覚めの使者)	September 2, 2018
With Benika's armor destroyed in battle before the Sealing Device, she ends up exposed to its attack, and stays in her dream. Meanwhile, Soya falls into depression and wonders if he should just let the Sealing Faction or the dragon destroy him. Yosuke takes the last Sealing Weapon from the Generalissimo, and heads back to Earth feeling he has nothing left after Benika's sealing. He then combines his own armor with the Sealing Weapon to create a weapon that easily overpowers Torai, Miu, and Harumi before he begins Sealing the Earth. Everyone on Earth except Soya stops in place, trapped in their own dreamworlds. The image of Soya's brother appears next to Soya again, and Soya asks the alien to unseal everyone in exchange for his cooperation in fighting the dragon. The People of Paradise accept, and allow Soya's voice to reach into everyone's dream and break the seal. Torai, Miu, and Harumi jump back in to fight Yosuke, along with Soya who reveals his true identity to the group. Soya, Sensei, and Ginko then activate their spaceship's battle mode and defeat Yosuke. As Yosuke is saved by a reawakened Benika, Soya challenges the Generalissimo to a final duel.
10	"Karellen and Rashaverak" "Kareruren to rashavu~eraku" (カレルレンとラシャヴェラク)	September 9, 2018
11	"Azrabarakura" "Asurabarakura" (アスラバラクラ)	September 16, 2018
12	"Behold, The Universe is Filled With Blessings" "Miro, uchū wa shukufuku ni michite iru" (見ろ、宇宙は祝福に満ちている)	September 23, 2018

== Reception ==
The Planet With manga series was nominated for the 54th Seiun Award in the Best Comic category in 2023.
