= How to Look for Something Lost =

Japanese manga series

- First tankōbon volume cover

ナナシ～ナくしたナにかのさがシかた～ (Nakushita Nanika no Sagashikata)
- Genre: Horror
- Manga
- Written by: Harumi Fujino
- Illustrated by: Shuu Katayama
- Published by: Shōnen Gahōsha
- Imprint: Young King Comics
- Magazine: Young King OURs
- Original run: September 29, 2018 – December 28, 2021
- Volumes: 5

How to Look for Something Lost (Japanese: ナナシ～ナくしたナにかのさがシかた～, Hepburn: Nakushita Nanika no Sagashikata) is a Japanese manga series adapted from Nanashi Series online occult horror stories written by Harumi Fujino and illustrated by Shuu Katayama. It was serialized in Shōnen Gahōsha's seinen manga magazine Young King OURs from September 2018 to December 2021, with its chapters have been collected in five tankōbon volumes as of February 2022.

== Media ==
=== Manga ===
Adapted from Nanashi Series online occult horror stories written by Harumi Fujino and illustrated by Shuu Katayama, How to Look for Something Lost started in Shōnen Gahōsha's seinen manga magazine Young King OURs on September 29, 2018. The manga finished serialization in the magazine on December 28, 2021. Shōnen Gahōsha collected its chapters in five tankōbon volumes, released from May 30, 2019, to February 9, 2022.

==== Volumes ====
No.	Japanese release date	Japanese ISBN
1	May 30, 2019	978-4-7859-6446-7
2	January 30, 2020	978-4-7859-6595-2
3	September 30, 2020	978-4-7859-6761-1
4	September 30, 2022	978-4-7859-6922-6
5	February 9, 2022	978-4-7859-6595-2
