= Gaku Miyao =

Japanese manga artist (born 1959)

Gaku Miyao (宮尾 岳, Miyao Gaku; born May 21, 1959) is a Japanese manga artist known for his work on the series Kazan. He began his career as an animator, but started creating manga so he could explore the storytelling process on his own. His signature titles include Kazan, Cycle Shop Aoba, Devil Hunter Yohko, and Shichimi Nadeshiko Unon. Comics One published the Kazan series.
