= Satoshi Mizukami =

Japanese manga artist

- Born: February 20, 1980 (age 46); Osaka, Osaka, Japan
- Occupation: Manga artist
- Writing career
- Period: 2002–present
- Genres: Action, adventure, comedy, sci-fi
- Subjects: Seinen manga, shōnen manga
- Notable works: Lucifer and the Biscuit Hammer; Sengoku Youko; Spirit Circle; Planet With

Satoshi Mizukami (水上 悟志, Mizukami Satoshi; born February 20, 1980) is a Japanese manga artist. He is best known as the creator of Lucifer and the Biscuit Hammer, Sengoku Youko, Spirit Circle, and the anime television series Planet With. His former assistants include Kenta Ishizaka, Akira Sagami, and Seto Ichiri.

== Biography ==
Mizukami was born in Osaka on February 20, 1980. He decided to become a manga artist at a young age and began drawing manga while in middle school. During this time, he was influenced by the anime Mashin Hero Wataru, the manga Ghost Sweeper Mikami, and light novels such as Slayers. Later influences include Gainax works, particularly FLCL. Mizukami graduated from the Osaka Technical School of Integrative Design's Department of Manga. In 2004, during the serialization of Angel Onayami Sōdanjo, he moved to the Kanto region and established a workplace in Funabashi, Chiba Prefecture where he currently resides. Mizukami often depicts himself as a frog or wearing a frog mask.

== Works ==
=== Manga ===
Title	Publication Date
Gekogeko (げこげこ)	March 2002 – September 30, 2004
Sanjin Sadō (散人左道)	September 30, 2002 – May 29, 2004
Angel Onayami Sōdanjo (エンジェルお悩み相談所 Enjeru Onayami Sōdanjo)	August 7, 2004 – August 4, 2006
Lucifer and the Biscuit Hammer (惑星のさみだれ Hoshi no Samidare)	June 30, 2005 – August 30, 2010
Piyopiyo (ぴよぴよ)	December 28, 2005 – November 18, 2006
Psycho Staff (サイコスタッフ Saiko Staffu)	November 24, 2006 – May 24, 2007
Sengoku Youko (戦国妖狐 Sengoku Yōko)	December 28, 2007 – May 20, 2016
Trigun: Multiple Bullets (トライガン・マルチプルバレッツ Toraigan Maruchipuru Barettsu)	December 28, 2011
Brother Complex Anthology: Liqueur (ブラコンアンソロジー Liqueur Burakon Ansorojī Liqueur)	February 1 – August 11, 2012
Uchū Taitei Ginga Thunder no Bōken (宇宙大帝ギンガサンダーの冒険 Uchū Taitei Ginga Sandā no Bōken)	May 30, 2012
Spirit Circle (スピリットサークル Supiritto Sākuru)	May 30, 2012 – March 30, 2016
My Road to Mangaka (Temp.) (おれのまんが道（仮）Ore no Manga Michi (Kari))	2013
Wandering World (放浪世界 Hōrō Sekai)	May 20, 2014 – October 5, 2017
Matsuri Connection (まつりコネクション Matsuri Konekushon)	January 22, 2015
Too Late for Fantasy (今更ファンタジー Imasara Fantajī)	March 22, 2017
Nihonmatsu Siblings and the Adventure of Wooden Valley (二本松兄妹と木造渓谷の冒険 Nihonmatsu Kyōdai to Mokuzō Keikoku no Bōken)	June 30 – November 30, 2017
Planet With (プラネット・ウィズ Puranetto Wizu)	April 28, 2018 – July 29, 2022
World End Solte (最果てのソルテ Saihate no Sorute)	January 20, 2020 – Present
Climax Necromance (クライマックスネクロマンス Kuraimakkusu Nekuromansu)	January 30, 2024 – Present

=== Anime ===
Title	Year	Positions
Planet With (プラネット・ウィズ Puranetto Wizu)	July 8 – September 23, 2018	Original creator, storyboard, original character design, script
Lucifer and the Biscuit Hammer (惑星のさみだれ Hoshi no Samidare)	July 9 – December 24, 2022	Original creator, script
Sengoku Youko (戦国妖狐 Sengoku Youko)	January 11 – December 26, 2024	Original creator
Spirit Circle (スピリットサークル Supiritto Sākuru)	December 2026 – scheduled	Original creator
