= Defense Devil =

Japanese manga series

- First tankōbon volume cover
- Manga
- Written by: Youn In-wan
- Illustrated by: Yang Kyung-il
- Published by: Shogakukan
- Imprint: Shōnen Sunday Comics
- Magazine: Weekly Shōnen Sunday
- Original run: April 8, 2009 – June 8, 2011
- Volumes: 10
- icon

Defense Devil (stylized in all caps) is a Japanese manga series written by Youn In-wan and illustrated by Yang Kyung-il. It was serialized by Shogakukan in Weekly Shōnen Sunday from April 2009 to June 2011. The story is about a banished demon named Kucabara who decides to become a Defense Devil in order to gather up dark matter which he needs to regain his devil powers again.

== Story ==
Kucabara was recently banished and stripped of his powers. In order to regain his powers, he needs Dark Matter (ダークマター, Daaku Mataa) which is found from human sinners. He decides to become a Defense Devil in order to get dark matter. A Defense Devil's duty is to prove the innocence of human sinner of his or her crime; once that is done, a Defense Devil shall be allowed to take the sinner's dark matter. Kucabara then must prove the sinner's innocence before a shinigami (死神, lit. Death God) takes the sinner to hell. One day, Kucabara's friend Funi arrives and tells him the demon world is in dishevel and Kucabara must return to save it. Kucabara, with the aid of his friends, Bichula the dragon demon and a female exorcist named Idamaria, infiltrates the demon world; they discover the source of the chaos to be Kucabara's younger brother, Legato, and set out to confront him. Eventually, they realize Legato was gathering energy to destroy the angels who reign control over Hell. After confronting Elimona and the angels, Kucabara is called by God and is taken to heaven. Kucabara returns to his friends and the series ends with him recruiting his friends to defend God who has been betrayed by his angels.

== Production ==
Yang Kyung-Il and Youn In-Wan first created a one-shot of Defense Devil titled "Akuma Bengoshi Kukabara" (悪魔弁護士 Kukabara, lit. "Devil Advocate Kukabara") for a 2008 issue of Sunday GX. After the release of the first tankōbon volume, the authors began a blog on the Shōnen Sunday website about their progress with the series. A contest was held in celebration of the second tankōbon volume where 100 winners are given autographed artwork by the authors.

== Characters ==
Mephisto Barto Dertov Reffertlark Kucabara (メフィスト・バルト・デルトフ・レファート・ラルク・クカバラ, Mefusuto Baruto Derutofu Refāto Raruku Kukabara)
Kucabara is the protagonist of Defense Devil and the third son of the great demon king. After being stripped of his powers, Kucabara becomes a lawyer in order to make a living. His duty as hell's lawyer is to prove an unknown soul's innocence to prevent them from going to hell. Before he was stripped of his powers Kucabara was said to have the strongest dark matter in the demon world. Also Kucabara has openly expressed his feelings for Idamaria by proclaiming his love to her.
Bichula (ビチュラ)
Bichula is the formerly strongest warrior of the famous dragon family, which was massacred by the kingdom of the underworld. He was stripped of his powers and banished from the demon world along with Kucabara.
Elimona (エリモナー, Erimonā)
Elimona is a fallen angel from heaven who runs a store in Event Horizon, a land between the real and demon worlds. She frequently cosplays and tries to seduce Bchuler and Kucabara, much to their chagrin. However, she is often turned to for help or advice by the protagonists. She later reveales to Idamaria that she is an angel and wanted to destroy the demon world by releasing the goddess Lilith.
Idamaria (イダマリア)
Idamaria is a nun who specializes in demon exorcism and is romantically interested in Kucabara. It is later revealed that Idamaria is able to produce dark matter from her body. Her name before entering the church was Catherine.
Selma (セルマ, Seruma)
Selma is a priest in charge of the institution where Idamaria lives. He is the one who trained Idamaria and Kucabara to cooperate with each other in order for them to open a portal to the demon world. A powerful exorcist, he is acquainted with Elimona and obtains information about the demon world through her. His name before dying was Kanto.
Garypeter Sugal (ゲーリーピーター・シュガル, Gērīpītā Shugaru)
A proud, apathetic, and analytic shinigami-ranked demon whose attacks are based on mathematical formulas. He hates underlying schemes and would even revolt against Legato for his ethics. During his stay in the orphanage, he grew fond of a young girl named Jupiter and seeks to free her parents from hell.
Legato (レガート, Regāto)
Legato is the primary antagonist of the series and the fourth son of the great demon king, Kucabara's younger brother. After plotting Kucabara's banishment, he received all of Kucabara's power.
Samus (サムス, Samusu)
The newest member of Kucabara and the others. She was betrayed so many times that she despised relationships and settled out to destroy them. Her original plan was to ruin Kucabara's and Bchuler's relationship and kill them, but she ends up joining their cause. She wields a rifle.
Jupiter (ジュピター, Jupitā)
A little girl taken in by the institution run by Father Seruma when her parents were killed in an accident. She was abducted by the many shinigami who were working for Legato in order to lure Kucabara into going to the demon world. She becomes attached to Sugal after he saves her.

== Publication ==
Defense Devil, written by Youn In-Wan and illustrated by Yang Kyung-Il, was serialized in Shogakukan's Weekly Shōnen Sunday from April 8, 2009, to June 8, 2011. Shogakukan collected its chapters in ten tankōbon volumes, released from August 18, 2009, to September 16, 2011.

=== Volume list ===
No.	Japanese release date	Japanese ISBN
1	August 18, 2009	978-4-09-121727-1
1. "Judgement – 1 Frog Rain" (Judgement – 1 蛙雨, Judgement – 1 Kaerū); 2. "Judgement – 2 Apple Tree" (Judgement – 2 林檎の木, Judgement – 2 Ringo no Ki); 3. "Judgement – 2 Apple Tree 2" (Judgement – 2 林檎の木 2, Judgement – 2 Ringo no Ki 2); 4. "Judgement – 2 Apple Tree 3" (Judgement – 2 林檎の木 3, Judgement – 2 Ringo no Ki 3); 5. "Judgement – 2 Apple Tree 4" (Judgement – 2 林檎の木 4, Judgement – 2 Ringo no Ki 4); 6. "Judgement – 2 Apple Tree 5" (Judgement – 2 林檎の木 5, Judgement – 2 Ringo no Ki 5); 7. "Judgement – 3 Hero" (Judgement – 3 ヒーロー, Judgement – 3 Hirō)
Kucabara recently stripped of his Devil Powers and exiled from the Demon World, becomes a Defense Devil in order to gain dark matter and restore his power. His first client, Tom is in the Event Horizon, a place between the human world and hell. Kucabara must prove Tom's innocence of his crime and return him to the Human World before a Shinigami takes Tom to hell. Kucabara reveals that Tom's motorbike's brakes were malfunctioning causing him to unintentionally injure an elderly woman and thus absolves Tom of his crime and returning him to the human world. Later, a girl named Nami is convicted of suicide after falling in front of a moving train. Kucabara solves the case revealing the Shinigami, Ponsol, to have caused Nami to trip onto the train tracks. Later, Kucabara takes a young man who has committed murder as his client. If Kucabara is unable to prove his innocence, his body will disappear.
2	November 18, 2009	978-4-09-122024-0
8. "Judgement – 3 Hero 2" (Judgement – 3 ヒーロー 2, Judgement – 3 Hirō 2); 9. "Judgement – 3 Hero 3" (Judgement – 3 ヒーロー 3, Judgement – 3 Hirō 3); 10. "Judgement – 3 Hero 4" (Judgement – 3 ヒーロー 4, Judgement – 3 Hirō 4); 11. "Judgement – 3 Hero 5" (Judgement – 3 ヒーロー 5, Judgement – 3 Hirō 5); 12. "Judgement – 3 Hero 6" (Judgement – 3 ヒーロー 6, Judgement – 3 Hirō 6); 13. "Judgement – 3 Hero 7" (Judgement – 3 ヒーロー 7, Judgement – 3 Hirō 7); 14. "Judgement – 3 Hero 8" (Judgement – 3 ヒーロー 8, Judgement – 3 Hirō 8); 15. "Judgement – 4 Mysterious Woman" (Judgement – 4 不思議な彼女, Judgement – 4 Fushigi na Kanojo); 16. "Judgement – 4 Mysterious Woman 2" (Judgement – 4 不思議な彼女 2, Judgement – 4 Fushigi na Kanojo 2); 17. "Judgement-4 Mysterious Woman 3" (Judgement – 4 不思議な彼女 3, Judgement – 4 Fushigi na Kanojo 3)
The man reveals his name to be Paul and tells Kucabara he killed Alice Taylor, a Day Care worker. Kucabara investigates in an attempt to discover the reason why Paul was sent to the Event Horizon instead of a direct trip to hell. The Shinigami Gelipeta Shugarl however, hinders Kucabara's investigation and manages to capture Paul and prepares to send him to hell. Kucabara, upon finding evidence of Paul's innocence, manages to intercept Shugarl. Kucabara reveals a bear was attacking an Alice when Paul readied to fire his rifle at it. Elsewhere though, the children of the Day Care found a rifle and prepared to shoot the bear. The children however hit Alice instead. Paul however decides to erase the children's involvement in the incident and frame himself for the death of Alice. It is revealed Shugarl's involvement created the bear attack and the rifle incident. With the defeat of Shugarl and Paul's decreed innocence, time is reversed restoring Paul and Alice's life. Elsewhere, an Exorcist named Idamaria is assigned to kill Kucabara. Kucabara is then unexpectedly summoned by Idamaria to the human world.
3	December 18, 2009	978-4-09-122062-2
18. "Judgement – 4 Mysterious Woman 4" (Judgement – 4 不思議な彼女 4, Judgement – 4 Fushig na Kanojo 4); 19. "Judgement – 4 Mysterious Woman 5" (Judgement – 4 不思議な彼女 5, Judgement – 4 Fushig na Kanojo 5); 20. "Judgement – 5 Kucabara's Wisdom" (Judgement – 5 クカバラの知恵, Judgement – 5 Kukabara no Chi); 21. "Judgement – 5 Kucabara's Wisdom 2" (Judgement – 5 クカバラの知恵 2, Judgement – 5 Kukabara no Chi 2); 22. "Judgement – 5 Kucabara's Wisdom 3" (Judgement – 5 クカバラの知恵 3, Judgement – 5 Kukabara no Chi 3); 23. "Judgement – 5 Kucabara's Wisdom 4" (Judgement – 5 クカバラの知恵 4, Judgement – 5 Kukabara no Chi 4); 24. "Judgement – 5 Kucabara's Wisdom 5" (Judgement – 5 クカバラの知恵 5, Judgement – 5 Kukabara no Chi 5); 25. "Judgement – 5 Kucabara's Wisdom 6" (Judgement – 5 クカバラの知恵 6, Judgement – 5 Kukabara no Chi 6); 26. "Judgement – 6 The Key to the Demon World" (Judgement – 6 魔界への鍵, Judgement – 6 Makai e no Kagi); 27. "Judgement – 6 The Key to the Demon World 2" (Judgement – 6 魔界への鍵 2, Judgement – 6 Makai e no Kagi 2)
Idamaria engages Kucabara in battle before she is interrupted by demons. Kucabara defeats the demon when it attempts to harm Idamaria and thus forces her to abandon her mission in slaying him. A few days later, Kucabara's friend, Funi, tells Kucabara the demon world is in dishevel and that he must return to save it. A bomb embedded inside Funi detonates and kills him in the explosion. Kucabara reminisces about his past as his life as the prince of the demon world and the day his younger brother Legato stripped of his powers and status and banished him from the kingdom. In the present time, Kucabara is too weak to bypass the demon worlds barrier and seeks assistance from Idamaria.
4	March 18, 2010	978-4-09-122194-0
28. "Judgement – 6 The Key to the Demon World 3" (Judgement – 6 魔界への鍵 3, Judgement – 6 Makai e no Kagi 3); 29. "Judgement – 6 The Key to the Demon World 4" (Judgement – 6 魔界への鍵 4, Judgement – 6 Makai e no Kagi 4); 30. "Judgement – 6 The Key to the Demon World 5" (Judgement – 6 魔界への鍵 5, Judgement – 6 Makai e no Kagi 5); 31. "Judgement – 6 The Key to the Demon World 6" (Judgement – 6 魔界への鍵 6, Judgement – 6 Makai e no Kagi 6); 32. "Judgement – 6 The Key to the Demon World 7" (Judgement – 6 魔界への鍵 7, Judgement – 6 Makai e no Kagi 7); 33. "Judgement – 6 The Key to the Demon World 8" (Judgement – 6 魔界への鍵 8, Judgement – 6 Makai e no Kagi 8); 34. "Judgement – 6 The Key to the Demon World 9" (Judgement – 6 魔界への鍵 9, Judgement – 6 Makai e no Kagi 9); 35. "Judgement – 7 Legato" (Judgement-7 レガート, Judgement – 7 Regaato); 36. "Judgement – 8 Night before Departure" (Judgement – 8 出発前夜, Judgement – 8 Shuppatsu Zenya); 37. "Judgement – 9 Invitation" (Judgement – 9 招待状, Judgement-9 Shootai Joo)
At the Orphanage where Idamaria resides, the priest tells them they must work and train together to infiltrate the demon world. A demon, looking to destroy the orphanage, defeats Kucabara and Idamaria and kidnaps a girl from the orphanage and takes her to the demon world. Kucabara and Idamaria commence training under the tutelage of the head priest. They succeed in their training when they find out Idamaria is able to produce dark matter and fuel Kucabara's powers. Jupiter is returned to the orphanage by Legato who straps a bomb on her. The bomb is dismantled by the Shinigami, Shugarl. Jupiter reveals the cause of distress, she saw her parents burning alive in hell.
5	June 18, 2010	978-4-09-122334-0
38. Judgement – 10 A Promise and a Contract; 39. Judgement – 11 Kucabara's brother 40. Judgement – 12 Man and Woman; 41. Judgement – 13 Zodi; 42. Judgement – 14 Brillheart; 43. Judgement – 15 Kelsa; 44. Judgement – 16 Catfight; 45. Judgement – 17 To Each Their Own Battle; 46. Judgement – 18 Old Woman and Little Girl; 47. Judgement – 19 A Gift From Jupiter
Kucabara, Idamaria, Bichura, and an artificial intelligent car named Zodi, infiltrate hell in order to save Jupiter's parents who are wrongly suffering in hell. They decide to investigate Salamander Hell and discover that the demons there are capturing live humans, instead of sinners, and are torturing them resulting in excess dark matter being created. While Kucabara works on saving the humans, Idamaria engages the Shinigami Brillheart in battle. In the human world, the demons invade the orphanage intent on kidnapping the children and bringing them to Salamander Hell. Idamaria and Brillheart's battle climaxes when Brillheart attempts to absorb the former's life force and causing Idamaria to awaken an unknown power.
6	September 17, 2010	978-4-09-122525-2
48. "Judgement – 20 Advantage and Disadvantage" (Judgement – 20 長所と短所, Judgement – 20 Chousho to Tansho); 49. "Judgement – 21 Wall of Despair" (Judgement – 21 絶望の壁, Judgement – 21 Zetsubou no Kabe); 50. "Judgement – 22 Discord" (Judgement – 22 仲違い, Judgement – 22 Nakatagai); 51. "Judgement – 23 The Friend of the Prince" (Judgement – 23 王子様の友達, Judgement – 23 Oujisama no Tomodachi); 52. "Judgement – 24 Coliseum" (Judgement – 24 闘技場, Judgement – 24 Tougijou); 53. "Judgement – 25 Hole of Distress" (Judgement – 25 痛哭の穴, Judgement – 25 Tsuukoku no Ana); 54. "Judgement – 26 Death of Bichula" (Judgement – 26 ビチュラの死, Judgement – 26 Bichura no Shi); 55. "Judgement – 27 The Promise that We Made that Time" (Judgement – 27 あの時の約束, Judgement – 27 Anotoki no Yakusoku); 56. "Judgement – 28 An Idiot Would Look That Way" (Judgement – 28 あっち向いてホイ, Judgement – 28 Acchi Muitehoi); 57. "Judgement – 29 Idamaria's Dream" (Judgement – 29 イダマリアの夢, Judgement – 29 Idamaria no Yume)
Kucabara manages to free the humans. Idamaria's power has caused her to enter a berserk state and easily defeats Brillheart who proclaims inside Idamaria lies the Goddess of Hell, Lilith. Kucabara attempts to absorb the Dark Matter from Idamaria to return her back to normal by kissing her and succeeds. Kucabara and friends continue their journey through the demon world and come across a giant wall with a single door. The gate keeper commands Kucabara and Bichura to fight to the death in order for him to open the door. Initially declining his offer, Kucabara and Bichura reminisce about how they promised they would remain loyal to each other, and if they need to fight, they will compete with Rock-paper-scissors. While competing, they discover the gatekeeper, is an unnamed female demon who can alter her appearance and are able to pass through the gate when they realize it was unlocked. At an oasis, Idamaria discusses her past and how her parents disappeared.
7	December 17, 2010	978-4-09-122698-3
58. "Judgement – 30 Operation Gasoline Hustle" (Judgement – 30 ガソリン争奪大作戦, Judgement – 30 Gasorin Soudatsu Taisaku); 59. "Judgement – 31 Shugarl and Jupiter" (Judgement – 31 シュガルとジュピター, Judgement – 31 Shugaru to Jupita); 60. "Judgement – 32 The Sky Rock" (Judgement – 32 天空の岩, Judgement – 32 Tenkuu no Iwa); 61. "Judgement – 33 Stone Hell" (Judgement – 33 ストーン・ヘル, Judgement – 33 Sutōn Heru); 62. "Judgement – 34 Gigades Baptism" (Judgement – 34 ギガデスの洗礼, Judgement – 34 Gigadesu no Senrei); 63. "Judgement – 35 Football" (Judgement – 35 ボール遊び, Judgement – 35 Bōruasobi); 64. "Judgement – 36 Children's Room" (Judgement – 36 子供部屋, Judgement – 36 Kodomobeya); 65. "Judgement – 37 To Win Without Fighting" (Judgement – 37 戦わずに勝つ, Judgement – 37 Tatakawa zu ni Katsu); 66. "Judgement – 38 "Y"'s Past" (Judgement – 38 "Y"の過去, Judgement – 38 "Y" no Kako); 67. "Judgement – 39 Samus" (Judgement – 39 サムス, Judgement – 39 Samusu)
The crew pass by a gas station where two demon tribes are fighting over oil. Kucabura resolves the matter after threatening to light a match and setting them all on fire. Meanwhile in the human world, Jupiter heads to town to buy a gift for Shugarl and is kidnapped on the way. Shugarl saves her before he departs for the demon world. Elsewhere, Kucabara runs into Legato who tells him that Gigidas, a demon working for Legato, killed their father, that he will run into Gigidas in his next destination, Stone Hell. Once in Stone Hell, Gigidas attacks them and kidnaps Idamaria. The unnamed female demon appears and offers to give Kucabara a potion that will heal his wounds, but will secretly kill him after some time. The three work together to rescue Idamaria but the female demon betrays them. She reveals her motive is to destroy all bonds since she was shunned by her peers in the past. Kucabara saves her life and she decides to ally herself with them. After taking down stone hell, she gives Kucabara an antidote and reveals her name to be Samus.
8	March 18, 2011	978-4-09-122797-3
68. "Judgement – 40 Oasis" (Judgement – 40 オアシス, Judgement – 40 Oashisu); 69. "Judgement – 41 Calculation Mistake" (Judgement – 41 計算ミス, Judgement – 41 Keisan Misu); 70. "Judgement – 42 Hummingbird" (Judgement – 42 ハミングバード, Judgement – 42 Hamingubādo); 71. "Judgement – 43 Kanto" (Judgement – 43 カント); 72. "Judgement – 44 Father Selma" (Judgement – 44 セルマ神父, Judgement – 44 Seruma Shinpu); 73. "Judgement – 45 Phoenix Hell" (Judgement – 45 フェニックス・ヘル, Judgement – 45 Fenikkusu Heru); 74. "Judgement – 46 The Man In The Mirror" (Judgement – 46 鏡の中の男, Judgement – 46 Kyou no Naka no Otoko); 75. "Judgement – 47 Innocence Item" (Judgement – 47 無罪アイテム, Judgement – 47 Muzai Aitemu); 76. "Judgement – 48 Right Turn" (Judgement – 48 右折, Judgement – 48 Usetsu); 77. "Judgement – 49 Shugarl's Sixth Sense" (Judgement – 49 シュガルの勘, Judgement – 49 Shugaru no Kan); 78. "Judgement – 50 Interrogation" (Judgement – 50 尋問, Judgement – 50 Jinmon)
Kucabara and his friends enjoy their day at an oasis. Shugarl returns to the orphanage and attacks a demon giving Jupiter nightmares. The demon reveals he was showing Jupiter her parents burning in hell prompting Shugarl to save them. While Kucabara's companions are asleep, he and Zodi are guided through a storm of tornadoes by his deceased sister Bird. Priest Selma's past is revealed through flashbacks. He was a vigilante who killed criminals and was sent to the electric chair. Elimona signs a contract with him bringing him back to life and teaches him how to slay demons. Selma is introduced to a young Idamaria and ordered by the church order to kill her but instead trains her to be an exorcist to contain the demon inside her. His actions prompted an attack who are unable to defeat him and instead, expel him from the order. Kucabara finds Jupiter's parents enslaved by a demon named Phoenix. Phoenix demands Kucabara to find proof of Jupiter's parent's innocence. While Kucabara investigates, his companions and Shugarl are forced to fight Legato's demon who plans on taking Jupiter's parents away.
9	July 17, 2011	978-4-09-123002-7
79. Judgement – 51 True Form; 80. Judgement – 52 Subspace; 81. Judgement – 53 Dogfight; 82. Judgement – 54 A Small, Small Love Song; 83. Judgement – 55 Nuisance; 84. Judgement – 56 A Secret Between The Two Of Us; 85. Judgement – 57 Elimona's Confession; 86. Judgement – 58 Lilith's Resurrection; 87. Judgement – 59 The Mysterious Painting; 88. Judgement – 60 You're the Best, Onii-chan!!; 89. Judgement – 61 Kelia's Recollection
10	September 16, 2011	978-4-09-123245-8
90. Judgement – 62 Collecting Clerk; 91. Judgement – 63 The Pride of a Devil; 92. Judgement – 64 A Promise with Father; 93. Judgement – 65 Kucabara's Smile; 94. Judgement – 66 A Fallen Angel; 95. Judgement – 67 Idamaria and Shugarl; 96. Judgement – 68 If We Join Our Forces; 97. Judgement – 69 The Arrival of the Angels; 98. Judgement – 70 A Month Later...; 99. Judgement – 71 I Miss You...; 100. Judgement – 72 Gran Finale

== Reception ==
Defense Devil has been reviewed in French by staff of Manga Sanctuary, and by Planetebd, and by Manga News. It has also been reviewed in German by SplashComics.
