= Keitaro Takahashi =

Japanese manga artist

Keitarō Takahashi
- Born: 1978 (age 47–48) Isehara, Kanagawa, Japan
- Area: Manga artist
- Notable works: Jormungand, Destro 246

Keitaro Takahashi (高橋 慶太郎, Takahashi Keitarō) is a Japanese manga artist. His major works include Jormugand, a story about a female arms dealer, which ran from 2006 to 2012 in Shogakukan's Monthly Sunday GX magazine, and was made into an anime series. In 2012, he started the manga series Destro 246 which has charted in Oricon's best-sellers.

== Works ==
Title	Year	Notes	Refs
Ordinary±	2002	Published by Shogakukan; Published in 1 volumes	
Jormungand	2006–12	Serialized in Monthly Sunday GX by Shogakukan; Published in 13 volumes	
Jormungand Kessakusen	2012	Serialized in Monthly Sunday GX Chronicle by Shogakukan; Published in 2 volumes	
Destro 246 (デストロ246)	2012–2016	Serialized in Monthly Sunday GX by Shogakukan; Published in 6 volumes	
The Poor, The Holy Ark, and the Rich (貧民、聖櫃、大富豪)	2017–	Serialized in Monthly Sunday GX by Shogakukan; Published in 6 volumes. On hiatus since November 2020.	
Destro 016 (デストロ016)	2021–	Serialized in Monthly Sunday GX by Shogakukan; Prequel to Destro 246	
