= Geobreeders =

Japanese manga series

- First tankōbon volume cover

ジオブリーダーズ (Jioburīdāzu)
- Genre: Action, comedy
- Manga
- Written by: Akihiro Ito
- Published by: Shōnen Gahōsha
- English publisher: NA: CPM Manga; (expired)
- Magazine: Young King OURs
- Original run: 1993 – 2009
- Volumes: 16
- Original video animation

Get Back the Kitty
- Directed by: Yuji Moriyama
- Produced by: Hoko Enomoto
- Written by: Yōsuke Kuroda
- Music by: Kotaro Nakagawa
- Studio: Chaos Project
- Licensed by: NA: Central Park Media; (expired)
- Released: May 21, 1998 – October 21, 1998
- Episodes: 3
- Manga

Atomic Attack
- Written by: Isamu Imakake
- Published by: Shōnen Gahosha
- Magazine: Monthly OURsLITE
- Original run: 2000 – 2001
- Volumes: 1
- Original video animation

Breakthrough
- Directed by: Kiyoshi Fukumoto; Shin Misawa
- Produced by: Shigeru Kitayama
- Written by: Yōsuke Kuroda; Yuji Moriyama
- Music by: Motoyoshi Iwasaki
- Studio: Chaos Project
- Licensed by: NA: Central Park Media; (expired)
- Released: July 26, 2000 – March 23, 2001
- Episodes: 4
- icon

Geobreeders (Japanese: ジオブリーダーズ, Hepburn: Jioburīdāzu) is a Japanese manga series written and illustrated by Akihiro Ito. It was serialized in Shōnen Gahōsha's seinen manga magazine Young King OURs from 1993 to 2009, before entering indefinite hiatus. Its chapters were collected in sixteen tankōbon volumes. A three-episode original video animation (OVA) adaptation, subtitled Get Back the Kitty, was released in 1998, followed by another OVA, subtitled Breakthrough, released from 2000 to 2001. In North America, the manga and the OVAs were formerly licensed by Central Park Media.

== Plot ==
Ayagane City has a phantom cat (also called "bake neko" and "were-cat") problem. A young and overzealous group of entrepreneurs called Kagura Total Security can be hired to combat this problem for the right price when Hound, the official government arm, isn't enough. However, there are plots and subplots floating beneath the surface, both involving Kagura, and the were-cats, led by Kuro-Neko, themselves. Both the manga and the OVAs are heavily action-driven, with gunfights appearing every few chapters.

== Characters ==
Yuka Kikushima (菊島 雄佳, Kikushima Yuka)
Voiced by: Satomi Korogi (Japanese); Debora Rabbai (English)
The chief executive officer of Kagura Total Security (神楽総合警備, Kagura Sōgō Keibi), Yuka possesses a youthful appearance and a flighty, childish demeanor. A casual remark about a 1970s television program reveals she is at least in her twenties. She typically wears tight-fitting clothing, a bandanna, and wields a crossbow. Previously operating under the alias Rika Kikushima, she worked for an earlier iteration of the company, Kagura Co. ver. 3, alongside her older sister Yuma and Luger Ryuu. Yuka later assists Yuma in establishing a new branch, Kagura Co. ver. 5.
Maki Umezaki (梅崎 真紀, Umezaki Maki)
Voiced by: Aya Hisakawa (Japanese); Debora Rabbai (English)
A firearms expert who styles herself as a "mysterious gun person", Maki frequently quotes lines from films starring Akira Kobayashi and Keiichiro Akagi. Her preferred weapon is a Colt revolver, though she is also a highly proficient sniper. As a high school student, she fell in love with "Luger" Ryuu and trained under him to become a marksman. She is known in the underworld as the "Crimson Shooting Star" and is considered either the fastest or second-fastest draw, after Ryuu himself.
Eiko Randou (蘭東 栄子, Randō Eiko)
Voiced by: Yuka Imai (Japanese); Tara Sands (English)
Eiko handles the financing, accounting, and day-to-day operations of Kagura Co., presenting an elegant and sophisticated demeanor. She is also a master of hand-to-hand combat, typically employing a pair of brass knuckles. She possesses a volatile temper and a pyromaniac streak, often threatening to burn things down when impatient. Eiko joined the company to escape sexual harassment in a conventional office environment. She has a nephew named Yuuki.
Takami Sakuragi (桜木 高見, Sakuragi Takami)
Voiced by: Akiko Yajima (Japanese); Rachael Lillis (English)
A skilled computer hacker, Takami works with Yuka to maintain and upgrade the company's containment software system. She uses inline skates for transportation and is proficient with butterfly knives that have grenades attached, which she sources from Maki's firearms supplier. Shy and possessing an otaku lifestyle, she is attracted to a colleague named Taba but is too timid to confess. Irie's black ops group eventually captures her and forces her to delete all of Kagura's servers.
Yuu Himehagi (姫萩 夕, Himehagi Yū)
Voiced by: Narumi Hidaka (Japanese); Ramona Floyd (English)
Yu serves as Kagura's primary driver, capable of operating any vehicle with a steering wheel. When not driving, she falls into a heavy, immediate sleep. She is a chain smoker who prefers Lucky Strike Ultra Milds and has one older brother and five sisters. Yu is last seen attempting to evade Irie while driving an open jeep.
Yoichi Taba (田波 洋一, Taba Yoichi)
Voiced by: Shinichiro Miki (Japanese); Scott Cargle (English)
Yoichi begins as an unemployed salaryman who joins Kagura Co. by answering a want ad. He proves to be a skilled strategist and proficient with a crossbow and the company's protective seals. He develops a relationship with Ayumi Narusawa, a sniper from the rival Hound organization. Taba declines offers to join Hound and to act as an intermediary for another faction. He is the sole survivor of Kagura Co. ver. 4 alongside Yuka. Three years later, he works as a salaryman for a parts supplier and bears a bullet scar on his left ear.
Kuro-Neko (黒猫)
Voiced by: Katsunosuke Hori
Known as Black Cat (KN), Kuro-Neko is the elusive leader of the were-cats works from the shadows to secure a safe haven for his kind. A "ghost spy" on CIA records since the 1960s, he has ties to defectors Yuri Rastvorov and Viktor Belenko. His complex plans to acquire advanced weaponry cause his own comrades to turn against him, forcing his exile. He later returns with a team of were-cats trained in electronic espionage and intervenes in Yoichi Taba's conflict with the Hound organization.
Maya (まや)
Voiced by: Mayumi Iizuka (Japanese); Megan Hollingshead (English)
A female were-cat who resembles a young schoolgirl, Maya was abandoned as a kitten by Yoichi Taba. After being injured in a conflict, she heeded Kuro-Neko's advice to stand up for herself, triggering her transformation. She becomes one of his operatives and a spy against Kagura Co. ver. 4, though she remains deeply bonded to Taba and befriends the staff. Maya is a skilled infiltrator capable of transferring through phone lines and taking over computer systems. She is fiercely protective of Taba and is last seen within the company's server containment system during its deletion.
Vashuka (ヴァシュカ)
Vashuka serves as Kuro-Neko's primary operative, carrying out missions that range from infiltration to assassination. In human form, she is a tall, athletic woman with long wavy blond hair, typically seen in light-colored suits and dark sunglasses. A vicious and proficient unarmed combatant, she remains calm under pressure. Her name was given to her by Hiroyuki Kagura, who stated it was a popular name for cats in the U.S.S.R.
Socks (ソックス)
Socks is a tall, gentle, blonde were-cat who cares for abandoned kittens at a local shrine and helped raise Maya. After her capture by the Hound organization, she is released with her memories erased and is compelled to assassinate both Maya and Yoichi Taba. She is ultimately defeated by Taki.
Taki (タキ)
A scruffy individual who wears glasses in human form, Taki initially serves as one of Kuro-Neko's operatives. He becomes disillusioned and defects to an opposing faction, but abandons them when they attempt to assassinate Yoichi Taba. Having been one of the abandoned kittens cared for by Socks and Maya, he shares a strong bond with both.
Captain Hirokuni Yajima (矢島 宏國)
Voiced by: Akio Ōtsuka (Japanese); Scottie Ray (English)
Yajima is a grizzled veteran and combat leader with a buzz cut and a lean, muscular build. He is proficient in operating military hardware, from flying helicopters to launching TOW missiles. He resides in the Hound organization's barracks when not on active duty.
Squad Leader Kaoru Yoda (依田 薫)
Voiced by: Toru Okawa (Japanese); David Logan Rankin (English)
Yoda is a large, muscular man with a scraggly mustache who often leads his squad into combat. He frequently clashes with Yuka Kikushima over operational boundaries. Like his colleague Yajima, he resides in the Hound organization's barracks and displays no life outside of it.
Ayumi Narusawa (成沢 あゆみ)
Voiced by: Miki Nagasawa (Japanese); Wendy Walker (OVA 1), Suzy Prue (OVA 2) (English)
Ayumi Narusawa is the sole female operative within the Hound organization. Of medium height with long black hair, she initially struggles with training but gains exceptional sniper proficiency after a relationship with Yoichi Taba. While primarily living at the Hound barracks, she maintains an off-premises apartment. She later provides covert sniper support for Taba during his escape from Irie's black operations squad.
Yuma Kikushima (菊島 雄麻)
Yuma, the elder daughter of Hiroyuki Kagura and Chieko Kikushima, is the clandestine leader of Department 2 and oversees the fate of each iteration of Kagura Company. A tall, thin, dark-haired enthusiast of horror novels, she issues directives to Irie and provides containment software to Yuka. As a former member of Kagura Co. ver. 3, she ordered the deaths of two colleagues to control Luger Ryuu and later destroyed his aircraft. She commands the bombing of an island and frames Kagura Co. ver. 4 for severe crimes. Yuma permits Yuka to join a subsequent company version on the condition she severs all past affiliations.
Shozou Irie, the 3rd (入江 省三)
Voiced by: Koichi Yamadera (Japanese); Alvaro J. Gonzalez (English)
"Irie" is a codename used by the operative who executes Yuma Kagura's commands for Department 2, a role previously held by two others. Initially, he observes the conflicts between Hound, the were-cats, and Kagura Co. from a surveillance vehicle. He later commands Hound operations from a ministry basement control center and contracts Kagura Co. to retrieve a stolen nuclear warhead. Ultimately, he leads a team to eliminate Kagura Co. ver. 4 after they discover the secret were-cat island.
Kotoi (箏井)
A thin, reserved woman with black hair, Kotoi is assigned as Irie's bodyguard against an assassination attempt from within Hound. She successfully protects him, sustaining several broken ribs in the process. From that point, she continues to follow him under orders, though she makes no effort to conceal her personal disdain for him.

== Media ==
=== Manga ===
Written and illustrated by Akihiro Ito, Geobreeders started in Shōnen Gahōsha's seinen manga magazine Young King OURs in 1993. Its latest chapters was published on June 30, 2009, and the series has been on indefinite hiatus since. Shōnen Gahōsha has collected its chapters into individual tankōbon volumes. Sixteen volumes were released from May 24, 1995, to December 10, 2010.

In North America, the manga was licensed by CPM Manga, which only released the first five volumes, from January 2000 to January 2003.

=== Original video animation ===
A three-episode original video animation by Chaos Project, titled in Japan as Geobreeders: File-X – Get Back the Kitty (ジオブリーダーズ File-X ちびねこ奪還, Jioburīdāzu Fairu Ekkus Chibi Neko Dakkan), was released from May 21 to October 21, 1998.

Another OVA, of four episodes, titled Geobreeders 2: Breakthrough (ジオブリーダーズ 2~魍魎遊撃隊 File-XX, Jioburīdāzu 2 ~ Mōryō Yūgekitai Fairu Ekkus Ekkus), was released from July 26, 2000, to March 23, 2001.

In North America, both OVAs were licensed by Central Park Media. The first OVA was released on May 16, 2000, and the second on August 13, 2002.
