= Destro 246 =

Japanese manga series

- Cover of the first tankōbon volume

デストロ246 (Desutoro 246)
- Genre: Action
- Manga
- Written by: Keitaro Takahashi
- Published by: Shogakukan
- Imprint: Sunday GX Comics
- Magazine: Monthly Sunday Gene-X
- Original run: April 19, 2012 – April 19, 2016
- Volumes: 7
- Manga

Destro 016
- Written by: Keitaro Takahashi
- Published by: Shogakukan
- Imprint: Sunday GX Comics
- Magazine: Monthly Sunday Gene-X
- Original run: April 19, 2021 – present
- Volumes: 7
- icon

Destro 246 (Japanese: デストロ246, Hepburn: Desutoro 246) is a Japanese manga series written and illustrated by Keitaro Takahashi. It was serialized in Shogakukan's seinen manga magazine Monthly Sunday Gene-X from April 2012 to April 2016, with its chapters collected in seven tankōbon volumes. A prequel, titled Destro 016, started in the same magazine in April 2021.

== Publication ==
Written and illustrated by Keitaro Takahashi, Destro 246 was serialized in Shogakukan's seinen manga magazine Monthly Sunday Gene-X from April 19, 2012, to April 19, 2016. Shogakukan collected its chapters in seven tankōbon volumes, released from October 19, 2012, to June 17, 2016.

A spin-off novel written by Kosuke Fujiwara, titled Destro 246 Hammer Rage (デストロ246 ハンマーレイジ, Desutoro 246 Hanmā Reiji), was published on February 19, 2019 (with a preview chapter published in Monthly Sunday Gene-X on January 19 of the same year).

A prequel manga, titled Destro 016 (デストロ016, Desutoro 016), started in Monthly Sunday Gene-X on April 19, 2021. (Note: Anime News Network incorrectly stated that it began on May 19, 2021.) Shogakukan released the first tankōbon volume on November 19, 2021. As of May 19, 2026, seven volumes have been released.

=== Volumes ===
==== Destro 246 ====
No.	Release date	ISBN
1	October 19, 2012	978-4-09-157325-4
2	May 17, 2013	978-4-09-157348-3
3	December 19, 2013	978-4-09-157365-0
4	July 18, 2014	978-4-09-157383-4
5	February 19, 2015	978-4-09-157408-4
6	October 19, 2015	978-4-09-157428-2
7	June 17, 2016	978-4-09-157449-7

==== Destro 016 ====
No.	Release date	ISBN
1	November 19, 2021	978-4-09-157663-7
2	July 19, 2022	978-4-09-157682-8
3	May 19, 2023	978-4-09-157753-5
4	January 18, 2024	978-4-09-157791-7
5	September 19, 2024	978-4-09-157839-6
6	June 19, 2025	978-4-09-157885-3
7	May 19, 2026	978-4-09-158218-8

== Reception ==
The seven volumes of Destro 246 debuted on Oricon's weekly chart of best-selling manga. (Note: Ranking of each volume: Volume 1: 25th; Volume 2: 12th; Volume 3: 20th; Volume 4: 16th; Volume 5: 10th; Volume 6: 7th; Volume 7: 22nd)
