= Jormungand (manga) =

Japanese manga series and its franchise

- Cover of the first tankōbon volume, featuring Koko Hekmatyar (left) and Jonathan "Jonah" Mar (right)

ヨルムンガンド (Yorumungando)
- Genre: Action, thriller
- Manga
- Written by: Keitaro Takahashi
- Published by: Shogakukan
- English publisher: Viz Media
- Magazine: Monthly Sunday Gene-X
- Original run: April 19, 2006 – January 19, 2012
- Volumes: 11
- Anime television series
- Directed by: Keitaro Motonaga
- Produced by: Gaku Iwasa
- Written by: Yōsuke Kuroda
- Music by: Taku Iwasaki
- Studio: White Fox
- Licensed by: Crunchyroll
- Original network: Tokyo MX, TV Kanagawa, TV Aichi, KBS, BS11, Sun TV, AT-X
- English network: US: Funimation Channel
- Original run: April 10, 2012 – June 26, 2012
- Episodes: 12
- Anime television series

Jormungand: Perfect Order
- Directed by: Keitaro Motonaga
- Produced by: Gaku Iwasa
- Written by: Yōsuke Kuroda
- Music by: Taku Iwasaki
- Studio: White Fox
- Licensed by: Crunchyroll
- Original network: Tokyo MX, TV Kanagawa, TV Aichi, KBS, BS11, Sun TV, AT-X
- English network: US: Funimation Channel
- Original run: October 10, 2012 – December 26, 2012
- Episodes: 12
- icon

Jormungand (Japanese: ヨルムンガンド, Hepburn: Yorumungando) (Note: The title is a reference to the sea serpent Jörmungandr from Norse mythology.) is a Japanese manga series written and illustrated by Keitaro Takahashi. It was serialized in Shogakukan's seinen manga magazine Monthly Sunday Gene-X from April 2006 to January 2012, with its chapters collected in eleven tankōbon volumes.

An anime television series produced by White Fox was broadcast between April and June 2012. A second season titled Jormungand: Perfect Order aired from October to December 2012.

The manga was licensed for English language release in North America by Viz Media. Both seasons have been licensed by Funimation in North America and Manga Entertainment in the United Kingdom.

== Plot ==
The series follows Koko Hekmatyar, a young arms dealer who sells weapons under HCLI, an international shipping corporation and illegal smuggling operation. As one of the company's unofficial weapon dealers, she sells weapons in a variety of countries while avoiding both local and international authorities. Traveling with her is a team of bodyguards, mostly composed of former soldiers. The newest addition to her crew is Jonah, an inexpressive and deadly child soldier who hates arms dealers.

== Media ==
=== Manga ===
Written and illustrated by Keitaro Takahashi, Jormungand was serialized in Shogakukan's seinen manga magazine Monthly Sunday Gene-X from April 19, 2006, (Note: It started in the May 2006 issue of the magazine (cover date), released on April 19 of the same year.) to January 19, 2012. Shogakukan compiled its chapters in eleven tankōbon volumes, released from November 17, 2006, to April 19, 2012.

In North America, Viz Media announced the English language release of the manga in February 2009. The eleven volumes were released from November 10, 2009, to May 14, 2013.

==== Volumes ====
| No. | Original release date | Original ISBN | English release date | English ISBN |
|---|---|---|---|---|
| 1 | November 17, 2006 | 978-4-09-157069-7 | November 10, 2009 | 978-1-4215-3215-8 |
| 2 | April 19, 2007 | 978-4-09-157089-5 | February 9, 2010 | 978-1-4215-3216-5 |
| 3 | October 19, 2007 | 978-4-09-157109-0 | May 11, 2010 | 978-1-4215-3217-2 |
| 4 | April 18, 2008 | 978-4-09-157128-1 | August 10, 2010 | 978-1-4215-3218-9 |
| 5 | October 30, 2008; October 17, 2008 (LE) | 978-4-09-157150-2; 978-4-09-159063-3 (LE) | November 9, 2010 | 978-1-4215-3226-4 |
| 6 | April 17, 2009 | 978-4-09-157174-8 | February 8, 2011 | 978-1-4215-3506-7 |
| 7 | October 19, 2009 | 978-4-09-157190-8 | May 17, 2011 | 978-1-4215-3686-6 |
| 8 | May 19, 2010 | 978-4-09-157215-8 | January 17, 2012 | 978-1-4215-4087-0 |
| 9 | February 28, 2011; February 16, 2011 (LE) | 978-4-09-157258-5; 978-4-09-941705-5 (LE) | June 19, 2012 | 978-1-4215-4189-1 |
| 10 | December 19, 2011 | 978-4-09-157297-4 | January 15, 2013 | 978-1-4215-4927-9 |
| 11 | April 19, 2012 | 978-4-09-157305-6 | May 14, 2013 | 978-1-4215-5232-3 |

=== Anime ===
An anime television series by White Fox and produced by Geneon was announced on the 10th volume of the manga. The anime began airing on April 10, 2012, on Tokyo MX, Television Kanagawa, TV Aichi, and KBS, also on later dates on Sun TV, BS11, and AT-X. The show was streamed on Showtime, NicoNico, Bandai Channel and GyaO. A second season of the series, Jormungand: Perfect Order, which began broadcasting on Japanese TV on October 9, 2012. The two seasons aired on Japanese TV at 12:30 AM.

The first release of Jormungand on DVD and Blu-ray was on June 27, 2012, with the first two episodes, "Gun Metal, Calico Road" and "Pulsar" included. Subsequent releases followed with two episodes each on both Blu-rays and DVDs on July 25, August 29 and September 26, 2012. The Perfect Order DVD/Blu-rays was first released in Japan on December 21, 2012. The DVD and Blu-ray version of the first two seasons of the series was released on February 18, 2014.

Showgate handles licensing aspect of Jormungand outside Japan. A sneak preview of the anime was held on March 31 to April 1, 2012, at the Anime Contents Expo at the Makuhari Messe in Chiba.

==== Music ====
The Jormungand Original Soundtrack was released on June 27, 2012, following the conclusion of the first season. It was composed by Taku Iwasaki and released by the record label Geneon Universal Entertainment.

For the first season, both the opening and ending themes were produced by I've Sound. The opening song is "Borderland" by Mami Kawada, and the ending theme is "Ambivalentidea" by Nagi Yanagi. "Borderland" was released as a single on May 30, 2012, while "Ambivalentidea" was released as a single on June 6, 2012. Both songs were released as singles by Geneon Universal Entertainment.

For the second season, the opening is "Under / Shaft" by Maon Kurosaki, while the ending is "Laterality" (ラテラリティ) by Nagi Yanagi.

Additionally, the song "Time To Attack" by American rapper/hip-hop artist SANTA is featured in episodes throughout both seasons of the show, as well as during the next-episode previews at the end of each episode.

=== Drama CD ===
A 6-part Drama CD had been released prior to the anime, based on the Orchestra story arc. Of all the voice actors involved in the CD, only Unsho Ishizuka reprised his role as Lehm while the voice actors for everyone else involved in the drama were replaced.

=== Radio show ===
A radio show hosted by voice actors Shizuka Itō and Mutsumi Tamura was broadcast in 2012 to promote the series.

== Reception ==
=== Manga ===
Scott Green of Ain't It Cool News described the series as enjoyable but underachieving. Matthew Warner considered the fourth volume's focus on the weapons trade a pleasant change of pace, but was disappointed by the absence of the violence and dark, twisted plot points found in earlier volumes. Erica Friedman, organizer of Yuricon, noted the yuri potential of Valmet but described the manga as just a dumb manga that she really liked. Karen Maeda enjoyed the action in the sixth volume, found the panels easy to follow, and hoped that Jormungand would be adapted into an anime.

Carlo Santos of Anime News Network identified challenging ideas about war, peace, and world affairs, combined with military action.

In Japan, the ninth volume sold 41,712 copies in one week for a total of 42,337, ranking 27th out of 30. The eleventh volume ranked 10th with 70,593 copies sold. It later ranked 20th out of 30, selling 34,697 copies weekly for a total of 105,290.

=== Anime ===
In The Anime Encyclopedia, Jonathan Clements and Helen McCarthy praised the anime adaptation for its intense action sequences, tightly constructed plotting, and character development. They commended the detailed depiction of military equipment, the subdued color palette, and Taku Iwasaki's musical score, though they criticized some character drawings and simplistic facial expressions. They compared the series to Gunsmith Cats, which they considered more polished, and described Jormungand as dangerously seductive in its embrace of action as its own justification.

Discussing the second season, Jormungand: Perfect Order, Clements and McCarthy found its action less effective and its animation more reliant on shortcuts and rapid editing. Nevertheless, they praised its more complex storyline and the further development of Koko's character, particularly the exploration of her moral contradictions. They observed that although the second season gave greater attention to ethical questions, the series ultimately continued to prioritize the entertainment value of violence.
