= Tsuri Chichi Nagisa =

Japanese manga series

- Cover of the first tankōbon volume

釣りチチ・渚
- Genre: Comedy
- Manga
- Written by: Masaki Sato
- Published by: Shogakukan
- Imprint: Sunday GX Comics
- Magazine: Monthly Sunday Gene-X
- Original run: March 19, 2009 – February 19, 2012
- Volumes: 5

Tsuri Chichi Nagisa (釣りチチ・渚) is a Japanese manga series written and illustrated by Masaki Sato. It was serialized in Shogakukan's seinen manga magazine Monthly Sunday Gene-X from March 2009 to February 2012, with its chapters collected in five tankōbon volumes.

== Publication ==
Written and illustrated by Masaki Sato, Tsuri Chichi Nagisa was serialized in Shogakukan's seinen manga magazine Monthly Sunday Gene-X from March 19, 2009, to February 19, 2012. Shogakukan collected its chapters in five tankōbon volumes, released from November 19, 2009, to April 19, 2012.

=== Volumes ===
No.	Japanese release date	Japanese ISBN
1	November 19, 2009	978-4-09-157195-3
2	July 17, 2010	978-4-09-157220-2
3	April 19, 2011	978-4-09-157265-3
4	November 18, 2011	978-4-09-157299-8
5	April 19, 2012	978-4-09-157303-2
