= Zombie Hunter =

Novel by Kazumasa Hirai

- Cover of volume 3

死霊狩り (Shirei Kari)
- Genre: Action, horror, science fiction
- Novel series
- Written by: Kazumasa Hirai
- Published by: Hayakawa Publishing and Kadokawa Shoten
- Original run: 1972 – 1978
- Volumes: 3
- Manga
- Written by: Kazumasa Hirai
- Illustrated by: Yang Kyung-il
- Published by: Enterbrain
- Magazine: Comic Beam
- Original run: July 1998 – unknown
- Volumes: 4

Zombie Hunter (Japanese: 死霊狩り, Hepburn: Shirei Kari) is a dark and violent novel series published in the 1970s by Japanese writer, Kazumasa Hirai. It is about an ex-race car driver who hunts down and kills zombies.

== Plot ==
The main character, Toshio Tamura, was once a grand prix champion who finds himself to be one of many people on a jungle island where he goes through a series of survival tests. He discovers that the purpose of the cruel and deadly games was to find people worthy enough to hunt down alien parasites that hid inside corpses, turning said corpses into zombies. Toshio initially rejects the offer to become a zombie hunter since he sees his would-be boss as a dangerous and sick man, but soon finds himself forced into the role when his loved ones are endangered.

== Manga adaptation ==
It was adapted into a manga starting from June 1998, illustrated by Korean comic book artist, Yang Kyung-il. The manga series has not proceeded after the publishing of volume 4, with rumors of conflict between Yang and Hirai.
