= My Girlfriend Is 8 Meters Tall =

Japanese manga series

- First tankōbon volume cover

ちえりの恋は8メートル (Chieri no Koi wa 8 Mētoru)
- Genre: Romantic comedy
- Manga
- Written by: Wataru Mitogawa
- Published by: Shueisha
- English publisher: NA: Seven Seas Entertainment
- Imprint: Jump Comics+
- Magazine: Shōnen Jump+
- Original run: October 2, 2022 – January 26, 2025
- Volumes: 6

My Girlfriend Is 8 Meters Tall (ちえりの恋は8メートル, Chieri no Koi wa 8 Mētoru) is a Japanese manga series written and illustrated by Wataru Mitogawa. It was serialized on Shueisha's Shōnen Jump+ manga service from October 2022 to January 2025.

== Plot ==
The story follows Kotaki Yumeji, a student who reunites with his childhood friend Omine Chieri after she enrolls in his high school. Omine, despite being of a normal size in her youth, grew to a height of 8 meters in her adolescence. The series follows Kotaki being assigned as Omine's "helper" to navigate high school life with her unusual height; as the series progresses the two characters develop a mutual romantic interest.

== Publication ==
Written and illustrated by Wataru Mitogawa, My Girlfriend Is 8 Meters Tall was serialized on Shueisha's Shōnen Jump+ manga service from October 2, 2022, to January 26, 2025. The series' chapters were collected in six tankōbon volumes from February 3, 2023, to March 4, 2025.

On February 5, 2025, Seven Seas Entertainment announced that they had licensed the series for English publication beginning in August 2025.

No.	Original release date	Original ISBN	North American release date	North American ISBN
1	February 3, 2023	978-4-08-883480-1	August 26, 2025	979-8-89373-688-5
2	July 4, 2023	978-4-08-883651-5	December 16, 2025	979-8-89373-689-2
3	December 4, 2023	978-4-08-883815-1	April 28, 2026	979-8-89373-690-8
4	May 2, 2024	978-4-08-884101-4	August 11, 2026	979-8-89561-382-5
5	October 4, 2024	978-4-08-884228-8	December 8, 2026	979-8-89561-383-2
6	March 4, 2025	978-4-08-884379-7	—	—

== Reception ==
The series was nominated for the ninth Next Manga Awards in the web category.

== See also ==
- Gunbured × Sisters, another manga series by the same author
