= Blade of Heaven =

South Korean manhwa series

- Cover of the Tokyopop edition of Blade of Heaven vol. 1 (2005), art by Kyung-il Yang

소마신화전기 Soma sinhwajeongi
- Genre: Action-adventure, Fantasy, Drama, Sword and sorcery
- Author: Yong-su Hwang
- Illustrator: Kyung-il Yang
- Publisher: (South Korea) Daiwon C.I.
- English publisher: (Australia) (New Zealand) Madman Entertainment (United States) Tokyopop
- Original run: 2005 – Present
- Volumes: 10

Blade of Heaven is a manhwa fantasy-adventure series written by Yong-su Hwang and illustrated by Kyung-il Yang, published by Daiwon C.I. The North American version of the manhwa is published by Tokyopop and distributed in Australia and New Zealand by Madman Entertainment. Currently only volumes 1-10 are published through Tokyopop.

== Plot ==
Blade of Heaven begins with a young boy by the name of Soma who had been accused by the King of the Heaven for supposedly stealing his sword. Heavenly beings along with Demons have been fighting for many generations for ultimate supremacy. Before all of this began however, there was a certain period of time commonly referred to as the "Great Battle of Heaven" before human beings supposedly had existed. This was a battle between the demon realm and the heavenly warriors to see who would be fighting to rule the land. Within this ancient battle, there were three legendary swords that anyone would have sacrificed their own life to attain; One of which being the Sword of Kwangma. This vicious sword had been known to have left many levels of blood in its ruthless wake, and particularly chose those of high status as its master. The second sword is the Sword of the Guardian Spirits, in which can contain the four elements of the world within itself. The Guardian Spirit sword can use these elements to its bidding within any moments of need. The last of the three swords, which was known as the Blade of Heaven was clearly the greatest of the three. When at one time in which the demons had the upper hand, the wielder of this sword suddenly had appeared and destroyed all of them without getting hurt. The previous renowned wielder of this sword became referred to as King Pachun (who unknown to Soma is his father). The princess of heaven, and the General Winter join him on an adventure to retrieve this Blade of Heaven. Although it is revealed that Soma is the one who stole the sword, the blade later chose him as its new owner. The ending of the 10th volume says and the world will never know.

== Characters ==
- Soma
- Princess Aroomee of Heaven
- General Winter
- Fat Ninja
- Makumrang
- Googoo
- Kay
- Chuldo
- Dong Dong
- Ryuha
- Barurugo
- Yin
- Yang
- Wulyohon
- Machun
- Machunroo
- Shimme
- Wild Beast Clan
- Tan
- General Autumn
- General Spring
- General Summer
- Granny
- King of Heaven
- King Pachun
- Darkling
- Echo
- Pirooto
- Demon Lord Fan
- Queen Meeroo of Heaven
- Chaeha
- Grandpa

== Legacy ==
Game based on the work called Myth of Soma was made which was serviced by Game Network.

The manhwa is going to be re-serialized on KakaoPage as a webtoon.
