= Wilderness (manga) =

Japanese manga series

- First tankōbon volume cover

ワイルダネス (Wairudanesu)
- Genre: Action
- Manga
- Written by: Akihiro Ito
- Published by: Shogakukan
- Imprint: Sunday GX Comics
- Magazine: Monthly Sunday Gene-X
- Original run: August 19, 2000 – July 18, 2025
- Volumes: 9
- icon

Wilderness (Japanese: ワイルダネス, Hepburn: Wairudanesu) is a Japanese manga series written and illustrated by Akihiro Ito. It started in Shogakukan's seinen manga magazine Monthly Sunday Gene-X in August 2000; it went on hiatus in June 2009, resuming after a nearly 12-year hiatus in May 2021, and finished in August 2025. Its chapters were collected in nine tankōbon volumes.

== Publication ==
Written and illustrated by Akihiro Ito, Wilderness started in Shogakukan's seinen manga magazine Monthly Sunday Gene-X on August 19, 2000. (Note: It began in the second issue of the magazine (cover date September 2000), released on August 19, 2000.) Following the 68th chapter, published on June 19, 2009, Ito put the manga on hiatus due to a sickness that rendered him unable to use his dominant right hand for drawing. After a nearly 12-year hiatus, the manga resumed in the magazine on May 19, 2021. The series finished on July 18, 2025. Shogakukan collected its chapters in nine tankōbon volumes, released from September 19, 2001, to October 17, 2025.

=== Volumes ===
No.	Japanese release date	Japanese ISBN
1	September 19, 2001	978-4-09-157071-0
2	December 12, 2002	978-4-09-157072-7
3	April 19, 2004	978-4-09-157073-4
4	July 19, 2005	978-4-09-157074-1
5	November 17, 2006	978-4-09-157070-3
6	December 19, 2007	978-4-09-157116-8
7	May 19, 2009	978-4-09-157175-5
8	December 19, 2022	978-4-09-157716-0
9	October 17, 2025	978-4-09-157897-6
