= Assassin's Creed: Blade of Shao Jun =

Japanese manga series

- First volume cover

アサシン クリード チャイナ (Asashin Kurīdo Chaina)
- Genre: Adventure
- Manga
- Written by: Minoji Kurata
- Published by: Shogakukan
- English publisher: NA: Viz Media
- Magazine: Monthly Sunday Gene-X
- Original run: October 19, 2019 – June 17, 2021
- Volumes: 4
- icon

Assassin's Creed: Blade of Shao Jun, known in Japan as Assassin's Creed: China (Japanese: アサシン クリード チャイナ, Hepburn: Asashin Kurīdo Chaina), is a Japanese manga series written and illustrated by Minoji Kurata. The story follows Shao Jun, the protagonist of Ubisoft's 2015 video game Assassin's Creed Chronicles: China, and her modern-day descendant Lisa Huang (known as Kō Risa in the Japanese version). It was serialized in Shogakukan's seinen manga magazine Monthly Sunday Gene-X from October 2019 to June 2021, with its chapters collected in four tankōbon volumes.

== Plot ==
The series alternates between the perspectives of Shao Jun and her modern-day descendant Lisa Huang, who relives her genetic memories using an Animus device.

=== Shao Jun ===
In 1526, Shao Jun returns to China after her journey to Europe, where she met the Italian Assassins' renowned Mentor Ezio Auditore da Firenze and was given a Precursor box to guide her on her quest. Shao Jun's mission is to eliminate the Eight Tigers, a group of Templar eunuchs who influenced the Jiajing Emperor into launching a purge of the Chinese Brotherhood. Shao Jun easily assassinates her first target, Gao Feng, in the Maijishan Grottoes, though she loses the Precursor box in the process. After rescuing her old teacher Hong Liwei, who was imprisoned by the Templars, Shao Jun escapes and regroups with her Mentor, Wang Yangming. Yangming reveals that he also killed a Tiger, Ma Yongcheng, leaving only four targets to eliminate: Gu Dayong, Wei Bin, Qiu Ju, and the Tigers' leader, Zhang Yong.

Later, Yangming is informed by a contact that Gu Dayong, who controls the slave trade in Macau, has the Precursor box. Shao Jun infiltrates the city and rescues a young boy named Xiao Hu, who reveals that his father is also an Assassin. Unable to save Xiao Hu's father, Shao Jun exacts revenge on Dayong, but learns that the Precuror box is no longer in Macau. In retaliation for Dayong's murder, Qiu Ju orders the guards to burn Macau's port, to show the Assassins the consequences of their actions. Shao Jun manages to save several civilians and escape, but the incident leaves her traumatized.

By 1529, Shao Jun is still struggling with her trauma and is uncertain if she is fighting the Templars simply out of revenge or to protect the people's freedom. Regardless, when Yangming arrives with news that Wei Bin is in Nan'an, Shao Jun decides to accompany her Mentor to the city. In the process, she is reunited with Xiao Hu, who survived the Macau fires and reveals that the people of the city consider her a hero. After Xiao Hu explains that the Templars are solely responsible for the atrocities they commit and that Shao Jun should not blame herself for other people's actions, the Assassin regains her resolve. She infiltrates Wei Bin's stronghold and kills him, only to learn that the other Tigers have lured Yangming into a trap. Arriving too late to save her Mentor, Shao Jun meets a Buddhist monk, who helps her organize Yangming's funeral and teaches her about the Precursors and the special abilities she inherited from them.

In 1530, Shao Jun infiltrates the Forbidden City to rescue her childhood friend, Empress Zhang Qijie. However, while meeting with Qijie, Shao Jun is confronted by Qiu Ju, who claims that the Empress has betrayed and lured her into a trap. Knowing her friend was forced to help the Templars, Shao Jun forgives her and fights Qiu Ju, who is killed by falling debris after the chamber they are in catches fire. Shao Jun and Qijie escape to safety and reconcile after the Assassin admits that she misjudged her friend, thinking Qijie needed her protection when she was more than capable of looking after herself.

By 1532, Shao Jun has begun training Xiao Hu as her Assassin apprentice. After learning that Zhang Yong is planning to let the Mongols led by Altan Khan invade China so he can maintain his grip on power, the two Assassins travel to the Great Wall to prevent the invasion. Shao Jun confronts Zhang Yong, who boasts that the Precursor box has been shipped out of China and that his death will not stop the Templars' plans. Shao Jun acknowledges that the Assassin-Templar war will continue for centuries to come, but declares that her conflict with Zhang Yong is over, and kills the Tiger leader.

Years later, an older Shao Jun and an adult Xiao Hu meet atop the Great Wall. Having completed his training, Xiao Hu retakes his birth name of Kotetsu and informs Shao Jun that he will be returning to his homeland of Japan to fight the Templars' growing influence and establish a new Assassin Brotherhood. Shao Jun wishes her apprentice good luck in his mission, and the two hug each other and recite the tenets of the Assassins' Creed before parting ways.

=== Lisa Huang ===
In 2019, Lisa begins attending therapy at Abstergo Industries' clinic in Yokohama, under the supervision of Dr. Kaori Kagami. As Lisa has a history of violent impulses, having been expelled from several schools after getting into fights with her teachers and classmates, she hopes that the therapy will help her learn to suppress her aggressive side. As part of her treatment, Lisa is placed in an Animus, where she relives Shao Jun's memories.

After experiencing the 1526 Macau fires, Lisa is affected by Shao Jun's trauma, but Dr. Kagami assures her that, through her therapy, she can learn how to avoid succumbing to the same path of violence as her ancestor. After Lisa leaves the clinic for the day, Kagami calls her superior, Ellen Kaye, to report on the progress of her search for Shao Jun's "treasure". Meanwhile, Lisa begins to experience the "Bleeding Effect", seeing hallucinations of Shao Jun's memories outside the Animus. She and her cousin Mari are later approached by the Assassin Kiyoshi Takakura, who has been spying on Lisa's sessions with Kagami and invites the girls to have a talk. Kiyoshi explains the history of the Assassins and Templars and warns Lisa that Kagami does not truly wish to help her. However, Lisa refuses to believe him and returns to the Abstergo clinic to continue her therapy.

As Lisa's condition worsens, she again meets with Mari, who informs her of what she learned from Kiyoshi after Lisa's departure. She reveals that Abstergo is a front for the modern-day Templar Order, and that Dr. Kagami is a Templar who used to work at a facility in Madrid, until a riot broke out. Although Mari warns her that Kagami is likely using her for her own ends, Lisa is determined to learn the truth for herself and returns to the clinic.

After reliving Shao Jun and Zhang Qijie's reconciliation, Lisa notices the similarities between their relationship and her own friendship with Mari. However, she then begins to suffer from the Bleeding Effect and asks to end her therapy for the day. When Dr. Kagami refuses, Lisa reveals that she knows the Templar is using her and does not care about her well-being. In response, Kagami pulls out a gun and forces Lisa back into the Animus against her will.

After experiencing Shao Jun's confrontation with Zhang Yong, Dr. Kagami laments her failure to discover the whereabouts of the Precursor box before being confronted by Lisa. Using her skills gained through the Bleeding Effect, Lisa disarms Kagami and admits that the doctor helped her after all, as her experiences with Shao Jun's memories taught her that she doesn't need to change who she is. At that moment, Mari and Kiyoshi arrive, having stormed the Abstergo clinic to rescue Lisa. After destroying Kagami's Animus and sparing the doctor's life, the trio leave the clinic and are greeted by Kiyoshi's Mentor, Saeko Mochizuki. Saeko praises Lisa for everything she has accomplished and invites both her and Mari to join the Assassins. After they accept, Saeko tasks them to find Shao Jun's Precursor box. (Note: Given that the Precursor box was destroyed during the events of the 2017–2018 comic Assassin's Creed: Uprising, which takes place before Blade of Shao Jun, this mission is seemingly non-sensical and indicates a possible continuity error or retcon.)

== Publication ==
Assassin's Creed: Blade of Shao Jun, written and illustrated by Minoji Kurata, was serialized in Shogakukan's seinen manga magazine Monthly Sunday Gene-X from October 19, 2019, to June 17, 2021. Shogakukan has collected its chapters into four individual tankōbon volumes, released from February 19, 2020, to August 19, 2021.

In North America, Viz Media announced an English version of the series in September 2020. It was released from February 16, 2021, to June 21, 2022.

=== Volumes ===
| No. | Original release date | Original ISBN | English release date | English ISBN |
|---|---|---|---|---|
| 1 | February 19, 2020 | 978-4-09-157589-0 | February 16, 2021 | 978-1-9747-2123-8 |
1. "Homecoming" (帰還, Kikan); 2. "The Assassin Brotherhood and The Templar Order" (アサシン教団とテンプル騎士団, Asashin Kyō-dan to Tenpuru Kishi-dan); 3. "Port" (港, Minato); 4. "The Slave Trader" (奴隷商人, Dorei Shōnin)
| 2 | July 17, 2020 | 978-4-09-157590-6 | August 17, 2021 | 978-1-9747-2124-5 |
5. "Consequences" (結果, Kekka); 6. "The Bleeding Effect" (流入現象, Ryūnyū Genshō); 7. "Shao Jun and Qixie" (少芸 と 七姐(シャオ・ユン ナージエ), Shao Yun to Najie); 8. "Reunion" (再会, Saikai)
| 3 | February 19, 2021 | 978-4-09-157626-2 | January 18, 2022 | 978-1-9747-2651-6 |
9. "Trap" (罠, Wana); 10. "Funeral Pyre" (弔いの炎, Tomurai no Honō); 11. "Eagle Vision" (鷹の目, Taka no Me); 12. "Warning" (忠告, Chūkoku); 13. "The Court" (後宮, Kōkyū)
| 4 | August 19, 2021 | 978-4-09-157641-5 | June 21, 2022 | 978-1-9747-3222-7 |
14. "Dear Friend" (親友, Shin'yū); 15. "To Each Her Own Arena" (それぞれの戦場, Sorezore no senjō); 16. "The Great Wall" (長城, Chōjō); 17. "Culmination" (決着, Ketchaku); 18. "Creed" (信条, Shinjō)
