= Binbō Shimai Monogatari =

Japanese manga series and its anime adaptation

- First tankōbon volume cover

貧乏姉妹物語
- Genre: Comedy; Drama; Slice of life
- Manga
- Written by: Izumi Kazuto
- Published by: Shogakukan
- Magazine: Monthly Sunday Gene-X
- Original run: April 19, 2004 – October 19, 2006
- Volumes: 4
- Anime television series
- Directed by: Yukio Kaizawa
- Produced by: Kenji Ōta; Yōsuke Asama; Masanori Gotō; Hiroshi Satō
- Written by: Tsuru Izumi
- Music by: Akiko Kosaka
- Studio: Toei Animation
- Original network: TV Asahi
- Original run: June 30, 2006 – September 15, 2006
- Episodes: 10
- icon

Binbō Shimai Monogatari (貧乏姉妹物語; lit. Poor Sisters Story), also known as Flat Broke Sisters, is a Japanese manga series written and illustrated by Izumi Kazuto. It was serialized in Shogakukan's seinen manga magazine Monthly Sunday Gene-X from April 2004 to October 2006, with its chapters collected in four tankōbon volumes. A ten-episode anime television series adaptation by Toei Animation was broadcast from June to September 2006.

== Plot ==
Binbō Shimai Monogatari's plot revolves around two sisters, a junior high school student named Kyō and an elementary school student Asu, who live alone. Their mother died the same year she gave birth to Asu and a few years later, their father, faced with a large gambling debt, ran away, abandoning them. They work together to live their lives and go to school in spite of the difficulties they face, receiving help from the people around them from time to time.

== Characters ==
Kyō Yamada (山田 きょう, Yamada Kyō)
Voiced by: Maaya Sakamoto
Kyō is a 15 year-old junior high school student. She delivers newspapers to make money for their small family unit and has also taken up a job as a tutor. She is afraid of lightning, but does not let that stop her from taking good care of her younger sister. Kyō promised her deceased mother that she would take good care of Asu and is doing everything in her power to live up to that promise. Her name is a homonym, as kyō can be written 今日^{?} which means "today".
Asu Yamada (山田 あす, Yamada Asu)
Voiced by: Tomoko Kaneda
Asu is a 9 year-old elementary school student. She does the shopping for the family and also takes care of the cooking and cleaning. Asu is extremely fond of her big sister and tries to do everything she can to make life easier for her, since she is, as yet, too young to work and earn money herself. Asu is quite skilled; she has been chosen as her class representative and is frequently consulted by her classmates when they have trouble with their homework. She claims to be tone-deaf, but manages to sing after their neighbour, Masao, tutors. Curiously, she has a single memory of her mother, who died when Asu was still a baby; she remembers her mother, while she was still carrying Asu in her womb, asking Asu to take care of Kyō. Asu's name is also a homonym, written 明日^{?} it means "tomorrow".
Genzō Hayashi (林 源三, Hayashi Genzō)
Voiced by: Mugihito
Genzō, the owner of the apartment building where the sisters live, is an older man who rarely smiles and appears gruff and forbidding. He is, however, very much concerned with the sisters' welfare and was the only one willing to take them in when their father abandoned them. In his own way, he tries to look out for the Yamada sisters. They apparently remind him of his wife, Eriko, and daughter, Mami, who were killed in an accident. For all that he cares about the sisters (whom he treats like granddaughters), he still collects the full rent every month.
Echigoya Sisters (越後屋姉妹, Echigoya Shimai)

Kinko Echigoya (越後屋 金子, Echigoya Kinko), Voiced by: Naomi Shindō
Ginko Echigoya (越後屋 銀子, Echigoya Ginko), Voiced by: Etsuko Kozakura

Kinko and Ginko are another pair of sisters in the story. Kinko (golden child) is the elder, Ginko (silver child) the younger. Ginko attends the same elementary school as Asu and is also her class representative, but is considerably less popular, since her personality is more domineering than Asu's. Kinko is a member of her school's student council and Ginko expects that she will have to live up to her older sister's example. These sisters are both blond-haired and belong to an extremely rich family, with all the advantages thereof. However, their relationship is much rockier than that enjoyed by Kyō and Asu, since they do not always understand each other as well as they should. Ginko initially feels that she is a constant disappointment to her older sister and that Kinko must dislike her; Kinko in turn thinks that Ginko hates her. Eventually a troubled Ginko manages to understand her sister a little better and patch their relationship somewhat thanks to advice from Asu and her covert observations of the Yamada sisters' homelife - through a telescope. At one time, the sisters kept a pet alligator named John in their garden, who had been visited with the indignity of a bow ribbon. Kinko has an obsession with acquiring bargains from shops and has charged Ginko with acquiring them after her school goes out. Since they are rich, Ginko is as baffled by this obsession as are the Yamada sisters.
Ranko Saegusa (三枝 蘭子, Saegusa Ranko)
Voiced by: Akiko Hiramatsu
The sisters' downstairs neighbour is a woman who constantly wears sunglasses and is apparently abysmally bad at housekeeping. It is unclear what kind of work she does, but she is apparently well-off, as could be seen when Kyō found a wallet Ranko had dropped. Asu is the only one to have seen Ranko without her sunglasses, which makes her seem somewhat suspicious. Asu claims the 'neighbour onee-san' looks like a nice person without them. When she learns of the sisters' situation, she warms up to them, even lending Kyō one of her suits and fixing her makeup when the elder sister wants to look a bit more mature for Asu's school's open house.
Masao Ichinokura (一ノ倉 正男, Ichinokura Masao)
Voiced by: Daisuke Kishio
Masao is another of the Yamada sisters' neighbours at the apartment building. He is an aspiring singer who has to live off part-time jobs and is struggling to make his breakthrough. Masao already has a loyal following of fans, which supplies him with food. An encounter with Asu and her subsequent request for singing lessons so that she can pass a test at school, motivates him not to give up his dreams of becoming a singer.

== Media ==
=== Manga ===
Binbō Shimai Monogatari, written and illustrated by Izumi Kazuto, was serialized in Shogakukan's seinen manga magazine Monthly Sunday Gene-X from April 19, 2004, to October 19, 2006. (Note: It was serialized from the May 2004 to the November 2006 issues of the magazine (cover dates), released on April 19, 2004, and October 19, 2006, respectively.) Shogakukan collected its chapters in four tankōbon volumes, released from August 12, 2005, to December 19, 2006.

==== Volumes ====
No.	Japanese release date	Japanese ISBN
1	August 12, 2005	4-09-157341-X
01. "Our lovely home" (麗しの我が家, "Uruwashi no Wagaya"); 02. "The only tow people in the world" (世界にたった2人だけ, "Sekai ni Tatta Futari dake"); 03. "My big sister, the worry wart" (お姉さんは心配性, "Onē-san wa Shinpaishō"); 04. "Secret place" (とっておきの場所, "Totteoki no Basho"); 05. "A once-a-month pleasure" (月に一度のお楽しみ, "Tsuki ni Ichido no Otanoshimi"); 06. "Good little sister" (良い妹, "Ii Imōto"); 07. "Summer winds" (夏風, "Natsukaze"); 08. "Cool breeze" (涼風, "Suzukaze"); 09. "Fireworks for two" (ふたりの花火, "Futari no Hanabi"); 10. "Secret" (ひみつ, "Himitsu"); 11. "Genzo Hayashi, 78 years old" (林源三78歳, "Hayashi Genzo 78 Sai"); 12. "Just as you are" (そのままで, "Sonomama de"); 13. "Christmas present" (クリスマスのおくりもの, "Kurisumasu no Okurimono"); 14. "To my most beloved" (一番好きな人へ, "Ichiban Sukina Hito e"); 15. "The sisters and the bargain sale" (安売りと姉妹, "Yasuuri to Shimai"); 16. "Story of rich sisters?" (金持ち姉妹物語?, "Kanemochi Shimai Monogatari"); 17. "The one who waits" (待ち人, "Machibito")
2	February 17, 2006	4-09-157019-4
18. "Sakura's 40th year" (40年目の桜, "40 Nenme no Sakura"); 19. "Important Things" (大切なもの, "Taisetsu na Mono"); 20. "A hard working person" (がんばる人, "Ganbaru Hito"); 21. "A great plan for a thrilling lunch box" (ドキドキお弁当大作戦, "Doki Doki Obentō Taisakusen"); 22. "I can hear a song" (歌が聴こえる, "Uta ga Kikoeru"); 23. "A day of these poor sisters" (とある貧乏姉妹のいちにち, "Toaru Binbō Shimai no Ichnichi"); 24. "Special summer break" (特別な夏休み, "Tokubetsu na Natsuyasumi"); 25. "First..." (初めての…, "Hajimete no…"); 26. "Promise of the two" (2人の約束, "Futari no Yakusoku"); 27. "Separation" (離ればなれ, "Hanarebanare")
3	July 19, 2006	4-09-157059-3
28. "Sister and worry" (お姉さまと心配, "Onē-sama to Shinpai"); 29. "Sister and training" (お姉さまと修行, "Onē-sama to Shugyō"); 30. "sister and saving" (お姉さまと節約, "Onē-sama to Setsuyaku"); 31. "Time that doesn't return" (戻らない時間, "Modoranai Jikan"); 32. "Warmth of fingertip" (指先のぬくもり, "Yubisaki no Nukumori"); 33. "As long as you are here" (あなたがいれば, "Anata ga Ireba"); 34. "We as always, we from now on" (いつもの二人、これからの二人, "Itsumo no Futari, Kore kara no Futari"); 35. "Scenery of memory" (想い出の景色, "Omoide no Keshiki"); 36. "Blooming cherry blossom" (桜の咲くころ, "Sakura no Saku Koro")
4	December 19, 2006	4-09-157078-X
37. "Victory or defeat!" (勝負です！, "Shōbu desu!"); 38. "Teach me! Kyō Sensei!" (教えて！きょう先生！, "Oshiete! Kyō Sensei!"); 39. "Day after the rainy season" (梅雨明けの日, "Tsuyuake no Hi"); 40. "The two who are alike" (似ているふたり, "Nite Iru Futari"); 41. "Midsummer's night" (真夏の夜の…, "Manatsu no Yo no..."); 42. "Last present" (ラストプレゼント, "Rasuto Purezento"); 43. "sister and school life" (お姉様と学園生活, "Onē-sama to Gakuen Seikatsu"); 44. "End of summer" (夏の終わりに, "Natsu no Owari ni"); 45. "Balloon" (風船, "Fūsen"); 46. "See you again, sometime..." (いつか、また。, "Itsuka, Mata.")

=== Anime ===
==== Episodes ====
No.	Title	Original release date (Note: TV Asahi listed the air dates for the series on Thursday at 26:40, which is effectively Friday at 2:40 a.m. JST.)
1	"A Yukata, Fireworks, and Candy Apples Day love" Transliteration: "Yukata to hanabi to ringoame no hi" (Japanese: 浴衣と花火とりんご飴の日)	June 30, 2006
2	"A Day with the Landlord, A Watermelon, and Visits to the Hospital"; Transliteration: "Ouya san to suika to omimai no hi" (Japanese: 大家さんとスイカとお見舞いの日)	July 7, 2006
3	"A Day of Carrots, Lies, and the Echigoya Sisters"; Transliteration: "Ninjin to uso to Echigoya shimai no hi" (Japanese: にんじんと嘘と越後屋姉妹の日)	July 14, 2006
4	"A Day of Perfume, Asu, and Open House"; Transliteration: "Kousui to Asu to jugyou sankan no hi" (Japanese: 香水とあすと授業参観の日)	July 28, 2006
5	"A Day of the Apartment, Sakura Trees, and Moving"; Transliteration: "Apartment to Sakura to hikkoshi no hi" (Japanese: アパートと桜と引越しの日)	August 4, 2006
6	"A Day of Loneliness, Ginko, and Onee-Sama"; Transliteration: "Sabishisa to Ginko to Onee-sama no hi" (Japanese: さびしさと銀子とお姉さまの日)	August 18, 2006
7	"A Day of Chocolate, Jealousy, and Valentine"; Transliteration: "Yakimochi to choco to valentine no hi" (Japanese: ヤキモチとチョコとバレンタインの日)	August 25, 2006
8	"A Day of Guitars, Dreams, and a Music Teacher"; Transliteration: "Guitar to yume to uta no sensei no hi" (Japanese: ギターと夢と歌の先生の日)	September 1, 2006
9	"A Day of Emotions, Uneasiness and Cell Phones"; Transliteration: "Omoi to fuan to keitai denwa no hi" (Japanese: 想いと不安と携帯電話の日)	September 8, 2006
10	"A Day of Colds, Promises and Mother"; Transliteration: "Kaze to yakusoku to okaasan no hi" (Japanese: 風邪と約束とお母さんの日)	September 15, 2006

==== Music ====
Opening theme
"Shinkokyū" (深呼吸) by Splash Candy
Ending theme
"Soyokaze Life" (そよかぜらいふ) by Kanako Sakai
