= March Story =

Japanese manga series

- First tankōbon volume cover
- Genre: Action; Dark fantasy
- Manga
- Written by: Kim Hyung-min
- Illustrated by: Yang Kyung-il
- Published by: Shogakukan
- English publisher: NA: Viz Media
- Magazine: Monthly Sunday Gene-X
- Original run: December 19, 2007 – January 19, 2013
- Volumes: 5
- icon

March Story (stylized in all caps) is a Japanese manga series written by Kim Hyung-min and illustrated by Yang Kyung-il. It was serialized in Shogakukan's Monthly Sunday Gene-X from December 2007 to January 2013, with its chapters collected in five tankōbon volumes.

== Publication ==
Written by Kim Hyung-min and illustrated by Yang Kyung-il, March Story ran in Shogakukan's Monthly Sunday Gene-X from December 19, 2007, to January 19, 2013. Shogakukan collected its chapters in five tankōbon volumes, released from December 19, 2008, to April 19, 2013.

In North America, the series has been licensed by Viz Media. Viz Media released the five volumes between October 19, 2010, and March 18, 2014.

=== Volumes ===
No.	Original release date	Original ISBN	English release date	English ISBN
1	December 19, 2008	978-4-09-157156-4	October 19, 2010	978-1-4215-3755-9
2	December 18, 2009	978-4-09-157196-0	April 19, 2011	978-1-4215-3878-5
3	December 17, 2010	978-4-09-157249-3	October 11, 2011	978-1-4215-4079-5
4	December 19, 2011	978-4-09-157296-7	October 16, 2012	978-1-4215-4926-2
5	April 19, 2013	978-4-09-157340-7	March 18, 2014	978-1-4215-6435-7

== Reception ==
Deb Aoki from About.com wrote: "March Story features some dazzling and delicate, almost art nouveau-style art to go along with its often gruesome fables. This very grim fairy tale series will appeal to fans of Vertigo's Fables or Sandman, which makes it a good pick if you're aching for something new to read on All Hallow's Eve."
