= Yakuza Reincarnation =

Japanese manga series by Takeshi Natsuhara and Hiroki Miyashita

- Cover of the first tankōbon volume

任侠転生 –異世界のヤクザ姫– (Ninkyō Tensei –Isekai no Yakuza Hime–)
- Genre: Fantasy comedy; Isekai
- Manga
- Written by: Takeshi Natsuhara
- Illustrated by: Hiroki Miyashita
- Published by: Shogakukan
- English publisher: NA: Seven Seas Entertainment
- Imprint: Sunday GX Comics
- Magazine: Monthly Sunday Gene-X
- Original run: July 19, 2019 – present
- Volumes: 20
- icon

Yakuza Reincarnation (Note: Japanese: 任侠転生 –異世界のヤクザ姫–, Hepburn: Ninkyō Tensei –Isekai no Yakuza Hime–; lit. "Chivalrous Reincarnation: Yakuza Princess of Another World") is a Japanese manga series written by Takeshi Natsuhara and illustrated by Hiroki Miyashita. It has been serialized in Shogakukan's seinen manga magazine Monthly Sunday Gene-X since July 2019, with its chapters collected in 20 tankōbon volumes as of April 2026.

== Premise ==
An old school, good-hearted old man yakuza, Nagamasa Ryumatsu, is still hellbent on defending his turf when some young thugs ambush him and he ended up losing his life. He wakes up in a fantasy world in the body of a young princess, Sanaria Ryu Lundberg, retaining his back tattoo and strength. She takes the situation in stride, not bothering with any regal or ladylike behavior. Ryu might be out of place in this fantasy realm, but she may also be the only one who can save it by teaching this new world the meaning of yakuza honor.

== Publication ==
Written by Takeshi Natsuhara and illustrated by Hiroki Miyashita, Yakuza Reincarnation started in Shogakukan's seinen manga magazine Monthly Sunday Gene-X on July 19, 2019. Shogakukan has collected its chapters into individual tankōbon volumes. The first volume was released on January 17, 2020. As of April 17, 2026, twenty volumes have been released.

In July 2021, Seven Seas Entertainment announced that it had licensed the manga for English release in North America, with the first volume released on March 22, 2022.

=== Volumes ===
No.	Original release date	Original ISBN	English release date	English ISBN
1	January 17, 2020	978-4-09-157585-2	March 22, 2022	978-1-64827-840-2
2	June 19, 2020	978-4-09-157600-2	June 7, 2022	978-1-64827-841-9
3	November 19, 2020	978-4-09-157613-2	October 4, 2022	978-1-63858-671-5
4	February 19, 2021	978-4-09-157624-8	December 6, 2022	978-1-63858-849-8
5	May 19, 2021	978-4-09-157634-7	March 7, 2023	978-1-63858-988-4
6	August 19, 2021	978-4-09-157650-7	June 6, 2023	978-1-68579-585-6
7	December 17, 2021	978-4-09-157665-1	September 12, 2023	978-1-68579-854-3
8	April 19, 2022	978-4-09-157676-7	December 5, 2023	979-8-88843-067-5
9	August 19, 2022	978-4-09-157684-2	March 12, 2024	979-8-88843-331-7
10	December 19, 2022	978-4-09-157717-7	July 30, 2024	979-8-88843-674-5
11	April 18, 2023	978-4-09-157751-1	December 17, 2024	979-8-89160-205-2
12	August 18, 2023	978-4-09-157780-1	March 25, 2025	979-8-89160-570-1
13	December 19, 2023	978-4-09-157789-4	July 1, 2025	979-8-89373-010-4
14	April 18, 2024	978-4-09-157819-8	November 11, 2025	979-8-89373-569-7
15	August 19, 2024	978-4-09-157833-4	April 28, 2026	979-8-89373-826-1
16	December 19, 2024	978-4-09-157848-8	October 20, 2026	979-8-89561-585-0
17	April 17, 2025	978-4-09-157879-2	May 4, 2027	979-8-89765-664-6
18	August 19, 2025	978-4-09-157889-1	—	—
19	January 19, 2026	978-4-09-158211-9	—	—
20	April 17, 2026	978-4-09-158223-2	—	—

== Reception ==
By April 2026, the series had over 1.1 million copies in circulation.

== See also ==
- Densetsu no Head Shō, another manga series written by Takeshi Natsuhara
- Me and the Alien MuMu, another manga series illustrated by Hiroki Miyashita
