= Akihiro Ito =

Japanese manga artist

Akihiro Itō (伊藤 明弘, Itō Akihiro) is a Japanese manga artist born in Nagoya, Aichi Prefecture. He is known for his work on the manga series Geobreeders, serialized in the monthly manga magazine Young King Ours. Ito also worked on a second manga series, Wilderness, which was serialized in Sunday GX. Both titles have been on hiatus since 2009 when Itou reportedly stopped working due to an undisclosed illness. Currently, there are only 7 volumes available in the Wilderness series, and 16 volumes for Geobreeders. Itou did attempt to start Geobreeders Part 3, with the first three chapters appearing in Young King Ours between June and August. These chapters, and the remaining chapters for Wilderness have not yet been published in collected form.

Akihiro first wrote under the pen name BREN303, named after the Bren light machine gun. His earliest stories appeared in ecchi magazines like Lemon People. Several of these stories were later collected as Take the B Studio, and Take the B Studio - Complete.

Little is available on Akihiro's personal life in print. He did conduct something of an interview with Isamu Imakake, when Isamu was preparing to draw the Geobreeders Atomic Attack side story. An edited transcript of this interview appeared at the end of the AA manga. During which, Itou was quoted as saying: that he draws the Honda Vamos because it's easily recognizable, and that he can't draw vehicles with curved lines; that he's not really a gun nut or a military enthusiast - he just likes pictures of gun fights; and that the reason he draws cars in such great detail is that some of his fans demand it.

== Works ==
- Wilderness, (Shogakukan)
- Geobreeders, (Shōnen Gahosha)
- Gallop, (Daitosha), short story collection, written as BREN303
- Blue Gale, (Daitosha), giant robot short story collection
- Belle Starr, (Kadokawa), three volumes
  - Loosely based on the life of Belle Starr.
- Lawman, (Hakusensha), one volume
- Take the B Studio, (Koboshoten), collection of short stories written under the name BREN303
- Take the B Studio - Complete (Shōnen Gahousha), reprinting of Take the B Studio
- Battle Girl, (Tokumashoten), one volume
