= Gunbured × Sisters =

Japanese manga series

- First tankōbon volume cover

ガンバレッド×シスターズ (Ganbareddo × Shisutāzu)
- Genre: Action; Supernatural; Yuri
- Manga
- Written by: Wataru Mitogawa
- Published by: Shogakukan
- English publisher: NA: Seven Seas Entertainment
- Imprint: Sunday GX Comics
- Magazine: Monthly Sunday Gene-X
- Original run: September 19, 2019 – August 19, 2021
- Volumes: 4
- icon

Gunbured × Sisters (Japanese: ガンバレッド×シスターズ, Hepburn: Ganbareddo × Shisutāzu) is a Japanese manga series written and illustrated by Wataru Mitogawa. It was serialized in Shogakukan's seinen manga magazine Monthly Sunday Gene-X from September 2019 to August 2021, with its chapters collected in four tankōbon volumes. In North America, the manga was licensed for English release by Seven Seas Entertainment.

== Publication ==
Written and illustrated by Wataru Mitogawa, Gunbured × Sisters was serialized in Shogakukan's seinen manga magazine Monthly Sunday Gene-X from September 19, 2019, to August 19, 2021. Shogakukan collected its chapters in four tankōbon volumes, released from March 19, 2020, to November 19, 2021.

In North America, the manga was licensed for English release by Seven Seas Entertainment and released under their Ghost Ship imprint for mature readers.

=== Volumes ===
No.	Original release date	Original ISBN	English release date	English ISBN
1	March 19, 2020	978-4-09-157588-3	March 22, 2022	978-1-63858-163-5
2	August 19, 2020	978-4-09-157604-0	July 5, 2022	978-1-63858-285-4
3	April 19, 2021	978-4-09-157627-9	January 17, 2023	978-1-63858-740-8
4	November 19, 2021	978-4-09-157661-3	April 11, 2023	978-1-68579-487-3

== See also ==
- My Girlfriend Is 8 Meters Tall, another manga series by the same author
