= Blade of the Phantom Master =

Japanese manhwa/manga series

- Cover of the second volume of the Japanese edition
- Genre: Action; Dark fantasy; Epic fantasy
- Manga
- Written by: Youn In-wan
- Illustrated by: Yang Kyung-il
- Published by: Daewon C.I. (South Korea); Shogakukan (Japan)
- Magazine: Young Champ (South Korea); Monthly Sunday Gene-X (Japan)
- Original run: March 19, 2001 – August 18, 2007
- Volumes: 17 + 1 extra
- Anime film
- Directed by: Jōji Shimura; Ahn Tae-kun
- Produced by: Bunsho Kajiya; Shukichi Kanda; Yang Jee-hye; Lee Sang-don; Lee Dong-ki
- Written by: Youn In-wan; Mitsuru Hongo; Jōji Shimura
- Music by: Kow Otani
- Studio: Oriental Light and Magic; Character Plan
- Released: December 4, 2004
- Runtime: 87 minutes
- icon

Blade of the Phantom Master (Japanese: 新暗行御史, Hepburn: Shin Angyō Onshi; 'New Secret Royal Agent') / (Korean: 신암행어사; RR: Sinamhaengeosa) is a South Korean-Japanese manga series written by Youn In-wan and illustrated by Yang Kyung-il. The story takes place in a world reminiscent of ancient Korea, and follows the Korean-folktale-inspired adventures of Munsu, one of the few remaining guardians against corruption and tyranny, as he seeks to find those responsible for the destruction of his country. It was serialized from 2001 to 2007 in South Korea (as Shin Amhaengosa) and in Japan (as Shin Angyō Onshi), and was adapted into an anime theatrical-release film in 2004 in a first-of-its-kind collaboration between Japan and South Korea. In 2007, an English-language version of the film was released in the United States by ADV Films, under the title Blade of the Phantom Master. In 2008, the anime became one of over 30 ADV titles transferred to Funimation.

== Synopsis ==
The series is set in the fictional land of Jushin, which draws inspiration from feudal Korea. The story follows Munsu, one of the last Amheng Osa (암행어사) (Angyō Onshi (暗行御史) in Japanese), royal agents who travel in disguise to punish corruption and administer justice. After Jushin's collapse into warring fiefdoms ruled by tyrants, Munsu wanders the land confronting the resulting chaos. Though his missions appear episodic, he is systematically tracking the individual responsible for assassinating Jushin's king—his best friend—an act that precipitated the kingdom's fall. As he closes in on the conspirator, Aji Tae, Munsu encounters former comrades now serving his enemy and confronts his own culpability in the king's death.

Amheng osa carry bronze medallions inscribed with one to three horses, indicating their rank and magical capability. Third mahai (삼마패) (San Mahai (三馬牌) in Japanese) medallions, the most powerful, enable advanced magic like summoning and regeneration. These medallions function only for those with strong conviction for justice. Each Amheng Osa is accompanied by a bodyguard called a Sando, typically a formidable warrior or intelligent beast.

== Characters ==
Munsu (文秀) (Note: Korean: 문수)
A former general and the third mahai angyo onshi from the fallen kingdom of Jushin. Munsu is a figure often at odds with the virtuous ideals associated with his title, whose methods frequently involve deceit and extreme violence. He suffers from a curse resembling asthma, alleviated by an inhaler-like charm, which he took from his lover Kye Wol Hyang who died regardless. After using a mandrake extract to nullify his curse but leaving him with only days to live, he rallies his allies to assault the castle of his sworn enemy, Aji Tae. Munsu succeeds in killing Aji Tae but subsequently dies from his ailments, and in death is reunited with Kye Wol Hyang and his departed friends.
Chun Hyang (春香, Chunyan) (Note: Korean: 춘향)
A highly skilled fighter known as Sando (山道), (Note: Korean: 산도) she serves as Munsu's bodyguard. After her lover died informing Munsu of her capture and brainwashing by a corrupt lord, Munsu freed her, and she adopted the title "Sando" to honor her lost love. Despite her immense combat prowess, which contrasts with a quiet and moral demeanor, she often clashes with Munsu's methods. She temporarily leaves to gain greater power and is later manipulated into serving Aji Tae. During Munsu's final assault, she initially fights him but regains her memories and helps defeat Aji Tae. After Munsu's death, she continues to travel alone, using her skills to fight evil.
Bang Ja (房子, Panja) (Note: Korean: 방자)
A well-intentioned servant and former apprentice to a first mahai onshi who becomes Munsu's unwilling attendant after his master's death. He holds strong ideals about the virtuous nature amen osa should embody, making him frequently appalled by Munsu's methods. A third-rate magician who summons animals, he is often bullied and manipulated by Munsu. He is responsible for using an acupuncture needle that saves Munsu's life but leaves him in a comatose state. After Munsu's death, Bang Ja recommits himself to fighting for the ideals his master once represented.
Kye Wol Hyang (桂月香, Keoru Hyan) (Note: Korean: 계월향)
Kye Wol Hyang is Munsu's deceased lover and the sister of Hong Gildong. A childhood friend of both Munsu and Hae Mo Su, she suffered from an illness resembling asthma that was alleviated by an inhaler-like charm. Unable to bear her suffering, Munsu asked Aji Tae to transfer her illness to him through a ritual. Despite this, Kye Wol Hyang ultimately committed suicide, though Munsu continues to blame himself for her death, even when questioned by her brother.
Won Sul (元述, Wonsuru) (Note: Korean: 원술)
A master swordsman from Jushin and Munsu's former subordinate who serves Aji Tae after the kingdom's fall. His weapon, Saruhyondo, is an invisible blade forged from his killing intent, capable of taking any form. Although defeated and killed by Sando, Wonsul is resurrected by Aji Tae into a decaying, undead state, making him exceedingly difficult to kill. He later serves as Munsu's temporary bodyguard. When Munsu launches his final assault, Aji Tae transforms Wonsul into a monstrous form. Munsu recognizes his old comrade and grants him a final death by destroying him in an explosion. They are later reunited in the afterlife.
Aji Tae (阿志泰, Ajite) (Note: Korean: 아지태)
A former scholar from Jushin whom Munsu holds responsible for the kingdom's destruction. Once Munsu's second-in-command, he now commands the loyalty of many of Jushin's former warriors through a combination of coercion and charisma. His motives remain enigmatic, but he possesses vast magical abilities, including resurrection, teleportation, and lethal spells. Having conquered most of the former Jushin territories, he rules with a formidable army comprising supernatural allies, undead soldiers, and powerful dark magicians.

== Production ==
The premise and characters of Blade of the Phantom Master are heavily inspired by classic Korean tales, particularly the tragic, lesser-known version of The Legend of Chun Hyang, which drew criticism from some Korean readers for its dark tone. Youn also incorporated elements from stories such as amhaengeosa and historical figures like Heo Jun. The character Munsu is based on the historical Park Mun-su, a military officer and amheng osa from the Joseon Dynasty known for punishing corruption and defending the kingdom. Sando draws from Ju Non-gae, a figure celebrated for sacrificing herself to kill a Japanese general during the Seven-Year War. Youn initially worried the concept of amheng osa might feel foreign to Japanese audiences, but discovered similar historical roles across cultures, reinforcing the universality of combating corruption. He also acknowledged influence from Natsuki Sumeragi's manga Richō Angyōki, admiring its historical accuracy despite it being a foreign interpretation.

== Media ==
=== Comic ===
The Blade of the Phantom Master comic was serialized in Japan in Shogakukan's seinen manga magazine Monthly Sunday Gene-X from March 19, 2001, (Note: It started in the April 2001 issue of the magazine (cover date), released on March 19 of the same year.) to August 18, 2007. It was also published as manhwa in South Korea's Young Champ. The work was collected into 17 graphic novel volumes, which were published by Shogakukan in Japan and Daiwon C.I. in South Korea. As of 2005, these collections have sold over 2 million copies between the two countries. Translation of the comic from Korean to Japanese was provided by Manabu Okazaki. Many chapters included special author's notes to give background on Korean folktales and historical figures referenced in the story, and to explain instances in which the author chose to deviate from generally accepted fact in his portrayals. For instance, in volume 4, Youn provided information on Hwanung, a sage from the Korean legend, Dangun Shinhwa. He feared his portrayal of Hwanung as a summoned creature dressed in S&M gear might cause misunderstandings among readers of the comic, and explained that his development of the character in the comic was influenced by interesting but unsupported statements from the internet, whereas the Hwanung of legend holds a very high status in Korea, on a par with "that of Jesus Christ in Western society."

Japanese editions of the comic volumes also included omake-style humorous shorts detailing a variety of Youn and Yang's cross cultural and comic writing adventures, entitled "From Korea – Hello!!" Youn and Yang maintained their residences in Incheon, South Korea throughout most of the writing and publication of the series, often requiring the services of translators for dealings with their Japanese editor, Akinobu Natsume, especially early on, and necessitating multiple business trips to Japan. Youn studied Japanese and his proficiency improved as the comic progressed. He admitted, however, that it "took two hours while staring at a dictionary" to read his first Japanese-language fan letter.

Japanese editions of volume 8 of the comic were packaged with a bonus booklet entitled Osa-logy. It contained a short side story by the series authors, plus humorous comic shorts by guest authors and artists. Also included were interviews between author Youn and actress Yoon Son-ha, and between Youn and the manga authors Clamp. A guidebook entitled Amenosa, This Reality and Mission (アメンオサ、その真実と使命 Amenosa, sono shinjitsu to shimei, 공식 가이드북) was also published, containing color art galleries by artist Yang, plus story summaries and character data. A "gaiden"-style volume of two side stories was also released for sale.

Since its original releases in South Korea and Japan, the comic has been licensed and published in French as Le Nouvel Angyo Onshi by Pika Édition, in Hungarian as Árnybíró by Mangafan, in German as Shin Angyo Onshi by Carlsen Comics, in Thai as Dtòo Laa Gaan Tá-mil Chà-bàp Pí-sèt (ตุลาการทมิฬ ฉบับพิเศษ) by Vibulkij, in Indonesian as Shin Angyo Onshi by Level Comics, and in Chinese by Jonesky (Hong Kong) and Sharp Point Press (Taiwan).

=== Animated film ===
In 2004, Japanese studio Oriental Light and Magic and Korean studio Character Plan collaborated to create an animated film adaptation of the comic, entitled Phantom Master: Dark Hero from the Ruined Empire. The project represented the first time Korean and Japanese creators had ever collaborated on an animated film, and funding was shared by sources from both nations. It was distributed by The Klockworx in Japan and Cinema Service in Korea. The film was co-directed by Ahn Tae-gun and Jōji Shimura, and produced by Yang Jae-hye, Lee Sang-don, Bunsho Kajiya, Lee Don-ki, and Shukuchi Kanda. It featured a musical score from composer Kow Otani and theme songs performed by BoA. Vocal tracks were recorded in both Korean and Japanese, though Korean actor Ji Sung's narration was retained in its original language for the Japanese release and augmented with native subtitles. Character Plan president Yang Jee-hye said his company was able to learn new skills and technologies, both of which have been maintained during Japan's long history of film-making, from Oriental Light and Magic, who completed about 70% of the work on the film.

Phantom Master: Dark Hero from the Ruined Empire was shown at the Sixth Bucheon International Animation Festival, November 6, 2004, in Bucheon, South Korea, at which it served as the opening film. It was released into theaters simultaneously in Japan and Korea on November 26, 2004, and had an encore run at the Seoul Ani Cinema for three weeks beginning February 17, 2005. Its North American debut was at the Fantasia Festival in Montreal, Quebec, Canada on July 15, 2005, where it was shown in Korean with English subtitles. ADV Films released the movie to DVD in North America in 2007, with a choice of Japanese or English audio and optional English subtitles. The movie has also been locally released in Poland as Ostatni Strażnik Magii by Vision Film's Anime Gate imprint and in Russia as Povelitel' Prizrakov (Russian: Повелитель призраков, lit. Lord of the Ghosts) by MC Entertainment. The film was re-released on DVD by Funimation Entertainment on June 30, 2009, under the title Blade of the Phantom Master: Shin Angyo Onshi with the ADV movie trailer for the film as a special feature. The film features the English language track and the Japanese language track with English subtitles.

The film is an adaptation of early comic chapters, covering the stories of Munsu's desert encounter with Mong Ryong, his subsequent quest to free Sando, and one of the pair's early adventures together.

=== Webtoon ===
On November 18, 2017, Blade of the Phantom Master began serialization as a webtoon on Naver Webtoon, with updates three times per week. This reboot features a complete visual overhaul, reinterpreting the original material with new coloring and panel layouts adapted to the webtoon format. The series was produced in collaboration with YLAB as part of their shared universe project, Super String.
