= Densetsu no Head Shō =

Japanese manga series

- First tankōbon volume cover

伝説の頭(ヘッド) 翔 (Densetsu no Heddo Shō)
- Genre: Comedy; Martial arts; Yankī
- Manga
- Written by: Takeshi Natsuhara
- Illustrated by: Takashi Hamori
- Published by: Kodansha
- Imprint: Shōnen Magazine Comics
- Magazine: Weekly Shōnen Magazine
- Original run: July 23, 2003 – July 13, 2005
- Volumes: 11
- Television drama
- Directed by: Takashi Sumida; Keisuke Kondō; Hisashi Ueda
- Written by: Kazunao Furuya
- Music by: Alisa Okehazama
- Original network: TV Asahi
- Original run: July 19, 2024 – September 6, 2024
- Episodes: 8
- icon

Densetsu no Head Shō (Japanese: 伝説の頭(ヘッド) 翔, Hepburn: Densetsu no Heddo Shō; "Legendary Boss, Sho") is a Japanese manga series written by Takeshi Natsuhara and illustrated by Takashi Hamori. It was serialized in Kodansha's shōnen manga magazine Weekly Shōnen Magazine from July 2003 to July 2005, with its chapters collected in eleven tankōbon volumes. An eight-episode television drama adaptation was broadcast on TV Asahi from July to September 2024.

== Media ==
=== Manga ===
Written by Takeshi Natsuhara and illustrated by Takashi Hamori, Densetsu no Head Shō was serialized in Kodansha's shōnen manga magazine Weekly Shōnen Magazine from July 23, 2003, to July 13, 2005. (Note: It finished in the magazine's 33th issue of 2005, released on July 13 of that same year.) Kodansha collected its chapters in eleven tankōbon volumes, released from December 17, 2003, to August 17, 2005.

=== Drama ===
An eight-episode television drama adaptation was broadcast on TV Asahi from July 19 to September 6, 2024.

== See also ==
- Yakuza Reincarnation, another manga series written by Takeshi Natsuhara
