= Izumi Kazuto =

Japanese manga artist

Izumi Kazuto かずと いずみ
- Born: December 3, 1979 (age 46) Ota, Tokyo, Japan
- Areas: Writing scripts and art
- Pseudonym: Izumi (いずみ)
- Notable works: Binbō Shimai Monogatari

Izumi Kazuto (かずと いずみ, Kazuto Izumi) is a Japanese manga artist.

== Biography ==
She is currently living in Tokyo, but was born in Ota, Tokyo.

== Works ==
=== Manga ===
- Choco Parfait (ちょこパフェ), published in Manga Time from 2003 to 2004.
  - Note: She published the manga under the name Izumi (いずみ).
- Volume 1: ISBN 978-4-8322-7509-6
- Volume 2: ISBN 978-4-8322-7540-9

- Binbō Shimai Monogatari (貧乏姉妹物語)
  - Published by Shogakukan and is serialized in Sunday GX from February 2004 till January 2006 with a total of 4 volumes.
- Volume 1: ISBN 978-4-09-157341-4
- Volume 2: ISBN 978-4-09-157019-2
- Volume 3: ISBN 978-4-09-157059-8
- Volume 4: ISBN 978-4-09-157078-9

=== Artbooks ===
Yorimichi Drop (よりみちドロップ)

- Published in March 2007.
  - ISBN 9784757734470
