= Youn In-wan =

South Korean manhwa writer (born 1976)

- Born: July 27, 1976 (age 50)
- Notable works: Blade of the Phantom Master

Korean name
- Hangul: 윤인완
- Hanja: 尹仁完
- RR: Yun Inwan
- MR: Yun Inwan

Youn In-wan (Korean: 윤인완, born July 27, 1976) is a South Korean manhwa writer. In Japan, he is known for his work Blade of the Phantom Master. Prior to that, he worked on the manhwa Island (아일랜드) with illustrator Yang Kyung-il. After the publication of the seventh and last volume of Island, he wrote a novel, The Island, in which he described the past of the characters in his manhwa. He has also been featured in the Korean weekly magazine Deja Vu (데자뷰).

He is known for adding comments at the end of every chapter in Blade of the Phantom Master. In omake style shorts, he is represented as being a lean bespectacled character who is a brash loud mouth, and who is often shown leading his quiet illustrator Yang around.

After the success of their one shot Akuma Bengoshi Kukabara (悪魔弁護士Kukabara; lit. 'Devil Advocate Kukabara'), they have begun to work on Defense Devil for the weekly manga magazine Shōnen Sunday. Youn was a part time Japanese professor for the Hankuk University of Foreign Studies from 2011 to 2015, and started as a producer for company YLab in 2010. It was reported in 2020 that Yoon will be the chief creative officer for Line Manga.

== Career ==
=== Korea ===
Youn debuted in 1996 with the manhwa series Bom (봄, Spring) in the Korean weekly magazine Deja Vu (데자뷰).

=== Japan ===
Youn debuted in Japan in December, 1999 with The Fools in a Japanese youth magazine Weekly Young Sunday. He serialized his work Blade of the Phantom Master from 2001 to 2007 at the magazine Monthly Sunday Gene-X.
