= Me and the Alien MuMu =

Japanese manga series and its adaptation(s)

- First tankōbon volume cover

宇宙人ムームー (Uchūjin Mūmū)
- Genre: Science fiction; Surreal comedy
- Manga
- Written by: Hiroki Miyashita
- Published by: Shōnen Gahōsha
- English publisher: NA: Kodama Tales
- Imprint: Young King Comics
- Magazine: Young King OURs
- Original run: June 28, 2019 – May 30, 2026
- Volumes: 10
- Anime television series
- Directed by: Tomoya Takahashi
- Written by: Keiichirō Ōchi
- Music by: Kuricorder Quartet
- Studio: OLM Division 2
- Licensed by: SEA: Tropics Entertainment
- Original network: Tokyo MX, BS11, MBS, GTV, MRO, AT-X
- Original run: April 10, 2025 – September 18, 2025
- Episodes: 24
- icon

Me and the Alien MuMu (宇宙人ムームー, Uchūjin Mūmū; lit. 'Alien Mumu') is a Japanese manga series written and illustrated by Hiroki Miyashita. It was originally published as a one-shot published in Shōnen Gahōsha's Young King OURs magazine in April 2019. It was later serialized in the same magazine from June that same year up until May 2026. An anime television series adaptation produced by OLM aired from April to September 2025.

== Plot ==
Sakurako is a university student living in the Tokyo metropolitan area. One day, Mūmū, a cat-like alien, appears before her. Mūmū comes from an alien race that was previously technologically advanced, but lost this knowledge. Finding interest in household appliances, Mūmū, along with other aliens, asks Sakurako and others for help in studying Earthly appliances to regain that knowledge.

== Characters ==
Sakurako Umeyashiki (梅屋敷 桜子, Umeyashiki Sakurako)
Voiced by: Momo Harumi
A university student living in Machida, Tokyo. She has a shy personality.
Mūmū (ムームー)
Voiced by: Etsuko Kozakura
A cat-like alien who came to Earth after his civilization lost its knowledge regarding technology. He gains an interest in Earth's appliances and technology and wants to study them. He has a red tie.
Decimal (デシマル, Deshimaru)
Voiced by: Yasuyuki Kase
Another cat-like alien from the same race as Mūmū, who comes to Earth. Unlike Mūmū, who is fascinated about Earth and its appliances, Decimal is interested in Earth's infrastructure, but sees humans as inferior to their own race.
Akihiro Tsurumi (鶴見 アキヒロ, Tsurumi Akihiro)
Voiced by: Gakuto Kajiwara
A handsome man who goes to the same university as Sakurako. As he is an animal lover, he develops an interest in Mūmū and the other cat-like aliens.
Miwa Samezu (鮫洲 美輪, Samezu Miwa)
Voiced by: Yuriko Hibi
A woman who goes to the same university as Sakurako. She is particular about her appearance. She has feelings for Akihiro.
Wataru Tenkubashi (天空橋 わたる, Tenkubashi Wataru)
Voiced by: Hidenobu Kiuchi
Tamotsu Rokugō (六郷 保, Rokugō Tamotsu)
Voiced by: Kentarō Kumagai
Sonoko Kagetsu (花月 園子, Kagetsu Sonoko)
Voiced by: Yukiyo Fujii
Siberia (シベリア, Shiberia)
Voiced by: Karin Takahashi
A white cat-like alien who belongs to the same race as Mūmū and Decimal.
Junichirō Anamori (穴守 順一郎, Anamori Junichirō)
Voiced by: Katsuyuki Konishi

== Media ==
=== Manga ===
Written and illustrated by Hiroki Miyashita, Me and the Alien MuMu was originally published as a one-shot in Shōnen Gahōsha's Young King OURs magazine on April 30, 2019. It began serialization in the same magazine two months later on June 28. The series ended serialization on May 30, 2026. Its chapters were collected into ten tankōbon volumes released from April 30, 2020, to July 30, 2026.

In September 2025, Kodama Tales announced that they had licensed the series for English publication beginning in February 2026.

No.	Original release date	Original ISBN	English release date	English ISBN
1	April 30, 2020	978-4-7859-6662-1	February 1, 2026	978-1-9665-2302-4
2	January 29, 2021	978-4-7859-6847-2	April 1, 2026	978-1-9665-2319-2
3	July 29, 2021	978-4-7859-6967-7	June 1, 2026	978-1-9665-2324-6
4	May 30, 2022	978-4-7859-7145-8	August 1, 2026	978-1-9665-2332-1
5	February 28, 2023	978-4-7859-7335-3	—	—
6	October 30, 2023	978-4-7859-7523-4	—	—
7	May 30, 2024	978-4-7859-7674-3	—	—
8	April 30, 2025	978-4-7859-7923-2	—	—
9	September 30, 2025	978-4-7859-8038-2	—	—
10	July 30, 2026	978-4-7859-8250-8	—	—

=== Anime ===
An anime television series adaptation was announced by Pony Canyon on November 28, 2024. It is produced by OLM and directed by Tomoya Takahashi, with Keiichirō Ōchi handling series composition, Kenji Ōta designing the characters, and Kuricorder Quartet composing the music. The series aired from April 10 to September 18, 2025, on Tokyo MX and other networks. (Note: Tokyo MX and BS11 lists the series premiere on April 9, 2025, at 24:00, which is effectively April 10 at midnight JST.) The first opening theme song is "Fushigi na Kimi" (ふしぎなきみ; Mysterious You), performed by Sabasister, while the first ending theme song is "Sayonara Jinrui" (さよなら人類; Farewell Humanity (a cover of the song of the same name by Tama)), performed by Momo Harumi and Etsuko Kozakura as their respective characters. The second opening theme song is "Move Move", performed by Ako, while the second ending theme song is "Subarashii Hibi" (すばらしい日々), performed by Harumi and Kozakura. Tropics Entertainment licensed the series in Southeast Asia for streaming on Tropics Anime Asia's YouTube channel.

==== Episodes ====
No.	Title	Directed by (Note: Production staff information is taken from the ending credits of each episode.)	Written by	Storyboarded by	Original release date
1	"Mumu and the Microwave"; Transliteration: "Mūmū to Denshi Renji" (Japanese: ムームーと電子レンジ)	Yū Takahashi	Keiichirō Ōchi	Tomoya Takahashi	April 10, 2025
2	"Mumu and the Vacuum Cleaner"; Transliteration: "Mūmū to Sōjiki" (Japanese: ムームーと掃除機)	Kentarō Fujita	Keiichirō Ōchi	Yū Takahashi	April 17, 2025
3	"MuMu and the Automatic Door"; Transliteration: "Mūmū to Jidō Doa" (Japanese: ムームーと自動ドア)	Takeyuki Sadohara	Yūji Kobayashi	Tetsuya Kawaishi	April 24, 2025
4	"Tenkubashi and Wireless Power Transmission"; Transliteration: "Tenkūkyō to Waiyaresu Sōden" (Japanese: 天空橋とワイヤレス送電)	Yuki Kusakabe	Yuka Yamada	Hiroyuki Fukushima	May 1, 2025
5	"MuMu and the Air Conditioner"; Transliteration: "Mūmū to Eakon" (Japanese: ムームーとエアコン)	Gi-Seop Lee	Takamitsu Kōno	Shigetaka Ikeda	May 8, 2025
6	"MuMu and the Rice Cooker"; Transliteration: "Mūmū to Takuhanki" (Japanese: ムームーと炊飯器)	Yū Takahashi	Keiichirō Ōchi	Yū Takahashi	May 15, 2025
7	"Samezu and the Thermometer"; Transliteration: "Samezu to Taionkei" (Japanese: 鮫洲と体温計)	Akira Shimizu	Keiichirō Ōchi	Tomoko Iwasaki	May 22, 2025
8	"MuMu and the Power Outlet"; Transliteration: "Mūmū to Konsento" (Japanese: ムームーとコンセント)	Kentarō Fujita	Yuka Yamada	Shigetaka Ikeda	May 29, 2025
9	"MuMu and the TV"; Transliteration: "Mūmū to Terebi" (Japanese: ムームーとテレビ)	Ryōhei Endō	Yūji Kobayashi	Hiroyuki Fukushima	June 5, 2025
10	"MuMu and the Camera"; Transliteration: "Mūmū to Kamera" (Japanese: ムームーとカメラ)	Shigeharu Takahashi	Takamitsu Kōno	Hiroyuki Fukushima	June 12, 2025
11	"Mumu and the Air Purifier"; Transliteration: "Mūmū to Kūki Seijōki" (Japanese: ムームーと空気清浄機)	Won-Hoi Kim	Yuka Yamada	Shigeharu Takahashi	June 19, 2025
12	"Mumu and the Battery"; Transliteration: "Mūmū to Kandenchi" (Japanese: ムームーと乾電池)	Yuki Kusakabe	Yūji Kobayashi	Tomoko Iwasaki	June 26, 2025
13	"Sakurako and the Culture Festival"; Transliteration: "Sakurako to Bunkasai" (Japanese: 桜子と文化祭)	Kōji Fukazawa	Keiichirō Ōchi	Kōji Fukazawa	July 3, 2025
14	"Anamori and GPS"; Transliteration: "Anamori to GPS" (Japanese: 穴守とGPS)	Noriyoshi Sasaki	Takamitsu Kōno	Noriyoshi Sasaki	July 10, 2025
15	"Mumu and Photoynthesis"; Transliteration: "Mūmū to Kōgōsei" (Japanese: ムームーと光合成)	Ryōhei Endō	Yuka Yamada	Shigeharu Takahashi	July 17, 2025
16	"Mumu and the Action Camera"; Transliteration: "Mūmū to Akushon Kamera" (Japanese: ムームーとアクションカメラ)	Kentarō Fujita	Yūji Kobayashi	Satoshi Shimizu	July 24, 2025
17	"Mumu and the Refrigerator"; Transliteration: "Mūmū to Reizōko" (Japanese: ムームーと冷蔵庫)	Shigeharu Takahashi	Keiichirō Ōchi	Hiroshi Kotaki	July 31, 2025
18	"Rokugo and the EMS"; Transliteration: "Rokugō to EMS" (Japanese: 六郷とEMS)	Yūki Nagai	Takamitsu Kōno	Kentarō Fujita	August 7, 2025
19	"Tenkubashi, Lies, and Video Tape"; Transliteration: "Tenkubashi to Uso to Bideotēpu" (Japanese: 天空橋と嘘とビデオテープ)	Noriyoshi Sasaki	Yūji Kobayashi	Shigeharu Takahashi	August 14, 2025
20	"Akihiro and the Tankless Toilet"; Transliteration: "Akihiro to Tankuresu Toire" (Japanese: アキヒロとタンクレストイレ)	Won-Hoi Kim	Yuka Yamada	Satoshi Shimizu	August 21, 2025
21	"Sonoko and USB"; Transliteration: "Sonoko to USB" (Japanese: 園子とUSB)	Kentarō Fujita	Takamitsu Kōno	Tomoko Iwasaki	August 28, 2025
22	"Mumu and the Retro Appliances"; Transliteration: "Mūmū to Retoro Kaden" (Japanese: ムームーとレトロ家電)	Ryōhei Endō & Rika Mashiko	Yuka Yamada	Hiroshi Kotaki	September 4, 2025
23	"Mumu, Sakurako, and the Risk of Apocalypse"; Transliteration: "Mūmū to Sakurako to Shūmatsu no Kiki" (Japanese: ムームーと桜子と終末の危機)	Shigeharu Takahashi & Noriyoshi Sasaki	Keiichirō Ōchi	Satoshi Shimizu	September 11, 2025
24	"Mumu, Sakurako, and the Day the Earth Stood Still"; Transliteration: "Mūmū to Sakurako to Chikyū ga Teishi Suru Hi" (Japanese: ムームーと桜子と地球が停止する日)	Noriyoshi Sasaki & Tomoya Takahashi	Keiichirō Ōchi	Kōji Fukuzawa & Tomoya Takahashi	September 18, 2025

== See also ==
- Yakuza Reincarnation, another manga series illustrated by Hiroki Miyashita
