= Yuriy Rastvorov =

Russian double agent

Yuriy Aleksandrovich Rastvorov (Russian: Юрий Александрович Растворов; 11 July 1921 – 19 January 2004) known after his defection under the alias of Martin F. Simons, was a Russian former KGB agent and later CIA agent who defected from the Soviet Union to the west while in Japan in 1954. He was sentenced to death in absentia by the Supreme Court of the Soviet Union.

== Biography ==
Yuriy Aleksandrovich Rastvorov was born on 11 July 1921 in Dmitriyev, Kursk Oblast. His father served as a Red Army commander and fought during the Russian Civil War later the military commissar of the Tagansky District in Moscow.

In 1939, Rastvorov was conscripted into the military and participated in the Soviet occupation of the Baltic states in Latvia and Lithuania. In December 1940 Rastvorov was reassigned to learn Japanese in Moscow. There he became a member of the GRU, and after graduating in 1943, he recruited to the KGB as a codebreaker in the Russian Far East. From 1944–1946 he received an intelligence education in Moscow until he was sent to Tokyo under the cover as a translator. Later that same year, he was recalled to Moscow for a security check, relating to accusations of his grandfather being a kulak. He stayed in Moscow until 1950, when he was sent back to Tokyo with the mission to recruit agents at a tennis club.

In early 1954, Rastvorov was once again recalled, but at the time when a purge of KGB members, such as Lavrentiy Beria, in the wake of Joseph Stalin's death, was going on. Fearing he would be killed as part of this culling, he defected to the US from his post in Tokyo. After being interrogated on Okinawa, he was able to get asylum in the US and assume a new identity under the name Martin Simons. His defection was publicly announced in August 1954, and later at the urging of the CIA, he wrote four articles for Life magazine. He died in 2004.
