= Monthly Sunday Gene-X =

Japanese manga magazine

Monthly Sunday GX
- Cover of the magazine's first issue (August 2000), featuring Spriggan: First Mission
- Editor: Akinobu Natsume
- Categories: Seinen manga
- Frequency: Monthly
- Circulation: 6,533; (July–September 2026)
- First issue: July 19, 2000
- Company: Shogakukan
- Country: Japan
- Language: Japanese
- Website: Official website

Monthly Sunday Gene-X (Japanese: 月刊サンデーGENE-X, Hepburn: Gekkan Sandē Jenekkusu), often abbreviated as Sunday GX (サンデーGX), is a seinen manga magazine published by Shogakukan. Like many other manga magazines, it is an "anthology magazine", with each issue featuring new chapters of several manga series. The series are also published in tankōbon form under the Sunday GX Comics imprint.

== History ==
The magazine's title, Monthly Sunday Gene-X, refers to its mission as a manga magazine for Generation X. The first issue was published on July 19, 2000, and new issues are published on the 19th day of each month — not necessarily on a Sunday. The title uses the word "Sunday" more as a trademark or genre name, shared with its sister magazines Weekly Shōnen Sunday and Weekly Young Sunday.

Shogakukan also publishes manga series previously featured in Sunday GX as paperback tankōbon (compilation volumes) under the imprint Sunday GX Comics.

== Current series ==
Title	Author	Premiered	Ref.
The Apothecary Diaries: Maomao's Notes from the Inner Palace (薬屋のひとりごと～猫猫の後宮謎解き手帳～)	Hyūganatsu, Minoji Kurata	September 2017	
Black Lagoon	Rei Hiroe	May 2002	
Black Lagoon Eda: Initial Stage (BLACK LAGOON エダ -Initial Stage-)	Hajime Yamamura	May 2022	
Black Lagoon: Sawyer the Cleaner – Dismemberment! Gore Gore Girl (BLACK LAGOON 掃除屋ソーヤー解体！ゴアゴア娘)	Tatsuhiko Ida	October 2019	
Bonnō Saiyūki (煩悩☆西遊記)	Crystal na Yōsuke	March 2020	
Cosmos	Ryuhei Tamura	April 2023	
Destro 016 (デストロ016)	Keitaro Takahashi	May 2021	
Hinmin, Seihitsu, Daifugou (貧民、聖櫃、大富豪)	Keitaro Takahashi	January 2017	
Hoero Pen RRR (吼えろペンRRR)	Kazuhiko Shimamoto	January 2021	
JyaJya (ジャジャ)	Eno Akira	October 2000	
Yakuza Reincarnation (任侠転生 -異世界のヤクザ姫-)	Natsuhara Takeshi, Miyashita Hiroki	August 2019 (Note: Combined August and September issue)	
Zom 100: Bucket List of the Dead (ゾン100 ～ゾンビになるまでにしたい100のこと～)	Haro Aso, Koutarou Takata	November 2018	

== Former series ==
=== 2000s ===
Title	Author	Premiered	Finished	Ref.
Advent	Yumiko Harao	June 2003	August 2004	
Ai Kagi (あいカギ)	Sukune Inugami	November 2009	September 2011	
Angel Kōkō (エンジェル高校)	Sukune Inugami	September 2007	July 2009	
Asuka @ Miraikei (アスカ@未来系)	Kazuhiko Shimamoto	February 2009	July 2010	
Bijo de Yajū (美女で野獣)	Tatsuhiko Ida	April 2002	March 2006	
Binbō Shimai Monogatari (貧乏姉妹物語)	Izumi Kazuto	May 2004	November 2006	
Blade of the Phantom Master (新暗行御史)	Youn In-wan, Yang Kyung-il	April 2001	September 2007	
Code-EX	Ichirō Sakaki, Yumiko Harao	July 2007	July 2008	
Dandelion (ダンデライオン)	Naoyuki Ochiai	September 2000	April 2001	
Dareka ga Kakkou to Naku (誰かがカッコゥと啼く)	Tatsuhiko Ida	November 2006	June 2008	
Destruction Princess (デス・プリ)	Hebisaku Yoshida	November 2004	November 2006	
Doctor and Daughter (ドクター&ドーター)	Yōkihi	November 2008	July 2011	
Factory Z	Shigeo Makino, Takashi Hirotsugu	October 2002	August 2004	
Fade Out	Ikeda Takashi	December 2000	April 2004	
Girls Saurus DX (ガールズザウルスDX)	Kei Kusunoki	January 2003	November 2008	
Grimal (ぐりまる)	Hiroyuki Kaidō, Tomizawa Yoshihiko	April 2008	October 2009	
Hikari no Machi (ひかりのまち)	Inio Asano	May 2004	February 2005	
Hoero Pen (吼えろペン)	Kazuhiko Shimamoto	August 2000	October 2004	
Hoshikuzu Bangaichi (星屑番外地)	Tatsuhiko Ida	July 2009	September 2010	
Iron Man (鉄人)	Toshihiko Tahagi, Naoyuki Ochiai	October 2001	September 2003	
Jormungand (ヨルムンガンド)	Keitaro Takahashi	May 2006	February 2012	
Kamisama Dolls (神様ドォルズ)	Hajime Yamamura	January 2007	March 2013	
King of Cats (ネコの王)	Toshihiro Ono	August 2000	August 2003	
Ki Yasume Kotoba-kan (気やすめ言葉館)	Minako Fujino	April 2001	December 2002	
Kobato (こばと。)	Clamp	January 2005	September 2005	
Koi Neko (コイネコ)	Mashima Etsuya	October 2004	January 2013	
Konohana Watashi Desu (この花はわたしです。)	Masahiko Kokuki, Yuka Jukuni	August 2000	February 2004	
Kyōkai Sensen (境界戦線)	Hajime Yamamura	July 2003	November 2003	
Let It Be!!	Mari Koizumi	August 2000	November 2002	
March Story	Hyung Min Kim, Yang Kyung-il	January 2008	February 2013	
Masked Bowler (仮面ボウラー)	Takeshi Wakasa	September 2009	September 2011	
Mel Kano (メルカノ。)	Towa Oshima	July 2005	June 2010	
Prizona 6 (ぷりぞな6)	Ryunosuke Kingetsu, Kojino	August 2008	September 2010	
Psycho Trader Chinami (サイコトレーダーちなみ)	Akihiro Kimura	August 2000	July 2001	
Profiler Menko (プロファイラーめんこ, Purofaira Menko)	Mao Onoda	August 2008	May 2009	
Rabuma Unten (ラブマウンテン)	Tomuo Fujina	May 2008	June 2009	
RahXephon (ラーゼフォン)	Yutaka Izubuchi, Takeaki Momose	September 2001	December 2002	
Raiden-18	Hiromu Arakawa	August 2005	February 2021	(Note: It consists of four chapters irregularly published in 2005, 2010, and 2021.)
Rec	Hanamizawa Q-taro	December 2002	April 2013	
Rubbers 7 (ラバーズ7)	Sukune Inugami	November 2002	May 2007	
Seigi Keikan Monju (正義警官モンジュ)	Hiroki Miyashita	December 2004	August 2011	
Sei Moesu no Hakobune (聖モエスの方舟)	Nariko Enomoto	October 2009	January 2013	
Sekai Uniform (世界制服)	Nariko Enomoto	February 2008	February 2009	
Shibuya Gadiangaruzu (渋谷ガーディアンガールズ)	Mari Koizumi	March 2004	May 2006	
Shin Hoero Pen (新吼えろペン)	Kazuhiko Shimamoto	November 2004	August 2008	
Shishi Boshi ki Girusutein (獣星記ギルステイン)	Naoyuki Sakai, Hisao Tamaki	August 2000	October 2002	
Sleeping Planet (眠れる惑星)	Yōkihi	December 2004	November 2007	
Spiritual Paradise (スピリチュアルぱらだいす)	Kouji Onodera	May 2007	July 2009	
Tenshi Dake ga Tsubasa (天使だけが翼を持っている)	Reiji Hagiwara	August 2000	October 2001	
Tetsukko na 3 Shimai (鉄娘な3姉妹)	Seiji Matsuyama	January 2009	December 2010	
The Sleeper (ザ・スリーパー)	Fujihiko Hosono	August 2000	August 2002	
Welcome to River City (薬多江町へようこそ)	Yōkihi	November 2002	March 2004	
Trafficker (トラフィッカー)	Yasunori Mitsunaga	January 2001	July 2002	
Tsuri Chichi Nagisa (釣りチチ・渚)	Masaki Satō	April 2009	March 2012	
Wake Up!	Tokihiko Matsuura	November 2000	January 2003	
What a Wonderful World! (素晴らしい世界, Subarashii Sekai)	Inio Asano	June 2002	April 2004	
Wilderness (ワイルダネス, Wairudanesu)	Akihiro Ito	September 2000	August 2025	
Yamagata Scream (山形スクリーム)	Imatani Tecchu	December 2008	June 2009	
Yarujene (やるじぇね)	Tomuo Fujina	September 2009	July 2010	

=== 2010s ===
Title	Author	Premiered	Finished	Ref.
Alice on Border Road (今際の路のアリス)	Haro Aso, Takayoshi Kuroda	September 2015	March 2018	
Assassin's Creed: Blade of Shao Jun (アサシン クリード チャイナ)	Minoji Kurata	November 2019	July 2021	
Butter Nut! (バターナッツ!)	Sukune Inugami	March 2014	April 2015	
Destro 246 (デストロ246)	Keitarō Takahashi	May 2012	May 2016	
Gunbured × Sisters (ガンバレッド×シスターズ)	Wataru Mitogawa	October 2019	September 2021	
Hamada Britney no Manga de Wakaru Moe Business (浜田ブリトニーの漫画でわかる萌えビジネス)	Britney Hamada	October 2010	June 2013	
Imōto Sae Ireba Ii @comic (妹さえいればいい。@comic)	Yomi Hirasaka, Idu	January 2016	August 2019	
Infinite Stratos (IS〈インフィニット・ストラトス〉)	Izuru Yumizuru, Homura Yuuki	June 2013	March 2020	
Jigoku Ane (じごくあね)	Yū Yoshidamaru	April 2014	February 2016	
Jinsei (人生)	Ougyo Kawagishi, Seiji Matsuyama	March 2014	April 2015	
Manten no Hoshi to Aoi Sora (満天の星と青い空)	Hiroyuki Nishimori, Yuuki Iinuma	September 2018	October 2019	
My Youth Romantic Comedy Is Wrong, as I Expected @ comic (やはり俺の青春ラブコメはまちがっている。@comic)	Wataru Watari, Naomichi Io	January 2013	February 2023	
Re:Creators	Rei Hiroe, Daiki Kase	May 2017	December 2019	
Ren'ai Distortion (恋愛ディストーション)	Sukune Inugami	April 2012	August 2013	
Shosei Katsuragi Shinjirō no Nichijō (書生葛木信二郎の日常)	Minoji Kurata	December 2010	November 2014	
Tetsuko no Tabi 3-daime (鉄子の旅 3代目)	Hirohiko Yokomi, Akira Kirioka	June 2016	February 2019	
Vampeerz (ヴァンピアーズ)	Akili	March 2019	May 2023	
Westwood Vibrato	Youn In-wan, Kim Sun Hee	May 2010	April 2012	
Yoi Machi Overload (宵街オーバーロード)	Tatsuhiko Ida	January 2015	May 2016	

=== 2020s ===
Title	Author	Premiered	Finished	Ref.
Minami Nanami Wants to Shine (七海みなみは輝きたい)	Yūki Yaku, Bana Yoshida	July 2020	February 2023	
The Tunnel to Summer, the Exit of Goodbyes: Ultramarine (夏へのトンネル、さよならの出口 群青)	Mei Hachimoku, Koudon	August 2020	December 2021	
