= Yang Kyung-il =

South Korean manhwa artist (born 1970)

- Born: March 26, 1970 (age 56) Incheon, South Korea
- Area: Artist
- Notable works: Blade of the Phantom Master

Korean name
- Hangul: 양경일
- Hanja: 梁慶一
- RR: Yang Gyeongil
- MR: Yang Kyŏngil

Yang Kyung-il (Korean: 양경일; born March 26, 1970) is a South Korean manhwa artist from Incheon, South Korea. In 2009, he and frequent collaborator Youn In-wan began serializing their manga Defense Devil in Shonen Sunday.

== Works ==
- Area D: Inō Ryōiki
- Blade of Heaven
- Blade of the Phantom Master
- Burning Hell
- Defense Devil
- Deja-vu
- Island (with Youn In-wan)
- The Kingdom of the Gods (with Kim Eun-hee)
- March Story
- Zombie Hunter

=== Adaptations of Yang Kyung-il's works ===
- Kingdom (Netflix original series based on The Kingdom of the Gods)
  - Kingdom (2019)
  - Kingdom 2 (2020)
  - Kingdom: Ashin of the North (2021)
- Island (OCN original based on Island, 2021)
