= List of Chrono Crusade chapters =

First volume of Chrono Crusade, released Fujimi Shobo in December 1999

Written and illustrated by Daisuke Moriyama, the manga series Chrono Crusade spans 56 chapters, called "Acts". The first chapter premiered in the November 1998 issue Dragon Age, where the series ran until its conclusion in the June 2004 issue. The individual chapters were published in eight tankōbon volumes by Fujimi Shobo from December 1999 to September 2004.

The series was licensed for English language release in North America by ADV Manga, which released the eight volumes from May 2004 through May 2006. The series was released in English in Australia and New Zealand by Madman Entertainment. It was also licensed for regional language releases in France by Asuka, in Mexico by Grupo Editorial Vid, in Italy by Planet Manga, Germany by Carlsen Comics, and in Denmark and Sweden by Mangismo. Gonzo produced a twenty-four episode anime series based on the manga that aired in Japan on Fuji TV from November 24, 2003, until June 10, 2004, and was licensed for release in North America by ADV Films.

All eight volumes of the manga feature Rosette Christopher and Chrono on the covers.

== Volume listing ==
No.	Original release date	Original ISBN	English release date	English ISBN
1	November 30, 1999	978-4-04-926143-1	June 8, 2004	978-1413900842
Act 1: "Her name is Sister Rosette"; Act 2: "Chrono's Contract"; Act 3: "Carol of the Dark City"; Act 4: "As You Wish"; Act 5: "Angel on the Altar"; Act 6: "The Cry to Awaken"; Afterword: "My Dream Life in the Doghouse"; Translator's Notes
2	May 30, 2000	978-4-04-926152-3	October 4, 2004	978-1413901047
Act 7: "Ghost in the Watch"; Act 8: "Falling Rain"; Act 9: "The Beginning"; Act 10: "Two Decisions"; Act 11: "To Move Forward Again"; Act 12: "Girl's Step"; Act 13: "Raging Tornado"; Act 14: "I Am Here"
3	November 29, 2000	978-4-04-926161-5	December 14, 2004	978-1413900453
Act 15: "The Witch of New York"; Act 16: "Revenger"; Act 17: "Trust"; Act 18: "The Decision at the Party"; Act 19: "Marionette Train 1"; Act 20: "Marionette Train 2"; Act 21: "Marionette Train 3"; Extra: "Doll in the Skyscraper"
4	September 25, 2001	978-4-04-926182-0	April 5, 2005	978-1413902396
Act 22: "Sinner"; Act 23: "A Sound That Reaches Into the Darkness"; Act 24: "Exorcize Your Doubts"; Act 25: "Pure Song"; Act 26: "Before Dawn"; Act 27: "Night of the Carnival"; Act 28: "Under the Starry Sky"; Afterword: "My Dream Life in the Dog House"; Translator's Notes
5	August 29, 2002	978-4-04-926203-2	June 6, 2005	1-4139-0273-1
978-1413902730: Act 29: "Reunions and Doubts"; Act 30: "A Never-ending Nightmare and an Awakening Demon"; Act 31: "Raging Fury"; Act 32: "Meetings and Departures"; Act 33: "Sinners' Paradise"; Act 34: "I Can't Run Anymore"; Act 35: "Separate Ways"; Afterword: "My Dream Life in the Dog House"; Translator's Notes
6	May 28, 2003	978-4-04-926225-4	August 1, 2005	978-1413903096
Act 36: "Mary Magdalene"; Act 37: "The Passing of Days"; Act 38: "A Dream That Enfolds the Stars"; Act 39: "Signs and Bonds"; Act 40: "Our Song"; Act 41: "54 Years Ago"; Act 42: "To A Distant Place"
7	December 25, 2003	978-4-04-926237-7	April 12, 2006	978-1413903393
Act 43: "Final Curtain Call"; Act 44: "Artillery March"; Act 45: "Pandaemonium's Pulse"; Act 46: "The Crusade"; Act 47: "Flower of Stone"; Act 48: "Gift"; Extra: "Elizabeth, 1921"
8	September 1, 2004	978-4-04-926247-6	July 5, 2006	978-1413903430
Act 49: "The One Clear Way"; Act 50: "Resolution's Trigger"; Act 51: "That You May Know Happiness"; Act 52: "Transcending the Bonds"; Act 53: "Countdown"; Act 54: "Something Precious"; Act 55: "Beyond the End: A Pale Vision of You"; Act 56: "A Future With You"; "Epilogue"

== See also ==
- List of Chrono Crusade episodes
