= List of World Embryo chapters =

The cover of the first tankōbon released in Japan by Shōnen Gahosha on March 27, 2006, featuring Riku Amami and Neene.

The chapters of World Embryo are written and illustrated by Daisuke Moriyama and have been serialized in Young King OURs from 2005 to 2014. The series follows Riku Amami who finds himself caught in the conflict between kanshu, monsters that use cell phone signals to reproduce and travel, and F.L.A.G., an organization of warriors who wield Jinki weapons designed to fight kanshu.

Since its premiere, over 100 chapters had been released in Japan. Shōnen Gahosha is publishing the individual chapters in tankōbon volumes, with thirteen released in Japan. The series is licensed for an English language release in Singapore by Chuang Yi, in Australia by Madman Entertainment, and in North America by Dark Horse Comics. In Europe, the series is licensed in Italy by J-POP Edizioni, and in France by Kazé Manga (formerly Asuka).

== List of chapters and volumes ==
No.	Original release date	Original ISBN	English - Singapore release date	English - Singapore ISBN
1	March 27, 2006	978-4-7859-2629-8	July 24, 2007	978-981-269-966-4
001: "Birth in the Moonlight"; 002: "Cocoon"; 003: "World in her Eyes"; 004: "A Helping Hand"; 005: "Kanshu "; 006: "Death and..."; 007: "Dignity Scatters"; 008: "Cloaked in the Night, Slipping Away"; Other English releases: Australia: September 12, 2007; North America: —
2	November 27, 2006	978-4-7859-2717-2	September 4, 2007	978-981-269-968-8
009: "Monster"; 010: "Wolfboy"; 011: "Creeping Messenger of Death:"; 012: "Borderline"; 013: "That's the Policy"; 014: "From Hand to Hand"; 015: "Heroes Don't Smile Anymore"; 016: "Then I Can Reach My Destination"; Other English releases: Australia: January 23, 2008; North America: —
3	August 9, 2007	978-4-7859-2830-8	June 17, 2008	978-981-276-481-2
017: "Terms of the Agreement"; 018: "Seed of Doubt"; 019: "Training Progress Report"; 020: "Mask"; 021: "First Battle"; 022: "That Power, For Someone"; 023: "Overcome at that Point"; 024: "She Waits at Twilight"; Other English releases: Australia: September 10, 2008; North America: —
4	April 28, 2008	978-4-7859-2951-0	February 24, 2009	978-981-276-760-8
025: "Amane"; 026: "And Then..."; 027: "Under the Surface"; 028: "Executioners"; 029: "A Portrait of What Used To Be"; 030: "Investigation Commenced"; 031: "Visitor"; 032: "Distant Starry Sky"; Other English releases: Australia: October 6, 2009; North America: —
5	January 29, 2009	978-4-7859-3099-8	September 23, 2009	978-981-276-953-4
033: "Grandpa Returns"; 034: "Bonds"; 035: "Break Through!"; 036: "Unreachable Clouds"; 037: "Beyond the Ocean (Part 1)"; 038: "Beyond the Ocean (Part 2)"; 039: "I Know"; 040: "Summer of Accomplices"; Other English releases: Australia: October 12, 2009; North America: —
6	December 28, 2009	978-4-7859-3287-9	—	—
041: "Childhood's End"; 042: "The Kazama Hospital"; 043: "The Seven Days of Agatsuma Yui"; 044: "The Seven Days of Agatsuma Yui 2"; 045: "Longing"; 046: "Tonight, Right Here"; 047: "The Result of a Lie"; Other English releases: Australia: October 7, 2010; North America: —
7	September 3, 2010	978-4-7859-3460-6	—	—
048: "The Night Before"; 049: "Sleeping Beauty"; 050: "Rubble Tower"; 051: "The Depths of Darkness"; 052: "Ende"; 053: "Sisters"; 054: "Leaving the Nest"; 055: "WORLDEND・NEVEREND"; Other English releases: Australia: October 3, 2011; North America: —
8	June 10, 2011	978-4-7859-3634-1	—	—
056: "Cage Sky"; 057: "Hatsumi Island"; 058: "Hatsumi Island 2"; 059: "Hatsumi Island 3"; 060: "Hatsumi Island 4"; 061: "Hatsumi Island 5"; 062: "Hatsumi Island 6"; 063: "The End of a Dream, The Beginning of Lamentation"; Other English releases: Australia: October 11, 2011; North America: —
9	March 7, 2012	978-4-7859-3799-7	—	—
064: "The Close of the Fairytale"; 065: "The Truth"; 066: "Jinki Users That Don't Fight"; 067: "The World is Connected..."; 068: "The Chains of Truth"; 069: "Withering Memories"; 070: "Bonds Stirring"; 071: "Suraga"; Other English releases: Australia: —; North America: —
10	May 30, 2013	978-4-7859-5058-3	—	—
072: "Declaration by Infection"; 073: "Give Me Your Hand..."; 074: "The Destroyer's Roar"; 075: "The Vow"; 076: "In a Dream"; 077: "This Isn't Me"; 078: "Letter"; Other English releases: Australia: —; North America: —
11	May 30, 2013	—	—	—
079: "That Person's Memories..."; 080: "Mother"; 081: "The Eve Of Battle"; 082: "Fun And Games"; 083: "On the Player's Shoulders"; 084: "Summer Homework"; 085: "Final Countdown"; Other English releases: Australia: —; North America: —
12	September 30, 2014	978-4-7859-5391-1	—	—
086: "Last Regret"; 087: "A Future Entrusted"; 088: "Find Me"; 089: "Reborn"; 090: "Linkage"; 091: "Wish"; Other English releases: Australia: —; North America: —
13	September 30, 2014	978-4-7859-5392-8	—	—
092: "That Kyuuki's name is..."; 093: "Penetrator"; 094: "Wishes and curses"; 095: "Finding atonement"; 096: "?"; 097: "Epilogue"; Other English releases: Australia: —; North America: —
