= List of Chrono Crusade episodes =

Sixth U.S. DVD volume of Chrono Crusade

The anime series Chrono Crusade premiered in Japan on Fuji TV on November 23, 2003, and ran for twenty-four episodes until its series finale on June 10, 2004. Produced by Gonzo Digimation, the series is adapted from the first three volumes of the eight-volume manga series of the same name by Daisuke Moriyama across the first thirteen episodes. The remainder of the series is primarily an original story line that occasionally still pulls from the source manga, which was incomplete at the time the anime series finished.

The anime was licensed for release in North America by ADV Films. The company's English dub of the series was broadcast in the United States on Showtime Beyond from February 17, 2006, through July 28, 2006. ADV released the episodes across seven individual DVD volumes before releasing the entire series in a single box set collection. This collection was voted best anime of 2004. Funimation Entertainment later licensed Chrono Crusade after ADV Film's license expired, and is re-releasing it to DVD in February 2011. Chrono Crusade was broadcast on Syfy beginning on February 22, 2011.

The series uses two pieces of theme music. "Tsubasa wa Pleasure Line" (翼はPleasure Line, Tsubasa wa Pureshā Rain; Wings Are Pleasure Line), by Minami Kuribayashi, is used for the series' opening theme while Saeko Chiba's "Sayonara Solitaire" (さよならソリティア, Sayonara Soritia; Farewell Solitaire) is used for the ending theme.

== Episode listing ==
| No. | Title | Directed by | Written by | Original release date | American air date |
|---|---|---|---|---|---|
| 1 | "Sister Rosette"; Transliteration: "Shisutā Rozetto" (Japanese: シスターロゼット) | Yū Kō | Atsuhiro Tomioka | November 25, 2003 | February 17, 2006 |
Rosette Christopher, an elite exorcist of the Magdalene Order, is partnered by contract with Chrono. When the two hunt down a menacing demon in an abandoned restaurant, the building is consequently destroyed. Sister Kate Valentine becomes disappointed in Rosette, while raising concern for Chrono in a conversation with Father Ewan Remington, who reassures her that, despite being a demon, Chrono has a heart and some faith should be placed on him. Elder Edward Hamilton patents a bullet called the "Gospel" as an experiment. Rosette and Chrono are sent to destroy a gigantic devil on a cruise ship. Chrono gives Rosette the Gospel, successfully annihilating the devil, but damaging the ship in the process.
| 2 | "Contractor"; Transliteration: "Keiyakusha" (Japanese: 契約者) | Hiroyuki Kanbe | Atsuhiro Tomioka | December 2, 2003 | February 24, 2006 |
Elder Hamilton invents the bullet called the "Spirit" as his latest weapon, requesting Rosette and Chrono to deliver it to Sister Kate, but they are interrupted with another demon hunt mission. After having shot off the horn of the demon, Rosette promptly loses her gun containing the Spirit from her hand, as to when the demon approached and startled her. A suspicious man, the one responsible for obtaining the weapon, breaks into the convent, revealing himself as the same demon from before. The demon transforms recklessly by absorbing the aura of the Spirit. However, Chrono begins to transform after seeing Rosette tossed aside into the ground. Rosette later manages to calm Chrono down and is able to blast the demon. Elsewhere, Joshua Christopher slaughters a viscount under Aion, as Fiore Harvenheit, Joshua's caretaker, witnesses the result of his massacre.
| 3 | "The Apostles"; Transliteration: "Otsukai" (Japanese: 御使い) | Toshiyuki Katō | Atsuhiro Tomioka | December 9, 2003 | March 3, 2006 |
Rosette and Chrono are sent to retrieve Azmaria Hendric, an apostle of charity, from Ricardo Hendric, the casino resort hotel manager and her foster father. Rosette reluctantly bumps into Azmaria in an equipment room, but she is caught by Lerajie, Ricardo's servant. As the two catch up with Chrono, the three escape outside but are attacked by the demon army under Lerajie's command. Several hotel guests suffered from injuries after Rosette and Chrono defeated the army. However, Azamaria responsively vocalizes, having the angelic powers to heal the wounded. Back at the convent, Sister Kate and Father Remington inform Rosette that Joshua, being her younger brother, is an apostle of hope, though harnessing demonic powers. Rosette later takes Chrono and Azmaria to a nearby lake, in hope of cheering up the latter. After sunset, Lerajie, revealed to be a viscount under Aion, ambushes the area and captures Azmaria.
| 4 | "The Sinners"; Transliteration: "Tsumibito" (Japanese: 罪人) | Noriaki Akitaya | Atsuhiro Tomioka | December 16, 2003 | March 10, 2006 |
Father Remington arrives at the lake to aid Rosette and Chrono back to health. Meanwhile, Azmaria is taken to Ricardo's blimp, where she discovers that Ricardo's cadaverous body was restored through Lerajie's powers temporarily. The two force her to emit turquoise "astral lines", draining her life into Ricardo. Rosette convinces Chrono to transform and summon his demonic powers through the release of the seal of the soul timepiece. Lerajie undoubtedly steals the astral energy from Ricardo, thus ending his life. Rosette and Chrono find the blimp by following the trail of astral lines. Chrono engages in a fierce battle against Lerajie, while Rosette goes in and rescues Azmaria. Rosette and Chrono later team up and defeats Lerajie, which causes the blimp to explode. Rosette, Chrono, and Azmaria skydive to the ground unharmed. Though Azmaria realizes the absence of her powers, Rosette invites her to stay at the convent.
| 5 | "Militia"; Transliteration: "Shūdō Kishi" (Japanese: 修道騎士) | Tatsuya Abe | Atsuhiro Tomioka | December 23, 2003 | March 17, 2006 |
Rosette and Chrono converse with Sister Kate and Father Remington concerning the connection between the apostles and the sinners, however Rosette seeks to search for her long lost brother. While Father Remington convinces Rosette to take a militia test, Sister Kate shows Azmaria the training grounds under which Rosette gained her exorcising abilities. However, it is found out that Rosette and Azmaria are soon trapped in the training grounds with a demon capable of mind possession, in which the latter soon becomes a victim. Rosette manages to save Azmaria using a soul exorcism to confront the demon.
| 6 | "Jewelsummoner"; Transliteration: "Hōseki no Majo" (Japanese: 宝石の魔女) | Shinichi Shimizu | Kiyoko Yoshimura | January 6, 2004 | March 24, 2006 |
Rosette, Chrono, and Azmaria go on their mission as militia at night to recover a devilish corpse smuggled by a mafia. As the corpse calls forth his minions, the three are soon interrupted by Satella Harvenheit, who is a jewelsummoner. The four take down the minions, while corpse escapes. Satella realizes that Chrono is a devil, questioning his purpose in the Magdalene Order. On the next morning, Satella encounters the three again at a crime scene caused by the mafia, much to her dismay. They follow her to a park, where they all stop to eat some hot dogs. Chrono empathizes for the fact Rosette and Satella both are searching for someone in their lives for years on end. The same devilish corpse reappears, and the four work together and are able to destroy the corpse once and for all. Nonetheless, Satella, who bears a grudge against demons due to her past, departs in shame.
| 7 | "The Devil"; Transliteration: "Akuma" (Japanese: 悪魔) | Katsuichi Nakayama | Atsuhiro Tomioka | January 13, 2004 | March 31, 2006 |
Father Remington reports that the moon has turned red and the sun has shaded black, which are omens symbolizing Aion is soon approaching. Sister Kate notes that red hail from the sky was sent by Aion in order for Pandemonium to breach the Seal of the Seven Wings. Rosette, Chrono, and Azmaria are called into action as they scramble to restore the seal and fend off any miasma bypassing the breach. Satella accompanies the three, later being able to restore the seal. The tables are turned when Aion, who is a former acquaintance of Chrono, makes an appearance, overwhelming the four. While he attacks Chrono, Aion explains that Joshua is still alive. He also proposes to Azmaria to join him, since she is an apostle of charity. Just as an enraged Chrono attempts to transform, Azmaria releases her powers to vanish Aion, unexpectedly after accepting his offer. Nevertheless, what was really vanish was merely a shadow of Aion.
| 8 | "Puppet"; Transliteration: "Kairai" (Japanese: 傀儡) | Kiyoko Sayama | Natsuko Takahashi | January 20, 2004 | April 7, 2006 |
Father Remington is held captive at the Grand Central Station by Rizelle, a sinner under Aion. Rosette, who receives a call from him, is unaware of the situation. After unloading some packages, she leaves Chrono and Azmaria at the convent, making her way to the train station. Rizelle is revealed to be a spider demon, being able to control her victims as puppets with her spiderwebs. Rosette confronts Rizelle after hearing what latter said about Joshua, which convinces a desperate Rosette to board a train to see Joshua. Father Remington pleads for her to reconsider, but Rizelle subdues him. Rosette frees Father Remington from the spiderwebs, as the two make their escape from the victims. Chrono and Azmaria arrive to tranquilize the victims, causing a hesitant Rizelle to fall back, who reminds Rosette that Joshua is waiting to see her.
| 9 | "Joshua"; Transliteration: "Yoshua" (Japanese: ヨシュア) | Toshiyuki Katō | Atsuhiro Tomioka | January 27, 2004 | April 14, 2006 |
Rosette, Chrono, and Azmaria take a trip to the Seventh Bell Orphanage, where Rosette and Joshua had previously resided. The orphanage was destroyed yet frozen in time. Four years ago, a short-tempered Rosette had cared for a sickly Joshua. She tries to convince him not to join the Magdalene Order. The two later slip into a riverbed, where they end up falling into a pit. Joshua uses his powers to heal Rosette of her bloodily wounded knee, but Joshua wonders why his powers cannot heal himself. They find the tomb of Mary Magdalene underground, encountering Chrono for the first time, who introduces himself as a devil. The three go out on a picnic, and Chrono talks about how the astral lines are the souls that encompass the universe, which catches the attention of Joshua. The three later spend the rest of the day together. Come nightfall, Joshua goes to see Father Remington, in hopes of finding a cure for his illness. Meanwhile, Rosette and Chrono are distraught when Aion shows up in the form of an eagle.
| 10 | "Horn"; Transliteration: "Senkaku" (Japanese: 尖角) | Hiroshi Ishiodori | Atsuhiro Tomioka | February 3, 2004 | April 21, 2006 |
Aion unveils to Rosette that he removed Chrono's horns and has given them to Joshua, acquire him enhanced supernatural abilities. The side effect, however, is that the horns give him the power to hear the thoughts of others. Joshua attacks a frightened orphan in anguish, turning him into stone. Rosette is taken to the orphanage by Chrono, only to see many other orphans turned into stone. She sees Joshua, who warns her to get away from him because of the painful noises of thoughts in his head. A whirlwind erects and destroys the orphanage, but time freezes and the orphanage stood still. Chrono takes Rosette away from the whirlwind, but he mentions that his astral energy is depleting due to the loss of his horns. The only other option is for the devil to make a contract with a human, in which the former's power is augmented while the latter's life is diminished. Rosette is willing to sacrifice her life to help save Joshua. Chrono accepts her request, and thus the two are bound by a pact. In present time, Rosette, Chrono, and Azmaria head back to the convent after reminiscing in the past. Elsewhere, Aion visits Joshua and informs him that a third apostle is found.
| 11 | "Gabriel Hound"; Transliteration: "Kedamono" (Japanese: けだもの) | Hiroyuki Kanbe | Yūji Hosono | February 9, 2004 | April 28, 2006 |
A hellhound is running amok devouring several mafia clans. Rosette and Chrono chase after the hellhound, while it attacks yet another mafia clan. Satella shows up to fend it off, much to Rosette's chagrin. Sister Kate and Father Remington informs the militia that the hellhound was summoned by a woman who used black magic in order to seek vengeance against the mafia who killed her fiancé. It is also noted that the hellhound becomes more corporeal after each mafia clan is devoured. It is seen that Satella is hired by a mafia clan as a bodyguard. Elder Hamilton, who introduces his new motorcycle creation deemed the "Gabriel Hound", tells Rosette and Chrono that the same mafia clan is being attack by the hellhound in a subway tunnel. When they arrive, they save Satella from the hellhound. It is shown that while Rosette is selfless in manner, Satella seems selfish in attitude when they talk about sacrificing the life of one for another. The two girls ride on the Gabriel Hound and catch up to the hellhound. Rosette uses a Gospel to obliterate the hellhound.
| 12 | "Holy Night"; Transliteration: "Seiya" (Japanese: 聖夜) | Noriaki Akitaya | Kiyoko Yoshimura | February 16, 2004 | May 5, 2006 |
Sister Kate and Father Remington show Rosette, Chrono, and Azmaria photographs tracking leads to Aion involved abduction and murder. However, this investigation will have to wait until after Christmas. The three go to the streets to perform charity work for the convent. After they run into Satella, revealed to be a wealthy art company owner, it is realized that Azmaria has never had an actual Christmas due to her neglected childhood. Azmaria goes to a corner shop where the shopkeeper shows her a snow globe, catching her attention. However, she gives it away to a young man, who wanted to give the snow globe to his girlfriend as a present. Rosette and Chrono find her, and the three go to an orphanage to give alms donated by the convent. Azmaria sees that Rosette and Chrono are satisfied with their new angel badges as her gifts to them. Azmaria later experiences her first real Christmas at the convent, and Rosette and Chrono exchange gifts outside in the snow.
| 13 | "Older Sister"; Transliteration: "Ane" (Japanese: 姉) | Hiroshi Kimura | Natsuko Takahashi | February 23, 2004 | May 12, 2006 |
Fiore finds Joshua in the bathtub suffering from a chronic headache. Meanwhile, Rosette, Chrono, and Azmaria head by train from New York City to San Francisco. They encounter a mother and child, both of which Chrono senses as suspicious. Satella, who is also aboard the train, invites the three into her private railroad car. However, Rosette is lured by Rizelle into the dining car, soon finding out that Joshua is crying out for her. Rizelle splits the two passenger car, separating Rosette from the rest. Chrono manages to break through the dining car, but Rizelle has stolen Rosette's soul timepiece and has held Azmaria and Satella captive. Rosette is forced to shoot Chrono in the heart in order to gain back the soul timepiece, while Azmaria releases the victims from Rizelle's control. This does not stop Rizelle, nonetheless, as she pulls Rosette on top of the railroad car. Rosette is overwhelmed by Rizelle's attacks, but Rosette shuns Rizelle for her relationship with Aion. Even firing a Gospel does not stop Rizelle, but it is when Rosette stabs her with her own horn that she falls off the train into the abyss as she disintegrates.
| 14 | "Prayer"; Transliteration: "Inori" (Japanese: 祈り) | Yūki Ukai | Natsuko Takahashi | March 1, 2004 | May 19, 2006 |
Satella finds Rosette, Chrono, and Azmaria in a desert, offering them a ride in her limousine to her villa. Chrono comes down with a fever on the way there. While Chrono rests in the villa, Rosette and Satella drive all over town to find a pharmacy that supplies medicine strong enough to reduce Chrono's fever. The two go to a fortune teller in hopes to find an alternative way to help Chrono. After picking up over-the-counter medicine, Rosette also comes down with a fever. Azmaria prepares dinner for Rosette and Chrono, who both are pleased with her cooking. Azmaria explains to Satella that Rosette and Chrono worry for each other. Steiner, Satella's butler, notices a change in her attitude, one of affection toward the others. Later at night, Rosette kisses Chrono as a cure for his illness while he has fallen asleep, as the result is shown to be effective.
| 15 | "The Pursuers"; Transliteration: "Otte" (Japanese: 追手) | Tatsuya Abe | Atsuhiro Tomioka | March 8, 2004 | May 26, 2006 |
Duke Duffau, the duke of Pandemonium, enters the villa to seek allegiance with Rosette, Chrono, Azmaria, Satella to help fight against Aion. Sister Kate and Father Remington argue for the approval of the Council of the Catholic Church for the alliance, mentioning how Chrono helped save the Magdalene Order many times. Rosette has to decide whether to accept or decline associating with the pursuers. Chrono tells Satella that Aion wanted to establish a world in which desire is considered sinless. The pursuers declared war against the sinners thereafter. Elder Hamilton shows Rosette an updated version of the Gospel with innovative features. While Rosette, Chrono, and Azmaria meet up with Duffau, Reverend Jack Gilliam, who is from the west coast branch of the Magdalene Order, comes to aid the three in the upcoming battle. Elsewhere, Aion and Fiore enter a laboratory where Shader explains that the forgiveness for the fallen angels will occur once the head of Pantemonium, six of the apostles, and the seven virtues are reassembled. Fiore protects Joshua from an enraged Genai, who is distraught that Joshua was at fault for Rizelle's death. Duffau calls Rosette the reincarnation of Mary of Magdalene, having the power of an apostle, noting that she will have marks engraved in her body. Back at the villa, the marks start to appear on her body when she takes a bath.
| 16 | "Believer"; Transliteration: "Shinkōsha" (Japanese: 信仰者) | Kiyoko Sayama | Kiyoko Yoshimura | March 15, 2004 | June 2, 2006 |
Azmaria is give the opportunity to sing under the support of the Harvenheit dowry. Satella, awakened by a disturbing dream, is sent away on a mission to solve the case of disappearances that have been occurring in the outskirts of San Francisco. Rosette, Chrono, and Azmaria discuss with Duffau and Reverend Gilliam about the disappearances. Satella enters a gold mine, only to fall through the ground into a dungeon, and is soon captured by Eliza Brown. Reverend Gilliam tells the others that Eliza is a devil worshiper. Eliza performs a ritual of the crucified serpent in order to summon Aion. It is then that Aion prevents a jealous Eliza from choking Satella to death, done by an alluring kiss and a glass of wine. Satella, displaying her hatred towards the devils, is shocked to see Aion holding her jewelsummoning bracelet. Once he pour wine onto the bracelet, Aion reveals that he is responsible for the death of her family. Nevertheless, he also mentions that her older sister is still alive. Aion then gives Satella a kiss, but also crushes the bones of Eliza, who attempted to stab him with a broken fragment of the wineglass. Just about when Aion begins to seduce Satella, Rosette and Chrono arrive inside the dungeon. After the two learned about Satella's deceased family, they begin attacking Aion. However, this is no avail, as Aion effortlessly dodges all of their attacks. Aion departs, later wondering how far Chrono is willing to press on.
| 17 | "Accomplices"; Transliteration: "Kyōhansha-tachi" (Japanese: 共犯者たち) | Yū Kō | Kiyoko Yoshimura | March 22, 2004 | June 9, 2006 |
Steiner recalls that a teacup was the only possession that survived after Aion previously destroyed the Harvenheit family mansion. Satella is unable to regain her power as a jewelsummoner. Furthermore, Rosette begins to bleed from her forehead and wrists caused by the developing marks on her body. Chrono explains that the marks are stigmata that symbolize the crucifixion of Jesus Christ. The militia and the pursuers are planning to attack the sinners at noon on the outskirts of San Francisco. Rosette and Chrono leave Azmaria and Satella to assist the militia and the pursuers. Duffau, Carv, and Gurio combine their strengths to fight against Viede and Genai. However, the pursuers become gradually overwhelmed by the sinners. Even though Duffau gives Chrono a sword to wield, Chrono fails to land a hit on either of the sinner. When the militia establishes a barrier in the surrounding area, Rosette fires a Gospel at Viede, however he is still able to attack. Carv soon restrains Viede, which allows the Gospel to absorb both of them. Genai retreats to Aion, mourning the death of Viede. Aion later goes to see Joshua, telling him that he will see his sister once more.
| 18 | "Four People"; Transliteration: "Yo Nin" (Japanese: 四人) | Toshiyuki Katō | Kiyoko Yoshimura | March 29, 2004 | June 17, 2006 |
Reverend Gilliam reports to Sister Kate the aftermath of the war against the sinner, in that the militia had suffered many casualties. Duffau reminds Chrono how he revolted against the devils long ago. Azmaria, concerned for her friends, invites them to a local carnival, all to ease their minds. Meanwhile, Aion makes his preparations for attending the carnival as well. At a square dance hall, Rosette forces Chrono to dance with her after seeing Satella gracefully dance with a gentleman. Later on, Satella regains the powers of her jewelsummoning bracelet as it begins to glow, after she and Azmaria talk about meeting someone who they would trust. Rosette and Chrono, lost in a large crowd, encounter a romantic moment when they reach the peak and view the night sky. Chrono reveals that he will cease to exist when Rosette would ultimately die, but he then says that he will do anything in his powers to prevent that from happening. During a fireworks displays, Rosette catches a glimpse of Aion's eagle form. She follows it, only to run into Joshua.
| 19 | "Neck"; Transliteration: "Kubi" (Japanese: 首) | Tatsuya Abe | Atsuhiro Tomioka | April 14, 2004 | June 23, 2006 |
Joshua fails to recognize Rosette as his older sister, as the latter deduces that he was brainwashed by Aion. Steiner, telling Azmaria how Satella has changed in attitude, is suddenly slaughtered by Genai, who captures Azmaria. Chrono, catching up to Rosette, becomes trapped in a ring of fire, ignited by Aion's sword, which was given by Shader. Joshua screams in pain when his horns grow, and Chrono is consequently shot to the ground. The ritual of atonement commences, wreaking havoc in the city. When Satella arrives, she is stopped by Fiore, revealed to be her older sister. Rosette is awakened after the ritual is performed. A spiral of astral lines appear in the sky, and the city begins to evacuate. Chrono hears her call out his name when Aion kisses her. By release of the seal of the soul timepiece, Chrono transform as he makes his first move.
| 20 | "Poison"; Transliteration: "Doku" (Japanese: 毒) | Katsuichi Nakayama | Atsuhiro Tomioka | April 22, 2004 | June 30, 2006 |
Joshua battles Chrono aggressively in the sky, causing mass destruction within the city. Genai is stopped by Duffau when he attacks Father Remington. Seeing Rosette in Aion's clutches, Chrono flies down to save her, but he is blindsided by Joshua's attacked. In response, Chrono grabs hold of Joshua's horn, making him yell in agony. However, Chrono turns into stone when he rips off the horns from Joshua's head. Duffau destroys Genai, and Father Remington eradicates Shader. Aion escapes with Rosette in his possession. Back at the convent, Duffau explains that the ritual of atonement can be meant to purify or taint the soul of a human being, whether performed by an angel or a devil. Father Remington and Reverend Gilliam believes that Aion is planning to use the deterrence of Rosette as a weapon. Elsewhere, Aion shows Rosette the end result of what Chrono and Joshua did to the city, all in love for her sake. Aion asks her to join his side in order to save the inhabitants of the San Francisco. Rosette agrees to his proposition, but she still wears the soul timepiece as a reminder for her life.
| 21 | "Magdalene"; Transliteration: "Magudarēna" (Japanese: マグダレーナ) | Noriaki Akitaya | Atsuhiro Tomioka | April 29, 2004 | July 7, 2006 |
Satella is upset that Fiore sees Joshua as her younger brother, and Azmaria is confused as to why she survived after the ritual of atonement. In the past, Mary Magdalene dreams of Chrono as a frightening devil in distress. Moments after Chrono arrives to see her, Father Remington has come to slay the devil. Chrono luckily escapes with Mary Magdalene and finds out that she can predict the future. The two find Aion, who has ripped off his horns. Aion is taken to see the other sinners, constructing the soul timepiece and preparing ritual of atonement. Mary Magdalene unveils to Chrono her stigmata, carrying the memories of all souls except her own. She also states that her own death will be in the hands of Chrono. She warns him that Aion will soon betray him. Instead of performing the ritual of atonement on a peak, Aion orders Chrono to end Mary Magdalene's life, but he hesitates. Aion strikes Chrono with a single blow, badly wounding him. However, Mary Magdalene takes Chrono to the meadow below, where she issues a contract with him using the soul timepiece in order to save his life in place of hers. In the present, Chrono remembers what led to the tomb of Mary Magdalene. He unfreezes from stone, and he later learns that Joshua is amnesiac. Meanwhile, Aion is surrounded by Duffau and the pursuers, but they were no match against him. Gurio, informing Chrono that Rosette is responsible for Duffau's death, disappears right in front of him.
| 22 | "Farewell"; Transliteration: "Sayonara" (Japanese: さよなら) | Toshiyuki Katō | Kiyoko Yoshimura | May 20, 2004 | July 14, 2006 |
Satella reminisces to when Fiore motivated her in using her jewelsummoning powers. Elder Hamilton gives Chrono a sword with Enochian texts engraved into the blade, allowing Chrono to battle against Aion without having to transform. Fiore breaks out of the convent, taking Joshua with her. Rosette is to use her power of miracles to heal the sick and wounded under the command of Aion. Rosette soon gathers a large crowd of people who refer to her as a savior. Satella spots Fiore with Joshua, and she forges a jewelsummoning barrier. Failing to convince her to be her sister, Satella is forced to spar against Fiore. After Chrono touches Rosette's bloodstained wrist, Aion exposes Chrono as a devil in front of the crowd. Fiore reveals that she is the shadow of Satella's sister who died ten years ago by Aion's heads. Satella embraces Fiore and then stabs both of them using her jewel, causing Fiore to remember Satella before she passes away. Satella is found heavily bruised, as she tells Chrono to find Rosette and asks Azmaria to sing before her life ends.
| 23 | "The Noise"; Transliteration: "Noizu" (Japanese: ノイズ) | Hiroyuki Kanbe | Atsuhiro Tomioka | June 3, 2004 | July 21, 2006 |
Chrono meets Rosette and Aion at an abandoned church, where Rosette demands her life back from Chrono. Aion also provokes Chrono by mentioning that he is destined to take Rosette's life. Chrono ends up letting Aion getting away with Rosette. Father Remington and Elder Hamilton says that the crowd is condemning the Magdalene Order. Showing Azmaria his horns next to Satella's coffin, Chrono blames himself for having killed the few that were dear to him, all in previously siding with Aion for obtaining freedom from sin. A photographer delivers a picture to Azmaria that was taken with her friends during the carnival. He also gives a picture of Rosette exposing her wrists to Sister Kate, who shows it to Father Remington and Elder Hamilton. Sister Kate later tells the Council of the Catholic Church that many people are carving cross-shaped marks in their wrists to crusade in hopes for freedom. Azmaria shows Chrono the picture taken at the carnival, as he realizes that he must not run away from his problems. Chrono is led to Central Park, where Aion hands Rosette her gun to end Chrono's life. Chrono throws his horns at Aion in order to turn him to stone and release control of Rosette. This does not stop him, however, as he throws his own horns back at Chrono, severely weakening him. Rosette releases the seal of the soul timepiece, transforming and healing Chrono. He is finally able to defeat Aion, but he is injured in the process.
| 24 | "Chrono"; Transliteration: "Kurono" (Japanese: クロノ) | Yū Kō; Yūki Ukai | Atsuhiro Tomioka | June 10, 2004 | July 28, 2006 |
The Seventh Bell Orphanage returns to normal, having the orphans revived and the building unfrozen. Sister Kate tells the owner of the orphanage that Rosette and Chrono are nowhere to be found, and Azmaria sings for the orphans. Father Remington and Elder Hamilton travel underground to the tomb of Mary Magdalene, seeing Aion's horns here. It is understood that Aion's horns move time while Chrono's horns freeze time. Nobody seems to know the whereabouts of Rosette and Chrono. Joshua tells Father Remington that he is currently writing a novel about a girl, her younger brother, and her extraterrestrial partner who travel on the astral lines to defeat the devils. Rosette and Chrono are seen sitting outside on a porch watching the sunset, as they spend their day on Earth. Azmaria hears word of their location, and she cries when she sees them smiling and holding hands in death. Sister Kate talks with Father Remington over the phone about how Rosette shows goodness and mercy even being bound by contract with a devil. They both are concerned about the prophecy of war that is soon being fulfilled. Azmaria prays for Rosette at her tombstone. Years later on May 13, 1981, Father Remington is shock after shortly seeing Aion in the Vatican shortly before the shooting of Pope John Paul II.

== See also ==
- List of Chrono Crusade chapters
