= List of Fate/Stay Night chapters =

The cover of the first volume of the Fate route manga, released by Kadokawa Shoten on May 26, 2006, in Japan

The Japanese visual novel video game Fate/Stay Night by Type-Moon was adapted into three separate manga adaptations, with each adapting one of the three routes of Fate/stay night—Fate, Unlimited Blade Works and Heaven's Feel. The manga series covering the Fate route was serialized in Type-Moon's Comic Ace web magazine and Kadokawa Shoten's Monthly Shōnen Ace magazine from December 26, 2005, to November 17, 2012, with its chapters being collected into twenty tankōbon volumes. In December 2007, it was licensed for an English language release in North America by Tokyopop. Tokyopop announced that they were shutting down their North American manga publishing division in April 2011, halting the serialization of manga's volumes. In 2014, Viz Media's Viz Select imprint would later re-issue the first ten volumes of the Fate/stay night manga digitally.

The second manga, Fate/stay night: Heaven's Feel (フェイトステイナイトヘブンズ フィール, Feito/sutei naito: Hebunzu Fīru), was written by Taskohna and had begun serialization in May 2015 in Kadokawa's Young Ace magazine. It focuses on the relationship between Sakura Matou and Shirou Emiya, who abandons his heroic aspirations to protect Sakura and the corruption of the Holy Grail War.

The third manga series, Fate/stay night: Unlimited Blade Works (フェイトステイナイトアンリミテッドブレードワークス, Feito/sutei naito: Anrimiteddoburēdowākusu), was written by Daisuke Moriyama and serialized in Kadokawa's Dengeki Daioh magazine. The story focuses on the relationship between Rin Tohsaka and Shirou Emiya, as they fight in the fifth Holy Grail War.

== Volume list ==
=== Fate ===
No.	Original release date	Original ISBN	English release date	English ISBN
1	May 26, 2006	4-04-713825-8	October 14, 2008	978-1-42-781037-3
Sign of the Holy Grail (聖杯のしるし, Seihai no Shirushi); The Night of Summoning (召喚の夜, Shōkan no Yoru); The Seventh Servant (第七の召使い, Dainana no Meshitsukai); The Girl of Steel (I) (鋼鉄の少女, Kōtetsu no Shōjo); The Girl of Steel (II) (鋼鉄少女二, Kōtetsu Shōjo Ni); The Girl of Steel (III) (鋼鉄少女三つ, Kōtetsu Shōjo Mittsu); The Girl of Steel (IV) (鋼鉄少女二4, Kōtetsu Shōjo Yon)
2	October 24, 2006	4-04-713865-7	December 30, 2008	978-4-04-713865-0
The Girl in the Mansion (大邸宅の少女, Dai Teitaku no Shōjo); The Unbeatable Berserker (無敵のバーサーカー, Muteki no Bāsākā); Command Seal (コマンドシール, Komandoshīru); The Knight of the Wind (風の騎士, Kaze no Kishi); The Enemy is Berserker (敵はバーサーカー, Teki wa Bāsākā)
3	April 5, 2007	4-04-713914-9	April 7, 2009	978-1-42-781146-2
Boys & Girls (VI); Boys & Girls (VII); Partner (I); Partner (II); Partner (III)
4	September 26, 2007	978-4-04-713955-8	July 14, 2009	978-1-42-781274-2
Sword & Magic (I); Sword & Magic (II); Sword & Magic (III); STEP; Bonus: Dragon VS. Tiger (竜虎激突, Ryūko Gekitotsu)
5	December 26, 2007	978-4-04-713995-4	September 29, 2009	978-1-42-781303-9
Omen (予兆, Yochō); Midnight Visitor (真夜中の訪問者, Mayonaka no Hōmonsha); Declaration (宣告, Senkoku); Blood Fort Andromeda (ブラッドフォート・アンドロメダ, Buraddofōto Andoromeda); Bonus II: Recollection (追憶, Tsuioku)
Rider and Shinji Matou are up to no good again, this time everyone is bound to suffer. As Shirou Emiya wrestles with his feelings of the dramatic changes in Shinji, he attempts to bring his friend back to reality, believing there's still good in him. Shirou struggles to reconcile the gradual complications in his relationship with Saber.
6	April 26, 2008	978-4-04-715047-8	December 29, 2009	978-1-42-781628-3
Breaker Gorgon (自己封印・暗黒神殿, Jiko Fūin Ankoku Shinden); Skyscraper (I); Skyscraper (II); Noble Phantasm
7	August 26, 2008	978-4-04-715094-2	March 30, 2010	978-1-42-781629-0
What Happened Ten Years Ago (10年の真実, Jū Nen no Shinjitsu); Altria; Rule Breaker (ルールブレイカ, Rūru Bureika); Soichiro Kuzuki (葛木宗一郎, Kuzuki Sōichirō); Bonus III: Threads of Destiny (綾糸, Ayaito)
8	December 26, 2008	978-4-04-715144-4	June 29, 2010	978-1-42-781759-4
The Moonlit Temple Gate (月下の山門, Gekka no Sanmon); Antihero (反英雄, Han Eiyū); Night Fog (夜霧, Yogiri); The Blade of Betrayal (裏切りの刃, Uragiri no Yaiba); Bonus IV: The Priest's Gift (神父の贈り物, Shinpu no Okurimono)
9	April 25, 2009	978-4-04-715230-4	September 28, 2010	978-1-42-781760-0
Innocent World; Intruder; Twin Swords (双剣, Sōken); The Saint in the Crypt (クリプタの聖女, Kuriputa no Seijo); Bonus V: Roaring
10	August 26, 2009	978-4-04-715283-0	February 1, 2011	978-1-42-781788-4
Hurled Deathstrike (突き穿つ死翔の槍, Tsukiugatsu Shishō no Yari); Joker; Partner; Dead Man Walking
11	December 26, 2009	978-4-04-715348-6	May 10, 2011	978-1-42-780626-0
12	April 26, 2010	978-4-04-715424-7	—	—
13	August 26, 2010	978-4-04-715502-2	—	—
14	December 29, 2010	978-4-04-715585-5	—	—
15	April 26, 2011	978-4-04-715680-7	—	—
16	September 3, 2011	978-4-04-715764-4	—	—
17	December 26, 2011	978-4-04-120049-0	—	—
18	April 26, 2012	978-4-04-120202-9	—	—
19	August 25, 2012	978-4-04-120359-0	—	—
20	November 26, 2012	978-4-04-120501-3	—	—

=== Heaven's Feel ===
No.	Japanese release date	Japanese ISBN
1	June 26, 2015	978-4-04-103397-5
2	February 4, 2016	978-4-04-103769-0
3	September 3, 2016	978-4-04-104686-9
4	June 2, 2017	978-4-04-105647-9
5	October 10, 2017	978-4-04-106094-0
6	August 4, 2018	978-4-04-107163-2
7	January 10, 2019	978-4-04-107164-9
8	February 26, 2020	978-4-04-109108-1
9	December 28, 2021	978-4-04-112117-7
10	April 4, 2023	978-4-04-113359-0
11	February 4, 2025	978-4-04-115976-7
12	November 4, 2026	978-4-04-117887-4

=== Unlimited Blade Works ===
No.	Japanese release date	Japanese ISBN
1	August 26, 2022	978-4-04-914556-4
2	December 9, 2022	978-4-04-914771-1
3	June 27, 2023	978-4-04-915102-2
4	December 26, 2023	978-4-04-915450-4
5	June 27, 2024	978-4-04-915757-4
6	December 27, 2024	978-4-04-916116-8
7	July 26, 2025	978-4-04-916492-3
8	March 27, 2026	978-4-04-952162-7

== Reception ==
=== Fate ===
The 2006 Fate/Stay Night manga based on the Fate route of the visual novel had ranked at number 18 in Anime News Network's Japanese Comic Ranking with a total of 37,314 copies in the week of April 23-29, 2012. In August 2012, it had a total of 27,593 weekly copies in circulation. By November 2012, the manga had 40,413 total copies in circulation.
