= Fate/Stay Night =

2004 Japanese visual novel game

- Original game cover by Takashi Takeuchi, featuring Saber (in the center), Illya (lower right), (then counterclockwise) Lancer, Rin Tohsaka, Archer, Sakura Matou, and Berserker
- Developer: Type-Moon (Note: Ported to PlayStation 2 and Vita by HuneX)
- Publishers: Type-Moon (Windows); Kadokawa Shoten (PS2, Vita); Aniplex (NS, Steam)
- Artist: Takashi Takeuchi
- Writer: Kinoko Nasu
- Composers: Keita Haga (Note: Credited under the pseudonym KATE); Daisuke Nagata (Note: Credited under the pseudonym James Harris)
- Series: Fate
- Engine: KiriKiri
- Platforms: Windows, PlayStation 2, PlayStation Vita, iOS, Android, Nintendo Switch
- Release: Windows: JP: January 30, 2004; WW: August 8, 2024; PlayStation 2: JP: April 19, 2007; PlayStation Vita: JP: November 29, 2012; iOS: JP: April 18, 2015; Android: JP: May 29, 2015; Nintendo Switch: WW: August 8, 2024
- Genre: Visual novel
- Mode: Single-player

Fate/Stay Night (stylized as Fate/stay night) is a Japanese visual novel game developed by Type-Moon. It was initially released on January 30, 2004, for Windows PCs as an adult game, with Type-Moon later releasing versions of Fate/Stay Night without the erotic content. The story takes place through three distinct routes: Fate, Unlimited Blade Works, and Heaven's Feel. It focuses on a teenager named Shirou Emiya, who joins the Holy Grail War; a battle between mages called "Masters" and their "Servants". In each route, Shirou bonds with a heroine and confronts different adversaries participating in the war. An enhanced version, Fate/Stay Night Réalta Nua, was released in April 2007 for the PlayStation 2. Realta Nua was later ported to Windows in 2011, PlayStation Vita in 2012, and Android and iOS in 2015. A remastered version of Réalta Nua was released for Nintendo Switch and PC, through digital video game distribution service Steam in August 2024, marking the game's first release outside Japan.

Fate/Stay Night was a critical and commercial success and is considered a defining work in the visual novel genre. The game was regarded as the highest-selling visual novel in Japan at the time of its release. Type-Moon later went on to produce an adult spin-off called Fate/Hollow Ataraxia in October 2005, which expanded on the events of Fate/Stay Night eight months later. Fate/Stay Night has received several anime and manga adaptations, beginning with a 24-episode anime series by Studio Deen, based on the Fate route. It aired in Japan between January and June 2006. A film adaptation, Fate/Stay Night: Unlimited Blade Works, also by Studio Deen, was released in January 2010. A second anime television series, Fate/Stay Night: Unlimited Blade Works, was produced by Ufotable and aired between October 2014 and June 2015. A film trilogy by Ufotable adapted the Heaven's Feel route, consisting of three films: Presage Flower (2017), Lost Butterfly (2019), and Spring Song (2020).

There have been multiple manga adaptations based on Fate/Stay Night published by ASCII Media Works, Kadokawa Shoten and Ichijinsha. The first manga series adaptation by Datto Nishiwaki began serialization in the Shōnen Ace magazine between February 2006 and December 2012. A second manga adaptation, based on the Heaven's Feel route, was illustrated by Taskohna, and began serialization in 2015 in Kadokawa Shoten's Young Ace. A third manga adaptation, based on Unlimited Blade Works and illustrated by Daisuke Moriyama, began in 2021 in ASCII Media Works' Dengeki Daioh.

== Gameplay ==
Text in Fate/Stay Night is displayed in a dialog box, here depicting Saber talking to the player's character, Shirou.

Fate/Stay Night is a dark fantasy visual novel game that requires minimal interaction from players, as most of the game's duration is spent reading the text that appears, which is either the inner thoughts of the protagonist, narration, or dialogue. Players come to a decision point where they are given a chance to choose from options displayed on the screen, typically two to three at a time. The time between these decision points is variable. During these times, gameplay pauses until a choice is made that furthers the plot in a specific direction. There are three main plot lines that the player will have the chance to experience, one for each of the heroines in the story. To view all three plot lines, the player must replay the game multiple times and choose different choices during the decision points to progress the plot in an alternate direction. Finishing one route will unlock the next one. When interacting with the heroines in each route, an "affection meter" is created, which is raised by giving them an answer that pleases them. A "True Ending" can be unlocked depending on the player's affection.

There are multiple ways in which players can lose the game, including Shirou's death or a decision that causes the heroine to be murdered. Should this happen, the player is taken to an area called the Tiger Dojo (タイガー道場, Taigā Dōjō) where Taiga Fujimura and Illyasviel von Einzbern give the players hints about what they should do to survive in the next attempt to complete the game.

== Plot ==
The story follows Shirou Emiya, a hardworking and honest teenager who unknowingly enters a to-the-death tournament between mages known as the Fifth Holy Grail War. Combatants fight with magecraft and Heroes from throughout history for a chance to have their wishes granted by the eponymous Holy Grail. Orphaned and the sole survivor of a massive fire in Fuyuki City as a child, Shirou was taken in by a retired mage named Kiritsugu Emiya who had died a few years ago. His perceived responsibility to those who died and his salvation through his father formed a strong desire for justice and peace in him. Thus, he earnestly trains his body and minuscule ability with magecraft to someday greatly help others, even if people often abuse his generosity at his stage.

One evening, after seeing two devastatingly powerful beings trading blows at his school with swords and spears, he is attacked, as witnesses of the supernatural are generally supposed to be eliminated. Chased to his home by the spear-wielding warrior Lancer and barely able to avoid his attacks, Shirou is about to be killed when he is saved by Saber. Saber, the personification of a renowned figure in history, was created to aid participants in the War. In her supposedly accidental summoning and the appearance of the marks on Shirou's hand, his entry as a Master into the Holy Grail War is formalized.

=== Fate ===
The first of the three heroines, Saber, is a mighty warrior who keeps her identity secret, hence her substitute name after her role as a member of the Saber class. She also serves as the route's servant protagonist. She was the victor of the Fourth Holy Grail War with another Master and claimed to be the strongest out of all Servants in the Saber Class. However, Shirou is against Saber's constant aim for conflicts with other servants and instead seeks to ally with Rin. Shirou drops his pacifism when he discovers that his former friend, Shinji Matou, is a Master with the Servant Rider, aiming to sacrifice all students from their school to increase the Rider's powers.

Following Shinji and Rider's defeat, Shirou learns that Saber cannot fight at full strength without exchanging Mana (magical energy) with her Master. During a confrontation with Master Illya and her Servant Berserker, Shirou has part of his magical circuits ripped out from his system and sacrificed to Saber to create a connection to her, and later assists her in defeating the enemy by projecting one of Artoria's lost swords, the Sword-in-the-Stone Caliburn, in combat. As Shirou seeks to keep Saber in their world, he learns from the priest Kirei Kotomine that the Holy Grail is cursed. It is revealed that Shirou's late guardian, Kiritsugu, once used Saber to destroy the Grail. However, it instead caused the fire where Shirou lost his family.

After realizing it, Shirou rejects the idea of accepting his wish for the Holy Grail as he decides to accept his past and never forget Saber. Moved by Shirou's will, Saber also rejects the Holy Grail, believing she should not change Britain's history and that she should accept herself. As Kotomine aims to use Illya's body to recreate the Holy Grail, Shirou and Saber confront him and his Servant, Gilgamesh. Following his victory, Shirou instructs Saber to destroy the Grail, causing Saber to return to her last moments before she dies, finally accepting her life. In the Réalta Nua version of the game, an overarching ending can be unlocked after all the routes, where Shirou fulfills his roles as a heroic spirit in order to meet Saber in Avalon.

=== Unlimited Blade Works ===
The second of the three heroines is Rin Tohsaka, a model student and idol of Shirou's school who is secretly a mage and Master of Archer in the Holy Grail War. Her Servant Archer serves as the Servant protagonist of the route. She descends from a long, distinguished line of mages, with the potential to become one of the 100 strongest human magi. Classmates dub Rin "The Ice Queen" for her cold, unreachable persona at school; however, this is simply a front to hide her actual status as a mage. Her presence in the story is established after Lancer mortally wounds Shirou at school. Upon seeing him, she revives him due to his connection with Sakura Matou, with whom Rin is closely acquainted. The two become allies in the war, unaware of Archer's true identity as an adult Shirou from one of the series' numerous alternate universes.

Shirou loses control of Saber during the story, but aims to fight with his magical strength to stop the war. Archer betrays Rin and reveals his despondency and bitterness over his past choices to Shirou. He subsequently challenges Shirou to a fight, hoping to destroy his story of being a hero. However, Shirou accepts his future regardless of his regrets and misery, sticking to Kiritsugu's ideals. Gilgamesh tries to kill Archer and Shirou, with the former seemingly sacrificing himself to protect the latter. Later, Rin passes Shirou her Mana to fight Gilgamesh to replicate Archer's powers. As Gilgamesh almost drags Shirou into their deaths, Archer uses his last strength to save the latter. In the True Ending, Shirou and Rin move to London to study magecraft, as well as start a romantic relationship.

=== Heaven's Feel ===
The third and final heroine is Sakura, a first-year high school student and longtime friend of Shirou's, who often visits his home to help him with his daily chores. A quiet, soft-spoken girl, Sakura can be surprisingly stubborn and holds a deep, unparalleled affection for Shirou. She is revealed to be Rin's long-lost sister, raised by the Matou family, and has since suffered their abuse while training as a mage. Sakura is also discovered as the true Master of Rider, whom she reasserts control of from Shinji, making Rider the Servant protagonist of the route. In the route, Saber and Berserker are consumed by the shadows of Angra Mainyu. In the ensuing battle with True Assassin and the corrupted servants, a mortally wounded Archer transplants his left arm to save a dying Shirou.

Sakura's adoptive grandfather, Zouken, is revealed as the one who placed a shard of the lesser grail from the 4th Holy Grail War in her body, infecting Sakura with Angra Mainyu. She becomes Dark Sakura, killing Shinji in his attempt to rape her. Despite the threat Sakura poses to humanity, Shirou, having fallen in love with her, abandons his ideal in favor of saving Sakura, despite Rin's initial objections. Upon learning that Illya is another sacrifice to create the Grail, Shirou teams up with Kotomine and uses Archer's powers to save Illya from Berserker. Rin is injured after finding herself unable to kill Sakura, while Rider and Shirou successfully eliminate Saber Alter. Shirou talks to Sakura and helps her regain her humanity, freeing her from her contract with Angra Mainyu. He then faces Kotomine in a final battle to later destroy the Grail. In True Ending, after Kotomine dies in combat, Illya sacrifices herself to destroy the Grail and extracts Shirou's soul using a weaker version of the Third Magic. Rider later returns to the cave to grab and bring Shirou's soul home, and Rin places it within a puppet body. Shirou, Sakura, and Rider live peacefully in Japan, while Rin moves to London to study magecraft.

== Development ==
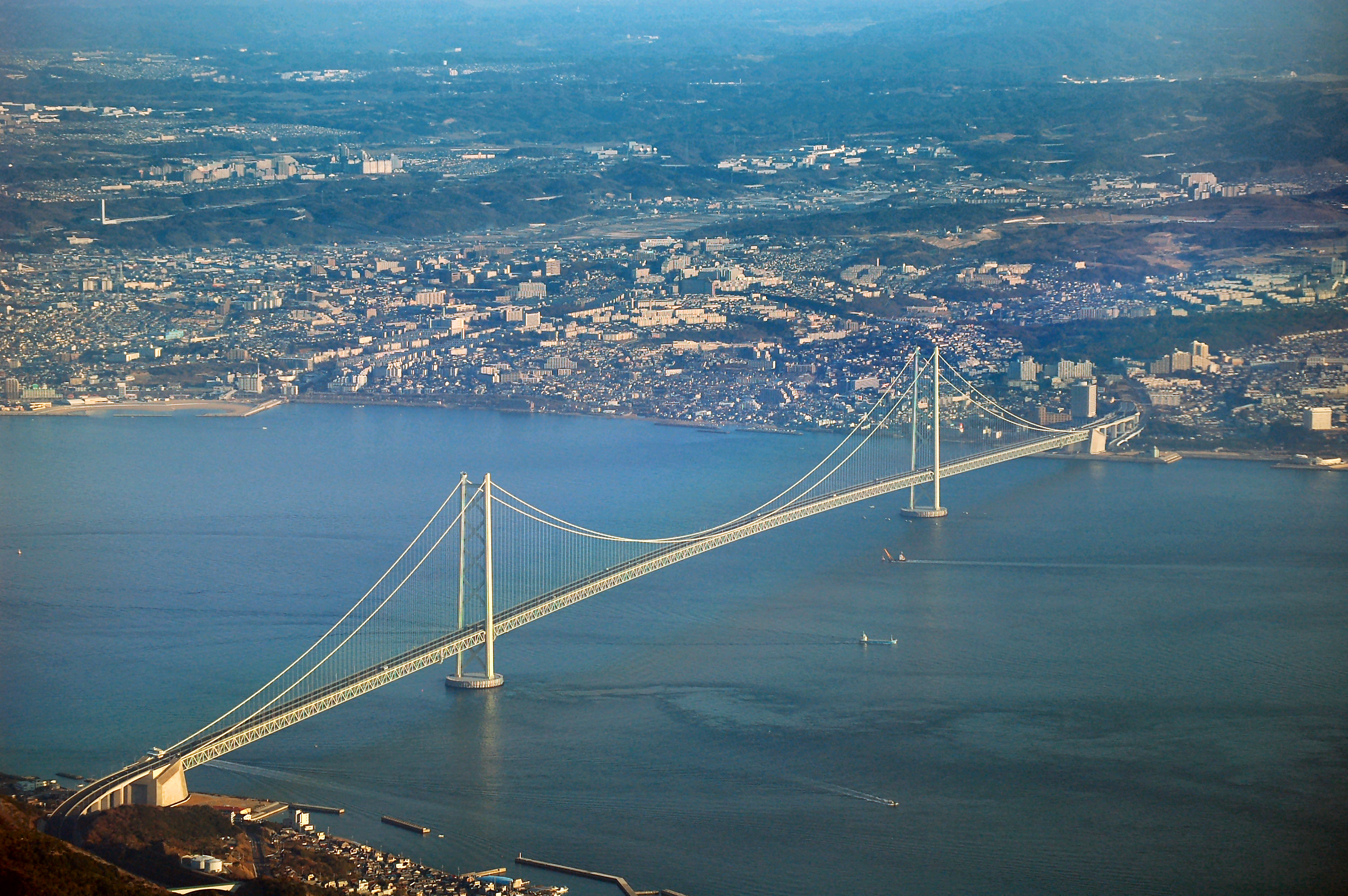
Akashi Bridge became the prototype of one of the locations of the city of Fuyuki.

Japanese author Kinoko Nasu began writing Fate/Stay Night in college, initially not intending for it to be a game. He only wrote what would become the game's Fate route, and later came up with the idea of Fate/Stay Night having three distinct storylines. In Nasu's early drafts, Saber was originally a man, and Shirou was a girl with glasses. This early draft was later embodied in the short original video animation (OVA) Fate/Prototype, which was released with the final volume of the Carnival Phantasm OVA series. In 1999, Nasu set the project aside, and co-founded Type-Moon with Japanese artist Takashi Takeuchi. After the success of their first visual novel Tsukihime in 2000, Type-Moon transitioned from a dōjin soft organization to a commercial organization. Nasu and Takeuchi decided to turn the old Fate story into a visual novel as Type-Moon's first commercial product. In the beginning, Nasu was worried that because the main character was a girl, the story might not work as a bishōjo game. Takeuchi suggested switching the protagonist's and Saber's genders to fit the game market.

Japanese writer Futaro Yamada's historical fantasy novel Makai Tenshō influenced Nasu to write a fantasy story in which famous heroic personalities from all over the world took part. The original idea was limited to the prototype of the Fate arc, where the main characters were the female master and her Servant Saber (the embodiment of King Arthur as a man). According to Nasu, this version contained elements of 1980s romance and ideas of transformations to world order, while the final version focuses on changes within people and has other purposes for using the Holy Grail. About a third of the scenario of the future Fate arc (up to the battle with Sasaki Kojiro) was completed at that time, but for several personal reasons, Nasu could not write further for more than ten years.

The first two completed story arcs were Fate and Unlimited Blade Works; with the latter being partially presented to the public in a preview booklet at Comiket in December 2001. Unlimited Blade Works was based on the idea of a character's confrontation with himself and his own ideals, something unrealized during the development of Tsukihime for the arc of Yumizuka Satsuki. In 2002, it was found that the content that was already written was nearly equal in length to Tsukihime, leading to proposals to divide the game into two parts. However, due to the high cost of releasing two products at once, the arcs of Illya and Sakura were partially combined, resulting in Heaven's Feel. Nasu initially thought of extending the Fate route involving an alternative Fifth Holy Grail War where Shirou fought alongside Saber without a romantic relationship developing between them. Following their separation, Shirou would bond with Rin in a similar way to the true ending of Unlimited Blade Works. The main theme in Fate/Stay Night is "conquering oneself". There are three storylines in the visual novel; each has a different theme. The first route, Fate, is "oneself as an ideal", while the second, Unlimited Blade Works, is the "struggling with oneself as an ideal". The third and final one, Heaven's Feel, is "the friction with real and ideal".

According to Nasu, the main theme of the resulting Heaven's Feel arc was chosen to apply the protagonist's ideas in practice. This is in contrast to Fate and Unlimited Blade Works, which paid most attention to the demonstration of Shirou's ideals. Nasu wanted to portray him as a typical teenager while Takeuchi did not want him to have too much individuality to make players project themselves onto him. In 2002, Takeuchi suggested Gen Urobuchi, a well-known author of Nitroplus visual novels, to connect to the preliminary scenario of the game, but Urobuchi ultimately refused. Afterward, Nasu decided that Fate/Stay Night would be the most significant work in his life, created by him from beginning to end.

=== Release history ===
After editing background images and sprites, translating the text into code, and debugging audio-visual effects, on October 21, 2003, the game's demo version was released on a CD with the magazine Tech Gian from Enterbrain, and on November 1 was posted on Type-Moon's site. Fate/Stay Night was released in Japan on January 30, 2004, for Windows PCs. The opening animations were produced by Tatsunoko Productions.

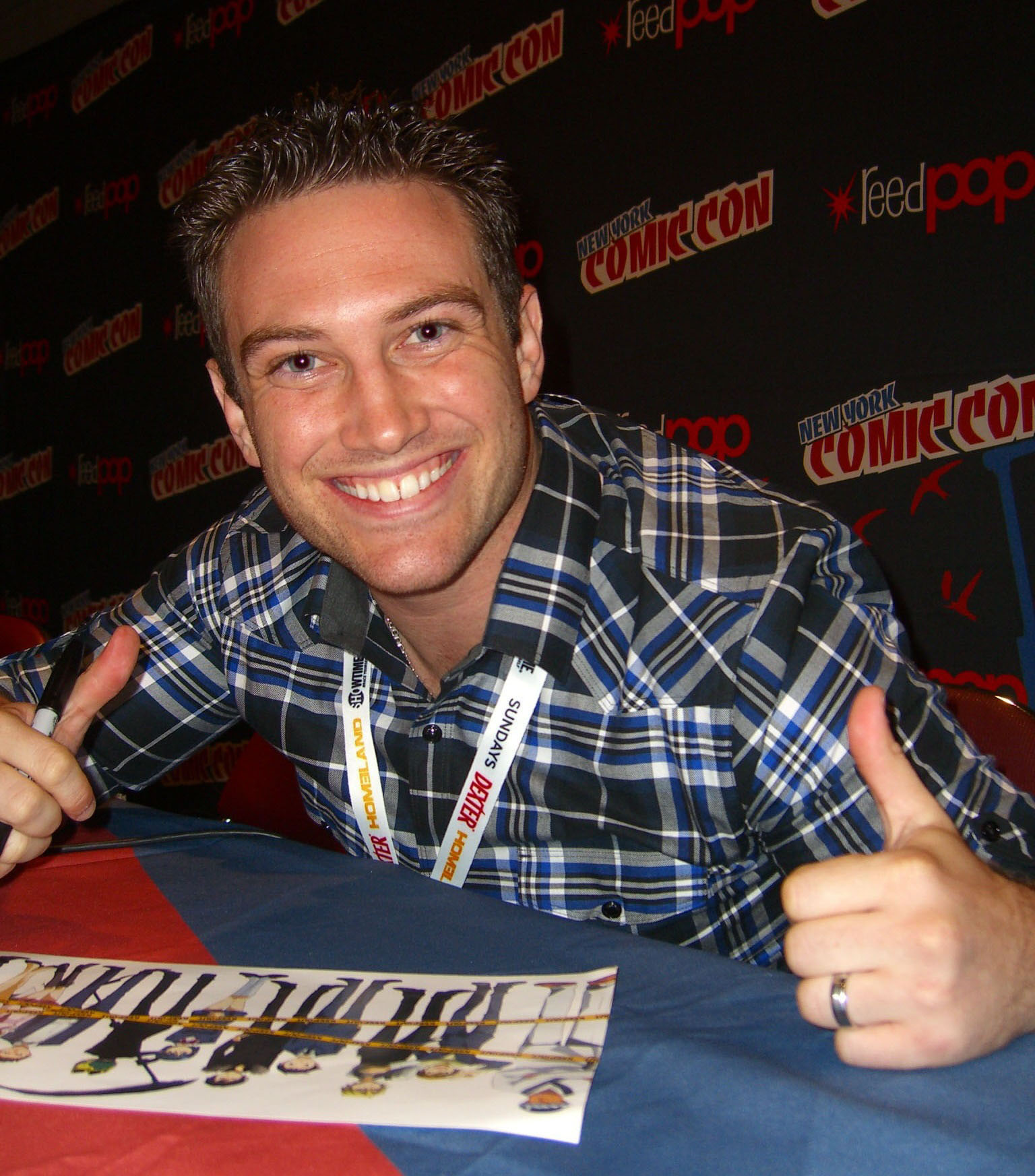
Bryce Papenbrook voiced Shirou Emiya in the English version of Fate/Stay Night.

A CERO C-rated version of Fate/Stay Night, titled Fate/Stay Night Réalta Nua, for the PlayStation 2 was scheduled to release in late 2006. However, it was postponed until April 19, 2007. This version excluded sexual content and added an extended ending scene to the Fate storyline, and featured voice actors from the 2006 anime series. In the Fate route, the adult content in the original release was replaced with an anticipated scene from the writers, of which was eventually expanded with a subsequent prequel novel. This "Magical Circuit Grafting" scene was highly abstract and symbolic, revealing the Dragon's Core aspect of Saber's character that would subsequently remain as a key part of her characterization through the franchise into her appearance in Fate/Grand Order.

The updated re-release had provided this part of the route's 'Day 10 & 11', alongside its true ending. Tatsunoko Productions produced three opening animations, based on the three branching storylines in the game, Fate, Unlimited Blade Works, and Heaven's Feel. All the routes were released separately through digital download on Windows (but as the Réalta Nua version) at the beginning of 2012. A PlayStation Vita port of Réalta Nua was released in Japan in November 2012, with three new opening animations by anime studio Ufotable and the option to change the aspect ratio to 4:3, 16:9 or in-between. On January 30, 2024, Type-Moon announced Fate/Stay Night Remastered. It was published by Aniplex worldwide on August 8, 2024, for the Nintendo Switch and Windows via Steam with Japanese, English and Simplified Chinese language options. The remaster was based on the PS Vita version of Réalta Nua, and marks the first official release of the visual novel outside Japan.

Since its inception, there have been only small changes to Shirou's physical design. With red hair and stubborn eyes, Takeuchi aimed for a typical design of a straightforward shōnen manga genre character. However, he felt that it was too standard, so he added more circles around his eyes. Takeuchi has trouble bringing out Shirou's expressions because of his unique eyebrows; as a result, Shirou remains the most difficult Fate/Stay Night character for him to draw. Their goal of creating "a protagonist without a face" to comply with the nature of bishōjo games in the initial release of Fate/Stay Night is another reason Takeuchi had trouble drawing Shirou, who only appeared in a handful of scenes. In the re-released Réalta Nua version of the visual novel aimed at teenagers rather than just adults, the importance of showing non-adult content was increased. So Takeuchi had to draw Shirou more often.

On October 28, 2005, Type-Moon released a sequel to Fate/Stay Night, titled Fate/hollow ataraxia. Its plot is set half a year after the events of Fate/Stay Night and features new characters such as Avenger, Bazett Fraga McRemitz, and Caren Ortensia, alongside returning characters such as Shirō Emiya, Saber and Rin Tōsaka.

== Adaptations ==
=== Manga ===
- Fate/Stay Night

フェイト/ステイナイト (Feito/Sutei Naito)
- Genre: Adventure, dark fantasy
- Manga
- Fate/Stay Night; Himuro no Tenchi Fate/school Life; Fate/Stay Night: Heaven's Feel; Fate/Stay Night: Unlimited Blade Works
- TV series
- Fate/Stay Night; Fate/Stay Night: Unlimited Blade Works
- Films
- Fate/Stay Night: Unlimited Blade Works; Fate/Stay Night: Heaven's Feel; Fate/Stay Night: Heaven's Feel I. Presage Flower; Fate/Stay Night: Heaven's Feel II. Lost Butterfly; Fate/Stay Night: Heaven's Feel III. Spring Song

The Fate/Stay Night manga adaptation, illustrated by Datto Nishiwaki, was serialized in Kadokawa Shoten's manga magazine Shōnen Ace between February 2006 and December 2012. Extras were also published in Ace Assault and Type-Moon Ace. The manga combines the Fate and Unlimited Blade Works scenarios of the visual novel and some elements from the Heaven's Feel scenario while primarily following the Fate scenario. Twenty tankōbon volumes were released in Japan between May 26, 2006, and November 26, 2012. The manga was licensed for an English-language release in North America by German-American entertainment company Tokyopop in 2007. In April 2011, Tokyopop announced the shutdown of their North American manga publishing division, and the 11th volume of the Fate/Stay Night manga was the last to be released. Viz Media's Viz Select imprint had later re-released the first ten volumes of the manga digitally in 2014.

A second Fate/Stay Night manga based entirely on the Heaven's Feel route was illustrated by Taskohna and began serialization in the June 2015 issue of Kadokawa Shoten's Young Ace on May 2, 2015. The third manga adaptation, based on Unlimited Blade Works route was illustrated by Japanese manga artist Daisuke Moriyama and began serialization in December 2021 in ASCII Media Works's manga magazine Dengeki Daioh.

Himuro no Tenchi Fate/School Life is a comedy 4-koma manga revolving around the everyday life at school of the minor characters of Fate/stay night and Fate/Hollow Ataraxia, specifically the character Kane Himuro, a classmate of Fate/stay night protagonist Shirō Emiya. It was written by Eiichirou Mashin and serialized in Manga 4-koma Kings Palette between November 25, 2006, and January 27, 2025, across fifteen compiled volumes published by Ichijinsha.

=== Anime ===
The original Fate/Stay Night anime series aired between January 7 and June 17, 2006, containing 24 episodes; the storyline follows mainly the Fate route but shows parts of other scenarios. It was produced by the Fate Project, and included TBS, CREi, Geneon Entertainment, Type Moon, and Frontier Works. Kenji Kawai composed the score for the series. The series later received its international television premieres on the anime television network Animax in 2007, its English-language television premiere occurring on Animax's English networks in Southeast Asia in June, as well as its other networks in South Korea, Hong Kong and other regions. In July 2008, Geneon Entertainment and Funimation Entertainment announced an agreement to distribute select titles in North America. While Geneon Entertainment retained the license, Funimation Entertainment assumed exclusive rights to the manufacturing, marketing, sales, and distribution of select titles. Fate/Stay Night was one of several titles involved in the deal. The television series was re-issued in Japan on January 22, 2010, in two 60-minute special edition DVD/Blu-ray volumes to commemorate the release of the film adaptation Fate/Stay Night: Unlimited Blade Works the next day.

An anime television series, Fate/Stay Night: Unlimited Blade Works, was produced by Ufotable as a follow-up to their adaptation of Fate/Zero, and aired on Tokyo MX between October 2014 and June 2015. The Fate/Stay Night: Heaven's Feel film trilogy by Ufotable adapted the Heaven's Feel route, consisting of three films: Presage Flower (2017), Lost Butterfly (2019), and Spring Song (2020).

=== Internet radio shows ===
An Internet radio show to promote the Fate/stay night anime series called Feito/Sutei Chūn (フェイト/ステイ チューン) was broadcast between February 22, 2007, and September 6, 2007, containing 28 episodes. The show, produced by Onsen and Animate TV, was hosted by Ayako Kawasumi, who voiced Saber in the anime, and Kana Ueda, who played Rin Tohsaka. A two-disc CD compilation containing the show's first 13 broadcasts was produced on August 24, 2007. The second two-disc CD compilation containing the 14th through 26th broadcasts was released on October 24, 2007.

A second Internet radio show to commemorate the release of the Fate/Stay Night: Unlimited Blade Works film called Feito/Sutei Chūn Museigen Rajio Wākusu (フェイト/ステイ チューン 無制限・ラジオ・ワークス) was broadcast between October 2009 and April 2010, containing 27 episodes. The show was also produced by Onsen and Animate TV. Two two-disc CD compilations were released containing the radio show's broadcasts, with the first being released on March 25, 2010, followed by the second on May 26, 2010.

=== Spin-offs ===
Characters from the Fate/Stay Night visual novel appear alongside other Type-Moon characters in the gag manga series Carnival Phantasm, released by Ichijinsha between July 2004 and 2005. An original video animation series produced by Lerche was released between August 12, 2011, and July 7, 2012.

The Today's Menu for the Emiya Family manga series written and illustrated by TAa, was serialized on Kadokawa Shoten's Young Ace Up website since January 26, 2016, and has since then been collected in twelve tankōbon volumes as of May 2026. Set in an alternate universe where the Fifth Holy Grail War resolved with most of the characters surviving and later becoming friends and neighbors, it revolves around Shiro and other characters preparing various dishes for their friends and family. A thirteen-episode original net animation adaptation by Ufotable aired monthly from January 25, 2018, to January 1, 2019, and a video game was also released for the Nintendo Switch.

In December 2019, the Fate/type Redline manga series began publishing in Type-Moon's Comic Ace web magazine. The series follows a boy that was sent back in time to a Holy Grail War set in Japan during World War II.

== Music ==
The visual novel Fate/Stay Night has three main theme songs, starting with the opening theme "This Illusion", performed by rhu. There are various different ending themes; depending on what route is completed, and the last is the game's final ending theme. The original soundtrack for Fate/Stay Night was released in February 2004, through Geneon Entertainment. An arranged soundtrack, titled Avalon – Fate/Stay Night was organized by WAVE and K. JUNO and featured two English versions of "This Illusion" titled "Illusion/Vision" and "Illusion/Fate". The anime original soundtrack was composed by Kenji Kawai. In addition, there are image albums Wish and White Avalon as well as various remix albums Fate another score, Fate/extended play, and Emiya #0.

Game themes
Title	Composition and arrangement	Lyrics	Performance	Type
"This Illusion"	Number201	Keita Haga	M.H.	Opening theme
"Days"	Number201	Keita Haga	Chino	Ending theme
"Ōgon no Kagayaki" (黄金の輝き; lit. 'Golden Glitter')	Number201	Keita Haga	Maki	Opening theme (Réalta Nua)
"Link"	Number201	Keita Haga	Rhu	Ending theme (Réalta Nua)
"Arcadia"		Rico	Earthmind	Opening theme (Réalta Nua PSV, Fate route)
"Horizon"			Earthmind	Opening theme (Réalta Nua PSV, Unlimited Blade Works route)
"Another Heaven"			Earthmind	Opening theme (Réalta Nua PSV, Heaven's Feel route)

Anime themes
Title	Composition	Arrangement	Lyrics	Performance	Single release date	Type
"Disillusion" (episodes 1–14)	Number201	Kenji Kawai	Keita Haga	Sachi Tainaka	February 22, 2006	Opening theme
"Kirameku Namida wa Hoshi ni" (きらめく涙は星に; lit. 'Glittering Tears Change To Stars') (episodes 15–23)	KATE	Sogawa Tomoji, Number201	Keita Haga	Sachi Tainaka	May 31, 2006	Opening theme
"Anata ga Ita Mori" (あなたがいた森; lit. 'The Forest In Which You Were') (episodes 1–13, 15–23)			Manami Watanabe	Jyukai	March 15, 2006	Ending theme
"Hikari" (ヒカリ; lit. 'Light') (episode 14)			Manami Watanabe	Jyukai		Ending theme
"Kimi to no Ashita" (君との明日; lit. 'Tomorrow with You') (episode 24)	Sachi Tainaka	Kaneko Takahiro	Sachi Tainaka	Sachi Tainaka	February 7, 2007	Ending theme
"Disillusion2010" (OVA)	Number201	Ayumi Miyazaki	Manami Watanabe	Sachi Tainaka	January 22, 2010	Opening theme
"With..." (OVA, Episode 1)	Number201			Jyukai feat. Sachi Tainaka		Ending theme
"Kumo no Kakera" (雲のかけら; lit. 'Fragments of Clouds') (OVA, Episode 2)	Number201	Ayumi Miyazaki	Manami Watanabe	Sachi Tainaka feat. Jyukai		Ending theme

== Reception and sales ==
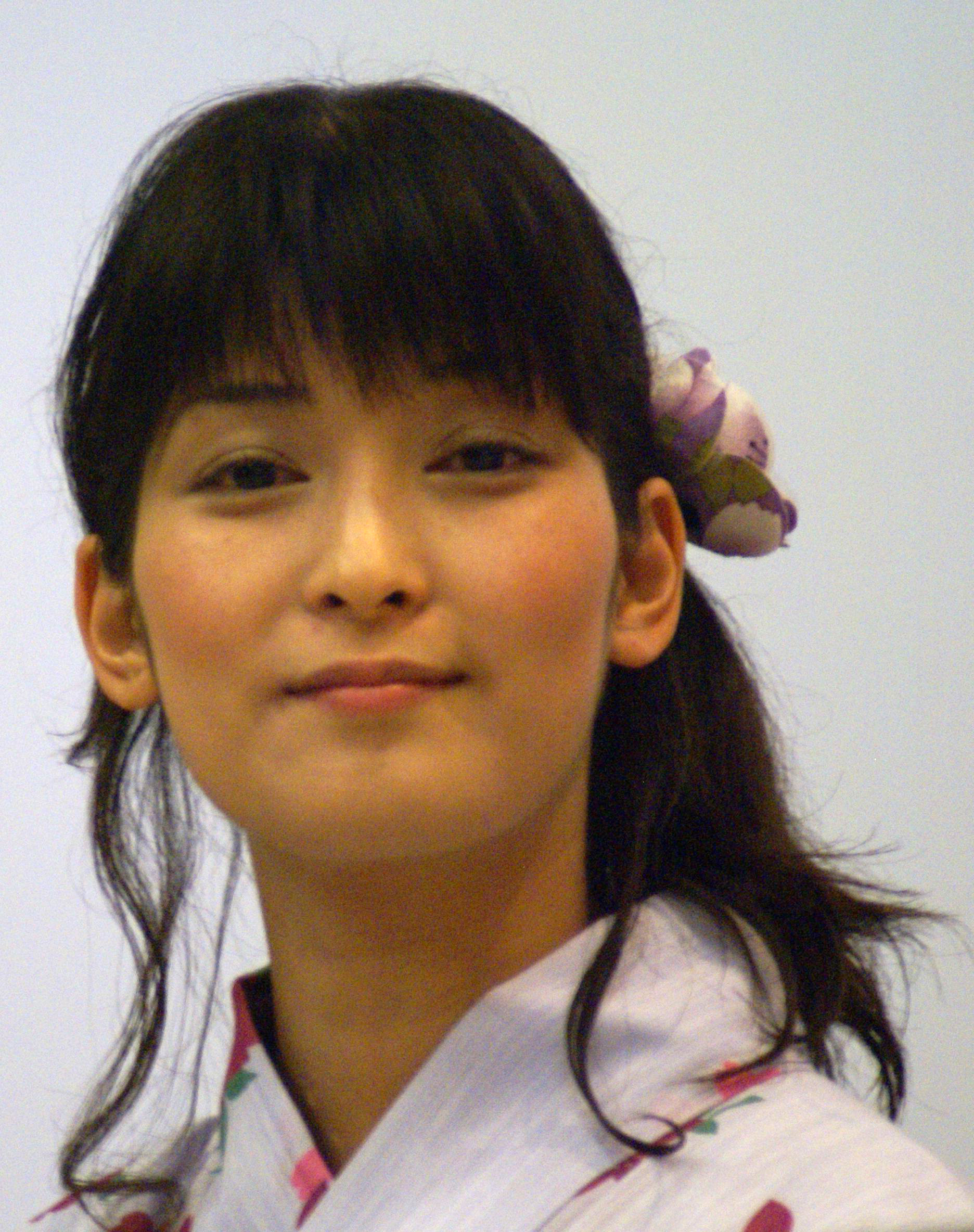
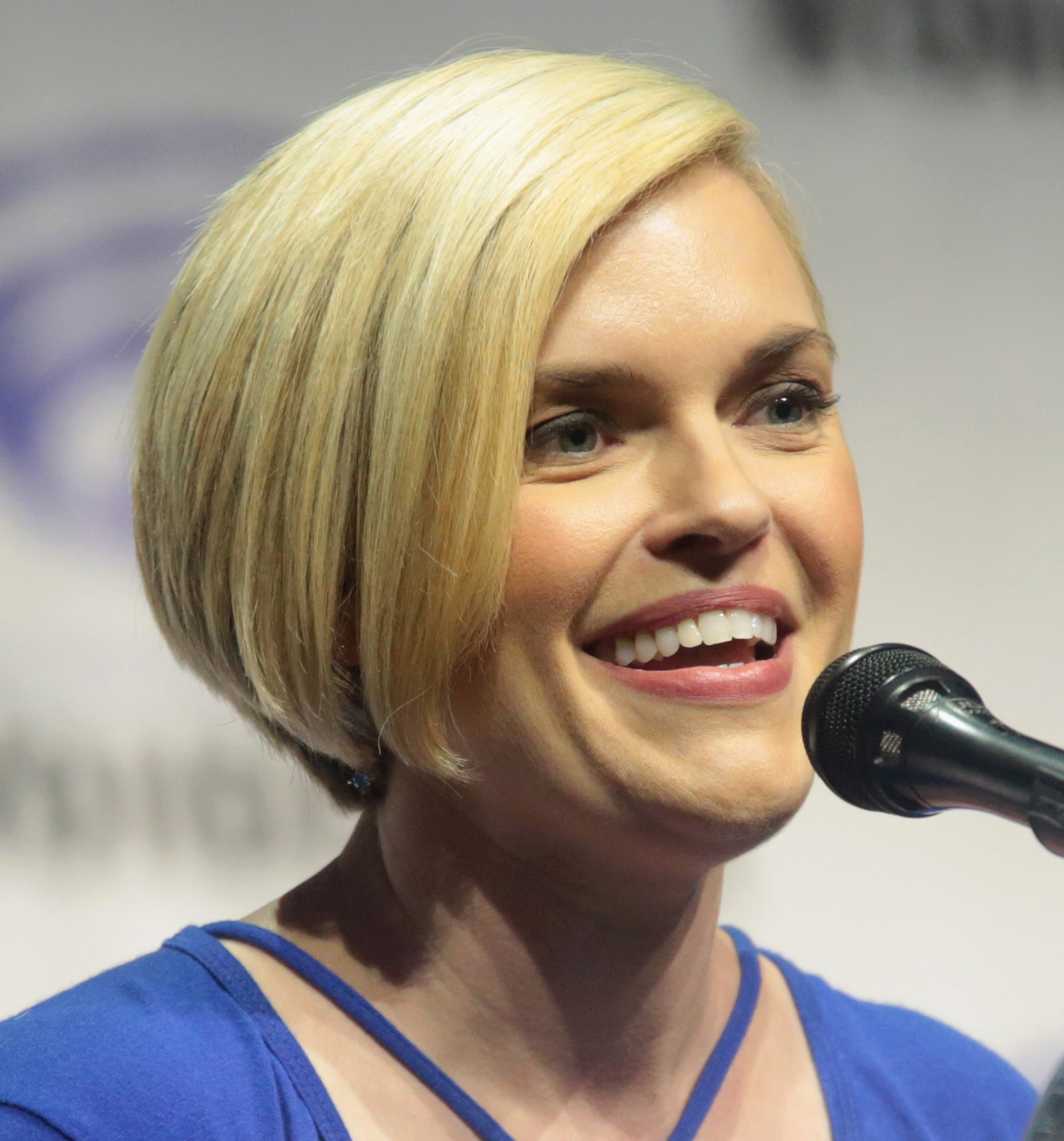
Ayako Kawasumi (left) and Kari Wahlgren (right) voiced Saber in the Japanese and English versions, respectively.

The game was met with critical acclaim. Fate/Stay Night had quickly become one of the most well-known visual novels in history, securing the title of "highest selling visual novel" on the adult game retailer Getchu.com in 2004. Fate/Stay Night was also the highest-selling computer game in the 2005 top 50 best-selling Bishōjo games semi-monthly sales chart in Japan. In the October 2007 issue of Dengeki G's Magazine, poll results for the 50 best bishōjo games were released. Out of 249 titles, Fate/Stay Night ranked second at 78 votes, behind Clannad, with 114 votes. The original PC version of the visual novel sold 400,000 copies. On the PlayStation 2, the 2007 release sold 184,558 and the 2009 re-release sold 21,937. In 2013, the game sold 58,157 on the PlayStation Vita, and 86,836 in 2014. Adding up to total visual novel sales of 751,488 copies. The DVD and Blu-ray releases of the 2006 anime series sold 283,864 units in Japan.

In early 2007, the popularity of Fate/Stay Night and the Japanese voice actors had led to the launch of the Fate/Stay Tune internet radio drama, featuring the voices of Kana Ueda (Rin) and Ayako Kawasumi (Saber). In 2011, the writers Chris Klug and Josiah Lebowitz in their book Interactive Storytelling For Video Games regarded Fate/Stay Night as a "strong" example of branching storylines and interactive storytelling, comparing its depth and complexity to that of a traditional novel. In 2019, the Fate franchise had taken first place during the Comiket 96 event. The spin-off Fate/Grand Order was also a commercial success, grossing over $5 billion, surpassing the video game franchise Metal Gear in four years.

=== Critical response ===
Fate/Stay Night is regarded as one of the most well-known representatives of the visual novel genre. It was described as "among the most well-received visual novels ever published". It was noted that TYPE-MOON's use of heroes from legends of antiquity encouraged acquaintance with their literary and mythological sources.

Uno Tsunehiro from Kyoto University compared Shirou's traumatic background regarding the city's fire to survivors from the September 11 attacks while also showing different ways the Japanese society used to take care of their lives in such times. As a result, Tsunehiro views Shirou's change in each route as a way to recover from the trauma, grow up, and become an independent person. According to Lebowitz and Klug, the chosen format of the visual novel was optimally used since the concept of several plot arcs stretched the exposition of elements important for a common understanding of the plot and supported reader interest. The researchers also identified branchings that contain differently emotionally colored scenes that made it possible to view the situation or characters from several angles. A large number of sudden deaths, coupled with a strong effect of losing control over the situation, according to the authors of the monograph, gave the gameplay an additional emotional coloring and motivated players to continue playing the game, aided by well-developed plot twists. Despite the linearity of the passage of the story arcs, the option of completely skipping the already known scenes "warned players of fatigue and again quickly dipped them into the thick of events". Story twists were called by various observers "relevant and exciting". The darker narrative Heaven's Feel takes in comparison to Fate and Unlimited Blade Works resulted in the route being compared to the horror genre. Rice Digital claimed the adult content was given a deep theme particularly in Heaven's Feel when the heroine, Sakura, is treated differently due to her backstory, which makes her uneasy.

Critics and scholars praised Shirou. Gamasutra's writer Andrew Bossche regarded Shirou as an interesting protagonist due to his childish ideals of becoming a hero and continuing this goal while growing up. Adding that the player's in-game choices make Shirou's character arcs change dramatically and allow Nasu to convey a different aspect of his ideal. The novelist Shūsei Sakagami praised how users can witness Shirou's "gradual change from a robot to becoming a human" through the three routes, developing distinctive traits in each one. In his analysis of the magical system and details of the personalities of the characters, Makoto Kuroda sees in the idea of Shirou to become a "champion of justice" a direct analogy with the traditional view of the life of bodhisattvas in Mahayana Buddhism, seeking to save other people at the cost of their own efforts and suffering. In Kuroda's view, Buddhist concepts are opposed to the elements of faux-Christian ethics contained in the plot through the opposition of Shirou and Kirei Kotomine in the form of the main character's rejection of the interpretation of Angra Mainyu as a creature who accepted and manifests the sins of others in the name of salvation.

Reviewers considered Shirou's behavior and his attitude towards his own ideals as the most interesting and well-developed part of the whole novel. The main character in each of the story arcs was placed in different conditions, which gave readers the opportunity to understand the conditions of the setting (Fate), to conduct a theoretical understanding of the ideals of the character (Unlimited Blade Works), to face the problems of their implementation (Heaven's Feel) and, having combined this, to understand the details of his image. The images of Rin, Saber, and Sakura received conflicting ratings. Many reviewers felt the Heaven's Feel story arc was the "deepest", due to the sharp and versatile disclosure of the image of Sakura Matou, and her romantic line with Shirou is the most "adult" among all the heroines. According to Japanese writer Gen Urobouchi, the relationship between Shirou and Saber resembled the relationship "between a boy and a boy who became a girl" and more "corresponded to the ancient Greek understanding of love". Takashi Takeuchi maintained that in purview of the essential themes concerning the ideal and overcoming self, "the first story [the Fate route] is Fate itself for me."

==== Fate/Stay Night Remastered ====
Reception

Aggregate score
Aggregator	Score
Metacritic	PC: 89/100

Review scores
Publication	Score
RPGFan	86/100
Shacknews	9/10
Digitally Downloaded	5/5

Upon release, Fate/Stay Night Remastered had received generally favorable reviews according to review aggregator Metacritic.

Shacknews' Lucas White felt the updated user interface "beats the heck out of old janky hacked software". While Neal Chandran writing for RPGFan, wrote that the interface was "clunky" and there was inadequate content/trigger warnings. The reviewer felt that it held onto several "2000s trappings" that "may not appeal to contemporary sensibilities". Chandran also noted that the game's alternative scenes had made "contextual sense". Shaun Musgrave from TouchArcade had said Fate/Stay Night Remastered significantly improved the experience of Fate/Stay Night and that it was worth spending the time on. Matt S. of Digitally Downloaded said it had an "advantage" over the original game and featured "worthwhile" voice acting.

== Legacy ==
The Fate/Stay Night visual novel spawned the Fate multi-media franchise, consisting of adaptations and spin-offs in various different media, including light novels, anime and manga. Type-Moon released a sequel video game to Fate/Stay Night, titled Fate/Hollow Ataraxia in October 2005, set half a year after the events of Fate/Stay Night and featured new characters alongside returning characters. In December 2006, a light novel prequel titled Fate/Zero covering the events of the fourth Holy Grail War was released. In 2007, a spin-off magical girl manga series, Fate/kaleid liner Prisma Illya, had begun serialization in Kadokawa Shoten's Comp Ace magazine, and has since then received several anime adaptations. Numerous spin-off video games have also been released, including the fighting games Fate/Tiger Colosseum (2007), its sequel Fate/Tiger Colosseum Upper (2008), and Fate/Unlimited Codes (2008), as well as the RPG Fate/Extra (2010). A gacha game titled Fate/Grand Order was released for mobile platforms in 2015. The game had grossed over $5.6 billion worldwide in July 2021 and was regarded as one of the highest-grossing mobile games of all time.

=== Remakes ===
Fate/Stay Night has been remade twice. The first, Fate/Stay Night Réalta Nua, was released in April 2007 for the PlayStation 2 in Japan. The gameplay was redesigned and its graphics were updated. A port of Réalta Nua was released for the PlayStation Vita on November 29, 2012. A second remake based on Realta Nua titled Fate/Stay Night Remastered was released worldwide for the Nintendo Switch and PC on August 8, 2024.
