= World Embryo =

Japanese manga series

- First tankōbon volume cover

ワールドエンブリオ (Waarudoenburio)
- Genre: Action; Fantasy; Science fiction
- Manga
- Written by: Daisuke Moriyama
- Published by: Shōnen Gahosha
- English publisher: AUS: Madman Entertainment; NA: Dark Horse Comics (unreleased); SG: Chuang Yi
- Imprint: Young King Comics
- Magazine: Young King OURs
- Original run: April 30, 2005 – May 30, 2014
- Volumes: 13
- icon

World Embryo (Japanese: ワールドエンブリオ, Hepburn: Wārudo Enburio) is a Japanese manga series written and illustrated by Daisuke Moriyama. It was serialized by Shōnen Gahosha's seinen manga magazine Young King OURs from April 2005 to May 2014, with its chapters collected in thirteen tankōbon volumes. The story follows a group of humans who combat monstrous creatures that spread around by using cell-phone signals.

== Plot ==
Riku Amami receives a cellphone picture from his deceased stepsister, Amane, showing a local hospital. He investigates and is attacked by electromagnetic monsters called Kanshu, which propagate through cellphone signals; hearing a specific static sound from one's phone leads to a horrific transformation into a Kanshu or a fatal infection. He is saved by two warriors, Rena and Youhei, who wield anti-Kanshu weapons known as Jinki. During the battle, Riku finds a cocoon that hatches a toddler identical to Amane. As the crisis intensifies, Riku acquires his own Jinki and is pulled into the secret organization fighting this threat.

== Characters ==
Riku Amami (天海 陸, Amami Riku)
Voiced by: Junko Minagawa (CD drama)
Riku is a high school student living with his stepmother, Shizuru. After a fatal encounter, the Kanshu Neene saves him by transforming him into a unique Kanshu who retains his consciousness by using a Jinki, a chainsaw-like sword. He dedicates himself to protecting Neene from the organization F.L.A.G. When Neene is captured, Riku disappears, only to later reemerge during a major battle. After vanishing for three months, he is found within a cocoon of light. In his powerful Jinki form, marked by white hair and distinctive markings, he is known online as "Suraga" and is one of the few capable of harming a Kagomari.
Neene (ネーネ)
Voiced by: Chiwa Saito (CD drama)
Neene is a Coffin Princess who resembles Riku's late aunt, Amane. She initially appears as a toddler but ages rapidly through growth spurts triggered by using her powers. Neene possesses abilities such as transforming the mortally wounded into Kanshu and generating a destructive sphere of light. She is a Kyuki, a queen Kanshu who grows by absorbing memories collected by other Kanshu. After being taken by the source of the infection, she seemingly dies protecting Riku at the rubble tower. She reappears three months later as a teenager, having established a hideout. Her current demeanor is affectionate yet vacant, and she commands a black Kanshu that collects cores from fallen Jinki users for her.
Rena Arisugawa (有栖川 レナ, Arisugawa Rena)
Voiced by: Kana Asumi (CD drama)
Rena is a serious and focused Jinki user who wields Shingetsu, a pair of trigger-gripped chakrams. After her partner's death, she teams up with Riku, developing a strong connection with him. Rena is a lost re-bound victim; her mentor vanished during a Kanshu attack that erased all memory of her hometown, Hatsumi Island. She actively searches for Riku and Neene after their disappearance. During a major battle, she confronts a black Kanshu whose fighting style resembles her father's. Rena vanishes alongside Riku for three months following the conflict.
Youhei Takebe (武部 洋平, Takebe Yōhei)
Voiced by: Showtaro Morikubo (CD drama)
Youhei is an optimistic Jinki user and Rena's initial partner. He first befriends Riku during a shared hospital stay. His Jinki is a short blade, a gift from his teacher that saved him from a Kanshu attack. In a similar situation, Youhei gives his Jinki to a mortally wounded Riku. To prevent his own complete transformation into a Kanshu, he requests and receives a beheading from Riku.
Takao / Takao Ryuusei (タカオ / 鷹尾 劉生, Takao / Ryūsei Takao)
Voiced by: Kentaro Ito / Mutsumi Tamura (young) (CD drama)
Takao is a Jinki Hunter and infamous mass murderer who seeks to use Neene's power to defeat the Source of Infection. He augments his own strength by utilizing the cores of Jinki users he has slain, granting him enough power to shatter Cages with a single strike. A highly skilled katana wielder, he remains a formidable combatant even with a crippled hand. He is the master of the Coffin Princess known as Julie.
Shirou Karasawa (唐沢 志郎, Karasawa Shirō)
Voiced by: Toshihiko Seki (CD drama)
Shirou is the mysterious source of the Kanshus and the former director of F.L.A.G. He initially appears to Riku as a man in a kitsune mask, using it to confuse and recruit him. Karasawa promises to help Neene discover her origins and uses her power to awaken the Coffin Princess Ende. He is killed by Kazama, but with his final moments, he manages to plead with Neene to stop the rampaging Ende.
Tougo Kazama (風間 冬梧, Kazama Tōgō)
Tougo is a childhood friend of Riku. He recognizes Riku as Suraga and awakens to a Jinki core while being hunted by Takao. This awakening stems from an incident two months prior when a Jinki core struck him during a fire, leaving a temporary glowing scar. A scratch on his core causes him immense pain and prevents him from materializing a proper blade, leading F.L.A.G. to construct a custom weapon for him. During a major battle, he snipes and kills Shirou Karasawa. He spends the subsequent three months training.

== Publication ==
Written and illustrated by Daisuke Moriyama, World Embryo was serialized in Shōnen Gahōsha's seinen manga magazine Young King OURs from April 30, 2005, to May 30, 2014. Shōnen Gahosha collected its chapters in thirteen tankōbon volumes, released from March 2, 2006, to September 30, 2014.

The series was licensed for an English language release in Singapore by Chuang Yi, in Australia by Madman Entertainment, and in North America by Dark Horse Comics, although the volumes were never published.
