= Chrono Crusade =

Japanese manga series by Daisuke Moriyama

- First tankōbon volume cover, featuring Chrono (left) and Rosette Christopher (right)

クロノ クルセイド (Kurono Kuruseido)
- Genre: Action; Supernatural
- Manga
- Written by: Daisuke Moriyama
- Published by: Fujimi Shobo; Shōnen Gahōsha (second edition)
- English publisher: AUS: Madman Entertainment; NA: ADV Manga
- Imprint: Dragon Comics; Young King Comics (second edition)
- Magazine: Monthly Comic Dragon (1998–2003); Monthly Dragon Age (2003–2004)
- Original run: December 9, 1998 – May 8, 2004
- Volumes: 8
- Anime television series
- Directed by: Yū Kō
- Produced by: Atsuya Takase; Gō Wakamatsu; Shigeaki Tomioka; Tsuneo Takeuchi
- Written by: Atsuhiro Tomioka
- Music by: Hikaru Nanase
- Studio: Gonzo
- Licensed by: Crunchyroll; UK: Anime Limited
- Original network: Fuji TV
- English network: US: Showtime Beyond, Syfy
- Original run: November 24, 2003 – June 10, 2004
- Episodes: 24
- icon

Chrono Crusade (Japanese: クロノクルセイド, Hepburn: Kurono Kuruseido), originally known in Japan (due to a typo) as Chrno Crusade, is a Japanese manga series written and illustrated by Daisuke Moriyama. It was serialized in Fujimi Shobo's Monthly Comic Dragon from 1998 to 2003 and later in Monthly Dragon Age from 2003 to 2004, with its chapters collected in eight tankōbon volumes. It was licensed in North America by ADV Manga.

Set in New York during the 1920s, Chrono Crusade follows the story of Rosette Christopher, and her demon partner Chrono. As members of the Magdalene Order, they travel around the country eliminating demonic threats to society, while Rosette searches for her lost brother, Joshua.

Chrono Crusade was adapted into a 24-episode anime television series, animated by Gonzo and directed by Yū Kō, broadcast on Fuji TV from 2003 to 2004. The anime series was licensed in North America by ADV Films in 2004 and later acquired by Funimation in 2010.

== Plot ==
Chrono Crusade is set in the height of the Roaring Twenties, where jazz is king, bootleg liquor flows freely, and the mob rules the streets. It is a time of prosperity, luxury and decadence, and the division between rich and poor grows even wider in the wake of the First World War. It is at such times of great change and upheaval that the dark things that lurk below the world of man can come to the surface. In the world of Chrono Crusade, a fictional organization known as the Order of Magdalene (home to the characters Sister Rosette Christopher and her soul-bound demon partner, Chrono) exists to fight the demonic threats that appear with increasing regularity across America. Both Rosette and Chrono are revealed during the course of the story to be driven by a shadowy past, centered on a search for Rosette's lost brother Joshua who is shown to have been taken from her by the Sinner, Aion, a demon who shares a dark and bloody history with Chrono. He seeks nothing less than to overthrow the delicate balance between Heaven, Earth, and Hell (in the manga it is the demons' hierarchy he wished to destroy).

The anime follows the manga through the events of Volume IV, but it diverges during a crucial plot event, creating different courses of events and endings. The characterization of some of the characters, including Rosette and Aion, and their roles in the story were changed drastically in the adaptation of the manga. Much of the story is driven by the individual pasts of the main characters and the complex relationships between them.

=== Setting ===
The Order of Magdalene is an organization that banishes devils and demons. The Order has many branches around the country (some that are mentioned/visited include the Boston, Chicago, San Francisco, and Seattle branches); each one is presided over by the Council of the Catholic Church. The New York branch of the Order is headed by Kate Valentine, assisted by Ewan Remington, who lead the fight against the forces of darkness. The Order has many members; however, in times of great crisis, other less generally accepted individuals may be introduced into the Order to help fight the forces of darkness.

They use various weapons, mainly guns, swords, and melee weapons, many of which are developed by the New York branch's own Edward "Elder" Hamilton. The Order's preferred handgun is the Colt 1911, often loaded with Sacreds, standard bullets containing holy water, and Gospels, bullets with alchemy-transformed silver. The Spirit bullet was also developed, but upon test-fire it was found to be too dangerous, using a repressed lower-class demon for its explosive power. Tetragrammaton, a gun with high power against demons with low backlash, is given to Rosette and later used by Chrono. Besides using guns, there are members of the Order with special powers as well, using devices like tomes, violins, or dolls. They also use Angel Capture Fields, specialized barriers that can repel demons, their powers, and other astral based substances, and are set up by creating a rectangular array of cross-shaped stakes in the ground and activating them. The Order also developed the Soul Dive, an experimental system used to dive into souls for direct exorcism. The Order also unveils its flagship, the Metatron, in the final showdown with Pandemonium and Aion.

== Characters ==
=== Main ===
Rosette Christopher (ロゼット・クリストファ, Rosetto Kurisutofa)
Voiced by: Tomoko Kawakami (Japanese); Hilary Haag (English)
Rosette is a 16-year-old elite exorcist of the Order of Magdalene and goes out on missions to destroy deadly spirits and devils. Her primary motivation is to rescue her younger brother Joshua, who has been kidnapped and later brainwashed by Aion. Because of a contract she formed with Chrono when she was 12, her life is slowly ticking away. Despite this, she continues to run towards her goal, confronting every challenge with a headstrong attitude. This conviction inspires others like Chrono and Azmaria to push forward surpassing their own limitations and personal doubt. She is almost entirely unfazed by the future she chose when she made her contract with Chrono, claiming she is still going to be "kicking and screaming 'til the very end". Despite knowing exactly who and what Chrono is, she does not seem the least bit afraid of him and trusts him indefinitely as her partner. Rosette is somewhat simple and prone to impulsive behavior that gets her in trouble; she claims it is because she knows she is short on time and can not afford to hesitate on things she may never live to do again and later regret.
Chrono (クロノ, Kurono)
Voiced by: Akira Ishida, Minami Takayama (child) (Japanese); Greg Ayres (English)
Rosette's contractor, partner, and closest friend. Chrono is stoic, loyal, kind, and somewhat quiet. This mild facade of a young boy belies a fierce, full-grown demon of infamous power and utmost rage. His contract with Rosette allows him to exist without his set of horns, which were ripped from his head in an early battle with Aion prior to the initial storyline. Demons' horns allow them to absorb astral energy, which bestows both power and life. In order to maintain Rosette's remaining life force and prevent Chrono's subconscious from stealing the rest, her life's energy is kept sealed in a pocket watch that is worn around her neck, the creator of which is none other than the Sinner named Shader.
Despite being a demon, Chrono cherishes life and those he loves. This creates conflict whenever Rosette is required to unseal her pocket watch, allowing him to harness his immense power to defeat powerful foes or rescue them in desperate situations. Chrono will always try to persuade Rosette to think of other solutions as releasing the pocket watch not only creates pain in his partner, but also lowers her already shortened lifespan.
Whenever his powers are sealed, Chrono retains the form of a young boy who appears extremely docile and rather charming, often surprising the humans he is familiar with. Although considered a "reformed" demon, Chrono has quite the temper, and if provoked will go into a terrifying rage that blinds him from most everything around him, including the people he cares about. Despite this, Chrono is deathly afraid of hurting others, or of being unable to protect those most important to him. His shadowy past with Aion and the Order's namesake Mary Magdalene is what motivates him to accept Rosette's contract despite the pain she will suffer and the end that he sees ahead.
Azmaria Hendrich (アズマリア・ヘンドリック, Azumaria Hendorikku)
Voiced by: Saeko Chiba (Japanese); Jessica Boone (English)
The Apostle of Charity and Songstress of Vegas. Azmaria is a 12-year-old girl with the gift of healing with song. Sensitive and fearful, Azmaria is initially more of a liability to Rosette and Chrono than she is an asset. She was traded among families like a trophy for most of her life, so her self-confidence and feeling of self-worth is extremely low. She has a spectacular soprano singing voice, and as such began her young life singing with a Portuguese orchestra, but when it was discovered that her singing voice had healing powers and marked her as an Apostle, she became an object of pursuit. After rescuing her as part of the Order's roundup of the Apostles, Rosette and Chrono soon make it their personal mission to help Azmaria to value herself just as much as she does others. She is hardworking, diligent, and very eager, and idolizes Rosette as an older sister and mentor.
Being an apostle, although bestowed with immense power, Azmaria is also afflicted with a curse, the curse of misfortune. While Joshua is plagued with poor health, those who come into contact with Azmaria will meet misfortune and suffering.
Satella Harvenheit (サテラ・ハーベンハイト, Satera Hābenhaito)
Voiced by: Michiko Neya (Japanese); Tiffany Grant (English)
A German jewel summoner and bounty hunter who specializes in demons. Her entire family was wiped out by a hornless demon, leaving only herself and her older sister Florette (AKA Fiore) alive. She was then raised by her kind butler Steiner, who still remains by her side. She is now on the search for her sister, who was taken from the massacre by the demon. At first she feels uncomfortable around Rosette and the others due to their trust of Chrono, a hornless devil she thought was the one responsible for her suffering. This changed after spending time with them. She comes to recognize them as friends and worthy comrades in battle.
Although highly irritated at Azmaria for her clumsy ways, Satella truly cares for her, as she sees a part of her former self in her when she was younger. After hearing Azmaria's soprano voice, she is proud of the young apostle and states that there are good points to her after all. Satella firmly believes that to move forward and grow, one must identify weaknesses first.
Although never stated, Satella's connections with demons may run deeper than she thought. In Fiore's memories, Aion came to their home to enlist the help of their father, who Aion states was their elder and teacher. With his refusal, the family home was razed and the family killed. From this, it is possible to assume that both Satella and Fiore may be part demon.

=== Magdalene Order ===
Sister Kate Valentine (ケイト・ヴァレンタイン, Keito Barentain)
Voiced by: Yoshiko Sakakibara (Japanese); Laura Chapman (English)
Head of the New York Branch of the Magdalene Order. She is a strong-willed woman who often seems out of place fighting demons and devils. She leads the order with an iron resolve, making sure the New York Branch Office runs as smooth as clockwork. She also distrusts Chrono despite his gentle nature, due to his status as a demon. She is openly irritated with Rosette due to her aloof ways, but deep down, she truly cares for her.
Sister Kate is later demoted when Chrono loses his sanity and openly attacks Viede and Aion in San Francisco causing countless casualties and revealing to the public the presence of demons.
Father Ewan Remington (ユアン・レミントン, Yuwan Reminton)
Voiced by: Sho Hayami (Japanese); Jason Douglas (English)
The minister of the Magdalene Order. He also serves as a field agent and second in command to Sister Kate. In the anime, towards the end, he leaves the Order. He is seen quite a while later, looking about the same age but unshaven, when the third Prophecy of Fátima happens, just before seeing someone who appears similar to—if not the same as—Aion. He also has the apparent ability to warp, moving from the Magdalene NY HQ to a carnival in San Francisco instantly without anyone's notice. Immediately afterward, during the phone conversation with Sister Kate, he states that he is an Angel, and is implied to be a "fallen" one. It is later revealed that he has history with Chrono, as he was the boy who failed to save Mary Magdalene from being kidnapped by Chrono. It is revealed that he suffered an injury that would have ended his duty in the Order, but volunteered to be infused with Legion (a devil's equivalent to cells) in order to continue his work. After the events of the story, he retires but continues his duty as a father of the Catholic Church.
Edward "Elder" Hamilton (エドワード・ハミルトン, Edowādo Hamiruton)
Voiced by: Tomomichi Nishimura (Japanese); John Swasey (English)
Edward is the person who makes the weapons used by the exorcists. He also has a great love for women, flipping the habits of the Sisters of the Order and playing perverted pranks on them. Despite this, he greatly cares for all the girls. Although he appears aloof and whimsical, Elder can display great authority and leadership, spurring those around him, including Sister Kate, into action.
Elder was previously involved with Mary Magdalene. He was the first one who accompanied Mary from the orphanage and explained her powers to her. He later accompanies the young Ewan in their pursuit of Chrono who kidnapped her from the Order.
Sister Anna (アンナ, Anna)
Voiced by: Yuki Masuda (Japanese); Mandy Clark (1–15), Brittney Karbowski (16–24) (English)
Sister Claire (クレア, Kurea)
Voiced by: Noriko Rikimaru (Japanese); Sasha Paysinger (English)
Sister Mary (メアリ, Meari)
Voiced by: Ema Kogure (Japanese); Michelle Maulsby (English)
Mary Magdalene (メアリー・マグダレーナ, Mearī Magudarēna)
Voiced by: Tomoko Kawakami (Japanese); Hilary Haag (English)
Mary is the foreseeing Holy Maiden after whom the Order was named. Having spent most of her life inside the Order, she was more than willing to follow Chrono to the outside world. She became close friends with the Sinners, notably with Chrono, who is implied to have developed feelings for her. She was killed by Aion, who was controlled by Pandemonium, and mourned by Chrono, who then left the Sinners.

=== Pursuers ===
The Pursuers are demons sent by the elders of Pandemonium to eradicate the defected Sinners. The strength of their demons varies from weak to powerful, with numbers many times over those of the Sinners.

Duke Duffau (公爵デュフォー, Kōshaku Deyufō)
Voiced by: Norio Wakamoto (Japanese); Rob Mungle (English)
The leader of his own army. In the anime, he allied with the Magdalene Order to fight against the Sinners and managed to eliminate Genai. He led his troops in an attack on Aion, but was slain along with the rest when sprayed with Rosette's blood. Duke Duffau led the assault on Eden and fought well against Aion with his bare hands. He ultimately falls when a geas is cast on all demons worldwide leaving him immobile and open to execution by Aion who has ripped out his own horns to escape the geas.
Carv (カルヴ, Karuvu)
Voiced by: Takayasu Usui
One of the members of Duke Duffau's army. He was killed along with his enemy Viede (one of Aion's Sinners).
Gurio (グーリオ, Gūrio)
Voiced by: Masayuki Nakata (Japanese); Victor Carsrud (English)
One of the members of Duke Duffau's army. He followed Duffau on the attack against Aion but was wounded by Rosette's holy blood. He managed to escape and went back to Chrono to warn him about Rosette, but died of wounds soon after.

=== Sinners ===
Sinners are demons who have separated themselves from the demon hive Pandemonium and openly rebelled. In the case of the story, after Aion reached a higher domain and acquired forbidden knowledge, he was classified as a Sinner, with both him and his brood marked for execution. As a result, he becomes the de facto leader of this group, who eventually fight their way to freedom on Eden, although many comrades were lost. Of the Sinners, only Joshua and Fiore are not demons.

Aion (アイオーン, Aiōn)
Voiced by: Kazuhiko Inoue (Japanese); Andy McAvin (English)
A Sinner and a demon, and also Chrono's twin older brother. He is after all of the Apostles, including Azmaria, for reasons that are unknown until Chrono reveals them. His goal is to rebuild the world out of the "system" that binds everyone to their respective roles. Aion is very intelligent and manipulative while still remaining charismatic to those around him. He is fighting "Pandemonium", the system that maintains the roles that each of his siblings must take. If they were to ever reach a higher domain like himself, they will have learned too much and are disposed of.
Joshua Christopher (ヨシュア・クリストファ, Yoshua Kurisutofa)
Voiced by: Junko Minagawa (Japanese); Chris Patton (English)
He holds allegiance to Aion's Sinners, and is also the Apostle of Hope and Rosette's younger brother. He is able to freeze people's time with the use of Chrono's devil horns, granted to him by Aion. He was tricked into taking Chrono's horns and followed Aion because he did not want Rosette to have to take care of him all the time. He wanted to be strong enough to take care of her and be her support.
Like Azmaria, Joshua was afflicted with the curse of ill health and suffering. Although he could heal the wounds of others, he could never alleviate his own suffering and is usually confined to a bed. He took Chrono's horns so that he could be stronger and fulfill his promise to become an explorer with his sister.
Both Joshua and Rosette were left orphaned when their parents went missing after their ship sank. He knows that the grave stone they attend is not real as their parents' bodies were never found. As a result, he pledged never to grow old as adults lie and hurt others.
Florette/Fiore Harvenheit (フィオレ/フロレット・ハーベンハイト, Fiore/Furoretto Hābenhaito)
Voiced by: Natsuko Kuwatani (Japanese); Monica Rial (English)
Fiore is a very powerful jewel summoner who is Joshua's caretaker/maid (whom he refers to as "older sister"). When she was younger, she was taken by Aion, who erased her memory. Aion replaced her memories of Satella with memories of Joshua, which in turn makes her think that Joshua is her brother. She is completely devoted to Aion and Joshua, vowing to always protect Joshua no matter what. Later, when she encountered her sister Satella, she had no idea who she was. However, in the manga, she retained her memories and insisted that her existence as "Florette" ceased the day she died. In her fight with Satella, it is revealed that she is a mannequin and could reattach any limbs which were severed.
Fiore makes the gems that the Sinners wear, allowing them to fight without their horns.
Rizelle (リゼール, Rizēru)
Voiced by: Yōko Sōmi (Japanese); Christine Auten (English)
A spider-like Sinner who sends out miniature spiders who latch onto the necks of her victims, allowing her to control them like marionettes. All she desires is to be helpful to Aion. She is one of the six members of Aion's team and the first one to be killed. Her waist was slashed by Pandemonium's claws killing off the legion that reside there. As a result, she forever lost the lower half of her body, which is now replaced by metal legs much like a spider's.
Her death in the anime is slightly different from the one in the manga. In the anime, she vanished when she fell off the train, screaming all the way. In the manga, the upper half of her body is shown floating away in the stream beneath the bridge. Chrono contacts her through one of her spiders and she laments, wishing he had never left. She mocks Rosette one last time before she quietly dies, drifting away.
Shader (シェーダ, Shēda)
Voiced by: Yuko Sasamoto (Japanese); Kira Vincent-Davis (English)
She is one of the six members of Aion's team. She has animal-like features, with both cat ears and tail, and also displays cat-like behavior like enjoying a nice pat/rub and favoring fish as her food. Shader is the one that invented the devices Chrono and Aion have to absorb astral energy, since they no longer have horns to absorb energy from the Astral Line. She is the fourth to be killed by Remington. In the manga she survives the events of the main story and continues to live in modern America with Fiore.
Viede (ヴィド, Vuidō)
Voiced by: Masafumi Kimura (Japanese); George Manley (English)
He is one of the six members of Aion's team and the second to be killed along with his enemy Carv. A massive hulk, Viede is normally paired off with Genai on missions and as defense. His quiet and thoughtful manner is in stark contrast to Genai's outbursts and irrational behavior. Although he was injured fighting Pandemonium, he was only affected by the force field she threw up rather than the claws she slashed with and was able to make a full recovery. In the manga, he dies defending Eden against the Order and Pandemonium's pursuers.
Genai (ジェナイ, Jenai)
Voiced by: Kouichi Toochika (Japanese); Jay Hickman (English)
He is one of the six members of Aion's team. He wanted to avenge Rizelle after learning that she had been killed. He is the third to be killed by Duke Duffau. In the manga, he displayed fondness to Rizelle and was greatly angered at her death, to the point that he challenged Aion.
Genai's left arm and eyes were slashed by Pandemonium's claws and as such the legion that reside there have died off. Aion had Shader construct metal appendages to replace the deadened limbs. Genai wears a mask that covers his eyes, which themselves appear sewn shut. He slowly dies after the battle on Eden against the pursuers and the Order. As he dies, he reaches his arm towards the sky, saying how beautiful the sky is, wondering whether Rizelle could see them too.

== Production ==
In an interview with ADV Manga, the original manga author Daisuke Moriyama expressed his own opinion about the differences and similarities of the anime and manga, with one of them being the theme of the story. Although the bond between Chrono and Rosette and the idea of time running out were the same, Moriyama felt that the anime and manga showed this theme in different ways. While the anime centered more on the currents of time, fate and trust, Moriyama believed that the manga focused more on Rosette's individual ideology and how the potential strength of her will can change her current situation.

In producing the English-language version, ADV did extensive research in keeping the slang words within 1920s canon. One word, "bimbo", is explained to mean a tough man in 1920s slang, while the modern version refers to a stupid woman. The English voice actors for Rosette and Chrono (Hilary Haag and Greg Ayres) nearly lost their voices on numerous occasions due to the fast-paced voice work demanded by the anime.

== Media ==
=== Manga ===
Written and illustrated by Daisuke Moriyama, Chrono Crusade started in Fujimi Shobo's Monthly Comic Dragon on December 9, 1998. (Note: The series debuted in the magazine's January 1999 issue, released on December 9, 1998.) The series later continued in Monthly Dragon Age from April 9, 2003, and finished on May 8, 2004. Its individual chapters were collected in eight tankōbon volumes, released between November 30, 1999, and September 1, 2004. Shōnen Gahōsha republished the series in a new eight-volume edition under its Young King Comics imprint from January 8 to April 9, 2010; in this edition, the title Chrno Crusade (in Latin script), which appeared in the original edition, was corrected, appearing as Chrono Crusade.

The series was licensed for English release in North America by ADV Manga. The eight volumes were released from 2004 to 2006. Some of the series' chapters were featured in the Newtype USA magazine. In Australia and New Zealanda, Madman Entertainment released the eight volumes from 2005 to 2006.

=== Anime ===
A 24-episode anime television series adaptation, animated by Gonzo, was broadcast on Fuji TV from November 25 to June 10, 2004. The series was directed by Yū Kō, with Atsuhiro Tomioka writing series scripts, Kazuya Kuroda designing the characters, Tomohiro Kawahara handling mechanical design, Hisao Muramatsu in charge of gun design and Masumi Itō composing the music.

The series was first licensed in North America by ADV Films, who announced its acquisition in 2003. The episodes were collected on seven DVDs released from September 21, 2004, to August 1, 2005. In the United States, the series was broadcast on Showtime Beyond from February 17 to July 28, 2006. The series was re-licensed by Funimation (later Crunchyroll), who announced its acquisition in 2010; the entire series was released on a single DVD set on February 22, 2011. It was also broadcast on SyFy in 2011.

=== Drama CDs ===
Several drama CDs based on the series have been released:

- Chrono Crusade: The Contractor of the Beginning (クロノクルセイド I -始まりの契約者-, Chrono Crusade: Hajimari no Keiyakusha) (December 1, 2000; Marine Entertainment)
- Chrono Crusade II: The Time of Eternity (クロノクルセイド II -永遠の時間-, Chrono Crusade II: Eien no Jikan) (July 25, 2001; Marine Entertainment)
- Chrono Crusade III: The Time of the Beginning (クロノクルセイド III -始まりの時間-, Chrono Crusade III: Hajimari no Jikan) (November 28, 2001; Marine Entertainment)
- Chrono Crusade Original Drama Spirit (クロノクルセイド オリジナルドラマ～Spirit) (April 21, 2004; Lantis)
- Chrono Crusade Original Drama CD: Predecessor Version (クロノクルセイド Original Drama CD ～先行版～, Kurono Kuruseido Original Drama CD -Senkō-ban-) (July 23, 2004; Happinet Pictures)
- Chrono Crusade Original Drama CD: Ghost in the Watch (クロノクルセイド Original Drama CD -GHOST IN THE WATCH-) (August 27, 2004; Happinet Pictures)
- Chrono Crusade Original Drama CD: The Messenger of Joshua (クロノクルセイド Original Drama CD「ヨシュアのおつかい」, Kurono Kuruseido Original Drama CD -Yoshua no Otsukai-) (September 24, 2004; Happinet Pictures)
- Chrono Crusade: Magdala Girls' Academy vs. Pandemonium Academy Part 1 (クロノクルセイド マグダラ女子学園VSパンデモニウム学園 前編, Kurono Kuruseido Magudara Joshi Gakuen VS Pandemoniumu Gakuen Zenpen) (October 22, 2006; Happinet Pictures)
- Chrono Crusade Magdala Girls' Academy VS Pandemonium Academy Part 2 (クロノクルセイド マグダラ女子学園VSパンデモニウム学園 後編, Kurono Kuruseido Magudara Joshi Gakuen VS Pandemoniumu Gakuen Kōhen) (November 26, 2006; Happinet Pictures)

=== Novel ===
A light novel adaptation, Chrono Crusade: Wings, They are the Light of the Soul (クロノクルセイド: 翼よ、あれが魂の灯だ, Kurono Kuruseido: Tsubasa Yo, Are Ga Tamashii no Akari Da), was published by Fujimi Shobo on April 20, 2004. Written by Hiroshi Tominaga and illustrated by Hiroshi Miyazawa, the novel is an original side story for the series, in which Sister Rosette and Chrono investigate strange events in St. Louis.

=== Miscellaneous ===
A guide book Chrono Crusade Super Guide (クロノクルセイド スーパーガイド, Kurono Kuruseido Sūpā Gaido), was published by Fujimi Shobo on January 30, 2004.

== See also ==
- Girls with guns
- Nunsploitation
