= Daisuke Moriyama =

Japanese manga artist (born 1971)

- Born: September 11, 1971 (age 54); Sukumo, Kōchi, Japan
- Occupation: Manga artist
- Known for: Chrono Crusade

Daisuke Moriyama (Japanese: 森山大輔, Hepburn: Moriyama Daisuke; born September 11, 1971) is a Japanese manga artist best known for creating the Chrono Crusade series which was adapted into a 24 episodes anime series by the studio Gonzo. Moriyama worked on a series called World Embryo, which was serialized in the Young King OURs magazine from 2005 to 2014.

== List of works ==
- Chrono Crusade (1999–2004, serialized in Dragon Age, Kadokawa Shoten)
- Koko ni Iru Suiren (2002, short stories collection, Kadokawa Shoten)
- Planet Blue (2005, one-shot published in Champion Red, Akita Shoten)
- World Embryo (2005–2014, serialized in Young King OURs, Shōnen Gahōsha)
- Mahou Ineko to Ibarahime (2008, a Yuri one-shot published in Dengeki Daioh, ASCII Media Works. It was revived as short serialization in Dengeki Comic Next, as of 2015).
- Mousou Kikou (2010–2011, serialized in Dengeki Daioh Genesis, ASCII Media Works)
- Thou Shalt Not Die (2014–2020, written by Yoko Taro, serialized in Monthly Big Gangan, Square Enix)
- Fate/stay night Unlimited Blade Works (2021–present, serialized in Dengeki Daioh)

== Video games ==
- Alice in Cyberland (1996).
