= Manga Bible =

Manga Bible may refer to:

- The Manga Bible: From Genesis to Revelation, an English-language manga adaptation of the Bible created by Siku
- Manga Bible (series), a six volume manga series based on the Bible
