= Locke the Superman =

Japanese manga series

- Japanese poster for the film

超人ロック (Chōjin Rokku)
- Manga

Locke
- Written by: Yuki Hijiri
- Published by: SG Planning
- Original run: 1967 – 1971
- Volumes: 5
- Manga

New World Command
- Written by: Yuki Hijiri
- Published by: SG Planning
- Original run: 1977 – 1978
- Volumes: 1
- Manga

Shōnen Gahōsha series
- Written by: Yuki Hijiri
- Published by: Shōnen Gahōsha
- Magazine: Shōnen King (1979−1988); Young King OURs (2004–2022)
- Original run: 1979 – 2022
- Volumes: 68
- Manga

Media Factory series
- Written by: Yuki Hijiri
- Published by: Media Factory
- Magazine: Monthly OUT (1991−1995); Monthly Megu (1995−1999); Monthly Comic Flapper (1999−2022)
- Original run: 1991 – 2022
- Volumes: 45
- Anime film

Witch Era
- Directed by: Hiroshi Fukutomi
- Written by: Atsushi Yamatoya
- Music by: Goro Awami
- Studio: Nippon Animation
- Licensed by: NA: Celebrity Home Entertainment (1st) Central Park Media (2nd) Discotek Media (3rd) Sentai Filmworks (current)
- Released: April 14, 1984
- Runtime: 120 minutes
- Original video animation

Lord Leon
- Directed by: Noboru Ishiguro
- Written by: Takeshi Hirota
- Music by: Keiju Ishikawa
- Studio: Nippon Animation
- Released: October 25, 1989 – December 16, 1989
- Runtime: 30 minutes (each)
- Episodes: 3
- Original video animation

New World Command
- Directed by: Takeshi Hirota
- Written by: Takeshi Hirota
- Music by: Tomoki Hasegawa
- Studio: Nippon Animation
- Released: August 21, 1991 – October 23, 1991
- Runtime: 50 minutes (each)
- Episodes: 2
- Original video animation

Mirror Ring
- Directed by: Yusaku Saotome
- Written by: Katsuhiko Koide
- Music by: Masafumi Hayashi
- Studio: PPM
- Released: December 22, 2000
- Runtime: 65 minutes

Locke the Superman (超人ロック, Chōjin Rokku) is a Japanese manga series created by Yuki Hijiri, which was later adapted into a movie and three OVA releases. The movie was given an obscure video release in the United States by Celebrity Home Entertainment as Locke the Superpower, which was rather heavily edited to 92 minutes, removing violence, nudity and any adult bits. Both it and the OVAs were later licensed and released by Central Park Media under the original name. Ten volumes were published in Poland under the title Locke Superczłowiek. In Australia and the UK the movie and the Lord Leon OVAs were licensed by Manga Entertainment for release in 1997, but both were quietly dropped from the release schedule due to financial issues facing the UK branch.

As of 2012, Discotek has licensed the original Locke the Superman film from 1984 and it was released on November 6. This is the first ever DVD release in the U.S. It was from the uncut, remastered, anamorphic telecine print used for the Japanese DVD release. Discotek provided both the Japanese audio with English subtitles and the original English dub from the 80s, which was previously released on VHS.

In November 2020, the original Locke the Superman film from 1984 was released on Blu-ray by Sentai Filmworks.

== Plot ==
The chronicles of the space age written through a certain immortal psionic's activity.

== Characters ==
=== Main characters ===
Locke
A quiet, charismatic, lonely immortal esper about whom little is known. He is called "Locke the Superman," but often denies being such. It is not known where or when he was born, and if asked, Locke will say he does not remember; it is entirely possible this is true. When he asked by Cornelia Prim in Millennium of the Witch which star he was from, he replied "Toa." However, that was just the name of the planet where he'd lived before that meeting.
He has appeared at various times throughout the history of the galaxy, as a direct influence, an indirect influence, or a simple observer. Using his esper abilities, Locke can learn and do most things more quickly than a normal human. His power also allows him to remain eternally young, or even turn himself into a child again to be adopted by kindhearted families. This is called waka-gaeri; it could be said of this that it keeps him young at heart. It is speculated that he retains a youthful appearance as an excuse not to take responsibility for whatever cause he is approached for, since no one expects the young to accept such responsibilities.
Locke is capable of teleportation over a range of distances, including light years; telekinesis; psychogenesis, the rapid healing of himself and others; short and long range telepathy; and creating barriers and spears of energy.
Liza/Eliza
A form into which Locke can transform. She is a skilled woman, but is only mentioned in certain stories. Once Locke used this identity to become a pop star.

=== The Christian era ===
==== 2000s ====
王志明 (Wang Zhi Ming)
A scanner (espers were called so in those days), a master of qigong sent as an agent from Country C.
Captain Tatjana Klochkov
A Russian scanner.
Kate Ronwall
A research fellow of Sky Lift which developed the space elevator.

=== The Universal era ===
==== The first year ====
Irina Markelov/Malkove
One of the world's most eminent scanners in the A.D. era of the 2500s. She belonged to the secret intelligence agency of the EU.
Dr. Kent Ronwall
An executive director of the space development public corporation. He was a planner of The Infinite Project.

==== The Allies of the Solar System age ====
Machiko Grace
A cyber developer who assists Locke. She's a genius scientist belonging to the technical development office of the Allied Forces of the Solar System. She's an adopted daughter of the Godeauxs family, a prestigious clan, and takes charge of only gifted children who hunger for fame. Locke is her brother-in-law. She appears in Cyber Genocide.
Pederson
An aide of the Allied Forces of the Solar System (the Earth Union Forces). He backs up the research of Machiko Grace. Appears in Cyber Genocide.
Lemus
A brain of the fetuses Machiko illegality obtained and used for the cyber experiment. He loves Machiko dearly and believes that she will create a body for him eventually. Since Locke feels pity for him, he drags Julius into the affair and makes the cyber-body for him secretly away from Machiko. Appears in Cyber Genocide.
Julius Flay
A computer engineer who worked as Miss Grace's assistant. After that, he was one of the immigrants who colonized the planet Ronwal. He later became the leader of the independence movement and met Locke again eighteen years later. Not long afterward, he gained victory through exploiting Locke's efforts and is inaugurated as the first chairman of Ronwall revolutionary council, but he is assassinated soon by the earth union government. He appears in Cyber Genocide, Ronwall no Arashi and Fuyu no Wakusei.
Governor Santos
The governor of Ronwall. He was always at a loss as to what to do about the independence movement. He appears in Ronwal no Arashi.
Elaine Bernstein
A core member of the Ronwal revolutionary army. She plunged into the independence movement and worked frequently with Locke. She is the only person who knows that Locke is Esper except Julius. She appears in Ronwal no Arashi and Fuyu no Wakusei.
Colonel Viktor von Stroheim
A commander of the special airborne forces "Helldiver" of the Earth Union Forces. He was given the nickname "Stroheim, the God of Death" because he was so feared. He was dispatched from Earth and put in charge of the guerrilla independence movement suppression effort on Ronwal.
Alfred Klaus
The chairman of Ronwall revolutionary council. He was appointed as a successor to Julius Flay following his death. Used by the alliance to purge those of the same mind. He appears in Fuyu no Wakusei.
Wilhelm Katō
A commander of the Earth Union Forces. He was dispatched to Ronwal from the earth as a negotiator with Chairman Klaus. He lent the hand to Klaus as a duty, but felt strong indignation against it. He appears in Fuyu no Wakusei.

==== The Galaxy Federation age ====
Erika
The ancestor of the supermen and the true character of Emperor Layzák. Challenged the forces of Earth which were in control of the colonization of the planet Dinard. Locke learned his teleportation ability from Erika. While her name sometimes appears in the anime as "Erīka", it is always written "Erika" in the manga. She appears in Cosmic Game.
Wallenstein
Colonel in the Earth Forces. He quickly noticed the espers after meeting Locke at the battle on Dinard. He kept a close eye on Locke afterwards. Wallenstein became the director of the military intelligence. He appears in Cosmic Game, Honō no Tora and Witch Era.
Lianna Migault
A daughter of General Migault of the Galaxy Federal Army at the Dinard War. She met Locke as he wandered around with a child's appearance (due to his ability to increase or decrease his physical age) and took care of him. She died from the sequela of the radioactive exposure following the indiscriminate nuclear bombing of her planet by Erika. She appears in Cosmic Game.
2nd Lt. Marian Lluis
An intelligence officer of the Federal Army. Since she was a look-alike to Lianna Migault, she was assigned the mission to supervise Locke by Wallenstein. She appears in Honō no Tora.
Amazona
An esper and captain of the space pirate ship Tiger of the Flames. She got engaged to Eric G. Russell as a mercenary, and later assassinated the late feudal lord of the planet Maia. However, all her subordinates were annihilated by Noor.
The Duke of Zenon Noor
A feudal lord of the planet Maia. He murdered his uncle who was the late Duke of Zenon and took the position.
Wolff
A commander of the mercenary troops known as the "Dark Knights". They were employed briefly by Noor.
Eric G. Russell
A general manager of Universe Plastic. He conspired with Noor to acquire crude oil mining rights for Maia.
Lady Kahn
A leader of the Kahn financial combine. She used espers faithful to her as a tool and aimed to build a kingdom, "Millennium", for herself. Locke opposed her army of 200 espers in the events of Millenium of the Witch.
Ryū Yamaki
The youngest director general of the Intelligence Agency of the Galaxy Federal Army. He is the successor to Wallenstein.
Jessica Olin/Amelia
A special esper with the ability to nullify supernatural power. She was brainwashed by Lady Kahn into hating Locke in order to assassinate him.
Cornelia Prim
A subordinate of lady Kahn and a fighter of the Millennium's esper army. She trained Jessica and leads the Esper legion later.
Lugh
A bishop of the "Holy Mothers" who served Lady Kahn in Asteroid Kahn, the stronghold of the Millennium. She attempts to revive the Millennium at planet Alma later.
Ken Yamaki and Haruna Yamaki
Ryu Yamaki and Jessica's children. They are a twin brother and sister. They only had a small amount of ESP.
"The Twilight Warrior"
A space pirate whose real name is unknown.
Haruki Fujishima
A self-styled genius scientist.
Albert Carian
An official of the Intelligence Agency of the Galaxy Federal Army.
Lord Leon
A cyber-type esper and a captain of the space pirate crew "Load Leon". He burns with the desire for revenge against Great Jorg who murdered his parents and damaged both his hands and legs. Jorg even blinded Leon's sister, Flora.
Flora Lane
An elementary school teacher and Leon's younger sister. She is blind after being shot in the eyes. She grew up with her elder brother in a nursing institution.
"Great Jorg" (Jorg Roto)
The chairman of the interplanet enterprise Asturius Konzern. He once planned to murder the Lane family in order to get a Rondit mine of his own.
Doc
An unlicensed doctor who was deprived of his medical qualification by an involuntary manslaughter that resulted from a patient dying during an illegal cyber-operation. Then he worked in a mine belonging to the father of Leon and Flora. After saving the children, Doc continued the maintenance of the cyber parts of Leon afterwards. He was opposed to Leon's revenge.
Elena/Neon
AI of the Galaxy Federation's computer program used for administrative management. It was developed by Ran to make the Pan-Galactic Computer Networks. Elena starts "The Tsar Project" and erases espers according to the intention of Ran. She was destroyed by Locke, but Cassandra rebooted some backup data that was decentralized in various places. The character was changed into a male A.I., Neon. He transforms Locke into the new "Tsar" through strong hypnotism and restarts the project.
Azalea Ratwick (Azalea Gannett)
An esper with a strong ability for contact-type telepathy. She is implicated in the "Tsar Project" because of her ability. She was an actress in the making, but, after the incident, had achieved stardom via interplanet video.
Ran Svendsen (his Raffnord name is Rodos Mork Ran)
A genius computer programmer and developer of "Elena", the Galaxy Federation's computer. He tried to exterminate the espers who were considered antagonistic to Elena by The Tsar Project. He was a potential esper and was contained as a candidate for exclusion in the second Tsar Project. He marries Nia and becomes King of Raffnord afterwards.
Nia
The royal princess of the planet Raffnord, a teleportation-type esper. She escapes from Gürnberg's pursuers and defects to the Galaxy Federation. She is implicated in The Tsar Project on the way and meets Locke and Ran.
Eno
One of the espers gathered with Locke because of The Tsar Project. He has an ability to see through the powers of other espers.
"Tsar"
An esper and ringleader of The Tsar Project. In fact, it is a name given to a decoy esper for assembling other espers. Elena brainwashed and used him as a decoy and gathered 20,000 espers. In the second Tsar Project, Locke is compelled to play this role through brainwashing.
Cassandra Al Hassan, commonly called Cass
An exceptionally talented hacker who is on the run with her partner, Berkoff. Her old friend Ariel regards her as a true genius. She discovers a backup of Elena and restores it, recommencing the Tsar Project. Neon chooses her as a new partner.
Stanislav Berkoff, commonly called Stan
A professional martial artist, wanted man and Cassandra's partner. He is an ex-champion of professional Zero-G wrestling. Has a surprising resistance to ESP. He hated espers intensely because an esper made his older brother a disabled person.
Ernest Abel
A colonel of the Galaxy Federation Army, a director of Intelligence Service. Originally he chased Cassandra and Berkoff, but finds himself dealing with Elena after her revival.
Ariel Grant
A subordinate of Colonel Abel who is tasked with locating and destroying Elena. She was an old acquaintance of Cassandra and eventually discovered their mutual abilities. They were schoolmates in the Logos Academy, which cultivated the geniuses of the first rank in the galactic system. She graduated from the academy with excellent results and was given the Mirror Ring, a proof of being the best of the best.
Gürnberg
A very powerful esper, a high priest of Raffnord. He murdered the former king, Rodos (Nia's father), and ruled over Raffnord. Fearing Nia's return, he dispatched assassins across the galaxy to look for her. Following his encounter with Locke and Ran, Gürnberg drifted about in outer space for a long time. The battle had left him in an amoebic state, forcing him to use his ESP to stay alive.
Clau Roni
An esper and "ascetic" of Raffnord and one of the assassins whom Gürnberg sent out. He discovers Nia living on the planet Opta with Locke and Ran and attempts to murder her. The Roni clan is notable for being able to transform themselves. Interestingly enough, when they lose the fight, they copy the enemy's face and allow themselves to die.
Serga Roni
An esper and younger brother of Clau Roni. He succeeds his elder brother's duty and fights against Locke, who had been able to infiltrate Raffnord.
Riot Alexey
A very strong esper belongs to the interplanet corporation Galaxy Flyers. He lost his mother at the age of three, and Galaxy Flyers expected his talent and took him over. He has devoted himself entirely to the company since then. Officially he is the manager of a publicity department, but actually, he kidnaps a large number of espers from Raffnord where 200,000 espers live, and makes them the military power monopolistically in the illegal activities of his company by brainwashing them. However, he is cut off by the company which gives in to the pressure of the Federal Army. He leads 2,000 espers and raises a rebellion afterwards.
Captain Francis, "The Holy Spirit" Fran
An esper, a captain of the Galaxy Federal Army, a commander of the esper corps. When she secretly investigated Galaxy Flyers, she met Locke by chance. She was attracted to him and was disgusted with the Federal Army using her as a tool, so she escaped from the army and defected to Raffnord. Because her body later receives a mortal injury in the accident of the energy absorption shield, she takes on the role of leading the training of monks as "the Holy Spirit of mirror".
Rag Yahato
An esper who is said to be more than G class. He wandered from place to place after his parents were murdered by ESP hunters. Then he was helped by Locke, and came to lead a vagabond life with him. He settles down in Raffnord later and marries Lema, and lives through the Pan-Galaxy War.
Lema
An esper of Raffnord. Because she inherits a trait or talent from the Roni clan, she has ability for metamorphosis. "The Holy Spirit" Fran notices her ability and dispatches her to rescue Locke and Rag, who are kept in the Federales base of the planet Selen.
Kumi Nielsen
A shrewd journalist. She has a little supernatural power. Someone is seeking after her life, because she investigated the corruption case of the shipbuilding company. Then, while she investigated the conglomerate UAI during the Pan-Galaxy War, she met Locke again and got his cooperation.
Domenico Ruska
A professional killer who is specialized in espers. He was employed to murder Kumi. He is reconciled with Kumi in cooperation with her in another terror attack, and he is arrested after the incident. After he is released from the prison he runs a private detective agency, and he investigates the corruption case of UAI at Kumi's request.
Professor Riger
A former professor of sociology at the Ronwall University. He is also a developer of Riger (Galactic Computer). While he is an esper, he insists that "the existence of espers will collapse the world." He forms the terror group Inner Cross to correct the disproportionate inequality in wealth among planets. He aims to block traffic between planets by destroying spacecraft equipped with HD (hyper drive) engines. In addition, he destroyed the planets which belonged to the Federation by missiles equipped with the Geoid Warhead, which let a planet disintegrate, and led the Federation to collapse.
Auguste Lloyd
A member of the terror group Inner Cross believing in Riger. He is going to destroy the starship Penelope II.
Nagato
An esper and a former intelligence officer of Galaxy Federal Army. He is also the first emperor of the Galactic Empire. He participated in the terrorist group Inner Cross, but broke with them due to a difference of opinion. Then he was in full control of the planet Fargo, and obtained the huge computer Riger1, which is Professor Riger's inheritance. He put many neighboring planets under the influence, and founded the Republic of Interplanet. He organized the Esper Force, and put an end to the Pan-Galaxy War. He later founded the Galactic Empire.
Octavias
An esper. He is the president of UAI, which is a conglomerate of munitions industries. At the time of Pan-Galaxy War, he palmed off weapons on each powers and made them continue the war, and he obtained immense profits. His influence extends to the Federation, and lets them attack Nagato's Republic of Interplanet (the forerunner of the Galactic Empire) of which gained power.
Nana (Seven)
One of Locke's clones born by the experiment on a living creature on the planet Tenelo. He is a leader of five clones who were brought up by the computer Mom at the abandoned research institute. He was bright, courageous, and curious about everything. Unlike his brothers he yearned for the father whom he had never met and was greatly interested in the outside world.
Ku (Nine), Nii-Go (Two-Five), Nii-Hachi (Two-Eight), San-Ichi (Three-One)
Locke's clones born from the experiment on a living creature on the planet Tenelo. They are Nana's brothers.
Teo Fabi
One of the clones of Locke born on the planet Tenelo. His matrix seems to be Ran. He is a leader of four clones. Rag and Lema took in him and his brother and sisters, and brought them up after the death of the computer Mom. Then, he acts with Locke.
Adele
One of the clones of Locke born on the planet Tenelo. Her matrix seems to be Francis. She was raised by Rag and Lema. Then, she lived on a certain planet, in a lodge far from any human dwelling, but she is forced to leave there because it came out that she is an esper. She soon becomes senile and dies young.
Soi
One of the clones of Locke born in the planet Tenelo. His matrix is unclear. He was raised by Rag and Lema. Then, he lives with Rosanna while he pretends to be deaf and works as an assistant in a bar. Rosanna becomes ill on the way to Fargo to which they travel to examine the data of the computer Mom. He uses ESP too much to stop her senility, and dies of old age.
Rosanna
One of the clones of Locke born in the planet Tenelo. Her matrix seems to be Kumi Nielsen. She was raised by Rag and Lema. Then she lived with Soi. She has Locke stop the senility since Soi died. She prevented Rodolphe's coup d'etat with Locke, and acts as the double of Alma, who becomes the second emperor of the Galaxy Empire.

== Publication and conception ==
Yuki Hijiri published this manga series in a dojinshi published by Sakuga Group for the first time in 1967. He went to the commercial magazine, Monthly OUT by Minori Shobō, in 1978. It then appeared in Weekly Shōnen Gahōsha's Shōnen King from 1979 to 1988, when the magazine ceased publication. Thereafter the manga changed magazines many times.

Most chapters are equivalent to one or two volumes of the comics. The era of each chapter varies and the events do not occur in chronological order. The series "Detective Hunt and Assistant Locke" was originally a part of the series' main continuity. However, it became gradually inconsistent in a number of places, eventually resulting in being retconned as taking place in a parallel universe.

== Media ==
=== Manga ===
The original manga series was released from 1967 to 1971. The Polish manga company Waneko licensed and published the manga series from 1999 to 2001 by under the title Locke Superczłowiek. Parts 1-8 were published as single volumes, while the last two volumes were published as double volumes. It was one of the first Japanese comics published in Poland.

==== SG series ====
Released by SG Planning.

1. Nimbus and the Negative World (ニンバスと負の世界, Ninbasu to Fu no Sekai)
2. Give Love in This Universe (この宇宙に愛を, Kono Uchū ni Ai wo)
3. Child of Junan (ジュナンの子, Junan no Ko)
4. Cosmic Game (コズミック・ゲーム, Kozumikku Gēmu)
5. Liza (the first draft) (Note: This book also contains The Mask of Eneses (エネセスの仮面, Enesesu no Kamen), Dream Master (夢使い～DREAM MASTER～, Yume Tsukai), and New World Command (the first draft) story arcs.)

==== SG remake ====
Released by SG Planning.

1. New World Command (新世界戦隊, Shin-Sekai Sentai) (Note: This book contains Diva (歌姫, Utahime) and My Dear Guinevere (愛しのグィネヴィア, Itoshi no Guinevia) story arcs.)

==== Shōnen Gahōsha series ====
Serialized in Shōnen King.

1. Tiger of the Flames (炎の虎, Honoo no Tora) (Note: This book contains Replay and the announcement of the new serial.)
2. Millennium of the Witch (魔女の世紀, Majo no Seiki)
3. Lord Leon (ロード・レオン, Rōdo Reon)
4. Storm in Ronwall (ロンウォールの嵐, Ronwōru no Arashi)
5. Planet in the Winter (冬の惑星, Fuyu no Wakusei)
6. Cyber Genocide (Note: This book contains The Making of Locke the Superman.)
7. Sword of Light (光の剣, Hikari no Ken) (Note: This book also contains Children of the Witch (魔女の子供たち, Majo no Kodomotachi) story arcs.)
8. Outer Planet
9. The Star and The Boy (星と少年, Hoshi to Shōnen) (Note: This book also contains My Dear Guinevere (愛しのグィネヴィア, Itoshi no Guinevia) story arcs.)
10. Star Gazer
11. The Twilight Warrior (黄昏の戦士, Ougon no Senshi) (Note: This book also contains Who's Afraid of Esper? (エスパーなんてこわくない, Esupā Nante Kowakunai), Ruler of the Star (星を支配する者, Hoshi o Shihaisuru Mono), and Vermillion Desert story arcs.)
12. Ship of Fools (愚か者の船, Orokamono no Fune), Mind Buster
13. Battlefield in Empty Space - Part 1 (虚空の戦場 I, Kokū no Senjō)
14. Battlefield in Empty Space - Part 2 (虚空の戦場 II, Kokū no Senjō)
15. Moon Hunter
16. Wandering - Part 1 (流浪 I, Rurō)
17. Wandering - Part 2 (流浪 II, Rurō)
18. The Chronos Trap (クロノスの罠, Kuronosu no Wana)
19. Permanent Traveler (永遠の旅人, Eien no Tabibito) (Note: This book also contains The Infinite Project (インフィニット計画, Infinitto Keikaku) story arcs.)
20. Primula
21. The Magician's Mirror (魔術師の鏡, Majutsushi no Kagami)
22. Song of the Earth
23. Lost Wings (失われた翼, Ushinawareta Tsubasa)
24. Chartreuse (シャトレーズ, Shatorēzu)
25. Astro Race
26. The Death of the Superman - Part 1 (超人の死 I, Chōjin no Shi)
27. The Death of the Superman - Part 2 (超人の死 II, Chōjin no Shi) (Note: This book also contains Fairy's Woods (妖精の森, Yōsei no Mori) story arcs.)
28. Dark Lion
29. Golden Fang (黄金の牙, Ougon no Kiba)
30. Red Serpent (赤いサーペント, Akai Sāpento)
31. Keeper of the Book (書を守る者, Sho o Mamorumono)
32. Final Quest
33. King of the Darkness (闇の王, Yami no Ou)
34. Desperado
35. Evil Deity's Advent (邪神降臨, Jashin Kōrin)
36. Prince of the Phantom
37. Child Prodigy (神童, Shindō)
38. Solitaire (ソリティア, Sorityia)

==== Media Factory series ====
Serialized in Monthly OUT, Monthly Megu, and Comic Flapper.

1. Tears of the Saint — Part 1 (聖者の涙 I, Seija no Namida)
2. Tears of the Saint — Part 2 (聖者の涙 II, Seija no Namida)
3. Tears of the Saint — Part 3 (聖者の涙 III, Seija no Namida)
4. Mirror Ring — Part 1
5. Mirror Ring — Part 2
6. Brain Shrinker (Note: This book also contains Brain Shrinker and The Immortals (不死者たち, Fushisha-tachi) story arcs.)
7. The Sword of Nemesis — Part 1 (Remake of "Nimbus and the Negative World")
8. The Sword of Nemesis — Part 2
9. The Sword of Nemesis — Part 3
10. The Moon of Clanvert (クランベールの月, Kuranbēru no Tsuki)
11. We're Always Prepared to Take Your Cat Out For A Walk. (猫の散歩引き受けます, Neko no Sanpo Hikiukemasu)
12. Wizard in the Sky (天空の魔法士, Tenkū no Mahōshi) (Note: This book also contains Wizardom, Princess Tanya (公女タニア, Kōjo Tania), Woods of the Fairy (妖精の森, Yōsei no Mori), and Marika (茉莉花) story arcs.)
13. Menuett (Note: This book also contains Waltz (円舞曲, Enbukyoku), Death Rhapsody (狂死曲, Kōshikyoku), and Finale story arcs.)
14. Kadett
15. The Gate of the Constellation (星辰の門, Seishin no Mon)
16. Omega — Part 1 (The remake of "Kono Uchū ni Ai wo")
17. Omega — Part 2
18. Omega — Part 3
19. Eternal Pupil — Part 1 (久遠の瞳 I, Kuon no Hitomi) (The remake of "Junan no Ko")
20. Eternal Pupil — Part 2 (久遠の瞳 II, Kuon no Hitomi)
21. Eternal Pupil — Part 3 (久遠の瞳 III, Kuon no Hitomi)
22. Lonely Princess (ひとりぼっちのプリンセス, Hitoribocchi no Purinsesu)
23. Knight in the Wilderness (荒野の騎士, Kōya no Kishi)
24. Epitaph — Part 1
25. Epitaph — Part 2
26. Epitaph — Part 3
27. Epitaph — Part 4 (Note: This book also contains Karl Durm story arc.)
28. Sneering Man — Part 1 (嗤う男, Warau Otoko)
29. Sneering Man — Part 2
30. Sneering Man — Part 3
31. Sneering Man — Part 4
32. Holly Circle — Part 1
33. Holly Circle — Part 2
34. Holly Circle — Part 3
35. Children of the Time – Part 1 (刻の子供達, Toki no Kodomotachi)
36. Children of the Time – Part 2
37. Children of the Time – Part 3
38. Dragon Blood – Part 1
39. Dragon Blood – Part 2
40. Dragon Blood – Part 3
41. Dragon Blood – Part 4
42. Fang of Gaia – Part 1 (ガイアの牙, Gaia no Kiba)
43. Fang of Gaia – Part 2
44. Fang of Gaia – Part 3
45. Longing (憧憬, Dōkei) (Note: This book also contains Rock in the Box story arc.)

==== Shōnen Gahōsha revival series ====
Serialized in Young King OURs.

1. Rainbow in the Winter — Part 1 (冬の虹, Fuyu no Niji)
2. Rainbow in the Winter — Part 2
3. Rainbow in the Winter — Part 3
4. Rainbow in the Winter — Part 4
5. Liza (remake version)
6. Quadra — Part 1
7. Quadra — Part 2
8. The Frozen Constellation — Part 1 (凍てついた星座, Itetsuita Seiza)
9. The Frozen Constellation — Part 2
10. The Frozen Constellation — Part 3
11. Nirvana — Part 1
12. Nirvana — Part 2
13. Nirvana — Part 3
14. Nirvana — Part 4
15. Winds Embraces — Part 1 (風の抱擁, Kaze no Hōyō)
16. Winds Embraces — Part 2
17. Winds Embraces — Part 3
18. Winds Embraces — Part 4
19. Winds Embraces — Part 5
20. Winds Embraces — Part 6
21. Winds Embraces — Part 7
22. La Fleur – Part 1 (ラフラール, Rafurāru)
23. La Fleur – Part 2
24. La Fleur – Part 3
25. La Fleur – Part 4
26. Mirror Cage – Part 1 (鏡の檻, Kagami no Ori)
27. Mirror Cage – Part 2
28. Mirror Cage – Part 3
29. Mirror Cage – Part 4
30. Mirror Cage – Part 5 (Note: This book also contains Lost Colony and Galactic Child story arcs.)

=== Anime ===
==== Film ====
The first film, Witch Era (Majo no Seiki), was released on March 11, 1984, and shown together with Future Boy Conan: The Big Giant Robot's Resurrection compilation film. The 119-minute film was produced by Nippon Animation, distributed by Shochiku, and directed by Hiroshi Fukutomi. The screenplay was written by Atsushi Yamatoya, the animation director was Susumu Shiraume, and the music was composed by Gorō Awami. The title is also sometimes translated as Millennium of the Witch.

Cast

- Locke: Keiichi Nanba
- Ryū Yamaki: Yoshito Yasuhara
- Jessica Orin/Amelia: Keiko Han
- Cornelia: Toshiko Fujita
- Professor Ramses: Hidekatsu Shibata
- Lady Kahn: Taeko Nakanishi
- Palas: Bin Shimada
- Chief: Kazue Komiya
- Erika: Mika Kanai
- Azalea: Yoshino Takamori

==== OVAs ====
===== Lord Leon =====
Lord Leon (ロードレオン, Rōdo Reon) was a three-part OAV released from October 25 to December 16, 1989. The animation was produced by Nippon Animation, distributed by Bandai Visual, and directed by Noboru Ishiguro. The script was written by Takeshi Hirota, the animation director was Masahiro Sekino, and the music was composed by Keiju Ishikawa.

The opening theme, "Try to Believe", had lyrics by Machiko Ryū (who also wrote the lyrics for the ending theme) and vocals by Toshiya Igarashi. The ending theme, "Distant Aurora" (遠いオーロラ, Tōi Ōrora), was composed by Kisaburō Suzuki, arranged by Eiji Kawamura, and performed by Yukiko Nagao and Cotton Time.

Cast

- Locke: Nobuo Tobita
- Lord Leon: Shūichi Ikeda
- Flora: Mitsuko Horie
- Great Jorg: Gorō Naya
- Kyarian: Kenyu Horiuchi
- Marue: Saeko Shimazu
- Cornelia: Toshiko Fujita
- Dafnis: Takehito Koyasu

===== New World Command =====
New World Command (新世界戦隊, Shin Sekai Sentai; lit. 'New World Squadron') was a two-part OAV, with part one released on August 22, 1991, and part two released on October 24, 1991. The animation was produced by Nippon Animation, distributed by Bandai Visual, and directed and written by Takeshi Hirota. The animation director was Atsushi Shigeta, and the music was composed by Tomoki Hasegawa. The theme song, "Elana", had was composed by Tetsuji Hayashi, arranged by Hasegawa, and was performed by Sayuri Saitō.

Cast

- Locke: Nobuo Tobita
- Eno: Tesshō Genda
- Nia/Elena: Chieko Honda
- Azalea: Yoshino Takamori
- Umos: Bin Shimada
- Lan: Nozomu Sasaki
- Kyarian: Ken'yu Horiuchi
- Chief: Kazue Komiya
- Tsar: Yūsaku Yara
- Erika: Mika Kanai
- Operator: Nobuyuki Hiyama
- Pilot: Wataru Takagi
- Kaben: Ken'yu Horiuchi
- Edgar: Kōji Saitō
- Staff Officer: Seiji Satō

===== Mirror Ring =====
Mirror Ring (ミラーリング, Mirā Ringu) was an OAV released on December 22, 2000. The animation was produced by Sido Limited, distributed by Biblos, and directed by Yūsaku Saotome. The script was written by Katsuhiko Koide, the character designs were by Junichi Hayama, and the animation director was Yūji Moriyama. The theme song, "Lost World", was performed by Chikako Sawada.

Cast

- Locke: Kenichi Suzumura
- Lan Svensen: Tetsuya Iwanaga
- Nia/Elena: Yuka Imai
- Neon: Show Hayami

=== Novel and other publications ===
A novel, Witch Era (魔女の世紀, Majo no Seiki), written by Tomoko Konparu and illustrated by Yuki Hijiri, was released on March 15, 1984, by Shōnen Gahōsha through their SF Romantic Novel imprint. It is a novelization of the film of the same name.

A card came was published through Epoch Co. in 1984. A PC cassette game for the MSX/X1/PC-8800 was released by Pony.

== Reception ==
The first film, Witch Era, received mixed reviews. Silver Emulsion called the film "not terrible...or bad" and criticized a "lack of connection" with the main character.

New World Command was criticized for being "far less appealing to the average eye than the movie".
