= Sakuga Group =

Japanese manga dōjin group

Sakuga Group (Japanese: 作画グループ, Hepburn: Sakuga Gurūpu) is a Japanese manga dōjin group. It was active from 1962 to 2016. The official name of the group is Nihon Tōitsu Stōri Sakuhin Kenkyū Sakuga Gurūpu (日本統一ストーリィ作品研究会作画グループ; lit. 'Japan Unified Story Artwork Research Drawing Group'). The representative of the group is Osaka-born Yoshiaki Baba, who established the group while in junior high school. Many professional mangaka have participated in the group despite it being an amateur group.

== Main activities ==
Their primary activity involved a standard system which involved a member submitting their original work to the group where they received critique from volunteer members which was then published in the group's bulletin.

While the group generally did not attend dōjinshi conventions, they did exhibit original drawings and announce works for a variety of formats including kashi-hon, dōjinshi, and traditional commercial formats which drew criticism for being too commercial. However, they retained high standards for their original work and continued simpler activities such as sharing nikuhitsu kairanshi (肉筆回覧誌)—original hand-drawn work in a sketchbook or notepad—until the 1980s. They believed this would result in higher quality work through members showing their techniques, such as their linework, with other members.

Some members went on to become professional manga artists such as Yuki Hijiri whose Locke the Superman was first published for members of the Sakuga Group in 1967 and later serialized in Shōnen King. Group membership exceeded 1,000 in the 1980s as fans joined.

=== Gassaku ===
Members of the group sometimes produced collaborative work (合作, gassaku) which were published in manga magazines.

- Akira–Mio Daihyōryū (アキラ・ミオ大漂流) - Weekly Shōnen Magazine (1972)
- Dariusu no Kaze (ダリウスの風) - Weekly Shōjo Comic (1977)
- Ginga o Tsugu Mono (銀河を継ぐもの) - Weekly Shōjo Friend (1981)
- Issenman-nin no Futari (1000万人の2人) - Weekly Shōnen King (1978)
- Berenusu no Robin: Honō no Densetsu (ベレヌスのロビン 炎の伝説) - Shōnen King (1982)
- Berenusu no Robin: Honō no Senshi (ベレヌスのロビン 炎の戦士) - Sakuga Group series (1984)

== Member of a professional Artists ==
=== Mangaka ===
- Ryō Azumi
- Yoku Hayami
- Yuki Hijiri
- Ayano Kitahara
- Natsuno Kiyohara
- Tomoko Kōsaka
- Tarō Minamoto
- Kei Shimizu (mangaka)
- Kazuki Yamamoto

=== Novelist ===
- Eiji Ōtsuka
- Kazuyuki Takami
