= Kelly Kozumi Shinozawa =

Japanese manga artist

Kelly Kozumi Shinozawa (Japanese: ケリー篠沢) is a Japanese female manga artist.

Shinozawa was born in Toyota, Aichi, Japan. After studying Visual design at Nagoya Zokei Junior College of Art & Design, Nagoya, she started to published her Shōjo manga work in Shueisha's Ribon Original and Ribon magazines in 1990, using her pen name of Kozumi Shinozawa (Japanese: 篠沢こずみ).

In 2002, Shinozawa moved to New York City, and studied Graphic design at Parsons School of Design, NYC. She was influenced by her roommate to embrace Christian faith, and was baptized at Japanese American United Church.

From 2008, Shinozawa changed her pen name to Kelly Shinozawa. Her best known work is Manga Messiah and Manga Metamorphosis of the Manga Bible Series, that have been translated into twenty one languages of the world.
