= Ryō Azumi =

Japanese manga artist

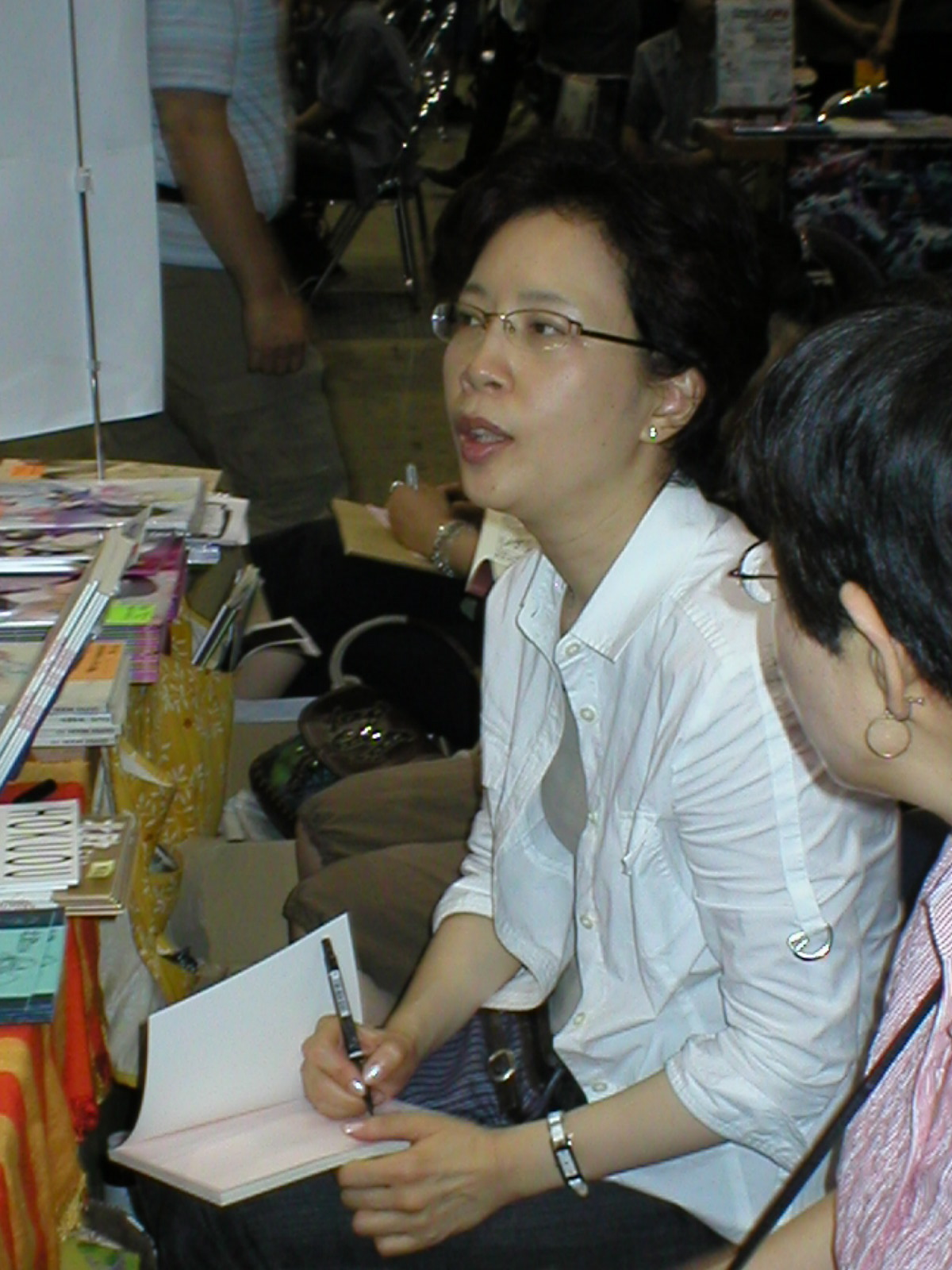
- Notable works: Ring of the Nibelungen; Mysterion; Manga Mutiny; Manga Melech; Manga Messengers; Manga Majesty

Ryō Azumi (あずみ 椋, Azumi Ryō) is a Japanese manga artist whose works draw on Old Norse literature and other subjects from Northern Europe.

== Biography and career ==
In high school, start drawing manga seriously. After that, joined the same Manga Dōjin group "Sakuga Group". Azumi published her first work in 1981 and made steady contributions to Wings and other magazines in the early 1980s. In 1986 she published the first part of her magnum opus, The Scarlet Sword (緋色い剣, Akai Tsurugi). The work appeared in installations up to 1993, consisting of a total of 1675 pages in 10 volumes. Akai Tsurugi takes place in the 10th century Nordic world, following both mortal heroes invented by the author and the Norse gods struggling against Ragnarök. The author attempts to situate her story naturally within the Norse literary tradition, working with such real historical themes as the social changes brought on by the conversion of the Norse peoples to Christianity. Many of Azumi's other works explore similar subjects.

=== Recent works ===
More recent series by Azumi include the following.

- Ring of the Nibelungen (ニーベルングの指環, Nīberungu no yubiwa) A four volume series based on Der Ring des Nibelungen, published 1989–1991
- Mysterion (ミステリオン, Misuterion) A five volume series published 1992–1995
- Like the Lion (獅子の如く, Shishi no gotoku) A five volume series based on the life of Óláfr Tryggvason, published 1994–2001
- Manga Mutiny, Manga Melech, Manga Messengers, Manga Majesty books 3-5,6 in the biblical Manga Messiah series published 2009–2019
