= Manga Bible (series) =

Christian manga series

- Cover of first book in the series, Manga Messiah

みんなの聖書 (Minna no seisho)
- Genre: Christian literature
- Manga
- Written by: Hidenori Kumai (熊井秀憲)
- Illustrated by: Kozumi Shinozawa, Ryō Azumi
- Published by: Next, Japan Bible Society
- English publisher: Tyndale House
- Original run: January 2006 – October 2019
- Volumes: 6

Manga Bible (Japanese: みんなの聖書 マンガシリーズ = Minna no Seisho - Manga shiriizu, meaning "Everybody's Bible - Manga Series") is a six-volume manga series based on the Christian Bible created under the direction of the non-profit organization Next, a group formed by people from the manga industry. Though first published in English, the books are originally written in Japanese and each volume is illustrated by a Japanese manga artist. Each book is adapted from the Bible by Hidenori Kumai. The first two books were illustrated by manga artist Kozumi Shinozawa, while the remaining four were by Ryō Azumi.

The first book in the series, Manga Messiah was published in 2006 and covered the four gospels of the Bible: Matthew, Mark, Luke, and John. Manga Metamorphosis (2008) covers the events in Acts and several of Paul's letters. Manga Mutiny (2008, 2009) begins in Genesis and ends in Exodus. Manga Melech (2010) picks up where Manga Mutiny left off and continues into the reign of David. Manga Messengers (2011) addresses events starting with the reign of King Solomon and takes stories from several of the major and minor prophets, and the Book of Esther and concludes with anticipation of a messiah. The sixth and the final book from the series, Manga Majesty (2019) concludes the story of apostle John's revelation in the island of Patmos and the revelations that mark the end of days.

== Production ==
The Manga Bible series is the creation of Next, a non-profit organization created in 2006 to produce and distribution biblically-based manga series for distribution in a multitude of languages worldwide. Next was formed by Roald Lidal, general director of New Life League Japan, pulling together manga publishing and printing professionals from Japan, and includes Japanese manga artists and other professionals in the manga industry.

Lidal created the Manga Bible series in order to "reach children who might resist traditional Bible translations and never attend a church." When he first announced his vision, it was met with some derision, with other Christians feeling the books would be insulting to the gospel. Lidal was persistent, and continued his vision to produce the six book series, with three covering the Old Testament and three covering the New Testament portions of the Christian Bible.

Each book in the series is initially written in Japanese by Christian Japanese artists, then translated to additional languages and published by regional religious publishers. Each language edition is reviewed by members of regional Bible societies before publication, to ensure accurate translation.

== Media ==
The first book of the series, Manga Messiah, was scripted by Hidenori Kumai and illustrated by Kelly Kozumi Shinozawa. Though initially written in Japanese, the English edition was published first, premiering in the United Kingdom and the Philippines in 2006. In North America, Tyndale House purchased the English rights for all the books in the series, publishing Manga Messiah in September 2007. COMIX35 acted as the English consultants for translating the Japanese editions into English. The Spanish language editions are being published by the American Bible Society. The Japanese language edition was published in Japan in February 2008. All six volumes of the Japanese versions were made available as a box set on April 12, 2021. After the completion of the sixth volume, Manga Majesty, the volume reading were arranged according to the Old Testament and the New Testament in the order of Manga Mutiny, Manga Melech, Manga Messengers, Manga Messiah, Manga Metamorphosis, and Manga Majesty respectively.

=== Volume list ===
No.	Title	Original release date	English release date
1	Manga Messiah; Kyūseishu (Meshia) - Jinruio Sukuishimono (救世主（メシア）―人類を救いし者 (Messiah - The saviour of mankind))	February 1, 2008; 978-4-8202-4266-6	September 1, 2007; 978-1-4143-1680-2
Chapter 1: The Birth of Yeshuah; Chapter 2: Growth of Yeshuah; Chapter 3: John the Baptizer; Chapter 4: Preparation for Ministry; Chapter 5: At the Wedding in Cana; Chapter 6: Going to Jerusalem; Chapter 7: Return to Galilee; Chapter 8: The Seashore Road; Chapter 9: Messianic Miracles; Chapter 10: Sermon on the Mount; Chapter 11: Controversy About Beelzebub; Chapter 12: Parables; Chapter 13: Sending Out Twelve Disciples; Chapter 14: Death of John the Baptizer; Chapter 15: Lazarus Dies; Chapter 16: The Entry to Jerusalem; Chapter 17: Investigation of the Lamb of God; Chapter 18: Judas the Betrayer; Chapter 19: The Lord's Supper; Chapter 20: Garden of Gethsemane; Chapter 21: The Way to the Cross; Chapter 22: Crucifixion; Chapter 23: Resurrection and Ascension; Area Map; Character Profiles; Twelve Apostles
Manga Messiah begins with the fulfillment of the Old Testament prophecies through the birth of Yeshua. It then follows his early childhood, his growth into adulthood and subsequent ministry to the people. The story ends with his betrayal, crucifixion and eventual victory over death.
2	Manga Metamorphosis; Shito (Aposutorosu) - Tsukawasare Shishatachi (使徒（アポストロス）―遣わされし者たち (Apostles - The sent ones))	May 1, 2008; 978-4-8202-4267-3	September 1, 2008; 978-1-4143-1682-6
Chapter 1: Now What Do We Do?; Chapter 2: Unearthly Wind and Fire; Chapter 3: More Than You Asked For; Chapter 4: Could These Things Be True?; Chapter 5: Unity of Believers; Chapter 6: The Apostles' Arrest; Chapter 7: Called to Serve; Chapter 8: Cost of Conviction; Chapter 9: Spreading Flame; Chapter 10: Ancient Text Unbound; Chapter 11: Blinded by the Light; Chapter 12: No Outsiders, No Insiders; Chapter 13: A New Messenger; Chapter 14: Guardian Angels; Chapter 15: Sent to the World; Chapter 16: Unstoppable Good News; Chapter 17: Are These the Gods?; Chapter 18: The First Wave; Chapter 19: Growing Pains; Chapter 20: The Second Wave; Chapter 21: The Apprentice; Chapter 22: The Fellowship Expands; Chapter 23: Power Encounter; Chapter 24: Turning the World Upside Down; Chapter 25: People of the Book; Chapter 26: The Unknown God; Chapter 27: Good News, Great Boldness; Chapter 28: Strengthening the Disciples; Chapter 29: A Teachable Genius; Chapter 30: The Third Wave and Beyond; Chapter 31: The Dream... or the Mission?; Chapter 32: Truth Worth Dying For; Chapter 33: Gathering Clouds; Chapter 34: Defending the Truth; Chapter 35: Great Trials, Greater Opportunities; Chapter 36: Hope in the Heart of the Empire; Letters to the Believers in Philippi; Letters to the Believers in Corinth; Letters to the Believers in Ephesus; Letters to the Believers in Rome; Character Profiles; Paul's Missionary Journeys (Map); Chronology
Manga Metamorphosis begins with Yeshua’s Ascension and the coming of the Holy Spirit at Pentecost. It then follows the acts of the apostles that led to the growth of the early Church. It ends with Saul’s persecution of the Church, his dramatic conversion, and his resulting journeys that led him to Rome.
3	Manga Mutiny; Sōsei (Jeneshisu)~ Hikarioukeshi Monotachi (創世（ジェネシス）―光を受けし者たち (Genesis - Those who receive the light))	October 1, 2008; 978-4-820-24268-0	September 1, 2009; 978-1-4143-1681-9
Chapter 1: The Beginning; Chapter 2: Banished; Chapter 3: Cain and Abel; Chapter 4: The Flood; Chapter 5: The Tower of Babel; Chapter 6: The Journey of Abram; Chapter 7: Three Travelers; Chapter 8: The Destruction of Sodom; Chapter 9: The Birth of Isaac; Chapter 10: The Sacrifice; Chapter 11: Death and Marriage; Chapter 12: Esau and Jacob; Chapter 13: In the House of Laban; Chapter 14: Esau; Chapter 15: Joseph; Chapter 16: Joseph Interprets Dreams; Chapter 17: Reunion; Chapter 18: Israel Travels to Egypt; Chapter 19: Moses; Chapter 20: The Burning Bush; Chapter 21: The Courts of the Pharaoh; Chapter 22: Passover; Chapter 23: Escape from Egypt; Geography of the Old Testament Period (Map); Character Profiles
Manga Mutiny begins with Satan’s Rebellion in the heavens and the Creation of the world. It continues with the Fall of Man, the Flood, and the dispersing of man at Babel. The story then follows the lives of the Patriarchs, thus ending with the life of Moses and Israel’s Exodus from Egypt to the Red Sea.
4	Manga Melech; Ōkoku (Kingudamu) - Kuniotate Shishatachi (王国（キングダム）―国を建てし者たち (Kingdoms - The builders of nations))	October 1, 2009; 978-4-8202-4269-7	September 1, 2010; 978-1-4143-1683-3
Chapter 1: Journey to Sinai; Chapter 2: The Commandments; Chapter 3: Rebellion in the Desert; Chapter 4: The Desert Years; Chapter 5: Jericho; Chapter 6: Israel Advances; Chapter 7: The Song of Deborah; Chapter 8: Gideon the Warrior; Chapter 9: Mighty Samson; Chapter 10: Daughter of Moab; Chapter 11: Samuel; Chapter 12: The First King of Israel; Chapter 13: David the Shepherd Boy; Chapter 14: Goliath the Giant; Chapter 15: Escape; Chapter 16: On the Run; Chapter 17: Battle on Mt. Gilboa; Chapter 18: Civil War; Chapter 19: Jerusalem; Chapter 20: King of Israel; Chapter 21: Absalom's Rebellion; Chapter 22: Song of Thanksgiving; Maps; Character introductions & Family Tree
Manga Melech continues with Israel’s rebellion in the desert and the resulting wilderness journey. It then follows Israel’s conquest of Canaan, the period of the judges, and crowning of King Saul. The story then chronicles the life of David and ends with the coronation of King Solomon.
5	Manga Messengers; Yogensha (Purofettsu) - Kibōotsuge Shishatachi (預言者（プロフェッツ）―希望を告げし者たち (Prophets - Those who proclaimed hope))	January 1, 2011; 978-4-8202-4270-3	September 1, 2011; 978-1-4143-1684-0
Chapter 1: Construction of the Temple; Chapter 2: The Wealth and Wisdom of Solomon; Chapter 3: The Divided Kingdom; Chapter 4: Elijah; Chapter 5: On top of Mt. Carmel; Chapter 6: Elijah's Departure; Chapter 7: The Power of Elisha; Chapter 8: Jehu's Rebellion; Chapter 9: The Work of Jonah; Chapter 10: Amos and Hosea; Chapter 11: Isaiah; Chapter 12: Josiah's Reformation; Chapter 13: Jeremiah; Chapter 14: Road to Rebellion; Chapter 15: The Fall of Jerusalem; Chapter 16: Ezekiel's Vision; Chapter 17: Return to Jerusalem; Chapter 18: Queen Esther; Chapter 19: The Last Prophet; Chapter 20: They Who Wait for the Lord; Simplified Chronology of the Age of the Prophets; Map of the Prophet's Age
Manga Messengers begins with the reign of Solomon and the dividing of Israel after his death. It follows both Israel’s and Judah’s apostasy as well as Yahweh’s attempts to lead the people back to Himself thru the prophets. It ends with Israel’s captivity, restoration and return to Canaan.
6	Manga Majesty; Mokushiroku (Revuereishon) - Kokoro Akareshi Mononoki (黙示録（レヴェレイション）―心開かれし者の記 (Revelation - Chronicle of an open heart))	October 27, 2020; 978-4-8202-4274-1	October 8, 2019; 978-1-4964-2010-7
Chapter 1: From Death to Light; Chapter 2: Revelation of the Resurrection; Chapter 3: Light Shining in the Darkness; Chapter 4: Invitation to the Majesty; Chapter 5: Questions from Chaos; Chapter 6: The Angels and the Answers; Chapter 7: The End is the New Beginning; Chapter 8: A Meal, A Message, and A Musical Outburst; Chapter 9: A War of Promise; Chapter 10: The Unholy Trinity; Chapter 11: A Miles of Grace; Chapter 12: A Call to Arms; Chapter 13: The Betrayed Prostitute; Chapter 14: Funeral Dirge to the Fallen; Chapter 15: Celebration at the Wedding; Chapter 16: God's Triumphal Procession; Chapter 17: Divergence and Convergence; Chapter 18: The People and the Place: A Return to Eden; Chapter 19: The Call to "Come!"; Appendix
Manga Majesty brings all things to conclusion with the story of John’s Revelation on the island of Patmos. Now an old man, the apostle John again encounters angels, Yeshua and many revelations that mark the end of days.

=== Booklets ===
An abbreviated booklet version of Manga Messiah is called Manga Mission, followed by The Messiah, produced at a lower cost for mass distributions in 2016.

== Reception ==
Before its creation, some Christians expressed concern that the Manga Bible series format would "cheapen the gospel." The first book of the series, Manga Messiah, received mixed reviews from critics. Matthew J. Brady of the website "Manga Life" found Manga Messiah to be "a fairly authentic manga," feeling it had an authentic manga background and styling, but showing Western-influences in its use of full-color pages and greater amounts of captioning and text. As a whole, he felt the book was a faithful adaptation of the gospels, but did note that some slight liberties taken with the story would "probably bother steadfast Christians".

Comixology's Jason Thompson was less impressed, heavily criticizing the art of the book, referring to it as the "most basic kind of manga shorthand—awkward geometric faces with big eyes, big hair, exaggerated expressions" with "blandly attractive" main characters, "dorky caricatures" of old RPG characters used for the villains, and crudely drawn backgrounds. Both reviewers felt the book tried to include too much information, and that the authors used Jesus' Hebrew name "Yeshuah" in an attempt to make it more palatable to non-Christian readers. They also both criticized the book's occasional odd phrasing when key dialog was rewritten using modern English.

In an editorial piece, Bruce Wilson of The Huffington Post attacked the book, repeatedly quoting an anonymous source who sent him a copy of it, and Chip Berlet, a senior analyst at Political Research Associates. The trio felt the manga contained extreme anti-Semitic views and was pushing for an idea of "objectifying Jews as non human". Berlet is quoting as stating that Manga Messiah is "A colorful comic training manual for motivating young leaders of the next pogrom against Jews. Not just offensive -- ghastly and horrific in content with a clear enemy scapegoat identified for venting apocalyptic religious bigotry." In a follow-up piece, Wilson himself claimed that "Manga Messiah depicts sinister, swarthy rabbis scheming with the devils and Jews laughing at and taunting Jesus as Christ is nailed to the cross. There are no "good" Jews depicted in the comic."

Reviewer Deirdre J. Good, of the Christian think tank Ekklesia, rebuked the book for its removal of the tension between Jesus and his family and the removal of Judas from The Last Supper, suspecting that Japanese family values had been allowed to intrude upon the original text. She partially supports Wilson's assessment, feeling the depictions of the Pharisees were implausible and that "most depictions of Pharisees or other opponents are caricatures of unappealing people which become stereotypes [sic] by the time one has finished reading the book". As a whole, she felt it was too simplistic, even for a teenage audience.
