= Fate/Stay Night: Heaven's Feel III. Spring Song =

2020 anime fantasy film directed by Tomonori Sudō

- Theatrical release poster, drawn by Takashi Takeuchi.
- Directed by: Tomonori Sudō
- Screenplay by: Akira Hiyama
- Story by: Kinoko Nasu
- Based on: Fate/Stay Night by Type-Moon
- Produced by: Hikaru Kondo; Atsuhiro Iwakami; Tomotaka Takeuchi
- Starring: Noriaki Sugiyama; Noriko Shitaya; Yū Asakawa; Mai Kadowaki; Kana Ueda; Ayako Kawasumi
- Music by: Yuki Kajiura
- Production company: Ufotable
- Distributed by: Aniplex
- Release date: August 15, 2020
- Running time: 122 minutes
- Country: Japan
- Language: Japanese
- Box office: $19.2 million

Fate/Stay Night: Heaven's Feel III. Spring Song (stylized as Fate/stay night: Heaven's Feel III. spring song) is a 2020 Japanese anime fantasy action film produced by Ufotable and directed by Tomonori Sudō.

The story continues immediately from the events of Fate/Stay Night: Heaven's Feel II. Lost Butterfly, and is the final installment in a trilogy of films adapting Heaven's Feel, the third and final route of the visual novel Fate/Stay Night. It premiered in Japan on August 15, 2020, and in the United States on November 18, 2020. Like its predecessors, the film was a commercial success, grossing over $19 million in its theatrical release.

== Plot ==
After Sakura Matou killed Shinji for his attempted rape and being corrupted by the Shadow, Shirou Emiya arrives to find his body and is taunted by Zouken Matou for his role in Sakura's corruption. Before he can be killed, Rider saves him. Sakura attacks the Emiya household with Saber Alter and subdues her sister, Rin Tohsaka, in order to kidnap Illyasviel von Einzbern, who is a possible vessel for the Holy Grail like her mother was. Shirou and Rider arrive but are unable to save Illya, who surrenders for everyone's safety. Although bound to protect Shirou by Sakura's final command spell, Rider refuses to fight the now corrupted Sakura directly, so Shirou reluctantly asks Kirei Kotomine for help.

Raiding the ruined Einzbern castle, Kirei distracts Zouken and his Servant Assassin while Shirou rescues Illya, but Sakura sends a now-corrupted Berserker to chase them. Despite knowing it will eventually kill him, a desperate Shirou unseals Archer's transplanted left arm, replicating Berserker's weapon and strength with Archer's magic to defeat him. Kirei drives off Assassin by destroying Zouken's body, recalling his wish for the Grail - to satisfy his "twisted" nature. Sakura confronts Kirei and destroys his artificial heart from the last Holy Grail War, but fails to finish him off when Berserker's defeat incapacitates her.

Shirou learns from Illya and Rin that Sakura is influenced through the shadow by an evil entity known as Angra Mainyu - an Avenger-class Servant summoned by the Einzbern family in a prior war. Seeking to subdue Sakura before she gives birth to Angra Mainyu, Rin and Illya combine their abilities to show Shirou their family's recorded memories, revealing that the Holy Grail was conceived to reach the "Root" of all knowledge. Shirou uses the visions to recreate the weapon of the oldest magus, the Jeweled Sword Zelretch, at the cost of continual damage from Archer's arm. Meanwhile, Zouken plots to make Sakura his new vessel, revealing his actual body near Sakura's heart. However, Sakura retaliates by absorbing Assassin with the Shadow before ripping Zouken out of her chest and crushing him.

After a brief confrontation, Shirou convinces Rider that he will save Sakura no matter what, securing her help along with Rin. The group arrives at Fuyuki Cave, where the tainted Grail waits, but Saber Alter bars their way and only lets Rin pass on Sakura's orders. Working together, Shirou and Rider subdue Saber Alter long enough for Shirou to kill his former Servant. Confronting Sakura, Rin uses the Jeweled Sword to cut through Sakura's shadow minions - but after Sakura professes to feeling abandoned by the world, Rin cannot bring herself to kill her and is impaled while apologizing for failing as a sister. Overcome with guilt, Sakura tries sacrificing herself to stop Angra Mainyu but is stopped by Shirou; insisting they both atone by living, he projects Caster's sorcery-nullifying Rule Breaker and severs Sakura's link to The Shadow.

Despite the Shadow being purged from Sakura, Angra Mainyu still tries to emerge from the Holy Grail. Rider takes Rin and Sakura to safety while Shirou stays to destroy The Holy Grail, but a dying Kirei interferes. Shirou defeats Kirei after a vicious fistfight, the latter declaring Shirou the winner of the Holy Grail War before dying. Before Shirou can destroy the Grail at the cost of his life, Illya stops him. Revealing herself as Shirou's older sister and vowing to protect him, Illya performs the Heaven's Feel ritual to save Shirou by separating his soul from his dying body, in turn destroying the Holy Grail. As she passes on, Illya reunites with the spirit of her mother Irisviel.

In the aftermath, Rin and Sakura revive Shirou by giving his recovered soul an artificial body provided by Touko Aozaki. Resuming their relationship and finally at peace, Shirou and Sakura - along with Rin, Taiga, and a now-incarnated Rider - go to see the cherry blossoms as Shirou promised.

== Cast ==
- Noriaki Sugiyama as Shirou Emiya
- Noriko Shitaya as Sakura Matou
- Ayako Kawasumi as Saber Alter
- Jouji Nakata as Kirei Kotomine
- Kana Ueda as Rin Tohsaka
- Mai Kadowaki as Illyasviel von Einzbern
- Masane Tsukayama as Zōken Matō
- Miki Itō as Taiga Fujimura
- Tetsu Inada as True Assassin
- Yū Asakawa as Rider
- Ai Kayano as Claudia Hortensia
- Fumie Mizusawa as Ayako Mitsuzuri
- Haruhi Nanao as Sella
- Ikuya Sawaki as Kischur Zelretch Schweinorg
- Junichi Suwabe as Archer
- Masashi Uchida as Newscaster
- Miho Miyagawa as Leysritt
- Sayaka Ōhara as Justeaze Lizrich von Einzbern
- Shinnosuke Tachibana as Makiri Zolgen
- Tadahisa Saizen as Berserker
- Yōji Ueda as Nagato Tohsaka

== Production ==
Heaven's Feel III. spring song is produced by ufotable, directed by Tomonori Sudō, written by Akira Hiyama, and featuring music from Yuki Kajiura. The first visual for the film was released in October 2019. Subsequent ones were publicly distributed on October 28 and November 17, 2019. Its March 28, 2020 release date was confirmed in a trailer featuring the main theme, Aimer's "Haru wa Yuku" (春はゆく; "Spring Goes By").

Tomonori Sudō expressed relief when the film was released, favoring many scenes, including Rider's fight against Saber Alter, the relationship between Sakura and Rin, and Illya's new design, among others. The cast praised Aimer's performance for her song during the release of the movie.

== Release ==
The film was originally scheduled to premiere in Japan on March 28, 2020, but it was postponed to April 25, 2020, and then again to August 15, 2020, due to concerns over the COVID-19 pandemic. Aniplex of America originally planned to present a preview screening of the film in the United States on April 17, 2020, at the Orpheum Theater in Los Angeles and to begin wider theatrical screenings across the United States starting on May 7, 2020. However, due to concerns over the pandemic, the U.S. premiere was cancelled, and all North American theatrical screenings were postponed to November 18, 2020. The film was released on DVD and Blu-ray on March 31, 2021, in Japan.

== Reception ==
The film's opening topped the Japanese box office, 270,000 tickets sold for a gross of 474,890,600 yen ($4.48 million) in its opening weekend. The movie made 1 billion yen at the Japanese box office in 11 days, reaching the milestone quicker than the first two films, and sold a total of 620,000 tickets in that time. The film went on to earn more than 1.9 billion yen ($18 million) by October 15, 2020, in Japan, until December 31, it grossed 2 billion yen ($18.8 million) in Japan, making it the highest-grossing film in the Heaven's Feel trilogy.

The film went on to earn $682,049 in South Korea, $124,140 in Australia, $17,588 in New Zealand, $259,051 in Hong Kong, and $75,000 in Mexico.

In the United States, the film opened in 10th place at the box office, with estimated earnings of $200,000 from a limited release in 304 theaters.

Kim Morrissy from Anime News Network gave the film a "A-", praising the end of Sakura's arc and multiple fight scenes but felt not every character had their own respective outstanding fight. Anime UK News gave it a 9 out of 10, calling a suitable ending not only for the Heaven's Feel arc but also the entire franchise. Chris Beveridge from the Fandom Post also gave it several big scores, praising the emotions the characters express in the narrative, praising how Shirou develops as a fighter in his quest to save Sakura while claiming that antagonistic forces like Berserker and Kirei Kotomine also developed impressive portrayals and fight scenes.
