= Fate/Stay Night: Heaven's Feel II. Lost Butterfly =

2019 anime fantasy film directed by Tomonori Sudō

- Theatrical release poster
- Directed by: Tomonori Sudō
- Screenplay by: Akira Hiyama
- Story by: Kinoko Nasu
- Based on: Fate/Stay Night by Type-Moon
- Produced by: Hikaru Kondo; Atsuhiro Iwakami; Tomotaka Takeuchi
- Starring: Noriaki Sugiyama; Noriko Shitaya; Yū Asakawa; Mai Kadowaki; Kana Ueda; Ayako Kawasumi
- Music by: Yuki Kajiura
- Production company: Ufotable
- Distributed by: Aniplex
- Release date: January 12, 2019
- Running time: 117 minutes
- Country: Japan
- Language: Japanese
- Box office: $19.8 million

Fate/Stay Night: Heaven's Feel II. Lost Butterfly (stylized as Fate/stay night: Heaven's Feel II. lost butterfly) is a 2019 Japanese anime fantasy action film produced by Ufotable and directed by Tomonori Sudō. The second installment in the Fate/Stay Night: Heaven's Feel trilogy, it premiered in Japan on January 12, 2019 and in the United States on March 14, 2019.

The story is adapted from Heaven's Feel, the third and final route of the visual novel Fate/Stay Night. Continuing immediately from the events of Fate/Stay Night: Heaven's Feel I. Presage Flower, the film focuses on the Holy Grail War and the relationship between Shirou Emiya and Sakura Matou, two teenagers participating in the conflict. After Shirou is eliminated from the War as a Master, he seeks salvation for Sakura and the other participants.

The film was a critical and commercial success, earning ¥1.5 billion faster than its predecessor. As of July 14, 2019, it has grossed $19.8 million worldwide and has sold over 100,000 Blu-ray/DVD copies. A sequel, Fate/Stay Night: Heaven's Feel III. Spring Song, was released in Japan on August 15, 2020.

== Plot ==
After Saber's disappearance, Shirou Emiya is effectively eliminated from the Holy Grail War, but he intends to continue fighting regardless. After returning from a meeting with Rin Tohsaka, Shirou learns that Sakura Matou has been kidnapped by her brother Shinji, and the two confront him. Sakura pleads for everyone to stop, and Rider heeds her call, revealing Sakura as her true Master. Faced with the reality that he will never be a Magus, Shinji douses Sakura with a potion that makes her lose control of her mana and flees. Archer and Rin attack Sakura, but Rider defends her and starts turning them to stone with her gaze–revealing her identity as Medusa. However, when Shirou is hurt and loses consciousness, Sakura's grief causes her to injure herself, forcing Rider to stop.

Shirou reawakens in Fuyuki Church, where priest Kirei Kotomine operates on Sakura. He explains that Sakura's body is infested by Zōken Matou's Crest Worms, which feed on her mana by arousing her. As Rin contemplates killing Sakura for the danger she poses, Kotomine reveals to Shirou that the two girls are blood sisters, with Sakura given to the Matou family for adoption. Despite Sakura's attempts to push him away for his safety, Shirou promises he will protect her even at the cost of his ideals, which also makes Rin back off. Sakura then returns to the Emiya household with Rider, who gradually begins to trust Shirou. However, Sakura becomes increasingly aroused due to the Crest Worms, and her behavior becomes erratic.

Shirou and Rin seek out Illyasviel von Einzbern in hopes of forming an alliance, but find her battling Zōken and the shadow, which unleashes the corrupted Saber to subdue Berserker so it can devour him. While Archer can drive Zōken's Assassin off, the shadow mortally wounds him and severs Shirou's left arm before retreating. Before dying, Archer cuts off his left arm and transplants it onto Shirou to save his life. Having lost their Servants, Rin and Illya move into the Emiya household to plan their next step while helping Shirou get used to his new arm, now sealed with a holy cloth as his body cannot handle Archer's power within. However, as Rin grows closer to Shirou, Sakura becomes jealous and asks him if he loves her romantically, to which Shirou affirms he does–resulting in the two having sex.

One night, Sakura sleepwalks throughout the city and kills several people. The Servant Gilgamesh attacks her, but the shadow devours him. Sakura then returns to the Emiya household, and Shirou realizes the shadow comes from her. Bedridden from injuries inflicted by Gilgamesh, Sakura is told by Illya that she has become the vessel for the Holy Grail; thus, she has little time left. Later, Illya–who is secretly Kiritsugu Emiya's biological daughter and therefore Shirou's adoptive sister–lets go of her grudge against him over seemingly abandoning her after overhearing Taiga talk about how he tried to return to her before his death. Meanwhile, Shirou is approached by Zōken, who reveals the shadow is a piece of the Holy Grail from ten years ago that he put inside Sakura and claims it is not his ally–in fact, he can barely keep it contained. Zōken tells Shirou the only way to stop the shadow is to kill Sakura, as he is the only one she trusts enough to let close, but he cannot bring himself to do it.

Seeing herself as a burden to Shirou, Sakura orders Rider to protect him and returns to the Matō estate, with Shirou giving chase. However, Shinji attempts to rape Sakura once she arrives, blaming her for his inability to become a magus. Threatened by Shirou discovering that Shinji has raped her for years, Sakura panics and kills Shinji. As Sakura realizes what she has done, the shadow fuses into her body and corrupts her.

== Production ==
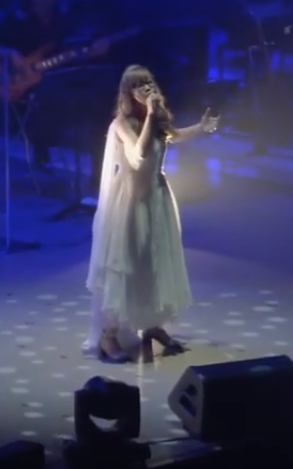
Aimer performed the film's theme

The film was revealed for the first time in May 2018. Director Tomonori Sudō found it a challenging film to develop but expressed joy in how fans reacted to the movie. Sudō further stated that he aimed to expand Shirou and Sakura's characterization in certain scenes. Another staff member stated the film has an impactful ending and looked forward to releasing the third and final Heaven's Feel film to conclude the story.

The Japanese voice cast reprised their roles from the previous film. Noriaki Sugiyama expressed how he provided a different take on Shirou, aiming to give him a cool-headed style. Noriko Shitaya enjoyed Sakura's feelings being noticed by Shirou regarding her being in love with him. Ayako Kawasumi had mixed feelings about Saber's darker characterization in the form of her new form, Saber Alter, but still wanted the fans to see her character in action. Rin Tohsaka's actress, Kana Ueda stated she felt emotional while recording parts of the film to the point of crying. Hiroshi Kamiya found his character, Shinji Matou, to have evolved in darker ways across the Fate franchise to the point he said Shinji was the actual antagonist of the film.

On November 1, 2018, it was announced that the theme song for the film "I beg you" would be composed by Yuki Kajiura and performed by Aimer. "I beg you" was written to explore the relationship between Sakura and Shirou, as Aimer wanted to show Sakura's dark personality as she aims to be loved by Shirou but does not want him to know about her secrets.

== Release ==
The film was released in Japan on January 12, 2019. Aniplex of America announced at Anime Expo 2018 that they would release the film theatrically in the United States, with a premiere at the Regal LA Live in Los Angeles on February 23, 2019, and a wider release, in collaboration with Fathom Events, screening theatrically from March 14, 2019. It also opened in Canada on March 14. In Australia and New Zealand, Madman Entertainment announced that they would premiere the film at Madman Anime Festival Sydney 2019 on March 16, 2019, with a wider release scheduled for later in the year. It also opened in Malaysia on April 18.

In promoting the movie, the developers made a collaboration with Pizza Hut in Japan, and various characters from the film were added to the game Puzzle & Dragons. The film was released on DVD and Blu-ray on August 21, 2019, in Japan.

== Reception ==
=== Box office ===
The film debuted at the top of Japan's box office, selling 363,080 tickets to earn ¥602,841,741 ($5.55 million) in three days. The film sold 12% more tickets and earned 18% more in its opening weekend than the first film in the trilogy. By its 12th day, the film surpassed ¥1 billion, once again surpassing the record of Presage Flower. The film dropped to number four in its third week, and to number ten in its fourth week, earning a total of ¥1,320,295,396 ($12 million). By its fifth week, the film dropped from the top ten, still earning 57,369,900 yen ($518,900), for a total of ¥1,429,918,296 ($12.93 million). As of February 19, 2019, it has sold over 1 million tickets and grossed over ¥1.5 billion ($13.54 million) in Japan.

Overseas, the film grossed HK$1.15 million in Hong Kong. The North American debut of the film earned US$420,595 at the box office in March 2019. In China, where the film released on 12 July 2019, it debuted with an opening weekend of $3.5 million. As of 14 July 2019, the film has grossed $19.8 million worldwide.

=== Music ===
The theme song "I beg you" topped Oricon's charts with 31,000 copies sold.

=== Critical response ===
Lost Butterfly received positive reviews. Kim Morrissy of Anime News Network gave the film an overall score of "A," praising its dark plot and relationships of the main characters. However, she believed the film would not be accessible to new viewers. Skyler Allen of The Fandom Post gave it an "A-," praising the fight scenes between Saber Alter and Berserker as one of the main highlights for its execution in terms of animation. He liked Shirou and Sakura's development but stated that viewers might feel uncomfortable about the latter's feelings about sexual relationships. Richard Eisenbeis of Biggest in Japan found that Shirou's character arc took a tone that contradicted his ideals from previous storylines as a result of risking losing lives for Sakura's sake, making the story a defining moment for the character.

Writing for IGN, Cristina Aldrete felt that Sakura's personality was one of the best parts of the second film because she suffers a darker characterization despite retaining her original well-meaning self. The fights between Servants were also noted to be the biggest focus of the movie. Pablo López of SDPNoticias wrote that Lost Butterfly was superior to its predecessor, and that he considered it the franchise's best release so far. He praised the movie for its focus on the relationship between Shirou and Sakura and its multiple Servant battles, which he considered highly appealing. Still, He felt that fans of Illya, Gilgamesh, and other characters might be disappointed by their lack of screentime. The presence of nudity and gore in the film were noted to be an appropriate adaptation of the visual novel's mature content, and its visuals and fight scenes were also well-received.
