= Fate/Stay Night: Heaven's Feel I. Presage Flower =

2017 anime fantasy film directed by Tomonori Sudō

- Theatrical release poster
- Directed by: Tomonori Sudō
- Screenplay by: Akira Hiyama
- Story by: Kinoko Nasu
- Based on: Fate/Stay Night by Type-Moon
- Produced by: Hikaru Kondo; Atsuhiro Iwakami; Tomotaka Takeuchi
- Starring: Noriaki Sugiyama; Noriko Shitaya; Yū Asakawa; Mai Kadowaki; Kana Ueda; Ayako Kawasumi
- Music by: Yuki Kajiura
- Production company: Ufotable
- Distributed by: Aniplex
- Release date: October 14, 2017
- Running time: 120 minutes
- Country: Japan
- Language: Japanese
- Box office: $19 million

Fate/Stay Night: Heaven's Feel I. Presage Flower (stylized as Fate/stay night: Heaven's Feel I. presage flower) is a 2017 Japanese anime fantasy action film produced by Ufotable, directed by Tomonori Sudō, written by Akira Hiyama and featuring music by Yuki Kajiura. The film is the first installment in a trilogy of films adapting Heaven's Feel, the third and final route of the visual novel Fate/Stay Night. As in previous routes, the story focuses on a teenage mage named Shirou Emiya who takes part in a conflict known as the Holy Grail War to protect his city. However, this time Shirou encounters not only other mages and Servant warriors, but also a mysterious shadow killing most of the participants.

The film premiered in Japan on October 14, 2017, and premiered in the United States between November and December 2017. The English dub for the film premiered on June 5 and 7, 2018 in the United States. The film was a critical and commercial success, and was followed by a sequel, Fate/Stay Night: Heaven's Feel II. Lost Butterfly, which premiered on January 12, 2019.

== Plot ==
After dropping the school's archery club due to an injury, amateur magus Shirou Emiya befriends a fellow student, Sakura Matou, who regularly visits his home under the care of his tutor, Taiga Fujimura. During one night, Shirou sees a fight between two mysterious warriors and is protected from one of them, a spearman, by an armored swordswoman named Saber who calls him Master. The other warrior, Archer, is in the service of Rin Tohsaka, a school acquaintance of Shirou. Rin takes Shirou to the priest Kirei Kotomine, where Shirou learns he is a Master in the current Holy Grail War; a reoccurring battle royale to claim a supernatural artifact said to grant any wish to the victor. Each Master is given the responsibility and protection of a Servant, a spirit warrior from various timelines. Kiritsugu Emiya was Saber's Master in the previous War, which caused the fire that traumatized his adoptive son Shirou.

En route back home, Shirou and Rin encounter a young girl named Illyasviel von Einzbern who attacks Saber with her Servant Berserker. However, she withdraws after Shirou injures himself to defend Saber. Later, Shirou and Saber discover Shinji Matou is the Master of Rider, who feeds on their classmate's spiritual energy. Saber defeats Rider, which causes Shinji to be ridiculed by his grandfather Zouken. Shirou asks if Sakura is involved in the war, but Shinji denies it as he and Zouken depart.

Saber stays in Shirou's house while Shirou confronts Rin about the news of citizens falling ill and dying. Suspecting the Servant Caster is responsible, Rin agrees they should find the cause of the disruption. Shirou convinces Sakura to stay at the Emiya household, hoping to keep her safe with Saber. At Ryuudou Temple, Souichirou Kuzuki and his Servants, Caster and Assassin, are killed when True Assassin bursts from Assassin's body and slays them. As Souichirou never returns to school, Rin deduces he was the Master of Caster, yet people are still falling ill. Meanwhile, Lancer is ordered to track down the new Assassin. After a long chase, Lancer is devoured by the shadow after Assassin lures him into a lake.

Shirou and Rin later encounter Zouken, controlling Caster's corpse like a puppet, but the shadow appears and devours Caster. Zouken reveals his true form - a swarm of insect familiars called Crest Worms - and retreats. The shadow attacks Rin but leaves when Shirou is injured, shielding her. The next day, Sakura confronts Saber about Shirou's safety. As Shirou recovers, he talks with Sakura about their pasts, and she asks him to stop her if she ever does something wrong. Shirou later meets Kirei, who reveals both Lancer's demise and himself as Lancer's Master. He says the shadow is a threat to the entire city, but Shirou refuses to trust him.

In the final battle, Shirou and Saber visit Ryuudou Temple, where Assassin ambushes them and lures Saber into the shadows while Zouken assaults Shirou. The shadow captures Saber and Shirou's command spells vanish. Rider comes to Shirou's rescue at the last minute and drives the attackers away. As Shirou leaves the temple, he runs into the shadow, but it vanishes without harming him. Meanwhile, Rin and Archer break into Matou's basement and find it infested with Crest Worms. Zouken has his insects devour a woman in an alley and explains to Assassin he must do this occasionally to survive. Shirou returns home and finds Sakura, who displays her concern over his injuries.

== Production ==
An adaptation of the Heaven's Feel route was first announced by Ufotable, the animation studio that produced the Unlimited Blade Works anime adaptation, on July 27, 2014 with the release of a preview featuring characters Shirou Emiya and Sakura Matou. In March 2016, Ufotable announced that the movie would be split into a trilogy. The theme song for the film was composed by Yuki Kajiura and performed by Aimer, titled "Hana no Uta" (花の唄; "A Flower's Song"). "Hana no Uta" highly focuses on Sakura's character.

Director Tomonori Sudo said he wanted to further explore the past between Shirou and heroine Sakura Matou, as he believes their relationship is the most important part of the story. Producer Yuma Takahashi had similar opinions, believing the style of some scenes that symbolize the romance between Shirou and Sakura were needed. These scenes were mostly included by Ufotable, as Takahashi believes people might want to watch the film again. Noriaki Sugiyama expressed pleasure for working as Shirou again while also noting him to act in a different way to the different route the films are taking based on the visual novel. Voice actress Noriko Shitaya enjoyed the new level of depth brought to Sakura due to how the scenes explore her feelings towards Shirou. Bryce Papenbrook looked forward to Shirou's role in the Heaven's Feel movie due to how different he is from other series, mostly due to his relationship with Sakura.

== Release ==
The film was released in Japan on October 14, 2017. Aniplex of America screened the first film theatrically in the U.S from November 3, 2017. ODEX later confirmed to premiere the film in Singapore on January 6, 2018, at Plaza Singapura, and Philippines on February 3, 2018, with its screening took place on February 7. Madman Entertainment announced that it would premiere the film in Australia at Madman Anime Festival in Melbourne on November 4, 2017, with a wider release to follow on November 16, 2017. Presage Flower premiered in the United Kingdom at Scotland Loves Anime on October 14, 2018, with MVM Entertainment releasing the films on home video. The Japanese Blu-ray/DVD for Presage Flower was released on May 9, 2018, with the English release on November 20, 2018.

== Reception ==
=== Box office ===
In its opening weekend, Presage Flower reached #1 at the Japanese box office, grossing ¥413,030,840 from 247,509 admissions within two days. It has grossed $19,027,568 worldwide as of January 2019, including ¥1.5 billion ($13.7 million) in Japan, CN¥31.62 million ($4,902,326) in China, $417,439 in South Korea and Australia, $193,833 in the United States and Canada, and $38,781 in Argentina and New Zealand.

=== Home media ===
Upon their debut, the Blu-ray and DVD versions sold 53,090 and 2,706 units respectively, topping charts in Japan. The film sold over 100,000 units in Japan as of 17 January 2019.

=== Reviews ===
Presage Flower received positive reviews. Anime News Network gave the film an overall grade of 'A', calling it a fine work of cinema and the best Fate adaptation yet. As the movie focused more on Sakura, the Fandom Post stated that her interactions with Shirou make the best scenes since Shirou's personality did not differ too much from Unlimited Blade Works. In another review, the Fandom Post enjoyed how Shirou's posttraumatic stress disorder over the fire in his city is shown connecting the story with the ending of Fate/Zero, thus exploring deeper area of his past. While the writer enjoyed his interactions with Sakura and Saber, he did not find him as engaging as the Shirou from Unlimited Blade Works persona. UK Anime Network criticized his traits, finding them "bland," but they also thought that the anime adaptation was able to properly capture Nasu's writing. Entertainment Station Japan wrote shared similar comments that Anime News Network had in regards to its appeal that might need knowledge from previous media based on the visual novel.

Anime News Network also listed it as the best film from 2017. In a poll by Anime!Anime!, the film ranked as the 2nd most best movie released in the year behind Sword Art Online The Movie: Ordinal Scale. In the "Newtype Anime Awards" from 2018, the film took second place in the category "Best Work (Theatrical Screening)" behind Bungo Stray Dogs: Dead Apple. Shirou and Archer were voted as the fifth and tenth best male characters respectively while Saber and Sakura took the respective third and fifth spots in the best female character. "Hana no Uta" took the fourth spot in best time theme song while Yuki Kajiura was in best third soundtrack.
