= Fate/Zero (TV series) =

- フェイト/ゼロ; Feito/Zero
- Genre: Action; Dark fantasy; Psychological
- Written by: Akira Hiyama; Kazuharu Sato; Takumi Miyajima; Akihiro Yoshida
- Directed by: Ei Aoki
- Composer: Yuki Kajiura
- No. of seasons: 2
- No. of episodes: 25 (list of episodes)

Production
- Producer: Atsuhiro Iwakami
- Animator: Ufotable

Original release
- Network: Tokyo MX, Tochigi Television, Gunma Television
- Release: October 1, 2011 – June 23, 2012

Fate/Zero (Note: Japanese: フェイト/ゼロ, Hepburn: Feito/Zero) is a Japanese anime television series based on Gen Urobuchi and Takashi Takeuchi's light novel series Fate/Zero. It was produced by Ufotable, directed by Ei Aoki, and written by Akira Hiyama, Kazuharu Sato, Takumi Miyajima, and Akihiro Yoshida, with Atsushi Ikariya and Tomonori Sudo designing the characters and Yuki Kajiura composing the music. The series focuses on Kiritsugu Emiya, who joins the Fourth Holy Grail War on behalf of his wife's family, the Einzberns.

Fate/Zero was broadcast in Japan on Tochigi Television, Tokyo MX and Gunma Television from October 2011 to December 2011. The second season was later broadcast on the same networks from April to June 2012.

== Plot ==
Set in Fuyuki City, Fate/Zero takes place 10 years before the events of Fate/stay night, and follows Kiritsugu Emiya, an assassin who joins the Fourth Holy Grail War on behalf of his wife.

In the fictional city of Fuyuki City, Japan, assassin Kiritsugu Emiya joins the "Fourth Holy Grail War" on behalf the Einzbern family. The Einzbern family is determined to achieve victory in the Fourth War following three consecutive failures. They were elected to bring the notorious mage killer Kiritsugu, despite his methods and reputation as a skilled mercenary and a hitman who employs all means necessary to accomplish his goals. Though Kiritsugu had once wanted to become a hero who could save everyone, he has long since abandoned this ideal upon realizing that saving one person often comes at the cost of another's life. Thus, this is the source of conflict he once sought to eliminate due to finite resources/abilities. For the sake of humanity, he resolves to ruthlessly destroy anything and anyone who threatens the peace of others.

However, Kiritsugu finds himself deeply torn between the love he has found for his new family–his wife Irisviel and their daughter Illya–and what he must do to obtain the Holy Grail. Meanwhile, Kiritsugu's greatest opponent appears in the form of the priest Kirei Kotomine. The latter is trying to discover his true nature in his quest to find the Holy Grail, which is revealed to be monstrous and full of hate. He sets his sights on Kiritsugu as a kindred spirit and possible answer to the emptiness he feels.

Towards the conclusion, the limitations of the "Holy Grail" are found to be in the fact that, while omnipotent in its wish-granting abilities, it is not omniscient, and therefore depends on the victor's knowledge and methods to determine the way by which the wish is carried out. And, to make matters worse, the last war fought over the Grail has corrupted it, causing any wish granted by the Grail to be a Monkey's Paw.

== Development ==
The anime adaptation was approved for production by December 2010. It was produced by studio Ufotable and began airing in October 2011. Fate/Zero is the third anime production in the Fate series, following the 24-episode 2006 adaptation and the 2010 Unlimited Blade Works film.

For the first cour, the opening theme is "oath sign" by LiSA and the ending theme is "Memoria" by Aoi Eir. For the second cour, the opening theme is "to the beginning" by Kalafina and the ending theme is "Up On the Sky, The Wind Sings" (空は高く風は歌う, Sora wa Takaku Kaze wa Utau) by Luna Haruna. The ending theme for episodes 18-19 is "Perfect Sky" (満天, Manten) by Kalafina.

== Release and distribution ==
The anime was originally slated to run continuously for all episodes, but was later given a season break between 13 and 14 to allow for better animation. The first season ran from October 1 to December 24, 2011, and the second season ran from April 7 to June 23, 2012. Nico Nico Douga and Aniplex simulcasted Fate/Zero worldwide with eight different language subtitles, including Korean, Chinese (traditional and simplified), English, French, German, Italian, and Spanish.

The series was licensed in North America by Aniplex of America and featured an English dub which ran on Viz Media's Neon Alley service.

== Reception ==
=== Critical response ===
The Fate/Zero television series received universal acclaim from critics.

Jacob Chapman of Anime News Network praised the series, describing it as "a treasure worth unearthing to its end" and concluded by writing: "Ambitious, brilliant, heartbreaking and masterfully crafted narrative, complex characters with powerful ideals, visually stunning, gorgeous score and strong cast in both languages." Kevin Cormack, also of Anime News Network, felt that the series cast was "full of timeless pairings — like young mage Waver Velvet with Rider servant Iskandar, and creepy priest Kirei Kotomine with legendary King of Heroes Gilgamesh." The reviewer noted that several of Fate/stay night's central human cast members are represented in Fate/Zero through the "tragic" stories of their parents, allowing the viewers to come to understand how Kiritsugu Emiya's "tortured" ideology came to influence his son Shirō.

Elliot Gay of Japanator was impressed by its pilot episode despite serving as an exposition for the masters, who he felt were more appealing than the ones from the original series thanks to Ufotable's work.

UK Anime Network's Martin gave the first part a score 9 out of 10, and the second part a perfect score of 10 out of 10. Martin characterized the story as very dark and demanding and "a dramatic and satisfying conclusion to a solidly entertaining series." T.H.E.M. Anime Reviews gave the entire series a score of 4 out of 5 stars, with reviewer Aiden Foote believing Fate/Zero as "one of the most visually impressive TV series to date" and praised the "smooth animation and consistent artwork coming together to make crisp, evocative action scenes to get the heart racing." Aiden also stated "the main reason why I really like the show is the time and effort that Urobuchi puts into the majority of the characters." However, Aiden also criticizes the pacing stating that series' biggest problem was the "plot pacing".

Richard Eisenbeis of Kotaku praised the animation, themes and the characters backstories especially Kiritsugu's. Richard started the review by writing "Gen Urobuchi has written some of the most psychologically dark anime in recent memory. He is a master at subverting anime tropes to breathe new life into stale genres." His final thoughts being "Fate/Zero is an excellent anime.” It has dynamic, multifaceted characters, explores great philosophies and themes, and tops it off with large helpings of action. It also has the will to go deep into dark, psychological territory to improve both its characters and story."

=== Sales and accolades ===
The first season's Blu-ray disc (BD) box set sold 43,000 copies in its first week, the highest-selling anime television Blu-ray box in first week-sales until then, breaking the record previously held by Haruhi Suzumiya. The second season's BD box set also topped Oricon's weekly sales, selling over 40,000 copies.

Fate/Zero won multiple top prizes during the 2nd Newtype Anime Awards, including Title of the Year, Best Studio (for ufotable), Best Soundtrack, and Best CM. It placed second for Best Theme Song ("to the beginning"), Best Director, Best Character Design and Script. In the Best Male Character category, Rider placed first, Kiritsugu placed third and Gilgamesh placed eight. In Best Character for Female, Saber placed second. It received 2 nomination at the 2014 UK Anime Network Awards in Best Action category and Best Dramatic Anime category.

In 2019, Polygon named Fate/Zero as one of the best anime of the 2010s. Crunchyroll included the series among "Top 25 anime of the decade" list, with writer Azaly Zeldin calling it "one of the best anime series of the past decade". Zeldin wrote that the series is an "expensive, beautiful and smart action thriller that consolidated the glory of ufotable, Gen Urobuchi and Yuki Kajiura, and has become for the modern anime industry something similar to what The Dark Knight means for the current wave of comic book movies." Writing for Comic Book Resources, Sage Ashford ranked it #8 on his list, stating that the "series is so important it revitalized the [Fate] franchise in the world of anime, resulting in multiple series and films that have continued even into 2019." IGN also listed Fate/Zero among the best anime of the decade, praising the series for its "dark, mature tale that doesn’t shy away from sensitive material" and for "having some of the best animation that lauded studio Ufotable has ever produced. It perfectly sets the stage for Fate/Stay Night, but beyond that, it also stands on its own as the perfect entry point into the series." Thrillist named the series one of the best anime of the 2010s, with LB writing it's "tense and unforgiving; plus, there's some freaky bug magic that will surely get your skin crawling."
