= List of Fate/Zero episodes =

Cover art of the first Fate/Zero Blu-ray Disc box, released in North America by Aniplex of America on March 7, 2012.

Fate/Zero is an anime television series adapted from the titular light novel series by Gen Urobuchi and Takashi Takeuchi. Directed by Ei Aoki and produced by Atsuhiro Iwakami of Ufotable, it consists of two seasons produced for television. The series is set ten years before the events of Fate/stay night, and tells the story of the Fourth Holy Grail War, a secret magical tournament held in Fuyuki City, Japan where several magicians known as Masters summon Servants, reincarnations of legendary souls and heroes from all across time, where they fight in a deadly battle royale where the winner obtains the Holy Grail, a magical legendary chalice capable of granting wishes. It includes both the younger versions of characters in Fate/stay night, their parents and relatives, and original characters. The main protagonist, Kiritsugu Emiya, is a ruthless mage killer that joins the tournament on behalf of his wife's family, the Einzberns. He is the foster father of Fate/stay night's protagonist, Shirou Emiya.

The anime series is jointly produced by Aniplex, Nitroplus, Notes, Seikaisha, and Ufotable. The series soundtrack was composed by Yuki Kajiura. Character designs were handled by Atsushi Ikariya and Tomonori Sudou. Art, 3D, and photography are directed by Koji Eto, Kōjirō Shishido, and Yūichi Terao respectively. The series premiered on Tokyo MX, Tochigi Television, and Gunma Television, with the first season airing from October 1 to December 24, 2011, and later dates on Television Saitama, TV Aichi, MBS TV, CTC, tvk, TVh, TVQ, BS11 and Kids Station. The second season aired from April 7 to June 23, 2012. All twenty-five episodes were then released in Blu-ray format to North America by Aniplex of America in 2019.

For the first season, the opening theme song is "Oath Sign" performed by Lisa, while the ending theme song is "Memoria" performed by Eir Aoi. For the second season, the opening theme song is "To the Beginning" performed by Kalafina, while the ending theme song is "Sora wa Takaku Kaze wa Utau" (空は高く風は歌う; lit. 'Up on the Sky, the Wind Sings') performed by Luna Haruna. The song "Manten" (满天; lit. 'The Whole Sky') performed by Kalafina is used as a special ending theme song for episodes 18 and 19.

== Series overview ==
Season	Episodes	Originally released	
Season	Episodes	First released	Last released
1	13	October 1, 2011	December 24, 2011
2	12	April 7, 2012	June 23, 2012

== Episodes ==
=== Season 1 (2011) ===
No. overall	No. in season	Title	Directed by	Animation directed by	Original release date
1	1	"The Summoning of Heroes"; Transliteration: "Eirei Shōkan" (Japanese: 英霊召喚)	Ei Aoki	Tomonori Sudō & Atsushi Ikariya	October 1, 2011
Eight years ago in Germany, Kiritsugu Emiya and his wife Irisviel von Einzbern welcome the birth of their daughter Illyasviel. Though Kiritsugu fears he will lead Irisviel to her death in the upcoming Fourth Holy Grail War, she assures him that he is a good man who will fulfill their ideals. Three years ago, the priest Kirei Kotomine learns that he has been chosen as a participant for the Holy Grail War. Kirei's father Risei Kotomine, the war's moderator on behalf of the Church of the Eighth Sacrament, and Tokiomi Tohsaka, another participant, arrange for Kirei to become Tokiomi's pupil in magecraft in order to give Tokiomi an advantage and help Kirei get over the death of his wife. One year ago in Fuyuki City, Kariya Matou visits his childhood friend Aoi Tohsaka and her daughters, Rin and Sakura. Kariya is shocked to learn that Sakura has been adopted by the Matou family to be an heir who can use magic, and he is horrified to discover what has been done to her. Confronting his father Zouken Matou, Kariya strikes a deal to implant himself with parasitic worms that will give him the magic needed to participate in the upcoming war. If he wins the Grail, Sakura will be freed and returned to her family. In the present, Kayneth El-Melloi Archibald dismisses and humiliates one of his students named Waver Velvet, who theorizes anyone can be a great mage by hard work and practice, rather than by virtue of their bloodline alone. Waver decides to prove his teacher wrong by stealing Kayneth's artifact, which is needed to summon a Servant, in order to join the war himself. As Kirei, who has now summoned his Servant Assassin (Hassan-i Sabbah), and Kiritsugu learn of each other's skills, they are disturbed by how they cannot know what the other man's goals for the war are. After receiving the scabbard of the sword Excalibur, Irisviel is hopeful that they can summon Saber (Arthur Pendragon), but Kiritsugu worries that Arthur's chivalry will clash with his pragmatic methods. As Kiritsugu, Tokiomi, Kariya and Waver each summon their Servants, Kiritsugu and Irisviel are stunned to see that the summoned Saber is actually a woman.
2	2	"The Fake First Shot"; Transliteration: "Itsuwari no Sentan" (Japanese: 偽りの戦端)	Kei Tsunematsu	Tomonori Sudō & Atsushi Ikariya	October 8, 2011
Waver has a hard time commanding his Servant Rider (Iskander), as Rider is more interested in how the world has changed since his time and intends to conquer it once he wins the war. Saber has formed a poor opinion of Kiritsugu, considering him cold-hearted, but is surprised to see him have a tender moment with his daughter Illya. Saber also admits she admires Kiritsugu and Irisviel's wishes to save the world, as she also wishes to save Britain. In Fuyuki City, serial killer Ryūnosuke Uryū has murdered an entire family except a young boy to summon a demon, but inadvertently calls the Servant Caster (Gilles de Rais). When Uryū offers the boy to Caster as a sacrifice, Caster pretends to let him go, then kills him with a horrific Cthulhu-esque monster. Uryū, overjoyed to meet someone as sadistic as him, vows to follow Caster anywhere and becomes his Master. Upon learning that the seventh and final Master has been chosen, Kirei orders Assassin to kill Tokiomi, only for Assassin to be killed by Tokiomi's Servant Archer (Gilgamesh), while attempting to break into his mansion.
3	3	"Fuyuki City"; Transliteration: "Fuyuki no Chi" (Japanese: 冬木の地)	Directed by : Kei Tsunematsu; Storyboarded by : Keiichi Sasajima	Tomonori Sudō & Atsushi Ikariya	October 15, 2011
Kirei announces his resignation from the war due to Assassin's elimination and is granted asylum by Risei. However, this is actually a ruse by Kirei, Risei and Tokiomi, as Assassin is not just one person, but several dozen people. With everyone else believing him out of the game, Kirei can send the Assassins to spy on them without suspicion. Waver informs Rider of Assassin's demise, but the latter is only interested in defeating President Clinton, acquiring his country's military weapons and having a good time. Irisviel and Saber arrive at Fuyuki City to meet up with Kiritsugu, but decide to tour the city since this is Irisviel's first time abroad. Meanwhile, Kiritsugu meets up with his assistant Maiya Hisau, who informs him that the other Masters believe Irisviel is Saber's Master and that she has smuggled in the guns they need for the war, including his Contender pistol. As Irisviel has a good time at the beach come nightfall, Saber detects another Servant at the harbor. Once there, they encounter Lancer (Diarmuid Ua Duibhne), who challenges Saber to a duel.
4	4	"Spearhead"; Transliteration: "Masō no Yaiba" (Japanese: 魔槍の刃)	Takashi Suhara	Keita Shimizu	October 22, 2011
Saber and Lancer fight, while complimenting each other on their skills and chivalry. At the same time, Kiritsugu and Maiya are scouting the battle, with Kiritsugu spotting Lancer's hidden Master. As he is about to snipe him, Kiritsugu spots Assassin, who is relaying the battle to Kirei and Tokiomi. Lancer's Master orders him to use his Noble Phantasms called Gae Dearg, the long red spear that cancels any magic, and Gae Buidhe, the short yellow spear that inflicts wounds that cannot be healed. From these, Saber recognizes Lancer's identity, while Lancer discovers Saber's identity after using Gae Dearg to temporarily dispel the invisibility spell on her sword Excalibur. Saber, whose left arm tendon was wounded by Lancer's Gae Buidhe, is about to give it her all when Waver and Rider, who were watching the battle from afar, suddenly ride down to the harbor on Rider's Gordius Wheel chariot, interrupting the battle.
5	5	"A Wicked Beast's Roar"; Transliteration: "Kyōjū Hōkō" (Japanese: 凶獣咆吼)	Tomonori Sudō	Tomonori Sudō & Atsushi Ikariya	October 29, 2011
Rider introduces himself to Saber and Lancer, asking them to join his army, but they both decline the offer. Kayneth reveals himself as Lancer's Master and mocks Waver, but Rider defends him. Soon after, Archer joins the battle against Berserker, Kariya's Servant, who uses a Noble Phantasm called For Someone's Glory, a black fog that envelops him and prevents all attempts at gauging his strength. Archer attacks Berserker with his Noble Phantasm called Gate of Babylon, transforming his sword into a key to unlock a special vault containing a vast number of weapons, but Berserker keeps evading and using Archer's weapons against him. To prevent Archer from exposing his Noble Phantasm further, Tokiomi expends a Command Seal to order him to withdraw from the battle, much to Archer's displeasure. Upon seeing Saber, Berserker attacks her, revealing his second Noble Phantasm called Knight of Owner, the ability to turn anything he wields into a Noble Phantasm. Lancer defends Saber out of chivalry, but Kayneth uses a Command Seal to force him to assist Berserker and kill Saber. However, Rider intervenes and incapacitates Berserker, who retreats, and warns Kayneth to withdraw, or else he will side with Saber and defeat Lancer. After Kayneth and a grateful Lancer retreat, Rider tells Saber he will not fight her or Lancer until their duel is finished. Elsewhere, Caster watches the battle through a crystal ball and thinks Saber is his long-lost love, while Kirei discovers that the church was being spied on by a familiar.
6	6	"A Night of Schemes"; Transliteration: "Bōryaku no Yoru" (Japanese: 謀略の夜)	Directed by : Takuya Nonaka; Storyboarded by : Keiichi Sasajima	Takayuki Mogi	November 5, 2011
Irisviel and Saber are driving to the Einzbern Castle when they encounter Caster, who believes Saber is Jeanne d'Arc, but Saber tells him he is mistaken and drives him away. Returning to his lair, Caster is convinced that "Jeanne" has lost her memories. At his hotel, Kayneth scolds Lancer for failing to kill Saber. Lancer is defended by Sola-Ui Nuada-Re Sophia-Ri, Kayneth's fiancee, who is maintaining Lancer's existence by supplying him with mana and has fallen for him due to the beauty mark under his right eye. When the hotel's occupants are ordered to evacuate due to possible arson, Kayneth realizes Saber's Master has come for them. After making sure all civilians have evacuated, Kiritsugu and Maiya blow up the hotel using explosives. Maiya is found by Kirei, but escapes thanks to Kiritsugu's smoke bomb. When the Assassins inform Kirei, Risei, and Tokiomi that Caster and Uryū have been kidnapping and sacrificing children, Risei is disgusted by their pointless murders and their jeopardizing the war's secrecy. In a meeting between Archer and Kirei, the former convinces the latter to spy on the other Masters and find out what drives them in order to discover his own desires.
7	7	"Dark Forest"; Transliteration: "Makyō no Mori" (Japanese: 魔境の森)	Takuya Nonaka	Takayuki Mogi	November 12, 2011
Risei informs all the active Masters that the war is to be put on hold until Caster, whose killings of children are attracting public attention, is destroyed, with an additional Command Seal as a reward. At the Einzbern Castle, Kiritsugu plans to use the hunt for Caster to attack the other Masters, despite Saber's protests that they should give priority to stopping Caster's atrocities. As Kiritsugu confides in Irisviel that he would rather escape with her and their daughter and live in peace somewhere, Irisviel detects Caster arriving from the forest with more children to be sacrificed and sends Saber after him. Saber is ambushed and cornered by Caster's Noble Phantasm called Prelati's Spellbook, which enables him to summon monsters, until Lancer appears and joins forces with her. As Irisviel and Maiya leave the castle, Kayneth, who had survived the hotel bombing thanks to his Volumen Hydragyrum, a giant magical blob of mercury, infiltrates the castle to duel Kiritsugu, who evades Kayneth by using his Calico M950 and launches a surprise attack with his Contender pistol.
8	8	"The Mage-Slayer"; Transliteration: "Majutsushi Koroshi" (Japanese: 魔術師殺し)	Directed by : Ei Aoki, Takuya Nonaka & Kei Tsunematsu; Storyboarded by : Ei Aoki	Takuro Takahashi, Atsushi Ikariya, Takayuki Mogi, Toshiyuki Shirai & Tomonori Sudō	November 19, 2011
Irisviel and Maiya are about to escape through the woods until Irisviel detects Kirei coming their way. Instead of evading him, Irisviel and Maiya decide to confront him in order to protect Kiritsugu. However, both of them are outmatched. Meanwhile, Kiritsugu is able to wound Kayneth with his Contender pistol. Believing the attack was a fluke, Kayneth decides to increase the defense of his Volumen Hydragyrum even further. Saber and Lancer continue fighting Caster's waves of demonic creatures, which prove limitless due to his Noble Phantasm, his grimoire. Saber manages to clear a path for Lancer, who pierces Caster's grimoire with Gae Dearg, cutting off his source of mana and instantly destroying his minions, causing him to flee. After hiding from an enraged and injured Kayneth, Kiritsugu finally appears and shoots him with his Contender again. Because the Contender uses special anti-magic bullets, Kayneth's Volumen Hydragyrum not only fails to protect him, but amplifies his injury significantly, causing him to fall unconscious in a pool of his own blood. Lancer arrives to save his unconscious Master, while Saber rushes to save Irisviel from Kirei. As Kirei chokes the life out of Irisviel while interrogating her about Kiritsugu, an Assassin informs him of Saber's approach, leading him to stab Irisviel before fleeing. Irisviel survives thanks to Saber's magical healing scabbard Avalon implanted inside her and goes on to heal Maiya.
9	9	"Master and Servant"; Transliteration: "Omo to Jūsha" (Japanese: 主と従者)	Takashi Suhara	Mitsuru Obunai	November 26, 2011
Kayneth wakes up with his body tied to a bed. Sola-Ui tells Kayneth that his Magic Circuits inside his body were destroyed by Kiritsugu's bullets and he can never use magic again. She offers to become Lancer's new Master, but realizing that it's because Sola-Ui has feelings for Lancer, Kayneth refuses. He eventually concedes after Sola-Ui begins to break his fingers in retaliation, and relinquishes Lancer's Command Seals to her. Despite Sola-Ui becoming his new Master, Lancer wishes to remain loyal to Kayneth, but Sola-Ui convinces him to keep fighting with her, using Kayneth's honor as a pretext. Kiritsugu decides to hunt Kayneth down despite Irisviel and Saber's wishes to stop Caster. Meanwhile, Waver and Rider manage to find Caster's lair, where they are horrified to see the mutilated bodies of his victims. Before setting Caster's lair on fire, Rider kills an Assassin targeting Waver and drives off two more. With Waver and Rider now knowing their secret, Tokiomi orders Kirei to send his Assassins to spy on them.
10	10	"Rin's Big Adventure"; Transliteration: "Rin no Bōken" (Japanese: 凛の冒険)	Directed by : Atsushi Ogasawara; Storyboarded by : Akira Hiyama	Shunya Kikuchi	December 3, 2011
This episode focuses on Rin, who is Tokiomi's daughter, and her involvement in the Fuyuki City Kidnappings. Despite her young age, Rin is determined to follow in her father's footsteps as a great mage. With the Holy Grail War starting soon, Tokiomi sends Aoi and Rin away for their own safety. At Rin's new school, several children, including her best friend Kotone, have been kidnapped by the Fuyuki Serial Killer, later revealed to be Uryū. Wishing to save Kotone, Rin heads to Fuyuki City alone. Using a mana detector gifted to her by her father, she eventually finds Uryū using a magic bracelet to hypnotize children. Rin follows Uryū to his hideout, where she is found by him. Rin overloads Uryū's bracelet with mana to destroy it, incapacitating him and freeing the children from his control. With everyone safe, Rin heads home only to be ambushed by one of Caster's monsters. However, Kariya comes to her rescue and later hands her to Aoi. Kirei, who had been spying on them through Assassin, orders his Servant to continue monitoring Kariya.
11	11	"Discussing the Grail"; Transliteration: "Seihai Mondō" (Japanese: 聖杯問答)	Dai Fukuyama	Keita Shimizu	December 10, 2011
Saber is surprised by the sudden arrival of Waver and Rider at the Einzbern Castle. Rider declares his intention to have a peaceful discussion with her and Archer on the subject of kingship and the wishes they want the Grail to grant. Archer wants it merely so that people can't "steal" it from him, while Rider wants it in order to be reincarnated and get his dream of world conquest. Saber argues that a king should serve his people selflessly and wishes to use the Grail's power to save Britain. Rider criticizes her, saying that Saber's emotional distance from her subjects led to their dissatisfaction and proposes his own ideal, namely that people should serve the king, whose extravagant ambitions inspire them in turn. Their talk is interrupted by the arrival of the Assassins. When they rebuff Rider's offer to join the feast, Rider summons his Noble Phantasm called Ionian Hetairoi, composed of the vast number of loyal soldiers who also became Servants after their deaths. Rider and his army easily decimate every single Assassin. With their meeting over, Rider tells Saber that he no longer recognizes her as a king and departs. A conflicted Saber reveals to Irisviel that one of her knights (Tristan) left Camelot because he was dissatisfied with her rule.
12	12	"The Grail Beckons"; Transliteration: "Seihai no Maneki" (Japanese: 聖杯の招き)	Ato Nonaka	Takayuki Mogi	December 17, 2011
Thanks to the information provided by the Assassins before their annihilation, Tokiomi and Kirei now know about Rider's Noble Phantasm and decide to let him attack the other Servants first before engaging him. While Maiya transports Irisviel and Saber to their new base of operations, Kiritsugu reviews his intel about the other participants' whereabouts. At their new base, Saber points out Irisviel's odd behavior, which forces her to admit that her powers have weakened. Archer questions Kirei about what he learned by spying on the other Masters and points out that Kirei has shown an unusual degree of interest in Kariya, despite the minimal threat he poses. From this, Archer concludes that Kirei enjoys seeing the pain and suffering of others. Though initially reluctant to acknowledge his dark nature, Kirei eventually gives in, at which point the Command Seals reappear on his hand, signifying that he is still meant to be a contestant. Since he currently has no Servant, however, Archer hints that he should kill another Master and take control of their Servant.
13	13	"The Forbidden Feast of Madness"; Transliteration: "Kindan no Kyōen" (Japanese: 禁断の狂宴)	Akihiko Uda	Atsushi Ikariya & Tomonori Sudō	December 24, 2011
Uryū and Caster return to their lair and are dismayed to see their "artwork" destroyed by Rider's fire. Uryū cheers Caster up by sharing his twisted view that God, whom Caster hates the most for Jeanne's death, is just a spectator who enjoys seeing humans do whatever they want. Impressed by his Master's beliefs, Caster plans a "grand spectacle" for God to look upon. Meanwhile, Waver has second thoughts about whether he is a worthy Master for Rider, but Rider encourages him to believe in himself. Suddenly, Waver, Rider, Irisviel and Saber sense magic from the Mion River. When they arrive, they witness Caster summoning a giant demonic monster. Rider informs the other contestants and they all agree on a temporary alliance to stop Caster before his monster destroys the city. With Rider leading the vanguard, Saber joins him to give Lancer an opening to use his spears on Caster.

=== Season 2 (2012) ===
No. overall	No. in season	Title	Directed by	Animation directed by	Original release date
14	1	"Bloody Battle on the Mion River"; Transliteration: "Miongawa Kessen" (Japanese: 未遠川血戦)	Kei Tsunematsu	Tomonori Sudō & Atsushi Ikariya	April 7, 2012
Saber – Artoria Pendragon, Lancer and Rider struggle to prevent the demon summoned by Caster from reaching the shore, as it regenerates at an astounding pace, making it difficult to destroy. Kirei Kotomine and Risei Kotomine discuss plans to cover up the incident. As Archer and Tokiomi Tohsaka watch the battle aboard Archer's aircraft named Vimana, Tokiomi pleads with Archer to assist in destroying Caster, but Archer refuses after "sacrificing" four of his weapons to damage the beast. A pair of Mitsubishi F-15J Jets are caught in the battle while patrolling the area. One of them is consumed by Caster's demon, while the other is hijacked by Berserker, who engages in aerial combat with Archer. A crowd of bystanders begins to gather along the riverbank to witness the battle. Kariya Matou confronts Tokiomi over his treatment of Sakura, and is enraged when Tokiomi simply dismisses him by saying he wanted both of his daughters to become mages, instead of being a part of the "common masses". Ryūnosuke Uryū, watching from the riverbank, is sniped by Kiritsugu Emiya and dies. Caster senses the death of his Master and vows to fulfill the promise he made to him. Kiritsugu deduces that Caster's demon is an immortal being that will regenerate itself if even a small piece of it is left, and that Saber is the only Servant with a Noble Phantasm strong enough to destroy it.
15	2	"Golden Light"; Transliteration: "Ōgon no Kagayaki" (Japanese: 黄金の輝き)	Directed by : Takahiro Miura; Storyboarded by : Keiichi Sasajima	Tomonori Sudō & Atsushi Ikariya	April 14, 2012
As Archer and Berserker continue to battle in the sky, Saber and Rider are forced to retreat from Caster's demon to rethink their strategy. Rider proposes to transport the demon inside of Ionian Hetairoi, where his armies will hold it off as long as they can while Saber and Lancer find a way to finally destroy it. Kiritsugu calls and explains to Waver Velvet how they will defeat the demon and tells him to inform Lancer about Saber's Noble Phantasm. Lancer realizes what Kiritsugu means and destroys his Gae Buidhe to allow Saber's wound to heal and fully use her Noble Phantasm. Tokiomi defeats Kariya by burning him with a blast of fire and causing him to fall from the building, but Kirei later finds Kariya and decides to heal him. Berserker destroys Archer's Vimana, but is drawn by the unveiling of Saber's sword and begins attacking her instead. Lancer and Archer attack Berserker and destroy his jet. With the coast clear, Kiritsugu fires a flare gun to signal to Waver where Rider should transport the demon. With the demon in position, Saber uses Excalibur to finally destroy the demon along with Caster, who has a vision of Jeanne before his death. With the threat over, Rider and Archer discuss whether Saber's life as king was incredible or tragic before both leave, with Rider hoping to duel Archer in the future and Archer now smitten with Saber.
16	3	"The End of Honor"; Transliteration: "Eiyo no Hate" (Japanese: 栄誉の果て)	Takashi Suhara	Toshiyuki Shirai	April 21, 2012
Kayneth El-Melloi Archibald visits Risei and asks for his reward for Lancer's role in defeating Caster. Risei agrees to reward Kayneth with a Command Seal, but after receiving it, Kayneth immediately shoots and kills Risei to ensure that no other Masters can get one. During the battle at the Mion River, Maiya Hisau finds Sola-Ui Nuada-Re Sophia-Ri and cuts off her Command Seal-bearing arm before kidnapping her. Kayneth scolds Lancer for not protecting Sola-Ui and mocks him. Saber and Irisviel von Einzbern, tipped off by Kiritsugu, arrive at Kayneth's hideout, where Saber and Lancer decide the time is right to finish their duel. Kiritsugu confronts Kayneth and, holding Sola-Ui at gunpoint, gives Kayneth a contract of geis that will prevent Kiritsugu from killing him and Sola-Ui if he uses his last Command Seal to force Lancer to commit suicide. Desperate, Kayneth agrees to the deal, causing Lancer to curse everyone around him (Kayneth and Sola-Ui in particular) before he dies, impaled on his own lance. However, since the contract only binds Kiritsugu from harming them personally, Maiya immediately shoots Kayneth and Sola-Ui, killing the latter. As Saber ends Kayneth's suffering, she confronts Kiritsugu for the terrible and dishonorable things he would do to win the Grail. Kiritsugu counters that there is nothing honorable about chivalry, as all war is hell, and he will do anything, including great evil, to fulfill his wish to save the world. As Kiritsugu leaves with Maiya, Irisviel collapses from exhaustion.
17	4	"The Eighth Contract"; Transliteration: "Dai-hachi no Keiyaku" (Japanese: 第八の契約)	Takuya Nonaka	Takayuki Mogi	April 28, 2012
After Tokiomi hears from Kirei about Risei's unexpected death, he proposes forming a new strategy. Archer believes that Kirei is furious upon missing his chance to be the one to murder his own father. Irisviel and Saber, being informed by Maiya, head to the church to discuss with Tokiomi his proposal to form an alliance. Tokiomi visits his daughter Rin, giving her a magecraft book and some wisdom before going to the church. During the meeting, Tokiomi suggests a temporary alliance to defeat the other Masters first. Irisviel agrees only to a temporary truce, provided that Tokiomi complies to having Kirei leave the country and be no longer involved in the war. As they depart, Irisviel reveals to Maiya that she is the embodiment of the Holy Grail in human form and will soon die to create the Grail near the end of the war. Maiya promises to protect her until that time comes. Meanwhile, Kirei reveals to Archer that his father's dying act was to leave Kirei the remaining Command Seals, restoring Kirei's ability to contract with a Servant. The secret reason behind the war is that the Holy Grail can be activated only if all seven Servants are sacrificed. Tokiomi has been reluctant to use his Command Seals, as he needs at least one to force Archer to commit suicide. Furthermore, Kirei still wants to explore his dark desires, and Archer yearns for a more stimulating Master. Later, Kirei meets with Tokiomi, who entrusts him with the guardianship of Rin should anything happen to him and an Azoth dagger as a symbol of his completed apprenticeship. Kirei stabs Tokiomi in the back with the dagger, saying even his own father and master never really understood him. With Tokiomi dead, Kirei and Archer form a new contract as Master and Servant.
18	5	"Distant Memories"; Transliteration: "Tōi Kioku" (Japanese: 遠い記憶)	Takashi Suhara	Shunya Kikuchi	May 5, 2012
When Kiritsugu was a child, he lived on Alimango Island in the Philippines with his father Noritaka Emiya and his father's assistant, a local girl named Shirley whom Kiritsugu was smitten with. Noritaka conducted research on immortality using plants, which had Shirley convinced that this would one day change the world, as she hoped that Kiritsugu would follow in his father's footsteps. Before leaving one morning, Noritaka tells Kiritsugu to stay in the house, after the former believes that someone went into his lab the previous night. However, Kiritsugu went out to search for Shirley instead, only to find her at her house in a frenzy, devouring live chickens. Shirley revealed that she went into the lab and used the immortality formula on herself so that people could appreciate Noritaka, which turned her into a Dead Apostle, a vampire caused by magecraft. Shirley asked Kiritsugu to kill her before she could infect others, but unable to do it, he instead fled to alert the Church, allowing her to infect the entire village. As chaos spread across the island, the Church Executors and the Mage's Association Enforcers arrived to stop the outbreak and cover up the incident. Kiritsugu was saved by a mercenary named Natalia Kaminski, whose mission was to eliminate the mage responsible for the outbreak. Kiritsugu confronted Noritaka over his work and its consequences, but the latter simply shrugged them off as an accident and planned to continue his experiments elsewhere, leading Kiritsugu to kill his own father as a result. Emotionally broken and with nowhere to go, Kiritsugu agreed to escape with Natalia, his ideologies having taken shape.
19	6	"Where Justice Dwells"; Transliteration: "Seigi no Arika" (Japanese: 正義の在処)	Takahiro Miura	Keita Shimizu & Takahiro Miura	May 12, 2012
After leaving the island, Kiritsugu began living with Natalia, who trained him to become a mercenary like her and they traveled around the world on various missions for several years. Due to his unique magic, Natalia removed several of Kiritsugu's ribs and uses them to create sixty-six magic bullets (called Origin Rounds) that have a devastating effect against mages. Later on, Natalia and Kiritsugu were assigned to kill Odd Vorzak, a Dead Apostle mage who controls bee familiars that turn their victims into Ghouls. While Natalia boarded the plane that Vorzak had been taking from Paris, Kiritsugu headed to the destination in New York to kill the mage's associate there. Both Natalia and Kiritsugu successfully eliminated their targets. However, Vorzak was concealing bees in his body, which turned all the passengers and flight crew into Ghouls, forcing Natalia to secure herself in the cockpit and await for Kiritsugu to carry out his plan. As her plane drew closer to New York, Natalia and Kiritsugu talked via radio, reminiscing about the time they spent together and the bond they shared. When her plane was in view, Kiritsugu used a Type 91 MANPADS to blow up the plane in order to prevent a citywide infestation. Before he pulled the trigger, he told her he was glad to have her as his mother. Kiritsugu then collapsed in grief over losing another loved one.
20	7	"The Assassin Returns"; Transliteration: "Ansatsusha no Kikan" (Japanese: 暗殺者の帰還)	Directed by : Ato Nonaka; Storyboarded by : Keiichi Sasajima	Shizuka Fujisaki & Atsushi Ikariya	May 19, 2012
Back in the present day, Kiritsugu visits an ailing Irisviel in the storehouse. She gives her husband the scabbard Avalon and asks him to bring their daughter Illya to see Japan once the War is over. Learning from Maiya that Saber has gone to battle Rider, Kiritsugu assigns Maiya to protect his wife while he goes to assassinate Tokiomi. Meanwhile, Waver heads to the forest where he summoned Rider in order to replenish his mana before Rider's intended fight with Saber, whom he wishes to battle to set her straight on what it means to be a king. Kariya has a nightmare in which Berserker speaks to him before awakening chained in the cellar of the Matou house. To heal Kariya, Zouken Matou forces him to swallow the crest worm that first tasted Sakura's purity. Irisviel talks with Maiya about the latter's past as a child soldier and implores her to live her own life after the war. She then tells Maiya of her wish that this war will be the last so that Illya can live a normal life. At the same time, Kiritsugu arrives at the Tohsaka mansion, only to discover that Tokiomi is dead. In the interval, Rider attacks Irisviel and Maiya. Kiritsugu uses a Command Seal to order Saber to return to the storehouse, where she finds Maiya injured and Irisviel abducted by Rider, prompting her to give chase on her motorcycle. On reaching the storehouse, Kiritsugu finds the dying Maiya and comforts her in her last moments through his own tears.
21	8	"Knight on a Two-Wheeled Steed"; Transliteration: "Sōrin no Kishi" (Japanese: 双輪の騎士)	Directed by : Akihiko Uda; Storyboarded by : Ei Aoki	Takuro Takahashi & Toshiyuki Shirai	May 26, 2012
As Saber chases Rider through the city on her motorcycle, eventually catching up to Waver and Rider and realizing Irisviel is not with them. Meanwhile, Kiritsugu investigates that Rider is not responsible for attacking Irisviel and Maiya, leading him to conclude that Kariya was behind his wife's kidnapping. He tortures Kariya's brother Byakuya concerning Kariya's whereabouts. Kariya is revealed to be working with Kirei, who made a deal with Kariya to kidnap Irisviel using Berserker's For Someone's Glory, in order to disguise himself as Rider, in return for the restoration of the two Command Seals he consumed and the promise of a duel with Tokiomi at the church. When Kariya leaves, Kirei orders Zouken to come out of hiding, and Zouken remarks how Kirei relates to his enjoyment of watching Kariya suffer, but Kirei drives him away. Saber later has a duel with Rider and destroys Rider's Gordius Wheel before departing. Kariya arrives at the church only to find Tokiomi's corpse, but Aoi Tohsaka arrives at the church soon after and assumes Kariya to be her husband's killer. Kariya attempts to explain the situation and places blame on Tokiomi for his treatment of her and Sakura, but Aoi reprimands him for misunderstanding her and showing no love to anyone. Kariya snaps and strangles Aoi in a mental breakdown. By the time he comes to his senses, she is lying motionless on the floor. As Kariya stumbles out of the church in despair, Archer and Kirei are shown to have been watching from the balcony, enjoying the tragedy as it unfolded.
22	9	"All the Evil in the World"; Transliteration: "Konoyo Subete no Aku" (Japanese: この世全ての悪)	Directed by : Takuya Nonaka; Storyboarded by : Fumie Muroi	Takayuki Mogi	June 2, 2012
Waver returns home to the Mackenzie household, and is greeted by Glen Mackenzie, who Waver put under a spell, along with Martha Mackenzie, to make them believe he was their grandson. However, Glen notes that he and Martha are aware that Waver is not related to them, but still enjoyed his and Rider's company. In Caster's lair, Irisviel is interrogated by Kirei, who believes he is like Kiritsugu, but Irisviel states that an empty man like Kirei has nothing in common with Kiritsugu. Agitated, Kirei grabs her throat, demanding what Kiritsugu's wish for the Grail was before letting go. Irisviel responds that Kiritsugu's wish is for eternal world peace. Disappointed, Kirei strangles Irisviel again until her neck is crushed with a loud snap, killing her, and vows to destroy Kiritsugu's dream. Later that night, Waver and Rider see magical flares sent up near the theater, meant to lure them into a duel with Archer. As Rider summons his horse Bucephalus, Waver decides to use all of his Command Seals to give Rider the power he needs to win and conquer the world, as he feels he is no longer worthy of being his Master. Instead, Rider tells Waver he considers him a friend and wants him to ride with him into battle. Kiritsugu and Saber see the flares as well, aware they are a trap meant to gather the remaining Masters and Servants in the same area. Having sent out the flares, Kirei prepares for his fight with Kiritsugu, sending Berserker to deal with Saber and Archer to face off with Rider. Meanwhile, Irisviel's soul makes contact with the spirit within the Grail, Angra Mainyu, before disappearing.
23	10	"The Ocean at the End of the World"; Transliteration: "Saihate no Umi" (Japanese: 最果ての海)	Kei Tsunematsu	Atsushi Ikariya & Tomonori Sudō	June 9, 2012
As Kiritsugu and Saber arrive at the theater on separate paths, Saber is attacked by a gun-wielding Berserker in the underground parking lot. Meanwhile, Waver and Rider encounter Archer on the bridge. As they share a final toast before their duel, Rider asks Archer to join forces with him and conquer the world and beyond, but Archer politely declines. Saber manages to destroy Berserker's gun, but is startled to find he knows the exact length of her cloaked sword. She is shocked and devastated when Berserker's true identity is revealed to be Sir Lancelot, one of her most trusted knights. At the same time, a dying Kariya begins hallucinating due to his guilt over strangling Aoi. Rider summons Ionian Hetairoi and charges at Archer, but Archer pulls out his sword Ea and uses his Noble Phantasm called Enuma Elish, which causes a massive rip in space-time, destroying Ionian Hetairoi and sending them back into the real world. After Waver agrees to be Rider's retainer, Rider removes Waver from his horse and orders him to live on and pass down the tale of his final battle. Archer kills Rider with Ea and states that he respects Rider as his equal before the latter passes away. In admiration of his loyalty to Rider, Archer spares Waver's life and departs, leaving Waver in mourning. Kiritsugu finally meets Kirei, who has laid out his wife's body on the theater's stage.
24	11	"The Final Command Spell"; Transliteration: "Saigo no Reijū" (Japanese: 最後の令呪)	Ei Aoki	Shunya Kikuchi, Keita Shimizu, Toshiyuki Shirai, Shizuka Fujisaki, Tomonori Sudō & Atsushi Ikariya	June 16, 2012
As Kiritsugu and Kirei engage in an intense duel, Saber shares a last conversation with Berserker before he dies by her hand. As Kiritsugu and Kirei both prepare to deliver the finishing blow to the other, a black ooze pouring from the Grail crashes through the ceiling and covers them. Kiritsugu finds himself in an illusory world where Angra Mainyu, taking the form of Irisviel, tells him he is worthy of using it to make a wish, making Kiritsugu the winner of the war. However, Kiritsugu is shocked to find that the Grail has been corrupted, and watches it deconstruct his belief in killing the few for the sake of the many and being told no one can "save the world" and end conflict without killing off all of humanity. Angra Mainyu attempts to convince Kiritsugu to make his wish by assuming the forms of both Irisviel and Illya and promising he will be together with them again at the cost of everyone else. However, Kiritsugu rejects the Grail, shooting the illusion of his daughter and beginning to strangle his illusory wife, declaring he will not sacrifice the rest of humanity for the sake of his personal happiness, and realizing that the Grail has been corrupted and now seeks only to turn victors' wishes into global genocide. He is cursed by Angra Mainyu under the form of Irisviel, shortening his lifespan, as he continues strangling her until her neck is loudly crushed. Back outside, Kirei scolds Kiritsugu for refusing the Grail and wasting the wish. Kirei pleads with Kiritsugu to give the wish to him so that he may find the meaning of his existence, but Kiritsugu shoots him. Saber soon arrives at the Grail's stage and encounters Archer, who demands that she surrender and devote herself to him as his wife. Kiritsugu appears in the middle of their exchange and, to the horror of both Servants, uses his two remaining Command Seals to force Saber to destroy the Holy Grail with Excalibur.
25	12	"Fate/Zero"	Directed by : Ei Aoki, Kei Tsunematsu & Takuya Nonaka; Storyboarded by : Ei Aoki	Tomonori Sudō & Atsushi Ikariya	June 23, 2012
The theater is demolished after Saber destroys the Grail, but Kiritsugu is shocked to see the Grail's black ooze pour down from the sky and flood the city, destroying everything it touches and engulfing Archer. Kariya is seen leaving his basement to finally reunite Sakura with Rin, but in reality, he collapses down the stairs and is consumed by the crest worms below, leading Sakura to accept her fate. Kirei awakens to see that the Grail has resurrected him and granted Archer a mortal body. Seeing that his wish of destruction and tragedy has come true, Kirei laughs hysterically at his own lack of humanity, but he seeks to fully understand his desire, and Archer agrees to follow him. In the aftermath of the destruction of the Grail, Kirei briefly notices Kiritsugu desperately searching for survivors in the burning rubble, and becoming overjoyed to find a young boy named Shirou still alive. The next day, Waver asks Glen and Martha to let him stay with them a while longer as he earns money to travel around the world and find his own path. After presiding over Tokiomi's funeral, Kirei meets Rin and her mother Aoi, who has survived but suffered severe brain damage and does not comprehend that her husband is dead and Sakura is gone. Kirei gives Rin the Azoth dagger and relishes in her grief. Saber, having become a Heroic Spirit again, relives her final moments on the battlefield during her life and remembers Lancelot's final words to her as he expressed his regret over having betrayed her and falling in love with Guinevere. Saber grieves that she does not understand anyone and weeps for having seemingly failed as a king, promising to win the Holy Grail in the next war for their sake. A voiceover by Kiritsugu reveals that he attempted to return to the Einzberns many times, but Jubstacheit von Einzbern, the head of the family, refused to open the forest's barrier since Kiritsugu did not return with the Grail, and thus he never saw Illya again. Instead, he decides to live in Fuyuki City and adopt Shirou. Five years later, Kiritsugu tells Shirou one summer night how he once wished to be a hero. Shirou promises his father that he will fulfill that dream for him, and Kiritsugu, due to the Grail's influence, quietly passes away, reminiscing about the time when Shirley asked him what he wanted to grow up to be and concluding that he still wants to be a hero.

== Home media release ==
=== Japanese ===
Aniplex (Japan – Region 2/A)
Volume		Episodes	Release date	Ref.
Season 1	1	1	December 21, 2011	
Season 1	2	2–4	January 25, 2012	
