= Sakura Matou =

Fictional character in the Fate series

- Fate character
- First appearance: Fate/stay night (2004)
- Created by: Kinoko Nasu
- Designed by: Takashi Takeuchi
- Voiced by: English: Sherry Lynn (Fate/stay night and Unlimited Blade Works movie) Cristina Vee (Fate/Zero onwards); Japanese: Noriko Shitaya

In-universe information
- Relatives: Rin Tohsaka (biological sister)

Sakura Tohsaka (Japanese: 遠坂さくら, Hepburn: Tōsaka Sakura), often known as Sakura Matou (間桐 桜, Matō Sakura), is a fictional character that was first introduced in Type-Moon's visual novel game Fate/stay night (2004). She is introduced as a friend of Shirou Emiya, on whom she has a crush but remains a minor character in the first two routes of the novel. In the third route Heaven's Feel, where she serves as the route's heroine, Sakura reveals her darker characterization and bonds with Shirou. Sakura is a participant of the Holy Grail War, a battle between mages who fight alongside warriors known as Servants. She is corrupted through a mysterious shadow and Shirou must decide whether or not he should kill her. Besides Fate/stay night, Sakura has appeared in the sequel Fate/hollow ataraxia, the prequel light novel Fate/Zero and multiple spin-offs and adaptations of Type-Moon works.

Sakura was created by Kinoko Nasu, who wanted to create a heroine who would contrast with the previous heroine Rin Tohsaka, while character designer Takashi Takeuchi wanted her to be a beautiful, popular teenager. The staff members of studio Ufotable in charge of creating the Heaven's Feel films wanted to expand on her characterization by creating new scenes in which she interacts with Shirou after their first meeting. Sakura is voiced by Noriko Shitaya in Japanese. In English, she is voiced by Sherry Lynn in the anime adaptations by Studio DEEN, and by Cristina Vee from Fate/Zero onwards.

Critical reception to Sakura's character has been generally positive; critics praised the complexity and depth to the character in the Heaven's Feel route as well as her connections with Shirou and her adoptive brother Shinji Matou. Her dark past, in which she experienced physical and sexual abuse, however, received a mixed reception. Sakura is also often used for marketing and has appeared in several character-popularity polls.

== Creation and conception ==
Sakura Matou was conceived by Japanese artist Takashi Takeuchi during the early stages of making the visual novel Fate/stay night. Takeuchi wanted to create an "attractive" heroine with a quiet personality who would be popular with the audience. He considered Sakura to be a typical eroge heroine; more scenes of erotic content were created for her compared to the game's other female characters. The game's creators considered her as a woman who loves sex, and the player's perception of her is supposed to be that of a bride before the wedding. Writer Kinoko Nasu wanted Sakura to contrast with Rin Tohsaka, the heroine of another route in the visual novel, based on their different pasts. During the story Sakura is corrupted by a shadow, which Takeuchi designed for this incarnation. The idea of Dark Sakura was created; a character who would frighten players because of her darker tone. Nasu liked Takeuchi's design. Sakura's initial concept was based on Fujino Asagami from Kara no Kyoukai, which Nasu accepted when Takeuchi first showed him the sketches. In the following game, Sakura was reworked to have a lighter-hearted personality that contrasts with her dark past.

According to Type Moon, Sakura is their most popular heroine despite her tragic nature. While making Fate/Zero, the staff favored showing more of her suffering, most notably when Kariya tries to save her, but some scenes were removed from the light novel because of the nature of the content. Nasu said he enjoyed Sakura's Japanese portrayal by Noriko Shitaya, who made her sound appealing.

For Ufotable's film based on Heaven's Feel, director Tomonori Sudo said he wanted to further explore the past relationship between Shirou and Sakura, which he believes is the most important part of the story. Producer Yuma Takahashi had similar opinions, believing the style of some scenes that symbolize their romance were needed. Singer Aimer wrote the theme song "Hana no Uta", which focuses on Sakura. Having not known of the character before the making of the film, Shitaya was surprised when learning of Sakura's characterization as she discovered new traits about her. Aimer's theme song "I beg you" was written to explore the relationship between these characters; Aimer wanted to show Sakura's dark personality because she wants Shirou to love her but does not want him to know about her secrets. The author of the printed adaptation of Heaven's Feel noted that for the serialization of the manga he wanted to start the story between Shirou and Sakura with the first time the latter met the former and fell for him in contrast to the original visual novel which left this scene until some scenes more in the route.

Shitaya enjoyed Shirou's noticing of Sakura's feelings. Shitaya enjoyed the exploration of Sakura's feelings towards Shirou, which she said brought a new level of depth to the character. English voice actress Cristina Vee said that in preparation for the dub of the film that Sakura is "very quiet and meek, so she's going to be very scary".

== Appearances ==
Sakura is introduced in visual novel Fate/stay night as a first-year high-school student and the sister of Shinji Matou, a friend of the story's protagonist Shirou Emiya. After Shirou's father Kiritsugu dies, Sakura often visits Shirou's home to help him with his daily chores. Though Shinji is from a family of sorcerers, Sakura has no knowledge of her family's craft and history. Sakura is outwardly shy and has a long-standing and obvious crush on Shirou. Sakura plays a minor part in the Fate and Unlimited Blade Works routes. In the Heaven's Feel route, however, she is the story's lead heroine and her backstory is vastly expanded. In the anime-original storyline, Sakura is kidnapped by Caster as a sacrifice to summon the Holy Grail because she has latent magic circuits. During a rescue attempt, she and Rin are confirmed to be sisters who were separated in early childhood. Sakura is proven to be a powerful mage as well as Rider's true Master, having used a command spell to give control to Shinji because she had no desire to fight. Her brand of magic is unique; she cannot command any of the five traditional elements but can manipulate the very rare Imaginary Numbers, which are connected to demons.

In Heaven's Feel it is revealed that Sakura underwent years of torture and sexual abuse by Shinji and her grandfather Zōken Matō that have left her psychologically scarred and emotionally dependent on Shirou. At the end of the previous Grail War, Zōken implanted a piece of the Grail into Sakura in an attempt to recreate it, turning her into the Black Grail, the counterpart to Einzbern's White Grail. This leads a Servant from the Third Holy Grail War Angra Mainyu (also known as Avenger) to manifest itself through Sakura as "The Shadow" while she is asleep. Consequently, Sakura takes on the form of the Shadow at night, which kills hundreds of people to gain energy. As a result of the combined machinations of Zōken and magus priest Kirei Kotomine, she gradually sinks into depravity before embracing the Shadow to become the bloodthirsty Dark Sakura. Torn between her usual self and being fully consumed by her long-repressed feelings of rage and envy, Sakura initially intends to sacrifice herself in order to stop Angra Mainyu, but proceeds to seek vengeance upon the world by unleashing Angra Mainyu upon humanity after her biological sister Rin, from whom she was separated after being adopted into the Matou family, expresses her desire to kill her. She is stopped, however, when in their ensuing battle, Rin finds she cannot kill her sister and lets herself be stabbed before revealing to Sakura that she never stopped caring for her. Realizing her folly, Sakura regains control of her mind for long enough for Shirou to free her of the Shadow. In her route's Normal End, Sakura goes insane from Shirou's sacrifice during the Grail's destruction and lives alone in the Emiya household for the rest of her life, believing Shirou will return to her to take her to see the cherry blossoms. When Sakura dies, she sees Shirou waving to her in a final dream or afterlife. In the True End, Sakura lives with Shirō and Rider in peace, realizing for the first time she is truly happy.

Sakura also appears in the prequel light novel Fate/Zero as a child; Kariya Matou seeks to save her from the Matou family but fails. She is also present in Fate/hollow ataraxia. Sakura, while retaining her reticent nature throughout the game, becomes more self-confident and self-sufficient both as a mage and as a leader. She has become the captain of her school's archery club, which she leads with great skill under the tutelage of Ayako Mitsuzuri. Sakura now stays at the Emiya residence on weekends, holidays and special occasions; she also becomes the head of the Matou household, having ousted Zouken. Sakura continues to help Shirou with the cooking and housework at the Emiya household. She and Rin become sisters; Rin educates her in cooking and magecraft. Sakura maintains slight resentment and an inferiority complex towards Rin, and displays jealousy towards other women when Shirou pays them attention. Sakura's evil and sadistic side from the Heaven's Feel route of Fate/stay night manifests occasionally as comic relief in the game.

In the manga and anime series Fate/kaleid liner Prisma Illya 3rei!! Sakura appears as doll that is mind-controlled by the Ainsworths family. She is used to wound Shirou during a fight controlled by Julia Ainsworths. Once Shirou recovers, he tells the other characters about Sakura's past, which is also told in the movie prequel Fate/kaleid liner Prisma Illya: Oath Under Snow. In this spin-off, Sakura practices archery with Shirou. When the Fifth Holy Grail War starts, Sakura is outed as a fighter using the Gilgamesh class card to kill Shirou. She refuses to kill Shirou, however, and is instead killed by Shinji when his brother appears to take her place.

Sakura appears in the fighting games Fate/unlimited codes and Fate/tiger colosseum. In Fate/Grand Order, she appears as a Lancer (ランサー, Ransā)-class servant whose spirit Parvati (パールヴァティー, Pāruvatī) is possessing her body. She also appears in Fate/Extra, playing a more significant role in its side-story sequel Fate/Extra CCC, where she also receives a lookalike character called BB.

Besides Type-Moon's works and adaptations, she also appears in the video game Divine Gate.

== Reception ==
Sakura's darker counterpart had received praise for her tragic nature and redesign.

Sakura was well received by fans of the series. In the Type Moon 10th anniversary poll, Sakura was voted as the eighth-best character. In a Newtype poll, Sakura was voted the 19th-most-popular female anime character from the 2010s. In the 2017 Newtype anime award for best female character, Sakura took fifth place for her role in Presage Flower. She was also voted the second best female character of Newtype 2019 for her role in Lost Butterfly. Writer Gen Urobuchi praised Sakura's role in Heaven's Feel because the character represents a darker side of women but Shirou still accepts her.

Scenes from the original visual novel that show Shirou having sexual intercourse with the heroines are commonly censored. According to the website Kotaku, Shirou's intercourse with Sakura has become an Internet meme that replaced Sakura's nudity with multiple images. In promoting the Heaven's Feel film trilogy, a collaboration cafe titled "Fate/stay night Heaven’s Feel Sakura Cafe", where recording of Sakura's voice could be heard, was opened in 2017 in Osaka and Tokyo. Rice Digital claimed the sexual scenes were given a deep theme, most notably in Heaven's Feel when the heroine, Sakura, is treated differently due to her backstory, which makes her unease.

Voice actor Bryce Papenbrook who voices Shirou in English, told Crunchyroll he looked forward to Shirou's role in the Heaven's Feel movie because of Shirou's and Sakura's relationship. Swedish visual arts magazine The Artifice had enjoyed Sakura's character and backstory.

Critics have commented on Sakura's role in the Heaven's Feel movies. Kim Morrissy of Anime News Network enjoyed the interactions between Sakura and Shirou in the first Heaven's Feel movie. Rebecca Silverman from the same website praised "Sakura's slow growth into someone who can express her feelings" due to Shirou's help and also enjoyed their relationship, stating that both "Sakura and Shirou's growth feels more subtle than previous Fate entries". IGN noted that Sakura's story with Shirou was different from other adaptations of the visual novel. Chris Beveridge from the Fandom Post enjoyed multiple interactions between Sakura and Shirou and at the same time with Saber. Atomix noted that multiple fans wondered whether or not the sexual content from the visual novel involving Sakura would be adapted but the reviewer noted Ufotable did not show any fanservice. Atomix criticized how Sakura lacked importance in the first Heaven's Feel movie despite being its heroine. UK Anime Network questioned the connection between Sakura and Rin, and criticized that this remains as a mystery in the first film. Anime News Network noted that Sakura has one of the harshest family origins in anime because she was given up by the Tohsaka family and subsequently tortured by her adopted grandfather Zouken Matou in order to get the power to participate in the Holy Grail War.

Kim Morrissy said lost butterfly, the second film in the series, is "a story about Shirou and Sakura and how their choices affect the entire war", that their compelling relationship is more complex than a childhood friendship, and that "their chemistry in this film felt raw and more profound than any of Shirou's interactions with his other love interests". Rebecca Silverman commended the film for exploring into Sakura's hidden depths and psychological state and found her descent into darkness beautiful and understandable. Rebecca also praised "Sakura's Disney-inspired dream sequence" to which she called "fascinating on several levels". Skyler Allen praised Sakura's hidden depths in the second movie because of the revelation of her difficult childhood while wondering whether her relationship with Shirou is healthy. Because both characters endured tragic events, Sakura and Shirou mature during the second film and try comforting each other. The way the film touches on Sakura's past sexual assaults would make the viewer uncomfortable due to the way it is handled because Sakura feels shame about her rape. Nevertheless, the reviewer felt Sakura's gradual collapse into a tragic heroine was developed appropriately. IGN felt that Sakura's personality was one of the best parts of the second film due to how she suffers a darker characterization despite retaining her original wellmeaning self. Biggest In Japan said that the second Heaven's Feel makes a major impact in Shirou and Sakura's relationship to the point the former's character arc "comes full circle". As the story makes Sakura the biggest enemy in the narrative who wants to be killed by the person she loves the most, Shirou becomes conflicted between his feelings for her and whether or not he can save her until giving up on being a hero and allowing her live. The final Heaven's Feel movie received praise for Sakura's new redesign labeled as "Dark Sakura" due to its appeal created by Ufotable which was compared to Saber Alter. While critics enjoyed Shirou's quest to save Sakura from herself to the point of making the redemption quest worthwhile, the sister relationship she has with Rin Tohsaka was similarly received due to further expanding the quest of redemption.
