= Emiya =

Emiya is a surname, and may refer to one of the following fictional characters:

- Shirō Emiya from Fate/stay night
- Archer from Fate/stay Night
- Kiritsugu Emiya from Fate/Zero
