= Kirei Kotomine =

Fictional character from Fate franchise

- Fate character
- Kirei as depicted in Fate/Stay Night
- First appearance: Fate/Stay Night (2004)
- Created by: Kinoko Nasu
- Designed by: Takashi Takeuchi
- Voiced by: EN: Crispin Freeman; JA: Jouji Nakata

Kirei Kotomine (Japanese: 言峰 綺礼, Hepburn: Kotomine Kirei) is a fictional character and the main antagonist of Fate, a dark fantasy series created by the Japanese developer and publisher Type-Moon. He was introduced in Fate/Stay Night as the appointed overseer of the 5th Holy Grail War and later appears as a participant in the 4th Holy Grail War in the prequel Fate/Zero.

He was conceived by Kinoko Nasu as the overarching antagonist of the Fate franchise. His character was well received by video game publications, several of which had praised his relationship with Kiritsugu Emiya and his role as an antagonistic force.

== Creation and conception ==
In an interview with Alain Mendez and Mitsuru Uehira of Anime News Network, Japanese writer Gen Urobuchi had stated that Kirei's height in the original Fate/Stay Night visual novel was revised for Fate/Zero. Urobuchi regarded Kirei as the "last boss" of Fate/Stay Night. While Nasu had said that his strength came from his tenacity and numerous Command Seals. Urobuchi expressed that he got a headache from trying to come up with ideas for Kirei in the final climactic battle between him and Kiritsugu. He also explained that he had difficulties when writing about Kirei's Bajiquan. In Japanese, Kirei was voiced by the Japanese voice actor Jouji Nakata, while in the series' English dub, Kirei was voiced by Crispin Freeman. In an interview, Nakata noted that the scene in Fate/Stay Night: Heaven's Feel I. presage flower where Kirei ate mapo tofu at a Chinese restaurant "had an impact on fans of the original work" who "loved" the character.

== Appearances ==
=== Fate series ===
In Fate/Stay Night, Kirei Kotomine is introduced as a priest ostensibly acting as the impartial overseer of the "Holy Grail War", a battle royale among 7 participating mages (a.k.a. "Masters") who have harnessed the power of supernatural beings called "Servants". Due to his experience as an elite assassin for the Church, Kirei is an expert practitioner in Chinese martial arts whose proficiency is magnified by his immense physical strength and numerous Command Seals. He ultimately emerges as one of the series' main antagonists upon revealing he organized the present Grail War to manipulate its competing Masters into supplying Angra Mainyu, the destructive entity inside the "Holy Grail", with enough energy to be unleashed on humanity.

==== Fate/Zero ====
At the time of his birth, Kirei Kotomine possessed Magical Circuits despite being of non-magus descent. While possessing a strong moral compass, Kirei discovered early in his youth that he could only experience joy through others' suffering. During the events of Fate/Zero, Kirei apprenticed himself to Tokiomi Tōsaka at his father's behest in order to secretly serve as his spy and ally against the other Masters in the Fourth Holy Grail War based in Fuyuki. Over the course of the war, he became obsessed with another Master, Kiritsugu Emiya, whom he grew to despise for taking his own humanity for granted and consciously suppressing it in pursuit of lofty ideals. After murdering Tokiomi and forming a contract with his "Archer" Servant, Gilgamesh, Kirei resolved to destroy not only Kiritsugu but the dream he had dedicated his life to as well. In a climactic duel to the death, Kiritsugu ultimately defeated the vengeful priest, leaving him fatally wounded. Nevertheless, Kirei was able to make a wish upon the cursed "Holy Grail" that resulted in much of Fuyuki's destruction. Upon being revived by the Grail, Kirei committed his entire existence to freeing the dark power within it (i.e. Angra Mainyu).

==== Fate/Stay Night ====
In the first route of Fate/stay night simply called Fate, Kirei Kotomine emerges as the story arc's main antagonist after kidnapping Illyasviel von Einzbern to use her as a vessel for the Grail's cursed contents. In the ensuing climax, Shirō Emiya ultimately defeats him by destroying his heart with the Azoth Sword. In the second route, Unlimited Blade Works, Kirei attempts to use Rin Tohsaka as the vessel for the Grail only to be killed by his Servant, Lancer, well before the story's conclusion. In the final route, Heaven's Feel, he serves as both a protagonist and one of the story's primary antagonists. By prolonging Sakura Matō's life and facilitating her growth as the Black Grail, he plays a crucial role in ensuring her corruption by Angra Mainyu. However, his plans are foiled when Shirō and Rin manage to convince Sakura she is truly loved, thereby giving her the resolve to break free of the entity's hold. As the fully developed Angra Mainyu prepares to enter the world, a mortally wounded Kirei surfaces to prevent Shirō from getting in its way. Subsequently, the two engage in a brutal fight to the death until Kirei's heart gives out. Accepting defeat, he declares Shirō the winner of the Fifth Holy Grail War before collapsing lifelessly to the ground.

=== Other series ===
He also appears in Fate/Extra and Fate/Grand Order, among others.

== Reception ==
=== Critical response ===
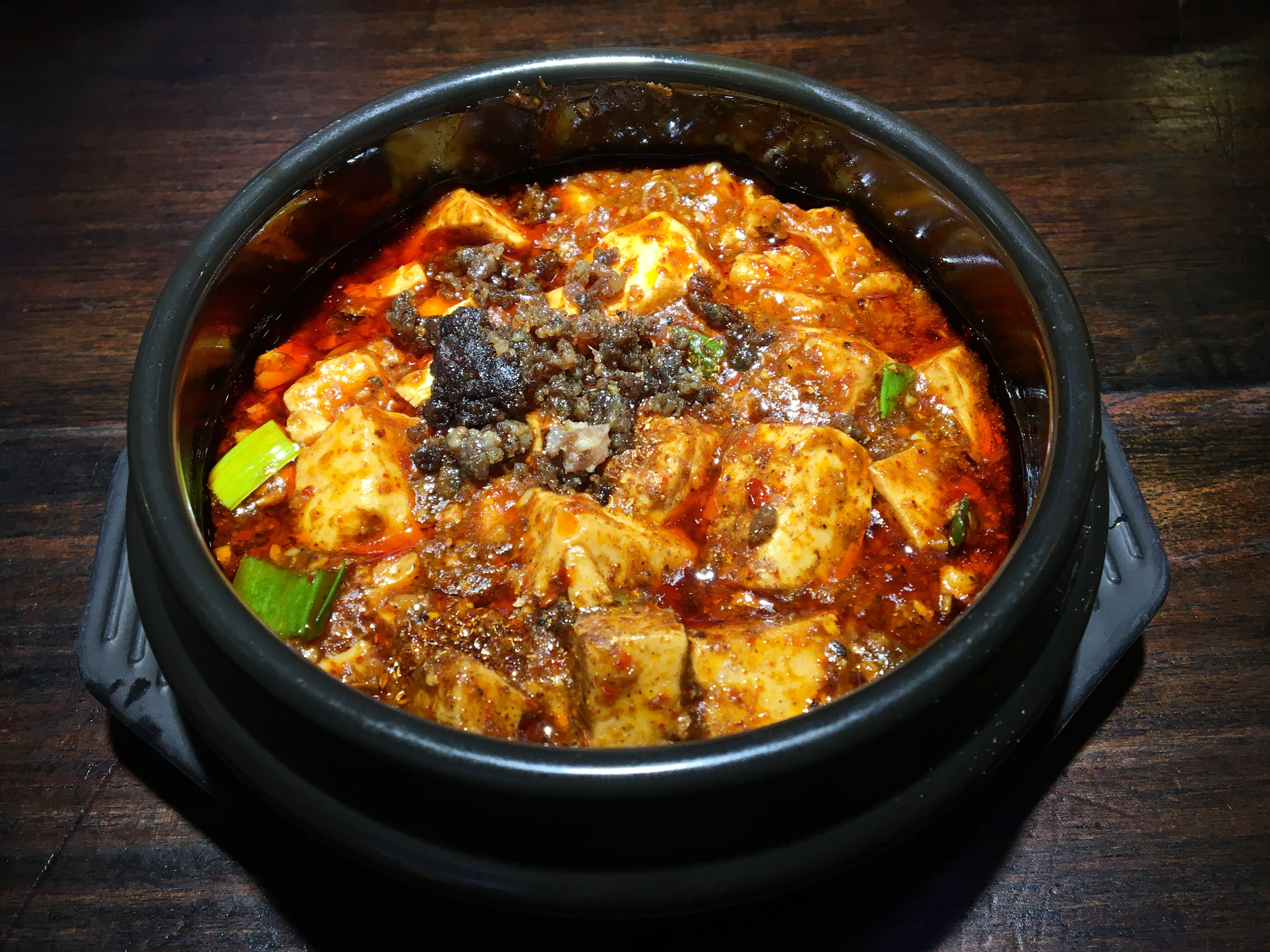
Kirei eating mapo tofu has received widespread acclaim.

In the Type-Moon 10th Anniversary Character Poll that was taken in 2012, Kirei had ranked at number eight. While in a Manga Tokyo poll from 2018, he was voted as the seventh most popular Fate character behind Illyasviel von Einzbern and Gilgamesh.

Reception of Kirei and Kiritsugu Emiya's relationship, however, was mixed. With Carlo Santos of Anime News Network saying that it came across as "flat" compared to the other character's relationships. Theron Martin of the same website noted that Kirei's gradual development over the course of Fate/Zero had gone "a long way" towards explaining his behavior in Fate/Stay Night, which he felt made the relationship between Rin and Sakura Tohsaka clearer. Japanator's Elliot Gay had noted his role as a "foil" to Kiritsugu's plans. Aiden Foote of THEM Anime Reviews found their relationship to be one of the highlights of the series. While Richard Eisenbeis at Kotaku had said the series should've had a backstory for Kirei. In a July 2015 poll, his rivalry with Kiritsugu was voted as the 11th best in the anime series.

=== Analysis ===
In his analysis of the magical system and details of the personalities of the characters, Makoto Kuroda sees in the idea of Shirou to become a “champion of justice” a direct analogy with the traditional view of the life of bodhisattvas in Mahayana Buddhism, seeking to save other people at the cost of their own efforts and suffering. In Kuroda's view, Buddhist concepts are opposed to the elements of Christian ethics contained in the plot through the opposition of Shirou and Kirei Kotomine in the form of the main character's rejection of the interpretation of Angra Mainyu as a creature who accepted the sins of others in the name of salvation.

In "From waifus to whales: The evolution of discourse in a mobile game-based competitive community of practice", Kotomine is as dark figure who deliberately becomes a more comical character when eating a tofu in such a hot temperatures that causes the character accidentally remove his clothes while taking the meal. This is also supported by the performance of his voice actor Jouji Nakata.

In "Desire and the Flexible Grail: The Japanese Fate Franchise and Evolving Notions of Arthurian Power" Kotomine is seen an archetype of Christian priest from fiction who initially shows himself as a kind man by devoting himself to the priest and often attempting to bond with the heroine Rin Tohaksa. However, the revelation of the Holy Grail War conflict between mages expands on the character who is a servant in the conflict and reavels a darker side. In "El rey de los héroes: Gilgamesh en los anime y mangas del universo Fate", scholars from Universidade de Lisboa noted that Kotomine is corrupted by Gilgamesh across Fate/Zero as a result of teaching his morals and become allies in future installments even if Gilgamesh's characterization changes in related Fate works.
