= Rin Tohsaka =

Fictional character in the Fate series

- Fate character
- Artwork of Rin from Fate/Stay Night
- First appearance: Fate/Stay Night (2004)
- Created by: Kinoko Nasu
- Designed by: Takashi Takeuchi
- Voiced by: English: Mela Lee (most media) Carli Mosier (Prisma Illya); Japanese: Kana Ueda

Rin Tohsaka (Japanese: 遠坂 凛, Hepburn: Tōsaka Rin) is a fictional character first introduced in the Japanese 2004 visual novel Fate/Stay Night, developed and published by Type-Moon. She is introduced as a high school student who becomes the mage master of the spirit warrior, Archer, whom she fights alongside in the Holy Grail War. In all routes of the visual novel, she meets and forms an alliance with the rookie mage Shirou Emiya, while the two of them then form a romantic relationship in the Unlimited Blade Works route, in which Rin is the main heroine. Rin returns in the game's sequels and in multiple adaptations outside the Fate universe. She is also present in the Fate/Zero light novel, written by Gen Urobuchi.

In Japanese, Rin is voiced by Kana Ueda, while in English, she is voiced by Mela Lee in every single incarnation of the series, except for Fate/kaleid liner Prisma Illya.

== Creation and conception ==
In the original version of the Fate/stay night visual novel, written by Japanese author Kinoko Nasu while in college. One of the main protagonist Ayaka Sajyo's enemies was a ″princess type girl″, known as Misaya Reiroukan, who was the master of Lancer. According to Nasu, this girl had a special "laughing archetype", which was similar to Luviagelita Edelfelt, a character from the sequel Fate/hollow ataraxia. However, after Sajyo's gender was switched and she was renamed as Shirou Emiya, Nasu and artist Takashi Takeuchi had decided to completely rewrite the character of Lancer's master.

Nasu had decided to make Rin a positive character, and on the advice of Takeuchi, he made her temperament to be similar to that of Aoko Aozaki, a character from his earlier visual novel, Mahoutsukai no Yoru. According to the screenwriter, his heroines were based on Aoko Aozaki (including Rin, Azaka Kokuto from Kara no Kyoukai, and Akiha Tohno from Tsukihime), feeling that Rin was the closest to the original character of Aoko. Initially, Nasu believed that this new heroine was too similar to Aozaki. Takeuchi attempted to convince him not to depart from the concept and explained the similarity between Rin and Aoko as a mental relation. Rin had a troubling background, facing financial problems due to the death of her parents in the background of the game. To further define Rin's character, the screenwriter decided to give multiple sides to her personality, designing her as a "beautiful" woman who would be cute and courageous, while at other times, aggressive. According to Takeuchi, such a move with the divergence of Rin's appearance and behavior was made to make her more attractive and adorable for fans.

After the release of Fate/stay night, Nasu felt that Rin had received the most complete character compared to the other heroes of the game and was his "favorite" heroine in the visual novel. However, according to the writer, while writing scenes with Rin, he was under severe pressure from Takeuchi and other Type-Moon participants who placed greater emphasis on Saber and Rider. In the end, Nasu decided to make Rin a contrast to Saber, perceived as an "ideal" girl in her eyes. Takeuchi was also pleased with Rin's final character, as well as the appearance of the prerequisites for this heroine's romantic relationship not only with Shirou, but also with Archer and Lancer, and called Rin a ″face of Fate, but in a different sense than Saber”. Nasu stated that "with a girl like that by his side, even an unsociable person like Shirou loses his presence of mind."

In the making of the Unlimited Blade Works anime, the Japanese animation studio Ufotable and Nasu agreed to slightly change Rin's look from the original visual novel believing it was still considered lacking "appeal". Since Nasu found the original Rin to be "too unsociable", he felt that Rin's anime counterpart should be "more" social. In order to further develop the new characterization of Shirou Emiya, Ufotable paid attention to the way Rin and Shirou interacted, leading to Shirou being more amicable towards others than in the visual novel.

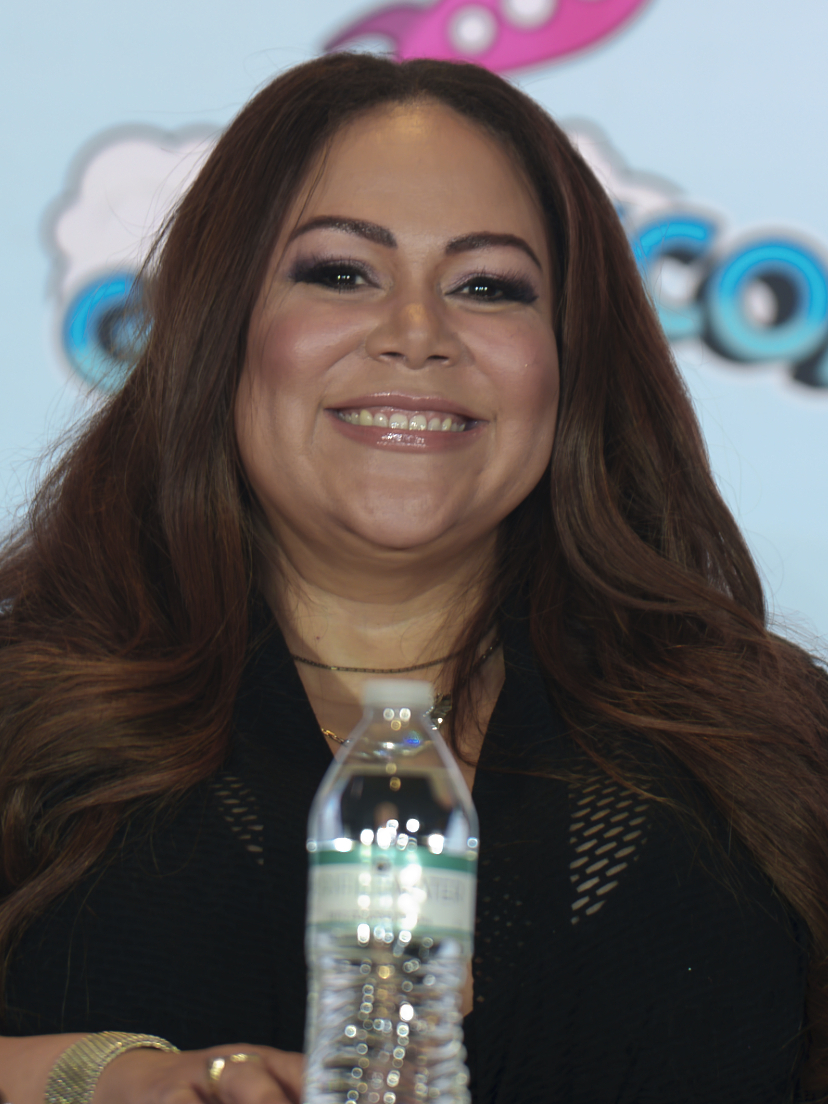
Mela Lee (pictured) voices Rin Tohsaka in her English appearances.

=== Casting ===
In the original Japanese version of the Fate/Stay Night series, Kana Ueda voiced Rin Tohsaka. Ueda had noted that when she first started voicing Rin, she developed a sense of "incompatibility" with her character. As a result, while the director expressed a similar opinion, Ueda's experience helped her to further connect with Rin. She described Rin's character as "kind of like the onee-san (elder sister) character, where she is responsible for guiding Shiro through his adventure". Ueda had also expressed that Rin was one of the most known characters she had voiced, due to how often fans asked her to include her name during autograph sessions. In the series' English dub, Mela Lee voices Rin. Lee regarded Rin, alongside Rozen Maiden's Shinku and Blade of the Immortal's Rin Asano, as one of the works where her career improved. However, in the Fate/kaleid liner Prisma Illya anime adaptation, Lee is replaced by Carli Mosier as Rin's voice actor.

=== Design ===
While designing Rin's visual appearance, Takashi Takeuchi had worked with the goal of making her possess a sense of arrogance and "fake-perfection" while being surrounded by an "atmosphere of inaccessibility″. Takeuchi regarded Rin as a model student and therefore sought to create a school uniform that would fit her role. At the same time, her outside school clothes were designed in a more casual style, that was explained as ″more comfortable for battles″. All of Rin's clothes were drawn in red to match the suit of her servant, Archer. Takeuchi had originally planned to emphasize Rin's temper with a special raised eye shape, often used in the anime industry for portraying cold-blooded and sharp characters, but went with round eyes for the finalization. Takeuchi also designed her hair with pigtails, heavily inspired by Asuka Langley Soryu from Neon Genesis Evangelion. Takeuchi also modelled much of Rin's personality to match that of Asuka's believing that it suited her "tsundere" nature.

== Characterization and themes ==
Rin Tohsaka is often characterized as a tsundere, which is a Japanese trope of characters with an initially harsh personality, that gradually erodes over time. She does not talk to other students in her school often, and usually exhibited a desire to be left alone, exemplified by her tendency to stay on the school's rooftop. She is secretly a mage participating in the Fifth Holy Grail War. At the beginning of the story, she summons Archer as her Servant, although she originally wanted to summon Saber. Rin is depicted as the heir to her family's magecraft, by her father, Tokiomi Tohsaka, in an attempt to make her prioritize sorcery over her own interests. When she was young, Rin was separated from her sister Sakura, who was adopted by the Matou family. After her father is killed in the Fourth Holy Grail War, Rin continued to work on her sorcery with guidance from her guardian, Kirei Kotomine. Several years later, she and Sakura had observed a young Shirou Emiya attempting to jump over a high bar for a fitness test, and secretly found his dogged perseverance attractive.

Rin specializes in energy transformation, which includes the storage of mana in objects. She stores her mana in jewels that she regularly charges to bypass her body's natural limitations on releasing energy. Rin can detonate the jewels on contact with an object, resulting in a release of energy. Her most common offensive spell is Gandr, which fires concentrated Mana in the form of a black orb from her finger. On contact, the spell amplifies physical conditions—a person who is already sick, for example, can become far sicker upon being hit, she can also imbue it with enough power to instantly knock out weaker beings on contact. Rin is also proficient with reinforcement sorcery, which she uses on her legs to give herself more speed or strengthen her fists so as to better implement her karate. She is written to be somewhat of a prodigy in mage craft. While most mages are proficient at one, sometimes two elements, Rin possesses the very rare trait of being equally skilled in all five and is thus known as an Average One.

== Appearances ==
=== In Fate/Stay Night ===
Rin is a young mage first introduced in on the Fate route of Fate/stay night visual novel. Following her encounter with Berserker, Rin suggests a temporary truce with protagonist Shirou Emiya to deal with the servant and his master, Illyasviel von Einzbern. The Unlimited Blade Works route casts her as a heroine, where she and Shirou enter a romantic relationship, and in the true end, they travel to England to study magecraft at the Clocktower after the servant Saber destroys the Holy Grail, the prize of winning a war between mages and servants. In the good ending, Rin lives peacefully with Shirou and Saber as her familiar, supplying the latter with Mana. In the Heaven's Feel route, her relationship with her sister, Sakura is expanded upon. She battles Sakura but later allows herself to be struck while she apologizes, hugging Sakura and expressing her true sisterly love. In the True End of the route, she travels to England to stand trial at a kangaroo court for her actions in the Holy Grail War and later comes back to visit Shirou, Sakura, and Rider after she becomes the apprentice of the Wizard Marshall Zelretch, who saved her from prosecution at the last second. Rin has appeared in the anime and manga versions of Fate/stay night, the movie Unlimited Blade Works (2010), and the trilogy from Heaven's Feel.

=== In Fate/Hollow Ataraxia ===
Rin returns as a major supporting character in the visual novel Fate/Hollow Ataraxia. Now as an adult, Rin continues her work as a mage under the Mages Association.

=== In Fate/Extra ===
Rin appears with a new servant known as Lancer, and is defeated by the game's main protagonist, Hakuno Kishinami. She also attempts to her seal herself in the middle of the Secret Garden to prevent being confronted by Kishinami.

=== Other appearances ===
Outside the original visual novel, Rin has been featured in two fighting games based on the events of Fate/stay night: Fate/unlimited codes, released in 2008 for arcades and the PlayStation 2, and Fate/tiger colosseum, released in 2007 for the PlayStation Portable. In the Fate/Zero light novel, Rin is featured as a child who is obsessed with learning her father's spells. In the final chapters, Kirei gives her a knife to Rin and reveal that her father had died. Outside Type-Moon's works and adaptations, she also appears in the video game Divine Gate. While in the manga spin-off Fate/kaleid liner Prisma Illya, Rin is depicted as a young sorceress sent by the wizard Kischua Zelretch Schweinorg to Japan in order to capture the Class Cards using the powers of a Magical Girl. After Ruby abandons her for Illya, Rin forces Illya to accomplish her mission in her stead, all while guiding and supervising Illya. Though normally competent, her constant fighting with Luvia often causes them to create various embarrassing blunders, leaving Illya and Miyu with a negative opinion of their skills.

Rin is also present in the side game Capsule Servant alongside Shirou as playable characters. In promoting the animated adaptations of Unlimited Blade Works, Rin was added to the game Summons Board and The Alchemist Code. She is also present in Phantasy Star Online 2.

In May 2023, Rin was announced as part of a collaboration event in the 2023 gacha game Honkai: Star Rail, to promote the Unlimited Blade Works television series. She was additionally voiced in Chinese by Shuo Xiaotu and in Korean by Kim Bo-min.

== Reception ==
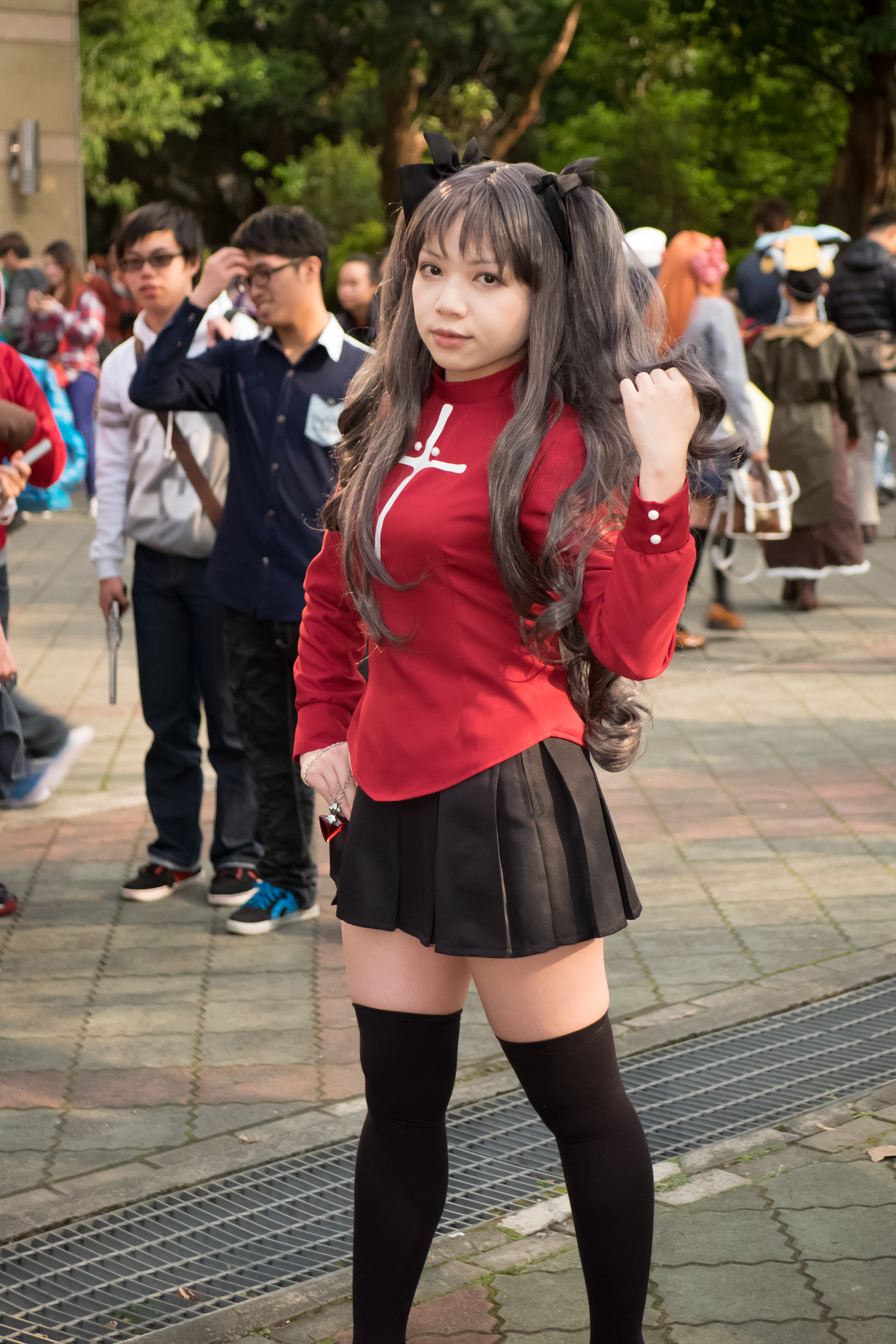
Rin Tohsaka cosplays.

Merchandise, including the Tohsaka Shrine; which consists of tapestries and acrylic mascots, have been modeled after Rin and her family. Rin Tohsaka was well received by the series' readers and critics. In the Newtype magazine's "Top 30 Characters of the 2010s", Rin was voted as the seventh "Most Popular Female Character". In an Unlimited Blade Works poll, she had taken third place. In Type-Moon's 10th Anniversary Character Poll, taken in 2012, Rin had ranked 4th. In 2015, Newtype readers voted her as the second best female character of the year behind Yukino Yukinoshita from My Teen Romantic Comedy SNAFU TOO!. In a Manga Tokyo poll from 2018, Rin was voted as the third most popular Fate character behind Shirou and Saber.

Critical reception to Rin's character in the first Fate/stay night anime adaptation by Studio Deen was positive. Stig Høgset at THEM Anime Reviews had enjoyed her characterization in the anime, and described her personality as "indirect" but "blunt". Her character has often been described as a tsundere, a Japanese archetype of fictional characters who either react ashamed or angry when interacting with people they cherish. Mania Entertainment's Chris Beveridge liked Rin's interactions with Shirou and Saber in the first anime despite lacking Archer. IGN had found Rin and Archer's alliance with Shirou and Saber "unlikely", as in the end the duos are supposed to fight each other. Carl Kimlinger at Anime News Network stated that while in the first series Rin and Shirou get the opportunity to stand out in fights, they are overshadowed by Archer. However, Theron Martin of the same site had stated that Rin only "steals the show" thanks to her sex appeal. Capsule Monster noted that while the use of many female characters including Rin might make the series feel like a harem, the plot managed to develop these characters in other ways. Todd Douglass Jr. at DVD Talk liked how despite starting as enemies, both Rin and Shirou become allies to dangerous threats regardless of the former's constant talks that all Masters are rivals.

Martin had also criticized Rin's and Shirou's relationship in the movie Unlimited Blade Works and noted that due to time issues, the movie "does not" expand on it. Blu-ray reviewer Jeffrey Kauffman enjoyed the developed relationship between Shirou and Rin as while they start as enemies, they become closer as the story progresses. The Unlimited Blade Works television series, produced by Ufotable, initially received praise from the UK Anime Network for its expanded portrayal of Rin and Archer, whom they regarded as the best characters in the show. However, they also labeled Rin and Shirou the "least interesting couple" in the animes. The review noted that in attempting to make Shirou more polite and amicable, Ufotable and Nasu made Rin overly arrogant, overbearing, controlling, and aggressive, even coming off as a total hypocrite when she chastises Shirou's ideals. Especially given that her own ideals as a mage and those of her father, Tokiomi, are far worse. Despite praising Rin character initially as a Strong Independent Woman, Dee Hogan at The Mary Sue criticized how Saber was "sidelined in favor of Rin" and that she deserved "much better".

The video game publication Japanator stated that Archer's betrayal towards Rin felt like a sad twist due to how the duo originally made a major understanding in the previous episodes. This made Rin's development take a sadder tone according to the reviewer. Anime News Network's reviewer Gabriella Ekens enjoyed the way the story between Rin and Shirou ended in Unlimited Blade Works, although the writer expressed that the romance between the two was not as appealing as it was made out to be, as well as concerns in whether or not Rin's comfort will even stop Shirou from going to his path of becoming Archer into the future, as Rin is against this, while Shirou still believes in his ideals despite having accepted its flaws as previously explored in the anime series.
