= Kiritsugu Emiya =

Fictional character from Fate franchise

- Fate character
- Kiritsugu Emiya in Fate/Zero by Takashi Takeuchi
- Created by: Kinoko Nasu
- Voiced by: English: Matthew Mercer (Fate/Zero, UBW) Marin Miller (young) Kirk Thornton (Fate/stay night); Japanese: Rikiya Koyama Miyu Irino (young)

Kiritsugu Emiya (Japanese: 衛宮 切嗣, Hepburn: Emiya Kiritsugu) is a fictional character first introduced in the Fate/stay night visual novel by Type-Moon and further explored later in the light novel prequel Fate/Zero by Gen Urobuchi. Kiritsugu is introduced as the late adoptive father of mage Shirou Emiya whom he saved from a fire. Before he died, Kiritsugu taught the child basic magecraft and divulged his dreams of becoming a hero. While Shirou and the player know more about Kiritsugu in the story, the light novel reveals him to be a fighter from the Fourth Holy Grail War, a conflict between mages from Fate/Zero. Kiritsugu participates in the Fourth Holy Grail War a decade before Fate/stay night, supporting his spouse Irisviel von Einzbern and his Servant Saber. Kiritsugu has also appeared in multiple spin-offs based on the Fate franchise.

As a minor character in the original visual novel, Kiritsugu's characterization in the light novel was mostly handled by writer Gen Urobuchi when he wrote Fate/Zero as a tragic prequel. His design was created by Takashi Takeuchi although he did not draw multiple illustrations of him. The character is voiced in Japanese by Rikiya Koyama who first voiced him in the 2006 anime adaptation of Fate/stay night. In the English dub, he was voiced by Matthew Mercer. Miyu Irino provides his Japanese voice during flashbacks, while Marin Miller voices him in English when he was a child.

Critical reception to Kiritsugu's character has been generally positive because of his mix of a dark and a light personality as evidenced by his actions such as his relationship with his family and his violent methods. His rivalry and fight with Kirei Kotomine has also received praise. The character has been popular within the Type-Moon and Fate fanbases, often appearing on both popularity and general anime polls.

== Appearances ==
=== Fate/stay night ===
Kiritsugu is first mentioned in the visual novel Fate/stay night as the late adoptive father of Shirou Emiya. He taught his son basic magecraft and passed on his ideals before his death. Because of Shirou's young age, Kiritsugu had previously asked a friend, Taiga Fujimura, to look after him after he died. Throughout the story, Shirou meets Kiritsugu's daughter Illyasviel von Einzbern. Shirou learns Kiritsugu participated in a conflict known as the Fourth Holy Grail War and in its aftermath he passed the child Shirou the scabbard Avalon: The Everdistant Utopia (全て遠き理想郷, Subete Tōki Risōkyō) to protect him from danger.

=== Fate/Zero ===
Kiritsugu is the main protagonist of the light novel prequel Fate/Zero. He participates in the Fourth Holy Grail War, a conflict between multiple mages and their Servants, with Kiritsugu's Servant being Saber. He is introduced as the husband of the homunculus Irisviel von Einzbern and the father of a younger Illyasviel. Born in Fuyuki City, Kiritsugu was raised on Alimango Island, where he lived with his father, Norikata, a mage specializing in time magic. He had a crush on a local girl named Shirley. However, Shirley became a vampire after drinking one of Noritaka's potions. Their village was soon overrun by Executors from the Church and Enforcers from the Mages' Association — agents whose respective purpose was to destroy all the vampires and eliminate any trace of civilization and vampirism on the island. Realizing that his father had intended for the village to be the testing site for his research on immortality, Kiritsugu shot his father to prevent a similar tragedy from unfolding again in the future. He then came under Natalia Kaminski's wing and assisted her as she hunted down rogue mages. As they continued to eliminate dangerous threats to world peace and stability, Kiritsugu chose to kill Natalia during one such mission, in order to prevent a worst-case scenario. Around eleven years before the Fourth Holy Grail War, he took on a child soldier he had rescued as his apprentice, whom he eventually named Maiya Hisau, training her in much the same way Natalia had trained him. Maiya would later go on to become his mistress. Two years later, Kiritsugu was hired by the Einzbern family to be their representative in the coming conflict. Believing that the Holy Grail could grant his wish for world peace, he left behind his former work as a mercenary.

Despite being the true Master of the Einzbern family, Kiritsugu operates mostly in the background during the conflict, ambushing other Masters while they are otherwise occupied. Saber partners with Irisviel and acts out in the open to avoid conflict between Kiritsugu and Saber, as their methodologies conflict. During his final fight with master Kirei Kotomine, Kiritsugu is dragged into the Grail that takes Irisviel's form taking the identity of "Angra Mainyu". Kiritsugu realizes that the Grail would interpret his wish by killing off every person on Earth except for himself and his family. He then orders Saber to destroy the Grail. However, Angra Mainyu chooses Kirei as the winner, granting him his wish of casting a huge fire. Kiritsugu looks for survivors, discovering an amnesiac boy he names Shirou and adopts. Kiritsugu then spends months trying to retrieve his daughter Illya, but he is forbidden from doing so. Years pass as Kiritsugu wastes away from the Grail's curse. A young Shirou ends up taking his father's dream before Kiritsugu dies peacefully.

=== Other appearances ===
Besides the Fate/Zero light novels, Kiritsugu has appeared in the anime and manga adaptations of it. A drama CD exploring Kiritsugu's life with Shirou and Fujimura was released as well as a sound drama. A mobile phone game also adapts Kiritsugu's life in the series. An alternate Kiritsugu appears in the manga Fate/kaleid liner Prisma Illya first as a married man with Irisviel who works overseas and has Illya as his daughter and Shirou as his adopted son. Another Kiritsugu appears in the sequels and the film Fate/kaleid liner Prisma Illya: Oath Under Snow (2017). In this version, Kiritsugu and Shirou search for a mysterious child named Miyu Satsuki. Upon finding her, Kiritsugu has mixed feelings about her; while Shirou considers her a new member of their family, Kiritsugu is against this because he aims to use her powers to save the world. However, Kiritsugu dies of unknown causes, leaving Shirou alone to take care of Miyu and decide what to do with her. He also appears in the video game Fate/tiger colosseum UPPER, and the manga Today's Menu for the Emiya Family where he tastes Shirou's cooking for the first time. The video game Fate/Grand Order also features an alternative Kiritsugu who has become the Servant "Assassin" (アサシン, Asashin) who did not separate from Irisviel. In Fate/Accel Zero Order, Assassin takes part in the Fourth Holy Grail War, facing multiple enemies. Outside the Fate franchise, Kiritsugu appears in the video game Toy Wars as part of a collaboration with GungHo Online Entertainment to promote Fate/Zero.

== Creation and design ==
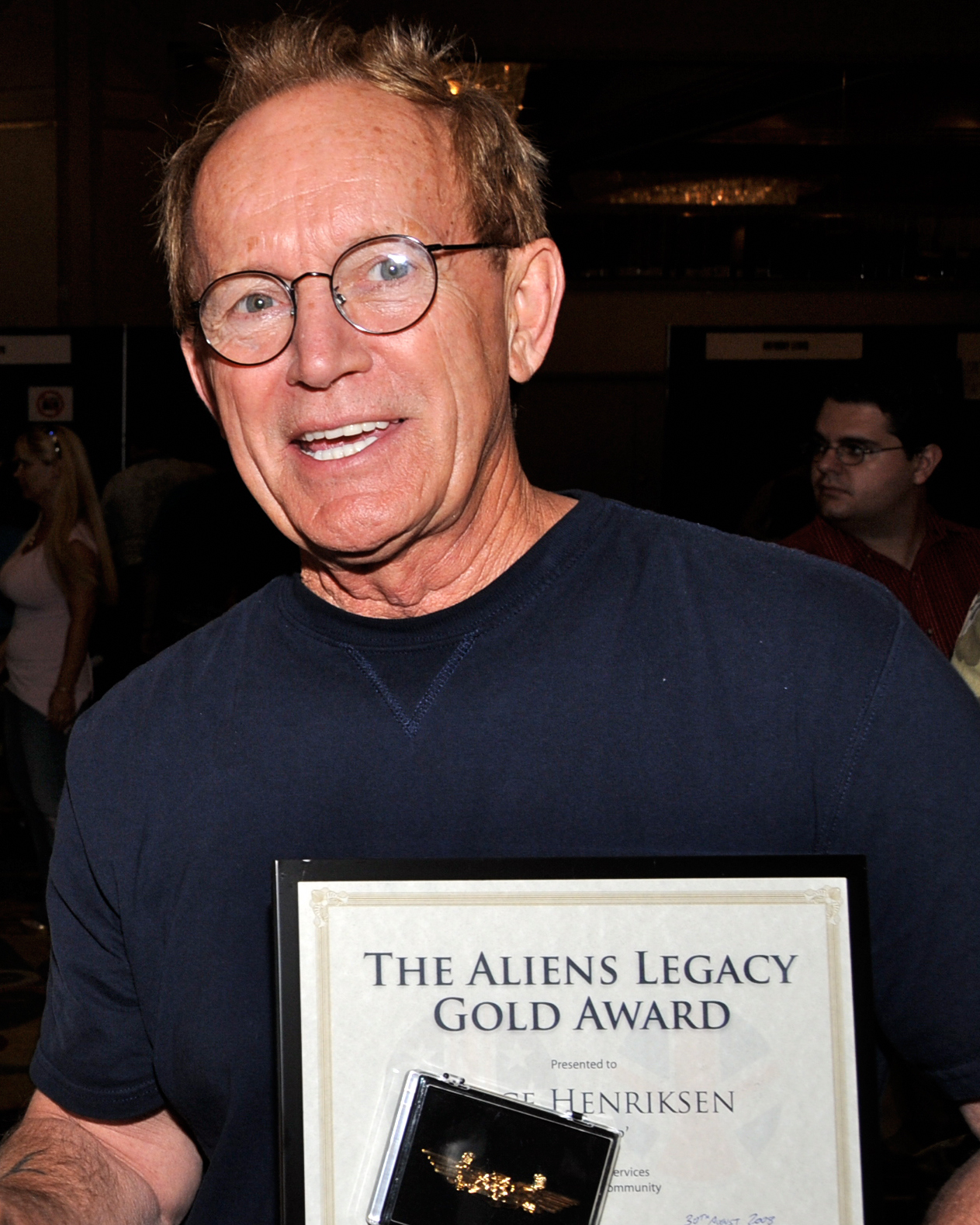
One of Kiritsugu's main influences during his fight scenes was Lance Henriksen.

In the making of the character, Kinoko Nasu stated that Kiritsugu used boku (僕), a first person pronoun most generally used by young boys. It was part of Nasu's character design as Gen Urobuchi felt he could never come up with it. Character designer Takashi Takeuchi felt that the young Kiritsugu looks like the protagonist of a shonen manga. While he was the protagonist of Fate/Zero, there was little artwork compared to other characters, as he only appeared on the cover twice. One shot was from the back, while the other was only a silhouette. Urobuchi felt that, because Kiritsugu abstains from the flashiness of Heroic Spirits, the best solution was to make him unnoticeable, as a "character who spreads justice should speak with their back". Nasu believes Kiritsugu avoids facing personal issues in his story in contrast to Shirou Emiya whose characterization and growth is explored more in the visual novel.

When inspired to write Fate/Zero, Urobuchi approached Nasu with the idea of a duel between Kiritsugu and Kirei Kotomine. After a discussion involving Takeuchi, Urobuchi felt that his career was going well so he could finally write the story he wanted. He believes that despite how tragic the ending is, the happy ending of Fate/stay Night would not be affected because Fate/Zero is a prequel about Kiritsugu's early life. When starting the project for Fate/Zero, Nasu decided to give Urobuchi complete freedom over Kiritsugu's characterization. As in the original Fate/stay night Saber states she did not know her former master, Kiritsugu, well. Urobuchi created Kiritsugu's wife, Irisviel von Einzbern, to facilitate communication between Saber and Kiritsugu. The staff was worried about how Urobuchi would handle the relationship Kiritsugu has with Saber. They were afraid if Saber's distrust toward Kiritsugu was excessive, it would be difficult for her open her heart to Shiro, Kiritsugu's adopted child, in the sequel. As a result, Urobuchi had to alter some of his original ideas. Urobuchi stated that in his works the characters who survive the plot's events become "pillars". While Saber, Kiritsugu, and Kotomine are the major survivors, Kiritsugu dies offscreen, and since Saber does not have a large role in Fate/Zero, the pillar character is Kirei.

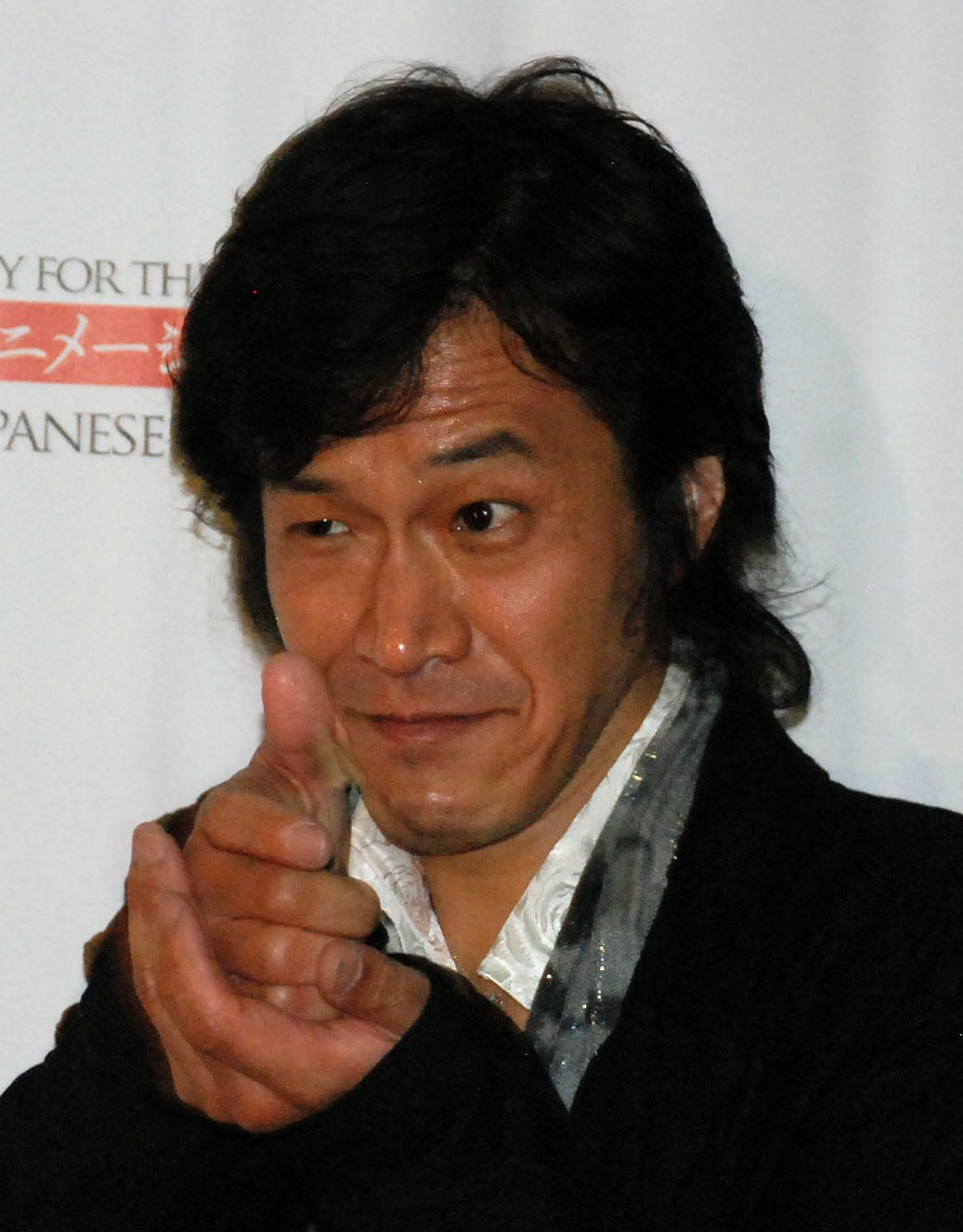
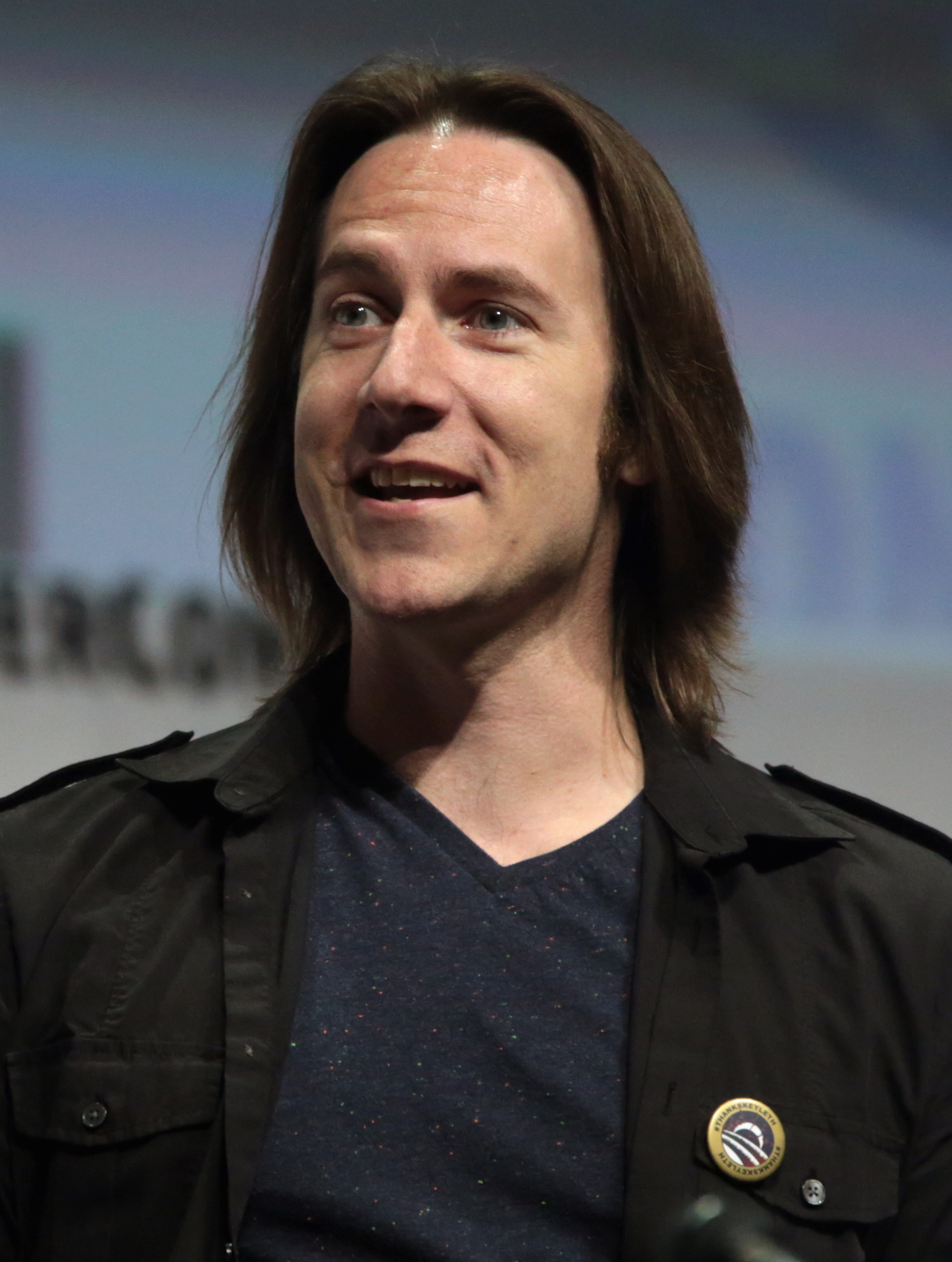
Rikiya Koyama (left) and Matthew Mercer (right) voiced Kiritsugu in Japanese and English, respectively.

When fighting, Kiritsugu employs different types of guns. His most known is a Thompson/Center Contender which served as one of the main ideas that led to the creation of Fate/Zero which was also inspired by Lance Henriksen's performance in the 1993 film Hard Target. Another of Kiritsugu's main weapons is a Calico M950 but the reloading of bullets was modified to save more time. Additionally, the Calico was created to make Kiritsugu look cool while coming across as a heretical gunman as he is a heretical unorthodox mage, especially during his fight against Kirei Kotomine. Besides regular guns, Kiritsugu uses a spell known as the Origin Rounds (起源弾, Kigen-dan) which Nasu compared to usage of guns in role-playing games due to the relative damage it could perform on other mages. Urobuchi called the final battle between Kiritsugu and Kirei "the most difficult battle scene in the novel" for him as a writer, due to a strong imbalance of forces, according to the author, between opponents (Kiritsugu possessed firearms, time magic and regeneration from Avalon, while Kotomine was only a master of the martial art bajiquan).

When voice actor Rikiya Koyama first played Kiritsugu in the Studio Deen anime adaptation of Fate/stay night, he had one line of dialogue where Kiritsugu looked at the night sky and said "the moon is beautiful tonight" and then died with a sad laugh. The staff were so touched, however, that they made him do take after take of the line. Koyama was glad to do it, but he wondered why they were so concerned about one line in a huge production. Later, he found out the line was a key point that began the entire story of Fate. He was very surprised when he heard this. Because he had been in Fate/stay night, he was able to play the part of Kiritsugu again in Fate/Zero. He never thought the tiny part would lead to this. Miyu Irino voiced the younger Kiritsugu during his flashback episodes in Fate/Zero. Matthew Mercer provided the English voice of Kiritsugu as an adult. When celebrating father's day, Mercer said Kiritsugu is not a good father at all. When he finished recording his lines for the final episode of Fate/Zero, Mercer said that the last lines made him emotional. Marin Miller voiced his child self.

== Reception ==
=== Critical response ===
Critical reception to Kiritsugu's character has been generally positive. Morgan Lewis from VG Culture HQ called him "one of the most intriguing characters in all of anime and Japanese media", praising "his certain level of hidden depth beneath his cold and lifeless eyes" and his noble goals. Lewis further praised the complexity and flaws of the character, and hailed him as "the greatest character to grace Japanese anime." Kotaku regarded him as the best character from Fate/Zero feeling that despite his questionable actions he "is far from being an emotionless killing machine", which makes him interesting to watch. Anime UK News regarded him as a tragic hero with multiple depths of character depending on the media in which he is presented, though the reviewer felt the manga incarnation is not presented well. Anime News Network praised the tragedy that happens to both Saber and Kiritsugu and found that having each character wishing for solutions to world issues made the series worth watching. The writer also noted how both Saber and Kiritsugu are opposites due to their different backgrounds while at the same time being similar. They praised the high tragedy that happens to Kiritsugu and the other magicians because of the impact it has on the viewers, leaving them on a sad note. UK Anime News Network was impressed by how Kiritusugu's and Saber's relationship was explored in latter parts of the story showing that despite how similar they are in terms of personality, their methods are quite different because of Kiritusugu's violent methods. The Fandom Post enjoyed how Kiritsugu's past was shown in the anime feeling it adds more depth to his character, making viewers want to view the series again to see more of him. However, writer Chris Beveridge felt an entire episode focused on it felt unnecessary. Koi-nya felt that despite Kiritsugu's cruel personality, the impression he makes on viewers changes when they see his interactions with Irisviel and Ilyasviel as they provide more joy to him, while his true identity is explored across the story. Capsule Computers noted that as Kiritsugu's harsh methods escalate and his character changes, he becomes even more of a polar opposite to Saber. The reviewer praised the "gritty" flashback episodes for providing a clear explanation of how Kiritsugu's dark childhood had turned him into a cruel man despite his wish for world peace. Saber's Japanese voice actress, Ayako Kawasumi regretted that Saber did not understand Kiritsugu's beliefs and his kindness.

Anime News Network criticized the focus on the relationship between Kiritsugu and Kirei Kotomine saying it comes across as "flat" compared to other characters. Meanwhile, THEM Anime Reviews found Kiritsugu and Kirei's relationship as one of the series' highlights. On the other hand, the fight between these two characters was acclaimed by the Fandom Post due to the multiple techniques the characters used including both magic and normal weaponry. The fact that the climax is interrupted with Kiritsugu confronting the personification of the Grail provides more depth to his past as well as his desires. Matthew Mercer was called one of the best actors in the series' English dub, while Rikiya Koyama was also praised for his performance in the original version. In another review, a writer from ANN praised the original net animation (ONA) from Today's Menu for the Emiya Family as it handled the relationship between Kiritsugu with Shirou and Taiga Fujimura, something that Fate/Zero and other series only briefly touched on. Although Kiritsugu is dead by the events of Unlimited Blade Works, multiple sites praised how Shirou carries on his ideals and matures in the process, accepting them despite the issues they bring him.

=== Popularity ===
Kiritsugu has been popular with fans of the series. He was ranked 11th in Type-Moon's 10th Anniversary Character Poll in 2012. In a Newtype poll from 2012, Kiritsugu was voted as the third best male anime character behind Koyomi Araragi from Nisemonogatari and Rider. In the March 2019 issue of the magazine, Kiritsugu took the fourth spot. In another poll, Kiritsugu and Irisviel were listed as one of the best couples in anime. He was also voted the best master from Fate/Zero in a 2012 poll. In another poll, Kiritsugu and Kirei were voted as having the 11th best rivalry in an anime series. Kiritsugu came out on top on a My Navi News poll asking which Fate/Zero character readers would most like to date with 38.2% of the votes. Merchandising based on Kiritsugu has also been released as well as replicas of his guns.
