= Takashi Takeuchi =

Japanese artist

- 武内 崇
- Born: 28 August 1973 (age 53); Yachiyo, Chiba Prefecture Japan
- Occupation: Visual novel developer/artist
- Years active: 1998–present
- Known for: Co-founder of Type-Moon
- Notable work: Tsukihime, Fate/stay night
- Website: www.remus.dti.ne.jp/~takeucto/

Takashi Takeuchi (武内 崇, Takeuchi Takashi; born August 28, 1973) is a Japanese artist. He is notable as the co-founder of the visual novel, anime development, and production enterprise Type-Moon, and for his illustrations on the visual novels, Tsukihime and Fate/stay night, which were adapted into an anime and manga series. He has frequently collaborated with fellow game designer Kinoko Nasu. In 2008, they contributed the special scenario to the Sega/Chunsoft visual novel 428: Shibuya Scramble, which subsequently received a sequel anime titled Canaan. His real name is Tomotaka Takeuchi (竹内 友崇).

== Biography ==
Mangaka
Takeuchi originally intended to become a mangaka and in 1996 his manga 'F' was awarded an honourable mention at the 3rd Enix 21st Century Manga Grand Prize. In the winter of 1997 his short comic Yuusha-bu tadaima katsudouchuu!! (勇者部ただいま活動中！！) was published in an edition of § Monthly Gangan Wing (1996–2009) but he was unable to establish a regular serial.
Video games
He worked at the video game developer Compile as a CG artist but left the company in 1998 following restructuring. At the recommendation of a former colleague Takeuchi was reemployed at Eighting where he worked as a motion designer for fighting and shooting games.
Doujin circle management
In 1998, Takeuchi formed the doujin circle 'Takebouki' with his friend since middle school Kinoko Nasu. With the later addition of Takeuchi's former colleague and programmer from Compile Kiyobee (清兵衛) and the songwriter Keita Haga (芳賀 敬太), the circle developed into TYPE-MOON. Shortly after work began on TYPE-MOON's first game Tsukihime, OKSG, who Takeuchi had met on the Takebouki homepage, joined the circle as manager of the website. As Takeuchi was still employed while working on Tsukihime he would work on the game until 4 AM after arriving home. Despite this schedule Takeuchi was able to produce around four hundred images for the game in seven months. While working on Tsukihime Takeuchi lived in Ōta, Tokyo.
Establishing a company
In 2004, Takeuchi established the video game companies, Notes and TYPE-MOON as the main brand under which the games are published, assuming the role of representative.

== Characteristics ==
Maid fetish and "Saber face"
Takeuchi is notable for his fondness of maids, and the appearance of maid characters in both Tsukihime and Fate/stay night can be attributed to his tastes. In the TYPE-MOON doujinshi Tsukihime Dokuhon the maid character Hisui is described as being composed almost entirely from Takeuchi's preferences. Saber from Fate/stay night is especially favoured by Takeuchi and he has since designed a number of characters based on her design. This recurrent character design is popularly referred to as "Saber face".
Self Portrait and Nickname
Takeuchi illustrates himself as a caricature wearing a samue and often smoking when representing himself in TYPE-MOON works. There is a low chance of this portrayal appearing in Melty Blood when Mecha-Hisui is selected, as a nod to his fondness of the character. Within TYPE-MOON, and at doujinshi market events he is referred to with the cute nickname "Take-chan" (武ちゃん) Japanese honorifics § Chan. He is also called "shachō" (社長, company president) by fans.
Inspirations
Takeuchi's favourite artists are Yasuhiro Nightow, Takami Akai, Shou Tajima, and Yoshihiro Togashi. He has been influenced by the manga Yu Yu Hakusho. During middle school he and his friend Nasu read and were inspired by Ken Ishikawa's manga adaptation of Makai Tenshō. He is a fan of Shotaro Ishinomori. Takeuchi has been influenced by the work of Takeshi Obata, for example, he used the character Akari Fujisaki from the manga Hikaru no Go as the model for Tsukihime's Satsuki Yumizuka. Takeuchi has also taken inspiration from anime: Fate/hollow ataraxia's Caren Hortensia and Bazett Fraga McRemitz were based on Neon Genesis Evangelion's Rei Ayanami and Wicked City's Makie respectively. Yoshiaki Kawajiri, and Yoshiyuki Sadamoto are also among his inspirations.

== Works ==
=== Video games ===
- Tsukihime (2000) – planning, character design, original artist, CG, backgrounds, production director
- Tsukihime Plus-Disc (2001) – character design, art
- Kagetsu Tohya (2001) – planning, character design, original artist, CG, production director
- Melty Blood (2002) – character design, concepts
- Fate/stay night (2004) – planning, character design, layout, original drawings, project manager, producer
- Fate/hollow ataraxia (2005) – planning, character design, original drawings, production coordinator, producer
- 428: Shibuya Scramble (2008) – bonus scenario character design
- Fate/Extra (2010) – servant design, character concept art
- Witch on the Holy Night (2012) – planning, original characters design, producer
- Fate/Extra CCC (2013) – servant design, original design, limited edition package illustration
- Fate/Grand Order (2015) – art direction, character design
- Fate/Extella (2016) – original character design
- Tsukihime -A piece of blue glass moon- (2021) – main character design, original drawings, storyboard, layout, producer
- Melty Blood: Type Lumina (2021) – character design, character illustrations, executive producer
- Melty Blood: Twi-Lumina (2027) – character design, character illustrations, executive producer

=== Novel illustrations ===
- The Garden of Sinners (1998–2008)
- Vampire Wars reprint (2004–2005)
- Fate/Zero (2006–2007)
- Eisen Flügel (July 2009-December 2009)

=== Anime ===
- Lunar Legend Tsukihime (2003) – original character design
- Fate/stay night (2006) – original character design, character design supervision, producer, OP 1 storyboard
- The Garden of Sinners series (2007–2013) – original character design, producer
- Canaan (2009) – Original character design
- Fate/stay night the Movie: Unlimited Blade Works (2010) – original character design, producer
- Fate/Zero (2011–2012) – original character design, producer
- World Conquest Zvezda Plot (2014) – chief producer
- D-Frag! (2014) – episode 1 end card
- Fate/stay night: Unlimited Blade Works (2014–2015) – original character design, producer
- Fate/Grand Order: First Order (2016) – original character design, planning
- Fate/stay night: Heaven's Feel (2017–2020) – original character design, producer
- Fate/Grand Order: Moonlight/Lostroom (2017) – original character design, planning
- Today's Menu for the Emiya Family (2018) – planning, producer
- Fate/Grand Order – Absolute Demonic Front: Babylonia (2019) – lead character designer, producer
- Fate/Grand Order – Divine Realm of the Round Table: Camelot (2020) – lead character designer
- Eisen Flügel – original character design (TBA)

=== Manga ===
- Yuusha-bu tadaima katsudouchuu!!
- The Garden of Sinners: Future Gospel
