= MiChi discography =

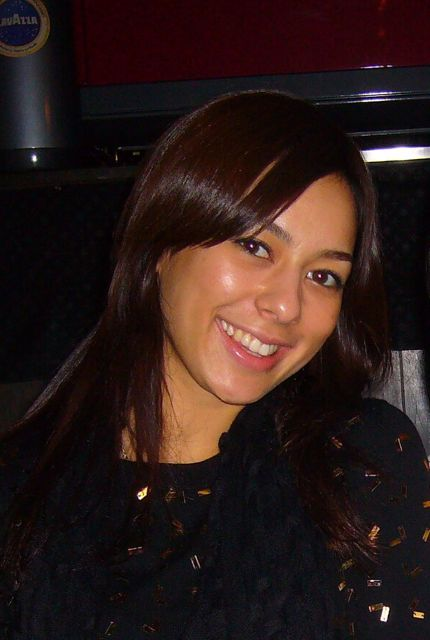
- Studio albums: 3
- EPs: 1
- Singles: 12
- B-sides: 17
- Music videos: 15

The discography of MiChi consists of three studio albums, and many singles, first released on the independent MMM Records (a subsidiary of File Records) in 2008, and from 2008 onwards released under Sony Music Entertainment Japan.

== Studio albums ==
Title	Album details	Peak chart positions (JPN)	Sales
Michi Madness	Released: June 27, 2008; Label: MMM Records (MMM-001); Formats: CD, digital download	142	4,700
Up to You	Released: September 30, 2009; Label: Sony (AICL-2055); Formats: CD, digital download	4	62,700
Therapy	Released: March 21, 2012; Label: Sony (AICL-2349); Formats: CD, digital download	32	5,400

== Singles ==
Title	Year	Peak chart positions		Sales	Certifications	Album
Title	Year	Oricon Singles Charts	Billboard Japan Hot 100	Sales	Certifications	Album
"Promise"	2008	12	4	39,000	RIAJ full-length cellphone: gold	Up to You
"Change the World"	2009	19	2	18,000		Up to You
"Kiss Kiss xxx"	2009	30	15	10,000		Up to You
"You"	2009	20	9	5,700		Up to You
"All About the Girls (Ii Jan ka Party People)" (いいじゃんかParty People, "Isn't It Great, Party People?")	2010	24	46	7,400		—
"Together Again"	2010	24	—	7,400		Therapy
"Wonder Woman" (Michi x The Telephones)	2010	54	84	2,100		Therapy
"Love Is"	2010	49	7	2,300		Therapy
"One"	2011	85	43	1,000		Therapy
"Find Your Way"	2011	93	62	700		Therapy
"Tokyo Night"	2012	107	—	600		Therapy
"Starting Over"	2013	—	—			TBA
"Heartbeat"	2013	—	—			TBA
"Independent Girl?"	2013	TBA	TBA			TBA

=== Promotional singles ===
Title	Year	Peak chart positions	Album
Title	Year	Billboard Japan Hot 100	Album
"Fxxk You and Your Money"	2008	—	Michi Madness
"Real"	2008	—	Michi Madness
"Madness Vol. 2"	2008	—	Michi Madness
"Hey Girl"	2008	—	Up to You
"Wonderland"	2009	84	Up to You
"Up to You"	2009	24	Up to You
"You Gotta Be (Acoustic Ver.)"	2009	—	—
"Madness Vol. 3"	2012	—	Therapy

== Other appearances ==
Year	Song	Album
2009	"Fxxk You and Your Money (Yummy vs. Igoda Club Mix)"	House Nation Conductor - Yummy
2010	"Fxxk You and Your Money (Yummy Remix)"	DISK
2011	"Saturday Night" (World Famous Old Nick Team featuring MiChi)	Manhattan Records "The Exclusives" Japanese R&B Hits (Mixed by DJ Hasebe)
2012	"Dare Yori Kimi Dake o" (誰より君だけを, "Only You, More than Anyone") (Studio Apartment featuring KG, MiChi)	Nihon no Uta
2012	"I'm OK" (Nerdhead featuring MiChi)	Cruise with You
