= Fate/Stay Night: Unlimited Blade Works (film) =

- Home media cover art, drawn by Takashi Takeuchi
- Directed by: Yūji Yamaguchi
- Written by: Takuya Satō
- Based on: Fate/Stay Night by Type-Moon
- Starring: Ayako Kawasumi; Junichi Suwabe; Kana Ueda; Noriaki Sugiyama; Mina; Tomokazu Seki; Hiroshi Kamiya; Nobutoshi Canna
- Music by: Kenji Kawai
- Production companies: Studio Deen; Geneon Universal Entertainment
- Distributed by: The Klockworx Co., Ltd.
- Release date: 23 January 2010
- Running time: 105 minutes
- Country: Japan
- Language: Japanese
- Box office: US$3,205,829

Fate/Stay Night: Unlimited Blade Works (Note: Japanese: 劇場版 Fate/stay night UNLIMITED BLADE WORKS, Hepburn: Gekijōban Feito/sutei naito Anrimiteddo Bureido Wākusu) (stylized as Fate/stay night: Unlimited Blade Works) is a 2010 Japanese animated fantasy action film directed by Yūji Yamaguchi. Unlimited Blade Works covers the events of the second route of the visual novel Fate/Stay Night by Type-Moon. The film primarily focuses on two young mages, Shirou Emiya and Rin Tohsaka, and their servants, who participate in a conflict known as the Holy Grail War. During the fights, Shirou often crosses paths with Rin's servant, Archer, who seeks his death despite being an ally.

The film was produced by Studio Deen following the 2006 release of their TV adaptation of Fate/Stay Night. The short length of the film brought difficulties to the staff members as they aimed to cover a story arc which required far more time to tell in the visual novel. The film was released in Japan on 23 January 2010 on 12 screens and grossed 37,699,500 Japanese yen.

Critical reception to the film was mixed. Praise was directed towards the development of Shirou, his interactions with Rin and Archer, and the exploration of his ideas in greater depth, which allowed for a greater understanding of his motives. These aspects, along with the animation of some fight scenes, were considered to be superior to the 2006 TV series. However, the narrative was widely criticized for its fast pace that cut large amounts of content from the visual novel, leading to confusion among viewers who were not familiar with the original work.

Type-Moon later collaborated with Ufotable to retell the Unlimited Blade Works route in the form of a television series, which first aired in 2014.

== Plot ==
On the 10th anniversary of the great fire of Fuyuki City, Rin Tohsaka performs the summoning ritual and summons Archer. Archer soon fights Lancer, but their fight is witnessed by Shirou Emiya who flees but is found by Lancer and killed. Rin uses her necklace to revive Shirou but he is later attacked again by Lancer and inadvertently summons Saber, who drives Lancer off. At a church, Kirei Kotomine tells Shirou about the Holy Grail War and he decides to fight. Shirou proposes an alliance to Rin, but they are interrupted by Illyasviel von Einzbern and Berserker. A fight ensues which Archer ends with a massive explosion. Illya withdraws and Shirou collapses from his injuries.

The next day, Shirou gets a weird feeling upon entering the school and meets with Rin to investigate. They encounter Rider and her master, revealed to be Shinji Matou. Rin saves Shirou while Shinji flees into the school. Shirou summons Saber and they find Shinji huddled in the corner of a classroom with a defeated Rider who disappears. Shinji claims that someone else did it and flees again. Later, Kotomine offers Shinji a new servant.

That night, Shirou sleepwalks to Ryuudou Temple where Caster attempts to take his command spells. Saber follows but is stopped by Assassin while Shirou is saved by Archer who then engages and overpowers Caster, sparing her life. Shirou argues with Archer, who tells Shirou to accept that he cannot save everyone. Ignoring him, Archer turns on Shirou before being rescued by Saber. Returning home, Rin, Shirou, and Saber are ambushed by Caster who stabs Saber with Rule Breaker, a weapon that nullifies servant contracts. Saber resists Caster's commands to kill Rin and Shirou before disappearing with Caster. Caster kills Kotomine and takes over the church and Rin and Archer soon confront Caster and her master Souichirou Kuzuki, but Archer betrays Rin. Shirou intervenes before Archer tells Caster to spare them. Outmatched, the two decide to request Illya's assistance.

Shirou and Rin arrive at Illya's castle to find Illya and Berserker being attacked by Shinji and his new servant Gilgamesh, who defeats Berserker and rips Illya's heart out. Rin and Shirou confront Shinji who offers them a chance to join him which they refuse, and Shinji and Gilgamesh retreat. Following a short argument, Rin and Shirou encounter Lancer, from whom they accept an offer of assistance.

Returning to the church, Lancer engages Archer while Rin and Shirou engage Caster and Kuzuki. The two are suddenly saved by Archer who kills both Caster and Kuzuki, then resumes his attack on Shirou. Rin forms a new contract with Saber and Archer reveals a reality marble called Unlimited Blade Works. Archer unleashes a hail of swords at Shirou and Saber and takes the opportunity to kidnap Rin. Shirou demands Archer to confront him at the Einzbern Castle.

Later, Shirou confronts Archer and deduces from Rin's earlier comment that Archer is actually Shirou's suicidal future self, who seeks to kill Shirou to end his own regretful existence. Shirou and Archer begin their fight while Lancer rescues Rin from Shinji and Kotomine, who reveals that he is alive and is Lancer's master. When Lancer refuses to kill Rin, Kotomine forces Lancer to commit suicide. Before dying, Lancer impales Kotomine from behind, scares Shinji away, unties Rin, and sets fire to the castle. Shirou experiences a vision of the future that awaits him but continues the fight regardless, defeating Archer and declaring that he will not regret what awaits him. Gilgamesh suddenly interrupts the fight and critically wounds Archer before withdrawing due to the fire. Rin later transfers a part of her magical seals over to Shirou so that he can utilize Unlimited Blade Works to counter Gilgamesh. Elsewhere, Gilgamesh implants Illya's heart into Shinji and he mutates into a large mass.

Arriving at Ryuudou Temple, Saber fights Assassin while Shirou and Rin confront Gilgamesh. Saber helps Rin defeat Assassin and Shirou activates Unlimited Blade Works. Rin rescues Shinji and is about to be trapped until Archer intervenes. Saber uses Excalibur to destroy the unfinished Holy Grail and disappears, having exhausted her magical energy. Meanwhile, Shirou overpowers and severs Gilgamesh's arm. This causes a void to open from the wound that begins to consume Gilgamesh. He attempts to take Shirou with him, but is defeated by Archer. Rin reunites with Archer, who tells her to look after his younger self. She promises to do so, and Archer disappears. With the war concluded, life resumes as normal, and Rin and Shirou begin a romantic relationship.

== Voice cast ==
Character	Japanese voice actor	English dubbing actor
Saber	Ayako Kawasumi	Michelle Ruff
Archer	Junichi Suwabe	Liam O'Brien
Rin Tohsaka	Kana Ueda	Mela Lee
Shirou Emiya	Noriaki Sugiyama	Sam Riegel
Caster	Atsuko Tanaka	Tara Platt
Shinji Matou	Hiroshi Kamiya	Doug Erholtz
Kirei Kotomine	Jouji Nakata	Jamieson Price
Illyasviel von Einzbern	Mai Kadowaki	Stephanie Sheh
Taiga Fujimura	Miki Itō	Julie Ann Taylor
Lancer	Nobutoshi Canna	Tony Oliver
Sakura Matou	Noriko Shitaya	Sherry Lynn
Assassin	Shinichiro Miki	David Vincent
Berserker	Tadahisa Saizen	Michael McConnohie
Gilgamesh	Tomokazu Seki	David Vincent
Rider	Yu Asakawa	Karen Strassman
Soichiro Kuzuki	Kazuhiro Nakata	Patrick Seitz
Announcer	Saori Hayami	–

== Production ==
The idea of creating an animated film based on the Unlimited Blade Works story arc of the Fate/Stay Night visual novel was first suggested to producer Mitsutoshi Ogura of Geneon Entertainment in 2005. At the time, he was organizing the production of the anime series for the same game. Ogura felt that Unlimited Blade Works and Fate – the latter used as the basis for the plot of the series – were the most interesting story arcs in the visual novel. Director Yūji Yamaguchi from Studio Deen had similar opinions, and noted that Unlimited Blade Works had many elements in common with shonen manga, with a large number of bright scenes. He stated that he felt that the plot and dramatic components of the story arc could be conveyed well in cinematic format. As a result, the film-making project was approved immediately after the work on the 2006 TV series was completed, and producer Norimitsu Urasaki joined the project.

According to Sato, the largest challenge for the production was the limitation on the length of the film. He had several meetings with producers and lobbied to increase the runtime to 107 minutes, which was approved. Yamaguchi understood that this runtime was extremely short in comparison to the 2006 series, where a similar sequence of events was told in 480 minutes. Therefore, he decided to try to create a balance between everyday scenes and battles by increasing the intensity and emotional weight of the latter, which led to a significant reduction in the content of the prologue shown earlier in the series. The director recalled that he originally wanted to demonstrate many everyday scenes between battles, which were prepared in Sato's drafts, but most of them never entered the final script. In the initial planning stage, Archer was considered as the central character, but attention was shifted to Shirou during production.

Since there had been a conflict between Fate author Kinoko Nasu and consultant Yamaguchi during the production of the TV series, Type-Moon only assigned a secondary advisor for the production of the film, and his opinion was taken into account only on general grounds. The director refused the complete exclusion of Nasu from the production team only because of fear of an excessive departure from the canons of the Fate franchise. The head of Type-Moon, illustrator Takashi Takeuchi, retained the role of a character design consultant. The only wish expressed by the creators of the visual novel to the producers was that the battle scenes should not become the dominant element of the film. However, Urasaki did not approve of this approach, as he feared that the audience might lose interest, and gave the right to finally determine the direction of Yamaguchi's work.

Shortly after the screenplay was approved in 2008, Studio Deen staff prepared a storyboard that was approved without major changes. Since the project budget exceeded the amount allocated for the 2006 series, it was decided that more work should be put into special effects during battle scenes. Special attention was paid to the rendering, since the creators sought to ensure that all the characters were equally well distinguishable and that there were no errors in the position of shadows relative to light sources. Staging of battles between masters was performed by Tsujitani, who took influence from the way tokusatsu Kamen Rider and Metal Hero tracked the movement patterns of the characters.

In contrast to the 2006 series, shades of red were emphasized in the color palette, which, according to the director, should have "added to the film entertainment and adult atmosphere". Due to the intense work with the script, Yamaguchi did not have enough time to track the accuracy of the transfer of the original character design, and this part was completely given to Takashi Takeuchi and studio staffer Megumi Ishihara.

The position of the recording director was given to Koji Tsujitani, retaining his position from the 2006 series. All the voice actors selected in 2005 for the series reprised their roles in the film, and were notified before work started on the animation. According to Junichi Suwabe, most of the voice actors were not told that they would be working on a film version of the Unlimited Blade Works route, and only Ayako Kawasumi, who played the role of Saber, had learned this exact information. Suwabe and his partner Kana Ueda, who voiced Rin, stated they were happy to be invited to participate in the film, as their characters were the main focus of the route.

The actors recalled that they were surprised by the abundance of dialogue in a relatively short film – in total, the entire script took up about a thousand pages. The dubbing took place over four days in the fall of 2009 and lasted continuously from morning until late evening, during which, according to Ouedy, the tired seiyū made a large number of errors. However, according to Suwabe, the entire cast did well with their work, because for three years since the release of the series, they had also participated in voicing new versions of the visual novel and other material of the Fate/Stay Night franchise. Also, Sayu noted that this experience, obtained through familiarization with the original source material, gave them a more complete understanding of their characters, which they tried to reflect in this film. Nevertheless, Tsujitani was dissatisfied with his own work, because he believed that he could not request the voice actors to give fundamentally different performances, and seriously thought about a complete rewriting of the voice track. However, after listening to the final version, Yamaguchi rejected this suggestion of the recording director and considered that the play of the seiyū exceeded his initial expectations.

The DVD and Blu-ray versions were released on 31 October 2010 in Japan, on 12 June 2012 in North America by Sentai Filmworks, and on 30 September 2013 in the UK by Manga Entertainment.

=== Audio ===
The film's soundtrack was composed by Kenji Kawai, who also composed for the 2006 TV series. Kawai wrote an entirely new soundtrack that incorporated almost no music from his previous composition for the television series. The only exception to this was the composition "Emiya", which was included with a new arrangement at the request of the producers. Compared to the series, the composer decided to increase the number of tracks with chorus that were performed by the Tokyo Symphony Orchestra, and also used more digital sound processing. Compositions were created according to the already finished visual series since Kawai noted his own inability to work with the storyboard without feeling the clear time frame of the melodies. The use of the compositions was jointly approved by Tsujitani and Yamaguchi, but the composer's opinion was also taken into account by the producer, with a number of key decisions on the choice of tracks made by Kawai and Tsujitani. The recording director decided to impose leitmotifs of the servant characters on the main melody of the scene composition, in order to emphasize references to the history of these characters at the right moments.

It took one month to create the entire musical soundtrack of the film. Kawai spent only one week writing the 27 tracks, and the rest of the time negotiating, fine-tuning and recording, for which the Dolby Digital system was used. The most difficult, according to Kawai, were the compositions for the scenes in which the dialogues of the characters overlapped the battles between them – as in the battle between Saber and Assassin – because the composer had to accurately select the rhythm so as not to destroy atmosphere of the action. Kawai emphasized that his main objective was to get as close as possible to the pace of what was happening so that the viewer would not have the feeling of listening to music, rather than watching the movie. Nevertheless, Kawai stated that the result of his efforts was "the work of an artisan, not an artist".

It was decided to entrust the opening and closing songs to singer Sachi Tainaka, as had been done with the series. In writing the lyrics, Tainaka reviewed all the works of the Fate franchise that existed at that time and tried to show the connection of the original source's themes with the real world, which, according to the singer, made the work for this film the most time-consuming of her career. The results were the songs "Imitation" and "Voice ~ Tadoritsuku Basho ~". Tainaka tried in the first to reflect the feelings of the protagonist about the need to have a loved one, and in the second to emphasize the emotional spectrum of the storyline. The producers asked Kawai to write music for the third song, which was planned to be included during the final battle between Shirou and Gilgamesh, but the composer refused, saying that "he cannot write three songs in a row about the same thing". As a result, the composition "Emiya" was used twice in the film.

== Songs ==
Title	Singer
"Imitation"	Sachi Tainaka
"Voice ~Tadoritsuku Basho~"	Sachi Tainaka

== Reception ==
Fate/Stay Night: Unlimited Blade Works received mixed reviews. Its relatively short duration, which strongly affected the development of the characters, was highly criticized. Anime News Network's Theron Martin commented that the total screen time was reduced by 80% relative to the series. Reviewers criticized the abridged prologue, which was shortened to three minutes, for hindering understanding of the premise, and that the first 25 minutes of the film repeated the plot of the first eleven episodes of the 2006 TV series. Various critics emphasized that the story progressed very hastily, with numerous jumps from one scenario's scenes to another without any explanation. Todd Douglass Jr. of DVD Talk said that this resulted in a "rushed, incomplete feeling as the story jumps from one scene to the next and one fight to the next."

John Rose from The Fandom Post wrote that the pace of the narrative "balanced on a thin line with complete incomprehension", which caused irritation among viewers and impeded immersion into the atmosphere. Rose considered that the creators implicitly recognized this fact and therefore allotted significantly more time to fight scenes during the culmination in an attempt to compensate for the weak narrative. Several reviewers asserted that the film failed to properly establish narrative coherency and that it was too confusing to be enjoyable for newcomers to the franchise. For this reason, critics did not recommend the film to viewers unfamiliar with the visual novel or the television series, and stated that the film did not work as an independent production.

In a highly critical review for the UK Anime Network, Ross Liversidge stated that he felt the film would only appeal to fans of colorful fighting scenes, as he considered the story "completely broken". However, Martin and Chris Beveridge from The Fandom Post thought that newcomers would be able to understand what was going on with some difficulty.

Other aspects of the film received more positive feedback. Martin noted that, compared to the TV series, the film did not involve elements of the harem genre, and that the romance between Shirou and Tohsaka Rin was well-developed. Chris Homer of The Fandom Post noted that in comparison to Shirou's unpopular characterization in the TV series, the film depicted how Rin helped him learn from his weaknesses and maintain his "hero's ideology", even giving lessons to Archer. Homer also praised the development of Archer, who he called "the main star of the picture", and believed that the film successfully illustrated his opposition to Shirou. Martin also singled out Shirou's idealism as the main theme of the film adaptation and noted interesting similarities between Archer and Kiritsugu Emiya, including "how to become a hero and not turn out to be [a] cynic". However, The Fandom Post reviewers noted that although the different development of the characters in the film contrasted with that of the 2006 TV series, they welcomed the film's ending.

In comparison to the 2006 TV series, the film's visuals were praised, with reviewers noting that this was to be expected of a film adaptation. All critics gave high marks to battle scenes between servants, the most spectacular of them recognized the battle between Saber and the Berserker. Beveridge, however, emphasized that although the film's visuals were superior to the 2006 TV series, they were visually inferior to the later Fate/Zero series produced by Ufotable in 2011. Ross Liversidge commented positively on the color scheme of the film. John Rose negatively reacted to replacing content from sexual scenes in the visual novel with "inappropriate neon inserts", but acknowledged it would have been difficult to include the original version due to its mature content. Kenji Kawai's music also received praise.

The film was the last joint project between Studio Deen and Type-Moon management. Four years later, Type-Moon contracted Ufotable to make a television adaptation of the Unlimited Blade Works storyline, following their previous successful adaptations of Fate/Zero and The Garden of Sinners.

=== Box office ===
Fate/Stay Night: Unlimited Blade Works grossed US$3,205,829 worldwide, including ¥280 million ($3.2 million) in Japan and $5,829 in Taiwan.
