= Fate/Stay Night (2006 TV series) =

2006 animated series

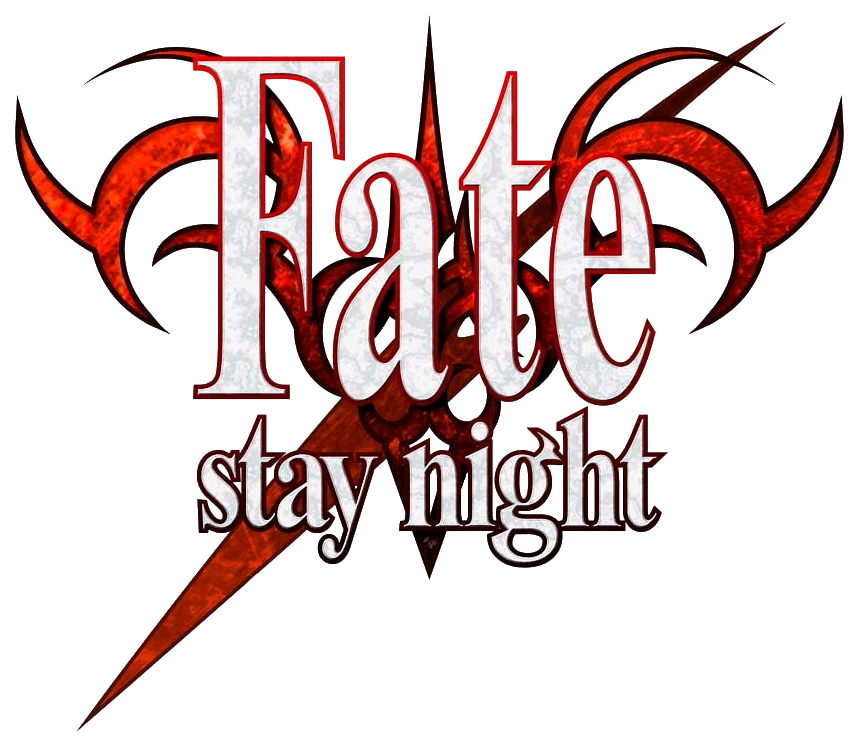
- Genre: Action; Adventure; Battle royale
- Based on: Fate/Stay Night by Type-Moon
- Developed by: Takuya Satō
- Written by: Kinoko Nasu
- Directed by: Yūji Yamaguchi
- Voices of: Noriaki Sugiyama; Ayako Kawasumi
- Music by: Kenji Kawai
- Opening theme: "Disillusion" by Sachi Tainaka; "Kirameku Namida wa Hoshi ni" by Sachi Tainaka
- Ending theme: "Anata ga Ita Mori" by Jyukai; "Hikari" by Jyukai
- No. of seasons: 1
- No. of episodes: 24 (list of episodes)

Production
- Producers: Masaaki Saito; Fate Project
- Cinematography: Shin'yo Kondō
- Animator: Studio Deen
- Editor: Masahiro Matsumura
- Running time: 24 minutes
- Production companies: CREi; Geneon Entertainment; TBS Holdings; Type-Moon; Frontier Works

Original release
- Network: Television Saitama, Tokyo MX, KBS, CTC, Television Kanagawa, SUN, TV Aichi, AT-X
- Release: January 7 – June 17, 2006

Fate/Stay Night (stylized as Fate/stay night) is a Japanese dark fantasy anime television series produced by Studio Deen, directed by Yūji Yamaguchi, and supervised by Takashi Yamana. The anime is the first animated series based on Type-Moon's Fate video game franchise, and focuses primarily on the Fate route and arc established in the previously released visual novel game Fate/Stay Night, while incorporating certain elements from the other two routes. The series is also referred to and known as "DEEN/Stay Night", in reference to its animation studio as a means to distinguish it from the Visual Novel and other Fate anime and media.

Twenty-four episodes aired from January 7 to June 17, 2006 on Television Saitama, and at later dates on other Japanese television stations including CTC, KBS, Television Kanagawa, Tokyo MX, SUN, TV Aichi and AT-X. The series later received its international television premieres on the anime television network Animax in 2007, also receiving its English-language television premiere on Animax's English networks in Southeast Asia from June 2007, as well as networks in other regions, including South Korea and Hong Kong. Geneon USA had licensed the series for distribution across North America. A 2-episode original video animation (OVA) titled Fate/Stay Night: TV Reproduction, which recapped all the television series' episodes, was released in January 2010.

== Plot ==
The Fate/Stay Night anime series is set in Fuyuki City and follows Shirou Emiya, an orphaned teenager who had lost his parents in a Massive fire that engulfed nearly half the city ten years prior. He is reluctantly dragged into the Fifth Holy Grail War—a battle royale between mages known as Masters and Servants for the Holy Grail, which grants the wishes of the victor. After accidentally summoning the servant Saber to save his life, Shirou teams up with his fellow classmate, Rin Tohsaka, to stop the war and protect himself. During his battles with other participants, he attempts to protect others while grappling and struggling with his personal desire to be a hero and growing feelings for Saber. The series also focuses on the gradually developing relationship and progressing bond between Shirou and Saber, with the two growing to love one another and learning they must accept their pasts.

== Production ==
The Fate/Stay Night television series was a collaborative production between Studio Deen and the Fate Project, which consisted of multiple Japanese companies, including Frontier Works, CREi, Type-Moon, and Geneon Entertainment among others. The series' soundtrack would be handled by Kenji Kawai.

== Broadcast and distribution ==
A prequel original video animation (OVA) titled Fate/Stay Night: Curtain Raiser was produced by Studio Deen, and released in November 23, 2005. The 24-episode Fate/Stay Night anime television series was later directed by Yūji Yamaguchi, and produced by Fate Project; which consists of Geneon Entertainment, TBS, CREi, Type-Moon and Frontier Works. It aired on multiple television stations between January and June 2006.

Cover art for the complete DVD collection release of the anime

The series later received its international television premieres on the Japanese anime television network Animax in 2007, its English-language television premiere occurring on Animax's English networks in Southeast Asia in June, as well as its other networks in South Korea, Hong Kong and other regions. Geneon USA would also license the series for distribution across North America, while Crunchyroll licensed it in the Australasia region. The English dub was produced at Bang Zoom! Entertainment, headquartered in Burbank, California.

In July 2008, Geneon Entertainment and Funimation Entertainment announced an agreement to distribute select titles in North America. While Geneon Entertainment retained the license, Funimation Entertainment assumed exclusive rights to the manufacturing, marketing, sales, and distribution of select titles. In January 2010, an OVA titled Fate/Stay Night: TV Reproduction was released in two episodes. Fate/Stay Night: TV Reproduction I and II each recapped 12 episodes from the anime and feature re-edited and re-compiled footage along with new opening and ending animation footage, with new ending songs by Jyukai and Sachi Tainaka. Sentai Filmworks licensed the TV series and re-released it on DVD and Blu-ray Disc in January 2013.

=== Home media ===
The series' DVD releases were handled in Japan by Type-Moon. The series released in six volumes between March 28, 2006, and November 2, 2006. A complete box set containing the whole series was later released for Blu-ray in May 2023.

== Music ==
The anime's music is composed by Kenji Kawai, who had also provided the musical arrangement. While other musical themes were adapted from the original 2004 visual novel, scored by KATE and James Harris. The music was released through Geneon Entertainment. The opening themes "Disillusion" and "Kirameku Namida wa Hoshi ni" were sung by Sachi Tainaka, while the ending themes "Anata ga Ita Mori" and "Hikari", were performed by musical duo Jyukai. The anime's original soundtrack was released in June 2006, as a single-CD set.

== Reception ==
=== Critical response ===
The Fate/Stay Night anime television series had initially received positive reviews and acclaim in the beginning by critics and fans, before Ufotable's adaptation of the game's second route, which resulted in more mixed reviews from critics. It was met with multiple comments from staff of Anime News Network. In his review of the first DVD of Fate/Stay Night, Carl Kimlinger said that it was "an abundance of atmosphere and involvement". While Theron Martin, in his review of the first season of the first blu-ray collection, remarked that the season spends so much time establishing particulars and developing character relationships that it leaves almost no time for significant battles. In his review of the second season and the whole second collection, however, Martin noted that the series successfully accomplished its two goals: "dish out a lot of flashy, super-powered battles and develop the central relationship between Shirou and Saber". On the DVD Talk website, reviewer Todd Douglass Jr. praised the narrative, including the characters and the story: "The characters are interesting and the premise is compelling enough to create a rich atmosphere". Both Douglass and Martin agreed that a major strength in the anime was the sound and music quality.

=== Sales ===
The DVD and Blu-ray releases of the series had sold around 283,864 units in Japan. By March 2010, the DVD sales alone had exceeded 1 million. The first Fate/Stay Night Blu-ray Disc (BD) compilation volume had ranked in the top 10 of Anime News Network's Japan's Animation Blu-ray Disc Ranking in September 2010. By November 2011, it had about 5,768 copies in circulation. The Blu-ray collection for Fate/Stay Night: TV Reproduction I and II OVA ranked at 10th and 13th on the Oricon chart, and 11 and 12 on the Japan's Animation Blu-ray Disc Ranking respectively. The DVD volumes, however, ranked significantly higher than the BDs on Oricon. Volume one ranked at No. 5, volume two at No. 6, volume three and four at No. 4, volume five at No. 6, volume six at No. 2, volume seven at No. 4, and volume eight at No. 6. The opening and ending theme songs "Kirameku Namida wa Hoshi ni" and "Anata ga Ita Mori", debuted at No. 9 and 16 on Japan's Oricon weekly singles chart, respectively, both selling about 40,000 copies combined.
