= List of Fate/Stay Night episodes =

Cover art for the first home media volume of Fate/stay night, featuring Saber

Fate/stay night is a 2006 anime television series adapted from the titular visual novel by Type-Moon. The episodes are directed by Yūji Yamaguchi, animated by Studio Deen and produced by the Fate Project, which included Geneon Entertainment, TBS, CREi, Type-Moon and Frontier Works. The series premise is primarily based on the Fate storyline in the Fate/stay night visual novel, although certain elements of the other two storylines, Unlimited Blade Works and Heaven's Feel, are also incorporated into the anime.

The episodes were originally aired from January 7 to June 17, 2006, in Japan on Television Saitama and at later dates on CTC, KBS, tvk, Tokyo MX, SUN, TV Aichi and AT-X. The series later received its international television premieres on the anime television network Animax in 2007, also receiving its English-language television premiere on Animax's English networks in Southeast Asia from June 2007, as well as its other networks in South Korea, Hong Kong and other regions.

Five pieces of theme music are used for the series: two opening themes and three ending themes. The opening theme songs are the first two singles made by Japanese singer Sachi Tainaka: "Cisillusion", which is a remixed version of the visual novel's opening theme "This Illusion", is used for the first fourteen episodes, and "Kirameku Namida wa Hoshi ni" (きらめく涙は星に; lit. 'Glittering Tears Change to Stars') is used for the remaining episodes. The main ending theme song is "Anata ga Ita Mori" (あなたがいた森; lit. 'The Forest in Which You Were') performed by the J-pop band Jyukai, which was used for all episodes except episode fourteen and episode twenty-four. Episode 14 featured Jyukai's "Hikari" (ヒカリ; lit. 'Light') and episode 24 used Sachi Tainaka's "Kimi to no Ashita" (君との明日; lit. 'Tomorrow with You').

Eight DVD compilations, each containing three episodes, have been released by Type-Moon in Japan. The first of these compilations ranked number five on the Oricon listing charts as of April 5, 2006. Geneon Entertainment released six DVD compilations, each containing four episodes, in North America, with the sixth released on October 9, 2007. The original soundtrack for the episodes, containing forty tracks of music, was also released by Geneon Entertainment on January 16, 2007.

== Episodes ==
No.	Title	Directed by	Written by	Storyboarded by	Original release date
1	"The First Day"; Transliteration: "Hajimari no Hi" (Japanese: 始まりの日)	Shunji Yoshida	Takuya Satō	Yūji Yamaguchi	January 7, 2006
Ten years after surviving a catastrophic fire in Fuyuki City, Shirō Emiya, uses the magic taught by his late adoptive father to help others, striving to become a "hero of justice." While troubled by a sudden rise in local crime, he receives a cryptic warning from a mysterious silver-haired girl to summon a "Servant." Meanwhile, his classmate Rin Tōhsaka summons an Archer-class Servant, preparing herself for the upcoming Fifth Holy Grail War.
2	"Fateful Night"; Transliteration: "Unmei no Yoru" (Japanese: 運命の夜)	Masami Furukawa	Takuya Satō	Tetsuya Yanagisawa	January 14, 2006
Rin expresses her disappointment at not being able to summon a Saber-class Servant as she originally intended. She then asks Archer to reveal his real-life identity, but he is unable to recall his past. Later at school, Shirō Emiya stays late to clean the school's kyūdō after being requested by Sakura's older brother Shinji, and accidentally witnesses a supernatural duel between Archer and the Servant Lancer. Because innocent witnesses are forbidden, Lancer tracks down and fatally stabs Shirō. Rin finds his body and uses a powerful magical jewel to revive him out of pity. However, Lancer returns to Shirō's home to finish the job, forcing a desperate Shirō to accidentally summon Saber, the most powerful Servant. She saves his life from Lancer. Upon spotting her, he becomes astounded by her beauty.
3	"Opening Act"; Transliteration: "Kaimaku" (Japanese: 開幕)	Isao Takayama	Fumihiko Shimo	Yoshihiro Takamoto	January 21, 2006
As Saber battles Lancer, she is wounded by his Noble Phantasm, she deduces his identity as the Irish hero Cú Chulainn, but Lancer is ordered by his Master to retreat. After a confusing introduction between Shirō and Saber, where Shirō finds himself confused by Saber's strange terminology, she attacks the arriving Rin and Archer, badly injuring Archer before Shirō stops her. Realising Shirō is a clueless participant in the Fifth Holy Grail War, Rin takes him to the war's overseer and her guardian, Kirei Kotomine. Upon learning that the fire he survived ten years ago was caused by the previous war, Shirō decides to participate. Afterwards, Shirō, Saber, and Rin are confronted by a silver-haired girl and her massive Servant.
4	"The Strongest Enemy"; Transliteration: "Saikyō no Teki" (Japanese: 最強の敵)	Noriaki Akitaya	Mari Okada	Ryōji Fujiwara	January 28, 2006
The girl introduces herself as Illyasviel von Einzbern, and orders her Servant, the Berserker-class Greek hero Heracles, to attack the wounded Saber. Rin and Shirō are helpless as Berserker severely wounds Saber, prompting Shirō to step in and block a fatal blow intended for her. Puzzled by his actions, Illyasviel recalls Berserker and leaves. As Shirō lies dying, he flashes back to the night Kiritsugu passed away, remembering his vow to fulfill Kiritsugu's dream of becoming a hero of justice. The next day, Shirō wakes up at home to find his body miraculously healed, mirroring Saber's self-regeneration. Later, he connects with Saber in his dojo and, while walking back to the main house, begins contemplating his feelings toward her.
5	"Two Magi (Part 1)"; Transliteration: "Majutsushi Futari (Zenpen)" (Japanese: 魔術師二人〈前編〉)	Kunitoshi Okajima	Jukki Hanada	Mitsuru Kitaya	February 4, 2006
Feeling guilty about making Saber hide, Shirō introduces her to Sakura and Taiga during dinner as a distant relative of Kiritsugu. Taiga feels threatened and challenges Saber to a kendo duel, but loses quickly and accepts her staying. Meanwhile, while investigating city-wide gas leaks, Rin tells Archer she will kill Shirō if they cross paths again. The next morning, Shirō heads to school alone after Saber urges him to use a Command Seal to summon her if he faces danger. At school, he learns Mitsuzuri is missing and that Shinji is a suspect. Once school ends, Rin unexpectedly attacks Shirō, a chase witnessed by an unknown female Servant.
6	"Two Magi (Part 2)"; Transliteration: "Majutsushi Futari (Kōhen)" (Japanese: 魔術師二人〈後編〉)	Masami Furukawa	Takuya Satō	Masami Furukawa	February 11, 2006
Cornered by Rin, a fleeing Shirō refuses to surrender his Command Seals, prompting her to attack. Distracted by a scream downstairs, they find an unconscious girl. As Rin tries to heal her, Shirō blocks a dagger aimed at Rin with his arm, wounding himself. He runs outside, repelling an attack from the female Rider-class Servant. Though considering summoning Saber via Command Seal, Shirō decides it is too risky and resolves to confront Rider alone. Rider resumes her assault, nearly killing Shirō until Rin rescues him. At Rin's home, they form a temporary truce to find Rider's Master. Later, Rin learns about Shirō's magical training; she is jealous and infuriated that Kiritsugu prioritized fatherhood over magus responsibilities, unlike her own father. Archer later escorts Shirō home, expressing disapproval of his ideals and warning him that Saber will resent being kept from fighting due to his concern.
7	"Despicable Act"; Transliteration: "Shundō" (Japanese: 蠢動)	Shunji Yoshida	Jukki Hanada	Tetsuya Yanagisawa	February 18, 2006
Saber confronts Shirō for not summoning her against Rin and Rider, as well as deciding to ally with Rin after she had just attacked him, later insisting on accompanying him and Sakura to school. The tension rises when Rin stops by, lying that she and Shirō are walking together, causing a tearful Sakura to flee, believing they are dating. Rin then negotiates with Saber to walk with Shirō alone. At school, after reconciling with Sakura, Shirō learns from Rin that Mitsuzuri survived a Servant attack, presumably by Rider. Discovering Shirō can detect sigils from a magical barrier over the school, he and Rin destroy most of them before bonding over drinks, where Shirō learns about Rin's late father. At day's end, Shirō senses a massive sigil in the dojo, where he is confronted by Rider and her Master, Shinji.
8	"Discordant Melody"; Transliteration: "Fukyō no Oto" (Japanese: 不協の旋律)	Isao Takayama	Fumihiko Shimo	Takafumi Hoshikawa	February 25, 2006
Shinji defends placing the school barrier against Rin, denies attacking archery captain Ayako, and reveals the Matō mage lineage. Offering an alliance due to his own lack of magic, he is refused by Shirō. Later, Shirō relays Shinji's intel about a Master witch at Ryuudou Temple to Rin and Saber; Saber favors an immediate strike, but Shirō and Rin prioritize Illya and Berserker instead. Afterward, Rin moves into Shirō's house to ease communication, shocking Sakura and Taiga. Still clashing with Shirō over strategy, Saber ultimately disobeys him and heads to the temple alone.
9	"Elegance in the Moonlight"; Transliteration: "Gekka Ryūrei" (Japanese: 月下流麗)	Noriaki Akitaya	Mari Okada	Yoshihiro Takamoto	March 4, 2006
Arriving at Ryuudou Temple, Saber battles an Assassin-class Servant claiming to be Sasaki Kojirō, who is guarding the temple gateway. Simultaneously, Rider infiltrates Ryuudou Temple and clashes with Caster, while Saber struggles against Assassin and prepares to unleash her Noble Phantasm. Shirō rushes to the scene, inadvertently interrupting Saber's ultimate attack and causing her to collapse from mana exhaustion, though his arrival prompts the enemies to retreat. After Shirō carries her home to recover, Sabre criticises his reckless instinct to protect her; however, after Rin explains that Shirō simply hates seeing her get hurt, Saber agrees to train him in swordsmanship.
10	"The Calm Interlude"; Transliteration: "Odayaka na Makuai" (Japanese: 穏やかな幕間)	Kunitoshi Okajima	Takuya Satō	Ryōji Fujiwara	March 11, 2006
Shirō has his first training session with Saber but fares poorly against her in battle. That same day, Shirō meets Illya in town and they converse in the park. After he returns home, Rin tells Shirō to swallow a jewel, which switches on his power to use magic.
11	"Temple of Blood"; Transliteration: "Senketsu Shinden" (Japanese: 鮮血神殿)	Shigeru Ueda	Fumihiko Shimo	Shigeru Ueda	March 18, 2006
Shirou is tricked to come to school by Shinji, and he finds himself in the midst of a trap after the Blood Fort Andromeda is activated by Rider. He manages to hold his own against Shinji, however, Shinji orders Rider to kill him. Rider's blade is unable to deal Shirō a killing blow, so she kicks him out of the window. With Shirō's death imminent, he summons Saber just in time. Saber fights Rider, and Shirō defeats Shinji, forcing him to call off Blood Fort. Rider uses her Noble Phantasm to escape from the school.
12	"Splitting the Sky"; Transliteration: "Sora o Saku" (Japanese: 空を裂く)	Shunji Yoshida	Mari Okada	Tetsuya Yanagisawa	March 25, 2006
Shirō and Saber travel through town trying to find Shinji and Rider but are unsuccessful at first. When the fight between Saber and Rider commences, Saber is forced to unleash her Noble Phantasm, Excalibur, to defeat Rider, after her plan to defend to wait for an opportunity for Rider to be defenseless falls through when Shirō appears on the roof. Shirō carries Saber back after she collapses from using her Noble Phantasm.
13	"Winter Castle"; Transliteration: "Fuyu no Shiro" (Japanese: 冬の城)	Masami Furukawa	Takuya Satō	Ryōji Fujiwara	April 1, 2006
Rin tells Shirō he must use a command spell to make Saber assault humans to regain her mana. While Saber sleeps, Shirō glimpses her past, learning she pulled Caliburn from the stone to become King of Britain. Archer explains that Saber knew using her Noble Phantasm would make her disappear, yet she chose to protect Shirō over everything else. While Saber recovers, Illya captures Shirō and offers to make him her servant, which he refuses. Once Saber wakes, she, Rin, and Archer set out to rescue him.
14	"The End of The Ideal"; Transliteration: "Risō no Hate" (Japanese: 理想の果て)	Shunji Yoshida	Jukki Hanada	Yoshihiro Takamoto	April 8, 2006
Illyasviel sets Berserker on them, but Archer battles him so Rin, Shirō, and Saber can escape. Battered into the hall, Archer manages to defeat Berserker once. Illya is surprised when Archer calls her by her nickname, noting she is still merciless. Knowing he will ultimately lose, Archer resolves to deal maximum damage and deploys his Reality Marble Noble Phantasm. He takes five of Berserker’s lives before being defeated. Consequently, Rin’s last Command Spell vanishes, and Saber collapses in the forest.
15	"The Twelve Trials"; Transliteration: "Jūni no Shiren" (Japanese: 十二の試練)	Kunitoshi Okajima	Fumihiko Shimo	Yumi Kamakura	April 15, 2006
In order to replenish Saber's mana, Shirō gives a part of his magical circuit to Saber, which means that he will never be able to use some sorcery or be on par with other magicians. After the transfer, Illya and Berserker come back for a final match.
16	"The Sword of a Promised Victory"; Transliteration: "Yakusoku Sareta Shōri no Ken" (Japanese: 約束された勝利の剣)	Kōsuke Kobayashi	Mari Okada	Ryōji Fujiwara & Yūji Yamaguchi	April 22, 2006
After Shirō manages to trace a sword powerful enough to defeat Berserker - Caliburn, he and Saber work together to defeat him. Afterwards, Shirō takes Illya home with him.
17	"The Mark of the Witch"; Transliteration: "Majo no Rakuin" (Japanese: 魔女の烙印)	Shigeru Ueda	Takuya Satō	Shigeru Ueda	April 29, 2006
With mass comas now occurring within the city, Shirō and the others decide to go after the Master and Servants at the Ryudōji shrine. After confirming that Sōichirō Kuzuki, one of Shirō's teachers, is Caster's Master, Sakura is taken captive by Caster to serve as a sacrifice in order to summon the Holy Grail.
18	"Decisive Battle"; Transliteration: "Kessen" (Japanese: 決戦)	Shunji Yoshida	Jukki Hanada	Tetsuya Yanagisawa	May 6, 2006
Shirō, Rin and Saber attempt to rescue Sakura and to stop the Holy Grail from being summoned. While Saber fights Assassin, Shirō attempts to fend off Kuzuki, and Rin tries to save Sakura.
19	"The Golden King"; Transliteration: "Ōgon no Ō" (Japanese: 黄金の王)	Shigeru Ueda	Fumihiko Shimo	Yoshihiro Takamoto & Yūji Yamaguchi	May 13, 2006
With victory all but won for Caster, an eighth Servant in golden armor appears and kills Caster and Kuzuki. After Shirō and the others escape, Saber reveals who this new Servant is and how she knows him.
20	"Distant Trace of a Dream"; Transliteration: "Tōi Yume Ato" (Japanese: 遠い夢跡)	Kunitoshi Okajima	Mari Okada	Mitsuru Kitaya	May 20, 2006
Upon realizing his feelings for Saber, Shirō asks her to go out on a date with him around town. Afterwards, they get in a fight and Shirō ends up running off back to his house.
21	"The Star of Creation That Divided Heaven and Earth"; Transliteration: "Tenchi Kairisu Kaibyaku no Hoshi" (Japanese: 天地乖離す開闢の星)	Isao Takayama	Jukki Hanada	Takafumi Hoshikawa	May 27, 2006
While walking back home together, Shirō and Saber are attacked by the Servant Gilgamesh, who had previously saved them from Kuzuki and Caster. After Shirō traces a sheath for Excalibur, they manage to repel him. Later that night, Shirō makes his feelings clear to Saber and tells her that he wants her to stay with him after the war is over.
22	"The Result of a Wish"; Transliteration: "Negai no Hate" (Japanese: 願いの果て)	Shigeru Ueda	Takuya Satō	Mitsuru Kitaya, Yoshihiro Takamoto & Yūji Yamaguchi	June 3, 2006
After going to Kirei's church, Shirō is captured and nearly killed by Kirei, but Saber comes in time and heals his wounds. Kirei orders Lancer and Gilgamesh to kill Shirō and Saber, but Lancer battles Gilgamesh in order to allow the two to escape. He is subsequently overwhelmed by Gilgamesh and slain.
23	"The Holy Grail"; Transliteration: "Seihai" (Japanese: 聖杯)	Shunji Yoshida	Fumihiko Shimo	Tetsuya Yanagisawa	June 10, 2006
After Illya is taken by Kirei, Shirō and Saber head to the Ryudōji shrine in order to defeat him. Saber fights with Gilgamesh while Shirō goes after Kirei.
24	"The All Too Distant Utopia"; Transliteration: "Subete Tōki Risōkyō" (Japanese: 全て遠き理想郷)	Yūji Yamaguchi	Mari Okada	Ryōji Fujiwara & Yūji Yamaguchi	June 17, 2006
By combining their powers, Shirō and Saber are able to defeat Gilgamesh and Kirei together. The final order Shirō commands to Saber is to destroy the Holy Grail. As Saber disappears, she admits her love for Shirō. An epilogue then takes place, with everyone everyone returns to their normal lives as if waking from a long dream. Shirō is satisfied with his life, forever remembering Saber while enjoying a good life with Rin, Illya, Sakura, and Taiga. Meanwhile, Saber returns to her own time and tells Bedivere she had a wonderful dream. When she asks if one can relive dreams, Bedivere replies "of course." She then orders Bedivere to return Excalibur to the Lady of the Lake. Moments after he accomplishes the task, Saber peacefully dies under a tree.

== DVDs and Blu-ray ==
=== Original release ===
Name	Date	Discs	Episodes
Volume 1	March 29, 2006	1	1–3
Volume 2	April 28, 2006	1	4–6
Volume 3	May 31, 2006	1	7–9
Volume 4	June 28, 2006	1	10–12
Volume 5	July 26, 2006	1	13–15
Volume 6	August 30, 2006	1	16–18
Volume 7	September 27, 2006	1	19–21
Volume 8	November 2, 2006	1	22–24

=== English release ===
Blu-ray boxes

Name	Date	Discs	Episodes
Complete Collection	May 2, 2023	3	1-24
