= Love Is =

Love Is may refer to:

== Music ==
- Love Is (record label), a Thai record label

=== Albums ===
- Love Is (The Animals album), 1968
- Love Is (Kevin Sharp album), 1998
- Love Is (Kim Wilde album), 1992
- Love Is (Ruben Studdard album), 2009
- Love Is (Steve Howe album), 2020
- Love Is (EP), by MiChi, or the title song, 2010
- Love Is… (Sachi Tainaka album), 2008
- Love Is... (Toni Gonzaga album), 2008
- Love Is..., by Jennylyn Mercado, 2010
- Love Is..., by Sammi Cheng, 2000

=== Songs ===
- "Love Is" (Alannah Myles song), 1989
- "Love Is" (Vanessa Williams and Brian McKnight song), 1993
- "Love Is" (Vikki Watson song), 1985
- "Love Is", by the Brothers Johnson from Right on Time, 1977
- "Love Is", by Itzy from Crazy in Love, 2021
- "Love Is", by Kara from Jumping, 2010
- "Love Is", by Kate and Anna McGarrigle from Heartbeats Accelerating, 1990
- "Love Is", by Katrina Elam, 2006
- "Love Is", by Mango Groove from Mango Groove, 1989
- "Love Is", by R. Kelly, featuring K. Michelle, from Love Letter, 2010
- "Love Is", by R. Kelly from Write Me Back, 2012
- "Love Is", by Ringo Starr from Liverpool 8, 2008
- "Love is," by Stevie Nicks from Trouble in Shangri-La, 2001
- "Love Is", by Whitney Houston from The Concert for a New South Africa (Durban), 2024
- "Love Is..." (song), by King Missile, 1994
- "Love Is...", by the Beautiful South from Welcome to the Beautiful South, 1989
- "Love Is...", by Common from Be, 2005
- "Love is...", by Indian singer Shakthisree Gopalan, 2022
- "Love Is...", by Toosii from Naujour, 2023
- "Love Is (What I Say)", by INXS from The Swing, 1984

== Other uses ==
- Love Is (TV series), a 2018 American drama series
- Love Is..., a comic strip
- Love Is... (film), a 2017 Filipino television film

== See also ==
- Luv Is, a 2023 Philippine drama anthology TV series
