= Love Is... (Sachi Tainaka album) =

- Regular Edition

Studio album by Sachi Tainaka
- Released: February 13, 2008
- Genre: J-Pop
- Length: TBR
- Label: Sistus Records

Sachi Tainaka chronology
Dear... (2007)	Love Is... (2008)

Alternative cover
- CD+DVD Edition

Love Is... is an album by J-pop singer, Sachi Tainaka. It is her second studio album under the Sistus Records label. It was released on February 13, 2008 with a regular (CD Only) edition and a limited (CD+DVD) edition that contains the music videos of her first 4 released singles. It reached the 30th place on the Oricon Weekly Albums Chart.

The catalog number for the regular edition is GNCX-1006 while the limited edition is GNCX-1005

The album covers her three latest singles, Itoshii Hito e, Lipstick/Ichiban Boshi and Visit of love.

== CD track listing ==
1. Visit of love
2. Delight
3. Lipstick
4. Sayonara (サヨナラ)
5. Dakishimete (抱きしめて)
6. Ichiban Boshi (一番星)
7. HOME
8. My Darling
9. Nukegara (抜け殻)
10. Sakura mau (桜舞う)
11. Itoshii Hito e (愛しい人へ)
12. Michi (道)

== DVD track listing ==
1. disillusion (PV)
2. Kirameku Namida wa Hoshi ni (PV)
3. Saikō no Kataomoi (PV)
4. Aitai yo. (PV)
