= Therapy (MiChi album) =

Studio album by MiChi
- Released: 21 March 2012
- Recorded: 2010–2012
- Genre: Dance, dance-pop, J-Pop, pop rock, electronic
- Label: Sony Music Entertainment
- Producer: Tomokazu Matsuzawa, Leo Imai

MiChi chronology
| Love Is (2010) | Therapy (2012) |

Singles from Therapy
- 1. "Together Again" Released: 21 April 2010; 2. "Wonder Woman" Released: 23 June 2010; 3. "Love Is" Released: 22 December 2010; 4. "One" Released: 22 June 2011; 5. "Find Your Way" Released: 30 November 2011; 6. "Tokyo Night" Released: 1 February 2012

Therapy is the second major label studio album released by British-Japanese musician MiChi, to be released on 21 March 2012 by Sony Music Entertainment. The record features just six previously unheard songs, after the remaining seven were released to the public as tracks on the various singles and EPs released in the lead up to the album's release. The album continues MiChi's tradition of including another addition to the "MadNesS Vol." series, with this being the third entrant, after the two previous released on Michi Madness and Up to You.

Three versions of the album are being released; a standard CD edition, and two special editions; Type A will include an additional DVD featuring six of MiCho's music videos, while Type B will be packaged with an additional CD with a seven-track remix bundle, with one of the remixes being provided by the French Ed Banger Record label, mixed by Busy P and DSL.

== Reception ==
The album received an extremely positive critical reception, with critics appreciating MiChi experimenting with the boundaries of J-Pop, while still maintaining a radio-friendly sound.

Japan-focused blog Tokyohive, when "Love Is" and "Yeah Yeah Yeah!!!" were released on the Love Is EP, gave the tracks a positive review; stating "If you like dance pop music, then you'll like this". They went on the describe each song in detail, "Love Is" (typeset as "LOVE is"), reminds of an early nineties song that belongs in Flashdance. The second track, "Yeah Yeah Yeah!!!" (typeset as "YEAH YEAH YEAH!!!"), is your typical pop song with a catchy melody and something you'd sing in karaoke."

In another review by The Japan Times, reviewer Patrick St. Michel declares "2012 has its first great J-pop album. Her sophomore full-length 'Therapy' rarely strays from the preferred commercial format — peppy pop numbers coupled with ballads. But MiChi refreshes this dusty blueprint without sacrificing catchiness — and so pointing a better way for J-pop."

== Track listing ==
| No. | Title | Length |
|---|---|---|
| 1. | "Madness Vol.3" | 2:33 |
| 2. | "Tokyo Night" | 4:48 |
| 3. | "Love Is" | 4:55 |
| 4. | "Together Again" | 4:28 |
| 5. | "Yeah Yeah Yeah!!!" | 5:30 |
| 6. | "Special Someone" | 3:56 |
| 7. | "Wonder Woman" | 3:33 |
| 8. | "Light Up" | 4:21 |
| 9. | "Take It Easy!" | 4:09 |
| 10. | "Motto" | 4:22 |
| 11. | "Find Your Way" | 4:10 |
| 12. | "Therapy" | 4:44 |
| 13. | "One" | 5:06 |
| Total length: | | 56:40 |

DVD Music Videos
| No. | Title | Length |
|---|---|---|
| 1. | "Together again" |
| 2. | "Wonder Woman" |
| 3. | "Love Is" |
| 4. | "One" |
| 5. | "Find Your Way" |
| 6. | "Tokyo Night" |

Disc 2 Remix Bundle
| No. | Title | Length |
|---|---|---|
| 1. | "Fxxk You And Your Money (Ed Banger All Stars remix remixed by Busy P & DSL at DSL LAB in Paris）" | 4:02 |
| 2. | "Promise [Smart Sports ver.]" | 5:38 |
| 3. | "Hey Girl [XB remix]" | 5:07 |
| 4. | "Change the World [remix]" | 3:48 |
| 5. | "You (version 3.1)" | 3:19 |
| 6. | "Wonder Woman (T.O.M remix)" | 5:23 |
| 7. | "Yeah Yeah Yeah!!! (Remix)" | 5:18 |

== Charts ==
| Chart | Peak position |
|---|---|
| Oricon Daily Chart | 22 |
