= Takuya Satō =

Takuya Satō may refer to:

- Takuya Satō (director) (佐藤 卓哉), Japanese anime screenwriter and director
- Takuya Satō (voice actor) (佐藤 拓也, born 1984), Japanese voice actor

== See also ==
- Takuma Sato (1977), Japanese professional racing driver
