= Manami Watanabe =

Manami Watanabe 渡辺 愛未
- Also known as: Aimmy (アイミ, Aimi) (her stage name)
- Born: December 28, 1986 (age 39)
- Origin: Osaka Prefecture, Japan
- Genres: Japanese Pop
- Occupations: Singer, songwriter
- Years active: 2001–present
- Label: Sistus Records
- Member of: Jyukai
- Website: aimmy.jp

Manami Watanabe (渡辺 愛未, Watanabe Manami) (born December 28, 1986, in Osaka Prefecture, Japan) is the female lead singer of Jyukai, a Japanese pop/soft rock group.

== Biography ==
At an early age, she aspired to be a singer. While she was an elementary pupil, she practiced songwriting and idolized Speed and Namie Amuro.

In 2003, she met her friend, fellow music addict Yoshiaki Dewa. A year later, they formed Jyukai and started doing gigs at Osaka. They were signed by Sistus Records in 2006, while Manami was signed solo at the same label two years later.

She composes her band's songs as the vocalist/composer.

== Solo discography ==
=== Singles ===
"Blue Vibration/Kaze no Memori/to the end of the world" (September 24, 2008, Sistus Records, GNCX-0015)
