= Playful Relationships =

Japanese light novel series

- First light novel volume cover

あそびのかんけい (Asobi no Kankei)
- Genre: Romantic comedy
- Light novel
- Written by: Sekina Aoi
- Illustrated by: Kurehito Misaki
- Published by: Fujimi Shobo
- English publisher: NA: Yen Press
- Imprint: Fujimi Fantasia Bunko
- Original run: May 20, 2025 – present
- Volumes: 4
- Manga
- Written by: Sekina Aoi
- Illustrated by: Koruri
- Published by: Hakusensha
- Magazine: Young Animal
- Original run: September 25, 2026 – present

Playful Relationships (Japanese: あそびのかんけい, Hepburn: Asobi no Kankei) is a Japanese light novel series written by Sekina Aoi and illustrated by Kurehito Misaki. Fujimi Shobo began publishing it under its Fujimi Fantasia Bunko imprint in May 2025, with four volumes released as of August 2026. A manga adaptation illustrated by Koruri began serialization in Hakusensha's Young Animal magazine in September 2026.

== Plot ==
The series follows Kotarō Tokiwa, a high school dropout who currently works at a board game store in Tokyo. He falls in love with his co-worker Mifuru Takanashi, but keeps his crush on her to himself. However, he becomes discouraged after learning that Mifuru has a boyfriend named Itsuki Usa. Disappointed to learn this, Kotarō claims that he is actually in love with Tsukino Utakata, a well-known shogi player. However, unknown to the both of them, both are actually lying about their respective relationships: Itsuki is actually a secret identity of Tsukino.

== Characters ==
Kotarō Tokiwa (常盤 孤太郎, Tokiwa Kotarō)
The assistant manager of Kurumaza, a board game cafe located in Ogikubo, Tokyo. He dropped out of high school and currently works as the cafe, often doing most of the work whenever the manager is absent. He is skilled at and knowledgeable about board games. He has a crush on Mifuru but is discouraged after finding out about her relationship.
Mifuru Takanashi (小鳥遊 みふる, Takanashi Mifuru)
Voiced by: Hikaru Tono (PV)
A cheerful high school girl who works at Kurumaza. She has the appearance and personality of a gyaru, and has a large social media following. She started working at the cafe following an encounter with Tokiwa, but in contrast to him, has little interest for board games themselves. She is pretending to date a man named Itsuki Usa, much to Kotarō's chagrin. She actually has an interest in Tokiwa but is unable to express it further due to her own relationship with Itsuki.
Tsukino Utakata (歌方 月乃, Utakata Tsukino)
Voiced by: Hina Yōmiya (PV)
A popular shogi player who goes to an all-girls school. After passing by Kurumaza, she becomes a regular customer. However, she puts up a disguise and goes by the name Utamaru. She also works as a rental boyfriend under the name Itsuki Usa (宇 佐樹, Usa Itsuki), maintaining a boyish appearance while dating Kotarō. Although she was initially Mifuru's rental boyfriend, she later develops feelings for Kotarō after hanging out with him.
Momoa Takeshi (武士 萌々愛, Takeshi Momoa)
Voiced by: Yūko Natsuyoshi (PV)
Kotarō's best friend and a track-and-field athlete. Despite going to the same school, they did not meet until after Kotarō dropped out, when she discovered board games while recovering from an injury. Because of her interest in board games, she temporarily retired from track-and-field, although she was later encouraged to resume her career.
Akari Hankui (半杭 朱里, Hankui Akari)
Voiced by: Reina Ueda (PV)
Momoa's fellow track-and-field athlete, who has feelings for her. She distrusts Kotarō due to Momoa's increasing interest in board games, and blames him for Momoa's withdrawal from the track-and-field team.

== Development ==
Aoi had plans to write a story around board games since 2018. He long had an interest in board games but acknowledged his lack of skill in them. He noted how his light novel series Gamers! had little focus on video games, despite its title, so he thought that making a series called Board Gamers! using a similar premise would not work. Nevertheless, he had ideas on how to write such a story, including wondering if it could go without romantic comedy elements.

== Media ==
=== Light novel ===
The series is written by Sekina Aoi, who had previously written the light novel series Student Council's Discretion and Gamers!. It is illustrated by Kurehito Misaki, who previously worked on the light novel series Saekano. It is published by Fujimi Shobo under their Fujimi Fantasia Bunko imprint, with the first novel being published on May 20, 2025. A promotional video featuring Hikaru Tono as Mifuru was released to promote the volume's release. Four volumes have been published as of August 20, 2026. The series is licensed in English by Yen Press, which will release the first volume in December 2026.

No.	Original release date	Original ISBN	English release date	English ISBN
1	May 20, 2025	978-4-0407-5861-9	December 8, 2026	979-8-85-543628-0
2	September 20, 2025	978-4-0407-6130-5	—	—
3	March 19, 2026	978-4-0407-6300-2	—	—
4	August 20, 2026	978-4-0407-6547-1	—	—

=== Manga ===
A manga adaptation illustrated by Koruri was announced on March 20, 2026. It began serialization in Hakusensha's Young Animal magazine on September 25, 2026.

== Reception ==
The series won three awards in the 2026 edition of Kono Light Novel ga Sugoi!, ranking first overall, as well as placing first in the paperback and new release categories.

== See also ==
- Gamers!, another light novel series written by Sekina Aoi
- Grow Up Show, an anime television series with character designs by Kurehito Misaki
- My Crush's Crush, a manga series written by Sekina Aoi
- Saekano, another light novel series illustrated by Kurehito Misaki
- Student Council's Discretion, another light novel series written by Sekina Aoi
