= My Crush's Crush =

Japanese manga series

- First tankōbon volume cover

ぼくの好きな人が好きな人 (Boku no Suki na Hito ga Suki na Hito)
- Genre: Romantic comedy
- Manga
- Written by: Sekina Aoi
- Illustrated by: Ryō Tsuzura
- Published by: Hakusensha
- English publisher: NA: Yen Press
- Imprint: Young Animal Comics
- Magazine: Young Animal Zero
- Original run: November 9, 2022 – present
- Volumes: 7
- Anime television series
- Directed by: Kazuomi Koga
- Written by: Yoriko Tomita
- Music by: Rina Tayama
- Studio: Project No.9
- Original run: April 2027 – scheduled
- icon

My Crush's Crush (Japanese: ぼくの好きな人が好きな人, Hepburn: Boku no Suki na Hito ga Suki na Hito) is a Japanese manga series written by Sekina Aoi and illustrated by Ryō Tsuzura. It began serialization in Hakusensha's Young Animal Zero magazine in November 2022, and has been compiled into seven volumes as of August 2026. An anime television series adaptation produced by Project No.9 is set to premiere in April 2027.

== Plot ==
Sora Akizuki, a high school student, asks his schoolmate Miya Fuwa to be his girlfriend, only to be rejected by her. Undeterred, he learns from Miya's older sister Mahiru that Miya has a crush on someone else. Sora discovers that Miya's crush is a female student named Asahi Suzukaze, the leader of the mysterious Clinical Trials Club. Asahi claims to herself have a crush on someone else, and claiming that she would be forced to give up the club's room if she does not find more members, convinces Sora to join the club. Unknown to Sora, he is in fact the person that Asahi has feelings for.

== Characters ==
Sora Akizuki (秋月 奏良, Akizuki Sora)
Voiced by: Gakuto Kajiwara
A second-year high school student who has had feelings for Miya Fuwa for some time. He had developed a sense of responsibility ever since his younger brother's death. After finding out that Asahi is Miya's crush, Asahi offers to serve as his relationship coach to help him get into a relationship. When he was a kid, he visited Asahi in the hospital and accidentally drank her medicine, leading to Asahi developing feelings for him.
Asahi Suzukaze (涼風 朝陽, Suzukaze Asahi)
Voiced by: Haruna Mikawa
A third-year high school student and the leader and initially the only member of the Clinical Trials Club. Six years prior, she had been sick but her life was saved by a clinical trial, which inspired her to become interested in trials and tests. She also had an encounter with a young boy at the hospital and had been looking for him ever since. Unbeknownst to her, the boy was actually Sora. She calls Sora "Sorapoyo".
Miya Fuwa (不破 美夜, Fuwa Miya)
Voiced by: Nene Hieda
A first-year high school student and the younger sister of Sora's classmate and childhood friend Mahiru. Sora had a crush on her, but she rejected him when he confessed. She knows that Sora was the boy Asahi met in the past and the one Asahi had feelings for, leading her to act cold towards Sora.
Mahiru Fuwa (不破 真昼, Fuwa Mahiru)
Miya's older sister and Sora's classmate and childhood friend. She had been warned him not to bother confessing to Miya, knowing about Miya having feelings for someone else.
Yuu Kaminaga (神永 夕, Kaminaga Yū)
Sora's friend and classmate.

== Production ==
Sekina Aoi, a novelist who had previously written the light novel series Student Council's Discretion and Gamers!, originally began working on the series after being approached by the publishing company Hakusensha about an offer to write a romantic comedy manga. Aoi decided on the title first before writing the first chapter, with the characters and setting being fleshed out afterwards. The series' illustrator Ryō Tsuzura took the job after being offered by their editor. They initially hesitated as they had previously not worked on series where they illustrated for others, as well as lacking experience in doing romantic comedies with male leads, but ultimately accepted the offer. For the first chapter, Aoi started writing from the title drop and wrote backwards: this led to Miya only speaking at the end of the chapter.

== Media ==
=== Manga ===
Written by Sekina Aoi and illustrated by Ryō Tsuzura, the series began illustration in Hakusensha's Young Animal Zero magazine on November 9, 2022. The first tankōbon volume was released on October 27, 2023; seven volumes have been released as of August 28, 2026.

During their panel at Anime NYC 2026, Yen Press announced that they had licensed the series for English publication.

No.	Original release date	Original ISBN	English release date	English ISBN
1	October 27, 2023	978-4-592-16011-3	February 23, 2027	979-8-8554-2941-1
2	December 27, 2023	978-4-592-16012-0	—	—
3	July 29, 2024	978-4-592-16013-7	—	—
4	February 28, 2025	978-4-592-16014-4	—	—
5	August 29, 2025	978-4-592-16015-1	—	—
6	February 27, 2026	978-4-592-16019-9	—	—
7	August 28, 2026	978-4-592-16046-5	—	—

=== Anime ===
An anime television series adaptation was announced on August 28, 2026. It will be produced by Project No.9 and directed by Kazuomi Koga, with Yoriko Tomita handling series composition, Takayuki Noguchi designing the characters, and Rina Tayama composing the music. The series is set to premiere in April 2027.

== See also ==
- Gamers!, a light novel series by the same writer
- Playful Relationships, a light novel series by the same writer
- Student Council's Discretion, a light novel series by the same writer
