= Dear... (Sachi Tainaka album) =

Studio album by Sachi Tainaka
- Released: March 7, 2007
- Genre: JPop
- Label: Sistus Records

Sachi Tainaka chronology
Dear... (2007)	Love is... (2008)

"Dear..." is an album from Sachi Tainaka that was released on March 7, 2007. It reached the 33rd place on the Oricon Weekly Albums Chart.

Its catalog number is GNCX-1002.

== Track listing ==
1. プロローグ ～Trust you～
2. 最高の片想い
3. 笑顔が戻ってきた!!!
4. Cry
5. それでも
6. アリの夢
7. 独り占めしたい
8. Happy Song
9. 会いたいよ。
10. Symphony of Fate disillusion～きらめく涙は星に
11. mother
