= Gamers! =

Japanese light novel series

- First light novel volume cover

ゲーマーズ! (Gēmāzu!)
- Genre: Romantic comedy
- Light novel
- Written by: Sekina Aoi
- Illustrated by: Saboten
- Published by: Fujimi Shobo
- Imprint: Fujimi Fantasia Bunko
- Original run: March 20, 2015 – October 19, 2019
- Volumes: 12
- Manga
- Written by: Sekina Aoi
- Illustrated by: Tsubasa Takahashi
- Published by: Kadokawa Shoten
- Magazine: Monthly Shōnen Ace
- Original run: October 26, 2016 – July 26, 2019
- Volumes: 7
- Anime television series
- Directed by: Manabu Okamoto
- Produced by: Mitsutoshi Ogura; Tatsuya Suguri; Tsuyoshi Sōda; Takema Okamura; Hirotaka Kaneko; Tomoyuki Ohwada; Katsumi Kikumasa; Kazuhiro Kanemitsu
- Written by: Hiroki Uchida
- Music by: Yoshiaki Dewa
- Studio: Pine Jam
- Licensed by: Crunchyroll
- Original network: AT-X, Tokyo MX, Sun TV, BS11
- Original run: July 13, 2017 – September 28, 2017
- Episodes: 12
- Light novel

Gamers! DLC
- Written by: Sekina Aoi
- Illustrated by: Saboten
- Published by: Fujimi Shobo
- Imprint: Fujimi Fantasia Bunko
- Original run: September 20, 2017 – March 19, 2020
- Volumes: 3
- icon

Gamers! (Japanese: ゲーマーズ!, Hepburn: Gēmāzu!) is a Japanese light novel series, written by Sekina Aoi and illustrated by Saboten. Fujimi Shobo published twelve volumes from March 2015 to October 2019, under the Fujimi Fantasia Bunko imprint. An anime television series adaptation produced by Pine Jam aired from July to September 2017.

== Plot ==
Keita Amano, a high school student and gamer, meets the beautiful school idol Karen Tendō, who invites him to the school's Gaming Club. After finding it is centered around competitive gaming, he declines her offer. This rejection sets off a chain of events in the lives of Keita and his friends, in matters of video games, romance, and misunderstandings along the way.

== Characters ==
Each characters take turns narrating the chapters in the light novels.

=== Main characters ===
Keita Amano (雨野 景太, Amano Keita)
Voiced by: Megumi Han (Japanese); Brandon McInnis (English)
A second-year high school boy and video game player. He plays a handheld console or mobile. He considers Karen Tendo to be the perfect girl, but declines her invitation to join the Game Club, because he prefers to play games for fun and dislikes competitive playing. As a result, he has nearly every video game but not high scorer, but manages to have great insight into them. Keita often thinks of himself as unworthy to Karen (oblivious to their relationship) and initially would prefer to merely be her friend but is encouraged by Tasuku to accompany Karen by asking her out, even though he initially does not want to.^{LN 1} In later episodes, he likes to compete and win. He uses two online usernames, Tsucchi and Yama, both of which are based on his mother's maiden name Tsuchiyama. He is a big fan of independent game designer "Nobe", and teams up with online player Mono.^{Ep. 3} He is selfish, when it comes to his opinions on games, accompanying Chiaki Hoshinomori regularly over the use of moe characters and other things, even though the two are very much alike.^{Ep. 3, 5} In the light novel, Keita has a younger brother.^{LN 1}
Karen Tendo (天道 花憐, Tendō Karen)
Voiced by: Hisako Kanemoto (Note: Risa Taneda voiced Karen Tendo in a 2015 television commercial) (Japanese); Brittney Karbowski (English)
The most beautiful girl and the president of the school's Game Club. She has long blond hair and green eyes. (Note: Keita describes Karen's eyes as light blue in the first novel, although the cover suggests they are more aqua^{LN 1} while the manga and anime list her eye color as green.^{Ch. 1}^{Ep. 1}) She excels in school from look, and popularity to sports and academics.^{LN 1}^{Ep. 1} She attended the school because of the club's prestige, but its senior members had left, so she took it upon herself to revive the club, and she recruits members as she does not want it to be filled with guys who are only interested in asking her out.^{LN 1} At the beginning of the series, she invites Keita to join the club, and becomes upset when he declines her offer, having not faced rejection before in her life. This results in Karen stalking Keita to try and convince him to change his mind, but she develops a crush on him because he stands up to Tasuku in defending her and the club.^{LN 1} Following her newfound infatuation, her entire daily routine crumbles apart and she keeps thinking about him.^{Ep. 4} For a time, she mistakenly believes Keita and Chiaki are a couple.^{Ep. 3–5} In the anime series, Karen and Keita became friends.^{Ep. 6-7} Karen is extremely competitive, often turning the most mundane of activities into some kind of competition. However, she learns to loosen up and live more casually through Keita.
Chiaki Hoshinomori (星ノ守 千秋, Hoshinomori Chiaki)
Voiced by: Manaka Iwami (Japanese); Marissa Lenti (English)
A shy and quiet girl with long seaweed hair and purple eyes. She attends the school in Karen's class. She enjoys playing handheld and phone games like Keita, leading Tasuku to try and set them up so he can pair Keita with Karen. At first, Chiaki and Keita get along, because they agree about video games. However, they became rivals over their opinions on putting moe characters on each games. She takes Tasuku's advice on improving her appearance, and cuts her hair, inadvertently making her seen as attractive by the student body, but her increased interactions with Tasuku make Aguri jealous.^{Ep. 3} She is Keita's online friend "Mono" and his favorite indie game developer "Nobe", although Chiaki and Keita are unaware of each other's online personas.^{Ep. 5} She is shocked when Keita reveals his gaming usernames to the group, and begins to develop feelings for him.^{Ep. 8}
Tasuku Uehara (上原 祐, Uehara Tasuku)
Voiced by: Toshiyuki Toyonaga (Japanese); Clifford Chapin (English)
Keita's classmate and a good-looking outgoing guy. He is an occasional gamer and is skilled at arcade games. A former gamer nerd in middle school, he changed his appearance and attitude when he entered high school to avoid being stigmatized, yet feels drawn to be involved in Keita and his situation with Karen he is willing to help Keita progress in his social life, seeing himself in Keita.^{LN 1} He is quite proud he has a cute girlfriend Aguri, but later learns she had liked him when he was a nerd.^{Ep. 2} Tasuku is the first to make the connection between Keita and Chiaki's gaming personas, and tries to pair the two together as friends, while Keita makes a relationship with Karen. However, he creates a Gamers Meet-Up Club with all parties involved, his efforts, and increasing interactions with Chiaki and Karen, lead to their misunderstandings.^{Ep. 5}
Aguri Sakurano (桜野 亜玖璃, Sakurano Aguri)
Voiced by: Rumi Okubo (Japanese); Tia Ballard (English)
Tasuku's girlfriend. In the anime, she is a petite girl with pink hair and purple eyes. Unlike other characters, she does not play video games outside of claw machine games, which she frequently has Tasuku take part in so her can get her prizes, as he is far more skilled than she is. She fell in love with Tasuku, after getting a plushie doll from him at middle school, and she changed her appearance in order to get near him.^{Ep. 2} She becomes upset at Tasuku for accompanying Chiaki, but allies with Keita to help him relate better with Karen. The two end up becoming each other's confidante over their relationship troubles, only for their interactions to have their misunderstandings.

=== Supporting characters ===
Eiichi Misumi (三角 瑛一, Misumi Eiichi)
Voiced by: Natsuki Hanae (Japanese); Howard Wang (English)
Karen's classmate with a short black hair. He joins the Game Club at the start of the series. His specialty is in arcade puzzle video games, but he adapts to learning new ones and growing skills based on observing how others play. He says that he got into gaming, because he had amnesia when he was young and playing block puzzles gives him a link to his past.^{Ep. 1} In the final episode of the anime series, he has an adoptive sister Riki.^{Ep. 12}
Gakuto Kase (加瀬 岳人, Kase Gakuto)
Voiced by: Yasuaki Takumi (Japanese); Alejandro Saab (English)
A third-year student and a member of the Game Club. He gets serious when playing a first-person shooter game. He took up gaming because his father was a mercenary who trained him in the family business when he was a child.^{Ep. 1}
Niina Oiso (大磯 新那, Ōiso Niina)
Voiced by: Yuna Yoshino (Japanese); Dawn M. Bennett (English)
A third-year member of the Game Club who specializes in fighting games. Karen considers her the sexy big sister type. She has long brown hair and eyes. She does not talk to people, while playing. Karen said she got into gaming in order to win her friend back by trying to defeat her in the game.^{Ep. 1}
Konoha Hoshinomori (星ノ守 心春, Hoshinomori Konoha)
Voiced by: Yūki Kuwahara (Japanese); Jad Saxton (English)
Chiaki's younger sister. She is envious of Karen's popularity and is somewhat happy that she cannot compete with her by going to a different school, where she could become a student council president. She secretly enjoys adult games and revels in being in the company of girls.^{Ep. 8} When Keita inadvertently sees the names for "Mono" and "Nobe", it is revealed that Konoha had made them.^{Ep. 9} She helps Chiaki make friends with Keita.

== Media ==
=== Light novel ===
Sekina Aoi published the series in 2015 through Fujimi Shobo's Fujimi Fantasia Bunko with illustrations by Saboten. Twelve volumes were released from March 20, 2015, to October 19, 2019.

No.	Title	Japanese release date	Japanese ISBN
1	Keita Amano and Youth Continue; Amano Keita to Seishun Kontinyū (雨野景太と青春コンティニュー)	March 20, 2015	978-4-04-070533-0
2	Karen Tendou and Surprise Happy End; Tendō Karen to Fuiuchi Happī Endo (天道花憐と不意打ちハッピーエンド)	July 18, 2015	978-4-04-070534-7
3	Chiaki Hoshinomori and New Game of First Love; Hoshinomori Chiaki to Hatsukoi Nyū Gēmu (星ノ守千秋と初恋ニューゲーム)	November 20, 2015	978-4-04-070753-2
4	Aguri and Unconscious Critical; Aguri to Mujikaku Kuritikaru (亜玖璃と無自覚クリティカル)	March 19, 2016	978-4-04-070754-9
5	Gamers and Annihilated Game Over; Gēmāzu to Zenmetsu Gēmu Ōbā (ゲーマーズと全滅ゲームオーバー)	July 20, 2016	978-4-04-070969-7
6	The Lonely Gamer and Love Confession Chain Combo; Bocchi Gēmā to Kokuhaku Chein Konbo (ぼっちゲーマーと告白チェインコンボ)	November 19, 2016	978-4-04-070970-3
7	Gamers and Kiss of Dead End; Gēmāzu to Kuchizuke Deddo Endo (ゲーマーズと口づけデッドエンド)	March 18, 2017	978-4-04-070971-0
8	Konoha Hoshinomori and Reversal Back Attack; Hoshinomori Konoha to Gyakuten Bakku Atakku (星ノ守心春と逆転バックアタック)	July 20, 2017	978-4-04-072369-3
9	Keita Amano and Youth Skills Reset; Amano Keita to Seishun Sukiru Risetto (雨野景太と青春スキルリセット)	January 20, 2018	978-4-04-072370-9
10	Karen Tendou and Surprise Update; Tendō Karen to Fuiuchi Appudēto (天道花憐と不意打ちアップデート)	May 19, 2018	978-4-04-072371-6
11	Gamers and First Love Multi End; Gēmāzu to Hatsukoi Maruchi Endo (ゲーマーズと初恋マルチエンド)	October 20, 2018	978-4-04-072900-8
12	Gamers and Youth Continue; Gēmāzu to Seishun Kontinyū (ゲーマーズと青春コンティニュー)	October 19, 2019	978-4-04-072901-5

==== Spin-off ====
Three spin-off volumes wrote by Sekina Aoi, titled Gamers! DLC (ゲーマーズ！DLC, Gēmāzu！DLC), were published through Fujimi Shobo's Fujimi Fantasia Bunko from September 20, 2017, to March 19, 2020.

No.	Release date	ISBN
1	September 20, 2017	978-4-04-072372-3
2	February 20, 2019	978-4-04-073025-7
3	March 19, 2020	978-4-04-073142-1

=== Manga ===
A manga adaptation with art by Tsubasa Takahashi was serialized in Kadokawa Shoten's Monthly Shōnen Ace from October 2016 to September 2019. The seventh and final volume was released on October 26, 2019.

No.	Release date	ISBN
1	March 23, 2017	978-4-04-105446-8
2	June 26, 2017	978-4-04-105771-1
3	November 25, 2017	978-4-04-106308-8
4	March 26, 2018	978-4-04-106717-8
5	September 25, 2018	978-4-04-107363-6
6	February 25, 2019	978-4-04-107816-7
7	October 26, 2019	978-4-04-107817-4

=== Anime ===
An anime television series adaptation directed by Manabu Okamoto and produced by Pine Jam was announced. It aired in Japan from July 13 to September 28, 2017. The opening theme is "GAMERS!" by Hisako Kanemoto, Manaka Iwami, and Rumi Ōkubo. The ending themes are "Fight on!" for the rest of the series except for episode nine and ten which is "Koi no Prologue*" (恋のprologue*; "Prologue to Love"), both performed by Luce Twinkle Wink☆. Crunchyroll streamed the series, while Funimation had licensed it in North America and streamed an English dub. After Sony acquired Crunchyroll, the dub was added to the service.

No.	Title (Note: All English episode titles are taken from Crunchyroll.)	Original release date
1	"Keita Amano and Chapters of the Chosen"; Transliteration: "Amano Keita to Michibi Kareshisha-tachi" (Japanese: 雨野景太と導かれし者達)	July 13, 2017
One day, Keita Amano, a high school boy who has no friends and spends time playing video games, is approached by the beautiful Karen Tendō about joining their school's Game Club. Smitten by Karen's offer, Keita is slightly disappointed that he was not the only one Karen asked to join, but ends up having fun playing FPS games with the other players. Ultimately, however, Keita decides against joining the Game Club as he prefers to play games for enjoyment instead of competition. This rejection hits pretty hard with Karen, who sadly runs off.
2	"Tasuku Uehara and New Game +"; Transliteration: "Uehara Tasuku to Tsuyokute Nyū Gēmu" (Japanese: 上原祐と強くてニューゲーム)	July 20, 2017
Tasuku and Keita play various arcade games. Keita leaves when Tasuku's friends appear, feeling he does not interfere with hobbies. Tasuku pursues him, revealing he puts on a front as he was bullied for being a geek in middle school. After the two come to a mutual understanding, Tasuku sees Karen watching Keita, before accompanying Aguri. Having been dating her without a reason, Tasuku believes Aguri falls in love with him when he was a geek, changing his entire perspective for her.
3	"Chiaki Hoshinomori and StreetPass Communication"; Transliteration: "Hoshinomori Chiaki to Surechigai Tsūshin" (Japanese: 星ノ守千秋とすれ違い通信)	July 27, 2017
Wanting Keita to be with Karen, Tasuku encourages him to talk to Chiaki. The two manage to become friends over similar roles in games, but soon get into a fight over trivial matters. As Tasuku tries to mediate between the two, he unknowingly causes Aguri to worry that he is making moves on Chiaki, particularly when he compliments her with short hair. Keita pursues Aguri in hopes of clearing up any confusion, but the relationship get worse when Aguri sees Tasuku and Chiaki outside.
4	"Karen Tendo and Slump Days"; Transliteration: "Tendō Karen to Suranpu Deizu" (Japanese: 天道花憐とスランプ・デイズ)	August 3, 2017
Karen's increasing obsession over Keita starts to have a serious effect on her life and ability. On the weekend, Karen invites Keita to the arcade and challenges him to a battle of coin games. Surprised to find that Keita cares about winning sometimes, Karen finds comfort in his belief that playing to win and having fun need not be separate things. Despite being motivated by Keita, Karen becomes worse at video games.
5	"Aguri and Communication Error"; Transliteration: "Aguri to Tsūshin Erā" (Japanese: 亜玖璃と通信エラー)	August 10, 2017
While Keita is with Aguri, Tasuku discovers that Chiaki is both Mono, Keita's online friend from his social game, and Nobe, the developer behind some of his favorite freeware games, leading to the moment where Aguri makes her misunderstanding. Feeling Keita and Chiaki will make up with each other, Tasuku creates a Gamers' Meet Up Club and invite Karen. Despite a discussion about the games Chiaki is developing, the misunderstandings involving them and Aguri only seem to increase. Tasuku tries to convince Keita that he is making progress with Karen than he thinks he has, but winds up giving Chiaki yet another misunderstanding.
6	"Gamers and Wipeout "Game Over""; Transliteration: "Gēmāzu to Zenmetsu Gēmu Ōbā" (Japanese: ゲーマーズと全滅ゲームオーバー)	August 17, 2017
Keita and Aguri discover Tasuku and Chiaki, missing the first part of their conversation and assuming Tasuku is cheating on her. Aguri and Tasuku encourage Keita and Karen to become friends, with Tasuku setting things up so that many students can bear witness to his request. During class, Tasuku, Aguri, and Chiaki, make assumptions and reactions about Keita and Karen, while Karen assumes that Keita prepares to reject her. However, Keita completes a dating sim the previous day, and inadvertently blurts out a love confession taken from the game, which Karen accepts.
7	"Keita Amano and Karen's Best Entertainment"; Transliteration: "Amano Keita to Tendō Karen no Saikō no Goraku" (Japanese: 雨野景太と天道花憐の最高の娯楽)	August 24, 2017
After the confession with Karen, Keita contemplates if he can cancel it, due to assuming she and Tasuku had a problem. Keita invites Karen on a date at the entertainment center, followed by Chiaki. Though Keita loses the game, he makes things enjoyable and the two had a cheerful discussion.
8	"Erogamer and Watching Mode"; Transliteration: "Erogēmā to Kansen Mōdo" (Japanese: エロゲーマーと観戦モード)	August 31, 2017
8	"Gamers and Half their Life Game"; Transliteration: "Gēmāzu to Hansei Gēmu" (Japanese: ゲーマーズと半生ゲーム)	August 31, 2017
Konoha overhears Keita and Misumi at the game shop, taking comfort in Keita recommending an old game she has a fondness for. Keita, Karen, Chiaki, Tasuku, and Aguri play a Love Love Game of Half-Life board game, becoming more awkward as a result of the oddly specific spaces they land on. Before Tasuku and Aguri clear up some misunderstandings between each other, Chiaki believes Keita was her online friend and the one supporting her freeware games this entire time.
9	"Chiaki Hoshinomori and Account Hack"; Transliteration: "Hoshinomori Chiaki to Akaunto Hakku" (Japanese: 星ノ守千秋とアカウントハック)	September 7, 2017
Feeling conflicted about her recent revelation, Chiaki learns that Keita left the ticket last night. After heading home, Chiaki inadvertently shows Keita her computer and phone linking her to Nobe and Mono. Chiaki claims that Konoha is the one who made these aliases. While feeling something amiss about this reveal, Keita sees Konoha accompanying Chiaki, who receives a strange call from Tasuku that the others interpret as a confession.
10	"Gamers and Next Stage"; Transliteration: "Gēmāzu to Nekusuto Sutēji" (Japanese: ゲーマーズとネクストステージ)	September 14, 2017
As Chiaki becomes nervous, Keita invites Aguri to join their Gamers' Meet Up Club to discuss the matter, but he cannot bring it up, instead he states his determination to buy a new game from his favorite series. That night, Konoha encourages Chiaki to sort out her feelings for Keita. The next day, Aguri gets dragged to an awkward meeting with her friend, Sarina, taking offense when she starts mocking her friends. Meanwhile, Karen asks Chiaki and Tasuku to accompany her as she talks about Keita seemingly liking games more than her, leading to yet another complication when Aguri sees them together. As the others manage to clear up the misunderstanding, they are surprised to find Keita prioritize coming to help Aguri over buying the game.
11	"Gamers and Youth Continue"; Transliteration: "Gēmāzu to Seishun Kontinyū" (Japanese: ゲーマーズと青春コンティニュー)	September 21, 2017
Concerned about the relationship between Keita and Aguri, Tasuku suggests to Karen that they prove their respective relationships by inviting them on a double date to an amusement park. While Keita and Aguri assume Karen and Tasuku are trying to cover up their alleged cheating, Konoha brings Chiaki there to intrude on their date. That night, Konoha sets things up for Chiaki to spend time with Keita. As Chiaki decides to withhold expressing her feelings, the date proves to be a success for other couples.
12	"Gamers and Billing System Talk"; Transliteration: "Gēmāzu to Kakin Tōku" (Japanese: ゲーマーズと課金トーク)	September 28, 2017
Keita and his friends discuss about video games and downloadable content, while spending the night at the inn.

== Reception ==
The light novel ranked seventh in 2017 in Takarajimasha's annual light novel guide book Kono Light Novel ga Sugoi!, in the bunkobon category. It ranked eighth in 2018. The anime ranked fourth in popularity on Crunchyroll in summer 2017, an unheard of ranking for a show that was a short-running Shonen Action series.

== See also ==
- Playful Relationships - Another light novel series with the same creator
- My Crush's Crush - A manga series with the same creator
- Student Council's Discretion - Another light novel series with the same creator

== Works cited ==
- "LN" is shortened form for light novel and refers to a volume in the Gamers! light novels.
- "Ch." is shortened form for chapter and refers to a chapter number of the collected Gamers! manga
- "Ep." is shortened form for episode and refers to an episode number of the Gamers! anime
