= Mata Ashita ne/Code =

"Mata Ashita ne/code"

Single by Sachi Tainaka
- B-side: "TOMORROW"
- Released: October 22, 2008
- Genre: J-pop
- Label: Sistus Records

Sachi Tainaka singles chronology
"Mou Kiss Sarechatta" (2008)	"Mata Ashita ne/code" (2008)

"Mata Ashita ne/code" (また明日ね/code) is the ninth single of J-pop singer, Sachi Tainaka. It was released on October 22, 2008. "Mata Ashita ne" was used as the ending theme for the ANB drama Selection X The Museum and for NTV drama Prin-ce 2 making this her third tie-in with the said series. "code" was used as the theme song for the game Fate/unlimited codes, which is related to the anime series, Fate/stay night where she has many tie-ins. "TOMORROW" is a Mayo Okamoto cover song.

The CD's catalog number is GNCX-0016.

== Track listing ==
1. Mata Ashita ne
  Composition/Lyrics: Sachi Tainaka
  Arrangement: Masato Minakawa
2. code
  Lyrics: Matsumura Ryuuji
  Composition/Arrangement: Yuusuke Itagaki
3. TOMORROW
  Lyrics: Mayo Okamoto, Mana Anju
  Composition: Mayo Okamoto
  Arrangement: Masato Minakawa
4. Mata Ashita ne -instrumental-
5. code -instrumental-
