= Mō Kiss Sarechatta =

"Mou Kiss Sarechatta"

Single by Sachi Tainaka
- B-side: "Nettaiya, Ai ga Areba Daijoubu"
- Released: July 23, 2008
- Genre: J-pop
- Label: Sistus Records

Sachi Tainaka singles chronology
| "Visit of Love" (2008) | "Mou Kiss Sarechatta" (2008) | "Mata Ashita ne/Code" (2008) |

"Mou Kiss Sarechatta" (もう キスされちゃった) is Sachi Tainaka's eighth single. It was released on July 23, 2008. This is the singer's first cover song to date. "Nettaiya" is the only original song in this single. "Ai ga Areba Daijoubu" is also a Kohmi Hirose cover song but it is a ballad version of the original.

The CD's catalog number is GNCX-0014.

== Track listing ==
1. Mou Kiss Sarechatta
  Composition/Lyrics: Hirose Kohmi
  Arrangement: Atsushi Yuasa
2. Nettaiya
  Composition/Lyrics: Sachi Tainaka
  Arrangement: Masao Doi
3. Ai ga Areba Daijoubu
  Composition/Lyrics: Hirose Kohmi
  Arrangement: Atsushi Yuasa
4. Mou Kiss Sarechatta -instrumental-
5. Nettaiya -instrumental-
