= Student Council's Discretion =

Japanese light novel series

- First light novel volume cover, featuring Kurimu Sakurano

生徒会の一存 (Seitokai no Ichizon)
- Genre: Harem, Comedy, slice of life
- Light novel

Hekiyou Gakuen Seitokai Gijiroku
- Written by: Sekina Aoi
- Illustrated by: Kira Inugami
- Published by: Fujimi Shobo
- Imprint: Fujimi Fantasia Bunko
- Original run: January 19, 2008 – January 20, 2012
- Volumes: 10
- Manga
- Written by: Sekina Aoi
- Illustrated by: 10mo
- Published by: Fujimi Shobo
- Magazine: Dragon Age Pure (vol. 12–15); Monthly Dragon Age
- Original run: August 20, 2008 – July 9, 2013
- Volumes: 8
- Light novel

Hekiyou Gakuen Seitokai Mokushiroku
- Written by: Sekina Aoi
- Illustrated by: Kira Inugami
- Published by: Fujimi Shobo
- Imprint: Fujimi Fantasia Bunko
- Original run: September 20, 2008 – July 20, 2018
- Volumes: 9
- Manga

Seitokai no Ichizon Nya✩
- Written by: Sekina Aoi
- Illustrated by: Sorahiko Mizushima
- Published by: Kadokawa Shoten
- Magazine: Comptiq
- Original run: May 9, 2009 – December 10, 2009
- Volumes: 1
- Anime television series
- Directed by: Takuya Satō
- Written by: Jukki Hanada
- Music by: Shuhei Kamimura
- Studio: Studio Deen
- Licensed by: NA: Sentai Filmworks
- Original network: BS11, Chiba TV, Sun TV, Tokyo MX, TV Aichi, tvk, TV Saitama, TVQ
- English network: US: Anime Network
- Original run: October 2, 2009 – December 18, 2009
- Episodes: 12
- Manga

Seitokai no Ichizon Petit
- Written by: Sekina Aoi
- Illustrated by: Rentan Migiri
- Published by: Kadokawa Shoten
- Magazine: Comp Ace; Comptiq
- Original run: October 26, 2009 – 2011
- Volumes: 2
- Manga

Seitokai no Nichijō
- Written by: Sekina Aoi
- Illustrated by: Ashio
- Published by: Fujimi Shobo
- Magazine: Monthly Dragon Age
- Original run: June 9, 2011 – July 9, 2012
- Volumes: 1
- Manga

Seitokai no Ichizon Otsu
- Written by: Sekina Aoi
- Illustrated by: Sorahiko Mizushima
- Published by: Kadokawa Shoten
- Magazine: Comptiq
- Original run: September 10, 2011 – February 10, 2013
- Volumes: 3
- Original net animation

Seitokai no Ichizon Lv.2
- Directed by: Ken'ichi Imaizumi
- Written by: Reiko Yoshida
- Music by: Tomohiro Anzai
- Studio: AIC
- Licensed by: NA: Sentai Filmworks
- Released: October 13, 2012 – December 15, 2012
- Episodes: 10 + OVA
- Light novel

Hekiyou Gakuen Shin Seitokai Gijiroku
- Written by: Sekina Aoi
- Illustrated by: Kira Inugami
- Published by: Fujimi Shobo
- Imprint: Fujimi Fantasia Bunko
- Original run: November 20, 2012 – March 19, 2013
- Volumes: 2
- Manga

Shin Seitokai no Ichizon
- Written by: Sekina Aoi
- Illustrated by: Dicca Suemitsu
- Published by: Fujimi Shobo
- Magazine: Monthly Dragon Age
- Original run: January 9, 2013 – February 8, 2014
- Volumes: 3
- icon

Student Council's Discretion (生徒会の一存, Seitokai no Ichizon) is a collection of Japanese light novels by Sekina Aoi, with illustrations by Kira Inugami. The series started with the release of the first volume on January 19, 2008, published by Fujimi Shobo under their Fujimi Fantasia Bunko label. Originally the series was called Hekiyou Gakuen Seitokai Gijiroku (碧陽学園生徒会議事録; lit. Hekiyou Academy Student Council Minutes), but was later changed to the subtitle of the first volume, "Seitokai no Ichizon" (生徒会の一存).

== Plot ==
The student council members of Hekiyou Academy in Hokkaidō are selected by a popularity contest. As a result, the members are usually a group of pretty girls. The sole male member is Ken Sugisaki, who entered the student council by becoming the top-scoring student in the level which he had to cram to achieve.

The series revolves around the meetings inside the student council room in Private High School Hekiyou Academy (私立高校・碧陽学園, Shiritsu Kōkō Hekiyō Gakuen). The story (as written in the series) has a metafiction component where, under the student council president Sakurano Kurimu orders, vice president Ken Sugisaki has to write stories to show the other students how brilliant the student council is. Ken negotiates with Fujimi Shobo to publish these stories. The author himself likens the series to that of a yonkoma novel which portrays the characters having comical conversations and parodying otaku culture.

== Characters ==
=== Hekiyou Academy student council ===
Ken Sugisaki (杉崎 鍵, Sugisaki Ken)
A 2nd Year student and holds the Student Council "Blue Chip" Seat for Vice-President - Valedictorian. He entered the student council as the top-scoring student in his year; the highest scoring student has a choice to be in the student council. He had to work hard to improve his score, being in the lowest score bracket when he enrolled. He is referred to as "Kī-kun" by Chizuru, from his given name Ken (鍵) which also can be read as Kagi (鍵; key). He loves playing eroge and bishōjo games, and plans on making the rest of the student council members his "harem". On the surface, he seems to be lazy and carefree, but he is actually very hardworking and always stays behind after dismissal to finish all the student council work so that the student council can have fun as always. Ken also has a serious side to him, and he truly cares for those around him; According to Kurimu, they have yet to find someone who dislikes Ken. Ken reveals to Lilicia that the student council itself is his "dream", where his goals and happiness co-exist.

A unique trivia about Ken is that he starts every episode with behavior that exasperates the other members of the student council, but at the end of each episode Ken always shows his serious side, making the other members of the student council grateful to him. Ken was bullied in the past by his classmates during middle school despite his apparent happiness and two-timed two girls, he even asked to be bullied in middle school. In contrast to his active self in the student council, Ken was often isolated socially in middle school. In the last episode, it is revealed that he met all of the girls in the current student council throughout the year before joining, one in each season. Each of the four girls changed his life in some way for the better and help create the perverse and goofy, but kind and hard-working person that he is now. It's because of those encounters that he strove to be in the student council for the sole purpose of repaying them by making all four of the girls happy. Currently, Sugisaki and Kurimu are dating at the present story.

Kurimu Sakurano (桜野 くりむ, Sakurano Kurimu)
Voiced by: Mariko Honda (Japanese); Stephanie Sheh (English)
A senior in Hekiyou Academy and is the president of the student council. She has an extreme sweet tooth, and has a pink/reddish hair. Her nickname is Aka-chan (アカちゃん), which was given to her by Chizuru; She added an extra character to her first name, and changed it to Kurimuzon (クリムゾン; Crimzon) and translated to Japanese becomes Aka (赤; Red). Her nickname can also mean Aka-chan (赤ちゃん; baby). This is often used as a joke against her in the series, poking fun of her childish size and looks, despite being a senior. However, acting childish around Chizuru does not seem to bother her. She is well-liked by most of the other students. Most of the episodes start out with Kurimu making a statement in front of a whiteboard. She is the cause of most of Ken's labor and why he became an eroge maniac.

Kurimu and Ken met in the spring (桜野 = field of cherry blossoms) when she was Vice President at the time, Ken decided to help her carry boxes. He asked for her help in becoming a better person, and Kurimu suggested playing a dating sim game as she said that the main character's job is to make everyone happy. Their meeting gave him a goal in mind and taught him to look towards the future. Like the season she represents, she's often the first to suggest something and is always looking towards the bigger picture in mind. She has a very large ego calling herself the best student council in the world, and that she is destined to be a god. She is very childish, but has an arrogant self-image, thinking she has F-size breasts and is 170 cm tall and her clothes make her look small. She is also not very mature for her age. The anime suggests that she has feelings for Ken. Currently, Sugisaki and Kurimu are dating in the present story.

Chizuru Akaba (紅葉 知弦, Akaba Chizuru)
Voiced by: Yuka Saitō (first season), Mina (second season) (Japanese); Kate Bristol (English)
The Secretary of the Student Council. She has a tall and model-like figure. She is a mature woman who seems to spend most of her time being quite serious. However, she has a sadistic side to her, which is shown when she "brain-washes" Ken and Kurimu. Also, she makes a lot of references to her sadism in the anime. She loves to cuddle and "abuse" the President (Kurimu) in a little sister's way and is an avid reader. Sometimes, it is hinted towards her wanting to be involved with Kurimu. She is hinted towards having a couple of part-time jobs despite being too young legally to even have a job. While she is identified as the cool, serious type, she can embrace her more cutesy side to her once hopping around dressed as a cute sheep.

Chizuru and Ken met in autumn when Ken was suffering from a broken heart. Their meeting healed it and showed her compassion for others. Like the season she represents, she always seems a bit gloomy and hard to approach but has a certain elegance to her. In middle school, she was bullied by her best friend. As her friend was scared of losing Chizuru's friendship, she attempted to isolate Chizuru. The bullying created emotional scars that were later healed by the student council. Chizuru states she is not a morning person, with her hugging Kurimu in the morning. She is very manipulative, able to control Kurimu and Ken. She calls Ken her slave and even sets the ringtone to repeat "my slave" when he calls. In the anime, she is hinted to have feelings for Ken. In the novel, it appears her feelings grow to the point of being nervous around Ken.

Minatsu Shiina (椎名 深夏, Shiina Minatsu)
Voiced by: Misuzu Togashi (Japanese); Iris Menas (English)
A bold character and Student Council Vice-president. A tomboy with impressive athletic skills, and is surprisingly also good in math, which Ken considers to be uncharacteristic of her. She's popular among girls and has a bit of a yuri taste. She's in the same class with Ken but she's an orthodox tsundere without any 'dere' (short for dere-dere (でれでれ)) to be found. She also has a little sister, Mafuyu. She is very protective of Mafuyu and despises anyone who tries to hurt her. She is into a lot of shōnen manga as most of her suggestions tend to be based on typical shōnen manga plots.

Minatsu and Ken met in the summer. Due to how she was, he looked up to her and to be like her, but she told him that he should not aim to be like her but to aim for the impossible. Their meeting taught him not to be lazy and work if he desires something. Like the season she represents, she is fired up and is always ready to take action, especially when it has something to do with anime or manga. Both Minatsu and Mafuyu never got to know their father, and Minatsu was unwilling to meet her mothers' boyfriend saying it had nothing to do with them, creating a rift between Minatsu and her mother, but their mother always took care of them no matter how tired she was. In the anime and novel, her feelings for Ken grow so much that she is aware that she's in love with Ken. She is seen kissing him in volume 8 of the light novel and episode 4 of the second season of the anime.

Mafuyu Shiina (椎名 真冬, Shiina Mafuyu)
Voiced by: Yuki Horinaka (first season), Iori Nomizu (second season) (Japanese); Mackenzie-Eniola Skoliok (English)
The Student Council Treasurer, Minatsu's sister, and the only freshman in the Council. She is a swaying bishōjo and is afraid of males (though she lightens up to Ken). Ken thought her to be "the easiest character to see the ending" but later turns out to be the most feared one by some reason, even when compared to Chizuru, particularly the fact that she's a fujoshi, and that she fantasizes pairing Ken romantically with a boy named Nakameguro she's writing (who turns out to be an actual person). When it comes to boys' love, Mafuyu can actually be just as perverted, if not worse, than Ken. She's addicted to video games and spends much of her free time playing with a handheld game console that resembles a pink PlayStation Portable.

Mafuyu and Ken met in the winter chatting online with him as Yuki (with Ken as Key) and even having a more spirited personality online. Ken fell asleep once in the snow and, despite her fear of men, Mafuyu took him out of the freezing cold. Their meeting showed him a clear understanding of what strength really is. Like the season she represents, she's extremely passive and keeps a lot to herself, but she will show her real self and her real feelings if she feels comfortable. Despite her shy personality (or based on Ken's logic, because she is shy) she confesses her love to Ken, although she says she just wanted to share her feelings with him rather than start a relationship, because she loves the Student Council's atmosphere most of all, implying that even when she loves him she doesn't want to change how things are at the moment.

Satori Magiru (真儀瑠 紗鳥, Magiru Satori)
Voiced by: Mami Kosuge
A teacher of Japanese and an advisor of the Student Council. She is also one of the primary characters of the author's previous work "Material Ghost".

Tsukushi Saionji (西園寺 つくし, Saionji Tsukushi)
A transfer student who was elected to the new President of the Student Council.

Runa Minase (水無瀬 流南, Minase Runa)
Voiced by: Houko Kuwashima
New Vice-president of the Student Council.

Hokuto Kagami (火神 北斗, Kagami Hokuto)
New Treasurer of the Student Council. Though her number of votes in the popularity poll was sixth place, she was awarded the election since Ringo Sugisaki and Rie Shiraki, the fourth place and the fifth place, declined.

Touko Hinomori (日守 東子, Hinomori Tōko)
New Secretary of the Student Council. Since she always wears a mask, there are few students who have ever seen her face before. But the students who noticed that she was extremely cute unanimously voted for her.

=== Students ===
Lilicia Toudou (藤堂 リリシア, Tōdō Ririshia)
Voiced by: Mamiko Noto
The President of the Journalism Club, and ranked fifth in the school's popularity poll; just falling short of getting into the Student Council. Lilicia and Kurimu are constantly at loggerheads. Lilicia also seems to be extremely afraid of Chizuru. She claims that she despises the current Student Council because they always laze around, doing nothing. She constantly targets Ken for her attacks toward the Student Council for being a two-timing individual, though her sister Elise states that it is because she likes him. Despite her repeated attempts to slander the Student Council, she has mutual respect for them.

Meguru Uchuu (宇宙 巡, Uchū Meguru)
Voiced by: Ryōko Shintani
Ken and Minatsu's classmate. She is cute but failed to garner votes in the popularity poll due to defects in her character. Subsequently, she became an idol to show them what she could do. She made a film with Ken starring in it, to which the audio from the film was misunderstood by the girls of the student council about Ken's identity.

Mamoru Uchuu (宇宙 守, Uchū Mamoru)
Voiced by: Yūdai Satō
Meguru's younger brother. He has a crush on Minatsu but she does not notice his feelings.
Meguru and Mamoru are called "Space Siblings (スペース姉弟, Supēsu Kyōdai)" by classmates from their surname.

Yoshiki Nakameguro (中目黒 善樹, Nakameguro Yoshiki)
Voiced by: Kazutomi Yamamoto (Japanese); Jonah Scott (English)
The classmate of Ken and Minatsu. He transferred to Hekiyou Academy since he was bullied by his classmates at the previous school. He likes Ken better than pushy Space Siblings but Ken does not want to become too close to him because he has the same surname as the character of Mafuyu's BL novels by coincidence as well as looking identical to her pictures of her character.

Meiku Kazami (風見 めいく, Kazami Meiku)
A new President of the Journalism Club.

=== Other characters ===
Elise Toudou (藤堂 エリス, Tōdō Erisu)
Voiced by: Ai Shimizu
Lilicia's younger sister. She spent time with Ken at school as part of her sister's plan to dig up information on the student council. Afterward, she states that Ken already knew why she was there and played with her anyway. Because of that, she has taken a liking to Ken, and she addresses him as "nii-sama". She is also quite mature for her age (especially when it comes to "adult" matters) and pretty smart, even managing to get a tough math problem right before Kurimu did.

Echo of Death (残響死滅 (エコー・オブ・デス), Ekō obu Desu)
Voiced by: Takahiro Sakurai
A made-up Ken's older brother from Minatsu's Fantasy and Mafuyu also uses the character in her fantasy.

Ringo Sugisaki (杉崎 林檎, Sugisaki Ringo)
Voiced by: Madoka Yonezawa
Ken's step-sister. Very innocent and loves her brother very much to the point of wanting to marry him.

Asuka Matsubara (松原 飛鳥, Matsubara Asuka)
Voiced by: Ami Koshimizu
Ken's childhood friend and former girlfriend. She is also close to Ringo.

== Media ==
=== Light novel ===
The light novel's run lasted for 4 years, from 2008 to 2012 with ten volumes published. Its spinoff, Hekiyou Gakuen Seitokai Mokushiroku, ran throughout the original series's run and ended long past it; it started publication in 2008 and ending in 2018 with nine volumes. The sequel, Haikyuu Gakuen Shin Seitokai Gijiroku was the shortest of the installment, lasting from late 2012 to early 2013 with two volumes.

=== Manga ===
A manga adaptation by 10mo started serialization in Fujimi Shobo's shōnen manga magazine Dragon Age Pure on August 20, 2008. Another manga adaptation by Sorahiko Mizushima started serialization in Kadokawa Shoten's Comptiq magazine on May 9, 2009. On December 24, 2014, KADOKAWA released the English digital volumes of the manga series on BookWalker, their official eBook store.

=== Anime ===
A 12-episode anime series adaptation produced by Studio Deen, written by Jukki Hanada, and directed by Takuya Satō aired in Japan between October 2 and December 18, 2009. A second season titled Seitokai no Ichizon Lv.2 aired in Japan on the Nico Live section of Nico Nico Douga between October 13 and December 15, 2012. Lv.2 was produced by AIC, written by Reiko Yoshida, and directed by Ken'ichi Imaizumi.

==== Seitokai no Ichizon (2009) ====
No. in season	Title	Original release date
1	"Student Council Chats" "Daberu Seitokai" (駄弁る生徒会)	October 2, 2009
Hekiyou Academy Student Council. Only those who are chosen may enter this sacred paradise. Ken Sugisaki is the only person chosen as a member for his academic excellence; miraculously recovering from having the lowest academic score in the academy. It's just any other day as he attempts to create a harem for himself with the council members, who ignore his attempts.
2	"Student Council Studies" "Benkyō suru Seitokai" (勉強する生徒会)	October 9, 2009
There is a shadow lurking among the Hekiyou Academy students, a monster called midterm exams. Will the student council member manage to improve Student Council president Kurimu Sakurano's grades into somewhat a norm? Or is this study group doomed before it even begins?
3	"Student Council Interviewed" "Shuzai sareru Seitokai" (取材される生徒会)	October 16, 2009
Lilicia Toudou, president of the newspaper club constantly antagonizes the student council by looking for scandals. She attempts to bring the student council down for good as she interviews each of its members. Though there seems to be a small group of students who questions the point of her actions when the student council is already known for its questionable conduct. Cameo of Enma Ai from Hell Girl.
4	"Student Council Creates" "Sōsaku suru Seitokai" (創作する生徒会)	October 27, 2009
To improve the student council's public image into something more positive, Kurimu decides to create a novel about the student council. With each member requesting storylines that are pure chaos, the writer Ken loses it, writing a story solely based on his fantasy.
5	"Student Council Rests" "Kyūkei suru Seitokai" (休憩する生徒会)	October 30, 2009
Summer, summer uniforms, and swimsuits; those are enough to cause Ken Sugisaki to go out of control and be immediately locked into a locker. But that wasn't enough to stop him from using his imagination solely based on the chatter he hears in the room. To make matters worse the air conditioner in the student council room is out of service, and slowly everyone in the room is taking off their clothes.
6	"Student Council Reaches Out" "Sashinoberu Seitokai" (差し伸べる生徒会)	November 6, 2009
The student council is in the midst of deciding the theme for the school festival held during the fall season when Mafuyu and Minatsu announce they will be transferring schools. Minatsu suggests fighting, Mafuyu "competition", Chizuru pushes for "pain" and Ken pushes for "licentious". To try to stop the sisters from transferring they suggest going with the fight theme.
7	"Student Council Steps Out" "Fumidasu Seitokai" (踏み出す生徒会)	November 13, 2009
The Student Council decides to go on a summer trip to Tokyo but because the president is convinced that airplanes can't fly (she refers to them as lumps of metal) they end up taking a sleeper train. Once in Tokyo they spend the night telling ghost stories and watching the sunrise.
8	"Student Council Envies" "Shitto suru Seitokai" (嫉妬する生徒会)	November 20, 2009
Ken causes a commotion when he shows up at the student council office with a mysterious girl. He explains that he is looking after Elise, Lilicia's younger sister until she comes to pick her up. They end up playing with string figures, Shiritori, and more children's games, but for some reason, Elise can turn these games into something much deeper.
9	"My Student Council" "Watashi no Seitokai" (私の生徒会)	November 27, 2009
A flashback shows Chizuru comforting Ken, who appears to be heartbroken. The Student Council begins their new topic, "Reading Books", as Ken asks what books the rest of the Student Council are reading. Chizuru jokes about the book she reads, and when Ken falls in despair, she ends up stating that the real book she wanted to read was the love fortune book. After Chizuru does handshake fortune-telling with Ken, Kurimu interrupts the fortune saying she wants the book. Chizuru informs everyone the first person to react is jealous, and while leaving she thanks Ken and leaves a letter for the Council to read. The letter contains a clue to Chizuru's past.
10	"Tidying Student Council" "Katazukeru Seitokai" (片付ける生徒会)	December 4, 2009
It is the day of the Hekiyou Festival, and the Student Council discusses how to make a "Tear Jerking Story" but in the end, they find it too difficult. Just as the festival ends they try to sort out the "lost and found" items to verify what belongs to who. At the end, after Kurimu gives her grand speech, Ken was just about to be left alone to work on cleaning up the lost and found items, but everyone agrees to stay and help finish up the remaining work.
11	"The Fragmented Student Council" "Kakeru Seitokai" (欠ける生徒会)	December 11, 2009
In the beginning Ken talks to "Yuki" about what he can do to change but gets teased rather than getting a serious answer. A flashback shows how Ken and Mafuyu "met". Ken is missing due to illness, so the girls end up talking about part-time jobs while also finishing up the paperwork. In the end, Mafuyu suggests going visit Ken which they decided to go. The Student Council run into Ken's former junior high classmates, and his classmates tell the council about how he two-timed girls and was the outcast in junior high. Kurimu fights back telling them he said the aforementioned girls are now happy, but they continue to insult him, causing Mafuyu to hit one of them with her bag. The Student Council taught them a lesson as Lilicia makes an appearance stating "the journalism club is meant to make false stories of the Student council." Ken is then nursed by everyone. Mafuyu finally confesses to Ken.
12	"The Student Council's Discretion" "Seitokai no Ichizon" (生徒会の一存)	December 18, 2009
After Mafuyu confesses to Ken, the council ends up talking about each of their plans for the future. A new transfer student shows up for help, and it turns out its none other than Nakameguro, who was guided to the council in asking Ken to help find his way home. Nakameguro and Ken end up talking about their pasts on their way home, and Nakameguro goes on to say that Ken is amazing and he's strong but Ken disagrees, saying he is weak without the help of the student council. Ken goes on to explain how he was influenced by each of the student council members during his first year as the seasons went by.

==== Seitokai no Ichizon Lv.2 (2012) ====
No. in season	Title	Original release date
0	"Sugisaki's Memories" "sugisaki MEMORIARU" (すぎさきメモリアル)	October 13, 2012
Setting takes place before the events of the first season, in Ken's first year at Heikyou Academy. Ken decides to go buy a dating sim game, but the shop assistant, Runa Minase, offers him poor recommendations when he asks for help, going as far as to spoil the games for him. And although he decides to devote his time to making others happy as shown from the results of the harem ending he has always envisioned, he sets his goals on joining the Student Council. Although the ever blunt Runa discourages him from trying to go for the blue-chip seat, seeing that he will never catch up to her (the valedictorian), he continues to study hard while balancing work and social life. Eventually, he ends up tied for first in the rankings with Runa and gets the blue-chip seat when Runa states she doesn't want it.
1	"The student council brainstorms" "TEKO iresuru seitokai" (テコいれする生徒会)	October 20, 2012
The Student Council members brainstorm ideas on how to change up the show's settings (breaking the fourth wall). They discuss a variety of ideas, such as giving more speaking parts to the girls, changing the plot, and ways to attract new viewers. In the end, they decide to keep the status quo of how the student council functions.
2	"The student council gets suspicious" "utagau seitokai" (疑う生徒会)	October 27, 2012
Kurimu's cake has gone missing! As a furious Kurimu demands to know where the cake went, Ken plays the role of detective as he tries to figure out where her cake has gone. As each member pleads their innocence, the case becomes more confusing when the advisor Magiru knows who the culprit is but collapses before she can reveal the clue, and Ken gets knocked out and loses his memories. Can the council figure out who the real culprit is?
3	"The student council gets a job" "shuushoku suru seitokai" (就職する生徒会)	November 3, 2012
The Student Council discusses what jobs they want to have in the future, and even role-play what they expect it to be like, although it's not as exactly as Ken hoped for.
4	"The student council collects" "kaishuu suru seitokai" (回収する生徒会)	November 10, 2012
Kurimu proposes that they survey the school and get some feedback on what the Student Council could do to help reform the school. While going to collect the survey, Ken gets jealous when Minatsu begins talking to another boy in the hallway, and Minatsu also gets jealous when Ken talks to a group of girls in a classroom. Ken and Minatsu try to figure out if they have any feelings for each other.
5	"Holy war" "seisen" (聖戦)	November 17, 2012
Chizuru, Minatsu, and Mafuyu are out doing other things, so it's just Kurimu and Ken in the council room, who try to figure out what to talk about. They end up playing catch while answering questions and answers with each other, and the others eventually come back. Later that night, Ken can't find the serial number of his dating sim game in his apartment. He ends up calling his stepsister Ringo Sugisaki at their house for the number, but she seems to toy with him, causing him to get desperate for hilarious results. He ends up getting the number, but it turns out he bought the wrong version of the game.
6	"The student council welcomes" "kangei suru seitokai" (歓迎する生徒会)	November 24, 2012
Ken brings Ringo to visit the Student Council, and the other members are immediately won over by her shy and cute demeanor. However, Ringo is extremely pure and creates a lot of misunderstandings due to her bizarre statements.
7	"S-Size hunter" "S SAIZUHANTAA" (Sサイズハンター)	December 1, 2012
Ken is assigned to follow Lilicia around as the focus of a spinoff anime for supporting characters. Ken ends up trying to make Lilicia more popular while they stalk Mafuyu and Kurimu through a department store at the same time.
8	"The student council chases" "oi kakeru seitokai" (追いかける生徒会)	December 8, 2012
After Ken and his ex-girlfriend Asuka Matsubara go to an onsen under the guise of being a fake married couple, a curious Student Council decides to go to the onsen also. Ken suspects that Asuka brought him there for another reason, but it's not until they get into the baths until he finds out that she wants him to stop pursuing his goal of a harem, and instead focus his attention on her. He refuses and tells her that he wants to continue his goal of making everyone happy, even though he realizes now that some people will be hurt along the way. The rest of the council members get distracted along the way in their search for Ken, but the two groups end up running into each other. Although Asuka appears to insult each of the members, they end up brushing it off like it was nothing and talk about Ken.
9	"The student council doesn't end" "owaranai seitokai" (終わらない生徒会)	December 15, 2012
It's the last meeting of the year for the Student Council since Chizuru and Kurimu are graduating the next day and Mafuyu and Minatsu will be transferring schools to the mainland. The council debates on something to pass down to future student councils. Chizuru suggests they leave the light novels (written about them) for the next council, and everyone agrees. They also clean up and shop for supplies for improving the appearance of the council room. They run into different people they've encountered in the student council this past year, and plan the valedictorian and farewell speech, to be made by Kurimu and Ken respectively. As the meeting finishes, Ken suddenly bursts out that he has been wanting to say something to the council the whole time. He ends up speaking to each of the members individually from his heart and thanking each of them for making the Student Council so worth it. They all respond that they will always accept Ken and encourage him to make his dreams come true.

==== Seitokai no Shukujitsu (OVA 2013) ====
No. in season	Title	Original release date
1	"The Giving Student Council" "Watasu seito-kai" (渡す生徒会)	July 5, 2013
An OVA bundled with the eighth volume of the Seitokai Series Spinoff novel. Takes place during Valentine's Day of the second season. Each of the girls struggles to figure out how to approach and give chocolate to Ken.

=== Music ===
Opening themes
1. "Treasure" - Hekiyou Gakuen Seitokai (碧陽学園生徒会).
2. "Precious"
Ending themes
1. "Mousou Fetish" (妄想☆ふぇてぃっしゅ!; "Fantasy Fetish") - Hekiyou Gakuen Seitokai (碧陽学園生徒会) (ep 1)
2. "Ue Ue Shita Shita Hidari Migi Hidari Migi BA" (上上下下左右左右BA; "Up Up Down Down Left Right Left Right B A") - Hekiyou Gakuen Seitokai (碧陽学園生徒会) (ep 2)
3. "Mousou Fetish ~Shiina Shimai ver.~" (妄想☆ふぇてぃっしゅ! 〜椎名姉妹ver.〜; "Fantasy Fetish ~Shiina Sisters ver.~") - Hekiyou Gakuen Seitokai (碧陽学園生徒会), vice president & treasurer (ep 3)
4. "Mousou Fetish ~2 ban~" (妄想☆ふぇてぃっしゅ! 〜2ばん〜; "Fantasy Fetish ~2nd~") - Hekiyou Gakuen Seitokai (碧陽学園生徒会)(ep 4)
5. "Ue Ue Shita Shita Hidari Migi Hidari Migi BA ~Ganbare Kurimu ver.~" (上上下下左右左右BA 〜がんばれくりむver.〜; "Up Up Down Down Left Right Left Right B A ~Don't Give Up Kurimu ver.~") - Hekiyou Gakuen Seitokai (碧陽学園生徒会), president & secretary (ep 5)
6. "Ue Ue Shita Shita Hidari Migi Hidari Migi BA ~2 ban~" (上上下下左右左右BA 〜2ばん〜; "Up Up Down Down Left Right Left Right B A ~2nd~") - Hekiyou Gakuen Seitokai (碧陽学園生徒会) (ep 6)
7. "Mousou Fetish ~Sasuga Chizuru ver.~" (妄想☆ふぇてぃっしゅ! 〜さすが!!知弦ver.〜; "Fantasy Fetish ~Expected Chizuru ver.~") - Hekiyou Gakuen Seitokai (碧陽学園生徒会) (ep 7)
8. "Ue Ue Shita Shita Hidari Migi Hidari Migi BA ~Shiina Shimai ver.~" (上上下下左右左右BA 〜椎名姉妹ver.〜; "Up Up Down Down Left Right Left Right B A ~Shiina Sisters ver.~") - Hekiyou Gakuen Seitokai (碧陽学園生徒会), vice president & treasurer (ep 8)
9. "Yurupa Wonderful" (ゆるぱ☆わンダフル; "Wonderful Yurupa") - Hekiyou Gakuen Seitokai (碧陽学園生徒会) (ep 9)
10. "Yurupa Wonderful ~Kurimu&Chitsuru ver.~" (ゆるぱ☆わンダフル 〜くりむ&知弦ver.〜; "Wonderful Yurupa ~Kurimu&Chizuru ver.~") - Hekiyou Gakuen Seitokai (碧陽学園生徒会), president & secretary (ep 10)
11. "Zettai Kaichou Sengen?" (ぜったいかいちょーせんげん?; "Absolute President Declaration?") - Sakurano Kurimu (桜野くりむ) (ep 11)
12. "Yurupa Wonderful ~2ban~" (ゆるぱ☆わンダフル 〜2ばん〜; "Wonderful Yurupa ~2nd~") - Hekiyou Gakuen Seitokai (碧陽学園生徒会) (ep 12

== Reception ==
By July 2023, the light novel had over 6 million copies in circulation.

== See also ==
- Gamers!, another light novel series with the same creator
- My Crush's Crush, a manga series with the same creator
- Playful Relationships, another light novel series with the same creator
