= Saikō no Kataomoi =

Single by Sachi Tainaka

from the album Dear…
- B-side: "It's my life"
- Released: August 30, 2006
- Genre: J-pop
- Label: Sistus Records
- Songwriter(s): Sachi Tainaka

Sachi Tainaka singles chronology
"Kirameku Namida wa Hoshi ni" (2006)	"Saikō no Kataomoi" (2006)	"Aitai yo. / Kimi to no Ashita" (2007)

"Saikō no Kataomoi" (最高の片想い, The Greatest Unrequited feelings) is Sachi Tainaka's third single and was released on August 30, 2006. The title track was used as the ending theme for the Japanese animation Saiunkoku Monogatari.

The single reached #50 in Japan. The CD's catalog number is GNCX-0005.

== Track listing ==
1. 最高の片想い

- Lyrics: Sachi Tainaka
- Music: Sachi Tainaka

2. It's my life

- Lyrics: Sachi Tainaka
- Music: Sachi Tainaka

3. 最高の片想い -instrumental-

4. It's my life -instrumental-
