= Visit of Love =

"Visit of love"

Single by Sachi Tainaka
- B-side: "With～Harunatsu Akifuyu"
- Released: January 23, 2008
- Genre: J-pop
- Label: Sistus Records

Sachi Tainaka singles chronology
"Lipstick/Ichiban Boshi" (2007)	"Visit of love" (2008)	"Mou Kiss Sarechatta" (2008)

"Visit of love" is Sachi Tainaka's seventh single and was released on January 23, 2008. "Visit of love" was used as the ending theme for the second season of Prin-ce, an entertainment program in Japan. The B-side With～Harunatsu Akifuyu (With～春夏秋冬, With～Spring, Summer, Autumn, Winter) will be used as an insert song for the film Persona.

The CD's catalog number is GNCX-0013.

== Track listing ==
1. "Visit of Love"
2. "With～Harunatsu Akifuyu"
3. "Visit of Love" -instrumental-
4. "With～Harunatsu Akifuyu" -instrumental-
