= Love Is (EP) =

EP by MiChi
- Released: 22 December 2010
- Recorded: 2010
- Genres: J-Pop, dance-pop
- Label: Sony Music Entertainment
- Producer: Tomokazu Matsuzawa

MiChi chronology
Up to You (2009)	Love Is (2010)	Therapy (2012)

Singles from Love Is
- 1. "Love Is" Released: 22 December 2010

Love Is is the first EP released by British-Japanese musician MiChi, released on 22 December 2010. It is her first non-single release since her debut album Up to You was released in 2009. All four of the songs featured on the EP are used in various commercials and advertisements. The title song was sent to Japanese radio stations as the first single on 19 November, with the music video premiering in early December. It also contains a cover of The Offspring's "Pretty Fly (For A White Guy)", MiChi's first cover song since 2009's "Kiss Kiss xxx". This makes it her seventh cover song, following her cover versions of songs by The Spice Girls, Nirvana, Avril Lavigne, Queen, Des'ree and Fergie.

== Music video ==
The music video for the song was filmed using stop motion techniques, and was filmed backwards. The video features MiChi doing everyday things such as sleeping and sitting on a couch while crew members build the rest of the set behind her. It starts with the words 'MiChi' and 'LOVE is.' being spelled out on a fireplace and MiChi entering her apartment through a door. It then depicts her moving around the apartment while random people come and add furniture and decorations. the video ends with MiChi sitting on a wooden chair in a room full of candles, balloons and large glass bottles.

== Reception ==
Japan-focused blog Tokyohive gave the album a positive review, stating "If you like dance pop music, then you’ll like this". They went on the describe each song in detail, "The title track, "Love Is" (typeset as "LOVE is"), reminds of an early nineties song that belongs in Flashdance. The second track, "Yeah Yeah Yeah!!!" (typeset as "YEAH YEAH YEAH!!!"), is your typical pop song with a catchy melody and something you'd sing in karaoke. "Jump on It" (typeset as "JUMP ON IT") is an electro dance track that you'd find in a club somewhere in London. If you're curious to her cover of The Offspring's song, it's not that bad. She does keep the rock aspect of the song, so just imagine that song performed by a female with a British accent."

== Track listing ==
No.	Title	Length
1.	"Love Is"	4:55
2.	"Yeah Yeah Yeah!!!"	5:30
3.	"Jump on It"	4:17
4.	"Pretty Fly (For a White Guy)" (The Offspring cover)	3:17
Total length:		17:59

== Charts ==
Chart	Peak position	Chart run
Oricon Weekly Chart	49	3 weeks
