= Itoshii Hito e =

Single by Sachi Tainaka
- B-side: "Begin"
- Released: June 6, 2007
- Genre: J-pop
- Label: Sistus Records

Sachi Tainaka singles chronology
"Aitai yo. / Kimi to no Ashita" (2007)	"Itoshii Hito e" (2007)	"Lipstick/Ichiban Boshi" (2007)

"Itoshii Hito e" (愛しい人へ) is Sachi Tainaka's fifth single and was released on June 6, 2007. The title track was used as the ending theme for the Japanese animation Moribito: Guardian of the Spirit.

The single reached #67 in Japan. The CD's catalog number is GNCX-0009.

== Track listing ==
1. "Itoshii Hito e"
  - Sachi Tainaka – Songwriter, lyricist
  - Jun Abe (Musician) – Arranger
2. "Begin"
  - Sachi Tainaka – Songwriter, lyricist
  - Kōhei Koyama – Arranger
3. "Itoshii Hito e" (Instrumental)
4. "Begin" (Instrumental)
