= Lipstick/Ichiban Boshi =

"Lipstick/Ichibanboshi"

Single by Sachi Tainaka
- Released: November 7, 2007
- Genre: Pop
- Label: Sistus Records

Sachi Tainaka singles chronology
"Itoshii Hito e" (2007)	"Lipstick/Ichibanboshi" (2007)	"Visit of love" (2008)

"Lipstick/Ichibanboshi" (Lipstick/一番星) is Sachi Tainaka's sixth single and is scheduled for a November 7, 2007 release. Ichibanboshi will be used as the theme song for the film entitled Persona.

The single reached #63 in Japan. The CD's catalog number is GNCX-0011.

== Track listing ==
1. Lipstick
2. Ichibanboshi
3. Lipstick -instrumental-
4. Ichibanboshi -instrumental-
