= Anata ga Ita Mori =

Single by Jyukai

from the album Wild flower
- B-side: "SAKURA difference"
- Released: March 15, 2006
- Genre: J-Pop
- Length: 17:30
- Label: Sistus Records

Jyukai singles chronology
"Anata ga Ita Mori" (2006)	"'Koibito Doushi'" (2006)

Anata ga Ita Mori (あなたがいた森, The forest where you were) is Jyukai's debut single.

== Release ==
It was released on March 15, 2006 under Sistus Records.

== Anime tie-in ==
The title track was used as an ending theme for the anime series Fate/stay night.

== Performance ==
Since the single peaked at #16, and sold 19,172 copies, this is considered Jyukai's most successful single to date.

== Track listing ==
1. Anata ga Ita Mori
2. SAKURA difference
3. Anata ga Ita Mori (instrumental)
4. SAKURA difference (instrumental)
