= MiChi =

Japanese British pop singer

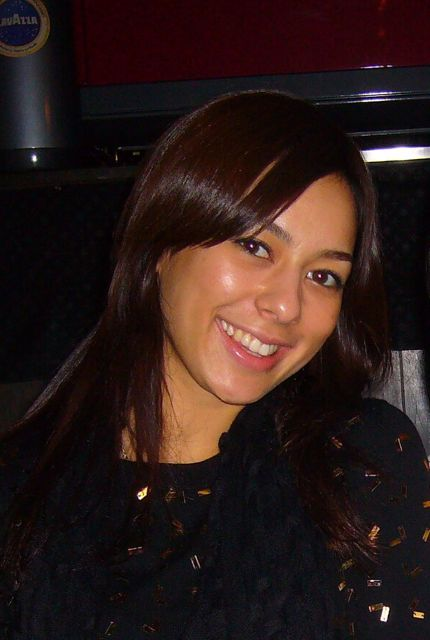
- MiChi

Background information
- Born: Michiko Myfanwy Sellars; 7 April 1985 (age 41); Bromsgrove, Worcestershire, England
- Origin: Bromsgrove, Worcestershire, England
- Genre: Pop
- Years active: 2003–present
- Label: Sony Music Entertainment
- Website: www.michimadness.com

Michiko Myfanwy Sellars (born 7 April 1985), known by her stage name MiChi, is a Japanese British pop singer who began her career as an independent artist, but later signed to Sony Music Entertainment.

== Biography ==
=== Early life and early career ===
Michiko was born in Bromsgrove, England to a Japanese mother and an English father. She moved to Kobe, Japan at the age of two in 1987, but returned to England in 1995 after the Great Hanshin earthquake. Determined to be a singer, she performed in an acoustic duo before returning to Japan when she was 18. The following year, she met Tomokazu Matsuzawa, producer for acts such as Mika Nakashima, Miliyah Kato, Soulhead, and Chemistry. The pair worked together for three years developing her talent before MiChi entered Japan's dance club scene. In March 2007, she released the track "Surrender" on a dance compilation titled Freedom House Mode Collection. It was followed a year later with her independently released English language album Michi Madness, which entered the Japanese Oricon weekly albums chart, but only peaked at number 148.

=== Up To You ===
Later in 2008 she officially debut under Sony Music Entertainment and produced her first single titled "Promise," peaking at number 12 on the Oricon weekly charts. Her second single, titled "Change the World," was released on 18 February 2009 and was used in the drama Kiina: Fukanō Hanzaisōsa-kan.

On 30 September 2009, MiChi released her debut major album Up to You, which was successful and peaked at number 4 on the Oricon weekly album chart. Her song "Something Missing" was used as the theme song in the Sega video game Bayonetta, as well as for commercials promoting the game.

=== Second major album: Therapy ===
In April 2010, she released the single "All About the Girls (Ii jan ka Party People)/Together Again". "Together Again" was used as the theme song for the movie Bushido Sixteen directed by Tomoyuki Furumaya. The music video for "All About The Girls", which features a mix of stop motion, studio and computer generated footage was produced in collaboration with Tokyo dance-troupe Handsome Boyz. In July 2010, she released "Wonder Woman," featuring the Japanese indie band The Telephones. MiChi's final 2010 release was her first Japanese language EP, Love Is. Released due to the delay of her second studio album, the album features four previously unreleased recordings, including three original songs, and a cover of The Offspring's "Pretty Fly (For a White Guy)." The title track from the EP received a stop motion music video, filmed from back to front.

In response to the 2011 Tōhoku earthquake and tsunami, MiChi released online the demo of "One," a song she had been working on. The song, featuring emotional and supportive lyrics, received heavy radio rotation in the days and weeks following the disaster. This led to her label allowing MiChi to finish the song, and release it as an official single. It eventually peaked at 85 on the Oricon charts. Later in 2011, MiChi released her eighth single, "Find Your Way." It charted at number 93, selling just 674 copies, despite a high-profile promotional appearance at the MTV VMAJ awards. On 1 February 2012, MiChi released her ninth single, "Tokyo Nights" featuring Swedish-Japanese indie musician, Leo Imai. The music video, which shows MiChi in various locations throughout Tokyo, including at the Tokyo Tower, was released shortly before the single hit shelves. On 11 February, MiChi finally released details of her second major label album, titled Therapy. Alongside the album title, MiChi also revealed that the album would be released in three different versions, CD, 2CD, and CD/DVD, with the DVD featuring six of MiChi's music videos, and the second CD version having an extra seven-track "Remix collection" with remixes from the likes of Busy P and DSL from the French label, Ed Banger Records.

== Discography ==
- Michi Madness (2008)
- Up to You (2009)
- Therapy (2012)
- Eyes Wide Open (2013)
