= Kirameku Namida wa Hoshi ni =

Single by Sachi Tainaka

from the album Dear…
- B-side: Shōnen no Yume (少年の夢)
- Released: May 31, 2006
- Genre: J-pop
- Label: Sistus Records (Geneon)
- Songwriters: Keita Haga (lyrics); KATE (composition)

Sachi Tainaka singles chronology
"disillusion" (2006)	"Kirameku Namida wa Hoshi ni" (2006)	"Saikō no Kataomoi" (2006)

"Kirameku Namida wa Hoshi ni" (きらめく涙は星に)(Sparkling tears to the stars) is Sachi Tainaka's second single and was released on May 31, 2006. The title track was used as the second opening theme for the anime television show Fate/stay night, and appears in episodes 15 to 23.

The single reached number nine in Japan. The CD's catalog number is GNCX-0003.

== Track listing ==
1. Kirameku Namida wa Hoshi ni (きらめく涙は星に)(Sparkling tears to the stars)
2. Shounen no Yume (少年の夢)(A Boy’s Dream)
3. Kirameku Namida wa Hoshi ni -instrumental- (きらめく涙は星に)
4. Shounen no Yume -instrumental- (少年の夢)
