= Takuya Satō (director) =

Japanese anime screenwriter and director

- 佐藤 卓哉
- Occupations: Screenwriter, director

Takuya Satō (佐藤 卓哉, Satō Takuya) is a Japanese anime screenwriter and director.

== Works ==
- Street Fighter II V (1995) Storyboard (ep 11), Animation Director (ep 1), Assistant Director
- Trigun (1998) Storyboard (ep 25)
- Serial Experiments Lain (1998) Storyboard (ep 10)
- NieA 7 (2000) Director, Series Composition, Storyboard, Animation (OP/ED)
- Princess Tutu (2002–2003) Script (6, 11)
- The Twelve Kingdoms (2002–2003) Storyboard (episodes 3, 8, 19, 32)
- Midori Days (2004) Scenario, Screenplay (eps 2, 6, 9)
- Strawberry Marshmallow (2005) Director, Series Composition, Script (eps 1–2), Storyboard (eps 1, 12)
- Fate/stay night (2006) Series Composition
- Code-E (2007) Series Composition
- Student Council's Discretion (2009) Director
- Fate/stay night: Unlimited Blade Works (2010) Screenplay
- Steins;Gate (2011) Director
- Say "I love you" (2012) Director, Series Composition
- Steins;Gate: The Movie − Load Region of Déjà Vu (2013) Chief director
- selector infected WIXOSS (2014) Director
- selector spread WIXOSS (2014) Director
- Girls Beyond the Wasteland (2016) Director
- selector destructed WIXOSS (2016) Director
- The Great Passage (2016) Series Composition
- Your Light ~Kase-san and Morning Glories~ (ONA) (2017) Director
- Kase-san and Morning Glories (2018) Director
- RErideD: Derrida, who leaps through time (2018) Director
- Fragtime (2019) Director, Script
- Happy-Go-Lucky Days (2020) Director
- Otherside Picnic (2021) Director, Series Composition
- Harmony of Mille-Feuille (2025), Chief Director
- Sekiro: No Defeat (2026), Series Composition
