= Up to You (album) =

Studio album by MiChi
- Released: 30 September 2009
- Recorded: 2009
- Genre: Pop rock
- Label: Sony Music Entertainment

MiChi chronology
Michi Madness (2008)	Up to You (2009)	Love Is (2010)

Up to You is the debut studio album released by Japanese pop singer Michi under Sony Music Entertainment. It was released on 30 September 2009 and peaked at number 4 on the Oricon weekly album chart. It includes the song "Something Missing", which was used in promotion for the PlayStation 3/Xbox 360 game Bayonetta.

== Track listings ==
No.	Title	Length
1.	"MadNesS vol. 1"	1:46
2.	"PROMiSE"	5:01
3.	"ChaNge the WoRLd"	4:44
4.	"Why oh Why"	5:07
5.	"HEy GirL"	3:29
6.	"KiSS KiSS xxx"	4:15
7.	"RaiN"	3:17
8.	"Oh Oh..."	4:06
9.	"Something Missing"	3:50
10.	"One of a Kind"	3:49
11.	"WoNDeRLaND?"	4:08
12.	"Shibuya de Punch"	5:17
13.	"YOU"	4:42
14.	"UP TO YOU"	4:22
Total length:		57:48

DVD (Music Videos)
No.	Title	Length
1.	"PROMiSE"
2.	"HEy GirL"
3.	"ChaNge the WoRLd"
4.	"KiSS KiSS xxx"
5.	"YOU"

== Charts ==
Chart	Peak position
Oricon Daily albums	4
Oricon Weekly albums	4
