= Jyukai (band) =

Japanese musical duo

Jyukai 樹海
- Origin: Japan
- Genres: Pop
- Years active: 2004-2010
- Labels: Sistus Records
- Members: Watanabe Manami 渡辺 愛未; Yoshiaki Dewa 出羽良彰
- Website: Jyukai's Official Website

Jyukai (樹海, Jukai) was a musical duo from Japan. They were active in the late 2010s and are mainly known for performing the ending themes of the Fate/stay night 2006 anime.

== Members ==
Manami (愛未) was born Watanabe Manami (渡辺 愛未) on December 28, 1986 in Osaka, Japan. She is responsible for vocals and songwriting. She debuted as a solo artist in 2008, under the stage name "Aimmy". Her debut single, Blue Vibration / Kaze no Kioku ~To the End of the World~ (ブルー・バイブレーション / 風の記憶 ～to the end of the world～), reached #186 on the Oricon charts.

Yoshiaki Dewa (出羽 良彰), born in Osaka on February 26, 1984, handles programming, composition and arrangement.

== Discography ==
=== Maxi singles ===
#	Single information	Sales
Debut	Anata ga ita mori: Released: March 15, 2006; Catalog number: GNCX-0002; From album: Wild flower; Oricon top 200 position: #16	19,172
2nd	Koibito dōshi: Released: July 26, 2006; Catalog number: GNCX-0004; From album: Wild flower; Oricon top 200 position: #83	2,488
3rd	Hoshi akari: Released: November 1, 2006; Catalog number: GNCX-0006; From album: Wild flower; Oricon top 200 position: #84	1,902
4th	Sakasete wa ikenai hana: Released: April 25, 2007; Catalog number: GNCX-0008; From album: harvest; Oricon top 200 position: #130	760
5th	Komoriuta/Himegoto: Released: September 12, 2007; Catalog number: GNCX-0010; From album: harvest; Oricon top 200 position: #166	---
6th	Ai no hoshi/Hanamuke no merodī: Released: November 28, 2007; Catalog number: GNCX-0012; From album: harvest; Oricon top 200 position: #115	949

=== Albums ===
#	Album information	Sales
Debut	Wild Flower: Released: November 22, 2006; Catalog number: GNCX-1001; From singles: Anata ga Ita Mori, Koibito Doushi and Hoshi Akari; Oricon top 300 position: #49	7,609
2nd	Harvest: Released: December 12, 2007; Catalog number: GNCX-1003 (with DVD ed.)/GNCX-1004 (normal ed.); From singles: Sakasete wa Ikenai Hana, Komoriuta/Himegoto and Ai no Hoshi/Hanamuke no Melody; Oricon top 300 position: #84	2,425
1st compilation	Jyukai Best: Stairway to the Future: Released: January 20, 2010; Catalog number: GNCX-1009; Oricon top 300 position: #126	Unknown

== Anime series ==
Their song Anata ga Ita Mori, first track of their album Wild Flower is the ending song of episodes 01 to 13 and 15 to 23 of the anime adaptation of the Type-Moon visual novel Fate/Stay night. The third track, Hikari, is the ending of the 14th episode of the same series. The second track of the same album, Koibito Doushi, is the ending song of the episodes 12 to 24 of Aa Megami-sama: Sorezore no Tsubasa (Ah! My Goddess: Flights of fancy). Also, the seventh track, Hoshi Akari, is the ending song of the anime series Busou Renkin.
