= Michi Madness =

Studio album by MiChi
- Released: 27 June 2008
- Recorded: 2007–2008
- Genre: Dance, dance-pop, pop-rock
- Label: Mmm Records
- Producer: Tomokazu Matsuzawa

MiChi chronology
Michi Madness (2008)	Up to You (2009)

Michi Madness (stylized as MiChi MadNesS) is the first album released by British-Japanese musician MiChi, released on 27 June 2008. It was released on Mmm Records, an independent record label. The album includes four cover songs originally by The Spice Girls, Queen, Des'ree, and Fergie. "Surrender" was featured on a dance compilation album titled Freedom-House Mode Collection. The album peaked at number 142 on the Japanese Oricon charts and had a chart run of six weeks.

== Track listing ==
1. Fuck You And Your Money
2. We Will Rock You (Originally by Queen)
3. London Bridge (Originally by Fergie)
4. Spread Your Wings
5. Wannabe (Originally by The Spice Girls)
6. Real
7. Madness Vol.2
8. Surrender
9. You Gotta Be (Originally by Des'ree)
10. Spread Your Wings (Remix)
11. Madness Vol.2 (D.O.I Remix)
