= Sachi Tainaka =

Japanese singer (born 1986)

Sachi Tainaka タイナカ サチ
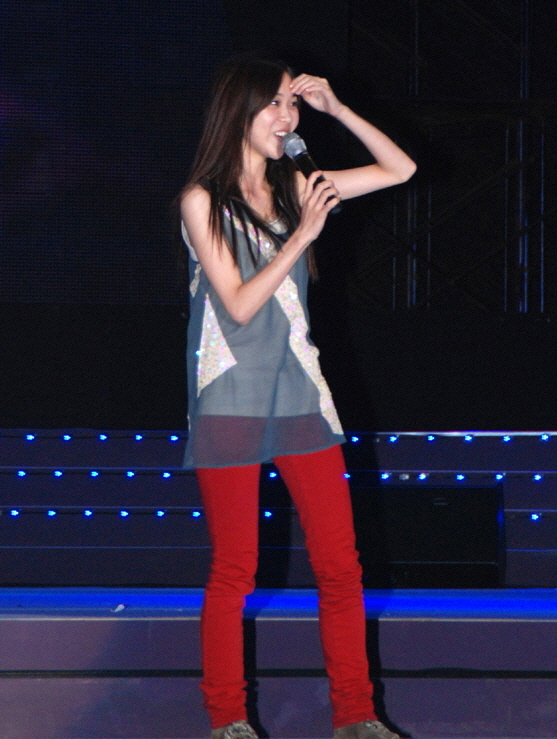

Background information
- Born: 田井中彩智; April 30, 1986 (age 40)
- Origin: Kakogawa, Hyōgo Prefecture, Japan
- Genre: J-pop
- Occupations: Singer, song-writer
- Instruments: Vocals, piano
- Years active: 2006–present
- Labels: Sistus Records (2006 until 2010); Tutu Records/BounDEE (since 2010)
- Website: https://tainakasachi.net/

Sachi Tainaka (タイナカ彩智, Tainaka Sachi; born April 30, 1986) is a Japanese singer who is best known for her vocals in the opening songs of the anime version of Fate/stay night. She has a 3½-octave vocal range.

Although her name was written in katakana, her birth name is written in kanji. However, as of December 2010, she chose to write her first name in Kanji.

== Discography ==
=== Singles ===
#	Single information	Sales
Debut	disillusion: Released: February 22, 2006; From album: Dear…; Oricon top 200 position: #13; Theme song from: Fate/stay night	35,000
2nd	Kirameku Namida wa Hoshi ni: Released: May 31, 2006; From album: Dear…; Oricon top 200 position: #9; Theme song from: Fate/stay night	25,632
3rd	Saikō no Kataomoi: Released: August 30, 2006; From album: Dear…; Oricon top 200 position: #50; Theme song from: Saiunkoku Monogatari	11,642
4th	Aitai yo. / Kimi to no Ashita: Released: February 7, 2007; From album: Dear…; Oricon top 200 position: #19; Theme song from: Fate/stay night	12,352
5th	Itoshii Hito e: Released: June 6, 2007; From album: Love is...; Oricon top 200 position: #67; Theme song from: Moribito: Guardian of the Spirit	3,891
6th	Lipstick/Ichiban Boshi: Released: November 7, 2007; From album: Love is...; Oricon top 200 position: #63; Theme song from: Prin-ce, PERSONA	2,000+
7th	Visit of love: Released: January 23, 2008; From album: Love is...; Oricon top 200 position: #82; Theme song from: Prin-ce, PERSONA	1,708
8th	Mou Kiss Sarechatta: Released: July 23, 2008; From album: Destiny; Oricon top 200 position: #58	2,000+
9th	Mata Ashita ne/Code: Released: October 22, 2008; From album: Destiny; Oricon top 200 position: #60; Theme song from: Prin-ce 2, Selection X The Museum, Fate/unlimited codes	2,949
10th	Unmeibito: Released: August 26, 2009; From album: Destiny; Oricon top 200 position: #116	800+
11th	Voice: Tadoritsuku Basho: Released: January 20, 2010; Oricon top 200 position: #20; From album: NA	4,902
12th	Disillusion 2010: Released: January 22, 2010; Oricon top 200 position: #30; From album: NA	2,888
13th	Hanabi / Life: Released: July 27, 2011; Oricon top 200 position: #xx; From album: Flower Dance	N/A
14th	Hitotsubu: Released: December 12, 2012	N/A
15th	Arknights: Released: October 11, 2020	N/A

=== Albums ===
#	Album information	Sales
Debut	Dear…: Released: March 7, 2007; From singles: disillusion, Kirameku Namida wa Hoshi ni, Saikō no Kataomoi, and Aitai yo. / Kimi to no Ashita; Oricon top 300 position: #33	12,000
2nd	Love is...: Released: February 13, 2008; From singles: Itoshii Hito e, Lipstick/Ichiban Boshi, and Visit of love; Oricon top 300 position: #30	9,000+
3rd	Destiny: Oricon top 300 position: #60; Released: September 16, 2009	3,906
4th	innocent: Oricon top 300 position: #145; Released: March 2, 2011	NA
5th	Flower Dance: Oricon top 300 position: #279; Released: February 22, 2012	NA
6th	123: Oricon top 300 position: N/A; Released: July 10, 2013	NA
7th	tomori: Released: May 27, 2015	NA
8th	Aoi Senaka: Released: October 26, 2016	NA
9th	Cat's Cradle: Released: May 23, 2018	NA
10th	Kokuu: Released: June 9, 2021	NA

=== Cover albums ===
#	Single information	Sales
1st	Mariage -tribute to Fate-: Oricon top 300 position: #61; Released: December 23, 2009	4,118

=== DVDs ===
- Tainaka Sachi Live 2007 ~Dear...~ (タイナカ サチ LIVE 2007 ～Dear...～) – Ranked No. 93
- タイナカ サチ LIVE 2008 ～Love is...～ (Tainaka Sachi Live 2008 ~Love is...~) – Ranked No. 151

== Notes ==
- Sachi admitted that Aitai yo is actually a song that she wrote to express her feelings when she had to leave the person she loved during the summer of 2006. She also admits that her lyrics was soaked with tears by the time she was finished writing them, and that the greatest thing about singers is that they can express their true feelings honestly through melody and voice.
