= Fate/Extra Last Encore =

2018 Japanese anime television series

- Promotional media for Fate/Extra Last Encore. Featuring: Nero Claudius (bottom center left), Hakuno Kishinami (bottom center right), Gawain (left), Twice H. Pieceman (top left), Leonardo Bistario Harwey (top right)
- フェイト／エクストラ ラストアンコール
- Type: TV series
- Based on: Fate/Extra
- Created by: Type-Moon; Marvelous
- Directed by: Akiyuki Shinbo; Yukihiro Miyamoto
- Series composition: Kinoko Nasu
- Screenplay by: Kinoko Nasu; Hikaru Sakurai
- Character designers: Masaaki Takiyama; Hiroki Yamamura
- Music by: Satoru Kōsaki
- No. of episodes: 13 (list of episodes)

Production
- Art director: Takuma Mochizuki
- Sound director: Youta Tsuruoka
- Cinematographer: Takayuki Aizu
- Color designer: Hitoshi Hibino
- CG directors: Shinya Takano; Hisato Shima
- Editor: Rie Matsubara
- Animation producer: Kazumasa Amitani
- Studio: Shaft
- Producers: Shizuka Kurosaki; Yoshiaki Matsumoto
- Production companies: Aniplex; Marvelous; Type-Moon (Note: Credited under their business name, Notes.); Shaft
- Runtime: 24–50 minutes

Original release
- Network: Tokyo MX
- Release: January 28 – July 19, 2018

Fate/Extra Last Encore (Japanese: フェイト／エクストラ ラストアンコール, Hepburn: Feito/Ekusutora Rasuto Ankōru) is a 2018 Japanese anime television series produced by Shaft as part of the Fate franchise by Type-Moon. It aired from January 28 to July 29, 2018 and was directed by Akiyuki Shinbo and Yukihiro Miyamoto, with scripts by Kinoko Nasu and Hikaru Sakurai.

The story follows amnesiac protagonist Hakuno Kishinami and his Servant Nero, a female incarnation of the Roman emperor Nero Claudius, as they take part in a deadly tournament and ascend the virtual world of SE.RA.PH in search of wish-granting artefact.

Although based on the role-playing video game Fate/Extra from 2010, it is not a faithful adaptation but rather an alternate-history continuation that diverges near the end of the game's narrative and follows a different continuity within the Fate/Extra setting.

Critical reception to Fate/Extra Last Encore was mixed. Reviewers consistently praised its ambitious visual presentation and the characterization of Nero, while criticizing its opaque storytelling, heavy fanservice, reliance on prior familiarity with the Fate franchise, and the comparatively subdued characterization of protagonist Hakuno Kishinami.

== Plot ==
The series is set around 2030 on an alternate-history Earth where the depletion of magical energy has brought conventional civilization to collapse. Humanity's last hope lies in the Moon Cell Automaton, an ancient artificial intelligence on the Moon that contains a record of human history and hosts a virtual environment known as SE.RA.PH. Within this digital realm, participants known as Masters compete in the Moon Holy Grail War, fighting alongside Servants—recreations of historical, legendary, and mythical figures—for the opportunity to obtain the wish-granting power of the Holy Grail.

The protagonist, Hakuno Kishinami, awakens in SE.RA.PH with no memories of his identity and is accompanied by Nero Claudius, also known as Servant Saber, a female incarnation of the Roman emperor Nero. As the story progresses, Hakuno discovers that he is not an ordinary human but an artificial being formed from the accumulated data and regrets of the many Masters who perished during the endless conflict.

As Hakuno and Nero ascend through the structure of SE.RA.PH, they encounter Masters and Servants trapped in a tournament that has remained suspended for approximately one thousand years after the apparent victory of Twice H. Pieceman. Each level presents opponents whose prolonged existence has left them psychologically or philosophically transformed by centuries of repetition and stagnation.

=== Relation to Fate/Extra ===
Fate/Extra Last Encore is not a straightforward adaptation of Fate/Extra; while it was conceived as a sequel, it diverges from the game before its end, and has been described as an alternate-history or "bad end" route of Fate/Extra rather than a direct adaptation. Its point of divergence occurs near the conclusion of Fate/Extra. In the Fate/Extra Last Encore route the original protagonist is defeated by Twice H. Pieceman, leading to a new storyline centred on a second, now-male, version of Hakuno Kishinami whose origins become one of the series' central mysteries. As a result, the anime functions simultaneously as a continuation and a reimagining within one branch of the wider Fate multiverse.

== Production ==
An anime adaptation of the Fate/Extra game was first announced on March 22, 2016, at the AnimeJapan Fate Project panel. Shaft was revealed to be handling the animation with Kinoko Nasu returning as the writer. In March 2017, some artwork revealed the game's male protagonist with Saber.

The anime was directed by Akiyuki Shinbo and Yukihiro Miyamoto, with scripts by Kinoko Nasu and Hikaru Sakurai. Character designs were provided by Masaaki Takiyama and Hiroki Yamamura, who also served as chief animation directors, while Satoru Kōsaki composed the music. Riki Matsuura, Kousuke Murayama, and Rina Iwamoto of CUES served as the main animators. On July 30, Atsushi Abe and Sakura Tange were confirmed to voice Hakuno Kishinami and Saber respectively.

The opening theme is "Bright Burning Shout" by Takanori Nishikawa, while the ending theme is "Tsuki to Hanataba" (月と花束, Moon and Bouquet) by Sayuri.

== Release and distribution ==
The series premiered January 28, 2018, on Tokyo MX, with further broadcasts on Gunma TV, Tochigi TV, BS11, and MBS. The final 3 episode arc "Illustrias Geocentrism" aired on July 29 and August 5.

Netflix licensed the series for worldwide online streaming before giving the rights to Aniplex of America, who later released the series on Blu-ray in North America.

== Themes ==
According to Piotr Konieczny of The Encyclopedia of Science Fiction, the series explores questions of identity, memory and agency through Hakuno's status as an artificial being created from accumulated digital memories rather than an individual human. By relocating the Holy Grail War into a virtual environment governed by artificial intelligence, it emphasizes themes of virtual reality and posthuman identity, framing the narrative in science-fictional rather than occult terms. Due to this, the Fate/Extra universe is the most SF-heavy universe out of all Fate storylines (universes).

The work also continues the Fate franchise's practice of reinterpreting historical figures through characters such as Nero Claudius and Francis Drake, depicting them as gender-swapped female incarnations.

== Reception ==
Writing for The Encyclopedia of Science Fiction, Piotr Konieczny praised the series' exploration of existential themes such as identity alongside its ambitious world-building, but considered its demanding narrative structure, slow pacing and extensive exposition significant barriers for newcomers. Similarly, Theron Martin of Anime News Network awarded the series a C+, criticizing its incoherent narrative and unclear character motivations while praising the creativity of Shaft's visual design and arguing that Nero's energetic personality carried the show in contrast to Hakuno's subdued characterization. In a separate Anime News Network discussion, Nicholas Dupree and Jacob Chapman likewise argued that the anime's dependence on knowledge of the original game and deliberately opaque storytelling made it difficult to follow even for long-time franchise fans, while identifying Nero as the emotional centre of the series and praising its stylized visual direction.

At Anime UK News, Darkstorm argued that unlike the previous anime entry in the franchise, Fate/Apocrypha of 2017, Last Encore assumes familiarity with the concepts of the Fate universe and retains the floor-by-floor structure of a dungeon-crawling role-playing game, although the reviewer praised the gradual revelation of character backstories, Nero's charismatic personality and Shaft's imaginative backgrounds. Reviewing the concluding Illustrias Geocentrism Theory episodes, the same critic felt that philosophical discussions and exposition came at the expense of emotional impact. The reviewer award the main arc (episodes 1-10) a score of 7/10, while the ending arc a score of 5/10.

James Mizutani of Anime Trending awarded the series 58/100. While praising Shaft's visual direction, soundtrack, environmental design and Sakura Tange's performance as Saber, he concluded that the unconventional pacing and narrative structure made the anime difficult to follow and recommended it primarily to established fans of the franchise, considering it one of the weaker animated entries in the Fate series.

Reviewing the premiere for Anime Feminist, Caitlin Moore was considerably more negative, calling the series "terrible" and criticizing its reliance on technobabble, passive protagonist, and excessive visual style. Moore questioned the decision to use the male version of Hakuno, suggesting that adapting the female protagonist of the game could have provided opportunities for queer representation. She also criticized the presentation of several female characters, particularly Nero's revealing costume. The exaggerated fanservice-focused design of female characters has also been observed by several other reviewers.
