= Nero Claudius =

Nero Claudius can refer to:

- Nero (37–68), a Roman emperor whose full name was Nero Claudius Caesar Augustus Germanicus
- Nero Claudius Drusus (38–9 BC), commonly known in English as Drusus the Elder, a Roman general and politician
- Nero Claudius, a fictional character from the Fate franchise
