= Fate/Extella Link =

2018 action video game

- Cover art featuring Tamamo no Mae (left), Charlemagne (center), and Nero Claudius (right).
- Developer: Marvelous First Studio
- Publisher: Marvelous
- Director: Hiromi Sakamoto
- Producer: Kenichiro Tsukuda
- Artist: Arco Wada
- Writers: Yūichirō Higashide; Ukyō Kodachi
- Composers: Keiichi Okabe; Ryuichi Takada; Keigo Hoashi; Shotaro Seo
- Series: Fate
- Platforms: PlayStation 4, PlayStation Vita, Nintendo Switch, Windows
- Release: PlayStation 4, PlayStation Vita: JP: June 7, 2018; WW: March 19, 2019; Nintendo Switch: JP: January 31, 2019; WW: March 19, 2019; Windows: WW: March 19, 2019; Android, iOS: JP: 22 July 2020
- Genres: Action role-playing, hack and slash
- Modes: Single-player, multiplayer

Fate/Extella Link (Note: Japanese: フェイト／エクステラ リンク, Hepburn: Feito/Ekusutera Rinku) is an action role-playing game developed by Marvelous and published internationally by Xseed Games. It was released for PS4 in Japan in 2018, and later worldwide for PS4, Nintendo Switch and PC in 2019. It is part of the Fate franchise, the fourth game in the Fate/Extra series, and a sequel to Fate/Extella: The Umbral Star. The game features a new storyline set after the events of the previous game, with the protagonist and allied Servants confronting an invasion led by a hostile force seeking to assimilate the inhabitants of the Moon through a process known as "Oraclization".

Upon release in Japan, the game topped the national sales charts. Reviewers generally regarded Fate/Extella Link as an improvement over Fate/Extella: The Umbral Star, praising its expanded roster, progression systems, replayability, and combat mechanics. Critics also highlighted the game's appeal to existing fans of the Fate franchise, while noting that its extensive lore and terminology could make it less accessible to newcomers. Some reviewers additionally criticized the game's multiplayer component and its reliance on elements inherited from its predecessor.

== Development and release ==
The game was developed by Marvelous 1st Studio as the latest entry in the series that begun with Fate/Extra in 2010. Kinoko Nasu served as supervisor, while the scenario was written by Yuichiro Higashide and Ukyo Kodachi of Team Barrel Roll. Character designs were created by Arco Wada, with music by Keiichi Okabe and Monaca. Producer Kenichiro Tsukuda oversaw development. Song "Justice" by Luna Haruna was used as the opening theme to the game.

Marvelous announced in January 2018 that Fate/Extella Link would be released in Japan for PlayStation 4 and PlayStation Vita on June 7, 2018. The Nintendo Switch version was released in Japan on January 31, 2019. In conjunction with its release, Marvelous began distributing additional downloadable content, including the playable character Altera Larva, a younger version of Altera, and a series of mascot-like "Funifuni" costume sets. The game was later localized for international markets and released internationally for PlayStation 4, Nintendo Switch and Windows in March 2019. Digital pre-orders of the PlayStation Store version included an alternate costume for Artoria Pendragon known as "Alteraria". In 2020 the Japanese version of the game was released on mobile for Android and iOS.

The game was conceived as a new chapter in the Fate/Extella series centered on the newly introduced Servant Charlemagne and featuring an expanded roster of Servants drawn from across the wider Fate franchise.

== Gameplay ==
Fate/Extella Link is an action game in which players control Servants based on historical and mythological figures while battling large numbers of enemies across battlefield maps. The game expanded the roster with ten newly introduced Servants, which brings the total to twenty-six playable Servants/ Combat has multiple difficulty settings, and is centered on basic attacks and increasingly powerful special abilities. Players can perform Drive Skills, which build a meter used to unleash Noble Phantasms, powerful screen-clearing attacks accompanied by animated summoning sequences.

The game's combat system combines two-button combo attacks with character-specific active skills. Each playable character can equip four active skills, ranging from offensive techniques to temporary buffs. Additional mechanics include powerful super moves and a "rush" system used during encounters with stronger opponents. The new titular "Link" system allows characters fighting near allied Servants to temporarily share their partner's class abilities.

Battles take place across maps divided into sectors or rooms controlled by either allied or enemy forces. Players capture territory by defeating enemy commanders while responding to changing battlefield objectives such as defending allied units or confronting newly appeared powerful enemies. Progression systems allow Servants to gain new abilities and equip passive enhancements, while completing optional objectives can unlock additional rewards and character upgrades.

The game's story mode is structured around a branching mission system represented by a flowchart. Players may revisit earlier missions, experiment with different characters, and unlock costumes and support conversations. The story campaign branches into multiple routes, including a "true" route unlocked after completing the initial story paths. In addition to the main story, the game features a secondary mission mode consisting of more than forty extra missions designed for character progression and item acquisition. The game also introduced a multiplayer mode to the Fate/Extra series of games. PlayStation 4 multiplayer features included online four-versus-four battles, while the Nintendo Switch version additionally supports local wireless multiplayer; multiplayer was also added to the PC version.

== Plot ==
The game is set within the virtual realm of SE.RA.PH, where the surviving remnants of humanity have uploaded their consciousness and historical figures exist as powerful digital entities known as Servants. These Servants, together with their Masters, compete for control of the Moon Cell supercomputer. Following the events of Fate/Extella: The Umbral Star, the player assumes the role of a male or female Master who previously won a conflict for control of the Moon, joins forces with the newly introduced Servant Charlemagne. While searching for Altera, they confront a mysterious force, soon revealed to be the Servant Rex Magnus Kar, that is attempting to brainwash Servants and assimilate the inhabitants of the Moon through a process known as Oraclization..

=== Characters ===
The twenty six Servants who may join the player's party are characters based on figures such as Altera, Archimedes, Arjuna, Artoria Pendragon, Astolfo, Charlemagne, Cú Chulainn, Darius III, Elizabeth Báthory, Francis Drake, Gawain, Gilgamesh, Gilles de Rais, Iskandar, Jeanne d'Arc, Karna, Lancelot, Li Shuwen, Lu Bu, Medusa, Nameless, Roman emperor Nero Claudius (a gender-swapped character), Rex Magnus (an alter ego of Charlemagne), Robin Hood, Scáthach, and Tamamo no Mae.

== Reception ==
Reception

Aggregate score
Aggregator	Score
Metacritic	75/100 (18 reviews)

Review scores
Publication	Score
IGN	8/10
Nintendo Life	8/10
Nintendo World Report	7.5/10
Push Square	7/10
RPGamer	3.5/5
RPG Site	8/10

The game received a Metacritic score of 75.

Writing for IGN Spain, Elias Sampayo awarded the game 8 out of 10. He praised its expanded roster, visual improvements, story, and overall amount of content, describing it as a significant evolution of its predecessor. However, he argued that the game was aimed primarily at existing fans of the franchise and noted that its combination of visual-novel storytelling and musou gameplay would not appeal to all players.

Writing for Kotaku, Mike Fahey praised the game's reinterpretation of historical figures and described its combat as enjoyable "hack and slash popcorn". He highlighted the large cast of Servants, battlefield action, and character customization systems, while criticizing the reuse of battlefields from Fate/Extella: The Umbral Star and arguing that the competitive multiplayer mode was poorly suited to the game's combat mechanics.

Writing for Nintendo Life, Mitch Vogel awarded the Nintendo Switch version 8 out of 10. He praised the game's battlefield design, combat mechanics, progression systems, replayability, visual presentation, and soundtrack. Vogel considered it an improvement over Fate/Extella: The Umbral Star, writing that it refined the formula established by its predecessor while adding new systems and content. He also noted that the game remained heavily dependent on established Fate lore, which could make it difficult for newcomers to follow the story and terminology.

Nintendo World Report's Donald Theriault awarded the Nintendo Switch version a score of 7.5 out of 10. He praised the game's combat system, replayability, and the ability to skip lengthy Noble Phantasm cutscenes. Criticism focused on its graphics and soundtrack, which he considered unremarkable, occasional handheld performance issues, and reliance on anime conventions and franchise-specific terminology. Theriault concluded that the game would be most appealing to existing fans of the Fate franchise.

Writing for Push Square, Robert Ramsey awarded the PlayStation 4 version 7 out of 10. He described the game as a refined sequel that improved on Fate/Extella: The Umbral Star through its larger roster, expanded mission selection, additional unlockable skills, and character bonding system. He praised the combat mechanics, progression systems, and replay value, but felt that the game relied heavily on assets and interface elements inherited from its predecessor. Ramsey also criticized the competitive multiplayer mode, describing it as underdeveloped and less enjoyable than the single-player content.

Writing for RPGamer, Elmon Dean Todd awarded the game 3.5 out of 5. He praised the fast-paced combat, character customization systems, art style, and replayability, describing the game as a substantial improvement over Fate/Extella: The Umbral Star. Criticism focused on the game's low difficulty, repetitive mission structure, lack of cooperative play, and sparsely populated multiplayer mode. Todd also described the story as convoluted and potentially confusing for newcomers to the franchise.

Writing for RPG Site, Josh Torres awarded the game 8 out of 10. He regarded it as a significant improvement over Fate/Extella: The Umbral Star, praising its faster pace, revised combat systems, quality-of-life improvements, and expanded roster of playable characters. Torres considered the story less ambitious than its predecessor and criticized the repetition of missions and reused stage layouts, but concluded that the game successfully refined the series' core gameplay.

=== Sales ===
Fate/Extella Link debuted at the top of the Japanese software sales charts following its release in June 2018. According to Media Create sales data reported by Push Square, the PlayStation 4 version sold 78,647 copies during its first week on sale, while the PlayStation Vita version sold 38,156 copies, for a combined total of 116,803 units.

== Legacy ==
Like with other Fate properties, characters introduced in Fate/Extella Link begun appearing in other Fate properties, such as Fate/Grand Order game, with Charlemagne being the first Link character to appear there (in 2022).
