= Fate/Extra CCC =

2013 role-playing video game

- Game cover art featuring Nero Claudius in her "Bride" dress (bottom) and BB (top).
- Genre: Science-fiction
- Video game

Fate/Extra CCC
- Developer: Imageepoch
- Publisher: Marvelous AQL
- Produced by: Hideyuki Mizutani
- Designed by: Kinoko Nasu; Takashi Takeuchi; Arco Wada
- Genre: Role-playing
- Platform: PlayStation Portable
- Released: JP: March 28, 2013
- Manga

Fate/Extra CCC FoxTail
- Written by: TYPE-MOON; Marvelous Entertainment
- Illustrated by: Takenoko Seijin
- Published by: Kadokawa
- Imprint: Kadokawa Comics Ace
- Magazine: Comp Ace
- Original run: October 2013 – present
- Volumes: 13
- Manga

Fate/Extra CCC
- Written by: TYPE-MOON; Marvelous
- Illustrated by: Robi~na
- Published by: Kadokawa
- Imprint: Kadokawa Comics Ace
- Magazine: Comptiq
- Original run: June 10, 2015 – December 8, 2023
- Volumes: 8

Fate/Extra CCC (Note: Japanese: フェイト／エクストラ CCC, Hepburn: Feito/Ekusutora CCC) is a 2013 role-playing video game developed by Imageepoch and published by Marvelous AQL for the PlayStation Portable. It is part of the Fate franchise and is set in the same digital world as the 2010 video game Fate/Extra, though in an alternate route that diverges from the events of that game; which has led to Fate/Extra CCC being described both as a sequel and a side-story to Fate/Extra.

The game is set in the year 2032 within SE.RA.PH., the virtual world of the Moon Cell. The participants of the Holy Grail War find themselves copied to the far side of the Moon Cell, where BB, an AI resembling Sakura Matou, has reconstructed the world and created the Sakura Labyrinth. The game follows the protagonist, Hakuno Kishinami, who becomes trapped within the Labyrinth and seeks to escape alongside their chosen Servant. He joins former allies and rivals, both Masters and Servants, many recurring characters from Fate/Extra, in exploring the labyrinth and uncovering the cause of the anomaly while seeking a means of escape.

The game was a commercial success in Japan and became the best-selling title in the Fate series at the time of release. Critical reception was generally positive, with reviewers praising its expanded visual novel-style storytelling, character-focused narrative, and refinements to the gameplay systems of Fate/Extra, while noting its significantly greater emphasis on fanservice and erotic themes. Despite its success in Japan, it has never received an international release; a fan translation patch was released in 2023.

The game received two manga adaptations. Fate/Extra CCC FoxTail (2013-ongoing) and Fate/Extra CCC (2015-2023). The game's events later served as the basis for recurring characters and storylines in subsequent entries in the franchise, particularly Fate/Grand Order. In the Fate/Extra continuity it was followed in 2016 by Fate/Extella: The Umbral Star.

== Development ==
The game was developed by Imageepoch and published by Marvelous AQL for the PlayStation Portable. It was released in Japan on March 28, 2013. It also had a special edition includes which included a figma (of Fate character Nero in a white "Bride" dress), an illustration book, and limited character song album.

Scenario was penned by Fate/Stay writer Kinoko Nasu, while character designers include Type-Moon artist Takashi Takeuchi and Arco Wada. Producer was Hideyuki Mizutani. Opening movie was done by Shaft, while the opening theme song, "Sakura Meikyuu", was done by Kanon Wakeshima, and the ending theme song, "Blossom", was sung by Sakura Tange.

Unlike Fate/Extra, which was localized in English by Aksys Games, Fate/Extra CCC was never officially released outside Japan. In December 2023, Iwakura Productions released an unofficial English fan translation patch for the game after several years of development.

Plans for Fate/Extra CCC originated during development of Fate/Extra. Producer Kazuya Niinō, a fan of Sakura Matou character, proposed a follow-up centered on Sakura and conceived a dungeon-based scenario involving multiple Sakura-derived characters. In a 2020 interview, Niinō recalled that he had only considered the project's realization about fifty percent likely and was pleased that it ultimately became a released game.

According to Kinoko Nasu, the original Fate/Extra was initially conceived primarily as an Imageepoch project with limited involvement from TYPE-MOON. During development, however, TYPE-MOON became increasingly involved in the game's scenario production. Niinō continued to advocate for a Sakura-focused sequel, and Nasu later joined CCC as its main scenario writer.

Development proceeded under a tight production schedule. Nasu recalled that, unlike a typical visual novel project, he was often unable to provide detailed instructions for character expressions, scene direction, or music cues, limiting many of his notes to broad directions for illustrations and cinematics. The game's story was divided into seven chapters. TYPE-MOON prepared the plots for chapters four and five, after which another writer produced initial drafts that Nasu subsequently revised.

Natsuko Ishikawa, who had previously assisted during development of Fate/Extra, joined the project as an event planner before later contributing scenario writing. When Nasu sought a writer who could be entrusted with an entire section of the scenario, he selected Ishikawa based on her earlier work. Because most of the game's remaining chapters had already been completed, chapters one and two were provided as models for her assignment. Ishikawa later recalled being impressed by the extensive stage directions in Nasu's manuscripts, which included notes on character emotions and foreshadowing.

The game was announced at a presentation held during Machi★Asobi Vol. 7 on October 9, 2011, attended by producer Hideyuki Mizutani and Sakura Tange, the voice actress for the game's Saber character. At the event, Mizutani described the game as depicting the "reverse side" of the previous Fate/Extra and confirmed that Saber, Archer, and Caster from that title would all return as selectable Servants. He also stated that the game would place greater emphasis on the player's relationship with their chosen Servant.

Mizutani described the newly introduced red-haired female character as similar in personality to Luviagelita Edelfelt from Fate/Hollow Ataraxia, calling her competent but somewhat unfortunate. The event also featured a video message from Sakura voice actress Noriko Shitaya, who revealed that she would voice both Sakura and a mysterious girl resembling her, prompting Mizutani to describe the project as a "Sakura festival".

According to a discussion between TYPE-MOON co-founder Takashi Takeuchi and Fate/Extra CCC FoxTail manga author Takenoko Seijin, the Sakura Five originated as a group of five Alter Egos during the early planning stages of Fate/Extra CCC. Although the concept was retained, only Passionlip and Meltlilith appeared in the released game; the other three characters appear only in the manga.

== Gameplay ==
Like its predecessor, Fate/Extra CCC features a command-based battle system built around a rock-paper-scissors relationship between the ATTACK, BREAK, and GUARD commands. Players must anticipate enemy actions and select commands accordingly. The game includes multiple difficulty settings that can be changed during play.

The player selects a gender of his Master protagonist, their Servant partner and explores the Sakura Labyrinth. Players may choose between Saber, Archer, Caster, and the newly added Gilgamesh as their Servant partner. Different Servants lead to different endings, increasing replay value.

Compared to Fate/Extra, the game removes dungeon time limits, introduces more frequent save points, reduces the amount of grinding required, and adds an auto-battle option that automatically selects advantageous commands against revealed enemy actions. Character information is gradually unlocked through the Information Matrix system, while character backstories and secrets can be explored through the SG (Secret Garden) system.

New Fate franchise characters who debuted in the game included BB, Passionlip, Meltlilith, and Sessyoin Kiara.

== Plot ==
The game is set in the Fate universe. The game has been described as both a sequel and a side story to Fate/Extra., as well as a "companion game" to that title. It presents another route that diverges at various points and offers a different ending, one that has been described as serving a role similar to the Heaven's Feel of Fate/Stay Night route within the broader Fate/Extra storyline. Nasu described the game as a sequel.

During the main round of the Holy Grail War, the protagonist helps Sakura Matou, who is in charge of the infirmary. Peaceful days then pass at Tsukumihara Academy, but an abnormal incident suddenly occurs when a black shadow attacks. The protagonist is cornered, but hears the voice of their Servant and escapes the crisis. The protagonist then wakes up in the old school building of Tsukumihara Academy. In this building, located in an unused area on the far side of the Moon Cell that is not used in the Holy Grail War, several Masters and Servants, NPCs, and others, including Leonardo's pair and Sakura Matou, have gathered. To return to the Holy Grail War, the protagonist and the others cooperate in an attempt to escape from the far side of the Moon.

The protagonist learns that they can return to the near side of the Moon by breaking through the dungeon called the "Sakura Labyrinth", which spreads out from the schoolyard of the old building, and begins exploring it. There, however, Tohsaka Rin, calling herself queen of the Moon, blocks the way with a new Servant, Lancer. With the help of Kiara Sessyoin, one of the Masters who had reached the old school building, the protagonist defeats Rin and restores her sanity. Immediately afterward, BB, a girl who closely resembles Sakura Matou, appears, and it is revealed that she has taken hold of the Moon Cell's power as the Holy Grail and caused the disturbance in order to destroy the Earth.

Rin, who had been brainwashed by BB, and Rani VIII, whom the protagonist later rescues, join the protagonist's side, but BB again stands in their way. BB displays powers that appear almost omnipotent and has Alter Egos, composite Heroic Spirits, under her command. While the protagonist fights a deadly battle with Passionlip, one of them, Jinako Carigiri, one of the Masters helping the protagonist, is captured by BB. After overcoming a fierce battle with Jinako's powerful hero Karna, the protagonist finally corners BB, but BB defeats Leonardo and Gawain when they rush to the scene. The protagonist is also imprisoned by BB, but returns to the old school building through the actions of Julius, who had been secretly maneuvering behind the scenes.

The protagonists defeat and seal Lancer, who had confronted them three times, but on the next floor they struggle against the second Alter Ego, Meltlilith, and Kiara exits the story during the conflict. Through Shinji Matou's life-risking actions, however, they find a way forward and drive Meltlilith back. To oppose BB's powerful authority, the protagonists enter the cyber-bodies of their Servants in order to awaken the Servants' power. With the assistance of the reformed Lancer, they succeed in strengthening the Servants. The protagonist then heads to the deepest part of the Sakura Labyrinth to restore BB's sanity and save the world.

BB, who awaits them at the core, reforms after receiving the protagonist's sincerity. Kiara Sessyoin, who was supposed to be dead, then appears with her Servant, Andersen. It is revealed that Kiara is the person who caused Sakura to go mad and is the true mastermind behind the incident. Having absorbed BB's authority and transformed into the Demonic Bodhisattva, Kiara corners the protagonists with overwhelming power, but BB's feelings for the protagonist, which Kiara was supposed to have absorbed, become an obstacle, and Kiara is defeated by the protagonist. With the help of the Servant and BB, the protagonist escapes the collapsing Sakura Labyrinth and returns to the near side of the Moon.

=== Characters ===
The player assumes the role of Hakuno Kishinami (岸波 白野), the protagonist of Fate/Extra, who again participates in events within the Moon Cell's virtual world. As in the previous game, the player may form a contract with one of three Servants: Saber (Nero Claudius), Archer (Nameless), or Caster (Tamamo-no-Mae). A fourth route, added in CCC, allows the player to partner with Gilgamesh.

Returning Masters from Fate/Extra include Rin Tohsaka, Rani VIII, Shinji Matou, Leo and Julius Harwey, Monji Gatou, and Twice H. Pieceman. Many become trapped on the far side of the Moon and form a student council that assists the protagonist in escaping BB's altered version of SE.RA.PH. The story introduces a new master, Jinako Carigiri, while the game's principal antagonist is Kiara Sessyoin, a participant in the Holy Grail War whose ambitions ultimately drive the central conflict.

Also debuting in CCC is Hans Christian Andersen, Kiara's Servant, and BB, a rogue AI derived from Sakura Matou, who has seized control of the Moon Cell's hidden domain and created the Sakura Labyrinth. Assisting her are the Sakura Five, a group of Alter Egos derived from aspects of BB's personality, two of which appear in the game: Passionlip and Meltlilith. Several Servants from previous Fate works also appear, including Elizabeth Báthory, Karna, Nursery Rhyme, Robin Hood and Gawain.

== Reception ==
The game sale numbers have initially been comparable to Fate/Extra. but within two months they have surpassed it, at which point the game became the best-selling title in the series.

Contemporary reviewers frequently highlighted Fate/Extra CCC's greater emphasis on erotic imagery and fanservice compared with Fate/Extra, while also noting that the game retained a substantial story focus and expanded narrative scope.

Famitsu awarded the game a score of 7.2 out of 10, with four individual reviewer scores of 8, 7, 7, and 7. The reviewers praised the game's visual novel-style storytelling, strategic battle system, replay value, and quality-of-life improvements over Fate/Extra, including additional save opportunities and automated battle functions. Reviewers also highlighted the appeal of the game's Servants, particularly the newly playable Gilgamesh. Criticism focused on long loading times, a slow opening section, and pacing issues associated with some quest and dungeon sequences.

Writing for Dengeki Online, Kawachi praised the game for retaining the atmosphere of Fate/Extra while expanding its mysteries and character-focused storytelling. The review also highlighted the title's stronger sensual and arguably erotic tone, replay value arising from different Servant routes, and gameplay refinements such as the auto-battle system.

Writing for Rice Digital, Shadocchi wrote that Fate/Extra CCC expanded upon the setting and story of Fate/Extra while placing a greater emphasis on narrative, describing it as "much more of a visual novel" than its predecessor. The review also praised gameplay refinements, additional costume options, and expanded character interactions, while noting the game's strong emphasis on fanservice.

== Adaptations and related media ==
=== Fate/Extra CCC FoxTail ===
Fate/Extra CCC FoxTail (フェイト/エクストラ CCC FoxTail) is a manga series based on an original concept by TYPE-MOON and illustrated by Takenoko Seijin. It has been serialized in Comp Ace since the December 2013 issue. The collected volumes are published by Kadokawa under the Kadokawa Comics Ace imprint. The series was originally announced under the provisional title Fate/Extra Yōkoden. When the first chapter was published, it appeared under the title Fate/Extra Mikōn! Cas-ko-chan!? as part of an effort to mislead readers into thinking it was a school-parody manga. Beginning with the second chapter, serialization continued under its current title. While based on CCC, the story is an original scenario incorporating unused concepts and elements later seen in Fate/Grand Order. The protagonist is male and his Servant is Caster (Tamamo-no-Mae).

==== Production (FoxTail) ====
Takenoko Seijin first became involved with the Fate series through Koi Suru Otome, included in the Fate/Prototype Tribute Phantasm anthology. Takashi Takeuchi felt from that work that Takenoko Seijin excelled at action scenes, and after consulting with the editorial staff decided that he should create a work starring Caster that would differ from a straightforward manga adaptation. Takenoko Seijin himself had wanted to create an action-oriented manga and later recalled in a discussion with Takeuchi that he was excited when he received the offer.

At that point the game had not yet been released, and the manga was planned as an Extra side story focused on Caster. It was expected to run only one or two tankōbon volumes. About six months before the game's release, Kinoko Nasu introduced the concept of the Sakura Five, resulting in FoxTail being repositioned as a subsidiary route of CCC. Nasu also presented the rough outline of the story to the staff during this period. The original plan for the game included five Alter Egos as the Sakura Five, but only Passionlip and Meltlilith appeared in the released game. FoxTail was developed in part to make use of those unused characters, introducing the remaining three Alter Egos (Kingprotea, Kazuradrop and Violet). Takenoko Seijin and Takashi Takeuchi discussed the work in a commemorative roundtable for the second volume, explaining the relationship between the manga and unused ideas from the game.

The idea of making the Saber opposing Caster into Suzuka Gozen originated with Takenoko Seijin. To pair her with Caster, several design elements similar to Caster's were incorporated, with Takeuchi comparing the design relationship to Atom and Atlas in Astro Boy. Suzuka was initially designed as a gentle-looking character resembling Arcueid from Tsukihime, but the staff felt the design lacked individuality and did not fit the Fate setting. Nasu later requested that her facial features be made sharper, while Takeuchi suggested making her a high-school girl. Takenoko Seijin later stated that these suggestions were extremely helpful. Writer Ryō Morise, who assists TYPE-MOON with historical research and setting analysis for the Fate series, also contributed to the development of Suzuka Gozen's background.

Takenoko Seijin stated in an interview that he approached the battle scenes through trial and error. One sequence he particularly struggled with was the volume 2 chapter featuring Suzuka Gozen, Meltlilith, and Passionlip together. Because Meltlilith and Passionlip had already appeared in Fate/Extra CCC, the scene was originally intended to be brief, but encouragement from editor Fujiwara led to a larger battle sequence than initially planned.

==== Presentation ====
The manga is positioned as a subsidiary route of the original CCC storyline, while also being designed so that readers who have not played either Fate/Extra or Fate/Extra CCC can still enjoy it.

Reflecting Caster's characterization as an intelligent strategist, the series places particular emphasis on tactical maneuvering during battles. Combat scenes are presented as Takenoko Seijin's visual interpretation of Fate/Extra CCC's battle system, and some scenes also draw inspiration from Fate/Grand Order.

=== Fate/Extra CCC manga version ===
A manga adaptation titled Fate/Extra CCC, illustrated by Robi~na, was serialized in Comptiq from the July 2015 issue to the January 2024 issue. It began on June 10, 2015, and ended on December 8, 2023. The series consists of eight volumes.

=== Collaborations with other works ===
In 2018 Fate/Extra and Fate/Extra CCC received a collaboration event with another Fate franchise game, Fate/Grand Order, through which new characters introduced in these game were added to the Fate/Grand Order rooster of characters,

=== Sequel ===
The next game in the series was Fate/Extella: The Umbral Star, released in 2016.
