= Fate (franchise) =

Video game and media franchise

- Genres: Action, visual novel, fantasy, supernatural
- Publishers: JP: Type-Moon; WW: Aniplex; EU: Ghostlight, NIS America, Xseed Games
- Creators: Takashi Takeuchi; Kinoko Nasu
- Platforms: PlayStation 2, Android, iOS, PlayStation Vita, Windows, PlayStation 4, Nintendo Switch
- First release: Fate/Stay Night; January 30, 2004
- Latest release: Fate/Samurai Remnant; September 18, 2023

Fate (Note: Japanese: フェイト, Hepburn: Feito) is a Japanese multimedia franchise created by author Kinoko Nasu and artist Takashi Takeuchi for Type-Moon. The franchise primarily focuses on the Holy Grail War; a conflict between mages called Masters and their "heroic spirits" called Servants who are incarnations of figures from mythology and history. The visual novel Fate/Stay Night was released for Windows in January 2004. A spin-off visual novel titled Fate/Hollow Ataraxia was released in October 2005. Subsequent entries have continued to release under the form of light novels, manga, video games, and more, while being adapted to other formats.

Fate/Stay Night followed the success of Type-Moon's previous visual novel, Tsukihime, which released in 2000. Prior to creating Fate/Stay Night, Nasu wrote the light novel series The Garden of Sinners between 1998-1999, and an unreleased novel in 1996 called Witch on the Holy Night which would later be reworked as a visual novel and released in 2012. The Fate franchise is connected to Nasu's other works through a multiverse.

== Premise ==
The Fate franchise revolves around a fictional conflict known as the Holy Grail War, originally styled as a battle royale style conflict taking place in the fictional Fuyuki City. Seven mages known as "Masters" each summon a heroic spirit, incarnations of figures from mythology and history, known as "Servants." The pairs battle until only one remains. The victors get to make a wish from the Holy Grail.

Servants belong to different classes. The basic seven classes are Saber, Archer, Lancer, Rider, Assassin, Caster, and Berserker. Newer entries continue to introduce new classes such as Avenger (Fate/Hollow Ataraxia), Ruler (Fate/Apocrypha), and Shielder (Fate/Grand Order). Classes are selected based off attributes gained by the Servants in their lives, and attribute certain skills and stats based off their categorization.

Subsequent entries have modified the Holy Grail War format. For example, in the 2010 RPG Fate/Extra, the war takes the form of a single-elimination tournament. In the 2012 light novel series Fate/Apocrypha, the war is fought between two teams of seven pairs.

Not all Fate franchise works take place in the same timeline, and it's common for new pieces of media to create their own world lines. Fate/Apocrypha's events are caused by the Holy Grail being stolen during the events of Fuyuki's Third Holy Grail War, while the manga series Fate/type Redline features a Holy Grail War held in Tokyo during World War II.

Fate's installments relationships

== History ==
=== 2004–2006: Conception and first games ===
Release timeline
2004	Fate/Stay Night
2005	Fate/Hollow Ataraxia
2006	Fate/Zero
2007	Fate/Tiger Colosseum
2007	Fate/kaleid liner Prisma Illya
2008	Fate/Unlimited Codes
2009
2010	Fate/Extra
2011
2012	Fate/Apocrypha
2013	Fate/Extra CCC
2014	The Case Files of Lord El-Melloi II
2015	Fate/Strange Fake
2015	Fate/Grand Order
2016	Today's Menu for the Emiya Family
2016	Fate/Extella: The Umbral Star
2017
2018	Fate/Extella Link
2019
2020
2021
2022
2023	Fate/Samurai Remnant

Japanese author Kinoko Nasu co-founded the doujin circle Type-Moon with artist Takashi Takeuchi. After the success of their first visual novel Tsukihime in 2000, Type-Moon transitioned from a dōjin soft organization to a commercial organization and released its sequel Kagetsu Tohya, the next year. Nasu initially started writing Fate/Stay Night as a novel in high school and college, without the intention of making it a game, and only wrote what became the game's Fate route. However, it went on to have three routes, with the other two—Unlimited Blade Works and Heaven's Feel, reimagining situations that had occurred in the original storyline. In his earlier drafts, Nasu conceived the series' primary mascot and heroine, Saber as a man, and its main protagonist Shirou, as a girl with glasses. This early draft was later embodied in the short original video animation (OVA) Fate/Prototype, which was released with the final volume of the Carnival Phantasm OVA series. Each route is set on different perspectives of Shirou's ideals, and develops his relationship with one of main heroines. Nasu had that all the routes had different themes, with the first being an "ideal form", the second as a "battle with oneself", and the third, as "the friction between ideal and reality". Starting to fully operate as a company, Type-Moon released a demo of its first commercial product, Fate/Stay Night, on a CD included with the December issue of the magazine Tech Gian from Enterbrain on October 21, 2003. That same demo would also be released as a download on November 1 through Type-Moon's website. In January 2004, Fate/Stay Night was released, and quickly became a commercial success, spawning the Fate franchise.

A sequel to Stay/Night, Fate/Hollow Ataraxia, was released on October 28, 2005. The game was developed and designed as a fan-disc. Fate/Stay Night would later be turned into a 24-episode TV anime by Studio Deen, airing from January 7 to June 17, 2006; a second anime series premiered on October 4, 2014. A manga series to promote the anime started publication on December 26, 2005, in Kadokawa Shoten's magazine Monthly Shōnen Ace, which had its conclusion on November 17, 2012, with its 20th volume. Fate/Stay Night was also released for the PS2 platform on April 19, 2007.

In a collaboration between Type-Moon and Nitro+, writer Gen Urobuchi penned a light novel prequel to Fate/Stay Night titled Fate/Zero, which Nasu supervised and Takeuchi illustrated. Its first volume released on December 29, 2006, the second on March 31, 2007, the third on July 27, 2007, and the fourth and final one on December 29, 2007, along with the image album Return to Zero produced by ZIZZ Studio. Fate/Zero was then adapted into a four-volume drama CD, with the first release coming out on August 22, 2008, and the last on January 22, 2010. An anime adaptation produced by Ufotable for Fate/Zero, was approved production in December 2010, and aired from October 2011 to June 2012. The series was a success, with its first blu-ray box set selling 43,000 copies within its first week.

=== 2007–present: Other games ===
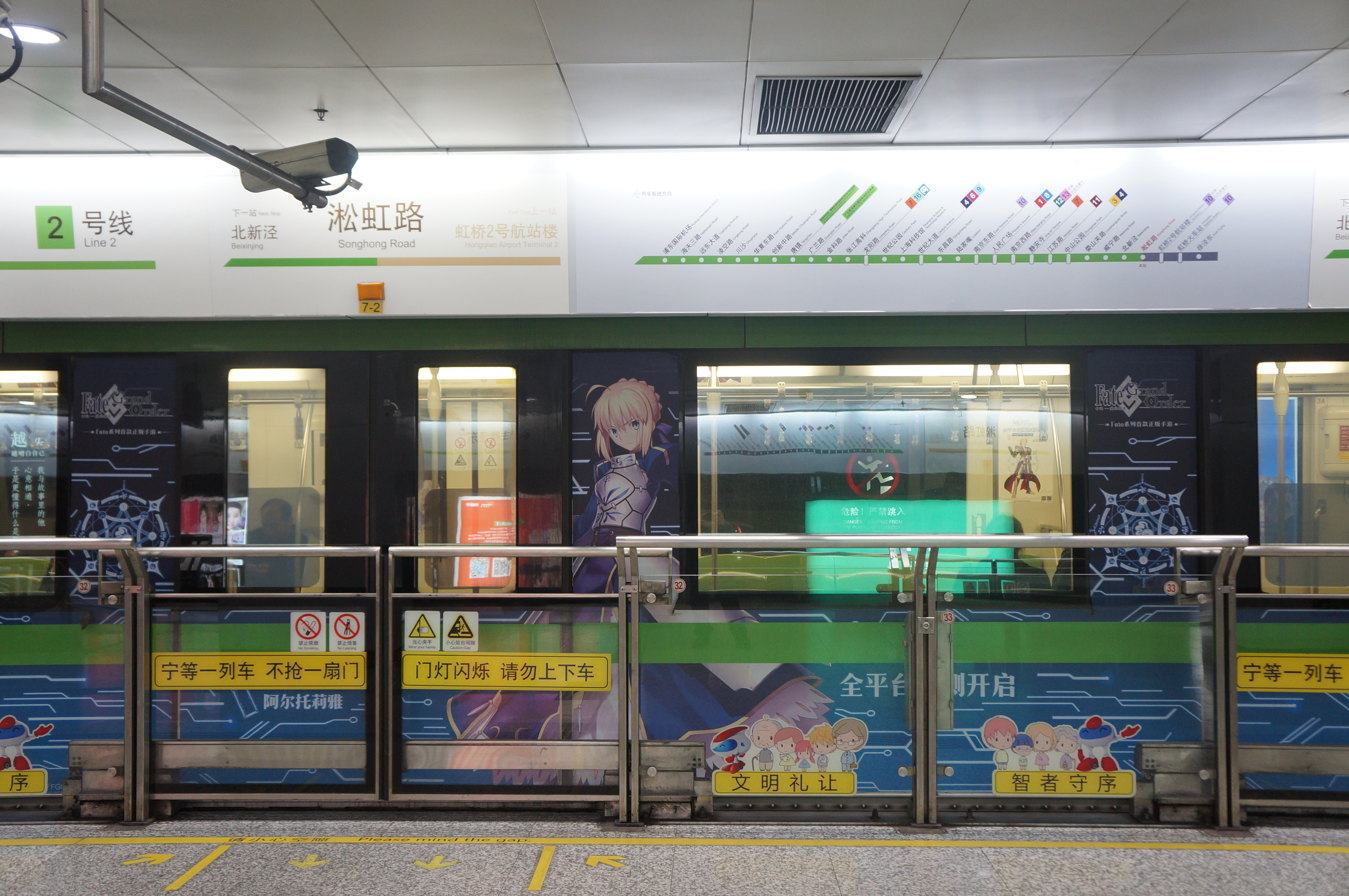
A coach with the Fate/Grand Order livery at Shanghai Metro Songhong Road Station

In 2007, Fate/tiger colosseum, a 3D fighting game based on Fate/Stay Night, was released for the PlayStation Portable by Capcom and Cavia in cooperation with TYPE MOON. The characters are all rendered in chibi-style. A sequel, Fate/tiger colosseum Upper, was released on August 28, 2008.

Another fighting game based on the franchise titled Fate/unlimited codes debuted at the 2008 Amusement Machine Operators' Union (AOU) show in Japan. It was developed by Capcom in conjunction with Cavia and Eighting. The game was released in the arcades and had an exclusive PlayStation 2 release on December 18, 2008. A pre-order version was also available, which includes a limited edition Saber Lily figure. Capcom also released a PlayStation Portable version titled Fate/unlimited codes Portable on June 18, 2009. A digital download of the game was released in North America on September 3, 2009, and in Europe on September 10, 2009.

A dungeon role-playing game (RPG) titled Fate/Extra was announced on Famitsu and is produced by Image Epoch and Marvelous Entertainment. Players take on the role of an unnamed male or female character that the player chooses to be one of seven chosen masters and control servants Saber, Archer, or Caster. The game was released for the PlayStation Portable in both regular and the "Type-Moon Box" editions. The limited, Type-Moon Box edition includes a Saber Figma figure from the game itself, a visual book and a limited edition soundtrack. While the original release was set for March 2010, the release date was pushed back to July 22, 2010, for further testing. In July 2011, Aksys Games confirmed it would be publishing Fate/Extra in North America. Saber appears as playable character in the Nitroplus fighting game Nitroplus Blasterz: Heroines Infinite Duel based on her appearance in Fate/Zero. An anime television series adaptation, titled Fate/Extra Last Encore and produced by Shaft, was announced for 2017.

An online free-to-play RPG titled Fate/Grand Order was first released on July 29, 2015, with a subsequent release on August 12 on iOS. It centered on a turn-based combat system where the player takes on the role of an unnamed male or female Master, summons and commands Servants in a battle against enemies. The story narrative is presented in a visual novel format, and each Servant has a scenario that the player explores. Many Servants are featured; some are original, while others return from preceding Fate works.

An action RPG, titled Fate/Samurai Remnant, was released on September 28, 2023, for Windows, Switch, PlayStation 4, and PlayStation 5.

== Music ==
The original soundtracks for both the anime adaptations and games are composed by Kenji Kawai. The soundtrack for the Fate/Stay Night visual novel was released in Japan by Geneon Entertainment in February 2004, while the original soundtrack for the Fate/Stay Night anime adaptation had contained various versions of the opening theme "This Illusion", performed by Sachi Tainaka and the ending theme "days". In November 2005, the soundtrack for Fate/Hollow Ataraxia was released. The opening and ending themes for the visual novel were "Broken Night / Hollow World" and "Open The Doors", both performed by Aimer. Eight image albums arranged by Number 201 and Kawai, were released between December 2006 and July 2007.

== Media ==
=== Manga ===
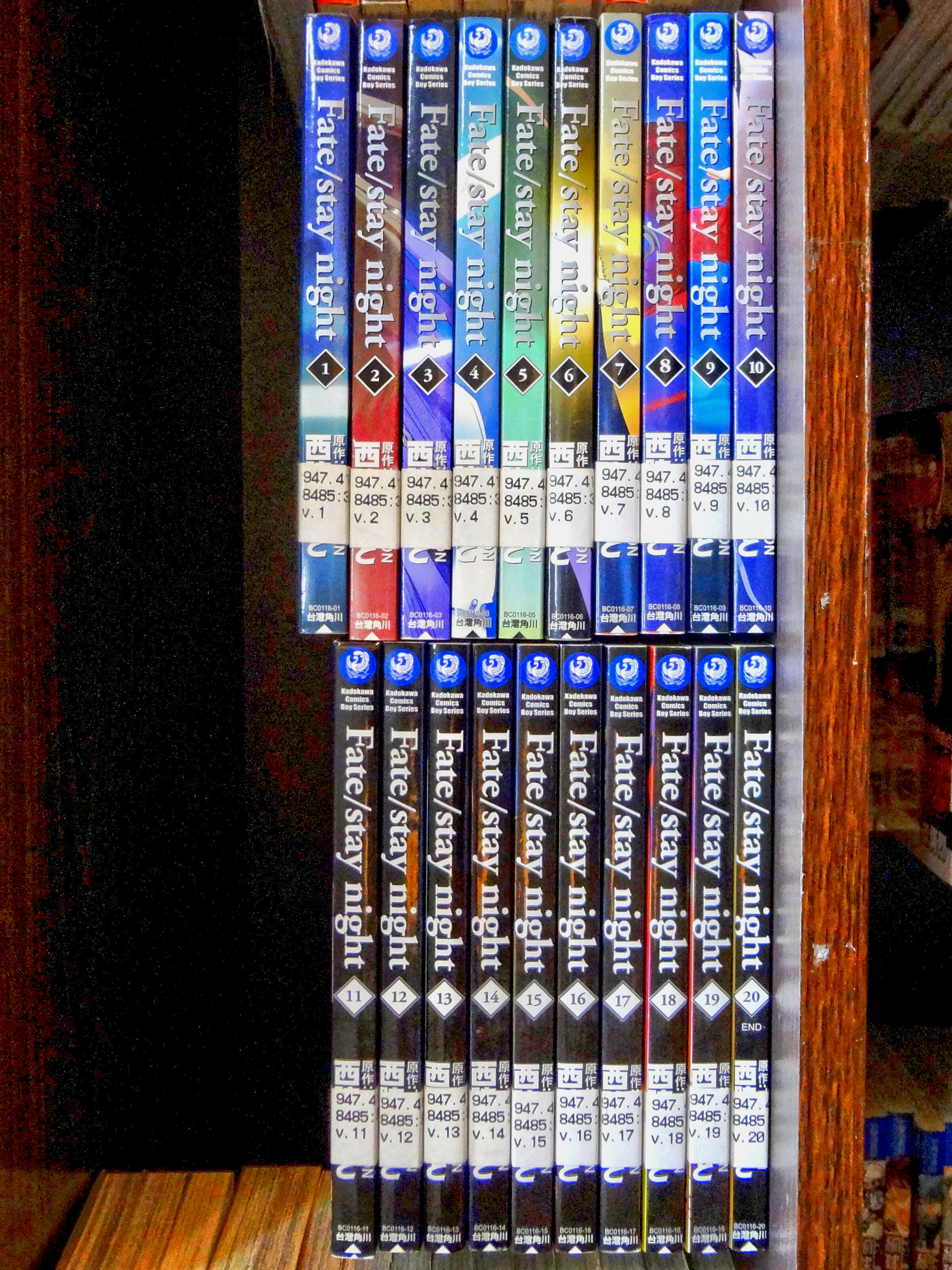
Collection of the first Fate/Stay Night manga volumes

The Fate/Stay Night manga adaptation, illustrated by Datto Nishiwaki, was serialized in Kadokawa Shoten's manga magazine Shōnen Ace between the February 2006 and December 2012 issues. Extras were also published in Ace Assault and Type-Moon Ace. The manga combines the Fate and Unlimited Blade Works scenarios of the visual novel and some elements from the Heaven's Feel scenario while ultimately following the Fate scenario. Twenty tankōbon volumes were released in Japan between May 26, 2006, and November 26, 2012. In 2007, the manga was licensed for an English-language release in North America by Tokyopop.

A spin-off manga series written by Hiroshi Hiroyama, titled Fate/kaleid liner Prisma Illya, would begin serialization in Kadokawa Shoten's Comp Ace magazine from September 2007. Set in an alternate universe to the visual novels, the series follows the character Illyasviel von Einzbern as she becomes a magical girl.

A manga adaptation of the Fate/Zero light novel written by Gen Urobuchi was serialized in Young Ace from 2010 to 2017. American publisher Dark Horse Comics had licensed the manga and published its third compiled volume in October 2014.

In April 2011, Tokyopop announced that they were shutting down their North American manga publishing division, and volume 11 became the last volume to be released by Tokyopop. In 2013, a Fate/Hollow Ataraxia manga illustrated by Medori and published by Kadokawa began serializing in the Monthly Shounen Ace magazine. Viz Media's Viz Select imprint had re-released the first ten volumes of the Fate/Stay Night manga digitally in 2014. A second Fate/Stay Night manga based entirely on the Heaven's Feel route and illustrated by Taskohna began serialization in the June 2015 issue of Kadokawa Shoten's Young Ace on May 2, 2015. A third manga adaptation based entirely on the Unlimited Blade Works route and illustrated by Daisuke Moriyama began serialization in the February 2022 issue of ASCII Media Works' Dengeki Daioh magazine on December 25, 2021.

Himuro no Tenchi Fate/School Life is a comedy 4-koma manga revolving around the everyday life at school of the minor characters of Fate/Stay Night and Fate/Hollow Ataraxia, specifically the character Kane Himuro, a classmate of Fate/Stay Night protagonist Shirō Emiya. It is serialized in Manga 4-koma Kings Palette from November 25, 2006, and fifteen compiled volumes have been published by Ichijinsha.

In January 2016, the Today's Menu for the Emiya Family manga series by TAa, had started serialization in Kadokawa Shoten's Young Ace Up website, and was collected in twelve tankōbon volumes as of May 2026. Set in an alternate universe where the Fifth Holy Grail War resolved with most of the characters surviving and later becoming friends and neighbors, it revolves around Shiro and other characters preparing various dishes for their friends and family. In December 2019, the Fate/type Redline manga series began publishing in Type-Moon's Comic Ace web magazine. The series follows a boy that was sent back in time to a Holy Grail War set in Japan during World War II.

=== Anime ===
Title	Premiere	Finale	Episodes
Fate/Stay Night	January 7, 2006	June 17, 2006	24
Fate/Stay Night: Unlimited Blade Works	January 23, 2010	N/A	Film
Fate/Stay Night: Unlimited Blade Works	October 4, 2014	June 27, 2015	26+1 OVA
Fate/Stay Night: Heaven's Feel I. Presage Flower	October 14, 2017	N/A	Film
Fate/Stay Night: Heaven's Feel II. Lost Butterfly	January 12, 2019	N/A	Film
Fate/Stay Night: Heaven's Feel III. Spring Song	August 15, 2020	N/A	Film

The original Fate/Stay Night anime series aired between January 7 and June 17, 2006, containing 24 episodes; the storyline follows mainly the Fate route but shows parts of other scenarios. When the anime adaptation was in the planning stages at Studio Deen, they planned an original story with Shielder, a heroine later used in Fate/Grand Order, instead of adapting the events of the source material. It was produced by the Fate Project, and included Geneon Entertainment, TBS, CREi, Type Moon, and Frontier Works. Kenji Kawai composed the original music for the series.

The series later received its international television premieres on the anime television network Animax in 2007, its English-language television premiere occurring on Animax's English networks in Southeast Asia in June, as well as its other networks in South Korea, Hong Kong and other regions. Geneon USA also licensed the series for distribution across North America. The English dub was produced at Bang Zoom! Entertainment. On July 3, 2008, Geneon Entertainment and Funimation Entertainment announced an agreement to distribute select titles in North America. While Geneon Entertainment retained the license, Funimation Entertainment assumed exclusive rights to the manufacturing, marketing, sales, and distribution of select titles. Fate/Stay Night was one of several titles involved in the deal. Sentai Filmworks has since licensed the TV series and re-released the series on DVD and for the first time on Blu-ray Disc in January 2013. Fate/Stay Night started airing in North America on the Anime Network On Demand channel on February 7, 2013.

The television series was re-released in Japan on January 22, 2010, in two 60-minute special edition DVD/Blu-ray volumes to commemorate the release of the film Fate/Stay Night: Unlimited Blade Works. Fate/Stay Night TV reproduction I and II each recap 12 episodes from the anime and feature re-edited and re-compiled footage along with new opening and ending animation footage, with new ending songs by Jyukai and Sachi Tainaka. The opening song "disillusion -2010-" is a re-recording of the "disillusion" theme song from the television series.

An animated film based on the storyline of the Unlimited Blade Works route from the visual novel was released in Japanese theaters on January 23, 2010, and produced by Studio Deen. The staff from the anime television series, including director Yūji Yamaguchi, returned to work on the film, with most of the voice cast reprising their roles. The film earned 280 million yen at the Japanese box office. Sentai Filmworks has licensed the Unlimited Blade Works film and released it on DVD and Blu-ray. As with the television series, the film was dubbed at Bang Zoom, was previewed on the Anime Network.

Following an anime adaptation of the Fate/Zero novel series, which aired between October 2011 and June 2012, Ufotable produced a second Fate/Stay Night anime television series based on the Unlimited Blade Works route from the visual novel. The anime was directed by Takahiro Miura and the original Japanese voice cast from the Studio Deen Fate/Stay Night anime and the Fate/Zero anime reprise their roles in the new anime. The first half of the anime ran from October 4 to December 27, 2014, and the second half ran from April 4 to June 27, 2015. An advanced online screening had premiered on September 28, 2014, in several countries across the world, including Japan, the United States, France, Germany, and South Korea. Aniplex of America has acquired streaming and home video rights to the 2014 series for North America, and has also announced an English dub of the first half of the series, which was released on DVD and limited Blu-ray on August 25, 2015. A 10-episode anime television series adaptation by Silver Link based on Fate/kaleid liner Prisma Illya manga series, was aired in Japan between July 13, 2013 and September 21, 2016.

A ten-minute original video animation (OVA) episode was featured on the Blu-ray release of the second half of the series, which was released on October 7, 2015; the episode was based on an alternate ending from the visual novel, titled "sunny day". Ufotable also released a film trilogy based on the Heaven's Feel route, the first of which is titled Fate/Stay Night: Heaven's Feel I. Presage Flower and was released in Japan on October 14, 2017, and in the United States in November and December 2017. The film was released again in the United States on June 5 and 7, 2018, with an English dub. The second film, titled Fate/Stay Night: Heaven's Feel II. Lost Butterfly was released in Japan on January 12, 2019. The third film, titled Fate/Stay Night: Heaven's Feel III. Spring Song was released in Japan on August 15, 2020. A thirteen-episode original net animation adaptation produced by Ufotable for Today's Menu for the Emiya Family aired monthly from January 25, 2018, to January 1, 2019.

=== Light novels ===
In November 2006, Type-Moon had announced Fate/Zero, a light novel that serves as a prequel to the events in Fate/Stay Night. It focuses on the events of the Fourth Holy Grail War and how its consequences affected the Fifth Holy Grail War. In contrast to Fate/Stay Night, Fate/Zero is a series of light novels, and is told in a third-person point of view that follows the actions of multiple characters. The series is a collaboration between Type-Moon and a fellow developer, Nitroplus, and was written by Gen Urobuchi. Alongside the release ot its fourth and final volume on December 29, 2007, an image soundtrack titled Fate/Zero Original Image Soundtrack "Return to Zero" was released. It was followed by an anime adaptation by Ufotable in 2011.

A light novel titled Fate/Apocrypha was also released. It revolves around a parallel universe in which the events of Fate/Stay Night and Fate/Zero never occurred due to the removal of the Holy Grail after the Third War, resulting in a different Holy Grail War. The first volume was released on December 29, 2012, and the fifth and final on December 30, 2014. An anime adaptation by A-1 Pictures aired from July to December 2017.

== Reception ==
=== Sales ===
Japanese and Western review scores As of 2023.
Game	Famitsu	Metacritic
Fate/Samurai Remnant	(PS5/PS4/Switch) 36/40	(PC) 82/100 (NS) 74/100 (PS5) 81/100
Fate/Unlimited Codes	(PS2) 28/40	(PSP) 72/100
Fate/Stay Night Remastered		(NS) 100/100 (PC) 89/100
Fate/Extra		(PSP) 58/100
Fate/Extella: The Umbral Star		(PS4) 67/100 (NS) 69/100

The series was a commercial success. Following its release, Fate/Stay Night was regarded as one of the most popular visual novels in history, earning the title of the "highest selling visual novel" in 2004 of the adult game retailer Getchu.com. The original PC version of Fate/Stay Night sold 400,000 copies. While on the PlayStation 2, the 2007 release sold 184,558, the 2009 re-release sold 21,937, and 58,157 in 2013 on the PlayStation Vita, which rose to 86,836 in 2014. Fate/Hollow Ataraxia would be regarded as one of the top selling visual novels of 2005. By July 2021, Fate/Grand Order had grossed a total of $5.6 billion worldwide, making it one of the highest-grossing mobile games of all time. As of March 2026, the Fate game series had sold millions of units worldwide and in Japan.

=== Critical response ===
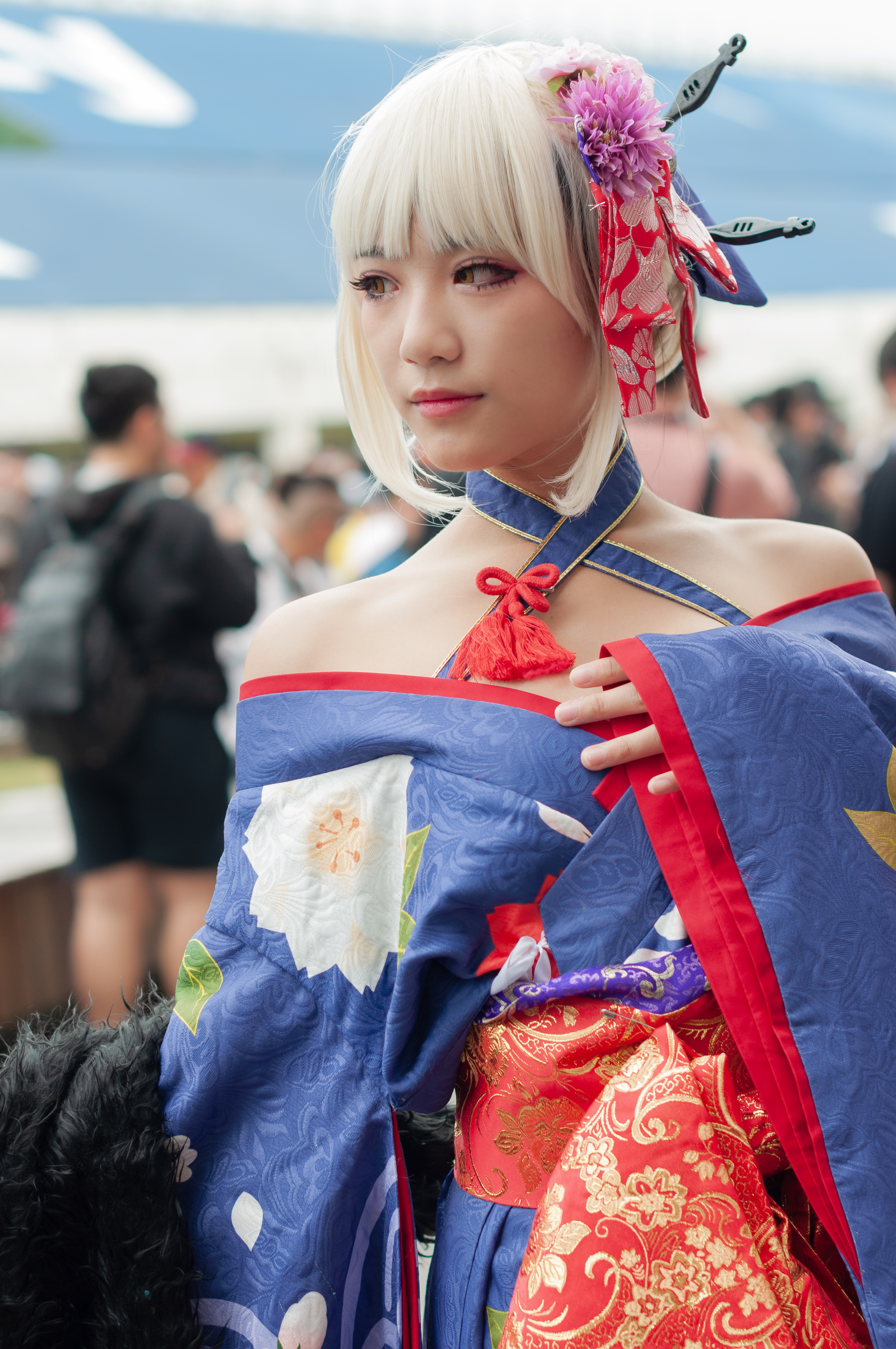
Cosplay of the series has been popular due to the distinct character depth and designs.

Andrew Bossche at Gamasutra had considered Shirou an "interesting" protagonist from his childish ideals of becoming a hero and continuing it while he grew up. He also mentioned that the player's in-game choices affect Shirou's character arcs "dramatically", and allow Nasu to showcase a different aspect of his ideal. While Skyler Allen of Crunchyroll wrote that "As large and complex as it all is, [Fate] has so much to offer." She praised the franchise's action, "memorable" characters, and its take on heroism. Allen also felt that Heaven's Feel wasn't as a good as a starting point because it had "skimmed" the early exposition that the Unlimited Blade Works route had covered. Anime News Network's Michael Toole wrote that Fate/Zero was a show that is "peppered with death-defying struggles", "epic betrayals", and "larger than life battles", which he felt made it one of the best anime television series. The series' cast was well received in general, with many of them often being the subject of cosplay based on their distinctive designs, with multiple favoriting Rin Tohsaka and the series' mascot Saber. Rice Digital's Pete Davison had claimed that the adult content was given a deep theme, particularly in Heaven's Feel, when Sakura Matou was treated differently due to her backstory.

=== Accolades ===
Fate/Zero won multiple top prizes during the 2nd Newtype Anime Awards, including Title of the Year, Best Studio (for ufotable), Best Soundtrack, and Best CM. Placed second for Best Theme Song ("to the beginning"), Best Director, Best Character Design and Script. For the Best Male Character category, Rider had placed first, while Kiritsugu and Gilgamesh placed third and eighth respectively. While, in the Best Character for Female category, Saber placed second. It has also received 2 nominations at the 2014 UK Anime Network Awards in the "Best Action" and "Best Dramatic Anime" categories. The light novel took sixth place in its respective category in the 2015 Sugoi Japan Awards.
