= Saber (Fate/Stay Night) =

Fictional character from the Fate series

Saber Artoria Pendragon
- Fate character
- Saber wielding Excalibur, as seen in Fate/Grand Order
- First game: Fate/stay night (2004)
- Created by: Kinoko Nasu
- Designed by: Takashi Takeuchi
- Voiced by: English: Kate Higgins (2006 anime series) Michelle Ruff (Fate/Stay night: Unlimited Blade Works film, Fate/Apocrypha) Kari Wahlgren (Fate/Zero, Ufotable's Unlimited Blade Works, Heaven's Feel films, Fate/Grand Order - Divine Realm of the Round Table: Camelot, Fate/Grand Carnival) Elise Moore (Fate/kaleid liner Prisma Illya); Japanese: Ayako Kawasumi

In-universe information
- Class: Saber

Artoria Pendragon (Japanese: アルトリア・ペンドラゴン, Hepburn: Arutoria Pendoragon) (alternatively, Altria), often known as Saber (セイバー, Seibā), is a fictional character from the Japanese 2004 visual novel Fate/Stay Night by Type-Moon. Saber is a heroic warrior who is summoned by a teenager named Shirou Emiya to participate in a war between masters and servants who are fighting to accomplish their dreams using the mythical Holy Grail. Saber's relationship with the story's other characters depends on the player's decisions; she becomes a love interest to Shirou in the novel's first route and also serves as that route's servant protagonist, a supporting character in the second, and a villain called "Saber Alter" (セイバー・オルタ, Seibā Oruta) in the third route.

Saber is an agile and mighty warrior who is loyal, independent, and reserved; she appears emotionally cold but is actually suppressing her emotions to focus on her goals. She is also present in the prequel light novel Fate/Zero, in which she is the servant of Shirou's guardian Kiritsugu Emiya during the previous Holy Grail War, and in the sequel Fate/hollow ataraxia. Saber also appears in the novel's printed and animated adaptations, reprising her role in the game.

Saber was created by Kinoko Nasu after the series' leading illustrator suggested having an armored woman as a protagonist for the visual novel; writer Gen Urobuchi commented on her character becoming darker depending on the situations. Urobuchi created his scenario involving Saber and Kiritsugu because their relationship was little explored in the original visual novel. Saber has been voiced by Ayako Kawasumi in her Japanese appearances, and multiple actresses took the role in English-language dubs of the series' animated adaptations.

Critical reception to Saber's character and role in Fate/Stay Night, and by extension her relationship with Shirou has been generally positive. On the other hand, her characterization and relationships with characters in the UBW route has been subject to controversy. While her portrayal in the first and third routes Stay Night was that of a deeply self-assured, pragmatic ruler, capable of putting aside her ideals for the greater good of her nation, as shown by her utilitarian decision-making in allowing certain settlements to starve in order to feed her vanguard and ultimately ensure the survival of Britain as a whole. However, in Fate/Zero, characters such as Gilgamesh ridicule her for her naivety and steadfast devotion to chivalry, and her master Kiritsugu is relegated the role of having to educate her about the realities of war, despite her status as a monarch who has seen, participated, and killed in war to a far greater extent than he, and is far more aware of its grim realities. On the whole, Saber has been popular within the Fate series and anime in general, with numerous alternative depictions in the franchise and in Fate/Grand Order.

== Character backstory ==
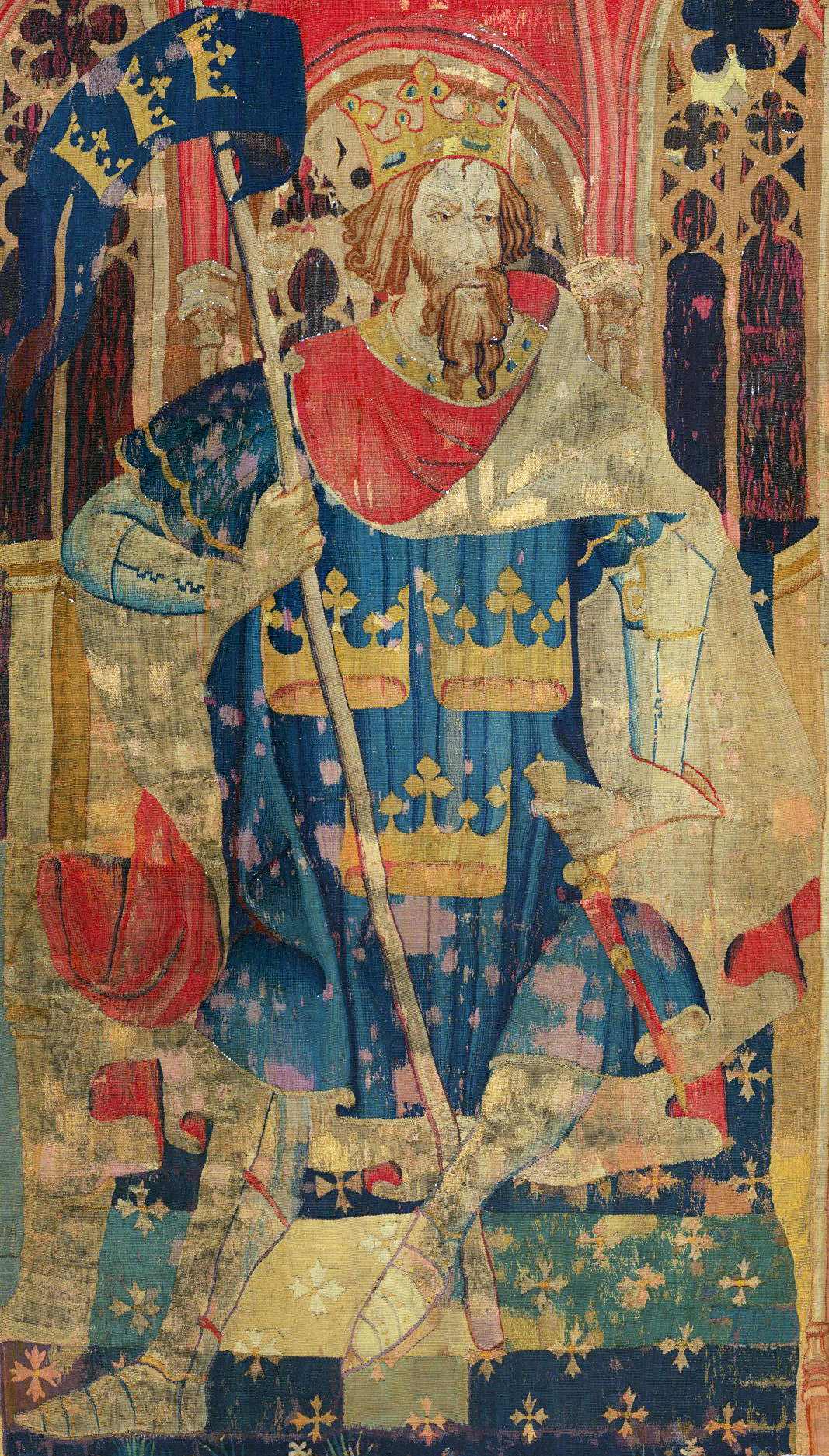
Saber is based on King Arthur, a legendary British leader who, according to medieval histories and romances, led the defence of Britain against Saxon invaders in the late 5th and early 6th centuries.

Saber's real name is Artoria Pendragon (sometimes written as Altria, Arthuria or Arturia). The character was inspired by the legends of King Arthur. At her birth, Uther decides to not publicly announce Artoria's birth or sex, fearing his subjects will never accept a woman as a legitimate ruler. Merlin entrusts Artoria to Sir Ector, a loyal knight who raises her as a surrogate son. When Artoria is fifteen, King Uther dies, leaving no known, eligible heir to the throne. Britain enters a period of turmoil following the growing threat of invasion by the Saxons. Merlin approaches Artoria, explaining that the British people will recognize her as a destined ruler if she draws Caliburn, a ceremonial sword, from the rock in which it is embedded. Pulling this sword, however, means accepting the hardships of a monarch; Artoria will be responsible for preserving the welfare of her people. Without hesitation and despite her sex, she draws Caliburn and becomes king of Britain. The only knights who know the truth of her gender are her foster brother, Sir Kay, and the king's secretary, Sir Agravain.

Artoria is plagued by feelings of guilt and inferiority throughout her reign; she sacrifices her emotions for the good of Britain, but many of her subjects and knights become critical of her lack of humanity and cold calculation. A traitorous knight mortally wounds Artoria, a homunculus named Mordred who is born of her blood during the Battle of Camlann. Morgan le Fay and Sir Bedivere escort the dying king to a holy isle; Artoria orders Bedivere to dispose of Excalibur by throwing it back to Vivian. In her absence, she reflects on her failures, regretting her life as king. Before taking her last breath, she appeals to the world; in exchange for her services as a Heroic Spirit, she asks to be allowed to relive her life, in which someone more suitable and effective would lead Britain in her stead.

== Appearances ==
=== In Fate/stay night ===
Saber Alter as seen in Heaven's Feel route. Due to her darker personality, she has been referred to as an anti-heroine by the developers.

In the visual novel Fate/stay night, Saber is accidentally summoned by a young mage named Shirou Emiya, stopping the servant Lancer in the process.

==== Fate route ====
In the Fate route of Fate/stay night, Shirou and Saber often clash because of their fighting methods. Despite this, Shirou tries to persuade Saber that the past cannot be changed and that trying to change it is unwise. Once Saber discovers the Holy Grail is corrupt and causes only death, she accepts that her wish is indeed impossible to accomplish. She later works with Shirou to save the world she was summoned into.

Saber and Shirou develop romantic feelings for one another but decide to end their relationship once the Holy Grail War is finished. Having realized Kiritsugu Emiya sealed Excalibur's scabbard, Avalon: The Everdistant Utopia (全て遠き理想郷(アヴァロン), Avaron), inside his body, Shirou passes it to his Servant so that she could defeat the Servant Gilgamesh. Saber and Shirou win their respective fights against Gilgamesh and his master Kirei Kotomine. Saber destroys the Holy Grail with Excalibur and, after accepting Shirou's feelings and confessing her own, is sent back to her original time and dies. In the PlayStation 2 remake, an extra ending in which Shirou and Saber reunite following their deaths was added. After accepting her own identity and dying, Saber forgoes becoming a Heroic Spirit so she can wait for Shirou in Avalon, the mystical land where only true heroes may reside. After waiting for many lifetimes for Shirou to earn the right to ascend to Avalon, they are finally reunited for eternity.

==== Unlimited Blade Works route ====
In the Unlimited Blade Works route of Fate/stay night, Saber is stabbed by Caster's Rule Breaker and is forced to become her Servant. Caster then forces Saber to kill Shirou and Rin Tohsaka, but Saber resists the spell, giving Rin and Shirou time to escape. After Archer kills Caster, Rin then forges a contract with her, becoming her new Master. Saber, Shirou and Rin remain conflicted in how to deal with Gilgamesh. Eventually, they decide that Shirou should fight their enemy as he possesses the same powers as the missing Archer while Saber and Rin go to stop the Holy Grail, facing the Servant Assassin in the process. After defeating Assassin, Saber destroys the Holy Grail with Excalibur, and Shirou manages to defeat Gilgamesh with the reappeared Archer's help. In the Good End of this scenario, Saber lives on as one of Rin's familiars along with Shirou. In the True End, she disappears after destroying the Holy Grail. Saber's role is that of a typical servant and protector in this route.

==== Heaven's Feel route ====
In Heaven's Feel route of Fate/stay night, Saber is consumed by the Holy Grail during a battle with True Assassin and becomes a stronger, corrupted version of her former self, known as Saber Alter, and a Servant under Sakura Matou, the heroine of this route. While Shirou is on his way to seek an alliance with Ilya and Berserker, Saber appears in her Alter form and defeats Berserker, making herself known to Shirou while nearly killing her former allies. Shirou returns to Illya's home and defeats Berserker, who is now working for Sakura. Saber approaches the weakened Shirou but refuses to kill him since she feels honored by his recent fight. In the Normal End and True End, Sakura orders Saber to kill Shirou and the servant Rider. However, the duo manages to overpower Saber, with Shirou killing his former comrade. Saber's role is that of fallen friend who was turned evil and thus killed by her former master and companion ally in this route.

=== In Fate/hollow ataraxia ===
In the sequel video game Fate/hollow ataraxia, Saber continues to protect Shirou; if the player chooses, Shirou can pursue Saber romantically once more. She kills Archer when he attacks Shirou in one loop. In another loop, Saber is killed by Bazett Fraga McRemitz's Fragrach when she tries to use Excalibur on her. In the final loop of Fate/hollow ataraxia, Saber aids Shirou/Avenger to reach the Grail by fending off mysterious monsters with other Heroic Spirits. When the stray hair on Saber's head is pulled, she reverts to her Alter form. Saber Alter is portrayed as crude and obsessed with fast food in direct opposition to Saber's love of Shirou's cooking.

=== Fate/Zero ===
In the prequel light novel series Fate/Zero, Kiritsugu Emiya summons Saber to participate in the 4th Holy Grail War. To prepare for the war, Kiritsugu persuades his wife Irisviel von Einzbern to act as Saber's guide while he aids her in secret. As in the original visual novel, Saber wishes to obtain the Holy Grail to change her kingdom's past, which results in Gilgamesh and Alexander the Great mocking her ideals. During a fight against Lancer, Kiritsugu ignores knightly ideals and forces Lancer's Master to commit suicide, angering Saber. Shortly afterwards, Kirei Kotomine kidnaps Irisviel, and Saber goes to find her. On the way, Saber confronts Berserker, who is revealed to be her former ally, Lancelot. After Lancelot's death, Saber is ordered to destroy the Holy Grail by her then-master, Kiritsugu, using two back-to-back Command Seals. Still, she only succeeds in destroying its physical form. Saber returns to her world, still aiming to take the Holy Grail for her people.

=== Fate/Grand Order ===
Artoria Pendragon appears in Fate/Grand Order as a recurring Servant. She is one of the Servants of Ritsuka Fujimaru of the Grand Order conflicts of Fate/Grand Order. She appears as Saber, along with her multiple forms Saber Alter and Saber Lily, as well as her newer forms Lancer and Lancer Alter, and gag forms as Archer, Rider Alter and Ruler form wearing a swimsuit, maid outfit and bunny girl costume respectively, as well as another rider form as "Santa Alter" introduced in the game and a Caster form introduced for the game's 5th anniversary. Her other gag iterations are the Assassin-class Mysterious Heroine X, Berserker-class Mysterious Heroine X Alter, and Foreigner-classes Mysterious Heroine XX and XX Alter; all four are stated to be Artorias who originate from a technically-advanced alternate timeline called the "Servantverse", so named due to Servants being the dominant lifeform there.

In the main story, Saber Alter appears in the Fuyuki chapter as the main antagonist, Lancer Alter appears in the London chapter, and Lancer in the form of "Lion King/Goddess Rhongomyniad" served as the central villain of Camelot chapter. Heroine X appeared in the Grand Time Temple chapter as one of "event and gag Servants" while its Caster form served as the central character in the "Avalon la Fae" chapter.

=== Other appearances ===
Saber appears in the anime and manga versions of Fate/stay night, and the film Unlimited Blade Works. Three of versions of Saber—regular, Saber Alter, and Saber Lily—appear in the fighting game Fate/unlimited codes. The Lily form is based on Saber's alternative outfit from Unlimited Blade Works, which development staff noted was well received by fans. A Lion form of Saber also appeared in Fate/tiger colosseum. Saber, along with other characters from Tsukihime, Melty Blood, and the other characters of Fate/stay night, appears in the 2011 anime Carnival Phantasm. Saber also appears in the series Fate/Labyrinth as Manaka's servant during the Subcategory Holy Grail. Together, they defeat many opponents and the bosses of each of the floor levels in Caubac Alcatraz's labyrinth.

She also appears in Fate/Extella as a secret playable character, and returns it its sequel, Link. Saber is also present in the manga and anime adaptations Today's Menu for the Emiya Family, in which she is living with Shirou, who teaches her to cook. Outside Type-Moon's works and adaptations, Saber appears in the video games Divine Gate and Nitroplus Blasterz: Heroines Infinite Duel. To promote the animated adaptations of the routes, Saber was added to the video games Summons Board, Puzzle & Dragons, and The Alchemist Code. She is also present in Phantasy Star Online 2 and Hortensia Saga. Two videogame adaptations for smartphones, Fate/Zero The Adventure and Fate/Zero Next Encounter, feature Saber.

Saber is a playable guest character in a fighting game Melty Blood: Type Lumina, a prequel to both Tsukihime -a piece of blue glass moon- and original timeline Melty Blood games, taking place in a remake timeline. Following the playable inclusion of Tsukihime’s Neco Spirit mascot, Neco-Arc, Saber’s inclusion in this game revealed to be the cause of the latter, when the Neco-Spirit inexplicably managed to use her smartphone's Fate/Grand Order app to do so. It also reveals that summoning servants like Saber in Tsukihime world (currently Remake version) should have been impossible, and even the Dead Apostle Michael Roa Valdamjong knows the risk on doing so and had since developed a distaste of learning its ritual, until Neco-Arc’s presence and the Fate/Grand Order app she brought in that world causes it to be possible.

Saber also appears in Honkai: Star Rail as a limited 5-star Wind character following the Path of Destruction, alongside the special event “Sweet Dreams and the Holy Grail”.

== Creation and conception ==
Early sketches of Saber when the character was male. The design had eventually become a separate character named Arthur Pendragon, which was included in Fate/Prototype (voiced by Takahiro Sakurai).

Before Kinoko Nasu started writing Fate/stay night, he wrote the Fate route for fun in his spare time when he was a student. Shirou and Saber's sexes were swapped, due to Type-Moon's previous experience with Tsukihime. The company believed that this would fit the modern demographic. However, Takeuchi had the idea of drawing an armored woman, which resulted in Saber becoming female. Takeuchi regarded Saber as one of his favorite Servants in the series and an ideal bride to the point of drawing her whenever he has free time. The relationship between Shirou and Saber was intended to be different from previous fictional romances, not being fueled by instinct alone, but also by logic. As a foreshadowing of Shirou and Saber's first meeting, the team included a dream sequence in which Shirou sees the mythical sword Excalibur, which the latter wields. Because Shirou possessed the scabbard Avalon from Excalibur, Nasu wrote this to explain how the two become Master and Servant. Although Saber does not have the same character in "Unlimited Blade Works" than in "Fate" where she dropped her desires for the Holy Grail, Nasu still wanted Saber to have a similar resolution in regards to what to do in the war once confronting the Grail, leading to its destructions at her hands.

Nasu originally had an idea to extend the Fate route by involving an alternative Fifth Holy Grail War in which Shirou fights alongside Saber, but they do not have a romantic relationship. Following their separation, Shirou would bond with Rin Tohsaka, but still end up becoming the counter guardian EMIYA. During making the video game's anime adaptation, Nasu said the staff intended to make her more beautiful than the heroine Rin in the previous Fate series.

Initially, Nasu said it is difficult to call Shirou's relationship with Saber a relationship between a man and a woman because after ruling Britain under the pretenses of being a male, she "turned into a girl all of a sudden and fell in love with Shirou". While, Takeuchi on the other hand stated that the relationship is still workable and even realistic as it is part of Saber regaining a part of her humanity that had long been suppressed and grow as a character, which in turn becomes integral to part of Shirou's own growth in understanding both the flaws in Saber's and his own ideals.

Regarding Saber's alternate designs, Gen Urobuchi referred to Alter as a dark hero rather than a villain. Nasu further commented on Alter, stating she "is an idealist who clings to her own values even though she's been blackened". On the other hand, her becoming a Servant from Caster during Unlimited Blade Works was believed by Urobuchi to take a darker role than Saber Alter due to how she has been defeated in combat with Nasu speculating how her new dress symbolizes her defeat. Takeuchi enjoyed illustrating her due to the impact it left on the character. He added he enjoyed minor changes due to her design, such as her visor and her alternative dresses featured in related works to Fate. Saber Lily's character was created by Takeuchi, as an alternative costume for Saber, based on the visual novel's Unlimited Blade Works story arcade dress, and got its name because of the similarity of color and shape of the dress to the white lily. After the release of the Unlimited codes on the arcade machines, Saber Lily received a lot of positive feedback from fans and, unlike the game costumes of other characters, when porting the game to the PlayStation 2, she had her own name displayed in the match interface. Originally it was planned to include the character only in a limited edition of the game, but later it was added to the standard version.

During the making of Fate/Zero, writer Urobuchi had multiple ideas, including Saber being lectured by Gilgamesh and Alexander, which motivated Nasu to write the light novel series. As in the original Fate/stay night, Saber states she did not know her former master Kiritsugu Emiya properly. Urobuchi created Kiritsugu's wife Irisviel von Einzbern to facilitate communication between Saber and Kiritsugu. The staff worried Urobuchi would handle Kiritsugu's relationship with Saber because more unforgivable actions by the servant would have made it impossible for her to trust his adoptive son Shirou in the sequel. As a result, Urobuchi had to alter some of his original ideas. Urobuchi stated that in his works, the characters who survive the plot's events become "pillars". While Saber, Kiritsugu, and Kirei Kotomine are the major survivors, Kiritsugu dies offscreen. Because Saber does not have a large role in Fate/Zero, the pillar character is instead Kirei. For the first Heaven's Feel movie, there is a scene where Saber battles in the snow in front of the Ryuudou Temple which Ufotable noted as one of the big steps in animation due to its quality.

Saber's real name is often written inconsistently. While Artoria Pendragon is the most-used spelling, Nasu has also used Altria Pendragon. As a result, the localization members of the video game Fate/Grand Order have found it challenging to properly write her true name in the game whenever it is needed. The translators working for the game stated they enjoyed Saber Alter's interactions with Jeanne Alter based on how the story develops across them.

=== Voice actors ===
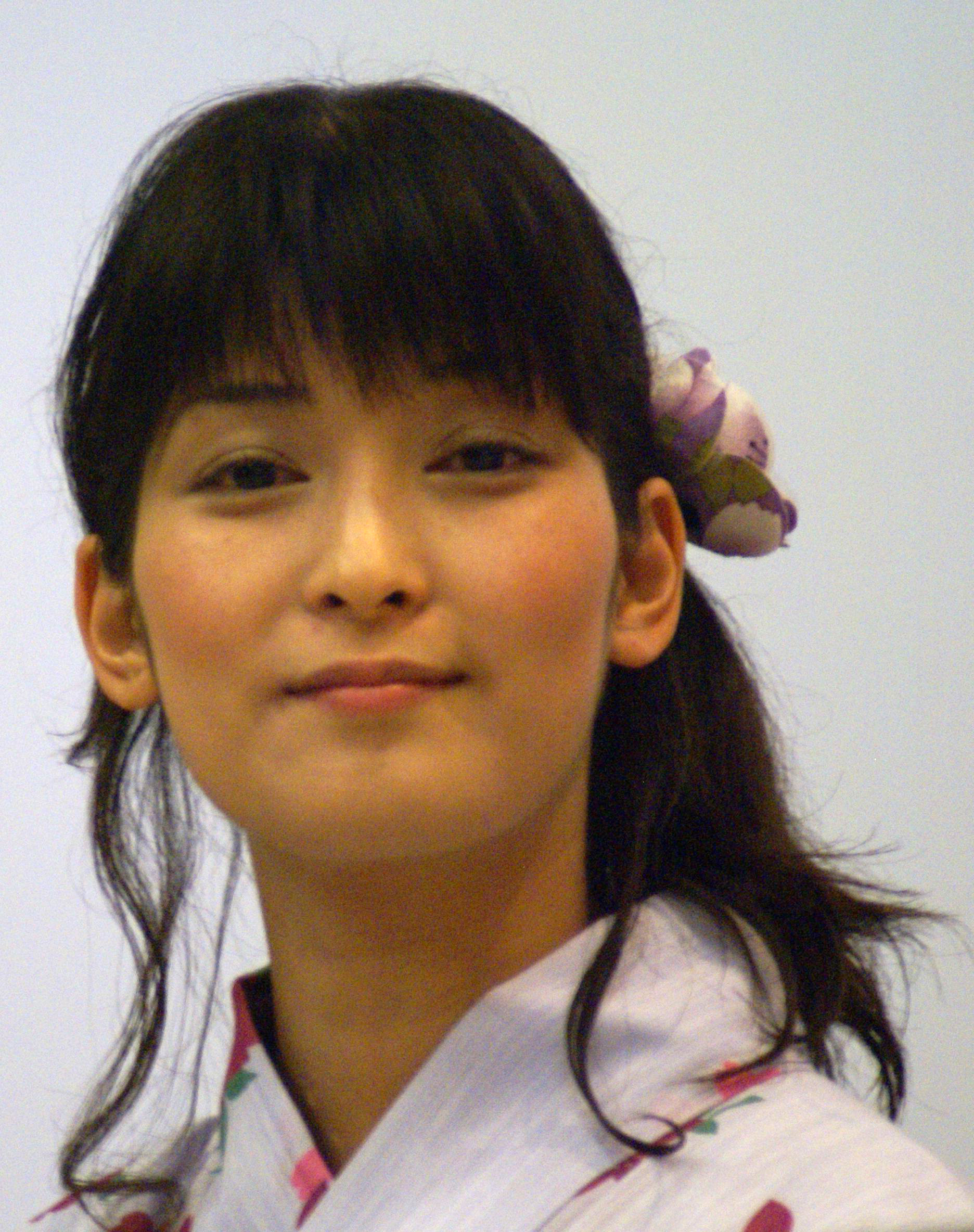
Ayako Kawasumi has voiced Saber in Japanese.

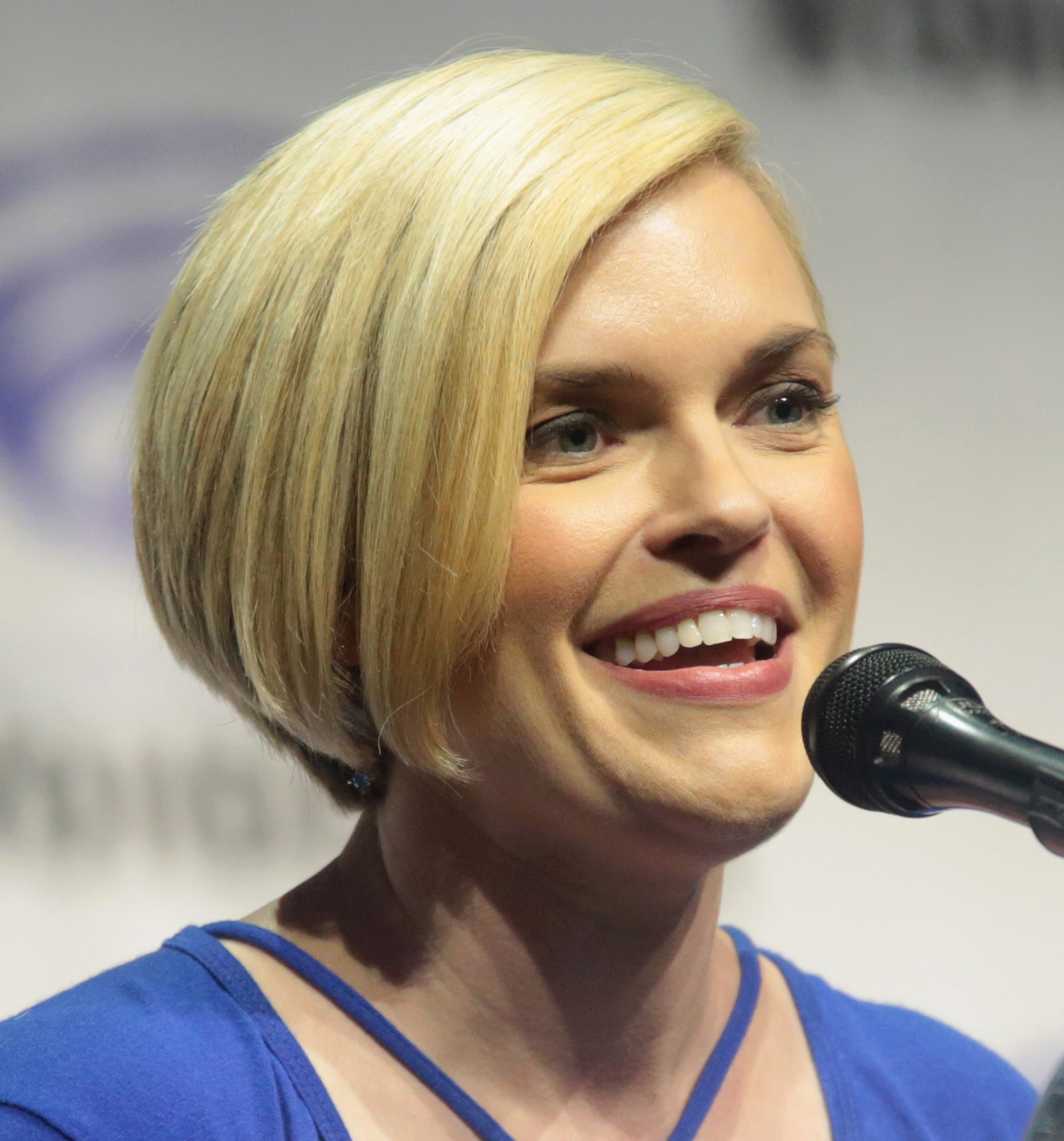
Kari Wahlgren has voiced Saber in English.

Saber is voiced by Ayako Kawasumi in Japanese; Nasu and Takeuchi chose her because they found her voice fitting for Saber's personality. The sound director suggested Kawasumi during the making of the series. Kawasumi said despite the multiple appearances she has in the Fate/stay night series, her characterization did not change due to her convictions. Kawasumi noted that Saber was drawn by Irisviel due to her love for her family. Still, because Saber did not accept Kiritsugu's principles, Kawasumi was regretful of this area about her character. While originally more popular for voicing Fuu in the anime Samurai Champloo, Kawasumi noted her work as Saber impressed fans due to the actress often seeing cosplayers of her new character. Furthermore, Kawasumi's role was noted to give her a good career. She noted she received multiple requests to voice female characters with strong personalities ever since her debut as Saber. Kawasumi remarks having fun in the making of Saber as across the recording of the series and visual novel, she met famous veteran actors with a spin-off giving her an alternate comical version of her character.

Kawasumi noted that Saber's characterization in Unlimited Blade Works differs from the previous ones because of her lack of romantic feelings for Shirou; instead, Saber acts less emotionally, seeing Shirou as her Master. When asked about the heroines in the Fate franchise, Kawasumi said Saber represents the strong female character type Type-Moon has created. Kawasumi believes that while Saber commonly acts with the idea of protecting other people, her appeal causes other characters to want to protect her. Regarding Fate/Zero, Kawasumi noted that while people saw this version of Saber as a more masculine woman than in the previous series, she kept her strong sense of self, which would make her more recognizable fans. For the second Heaven's Feel film, Kawasumi expressed mixed thoughts about Saber's darker characterization but still wanted viewers to see her in action.

Saber's English-language voice is provided by American voice actor Kari Wahlgren, who said that when voicing the character, she became interested in knowing the character's future actions because of the story's major plot twists. Because Saber is based on King Arthur, Wahlgren said she had no major problems doing the work because she had previously worked on William Shakespeare's plays. Comparing Saber to a Shakespearean character, Wahlgren said, "There's a little bit of Hamlet in there definitely, and a little bit of The Scottish Play [Macbeth]—I won't say it. Henry V. All the great leaders and warlords."

== Reception ==
=== Popularity ===
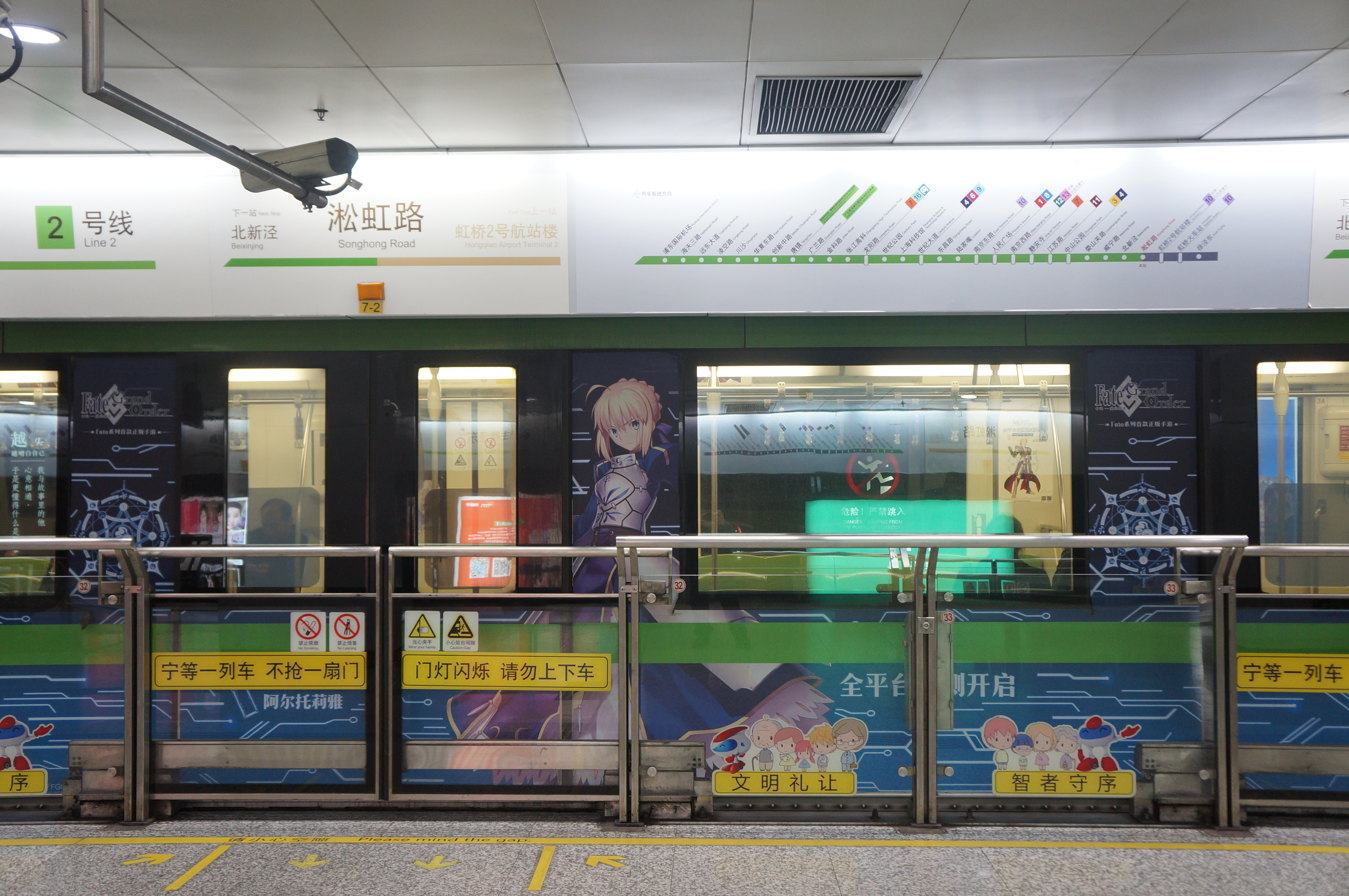
Saber has been popular within marketing of the Fate franchise.

In the Type-Moon Fes. 10th Anniversary Event, Saber was ranked the most popular character created by Type-Moon. In 2012, Niconico News ran a poll asking people which characters from Fate/Zero they wanted as boyfriends or girlfriends. Saber was the most popular character on the girlfriend list, polling 34.1%. She took fourth place in an Unlimited Blade Works poll. In 2011 Manga artist group Clamp drew their own version of Saber to celebrate the premiere of Fate/Zero. Saber was voted the top female Fate/Zero character whom men would like to date. To promote Fate/Grand Order, artist Yoshitaka Amano drew Saber in the Japanese convention AnimeJapan in March 2019. In a 2018 Manga.Tokyo poll, Saber was voted the most popular Fate character. A Charapedia poll asked fans to list their favorite "cool" women in anime; Saber placed fourth with 498 votes.

In a Newtype poll, Saber was the second-most popular female character from September 2017. In a list of top-30 characters of the 2010s in the same magazine, Saber was the most popular female character. In 2017, a cafe using Fate based characters including Saber was released in Osaka, Japan. She was also voted as the best servant from Fate/Zero during 2012. Japanese figure maker Good Smile Company ran a poll that asked fans which figures they most wanted; Saber's regular look and her Lily form from Unlimited Codes appeared in the figure category. She was also voted as the best servant from Fate/Zero during 2012.

Numerous figures of all versions of Saber and a keychain replica of her sword have been created. Another replica includes her motorcycle from Fate/Zero.

=== Critical response ===
Critical reception to Saber has generally been positive. Carl Kimlinger, writing for Anime News Network, praised the character, saying "Saber alone is worth the price of admission" when watching the series, and also commented on her fight scenes. He added, "the results are positively exhilarating, cementing Saber's status as one of the coolest heroines to come down the anime turnpike in quite some time". Kimlinger further referred to Saber and Archer as "the only spices" of the series. Mania Entertainment's Chris Beveridge liked the development of Saber during the series, particularly her team-ups with Shirou. He made similar comments about the romantic relationship between Saber and Shirou, with other writers such as DVDTalk and IGN finding them as the most appealing relationship within not just the series and franchise, but in all gaming and anime.

Saber's role in Fate/Zero is also positively received. ANN praised the tragedy that happened to Saber and Kiritsugu in the prequel Fate/Zero despite wishing for solutions to world issues, making the series worth watching. The writer also noted that Saber and Kiritsugu are opposites due to their backgrounds but still have similarities. Anime News Network's Carlo Santos praised Saber's fight against Lancer in Fate/Zero, calling it "one dazzling special effect after another—and it gets even better when other Servants enter the fray and show off their unique powers". Kotaku's reviewer enjoyed the way Saber, Gilgamesh and Alexander the Great discuss their ideals as kings and how their people should be treated, giving each character different philosophies. Aiden Foote of THEM Anime Reviews said the relationships between the characters, including that between Rider, Saber, and Archer, are personal highlights of the series. The Fandom Post's Chris Beveridge praised the fight between Saber and Berserker as well as her painful history and tragedy, and said that Saber "getting a glimmer of the future definitely hits all the right sweet spots." On the other hand, Uk Anime Network said that Saber feels like the Servant who lacked a character arc because she is mocked by her rivals for her beliefs and her relationship with Kiritsugu, showing more conflict within her. To which many fans and other critics argued back, pointing out how Unlimited Blade Works threated Saber worst in comparison to Fate/Zero and even the other routes of stay night.

Feedback to Saber's role in the anime Unlimited Blade Works have received negative responses; several critics have expressed anger on how wasted her character was. Dee Hogan from The Mary Sue stated that Saber was sidelined in favour of Rin and that she "deserve much better". According to UK Anime Network, Rin and Shirou were less interesting as a couple in the anime Unlimited Blade Works in comparison to Saber and Shirou in Studio Deen's anime adaptation of Fate/stay night; stating that Rin Tohsaka and Archer felt more entertaining and interesting. Gabriella Ekens of Anime News Network criticized the lack of focus on Saber's character, saying "it's a shame" especially when Saber is considered the mascot of the Fate franchise. Urobuchi said Saber's relationship with Shirou does not seem like a realistic relationship fueled by instinct like the relationship between a man and a woman, but a romance of logic between two people who need each other. He added that the Fate route could have been told through the Ancient Greek views on love. In contrast, both Nasu and Takeuchi however state that Shirou and Saber is more appealing and still functions as realistic even if it is the relationship between two soulmates. Michelle Ruff's English performance as Saber has led to negative criticism for leading an unfitting tone as the character in comparison to Kate Higgins; Anime News Network criticized her lack of dialogues in the Unlimited Blade Works movie.

In the first Heaven's Feel film, Fandom Post said Saber's importance is reduced because her relationship with Shirou "does not develop in an engaging way" in the movie. Although, Chris Beveridge stated he enjoyed multiple interactions between Sakura and Shirou and at the same time with Saber. Her transformation into Alter and her fight in the second Heaven's Film earned praise from Fandom Post, which called it one of the biggest highlights of the sequel.

Saber's charming side in Today's Menu for the Emiya Family was well received.

== Legacy and Impact ==
Character Nero (also known as Red Saber) from 2010 game Fate/Extra was purposefully designed to visually resemble Saber. Many other characters in the Fate franchise, particularly Saber-class, bear resemblance to Saber, leading to them being called "Saberfaces".

Saber/Artoria Pendragon has also inspired the creation of numerous heroines and main love interests across other franchises—particularly stoic, honorable, loving, lovely and affectionate young female knights, warriors, and soldiers who share her appearance and personality. Notable examples include Sylvia van Hossen from Princess Lover!, Centorea "Cerea" Shianus from Monster Musume, Alice Zuberg from Sword Art Online: Alicization, Ingrid Brandl Galatea from Fire Emblem: Three Houses, Violet Evergarden the titular protagonist of Violet Evergarden, Roxy Hart from Berserk of Gluttony and Nova from Parasite Mutant.
