= Nero (Fate) =

Fictional character in Fate

Nero Claudius
- Fate character
- Artwork of Nero from Fate/Extra
- First game: Fate/Extra (2010)
- Created by: Kinoko Nasu
- Designed by: Arco Wada
- Voiced by: EN: Cassandra Morris; JA: Sakura Tange

In-universe information
- Alias: Red Saber
- Class: Saber; Caster (Summer, Fate/Grand Order)

Nero Claudius (Japanese: ネロ・クラウディウス, Hepburn: Nero Kuraudiusu), also known as Red Saber (赤セイバー, Aka Seibā) or Saber Extra, is a character in the Fate franchise created by Type-Moon who debuted in the 2010 video game Fate/Extra and gained further popularity through her continuing appearances in the ongoing Fate/Grand Order game. She is based on the Roman emperor Nero Claudius Caesar Augustus Germanicus, reimagined as a female character and portrayed as a flamboyant, egotistical, yet deeply affectionate young woman. Visually, she was designed by illustrator Arco Wada. In most of her appearances, the character is a Servant participating in Holy Grail Wars or similar struggles, fighting against other Servants with their respective masters.

Despite her similar looks to the first Saber servant created by Type-Moon, writer Kinoko Nasu wrote Nero to stand out with her personality. The character is voiced by Cassandra Morris in English and Sakura Tange in Japanese. Critical response to Nero was positive for her sex appeal and personality, while scholars found her to be a significant example of the Fate franchise's practice of reimagining historical figures.

== Appearances ==
Nero first appeared in the 2010 video game Fate/Extra, where she was one of the main characters. She has since appeared in other games such as Fate/Extra CCC (2013), Fate/Extella: The Umbral Star (2016), Fate/Extella Link (2018), as well as the ongoing Fate/Grand Order (2015–present). Fate/Extra also received an anime adaptation Fate/Extra Last Encore in 2018, with Nero being one of its key characters. She was also expected to appear in Fate/Extra Record, but that title has been described as indefinietly delayed in 2026.

In the Fate universe, the principal difference between Nero known from normal history (the Fifth Emperor of Rome who reigned 54–68 AD) is that Fate's Nero portrayed as a woman despite historical records indicating a male emperor. Her backstory otherwise mostly draws from historical accounts of Nero's life, including her ascension through her mother Agrippina's schemes, her popularity with the Roman populace through lavish policies and public performances, and her eventual downfall amid rebellions, but it is reframed to portray her as a positive and tragic character that the players can symphatise with. In the Fate/Extra continuity, Nero, a Saber-class servant, is a Servant of Hakuno Kishinami, who participates in the Moon Holy Grail War, a tournament where Masters and their Servants battle for the Holy Grail. Fate/Extella is a sequel set after a victorious Moon Holy Grail War, where Hakuno and Nero have to face a new threat, an invasion by the Umbral Star, leading to a large-scale war.

In the Fate/Grand Order continuity, in the "Eternal Madness Empire: Septem" singularity (set in 60 AD), the protagonist and Mash Kyrielight arrive in ancient Rome during Nero's reign. They ally with the living Nero against invading forces led by her tyrannical predecessors revived as Servants, aiming to restore the proper human history. Nero has three summonable variants (Bride, Caster and Beast forms), several dedicated side-stories (interludes), and also features prominently in events such as "Nero Fests".

== Conception and design ==
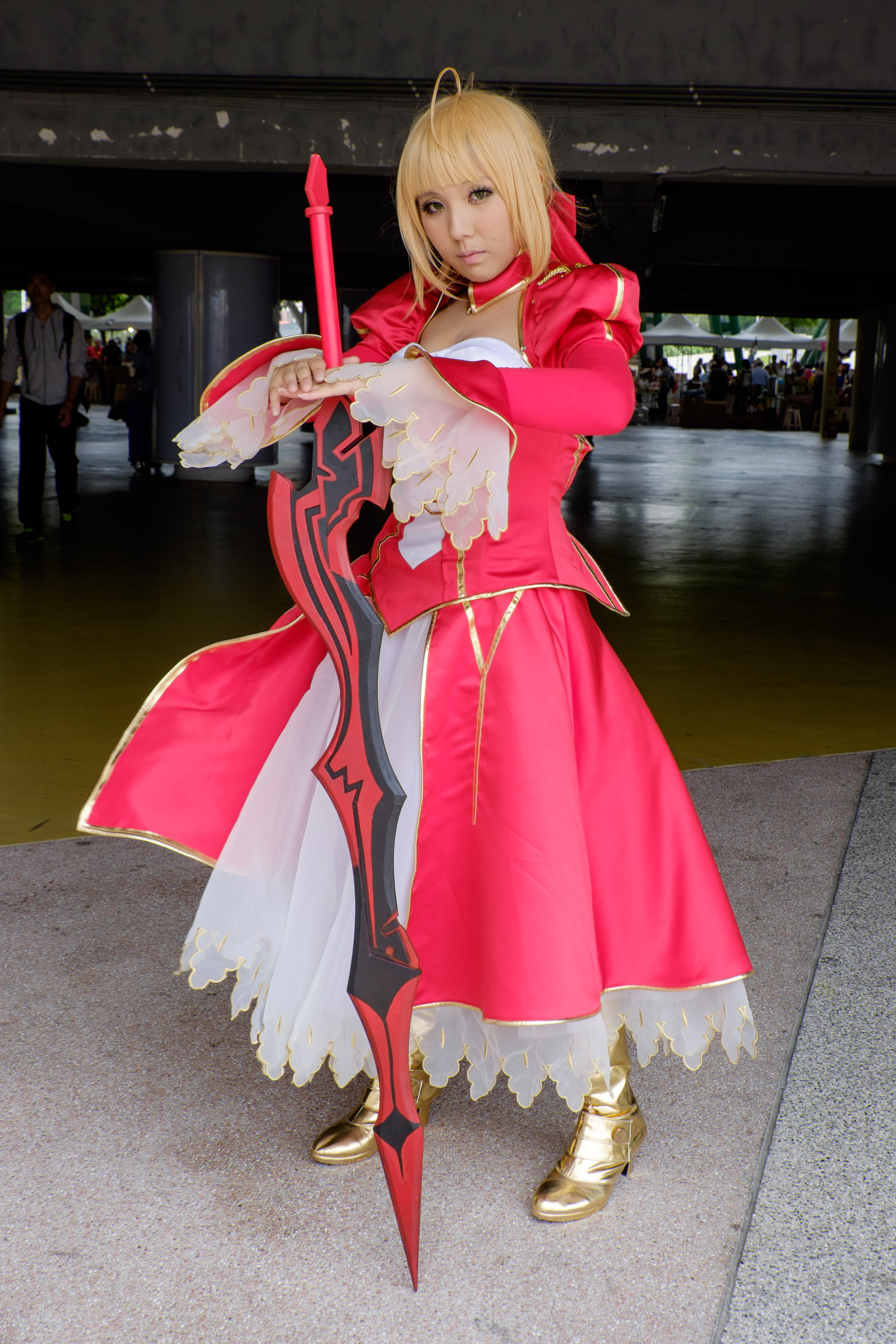
Cosplayer of Nero

To differentiate Fate/Extra from the rest of the Fate franchise, which have been illustrated by Takashi Takeuchi, Type-Moon producer Kazuya Niinō invited a third-party artist working under the pseudonym Arco Wada (Wadarco) to design the characters. Wada was commissioned to create a character that would be outwardly similar to Fate's previous principal heroine, Saber, to provoke the audience; the final design, called Red Saber, eventually kept about "30% of the original design". Niinō indicated to Wada that the Roman emperor Nero should become the historical prototype of the main heroic Servant. The original sketch, made to imitate Takeuchi's style, was rejected, and Niinō insisted on depicting the character in Wada's own style without unnecessary detail.

Initially, Fate's principal writer Kinoko Nasu doubted the possibility of realizing Nero's personality as the basis for Saber's heroine, and the creators considered other versions of the character's prototype. Although the initial decision to make Nero the main heroine was left unchanged, her personality was revised so that she would be more emphatic. As a Servant, Nero is summoned in her prime, before the full decline of her reign. She possesses a strong sense of imperial pride and a love for the arts, viewing herself as an accomplished performer and ruler who sought the adoration of her people. Her personality is characterized by haughtiness, theatrical flair, and underlying kindness toward her subjects and Master, often compensating for self-doubt regarding her historical reputation as a tyrant. She is depicted as a young woman of short but curvy stature with pale skin, yellowish-blonde hair, and bright lime-green eyes. Her primary outfit, designed by Arco Wada, is a revealing red-and-white dress with military-inspired elements. Alternative outfits include her white "Bride" dress that debuted in Fate/Extra CCC, a pure white gown with altered combat styling. In the Japanese releases, Nero is voiced by Sakura Tange. In the English dub of Fate/Extra Last Encore, she was voiced by Cassandra Morris.

== Critical reception ==
In a review of the anime adaptation for the Anime News Network, the reviewer noted that "Saber poses a striking figure with her red dress and generous curves". In the review of the Fate/Extella for Crunchyroll, the reviewer judged Nero to be "an immensely dramatic character". Although Nero debuted in the Fate/Extra series of games her popularity was bolstered by her continuing appearances in the ongoing Fate/Grand Order game.

In scholarly works, Nero has been also discussed as an example of how the Fate franchise adapts historical figures through a mix of anime conventions and gender flipping.

Media scholar David John Boyd identifies Nero Claudius as one of the central examples of the Fate franchise's practice of reimagining historical figures through alternative gender presentations and anime aesthetics. According to Boyd, the portrayal of Nero in the Fate/Extra subseries represented an important development in Type-Moon's treatment of historical figures. He argues that illustrator Wada Arco's depiction of Nero established a broader pattern of "shōjo-ification" within the franchise, transforming historical figures into emotionally expressive heroines whose characterization emphasizes affect, desire and subjectivity rather than conventional historical narratives. Boyd argues that the franchise portrays figures such as Nero, as well as Artoria Pendragon and several others, less famous characters, not primarily as agents of imperial power but as victims of historical violence and nationalist myth-making. In his interpretation, Nero belongs to a group of recurring characters who relive and confront traumatic memories associated with their historical legacies through repeated participation in the conflicts of the Fate universe (the Holy Grail Wars). He characterizes these figures as examples of what philosophers Gilles Deleuze and Félix Guattari describe as "becoming-woman", a process through which established historical identities are destabilized and reimagined from alternative perspectives. Boyd devotes particular attention to Nero's visual portrayal in the anime of Fate/Extra Last Encore. He argues that the series transforms the traditional image of the Roman emperor into "a full embodiment of the shōjo ideal", presenting Nero as an affirmative and life-embracing figure rather than emphasizing her conventional historical reputation. According to Boyd, the anime's opening sequence depicts Nero through recurring motifs of dance, flight, roses and movement among the ruins of Roman history, creating an image associated with vitality, freedom and resistance to historical determinism.

Boyd further interprets Nero as a symbolic figure through which the franchise explores questions of gender, history and identity. He argues that the character's design and presentation combine imperial imagery with shōjo aesthetics, producing what he describes as an affective and transhistorical reinterpretation of the historical emperor. In this reading, Nero functions not as a historically accurate representation but as a vehicle for exploring alternative historical memories and forms of personal transformation. Boyd writes that Fate franchise "transformed the historical memory of a mad emperor into a full embodiment of the shōjo ideal". Discussing the mobile game Fate/Grand Order, Boyd also cites Nero as an example of the franchise's use of digital intimacy and player-character interaction. He argues that the game's touchscreen interface encourages players to develop affective attachments to historical figures reimagined as fictional characters, with Nero serving as one of several examples through which users engage with the franchise's broader reinterpretation of world history.

In their study of classical figures in the Fate franchise, Nicole Becklinger and Jeremy Swist identify Nero as one of the most prominent ancient characters in the anime adaptations, describing her as the classical figure who receives the greatest amount of screen time across the franchise's anime works. Becklinger and Swist argue that Fate/Extra Last Encore deliberately reinterprets the historical reputation of Nero. Whereas ancient authors such as Tacitus and Suetonius portrayed the emperor as a tyrannical and capricious ruler, the anime presents Nero as a misunderstood sovereign whose devotion to ordinary citizens led to her downfall. According to the authors, the series reframes major episodes from Nero's reign, including the Great Fire of Rome and her conflict with the Roman aristocracy, in order to portray her as a tragic and sympathetic figure rather than a villain. The authors further note that Nero's characterization centers on performance and spectacle. Her Noble Phantasm, Aestus Domus Aurea, transforms the battlefield into a theatrical version of the emperor's palace and presents combat as a staged performance before an audience. Becklinger and Swist interpret this emphasis on theatre and performance as an adaptation of the historical Nero's well-attested interest in artistic competitions and public entertainments, recasting those traits in a positive light.

Some commentators have discussed Nero's visual design. Moore of Anime Feminist likewise criticized her costume (which the reviewers at Anime News Network explicitly ridicule as featuring a "butt window") for being too revealing, which she found in line with the franchise's disappointing treatment of women. On the other hand, Becklinger and Swist, who are known feminist themselves, acknowledge that while the series employs fan-service elements in Nero's design, they contend that her clothing choice is empowering and a complement to her gender transformation, and also engages with wider anime traditions of gender ambiguity and gender-fluid characterization. They also retorted that the Fate franchise itself has always treatment women far better than any franchise and that Type-Moon as a whole is a very Pro-Feminist, if not fully Feminist company with views that align both politically and ideologically to modern Feminism.

Becklinger and Swist also discuss Nero as part of the franchise's broader use of gender-swapped historical figures. They note that Nero resembles the Fate's gender-swapped King Arthur (Saber) in both design and narrative role, and argue that her portrayal reflects the increasing prominence of female protagonists and heroic figures within modern shōnen anime. The authors conclude that Nero's portrayal exemplifies the franchise's broader approach to historical adaptation. Rather than simply rejecting traditional historical narratives, Fate reinterprets them through the conventions of Japanese anime, producing a version of Nero that challenges inherited assumptions while remaining in dialogue with classical and historical sources.

Tomotani and Salvador discuss how the popularity of the Fate franchise made some Fate/Grand Order characters more culturally visible online than the historical, literary, or mythological figures on which they are based. They termed this phenomenon the "Astolfo Effect". Tomotani and Salvador note that, even through Nero is one of the most internationally famous historical characters portrayed in the game, his fictional, gender-swapped variant present in Fate has become more popular online than her historical original (claiming 49 out of 50 images found via Google Image search for the name Nero Claudius).
