= List of Fate/Extra Last Encore episodes =

Fate/Extra Last Encore is a loose anime adaptation of the role-playing game Fate/Extra produced by Shaft and aired from January 28 until July 29, 2018. Part of the Fate franchise by game studio Type-Moon, it was directed by Akiyuki Shinbo and Yukihiro Miyamoto with Kinoko Nasu and Hikaru Sakurai writing for the series's scripts. Masaaki Takiyama and Hiroki Yamamura (Shaft) designed the characters and served as chief animation directors, and Satoru Kōsaki composed the music. Riki Matsuura, Kousuke Murayama, and Rina Iwamoto (CUES) were the main animators. The opening theme is "Bright Burning Shout" by Takanori Nishikawa, while the ending theme is "Tsuki to Hanataba" (月と花束, Moon and Bouquet) by Sayuri.

== Episode list ==
No.	Title (Note: All English titles are taken from Netflix.)	Directed by (Note: Information is taken from the ending credits of each episode.)	Storyboarded by	Original release date
Oblitus Copernican Theory (Note: オブリトゥス地動説 (Oburitusu Chidōsetsu))
1	"Prateritus Limbus Vorago" / "The Present Lies at the Bottom of an Olden Limbo – Preteritus Limbus Vorago -"; Transliteration: "Ima wa kyū kin goku no soko -pureteritto~usu・rinbusu・vorāgo-" (Japanese: 今は旧き辺獄の底 -プレテリトゥス・リンブス・ヴォラーゴ-)	Yukihiro Miyamoto	Yukihiro Miyamoto; Kazuhiro Miwa	January 28, 2018
2	"Dead Face" / "Dead Phase – Dead Face -"; Transliteration: "Shisō -deddofeisu-" (Japanese: 死相 -デッドフェイス-)	Tatsuma Minamikawa	Mamoru Kurosawa	February 4, 2018
3	"Golden Wild Hunt" / "The Night of the Golden Hind and the Storm – Golden Wild Hunt -"; Transliteration: "Kogane shika to arashi no yoru -gōruden・wairudohanto-" (Japanese: 黄金鹿と嵐の夜 -ゴールデン・ワイルドハント-)	Takashi Asami	Mamoru Kurosawa	February 11, 2018
4	"No Face May King" / "Faceless King – No Face May King -"; Transliteration: "Kao no nai ō -nōfeisu・meikingu-" (Japanese: 顔の無い王 -ノーフェイス・メイキング-)	Yukihiro Miyamoto; Yasuhiro Geshi (Note: Geshi is credited in the show's TV credits, but his name is omitted in the Blu-Ray/DVD version.)	Takashi Kawabata	February 18, 2018
5	"Yew Bow" / "The Bow of Prayer – Yew Bow -"; Transliteration: "Inori no yumi -ī・bau-" (Japanese: 祈りの弓 -イー・バウ-)	Kazuomi Koga	Takashi Kawabata	February 25, 2018
6	"The Queen's Glass Game" / "Perpetual Engine Maiden Empire – Queens's Glass Game -"; Transliteration: "Eikyũ kikan・shōjo teikoku -kuīnzu・gurasugēmu-" (Japanese: 永久機関・少女帝国 -クイーンズ・グラスゲーム-)	Midori Yoshizawa	Shouji Saeki	March 4, 2018
7	"Nursery Rhyme" / "A Story for Someone's Sake – Nursery Rhyme -"; Transliteration: "Dareka no Tame no Monogatari – Nāsarī・Raimu –" (Japanese: 誰かの為の物語 -ナーサリー・ライム-)	Naoki Kotani	Shouji Saeki	March 11, 2018
8	"Bajiquan" / "No Second Strike – Dead End -"; Transliteration: "Nani Da – Deddo・Endo –" (Japanese: 无二打 -デッド・エンド-)	Takashi Asami	Mamoru Kurosawa	March 18, 2018
9	"Aestus Domus Aurea" / "Golden Theater of the Deranged – Aestus Domus Aurea -"; Transliteration: "Maneki tou kogane gekijō – Aesuto~usu・Domusu・Aurea –" (Japanese: 招き蕩う黄金劇場 -アエストゥス・ドムス・アウレア-)	Tatsuma Minamikawa	Mie Ooishi	March 25, 2018
10	"Unlimited/Raise Dead" / "Infinite Wreckage – Unlimited/Raise Dead -"; Transliteration: "Mugen no zangai – Anrimiteddo/Reizu・Deddo –" (Japanese: 無限の残骸 -アンリミテッド / レイズ・デッド-)	Yukihiro Miyamoto	Toshimasa Suzuki	April 1, 2018
Illustrias Geocentric Theory (Note: イルステリアス天動説 (Irusuteriasu Tendōsetsu))
11	"Excalibur Galatine" / Resurrected Sword of Victory – Excalibur Galatine – Transliteration: "Tenrin suru Shouri no Ken – Ekusukaribā Garatīn –" (Japanese: 転輪する勝利の剣 -エクスカリバー・ガラティーン-)	Kazuomi Koga	Takashi Kawabata	July 29, 2018
12	"Chakravartin" / Turner of the Wheel – Chakravartin – Transliteration: "Tenrin Jōō – Chakura Varutin –" (Japanese: 天輪聖王 -チャクラ・ヴァルティン-)	Yukihiro Miyamoto	Takashi Kawabata	July 29, 2018
13	"Olympia Plaudere" / Rose of Cheers – Olympia Plaudelet – Transliteration: "Kassai no Bara – Orinpia Puraudēre –" (Japanese: 喝采の薔薇 -オリンピア・プラウデーレ-)	Yukihiro Miyamoto; Mamoru Kurosawa; Naoki Kotani; Kenjirou Okada	Mamoru Kurosawa	July 29, 2018
