= Today's Menu for the Emiya Family =

Japanese manga series

- Cover of the first volume, featuring Saber and Shirou Emiya

衛宮さんちの今日のごはん (Emiya-sanchi no Kyō no Gohan)
- Genre: Comedy; Cooking; Slice of life
- Manga
- Written by: TAa
- Published by: Kadokawa Shoten
- English publisher: NA: Denpa
- Magazine: Young Ace Up
- Original run: January 26, 2016 – present
- Volumes: 12
- Original net animation
- Directed by: Takahiro Miura; Tetsuto Satō
- Produced by: Hikaru Kondo
- Written by: Ufotable
- Music by: Go Shiina
- Studio: Ufotable
- Licensed by: NA: Aniplex of America
- Released: January 25, 2018 – January 1, 2019
- Runtime: 13 minutes
- Episodes: 13
- Video game

Everyday♪ Today's Menu for the Emiya Family
- Developer: Aniplex
- Publisher: Aniplex
- Genre: Cooking
- Platform: Nintendo Switch
- Released: JP: April 28, 2021; NA: June 2, 2021

Today's Menu for the Emiya Family (衛宮さんちの今日のごはん, Emiya-sanchi no Kyō no Gohan) is a Japanese manga series written and illustrated by TAa. The series has been serialized on Kadokawa Shoten's Young Ace Up website since January 26, 2016, and has been collected in twelve tankōbon volumes as of March 26, 2026. The manga is licensed in North America by Denpa. They released its first English volume on March 13, 2019. It is a spin-off of Type-Moon's Fate/stay night series, set in an alternate universe where the Fifth Holy Grail War resolved with most of the characters surviving and later becoming friends and neighbours. The series revolves around the protagonist Shirou Emiya's daily life cooking various types of Japanese cuisine for his family and friends. A thirteen-episode original net animation adaptation by Ufotable aired monthly from January 25, 2018, to January 1, 2019.

== Synopsis ==
The story takes place in an alternate universe resembling Fate/hollow ataraxia where Shirou Emiya lives peacefully with his family and friends in Fuyuki City. It focuses on Shirou cooking various types of Japanese cuisine for his family and friends throughout the year's four seasons.

There is also an anime adaptation with 13 episodes, each focusing on different recipes and the characters' interactions.

== Media ==
=== Manga ===
Today's Menu for the Emiya Family, written and illustrated by TAa, began serialisation on Kadokawa Shoten's Young Ace Up website since January 26, 2016. Twelve tankōbon volumes have been released as of March 26, 2026. A special edition of volume 6 including a recipe book was also released alongside the standard volume. North American manga publishing company Denpa has licensed the series and released the first English print volume on March 12, 2019. The manga has also been licensed in Taiwan and Thailand.

==== Volume list ====
No.	Original release date	Original ISBN	English release date	English ISBN
1	January 26, 2017	978-4-04-105231-0	February 26, 2019 (digital); March 12, 2019 (physical)	978-1-63442-936-8
2	December 26, 2017	978-4-04-106391-0	June 25, 2019	978-1-63442-938-2
3	September 22, 2018	978-4-04-107355-1	September 9, 2019 (digital); October 29, 2019 (physical)	978-1-63442-950-4
4	July 25, 2019	978-4-04-108475-5	August 5, 2022 (digital); August 2, 2022 (physical)	978-1-63442-954-2
5	February 22, 2020	978-4-04-108477-9	September 26, 2023	978-1-63442-990-0
6	January 26, 2021	978-4-04-110820-8	January 27, 2026	978-1-63442-825-5
7	October 8, 2021	978-4-04-111679-1	May 26, 2026	978-1-63442-846-0
8	August 26, 2022	978-4-04-112515-1	September 4, 2026	978-1-63442-893-4
9	November 25, 2023	978-4-04-113252-4	—	—
10	August 26, 2024	978-4-04-115223-2	—	—
11	March 25, 2025	978-4-04-115426-7	—	—
12	March 26, 2026	978-4-04-117038-0	—	—

=== Anime ===
An original net animation adaptation premiered during the Fate Project New Year's Eve TV Special on December 31, 2017. The anime began streaming in Japan on February 1, 2018, with each episode premiering on the first of every month. It is produced by Ufotable, which had previously worked with Type-Moon on the majority of the Fate/stay night anime adaptations. The anime is directed by Takahiro Miura and Tetsuto Satō, produced by Hikaru Kondo, and written by the Ufotable staff. Toko Uchimura designed the characters, and Go Shiina composed the music. The opening theme song is "Apron Boy" by DJ Misoshiru & MC Gohan, and the ending theme song is "Collage" by Sangatsu no Phantasia. The anime is licensed in North America by Aniplex of America and began streaming on Crunchyroll on January 25, 2018. The series ran for 13 episodes.

==== Episode list ====
No.	Title (Note: All English titles are taken from Crunchyroll.)	Original air date
1	"New Year's Eve Soba" "Toshikoshi soba" (年越しそば)	January 25, 2018
2	"Foil-Baked Buttered Salmon and Mushrooms" "Sake to kinoko no bataa hoiruyaki" (鮭ときのこのバターホイル焼き)	February 1, 2018
3	"Spring Chirashi-Sushi" "Haru no chirashizushi" (春のちらし寿司)	March 1, 2018
4	"Spring Vegetable and Bacon Sandwiches" "Haru yasai to becon no sandoicchi" (春野菜とベーコンのサンドイッチ)	April 1, 2018
5	"Bamboo Shoots Gratin" "Takenoko guratan" (たけのこグラタン)	May 1, 2018
6	"My First Hamburg Steak" "Hajimete no hanbaagu" (はじめてのハンバーグ)	June 1, 2018
7	"Quick 'n Easy Chilled Green Tea Over Rice" "Sarari to itadaku hiyashi chazuke" (さらりと頂く冷やし茶漬け)	July 1, 2018
8	"Tohsaka-san's Chop Suey Fried Rice" "Tohsaka-san no gomoku chaahan" (遠坂さんの五目炒飯)	August 1, 2018
9	"The Flavors of Autumn -Caster's Japanese Cooking Trials Edition-" "Aki no mikaku -Kyasuta washoku shugyou hen-" (秋の味覚-キャスター和食修行編-)	September 1, 2018
10	"Fried Chicken That's Even Delicious Cold" "Sametemo oishii karaage" (冷めても美味しいからあげ)	October 1, 2018
11	"Extra-Special Soft and Melty Omelet Rice" "Tokusei fuwatoro omuraisu" (特製ふわとろオムライス)	November 1, 2018
12	"One-Pan Roast Beef" "Furaipan dake de tsukuru rosuto bifu" (フライパンだけで作るローストビーフ)	December 1, 2018
13	"Heartwarming Stew" "Attaka yosenabe" (あったか寄せ鍋)	January 1, 2019

=== Video game ===
A video game adaptation of the manga, titled Everyday♪ Today's Menu for the Emiya Family (毎日♪衛宮さんちの今日のごはん, Mainichi♪ Emiya-sanchi no Kyō no Gohan) is published by Aniplex for the Nintendo Switch as a download-only title. The game was meant to be released in May 2020 until it was delayed to April 28, 2021, due to the COVID-19 pandemic. Aniplex later announced the game would get a North American release, which occurred on June 2, 2021. Kim Morrissey of Anime News Network gave the game a negative review, writing that "With its sparse content, performance issues, and tepid dialogue, Everyday♪ Today's MENU for EMIYA Family is a bad game even by the standards of low-budget anime tie-ins."
