= Fate/Extella: The Umbral Star =

Video game in Fate franchise

- Cover art featuring Archer/Nameless (far left), Nero Claudius (left), Altera (center), Tamamo no Mae (right) and Saber/Arturia Pendragon (far right).
- Developers: Extella: Marvelous; Extella Link: Marvelous First Studio
- Publisher: Xseed Games: JP: Marvelous
- Director: Hiromi Sakamoto
- Producer: Kenichiro Tsukuda
- Artist: Arco Wada
- Writers: Extella: Kinoko Nasu; Hikaru Sakurai; Extella Link: Yūichirō Higashide; Ukyō Kodachi
- Composers: Extella: Keita Haga; James Harris; Extella Link: Keiichi Okabe; Ryuichi Takada; Keigo Hoashi; Shotaro Seo
- Platforms: PlayStation 4; PlayStation Vita; Nintendo Switch; Microsoft Windows; iOS; Android
- Release: PlayStation 4, PlayStation Vita: JP: November 10, 2016; NA: January 17, 2017; EU: January 20, 2017; Nintendo Switch: JP: July 20, 2017; PAL: July 21, 2017; NA: July 25, 2017; Microsoft Windows: WW: July 25, 2017; Android, iOS: JP: 22 July 2020
- Genres: Action, hack and slash
- Mode: Single-player

Fate/Extella: The Umbral Star (Note: Japanese: フェイト/エクステラ: アンブラルスター, Hepburn: Feito/Extella: Anburarusutā; lit. Fate/Extella: The Umbral Star) is an action video game developed and published by Marvelous. It is the third installment in the Fate/Extra universe, following the earlier Fate/Extra CCC. It was first announced in March 2016 and released in Japan in November 2016 for the PlayStation 4 and PlayStation Vita consoles; its release in North America and Europe occurred in January 2017. Nintendo Switch and Microsoft Windows versions were released in July 2017 for all three regions.

The game follows the conflict between two factions led by Nero and Tamamo from the original Fate/Extra game, fighting each other over control of the Moon Cell and the Holy Grail. They are soon joined by a third faction led by Altera who has the intent of destroying civilization as well as Saber from Fate/stay night who wishes to stop the conflict between the three factions. A direct sequel titled Fate/Extella Link was released for PS4 in Japan in 2018, and later worldwide for PS4, Switch and PC in 2019.

== Gameplay ==
Fate/Extella is a single-player action game in which the player takes the role of a "master", who works together with spirits known as servants, who fight large numbers of enemies similar to Dynasty Warriors. The player can customize the master, choosing their name and gender. There are sixteen playable servants in the game, divided into eight classes: Saber, Archer, Lancer, Caster, Assassin, Rider, Berserker, and Extra Class. Different servants have different fighting styles: the Saber swordswoman Nero Claudius has powerful sword skills and balanced abilities; the Caster magus Tamamo no Mae can use magic skills and raw firepower but lower defense; and the Saber swordswoman Attila uses a violent battle style.

As servants, the player can run around on the battlefield and attack with strong or weak attacks; by using certain combinations of these, the player can trigger a combo attack. The player can protect themselves from enemy attacks by guarding, or by avoiding the attack with an aerial dash. By consuming some of a gauge, the player can use the special attack Extella Maneuver, where strikes to single enemies also deal damage to other enemies surrounding it. Servants can be powered up through the use of "form change", a gameplay mechanic that alters their appearance and weapons, allowing them to take down nearby enemies with ease. Transformations differ depending on the character: for example, Nero's is based on fire, while Tamamo no Mae's is based on snow.

A mode called Area Supremacy Battle is available, in which Servants attack sectors and try to obtain Regime Matrices – keys that give control over the area. Each sector has a different number of keys; the player wins by collecting fifteen of them. In addition to just fighting enemies, the player also needs to protect their own sector in this mode.

== Synopsis ==
=== Characters and setting ===
The game is set after the events of the Holy Grail War in the first game Fate/Extra. Nero and her master (whose true name is Hakuno Kishinami) have won the war, giving them control over the Moon Cell Automaton computer, which has the power to grant a wish. As proof of their kingship, they have obtained the Regalia ring, with which they rule over the former enemy servants; they are however confronted by a new enemy, which also holds a Regalia. The story is told from the perspectives of Nero, Tamamo no Mae and Altera (also known as Attila); in addition to the main story, the game also includes side stories focusing on the other servants.

== Development ==
Fate/Extella was developed by Marvelous, written by Kinoko Nasu and Hikaru Sakurai, with character designs by Arco Wada. When the game was announced in March 2016, development was 60% finished. Development began after the previous Fate game, Fate/Extra CCC, was finished. It is written as an independent story, with Takashi Takeuchi describing it as not being a counter to Fate/stay night or a sequel to Extra; according to Nasu, the story still "inherits the blood of Extra".

Marvelous has developed alternative costumes for characters as downloadable content: one such costume, for Gilgamesh, had to be redesigned for "various reasons". While Marvelous did not elaborate, some journalists speculated that it was due to its resemblance to Nazi officer uniforms.

== Release ==
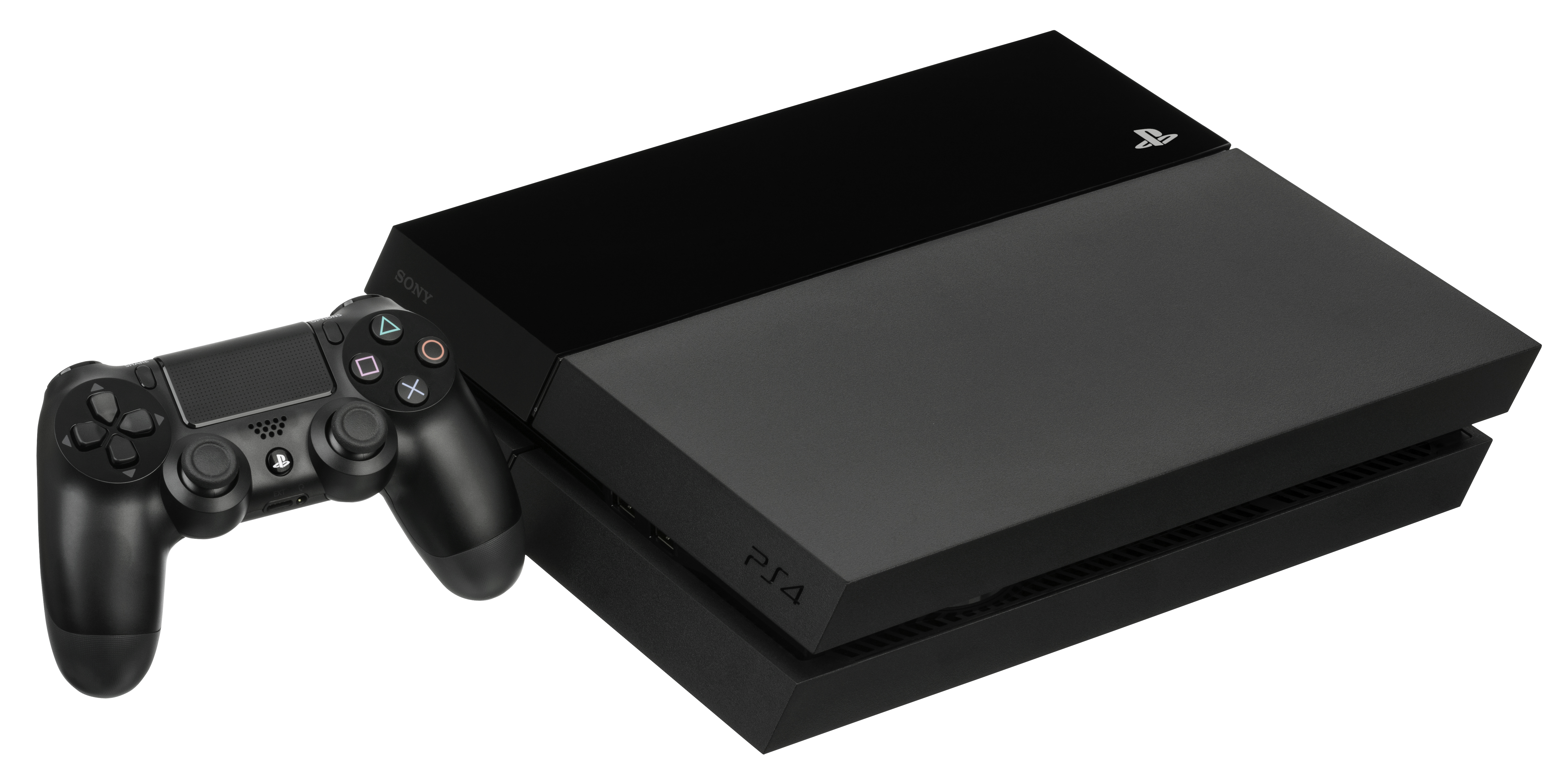
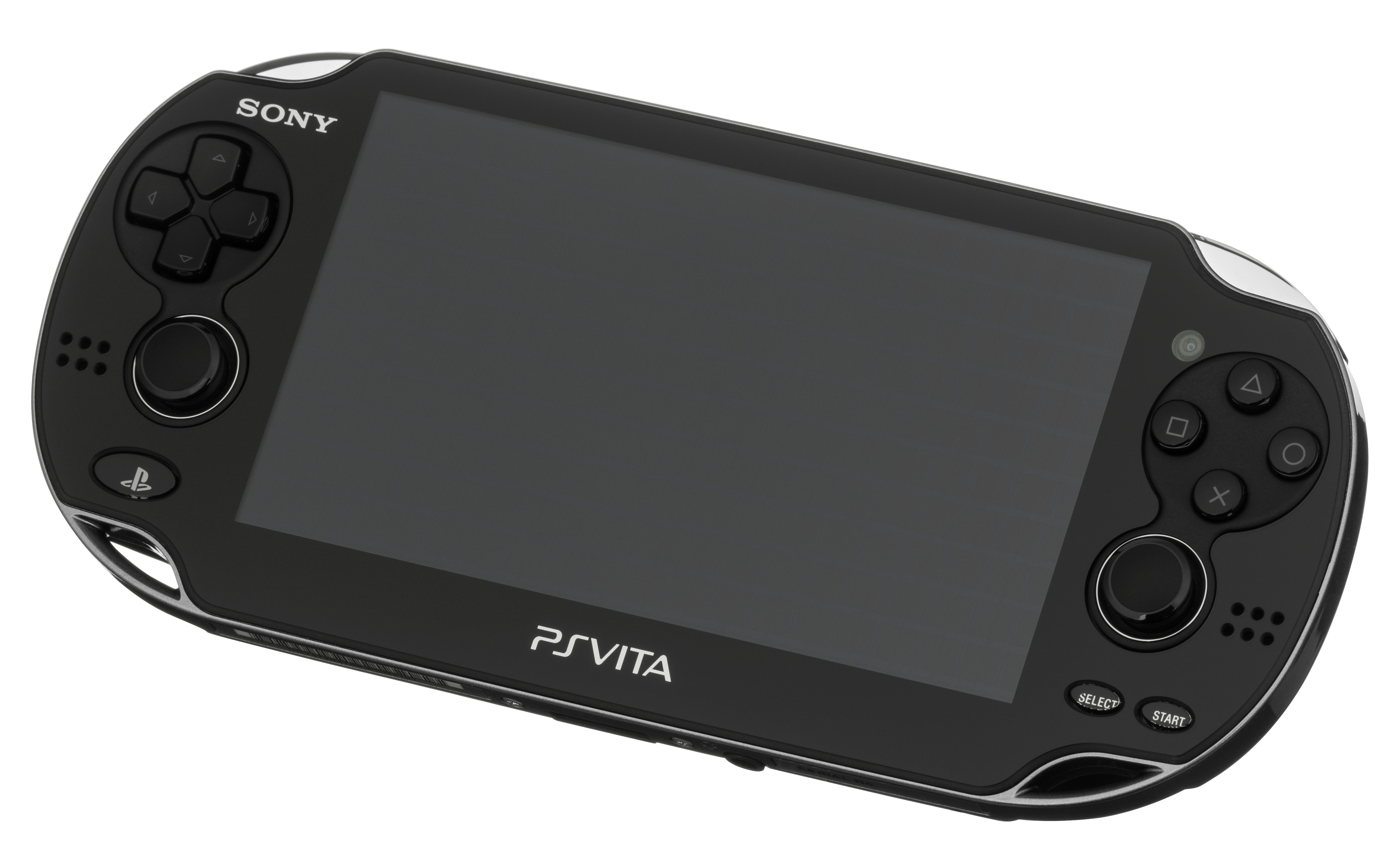
Umbral Star was originally released for the PlayStation 4 and the PlayStation Vita (pictured) in Japan on November 10, 2016.

The game was released for the PlayStation 4 and the PlayStation Vita in Japan by Marvelous, on November 10, 2016, Europe and Australia on January 20, 2017, and by Xseed Games in North America on January 17, 2017. A Nintendo Switch version was also planned for release. The PlayStation 4 version would receive a patch that adds support for the PlayStation 4 Pro hardware.

Multiple editions of the game were made available in Japan: the "Velber Box" includes one copy of the game for the PlayStation 4 and one for the PlayStation Vita, a box with art by Wada, a 3D mouse-pad with a Saber servant design, a book with development information and a glossary, a download code for alternative costumes for the servants Nero and Gilgamesh; the "Regalia Box" includes one copy of the game for either platform, the box, the book, and a download code for one of the costumes included in the Velber Box. All Japanese copies of the game also come with a download code for two additional costumes, for Nero and Artoria Pendragon. Copies bought at Loppi or HMV also include one more costume, for a male character. Meanwhile, Japanese digital purchases include a "Dragon Magician Girl" costume for Elizabeth Bathory. Additional downloadable costumes will be published after the game's release, including a set of nine swimsuits, one set of seven women's clothes, one set of nine men's clothes, and one of three Fate/stay night costumes.

A Nintendo Direct held on April 12, 2017 announced that the game would be released on Nintendo Switch on July 20, 2017 in Japan, in Europe and Australia on July 21, and in North America on July 25. The game was bundled with DLC costumes for all characters for free, including Nero's Unshackled Bride outfit (the revealing version of Saber Bride outfit) exclusively on Nintendo Switch. Unlike the PlayStation 4 and PlayStation Vita versions, the Nintendo Switch version of the game allows players to choose four languages, Japanese, English, Traditional Chinese and Korean. The Japanese trailer of the game announced the Limited Box Edition which includes Nero Pouch and the game itself.

On July 5, 2017, a Microsoft Windows version was announced for release on July 25, coinciding with the North American launch of the Nintendo Switch version.

Marvelous Inc. later released Fate/Extella: The Umbral Star for mobile devices on July 22, 2020 in Japan.

== Reception ==
Reception

Aggregate score
Aggregator	Score
Metacritic	PS4: 67/100; NS: 69/100

Review scores
Publication	Score
Computer Games Magazine	(PS4) 6/10 (NS) 6.5/10
Destructoid	6/10
GameRevolution	6/10
Nintendo Life	8/10
Nintendo World Report	7.5/10
Push Square	7/10

According to review aggregator website Metacritic, Fate/Extella: The Umbral Star received "mixed or average" reviews from critics aimed towards its PlayStation 4 and Nintendo Switch ports.

Lilian C. for Destructoid considered it a "decent" game despite its "lack of variety", whereas Robert Ramsey at Push Square had criticized its repetitiveness, which he felt "bled" into the experience over time. GameRevolution's Matthew Utley had criticized its "unusual choice of font size". Both Ramsey and Utley agreed that a downside of Fate/Extella: The Umbral Star was its "repetitiveness". Morgan Sleeper at Nintendo Life felt the game was a "colourfully appealing character action title with fast-paced gameplay and an engaging, visual novel-like story".

=== Sales and accolades ===
Fate/Extella: The Umbral Star had sold 140,375 units in Japan within first week. On the digital distribution service Steam, it was regarded as one of the "Best Games of 2017" in July of that same year. In June 2018, the PlayStation Vita (PSV) and PlayStation 4 (PS4) versions topped the Gematsu Media Create Sales chart, with 38,156 and 78,647 copies sold respectively.

== Other media ==
The game inspired spinoff manga Fate/Ikustella by Rōto Usagi, which launched in March 2018.
