= List of low fantasy works =

This list contains a variety of notable examples of low fantasy fiction. Low fantasy is a subgenre of fantasy defined by being set in the primary world as opposed to a secondary world like high fantasy. They are organized by alphabetical order by the author's last name. A separate section is included for non-print media.

== Works ==
=== B ===
- Tuck Everlasting by Natalie Babbitt
- The Indian in the Cupboard by Lynne Reid Banks
- The Dresden Files by Jim Butcher

=== C ===
- Mortal Instruments series by Cassandra Clare
- The Dark Is Rising by Susan Cooper
- The Chronicles of Narnia by C. S. Lewis

=== D ===
- The Bewitching Season by Marissa Doyle

=== G ===
- Good Omens by Neil Gaiman and Terry Pratchett
- The Doll's House by Rumer Godden
- Tall Story by Candy Gourlay

=== H ===
- Magic, Inc. by Robert A. Heinlein
- The Power of Five by Anthony Horowitz

=== L ===
- That Hideous Strength by C. S. Lewis

=== N ===
- Five Children and It by E. Nesbit
- The Snow Spider by Jenny Nimmo
- The Borrowers by Mary Norton

=== R ===
- Harry Potter by JK Rowling

=== S ===
- The Hussite Trilogy by Andrzej Sapkowski
- The Viper by Andrzej Sapkowski

== Other media ==
- Bewitched
- I Dream of Jeannie

=== Literature ===
- The Green Mile by Stephen King
- The Owl Service by Alan Garner
- Tom's Midnight Garden by Philippa Pearce
- The Idhún's Memories by Laura Gallego

=== Comics ===
- Fables by Bill Willingham
- Hellblazer by Alan Moore and Stephen R. Bissette
- Preacher by Garth Ennis, Glenn Fabry and Steve Dillon

=== Gaming ===
- The Cat Lady
- White Wolf Publishing's "World of Darkness" setting, including:
  - Vampire: The Masquerade (1991)
  - Werewolf: The Apocalypse (1992)
  - Mage: The Ascension (1993)

In the sense mentioned above of focusing on ordinary people and events and downplaying magic, rather than the sense of taking place in the primary world:

- Mount and Blade
- Skirmisher Publishing LLC (d20 RPG)
- Thief

=== Television ===
- I Dream of Jeannie (1965–1970)
- Forever Knight (1992–1996)
- Kindred: The Embraced (1996)
- Buffy the Vampire Slayer (1997–2003)
- Charmed (1998–2006)
- Supernatural (2005–2020)
- New Amsterdam (2008)
- True Blood (2008–2014)
- The Listener (2009–2014)
- Lost Girl (2010–2015)
- Evermoor (2014, 2015–present)
- Man Seeking Woman (2015–2017)
- Stranger Things (2016–2025)

== Print ==
=== Literature ===
- Mary Poppins by P. L. Travers (1934–1988)
- Charlie and the Chocolate Factory by Roald Dahl (1964)
  - Charlie and the Great Glass Elevator (1971)
- Kiki's Delivery Service by Eiko Kadono (1985)
- Good Omens by Terry Pratchett and Neil Gaiman (1990)
- Harry Potter by J. K. Rowling (1997–2007)
- The Dresden Files by Jim Butcher (2000–present)
- American Gods by Neil Gaiman (2001)
  - Anansi Boys (2005)
- Shakugan no Shana by Yashichiro Takahashi (2002–2012)
- Baccano! by Ryōgo Narita (2003–present)
- A Certain Magical Index by Kazuma Kamachi (2004–2010)
- Durarara!! by Ryōgo Narita (2004–2014)
- Camp Half-Blood chronicles by Rick Riordan (2005–present)
- Monogatari by Nisio Isin (2005–present)
- Twilight by Stephenie Meyer (2005–2008)
- Fate Series
  - Fate/Zero by Gen Urobuchi (2006–2007)
  - Fate/Apocrypha by Yūichirō Higashide (2012–2014)
  - Fate/strange fake by Ryōgo Narita (2015–present)
- Squid Girl by Masahiro Anbe (2007–2016)
- The Kane Chronicles by Rick Riordan (2010–2012)
- Magnus Chase and the Gods of Asgard by Rick Riordan (2015–2017)
- The BFG by Roald Dahl (1982)

=== Comics ===
- Fist of the North Star by Buronson (1983–1988)
- JoJo's Bizarre Adventure by Hirohiko Araki (1987–present)
- Ranma ½ by Rumiko Takahashi (1987–1996)
- Yu Yu Hakusho by Yoshihiro Togashi (1990–1994)
- Sailor Moon by Naoko Takeuchi (1991–1997)
- Cardcaptor Sakura by Clamp (1996–2000)
- Inuyasha by Rumiko Takahashi (1996–2008)
- Shaman King by Hiroyuki Takei (1998–2004)
- Bleach by Tite Kubo (2001–2016)
- Negima! Magister Negi Magi by Ken Akamatsu (2003–2012)
  - UQ Holder! (2013–present)
- D.Gray-man by Katsura Hoshino (2004–present)
- Reborn! by Akira Amano (2004–present)
- Soul Eater by Atsushi Ōkubo (2004–2013)
- Black Butler by Yana Toboso (2006–present)
- Fate/kaleid liner Prisma Illya by Hiroshi Hiroyama (2007–2008)
- Attack on Titan by Hajime Isayama (2009–present)
- Blue Exorcist by Kazue Kato (2009–present)
- Tokyo Ghoul by Sui Ishida (2011–2014)
  - Tokyo Ghoul [Jack] (2013)
  - Tokyo Ghoul:re (2014–present)

== Film and television ==
=== Live action ===
- Ghostbusters by Dan Aykroyd and Harold Ramis (1984–present)
- Highlander by Gregory Widen (1986–)
- Beetlejuice by Tim Burton (1988)
- Hercules and the Amazon Women by Bill L. Norton (1994)
  - Hercules and the Lost Kingdom by Harley Cokeliss (1994)
  - Hercules and the Circle of Fire by Doug Lefler (1994)
  - Hercules in the Underworld by Bill L. Norton (1994)
  - Hercules in the Maze of the Minotaur by Josh Becker (1994)
  - Hercules: The Legendary Journeys by Christian Williams (1995–1999)
  - Xena: Warrior Princess by Robert Tapert (1995–2001)
  - Young Hercules by Robert Tapert (1998–1999)
- Buffy the Vampire Slayer by Joss Whedon (1997–2003)
  - Angel by Joss Whedon and David Greenwalt (1999–2004)
- Charmed by Constance M. Burge (1998–2006)
- Harry Potter by Chris Columbus (1–2), Alfonso Cuarón (3), Mike Newell (4), and David Yates (5–8) (2001–2011)
- Pirates of the Caribbean by Jerry Bruckheimer (2003–present)
- Supernatural by Eric Kripke (2005–present)
- The Dresden Files by Hans Beimler and Robert Hewitt Wolfe (2007)
- The Twilight Saga by Summit Entertainment (2008–2012)
- Percy Jackson & the Olympians: The Lightning Thief by Chris Columbus (2010)
  - Percy Jackson: Sea of Monsters (2005) by Thor Freudenthal (2013)
- IF by John Krasinski (2024)
- Inception by Christopher Nolan (2010)
- Willy Wonka and the Chocolate Factory by Mel Stuart (1974)
  - Wonka by Paul King (2023)
- Charlie and the Chocolate Factory by Tim Burton (2005)
- The BFG by Steven Spielberg (2016)

=== Animation ===
- My Neighbor Totoro by Hayao Miyazaki (1988)
- Kiki's Delivery Service by Hayao Miyazaki (1989)
- Princess Mononoke by Hayao Miyazaki (1997)
- The Fairly OddParents by Butch Hartman (2001–present)
- The Grim Adventures of Billy & Mandy by Maxwell Atoms (2001–2008)
- Samurai Jack by Genndy Tartakovsky (Season 1-4: 2001–2004; Season 5: 2017)
- Spirited Away by Hayao Miyazaki (2001)
- Danny Phantom by Butch Hartman (2004–2007)
- Dave the Barbarian by Doug Langdale (2004–2005)
- Foster's Home for Imaginary Friends by Craig McCracken (2004–2009)
- Magical Girl Lyrical Nanoha (2004–present)
- Pretty Cure by Izumi Todo (2004–present)
- American Dragon: Jake Long by Jeff Goode (2005–2007)
- The Life and Times of Juniper Lee by Judd Winick (2005–2007)
- Regular Show by J. G. Quintel (2010–2017)
- Puella Magi Madoka Magica by Shaft and Aniplex (2011)
- Gravity Falls by Alex Hirsch (2012–2016)
- Kill la Kill by Trigger (2013–2014)
- Steven Universe by Rebecca Sugar (2013–present)
- Tome of the Unknown by Patrick McHale (2013)
  - Over the Garden Wall (2014)
- Uncle Grandpa by Peter Browngardt (2013–2017)
- Fate Series
  - Fate/stay night: Unlimited Blade Works by Yuji Yamaguchi (2010)
  - Fate/kaleid liner Prisma Illya 2wei by Silver Link (2014)
  - Fate/stay night: Unlimited Blade Works by Aniplex, Notes, and Ufotable (2014–2015)
  - Fate/kaleid liner Prisma Illya: Oath Under Snow by Hiroshi Hiroyama (2017)
  - Fate/stay night: Heaven's Feel by Ufotable (2017)
  - Fate/Extra Last Encore by Shaft (2018–)
- DuckTales by Walt Disney Television (1987–1990)
- DuckTales by Walt Disney Television (2017–2021)

== Games ==
=== Tabletop ===
- Ars Magica by Jonathan Tweet and Mark Rein-Hagen (1987–present)
- Shadowrun by FASA, Fantasy Productions, and Catalyst Game Labs (1989–present)
- Unknown Armies by John Scott Tynes and Greg Stolze (1998–present)
- d20 Modern by Wizards of the Coast (2002)
- Scion by Monte Cook (2007–present)
- Numenera by Monte Cook (2013)

=== Video ===
- Megami Tensei by Atlus (1987–present)
- Street Fighter by Capcom (1987–present)
- Mother by Shigesato Itoi (1989)
- Mortal Kombat by Midway Games (1992–2011) and NetherRealm Studios (2011–present)
- The King of Fighters by SNK (1994–present)
- Tekken by Bandai Namco Entertainment (formerly Namco) (1994–present)
- Guilty Gear by Arc System Works (1998–present)
- Tsukihime by Type-Moon (2000)
  - Kagetsu Tohya (2001)
  - Melty Blood by Type-Moon and French Bread (2002)
- Ace Attorney by Capcom (2001–present)
- Devil May Cry by Hideki Kamiya (2001–present)
- Onimusha by Capcom (2001–present)
- Higurashi When They Cry by 07th Expansion (2002–2014)
  - Umineko When They Cry (2007–2011)
- Fate/stay night by Type-Moon (2004)
  - Fate/hollow ataraxia (2005)
  - Fate/tiger colosseum by Cavia and Type-Moon (2007)
  - Fate/unlimited codes by Eighting (2008)
  - Fate/Extra by Type-Moon and Image Epoch (2010)
  - Fate/Grand Order by DELiGHTWORKS (2015)
  - Fate/Extella: The Umbral Star by Marvelous (2016)
- God of War by David Jaffe (2005–present)
- BlazBlue by Arc System Works (2008–present)
- Bayonetta by Hideki Kamiya (2009)
  - Bayonetta 2 (2014)
- Skullgirls by Marvelous and Autumn Games (2012)

== Web fiction ==
=== Webcomics ===
- Stand Still, Stay Silent by Minna Sundberg (2013–present)

== See also ==
- List of high fantasy fiction
