= Shirou Emiya =

Fictional character from the Fate series

- Fate character
- Shirou Emiya in Fate/Grand Order, as illustrated by Takashi Takeuchi
- First game: Fate/stay night (2004)
- Created by: Kinoko Nasu
- Designed by: Takashi Takeuchi
- Voiced by: English: Sam Riegel (Fate/stay night, UBW film) Patrick Poole (Prisma Illya) Bryce Papenbrook (UBW, Heaven's Feel) Mona Marshall (young); Japanese: Noriaki Sugiyama Junko Noda (young)

Shirou Emiya (Japanese: 衛宮 士郎, Hepburn: Emiya Shirō), also written as "Shiro Emiya" in Fate/unlimited codes, is a fictional character and the main protagonist of the 2004 eroge visual novel Fate/Stay Night, published by Type-Moon. Shirou is a teenager who accidentally participates in the "Holy Grail War" alongside six other mages looking for the eponymous treasure, an all-powerful, wish-granting relic. Shirou was the sole survivor of a fire in a city and was saved by a man named Kiritsugu Emiya who inspired him to become a hero and avoid killing people during fights. While fighting alongside the servant Saber, Shirou develops his own magical skills and, depending on the player's choices; he forms relationships with the novel's other characters. He also appears in the visual novel sequel Fate/hollow ataraxia, the prequel light novel Fate/Zero, and printed and animated adaptations of the original game.

Writer Kinoko Nasu created Shirou and Saber in stories he had written as a teenager. Nasu was worried that the story would not work as a bishōjo game because the main character was a girl. Artist Takashi Takeuchi suggested switching the sexes of the protagonist and Saber to fit into the game market. For the anime adaptations following Fate/Zero, the staff wanted to make the character more serious in his interactions with the other characters while giving him a more cheerful personality in contrast to the original visual novel. Shirou is regularly voiced in Japanese by Noriaki Sugiyama as a teenager and Junko Noda as a child; multiple voice actors have voiced him in the English releases of the anime adaptations.

Critics have commented on Shirou's different characterizations; his role in each part of the original Fate/stay night visual novel has received positive reaction due to his character development. Shirou's appearance in Studio Deen's first Fate/stay night–based anime received a mixed response; critics initially disliked Shirou but praised how his relationship with Saber evolved as well as his overall progress as a character. The character received mixed responses again in Ufotable's anime series, based on the visual novel's route Unlimited Blade Works.Shirou has also appeared in multiple polls related to Fate and anime in general.

== Creation and conception ==
Shirou's role in the story was meant to highlight parts of his personality and growth based on the paths the player picks. The first Fate storyline shows his slanted mind; the next, Unlimited Blade Works, presents his resolve, and in the last storyline, Heaven's Feel, he becomes Sakura Matou's ally and abandons his life-long passion of becoming a hero. Shirou was created with the idea of being a stubborn man with ideals that would change the way his role in the story based on the different routes, something the Type-Moon originally wanted to make with the protagonist of Tsukihime. Furthermore, Nasu wanted to portray him as a typical teenager while artist Takashi Takeuchi did not want him to have too much individuality in order to make players project themselves into him. By the end of the making of the visual novel, Nasu described Shirou as a joyless hero disinterested in the war, denying himself personal happiness in order to save as many people as possible. Shirou's character theme, "Emiya", while remixes and other themes were created to focus on important scenes related to his character.

=== Design ===
Shirou was initially conceived as a young girl by Kinoko Nasu until it was decided to change his sex to appeal to gamers. The design eventually became a separate character named Ayaka Sajyou of Fate/Prototype and Fate/strange fake (voiced by Kana Hanazawa).

Before writing Fate/stay night, Kinoko Nasu wrote the Fate route of the visual novel in his spare time as a high school student. Nasu originally imagined Shirou Emiya as a female character named Ayaka Sajyou (沙条綾香) who wore glasses and Saber as male. Nasu swapped their sexes due to his experience writing the novel Tsukihime and because Type-Moon believed a male protagonist would better fit the target demographic. There have been only small changes to Shirou's physical design since its inception. With red hair and stubborn eyes, Takeuchi aimed for a typical design of a straightforward shōnen manga genre character. He felt that it was too standard, however, so he added more circles in his eyes. Takeuchi has trouble bringing out Shirou's expressions because of his unique eyebrows; as a result, Shirou remains the most difficult Fate/stay night character for him to draw. Their goal of creating "a protagonist without a face" to comply with the nature of bishōjo games in the initial release of Fate/stay night is another reason Takeuchi had trouble drawing Shirou, who only appeared in a handful of scenes. In the re-released Réalta Nua version of the visual novel aimed at teenagers rather than just adults, the importance to show non-adult content was increased. So Takeuchi had to draw Shirou more often. Producer Tomonori Sudou felt that the staff had to draw Shirou more appealingly to bring more success to the anime. New clothing was also given to him.

While Shirou retains his usual appearance in the spin-off manga Fate/kaleid liner Prisma Illya 3rei!! by author Hiroshi Hiroyama, during parts of his story, Shirou uses a magical card that dresses him in Archer's clothes. Hiroyama originally drew Shirou half-naked but felt this was ridiculous, mostly because the events depicted in the series take place in winter. In his final design, most of Shirou's torso is covered, giving him an appearance like that of his future heroic persona, with the exception of his right arm remaining uncovered. Already experienced in drawing Shirou before he started working on Illya's spin-off manga, Hiroyama had no problems with this version of Shirou, whom he referred to as one of the manga's protagonists due to the focus he gave him during the flashbacks about his past; Similar to the original visual novel, Hiroyama wanted to make Shirou select a route during his flashback chapters as he embarks on a quest to protect his sister, Miyu.

=== Personality ===
Nasu believes Shirou and Ryougi Shiki in The Garden of Sinners light novels are characters who face personal problems with narrow perspectives. Shirou was conceived as an amateur magician to create a strong contrast with the skilled heroes from the visual novel. Nevertheless, Nasu stated that Shirou was a weaker fighter in the Fate route, but the character's magical skills developed significantly in the Unlimited Blade Works storyline beyond the capability of an average person. Initially, Nasu said it is difficult to call Shirou's relationship with Saber a relationship between a man and a woman because after ruling Britain under the pretenses of being a male, she "turned into a girl all of a sudden and fell in love with Shirou". While, Takeuchi on the other hand stated that the relationship is still workable and even realistic as it is part of Saber regaining a part of her humanity that had long been suppressed, which in turn becomes integral to part of Shirou's own growth in understanding both the flaws in Saber's and his own ideals. Shirou and Saber's first meeting, the team of writers included a dream sequence in which the latter's sword, Excalibur, is seen by the former. Since Shirou possessed the scabbard, Avalon, from Excalibur, Nasu wrote this to explain how the two became Master and Servant. Nasu originally had an idea to extend the Fate routes, involving an alternative Fifth Holy Grail War where Shirou fought alongside Saber, but the two did not have a romantic relationship; following their separation, the Shirou of this timeline would end up bonding with Rin in a similar way to how it happened in Unlimited Blade Works's "True Ending", but would still end up becoming the Counter Guardian EMIYA.

Takeuchi described Shirou as a strange character based on his personality. Nasu wrote the younger Shirou as a shy child, whom he deemed fun as he grows up and becomes more straightforward. While the Ufotable Unlimited Blade Works series generated multiple questions regarding Shirou becoming his future self, the warrior Archer. Originally, Shirou's future persona would turn out to be the antagonist Gilgamesh but the staff changed him to Archer. Nasu said that Shirou still has potential to become a Heroic Spirit. Nevertheless, Nasu still intended from the beginning of the making of the novel that both Shirou and Gilgamesh would oppose one another. In the Heaven's Feel route from the original visual novel, he did not specify whether Shirou would become the same Archer. In another interview, Nasu stated that the Unlimited Blade Works kept sending hints that Shirou might become Archer and Rin would be with him to support him emotionally. Shirou's fate in the Heaven's Feel route was left up to the players' interpretation because of Shirou's apparent resurrection.

=== Handling by Ufotable ===
During the production of the anime series Unlimited Blade Works, Ufotable said that they wished to develop Shirou to better fit with other characters in Fate/Zero and the anime's darker tone. Nasu explained that Shirou was made more comical to become a more enjoyable character; this proved to be difficult as his interactions with the other characters were modified, making Nasu feel pressure during the creation of the series. Nevertheless, Ufotable kept the idea of Shirou not being able to smile too much due to his harsh past, with characters telling Shirou that he rarely expresses joy in some episodes. The staff, including series director Takahiro Miura, found this idea fitting. Miura wished the staff to make this Shirou's coming-of-age story; despite this, Nasu stated Shirou does not go through a character arc in the story, which left Miura with a different opinion regarding the character's writing. Miura pointed out that in future work he would prefer to focus more on revealing the character of Shirou as a character rather than women associated with him, which is why the producer Aniplex was firmly established in his choice since the mainline of the arch with Archer based on following the ideals of his father. The CEO of Type-Moon believed that only Nasu himself could convey all the ideas he put into Shirou, help them reflect on the screen correctly and deepen the public perception of the hero.

According to the scriptwriter, the main problem of adaptation was the transfer of the culminating battle between Shirou and Archer, which, due to the great emphasis on the inner thoughts of the heroes, could not be transmitted as clearly as in the source and, according to the creators, would be boring for the audience. For this reason, Nasu independently rewrote the entire course of the battle. In addition, since the format of the visual novel did not set the task to demonstrate the mimic expression of the protagonist's emotions, only during this scene did Nasu realize and prescribe the necessary range of feelings of the protagonist to reflect it during animation. According to Takeuchi, the final meeting between Nasu and Miura for the approval of the scenario of this battle lasted more than five hours. The choice of the epilogue was delayed for three months, and as a result, Nasu decided to write a script for a separate series telling about the future of Shirou and Rin, who went to study in London.

For the release of the first Heaven's Feel film, director Tomonori Sudou said he wanted to explore Shirou and Sakura Matou's past further because he believes their relationship is the most important part of the story. Producer Yuma Takahashi had a similar opinion, feeling some scenes that symbolized the romance between Shirou and Sakura were needed. Ufotable mostly included these scenes; Takahashi believes people might want to watch the film again due to the significance it makes in early scenes. Sakura's Japanese voice actor, Noriko Shitaya, stated that the staff's biggest desire was to show the audience the scenes between Shirou and Sakura, with Sudou wishing to explore how the two met and became close. Aimer's theme song "I Beg You" was written to explore the relationship between these characters as Aimer wants to show Sakura's dark personality as she aims to be loved by Shirou but does not want him to know about her secrets. The author of the printed adaptation of Heaven's Feel noted that for the serialization of the manga he wanted to start the story between Shirou and Sakura with the first time the latter met the former and fell for him in contrast to the original visual novel which left this scene until some scenes more in the route.

For the film Oath Under Snow, singer ChouCho made two songs that focused on the relationship between Shirou and Miyu, who are the center of the plot describing it as heartwarming due to the close bond the siblings have. The song "Kaleidoscope" primarily focuses on Shirou's point of view when first meeting Miyu, and she becomes one of the most important people he has ever met. However, due to the film's plot, the lyrics were written to show darker tone in regards to the development of what happens to the two siblings. While not being a song about Shirou, Choucho states that viewers will find a bigger standing to the character by listening to it.

=== Voice actors ===
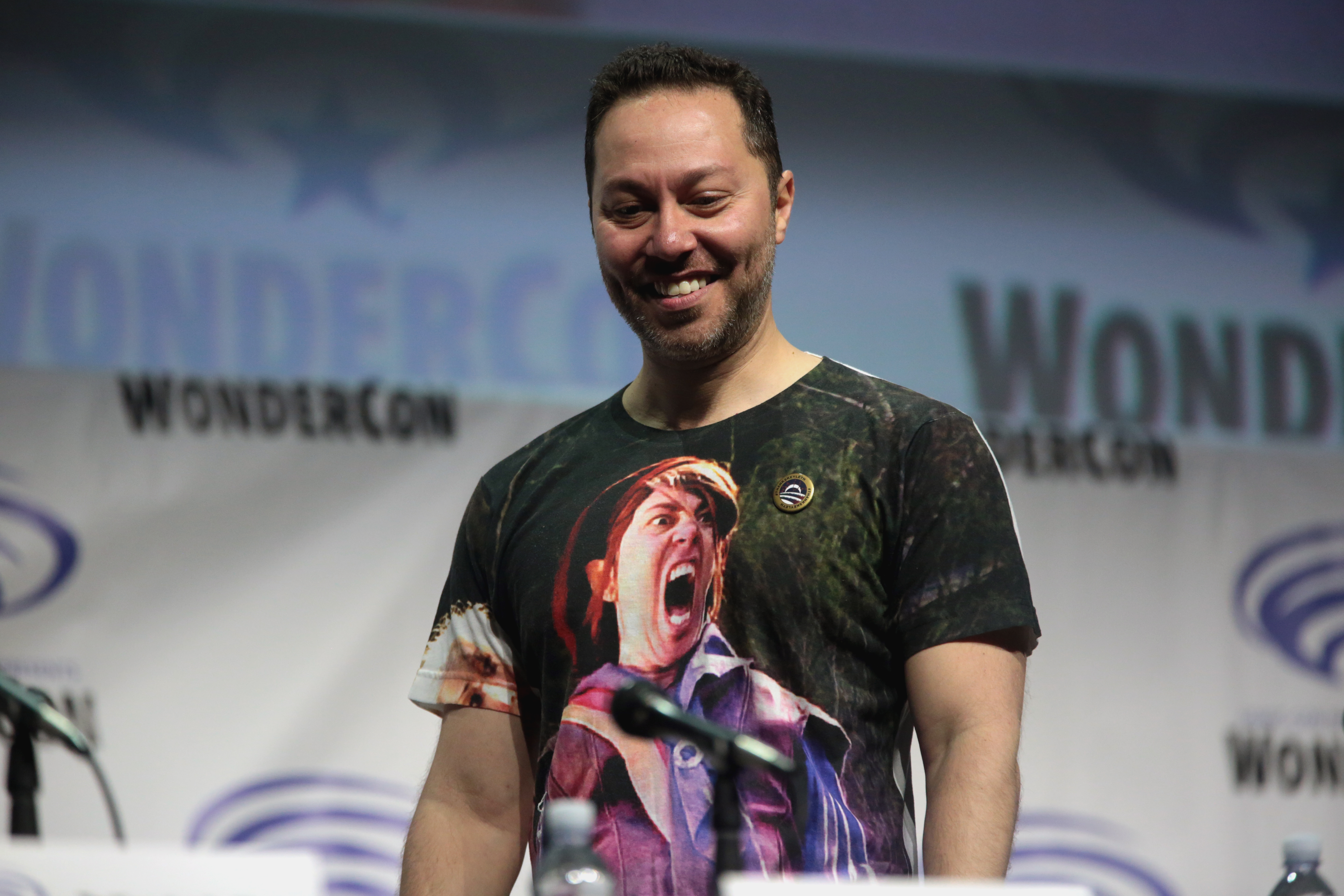
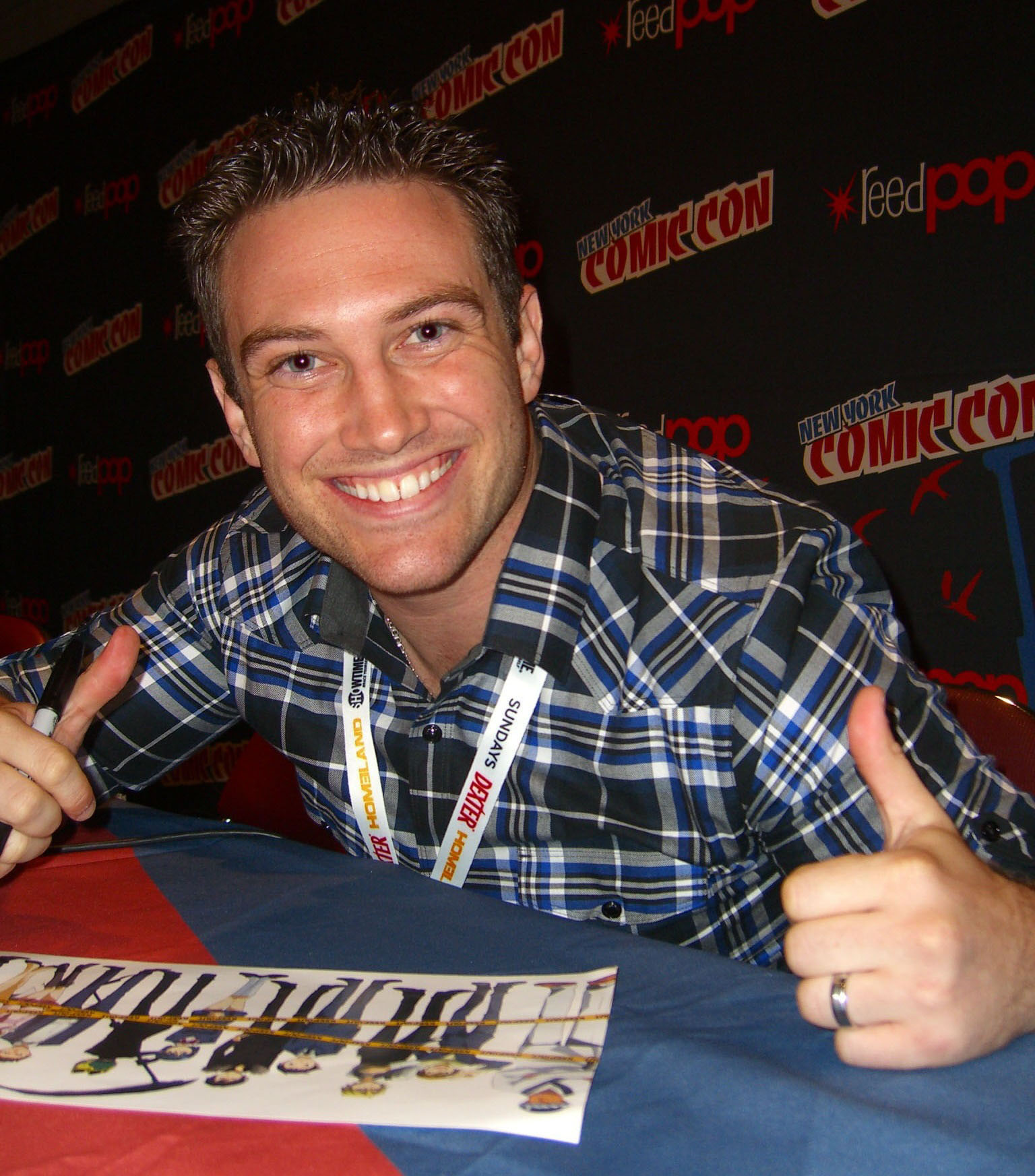
Sam Riegel (left) and Bryce Papenbrook (right) voiced Shirou in the English releases of the Fate franchise.

Shirou is voiced in Japanese by Noriaki Sugiyama, who was surprised by the length of the Fate franchise. Sugiyama noted that they had a certain tension before the beginning of the recording process, since they had not been involved in the Fate series since 2010, they played the same characters only in the comedy works—the series Fate/kaleid liner Prisma Illya and Carnival Phantasm. According to Sugiyama, this forced them to rethink the images of their heroes, although he was glad to return to the "standard Shirou". Sugiyama, on the contrary, stated that recording director Yoshikazu Iwanami forced him for a long time to maintain emotional arousal in his voice. Both actors, Sugiyama and Junichi Suwabe (Archer), since they played the role of the same person, but of different age, in the final season of the series consciously copied the manner and timbre of each other's speech (Sugiyama—bass; Suwabe—baritone) for greater identification of the characters by the audience. During the Unlimited Blade Works, Sugiyama enjoyed his character's confrontations with Archer, mainly because Shirou might become Archer in the future.

Sugiyama once again returned to voice the character in the spin-off movie Oath Under Snow. Kaori Nazuka, who voices Miyu, said her character has a noticeable character arc in these spin-offs due to her growing relationship with Shirou. When asked about his favorite scene from the film, Sugiyama said he preferred the final scene due to Shirou's appealing characterization resulting from the impact Shirou's final line has on Miyu. Hiroyama felt that Shirou's voice contains in this film a bigger sense of security compared to his manga.

Once the Heaven's Feel films started being promoted, Sugiyama said Shirou acted differently due to the different routes the films were taken based on the visual novel. As the films were released, Sugiyama believed Shirou's characterization was far darker compared to the other routes from the visual novel. He found it sad that Shirou loses Saber but is still determined to protect Sakura. He expressed understanding of how Shirou's character was treated in the film, aiming for most of his lines to be done in a cool state. As a child, Shirou is voiced by Junko Noda, who refers to her character as "Chibi Shirou" due to his appearance and like her work in Today's Menu for the Emiya Family when Shirou starts cooking hamburgers.

Sam Riegel was Shirou's first English voice actor, and Mona Marshall voiced Shirou as a child. Patrick Poole voiced the two incarnations of Shirou appearing in Illya's spin-off anime series. English voice actor Bryce Papenbrook felt honored to take Riegel's place for the Unlimited Blade Works series. He stated Riegel's work is "awesome". Papenbrook felt that the story took a "different path in Unlimited Blade Works" and that the creators "wanted a different take on Shirou". He was surprised that series director Tony Oliver chose him to play Shirou. Papenbrook stated that there were moments when Oliver "would explain ... why Shirou was making a certain action or what had been happening surrounding Shirou". Oliver "added so much detail" to Papenbrook's performance; the actor enjoyed "watching it back after" and felt it was "really, really cool to actually see those things that [Oliver] described". He said Oliver wanted him to play Shirou in a "real" way and wished to perceive "the feelings behind" Papenbrook's words. As a result, Papenbrook had to get himself into a "deep mindset".

Papenbrook had watched the first Heaven's Feel film in Japanese before he was told he would work on it. He said he had been "lucky enough to be at a convention with the Japanese actors". He added that while one moment in the film had made the whole audience laugh, he had not understood the reason behind their laughter until it had been explained to him; he comprehended that scene when he viewed it in English. After watching the film in Japanese, he "understood how Shirou should act in that scene". During the recording, he was asked to give Shirou more emotion; he found this challenging because he wanted to avoid expanding Shirou's tone. Papenbrook looked forward to Shirou's role in the Heaven's Feel film because of Shirou being different from the other series, mainly when it came to his relationship with Sakura.

== Characterization and themes ==
Shirou Emiya is a red-haired Japanese high school student. Before the events of the visual novel Fate/stay night, Shirou's parents died in a fire caused by a war between mages known as the Fourth Holy Grail War. Shirou is saved by Kiritsugu Emiya, who then adopts him and teaches basic magic. Before his adoptive father's death, Shirou is informed that Kiritsugu failed to become an "ally of justice," someone who saves as many people as possible. Shirou promises to become one in his stead. Shirou has the desire to fulfill Kiritsugu's goal (referred to as an ideal) becomes his way of life. Through the three routes of Fate/stay night, his opinion of that ideal shifts. He suffers from extreme survivor's guilt and feels disrespectful to the deceased to prioritize his own needs before those of others. He has a distorted sense of values and can only find self-worth in helping others without compensation. Shirou takes Kiritsugu's values of being a hero regardless of being mocked by others who find him hypocritical for not caring about his own life; different routes of the novel make him choose different paths as he interacts with others. While Shirou is only able to perform fundamental magic for his daily life, he later develops the power to project weapons, such as two small twin swords and replicas of other weapons. He is connected with the servant Archer as both can wield the same powers, most notably the extra-dimensional weapons known as Unlimited Blade Works (無限の剣製, Mugen no Kensei), from a dimension in the future, allowing to reach the strength of other servants in a short moment in different routes of the novel's stories. Sugiyama said that "Shirou is a philanthropist in any world. He is a young boy who is wishing for the happiness of those around him." Hiroyama felt that Shirou's voice contains in this film a greater sense of security compared to his manga. For the spin-off Today's Menu for the Emiya Family, Sugiyama was surprised and delighted with Shirou's personality, finding him gentler than in the original series. He tried giving the character a different tone than the ones he used previously.

Japanese pop singer Aimer composed the theme song "Last Stardust", which explores Shirou as the music is displayed in his fight against Archer. The vocals focus on the fire that destroyed Shirou's city while dealing with his acceptance of Kiritsugu's death as he decided to follow his dreams regardless of any regrets he took in his life. This connects with Shirou's future self, Archer, who faced multiple tragedies after becoming a warrior, but Shirou still embraced the pain he would endure in his life instead. Aimer also researched the relationship between Jesus and his disciple Judas Iscariot while handling the relationship between Shirou and Archer with the latter often showing intentions to kill the former, believing he should have never been born; similar words are said between Jesus and Judas.

== Appearances ==
=== In Fate/stay night ===
As the visual novel opens, Shirou lives in a Japanese household from the city of Fuyuki under the guidance of school teacher Taiga Fujimura, years after his father Kiritsugu died. One night at school, he witnesses a duel between warriors Archer and Lancer; the latter ambushes and kills Shirou. Using her magic, Archer's master, Rin Tohsaka, manages to revive Shirou. When Lancer attacks him again, Shirou accidentally summons the servant Saber who drives Lancer away. Saber swears to protect him from any danger. After allying with Rin, Shirou learns of the Fifth Holy Grail War, a conflict between multiple servants and masters who seek to obtain the Holy Grail. Shirou agrees to join the conflict to prevent further catastrophes being caused by other masters.

==== Fate route ====
In the Fate route, Shirou learns that Saber is a female King Arthur. King Arthur blames herself for the fall of Britain. This unwavering ideal serves as a juxtaposition to Shirou's; although they believe that their respective goals are unreachable, both continue along their journey. While fighting a servant named Berserker, Shirou passes all of his energy to Saber to create a replica of Caliburn, the sword in the stone which chooses the rightful king of England which the pair wield together to kill their enemy. Shirou then adopts Berserker's master, Illyasviel von Einzbern, who is revealed to be Kiritsugu's daughter. Shirou learns that Kiritsugu was Saber's previous master, and that Excalibur's scabbard, Avalon: The Everdistant Utopia (全て遠き理想郷, Subete Tōki Risōkyō), was hidden inside his body to protect him from enemies. Shirou and Saber prepare for final fight against Kirei Kotomine and his servant, Gilgamesh, who intend to sacrifice Illya to create the Grail. Before this, Shirou returns Avalon to Saber so that she can fight with Excalibur's full strength. Shirou and Saber win their fights by accessing Avalon's full power together, after which Saber returns to a past version of Camelot, where she passes away. In the PlayStation 2 remake, an extra ending was added, in which Shirou and Saber reunite on Avalon Island following their deaths.

==== Unlimited Blade Works route ====
In the Unlimited Blade Works route, Rin chastises Shirou for his ideal of becoming an ally of justice. Her servant is a future version of Shirou—Archer—who has suffered greatly from this ideal. Archer seeks to kill his younger self in the hope of erasing his own existence or at least erasing the idea of being an ally of justice from Shirou's world. During a battle, Shirou learns of Archer's true identity. The two are also locked in an ideological conflict, with Archer criticizing Shirou for borrowing his ideal from his adoptive father and Shirou vowing never to become Archer. Although he refuses to give up his ideal entirely, Shirou works toward a compromise in which he will strive for fulfilling it despite knowing that it is borrowed. After Shirou wins his fight against Archer, he faces and defeats Gilgamesh, while Rin and Saber destroy the Grail created from the late Illya. In the Good ending, Saber does not fade away after destroying the Grail, and Shirou stays with Saber and Rin in the Emiya household. In the True ending, Shirou travels to London to live with Rin and study magic in the Mage's Association at the Clock Tower.

==== Heaven's Feel route ====
In the Heaven's Feel route, Shirou realizes that his schoolmate Sakura Matou is a mage who unwillingly turns into a black shadow every night to kill townspeople. He faces a dilemma: he can either uphold his ideal by killing Sakura, saving lives in the process, or he can forsake his ideal to save her. He chooses to abandon his ideal and become Sakura's ally, also becoming Rider's master. During a fight, Shirou's left arm is cut off and replaced with Archer's. It is too powerful for an ordinary human to wield; its use would eventually result in Shirou's death. While fighting corrupted versions of Saber and Berserker created by Sakura's Shadow, Shirou absorbs the arm's power, beginning the process of his mind and body breaking down. He then projects Berserker's own axe-sword to his self-made technique, Nine Lives Blade Works: The Shooting Hundred Heads (是・射殺す百頭（ナインライブズ・ブレイドワークス, Nain Raibuzu Bureido Wākusu), and kill Berserker. With Rider's aid, Shirou defeats Saber, and he and Rin purge the Shadow from Sakura. He stays behind to destroy the Greater Grail but is confronted by Kirei, whom Shirou defeats. In the Normal ending, Shirou sacrifices himself to destroy the Greater Grail. In the True ending, Illya sacrifices herself to close the Greater Grail and save Shirou from dying to his arm's effects. He then lives peacefully with Sakura.

=== In Fate/hollow ataraxia ===
In the sequel Fate/hollow ataraxia, Shirou meets Bazett Fraga McRemitz, a member of the Mages' Association and a master in the Fifth Holy Grail War. Both Shirou and Bazett find themselves in a four-day time loop that begins on the fourth day of the Fifth Holy Grail War. Each time they die or survive four days, they awaken on the first day of the loop, aware of what has happened to them since the first time since it began. Determined to end the sequence, Shirou, Bazett, and Avenger fight to discover the truth behind the endless four days. Shirou experiences changes in personality and momentary memory lapses. It is later revealed that Shirou is connected to Avenger, causing them to switch places when the night falls, implying that Avenger is either hiding in Shirou's body. Once Shirou discovers the truth, he becomes conflicted; he wants to end the loop, while Avenger wants to live out his days. It is revealed that Avenger created and possessed a replica of Shirou to fulfil his desires, trapping that replica in the four-day time loop. Meanwhile, the real Shirou was still present in the real world. More than half a year had passed after the events of the Fifth Holy Grail War. Once Avenger ends the loop, he discovers the anomaly in spacetime continuum which caused the endless four-day cycle; it was caused by Rin's use of a copy of Zelretch's Jeweled Sword, which Rin had obtained with the help of Shirou and Illya six months after the War. Avenger then erases the memories of all the present people in the time loop world, including Shirou. The only people who know what occurred are Bazett, Caren, Illya, and Caster. In the epilogue, the true Shirou is tricked into allowing Bazett and Caren stay at the Emiya household.

=== Appearances in other media ===
==== Manga and anime ====
Hiroshi Hiroyama originally wanted Shirou to wear fewer clothes while using the Archer card but settled to have only his right arm uncovered.

Shirou has appeared in the anime and manga versions of Fate/stay night, the film Unlimited Blade Works (2010), and the Heaven's Feel films. Scenes from the original visual novel that show Shirou having sexual intercourse with the heroines are commonly censored. The Unlimited Blade Works anime series added a new scene where a person is seen walking in Archer's dimension following the final credits. This generated many questions from fans in regards to Shirou's destiny but Kinoko Nasu remained ambiguous about whether that person was Shirou or not.

Shirou is a minor character in the spin-off manga series Fate/kaleid liner Prisma Illya, in which he lives as a normal teenager with Illya's mother, Irisviel von Einzbern. An alternate version of the character from a parallel world appears in the sequel Fate/kaleid liner Prisma Illya 3rei!!; Shirou is imprisoned by the Ainsworth family. He asks Illya to look after his sister, Miyu Edelfelt. Shirou is later freed from the prison by Gilgamesh and joins the fight against Miyu's enemies, the Ainsworths, using his magic techniques that weaken his body. Shirou is able to defeat Angelica Ainsworths but is nearly killed by a doll of Sakura Matou controlled by Julian Ainsworth. Following his recovery, Shirou reunites with Miyu, and they go back to their home while explaining to their allies what they know about the enemies.

The manga and the anime film Fate/Kaleid Liner Prisma Illya: Vow in the Snow (2017) show the origins of the parallel world's Shirou; the adopted son of Kiritsugu and the foster brother of Miyu, Shirou decided to take care of Miyu following Kiritsugu's death. As the two grew closer as siblings, Julian kidnaps Miyu. Guided by Kirei Kotomine, Shirou decides to take part in the Holy Grail War to protect Miyu from being used as a sacrifice by the Ainsworths. When Shinji Matou's reanimated corpse kills Sakura for trying to protect Shirou, she leaves an "Archer card" that grants Shirou the powers of his future heroic persona, Archer. After avenging Sakura, Shirou fights the enemies that threaten his sister during the Holy Grail War and wins the conflict. Using the cards, Shirou transports Miyu to another world and then confronts Angelica. Although Shirou loses the final fight which leads to his imprisonment, he is satisfied with his sister's safety. After Shirou tells Illya his and Miyu's past, he makes peace with Angelica who becomes whom he becomes attracted. However, he is forced to abandon the battlefield when Illya and Miyu note that Archer's powers as they are consuming his spirit. However, when Sakura's doll is about to kill Rin, Shirou returns to fight, using his last magic attack to take her down and restore her mind.

Shirou briefly appears in the light novel Fate/Zero, the prequel of Fate/stay night, in which he is saved by Kiritsugu at the end of the series from a fire. After Kiritsugu's death, Shirou decides to follow his guardian's dreams of being a hero. Shirou also makes minor appearances in the novel Fate/Apocrypha, in which his hometown was not destroyed by the fire of the Fourth Holy Grail War. He, along with other characters from Type-Moon, appears in the 2011 anime Carnival Phantasm. He is also the main character of the manga Today's Menu for the Emiya Family, in which Shirou's peaceful life is shown alongside those of the other characters.

==== Video games and CD dramas ====
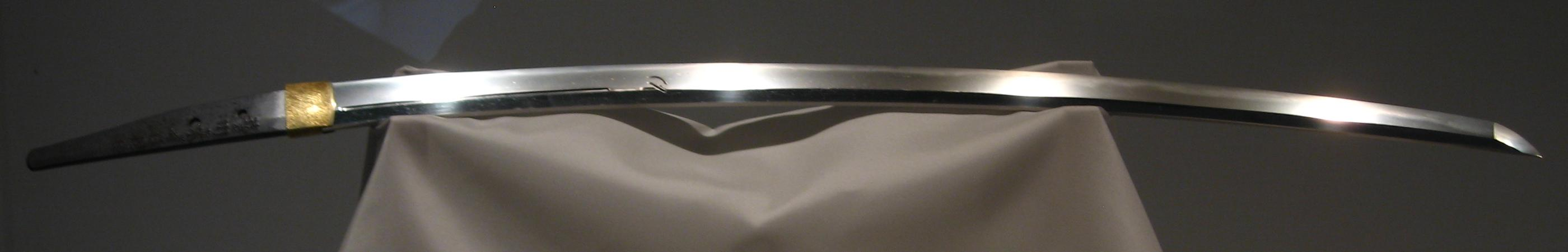
Muramasa (勢州桑名住村正) from the Tokyo National Museum

In the role-playing game Fate/Grand Order, Shirou appears as a "pseudo" Servant under the name Senji Muramasa (千子村正), a spirit that wonders about his vessel's persona. Muramasa wields demonic swords, including Tsumugari Muramasa (都牟刈村正) and Myoujingiri Muramasa (明神切村正; lit. "cutting gods and demons Muramasa"), but is not certain about their success. This incarnation of Shirou reappears in the manga adaptation by Wataru Rei.

Shirou also appears in the Fate/Extra timeline of the Fate franchise; he is one of the few playable Servants in this game as well as its sequel, Fate/Extra CCC. There, Shirou's future personas Archer originate from his future, adult No Name (無銘, mumei; lit. "Nameless") persona, rather than visual novel protagonist.

Shirou appears in the fighting games Fate/unlimited codes, and Fate/tiger colosseum. Besides Type-Moon's works and adaptations, Shirou also appears in the video game Divine Gate. He is also present alongside Rin as a playable character in the side game Capsule Servant, as well as in the mobile phone game Hortensia Saga to promote the anime adaptations. A character CD focused on Shirou was released in 2007. A drama CD exploring Shirou's life with Kiritsugu and Fujimura as he deals with his trauma resulting from the fire and Kiritsugu's tutelage in basic magic was released. In promoting the animated adaptations of the routes, Shirou was added to the games Summons Board, Red Stone, and Puzzle & Dragons.

Shirou (as Archer) also appears in Honkai: Star Rail as 5-star Quantum character following the Path of the Hunt, alongside special event “Sweet Dreams and the Holy Grail”.

== Cultural impact ==
=== Popularity ===
In promoting Vow in the Snow, Takashi Takeuchi drew his take on Hiroshi Hiroyama's Shirou Emiya.

Merchandise, including rubber straps and figures, have been modeled after Shirou, including replicas of his twin swords. In 2017, a café based on Fate characters including Shirou was opened in Osaka, Japan. To promote the film Vow in the Snow, Takashi Takeuchi created a poster of Hiroshi Hiroyama's take on Shirou, which was offered to viewers in Japan. Hiroyama responded to this promotion enthusiastically. In promoting the Heaven's Feel films, Shirou's school uniform was recreated for the usage of cosplayers, while his image was later used as part of a Valentine's Day event.

Shirou has been popular with fans of the series, often ranking in polls from Type Moon and Newtype. Outside of the franchise, Shirou has appeared in other anime polls. He took eighth place in the category "best male character" from a 2015 preliminary poll conducted by the magazine Newtype. In March 2018, he took fourth spot for his role in the first Heaven's Feel film. In a poll containing male anime characters conducted by Anime News Network, he took both the 9th and 10th spots. In a poll by Anime! Anime!, Shirou was voted as one of the male character fans wanted to have as their younger brother. In a Newtype poll, Shirou was voted the eighth-most-popular male anime character from the 2010s. In the March 2019 issue from the magazine, Shirou took the first spot for his role in the second Heaven's Feel film. In a Manga.Tokyo poll from 2018, Shirou was voted as the second most popular Fate character behind Saber. Anime News Network cited Shirou and Archer's fight scene from the Unlimited Blade Works television series as one of the best sword fights in anime due to handling of both characters in terms of similarities and how they use similar techniques. Shirou's Muramasa persona from Fate Grand Order is also popular within Japanese player.

According to EpicStream, Shirou and Archer's Unlimited Blade Works was referenced by the manga Jujutsu Kaisen in February 2024 where one fighter named Yuta Okkotsu used a similar spell to summon hundred of swords and used them in battle against Ryomen Sukuna.

=== Critical reception ===
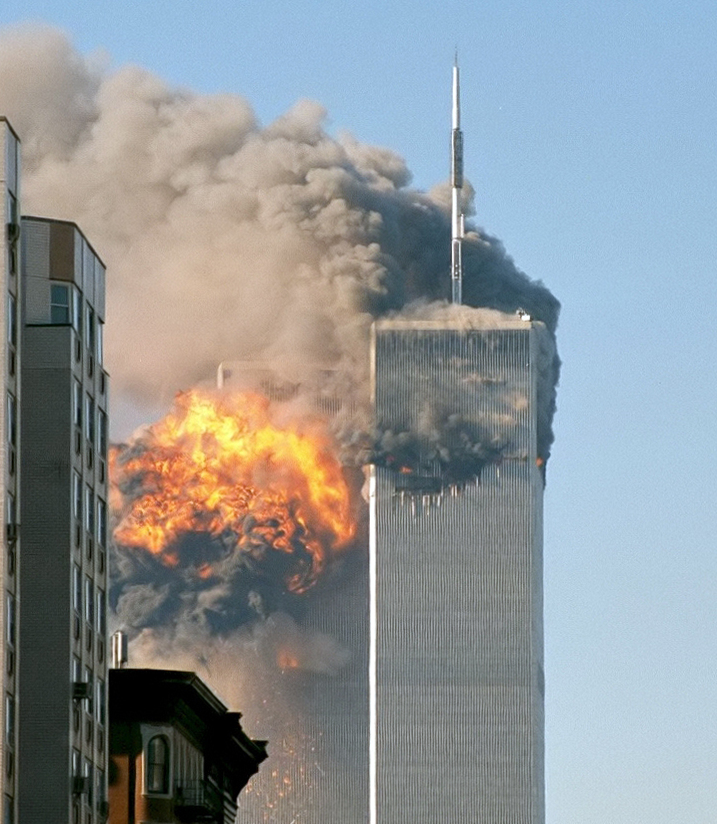
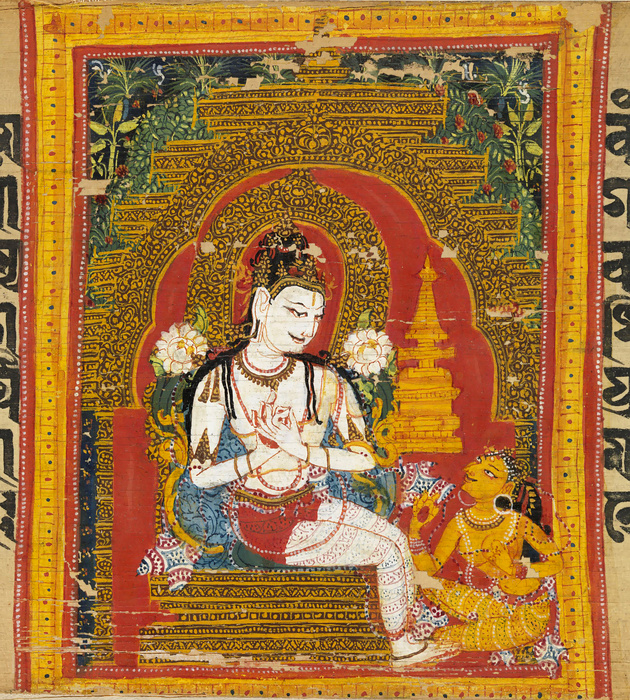
Shirou's past has been linked with the September 11 attacks with the character surpassing his trauma of the destruction of his home across the visual novel through his ideals compared with those of Mahayana Buddhism.

The main character in each of the story arches was placed in different conditions, which allowed readers to understand the circumstances of the setting ("Fate"), to conduct a theoretical understanding of the ideals of the character ("Unlimited Blade Works"), to face the problems of their implementation ("Heaven's Feel") and, having combined this, to understand the details of his image. Gamsutra added that the player's in-game choices dramatically alter Shirou's character arcs and allow Nasu to convey a different aspect of his ideal. In his analysis of the magical system and details of the personalities of the characters, Makoto Kuroda sees in the idea of Shirou to become a “champion of justice” a direct analogy with the traditional view of the life of bodhisattvas in Mahayana Buddhism, seeking to save other people at the cost of their own efforts and suffering. In Kuroda's view, Buddhist concepts are opposed to the elements of Christian ethics contained in the plot through the opposition of Shirou and Kirei Kotomine in the form of the main character's rejection of the interpretation of Angra Mainyu as a creature who accepted the sins of others in the name of salvation. Similarly, novelist Shūsei Sakagami praised the way the player can witness Shirou's "gradual change from a robot to becoming a human" through the three routes. Uno Tsunehiro from Kyoto University compared his traumatic background to survivors from the September 11 attacks while also showing different ways the Japanese society used to take care of their lives in such time. As a result, Tsunehiro views Shirou's change in each route as a way to recover from the trauma, grow up and become an independent person.

Shirou's characterization has attracted critical commentary. Reviewers considered Shirou's behavior and his attitude to his own ideals as the most interesting and well-developed part of the whole novel. Gamasutra and Manga.Tokyo said his childish ideals of becoming a hero and the continuation of this goal while growing up make him an interesting protagonist. Writer Gen Urobuchi wrote that the relationship between Shirou and Rin is more appealing than his relationship with Saber, describing them as a more realistic couple. In contrast, both Nasu and Takeuchi however state that the relationship between Shirou and Saber are more appealing and still functions as a realistic one even if it is the relationship between two soulmates. Urobuchi enjoyed the way Shirou and Sakura's romantic relationship is handled due to the emotional support Shirou offers to the lonely Sakura. Rice Digital claimed the sexual scenes were given a deep theme, as Shirou was not aggressive towards his love interest in either route and remains as a more mature character instead. According to Anime News Network, in the visual novel's first animated series, Shirou demonstrates depth because he is less pacifistic and has become a more philosophical fighter than in previous appearances. THEM Anime Reviews was more critical of Shirou's personality, calling him a "complete idiot" due to the number of times he is placed in danger. Makoto Kuroda of Wayo Women's University describes Shirou's actions towards Saber as neglect of a person's primordial survival instincts and as encompassing "selfless philanthropism and a purely boundless sense of moralism". Some reviewers commented on Shirou's relationship with Saber and on his growth in Studio Deen's anime that improves their personalities and adds romance to their relationship as the plot progresses.

Reviewers' comments on Shirou's role in the various films and television series have been mostly positive. Mania Entertainment's Chris Beveridge liked the development of Saber during the series, particularly her team-ups with Shirou. He made similar comments about the romantic relationship between Saber and Shirou, with DVDTalk finding them as the most appealing relationship within not just the series and franchise, but in all gaming and anime.

The Fandom Post and Blu-ray enjoyed Shirou's characterization in the film, in which his ideals contrast with those of Archer and Kiritsugu, making him notably mature in the story. Both voice actor Kana Ueda and ReelRundown said Unlimited Blade Works makes him interesting as the character's depths are further explored. Sequart Organization noted that while Archer hates his past self because of the regrets he had when he was Shirou, he makes peace with his decisions. An Anime News Network reviewer praised his fights in the film. Blu-Ray enjoyed the and praised the development of the animosity between Shirou and Archer during the film. Chris Beveridge of The Fandom Post praised the protagonist's battle against Gilgamesh because of Gilgamesh's antagonistic role in Fate/Zero giving the narrative closure. Josh Tolentino of Japanator found Shirou's decision to become a tragic warrior despite his knowledge about this future uncommon in storytelling. However, Beveridge was not to keen with Shirou and Rin’s relationship stating that it came off is too passive-aggressive, with Rin constantly talking down on Shirou and being incredibly controlling, preferring Shirou and Saber’s relationship over the one he has with Rin.

Shirou's characterization was changed for the Heaven's Feel movies. Anime News Network said he shows facial expressions that give his scenes a bigger impact on viewers rather than relying of dialogue. Two writers from The Fandom Post were divided on whether Shirou is as engaging in these films as in Unlimited Blade Works, although his posttraumatic stress disorder was noted to explore a deeper part of his past. Martin Butler of UK Anime Network found Shirou "rather bland". Some reviewers praised his interactions with Sakura and called their relationship one of the most enjoyable romances in the franchise. The second film was noticed for making Shirou take one of the hardest decisions he ever could as it protecting Sakura would contradict his dreams of becoming a hero he took from Kiritsugu.

Beside the main Fate series, critics focused on his spin-off incarnations. During his debut in Fate/kaleid liner Prisma Illya 3rei!!, Shirou earned praise from Thanasis Karavasilis of MANGA.TOKYO, who said his heroic actions make his first appearance the highlight of the episode. His role in the fighting scenes in the series were well received by Karavasilis, but he received criticism for being overpowered. For the film Oath Under Snow, response to Shirou's protection over Miyu were received positive response, while his characterization also earned praise despite similarities with previous incarnations. Otaku USA praised him in Today's Menu for the Emiya Family because the character's cooking is presented in a positive way despite his similarities with the archetypes of action series in the previous works. In another review, the writer enjoyed the way this original net animation (ONA) handled the relationship between Shirou and Kiritsugu, which is only briefly shown in other works from the franchise.
