= Noriaki Sugiyama =

Japanese voice actor and narrator

- 杉山 紀彰
- Born: March 9 Tokyo, Japan
- Occupations: Voice actor; narrator
- Years active: 1999–present
- Agent: Stay-Luck
- Notable work: Bleach as Uryū Ishida; Naruto as Sasuke Uchiha; Fate as Shirō Emiya; Norn9 as Akito Shukuri; Hetalia: Axis Powers as England
- Height: 168 cm (5 ft 6 in)

Noriaki Sugiyama (杉山 紀彰, Sugiyama Noriaki) is a Japanese voice actor and narrator. He voiced Uryū Ishida in Bleach, England in Hetalia: Axis Powers, Sasuke Uchiha in Naruto, and Shirō Emiya in the Fate franchise.

== Filmography ==
=== Anime ===
2002

- Naruto (Sasuke Uchiha)
- Beyblade: V-Force (Blader DJ)
- Mirage of Blaze (Additional voice)

2003

- Beyblade G Revolution (Blader DJ)
- Full Metal Panic? Fumoffu (Crewman)
- Dark Shell (Fukushima)

2004

- Bleach (Uryū Ishida)

2005

- The Law of Ueki (Ancho Kabara)
- Kamichu! (Inu-Oshu/dog priest)
- Hell Girl (Mamoru Hanagasa)
- Fushigiboshi no Futagohime Gyu! (Hills)
- Damekko Dōbutsu (Usahara)

2006

- The Story of Saiunkoku (Shōrin, Sânta)
- Code Geass: Lelouch of the Rebellion (Rivalz Cardemonde, Kento Sugiyama)
- Fate/stay night (Shirō Emiya)
- Gintama (Sniper Kame)

2007

- Toward the Terra (Tony)
- Ōkiku Furikabutte (Junta Takase)
- Naruto: Shippuden (Sasuke Uchiha)
- Koutetsu Sangokushi (Chouun Shiryuu)
- Moyashimon (Takuma Kawahama)

2008

- Black Butler (William T. Spears)
- Code Geass: Lelouch of the Rebellion R2 (Rivalz Cardemonde, Kento Sugiyama)

2009

- Hetalia: Axis Powers (England)
- Metal Fight Beyblade (Blader DJ)

2010

- Hetalia: World Series (England)
- Metal Fight Beyblade Baku (Blader DJ)
- Shukufuku no Campanella (Aberdeen Roland)
- Stitch! ~Zutto Saikō no Tomodachi~ (Wishy-Washy, Slushy, Student A)
- Black Butler II (William T. Spears)

2011

- Metal Fight Beyblade 4D (Blader DJ)
- Cardfight!! Vanguard (Katsumi Morikawa)
- Carnival Phantasm (Shirō Emiya)
- Nyanpire (Masamunya Dokuganryu)

2012

- Moyasimon Returns (Takuma Kawahama)
- Kimi to Boku. 2 (Akihiro)
- Hagure Yuusha no Estetica (Phil Barnett)

2013

- Hetalia: The Beautiful World (England)
- Fate/kaleid liner Prisma Illya (Shirō Emiya)
- Hakkenden: Eight Dogs of the East (Seiran)
- Meganebu! (William Satou)

2014

- Fate/kaleid liner Prisma Illya 2wei! (Shirō Emiya)
- Fate/stay night Unlimited Blade Works (Shirō Emiya)
- Kamigami no Asobi (Thor Megingjard)
- Francesca: Girls be ambitious (Ishikawa Takuboku)
- Hozuki's Coolheadedness (Goban)
- Sengoku Basara Judge End (Ōtomo Sōrin)
- Black Butler Book of Circus (William T. Spears)

2015

- Hetalia: The World Twinkle (England)
- Blood Blockade Battlefront (DJ Fango)
- Fate/stay night: Unlimited Blade Works 2nd Season (Shirō Emiya)
- Fate/kaleid liner Prisma Illya 2wei! Herz! (Shirō Emiya)

2016

- Norn9 (Shukuri Akito)
- Fate/kaleid liner Prisma Illya 3rei! (Shirō Emiya)
- D.Gray-man Hallow (Arystar Krory III)
- ReLIFE (Akira Inukai)
- Maho Girls PreCure! (Orba)

2017

- Boruto: Naruto Next Generations (Sasuke Uchiha)
- Spiritpact (Intetsu)
- One Piece (Vinsmoke Ichiji)
- Clean Freak! Aoyama-kun (Gaku Ishikawa)
- Hell Girl: The Fourth Twilight (Mamoru Hanagasa)

2018

- Kakuriyo: Bed and Breakfast for Spirits (Hakkabou)
- Butlers: Chitose Momotose Monogatari (Takashi Mikuni)
- Spiritpact (Intetsu)
- Hinomaru Sumo (Jin Yomoda)

2019

- Mob Psycho 100 (Ryo Shimazaki)
- Wise Man's Grandchild (Lawrence)
- Actors: Songs Connection (Keishi Harumoto)

2020

- Bofuri (Kuromu)

2021

- Hetalia: World Stars (England)

2022

- The Case Study of Vanitas (Loki Oriflamme)
- Bleach: Thousand-Year Blood War (Uryū Ishida)

2023

- Bofuri 2nd Season (Kuromu)
- Demon Slayer: Kimetsu no Yaiba (Muichiro's father)

2024

- Red Cat Ramen (Sasaki)
- The Blue Wolves of Mibu (Inoue Genzaburō)

2025

- Promise of Wizard (Nero)

2026

- The Cat and the Dragon (Haibuchi)
- Steel Ball Run: JoJo's Bizarre Adventure (Oyecomova)^{Ep. 5 credits}

=== Original video animation ===
- Sentō Yōsei Yukikaze (2002) (Ito)
- Carnival Phantasm (2011) (Shirō Emiya)
- Naruto Shippūden: Sunny Side Battle!!! (2014) (Sasuke Uchiha)

=== Anime films ===
- Naruto the Movie: Ninja Clash in the Land of Snow (2004) (Sasuke Uchiha)
- Bleach: Memories of Nobody (2006) (Uryū Ishida)
- Bleach: The DiamondDust Rebellion (2007) (Uryū Ishida)
- Naruto Shippuden the Movie: Bonds (2008) (Sasuke Uchiha)
- Axis Powers – Paint it, White! (2010) (England)
- Beyblade: Sol Blaze, the Scorching Hot Invader (2010) (Blader DJ)
- Bleach: Hell Verse (2010) (Uyrū Ishida)
- Heart no Kuni no Alice (2011) (Boris Airay)
- 009 Re:Cyborg (2012) (008)
- Road to Ninja: Naruto the Movie (2012) (Sasuke Uchiha)
- The Last: Naruto the Movie (2014) (Sasuke Uchiha)
- Boruto: Naruto the Movie (2015) (Sasuke Uchiha)
- Black Butler: Book of the Atlantic (2017) (William T. Spears)
- Fate/kaleid liner Prisma Illya: Oath Under Snow (2017) (Shirō Emiya)
- Fate/stay night: Heaven's Feel (2017–2020) (Shirō Emiya)

=== Video games ===
2003–present

- Naruto games (Sasuke Uchiha)

2005–present

- Bleach games (Uryū Ishida)

2004

- Riviera: The Promised Land (Hector)

2005

- Duel Savior (Taiga)

2006

- Imouto flag (Suzumori Taichi)

2007

- Imouto route (Suzumori Taichi)
- Shōnen Onmyōji (Abe no Masachika)
- Hakarena Heart ~Ta ga Tame ni Kimi wa Aru~ (Hanyuu Ryouya)
- Alice in the Country of Hearts (Boris Airay)
- Fate/stay night Realta Nua (Shirō Emiya)
- Fate/tiger colosseum (Shirō Emiya)
- Magician's Academy (Professor Sagami)

2008

- Infinite Undiscovery (Kiriya)
- Twinkle Crusaders (Virus)
- Fate/tiger colosseum Upper (Shirō Emiya)
- Fate/Unlimited Codes (Shirō Emiya)

2009

- Atelier Annie: Alchemists of Sera Island (Hans Arlens)
- Arcobaleno (Basilio Graziani)
- Imouto wife (Suzumori Taichi)
- Ellvarier (Raven)
- Starry☆Sky 〜in Autumn〜 (Takuya Nashimoto)
- Date ni Game Tsui Wake Jane! (Saul)
- Danzai no Maria (Mikagami Shuurei, Zakariel)
- Final Fantasy Crystal Chronicles: The Crystal Bearers (Keiss)
- Fate/unlimited Codes Portable (Shirō Emiya)
- MagnaCarta II (Crocell)
- Million KNights Vermilion (Sven)
- Moyasimon DS (Takuma Kawahama)

2010

- Ar tonelico III (Aoto)
- Clock Zero (Toranosuke Saionji/Traitor)
- Shukufuku no Campanella Portable (Aberdeen Roland)
- Starry☆Sky 〜in Autumn〜 Portable (Takuya Nashimoto)
- Sengoku Basara 3 (Ōtomo Sōrin)
- Tartaros (Lucius)
- Beyblade: Metal Fusion (Blader DJ)
- Last Escort -Club Katze- (Johan)
- White Album 2 (Hayasaka Chikashi)

2011

- Okashi na Shima no Peter Pan ~Sweet Never Land~ (Tink Bell)
- Gakuen Hetalia Portable (England)
- Clock Zero Portable (Toranosuke Saionji/Traitor)
- Starry☆Sky 〜After Autumn〜 Portable (Takuya Nashimoto)
- Sengoku Basara 3: Utage (Ōtomo Sōrin)
- Tsugi no Giseisha o Oshirase Shimasu (Kashizawa)
- Nazowaku Yakata Oto no aida ni aida ni (Parokku Homes)
- Beyond the Future – Fix the Time Arrows (Holo)
- Omerta ~Chinmoku ni Okite~ (Ugajin Ken)

2012

- Atelier Ayesha (Ernie Lyttelton)
- Gakuen Hetalia DS (England)
- Shinobazu Seven (Genki Tounosawa)
- Hana Awase Mizuchi Hen (Utsutsu, Ime)
- Hitofuta Kitan (Futatsuo)
- Yamikara no Izanai Tenebrae I (Tenji)

2013

- Cardfight!! Vanguard: Ride to Victory!! (Katsumi Morikawa)
- Kamigami no Asobi (Thor Megingjard)
- The Guided Fate Paradox (Rakiel Ljuin)
- Conception II: Children of the Seven Stars (Alexi)
- JoJo's Bizarre Adventure: All Star Battle (Bruno Bucciarati)
- Rage of Bahamut (Noah, Avenging Soul)
- Shiratsuyu no Kai (Kanda Chiaki)
- Danzai no Maria Complete Edition (Mikagami Shuurei, Zakariel)
- Snow Bound Land (Demon)
- NORN9 (Shukuri Akito)
- Princess Arthur (Medraut)

2014

- Ayakashi Gohan (Hana Suou)
- Muramasa Rebirth (Seikichi)
- Kuroyuki hime -Snow Black- (Dune Baxter)
- Kuroyuki hime -Snow Magic- (Dune Baxter)
- J-Stars Victory VS (Sasuke Uchiha)
- Sengoku Basara 4 (Ōtomo Sōrin)
- Norn9 Var Commons (Shukuri Akito)
- Bakumatsu Rock (Yataro Iwasaki)
- Fate/Hollow Ataraxia (Shirō Emiya)
- Fate/kaleid liner Prisma Illya (Shirō Emiya)
- Holy Breaker! (Hida Kaishou)
- Mermaid Gosick (Basil Adilworth)

2015

- Elsword (Ciel)
- Kamigami no Asobi InFinite (Thor Megingjard)
- Fate/Grand Order (Muramasa)
- Clock Zero ExTime (Toranosuke Saionji/Traitor)
- JoJo's Bizarre Adventure: Eyes of Heaven (Bruno Bucciarati)
- Sengoku Basara 4: Sumeragi (Ōtomo Sōrin)
- Norn9 Last Era (Shukuri Akito)
- Luminous Arc Infinity (Elvio)
- Yunohana Spring (Katsuragi Naomasa)

2016

- Hana Awase Karakurenai/Utsutsu Hen (Utsutsu, Ime)
- Yunohana Spring 〜Cherishing Time〜 (Katsuragi Naomasa)
- SA7 -Silent Ability Seven- (Crawforo Takami)
- Kyoukai no Shirayuki (Kaine Kumishima)
- Black Rose Valkyrie (Cielo)
- Sengoku Basara: Sanada Yukimura-Den (Ōtomo Sōrin)
- Norn9 Act Tune (Shukuri Akito)
- 100 Sleeping Princes & the Kingdom of Dreams (Volker)
- Watch Dogs 2 (Wrench)

2017

- The Witch and the Hundred Knight 2 (Theodur)
- Onmyōji (Abe no Seimei, Kuro Seimei)
- Code: Realize − Silver Miracles (Aiguille)
- CARAVAN STORIES (Piet)
- Final Heroes (Zoro)
- Dissidia Final Fantasy: Opera Omnia (Zell Dincht)

2018

- LibraryCross∞ (Shukuri Akito, Katsuragi Naomasa)
- The Alchemist Code (Yuto)
- Granblue Fantasy (Krelkulkil)

2019

- Jump Force (Sasuke Uchiha)
- Final Fantasy XV: Episode Ardyn (Young Verstael Besithia)
- One Piece Treasure Cruise (Vinsmoke Ichiji)
- Mahoutsukai no Yakusoku (Nero)

2020

- Disney: Twisted-Wonderland (Grim)
- Crash Bandicoot 4: It's About Time (Ika Ika)

2021

- Fate/Grand Order (Senji Muramasa)

2022

- Tactics Ogre: Reborn (Vyce Bozeck)

2023

- Ikemen Villains (Harrison Gray)

2024

Naraka Bladepoint: Liyam Liu

- Genshin Impact (Kinich)

2025

- One Piece Bounty Rush (Vinsmoke Ichiji)

=== Drama CD ===
- Amemakura (Genki)
- Exit Tunes Presents ACTORS (Harumoto Keishi)
- Girl's Therapist Case 1 (Amagishi Kira)
- Haikagura (Tekkai)
- Hetalia: Axis Powers Drama CD (England)
- Hetalia: Axis Powers Hitsuji De Oyasumi Vol. 15 (England)
- Hikaru Ga Chikyuu Ni Ita Koro
- Koezaru Wa Akai Hana (Naran)
- Love Presenter
- Love Trip (Sasaki)
- ONE x 3 (Aoitsuki Saki)
- Renai Jōtō Ikemen Gakuen (Tatsumi Ryoji)
- Road to Charasuke (Sasuke Uchiha)
- Ryūnohanawazurai
- Sengoku Soine (Date)
- Sono Ai Wa Yamai Ni Itaru (Mamiya Kanoe)
- Tsundere Darling
- Vanquish Brothers (Kenshin)
- Yours For An Hour (Aki Tsukikage)
- Romantic Joutou (Ekihito)

=== Tokusatsu ===
- Zyuden Sentai Kyoryuger (Debo Tangosekku)
- Zyuden Sentai Kyoryuger Returns: Hundred Years After (Debo Harudamonne)

=== Dubbing ===
==== Live-action ====
- Bring It On (Les) (Huntley Ritter)
- The Bronze (Ben Lawfort) (Thomas Middleditch)
- Day Watch (Yegor) (Dmitry Martynov)
- Final Destination 5 (Sam Lawton) (Nicholas D'Agosto)
- Footloose (Ren McCormack) (Kenny Wormald)
- Ghost World (Josh) (Brad Renfro)
- Love Island (Carrington Rodriguez)
- Outlander (Roger Wakefield) (Richard Rankin)
- Slaughterhouse Rulez (Don Wallace) (Finn Cole)

==== Animation ====
- Ben 10: Alien Force (Kevin Levin)
- Foster's Home for Imaginary Friends (Blooregard "Bloo" Q. Kazoo)
- Phineas and Ferb (Buford Van Stomm, Roger Doofenshmirtz, Captain Bob Webber)
- Hamster & Gretel (Lyle / FistPuncher)
- Welcome to Eltingville (Pete DiNunzio)
- 13 Reasons Why (Clay Jensen (Dylan Minnette))
- 24 (Rick Allen)
- Mighty Morphin Power Rangers (Billy Cranston, Lizzinator, Doomstone)
- JeruZalem (Kevin Reed (Yon Tumarkin))
- The Open House (Logan Wallace) (Dylan Minnette)
- Synchronicity (Jim Beale (Chad McKnight))
- Batman: The Brave and the Bold (Dove)
- D.I.C.E. (Robert Clapice)
- Hey Arnold! (Stinky Peterson)
- Justice League (Ray Thompson)
- The Mr. Men Show (Mr. Happy)
- Recess (Jerome and Chucko)
- Transformers: Prime (Cliffjumper)

== Discography ==
Aside from his work as a voice actor, he has also released his own single, entitled 'Fragment,' in addition to a mini-album, 'On The Way.' Notably, soon after its release on July 29, 2009, his character image CD as England in the popular series Hetalia: Axis Powers debuted at 2nd place in the Oricon Singles Chart.

=== Character image tracks ===
- Bleach
  - "Suigintou no Yoru"
  - "Quincy no Hokori ni Kakete"
  - "Aesthetics and Identity" (along with Masakazu Morita)
  - "Chu-Bura"
- Naruto
  - "Scenario"
  - "Kimimonogatari"
- Hetalia: Axis Powers
  - "Absolutely Invincible British Gentleman"
  - "Pub and GO!"
  - "England's Demon Summoning Song"
  - "Let's Enjoy Today"
  - "My Friend"
  - "In the Bluebell Woods"
  - "Marukaite Chikyuu" (England version)
  - "Hatafutte Parade" (England version)
  - "Mawaru Chikyuu Rondo" (England version)
  - "Hetalian☆Jet" (England version)
  - "Fantastic World"
- Kuroshitsuji
  - "Kairitsu no Dorei"
  - "Shinigami no Kintai Kanri"
- Fate/Stay Night
  - "Kogane no Hikari"
- Alice in the Country of Hearts
  - "Close Distance"
  - "Popular Lover"
  - "1WEEK Kitchen"
- NORN9 Norn + Nonette Cantare Vol.3
  - "Mie Nai Kusari"
- Hana Awase
  - "Aoki Akatsuki"
  - "Hana Awase"
  - "Mugen no Kanade"
  - "Tsuki Oboro"
  - "Genso ni Tsumugu Hikari de"
  - "Midare Sakura"
- Last Escort -Club Katze-
  - "Melody"
- Exorcism of Maria
  - "Anata to Chikai no Shokutaku ni"
- Absolutely Invincible English Gentleman (Axis Powers Hetalia)
- Aesthetics and Identity (Bleach)
- Anata to Chikai no Shokutaki ni (Danzai no Maria)
- Aoki Akatsuki (Hana Awase)
- British Jet (Axis Powers Hetalia)
- Christmas on the Silk Road
- Chu-Bura (Bleach)
- Days (Shinobazu Seven)
- Easter (On the Way)
- England's Evil Demon Summoning Song (Axis Powers Hetalia)
- England's Marukaite Chikyuu (Axis Powers Hetalia)
- Fragment (On the Way)
- In the Bluebell Woods (Axis Powers Hetalia)
- Mienai Kusari (Norn9)
- Kairitsu no Dorei (Kuroshitsuji)
- Kimimonogatari (Naruto)
- Kogane no Hikari (Fate)
- Let's Enjoy Today! (Axis Powers Hetalia)
- Melody (Last Escort Club Katze)
- Midare Sakura (Hana Awase)
- Mugen no Sou (Hana Awase)
- My Friend (Axis Powers Hetalia)
- New Days (On the Way)
- Popular Lover (Heart no Kuni no Alice)
- Pub and GO!!! (Axis Powers Hetalia)
- Quincy no Hokori ni Kakete (Bleach)
- Seesaw Game (Kamigami no Asobi)
- STAINLESS NIGHT (Stigmata II)
- Scenario (Naruto)
- Shinigami no Kintai Kanri (Kuroshitsuji)
- Shinzou Democracy (Actors 4)
- Suigintou no Yoru (Bleach)
- Tashika na Yozora ni (On the Way)
- Time Passed By (On the Way)
- Twinkle Step (Boyfriend Kari)
- UNITED NATIONS STAR (Axis Powers Hetalia)
- WA WA WA! World Ondo (Axis Powers Hetalia)
- Yorimichi wa Nagaku (Heart no Kuni no Alice)
- Fantastic World (Axis Powers Hetalia)

-->
