= Fate/stay tune =

- Cover art of Fate/stay tune Unlimited Radio Works
- Other names: Fate/stay tune -URW-
- Genre: Streaming
- Running time: 3–4 minutes (episode average); 30–60 minutes (CD)
- Country of origin: Japan
- Home station: Animate TV
- Hosted by: Kana Ueda; Ayako Kawasumi; Junichi Suwabe
- Created by: Type-Moon
- Original release: February 22 – September 6, 2007; October 2009 – April 2010 (URW)
- No. of episodes: 28; 27 (URW)
- Website: https://web.archive.org/web/20070927212237/http://www.animate.tv/digital/web_radio/detail_093.html

Fate/stay tune (フェイト/ステイ チューン, Feito/sutei chūn) was a Japanese talk show and internet radio program produced by Type-Moon. The series was broadcast on the internet radio station Onsen, distributed to Animate TV. Twenty-eight broadcasts were released online from February 22, 2007, to September 6, 2007. The show was hosted by Ayako Kawasumi and Kana Ueda, both voice actors for the Fate series. A radio show titled Fate/stay tune UNLIMITED RADIO WORKS was broadcast for the promotion of the Fate/stay night: Unlimited Blade Works theatrical film. It was streamed from October 2009 to April 2010, and hosted by Junichi Suwabe and Ueda.

== Format ==
Fate/stay tune was hosted by three voice actors: Ayako Kawasumi, Kana Ueda, and Junichi Suwabe. The episodes of Fate/stay tune and Fate/stay tune UNLIMITED RADIO WORKS were distributed onto Animate Times (previously known as Animate TV), and hosted on the internet radio station Onsen. They were split into two volumes in radio CD format, and released through Frontier Works. The volumes of Fate/stay tune would be released between August and October 2007, while UNLIMITED RADIO WORKS' volumes were released between March and May 2010, respectively.

== Broadcast history ==
=== 2007 ===
The broadcasting for Fate/stay tune radio program was first announced in 2007, with it being distributed to Animate TV in February 2007, and broadcast on Onsen in March 2007.

=== 2010 ===
The 22nd broadcast titled "Become a Japanese person who can say no (Д)" was released on March 19, 2010, and ran for about 3 minutes. It focused on Suwabe, who wanted to go cherry blossom viewing, but suffers from hay fever and is looking for places where he can enjoy cherry blossoms indoors. The 23rd broadcast was released on March 26, 2010, and focused on the characters coming up with various tie-in products with Fate. The 24th broadcast was released on April 2, 2010, and focused on the graduation of Kawasumi.
