= Fate/Unlimited Codes =

2008 arcade video game

- Arcade flyer featuring Saber (top) and Archer (bottom)
- Developers: Type-Moon (original concept); Cavia (planner); Eighting (developer)
- Publisher: Capcom
- Composers: Masaharu Iwata; Manabu Namiki; Mitsuhiro Kaneda; Kimihiro Abe; Azusa Chiba; Noriyuki Kamikura; Yoshimi Kudo
- Series: Fate
- Engine: RenderWare
- Platforms: Arcade, PlayStation 2, PlayStation Portable
- Release: Arcade: JP: June 11, 2008; PlayStation 2: JP: December 18, 2008; PlayStation Portable: JP: June 18, 2009; NA: September 3, 2009; EU: September 10, 2009
- Genre: Fighting game
- Modes: Single-player, multiplayer
- Arcade system: Namco System 246

Fate/Unlimited Codes (Note: Japanese: フェイト／アンリミテッドコード, Hepburn: Feito/Anrimiteddo Kōdo) is a fighting game developed by Eighting and published by Capcom. It was first released on June 11, 2008 for the Namco System 246 arcade system in Japan, later receiving a port to the PlayStation 2 in December 2008. An enhanced port for the PlayStation Portable would be released on June 18, 2009 in Japan. The game was subsequently localized and released digitally for the PlayStation Store in North America and Europe in September 2009, and later delisted in May 2012.

Based on the visual novel Fate/Stay Night, players are given the option to play as each of the characters during battles. Japanese author Kinoko Nasu and other Type-Moon staff members worked alongside the developers to retell its events in the form of fights as seen between mages known as Masters and spirits known as Servants. Fate/Unlimited Codes marks the first appearance of the Servant Saber Lily based on a design from Saber used in the visual novel during its Unlimited Blade Works storyline.

Fate/Unlimited Codes was conceived by the Fate series' creators Takashi Takeuchi and Kinoko Nasu amid the preparation of release for Fate/Stay Night. They wanted to differentiate it from the main entries and settled on a fighting game, inspired by Capcom's third-person shooter Gotcha Force. The soundtrack for the game was composed by multiple composers—including Masaharu Iwata and Manabu Namiki, and Hitoshi Sakimoto, using his sound production studio Basiscape.

The game was met with mixed reviews. Critics were divided on the gameplay; some praised the balanced gameplay, while others criticized its presentation as it may confuse players new to the franchise. It was also often compared to Namco Bandai's Soulcalibur: Broken Destiny. Commercially, Fate/Unlimited Codes had sold about 34,000 copies within its first week of release.

== Gameplay ==
A duel between two characters, the Fate franchise's main protagonist, Shirou Emiya (left) and Assassin (right)

Fate/Unlimited Codes is a fighting game, which is based on duel where players can utilize a combination of different moves to damage their opponent. They can also conduct a series of battles up to two or three; depending on the value set by the player. The time limit of rounds are either limited or unlimited, depending on the player's settings. Points are used statistically to calculate a player's success in certain modes. Character attacks are manageable by using a customizable three-button gamepad system; with the fourth being used to cancel block enemy attacks and combinations. When using attack buttons, two types of energy scales are present—magic energy and the Holy Grail's energy. The scale of magical energy is divided into three cells, allowing the players to enhance and supplement the standard types of attacks.

The accumulation of the energy of the Holy Grail occurs simultaneously for both opponents and opens up the possibility of using "super receptions", which consumes magical energy. The strength and type of super-reception varies depending on the amount of magical energy expended to activate it. Some of the characters (Kotomine, Bazett and Rin) also have a limited and unrecoverable number of special items needed to conduct unique remote attacks. There are four levels of difficulty that can be adjusted between matches.

== Development ==
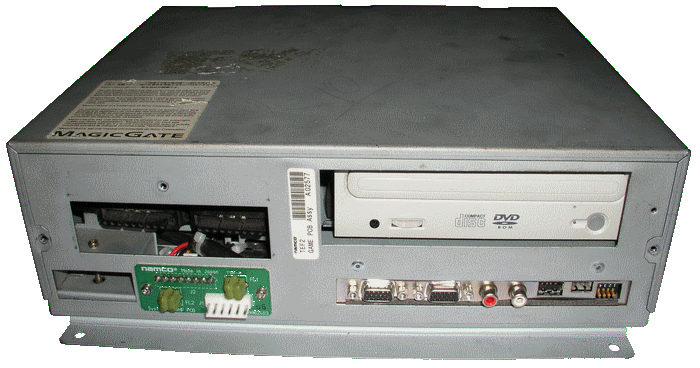
Fate/Unlimited Codes was originally released for the Namco System 246 arcade system (pictured) in Japan on June 11, 2008.

Fate/Unlimited Codes originated from Japanese illustrator Takashi Takeuchi's desire to create a fighting game based on the narrative of Fate/Stay Night. In late 2003, during the preparations for the release of Fate/Stay Night Takeuchi, along with author Kinoko Nasu, had taken inspiration from Capcom's third-person shooter Gotcha Force, designed by Ryuuji Higurashi. Under the impression of the gameplay of Fate/Unlimited Codes, Capcom took up the idea of translating the basic principles of Fate/Stay Night into a fighting game. In September 2007, Type-Moon and Japanese video game developer Cavia, with support from Capcom, had released the comedy-fighting gameFate/tiger colosseum in the chibi art style.

Takeuchi had redesigned Rin for Fate/Unlimited Codes, with the idea of creating a more mature look.

All the companies planned a new game scenario of the same genre for the Namco System 246 arcade gaming machines, followed by a port to the PlayStation 2. Kazuhiro Tsuchiya was appointed producer by Type-Moon, and Takeuchi had personally supervised the project. Cavia was later forced to cut staff and temporarily suspend the development of all new projects due to bankruptcy. The materials of Fate/Unlimited Codes were later transferred to the Japanese video game developer Eighting. Yuki Tagava had become the lead programmer for the project, while Nobuyuki Irie was the designer of 3D models, and Naoto Naruse was approved as the head developer. Basis of the gameplay was based on the abilities of the characters of the original visual novel, called “noble fantasies” (Jpn. 宝: Takara), which are the skills of the “servant” characters activated by magical energy. For the rest of the characters who did not possess “noble phantasms”, these blows were invented taking into account the specifics of each character formulated in the original sources. The upper limit of damage for all super moves to create a game balance was set to be the same for all characters. The simulated locations of the visual novel were used as arenas for battles. Each character's storyline script was written by Nasu, although Takeuchi later admitted that due to numerous simplifications regarding the original source, these stories may be considered inferior among fans of the Fate universe.

Higurashi was later invited to be a graphic character designer in Fate/Unlimited Codes. Higurashi, along with Takeuchi and other Type-Moon employees, completed all the graphic materials of the future game, in strict accordance with the stylistic features of the Fate/Stay Night design. Saber Lily's character was originally created by Takeuchi, as an alternative costume for Saber, based on the visual novel's Unlimited Blade Works story arcade dress, and got its name because of the similarity of color and shape of the dress to the white lily. After the release of the game on the arcade machines, Saber Lily received a lot of positive feedback from fans and, unlike the game costumes of other characters, while porting the game to the PlayStation 2, she had her own name displayed in the match interface. Originally it was planned to include the character only in a limited edition of the game, but later it was added to the standard version. Between May and June 2012, Capcom USA discontinued the game for sale on the PlayStation Store due to an expired digital license.

=== Audio ===
The soundtrack to Fate/Unlimited Codes was written by returning composer Hitoshi Sakimoto. Sound effects were handled by Sakimoto alongside various other composers: Masaharu Iwata, Manabu Namiki, Noriyuki Kamikura, Mitsuhiro Kaneda, Kimihiro Abe, Azusa Chiba, and Yoshimi Kudo, in his sound production studio Basiscape. Sakimoto's score incorporated elements of multiple genres: modern electronic, rock, and ambient. It also includes new musical compositions and rearrangements of the original tracks from the Fate/Stay Night visual novel. The opening song is "code" by singer Sachi Tainaka, which was later released as a single.

=== Release history ===
Fate/Unlimited Codes was first released as an fighting game for the Namco System 246 arcade system, on June 11, 2008 in Japan. Type-Moon would port the game to the PlayStation 2 in December 2008. An enhanced version for the PlayStation Portable was released on June 18, 2009, alongside a digital release on the PlayStation Store in North America and Europe in September 2009.

== Reception ==
Reception

Aggregate score
Aggregator	Score
Metacritic	PSP: 72/100

Review scores
Publication	Score
1Up.com	B-
Famitsu	7/10, 7/10, 7/10, 7/10 (PS2)
GamePro	3/5
GameSpot	7/10
IGN	8.2/10
Official U.S. PlayStation Magazine	4/5
PlayStation LifeStyle	6/10

Upon release, Fate/Unlimited Codes received "mixed or average" reviews from video game publications based on the review aggregate website Metacritic aimed towards the PlayStation Portable (PSP) port. The PSP port sold 34,000 units in Japan within its first week of release.

Much of the focus within reviews involved positive feedback in regards to special effects and animation. While reception of the game's graphic component was often mixed, with Country of the Games' Evgeny Zakirov noting the use of a low-poly grid for character modeling, which, according to MeriStation's William van Dijk, required player habituation. Zakirov considered this flaw "uncritical" for the PSP version. Van Dijk felt that the game's graphics were far behind Soulcalibur: Broken Destiny and Dissidia Final Fantasy. Writing for PlayStation Illustrated, Matt Henchy called the character's faces “curves”. Zakirov and van Dijk outlined the use of cel-shading animation, which allowed “to create a correspondence to the spirit of the original source”. Anime News Network's reviewer Todd Ciolek compared the game's "discreet" character design to the Guilty Gear series. Most critics, in addition to this, emphasized the detailing of the costumes of each of the characters, as well as the elaboration and diversity of animation and special effects. Carolyn Petit of GameSpot felt the views used in Fate/unlimited codes diversified the overall visual range. While Matt Henchy discussed the good quality of the background images used in the cut scenes, and explained his preference for an animated in-game video.

The main advantage of Fate/Unlimited Codes observers called the created combat system and various combinations of strikes. According to Dijk, although the gameplay of this fighting game did not introduce any innovations from the point of view of the genre, the resulting combo system turned out to be "unique" and "high-level". Reviewers outlined the ease of learning the basics of the game, as well as the convenience and ease of management, which makes it understandable to beginners of the genre. The game was recognized as well-balanced by the strength of individual characters, which was realized due to the difference in speed and predominant type of attacks between strong and weak fighters. Observers have noted that the abilities of each character correspond to his skills in the visual novel and different originality. requiring the player to develop strategies for the use of individual techniques for a particular opponent. Among the game modes, observers mainly singled out “Missions”, which were well suited, in their opinion, for teaching various combat techniques. A large number of in-game achievements have been recognized as contributing to replayability. However, Yevgeny Zakirov considered the mini-games in additional missions completed “not as interesting as in Street Fighter IV.

The use of Japanese dubbing in the localized English version received universal acclaim: some observers singled out this fact as an advantage emphasizing the connection with Fate/Stay Night. Others considered it a flaw, affecting the difficulties of understanding the plot. However, the Japanese voice track was unanimously recognized for its high quality. Opinions differed in assessing the background sound track, which differed from the perception of it as "pleasant", "diverse", and "complementary".

Western critics had also pointed out spelling errors in the localized version, the impossibility of acquiring the game on the Universal Media Disc, the reduction of hero skills as compared to the PS2 version, and the perceived "high" price of the PlayStation Network release. Fate/Unlimited Codes was often considered inferior in visual design compared to Soulcalibur: Broken Destiny. Todd Siolek called it "one of the best adaptations of anime to the fighting game genre". According to William van Dijk and Carolyn Petit, the game was an example of “a good balance between simplicity and depth of gameplay”, and also “knew how to use its own advantages”. IGN's Ryan Clements called its gameplay more interesting than Soulcalibur: Broken Destiny".
