= Fate/Stay Night: Heaven's Feel =

Japanese anime film series produced by Ufotable

- Promotional poster for the first film featuring Sakura Matou

Fate/Stay Night [Heaven's Feel]
- Created by: Kinoko Nasu; Type-Moon
- Anime film

Fate/Stay Night: Heaven's Feel I. Presage Flower
- Directed by: Tomonori Sudō
- Produced by: Hikaru Kondo; Atsuhiro Iwakami; Tomotaka Takeuchi
- Written by: Akira Hiyama
- Music by: Yuki Kajiura
- Studio: Ufotable
- Licensed by: AUS: Madman Entertainment; NA: Aniplex of America; UK: MVM Films
- Released: October 14, 2017
- Runtime: 120 minutes
- Anime film

Fate/Stay Night: Heaven's Feel II. Lost Butterfly
- Directed by: Tomonori Sudō
- Produced by: Hikaru Kondo; Atsuhiro Iwakami; Tomotaka Takeuchi
- Written by: Akira Hiyama
- Music by: Yuki Kajiura
- Studio: Ufotable
- Licensed by: AUS: Madman Entertainment; NA: Aniplex of America; UK: MVM Films
- Released: January 12, 2019
- Runtime: 117 minutes
- Anime film

Fate/Stay Night: Heaven's Feel III. Spring Song
- Directed by: Tomonori Sudō
- Produced by: Hikaru Kondo; Atsuhiro Iwakami; Tomotaka Takeuchi
- Written by: Akira Hiyama
- Music by: Yuki Kajiura
- Studio: Ufotable
- Licensed by: AUS: Madman Entertainment; NA: Aniplex of America; UK: MVM Films
- Released: August 15, 2020
- Runtime: 122 minutes

Fate/Stay Night: Heaven's Feel (stylized as Fate/stay night: Heaven's Feel) is a Japanese urban fantasy anime film trilogy produced by Ufotable, directed by Tomonori Sudō, written by Akira Hiyama, and featuring music by Yuki Kajiura. The trilogy adapts Heaven's Feel, the third and final route of the Fate/Stay Night visual novel. It focuses on high school students Shirou Emiya and Sakura Matou who are affected by a conflict between mages known as the Holy Grail War.

The first film in the trilogy, titled Presage Flower premiered in Japan on October 14, 2017, and premiered in the United States between November and December 2017. Its English dub premiered on June 5 and June 7, 2018, in the United States.

The second film, titled Lost Butterfly premiered in Japan on January 12, 2019. Aniplex of America released the film in the United States in March 2019.

The third and final film in the trilogy, titled Spring Song, premiered in Japan on August 15, 2020, and premiered in the United States on November 18 of the same year.

It is the fourth anime adaptation of Type-Moon's works by Ufotable, following The Garden of Sinners film series, the Fate/Zero television series, and the Fate/Stay Night: Unlimited Blade Works television series and also the fourth anime adaptation of the Fate/Stay Night visual novel, after Studio Deen's adaptations Fate/Stay Night, a television series, and Fate/Stay Night: Unlimited Blade Works, a movie; and Ufotable's adaptation Fate/Stay Night: Unlimited Blade Works. The trilogy also is the first anime adaptation of the Heaven's Feel route.

== Plot ==
=== Part 1 – Presage Flower ===
Shirou Emiya, an amateur mage, has been dragged into the Fifth Holy Grail War, a fight to the death among seven mages and their Servants, familiars who are legendary figures from all eras.

Shirou is determined to win the Holy Grail War to save the world and be a hero of justice, as well keep his friend, Sakura Matou, safe from the war and her abusive brother, Shinji Matou, with the help of his Servant, Saber, and his classmate, Rin Tohsaka. Strange occurrences start happening in the war, and Sakura comes down with a mysterious sickness.

=== Part 2 – Lost Butterfly ===
Despite having lost the war and Saber, Shirou finds himself unable to stop participating in the Holy Grail War. As Sakura is revealed to be a Master in the Holy Grail War, Shirou is determined to keep her safe.

As Sakura starts succumbing to her mysterious illness, and the mysterious shadow keeps killing people, Shirou and Rin are determined to finish the Holy Grail War.

=== Part 3 – Spring Song ===
As Sakura becomes possessed by the shadow, Shirou risks his own body and mind to save her by stopping the tainted Holy Grail, facing his now-corrupted Servant Saber in the process.

Allying with the wayward priest Kirei Kotomine, fellow competitor Illyasviel von Einzbern and Sakura's displaced Servant Rider, Shirou and Rin enter a race against time to rescue Sakura from madness and end the Holy Grail War once and for all—before the corrupted Grail can bring about the end of the world.

== Cast ==
=== Main characters ===
Shirou Emiya (衛宮 士郎, Emiya Shirō)
Voiced by: Noriaki Sugiyama (Japanese); Bryce Papenbrook (English)
The main character of the trilogy and Saber's master. Shirō is a survivor of the Fourth Holy Grail War and was adopted by the magus Kiritsugu Emiya, whom Shirō wants to follow in the footsteps of by becoming a hero of justice. As the story progresses, he falls in love with his friend Sakura and, after learning of her past, ultimately forsakes his ideals to protect her—despite the risk she poses to Fuyuki. He later bonds with Illya and loses his left arm while protecting her from the Shadow, resulting in the dying Archer transplanting his arm to save him. After Sakura falls to the Shadow's influence, Shirō risks self-destruction by using Archer's arm to defeat the corrupted Berserker and enlisting the help of Kirei Kotomine to protect Illya. He then helps Rin and Illya recreate a weapon that can defeat Sakura, the Jeweled Sword Zelretch. After reaffirming his desire to save Sakura, he forms a temporary pact with Rider to defeat his now-corrupted former Servant, Saber Alter, by combining Archer's Rho Aias shield with Rider's Bellerophon. Shirō remorsefully eliminates Saber Alter before freeing Sakura from the shadow with Caster's Rule Breaker and facing the near-dead Kirei as his final opponent in a brutal fistfight. While Shirō defeats Kirei, he hesitates to destroy the grail after realizing he now fears to die, wishing to reunite with Sakura. Ultimately, he is saved at the last moment by Illya—who reveals herself as Kiritsugu's daughter and, by extension, Shirou's adoptive older sister—and tearfully watches her sacrifice herself to stop the grail, saving him in the process by transferring his soul out of his dying body. After Rider recovered Shirō's soul, Rin and Sakura transplant it into an artificial body, effectively reviving Shirō.

Sakura Matou (間桐 桜, Matō Sakura)
Voiced by: Noriko Shitaya (Japanese); Cristina Vee (English)
The main heroine and the driving force of the story. She is Shirō's longtime friend and the true master of Rider. She has been visiting his home very frequently since they met and helps him with housework, especially when it comes to cooking. Sakura endures an abusive relationship with her brother, even though she tries to hide it. She is later revealed to be Rin's younger sister, given to the Matō family by Rin's father as magi families are only allowed one heir each. Zōken then converted her into an artificial Grail Vessel, meant to subvert Heaven's Feel system—and unwittingly connecting her to the corruption in the Grail, which manifests through her as an entity called "the Shadow". She eventually becomes Shirō's lover, but as her sanity erodes, she tries to protect him by leaving. After snapping and killing Shinji, the Shadow corrupts and fuses with her, driving her to kidnap Illya for use as a grail vessel until Kirei and Shirō intervene. Nearly killing Kirei after he mocks her sufferings, Sakura is driven away by the debilitating pain of absorbing Berserker after Shirō defeats him. She later crushes Zōken's true crest-worm after ripping it out of her body when he tries to possess her and devours True Assassin with the Shadow, influenced by the Grail—possessed by the evil spirit Angra Mainyu—towards wiping out humanity. Eventually confronted by her sister Rin, Sakura states her intent to take revenge on Rin for never rescuing her from the Matō family, revealing a long-repressed resentment for Rin being beloved by others while Sakura was always abused. However, to Sakura's panic, Rin manages to best her with the Jeweled Sword Zelretch—only for Rin to spare her at the last moment while sustaining severe injury. Shocked and distraught by Rin's apology for never knowing about or saving Sakura from her torment, Sakura breaks free of the Shadow's influence long enough for Shirō to arrive; despite pleading for him to escape so she can take Angra Mainyu down with her death, Shirō states she has to live on to make up for what she's done and reaffirms his love for her, severing her connection to the Shadow and finally freeing her from Angra Mainyu. Carried to safety along with Rin by Rider, Sakura later helps transfer Shirō's soul to a new body after Illya splits it from his old one to save him, finally finding happiness for herself as she and Shirō resume their relationship.

Rider (ライダー, Raida)
Voiced by: Yuu Asakawa (Japanese); Melissa Fahn (English)
Rider is the Servant protagonist in Heaven's Feel, much as Archer was for Unlimited Blade Works and Saber was in Fate. She is Shinji's Servant, summoned to fight for him in the Fifth Holy Grail War. Rider bonds with Sakura and seeks to protect her from her abusive family. Rider's identity is Medusa—the Gorgon monster of Greek myth, who unwittingly killed her sisters after being driven mad by a curse from the Olympian Gods—and that she empathizes with Sakura for also being made a monster against her will. After Sakura is revealed as her true master, Shinji permanently loses his contract with her, and Rider exclusively defends Sakura. She later moves into the Emiya household with Sakura, acting as its guardian in place of Saber, and gradually starts trusting Shirō. Eventually becoming the only surviving Servant outside Zōken's control, Rider is ordered by Sakura's final Command Spell to protect Shirō before Sakura succumbs to the Shadow, saving Shirō from Zōken's insects but refusing to fight Sakura directly out of loyalty to her. After Shirō reaffirms his pledge to save Sakura, Rider agrees to follow him for the duration of the war and entrusts him with bringing Sakura's salvation. Confronting the corrupted Saber Alter, Rider pushes herself to the limit by using her Mystic Eyes of Petrification and Noble Phantasm Bellerophon combined with Shirō's Rho Aias barrier-shield counter Saber Alter's Excalibur Morgan. After recovering from the fight, Rider evacuates a wounded Rin and the now-freed Sakura to safety. Shirō stays to stop the grail, later returning to find Shirō's soul had been salvaged by Illya at the last moment. Following the war, Rider—now able to pass for a normal human with special glasses to seal her eye's powers—remains incarnated and maintained by Sakura's mana, living alongside her with Shirō at his home.

Illyasviel von Einzbern (イリヤスフィール・フォン・アインツベルン, Iriyasufīru fon Aintsuberun)
Voiced by: Mai Kadowaki (Japanese); Stephanie Sheh (English)
The secondary heroine. She is one of the seven participants of the Fifth Holy Grail War and the master of Berserker. She plays a vital role in the war as Einzbern's representative. She is ultimately revealed to be the biological daughter of Kiritsugu Emiya—Shirō's adoptive father—whom she resentfully believes had abandoned her to raise a new family in Shirō. At first, Illya appears to be an enemy to Shirō and Rin but later becomes very close to the former, forming a sibling-like bond with him. Following the destruction of her castle and the loss of Berserker, Illya takes shelter with Shirō and Sakura. Eventually, Illya overhears Taiga talking about Kiritsugu and realizes he tried to rescue her before he died, allowing her to finally forgive him. After Sakura becomes corrupted, Illya is again kidnapped on Zōken's orders but is saved by Kirei and Shirō, though is dismayed to find her Servant Berserker has also been corrupted to the point he does not recognize her anymore. After Shirō severely reduces his lifespan using Archer's arm to stop Berserker, Illya combines her powers with Rin's to access the recorded memories of Illya's genetic template and original Grail Vessel, Justeaze Lizrich von Einzbern, so that Shirō can see an image of the Jeweled Sword Zelretch for him to copy. After Shirō frees Sakura from the Shadow and defeats Kirei, Illya intervenes before he destroys the Grail himself. Revealing herself as Kiritsugu's actual child, Illya states her intent to protect Shirō as his older sister and sacrifices her life to complete the Heaven's Feel Ritual, destroying the Grail and separating Shirō's soul from his dying body to save him. Illya briefly meets her mother's soul, Irisviel, in her last moments before peacefully fading away.

Rin Tohsaka (遠坂 凛, Tōsaka Rin)
Voiced by: Kana Ueda (Japanese); Mela Lee (English)
Rin is a model student and idol of Shirō's school. She is one of the seven participants of the Fifth Holy Grail War, being the master of Archer. Even though she starts as an adversary, Rin is Shirō's most prominent ally during the story, as both the one to revive him from Lancer's deathblow and the one who introduces him to the magus world. Rin and Sakura tend to keep an eye on each other from afar because they are sisters, but Rin was unaware of the Matō family's abuse until she raided their home in search of Zouken. Eventually, Sakura's unstable state makes Rin consider executing her as a mercy-killing and to protect Fuyuki. When Shirō refuses to let Sakura die, Rin briefly dissolves their alliance but is forced to rejoin after losing Archer to the Shadow. After the Shadow overtakes Sakura, Rin joins Shirō, Illya, and Rider to stop her rampage. Combining her powers with Shirō and Illya to replicate the Jeweled Sword Zelretch, Rin confronts her sister directly while Shirō and Rider battle against Saber Alter, besting the shocked Sakura by using the Jeweled Sword's nearly-inexhaustible magic reserves to cut down the latter's shadows—however, Rin hesitates to kill Sakura at the last second and is severely injured when the latter lashes out in panic. Embracing Sakura, Rin admits her love for her sister alongside her regret for never knowing about or saving her from her plights, voicing happiness about Sakura keeping the hair ribbon she gave her before passing out. After being rescued along with Sakura by Rider, Rin helps transfer Shirō's soul to a new body before departing for the Mage's Association to deal with the fallout of the Holy Grail War, returning sometime later to check in on Sakura and Shirō as they see the cherry blossoms bloom.

Saber (セイバー, Seibā; lit. "Saber")
Voiced by: Ayako Kawasumi (Japanese); Kari Wahlgren (English)
Saber is Shirō's Servant for the Fifth Holy Grail War. Loyal, independent, and reserved, Saber acts coldly but suppresses her emotions to focus on her goals. Her class is considered the "Most Outstanding", with excellent ratings in all categories. Since her Master cannot effectively provide her with Mana, she minimizes her activity to preserve her energy. Saber is frustrated by Shirō's "protective" tendencies, believing his erratic and reckless behavior will jeopardize their chances of winning the Holy Grail War. She ultimately is devoured by the Shadow during her fight with True Assassin and, while trapped inside, is confronted by a tainted copy of herself. Broken by despair upon learning the Grail she fought two wars for was corrupted, Saber's personality is completely subsumed by her darker half and only freed of her torment when Shirō kills Saber Alter.

Saber Alter (セイバー・オルタナティブ, Seibā Orutanatibu; lit."Saber Alternative")
Voiced by: Ayako Kawasumi (Japanese); Kari Wahlgren (English)
A black-clad, corrupted version of Saber that confronts the original within the Shadow, bearing inverted morals and a cold, nihilistic disposition. She is the embodiment of Saber's darker nature—born from the despair she experienced in both her life and in the previous Holy Grail War—who overtakes Saber after the revelation of the Grail's corrupt nature drives Saber into despondency. She becomes an antagonist for the second and third films, serving as the primary enforcer of the Shadow. With her sense of restraint gone and fueled by the tainted Grail's immense power, she proves strong enough to defeat Berserker head-on, requiring Shirō and Rider to fight her together. On the war's final day, she is finally defeated when Shirō combines Archer's Rho Aius shield with Rider's Noble Phantasm Bellerophon to break through her Excalibur Morgan, wounding her enough for Shirō to pin and stab her through the heart.

Zouken Matou (間桐 臓硯, Matō Zōken)
Voiced by: Masane Tsukayama (Japanese); Michael Donovan (English)
Zōken is an intelligent, powerful, and ancient sorcerer who is the patriarch of the Matō family and is known to be the grandfather of Shinji and Sakura. He is the primary antagonist of Heaven's Feel. He was originally a Russian magus under the name Zolgen Makiri and one of the original three Magi to propose the Heaven's Feel Holy Grail system, being the designer of the Command Seals. He has amassed an extensive library of sorcery knowledge, yet his lessons are strict and harsh. Zōken considers Shinji a disgrace of a sorcerer, believing Sakura may have more potential than her brother. He is the master of True Assassin but later manipulates the Shadow to control both Saber and Sakura after the Shadow corrupts them. After directing Sakura to kidnap Illya, Zōken's body is destroyed by Kirei with a purification ritual, forcing him to take refuge in his core crest-worm embedded near Sakura's heart. However, before he can possess Sakura's body, Sakura becomes aware of his presence and rips him free of her body, using the Shadow's immense magical power to heal her injuries before crushing him. Eventually, he is stumbled upon by Illya, who channels the soul of his longtime love Justeaze to grant him enough peace to pass on.

Shinji Matou (間桐 慎二, Matō Shinji)
Voiced by: Hiroshi Kamiya (Japanese); Kyle McCarley (English)
The supposed master of Rider and Sakura's older brother. A very vain and self-assured person who prides himself as an equal to Rin. He was once a good friend of Shirō's but became more distant after Sakura started spending her time with the latter. He is later ousted as a false Master, as his spellbook is burned, and Rider returns to her true Master, Sakura. After Rider permanently dissolves their contract and leaves him, Shinji attempts to blackmail Sakura into leaving Shirō with knowledge of his abusing her, causing Sakura to lash out and kill him.

True Assassin (真アサシン, Shin Asashin)
Voiced by: Tetsu Inada (Japanese); Patrick Seitz (English)
Summoned by Zōken Mato, bursting out from within Assassin's flesh when Zōken uses the dying Servant's body as the catalyst to summon him. He is one of the bearers of the title "Hassan-i Sabbah"—the Persian "Old Man of the Mountain"—and a leader of al-Assasīn, from which the term "Assassin" first originated. True Assassin manages to defeat Lancer by blindsiding him while the spearman is occupied by the Shadow, gouging his heart out and devouring it to increase his mental acuity. He uses this same tag-team method to defeat Saber, and, though he fails to remove her heart, he renders her last act of severing his arm in vain by managing to re-attach the limb while The Shadow devours saber. He attempts to kill Shirō immediately after Saber's fall but is defeated by Rider when she comes to Shirō's defense. When the tainted Saber Alter defeats Berserker, he is ordered to abduct Illya but is injured and driven off by Archer. After a corrupted Sakura kidnaps Illya and Shirō mounts a rescue, True Assassin tries to recover Illya and duels Kirei Kotomine before the latter maims Zōken, forcing him to retreat with his Master's fall. When Zōken fails to take over Sakura's body to replace his own, Sakura retaliates, and The Shadow consumes True Assassin.

Kirei Kotomine (言峰 綺礼, Kotomine Kirei)
Voiced by: Jouji Nakata (Japanese); Crispin Freeman (English)
The church priest and the mediator of the Fifth Holy Grail War. Since her father's death, he has been close to Rin as her mentor. He is the master of Lancer and a former participant of the previous Holy Grail War, where he fought Shirō's father, Kiritsugu. He later saves Sakura's life after her powers go out of control, as he is curious to see how far Shirō will go to protect her. Eventually, Shirō begrudgingly enlists his assistance to protect Illya from Zōken's Assassin, after which he mortally injures Zōken by destroying his host body with a purification ritual—during which it is revealed Kirei can only feel happiness by watching people suffer, as he did with his deceased wife Claudia Hortensia and that his wish for the Grail was to learn why a "twisted" person like himself exists. However, his victory is short-lived as he encounters Sakura and belittles her plights, causing her to retaliate by destroying the life-preserving artificial heart the Grail gave him in the last war, though he is ultimately spared when the debilitating pain of absorbing Berserker's soul forces Sakura to retreat. Verging on death, he manages to reach the Greater Grail in Fuyuki Cave right after Shirō frees Sakura from the Shadow, revealing he helped push events in this direction in hopes that Angra Mainyu—the evil entity corrupting the Grail—can answer his existential questions about his life purpose based on how it chooses to act when "born". Although Kirei is the superior fighter, Shirō outlasts Kirei long enough for his body to expire, and Shirō defeats him. Kirei then declares Shirō the victor of the Holy Grail War.

=== Supporting characters ===
Archer (アーチャー, Āchā)
Voiced by: Junichi Suwabe (Japanese); Kaiji Tang (English)
Servant of Rin. He is injured early in the war by Saber, forcing Rin to sacrifice the second of her three Command Spells to save him and form a truce with Shirō. Archer harbors a desire to kill Shirō but abandons his goal when he learns what contaminated the Grail. He is then mortally wounded protecting Rin, Illya, and Shirō from the Shadow, though he lives just long enough to graft his left arm onto Shirō after the latter loses his own. When Shirō decides to unseal Archer's arm, Archer's image appears before him to help affirm his resolve.

Berserker (バーサーカー, Bāsākā)
Servant of Illyasviel von Einzbern. As a powerful brute, he is nearly unstoppable. Waiting for Shirō and Rin to exit the church, he takes this opportunity to attack them. Saber intervenes and is almost defeated by him until Shirou takes a hard blow for Saber. Due to Illyasviel's confusion, they leave. When Zouken confronts Illya, Berserker fights and is ultimately overpowered by the blackened Saber Alter, shortly before the Shadow consumes him. He later reappears in a corrupted state himself, maddened that he no longer recognizes Illya, which forces Shirō to use Archer's transplanted arm against him by copying Berserker's sword. After being mortally wounded by Shirō, Berserker not only breaks free of the Shadow's influence but regains his original sanity, telling Shirō to protect Illya in his stead before fading away.

Gilgamesh (ギルガメッシュ, Girugamesshu)
Voiced by: Tomokazu Seki (Japanese); David Earnest (English)
Unknown to everyone, Gilgamesh is a servant. Seemingly out of nowhere, he pops up into the church while Shirou talks to Kirei. He is later seen standing in front of Sakura, chatting to her. Eventually, he attempts to kill Sakura, but she manifests the Shadow and commands it to devour him, resulting in his death.

Taiga Fujimura (藤村 大河, Fujimura Taiga)
Voiced by: Miki Itou (Japanese); Julie Ann Taylor (English)
Shirō's homeroom teacher and legal guardian following Kiritsugu's passing, whom Shirō regards as an older sister. She is aware of how close Shirō is to Sakura and encourages—or occasionally teases—him to be more open to her about it. She later comforts Sakura when she worries about Shirō and unwittingly helps Illya to forgive Kiritsugu. After the Holy Grail War, Taiga checks in on Shirō and Sakura, supporting their relationship alongside Rider and Rin.

Caster (キャスター, Kyasutā)
Voiced by: Atsuko Tanaka (Japanese); Megan Hollingshead (English)
Servant of Souichirou Kuzuki. First seen in Ryuudou Temple with her master. She leaves to check on Assassin, who is watching the gate. When arriving, she sees his sword at the bottom of the steps as it disappears. She returns to the temple as she sees her master maimed by True Assassin. Threatening to kill her master, she is told to use her Noble Phantasm, Rule Breaker, on herself. After doing so, True Assassin stabs her and kills Souichirou. Zoken's bugs drag her body away, later reanimated and used to fight against Shirō, Rin, and Saber before the Shadow interferes and devours it. During the Grail War's last day, Shirō uses his copy of her Rule Breaker to free Sakura from the Shadow.

Souichirou Kuzuki (葛木 宗一郎, Kuzuki Sōichirō)
Voiced by: Masaki Terasoma (Japanese); Lex Lang (English)
Master of Caster. A teacher at Homurahara Academy, the school where Shirō, Sakura, and Shinji attend. Meeting Caster at Ryuudou Temple, he is sliced up by True Assassin. As his limbs and head are cut but not severed, True Assassin leverages Kuzuki's life against Caster. He is later killed once Caster uses Rule Breaker on herself.

Assassin (アサシン, Asashin)
Voiced by: Shin-ichiro Miki (Japanese); Todd Haberkorn (English)
Servant of Caster. When first shown, Assassin has dropped his sword down the steps of Ryuudou Temple. Bloodied and on the ground, True Assassin explodes out of his body. Later, his body disappears into a shadow.

Lancer (ランサー, Ransā)
Voiced by: Nobutoshi Canna (Japanese); Tony Oliver (English)
Servant of Kirei Kotomine. He briefly appears at the beginning of the first movie, where after Shirou sees him fighting with Archer, Lancer pursues Shirou back to Shirou's house, where Shirou summons Saber and Lancer retreats. He reappears later, following Zoken to the Ryuudou Temple on his Master's orders, where he sees True Assassin kill Caster as well as her Master. He pursues True Assassin through the city and is baited to a lake where the Shadow waits. The Shadow holds Lancer down long enough for True Assassin to use his Noble Phantasm to extract and consume his heart, right before the Shadow finishes him off.

Sella (セラ, Sera)
Voiced by: Haruhi Nanao (Japanese); Julia McIlvaine(theatrical edition);Rachael Lillis (home video edition) (English)
One of Illyasviel's retainers. She is staunchly protective of Illya and often chastises her companion Leysritt's carefree behavior.

Leysritt (リーゼリット, Rīzeritto)
Voiced by: Miho Miyagawa (Japanese); Brianna Knickerbocker (English)
One of Illysviel's retainers. She is far more relaxed than her companion Sella, often earning a rebuke from the former.

Issei Ryūdō (柳洞 一成, Ryūdō Issei)
Voiced by: Mitsuaki Madono (Japanese); Robbie Daymond (English)
A friend of Shirō's and the student body president of his school. His father is the head priest of Ryūdō Temple, where he and the other monks are left unconscious after True Assassin's attack on Caster and Kuzuki. Issei is later questioned by Rin in the hospital while mourning Kuzuki, whom he respected greatly.

Ayako Mitsuzuri (美綴 綾子, Mitsuzuri Ayako)
Voiced by: Fumie Mizusawa (Japanese); Brina Palencia (English)
The captain of the archery dojo and senior to Shirō, who often wishes him to return to archery after his injury. She gets her blood sucked by Rider on Shinji's orders as petty revenge but is saved by Shirō and Saber. Shirō takes her to Kotomine for treatment before she is hospitalized for recovery.

== Production ==
On July 28, 2014, it was announced that an anime film adaptation of the Heaven's Feel route of the Fate/Stay Night series was green-lit at a press conference at Shinagawa, Tokyo, where it was revealed that Ufotable would be adapting. Takahiro Miura would be storyboarding the adaptation. The staff later announced at AnimeJapan 2016 that the film adaptation would be split into three films, with the first film, titled Presage Flower, scheduled to premiere in 2017.

== Reception ==
=== Box office ===
==== Presage Flower ====
Presage Flower in its opening weekend reached #1 at the Japanese box office, grossing ¥413,030,840 from 247,509 admissions within two days. It has grossed $19,035,675 worldwide as of February 2019, including ¥1.5 billion ($13.7 million) in Japan, $4,685,622 in China, $417,439 in South Korea and Australia, $193,833 in the United States and Canada, and $38,781 in Argentina and New Zealand.

==== Lost Butterfly ====
Lost Butterfly debuted at the top of Japan's box office selling 363,080 tickets to earn ¥602,841,741 ($5.55 million) in three days. The film sold 12% more tickets and earned 18% more in its opening weekend than the first film in the trilogy. By its 12th day, the film surpassed ¥1 billion, once again surpassing the record of Pressage Flower. By February 19, 2019 it has sold over 1 million tickets and grossed over ¥1.5 billion ($13.54 million) in Japan.

Overseas, the film grossed HK$1.15 million (US$148,005) in Hong Kong. The North American debut of the film earned $420,595 at the box office in March 2019. In China, where the film released on July 12, 2019, it debuted with an opening weekend of $3.5 million. As of July 14, 2019, the film has grossed $19.8 million worldwide.

==== Spring Song ====
Spring Song's opening topped the Japanese box office, 270,000 tickets sold for a gross of 474,890,600 yen ($4.48 million) in its opening weekend. The movie made 1 billion yen at the Japanese box office in 11 days, reaching the milestone quicker than the first two films, and sold a total of 620,000 tickets in that time. The film went on to earn more than 1.9 billion yen ($18 million) by October 15, 2020, in Japan, until December 31, it grossed 2 billion yen ($18.8 million) in Japan, making it the highest-grossing film in the Heaven's Feel trilogy.

Spring Song went on to earn in South Korea $682,049, in Australia $124,140, in the New Zealand $17,588, in Hong Kong $259,051, in Mexico $75,000

In the United States, Spring Song opened in 10th place at the box office, with estimated earnings of $200,000 from a limited release in 304 theaters.

=== Critical reception ===
==== Presage Flower ====
Kim Morrissy from Anime News Network gave Presage Flower an overall grade of 'A', calling it a fine work of cinema and the best Fate adaptation yet. As the movie focused more on Sakura, the Fandom Post stated that her interactions with Shirou make the best scenes since Shirou's personality did not differ too much from Unlimited Blade Works. In another review, the Fandom Post enjoyed how Shirou's posttraumatic stress disorder over the fire in his city is shown connecting the story with the ending of Fate/Zero, thus exploring deeper area of his past. While the writer enjoyed his interactions with Sakura and Saber, he did not find him as engaging as the Shirou from Unlimited Blade Works persona. UK Anime Network criticized his traits, finding them "bland", but they also thought that the anime adaptation was able to capture Nasu's writing properly.

Kim Morrissy from Anime News Network also listed it as the best film from 2017.

==== Lost Butterfly ====
Kim Morrissy from Anime News Network gave Lost Butterfly an overall grade of 'A', calling Lost Butterfly "even better than the first film", and that the film "amped up the stakes considerably".

==== Spring Song ====
Kim Morrissy from Anime News Network gave Spring Song a "A-", praising the end of Sakura's arc and multiple fight scenes but felt not every character had their own respective outstanding fight. Anime UK News gave it a 9 out of 10, calling a suitable ending not only for the Heaven's Feel arc but also the entire franchise. Chris Beveridge from the Fandom Post also gave it several big scores, praising the emotions the characters express in the narrative, praising how Shirou develops as fighter in his quest to save Sakura while claiming that antagonistic forces liker Berserker and Kire Kotomine also developed impressive portrayals and fight scenes.
