= Gotcha Force =

2003 video game

- North American cover art
- Developer: Capcom
- Publisher: Capcom
- Producer: Yoshihiro Sudo
- Designers: Atsushi Tomita; Shosuke Suzuki
- Artist: Ryuji Higurashi
- Composer: Mitsuhiko Takano
- Platform: GameCube
- Release: JP: 27 November 2003; NA: 5 December 2003; PAL: 20 February 2004
- Genre: Third-person shooter
- Modes: Single-player, multiplayer

Gotcha Force (ガチャフォース, Gacha Fōsu) is a fighting / third-person shooter video game developed and published by Capcom for the GameCube in 2003. It consists primarily of collecting gacha toys and battling with them.

Upon its initial release, the game received mediocre reviews from critics and little advertising. Due to these circumstances, it was not commercially successful, although it has gained a cult following with numerous high fan reviews. The official Capcom Japan website showcases many pieces of concept art and videos. There is also a toy line in Japan though it is extremely rare.

In March 2012, Capcom reprinted copies for the GameCube in Japan nine years after its original release, which stirred talk of a possible future sequel to come.

== Gameplay ==
The game focuses primarily on its combat system, which goes as follows: Before each match, GF Commanders must pick Gotcha Borgs to put on a force. Each Gotcha Borg, depending upon its powers and abilities, costs a specific amount of "GF Energy" in order to place on a force—in Story Mode, GF Energy increases with each match. In multiplayer, GF Energy is determined by players beforehand.

Once Forces are determined, the battle begins. Borgs are placed in an arena, and both Borgs are constantly locked onto each other. If there is more than one enemy, Borgs can switch their lock between enemies, or have the option to lock onto allies (for healing or support). The player must quickly dodge, move, use borg abilities, and use the arena to their advantage in order to evade or block incoming attacks. Borgs often have five attack capabilities that normally consist of close range contextual attacks and three long range attacks, though some Borgs differ.

Once a borg is defeated, that does not mean the match is over. Forces are determined by multiple Gotcha Borgs, and once one is defeated, the next Gotcha Borg in the Force will arrive in the arena, picking up where his or her fallen ally left off. Battles continue until a Force simply has no more Gotcha Borgs. There are many different types, or tribes, of Gotcha Borgs. Some types of Gotcha borgs have the ability to make a partner bigger or make an enemy smaller, some borgs can even change the look and abilities of an opponent — there are many different strategies to use with a single force, counters to these strategies, and counters to these counters. There are over 200 Gotcha Borgs overall.

As you play through, you may also obtain borgs of alternate colours, or even special colours such as silver, gold, shadow, or crystal, each with various effects on the borg's life points though some borgs are significantly harder to obtain than others.

== Plot ==
The Earth is being attacked by "Gotcha Borgs" called the Death Force. Luckily, a child named Kou finds a borg called G-Red and forms the Gotcha Force. Allied by his friends, Kou counterattacks and aims to get rid of the menace, known as the Death Force's leader, the Galactic Emperor.

== Development ==
Gotcha Force was developed on HAL Laboratory Sysdolphin engine.

== Reception ==
Reception

Aggregate score
Aggregator	Score
Metacritic	56/100

Review scores
Publication	Score
Edge	3/10
Electronic Gaming Monthly	5.67/10 (Note: In Electronic Gaming Monthly's review of the game, one critic gave it 7/10, and the rest gave it each a score of 5/10.)
Famitsu	29/40
Game Informer	7/10
GameRevolution	D
GameSpot	5/10
GameSpy	2/5
GameZone	8.5/10
IGN	6.5/10
Nintendo Power	3.4/5
Nintendo World Report	8/10

Gotcha Force received "mixed" reviews according to the review aggregation website Metacritic. Reviewers generally praised the game's concept and gameplay, but found the game to lack depth in the long run. Mary Jane Irwin of IGN stated: "What really hurts it is that the game never progresses beyond the simple battles. I never felt challenged -- and after playing through the story mode for an hour, I felt like I had seen all there was to see." Irwin, along with other reviewers, also noted the game to be more appealing to children. Alex Navarro of GameSpot believed the game "crutches itself far too heavily on brainless, clunky, spastic action that doesn't so much entertain as it bewilders." In Japan, Famitsu gave it a score of one seven, one eight, and two sevens for a total of 29 out of 40.
