= Type-Moon =

Japanese company

Notes Co., Ltd.
- Trade name: Type-Moon
- Native name: タイプムーン
- Romanized name: Taipu Mūn
- Type: Private (Yūgen gaisha)
- Industry: Publishing; Video games; Anime; Manga; Light novels
- Genre: Urban fantasy; visual novel
- Founded: 1999; 27 years ago in Tokyo, Japan
- Founder: Kinoko Nasu; Takashi Takeuchi
- Headquarters: Taitō, Tokyo, Japan (4–1–1 Asakusabashi)
- Area served: Japan
- Key people: Takashi Takeuchi (representative director and producer); Kinoko Nasu (representative director); Nobuyuki Kiyotake (director)
- Products: The Garden of Sinners; Tsukihime; Fate; Witch on the Holy Night
- Subsidiaries: Type-Moon Books; Type-Moon Studio BB
- Website: typemoon.com

Notes Co., Ltd, (Note: Japanese: 有限会社ノーツ, Hepburn: Nōtsu Yūgen gaisha) doing business as Type-Moon, (Note: タイプムーン, Taipu Mūn) is a Japanese media conglomerate that produces video games, anime, manga, light novels, and affiliated merchandise. It was founded in Taitō, Tokyo as a doujin circle in 1999.

Type-Moon had later expanded into a company, and was aided by Japanese programmer Nobuyuki Kiyotake, and Japanese composer Keita Haga. The company uses its official trade name for its publishing and corporate operations, while the use of the brand name Type-Moon serves as a homage to the company's origins as a doujin circle of the same name. After releasing the visual novel Tsukihime as doujin soft, the group incorporated and commercially released the visual novel Fate/Stay Night which had later become one of the most known visual novels in history. Both of the titles were originally produced as adult games, and were later re-released without erotic content.

Co-founder Kinoko Nasu is a prominent figure in the brand, having contributed to the planning and scenario in the majority of Type-Moon's video games. While Takashi Takeuchi, the main designer for the company and another one of its co-founders, had mainly worked on character designs and background art. Keita Haga, Type-Moon's main composer, has composed music for the majority of Type-Moon's titles.

== History ==
=== 1999–2003: Beginnings as a doujin circle ===
Prior to the founding of Type-Moon, Japanese author Kinoko Nasu and Japanese illustrator Takashi Takeuchi had released the first five chapters of the light novel series The Garden of Sinners through the web page of the Takebouki doujin circle. (Note: Officially known as "竹箒" in Japanese and "The Bamboo Broom" in English) They later sold the last two volumes at the Comiket 56 in August 1999. The two alongside programmer Nobuyuki Kiyotake and composer Keita Haga distributed a free floppy disk, announcing the formation of the doujin circle Type-Moon (the name originating from Notes. [sic], one of Nasu's previous works) and the start of the development of the visual novel Tsukihime.

Video game release timeline
| 2000 | Tsukihime |
2001
| 2002 | Melty Blood |
2003
| 2004 | Fate/stay night |
| 2005 | Fate/hollow ataraxia |
2006
| 2007 | Fate/stay night [Realta Nua] |
| 2007 | Fate/tiger colosseum |
| 2008 | Fate/unlimited codes |
2009
| 2010 | Fate/Extra |
2011
| 2012 | Witch on the Holy Night |
| 2013 | Fate/Extra CCC |
2014
| 2015 | Fate/Grand Order |
| 2016 | Fate/Extella: The Umbral Star |
2017
| 2018 | Fate/Extella Link |
2019
2020
| 2021 | Today's Menu for the Emiya Family |
| 2021 | Tsukihime: a piece of glass moon |
| 2021 | Melty Blood: Type Lumina |
2022
| 2023 | Fate/Samurai Remnant |
2024
2025
2026
| 2027 | Melty Blood: Twi-Lumina |

Tsukihime was initially released at Comiket 59 in December 2000. The Tsukihime Plus-Disc omake disc was released at the Sunshine Creation 10 in January 2001. The omake disc contained a fix file for route restrictions that original game had and featured bonus content. Later, at Comiket 60 in August of the same year, the fan disc Kagetsu Tohya, a sequel to Tsukihime, was released. In September 2001, the members of Type-Moon established Notes Co., Ltd. while remaining active as a doujin circle. After the great response it received following the inclusion of the first four chapters of The Garden of Sinners in Plus-Disc, Type-Moon printed a complete edition of the light novel series split in two volumes that were sold at Comiket 61 in December.

In December 2002 at Comiket 63, in collaboration with French-Bread (known as Watanabe Seisakujo before 2003), (Note: Japanese: 渡辺製作所, Hepburn: Seisakusho) Type-Moon released the fighting game visual novel Melty Blood, a doujin game for compatible PCs that serves as the third proper entry in the Tsukihime series. It was followed by the expansion Melty Blood Re-Act, released on 30 May 2004, which received a patch update, Final Tuned, as a free download over the Internet. Type-Moon and French-Bread partnered with Ecole Software to develop and publish a commercial version titled Melty Blood Act Cadenza that was released for Sega NAOMI arcade systems on 25 March 2005 and for the PlayStation 2 on 10 August 2006. A Windows port of Melty Blood Act Cadenza Ver. B, an upgraded version of the arcade edition, was released on 27 August 2007.

Type-Moon had released the Tsuki-Bako: a specially packaged three-disc set that includes Tsukihime, an expanded version of the omake disc named "Plus+Disc", the fan disc, and a new arrangement for all BGM, at Comic Revolution 33 in April 2003. Tsukihime's popularity led to a 12-episode TV anime adaptation by J.C.Staff with the title Lunar Legend Tsukihime that aired from October to December 2003 on BS-i, which was later licensed by Geneon Entertainment for release in North America in 2004. A manga adaptation illustrated by Sasakishonen using the same title as the anime was serialized in the magazine Dengeki Daioh from the October 2003 to September 2010 issues, with its chapters collected across ten volumes published by ASCII Media Works. It was initially licensed by ComicsOne for an English release in North America in 2004, with DrMaster taking over the publication of ComicsOne's manga titles, including Lunar Legend Tsukihime.

=== 2004–2006: Company incorporation, Fate/stay night, hollow ataraxia, and Zero ===
After starting to fully operate as a company, Type-Moon released a demo of its first commercial product, Fate/stay night, on a CD included with the December issue of the magazine Tech Gian from Enterbrain on 21 October 2003. That same demo would also be released as a download on 1 November through Type-Moon's website.

The Fate/stay night visual novel was released on 30 January 2004. A sequel, Fate/hollow ataraxia, was released on 28 October 2005. Fate/stay night would later be turned into a 24-episode TV anime by Studio Deen, airing from 7 January to 17 June 2006, with a second anime series based on the Unlimited Blade Works route premiering in October 2014. A manga series to promote the anime started publication on 26 December 2005 in Kadokawa Shoten's magazine Monthly Shōnen Ace, which had its conclusion on 17 November 2012 with its 20th volume. Fate/stay night was also released for the PlayStation 2 (PS2) in April 2007.

In a collaboration between Type-Moon and Nitro+, writer Gen Urobuchi penned a light novel prequel to Fate/stay night titled Fate/Zero, which Nasu supervised and Takeuchi illustrated. Its first volume released on 29 December 2006, the second on 31 March 2007, the third on 27 July 2007, and the fourth and final one on 29 December 2007, along with the image album Return to Zero produced by ZIZZ Studio.

=== 2007–present: Fate/stay tune ===
The Fate museum during the Type-Moon 15 Years Anniversary Exhibition event.

At Comiket 72 in August 2007, Type-Moon released the "All Around TYPE-MOON drama CD". Type-Moon produced 49 episodes of an Internet radio show called Fate/Stay Tune (フェイト/ステイ チューン, Feito/Sutei Chūn) in regard to the brand between February 2007 and April 2010. Fate/Zero would then be adapted into a four-volume drama CD, with the last release on 22 January 2010, followed by an anime adaptation by Ufotable in 2011–2012.

In August 2019, Type-Moon announced that they established a new company called Type-Moon Studio BB, a video game development studio with former Square Enix and Atlus employee Kazuya Nino, the director for the series Trauma Center, Etrian Odyssey, and Dragon Quest Builders, becoming the head of the studio. According to Nino, the company plans to develop medium to large-scale 3D games in cooperation with external developers and small-scale 2D games developed in-house.

== Releases ==
Type-Moon has developed and produced the following:

=== Tsukihime series ===
- Tsukihime, PC-based adult visual novel game, originally released on 28 December 2000. An anime adaptation of the visual novel, Lunar Legend Tsukihime, by J.C.Staff, aired from 10 October – 26 December 2003.
- Tsukihime Plus-Disc, released on 21 January 2001.
- Kagetsu Tohya, PC-based Tsukihime fan disk, released on 13 August 2001.
- Melty Blood, PC-based fighting game, in association with French-Bread, released on 28 December 2002. Manga serialized from June 2005 to August 2011.
- Melty Blood Re-ACT, PC-based expansion to Melty Blood, released on 20 May 2004.
  - Melty Blood Re-ACT Final Tuned, update patch to Melty Blood Re-ACT, released as a free download.
- talk. and Prelude, are two short stories published in Tsukihime material book's Plus Period published on 22 October 2004, and the Type-Moon's Character material published on 20 August 2006, respectively, intended to act as a prologue to a potential Tsukihime sequel.
- Melty Blood: Act Cadenza, arcade port to Melty Blood released on 25 March 2005, and re-released on the PS2 platform on 10 August 2006.
  - Melty Blood: Act Cadenza Version B, the updated PC port of Act Cadenza, was released on 27 July 2007.
- Melty Blood: Actress Again, arcade released on 19 September 2008, and PS2-port on 20 August 2009.
  - Melty Blood: Actress Again Current Code, the first 2D fighting game for Sega RingWide arcade board, was released on 29 July 2010. Ver. 1.07 was released later for Arcade on 14 October 2011, and a PC port on 30 December 2011, along with the Blu-ray release of Carnival Phantasm Season 3 limited edition. An updated version was released on Steam on 19 April 2016.
- Tsuki no Sango, a story by Nasu for Maaya Sakamoto's Full Moon Recital Hall, a project organized by the Japanese online magazine Saizensen, that consisted of Sakamoto reading short novels in a theater while an accompanying short animation was aired in the background. Tsuki no Sango was the first of the recitals on 21 December 2010, also got a manga adaptation with a story and art by Sasaki Shōnen.
- Tsukihime -A piece of blue glass moon-, the first visual novel re-telling the story of Tsukihime. Released on 26 August 2021, for the PlayStation 4 and Nintendo Switch.
- Melty Blood: Type Lumina, the first Type-Moon fighting game and overall for Xbox console port, as well as a "What-If" story to Tsukihime Remake titles and Reboot to the Melty Blood series, released worldwide on Xbox One, PlayStation 4, Nintendo Switch, Microsoft Windows, and Steam on 30 September 2021.
- Melty Blood: Twi-Lumina, the sequel to Melty Blood: Type Lumina set to be released in April 22, 2027.
- Tsukihime -The other side of red garden-, the second visual novels re-telling the story of Tsukihime (release TBA).

=== Fate series ===
- Fate/stay night, PC-based visual novel game, released on 30 January 2004. A DVD version was released on 29 March 2006, and a non-ero PS2 port entitled Fate/stay night [Réalta Nua] was released on 19 April 2007, and re-ported non-ero to PC on three versions covering each arc. Currently, four anime adaptations exist of Fate/stay night: the first was produced by Studio Deen and primarily based on the visual novel's Fate route, the second was a film adaptation of the Unlimited Blade Works route and also produced by Studio Deen, and the third was a TV remake of the Unlimited Blade Works route produced by Ufotable. The Heaven's Feel route was also adapted into a movie trilogy by Ufotable.
- Fate/hollow ataraxia, PC-based Fate/stay night sequel, released on 28 October 2005, re-released for PS Vita on 27 November 2014.
- Fate/school life, is a comedy 4-koma manga by Eiichirou Mashin revolving around the normal life at school of the minor characters of Fate/stay night and Fate/hollow ataraxia, in later volumes, other characters from different TYPE-MOON works would also appear.
- Fate/Zero, a light novel prequel to Fate/stay night, were released from 29 December 2006, to 29 December 2007. Made in collaboration with Nitroplus. Anime adaptation by ufotable aired from 1 October 2011, to 23 June 2012.
- Fate/Prototype, is an animated short by Studio Lerche, distributed with the third home release of Carnival Phantasm on 31 December 2011. Based on the Second Tokyo Holy Grail War, it is the original concept of Kinoko Nasu's for Fate/stay night. It has yet to be adapted as a full series, with only a short animated feature and production notes detailing the story.
  - Fate/Prototype: Fragments of Sky Silver, a light novel written by Hikaru Sakurai, illustrated by Nakahara, and published by Kadokawa Shouten, were released from 10 September 2014, to 26 April 2017. It is a prequel of Fate/Prototype, the original version of Fate/stay night, with a female protagonist.
  - Fate/Labyrinth, a light novel by Hikaru Sakurai, illustrated by Nakahara. It is a side-story to Fate/Prototype: Fragments of Blue and Silver and was released on 9 January 2016, between Fragments' 3rd and 4th volumes.
- Fate/kaleid liner Prisma Illya, a spin-off manga series written and illustrated by Hiroyama Hiroshi, serialized in Comp Ace magazine from 26 September 2007, to 26 November 2008, followed by two sequels entitled 2wei! and 3rei!!
- Fate/tiger colosseum, PSP 3D fighting game, released on 13 September 2007. Made by Capcom and Cavia.
- Fate/unlimited codes, arcade, PS2, and PSP 3D fighting game, released on 28 October 2008.
- Fate/Extra, an RPG dungeon-crawler for the PSP-system, released on 22 July 2010. Sequel/side-story Fate/Extra CCC was released on 28 March 2013. An anime version titled by Shaft as Fate/Extra Last Encore
  - Fate/Extella: The Umbral Star, an action RPG game released on 10 November 2016, for PS4, PS Vita, Nintendo Switch and Microsoft Windows.
  - Fate/Extella Link, an action RPG game for PS4, PS Vita, Nintendo Switch and Microsoft Windows released on 7 June 2018 that is a direct sequel to Umbral Star.
  - Fate/Extra Record, a remake of the original Fate/Extra with a revamped battle system and updated visuals. It is the first project by the new Type-Moon Studio BB.
- Fate/Apocrypha, a light novel by Yuuichirou Higashide and illustrated by Konoe Ototsugu, was released between 29 December 2012, and 30 December 2014, spanning five volumes. An anime adaptation by A-1 Pictures aired between 2 July 2017, and 30 December 2017, with international localization by Netflix.
- The Case Files of Lord El-Melloi II, a light novel written by Makoto Sanda, illustrated by Sakamoto Mineji and published by TYPE-MOON under their label TYPE-MOON BOOKS on 30 December 2014, to 17 May 2019. It is considered a side-story to Fate/Zero, following one of the protagonists as an adult. A manga adaptation illustrated by Tō Azuma has been serialized. An anime adaptation by Troyca aired from 6 July – 28 September 2019.
  - The Adventures of Lord El-Melloi II, sequel to The Case Files, began publishing on 25 December 2020.
- Fate/strange fake, a light novel series written by Ryohgo Narita, illustrated by Morii Shizuki, and published in Dengeki Bunko starting on 10 January 2015. It is a remake of the original 2008 April's Fool's web-published one-shot known as Fake/states night, which was later edited and included in TYPE-MOON Ace Vol.2 in 2009. A manga adaptation, also illustrated by Morii Shizuki, is being released alongside the aforementioned current novelization.
- Fate/Grand Order, an RPG for the Android/iOS that was released on 30 July 2015. The game contains characters from previous TYPE-MOON properties along with new characters. A new class, Shielder, was added to the game. The first chapter of the game was animated by Lay-duce as a television movie titled Fate/Grand Order First Order aired on 31 December 2016.
  - Fate/Grand Carnival, an OVA series that is a spiritual successor to Carnival Phantasm, focusing on characters from Fate/Grand Order.
- Today's Menu for the Emiya Family, a spin-off manga series written and illustrated by TAa, serialized in Kadokawa Shoten's Young Ace Up starting on 26 January 2016. It received an original net animation adaptation by ufotable from 2018 to 2019. A video game adaptation for the Nintendo Switch was released on 28 April 2021.
- Fate/Requiem, a light novel by Meteo Hoshriza, published on 31 December 2018. Set in a timeline where a large Holy Grail War took place, which resulted in everyone having a servant in the aftermath.
- Fate/type Redline, a spin-off manga series written by Keikenchi and illustrated by Ryoji Hirano, based on the gag manga Koha-Ace.
- Fate/Samurai Remnant, an action RPG released in 2023 for Nintendo Switch, PlayStation 4, PlayStation 5 and Windows. It is the story of the Waxing Moon Ritual, a subspecies of a Holy Grail War taking place in Japan during the Edo period.

=== Other ===
- The Garden of Sinners, known in Japan as Boundary of Emptiness (空の境界, Kara no Kyōkai) and sometimes referred to as Rakkyo (らっきょ), is a light novel series originally released as a series of chapters released independently online or at Comiket between October 1998 and August 1999, the chapters were later republished by Kodansha into two volumes released both on 8 June 2004, and again in three volumes between 15 November 2007, and 16 January 2008. Ufotable produced a series of seven anime films based on the series between 1 December 2007, and 28 September 2013, and also produced an original video animation episode on 2 February 2011. A final anime film was produced and released in 2013. A manga adaptation illustrated by Sphere Tenku started serialization in September 2010 in Seikaisha's online magazine Saizensen.
- Notes. is a short novel by Kinoko Nasu and published in May 1999 for an angels-centered doujin anthology, Angel Voice.
- Decoration Disorder Disconnection (DDD), a light novel by Kinoko Nasu and illustrated by Hirokazu Koyama, published irregularly in the Faust magazine, with two volumes released in 2004, the series is currently on hiatus.
- Carnival Phantasm, animated OVA series by Lerche based on Take Moon a parody manga created by Eri Takenashi, mixing characters from Tsukihime, Kagetsu Tohya, Melty Blood, Fate/stay night, Fate/hollow ataraxia with minor cameo appearances from Fate/Zero, Fate/Extra, The Garden of Sinners, Witch on the Holy Night and KOHA-ACE characters.
- All Around Type-Moon, is a drama CD released at Comiket 72 on 17 August 2007. Various TYPE-MOON characters interact within Ahnenerbe and find themselves in comedic situations. It has a manga adaptation.
- 428: Shibuya Scramble, Nasu wrote a special scenario for the game, with Takashi Takeuchi providing the character designs. This scenario sequel is an anime, Canaan.
- Witch on the Holy Night, a visual novel written by Kinoko Nasu, featuring art by Hirokazu Koyama and music by Fukasawa Hideyuki. Originally written and set before The Garden of Sinners and Tsukihime, the story follows a young Aozaki Aoko alongside two new faces – Kuonji Alice and Soujuuro Shizuki. In an interview with 4Gamer, Kinoko Nasu expressed the desire to make a game that feels like a finished work and considers this a success. It was released on 12 April 2012. This is the first Type-Moon visual novel not to be an adult game. An anime film adaptation by ufotable was released on November 20, 2026.
- Fire Girl, a light novel with an original story by ex-Liarsoft member Hoshizora Meteor and illustrations by bunbun, published by Type-Moon under their label TYPE-MOON BOOKS, were released from 29 December 2012, to 18 March 2016.
- World Conquest Zvezda Plot, a 2014 anime television series directed by Tensai Okamura, written by Hoshizora Meteor and animated by A-1 Pictures.
- Sekai Seifuku 〜 Shiroi Keito to Manatsu no Berubiaaje, a light novel side-story of World Conquest Zvezda Plot, written by Kimura Kou and illustrated by Kouhaku Kuroboshi was released on 22 March 2014, published under the TYPE-MOON BOOKS label.
- Girls' Work was announced on 1 June 2008, as a PC visual novel work written by ex-Liarsoft members Hoshizora Meteor, Myogaya Jinroku, and Kimura Kou, with character designs by Takenashi Eri, but on 24 December 2010, it was announced to be restarted as a joint animation project with animation production company ufotable and Aniplex. As of November 2026, there have been no announcements about the project.
