= Fate/Tiger Colosseum =

2007 video game

- Developers: Cavia; Type-Moon
- Publisher: Capcom
- Designer: Satoshi Iwataki
- Series: Fate
- Platform: PlayStation Portable
- Release: JP: September 13, 2007; JP: June 16, 2008 (Upper)
- Genre: Fighting
- Modes: Single-player, multiplayer

Fate/Tiger Colosseum (Note: Known in Japan as Feito/Taigā Colosseum (Japanese: フェイト/タイガーころしあむ, Hepburn: Feito/Taigā Koroshiamu; lit. Fate/Tiger Colosseum)) is a fighting game developed by Cavia and Type-Moon. It was released on July 27, 2007 in Japan exclusively for the PlayStation Portable, and is rated for all ages. The game is based on Type-Moon's visual novel Fate/Stay Night. All the characters are rendered in a 3D chibi-style. Type-Moon would later go on to produce a spin-off titled Fate/Tiger Colosseum Upper in August 2008.

== Characters ==
Archer and Saber clash

Playable characters in the game include Archer, Rin Tōsaka, Shirō Emiya, Sakura Matō, Saber, and Taiga Fujimura.

All characters from the Fate/Stay Night series, as well as the main characters of Fate/Hollow Ataraxia, Bazett Fraga McRemitz and Caren Ortensia, make an appearance as playable characters.

A bonus character was also seen as a new addition to the roster of characters. That character was revealed as Saber dressed in a lion costume (to represent her favorite animal) wielding a piece of meat. In the trailers all she says is "Gao Gao Gao!"—the Japanese onomatopoeia for a roar.

== Reception ==
Fate/tiger colosseum was the 4th best-selling game during its first week of release in Japan, according to sources from the Japanese sales analysis website Media Create's Weekly Ranking, selling 54,880 copies. It then rose to 3rd place with 64,530 copies sold. Its final sales figure was 68,677 units sold in Japan.

The game received scores of 70/70/70/60 from Dengeki and 25 out of 40 (7/6/6/6) from Famitsu.
