= Music of Attack on Titan =

Anime series discography

This article lists the soundtrack albums attributed to the anime series Attack on Titan. Seasons 1–3 soundtracks were composed by Hiroyuki Sawano while Season 4 soundtracks were composed by Kohta Yamamoto and Sawano.

== Attack on Titan Original Soundtrack ==
Attack on Titan Original Soundtrack

Soundtrack album by Hiroyuki Sawano
- Released: June 28, 2013
- Studios: Sound Valley (Shinjuku, Tokyo); Bunkamura (Shibuya, Tokyo); Greenbird (Shinjuku, Tokyo); Onkio Haus (Chūō, Tokyo)
- Length: 77:27
- Languages: German, English
- Label: Pony Canyon
- Director: Yasushi Horiguchi
- Producers: Hiroyuki Sawano; Yasushi Horiguchi (co-producer)

Attack on Titan soundtrack albums chronology
Attack on Titan Original Soundtrack (2013)	Attack on Titan Season 2 Original Soundtrack (2017)

TV Anime Attack on Titan Original Soundtrack (TVアニメ「進撃の巨人」オリジナル・サウンドトラック, Terebi Anime「Shingeki no Kyojin」Orijinaru・Saundotorakku) is the soundtrack to the first season of the series. It was composed by Hiroyuki Sawano and released on June 28, 2013, by Pony Canyon.

=== Track listing ===
All music is composed by Hiroyuki Sawano.

Attack on Titan Original Soundtrack standard edition
No.	Title	Lyrics	Vocals	Length
1.	"ətˈæk 0N tάɪtn"	Rie	Mika Kobayashi	4:16
2.	"The Reluctant Heroes"	mpi	mpi	4:27
3.	"eye-water"			3:01
4.	"立body機motion"			5:42
5.	"cóunter・attàck-mˈænkάɪnd"			6:06
6.	"army⇒G♂"			3:26
7.	"Vogel im Käfig"	Rie	Cyua	6:20
8.	"DOA"	mpi	Aimee Blackschleger	3:26
9.	"凸】♀】♂】←巨人"			4:21
10.	"E・M・A"			5:42
11.	"巨♀~9地区"			5:15
12.	"Bauklötze"	Rie	Kobayashi	3:56
13.	"2chi城"			6:47
14.	"XL-TT"			6:37
15.	"Call your name"	mpi	mpi, CASG (Caramel Apple Sound Gadget)	4:28
16.	"omake-pfadlib"			3:31
Total length:				77:27

Attack on Titan Original Soundtrack II Blu-ray first press limited edition
No.	Title	Length
1.	"進撃st-hrn-egt20130629巨人"	5:00
2.	"進撃pf20130218巨人"	4:41
3.	"進撃gt20130218巨人"	2:31
4.	"進撃st-hrn-gt-pf20130629巨人"	4:37
5.	"進撃vc-pf20130218巨人"	6:11
6.	"進撃vn-pf20130524巨人"	3:23
7.	"進撃pf-adlib-b20130218巨人"	2:51
8.	"進撃st20130629巨人"	5:25
9.	"進撃pf-adlib-c20130218巨人"	3:53
10.	"進撃st-hrn-gt20130629巨人"	4:13
11.	"進撃pf-medley20130629巨人"	5:06
Total length:		47:51

== Attack on Titan Season 2 Original Soundtrack ==
Attack on Titan Season 2 Original Soundtrack

Soundtrack album by Hiroyuki Sawano
- Released: June 7, 2017
- Studios: LAB Recorders (Minato, Tokyo); Sound Valley (Shinjuku, Tokyo); Bunkamura (Shibuya, Tokyo); Sound City (Minato, Tokyo); Greenbird (Shinjuku, Tokyo); Onkio Haus (Chūō, Tokyo)
- Length: 149:00
- Languages: English, German
- Label: Pony Canyon
- Producers: Hiroyuki Sawano; Yasushi Horiguchi (co-producer)

Attack on Titan soundtrack albums chronology
Attack on Titan Original Soundtrack (2013)	Attack on Titan Season 2 Original Soundtrack (2017)	Attack on Titan Season 3 Original Soundtrack (2019)

Singles from Attack on Titan Season 2 Original Soundtrack
- 1. "YAMANAIAME" Released: November 19, 2014; 2. "theDOGS" Released: July 1, 2015

TV Anime Attack on Titan Season 2 Original Soundtrack (TVアニメ「進撃の巨人」Season 2 オリジナル・サウンドトラック, Terebi Anime「Shingeki no Kyojin」Season 2 Orijinaru・Saundotorakku) is the soundtrack to the second season of the series. It was composed by Hiroyuki Sawano and released on June 7, 2017, by Pony Canyon.

=== Track listing ===
All music is composed by Hiroyuki Sawano.

Disc 1
No.	Title	Lyrics	Vocals	Length
1.	"Barricades"	Benjamin, mpi	Yosh from Survive Said the Prophet, Gemie, mpi	3:41
2.	"APETITAN"			5:31
3.	"YouSeeBIGGIRL/T:T"	Rie	Gemie	5:58
4.	"son2seaVer"			5:22
5.	"Call of Silence"	cAnON.	Gemie	2:57
6.	"ERENthe標"			6:23
7.	"attack音D"			4:44
8.	"YAMANAIAME"	Benjamin, mpi	Mica Caldito, mpi, Mika Kobayashi	4:27
9.	"2Volt"			6:46
10.	"進撃st-hrn-egt20130629巨人"			5:00
11.	"So ist es immer"	Rie, Benjamin, mpi	Benjamin	4:48
12.	"進撃st-hrn-gt-pf20130629巨人"			4:36
13.	"ymniam-orch"			3:09
14.	"The Reluctant Heroes ᐸMODvᐳ"	mpi	Caldito	4:30
15.	"進撃st-hrn-gt20130629巨人"			4:12
16.	"theDOGS"	Benjamin, mpi	mpi	4:35

Disc 2
No.	Title	Lyrics	Vocals	Length
1.	"進撃pf-medley20130629巨人"			5:06
2.	"EMAymniam"			5:31
3.	"進撃pf20130218巨人"			4:40
4.	"進撃gt20130218巨人"			2:31
5.	"TWO-lives"			4:57
6.	"進撃st20130629巨人"			5:25
7.	"進撃vn-pf20130524巨人"			3:23
8.	"ymniam-MKorch"	Benjamin, mpi	Kobayashi	2:36
9.	"進撃pf-adlib-c20130218巨人"			3:53
10.	"進撃pf-adlib-b20130218巨人"			2:50
11.	"進撃vc-pf20130218巨人"			6:11
12.	"TheWeightOfLives"			7:20
13.	"YAMANAIAME ᐸFMvᐳ"	Benjamin, mpi	Caldito	4:28
14.	"AOTs2M他1"			4:10
15.	"AOTs2M他2"			2:08
16.	"AOTs2M他3"			3:25
17.	"AOTs2M他4"			4:03
Total length:				149:00

== Attack on Titan Season 3 Original Soundtrack ==
Attack on Titan Season 3 Original Soundtrack

Soundtrack album by Hiroyuki Sawano
- Released: June 26, 2019
- Studios: Sound City (Minato, Tokyo); Bunkamura (Shibuya, Tokyo); Greenbird (Shinjuku, Tokyo); LAB Recorders (Minato, Tokyo); HeartBeat Recording (Setagaya, Tokyo); Sound Valley (Shinjuku, Tokyo)
- Length: 123:59
- Label: Pony Canyon
- Producer: Hiroyuki Sawano

Attack on Titan soundtrack albums chronology
Attack on Titan Season 2 Original Soundtrack (2017)	Attack on Titan Season 3 Original Soundtrack (2019)	Attack on Titan The Final Season Original Soundtrack (2021)

TV Anime Attack on Titan Season 3 Original Soundtrack (TVアニメ「進撃の巨人」Season 3 オリジナル・サウンドトラック, Terebi Anime「Shingeki no Kyojin」Season 3 Orijinaru・Saundotorakku) is the soundtrack to the third season of the series. It was composed by Hiroyuki Sawano and released on June 26, 2019, by Pony Canyon.

=== Track listing ===
All music is composed by Hiroyuki Sawano.

Disc 1
No.	Title	Lyrics	Vocals	Length
1.	"K2-"			5:46
2.	"Zero Eclipse"	Benjamin, mpi	Laco	4:13
3.	"SymphonicSuite[AoT]Part1-1st:0Sk"			6:10
4.	"SymphonicSuite[AoT]Part1-2nd:一s十りA"			3:51
5.	"SymphonicSuite[AoT]Part1-3rd:BARRIchestra"			5:59
6.	"SymphonicSuite[AoT]Part1-4th:7-b@$"			5:17
7.	"K21"	David Whitaker	Whitaker	3:23
8.	"AoTs3-3spens/21石"			6:32
9.	"Call your name ᐸGvᐳ"	mpi	Gemie	4:19
10.	"SymphonicSuite[AoT]Part2-1st:ətˈæk 0N tάɪtn ᐸWMIdᐳ"	Rie	Eliana	5:10
11.	"SymphonicSuite[AoT]Part2-2nd:ShingekiNoKyojin"			3:02
12.	"SymphonicSuite[AoT]Part2-3rd:Before Lights Out"	Benjamin, mpi	Laco	2:55
13.	"SymphonicSuite[AoT]Part2-4th:2An"			2:38
14.	"SymphonicSuite[AoT]Part2-5th:Apple Seed"	Benjamin, mpi	mpi, Laco	2:46
15.	"SymphonicSuite[AoT]Part2-6th:ThanksAT"			3:59
16.	"ERENthe標 ᐸMOVIEver.ᐳ"			6:24
17.	"Barricades ᐸMOVIEver.ᐳ"	Benjamin, mpi	Yosh from Survive Said the Prophet	4:17
Total length:				76:41

Disc 2
No.	Title	Lyrics	Vocals	Length
1.	"AoTs3-PF1"			2:05
2.	"T-KT"			2:54
3.	"A1Gう"	mpi	Aimee Blackschleger	3:20
4.	"AoTs3-PF2"			3:24
5.	"AoTs3-1000略"			3:27
6.	"tooth-i:"			3:03
7.	"LENぞ97n10火巨説MAHLE"			2:14
8.	"K21" (instrumental)			3:21
9.	"Zero Eclipse" (instrumental)			4:11
10.	"Barricades ᐸMOVIEver.ᐳ" (instrumental)			4:16
11.	"Call your name ᐸGvᐳ" (instrumental)			4:19
12.	"ətˈæk 0N tάɪtn ᐸWMIdᐳ" (instrumental)			5:08
13.	"Before Lights Out" (instrumental)			2:53
14.	"Apple Seed" (instrumental)			2:46
Total length:				47:18

== Attack on Titan The Final Season Original Soundtrack ==
Attack on Titan The Final Season Original Soundtrack

Soundtrack album by Kohta Yamamoto & Hiroyuki Sawano
- Released: June 23, 2021
- Length: 90:56
- Label: Pony Canyon
- Producers: Kohta Yamamoto; Hiroyuki Sawano

Attack on Titan soundtrack albums chronology
Attack on Titan Season 3 Original Soundtrack (2019)	Attack on Titan The Final Season Original Soundtrack (2021)	Attack on Titan The Final Season Original Soundtrack 02 (2022)

Singles from Attack on Titan The Final Season Original Soundtrack
- 1. "Ashes on The Fire" Released: February 1, 2021

TV Anime Attack on Titan The Final Season Original Soundtrack (TVアニメ「進撃の巨人」The Final Season オリジナル・サウンドトラック, Terebi Anime「Shingeki no Kyojin」The Final Season Orijinaru・Saundotorakku) is the soundtrack to the first part for the final season of the series. It was composed by Kohta Yamamoto (tracks 1–20), and Hiroyuki Sawano (tracks 21–23) and was released on June 23, 2021 by Pony Canyon. It contains 23 tracks, with two vocal tracks featuring performances by Cumi and Hannah Grace.

=== Track listing ===
All music is composed by Kohta Yamamoto, except where noted.

Attack on Titan The Final Season Original Soundtrack track listing
No.	Title	Lyrics	Music	Vocals	Length
1.	"Ashes on The Fire"				4:34
2.	"The Other Side of the Sea"				4:57
3.	"Splinter Wolf"	Benjamin, mpi		cumi	5:21
4.	"Nightmare"				3:41
5.	"Guilty Hero"				4:22
6.	"The Successor"				4:09
7.	"Memory Lane"	Benjamin, mpi		Hannah Grace	3:03
8.	"Liberio at Night"				2:56
9.	"Liberio Festival"				3:03
10.	"True History"				5:20
11.	"The Warriors"				4:06
12.	"The Fall of Marley"				3:18
13.	"Zeek's Plan"				3:47
14.	"Nowhere to go"				3:05
15.	"Atonement"				3:18
16.	"Cold Light"				3:34
17.	"The Reason"				3:26
18.	"Friendships"				3:44
19.	"Memory Lane Vln ver."				3:03
20.	"Liberio at Night Pf & Vln ver."				2:57
21.	"AOTF-s1"		Hiroyuki Sawano		7:57
22.	"AOTF-s2"		Sawano		3:33
23.	"AOTF-s3"		Sawano		3:42
Total length:					90:56

== Attack on Titan The Final Season Original Soundtrack 02 ==
Attack on Titan The Final Season Original Soundtrack 02

Soundtrack album by Kohta Yamamoto & Hiroyuki Sawano
- Released: June 22, 2022
- Length: 67:30
- Label: Pony Canyon
- Producers: Kohta Yamamoto; Hiroyuki Sawano

Attack on Titan soundtrack albums chronology
Attack on Titan The Final Season Original Soundtrack (2021)	Attack on Titan The Final Season Original Soundtrack 02 (2022)	Attack on Titan The Final Season Original Soundtrack 03 (2023)

TV Anime Attack on Titan The Final Season Original Soundtrack 02 (TVアニメ「進撃の巨人」The Final Season オリジナル・サウンドトラック02, Terebi Anime「Shingeki no Kyojin」The Final Season Orijinaru・Saundotorakku 02) is the soundtrack to the second part for the final season of the series. It was composed by Kohta Yamamoto and Hiroyuki Sawano and released on June 22, 2022, by Pony Canyon.

=== Track listing ===
All music is composed by Kohta Yamamoto, except where noted.

Attack on Titan The Final Season Original Soundtrack 02 track listing
No.	Title	Lyrics	Music	Vocals	Length
1.	"Footsteps of Doom"				5:06
2.	"Into the Night Acoustic ver."	Karen Yamaguchi		Yamaguchi	2:11
3.	"Ashes on The Fire -PTV-"				5:06
4.	"MAN-Child"				3:47
5.	"All of The Freedoms"				4:38
6.	"TRAITOR"				4:47
7.	"Night of The End"				4:01
8.	"From You, 2,000 Years Ago"				6:55
9.	"The Global Allied Fleet"				3:54
10.	"MICHI"				4:44
11.	"THAW"				4:17
12.	"Into the Night"	Yamaguchi		Yamaguchi	4:09
13.	"EL○"		Hiroyuki Sawano		4:41
14.	"YouSee-Power"		Sawano		4:17
15.	"ətˈæk 0N tάɪtnᐸTFSvᐳ"	Rie	Sawano	Eliana	4:57
Total length:					67:30

== Attack on Titan The Final Season Original Soundtrack 03 ==
Attack on Titan The Final Season Original Soundtrack 03

Soundtrack album by Kohta Yamamoto & Hiroyuki Sawano
- Released: November 8, 2023
- Length: 23:34
- Label: Pony Canyon
- Producers: Kohta Yamamoto; Hiroyuki Sawano

Attack on Titan soundtrack albums chronology
Attack on Titan The Final Season Original Soundtrack 02 (2022)	Attack on Titan The Final Season Original Soundtrack 03 (2023)	Attack on Titan The Final Season Original Soundtrack Complete Album (2024)

TV Anime Attack on Titan The Final Season Original Soundtrack 03 (TVアニメ「進撃の巨人」The Final Season オリジナル・サウンドトラック03, Terebi Anime「Shingeki no Kyojin」The Final Season Orijinaru・Saundotorakku 03) is the soundtrack to the third and final part for the final season of the series. It was composed by Kohta Yamamoto and Hiroyuki Sawano and released on November 8, 2023, by Pony Canyon.

=== Track listing ===
All music is composed by Kohta Yamamoto, except where noted.

Attack on Titan The Final Season Original Soundtrack 03 track listing
No.	Title	Music	Length
1.	"An Ordinary Day"		5:43
2.	"Aim of the Fate"		3:40
3.	"Liar"		3:57
4.	"ətˈæk till we are Ashes"	Yamamoto & Hiroyuki Sawano	6:54
5.	"Vanishment"		3:20
Total length:			23:34

== Attack on Titan The Final Season Original Soundtrack Complete Album ==
Attack on Titan The Final Season Original Soundtrack Complete Album

Soundtrack album by Kohta Yamamoto & Hiroyuki Sawano
- Released: July 17, 2024
- Label: Pony Canyon
- Producers: Kohta Yamamoto; Hiroyuki Sawano

Attack on Titan soundtrack albums chronology
Attack on Titan The Final Season Original Soundtrack 03 (2023)	Attack on Titan The Final Season Original Soundtrack Complete Album (2024)

TV Anime Attack on Titan The Final Season Original Soundtrack Complete Album (TVアニメ「進撃の巨人」The Final Season オリジナル・サウンドトラック Complete Album, Terebi Anime「Shingeki no Kyojin」The Final Season Orijinaru・Saundotorakku Kompuriito Arubamu) is a compilation album for the final season of the series. Composed by Kohta Yamamoto and Hiroyuki Sawano, it was released on July 17, 2024, by Pony Canyon.

All music is composed by Kohta Yamamoto, except where noted.

Disc 1
No.	Title	Lyrics	Music	Vocals	Length
1.	"Ashes on The Fire"				4:34
2.	"The Other Side of the Sea"				4:57
3.	"Splinter Wolf"	Benjamin, mpi		cumi	5:21
4.	"Nightmare"				3:41
5.	"Guilty Hero"				4:22
6.	"The Successor"				4:09
7.	"Memory Lane"	Benjamin, mpi		Hannah Grace	3:03
8.	"Liberio at Night"				2:56
9.	"Liberio Festival"				3:03
10.	"True History"				5:20
11.	"The Warriors"				4:06
12.	"The Fall of Marley"				3:18
13.	"Zeek's Plan"				3:47
14.	"Cold Light"				3:34
15.	"Nowhere to go"				3:05
16.	"AOTF-s1"		Sawano		7:57
17.	"AOTF-s2"		Sawano		3:33
18.	"AOTF-s3"		Sawano		3:42
Total length:					74:28

Disc 2
No.	Title	Lyrics	Music	Vocals	Length
1.	"Footsteps of Doom"				5:06
2.	"Into the Night Acoustic ver."	Karen Yamaguchi		Yamaguchi	2:11
3.	"Ashes on The Fire -PTV-"				5:06
4.	"MAN-Child"				3:47
5.	"All of The Freedoms"				4:38
6.	"TRAITOR"				4:47
7.	"Night of The End"				4:01
8.	"From You, 2,000 Years Ago"				6:55
9.	"The Global Allied Fleet"				3:54
10.	"MICHI"				4:44
11.	"THAW"				4:17
12.	"Into the Night"	Yamaguchi		Yamaguchi	4:09
13.	"EL○"		Sawano		4:41
14.	"YouSee-Power"		Sawano		4:17
15.	"ətˈæk 0N tάɪtnᐸTFSvᐳ"	Rie	Sawano	Eliana	4:57
Total length:					67:30

All tracks arranged by Kohta Yamamoto. All tracks composed by Yamamoto, except where noted.

Disc 3
No.	Title	Music	Length
1.	"An Ordinary Day"		5:43
2.	"Aim of the Fate"		3:40
3.	"Liar"		3:57
4.	"ətˈæk till we are Ashes"	Yamamoto & Sawano	6:54
5.	"Vanishment"		3:20
6.	"The Reason"		3:26
7.	"Friendships"		3:44
8.	"Memory Lane Vln ver."		3:03
9.	"Liberio at Night Pf&Vln ver."		2:56
10.	"Atonement"		3:18
Total length:			40:01

Disc 4 (Blu-ray)
No.	Title	Length
1.	"Attack on Titan The Final Season Special Live Event 2022"
