= IV (Hiroyuki Sawano album) =

2021 studio album by SawanoHiroyuki[nZk]

iv

Studio album by SawanoHiroyuki[nZk]
- Released: March 3, 2021
- Recorded: 2019–2021
- Studios: HeartBeat. Recording Studio; LAB Recorders; Studio Sound City; Studio Sound City Annex; Studio A-tone Yotsuya; Burnish Stone Recording Studios; Onkio Haus; Studio Sound Valley; emU Studio
- Genres: Pop; pop rock
- Length: 57:55
- Label: Sacra Music
- Producer: Hiroyuki Sawano

SawanoHiroyuki[nZk] chronology
R∃/MEMBER (2019)	iv (2021)	V (2023)

Singles from iv
- 1. "Trollz" Released: September 6, 2019; 2. "Tranquility" Released: October 2, 2019; 3. "Cry" Released: May 17, 2020; 4. "Chaos Drifters" Released: July 29, 2020; 5. "Time" Released: January 18, 2021

IV is the fourth studio album by Hiroyuki Sawano's vocal project SawanoHiroyuki[nZk]. It was released on March 3, 2021, through the Sony Music label Sacra Music. Five singles were released from the album: "Tranquility", "Trollz", "Chaos Drifters", "CRY" and "time".

The album charted at #9 in the daily ranks for the first week. It charted for 6 weeks in the Oricon charts.

== Background ==
Various double A side singles were released prior to the album release, the first being "Tranquility / Trollz". The first track off the album, "Trollz" with Japanese singer Laco from the band EOW, was released on September 6, 2019, as a pre-order track from the single. While the second track off the album, "Tranquility", featuring the Japanese singer Anly, was used in the anime movie Ginga Eiyuu Densetsu: Die Neue These – Seiran as the ending theme and was released on October 2, 2019. This single also contains the song "Felidae", which was rearranged and later included in the album.

The second double A side single titled "Chaos Drifters / CRY" was announced on March 12, 2020, to be released on May 27, 2020, but due to the COVID-19 pandemic, it was delayed to July 29, 2020. The song "CRY" from the single was released on May 17, 2020, as a pre-order track, it features the Japanese singer mizuki and was used as the opening theme for the rebroadcast of the anime Ginga Eiyuu Densetsu: Die Neue These. The second track, Chaos Drifters, features Japanese singer Jean-Ken Johnny from Man with a Mission, and was used as the opening theme for the anime No Guns Life second season.

The last song off the album until it was released was "time" featuring Japanese singer ReoNa and was used as the ending theme for the anime Seven Deadly Sins: Dragon's Judgement. It was released on January 18, 2021.

On January 6, 2021, Hiroyuki Sawano announced the album release date and part of the tracklist, which included the singles that were previously released and three bonus tracks from his Youtube project "REC-nZk", which consists in re-arrange versions from his previous works. It was announced that the limited version of the album will contain the video footage from his concert "LIVE “BEST OF VOCAL WORKS [nZk]" Side SawanoHiroyuki[nZk]".

On January 20, 2021, Sawano started to unveil tracks from the album via his official Twitter account, uploading a short video preview teasing the vocalist from each track and using the hashtag "nZk_iv". On January 22, 2021, he announced on his Twitter the first track off the album after the single. The song, "Till I" featuring Japanese singer Yuuri, is a re-arranged version of "Till I Die" from the anime series Kill La Kill. On January 29, 2021, the song "FAVE" featuring Aina the End from the Japanese group Bish was announced on his Twitter. On February 5, 2021, the song "FLAW(LESS)" featuring Japanese singer Yosh from the group Survive Said The Prophet was announced on his Twitter. The last teaser was released on February 8, 2021, on his Twitter account, announcing the song "Abura" featuring the Japanese singer Taiiku Okazaki. On February 26, 2021, Sawano uploaded on his Youtube account a video digest, showing previews for all the tracks from the album.

== Track listing ==
All music is composed by Hiroyuki Sawano

No.	Title	Lyrics	Performed by	Length
1.	"IV"	Yosh	SawanoHiroyuki[nZk]	1:25
2.	"FLAW(LESS)"	Yosh	SawanoHiroyuki[nZk]:Yosh	4:00
3.	"FAVE"	cAnON.	SawanoHiroyuki[nZk]:AiNA THE END	3:53
4.	"Chaos Drifters"	Jean-Ken Johnny	SawanoHiroyuki[nZk]:Jean-Ken Johnny	3:49
5.	"N0VA"	naNami	SawanoHiroyuki[nZk]:naNami	3:41
6.	"Tranquility"	Benjamin; mpi	SawanoHiroyuki[nZk]:Anly	4:43
7.	"time"	cAnON.	SawanoHiroyuki[nZk]:ReoNa	3:58
8.	"Trollz"	Benjamin; mpi	SawanoHiroyuki[nZk]:Laco	3:28
9.	"Till I"	cAnON.	SawanoHiroyuki[nZk]:Yuuri	4:41
10.	"Felidae <iv ver.>"	Benjamin; mpi	SawanoHiroyuki[nZk]:Gemie&Tielle	3:08
11.	"CRY"	Hiroyuki Sawano; Benjamin; mpi	SawanoHiroyuki[nZk]:mizuki	4:25
12.	"Abura" (膏)	okazakitaiiku	SawanoHiroyuki[nZk]:okazakitaiiku	3:57
13.	"OUT OF "iv"		SawanoHiroyuki[nZk]	1:36
14.	"Barricades <MODv>"	Benjamin; mpi	SawanoHiroyuki[nZk]:Yosh	3:40
15.	"Keep on keeping on <MODv>"	Benjamin; mpi	SawanoHiroyuki[nZk]:mizuki	3:44
16.	"NEXUS <PODv>"	Benjamin; mpi	SawanoHiroyuki[nZk]:Laco	3:47
Total length:				57:55

== Charts ==
Chart (2021)	Peak position
Japanese Albums (Oricon)	9
Japan Hot Albums (Billboard)	7
Japan Top Albums Sales (Billboard)	8

== Personnel ==
- Hiroyuki Sawano
  - Piano (tracks 4.6–13.15)
  - Keyboards (tracks 1–14.16)
  - Backing Vocals (tracks 2.8.11.12)
  - All Other Instruments (all tracks)
- Yosh (Survive Said The Prophet)：Vocals (tracks 1.2.14)
- Aina The End (BiSH)：Vocals (track 3)
- Jean-Ken Johnny (MAN WITH A MISSION)：Vocals (track 4)
- naNami：Vocals (track 5)
- Anly：Vocals (track 6)
- ReoNa：Vocals (track 7)
- Laco
  - Vocals (tracks 8.16)
  - Backing Vocals (tracks 6.8)
- Yuuri：Vocals (track 9)
- Gemie & Tielle：Vocals (track 10)
- mizuki
  - Vocals (tracks 11.15)
  - Backing Vocals (track 11)
- Taiiku Okazaki：Vocals (track 12)
- Makoto Fujisaki：Drums (tracks 2.3.4.5.7.9.11.12.15)
- Toshino Tanabe
  - Bass (tracks 1–12.14.15)
  - Wood Bass (track 16)
- Harutoshi Ito
  - Guitars (tracks 2.3.5.6.7.9.10.11.12.14)
  - Cello (track 6)
- Hiroshi Iimuro
  - Guitars (tracks 4.8)
  - Acoustic Guitar (tracks 15.16)
- Yu“masshoi ”Yamauchi：Drums (track 6)
- Masashi Tsubakimoto
  - Electric Guitar (track 15)
  - Acoustic Guitar (track 16)
- Benjamin & mpi：Backing Vocals (tracks 2.8.11)
- cAnON.：Backing Vocals (tracks 2.8.11.12)
- Momoko：Backing Vocals (track 2)
- Rie：Backing Vocals (tracks 2.11.12)
- Akiko：Backing Vocals (tracks 2.8.11.12)
