= V (Hiroyuki Sawano album) =

Studio album by SawanoHiroyuki[nZk]
- Released: January 18, 2023
- Recorded: 2021–2022
- Studio: HeartBeat Recording (Setagaya, Tokyo); Higashi-Azabu (Minato, Tokyo); LAB Recorders (Minato, Tokyo); Sony Music (Nogizaka Station, Tokyo); MSR (Shibuya, Tokyo); Sound City (Minato, Tokyo); Sound Valley (Shinjuku, Tokyo); Victor (Shibuya, Tokyo)
- Genre: Pop; pop rock
- Length: 38:00
- Language: Japanese, English
- Label: Sacra Music
- Producer: Hiroyuki Sawano

SawanoHiroyuki[nZk] chronology
iv (2021)	V (2023)

Singles from V
- 1. "Avid" Released: April 25, 2021; 2. "Hands Up to the Sky" Released: June 9, 2021; 3. "LilaS" Released: March 20, 2022; 4. "Outsiders (Note: "Outsiders" is stylized as "OUTSIDERS".)" Released: April 10, 2022; 5. "Lemonade (Note: "Lemonade" is stylized as "LEMONADE".)" Released: December 21, 2022; 6. "FakeIt (Note: "FakeIt" is stylized as "FAKEit".)" Released: January 1, 2023

Alternative cover
- Instrumental edition cover

V is the fifth studio album by Hiroyuki Sawano's vocal project SawanoHiroyuki[nZk]. It was released on January 18, 2023, by Sacra Music. Five singles from the album include: "Avid", "Hands Up to the Sky", "LilaS", "Outsiders", and "Lemonade".

== Background ==
Various singles were released prior to the album announcement, the first one being "Avid / Hands Up to the Sky". The first track off the album, "Avid" with Japanese singer mizuki from the band UNIDOTS, was released on April 25, 2021, as a pre-order track from the single and was used as the 1st ending theme for the TV anime series 86 -Eighty Six-. A music video was released on May 29, 2021.

The second track off the album, "Hands Up to the Sky", featuring the Japanese singer Laco, was used as the second ending theme for the TV anime series 86 -Eighty Six- and was released on June 9, 2021. A music video was released on June 12, 2021.

The third single off the album, "LilaS", was announced to be a collaboration with Japanese singer Honoka Takahashi from the band Regal Lily. It was released on March 20, 2022, and was used as the fourth and last ending theme for TV anime series 86 -Eighty Six-. The animation used on the episode was released on Sawano's Official YouTube Channel.

The fourth track off the album, "Outsiders", featuring the Japanese singers Junki Kono and Sho Yonashiro from the Japanese boy band JO1, was used as the ending theme for the TV anime series Fanfare of Adolescence and was released on April 10, 2022. The music video was released on the same day.

On June 10, 2022, Japanese singer Aska announced on his official blog that he had collaborated on a song by Sawano but no further details were revealed. On November 11, 2022, Aska revealed the name of the song, being Chikyū to Iu Na no Miyako (地球という名の都; lit. 'A City Called Earth').

On November 19, 2022, Sawano announced V on Twitter and his official website and that it would include the four tracks previously released. He also revealed that he would work on the anime movie The Seven Deadly Sins: Grudge of Edinburgh as theme song composer with the song "Lemonade", sung by Japanese singer XAI.

On November 29, 2022, Sawano started to unveil tracks from the album via his official Twitter account, uploading a short video preview teasing the vocalist from each track, using the hashtag "nZk_v" and these teasers were uploaded every Tuesday before the release.

On December 1, 2022, Chikyū to Iu Na no Miyako (地球という名の都; lit. 'A City Called Earth') with ASKA was officially announced by Sawano on his Twitter with a short audio teaser and comments from both musicians about how was the creative process for the song.

On December 8, 2022, the song "Balk" with singer suis from Japanese rock duo Yorushika was announced in Sawano's Twitter.

On December 15, 2022, the song "7th String" with Japanese singer ReN was announced on Sawano's Twitter following the V teasers.

On December 21, 2022, the song "Lemonade" with Japanese singer XAI was released on streaming services along with the premiere of the movie The Seven Deadly Sins: Grudge of Edinburgh. Along with the release announcement, another track was added to the album tracklist, "Colors" with Japanese singer Motohiro Hata.

On December 26, 2022, the song "Colors" with Japanese singer Motohiro Hata was announced in Sawano's twitter. In the comments about the collaboration of this song, Sawano stated that he was able to work with Motohiro as they were involved in the production for the anime film One Piece Red. The song will have a short anime film with the same name, produced by Tetsuro Araki and animated by WIT Studio.

On December 31, 2022, it was announced during the broadcast for the Fate Project for New's Eve 2022 that Sawano produced the theme song for the TV special Fate/Strange Fake: Whispers of Dawn. The song called "Fake It" with Japanese singer Laco was released on January 1, 2023. Along with the announcement, the tracklist was published.

On January 5, 2023, it was announced that an instrumental version of the album titled V -instrumental- would be released digitally on the same day of the album's release.

== Musical style ==
When creating an album, Sawano stated that he not always start with a concept in mind. Instead, he primarily creates what they want to at that time.

Sawano has described the album to be more focused on overseas sound, specifically on EDM-rhythms and Synthpop, rather than the previous albums which were more focused on a Rock sound. Even though the album was created with this style in mind, "FakeIt" is a rock song with electronic rhythms in the background and is the only song with this style on the album.

In regards to the lyrics, Sawano has said that he often uses English lyrics, but this is solely to create a groove. Therefore, rather than wanting the pronunciation to be perfect, he is more interested in hearing how the melody sounds when it is sung in English.

When he decided to work with suis from Yorushika, he had two songs that he felt were suitable for her: a ballad and an upbeat song. In an interview, suis stated she decided to sing "Balk", the upbeat song, as she felt it was a one-time opportunity.

When asked about "7th String" and the collaboration with ReN, Sawano stated that he composed the song in his twenties, and when he heard Ren's voice, he thought it was fitting for him to sing it.

== Track listing ==
All music is composed by Hiroyuki Sawano.

V standard edition
No.	Title	Lyrics	Performed by	Length
1.	"IiIiI"		SawanoHiroyuki[nZk] (Note: Vocals by Benjamin, mpi, Laco)	2:04
2.	"FakeIt"	Benjamin; cAnON.	SawanoHiroyuki[nZk]:Laco	2:54
3.	"Lemonade"	Benjamin; cAnON.	SawanoHiroyuki[nZk]:XAI	2:49
4.	"Balk (Note: "Balk" is stylized as "B∀LK".)"	cAnON.	SawanoHiroyuki[nZk]:suis from Yorushika	2:41
5.	"7th String"	Benjamin; cAnON.	SawanoHiroyuki[nZk]:ReN	4:47
6.	"Outsiders"	Benjamin; cAnON.	SawanoHiroyuki[nZk]:Junki Kono & Sho Yonashiro from JO1	2:50
7.	"Hands Up to the Sky"	cAnON.	SawanoHiroyuki[nZk]:Laco	3:29
8.	"LilaS"	Honoka Takahashi	SawanoHiroyuki[nZk]:Honoka Takahashi	4:06
9.	"Avid"	cAnON.	SawanoHiroyuki[nZk]:mizuki	4:09
10.	"Colors (Note: "Colors" is stylized as "COLORs".)"	cAnON.	SawanoHiroyuki[nZk]:Motohiro Hata	2:51
11.	"Chikyū to Iu Na no Miyako (地球という名の都)"	ASKA	SawanoHiroyuki[nZk]:ASKA	3:30
12.	"V"		SawanoHiroyuki[nZk]	1:50
Total length:				38:00

V instrumental edition
No.	Title	Length
1.	"IiIiI" (instrumental)	2:04
2.	"FakeIt" (instrumental)	2:54
3.	"Lemonade" (instrumental)	2:49
4.	"Balk" (instrumental)	2:41
5.	"7th String" (instrumental)	4:47
6.	"Outsiders" (instrumental)	2:50
7.	"Hands Up to the Sky" (instrumental)	3:29
8.	"LilaS" (instrumental)	4:06
9.	"Avid" (instrumental)	4:09
10.	"Colors" (instrumental)	2:51
11.	"Chikyū to Iu Na no Miyako (地球という名の都)" (instrumental)	3:30
12.	"V"	1:50
Total length:		38:00

== Charts ==
Chart performance for V
Chart (2023)	Peak position
Japanese Albums (Oricon)	9
Japanese Digital Albums (Oricon)	3
Japanese Hot Albums (Billboard Japan)	7
