= Remember (Hiroyuki Sawano album) =

R∃/MEMBER

Studio album by SawanoHiroyuki[nZk]
- Released: March 6, 2019
- Recorded: 2018–2019
- Studio: ABS Recording; HeartBeat. Recording Studio; LAB Recorders; Studio Sound Dali; Studio Greenbird; SoundCity Studio; Studio Sound Valley; Victor Studio
- Genre: Pop; pop rock
- Length: 49:55
- Label: Sacra Music
- Producer: Hiroyuki Sawano

SawanoHiroyuki[nZk] chronology
2V-ALK (2017)	R∃/MEMBER (2019)	iv (2021)

Singles from R∃/MEMBER
- 1. "Binary Star" Released: April 25, 2018; 2. "Cage" Released: April 25, 2018; 3. "narrative" Released: November 28, 2018; 4. "NOISEofRAIN" Released: November 28, 2018

Remember (stylized as R∃/MEMBER) is the third studio album by Hiroyuki Sawano's vocal project SawanoHiroyuki[nZk]. It was released on March 6, 2019, by Sacra Music. Four singles were released from the album: "Binary Star", "Cage", "narrative" and "NOISEofRAIN".

== Background ==
"Binary Star" was used at the opening theme for the anime Legend of the Galactic Heroes: Die Neue These – Encounter, while "Cage" was used at the theme song for the life-sized Unicorn Gundam statue from Mobile Suit Gundam Unicorn.

"narrative" was used as the theme song for the anime film Mobile Suit Gundam Narrative.

"ME & CREED <nZkv>" was revealed to be used as the theme song for the then-upcoming mobile game Blue Exorcist: Damned Chord. The game was later cancelled.

== Track listing ==
All music is composed by Hiroyuki Sawano

No.	Title	Lyrics	Performed by	Length
1.	"Glory -into the RM-"	Yosh	SawanoHiroyuki[nZk]:SUGIZO	5:07
2.	"EVERCHiLD"	Sawano	SawanoHiroyuki[nZk]:Akihito Okano	4:25
3.	"never gonna change"	Sawano	SawanoHiroyuki[nZk]:Sukima Switch	4:02
4.	"narrative"	Sawano	SawanoHiroyuki[nZk]:LiSA	4:20
5.	"i-mage"	Sawano	SawanoHiroyuki[nZk]:Aimer	5:46
6.	"NOISEofRAIN"	Sawano; cAnON.	SawanoHiroyuki[nZk]:Takanori Nishikawa	4:08
7.	"Binary Star"	Benjamin; mpi	SawanoHiroyuki[nZk]:Uru	4:43
8.	"ME & CREED ᐸnZkvᐳ"	Sawano	SawanoHiroyuki[nZk]:Sayuri	3:26
9.	"Unti-L"	Sawano	SawanoHiroyuki[nZk]:ASCA	4:03
10.	"Cage"	Benjamin; mpi	SawanoHiroyuki[nZk]:Tielle	4:46
11.	"REMEMBER"	Sawano; Benjamin; mpi	SawanoHiroyuki[nZk]	5:09
Total length:				49:55

Sample credits

- "Binary Star" features a sample from "Nothing's Gonna Stop Us Now" written by Albert Hammond and Diane Warren and performed by Starship.

== Charts ==
Chart (2019)	Peak position
Japanese Albums (Oricon)	6
Japan Hot Albums (Billboard)	4
Japan Top Albums Sales (Billboard)	5

== Credits ==
Adapted from booklet.

Production
- Hiroyuki Sawano – producer, arranger
- Mitsunori Aizawa – recording engineer, mixing engineer & Pro Tools operator
- Junpei Ohno – recording engineer (only on track #1)
- Yasuhiko Miyasaka – recording engineer (only on track #2)
- Hiromitsu Takasu – recording engineer (only on track #4)
- Masatake Ohsato – recording engineer (only on track #6)
- Ayaka Toki – recording engineer (only on track #8)
- Satoshi Morishige – recording engineer (only on track #9)
- Eriko Ijima – assistant engineer
- Yosuke Maeda – assistant engineer
- Hiroshi Manabe – assistant engineer
- Ayumu Musha – assistant engineer
- Sora Tamiya – assistant engineer
- Yuji Chinone – mastering
- Ryotaro Kawashima – art direction & design
- Taichi Nishimaki – photographer
- Junko Fukuda – hair & make-up
- Yuka Moriyama – Stylist for cover
- Reina Chida – products coordination
- Toru Takeuchi – A&R in chief
- Tomoyo Yamazaki – A&R
- Koichi Baba – A&R
- SME Records Promotion Room – media promotion
- Yu Tsuzuki – sales promotion
- Keiichi Tonomura – supervise
- VV-ALKLINE Inc. – management
- Daisuke Katsurada – executive producer
Vocals
- Aimer – vocals (track #5)
- Akihito Okano – vocals (track #2)
- ASCA – vocals (track #9)
- Gemie – vocals (track #11), background vocals (track #1, 2, 3, 5, 7, 8, 11)
- LiSA – vocals (track #4)
- mizuki – vocals (track #11)
- naNami – vocals (track #11), background vocals (track #8)
- Sayuri – vocals (track #8)
- Takanori Nishikawa – vocals (track #6)
- Takuya Ohashi – vocals (track #3)
- Tielle – vocals (tracks #10, 11), background vocals (track #1, 2, 3, 5)
- Uru – vocals (track #7)
- Yosh – vocals (tracks #1, 11)
- Hiroyuki Sawano – background vocals (tracks #1, 2, 3, 5, 7, 8, 11)
- Akiko – background vocals (tracks #1, 2, 3, 5, 8, 11)
- Benjamin – background vocals (tracks #1, 2, 3, 5, 7, 8, 11)
- Miho Matsumoto – background vocals (track #8)
- mpi – background vocals (tracks #1, 2, 3, 5, 7, 8, 11)
- Rie – background vocals (track #7)
- Ruka – background vocals (track #7)

Instruments

- Harutoshi Ito – guitar (tracks #2, 3, 5, 7, 8, 9, 10, 11)
- Hiroyuki Sawano – piano (tracks #1, 2, 4–11), keyboards (all tracks), all other instruments (all tracks)
- Hiroshi Iimuro – guitar (tracks #1, 3–4, 6)
- Koichiro Muroya – violin (track #4)
- Koichiro Muroya Strings – strings (track #7)
- Shintaro Tokita – piano (track #3)
- SUGIZO – violin (track #1)
- Toshino Tanabe – bass (all tracks)
- Yu "masshoi" Yamauchi – drums (all tracks)
