= 2V-ALK =

Studio album by SawanoHiroyuki[nZk]
- Released: 20 September 2017
- Studio: Studio Sound Valley; HeartBeat. Recording Studio; Studio GreenBird; LAB Recorders; Sound City Annex; Sound City Setagaya; ABS Recording
- Genre: Pop; pop rock
- Length: 68:48
- Label: SACRA MUSIC
- Producer: Hiroyuki Sawano

SawanoHiroyuki[nZk] chronology
o1 (2015)	2V-ALK (2017)	R∃/MEMBER (2019)

Singles from 2V-ALK
- 1. "Into the Sky" Released: 26 June 2016; 2. "CRYst-Alise" Released: 8 July 2016; 3. "e of s" Released: 30 December 2016; 4. "gravityWall" Released: 28 June 2017; 5. "sh0ut" Released: 28 June 2017; 6. "Club Ki3ε" Released: 29 August 2017 (promotional)

2V-ALK (pronounced "walk") is the second studio album by Hiroyuki Sawano's vocal project SawanoHiroyuki[nZk]. It was released on September 20, 2017, through the Sony Music label SACRA MUSIC. 2V-ALK was proceeded by the singles "Into the Sky", "CRYst-Alise", "e of s", "gravityWall" and "sh0ut".

The album charted at #3 in the daily ranks for the first week. It charted for 8 weeks in the Oricon charts.

== Background ==
"Into the Sky" was used in the anime series Mobile Suit Gundam Unicorn RE:0096 as the opening theme, while "Next 2 U -eUC-" was used as the first ending theme.

"CRYst-Alise" was used as the main theme for the mobile game VALHAITRISING.

"e of s" was used as the opening theme for the mobile game Soul Reverse Zero, while "ninelie <cry-v>" was used as the ending theme for the first Kabaneri of the Iron Fortress compilation film.

"gravityWall" was used as the first opening theme for the anime television series Re:Creators, while "sh0ut" was used as the second opening theme.

"Amazing Trees" was used as the opening theme for the PS4 game Border Break.

== Track listing ==
All music is composed by Hiroyuki Sawano.

No.	Title	Lyrics	Performed by	Length
1.	"1ntr0duct10n"		SawanoHiroyuki[nZk]	1:59
2.	"Amazing Trees"	Hiroyuki Sawano; Benjamin; mpi	SawanoHiroyuki[nZk]:Tielle	4:46
3.	"gravityWall"	Hiroyuki Sawano; Tielle	SawanoHiroyuki[nZk]:Tielle & Gemie	3:46
4.	"e of s"	Hiroyuki Sawano	SawanoHiroyuki[nZk]:mizuki	3:50
5.	"Club Ki3ε"	Benjamin; mpi	SawanoHiroyuki[nZk]:Gemie	3:57
6.	"VV-ALK"	Hiroyuki Sawano; cAnON.	SawanoHiroyuki[nZk]:Tielle	4:22
7.	"rabBIThole"	Yosh	SawanoHiroyuki[nZk]:Yosh	3:59
8.	"ninelie <cry-v>"	Hiroyuki Sawano	SawanoHiroyuki[nZk]:Aimer	5:06
9.	"sh0ut"	Hiroyuki Sawano; Tielle	SawanoHiroyuki[nZk]:Tielle & Gemie	4:05
10.	"ViEW"	Hiroyuki Sawano; cAnON.	SawanoHiroyuki[nZk]:mizuki	3:30
11.	"mio MARE <2v-alk_v>"	cAnON.	SawanoHiroyuki[nZk]:Yosh	4:22
12.	"CRYst-Alise"	cAnON.	SawanoHiroyuki[nZk]:Tielle	5:15
13.	"Next 2 U -eUC-"	Hiroyuki Sawano; cAnON.	SawanoHiroyuki[nZk]:naNami	4:04
14.	"HERE I AM <2v-alk_v>"	Hiroyuki Sawano; cAnON.	SawanoHiroyuki[nZk]:Gemie	4:01
15.	"Into the Sky"	Benjamin; mpi	SawanoHiroyuki[nZk]:Tielle	3:50
16.	"pian0s0l0"		SawanoHiroyuki[nZk]	3:54
17.	"ëmot1on"	cAnON.	SawanoHiroyuki[nZk]:Eliana	4:12
Total length:				68:48

== Credits ==
Adapted from Booklet.

Production
- Hiroyuki Sawano – arranger, producer, programming
- Yasushi Horiguchi – executive producer
- Daisuke Katsurada – executive producer
- Mitsunori Aizawa – recording, mixing engineer & Pro Tools operator
- Kozo Miyamoto – assistant engineer
- Hideto Matsumoto – assistant engineer
- Masakatsu Mizuno – assistant engineer
- Kosuke Abe – assistant engineer
- Eriko Iijima – assistant engineer
- Yosuke Maeda – assistant engineer
- Keisuke Narita – assistant engineer
- Yota Ishizuka – assistant engineer
- Kei Izawa – assistant engineer
- Kazuaki Takanishi – assistant engineer
- Erika Shimada – assistant engineer
- Yuji Chinone – mastering
- Ryotaro Kawashima – art direction & design
- Kiyoaki Sasahara – photographer
- Aya Murakami – hair & make-up
- Yuko Mori – products coordination
- Toru Takeuchi – a&r
- Anna Komatsuzaki – a&r
- SME Records Promotion Room – media promotion
- Yukihiro Sato – sales promotion
- Kei Yamamoto – digital promotion
- Kazuto Fushimi – digital promotion
- Keiichi Tonomura – supervise
Vocals
- Aimer – vocals (track 8)
- Eliana Silva – vocals (track 17)
- Gemie – vocals (tracks 3, 5, 9, 14)
- mizuki – vocals, background vocals (tracks 4, 10)
- naNami – vocals (track 13)
- Tielle – vocals (tracks 2, 3, 6, 9, 12, 15), background vocals (track 6)
- Yosh Morita – vocals (tracks 7, 11)
- Hiroyuki Sawano – background vocals (tracks 4, 6, 10, 17)
- Anna Komatsuzaki – background vocals (tracks 6, 10)
- Akiko Shimodoi – background vocals (tracks 4, 17)
- cAnON. – background vocals (tracks 10, 17)
- Hajime – background vocals (tracks 4, 6, 10, 17)
- Kohta Yamamoto – background vocals (track 4)
- Yasushi "yassh!!" Horiguchi – background vocals (tracks 4, 17)

Instruments

- Harutoshi Ito – cello (tracks 1, 12, 17), guitar (tracks 1, 6–8, 10–13, 15, 17)
- Hiroyuki Sawano – piano (tracks 1, 2, 3, 4, 6–13, 15, 16, 17), keyboards (tracks 2–14, 15, 17), all other instruments (all tracks)
- Hiroshi Iimuro – guitar (tracks 2–4, 9, 13)
- Masashi Tsubakimoto – guitar (tracks 1, 5, 14)
- Toshino Tanabe – bass (tracks 1–4, 6–13, 15)
- Yu "masshoi" Yamauchi – drums (tracks 1–4, 6–10, 12–13, 15)
