= Attack on Titan season 1 =

First season of the anime television series (2013)

Attack on Titan
- Season 1
- No. of episodes: 25

Release
- Original network: MBS TV
- Original release: April 7 – September 29, 2013

Season chronology
- Next → Season 2

The first season of the Attack on Titan anime television series was produced by IG Port's Wit Studio, with production assistance by Production I.G, and directed by Tetsurō Araki, with Yasuko Kobayashi handling series composition and Kyōji Asano providing character designs. It covers the first story arcs (chapters 1–34) from the original manga by Hajime Isayama. It was originally broadcast on MBS TV from April 7 to September 29, 2013, and later aired on Tokyo MX, FBS, TOS, HTB, TV Aichi, BS11, and other JNN stations nationwide. Both Funimation and Crunchyroll have streamed the series with subtitles on their respective websites. Funimation also licensed the anime for home video release in 2014. Episode 1 of Funimation's English dubbed version premiered at Anime Boston, with other episodes put on Funimation's subscription services. In the United States, the dub of the series was broadcast weekly on Adult Swim's Toonami programming block starting on May 3, 2014, at 11:30 p.m. EDT.

Attack on Titan is set in a world where humanity lives inside cities surrounded by enormous walls due to the Titans, gigantic humanoid beings who devour humans. The story follows the adventures of Eren Jaeger and his childhood friends Mikasa Ackerman and Armin Arlert, whose lives are changed forever after a Colossal Titan breaches the wall of their home town. Vowing revenge and to reclaim the world from the Titans, Eren and his friends join the Scout Regiment, an elite group of soldiers who fight Titans.

The score is composed by Hiroyuki Sawano. The opening theme song for the season's first 13 episodes is "Feuerroter Pfeil und Bogen" (紅蓮の弓矢, Guren no Yumiya; lit. "Crimson Bow and Arrow") by Linked Horizon, and the ending theme is "Utsukushiki Zankoku na Sekai" (美しき残酷な世界; lit. "A Beautiful Cruel World") by Yōko Hikasa. For the rest of the season, the opening theme is "Die Flügel der Freiheit" (自由の翼, Jiyū no Tsubasa; lit. "The Wings of Freedom") also by Linked Horizon and the ending theme is "Great Escape" by Cinema Staff. The opening themes were collected on Linked Horizon's single "Jiyū e no Shingeki" which sold over 100,000 copies in its first week of sales.

== Episodes ==
No. overall	No. in season	Title	Directed by	Written by	Original release date	English air date
1	1	"To You, in 2000 Years: The Fall of Shiganshina, Part 1"; Transliteration: "Nisennen-go no Kimi e -Shiganshina Kanraku (1)-" (Japanese: 二千年後の君へ ―シガンシナ陥落①―)	Hiroyuki Tanaka, Tetsurō Araki	Yasuko Kobayashi	April 7, 2013	May 3, 2014
For over a century, humans have been living in settlements surrounded by three 50-meter gigantic walls, Wall Maria, Wall Rose and Wall Sina, which prevent the Titans, giant humanoid creatures who eat humans, from entering. Eren Jaeger, of the town called the Shiganshina District, wishes to see the outside world by joining the Scout Regiment, as he likens living in the cities to being like livestock. His resolve impresses his father Grisha Jaeger, who promises to show him what lies in their basement once he returns. Things change when the Colossal Titan, a giant 60-meter Titan taller than regular ones, appears and destroys the gate, allowing smaller Titans to enter. As the town erupts into mass panic, Eren and his friend Mikasa Ackerman find Eren's mother Carla Jaeger pinned under their collapsed house. A Smiling Titan approaches and Carla begs them to flee. City guard Hannes promises Carla to protect the kids. As he flees carrying them, Eren watches in horror as the Smiling Titan eats his mother.
2	2	"That Day: The Fall of Shiganshina, Part 2"; Transliteration: "Sono Hi -Shiganshina Kanraku (2)-" (Japanese: その日 ―シガンシナ陥落②―)	Masashi Koizuka	Yasuko Kobayashi	April 14, 2013	May 10, 2014
Hannes apologizes to Eren for being unable to save Carla. He is able to escape to the inner Wall Maria with Eren and Mikasa but the Armored Titan breaches that Wall as well, causing those inside to retreat even further, behind Wall Rose. Eren has a strange dream in which his grieving father forcefully gives him an injection and a key. Angry and bitter, Eren grows disgusted with the people of Wall Rose when they show disdain for sharing their food and resources with the refugees. During the next year, as a food shortage becomes apparent, the government sends about 250,000 refugees, 20% of the populace, to fight to reclaim Wall Maria, only to be wiped out by the Titans. Eren vows to eradicate the Titans and joins the army; Mikasa and his other best friend Armin Arlert join with him.
3	3	"A Dim Light Amid Despair: Humanity's Comeback, Part 1"; Transliteration: "Zetsubō no Naka de Nibuku Hikaru -Jinrui no Saiki (1)-" (Japanese: 絶望の中で鈍く光る ―人類の再起①―)	Kiyoshi Fukumoto	Hiroshi Seko	April 21, 2013	May 17, 2014
The drill instructor Keith Sadies inspects the new recruits of the 104th Cadet Corps. Eren develops a rivalry with Jean Kirschtein, who desires a safe and easy position in the Military Police Regiment within the inner city walls, as they do not have to fight Titans or go on expeditions outside like the Scout Regiment. The recruits train on an omni-directional mobility gear apparatus, where they have to balance themselves while suspended on cables. After Eren has trouble balancing, he asks Reiner Braun and Bertholdt Hoover for help and learns that they, like him, are among the few who have personally encountered Titans. Keith discovers that Eren's apparatus was defective and passes him after a retry with working equipment.
4	4	"The Night of the Closing Ceremony: Humanity's Comeback, Part 2"; Transliteration: "Kaisan Shiki no Yoru -Jinrui no Saiki (2)-" (Japanese: 解散式の夜 ―人類の再起②―)	Makoto Bessho	Yasuko Kobayashi	April 28, 2013	May 24, 2014
It's been five years since Wall Maria fell. Keith evaluates the recruits for their strengths and weaknesses. After training in hand-to-hand combat with Annie Leonhart, Eren learns that Jean and several other recruits still hope to join the Military Police Regiment to avoid having to fight Titans. On graduation day, Eren and Mikasa rank among the top ten of their class. They are eligible to join the cushy Military Police Regiment, but Eren joins the Scout Regiment on the front lines, leading Armin and Mikasa to join him, though he tries to dissuade them. The trio is assigned to the Trost District, one of the cities at the outer edge of Wall Rose. The Colossal Titan breaches the gate, shocking Eren and his classmates.
5	5	"First Battle: The Struggle for Trost, Part 1"; Transliteration: "Uijin -Torosuto-ku Kōbōsen (1)-" (Japanese: 初陣 ―トロスト区攻防戦①―)	Shinpei Ezaki	Hiroshi Seko	May 5, 2013	May 31, 2014
The Colossal Titan vanishes in a burst of steam before Eren can attack. The Military Police Regiment scrambles to evacuate the people of the Trost District and set up defenses. With the Titans now in the city, Eren recalls his lessons: in order to kill a Titan, they must strike the nape of its neck. In the chaos, Eren and Armin's comrades are killed or eaten by the Titans, with Eren himself losing his left leg when he attacks in haste. Armin, paralyzed with fear, is picked up by a Bearded Titan. Eren manages to pull him out of the Bearded Titan's mouth and reaches for Armin, but the Bearded Titan closes its jaws, severing Eren's left arm and swallowing him.
6	6	"The World the Girl Saw: The Struggle for Trost, Part 2"; Transliteration: "Shōjo ga Mita Sekai -Torosuto-ku Kōbōsen (2)-" (Japanese: 少女が見た世界 ―トロスト区攻防戦②―)	Tomomi Ikeda	Hiroshi Seko	May 12, 2013	June 7, 2014
Armin awakens to find himself surrounded by Conny Springer, Christa Lenz and Ymir, blaming himself for Eren's fate. An Abnormal Titan approaches the city gate, which is crowded by refugees. Mikasa kills it with her atypical, powerful prowess, saving everyone. A flashback to the year 844, a year before the fall of Wall Maria, shows that Mikasa's family was targeted by three slave traders, who murdered her parents. Grisha and Eren discovered the corpses during a visit and Eren tracked down the slave traders to a nearby hut and killed two of them to save Mikasa. The third slave trader began strangling him. Encouraged by Eren, Mikasa overcame her fear and gained resolve to kill the slave trader. Grisha took Mikasa in, and she now considers the Jaegers family.
7	7	"Small Blade: The Struggle for Trost, Part 3"; Transliteration: "Chiisana Yaiba -Torosuto-ku Kōbōsen (3)-" (Japanese: 小さな刃 ―トロスト区攻防戦③―)	Yuzuru Tachikawa	Hiroshi Seko	May 19, 2013	June 14, 2014
The surviving squads, unable to reach the inner walls due to their omni-directional mobility gear being low on gas, lose their fighting spirit as the headquarters and supply depot are overrun by Titans. Mikasa learns from Armin that Eren is dead. She rallies the others to reclaim the supply depot by taking down the Titans but runs out of gas and falls into an alley. Jean assumes command, but loses his nerve momentarily when he sees his comrades being eaten. He eventually makes a judgement call, leading his surviving team members to headquarters. As a Titan approaches Mikasa, a mysterious, black-haired Titan appears and brutally kills it, much to her confusion. Armin, Conny, and Mikasa are shocked to witness the mysterious Titan not only fighting other Titans, but showing knowledge of their weak point and using hand-to-hand combat, while ignoring the humans. Armin gives Mikasa his gas tanks and blades so she can support the others, but she is unwilling to leave him behind.
8	8	"I Can Hear His Heartbeat: The Struggle for Trost, Part 4"; Transliteration: "Shinzō no Kodō ga Kikoeru -Torosuto-ku Kōbōsen (4)-" (Japanese: 心臓の鼓動が聞こえる ―トロスト区攻防戦④―)	Satonobu Kikuchi, Shinpei Ezaki, Tatsuma Minamikawa	Noboru Takagi	May 26, 2013	June 21, 2014
With the supply depot swarming with Titans, Armin has the idea of luring the mysterious Titan there to defeat them. His plan works, but while the mysterious Titan is able to kill the enemy Titans outside, seven smaller Titans are in the fuel storage area. With their equipment out of fuel, Armin devises another plan. The survivors shoot the Titans in the eyes to blind them, while seven others jump to finish them off. This, too, is successful and having replenished their fuel, the soldiers prepare to retreat. Everyone is surprised to see the Titans attacking and cannibalizing the mysterious Titan, who defeats them before collapsing. They watch in shock as Eren emerges from its body, alive. Armin realizes that Eren's severed leg and arm have somehow regenerated.
9	9	"Whereabouts of His Left Arm: The Struggle for Trost, Part 5"; Transliteration: "Hidariude no Yukue -Torosuto-ku Kōbōsen (5)-" (Japanese: 左腕の行方 ―トロスト区攻防戦⑤―)	Yoshiyuki Fujiwara	Yasuko Kobayashi	June 2, 2013	June 28, 2014
Captain Levi of the Scout Regiment and his squad are on a mission retaking a town from the Titans, but are called to the Trost District when the Titans invade. When Eren was swallowed alive by the Bearded Titan, he found himself in its stomach with the bodies of its victims. His rage at the Titans caused him to burst out of the Bearded Titan's stomach by transforming into a Titan himself and going on a rampage. Eren's comrades, who witnessed him emerge, agree to keep it a secret; however, Kitts also witnessed him and hysterically orders the cannons to fire on Eren, and Armin and Mikasa, who are shielding him. Eren recalls memories of his father giving him an injection to make him lose his memories, telling him the key around his neck will help him remember, and that he must go to their home's basement with the key, as the information they need is there. Eren remembers how to transform—by biting his hand—and protects his friends from the explosion by partially transforming into a Titan, sheltering them inside his ribs.
10	10	"Response: The Struggle for Trost, Part 6"; Transliteration: "Kotaeru -Torosuto-ku Kōbōsen (6)-" (Japanese: 応える ―トロスト区攻防戦⑥―)	Hiroyuki Tanaka	Hiroshi Seko	June 9, 2013	July 12, 2014
Eren detaches himself from his Titan's body and climbs out, telling Mikasa and Armin about the basement in his old, destroyed house. His father was working on a secret project there and he believes that it holds the secret to mankind's preservation and destroying the Titans. As the cannons are reloaded for another attack, Eren comes up with two escape plans. The first is for him to flee as a Titan and journey to his old house but criminalize himself, and the second is to have Armin convince Kitts that he is an asset to humanity and the military rather than a danger. Armin decides on the second. However, Kitts is overcome by fear and gives the order to fire. As the trio prepares to defend themselves, the order is halted by Commander Dot Pyxis, as he wants to hear Armin out. Pyxis guarantees their safety in return for Eren's Titan to block the destroyed gate in Wall Rose to prevent more Titans from getting in. Eren agrees to try, regardless of whether or not he will be able to.
11	11	"Idol: The Struggle for Trost, Part 7"; Transliteration: "Gūzō -Torosuto-ku Kōbōsen (7)-" (Japanese: 偶像 ―トロスト区攻防戦⑦―)	Kiyoshi Fukumoto	Hiroshi Seko	June 16, 2013	July 19, 2014
As Armin helps Pyxis's subordinates coordinate a plan, morale among the troops begin to drop at the thought of facing the Titans again. Pyxis reminds them that if they abandon their posts, they will be subjecting their families to the same terror they faced; this convinces the troops to stay. Claiming that Eren is the result of a secret project to turn humans into Titans, Pyxis plans to have most of the troops gather at a far corner of the Trost District to lure most of the Titans away while Eren as a Titan is posted on the opposite end to carry the giant boulder to seal the hole. Eren will be guarded during the mission by three of the best elites of the Garrison Regiment; Ian Dietrich, Rico Brzenska and Mitabi Jarnach, with Mikasa joining for her extraordinary skill. Reaching the boulder, Eren transforms into a Titan, only to turn and attack Mikasa.
12	12	"Wound: The Struggle for Trost, Part 8"; Transliteration: "Kizu -Torosuto-ku Kōbōsen (8)-" (Japanese: 傷 ―トロスト区攻防戦⑧―)	Shintaro Itoga	Noboru Takagi	June 23, 2013	July 26, 2014
Mikasa tries to reason with Eren's Titan form, but to no avail. He accidentally incapacitates himself, slumping to the ground. The elite squad protecting him sends up a red flare to signal that the plan has failed, to the dismay of the rest of the troops. As Armin heads toward Eren to investigate, the elite squad argues about withdrawing and abandoning him to the Titans but Captain Ian convinces them to protect him even while he is incapacitated, recognizing Eren's potential as a valuable asset. Jean's mobility gear malfunctions, forcing him to hide from Titans. Armin reaches the unconscious Eren and plunges his sword into the Titan's left arm, which briefly awakens Eren from the pain. As Armin speaks to him of their dream to see the outside world and his promise to kill all Titans, Eren leaves his dreamlike state and regains control.
13	13	"Primal Desire: The Struggle for Trost, Part 9"; Transliteration: "Genshoteki Yokkyū -Torosuto-ku Kōbōsen (9)-" (Japanese: 原初的欲求 ―トロスト区攻防戦⑨―)	Masashi Koizuka	Noboru Takagi	June 30, 2013	August 2, 2014
Jean escapes with Annie, Connie and Marco Bott's help. To everyone's surprise, Eren in his Titan form starts carrying the boulder toward the gate. Captain Ian orders everyone to protect him. As the soldiers fight off the Titans, Eren successfully blocks the gate. Rico fires a yellow flare to signal that the operation was a success. When Armin and Eren are cornered by two Titans, Levi saves them just in time. In the aftermath, all Titans remaining in the Trost District are eliminated and two are captured for research. The troops mourn the deaths of their comrades among the casualties incurred. Eren is chained in a jail cell guarded by the Military Police Regiment, where he is visited by Levi and Commander Erwin Smith of the Scout Regiment, who now hold Eren's key. Eren tells them about the basement; upon hearing that he wants to join the Scouts, Levi takes him into his squad, stating that he will take responsibility for Eren, but warns that he will kill him if Eren ever loses control.
14	14	"Can't Look into His Eyes Yet: Eve of the Counterattack, Part 1"; Transliteration: "Mada Me o Mirenai -Hangeki Zen'ya (1)-" (Japanese: まだ目を見れない ―反撃前夜①―)	Keisuke Onishi, Shinpei Ezaki	Yasuko Kobayashi	July 14, 2013	August 9, 2014
The populace is divided over whether Eren is their savior or their end. He is brought to a military tribunal where Commander-in-Chief Dhalis Zachary will decide whether he should be handed over to the Military Police Regiment or the Scout Regiment. The Military Police wants Eren executed, seeing him as a danger, while the Scout Regiment wants to use his ability to retake Wall Maria. Eren angrily calls out the Military Police for their cowardice and selfishness. Levi brutally beats him in retaliation; despite his anger, Eren does not transform as feared. Levi and Erwin use this to show that the Scouts can control him and kill him if need be. Thus, Zachary gives him to the Scout Regiment. Erwin and Levi make amends with Eren for beating him up, though Eren understands it was necessary to get him under the Scouts' supervision. As he is getting treatment, they are bewildered to see that the tooth Levi knocked out has already grown back.
15	15	"Special Operations Squad: Eve of the Counterattack, Part 2"; Transliteration: "Tokubetsu Sakusen-han -Hangeki Zen'ya (2)-" (Japanese: 特別作戦班 ―反撃前夜②―)	Kiyoshi Fukumoto	Hiroshi Seko	July 21, 2013	August 16, 2014
Levi and his Special Operations Squad, composed of Eld Gin, Oruo Bozad, Petra Rall and Günther Schultz, bring Eren to the old Scout Regiment headquarters, where he will learn to control his Titan powers under their watch. Erwin and Miche Zacharius discuss how they must prove Eren's usefulness to the Military within a month but Erwin hints that there is another reason for Eren's presence and the upcoming expedition. Hange asks Eren to help in experiments with the two Titans they've captured, which Hange named Sawney and Beane. It is revealed that Titans need sunlight to survive and their bodies are disproportionately light despite their size. The next day, the Scout Regiment discovers that Sawney and Beane have been killed and the culprit is likely a soldier themselves, which makes Eren wonder who their true enemy is.
16	16	"What Needs to Be Done Now: Eve of the Counterattack, Part 3"; Transliteration: "Ima, Nani o Subeki ka -Hangeki Zen'ya (3)-" (Japanese: 今、何をすべきか ―反撃前夜③―)	Keisuke Onishi, Yasushi Muroya	Yasuko Kobayashi	July 28, 2013	August 23, 2014
As the recruits are investigated over Sawney and Beane's deaths, Annie joins the Military Police Regiment. The 104th class of cadets are greeted by Erwin at the Decision Ceremony, where he informs them that the goal of the Scout Regiment's expedition next month is to reclaim Wall Maria so they can enter the Shiganshina District and uncover the secret in the basement of Eren's home. He tells them of the Scout Regiment's high mortality rate, since they are the military branch responsible for outside exploration and Titan combat. After hearing of this, most recruits leave to join the other branches. Jean, suffering from guilt and inner turmoil, joins the Scouts in honor of Marco; Mikasa, Armin, Reiner, Bertholdt, Conny, Sasha, Christa and Ymir also join. Thus, Eren is reunited with his friends after a while. The Scout Regiment embarks on their 57th Expedition beyond the walls.
17	17	"Female Titan: The 57th Exterior Scouting Mission, Part 1"; Transliteration: "Megata no Kyojin -Dai Gojū-Nana Kai Hekigai Chōsa (1)-" (Japanese: 女型の巨人 ―第57回壁外調査①―)	Daisuke Tokudo, Masashi Koizuka	Hiroshi Seko	August 4, 2013	September 6, 2014
As they begin the 57th Expedition, the Scout Regiment assembles into their Long-Range Scouting Formation, wherein they spread out in a semicircle around the main wagon train and signal by colored flare guns if Titans are nearby so the group can collectively alter course to avoid conflict if possible. Things get difficult when a Female Titan suddenly appears at high speed toward Armin's squad. Much to Armin's shock, this Titan is intelligent enough to kill his seniors and protect her neck. She captures Armin, but after seeing his face, inexplicably lets him go, causing Armin to realize that she is possibly a human with a Titan form like Eren. Armin is picked up by Reiner and Jean, who reveal that their right flank was wiped out by Titans. They realize that the Female Titan's target is Eren and try to stop her but fail.
18	18	"Forest of Giant Trees: The 57th Exterior Scouting Mission, Part 2"; Transliteration: "Kyodaiju no Mori -Dai Gojū-Nana Kai Hekigai Chōsa (2)-" (Japanese: 巨大樹の森 ―第57回壁外調査②―)	Hiroyuki Tanaka, Shin Wakabayashi	Hiroshi Seko	August 11, 2013	September 13, 2014
Armin, Reiner and Jean are left with only one horse after their encounter with the Female Titan. They are saved when Christa arrives with extra horses. To everyone's surprise, the operation is continuing, albeit heading in a different direction. News reaches the center group about the annihilation of their right flank by the Female Titan. The formation breaks entirely as the Scouts all reach the Forest of Giant Trees; only the center row enters while the rest defend the forest from Titans. Eren realizes something is wrong when he sees that no one in his squad has any idea of what they're doing or what Erwin's plan is, including Levi. As the Female Titan arrives at their heels, Levi tells his squad to cover their ears, preparing his flare gun.
19	19	"Bite: The 57th Exterior Scouting Mission, Part 3"; Transliteration: "Kamitsuku -Dai Gojū-Nana Kai Hekigai Chōsa (3)-" (Japanese: 噛み付く ―第57回壁外調査③―)	Kiyoshi Fukumoto, Tomomi Ikeda	Noboru Takagi	August 18, 2013	September 20, 2014
Levi fires a noise round and tells the squad to keep moving forward. With more of the rearguard being killed by the Female Titan, Eren begs his squad to let him fight, but they tell him to trust Levi's decision. Eren recalls when he was unable to transform into a Titan for experimental purposes for Hange and the squad. During a break, when he tried to pick up a fallen teaspoon, he unexpectedly partially transformed, leading the squad to panic and Hange to deduce that he is able to transform not by simply injuring himself but also when he has a specific goal in mind. The squad later apologized to Eren, telling him they should trust each other. Eren decides to trust in the current plan. It is revealed that Levi's squad is bait to lure the Female Titan into an ambush in the forest, where Erwin and his men fire hundreds of grappling hooks to trap her. Levi leaves to meet with Erwin to determine next steps.
20	20	"Erwin Smith: The 57th Exterior Scouting Mission, Part 4"; Transliteration: "Eruvin Sumisu -Dai Gojū-Nana Kai Hekigai Chōsa (4)" (Japanese: エルヴィン・スミス ―第57回壁外調査④―)	Shintaro Itoga	Yasuko Kobayashi	August 25, 2013	September 27, 2014
Though the Female Titan is restrained, the squad is unable to extract the human inside as she is able to crystallize her skin to prevent them from cutting her skin. Everyone realizes it was Erwin's plan to use Eren as bait to draw out the mole within the army who joined them after the Walls fell; that's why he kept the plan from all current members and only revealed it to those who were part of the Scout Regiment before the fall. The Female Titan suddenly hollers a scream that draws all Titans in the vicinity towards her. Despite the Scout's attempt to stop them, the Titans ignore them and eat the Female Titan's body in a frenzy. Thus, Erwin calls off the expedition. With no confirmation that the mole inside has also been eaten, Erwin orders Levi to replenish his gas and gear just in case before returning to his squad. The mole is indeed alive; disguised as a cloaked Scout Regiment member, they attack Levi's squad and kill Günther.
21	21	"Crushing Blow: The 57th Exterior Scouting Mission, Part 5"; Transliteration: "Tettsui -Dai Gojū-Nana Kai Hekigai Chōsa (5)-" (Japanese: 鉄槌 ―第57回壁外調査⑤―)	Hiroyuki Tanaka, Yasushi Muroya	Noboru Takagi	September 1, 2013	October 4, 2014
Erwin realizes it was a mistake to think that all intelligent Titans are like Eren, since the Female Titan has abilities far beyond that of a novice. The mole once again transforms into the Female Titan and chases after Levi's squad. Armin theorizes that the mole is someone who had seen Eren transform during the invasion of the Trost District. Eren wants to transform but the squad tells him to trust in their skills to protect him. Eld, Oruo, and Petra manage to blind the Titan; however, she regenerates her right eye and kills all three of them. Grieving and furious, Eren transforms into a Titan. Believing his squad's death could have been avoided if he'd transformed in the first place, he fights the Titan but she defeats him by beheading him and swallowing his human body. Mikasa attempts to intervene, but to no avail. Levi arrives, telling her to keep her distance, as the Female Titan is getting tired and they can take advantage.
22	22	"The Defeated: The 57th Exterior Scouting Mission, Part 6"; Transliteration: "Haisha-tachi -Dai Gojū-Nana Kai Hekigai Chōsa (6)-" (Japanese: 敗者達 ―第57回壁外調査⑥―)	Makoto Bessho, Shinpei Ezaki	Noboru Takagi	September 8, 2013	October 11, 2014
Levi debilitates the Female Titan at incredibly high speed so that she can't even crystallize her skin in time. He injures his leg when saving Mikasa but is able to retrieve Eren from the Female Titan's mouth, as she is now badly wounded and slumped against a tree. The Scout Regiment somberly retrieve the corpses of their fallen and begin the journey home. On the way, they are chased by two Titans. One is killed by Mikasa and they outrun the second after Levi orders them to dispose of the corpses to lighten the wagon's load. Eren wakes up and finds that they are back in town behind Wall Sina. The townspeople not only berate the Scout Regiment's ineptitude but are enraged over the casualties. As a result of the failed expedition, Erwin and his subordinates are summoned to the capital, where Eren is ordered to be handed over.
23	23	"Smile: Assault on Stohess, Part 1"; Transliteration: "Hohoemi -Sutohesu-ku Kyūshū (1)-" (Japanese: 微笑み ―ストヘス区急襲①―)	Hirokazu Yamada	Hiroshi Seko	September 15, 2013	October 18, 2014
In the Stohess District, the Military Police Regiment are ordered to escort the Scout Regiment convoy once they enter the capital. Annie's colleagues Hitch Dreyse and Marlo Sand are in the Military Police for opposite reasons, one for its corruption, the other for its reformation. After the convoy has entered, Armin secretly calls Annie away and begs for her help in smuggling Eren out of the capital so the Scout Regiment has time to gather proof to keep him. The one riding in the convoy is Jean in disguise. Annie agrees and Armin brings her, Eren, and Mikasa to a tunnel. Annie refuses to enter and realizes that she has walked into a trap, surrounded by Scouts. Armin finally reveals his suspicion that Annie is the Female Titan; she used Marco's omni-directional mobility gear to kill Sawney and Beane and did not kill him during the 57th Expedition. They beg Annie to prove them wrong, but instead she laughs and transforms by wounding her hand with the spike in her ring.
24	24	"Mercy: Assault on Stohess, Part 2"; Transliteration: "Jihi -Sutohesu-ku Kyūshū (2)-" (Japanese: 慈悲 ―ストヘス区急襲②―)	Akitoshi Yokoyama, Hiroyuki Tanaka	Yasuko Kobayashi	September 22, 2013	October 25, 2014
A few days earlier, Eren was informed by Erwin that Annie was suspected to be the Female Titan, thanks to Armin's deductions, and how they plan to capture her. In the present, Eren tries to transform but is unable to as his feelings for Annie are holding him back—he is unable to accept that someone he trusted turned out to be the Titan. He is then heavily injured from a tunnel collapse. Commander Nile Dawk of the Military Police Regiment demands an explanation from Erwin, holding him at gunpoint and threatening him of treason. As the Scouts try to capture Annie, Armin tells Eren that those who cannot sacrifice anything can never change anything; Mikasa reminds him that they live in a cruel world and must fight. Eren remembers his squad's deaths and his mother's, and uses his intense hatred of the Titans to finally transform.
25	25	"Wall: Assault on Stohess, Part 3"; Transliteration: "Kabe -Sutohesu-ku Kyūshū (3)-" (Japanese: 壁 ―ストヘス区急襲③―)	Daisuke Tokudo, Masashi Koizuka, Shintarō Itoga, Tetsurō Araki	Yasuko Kobayashi	September 29, 2013	November 1, 2014
A group of worshippers who idolise the Walls are ironically crushed by Annie, leaving Minister Nick the only survivor. Eren and Annie fight in their Titan forms throughout the Stohess District, causing destruction and civilian deaths. As this was Erwin's operation, he accepts responsibility for the damage and is arrested by Nile. Annie is overpowered and attempts to escape by climbing up Wall Sina, but Mikasa cuts off her fingers. Eren prepares to eat the human Annie but Levi stops him as she must be captured alive for interrogation. Annie's body encases itself in crystal, leaving her comatose and safe from interrogation. Erwin attends a government inquiry to clear his name, explaining that despite the deaths, he believes the operation was a step forward for humanity; they now plan to hunt down more intelligent Titans and launch a counterattack. Eren remains with the Scouts, who have Annie's custody as well. In the epilogue, a piece of Wall Sina crumbles, revealing the face of a Titan buried inside.

== Recap special ==
No. overall	No. in season	Title	Directed by	Original release date
13.5	13.5	"Since That Day"; Transliteration: "Ano Hi Kara" (Japanese: あの日から)	Hiroyuki Tanaka	July 7, 2013
A recap special that summarizes the events of the first thirteen episodes.

== Music ==
The soundtrack for season 1 was composed by Hiroyuki Sawano, and the first CD was released on June 28, 2013, by Pony Canyon. It contains 16 tracks, including 6 vocal tracks performed by Mika Kobayashi, mpi, Cyua, Aimee Blackschleger, and CASG (Caramel Apple Sound Gadget). A second CD containing the other half of the soundtrack was released on October 16, 2013, as a bonus offered with the fourth Blu-ray and DVD limited edition volumes of the anime.

== Home media release ==
=== Japanese ===
Pony Canyon (Japan – Region 2/A)
Vol.	Episodes	Release date	Ref.
1	1–2	July 17, 2013	
2	3–4	August 21, 2013	
3	5–7	September 18, 2013	
4	8–10	October 16, 2013	
5	11–13	November 20, 2013	
6	14–16	December 18, 2013	
7	17–19	January 15, 2014	
8	20–22	February 19, 2014	
9	23–25	March 19, 2014	

=== English ===
Funimation (North America – Region 1/A)
Part	Episodes	Release date	Ref.
1	1–13	June 3, 2014	
2	14–25	September 23, 2014	
Complete	1–25	January 24, 2017	

Manga Entertainment (British Isles – Region 2/B)
Part	Episodes	Release date	DVD Ref.	Blu-ray Ref.
1	1–13	September 15, 2014		
2	14–25	October 27, 2014		
Complete	1–25	June 27, 2016		

Madman Entertainment (Australasia – Region 4/B)
Col.	Episodes	Release date	DVD Ref.	Blu-ray Ref.
1	1–13	June 18, 2014		
2	14–25	October 15, 2014		
Complete	1–25	April 5, 2017		
