= Hiroyuki Sawano =

Japanese composer (born 1980)

- 澤野 弘之
- Born: September 12, 1980 (age 46); Tokyo, Japan
- Other name: SawanoHiroyuki[nZk]
- Occupations: Composer; arranger; lyricist; pianist; music producer
- Years active: 2004–present
- Agents: Legendoor (2006–2017); VV-ALKLINE (2017–present)
- Musical career
- Genre: Rock
- Instruments: Piano; electronic keyboard; vocoder
- Label: Sacra Music
- Member of: NAQT VANE
- Website: www.sawanohiroyuki.com

Hiroyuki Sawano (澤野 弘之, Sawano Hiroyuki; born September 12, 1980 Tokyo, Japan), stylized as Hiroyuki SAWANO, is a Japanese composer, arranger, lyricist, pianist, and music producer best known for his work on many anime series, video games, television dramas, and films. His works include the musical scores for Attack on Titan, Soul Link, Gigantic Formula, Zombie-Loan, Yoake Mae yori Ruriiro na, The Seven Deadly Sins, Sengoku Basara, Mobile Suit Gundam Unicorn, Mobile Suit Gundam Narrative, Mobile Suit Gundam Hathaway, Blue Exorcist, Aldnoah.Zero, Seraph of the End, Guilty Crown, Kill la Kill, Xenoblade Chronicles X, Re:Creators, Kabaneri of the Iron Fortress, Fanfare of Adolescence, 86 and Solo Leveling. In Live Action Drama series, his work includes Ns' Blue, Iryu Team Medical Dragon, Prisoners, My Girl, Bombee Men Maou, In addition to his role on the soundtrack, Sawano also composes many opening and ending theme songs. Overall, he has already provided the music for over 100 visual media works.

Sawano was nominated for the Newtype Anime Awards 11 times, winning four of the nominations. He has also won the Tokyo Anime Award three times, as well as two prizes at the Anime Trending Awards. Sawano has two additional music projects. In 2014, he started a vocal project under the name "SawanoHiroyuki[nZk]", with a focus on collaborating with other artists. In 2022, he formed a new group called "NAQT VANE" with Japanese singer Harukaze and design group Classic 6, focusing on creating music for overseas audiences.

== Biography ==
=== 1980–2004: Early life ===
Sawano was born in Tokyo, Japan. He started playing piano in elementary school. By this time, he was influenced by the Japanese singer-songwriter Aska, from the duo Chage and Aska, whose songs led him to vaguely dream about working in music. In junior high school, he joined a band and began learning keyboard to take charge of it in the group.

From the age of 17, Sawano studied composition, arrangement, and orchestration under the music teacher Nobuchika Tsuboi. When he was in his final years of high school, he had a desire to work on soundtrack music, so he went to a vocational school focused in composition. In this same school, he made his first public music performance. Around this period, he used to listen to the soundtrack of Studio Ghibli's movies, which led him to be influenced by the film score composer Joe Hisaishi.

=== 2004–present: Career ===
Sawano's musician career started in 2004, with him initially writing songs for other artists. He was in charge of his first soundtrack works in 2006.

From 2006 to 2009, he composed music for several anime adaptations of manga, visual novels, and video game series including Iryu Team Medical Dragon, Soul Link, Yoake Mae yori Ruriino Na Crescent Love, and Sengoku Basara. During this time, he would also publish his first original album, Musica, in 2009.

In 2010, he was involved with his first major series, Mobile Suit Gundam Unicorn, which he mentioned having worked on with the hope that this series would trigger an offer for many further projects.

In 2011, with his involvement in two popular anime series—Blue Exorcist and Guilty Crown—, he became more notable in the industry. While composing for these series he built working relationships with vocalists Mika Kobayashi and Aimee Blackschleger, who would continue to collaborate with him on future works.

In 2013, he gained wider fame with his role as the composer for the anime adaptation of Hajime Isayama's manga series Attack on Titan. For his work on the series, he won that years Newtype Anime Awards in the Soundtrack category.

In 2014, he launched a vocal song project under the name "SawanoHiroyuki[nZk]", producing the first album UnChild with Aimer as the vocalist under the name SawanoHiroyuki[nZk]:Aimer. Since then his songs under this vocal song project have also been used as the opening and ending themes for various anime, including Aldnoah.Zero, Seraph of the End, Mobile Suit Gundam Unicorn RE:0096, Re:Creators, and Legend of the Galactic Heroes: Die Neue These. The project was moved to the Sacra Music record label under Sony Music Entertainment Japan in April 2017.

On July 2, 2017, Sawano's contract with Legendoor was terminated after approximately 12 years. He is now represented by VV-ALKLINE.

In 2020, Sawano started a soundtrack revival project called "Project【emU】", arranging suites for the soundtracks of anime series he has been involved with. The suites are recorded and filmed in a studio, with guest musicians and vocalists; he has so far released suits for Attack on Titan, Guilty Crown, The Seven Deadly Sins, and Mobile Suit Gundam Unicorn.

In February 2021, he ran a "Project【emU】" concert event, "Sawano Hiroyuki LIVE【emU】2021", at the Tachikawa Stage Garden and streamed to overseas audiences, where he performed many of the main tracks from anime scores he worked on.

On March 13, 2022, he held the "Hiroyuki Sawano LIVE [nZk]007" concert, at Tokyo International Forum. The event featured guest vocalists Akihito Okano, Jean-Ken Johnny, ReoNa, mizuki, mpi, Benjamin, Laco, and SennaRin. Later, on April 23, the event was streamed to overseas audiences.

In April 2022, he produced the debut extended play of the singer SennaRin. The EP, Dignified, was released on April 13, followed by an announcement that he would continue as a producer for her works.

In September 2022, he announced his new musical group NAQT VANE, for which he acted as total producer and collaborated with singer Harukaze and Classic 6 as design director. The debut single, "Break Free", was released on September 16, 2022.

== Musical style and influences ==
Sawano has cited Ryūichi Sakamoto, Joe Hisaishi, Yoko Kanno, Hans Zimmer, and Danny Elfman as major inspirations.

His pieces tend to have exceedingly strange titles, featuring numbers, symbols, and letters from various different alphabets. He stated that he decided this because he wants "people to be able to listen to the songs in their own way and have their own reaction. I don't ever want to fix the image of what's happening on-screen too much within the track title".

Most of Sawano's vocal songs feature lyrics in English, while he also makes use of German and Japanese lyrics. He often uses choruses and breaks in his pieces, aiming to expand the song and make it more intense.

When composing for series, Sawano stated that he usually writes the music before any video materials or animation is available.

== Discography ==
=== As Hiroyuki Sawano ===
==== Original albums ====
Title	Album details	Peak positions
Title	Album details	JPN
Musica	Released: July 7, 2009 (JPN); Label: Universal Sigma; Formats: CD, digital download	—
Scene	Released: December 22, 2021 (JPN); Label: Sacra Music; Formats: CD, CD + Blu-ray, digital download	36
"—" denotes releases that did not chart or were ineligible to chart.

==== Compilation albums ====
Title	Album details	Peak positions
Title	Album details	JPN
Best of Vocal Works [nZk]	Released: February 4, 2015 (JPN); Label: DefSTAR; Format: CD	6
Best of Soundtrack [emU]	Released: September 9, 2015 (JPN); Label: SME; Format: CD	13
Best of Vocal Works (nZk) 2	Released: April 8, 2020 (JPN); Label: Sacra Music; Format: CD	6
Pianouta / Project [emU]	Released: October 1, 2025 (JPN); Label: Sacra Music; Format: CD	39

==== Singles ====
Title	Single details	Peak positions	Notes	Album
Title	Single details	JPN	Notes	Album
"Yamanaiame"	Released: November 28, 2014; Label: Pony Canyon; Formats: CD, digital download	55	"Yamanaiame" was used as the ending theme song in the first Attack on Titan compilation film, Attack on Titan Part 1: Crimson Bow and Arrow.	Attack on Titan Season 2 Original Soundtrack
"theDOGS"	Released: July 1, 2015; Label: Pony Canyon; Formats: CD, digital download	55	"theDOGS" was used as the ending theme song in the second Attack on Titan compilation film, Attack on Titan Part 2: Wings of Freedom.	Attack on Titan Season 2 Original Soundtrack
"βiοç <MK+nZk Version> / Ω"	Released: April 27, 2015; Label: Aniplex; Format: 7" vinyl	—	"βiοç <MK+nZk Version>" and "Ω" are arrangements from the tracks "βίος" and "Ω" of the soundtrack of the anime Guilty Crown.	Guilty Crown Complete Soundtrack
"KABANERIOFTHEIRONFORTRESS / Warcry"	Released: October 8, 2016; Label: Aniplex; Formats: 7" vinyl	—	"KABANERIOFTHEIRONFORTRESS" and "Warcry" were used as tracks in the soundtrack of the anime Kabaneri of the Iron Fortress.	Kabaneri of the Iron Fortress: Original Soundtrack
"Never Stop"	Released: November 14, 2021; Label: Kay Production Records; Formats: Digital download	—	"Never Stop" was used as the 4th anniversary theme song in the mobile game Knives Out.	Non-album single
"—" denotes releases that did not chart or were ineligible to chart.

==== Other involvements ====
Year	Title	Artist	Role(s)	Album	Ref(s)
2004	"Feel the moon"	Chen Min	Composer	MOON	
2004	"FALL IN LOVE"	Lena Park	Composer	COSMORAMA	
2005	"Kaze no DIVA" (風のDIVA)	Chen Min	Composer; strings arranger	Koigoromo	
2006	"Chef" (シェフ)	Shintaro Kudo	Arranger	Let's Love!	
2006	"Chiisana Ginga" (小さな銀河)	Kanako Sakai	Composer; arranger	Non-album single	
2006	"Tsuki no Yoru" (月の夜)	Liu Yifei	Composer; arranger	All My Words	
2006	"Prelude -we are not alone-"	Fumi Oto	Composer; arranger; pianist	Non-album singles	
2006	"Ima wo Dakishimete" (今を抱きしめて)	Hitomi Nabatame	Composer; arranger	Non-album singles	
2007	"grief ~crossing sadness~" (grief 〜跨越悲傷〜)	Chen Min	Composer; arranger	Pray -two as one-	
2007	"THIS WAY B.O.R. ver."	DEPAPEPE	Arranger	BEGINNING OF THE ROAD 〜collection of early songs〜	
2007	"Squall"	Shintaro Kudo	Arranger	Let's Love!	
2007	"Kuhaku no Tsuki" (空白の月)	Shintaro Kudo	Arranger	Let's Love!	
2007	"Nagare no Naka de" (流れの中で)	Rip Slyme	Pianist	FUNFAIR	
2008	"That's The Way It Is"	melody.	Strings arranger	Non-album single	
2008	"To You"	Skoop On Somebody	Arranger	STAY or SHINE	
2008	"Umikara Hajimaru Monogatari" (海から始まる物語)	Minami Kuribayashi	Arranger	Dream Link	
2008	"PRAY"	indigo blue	Arranger	indigo blue 3 ～magic carpet～	
2008	"Itoshisetsuna Namida" (イトシセツナナミダ)	Peaky SALT	Arranger	Non-album single	
2010	"SAKURA Road"	indigo blue	Arranger	SHORELY	
2011	"Bolero ~Passion on Ice~	Tomotaka Okamoto	Arranger	Kimi no Tame ni Utaou	
2013	"Neo Fantasia"	Minori Chihara	Composer; arranger	Neo Fantasia	
2013	"RE:I AM"	Aimer	Composer; lyricist; arranger; producer; programming; pianist	Midnight Sun	
2014	"StarRingChild"	Aimer	Composer; lyricist; arranger; producer; pianist; keyboards & other instruments	Midnight Sun	
2016	"ninelie"	Aimer with chelly (EGOIST)	Composer; lyricist; arranger; producer; pianist; keyboards & other instruments	Daydream	
2017	"Ah Yeah!! (produced by Hiroyuki Sawano)"	SukimaSwitch	Arranger; producer	re:Action	
2017	"Alive"	Do As Infinity	Composer; arranger; producer; pianist; keyboards & other instruments	Alive	
2017	"Iron Hornet"	Do As Infinity	Composer; arranger; producer; pianist; keyboards & other instruments	Alive	
2017	"Keshin no Juu" (化身の獣)	Do As Infinity	Composer; arranger; producer; pianist; keyboards & other instruments	Alive	
2017	"Silver Moon"	Do As Infinity	Composer; arranger; producer; pianist; keyboards & other instruments	Alive	
2017	"To Know You"	Do As Infinity	Composer; arranger; producer; pianist; keyboards & other instruments	Alive	
2017	"Yuiitsu no Shinjitsu" (唯一の真実)	Do As Infinity	Composer; arranger; producer; pianist; keyboards & other instruments	Alive	
2018	"-prologue-"	Do As Infinity	Composer; arranger; producer; pianist; keyboards & other instruments	Alive	
2018	"-epilogue-"	Do As Infinity	Composer; arranger; producer; pianist; keyboards & other instruments	Alive	
2018	"Get Over It"	Do As Infinity	Composer; arranger; producer; pianist; keyboards & other instruments	Alive	
2018	"Hi no Tori" (火の鳥)	Do As Infinity	Composer; arranger; producer; pianist; keyboards & other instruments	Alive	
2018	"His/Story"	Takanori Nishikawa	Composer; arranger; producer; pianist; keyboards & other instruments	SINGularity	
2018	"Roll The Dice"	Takanori Nishikawa	Composer; arranger; producer; pianist; keyboards & other instruments	SINGularity	
2019	"SINGularity"	Takanori Nishikawa	Composer; arranger; producer; pianist; keyboards & other instruments	SINGularity	
2019	"i-mage <in/AR>"	Aimer	Composer; lyricist; arranger; producer; pianist; keyboards & other instruments	Penny Rain	
2019	"Crescent Cutlass"	Takanori Nishikawa	Composer; arranger; producer; pianist; keyboards & other instruments	SINGularity II -Kakeisei no protoCOL-	
2019	"Claymore"	Takanori Nishikawa	Composer; arranger; producer; pianist; keyboards & other instruments	SINGularity II -Kakeisei no protoCOL-	
2019	"CALL & PRAY"	Hey! Say! JUMP	Composer; lyricist; arranger	PARADE	
2019	"Unti-L <100S-R2>	ASCA with mizuki	Composer; lyricist; arranger	Hyakka Ryouran	
2020	"3 A.M."	Survive Said The Prophet	Arranger	Inside Your Head	
2020	"Koko" (ココ)	Taiiku Okazaki feat. Beverly	Arranger	Pokémon the Movie: Koko Theme Song Collection	
2021	"Hikari Are" (光あれ)	Akihito Okano	Composer; arranger	Walkin' with a song	
2021	"Sono Saki no Hikari e" (その先の光へ)	Akihito Okano	Composer; arranger	Walkin' with a song	
2021	"Judgement"	Takanori Nishikawa	Composer; arranger	SINGularity II -Kakeisei no protoCOL-	
2021	"kIng"	Emiko Suzuki	Composer; lyricist; arranger; producer; pianist	5 Senses	
2022	"dust"	SennaRin	Composer; arranger; producer; piano; keyboards & other instruments	Dignified EP	
2022	"BEEP"	SennaRin	Composer; arranger; producer; piano; keyboards & other instruments	Dignified EP	
2022	"Limit-tension"	SennaRin	Composer; arranger; producer; piano; keyboards & other instruments	Dignified EP	
2022	"Akashi" (証)	SennaRin	Composer; arranger; producer; piano; keyboards & other instruments	Dignified EP	
2022	"Dignified-IN"	SennaRin	Composer; arranger; producer; piano; keyboards & other instruments	Dignified EP	
2022	"Dignified-OUT"	SennaRin	Composer; arranger; producer; piano; keyboards & other instruments	Dignified EP	
2022	"melt"	SennaRin	Composer; lyricist; arranger; producer; piano; keyboards & other instruments	Dignified EP	
2022	"pARTs"	Natumi.	Composer; arranger; producer; piano; keyboards & other instruments	TBA	
2022	"Activation"	Natumi.	Composer; arranger; producer; piano; keyboards & other instruments	TBA	
2022	"Shikisai" (色彩)	Riria.	Composer; arranger; producer; piano; keyboards & other instruments	BUBBLE Original Motion Picture Soundtrack	
2022	"Tot Musica"	Ado	Composer; arranger; producer; piano; keyboards & other instruments; background vocals	Uta no Uta: One Piece Film: Red	
2022	"Saihate" (最果て)	SennaRin	Composer; arranger; producer; keyboards & other instruments	TBA	
2022	"Toumeina Wakusei" (透明な惑星)	SennaRin	Composer; arranger; producer; keyboards & other instruments	TBA	
2023	"SACRA"	ReoNa	Composer; arranger; producer; keyboards & other instruments	HUMAN	
2023	"Silhouette"	Anonymouz	Composer; arranger; producer; keyboards & other instruments	11:11	
2024	"pray"	Eve	Composer; producer	Innai Keisatsu	

=== As SawanoHiroyuki[nZk] ===
==== Albums ====
Title	Album details	Performer(s)	Peak positions	
Title	Album details	Performer(s)	JPN	KOR
O1	Released: September 9, 2015 (JPN); Label: SME Records; Formats: CD, CD + DVD, digital download	SawanoHiroyuki[nZk]: Aimer; mizuki; mica; Gemie; Yosh	7	1
2V-ALK	Released: September 20, 2017 (JPN); Label: Sacra Music; Formats: CD, CD + Blu-ray, digital download	SawanoHiroyuki[nZk]: Aimer; Eliana; Gemie; mizuki; naNami; Tielle; Yosh	3	—
Remember	Released: March 6, 2019 (JPN); Label: Sacra Music; Formats: CD, CD + Blu-ray, digital download	SawanoHiroyuki[nZk]: Aimer; Akihito Okano; ASCA; Gemie; LiSA; mizuki; naNami; Sayuri; Sugizo; Sukima Switch; Takanori Nishikawa; Tielle; Uru; Yosh	6	—
IV	Released: March 3, 2021 (JPN); Label: Sacra Music; Formats: CD, CD + Blu-ray, digital download	SawanoHiroyuki[nZk]: Aina the End; Anly; Gemie; Jean-Ken Johnny; Laco; mizuki; naNami; okazakitaiiku; ReoNa; Tielle; Yosh; Yuuri	9	—
V	Released: January 18, 2023 (JPN); Label: Sacra Music; Formats: CD, CD + Blu-ray, digital download	SawanoHiroyuki[nZk]: Aska; Hata Motohiro; Honoka Takahashi; Junki Kono; Laco; mizuki; ReN; Sho Yonashiro; suis; XAI	9	—

==== Collaboration albums ====
Title	Album details	Performer(s)	Peak positions
Title	Album details	Performer(s)	JPN
UnChild	Released: June 25, 2014 (JPN); Label: Defstar Records; Formats: CD, digital download	SawanoHiroyuki[nZk]:Aimer	10

==== Singles ====
Title	Single details	Performer(s)	Peak positions	Notes	Album
Title	Single details	Performer(s)	JPN	Notes	Album
"A/Z ǀ aLIEz"	Released: September 10, 2014 (JPN); Label: Defstar Records; Formats: CD, CD + DVD, digital download	SawanoHiroyuki[nZk]:mizuki	9	"A/Z" was used as the first ending theme song, "aLIEz" was used as the second ending theme song in the anime Aldnoah.Zero.	o1
"&Z"	Released: February 4, 2015 (JPN); Label: DefSTAR Records; Formats: CD, CD + DVD, digital download	SawanoHiroyuki[nZk]:mizuki	12	Used as the second opening theme song in the anime Aldnoah.Zero.	o1
"X.U. ǀ scaPEGoat"	Released: May 20, 2015 (JPN); Label: DefSTAR Records; Formats: CD, CD + DVD, digital download	SawanoHiroyuki[nZk]: mica; Gemie; Yosh	10	"X.U." was used as the first opening theme song, "scaPEGoat" was used as the first ending theme song in the anime Seraph of the End.	o1
"Into the Sky EP"	Released: June 29, 2016 (JPN); Label: SME Records; Formats: CD, CD + DVD, digital download	SawanoHiroyuki[nZk]: Aimer; mica; naNami; Tielle	6	"Into the Sky" was used as the first opening song, "Next 2 U -eUC-" was used as the first ending song, "bL∞dy f8 -eUC-" was used as the second ending song in the television rebroadcast of the Mobile Suit Gundam Unicorn original video anime adaptation, Mobile Suit Gundam Unicorn RE:0096.	2V-ALK
"CRYst-Alise"	Released: July 8, 2016 (JPN); Label: SME Records; Format: Digital download	SawanoHiroyuki[nZk]: Tielle; Yosh	—	"CRYst-Alise" was used as the main theme song, "Rise Above" as the battle theme in the mobile game VALHAITRISING.	2V-ALK
"e of s"	Released: December 30, 2016 (JPN); Label: SME Records; Format: Digital download	SawanoHiroyuki[nZk]: Aimer; mizuki	—	"e of s" was used as the opening theme song in the mobile game Soul Reverse Zero.; "ninelie <cry-v>" was used as the ending theme in the first Kabaneri of the Iron Fortress compilation film.	2V-ALK
"gravityWall / shØut"	Released: June 28, 2017 (JPN); Label: Sacra Music; Formats: CD, CD + DVD, digital download	SawanoHiroyuki[nZk]: Gemie; mizuki; Tielle	11	"gravityWall" was used as the first opening theme song, "shØut" as the second opening theme song in the anime Re:Creators.	2V-ALK
"Binary Star / Cage"	Released: April 25, 2018 (JPN); Label: Sacra Music; Formats: CD, CD + DVD, digital download	SawanoHiroyuki[nZk]: Gemie; Tielle; Uru	17	"Binary Star" was used as the opening theme song in the 2018 anime adaptation of Legend of the Galactic Heroes, titled Legend of the Galactic Heroes Die Neue These.; "Cage" was used as the theme song for the life-sized Unicorn Gundam statue from Mobile Suit Gundam Unicorn.	R∃/MEMBER
"narrative / NOISEofRAIN"	Released: November 28, 2018 (JPN); Label: Sacra Music; Formats: CD, CD + DVD, digital download	SawanoHiroyuki[nZk]: LiSA; mizuki; Takanori Nishikawa; Tielle	10	"narrative" was used as the theme song in the anime film Mobile Suit Gundam Narrative. "Cage <NTv>" was also used as an insert song in the same film.	R∃/MEMBER
"Tranquility / Trollz"	Released: October 2, 2019 (JPN); Label: Sacra Music; Formats: CD, CD + DVD, digital download	SawanoHiroyuki[nZk]: Anly; Gemie; Laco; Tielle; Uru	24	"Tranquility" was used as the ending theme song in the anime film series Legend of the Galactic Heroes: Die Neue These Seiran.	iv
"Chaos Drifters / CRY"	Released: July 29, 2020 (JPN); Label: Sacra Music; Formats: CD, CD + DVD, digital download	SawanoHiroyuki[nZk]: Gemie; Jean-Ken Johnny; mizuki; Tielle	17	"Chaos Drifters" was used as the second opening theme song in the anime No Guns Life.; "CRY" was used as the opening theme song in the anime film series Legend of the Galactic Heroes: Die Neue These NHK.	iv
"Avid / Hands Up to the Sky"	Released: June 6, 2021 (JPN); Label: Sacra Music; Formats: CD, CD + DVD, digital download	SawanoHiroyuki[nZk]: Anly; Laco; mizuki; Tielle	19	"Avid" and "Hands Up to the Sky" were used as the ending theme songs in the anime 86.	V
"LilaS"	Released: March 20, 2022 (JPN); Label: Sacra Music; Formats: Digital download	SawanoHiroyuki[nZk]:Honoka Takahashi	—	"LilaS" was used as the ending theme song in the last episode of the anime 86.	V
"OUTSIDERS"	Released: May 25, 2022 (JPN); Label: Sacra Music; Formats: CD, CD + DVD, digital download	SawanoHiroyuki[nZk]: Junki Kono; Laco; naNami; Sho Yonashiro	25	"OUTSIDERS" was used as the ending theme song in the anime Fanfare of Adolescence.	V
"Lemonade"	Released: December 21, 2022; Label: Sacra Music; Formats: Digital download	SawanoHiroyuki[nZk]:XAI	—	"Lemonade" was used as the theme song in the anime The Seven Deadly Sins: Grudge of Edinburgh Part 1.	V
"FAKEit"	Released: January 1, 2023; Label: Sacra Music; Formats: Digital download	SawanoHiroyuki[nZk]:Laco	—	"FAKEit" was used as the theme song in the anime Fate/strange Fake: Whispers of Dawn.	V
"odd:i"	Released: August 8, 2023; Label: Sacra Music; Formats: Digital download	SawanoHiroyuki[nZk]:Akihito Okano (Pornograffiti)	—	"odd:I" was used as the theme song in the anime The Seven Deadly Sins: Grudge of Edinburgh Part 2.	TBA
"LEveL"	Released: January 24, 2024; Label: Sacra Music; Formats: CD, CD + Blu-ray, digital download	SawanoHiroyuki[nZk]: TOMORROW X TOGETHER; XAI	24	"LEveL" was used as the opening theme song in the anime Solo Leveling.	TBA
"INERTIA"	Released: April 6, 2025; Label: Sacra Music; Formats: Digital download	SawanoHiroyuki[nZk]:Rei	—	"INERTIA" was used as the opening theme song in the anime To Be Hero X.	TBA
"—" denotes releases that did not chart or were ineligible to chart.

== Videography ==
=== Music videos ===
Year	Title	Director(s)	Producer(s)	Ref(s)
2014	"A/Z"	TAKCOM	OKNACK	
2014	"&Z"	Ryohei Shingu	19-juke-	
2015	"X.U. (short ver.)"	maxilla		
2015	"scaPEGoat"	maxilla		
2015	"s-AVE"	Tatsunori Sato	19-juke-	
2016	"Into the Sky"	Yuji Hariu (P.I.C.S)	Naoki Akiyama (19-juke-)	
2016	"e of s (game edit)"	Takashi Chiba	Satoshi Tsukamoto (biogon pictures inc.)	
2017	"gravityWall"	Shin Okawa	Naoki Akiyama (19-juke-)	
2017	"sh0ut"	Shin Okawa	Naoki Akiyama (19-juke-)	
2017	"Christmast Scene"	Taichi Nishimaki	Shigeki Azuma	
2018	"Binary Star"	—N/a	—N/a	
2018	"narrative"	Yasuhiro Arafune	Naoki Akiyama; Kouhei Miyazato	
2019	"Tranquility"	OSRIN	Hiroaki Watanabe (Parade Tokyo)	
2019	"Trollz"	OSRIN	Hiroaki Watanabe (Parade Tokyo)	
2019	"BELONG"	Takuto Shimpo	SEP	
2020	"Chaos Drifters"	Atsunori Toshi (A4A)	SEP	
2020	"CRY"	Atsunori Toshi (A4A)	SEP	
2021	"time"	Atsushi Tani	SEP	
2021	"Abura"	Atsushi Tani	SEP	
2021	"N0VA"	Taichi Nishimaki	Hiroyuki Sawano	
2021	"Möbius"	Taichi Nishimaki		
2021	"Avid"	Raita Kuramoto	SEP	
2021	"THE ANSWER"	Taichi Nishimaki		
2021	"8SIX <vcpf-ver.>"	Taichi Nishimaki		
2021	"TRACER"	Taichi Nishimaki		
2022	"Call your name (scene ver.)"	PEXELS		
2022	"OUTSIDERS"	Takuya Oyama	Motoki Yamaguchi	
2023	"Chikyutoiunanomiyako"	—N/a	—N/a	
2023	"FAKEit"	—N/a	—N/a	
2023	"odd:I"	—N/a	—N/a	
2024	"LEveL"	—N/a	—N/a	
2024	"DARK ARIA ＜LV2＞"	—N/a	—N/a	

== Works ==
=== Anime ===
Year	Title	Role(s)	Ref(s)
2006	Soul Link	Composer	
2006	Yoake Mae yori Ruriiro na: Crescent Love	Composer; Opening theme song composer and arranger	
2006	Project Blue Earth SOS	Promotional video music creator	
2007	Kishin Taisen Gigantic Formula	Composer	
2007	Zombie-Loan	Composer	
2009	Sengoku Basara: Samurai Kings	Composer	
2010	Mobile Suit Gundam Unicorn	Composer; 6th and 7th theme song composer, arranger and lyricist	
2010	Sengoku Basara: Samurai Kings II	Composer	
2011	Blue Exorcist	Composer	
2011	Sengoku Basara: Samurai Kings – The Last Party	Composer	
2011	Guilty Crown	Composer	
2012	Guilty Crown: Lost Christmas – An Episode of Port Town	Composer	
2012	Blue Exorcist: The Movie	Composer	
2013	Attack on Titan	Composer	
2013	Kill la Kill	Composer	
2013	Attack on Titan OVA	Composer	
2014	Aldnoah.Zero	Composer; Ending theme song producer, composer, arranger and lyricist	
2014	The Seven Deadly Sins	Composer (other tracks by Takafumi Wada)	
2014	Attack on Titan Movie Part 1: Crimson Bow and Arrow	Composer; Ending theme song producer, composer and arranger	
2014	Attack on Titan: No Regrets	Composer	
2015	Aldnoah.Zero Part 2	Composer; Opening theme producer, composer, arranger and lyricist	
2015	Seraph of the End	Composer; Opening and ending theme song producer, composer and arranger; Music producer; (other tracks by Takafumi Wada, Asami Tachibana & Megumi Shiraishi)	
2015	The Seven Deadly Sins OVA	Composer	
2015	Attack on Titan Movie Part 2: Wings of Freedom	Composer; Ending theme song producer, composer and arranger	
2015	Seraph of the End: Battle in Nagoya	Composer; Music producer; (other tracks by Takafumi Wada, Asami Tachibana & Megumi Shiraishi)	
2016	Mobile Suit Gundam Unicorn RE:0096	Composer; Opening and ending theme song producer, composer, arranger and lyricist	
2016	Kabaneri of the Iron Fortress	Composer; Ending theme song producer, composer, lyricist & arranger	
2016	The Seven Deadly Sins: Signs of Holy War	Composer (other tracks by Takafumi Wada)	
2017	Blue Exorcist: Kyoto Saga	Composer (other tracks by Kohta Yamamoto)	
2017	Attack on Titan Season 2	Composer	
2017	Re:Creators	Composer; Opening theme song producer, composer, lyricist & arranger	
2017	Juni Taisen: Zodiac War	Ending theme song composer, arranger and producer	
2017	Attack on Titan: Lost Girls	Composer; Ending theme song producer, composer and arranger	
2018	Attack on Titan: The Roar of Awakening	Composer; Ending theme song producer, composer and arranger	
2018	The Seven Deadly Sins: Revival of The Commandments	Composer (other tracks by Takafumi Wada & Kohta Yamamoto)	
2018	The Legend of the Galactic Heroes: Die Neue These Kaikō	Opening theme song producer, composer and arranger	
2018	Attack on Titan Season 3	Composer	
2018	The Seven Deadly Sins the Movie: Prisoners of the Sky	Composer (other tracks by Takafumi Wada)	
2018	Mobile Suit Gundam Narrative	Composer; Theme song producer, composer, lyricist & arranger	
2019	Attack on Titan Season 3 Part 2	Composer	
2019	Kabaneri of the Iron Fortress: Unato Decisive Battle	Composer	
2019	Promare	Composer	
2019	Legend of the Galactic Heroes: Die Neue These Seiran	Opening and ending theme song producer, composer and arranger	
2019	The Seven Deadly Sins: Wrath of the Gods	Composer (other tracks by Kohta Yamamoto)	
2019	Fate/strange Fake	Promotional video music creator	
2020	Kingdom Season 3	Composer; Ending theme song producer, composer, lyricist & arranger; (other tracks by Kohta Yamamoto)	
2020	No Guns Life Season 2	Opening theme song producer, composer and arranger	
2020	Attack on Titan: Chronicle	Composer	
2020	Attack on Titan: The Final Season	Composer (other tracks by Kohta Yamamoto)	
2021	The Seven Deadly Sins: Dragon's Judgement	Composer; Opening and ending theme song producer, composer and arranger; (other tracks by Takafumi Wada & Kohta Yamamoto)	
2021	86	Composer; Ending theme song producer, composer and arranger; (other tracks by Kohta Yamamoto)	
2021	Mobile Suit Gundam: Hathaway's Flash	Composer	
2021	The Seven Deadly Sins: Cursed by Light	Composer; Theme song producer, composer and arranger; (other tracks by Kohta Yamamoto)	
2021	86 Part 2	Composer (other tracks by Kohta Yamamoto)	
2022	Attack on Titan: The Final Season Part 2	Composer (other tracks by Kohta Yamamoto)	
2022	Legend of the Galactic Heroes: Die Neue These Gekitotsu / Sakubō	Opening and ending theme song composer, arranger and producer	
2022	Fanfare of Adolescence	Composer; Ending theme song producer, composer and arranger	
2022	Kingdom Season 4	Composer (other tracks by Kohta Yamamoto)	
2022	Amaim Warrior at the Borderline Part 2	Ending theme song composer, arranger and producer	
2022	Bubble	Composer	
2022	One Piece Film: Red	Insert song composer, arranger and producer	
2022	Dragon Raja	Opening theme song composer, arranger and producer	
2022	Bleach: Thousand-Year Blood War	Ending theme song composer, arranger and producer	
2022	The Seven Deadly Sins: Grudge of Edinburgh	Composer; Theme song producer, composer and arranger; (other tracks by Kohta Yamamoto)	
2023	Kaina of the Great Snow Sea	Main theme composer	
2023	Attack on Titan: The Final Season Final Chapters	Composer (other tracks by Kohta Yamamoto)	
2023	Fate/strange Fake: Whispers of Dawn	Composer; Theme song producer, composer and arranger	
2023	Protocol: Rain	Opening theme song composer, arranger and producer	
2023	Four Knights of the Apocalypse	Main theme composer	
2024	Blue Exorcist: Shimane Illuminati Saga / Beyond the Snow Saga / The Blue Night Saga	Composer (other tracks by Kohta Yamamoto)	
2024	Solo Leveling	Composer; Opening theme song producer, composer, arranger and lyricist	
2024	Mechanical Arms	Composer; Opening & Ending theme song producer, composer & arranger; (other tracks by Kohta Yamamoto and Daiki)	
2025	The Rose of Versailles	Composer; Music producer; (other tracks by Kohta Yamamoto)	
2025	Solo Leveling Season 2: Arise from the Shadow	Composer; Opening theme song producer, composer & arranger	
2025	To Be Hero X	Composer; Opening & ending theme song producer, composer and arranger; (other tracks by Kohta Yamamoto, Hidefumi Kenmochi, Daiki, Shuhei Mutsuki, Hideyuki Fukasawa, Misaki Umase and Ryuichi Takada)	
2026	Fate/strange Fake	Composer; Opening theme song producer, composer and arranger	
2026	Mobile Suit Gundam Hathaway: The Sorcery of Nymph Circe	Composer	
2027	Teenage Mercenary	Composer	

=== Video games ===
Year	Title	Role(s)	Ref(s)
2014	3594ε	Composer	
2015	Xenoblade Chronicles X	Composer	
2016	Valhait Rising	Theme song composer and arranger	
2016	Soul Reverse Zero	Opening theme song composer and arranger	
2018	Border Break	Opening theme song composer and arranger	
2018	Kōtetsujō no Kabaneri -Ran- Hajimaru Michiato	Composer; Opening theme song composer and arranger; (other tracks by Kohta Yamamoto)	
2019	Iron Saga	Composer; Opening and ending theme song composer and arranger	
2019	Blue Exorcist: Damned Chord	Theme song composer and arranger	
2019	League of Legends	Theme song composer and arranger (StarGuardian Skin 2019)	
2021	Knives Out	Theme song composer and arranger	
2022	Goddess of Victory: Nikke	Theme song composer and arranger	
2023	Blue Protocol	Main theme composer	
2025	Xenoblade Chronicles X: Definitive Edition	Composer (other tracks by Misaki Umase)	

=== Television dramas ===
Year	Title	Role(s)	Ref(s)
2006	Ns' Aoi	Composer (other tracks by Yuko Fukushima)	
2006	Garo	Composer; Arranger; (other tracks by BUDDY ZOO)	
2006	Team Medical Dragon	Composer (other tracks by Shin Kono)	
2007	Tokyo Tower: Mom and Me, and Sometimes Dad	Composer (other tracks by Shin Kono and Kentarou Kobuchi)	
2007	Kodoku no Kake ~Itoshiki Hito yo~	Composer	
2007	Team Medical Dragon 2	Composer (other tracks by Toshiaki Matsumoto & Steve Vai)	
2008	Bomb Bee Men	Composer	
2008	NHK Special: Miracle Body	Composer	
2008	81diver	Composer	
2008	Maō	Composer	
2008	The Sunday NEXT	Main theme composer and arranger	
2008	Prisoner	Composer	
2009	Triangle	Composer (other tracks by Yuki Hayashi, Hiromi Uehara & Kazumasa Oda)	
2009	Sunday Sports	Opening and ending theme song composer	
2009	BOSS	Composer (other tracks by Takafumi Wada & Yuki Hayashi)	
2009	My Girl	Composer (other tracks by Takafumi Wada)	
2010	Massugu na Otoko	Composer (other tracks by Takafumi Wada)	
2010	Team Medical Dragon 3	Composer (other tracks by Shin Kono & Ai)	
2010	Marks no Yama	Composer	
2011	BOSS 2nd Season	Composer (other tracks by Takafumi Wada & Yuki Hayashi)	
2011	Marumo no Okite	Composer (other tracks by Yutaka Yamada)	
2012	Presumed Guilty	Composer (other tracks by Takafumi Wada & Kengo Tokusashi)	
2013	Someday at a Place in the Sun	Composer (other tracks by Takafumi Wada & Kengo Tokusashi)	
2013	Lady Joker	Composer (other tracks by Shuichiro Fukuhiro)	
2013	LINK	Composer (other tracks by Asami Tachibana)	
2015	Mare	Composer	
2016	Thunderbolt Fantasy	Composer	
2017	CRISIS	Composer (other tracks by Kohta Yamamoto)	
2018	Thunderbolt Fantasy Season 2	Composer; Opening and ending theme song composer and arranger; (other tracks by Takafumi Wada)	
2019	Sign: Houigakusha Yuzuki Takashi no Jiken	Composer (other tracks by Kohta Yamamoto)	
2021	Thunderbolt Fantasy Season 3	Composer; Opening theme song composer and arranger; (other tracks by Takafumi Wada & Kohta Yamamoto)	
2023	Watashi no Otto wa: Ano Musume no Koibito	Opening theme song composer and arranger	
2024	Innai Keisatsu	Opening and ending theme song composer and arranger	
2024	Thunderbolt Fantasy Season 4	Composer; Opening theme song composer and arranger; (Other tracks by Kohta Yamamoto & Takafumi Wada)	
2026	Tokyo MPD PR Unit 2	Composer (other tracks by Kohta Yamamoto)	

=== Movies ===
Year	Title	Role(s)	Ref(s)
2006	Catch a Wave	Arranger; Composer for one track in collaboration with DEPAPEPE; (arranged in collaboration with DEPAPEPE and Taichi Nakamura)	
2006	A Song to the Sun	Composer	
2007	Happily Ever After	Composer	
2008	Flowers in the Shadows	Composer	
2010	Higanjima: Escape from Vampire Island	Composer	
2010	Box!	Composer	
2012	Platina Data	Composer	
2019	Thunderbolt Fantasy: Seiyuu Genka	Composer; Theme song composer, arranger and producer	

== Awards and nominations ==
Year	Award	Category	Work/nominee	Result	Ref(s)
2006	Television Drama Academy Awards	Music Award	Team Medical Dragon	Won	
2006	Television Drama Academy Awards	Music Award	A Song to the Sun	Won	
2013	Newtype Anime Awards	Soundtrack	Attack on Titan	Won	
2014	Tokyo Anime Award	Best Music	Hiroyuki Sawano	Won	
2014	Newtype Anime Awards	Soundtrack	Kill la Kill	Won	
2014	Newtype Anime Awards	Soundtrack	Aldnoah.Zero	6th place	
2015	Tokyo Anime Award	Best Music	Hiroyuki Sawano	Won	
2015	JASRAC Awards	Domestic Works	Attack on Titan Background Music	Silver Award	
2015	Annual Game Music Awards	Outstanding Artist – Newcomer	Xenoblade Chronicles X	Won	
2015	Japan Gold Disc Awards	Animation Album of the Year	Mobile Suit Gundam Unicorn Complete Best	Won	
2015	Newtype Anime Awards	Soundtrack	Aldnoah.Zero	Won	
2015	Newtype Anime Awards	Soundtrack	Attack on Titan Movie Part 1: Crimson Bow and Arrow	6th place	
2015	Newtype Anime Awards	Theme Song	"&Z"	10th place	
2016	Newtype Anime Awards	Soundtrack	Kabaneri of the Iron Fortress	Won	
2017	Tokyo Anime Award	Best Sound/Performance	Hiroyuki Sawano	Won	
2017	Newtype Anime Awards	Best Soundtrack	Attack on Titan Season 2	5th place	
2017	Newtype Anime Awards	Best Soundtrack	Re:Creators	10th place	
2018	2nd Crunchyroll Anime Awards	Best Score	Re:Creators	Nominated	
2019	Newtype Anime Awards	Best Soundtrack	Promare	3rd place	
2019	Newtype Anime Awards	Best Soundtrack	Attack on Titan Season 3	8th place	
2020	4th Crunchyroll Anime Awards	Best Score	Attack on Titan Season 3	Nominated	
2022	6th Crunchyroll Anime Awards	Best Score	86	Nominated	
2022	8th Anime Trending Awards	Best Soundtrack	86	Won	
2022	8th Anime Trending Awards	Best Soundtrack	Attack on Titan: The Final Season	3rd place	
2022	8th Anime Trending Awards	Best Ending Theme	"Avid"	Won	
2023	7th Crunchyroll Anime Awards	Best Score	Attack on Titan: The Final Season Part 2	Won	
2024	8th Crunchyroll Anime Awards	Best Score	Attack on Titan: The Final Season The Final Chapters Special 1	Won	
2025	9th Crunchyroll Anime Awards	Best Score	Solo Leveling	Won	
2025	9th Crunchyroll Anime Awards	Best Opening Sequence	"Level"	Nominated	
2025	9th Crunchyroll Anime Awards	Best Anime Song	"Level"	Nominated	
2026	10th Crunchyroll Anime Awards	Best Score	Solo Leveling: Arise from the Shadow	Nominated	
