= Attack on Titan season 2 =

Second season of the anime television series (2017)

Attack on Titan
- Season 2
- No. of episodes: 12

Release
- Original network: MBS TV
- Original release: April 1 – June 17, 2017

Season chronology
- ← Previous; Season 1 Next → Season 3

The second season of the Attack on Titan anime television series was produced by IG Port's Wit Studio, chief directed by Tetsurō Araki and directed by Masashi Koizuka, with Yasuko Kobayashi handling series composition and Kyōji Asano providing character designs. It covers the "Clash of the Titans" arc (chapters 35–51) from the original manga by Hajime Isayama. It was broadcast on MBS TV from April 1 to June 17, 2017, and later aired on Tokyo MX, FBS, TOS, HTB, TV Aichi, BS11, and other JNN stations nationwide. Funimation and Crunchyroll streamed the second season on their respective websites, while Adult Swim aired Funimation's English dubbed version.

The season follows Eren Jaeger and his friends from the 104th Training Corps who have just begun to become full members of the Survey Corps. After fighting the Female Titan, Eren finds no time to rest as a horde of Titans is approaching Wall Rose and the battle for humanity continues. As the Survey Corps races to save the wall, they uncover more about the invading Titans and the dark secrets of their own members.

The score is composed by Hiroyuki Sawano. The opening theme song is "Opfert eure Herzen!" (心臓を捧げよ, Shinzō wo Sasageyo!; lit. "Dedicate your Heart!") by Linked Horizon, and the ending theme song is "Yūgure no Tori" (夕暮れの鳥; lit. "Birds of Twilight") by Shinsei Kamattechan.

== Episodes ==
No. overall	No. in season	Title	Directed by	Written by	Storyboarded by	Original release date	English air date
26	1	"Beast Titan"; Transliteration: "Kemono no Kyojin" (Japanese: 獣の巨人)	Hiroyuki Tanaka	Yasuko Kobayashi	Masashi Koizuka	April 1, 2017	April 23, 2017
Hange Zoë and her team discover a Titan sealed inside Wall Sina. Pastor Nick of the Wall Cult urges them to cover it from sunlight with sheets. However, he refuses to tell Hange why it is there, leading her to suspect that there are more Titans hidden within the walls. Erwin Smith is informed that Wall Rose was breached by Titans. Twelve hours earlier, the rest of the 104th Cadets were stationed at an outpost, unarmed and under suspicion of being Titans, when Titans were seen advancing from the south. Miche Zacharius orders them to spread out and inform the nearby villages while he stays behind to delay them. Miche is captured by a Beast Titan, which looks apelike and is capable of speaking. The Beast Titan takes Miche's omni-directional mobility gear, curious about it, and leaves him to be eaten by the Titans.
27	2	"I'm Home"; Transliteration: "Tadaima" (Japanese: ただいま)	Yoshihide Ibata	Yasuko Kobayashi	Masashi Koizuka	April 8, 2017	April 30, 2017
Armin Arlelt and Hange deduce that the Wall Titans sealed in the walls provide its strength; they've been protected from the Titans by the Titans. The Scout Regiment departs from the Stohess District in the capital to deal with the Titans inside Wall Rose. Sasha Braus rushes to her home village of Dauper to warn them. She arrives to find the village deserted except for a woman being eaten by a malnourished Titan, and her little daughter in shock. Sasha flees with the girl and succeeds in blinding the Titan with her arrows, just as a group of villagers, including her father, come by and pick her up. Conny Springer and his group arrive at Conny's own home village, Ragako, only to find that it has already been attacked by Titans. He discovers a Titan trapped inside his house and they wonder how it was able to travel so far from the Walls since its legs seem too feeble to support its body.
28	3	"Southwestward"; Transliteration: "Nansei e" (Japanese: 南西へ)	Kenji Imura	Hiroshi Seko	Ryōtarō Makihara	April 15, 2017	May 7, 2017
Conny is bewildered when the Titan atop his house faintly speaks, welcoming him home, and prompting him to wonder if he just heard his mother. His group reunites with Nanaba's group, which includes Christa Lenz and Ymir. They realize that no breaches or holes occurred in the walls for the Titans to have come through. They decide to rest overnight at the Castle Utgard ruins. In Eren Jaeger's group, Eren learns that he can seal the breach in the Shiganshina District with the same crystallized skin Annie Leonhart had; it turns out the walls are literally made of the same material: Titan crystallized skin. Pastor Nick reveals that Christa is the key to all the answers. Sasha delivers Hange a scroll from Erwin, advising them to head to Castle Utgard. The Beast Titan leads Titans to attack Utgard, shocking the group as to why these Titans are active at night.
29	4	"Soldier"; Transliteration: "Heishi" (Japanese: 兵士)	Hitomi Ezoe	Hiroshi Seko	Satoshi Iwataki	April 22, 2017	May 14, 2017
Two hours before the attack at Castle Utgard, the 104th Cadets rest and Conny mentions that the Titan at Ragako resembled his mother. Reiner Braun becomes suspicious when Ymir is able to read the unknown language on a food can labeled herring. When the Titans attack, the senior Scouts hold them off while the 104th Cadets defend against smaller Titans that have breached the castle. Reiner has his arm injured after it is bitten by a Titan. The Beast Titan throws chunks of Wall Rose at the castle, killing the group's horses. A second wave of Titans attack, and the senior soldiers are overwhelmed and killed. As the Titans surround the tower the unarmed 104th Cadets are on, Ymir unexpectedly transforms into a Titan to fight them, shocking everyone.
30	5	"Historia"; Transliteration: "Hisutoria" (Japanese: ヒストリア)	Tetsuya Wakano	Yasuko Kobayashi	Tetsuya Wakano, Takayuki Hirao	April 29, 2017	May 21, 2017
In the past, Christa and Ymir became lost in a blizzard during their winter training in the mountains while trying to save fellow cadet Daz. Ymir accused Christa of having a death wish rather than saving Daz for selfless reasons. She was aware that Christa is the illegitimate daughter of a nobleman's mistress who was forced by the Wall Cult to change her name and join the army to avoid disgrace. Ymir made Christa promise that she must live life on her own terms if she ever reveals her true name. In the present, Ymir transforms into a small intelligent Titan, fights off the other Titans, and saves everyone. Just as the Titans overwhelm her, Hange and the other Scouts arrive in time to save her and the 104th Cadets. Before the gravely-injured Ymir loses consciousness, Christa reveals that her real name is Historia Reiss.
31	6	"Warrior"; Transliteration: "Senshi" (Japanese: 戦士)	Hiroyuki Tanaka	Hiroshi Seko	Hiroyuki Tanaka	May 6, 2017	June 4, 2017
Hannes reports that the walls were never breached, leaving it up in the air just how the Titans invaded from outside. The Scouts prepare to take the comatose Ymir to the Trost District for medical care, knowing she holds valuable information about humanity. Just then, Eren learns that Reiner and Bertholdt are the Armored Titan and Colossal Titan respectively, the ones who had attacked his hometown five years ago. Their mission is to destroy all of humanity. Twelve hours earlier in the Ehrmich District, Hange explained that the background report she'd received on Annie suggested a connection with Reiner and Bertholdt, as all three are from the same area. The Scouts realize that the pair may have helped Annie find Eren during the 57th Expedition. In the present, Reiner and Bertholdt transform and grab Eren and Ymir. Feeling betrayed about who he'd thought were his friends, Eren transforms to fight.
32	7	"Close Combat"; Transliteration: "Da - Tō - Kyoku" (Japanese: 打・投・極)	Takayuki Hirao	Hiroshi Seko	Takayuki Hirao	May 13, 2017	June 11, 2017
As Eren and the Armored Titan battle, the Colossal Titan consumes Ymir and a Scout. Hange and the others try to attack but the Colossal Titan releases an enormous amount of steam, scorching and wounding several of them and preventing further attacks. The Armored Titan gains the upper hand but Eren uses hand-to-hand combat techniques that he learned from Annie during their recruit training, enabling him to inflict serious damage. Eren listens when Armin implores him to fall back to the wall for his own safety. As the Armored Titan charges once more, Eren utilizes grappling techniques advised by Hange to overcome his strength disadvantage. He is nearly successful at beheading the Armored Titan and extracting the human Reiner from within, only to be foiled when the Armored Titan roars for assistance. The Colossal Titan deteriorates and plummets toward them, sure to crush them both.
33	8	"The Hunters"; Transliteration: "Ou Mono" (Japanese: 迫う者)	Yūmi Kawai	Yasuko Kobayashi	Ryōtarō Makihara	May 20, 2017	June 18, 2017
The Colossal Titan hits the ground, releasing a massive amount of steam. The Armored Titan uses the distraction to extract Eren while Bertholdt carries the unconscious Ymir; both flee with their hostages. Five hours later, the military divisions in the Trost District are informed of the battle. Mikasa is distraught but Armin tells her nothing can be done in their current state, as many of the soldiers, including Hange, were injured from the steam. Erwin arrives with reinforcements. Hange posits that Reiner and Bertholdt may seek refuge within the Forest of Giant Trees to rest until nightfall so as to avoid encountering other Titans, assuming their goal is to relocate outside Wall Maria. Eren wakes up in the forest to find Ymir beside him as their bodies are slowly regenerating their missing limbs, Reiner and Bertholdt keeping watch. The Scouts depart from Wall Rose and begin the rescue operation.
34	9	"Opening"; Transliteration: "Kaikō" (Japanese: 開口)	Yoshihide Ibata	Yasuko Kobayashi	Yoshihide Ibata	May 27, 2017	June 25, 2017
Left behind due to injury, Hange requests to go to Ragako to see the immobilized Titan, as she has a hunch she wants to confirm. Moblit goes instead since she isn't in a state fit to travel. In the Forest of Giant Trees, as Eren and Ymir continue to regenerate their limbs, they learn that Reiner and Bertholdt plan to take them to their hometown, waiting until nightfall when the surrounding Titans cannot move. Reiner begins to ramble about his duty as a soldier and a warrior; Ymir deduces that he is confused between his undercover and real personas, since he's spent so long acting like a Scout. Ymir is concerned about the Beast Titan, who may be their true enemy. Reiner uses Ymir's concern for Historia as leverage to drive a wedge between her and Eren. The group then sees and hears the flare guns, signalling the arrival of the Scouts.
35	10	"Children"; Transliteration: "Kodomotachi" (Japanese: 子供達)	Kenji Imura	Hiroshi Seko	Masayuki Miyaji	June 3, 2017	July 9, 2017
In Ragako, Moblit realizes that the disabled Titan is, in fact, Conny's mother. Ymir's past is shown in a flashback; as a child, she was worshipped by a cult. The cult was later apprehended and punished by soldiers; each was injected with something, including Ymir, and thrown off the wall, resulting them transforming into Pure Titans. Ymir spent the next sixty years as a Titan until she ate Marcel, a childhood friend of Reiner and Bertholdt's, which returned her to human form. After accepting her true identity, she met Historia and empathized with her, as Historia's predicament was similar. In the present, Ymir convinces Reiner and Bertholdt to allow her to transform and take Historia with them. When the Scouts enter the forest, Ymir swallows Historia. Reiner transforms and flees with Bertholdt, Eren and Ymir riding on his shoulders. However, the Scouts give chase.
36	11	"Charge"; Transliteration: "Totsugeki" (Japanese: 突撃)	Hiroyuki Tanaka, Yasuhiro Akamatsu	Hiroshi Seko	Takayuki Hirao	June 10, 2017	July 16, 2017
Ymir regurgitates Historia as the Scouts close in. The 104th Cadets try and reason with Bertholdt, who cries that though his time with them wasn't a lie, there is no turning back from their mission to bring Eren "home." Erwin leads the Scouts to lure a big group of Titans toward them and the Armored Titan, who is consequently attacked by the Titans, forcing him to fight and leave Bertholdt defenseless. Despite Erwin's right arm being bitten off and Scouts being eaten, Armin manages to distract Bertholdt with a lie, allowing them to rescue Eren. Conny and Sasha grab Historia from Ymir. The Scouts' retreat is blocked when the Armored Titan throws Titans at them, knocking Eren and Mikasa off their horse. The pair come face-to-face with the Smiling Titan that ate Eren's mother, Carla Jaeger.
37	12	"Scream"; Transliteration: "Sakebi" (Japanese: 叫び)	Satonobu Kikuchi, Takayuki Hirao, Tetsurō Araki, Yoshihide Ibata	Yasuko Kobayashi	Yuzo Sato, Ryōtarō Makihara	June 17, 2017	July 23, 2017
Hannes sacrifices himself protecting Eren and Mikasa from the Smiling Titan. Eren breaks down, unable to transform to help, but Mikasa inspires him to keep trying. Eren activates an unknown power within him, as when he roars a battle cry, the Titans leave the Scouts alone and go devour the Smiling Titan. This makes Ymir realize that Reiner and Bertholdt want Eren because he possesses the Coordinate, the ability to control other Titans. The surviving Scouts escape after Eren causes the Titans to go after the Armored Titan next. Ymir leaves Historia to save Reiner and Bertholdt. A week later, Hange and Conny give a report to Erwin, healing from losing his arm, Levi, and Dot Pyxis that reveals that the Titans that appeared in Wall Rose were the citizens of Ragako, meaning that Titans are, in fact, humans. Remembering how many died to rescue him, Eren vows to use his new power to help humanity. Meanwhile, the Beast Titan looks out from atop Wall Maria, as a mysterious man emerges from its back, declaring "not just yet".

== Music ==
Sawano returned to compose the soundtrack for the second season, with the 2-CD soundtrack released on June 7, 2017, by Pony Canyon. In addition to music composed for Season 2, the soundtrack also featured any and all tracks composed for other media in-between seasons one and two, such as compilation films and OVAs.

Vocals were provided by Yosh from Survive Said the Prophet, Gemie, mpi, Mica Caldito, Mika Kobayashi and Benjamin.

== Home media release ==
=== Japanese ===
Pony Canyon (Japan – Region 2/A)
Vol.	Episodes	Release date	Ref.
1	26–31	June 21, 2017	
2	32–37	August 18, 2017	

=== English ===
Funimation (North America – Region 1/A)
Vol.	Episodes	Release date	Ref.
1	26–37	February 27, 2018	

Sony Pictures UK (British Isles – Region 2/B)
Vol.	Episodes	Release date	Ref.
1	26–37	February 26, 2018	

Madman Entertainment (Australasia – Region 4/B)
Vol.	Episodes	Release date	Ref.
1	26–37	April 11, 2018	
