= O1 (album) =

o1

Studio album by SawanoHiroyuki[nZk]
- Released: 9 September 2015
- Studios: Studio Sound Valley; Avaco Creative Studio; Studio GreenBird; LAB Recorders
- Genres: Pop; rock
- Length: 61:04
- Label: SME
- Producer: Hiroyuki Sawano

SawanoHiroyuki[nZk] chronology
UnChild (2014)	o1 (2015)	2V-ALK (2017)

Singles from o1
- 1. "A/Z" Released: 10 September 2014; 2. "aLIEz" Released: 10 September 2014; 3. "&Z" Released: 4 February 2015; 4. "X.U" Released: 20 May 2015; 5. "scaPEGoat" Released: 20 May 2015

o1 is the first studio album by Hiroyuki Sawano's vocal project SawanoHiroyuki[nZk]. It was released on September 9, 2015, on SME Records. o1 was preceded by the singles "A/Z", "aLIEz", "&Z", "X.U." and "scaPEGoat".

The album charted #7 daily rank for first week. It charted so far 11 weeks in the Oricon charts.

== Background ==
"A/Z" was used in the anime television series "Aldnoah.Zero" as the first ending theme, while "aLIEz" was used as the second ending theme. "&Z" was used in Aldnoah Zero's second season as the opening theme.

"X.U." was used as the opening theme for the anime television series "Seraph of the End", while "scaPEGoat" was used as the ending theme.

== Track listing ==
All music is composed by Hiroyuki Sawano.

No.	Title	Lyrics	Performed by	Length
1.	"[nZk]o1"		SawanoHiroyuki[nZk]	5:31
2.	"Pretenders"	cAnON.	SawanoHiroyuki[nZk]:mica&Gemie	3:42
3.	"X.U."	Benjamin; mpi	SawanoHiroyuki[nZk]:Gemie	4:44
4.	"A/Z"	Hiroyuki Sawano	SawanoHiroyuki[nZk]:mizuki	5:18
5.	"scaPEGoat"	Sawano; Benjamin; mpi	SawanoHiroyuki[nZk]:Yosh	5:08
6.	"oI"	Sawano	SawanoHiroyuki[nZk]:mizuki	4:55
7.	"Song of ..<AM>"	cAnON.; Benjamin; mpi	SawanoHiroyuki[nZk]:Aimer	4:20
8.	"Saving Us"	Benjamin; mpi	SawanoHiroyuki[nZk]:Gemie	4:43
9.	"aLIEz"	Sawano	SawanoHiroyuki[nZk]:mizuki	4:28
10.	"Rise Above"	Yosh	SawanoHiroyuki[nZk]:Yosh	3:32
11.	"Summer Tears"	Benjamin; mpi	SawanoHiroyuki[nZk]:mica	3:17
12.	"&Z"	Sawano; mpi	SawanoHiroyuki[nZk]:mizuki	4:41
13.	"s-AVE"	Hiroyuki Sawano	SawanoHiroyuki[nZk]:Aimer	4:35
14.	"out01nzk"		SawanoHiroyuki[nZk]	2:10
Total length:				61:04

DVD - Only in the limited edition
No.	Title	Director	Length
1.	"A/Z" (Music Video)	TAKCOM	5:16
2.	"&Z" (Music Video)	Ryohei Shingu	4:44
3.	"X.U." (short ver. music video)	maxilla	2:33
4.	"scaPEGoat" (Music Video)	maxilla	5:11
5.	"s-AVE" (Music Video)	Tatsunori Sato	4:40
6.	"βios ～ Before my body is dry" (from STUDIO LIVE [nZk] 002.5)		5:51
7.	"BRE@TH//LESS" (from STUDIO LIVE [nZk] 002.5)		4:06
8.	"&Z" (from STUDIO LIVE [nZk] 002.5)		4:39
9.	"Keep on keeping on" (from STUDIO LIVE [nZk] 002.5)		3:56
Total length:			41:16

== Credits ==
Adapted from Booklet.

Production
- Hiroyuki Sawano – arranger, producer, programming
- Yasushi Horiguchi – director, executive producer
- Daisuke Katsurada – executive producer
- Mitsunori Aizawa – recording, mixing engineer & Pro Tools operator
- Sho Suzuki – assistant engineer
- Seiya Kawagoe – assistant engineer
- Eriko Ijima – assistant engineer
- Sora Tamiya – assistant engineer
- Yuji Chinone – mastering
- Giottographica – art direction & design
- Michito Goto – photographer
- Aya Murakami – hair & make-up
- Tatsuhiko Marumoto – styling
- Yuko Mori – products coordination
- Toru Takeuchi – a&r
- Takeshi Tomaru – a&r
- Harumi Okuma – a&r assistant
- SME Records Promotion Room – media promotion
- Yu Tsuzuki – sales promotion
- Mitsuki Hirabayashi – digital promotion
- Keiichi Tonomura – supervise

Management Staff

Hiroyuki Sawano:

- Akiko Shimodoi
- Hajime Sakai

Aimer:

- Yasuhisa Ichikawa
- Mami Fujino

Yosh (Survive Said the Prophet):

- Hayato Taguchi

mizuki:

- Yoshiki Konno

Vocals

- v[nZk]v – vocals (track 1)
- Mica Caldito – vocals (tracks 2, 11)
- Gemie – vocals (tracks 2,3, 8)
- mizuki – vocals (tracks 4, 6, 9, 12)
- Yosh Morita – vocals (tracks 5, 10)
- Aimer – vocals (tracks 7, 13)

Instruments

- Hiroyuki Sawano – piano (#1–5, 7–14), keyboards (#1–6, 8–13), all other instruments (all tracks)
- Yu "masshoi" Yamauchi – drums (tracks 1–5, 7–13)
- Hiroshi Iimuro – guitar (tracks 1, 3, 5, 9, 10, 12)
- Masayoshi Furukawa – guitar (tracks 3, 5)
- Tetsuro Toyama – guitar (track 4)
- Toshino Tanabe – bass (tracks 1–13)
- Daisensei Muroya Strings – strings (tracks 7, 8)
- Koichiro Muroya – violin (track 1)
- Harutoshi Ito – cello (tracks 1, 7, 14), guitar (tracks 1, 2, 6, 7, 8, 11, 13)
