= Mika Kobayashi =

Mika Kobayashi 小林未郁
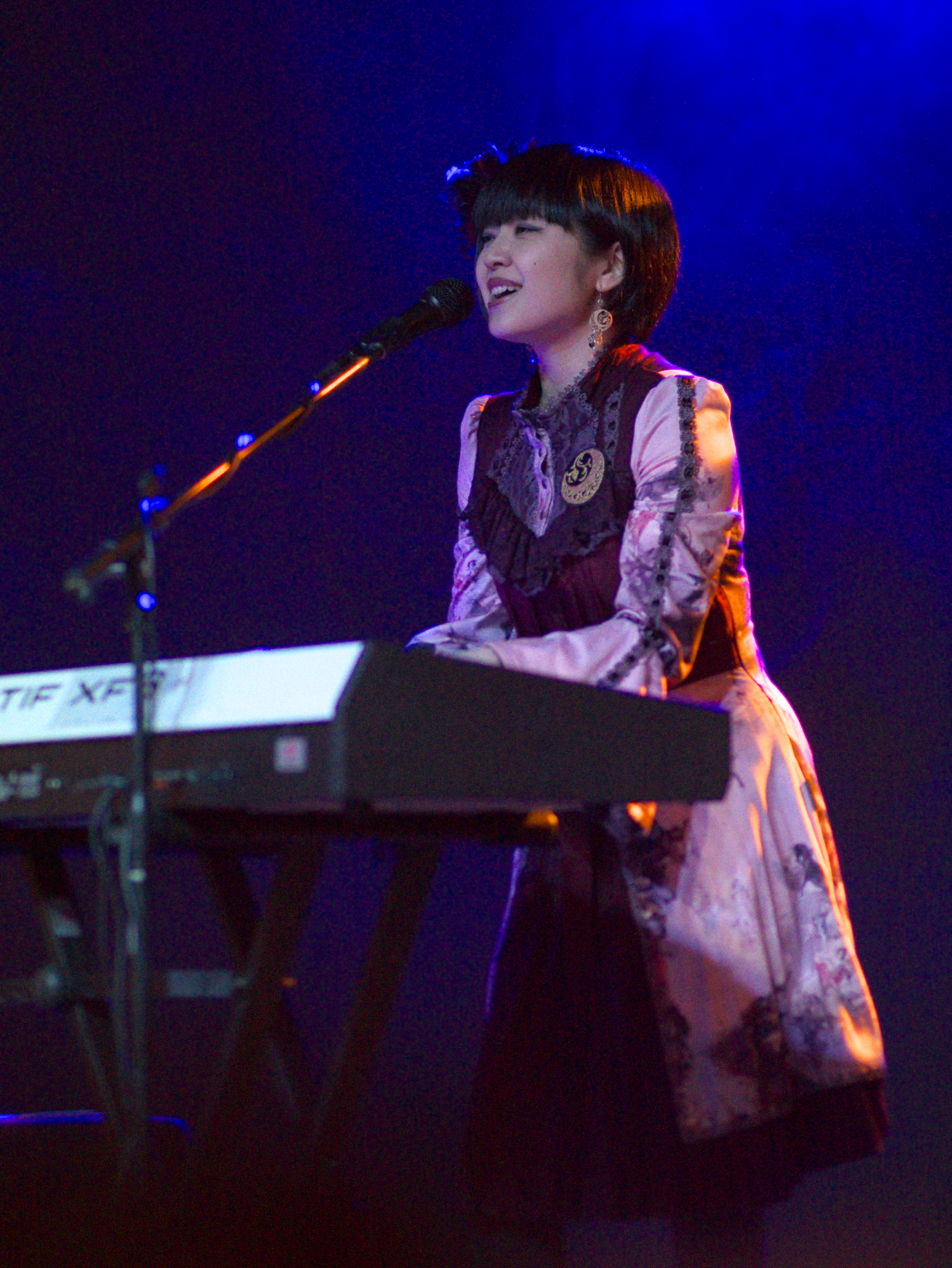
- Kobayashi in 2019

Background information
- Born: May 31, 1978 (age 48); Hiroshima, Japan
- Genre: Pop rock
- Occupations: Musician; singer
- Instrument: Vocals
- Years active: 2010–present
- Label: miccabose
- Website: miccabose.com

Mika Kobayashi (小林未郁, Kobayashi Mika; born May 31, 1978) is a Japanese singer and songwriter. She is usually chosen as a vocalist by Hiroyuki Sawano. She is the voice behind some anime songs, like Attack on Titan, Kill la Kill, Blue Exorcist, Seraph of the End, and Mobile Suit Gundam Unicorn; she has also sung songs for video games like Final Fantasy XI and Xenoblade Chronicles X.

== Life and career ==
Kobayashi was born on May 31, 1978, in Hiroshima.

In 2010, she started to perform abroad, which she tends to do annually, mainly in Europe. She also performs with Kengishu KAMUI, during such performances, she sings and plays the piano while they perform samurai moves.

In 2016, she created her own record label, Miccabose.

In 2019, she came to Brazil to perform at Anime Friends, one year after she released the album "Mika Type Ro". She also performed in Thailand for the second time, where she revealed her work process with Sawano consists of receiving a demo from him and sing according to her own feelings. However, when it comes to her personal albums, she writes her own songs, using a piano.

In 2023, she performed in Saudi Arabia. In 2024, she performed in Brasília at Anime Summit.

== Discography ==
=== Songs in anime ===
- "βios", in Guilty Crown
- "βios - Delta", in Guilty Crown
- "Before My Body Is Dry", in Kill la Kill
- "Through My Blood", in Kabaneri of the Iron Fortress
- "Attack on Titan", in Attack on Titan
- "Yamanai Ame", in Attack on Titan – Part 1: Crimson Bow and Arrow
- "Baukloetze", in Attack on Titan
- "Call Me Later", in Blue Exorcist
- "Jump: Mayppai Dakishimete", in Hand Maid May
- "Ego", in Mobile Suit Gundam Unicorn
- "Breathless", in Aldnoah.Zero
- "Yokoshima Chi no Shoujo Main Theme", in The Promised Neverland

=== Songs in video games ===
- "Forever Today", in Final Fantasy XI
- "Your Voice", in Xenoblade Chronicles X
- "Uncontrollable", in Xenoblade Chronicles X
- "Houkai Sekai no Utahime (Honkai World Diva)", in Honkai Impact 3
- "Vernal Days Dreamed by the Star", in Wuthering Waves
- "Beyond This Station", in Honkai: Star Rail
- "A Light That Transcends A Thousand Years", in Stella Sora

=== As featured artist ===
- "The Last Song", with Starrysky
