= Sacra Music =

Japanese record label

- Parent company: Sony Music Labels Inc.
- Founded: 2017; 9 years ago
- Distributor: Sony Music Solutions
- Genre: J-Pop, anison, rock
- Country of origin: Japan
- Official website: sacramusic.jp

Sacra Music (stylized in all caps) is a Japanese record label owned by Sony Music Labels Inc., a subsidiary of Sony Music Entertainment Japan. The record label specializes in anison music.

== History ==
Sacra Music was established on April 1, 2017, by Sony Music Labels. Initially launching with 14 artists that were previously under other Sony Music Labels imprints, the company revealed the label would strengthen global activities for its artists in partnership with the overseas strategies of Aniplex. Vocal group Kalafina's double A-side single "Into the World / Märchen" served as the label's first release. On June 7, 2017, Sacra Music signed its first artist that previously was not associated with Sony Music Labels, Soma Saito.

== Current artists ==
| Artists | Year Attached | Previous Label | Source |
|---|---|---|---|
| =Love | 2017 | —N/a | |
| Aimer | 2021 | SME | |
| ASCA | 2017 | Media Factory | |
| ClariS | 2017 | SME | |
| FictionJunction | 2023 | Flying Dog | |
| Flow | 2020 | Kioon | |
| Halca | 2018 | —N/a | |
| Lisa | 2017 | Aniplex | |
| Miki Satō | 2020 | —N/a | |
| MIMiNARI | 2022 | | |
| Nami Tamaki | 2024 | Lantis | |
| Penguin Research | 2017 | SME | |
| Rei Yasuda | 2023 | Sony | |
| ReoNa | 2018 | —N/a | |
| Sangatsu no Phantasia | 2018 | Kioon | |
| SawanoHiroyuki[nZk] | 2017 | SME | |
| Sawa Angstrom | 2023 | Thanks Giving | |
| SennaRin | 2022 | —N/a | |
| Shuka Saitō | 2019 | —N/a | |
| Soma Saito | 2017 | —N/a | |
| Spira Spica | 2018 | —N/a | |
| Tomori Kusunoki | 2020 | —N/a | |
| TrySail | 2017 | Aniplex | |
| Who-ya Extended | 2022 | SME | |
| Suisoh | 2025 | Universal Music Japan | |

== Formerly attached artists ==
| Artist | Year attached | Previous label | End of contract | Remarks | Source |
|---|---|---|---|---|---|
| Tsukicro | 2017 | SME Records | 2018 | End of management contract. | |
| Kalafina | 2017 | SME Records | March 2019 | Disbanded | |
| Garnidelia | 2017 | SME Records | August 2019 | End of management contract. Moved to Universal Music Japan → Pony Canyon | |
| Tomohisa Sako | 2017 | SME Records | March 2019 | End of management contract. Moved to Avex Inc. | |
| ZAMB | 2020 | D-GO | December 2020 | End of management contract. | |
| Elisa | 2018 | SME Records | March 2021 | End of management contract. | |
| Kana Hanazawa | 2017 | Aniplex | June 2021 | End of management contract. Moved to Pony Canyon in July 2021 | |
| Luna Haruna | 2017 | SME Records | September 2021 | End of management contract. | |
| Mashiro Ayano | 2017 | Ariola Japan | December 2021 | End of Management contract. | |
| Egoist | 2017 | Sony Music Records | October 2023 | Disbanded | |
| EXiNA | 2019 | FlyingDog | September 2023 | End of management contract. Restart of solo project. | |
| Eir Aoi | 2018 | SME Records | December 2023 | End of management contract. Start of solo project. Moved to Lantis in February 2026 | |
| Kaguya Luna | 2018 | —N/a | Not clear | | |
| Mito Tsukino | 2020 | —N/a | Not clear | | |
