= Mobile Suit Gundam: Hathaway =

2021 animated film by Shūkō Murase

- Theatrical release poster
- 機動戦士ガンダム 閃光のハサウェイ; Kidō Senshi Gandamu Senkō no Hasauei
- Directed by: Shūkō Murase
- Screenplay by: Yasuyuki Muto
- Based on: Mobile Suit Gundam: Hathaway's Flash by Hajime Yatate & Yoshiyuki Tomino
- Produced by: Naohiro Ogata
- Starring: Kensho Ono; Reina Ueda; Junichi Suwabe; Soma Saito; Tōru Furuya
- Cinematography: Kenta Hayashi
- Edited by: Daisuke Imai
- Music by: Hiroyuki Sawano
- Production company: Sunrise
- Distributed by: Shochiku
- Release date: June 11, 2021
- Running time: 95 minutes
- Country: Japan
- Language: Japanese
- Box office: ¥2.23 billion (Japan)

Mobile Suit Gundam: Hathaway (Japanese: 機動戦士ガンダム 閃光のハサウェイ, Hepburn: Kidō Senshi Gandamu Senkō no Hasauei; lit. 'Mobile Suit Gundam: Hathaway's Flash') is a Japanese science fiction animated film and the first part of a planned trilogy in the Gundam franchise. Adapted from the 1989–1990 novel of the same name by Yoshiyuki Tomino, it is directed by Shuko Murase, written by Yasuyuki Muto, scored by Hiroyuki Sawano, and animated by Sunrise.

Planned as the first of a trilogy, the film was originally set for release on July 23, 2020, but was delayed to May 2021 due to the COVID-19 pandemic in Japan, and later to June 11, 2021, due to extended emergency declarations. It screened at the 24th Shanghai International Film Festival on the same day and was later streamed on platforms like Bilibili in China and Netflix globally in July.

Set in the Universal Century timeline after Mobile Suit Gundam: Char's Counterattack, the story follows Hathaway Noa, who, inspired by Amuro Ray and Char Aznable, leads the anti-Earth Federation group Mafty to resist the Federation's deepening corruption. His encounters with Federation officer Kenneth Sleg and the mysterious Gigi Andalusia profoundly impact their lives.

The film received widespread praise for its stunning visuals and meticulous production, though some criticized overly dark color grading and compressed storytelling. It grossed ¥2.23 billion, ranking 14th among Japanese films in 2021.

== Overview ==
As part of the Universal Century's series, Hathaway follows Mobile Suit Gundam Narrative (2018) and is the second work in the "UC Next 0100" project, which explores events after Mobile Suit Gundam Unicorn in the Universal Century timeline. The story connects to the novel Beltorchika's Children and the 1988 film Mobile Suit Gundam: Char's Counterattack, with its protagonist and background rooted in both.

The film depicts Hathaway Noa, posing as a plant inspector, traveling to Earth to receive the new Mobile Suit Gundam. During a hijacking incident, he becomes entangled with Kenneth Sleg and Gigi Andalusia. After a failed diversionary attack by his allies, Hathaway executes a plan to receive the Gundam mid-air, defeating pursuing Federation forces, and proceeds with Mafty to a new base.

== Plot ==
=== Background ===
Set in the Universal Century in U.C. 0105, twelve years after Mobile Suit Gundam: Char's Counterattack, humanity has migrated to space colonies due to overpopulation. Resistance against the Earth Federation's oppressive policies led some colonies to declare independence as the Principality of Zeon, sparking the One Year War, which Zeon lost. Conflicts persisted for nearly 20 years until Zeon's remnants faded by U.C. 0100. By U.C. 0105, the Federation's corruption has worsened, exacerbating Earth's pollution and enforcing inhumane immigration policies via the "Man Hunter" organization. The anti-Federation group Mafty, led by Hathaway, gains support by assassinating Federation officials through terrorist acts.

Hathaway Noa, son of Federation legend Bright Noa, appeared in Mobile Suit Zeta Gundam and Mobile Suit Gundam: Char's Counterattack. Witnessing Char Aznable's war and losing his love Quess Paraya, Hathaway embraces Amuro's humanism and Char's revolutionary ideals, leading Mafty as "Mafty Navue Erin" to resist the Federation.

Mobile Suit technology, developed during the One Year War, faced limitations on Earth. By U.C. 0105, the Minovsky Flight System enables high-speed flight in gravity without transformation, used in prototypes like the Penelope and Gundam.

=== Synopsis ===
Hathaway Noa, posing as a botanical observer, travels from the lunar city Von Braun to Hong Kong on Haunzen Flight 365, which is hijacked by terrorists claiming to be Mafty. Alongside Federation Colonel Kenneth Sleg, he subdues the hijackers, and the flight lands in Davao City. Detained for questioning, Hathaway is approached by Gigi Andalusia, who hints at knowing his true identity as Mafty's leader. At her insistence, they share a hotel suite. To deflect suspicion, Hathaway orchestrates a Mafty attack by the Messer unit on their hotel, aiming to create chaos and escape Federation surveillance. The attack fails due to the Federation's swift response, and a Mafty pilot, Gawman, is captured.

After evading further investigation, Hathaway reunites with Mafty allies hidden among islands. Using their equipment, he receives the Ξ Gundam mid-air from the cargo ship "Cargo Pisa" during re-entry. Meanwhile, Kenneth, alerted by Gigi's remarks, suspects Hathaway's identity and tracks Mafty's movements. The captured Gawman, interrogated harshly by Kenneth, is taken into the Penelope's cockpit as a hostage. As Hathaway receives the Ξ Gundam in the thermosphere, Federation pilot Lane Aim in the Penelope intercepts him. During combat, Hathaway confirms Gawman's presence and appeals to Lane, who allows Gawman's release. Gawman is transferred mid-air to Hathaway's Ξ Gundam. Hathaway distracts Lane with a discarded rifle and ambushes the Penelope with missiles, heavily damaging it, though Lane survives. Hathaway and Mafty escape on the support ship "Valiant." A post-credits image shows a bloody conflict in Oenpelli.

== Context ==
The film, with a runtime of 95 minutes, is adapted from the three-volume novel Mobile Suit Gundam: Hathaway's Flash by Yoshiyuki Tomino, the creator of Mobile Suit Gundam, published between 1989 and 1990. As a sequel to the film Mobile Suit Gundam: Char's Counterattack, it depicts the aftermath of Char Aznable's plan to attack Earth in March U.C. 0093, which was thwarted by the Earth Federation's Londo Bell unit, leading to a gradual subsiding of conflicts between Neo Zeon and the Earth Federation. In U.C. 0100, after the Republic of Zeon in SIDE 3 relinquishes its autonomy, the Earth Sphere appears to have achieved reunification. Twelve years after Char's rebellion, the Federation descends into authoritarianism and bureaucratic corruption, and amid internal corruption and accelerating environmental degradation on Earth, it seeks to pass legislation reserving the planet for the privileged elite. To enforce this, a special police unit called "Man Hunter" is established, brutally targeting civilians illegally residing on Earth. Against this backdrop, a high-ranking Federation officer, under the alias "Quack Salver", forms a clandestine anti-government organization named "Mafty Navue Erin" and initiates a series of assassinations targeting Federation officials. Hathaway Noa, son of the legendary Federation captain Bright Noa, emerges as a fighter inheriting the ideals of both Amuro Ray and Char Aznable, joining and leading Mafty in its operations against the Federation government.

The original novel's storyline continues from another of Tomino's novels, Mobile Suit Gundam: Char's Counterattack – Beltorchika's Children. This novel is considered an adaptation of the initial draft of the film Char's Counterattack. The novel version of Char's Counterattack was serialized in Tokuma Shoten's magazine Animage under the title Mobile Suit Gundam: High Streamer. (Note: Originally published under the title Mobile Suit Gundam: Char's Counterattack in the Animage Bunko series from December 1987 to March 1988, it was reissued in 2002 with updated illustrations under the new title Mobile Suit Gundam: Hi Streamer.) Both novels preceded the release of the film version. (Note: Mobile Suit Gundam: Hi Streamer (originally titled Mobile Suit Gundam: Char's Counterattack) was first published and completed in March 1998. Mobile Suit Gundam: Char's Counterattack – Beltorchika's Children was first published in February 1988, while the film Char's Counterattack was released on March 12, 1988.)

During an online press conference in March 2020, producer Naohiro Ogata stated that the film would continue the storyline from the March 12, 1988, theatrical release of Char's Counterattack while incorporating elements from the novel Beltorchika's Children. The film and novel versions of ''Char's Counterattack'' are parallel works with notable plot differences, posing challenges for the official film adaptation. In the novel ''Beltorchika's Children'', Quess Paraya is killed by Hathaway himself, an event that becomes a recurring nightmare for him. In contrast, in the film ''Char's Counterattack'', Quess sacrifices herself to protect Hathaway by pushing his mobile suit out of harm's way, only to be fatally shot by Amuro's girlfriend Chan Agi, after which Hathaway, in shock and mental turmoil, kills Chan.

== Production ==
Production Team
Planning, Animation Production	Sunrise
Original Work	Yoshiyuki Tomino, Hajime Yatate
Director	Shuko Murase
Screenplay	Yasuyuki Muto
Character Design	Pablo Uchida, Naoyuki Onda, Shigenori Kageyama
Original Character Design	Haruhiko Mikimoto
Mechanical Design	Hajime Katoki, Kimitoshi Yamane, Seiichi Nakatani, Nobuhiko Genma
Original Mechanical Design	Yasushi Moriki, Hajime Katoki
Chief Animation Director	Naoyuki Onda
Color Design	Takako Suzuki
Director of Photography	Kentarō Waki
CGI Directors	Ryukou Masuo, Tomohiro Fujie
Editing	Daisuje "I" Imai
Sound Director	Hiroshi Kasamatsu
Recording Director	Eriko Kimura
Music	Hiroyuki Sawano
Animation Studio	Sunrise Studio 1
Distributor	Shochiku

Adapted from the first volume of Mobile Suit Gundam: Hathaway's Flash, the film was directed by Shūkō Murase, previously involved in Genocidal Organ, Mobile Suit Gundam Wing character design, and animation for Mobile Suit Gundam F91 and Mobile Suit Gundam Unicorn. The screenplay was by Yasuyuki Muto, known for Gundam Unicorn, with mechanical design led by Hajime Katoki. CGI directors Ryukou Masuo and Tomohiro Fujie handled 3D modeling, particularly for Mobile Suits. Editing was by Daisuke "D.I. Imai, character animation supervised by Takahiro Kimura, and chief animation by Naoyuki Onda. Takako Suzuki managed color design, and Kentarō Waki was director of photography. Sound director Hiroshi Kasamatsu, previously on Turn A Gundam, and recording director Eriko Kimura led audio production. Sunrise Studio 1, known for Gundam Unicorn and Mobile Suit Gundam Thunderbolt, handled animation, with Shochiku as distributor.

At a March 24, 2020, online conference, producer Naohiro Ogata noted the novel's 8 million copies sold, highlighting Tomino's prowess as a novelist. He emphasized the novel's relevance to modern issues like environmental problems, geopolitical conflicts, and terrorism, despite being written 30 years prior. Tomino, also a novelist, used novels as animation proposals, but the story missed earlier filming opportunities.

The team aimed to create a film appealing to current and future audiences. They consulted with original character designer Haruhiko Mikimoto, mechanical designer Yasuhiro Moriki, and voice actor Nozomu Sasaki. Tomino, critical of Mobile Suit Gundam Narrative's trailer, supported the adaptation, offering director Murase notes on triangular relationships inspired by Korean films. The film adopted a realistic approach. At Anime Japan 2021, team members, including Eiwa Hara, cinematographer Kentarō Waki, and production director Narumi Iwashita, discussed production challenges. Waki noted excessive layering for dark scenes increased workloads. As the trilogy's first part, production explored new techniques, abandoning traditional methods. Producer Naohiro Ogata stated the film moved away from conventional approaches, with the second and third parts to validate these methods. Director Murase emphasized visuals over dialogue, reducing lines compared to TV adaptations.

The voice cast was revamped to match character ages and support global expansion for the Gundam franchise's 40th anniversary. Kadokawa's Shinichiro Inoue noted long-standing calls to adapt the novel, but complex Mobile Suit designs posed challenges in the 1980s, resolved using 3DCG with hand-drawn enhancements. 3DCG depicted Mobile Suits flying under gravity, especially in the final battle. The theme song collaboration with Alexandros aligned with plans for international release, following Gundam NT's overseas success.

=== Scene design ===
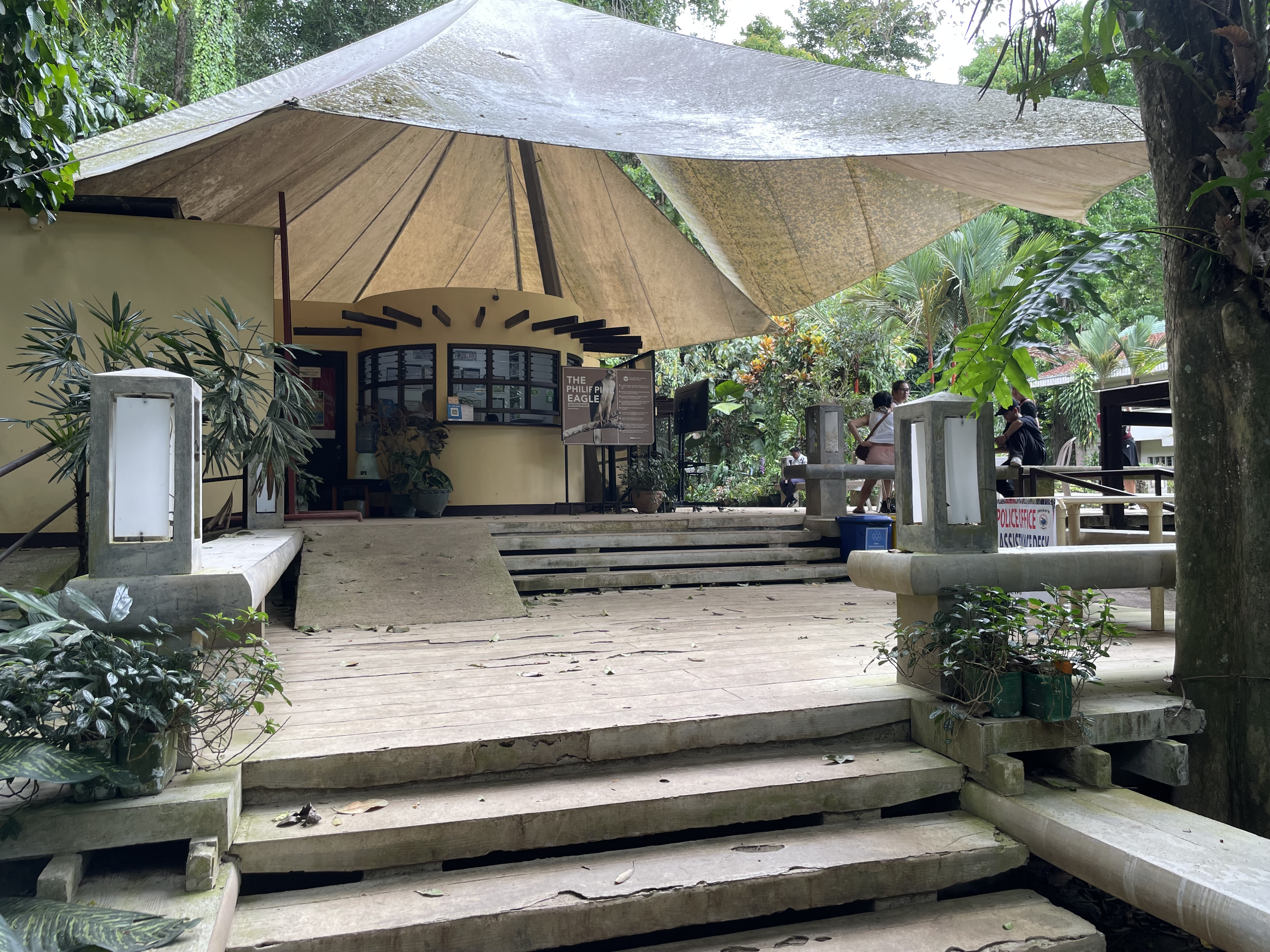
The Philippine Eagle Foundation Visitor Center, one of the film's filming locations.

To address regrets from not scouting Hong Kong for Mobile Suit Zeta Gundam, the team conducted a day-and-a-half location scout in Davao to enhance visuals. Davao's sky, waterfront, and sea impressed the director. Set primarily in the Philippines, the team incorporated local elements to depict a futuristic city. Iconic buildings, the Jollibee fast-food chain, and local beverage brands like Summit were included. The film also scouted the Philippine Eagle Foundation in Calinan. Souvenirs and colorful taxis in Davao were creative additions by the design team.

In battle scenes, the Davao nighttime sequence focuses on civilians fleeing rather than Mobile Suit perspectives. In the novel, Hathaway receives the Ξ Gundam at 58 km altitude, but the film changes this to 150 km in satellite orbit. The "Pisa" cargo ship carrying the Ξ Gundam resembles JAXA's space station.

=== Character design ===
Character designs were originally by Haruhiko Mikimoto, known for Mobile Suit Gundam 0080: War in the Pocket and Macross, with film designs drawn by pablo uchida. Producer Naohiro Ogata chose Uchida, seen as a successor to Noriyoshi Ohrai, (Note: Japanese illustrator, died in 2015, known for posters for Star Wars, Godzilla, Romance of the Three Kingdoms, and Age of Sail games.) for his ability to balance innovation and quality. Hathaway's design was refined over five drafts by Onda Naoyuki. Gigi's design, based on Mikimoto's, included about ten outfits by Uchida. Kenneth's design avoided a Char-like blonde Caucasian look, opting for a youthful, relatable "big brother" image. Ogata noted Murase's strength in realistic character portrayals, unlike Tomino, who might have prioritized a new work over revisiting past ones.

For casting, Hathaway's role reflected his struggles post-Second Neo Zeon War and Quess Paraya's influence, leading to his darker personality and Mafty involvement. Kensho Ono was chosen for his ability to portray this complexity. Gigi, a mix of youthful and mature traits with vulnerability, was voiced by Reina Ueda, who captured her dual nature. Kenneth, balancing gentleness and military rigor, was voiced by Junichi Suwabe for his versatile voice. The love triangle among Hathaway, Gigi, and Kenneth drives the narrative, with Gigi's initial interest in Hathaway, Kenneth's feelings for Gigi, and Hathaway's restraint due to another relationship. As the story progresses, Gigi's romantic ties and Kenneth's confession deepen the plot.

Kensho Ono, who voiced a minor character in Mobile Suit Gundam: The Origin V: Clash at Loum, was thrilled to voice a Gundam protagonist. He recorded over three days, mostly with Reina Ueda and Junichi Suwabe, and the final day with Soma Saito (Lane). Koichi Yamadera, voicing the "Man Hunter" leader, previously voiced Gyunei Guss in Mobile Suit Gundam: Char's Counterattack, returning to Gundam after 33 years.

==== Character list ====
Character	Japanese Voice	Traits
Hathaway Noa (ハサウェイ・ノア) Mafty Nabiyy Erin (マフティー・ナビーユ・エリン)	Kensho Ono	Son of legendary captain Bright Noa, evolved from an impulsive youth to a bold revolutionary leading the anti-Federation group Mafty. Trained as a botanical observer under Professor Amada Mansan after a brief military career. Faces hijackers claiming to be Mafty on Haunzen Flight 356, subduing them with military-honed skills, earning praise from Federation officials. Secretly leads Mafty as "Mafty Nabiyy Erin."
Gigi Andalusia (ギギ・アンダルシア)	Reina Ueda	A beautiful young woman under 20, wealthy enough to board Haunzen Flight 356 to Hong Kong, and mistress to an 80-year-old earl, Cardeas. Her captivating appearance hides a candid personality and defiance of societal corruption. Possesses an ability to see through lies, unlocking Hathaway's past memories.
Kenneth Sleg (ケネス・スレッグ)	Junichi Suwabe	Federation colonel, fought in Char's Rebellion as a Mobile Suit pilot. Now commands the anti-Mafty unit, succeeding Kimberly Hayman, boarding Haunzen Flight 356 to Davao base. Sees Hathaway as an ideal pilot and responds swiftly to Mafty's city attack.
Lane Aim (レーン・エイム)	Soma Saito	Federation lieutenant under Kenneth, piloting the Penelope Mobile Suit. Hathaway compares Lane to his younger self.
Gawman Nobile (ガウマン・ノビル)	Kenjiro Tsuda	Mafty pilot with battle scars, experienced from multiple wars, piloting the "Messer 2" Mobile Suit. Captured after a failed attack in Davao.
Emeralda Zubin (エメラルダ・ズービン)	Yui Ishikawa	Mafty member with a big-sister vibe, sent to Davao to meet Hathaway, unable to become a pilot due to technical issues.
Raymond Cain (レイモンド・ケイン)	Fukushi Ochiai	Mafty member, captain of the Galcezon 1, rough exterior with a caring side.
Iram Masam (イラム・マサム)	Shunsuke Takeuchi	Mafty member, first mate on the "Valiant" support ship, a strategic and empathetic aide to Hathaway.
Mihesha Hans (ミヘッシャ・ヘンス)	Misato Matsuoka	Mafty agent and operator, a dedicated young woman trusting Hathaway, meets him in Davao with Mitsuda.
Mitsuda Kenji (ミツダ・ケンジ)	Chiharu Sawashiro	Mafty field agent and skilled driver, meets Hathaway in Davao.
Mace Flower (メイス・フラゥワー)	Atsumi Tanezaki	Haunzen Flight 356 attendant with curly hair and a mole, maturely handles Kenneth's advances.
Handley Yoksan (ハンドリー・ヨクサン)	Koichi Yamadera	"Man Hunter" police leader, travels on Haunzen Flight 356 to a meeting in Adelaide.
Gais H. Huguest (ゲイス・H・ヒューゲスト)	Nozomu Sasaki	Investigation bureau chief handling Hathaway's hijacking testimony.
Kelia Dace (ケリア・デース)	Saori Hayami	Mafty member, Hathaway's guide into the organization and his lover.
Quess Paraya (クェス・パラヤ)	Maria Kawamura	Hathaway's former crush, appeared in Mobile Suit Gundam: Char's Counterattack. Met Hathaway on a space shuttle, later joined Neo Zeon's Char, leading to a tragic battlefield reunion.
Amuro Ray (アムロ・レイ) (Note: This character does not appear in the original novel.)	Toru Furuya	Former Federation captain and Londo Bell Mobile Suit team leader, Bright Noa's comrade.

==== Other characters ====
Additional Mafty members are voiced by Kōhei Amasaki, Hikaru Tanaka, Yu Miyazaki, and others. Ministers arriving on Earth with Hathaway on the same flight are voiced by Shuuei Ikawa, Eiji Yoshitomi, and others, while hijackers are voiced by Yuuki Shin and others. Hinako Takahashi, daughter of former Hiroshima professional baseball player Yoshihiko Takahashi, voices a flight attendant on Haunzen Flight 356. Three members of the band Alexandros also voiced roles, portraying local Davao citizens. This marked their first time voicing roles in a film.

=== Mechanical design ===
The mechanical design for the original novel was handled by Yasuhiro Moriki, while the anime adaptation's mechanical designs were optimized by four designers: Hajime Katoki, Kimitoshi Yamane, Seiichi Nakatani, and Nobuhiko Genma. Seiichi Nakatani and Nobuhiko Genma, both experts in mechanical animation, contributed to the designs. Nakatani previously worked on Mobile Suit Gundam 00, Mobile Suit Gundam Reconguista in G, and Code Geass: Lelouch of the Rebellion, while Genma contributed to Mobile Suit Gundam Unicorn and Ghost in the Shell: Stand Alone Complex. Hajime Katoki developed the prototype designs based on Yasuhiro Moriki's concepts from the novel. Despite being 30 years old, the novel's designs were considered highly appealing. Nobuhiko Genma collaborated with director Shuko Murase and Katoki to refine the designs, with Nakatani finalizing the animation drafts. Genma noted that Moriki's initial Xi Gundam design aimed for a "de-Gundamized" aesthetic, described in the work as a "Gundam replica," leading to suggestions that it should resemble a monster with oversized hands and two faces rather than a traditional Gundam. Nakatani used materials like clay and paper to aid in the design and modeling process. Katoki discovered a white-painted Xi Gundam in the novel's copyright illustrations, differing from the traditional blue chest. Genma decided to adopt this white color scheme for the anime, emphasizing the two-faced design with a red chest section. The upper chest features a false Gundam face, while the true head conveys a monstrous, ferocious impression. Genma also remarked that Moriki's design diverged boldly from the traditional Gundam evolution. Before the first online press conference, the production team announced that the anime's mechanical designs would differ slightly from those in the novel's illustrations and games. The Xi Gundam, in particular, aligns more closely with the novel's design than its game versions.

Conversely, the Penelope's design aimed to appear as a Gundam only upon close inspection, featuring larger skirt-like components that give it a monstrous, non-humanoid appearance. From the Earth Federation's perspective, the Penelope is a legitimate Gundam, while the Xi Gundam is a counterfeit, so while the Penelope may not initially resemble a Gundam, it features the standard "Gundam face" upon closer examination. Director Shuko Murase's input gave the Penelope a "wyvern" vibe in its flight mode. Its unique sound effects and glowing parts further enhance its monstrous appearance. Hidekazu Hara noted that the glowing yellow parts of the Penelope, dubbed the "Chiton treatment" within the team, were refined based on Murase's suggestions.

As one of the longest-running mecha anime franchises, the Gundam series is renowned for its use of hand-drawn animation to depict mobile suit battles. The original novel, published in the late 1980s and early 1990s, was considered nearly impossible to adapt into animation due to the complex shapes and lines of its mobile suits, which posed significant challenges for hand-drawn animation. To address this, the film adaptation of Hathaway's Flash utilized 3DCG to depict the mobile suits. The production team discovered that 3DCG offered enhanced expressiveness for visual details. Nakatani noted that while the Penelope could be modeled based on Katoki's existing designs, the Xi Gundam was created entirely from scratch in 3DCG.

=== Featured mobile suits ===
==== Xi Gundam (Ξガンダム, XI GUNDAM) ====
The Xi Gundam, the protagonist's mobile suit, was secretly built by Anaheim Electronics for the Mafty organization, piloted by Hathaway Noa. Its name, derived from the 14th Greek letter "Xi," signifies its status as a successor to the Nu Gundam piloted by Amuro Ray in Mobile Suit Gundam: Char's Counterattack. This large mobile suit, resembling kacchu armor with its broad shoulders, stands 26 meters tall and weighs 80 tons. Its primary weapons include funnel missiles, similar to the Nu Gundam's fin funnels, mounted in its rear armor. As a fifth-generation mobile suit, it features a Minovsky Flight System for extended atmospheric flight without external support. Standard missile launchers are embedded in its oversized wrists and leg armor, with three launchers per elbow and knee. Additional firepower is mounted in the shoulder armor, and its primary defense is a beam barrier across its body. It also carries a shield with an integrated beam cannon. The Xi Gundam's color scheme and design differ slightly from its novel and game appearances, transitioning from Moriki's blue to a white scheme in the film.

==== Messer (メッサー, MESSER) ====
The Messer, a mainstay of the Mafty organization, was developed by Anaheim Electronics based on the Geara Doga from the Second Neo Zeon War. It features a Zeon-style mono-eye design to symbolize its resistance to the Earth Federation. Despite its heavy armor, the Messer retains high mobility due to its numerous thrusters. Its armaments include a beam rifle, a standard beam saber, a large shield on its left arm, and Zeon-style shoulder spikes. The Messer comes in F01 and F02 variants, with the latter featuring leg-mounted thrusters for enhanced ground mobility. The film introduces an original Messer F02 Commander Type, distinguished by a head antenna, leg thrusters, and unique coloring. A "naked" Commander Type variant, with some components removed, also appears.

==== Penelope (ペーネロペー, PENELOPE) ====
The Penelope, the primary antagonist mobile suit and a counterpart to the Xi Gundam, was produced by Anaheim Electronics to combat the Mafty organization. Though slightly less advanced than the Xi Gundam, it boasts a superior beam barrier. Initially designed with an internal Minovsky Flight System, development issues led to the adoption of an external "Big Goose" flight unit, making it the first mobile suit with such a system. The base unit, named "Odysseus Gundam," becomes the 32-meter-tall, 112-ton Penelope when equipped with the flight unit. Its weapons include multi-purpose arm units with missile pods, a beam saber, and a mega particle cannon, along with a handheld beam rifle, a large mega particle cannon, and funnel missiles in its shoulder and skirt armor, controlled via brainwaves.

==== Gustav Karl (グスタフ・カール, GUSTAV KARL) ====
The Gustav Karl, a mainstay of the Earth Federation's Kimberly Unit, is a large mobile suit inheriting the design philosophy of the GM and Jegan lines, emphasizing high performance and heavy armor. Standing 23 meters tall, it appeared in Mobile Suit Gundam Unicorn and is primarily used by security forces for policing operations. Its standard armaments include a beam rifle, a beam saber, a grenade launcher on its left arm, and a defensive shield.

=== Other featured machines ===
In the opening hijacking sequence, the novel features hijackers using a "Base Jabber" flight support vehicle to board the Haunzen flight. In the film, this is replaced with the Gaplant (ORX-005), a high-altitude mobile armor from Mobile Suit Zeta Gundam (1985). Additionally, the film features a ground-combat Jegan A-Type "Man Hunter" variant with black feet and waist-mounted anti-personnel weapons.

=== Screen ===
In the mobile suit battle sequences, a hybrid approach combining hand-drawn animation and 3DCG at the same resolution was employed. The close-combat scene between the Messer and Gustav Karl during the Davao air raid was executed using this method. Seiichi Nakatani, responsible for the Xi Gundam and Penelope battle scenes, primarily utilized 3D rendering. At the suggestion of director Shuko Murase, all beam shots were completed in a 3D environment using a technique called "camera mapping", which converts 2D image assets into visuals with 3D depth and motion, while backgrounds were rendered realistically. 3DCG director Takayuki Masuo noted that camera mapping was used for scenes inside the Haunzen shuttle cabin and when Hathaway transitions from a yacht to an airplane, achieving a stereoscopic effect while reducing workload. However, for the scene of Hathaway and others traveling in a luxury car through an underground tunnel, normal mapping was used to depict the effects of varying lighting conditions. To enhance realism, YAMATOWORKS, led by Shupei Morita, created a CG model of Earth spanning 40,000 kilometers, designed with altitude and speed considerations. Animator Eiwa Hara noted that, per Murase's direction, the visuals were kept dark, while Kenta Wakabayashi mentioned brightening the composite by two levels for review. Hara also revealed that the spark effects when Gustav Karl strikes Messer in the latter half of the film were initially designed as particle splashes but were finalized, after consultation with Nobuhiko Genma and effects animation supervisor Shuichi Kaneko, to resemble Chinese fireworks displays.

== Music ==
=== Sound effects ===
The film utilized Dolby Atmos technology to create immersive audio effects. This technology allowed audiences to experience a sense of sound pressure from above during theater screenings. Notably, during the chaotic scenes of Hathaway and Gigi escaping after Mafty's hotel attack, the environmental impact of mobile suit battles was vividly reproduced through three-dimensional audio. In the scene where Hathaway receives the Gundam at high altitude, the creators emphasized heavy breathing and loud alarms inside the helmet to heighten audience tension. Producer Naohiro Ogata stated that the film's theatrical experience rivals watching Christopher Nolan's works in IMAX, noting that the director was likely inspired by Nolan's films and the James Bond series. Sound designer Koji Kasamatsu, who previously worked on the sound design for the film version of Turn A Gundam and Hayao Miyazaki's The Wind Rises, stated that the film's sound design aimed for a "high level of immersion" in both visuals and audio. Influenced by Hollywood sound design, the film's audio was crafted to modernize the sound of the Mobile Suit Gundam series. With Murase aiming for top-tier visuals, the sound effects were meticulously selected, with beam sounds differing from previous Gundam works.

=== Theme song ===
At the online press conference on March 24, 2020, it was announced that the film's theme song, Senkou (閃光, Flash), was created by the Japanese rock band Alexandros. The band stated that the song was composed after reading the original novel. The single was released on May 5, 2021, in three editions: regular, first press limited, and complete production limited. The first press limited edition included a DVD or Blu-ray Disc with the song's music video, live recording footage, and a performance at Shimokitazawa SHELTER, while the complete production limited edition included a custom-colored HG RX-78-2 Gundam model. The complete production limited edition's cover featured an image of the Xi Gundam from the film. Unlike the theatrical release, the Netflix streaming version used an English-language ending song to align with global market strategies.

=== Soundtrack ===
The film's music was composed by Hiroyuki Sawano, a frequent contributor to the Gundam series. In the third installment of Hathaway's Report – Guide to Hathaway's Flash, Sawano revealed that composition began in mid-2019, with recording starting in early 2020. As producer Naohiro Ogata aimed for a more adult-oriented audience, Sawano leaned toward a Hollywood-style approach, emphasizing sound effects over melody, though traces of Mobile Suit Gundam Unicorn's style remained in the main theme. The program showcased behind-the-scenes recording footage for the tracks "EARth," "83UeI", (Note: Read as "Hathaway.") and "MNE", (Note: An acronym for "Mafty Navue Erin.") highlighting Sawano's unique naming style to focus attention on the music itself. On June 16, 2021, the soundtrack debuted at #8 on the Billboard JAPAN weekly download album chart.

Sawano composed two vocal tracks, "Möbius" for the opening animation and "TRACER" as an insert song. The music video for "Möbius" was released before the film's premiere, while "TRACER"'s video, featuring the Davao night raid scene, was posted on the official Gundam Channel on YouTube after the release. Murase noted that the sequence from the dance scene to Messer's deployment, piloted by Gawman, was originally set to different tracks but ultimately used the high-energy portion of "TRACER" as background music.

== Promotion ==
=== UC NexT 0100 Project ===
The film was first announced as part of Sunrise's "UC NexT 0100" project for new works. On April 20, 2018, Bandai held a press conference in Japan, unveiling the "UC NexT 0100" plan to expand the Universal Century storyline. The first announced work was Mobile Suit Gundam Narrative, a sequel to Mobile Suit Gundam Unicorn, with Mobile Suit Gundam: Hathaway's Flash listed in the project roadmap. A teaser for the film was included in the Blu-ray special features of Mobile Suit Gundam Narrative, confirming it as the second work in the "UC NexT 0100" project. At the Gundam 40th anniversary event, it was announced that the film would be a trilogy.

On January 10, 2019, a teaser trailer showed Hathaway walking alone on a beach, shaking sand from his shoes, followed by a voiceover saying, "Have you heard the name 'Nejen'? If so, I can take you there," after which Hathaway stands up. "Nejen" was confirmed as the name of Mafty's support ship in the novel. Subsequent scenes showed the Penelope, the main antagonistic mobile suit, flying away. The trailer highlighted a refined animation style, with character designs leaning toward the realistic aesthetic of Mobile Suit Gundam Unicorn compared to the novel. The creative team, including director Shuko Murase, character designers pablo uchida and Naoyuki Onda, and composer Hiroyuki Sawano, was also revealed, along with a planned winter 2020 release.

=== Gundam Fan Gathering ===
On New Year's Day 2020, a new teaser trailer was released, and a fan event, "Gundam Fan Gathering – 'Hathaway's Flash' Heirs to Gundam," was announced for March 24 at Zepp DiverCity in Tokyo to reveal the main voice cast and confirm the film's release date as July 23, 2020. The one-minute trailer, accompanied by Hiroyuki Sawano's score and narrated by Ken Narita, who voices Hathaway's father Bright Noa, briefly recapped Mobile Suit Gundam: Char's Counterattack and positioned the film as its sequel. Key characters like Gigi Andalusia and Kenneth Sleg appeared in the trailer. Updated key visuals were released before the event, showing Hathaway at the center, flanked by Char on his left and Amuro on his right, with text describing him as inheriting the ideals of Char and the passion of Amuro. Due to the COVID-19 pandemic, the March 24 fan gathering was converted to an online press conference. The online event announced that Kensho Ono replaced Nozomu Sasaki as Hathaway Noa, with Reina Ueda voicing Gigi Andalusia, and Junichi Suwabe voicing Kenneth Sleg. Voice actors Toru Furuya (Amuro) and Shuichi Ikeda (Char) attended, reenacting classic lines and sharing thoughts on the new Gundam sequel, expressing admiration for the continuation of the Universal Century timeline. The event concluded with the announcement that Alexandros would produce the theme song. A new movie poster was released, depicting Hathaway at an attack site with a panicked crowd fleeing, though fans criticized it for resembling a model kit designed with material-saving "undergating" techniques. (Note: "Undergating" refers to a injection molding technique where material is removed from unseen parts of a model to save production costs.) Character designer pablo uchida publicly apologized online for the oversight. Regarding the replacement of Nozomu Sasaki, who long voiced Hathaway, Kensho Ono expressed respect for his predecessor on Twitter, earning fan support.

=== Gundam China Project ===
In July 2020, Bandai Namco, the rights holder, announced the "Gundam China Project" during the "Gundam G Conference 2020". The project included plans to release the Mobile Suit Gundam: Hathaway's Flash film trilogy in Mainland China theaters simultaneously with Japan. However, after a 15-minute preview of the film was released, concerns arose about its potential import due to its realistic visuals and sensitive plot. On May 18, 2021, the organizers of the 24th Shanghai International Film Festival, scheduled for June 11 to 20, announced a lineup including eight Gundam series films. Alongside the Mobile Suit Gundam theatrical trilogy, the Mobile Suit Zeta Gundam theatrical trilogy, and Mobile Suit Gundam: Char's Counterattack, Hathaway's Flash was confirmed for an official screening in Mainland China.

During a special GUNPLA EXPO event on November 11, 2020, the official release date for the film was updated to May 7, 2021. To accompany this announcement, a new promotional visual featuring the Xi Gundam was released. In this visual, the white Xi Gundam descends from the sky at dawn with its arms spread wide. Additionally, an updated teaser trailer with edited footage was released, showcasing a confrontation between the Penelope and Xi Gundam. The official announcement also included news of the commercialization of the Xi Gundam as an HGUC model.

=== Road to U.C. 0105 ===
On New Year's Day 2021, the official YouTube channel for the Mobile Suit Gundam series, GUNDAM Channel, launched a campaign called "Road to U.C. 0105" to reach 1.05 million subscribers. The campaign tied subscriber milestones to the years of Universal Century works, with corresponding films or OVAs made available for 24 hours when the subscriber count reached ten thousand times the year of a work's setting. As subscriber goals were met, the Mobile Suit Gundam theatrical trilogy, Mobile Suit Gundam 0080: War in the Pocket, Mobile Suit Gundam 0083: Stardust Memory, and the Mobile Suit Zeta Gundam theatrical trilogy were sequentially uploaded. By April 16, 2021, the channel had reached 991,000 subscribers. After hitting 930,000 subscribers, GUNDAM Channel streamed Mobile Suit Gundam: Char's Counterattack for free on April 17 at 9:00 p.m. (Japan Standard Time), attracting over 110,000 simultaneous viewers on the first day. Following this, the channel unexpectedly released the first 15 minutes and 53 seconds of Hathaway's Flash Part A for free as a surprise.

=== First official trailer ===
On January 19, 2021, the production team released the first official trailer for the film on the official YouTube channel. This trailer, lasting less than a minute, begins with Hathaway's self-introduction, interspersed with a statement from "Mafty" declaring attacks to urge the Federation government to reflect, while the Messer F01, Mafty's primary mobile suit, appears in flight mode. The trailer continues with Hathaway tearfully expressing his struggle to change the status quo, followed by the introduction of Federation Colonel Kenneth Sleg, who is pursuing Mafty, and the mysterious girl Gigi Andalusia. Under the subtitle "Destruction or Salvation", Hathaway's voice resolves to take action to change the status quo. Overall, the trailer highlights Hathaway's role as the leader of Mafty, poised to battle the Earth Federation. On the same day, the official website updated the cast information, announcing Soma Saito as the voice actor for the character Lane Aim.

On February 17, 2021, an additional trailer was released for Shochiku Multiplex Theatres. This trailer featured the main trio of characters alongside the Xi Gundam, specially developed for the Mafty organization by the Universal Century arms manufacturer Anaheim Electronics. The Penelope, shown in close-up, exhibited a near-hand-drawn style. Concurrently, a talk show hosted by Kensho Ono, who voices Hathaway, titled Hathaway's Report – Guide to Hathaway's Flash, featuring the film's producer and voice actors as guests, began airing on the GUNDAM Channel on YouTube starting February 21.

=== Second official trailer ===
On March 26, 2021, the production team released the second official trailer for the film, along with updated main and mecha visuals. The new main visual depicted Hathaway, hardened by his experiences in the Second Neo Zeon War instigated by Char, with a resolute gaze, alongside the enigmatic Gigi, a stern Kenneth holding a riding crop, Lane as a new Federation mobile suit pilot, and the Xi Gundam. The background featured a scene of Gigi and Hathaway embracing. The mecha visual showcased the Xi Gundam descending from the pre-dawn sky with arms outstretched. Both visuals were accompanied by the tagline, "A Dazzling Flash, the Dawn of a New World". In mid-February, the official announcement revealed the voice cast for eight additional characters, including Kenyu Horiuchi, Yui Ishikawa, and Kōichi Yamadera. The second trailer featured mobile suits rendered in a CG style, departing from the hand-drawn style of earlier trailers. The trailer opens with Hathaway in a pilot suit inside a cockpit, accompanied by Kenneth, voiced by Junichi Suwabe, describing Mafty as a "dangerous figure". It depicts Hathaway, voiced by Kensho Ono, fighting for people's hopes, while Amuro Ray, Hathaway's predecessor, appears at the trailer's end with a background monologue stating, "Death won't come when you're prepared" coinciding with the credits. Notably, Amuro Ray does not appear directly in the original novel. The trailer also reanimated scenes from Mobile Suit Gundam: Char's Counterattack in flashback form. In this segment, Quess Paraya jumps from a car driven by Hathaway, who tries but fails to stop her, marking their parting during the Second Neo Zeon War. Additionally, the trailer featured cockpit footage of mobile suits and Hathaway piloting the Xi Gundam in an aerial battle against Lane Aim's Penelope, with the theme song Senkō by Alexandros making its debut. The first part of the trilogy was screened in 214 theaters in Japan, including 4D and Dolby Cinema venues, setting a record for the highest number of theaters for a Gundam series premiere in Japan. This number later increased to 215 theaters.

To build anticipation for Hathaway's Flash, Mobile Suit Gundam: Char's Counterattack was remastered in Dolby Cinema format and re-released in select Japanese theaters on April 2, 2021. The first 15 minutes and 53 seconds of Hathaway's Flash, featuring the meeting of Hathaway, Gigi, and Kenneth aboard Haunzen Flight 356, were screened in theaters immediately following the re-release.

=== Completion Report Event ===
On April 13, 2021, the production team held a completion report event and news conference at Zepp DiverCity in Tokyo. During the event, key staff members took the stage to share their thoughts on the film's completion. The band Alexandros also performed the film's theme song, Senkō, live at the event.

=== Opening 15-minute 53-second segment ===
On April 17, 2021, the production team released the first 15 minutes and 53 seconds of the film's Part A for free online. This segment depicts the hijacking of Haunzen Flight 356, a special flight carrying Earth Federation government officials, including the mysterious girl Gigi Andalusia, en route to Earth. As the hijackers aim their guns at Hathaway, the voice of Quess Paraya, who died at Axis, echoes in his mind. When Gigi Andalusia utters words reminiscent of Quess, Hathaway rises to confront the hijackers. The segment concludes with Hathaway and Federation Colonel Kenneth Sleg teaming up to subdue the hijackers, who claim to be part of Mafty. Within these 15 minutes, the segment encapsulates the backgrounds of the three main characters, a detailed portrayal of Haunzen Flight 356, and the era's central topic, "Mafty". Although no mobile suit battles appear in this segment, it features familiar mobile suits for Gundam fans, including the Gaplant, originally introduced in Mobile Suit Zeta Gundam. On May 7, 2021, the production team released an extended segment on the official YouTube channel, including the opening theme, building on the previous 15-minute clip, and announced that the initial segment had reached 2.2 million views. This extended segment included iconic scenes from Mobile Suit Gundam: Char's Counterattack. Additionally, the music video for the opening theme, "Möbius", composed by Hiroyuki Sawano, was released. The song was performed by artists such as Laco, mpi, and Benjamin, who had previously collaborated with Sawano. The music video featured multiple screens on stage, showcasing tense scenes from the film and elements consistent with the worldview of previous Gundam series.

=== Television commercials ===
Starting April 24, 2021, the production team aired two 15-second television commercials to promote the film. The content of these commercials largely overlapped with previously released trailers. The first commercial, focused on the plot, highlighted the appearances of Hathaway, Gigi, and Kenneth, incorporating the theme song Senkō in the latter half and concluding with a scene of Hathaway and Gigi embracing. The second commercial, centered on mobile suits, emphasized the tense expressions of Hathaway and Lane piloting the Xi Gundam and Penelope, respectively, culminating in a dramatic scene of mobile suits battling in Earth's gravity. Additionally, the production team invited Mitsuhiro Oikawa, a known Gundam series enthusiast, to appear in a newly released television commercial. After the film's release, a Mafty members' version of the commercial was released, featuring key Mafty members alongside mobile suit battle scenes and the main characters.

=== Theatergoer gifts ===
The distributor prepared various limited-edition gifts for theatergoers. The second week's gift, distributed over a five-week period, consisted of film strips from past Gundam theatrical releases, specifically from the Mobile Suit Zeta Gundam series and Mobile Suit Gundam: Char's Counterattack.

== Theatrical release ==
=== Japan ===
The film was initially scheduled for release on July 23, 2020, as announced on December 31, 2019. However, on June 4, 2020, the production team announced a postponement due to the COVID-19 pandemic. As the COVID-19 situation in Japan worsened, the team announced another delay on April 26, 2021, rescheduling the release for May 21, 2021. The premiere events planned for May 7–9, along with the sale of limited-edition Blu-rays and Gundam models, were canceled or postponed. This sparked humorous reactions on social media, with fans creating memes using quotes from previous Gundam works. The standard CD release of the theme song Senkō remained on schedule for May 5, 2021, while the limited-edition version, bundled with a specially colored model, was postponed to May 21, 2021, as it was tied to theater sales. On May 17, 2021, five days before the scheduled release, the production team announced another postponement due to Japan's extended state of emergency, marking the third delay, with no new release date specified. Limited-edition merchandise planned for the premiere was also delayed. On June 1, 2021, the production team, under the name of the in-universe anti-government organization "Mafty" led by the protagonist, announced the film would be released on June 11, 2021, in Japan. The limited-edition Blu-ray and theater-exclusive merchandise were also rescheduled for June 11. Ultimately, the film premiered in 215 theaters across Japan on June 11, 2021. Following the release of the 4K Ultra HD Blu-ray, the film was re-screened for a limited time in 84 Japanese theaters on December 2, 2021.

In November 2022, to commemorate the introduction of a Dolby Cinema system at the "Shinjuku Wald 9" theater in Tokyo's Shinjuku district, the film was screened alongside Demon Slayer: Kimetsu no Yaiba – The Movie: Mugen Train, Akira, and other films from November 28 to December 2. As part of the December "Gundam Festival", WOWOW broadcast several Gundam series works, including this film, from December 18 to 20, 2022.

=== International screenings ===
The film was showcased alongside other Japanese films at the 24th Shanghai International Film Festival, held in Shanghai from June 11 to 20, 2021. Due to its immense popularity, tickets for the film were resold on the second-hand market for over ¥1,800 (CNY). With the official release of the film in Japan, online video provider Netflix also announced that it will launch the film on its website on July 1, 2021, supporting dubbing in 8 languages and subtitles in more than 30 languages. One day after its Netflix release, Chinese streaming platform Bilibili announced that the film would be available on its site starting July 2, 2021, simultaneously launching on Youku and Xigua Video. The Bilibili version, compared to the Blu-ray and Netflix versions, removed sensitive and nude scenes. At the same time, the film was also made available on Youku. On October 16, 2021, the film was released on Amazon Prime Video.

In Australia, the film received a limited theatrical release through Sugoi Co in the lead up to The Sorcery of Nymph Circe's release on May 9-10, 2026.

=== Television broadcast ===
Following the revival of the "Sunday 5" programming block by MBS and TBS with the airing of Mobile Suit Gundam: The Witch from Mercury, this film was broadcast as part of the "GUNDAM NEXT FUTURE×Sunday 5" initiative. As the first installment featuring Universal Century works, it aired in a four-episode television format starting in January 2023, alongside Mobile Suit Gundam Thunderbolt and Mobile Suit Gundam Narrative during the break between the first and second seasons of The Witch from Mercury. The television edition ranked first in the anime charts during the third week of January 2023. It maintained the top position for two consecutive weeks by the second week of February 2023.

No.	Japanese title	English title	Original airdate
1	1 / 4「ランディング・グラウンド」	Landing Ground	January 15, 2023
Twelve years after the upheaval caused by Char, the Earth Federation government grew increasingly corrupt and implemented a policy to forcibly relocate residents to space. To combat the Federation's tyranny, the anti-government organization "Mafty" initiated a series of assassinations targeting senior officials. Hathaway, the group's leader and son of Bright, encountered a hijacking incident while traveling to Earth. During this event, he met the enigmatic girl Gigi and Federation Colonel Kenneth.
2	2 / 4「コンタクト」	Contact	January 22, 2023
e years after the upheaval caused by Char, the Earth Federation government grew increasingly corrupt and implemented a policy to forcibly relocate residents to space. To combat the Federation's tyranny, the anti-government organization "Mafty" initiated a series of assassinations targeting senior officials. Hathaway, the group's leader and son of Bright, encountered a hijacking incident while traveling to Earth. During this event, he met the enigmatic girl Gigi and Federation Colonel Kenneth.
3	3 / 4「ランナウェイ」	Runaway	January 29, 2023
Kenneth names his anti-Mafty task force the "Circe Unit" after the daughter of the sun god Helios and publicly declares his affection for Gigi, viewing her as a goddess of luck. Subsequently, Hathaway escapes Davao and reaches Mafty's hidden base at Rodah Sayed. Around the same time, Kenneth deduces from his conversations with Gigi that Hathaway is Mafty.
4	4 / 4「テイク・オフ」	Take Off	February 5, 2023
To receive the Ξ Gundam, secretly built by Anaheim on the Moon and launched toward Earth, Hathaway initiates an aerial interception operation. Meanwhile, Kenneth orders Lane Aim, piloting the Federation's Penelope mobile suit, to intercept the descending Ξ Gundam while carrying Mafty member Gawman Nobil as a captive. A battle then ensues between Hathaway and Lane.

== Collaborations ==
=== GUNPLA ===
Following the announcement of the novel's film adaptation, parent company Bandai Co., Ltd. unveiled the first Gunpla model tied to the film's release at the 2019 Shizuoka Hobby Show. This was a 1/144 scale Penelope from the HGUC series. Due to its design, this model is notably large, approximately 20 cm tall, surpassing the size and price of typical MG series products. It was officially released in October of that year. In early 2020, Bandai announced the commercialization of the Messer F01, Mafty's primary mobile suit in the film, in the same HGUC series. This model featured a sliding mechanism in the torso and joints, allowing for dynamic poses, and was released on July 4, 2020. At the 2021 "Gunpla Expo", Bandai announced the upcoming release of a 1/144 scale HGUC Ξ Gundam, along with a set including both the Ξ Gundam and Penelope with Minovsky Craft effect parts. In late May 2021, the HG Messer F02 Commander Type was released by BANDAI SPIRITS on June 11.

At the April 2021 film completion press conference, the production team announced a limited-edition HGUC Penelope to commemorate the theatrical release, available exclusively at theaters and official stores. This model used colored translucent parts, with packaging featuring a poster by character designer pablo uchida, but was otherwise identical to the standard version. The original Messer F02 Commander Type, featured in the film, was scheduled for release in November 2021, allowing conversion to the standard Messer F Type Commander model by removing or replacing components.

=== Other Bandai brands ===
Bandai's NXEDGE STYLE brand released merchandise based on mobile suits from *Mobile Suit Gundam: Hathaway's Flash*, including the Ξ Gundam and Penelope. These products feature electroplated metal parts, with the Penelope able to transform into the Odysseus Gundam by removing its flight unit. Additionally, Bandai's ROBOT Soul brand planned a September 2021 release for a posable Penelope figure. The fashion brand STRICT-G, which integrates the Gundam series with stylish items, launched collaborative merchandise on the film's release date, including jackets, T-shirts, and hats featuring elements from the movie. On August 7, 2021, STRICT-G also began selling items inspired by the film's Tasaday Hotel, including card cases, T-shirts, and bath towels with hotel branding.

=== Collaborations with other brands ===
To commemorate the film's release, personal computer brand ASUS launched Gundam-themed desktop PC products in Japan, including a white model inspired by the RX-78-2 Gundam and a red model based on Char's mobile suit. Due to shared voice actors and character connections between the Gundam series and Case Closed, a collaborative promotional video was released shortly after the film's premiere with the concurrently screening Case Closed: The Scarlet Bullet. The video featured narration by Tōru Furuya and Shūichi Ikeda, who voice Amuro Ray in Gundam and Anraku Trans in Case Closed, and Char Aznable in Gundam and Shūichi Akai in Case Closed, respectively. Additionally, a Shūichi Akai-colored HG Zaku II and a Char-red EG series Conan Edogawa were released. This cross-IP promotion sparked discussions, described as "the most confusing collaboration ever", "a luxurious voice actor collaboration", and "giving goosebumps".

In May 2022, Japanese cosplay brand COSPA announced a collaborative merchandise T-shirt series featuring iconic lines and the signature pumpkin mask from the film.

== Media releases and sales ==
On April 18, 2021, Bandai Namco announced that a theater-limited Blu-ray edition of the film would be released on May 7, 2021, coinciding with its theatrical premiere. This edition included special features such as a new paperback edition of the first volume of the original novel, six CDs of an audiobook for the first volume totaling 407 minutes narrated by Nozomu Sasaki, who voiced Hathaway Noa in Mobile Suit Gundam: Char's Counterattack, a soundtrack CD composed by Hiroyuki Sawano, and footage from the "GUNDAM FAN GATHERING" event held on March 24, 2020. The Blu-ray included subtitles in multiple languages, including Chinese Traditional and Simplified. Within five days of its release alongside the film, the Blu-ray sold over 50,000 copies. By July 5, 24 days after release, the limited and standard editions sold 52,989 and 37,964 copies, respectively, totaling over 90,000 copies, approaching the total sales of 94,000 for Mobile Suit Gundam Narrative.

In addition to the Blu-ray released with the film, a 4K Ultra HD Blu-ray edition and a special limited Blu-ray edition, including event footage and a soundtrack CD, were released on November 26, 2021.

== Reception and Impact ==
=== Pre-release ===
The original novel's author, Yoshiyuki Tomino, expressed that the themes of the novel remained relevant 30 years later and was delighted that the production team decided to adapt it into a trilogy of films. After the announcement at an online event in March 2020 that the lead role of Hathaway Noa would be voiced by Kensho Ono instead of Nozomu Sasaki, fans of the Gundam series sparked heated discussions online, with both supportive and opposing opinions. Sasaki himself shared complex feelings about the recasting on Twitter, further fueling the debate. Ono, who took over the role, commented at the production completion event that the film portrays mobile suit battles from a unique perspective, evoking the terror of such conflicts in a realistic world. Fans who watched the trailer expressed excitement, describing the cockpit scenes as "cool", voicing high anticipation, and noting similarities to Megumi Hayashibara's voice for Gigi in previous works. (Note: Megumi Hayashibara once voiced Gigi Andalucia, in the Playstation video game SD Gundam G Generation-F.) Additional reactions included comments like "really looking forward to it" and "it sounds like Megumi Hayashibara's voice". Forbes writer Ollie Barder, after viewing the trailer, noted that Yasuhiro Moriki's complex mechanical designs posed significant challenges for animation, but the trailer's visuals were impressive, reflecting the director's ambition. Junichi Suwabe, who viewed the full film before its release, praised it highly. On April 18, 2021, the production team released the first 15 minutes and 53 seconds of the film on their official YouTube channel, generating significant buzz with over 1,000 comments in half a day. Reviews praised the film's high-quality visuals, detailed animation, and the inclusion of mobile suits from previous works. Some critiques contrasted the film with Mobile Suit Gundam Unicorn, expressing dissatisfaction with the latter. Others noted that Hathaway's hallucination of Quess's voice reinforced the film's status as a direct sequel to Char's Counterattack. At a media promotional event on April 27, 2021, Gundam fan and actor Mitsuhiro Oikawa praised the film, particularly its realistic CG-rendered street battle scenes. Toru Furuya, who reprised his role as Amuro Ray, also commended the detailed backgrounds and the sense of scale in the mobile suit depictions.

=== Post-release ===
Upon release, the film received widespread acclaim from audiences in Japan and internationally. Online reviews praised its "high production quality, stunning visuals, and mature storytelling", with comments like "surpassing 10 billion yen in box office isn't a dream" and "the most Gundam-like Gundam work". On the Chinese review platform Douban, the film initially scored 9.0, topping the weekly reputation chart for three weeks. Two months later, the score settled at 8.6. On Bilibili, it achieved a 9.8 rating and ranked among the top five in the 2021 editorial funding list. Four weeks after release, Rotten Tomatoes reported a 93% audience approval rating, while IMDb gave it a 7/10. On Bangumi, the film scored 8.3, earning a "highly recommended" rating. Reviews highlighted the high production quality of characters and mecha, praising the blend of CG and hand-drawn animation, detailed backgrounds, and realistic scene portrayals. Criticisms included compressed character development and plot structure compared to the novel, and overly dark battle scenes that obscured mobile suit details. Anime News Network's Richard Eisenbeis gave the film a B, noting its "beautiful texture" but criticizing creative choices that limited its fidelity to the source material. Panos Kotzathanasis of Asian Movie Pulse praised it as one of the best recent Gundam films in terms of story, characters, and action. Regarding box office performance, an industry insider noted that achieving 1.6 billion yen during the pandemic with only around 200 theaters in Japan was remarkable, with repeat viewers contributing significantly due to the limited theater count. The film's depiction of a futuristic Philippines, including Davao City and Jollibee, sparked significant social media buzz.

Hiroshi Okajima, a professor at Chuo University's Faculty of Global Informatics, highly praised Reina Ueda's performance as Gigi Andalusia.

=== Meme culture ===
The film's hijacker leader, posing as Mafty and wearing a distinctive pumpkin mask, was linked by netizens to a pre-existing viral video of a pumpkin-masked dancer. Paired with the film's theme song Senko by Alexandros, this created the "Mafty Passionate Speech" meme, which gained widespread popularity on Bilibili and Niconico.

=== Nominations and awards ===
Awards and nominations for Mobile Suit Gundam: Hathaway's Flash
Year	Award	Category	Nominee	Result	Ref.
2021	8th Anime Trending Awards	Anime Movie of the Year	Mobile Suit Gundam: Hathaway's Flash	Nominated	
2021	Gadget Tsūshin Anime Buzzword Awards 2021	Anime Buzzword Award	Mafty Meme ("Do it, Mafty!" "It should work out somehow!" "It's a Gundam!?")	Gold	
2021	Gadget Tsūshin Anime Buzzword Awards 2021	Anime Buzzword Award	Pumpkin Dance	Bronze	

== Box office ==
The film premiered in Japan on June 11, 2021, earning ¥190 million on its opening day, 3.37 times the opening day revenue of Mobile Suit Gundam Narrative (2018). Upon hearing this, executive producer Naohiro Ogata stated that the film's goal was to surpass the ¥2.3 billion record set by Mobile Suit Gundam III: Encounters in Space (1982), aiming to become the highest-grossing film in the Gundam franchise. Three days after its release, the film grossed ¥523 million in Japan, with a total of 259,000 admissions. The opening weekend earned ¥330 million, topping the weekend box office chart. By the third week, weekend box office revenue dropped to ¥162 million, ranking fifth. Due to new releases like Godzilla vs. Kong, the film slipped to seventh in admissions by its fifth week. By July 11, in its fifth week, it further dropped to ninth.

In terms of weekly attendance, the film ranked fourth in its opening week. It also led with an average per-screen revenue of ¥1.5379 million. In the Japanese box office, it ranked third overall in its opening week, behind Evangelion: 3.0+1.0 Thrice Upon a Time, which had been in theaters for over three months, and the live-action adaptation of Rurouni Kenshin: The Beginning. According to Movie.com, the film's comprehensive search ranking jumped from 64th the previous week to sixth in its opening week. During its second weekend (June 19–20), the film dropped to fourth in box office rankings. By the third week, attendance rankings slipped to fifth. By July 4, after four weeks, the film had accumulated 779,000 admissions in Japan. After 38 days, this number rose to 910,000. By August 2, after 52 days, admissions reached 990,000. By September 10, cumulative admissions exceeded 1 million, reaching 1.07 million. By early October, total admissions reached 1.08 million.

On June 21, 2021, the production team announced that as of 1:30 p.m. (Tokyo time) on June 20, the film's cumulative box office had reached ¥1.016 billion, with over 500,000 admissions. This marked the first time a Gundam film had crossed the ¥1 billion mark since Mobile Suit Gundam: Char's Counterattack in 1988, achieved in just 10 days. By June 27, the cumulative box office reached ¥1.35 billion. By the end of the fourth week on July 4, the film had grossed ¥1.58 billion across 215 theaters in Japan, surpassing the total box office of Char's Counterattack. By July 19, after 38 days, the cumulative box office reached ¥1.8 billion. By August 2, in its eighth week, it exceeded ¥2 billion, closing in on the franchise's highest-grossing film, Mobile Suit Gundam III: Encounters in Space. By September 10, the box office reached ¥2.17 billion, and by early October, it hit ¥2.18 billion. After 129 days, the film achieved ¥2.2 billion, just ¥100 million shy of the franchise's record. Ultimately, the film's 2021 domestic box office in Japan totaled ¥2.23 billion, ranking 14th among Japanese films for the year.

== Sequels ==
During the final production staff interview on September 2, 2021, producer Naohiro Ogata, alongside voice actor Ken Narita, who voices Bright Noa in the sequel, announced the tentative subtitle for the second part, Sun of Bright. During a commemorative event following the film's release, Ogata mentioned that the production team had conducted location scouting in the Philippines for the first part. As the second part is set in Australia, the ongoing COVID-19 pandemic made similar on-site scouting challenging, so the team planned to rely on resources from platforms like Google and hoped for assistance from locals at the filming locations.

On June 26, 2025, the official announcement confirmed that the second part of the trilogy, subtitled The Sorcery of Nymph Circe (キルケーの魔女), was in full production. It released on January 30, 2026.

== Notes ==
Preceded by SD Gundam World Sangoku Soketsuden	Gundam (by release year); 2021–ongoing	Succeeded by Mobile Suit Gundam: Cucuruz Doan's Island
Preceded by Mobile Suit Gundam Narrative	Universal Century; U.C. 0105	Succeeded by Mobile Suit Gundam F91
