= Mobile Suit Gundam: Hathaway's Flash =

Japanese light novel series

- First light novel volume cover

機動戦士ガンダム 閃光のハサウェイ (Kidō Senshi Gandamu: Senkō no Hasauei)
- Genre: Mecha; Military science fiction; Tragedy
- Created by: Hajime Yatate; Yoshiyuki Tomino
- Light novel
- Written by: Yoshiyuki Tomino
- Illustrated by: Haruhiko Mikimoto
- Published by: Kadokawa Shoten
- Imprint: Kadokawa Sneaker Bunko
- Original run: February 13, 1989 – April 11, 1990
- Volumes: 3
- Manga
- Written by: Sabishi Uroaki
- Published by: Kadokawa Shoten
- Magazine: Gundam Ace
- Original run: March 26, 2020 – present
- Volumes: 4
- Anime film series

Mobile Suit Gundam: Hathaway
- Directed by: Shūkō Murase
- Produced by: Hiroyuki Kikukawa; Toshikazu Naka
- Written by: Yasuyuki Muto
- Music by: Hiroyuki Sawano
- Studio: Sunrise
- Licensed by: NA: Sunrise Netflix (streaming)
- Released: June 11, 2021 – present
- Films: 2
- icon

Mobile Suit Gundam: Hathaway's Flash (Japanese: 機動戦士ガンダム 閃光のハサウェイ, Hepburn: Kidō Senshi Gandamu Senkō no Hasauei), also known as Mobile Suit Gundam: Hathaway, is a trilogy of Japanese novels written by Yoshiyuki Tomino and published by Kadokawa Shoten under the Kadokawa Sneaker Bunko imprint from February 1989 to April 1990, totaling three volumes. Part of the Gundam media franchise and set in the Universal Century timeline, it follows Hathaway Noa, who assumes the alias Mafty Navue Erin and leads an anti–Earth Federation movement.

A three-part theatrical film adaptation was announced by Sunrise as part of the "UC NexT 0100" project during the franchise's 40th anniversary presentation in November 2018. The first film premiered in Japan on June 11, 2021, and streamed on Netflix beginning July 1. The second film released theatrically in Japan on January 30, 2026.

== Plot ==
In UC 0105, twelve years after the Second Neo Zeon War, (Note: Nine and eight years respectively after the events of Mobile Suit Gundam Unicorn and Mobile Suit Gundam Narrative in the theatrical film adaptation.) the Earth Federation accepts the Republic of Zeon back in the fold. However, the Federation remains corrupt, with politicians, bureaucrats, and corporate executives enjoying their privileges while accelerating the pollution of the planet. And the inhumane "Man Hunter" units that forcibly deport underprivileged or undesirable civilians from around the world to the space colonies are more active than ever before. Mafty, a terrorist organization, begins resisting the Federation with a radical act of assassination of the people of the privileged class. Its leader, Mafty Navue Erin, is actually Hathaway Noa, the son of Bright Noa, a hero of the Federation. Still haunted by the death of Quess Paraya, and reflecting on the actions and beliefs of Char and Amuro, Hathaway uses the new prototype the RX-105 Ξ Gundam (Xi Gundam, "Ksee Gundam") to purge the high officials of the Federation in order to dispel the gloom. In response, Kenneth Sleg of the Earth Federation Space Forces assembles the Circe Unit, led by Lane Aim piloting the RX-104FF Penelope, in order to stop Mafty. Hathaway tries to make his way as a warrior, but an encounter with Kenneth and a mysterious woman, Gigi Andalucia, changes his destiny.

== Characters ==
=== Main characters ===
Hathaway Noa (Mafty Navue Erin) (ハサウェイ・ノア（マフティー・ナビーユ・エリン）, Hasawei Noa (Mafutī Nabīyu Erin))
Voiced by: Nozomu Sasaki (SD Gundam G Generation, Super Robot Wars), Kensho Ono (Film) (Japanese); Caleb Yen (English)
The son of the famous Bright Noa and a veteran pilot when Char tried to crash the Axis into Earth (see Char's Counterattack). However, Hathaway also happens to be Mafty Navue Erin, an infamous anti-Federation terrorist. He came down to Earth with permission to stay for the treatment of depression and training of botanical observer candidates, thanks in part to his father's fame. During the training, he learned about Mafty from an elderly man who visited his supervisor, Professor Amada Mansan, under the alias "Quack Salver", and decides to join the group. As its current leader, he pilots the RX-105 Ξ Gundam.
Gigi Andalucia (ギギ・アンダルシア, Gigi Andarushia)
Voiced by: Megumi Hayashibara (SD Gundam G Generation), Tomoko Kawakami (G Generation Spirits), Reina Ueda (Film) (Japanese); Megan Shipman (English)
A mysterious, eccentric, and wealthy young woman who seemingly has the ability to see through lies.
Kenneth Sleg (ケネス・スレッグ, Kenesu Sureggu)
Voiced by: Fumihiko Tachiki (SD Gundam G Generation), Akio Ōtsuka (Sunrise Eiyutan), Junichi Suwabe (Film) (Japanese); Aaron Phillips (English)
A Federation captain and the chief of security for Davao. He forms the Circe Unit whose sole purpose is to hunt down Mafty.

=== Mafty ===
Iram Masam (イラム・マサム, Iramu Masamu)
Voiced by: Takumi Yamazaki (SD Gundam G Generation), Shunsuke Takeuchi (Film) (Japanese); Stephen Fu (English)
A member of Mafty as part of its technical staff.
Emerelda Zubin (エメラルダ・ズービン, Emeraruda Zūbin)
Voiced by: Rumiko Ukai (SD Gundam G Generation), Yui Ishikawa (Film) (Japanese); Anjali Bhimani (English)
A member of Mafty and one of the group's Mobile Suit pilots.
Gawman Nobil (ガウマン・ノビル, Gauman Nobiru)
Voiced by: Hiroshi Takemura (SD Gundam G Generation), Kenjiro Tsuda (Film) (Japanese); Kevin Dorman (English)
A member of Mafty and one of its pilots.
Fencer Mayne (フェンサー・メイン, Fensā Mein)
Voiced by: Kōhei Amasaki (Japanese); Christopher Bevins (English)
A member of Mafty and one of its pilots.
Golf (ゴルフ, Gorufu)
Voiced by: Hikaru Tanaka (Japanese); Derek Stephen Prince (English)
A member of Mafty and one of its pilots.
Raymond Cain (レイモンド・ケイン, Reimondo Kein)
Voiced by: Takayuki Fujimoto (SD Gundam G Generation), Fukushi Ochiai (Film) (Japanese); Antonio Alvarez (English)
A member of Mafty and one of its pilots.
Civet Anhern (シベット・アンハーン, Shibetto Anhān)
Voiced by: Hideki Tasaka (SD Gundam G Generation), Yu Miyazaki (Film) (Japanese); Zach Aguilar (English)
A member of Mafty and one of its pilots.
Hendrix Hiyo (ヘンドリックス・ハイヨー, Hendorikkusu Haiyō)
Voiced by: Ryūnosuke Watanuki (Japanese); Luis Bermudez (English)
Maximilian Nikolai (マクシミリアン・ニコライ, Makushimirian Nikorai)
Voiced by: Shunpei Kusano (Japanese); Luis Bermudez (English)
Kenji Mitsuda (ミツダ・ケンジ, Mitsuda Kenji)
Voiced by: Chiharu Sawashiro (Japanese); Nik Shriner (English)
Max Harriet (マックス・ハリエット, Makkusu Harietto)
Voiced by: Farahnaz Nikray (Japanese); Rebeka Thomas (English)
A member and mechanic for Mafty.
Mihesssia Hence (ミヘッシャ・ヘンス, Mihessha Hensu)
Voiced by: Misato Matsuoka (Japanese); Jessica DiCicco (English)
A member of Mafty.
Kelia Dace (ケリア・デース, Keria Dēsu)
Voiced by: Saori Hayami (Japanese); Erica Lindbeck (English)
Hathaway's girlfriend. She devoted herself to his rehab and even became Mafty's district supporter to be by his side. However, ironically, as he became a core combatant and immersed himself in Mafty activities, she gradually became estranged.
Quack Salver (クワック・サルヴァー, Kuwakku Saruvā)
An elderly man who goes by the codename "Quack Salver". He is a supporter of Mafty and is the mastermind behind the formation of an anti-Earth Federation organization calling for the purge of the privileged classes and the preservation of the Earth's environment, centered on a fictional figure named Mufti Navue Erin. He provides logistical support to the execution teams led by Hathaway, who continues to carry out terrorist attacks as he moves across the Pacific.
He was once a general in the Earth Front of the Earth Federation Forces. He is now rumored to be a key figure in the Earth Federation government.
A quack-salver is a false name synonymous with a bogus doctor or other fraudulent person.

=== Earth Federation Forces ===
Lane Aim (レーン・エイム, Rēn Eimu)
Voiced by: Kōichi Hashimoto (G Generation F), Takahiro Mizushima (G Generation Spirits onwards), Soma Saito (Film) (Japanese); Kieran Walton (English)
Leader of the Earth Federation's Circe Unit, who pilots the RX-104 Penelope.
Ray Lagoid (レイ・ラゴイド, Rei Ragoido)
Voiced by: Takahiro Sumi (Japanese); Luis Bermudez (English)
Minacce Questarghino (ミネッチェ・ケスタルギーノ, Minecche Kesutarugīno)
Voiced by: Kōsuke Echigoya (Japanese); John Bentley (English)

=== Earth Federation government ===
Hiram Mescher (ハイラム・メッシャー, Hairamu Messhā)
Voiced by: Keishi Kawaguchi
Eyinstein (エインスタイン, Einsutain)
Voiced by: Shūei Ikawa
McGovern (マクガバン, Makugaban)
Voiced by: Eiji Yoshitomi

=== Davao Criminal Police Organization ===
Hundley Yeoksam (ハンドリー・ヨクサン, Handorī Yokusan)
Voiced by: Koichi Yamadera (Japanese); Dave Fennoy (English)
The chief of the Davao Criminal Police Organization.
Geise H. Hugest (ゲイス・H・ヒューゲスト, Geisu H. Hyūgesuto)
Voiced by: Nozomu Sasaki (Japanese); JP Karliak (English)

=== Others ===
Amuro Ray (アムロ・レイ, Amuro Rei)
Voiced by: Tōru Furuya (Japanese); Lucien Dodge (English)
A decorated war veteran and mobile suit pilot of the Second Neo Zeon War, who disappeared in the conflict's final battle fighting Char.
Quess Paraya (クェス・パラヤ, Kuesu Paraya)
Voiced by: Maria Kawamura (Japanese); Anne Yatco (English)
Hathaway's former love interest, who defected to Neo Zeon. She died during the Second Neo Zeon War when Hathaway attempted to confront her to stand down.
Mace Flower (メイス・フラゥワー, Meisu Furauwā)
Voiced by: Atsumi Tanezaki (Japanese); Ryan Bartley (English)
A flight attendant.
Bright Noa (ブライト・ノア, Buraito Noa)
Voiced by: Ken Narita
Hathaway's father and a high-ranking Earth Federation military official working for the Londo Bell task force, whom he has a strained relationship with.
Mirai Noa (née Yashima) (ミライ・ノア, Mirai Noa)
Voiced by: Satomi Arai
Hathaway's mother.

== Media ==
=== Novel ===
Hathaway's Flash was first conceived by Yoshiyuki Tomino in 1988 following the production of Mobile Suit Gundam: Char's Counterattack film. However, Hathaway's Flash is meant more as a sequel to the novel Beltorchika's Children, the second/third novel version of Char's Counterattack. Moriki Yasuhiro provided the mobile suit designs while character illustrator Haruhiko Mikimoto joined the project as character designer.

The three novels of the series were released between February 1989 and April 1990 under the Kadokawa Sneaker Bunko label. The novels were later rereleased by Kadokawa under the Kadokawa Comics Ace Label in 2021.

No.	Title	Date	ISBN
1	Hathaway's Flash (first) Mobile Suit Gundam (閃光のハサウェイ（上） 機動戦士ガンダム)	February 13, 1989	9784044101312
2	Hathaway's Flash (middle) Mobile Suit Gundam (閃光のハサウェイ（中） 機動戦士ガンダム)	March 1, 1990	9784044101329
3	Hathaway's Flash (final) Mobile Suit Gundam (閃光のハサウェイ（下） 機動戦士ガンダム)	April 11, 1990	9784044101336

=== Manga ===
A manga adaptation by Uroaki Sabishi, that serves as a sequel to Uroaki's manga adaptation of Beltorchika's Children, began serialization in Gundam Ace on April 26, 2021, after the prologue was released on March 26, 2020. The series ended its first part on June 26, 2023.

=== Films ===
A three-part film adaptation by Sunrise was first teased back in April 2018 upon the unveiling of Mobile Suit Gundam Narrative. The film was later formally announced during the Gundam 40th Anniversary press conference in November of the same year. The first film was originally scheduled to be released on July 23, 2020, but it was delayed to May 7, 2021, due to the COVID-19 pandemic. The film was delayed again to May 21. A third delay was announced on May 17, with a new date not set at the time. The film was finally released on June 11 in theaters in Japan and China. Netflix obtained streaming rights for the first film, which was released on July 1 in select territories. A four-episode TV version of the film was broadcast on Nippon TV's AnichU programming block from January 6 to 27, 2026.

A second film in the series was teased after the first film's release, but production had stalled due to the pandemic. The film, subtitled as The Sorcery of Nymph Circe (キルケーの魔女, Kirukē no Majo), was released on January 30, 2026, in Japan, on May 15 in the US theaters, and on August 31 on Netflix.

The films are directed by Shūkō Murase, with Yasuyuki Mutou writing screenplays. [Alexandros] performed the first film's main theme "Senkou" (閃光; "Flash"). Yōhei Kawakami and SennaRin performed the second film's insert theme "ENDROLL". The second film's opening theme is "Snooze" by SZA, while the ending is "Sweet Child o' Mine" by Guns N' Roses. Hiroyuki Sawano composed the music for all three films.

Yoshiyuki Tomino stated on an interview, "30 years after I wrote those novels, they are finally being adapted into film. As the author, I am so happy". He also noted that "[t]he real world hasn't progressed, and may even have regressed. Because of all the Gundam fans who gave this story the chance to reemerge, its themes can pierce through society today."

No.	Title	Original release date
1	"Hathaway"; Transliteration: "Senkō no Hasauei" (Japanese: 閃光のハサウェイ)	June 11, 2021
In the year UC 0105, terrorists claiming to be from the group Mafty, who advocate the forced relocation of humanity into space to save the environment, hijack a space plane carrying important Federation officials, but the hijacking is thwarted thanks to the efforts of Hathaway Noa and Kenneth Sleg. During the rescue, Hathaway has his attention drawn to an eccentric passenger on the flight, Gigi Andalucia, who knew the hijackers lied about being part of Mafty. Gigi also appears to show interest in Hathaway. With their flight forced to land in the tropical city of Davao, Hathaway and Gigi end up staying in the same hotel suite while waiting for their next flights. However, Hathaway is alarmed that Gigi seems to have figured out that he is the leader of Mafty. In order to escape Federation surveillance, Hathaway orders his Mafty subordinates to stage a diversionary attack on the city, but the Federation responds much quicker than expected with the Penelope and the resulting battle causes massive collateral damage. Hathaway manages to leave Davao and reach Mafty's secret base. Meanwhile, Kenneth comes to realize Hathaway is part of Mafty, but suspects he's a puppet of a mysterious backer. The Federation locates Mafty's secret base, forcing them to evacuate while Hathaway heads into space in a makeshift rocket to recover the Ξ (Xi) Gundam. With the Ξ Gundam, Hathaway intercepts the Penelope and the Federation forces to buy time for Mafty to escape. Having escaped the Federation for the time being, Hathaway decides to head for the city of Oenbelli to assist anti-Federation forces besieged there.
2	"The Sorcery of Nymph Circe"; Transliteration: "Kirukē no Majo" (Japanese: キルケーの魔女)	January 30, 2026
On the way to Oenbelli, Hathaway struggles with his carnal lust for Gigi and Quess conflicting with his desire to fulfill Mafty's ideals. This causes a rift between him and his girlfriend Kelia, who ultimately leaves him and Mafty. Hathaway leads the attack on Oenbelli, routing the Federation forces and allying with the local anti-Federation resistance group. Meanwhile, Kenneth is ordered by his superiors to leak false information suggesting the Federation is relocating their conference from Adelaide to Guangzhou, preventing him from being able to hunt down Mafty. With the loss of the Oenbelli garrison, the Federation decides to assign Hathaway's father Bright Noa to reinforce Kenneth. Gigi also stays by Kenneth's side in hopes that she will find an opportunity to reunite with Hathaway, and leaks information to him confirming the conference will still be held in Adelaide. Hathaway and Mafty mobilize to attack the conference, but suffer losses en route to their staging point at Ayers Rock. Gigi uses her Newtype abilities to tip off Kenneth that Mafty is hiding there, and she accompanies the attack force he sends which includes Lane temporarily piloting the experimental Alyzeus mobile suit. Hathaway mobilizes in the Ξ Gundam to cover Mafty's escape and manages to defeat Lane. Gigi offers herself up as a hostage in return for Hathaway sparing Lane's life, and she and Hathaway leave the battlefield together after sharing a kiss. Meanwhile, Kenneth arrives in Adelaide and prepares for Mafty's arrival.

=== Video games ===
Hathaway's Flash first appeared in the SD Gundam G Generation series of games by Bandai starting with SD Gundam G Generation F. The series later made its Super Robot Wars debut in Super Robot Wars V in 2017.

=== Merchandise ===
The eponymous character's mecha (Ξ Gundam) was released as part of Bandai's Gundam Fix Figuration line of toys starting in 2005. The title later got its own Gunpla debut, with the BB Seishi No.386 Ξ Gundam in December 2013, the High Grade Universal Century Gustav Karl in February 2019, which were released under the Gundam Unicorn line, the High Grade Universal Century Penelope, released in November 2019, the High Grade Universal Century Messer Type F01, released in July 2020 and the High Grade Universal Century Ξ Gundam, released in April 2021.

== Reception ==
Richard Eisenbeis of Anime News Network gave the first film a B, citing the film's "beautiful but hampered by some of its creative choices" and criticizing its overall plot saying that "with a bit more finesse in execution, it could have been a far better adaptation than what it has turned out to be." In its first theatrical release, the first film earned more than 524 million yen in its first weekend. It later earned 1,016,249,400 yen, making it the first Gundam film to top the 1 billion yen mark since Char's Counterattack 33 years before.

== Notes ==
Preceded by SD Gundam World Heroes	Gundam metaseries (production order); 2021–ongoing	Succeeded by Gundam Breaker Battlogue
Preceded by Mobile Suit Gundam Narrative	Universal Century; U.C. 0105	Succeeded by Mobile Suit Gundam F91
