= Shūkō Murase =

Japanese anime director and animator (born 1964)

Shūkō Murase (村瀬 修功, Murase Shūkō; born May 31, 1964) is a Japanese anime director and animator. A former member of Sunrise, he is noted for contributing the character designs and key animation to Mobile Suit Gundam Wing and Argento Soma. In 2000, he contributed the main character designs to Final Fantasy IX. He made his directorial debut in 2002 with Witch Hunter Robin.

== Works ==
=== Anime television series ===
- Yoroiden Samurai Troopers (1988) (animation director)
- Mashin Eiyūden Wataru 2 (1990) (animation director)
- Mobile Suit Gundam F91 (1991) (animation director)
- Mobile Suit Victory Gundam (1993) (animation director)
- New Mobile Report Gundam Wing (1995) (character designs)
- Gasaraki (1998) (character designs)
- Argento Soma (2000) (character designs)
- Witch Hunter Robin (2002) (director, original creator)
- Samurai Champloo (2004) (key animation, storyboards, episode direction, ED animation)
- Ergo Proxy (2006) (director, storyboards, animation director)
- The Tower of Druaga: the Aegis of Uruk (2008) (storyboards)
- Gangsta (2015) (director)

=== OVA ===
- The Heroic Legend of Arslan (1991) (key animation)
- Mobile Suit Gundam 0083: Stardust Memory (1991) (key animation)
- Mobile Suit SD Gundam Matsuri SD Sengoku den Tenka Taihei hen (1993) (character design, animation director)
- Gundam Wing: Endless Waltz (1997) (character designs)
- Night Warriors: Darkstalkers' Revenge (1997) (character designs)
- Gundam Evolve 7 (2004) (director, storyboards, episode direction and management)
- Blade Runner Black Out 2022 (2017) (character design, animation director)

=== Film ===
- Street Fighter II: The Animated Movie (1994) (character designs)
- Gundam Wing: Endless Waltz -special edition- (1998) (character design)
- Final Fantasy: The Spirits Within (2001) (original character designs)
- Mobile Suit Zeta Gundam A New Translation: Heirs to the Stars (2005) (animation director, key animation)
- Mobile Suit Zeta Gundam III A New Translation: Love is the Pulse of the Stars (2006) (key animation)
- Dante's Inferno: An Animated Epic (2010) (segment director)
- Genocidal Organ (2017) (director, screenplay, character design, storyboard, key animation)
- Mobile Suit Gundam: Hathaway (2021) (director, storyboard, key animation)
- Mobile Suit Gundam: Hathaway's Flash – The Sorcery of Nymph Circe (2026) (director, storyboard, key animation)

=== Video games ===
- Final Fantasy IX (2000) (main character designs)

== Bibliography ==
- The Complete Works of Street Fighter II Movie (ストリートファイター2・映画資料全集). Shogakukan, 1994. ISBN 978-4091015792
- Top Creators Teach How to Characters (トップクリエイターが教えるキャラクターの創り方『サムライチャンプルー』『エルゴプラクシー』にみるアニメーション制作現場). MC Press, 2007. ISBN 978-4901972949
- Genocidal Organ Artworks (虐殺器官 アートワークス). Ichijinsha, 2017. ISBN 978-4758015370
