= Timeline of the COVID-19 pandemic in Japan =

The following is a timeline of the COVID-19 pandemic in Japan.

== Background ==
The COVID-19 pandemic in Japan can be divided into five waves based on the genome sequence of the country's COVID-19 virus. The National Institute of Infectious Diseases (Japan) (NIID) has determined from its genetic research that the COVID-19 variant of the first wave is derived from the Wuhan type that is prevalent in patients from China and East Asia. After entering Japan in January through travellers and returnees from China, the virus resulted in numerous infection clusters across the country before moving towards its disappearance in March. Japanese medical surveillance confirmed its first case of the virus on 16 January in a resident of Kanagawa Prefecture who had returned from Wuhan.

The first wave was followed by a second one that originated from a COVID-19 variant of the European type that is traced back to early patients from France, Italy, Sweden, and the United Kingdom. Japanese medical surveillance detected the second wave on 26 March when the government's expert panel concluded the likelihood of a new outbreak caused by travellers and returnees from Europe and the United States between 11 and 23 March. The NIID has established that the majority of viruses spreading in Japan since March is the European type. This has led it to conclude that the data "strongly suggests" that the Japanese government has succeeded in containing the Wuhan variant and that it is the European variant that is spreading across the country.

== Initial outbreak (January–March 2020) ==
=== January 2020 ===
On 16 January, Japan confirmed its first case of COVID-19 when a man in Kanagawa Prefecture who had previously travelled to Wuhan tested positive.

On 24 January, Tokyo Metropolis confirmed its first case of COVID-19. The Japanese government announced that it would provide repatriation services for all Japanese citizens in Hubei Province on that same day. Officials negotiated with Chinese authorities to dispatch five chartered flights to Wuhan from 29 January to 17 February.

On 27 January, Prime Minister Shinzo Abe labelled COVID-19 as a "designated infectious disease" under the Infectious Diseases Control Law and a "quarantinable infectious disease" under the Quarantine Act. On 30 January, Abe announced the establishment of a national task force to oversee the government's countermeasures against the novel coronavirus.

On 28 January, Nara Prefecture and Hokkaido Prefecture confirmed their first cases of COVID-19. On 29 January, Osaka Prefecture reported its first case on 29 January, followed by Mie Prefecture and Kyoto Prefecture on 30 January, and Chiba Prefecture on 31 January.

=== February 2020 ===
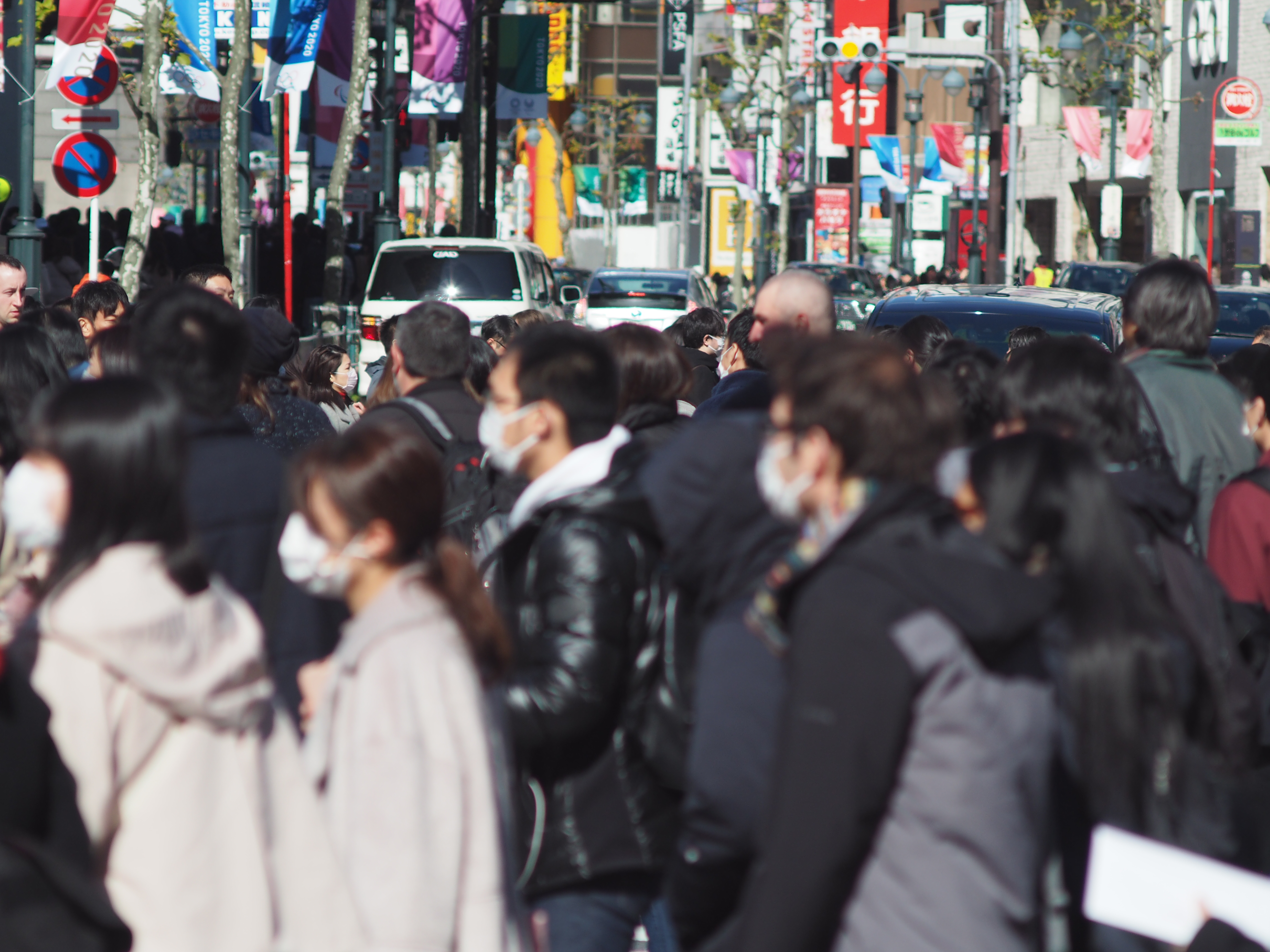
People in Tokyo wearing masks, February 2020

On 1 February, a passenger of the Diamond Princess cruise ship who had visited Hong Kong earlier tested positive. Although the ship had already completed quarantine at Naha en route to Yokohama, the government ordered the ship to re-quarantine in Yokohama.

On 3 February, the government announced entry restrictions for foreign citizens who had travelled in Hubei Province or had a Chinese passport issued from there.

On 12 February, the government announced entry restrictions for all foreign citizens who had travelled in Zhejiang Province or had a Chinese passport issued from there.

On 13 February, Wakayama Prefecture confirmed its first case of COVID-19. Japan announced its first COVID-19 fatality, a woman in her 80s from Kanagawa Prefecture. It was the third COVID-19 death outside mainland China.

On 14 February, Okinawa Prefecture confirmed its first case, followed by Aichi Prefecture on the 15th. On 20 February, Saitama and Fukuoka Prefectures confirmed their first cases of COVID-19. On 21 February, Ishikawa Prefecture and Kumamoto Prefecture reported their first cases, followed by Tochigi Prefecture on 22 February.

On 23 February, the US State Department raised its travel alert for Japan to level 2 on the four-level advisory scale due to the "sustained community spread" of COVID-19 within the country.

On 25 February, Nagano and Tokushima Prefectures reported their first cases, followed by Gifu Prefecture on 26 February.

On 27 February, Prime Minister Abe requested the closure of all elementary, junior high, and high schools from 2 March to the end of spring vacations in early April.

On 28 February, Hokkaido Prefecture declared a state of emergency and asked residents to refrain from going outside. Shizuoka Prefecture confirmed its first case of COVID-19 on that same day. On 29 February, Miyagi Prefecture, Kochi Prefecture, and Niigata Prefecture confirmed their first cases of COVID-19.

=== March 2020 ===
On 1 March, Hyogo Prefecture confirmed its first case of COVID-19. Ehime Prefecture reported its first case on 2 March, followed by Oita Prefecture on 3 March; Yamaguchi Prefecture and Miyazaki Prefecture on 4 March; Shiga Prefecture on 5 March; Akita Prefecture and Yamanashi Prefecture on 6 March; and Hiroshima Prefecture and Gunma Prefecture on 7 March.

On 2 March, schools were closed in almost all prefectures. Expanded rules for governmental paid leave for workers were announced.

On 5 March, Japan announced quarantine restrictions for all visitors arriving from China and South Korea. On 6 March, the South Korean government protested the restrictions by suspending visas for all Japanese citizens travelling to South Korea.

On 10 March, Japan officially classed the coronavirus outbreak as a national emergency. The government announced a 1 trillion yen ($9.6 billion) emergency package for businesses, including zero-interest loans for small and midsize companies and subsidies for freelance workers. Prime Minister Abe asked that large events be cancelled or postponed so that measures for containing the virus could be evaluated.

On 12 March, Japan reported 4 deaths from COVID-19.

On 13 March, Saga Prefecture confirmed its first case of COVID-19. Nagasaki Prefecture reported its first case on 14 March, followed by Ibaraki Prefecture and Kagawa Prefecture on 17 March, and Fukui Prefecture on 18 March.

On 16 March, the Japanese government announced it would expand entry restrictions to all foreign citizens of three areas in Spain, four areas in Italy, the Ticino region of Switzerland, and all of Iceland.

On 19 March, the governors of Osaka and Hyogo prefectures asked residents to avoid nonessential travel between the two neighbouring prefectures over the three-day weekend starting on 20 March. The three-week state of emergency in Hokkaido was lifted on that same day.

On 22 March, Okayama Prefecture confirmed its first case of COVID-19 and asked its residents to refrain from visiting the neighboring prefectures of Hyogo and Osaka. Aomori Prefecture reported its first case on 23 March, followed by Gifu Prefecture on 26 March.

On 23 March, Tokyo governor Yuriko Koike warned residents that a lockdown might be imposed if infections increased in Tokyo.

On 24 March, the International Olympic Committee (IOC) and Tokyo Organising Committee of the Olympic and Paralympic Games announced a one-year postponement of the 2020 Summer Olympics.

On 25 March, Ministry of Health, Labour and Welfare (MHLW) officials announced 71 people tested positive, including 41 cases in Tokyo. Governor Koike held an emergency press conference in the late afternoon to reaffirm the seriousness of the situation and asked people remain inside voluntarily for the next two weeks. Panic buying began following the announcement.

On 26 March, several governors of the Greater Tokyo Area, including Chiba, Kanagawa, Saitama, and Yamanashi, urged residents to follow stay-at-home requests to prevent a surge in infections. In Tokyo, residents were asked to work from home and refrain from going out at night and on the weekend.

On 27 March, MHLW officials announced 112 people had tested positive in a single day, including three Hanshin Tigers professional baseball players.

On 28 March, Prime Minister Abe held a press briefing about economic measures being prepared by the Japanese government amid concerns of infections increasing. Abe's wife was accused of attending a hanami party in defiance of COVID restrictions, which Abe denied.

On 28 March, 63 people tested positive in Tokyo.

On 29 March, MHLW officials announced 194 people had tested positive, including 58 people at a facility for the disabled in Tōnoshō, Chiba Prefecture. That day, 68 people tested positive in Tokyo, for a total of 430 confirmed cases of COVID-19, the largest among Japan's 47 prefectures.

On 30 March, tarento and comedian Ken Shimura died at the age of 70 from complications of a COVID-19 infection. It was the first major COVID death in Japan's entertainment industry.

On 30 March, Fukuoka City confirmed that an infant under one year old was infected; the infection of children that young was a rarity. On 30 March, Toyama Prefecture announced its first case, and a Kyoto government official announced several cases at Kyoto Sangyo University, including two students who had recently returned from Europe.

On 31 March, Tokyo reported 7 deaths and 78 new infections, for a total of 521 cases. 10 of the new cases were suspected to be tied to Eiju General Hospital in Taito Ward. Calls were made for the prime minister to declare a state of emergency, but both Prime Minister Abe and Chief Cabinet Secretary Suga denied that it was necessary.

== April 2020–June 2020 ==
=== April 2020 ===
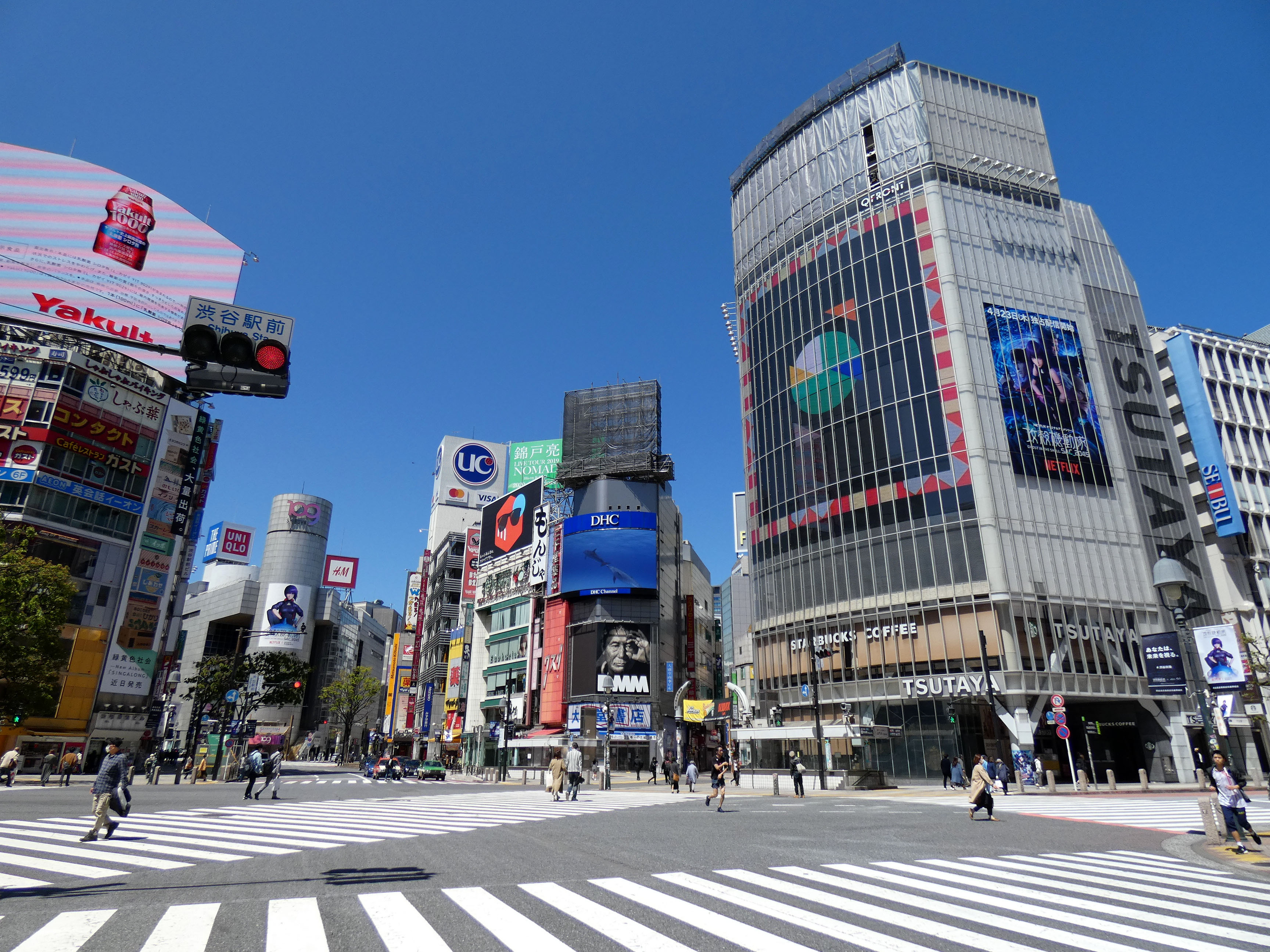
A noticeable lack of pedestrians in Shibuya Crossing during the state of emergency, April 2020

On 1 April, the government established a team to determine Japan's response to the coronavirus outbreak as well as other national challenges.

On 3 April, Japan expanded its entry ban to cover 73 countries and regions, barring entrance to the country to all foreigners, including those with Japanese residency or permanent residency, who had been in those parts of the world within 14 days of their arrival in Japan. The same day, Immigration Services Agency of Japan said it would extend the deadline for foreigners to renew their visas, so that their service centers would not be overwhelmed by demand.

On 4 April, 118 new cases were announced in Tokyo. Public pressure increased for Prime Minister Abe to declare a state of emergency, which he had been reluctant to do.

On 6 April, 83 new coronavirus cases were reported in Tokyo. The city's government planned to transfer patients with mild symptoms from hospitals to quarantine facilities to free up beds for patients with serious symptoms.

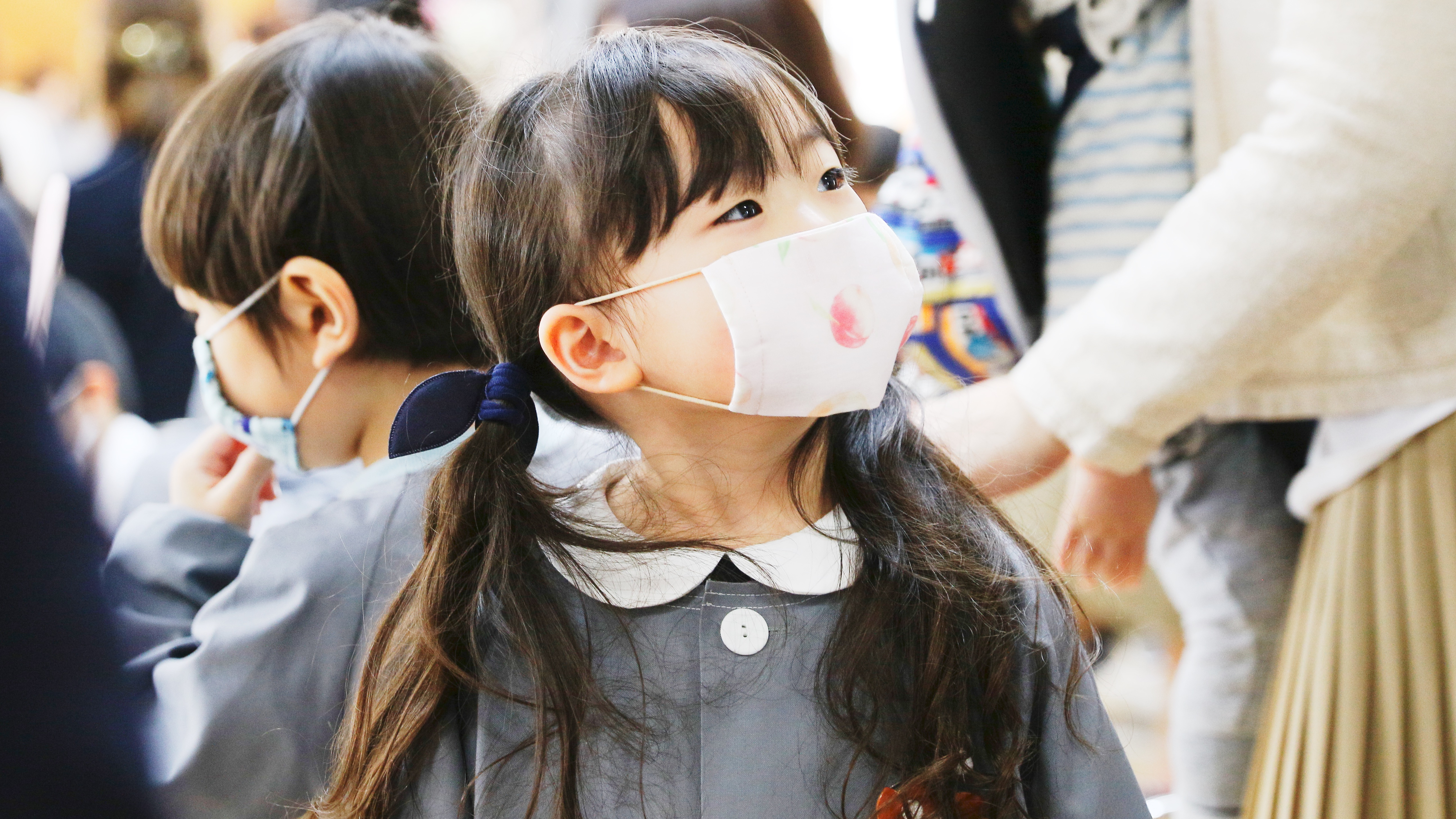
Children in a kindergarten wearing cloth masks, April 2020

On 7 April, Abe proclaimed a state of emergency from 8 April to 6 May for Tokyo and the prefectures of Kanagawa, Saitama, Chiba, Osaka, Hyogo and Fukuoka, but said there would be no lockdown measures. It was the first time a state of emergency had been declared in Japan. According to the Prime Minister, the pandemic had created the worst economic crisis in Japan since World War II.

On 8 April, Tokyo confirmed 144 new coronavirus cases. Infection routes could not be determined for over 60% of them.

On 10 April, Nippon Professional Baseball and the J-League cancelled all games in April.

On 11 April, 197 new coronavirus cases were confirmed in Tokyo, for a total of over 1,900 cases in the city.

On 12 April, Narita International Airport closed one of its two runways due to an 85 percent reduction in traffic caused by the virus.

On April 13, a second wave of infections hit Hokkaido, prompting the prefectural government to declare a second state of emergency that closed schools and that asked residents to avoid non-essential trips.

On 16 April, the government expanded the state of emergency to include all 47 prefectures in Japan and announced a plan to give 100,000 yen to every registered resident of Japan as a stimulus measure.

On 19 April, the first COVID death in the Chūgoku region was reported, in Hiroshima Prefecture.

On 20 April, the Ministry of Internal Affairs and Communications announced 25 deaths in a single day, the highest number of daily nationwide confirmed fatalities.

On 23 April, 29 deaths were announced, including actress Kumiko Okae. The same day, the National Police Agency reported that 73 police officers had tested positive since mid-March. Police had handled the bodies of 15 COVID-infected persons during that time, some of whom had died outside.

On 27 April, Yasutoshi Nishimura, Minister of State for Economic and Fiscal Policy, was tested for COVID-19 following contact with an infected person, although Nishimura was asymptomatic. He was criticized for taking priority over citizens with symptoms at a time when tests were difficult to come by.

On 30 April, Prime Minister Abe announced that Japanese authorities were having difficulty increasing the availability of COVID tests.

=== May 2020 ===
On 1 May, distribution of stimulus payments began for residents of small towns and villages.

On 3 May, Prime Minister Abe announced that it was unlikely that the government would be able to enact his 2018 plan to revise Article 9 of the Japanese Constitution, known as the "Peace Constitution", as a result of disruption caused by the pandemic. Democratic Party for the People leader Yuichiro Tamaki recommended resuming the project after the pandemic had ended.

On 4 May, the Japanese government extended the nationwide state of emergency until the end of May, as new infections had not slowed enough. The prime minister stated that restrictions would be reassessed after 14 May.

From 6 to 7 May, Governor Hirofumi Yoshimura and Nishimura engaged in a dispute in the press and social media about the government's requirements to lift the state of emergency. Yoshimura eventually apologized for the tone of his remarks.

On 7 May, schools in the lightly affected prefectures of Aomori and Tottori were reopened.

On 8 May, guidelines for testing were relaxed to allow more people to be tested.

On May 9, Tōhoku region had its first reported COVID-19 death, from Miyagi Prefecture.

On 10 May, Health, Labor and Welfare Minister Kato Katsunobu announced plans to provide government subsidies to assist businesses with paying workers, following COVID-related impacts to sales.

On 11 May, MHLW announced plans to approve a COVID-19 antigen test kit, which would provide faster results than the PCR test. Yuriko Koike announced that paperwork issues had resulted in a miscount of cases in Tokyo. 111 were omitted and 35 were duplicated, for a net increase of 76. These were set to be added to the total case count for Tokyo on 12 May.

On 14 May, the government suspended the state of emergency in 39 prefectures. Eight were excluded – four in Kanto, three in Kinki, and Hokkaido – because of strain to the medical system in those areas.

On 18 May, it was reported that Japan's economy had officially entered a state of recession for first time since 2015.

On 21 May, the state of emergency was lifted in the Kinki region after new infections dropped below 0.5 per 100,000 people in the previous week. Only 5 out of 47 prefectures remained in a state of emergency.

On 24 May, Fukuoka Prefecture announced four confirmed cases, including one case of a second infection in Fukuoka City, and three infections related to Kitakyushu City.

On 25 May, Prime Minister Abe lifted the emergency declaration for the remaining five prefectures.

On 28 May, Abe and his cabinet approved a 117.1 trillion yen relief package to provide financial relief for companies and individuals economically impacted by the virus.

On 28 May, Kitakyushu reported a total of 22 people infected at that time, with the infection route of 17 of them unknown. On 30 May, Kitakyushu reported 69 people infected over the past week, with the infection route of 27 of them unknown. On 31 May, the city of Kitakyushu closed public facilities after 12 people tested positive for COVID-19.

=== June 2020 ===
On 2 June, 34 new cases were reported in Tokyo.

On 5 June, the companies Hitachi, Toshiba, and Fujirebio announced they would collaborate to produce antigen-testing kits.

On 6 June, following rising infection numbers, economic revitalization minister Nishimura said that he and Tokyo Governor Yuriko Koike would discuss prevention measures for young people and nightlife districts.

On 8 June, it was reported that approval ratings for Prime Minister Abe had dropped as a result of his handling of the pandemic.

On 10 June, the Tokyo Olympic Committee announced that the postponed Summer Olympics, to be held in 2021, would be "simplified" to reduce their cost and reduce the spread of COVID-19.

On 11 June, the Tokyo metropolitan government lifted its warning about a possible increase in the number of coronavirus infections in the capital.

On 12 June, there were 61 new cases and 3 deaths. Japan eased restrictions on residents returning after foreign travel.

As of 13 June, Tokyo was seeing increased participation in nightlife following removal of restrictions on venues. Management of these establishments were required to record customer contact information for contact tracing, and were requested to maintain social distancing within their venues.

On 14 June, Japan reported 54 new cases, including 18 infections of nightlife employees in Shinjuku district. Hokkaido reported 7 cases, for a total of 1170. Kitakyushu reported 2 new cases. Japan's minister in charge of coronavirus response, the governor of Tokyo, and the mayor of Tokyo's Shinjuku Ward agreed to cooperate on measures to curb the rising trend of coronavirus infections in the capital's nightlife districts. In a survey, doctors reported declining work conditions at over 20% of hospitals, including "dismissals, salary reductions and forced closures".

On 15 June, 72 new cases were reported, including 48 in Tokyo, 6 in Hokkaido, and 1 in Kitakyushu.

On 17 June, it was reported that foreign travel to Japan had dropped to an all-time low in May. Numbers had been declining monthly since October 2019 as a result of COVID-19. Imports and exports had the largest year-to-year drop in over a decade.

On 18 June, 70 new cases were reported, with 41 in Tokyo. The Japanese government announced they were preparing to remove some restrictions. It was reported that Japan was reportedly the least satisfied with government support to businesses, in a survey covering the US, France, Germany, Britain, Sweden and Japan.

On 19 June, the Japanese government launched its contact tracing app, COCOA, but users reported having difficulty downloading it. Following delays, the 2020 Nippon Professional Baseball season started. Japanese clothing retailer Uniqlo launched a washable cloth mask. Demand was significant, resulting in their website crashing and long queues at brick and mortar stores.

On 21 June, there were 56 new cases, for a total of 17,931. 35 were in Tokyo, and 9 of these were discovered by inspection at two host clubs in Shinjuku. Osaka Prefecture reported a cluster of 3 infections.

On 24 June, 55 cases were confirmed in Tokyo, the highest since the declaration of emergency. The total number of cases in Tokyo was 5,895.

On 25 June, the government announced it would reorganize their coronavirus advisory panel to include infectious disease specialists, local representatives, and risk management experts. That day, the government reported 82 new cases, with 48 in Tokyo. 21 of the Tokyo cases were related to the entertainment district. It was Tokyo's second day in a row with over 40 new cases.

On 26 June, there were over 100 new cases nationally. Tokyo confirmed 54 new cases.

On 28 June, Tokyo recorded 60 new coronavirus cases. Tokyo Governor Yuriko Koike denied that it was a "second wave" of COVID-19. Most of the new cases were associated with entertainment facilities and public spaces such as schools and offices.

On 29 June, Japan reported over 100 new cases nationally, with 58 in Tokyo. Over 30 of Tokyo's cases were related to the nightlife district; 80% of the Tokyo cases were people were in their 20s and 30s. Kanagawa Prefecture reported 31 cases, including 26 employees of the same host club in Naka Ward, Yokohama.

On 30 June, 130 new cases were reported, with 54 in Tokyo. 15 of the Tokyo cases were associated with the nightlife district.

== July 2020 ==
=== July 1–7 ===
On July 1, Tokyo reported 67 new cases, many of which were tied to nightlife venues in Shinjuku and Ikebukuro. 10 cases were confirmed in Osaka Prefecture.

On 2 July, 190 new cases were confirmed nationwide, the greatest number since the end of the state of emergency on 25 May. Tokyo reported 107 new cases. MHLW reported that over 30,000 people had lost work due to the pandemic.

On 3 July, 250 new cases of COVID were confirmed nationwide, with 124 in Tokyo. Cases in Tokyo and Kagoshima prefecture were linked to nightlife establishments such as host bars. Tokyo Governor Yuriko Koike reminded residents to avoid such venues, but did not impose any closures or restrictions.

On 4 July, 262 cases were reported nationwide, with 131 in Tokyo, 23 in Kagoshima, 17 in Osaka, and 9 in Kyoto. Infections among young people continued to be primarily linked to nightlife establishments. Governor Yuriko Koike asked Tokyo residents to refrain from travelling outside the city except in emergencies. Yamagata Prefecture had its first confirmed case since 4 May.

On 5 July, 208 cases were confirmed nationwide; the third consecutive day with over 200 new infections. Tokyo had 111 new cases, with 46 related to nightlife. The cumulative number of confirmed cases in Tokyo was 6,765. Other cities reporting cases included Saitama with 21 new cases, Kanagawa with 20, and Chiba with 7. Kagoshima Prefecture had 13, Fukuoka Prefecture had 9. Miyazaki Prefecture had one new case, the first since April 11.

On 6 July, 176 cases were confirmed nationwide. Tokyo had 102; the fifth consecutive day with over 100. Saitama had 16, Kagoshima had 12, and Kanagawa had 11. The new government expert panel approved a plan to lift pandemic restrictions so long as preventative measures were followed.

On 7 July, 214 cases were confirmed nationwide, for a total of 20,866 known cases in the country, including people from the Diamond Princess cruise ship. Tokyo had 106; the sixth consecutive day with over 100. There was one death each in Saitama and Chiba prefectures, for a total of 993 dead nationwide. Saitama had 27, Osaka had 12, Chiba had 11, and Kanagawa, Kyoto and Kagoshima each had 9.

=== July 8–14 ===
On July 8, 207 cases were confirmed nationwide. Tokyo had 75 cases, for a cumulative total of 7,048 in the city. Saitama Prefecture had 48 cases, the highest since the state of emergency was lifted on 25 May. Kanagawa Prefecture had 23 cases and one death. Yamagata Prefecture also had one death, bringing the national total to 995 COVID fatalities.

On 9 July, 355 cases were confirmed nationwide, bringing the total to 20,763. It was the first time there were over 300 new cases since the state of emergency had been lifted. The government's expert panel raised the COVID severity rating to the second-highest level, indicating a need to strengthen the medical system. Restrictions on events were eased, with attendance limits increased from 1,000 to 5,000. Professional sports were permitted to have spectators again. Tokyo confirmed 224 cases, the highest ever in the city. The cumulative number of confirmed cases in Tokyo was 7,272. Governor Yuriko Koike blamed the increase on increased testing rather than a failure of containment methods, but called the numbers "a warning". Osaka Prefecture had 31 cases.

On July 10, 411 new cases were confirmed, with 243 in Tokyo, 32 in Kanagawa, 27 in Saitama, and 22 in Osaka. The cumulative number of confirmed cases in Tokyo was 7,515.

On 11 July, 385 new cases were confirmed, bringing the total number of cases to 21,528. It was the third consecutive day of over 300 new cases. Tokyo had 206 new cases, with 7,721 infections total. It was the third consecutive day of over 200 infections in the city. Kanagama had 34 new cases and one death, bringing the national death total to 996. Saitama had 35 new cases, Osaka had 28, and Chiba had 13. 61 cases were reported at two United States Marine Corps bases in Okinawa Prefecture; the bases were put on lockdown in response. The government announced plans to allow foreigners to re-enter Japan after travelling abroad as long as they had a negative PCR test. The parade for the Jidai Matsuri festival in Kyoto was cancelled.

On July 12, Japan reported 409 new coronavirus cases, including 206 in Tokyo, 32 in Osaka Prefecture, and 31 in Chiba Prefecture. The opposition party demanded that the state of emergency be reinstated, but the government refused, stating that most new cases were young people, there were still plenty of hospital beds available, and that restrictions would negatively affect the economy.

On 13 July, 261 new cases were reported, for a total of 22,318. One woman died in Hokkaido, bringing the national death total to 984. Tokyo reported 119 new cases (with one cluster of 37 from a live music theatre in Shinjuku), Saitama Prefecture had 26, Osaka Prefecture had 18, and Chiba and Kanagawa Prefectures each had 17. 32 new cases at Marine Corps Air Station Futenma, all American personnel, were also reported. The government launched a campaign to promote domestic tourism within Japan to boost the economy, prompting public criticism.

On 14 July, 333 new cases were reported, with no new deaths. Tokyo had 143, bringing the city's total to 8,139. In the area surrounding Tokyo, there were 42 in Saitama Prefecture, 28 in Kanagawa Prefecture and 25 in Chiba Prefecture. In western Japan, there were 20 cases in Osaka Prefecture, 12 in Kyoto Prefecture, and 9 in Hyogo Prefecture. There were 3 in Gifu Prefecture.

=== July 15–21 ===
On 15 July, 455 new cases were reported. 165 new COVID-19 cases were confirmed in Tokyo. Tokyo Governor Yuriko Koike asked residents not to travel outside of Tokyo or visit dining and nightlife establishments with poor COVID-19 prevention measures. The prefecture with the highest caseload was Osaka Prefecture, with 61. 43 people were positive in Kanagawa Prefecture. 13 cases were confirmed in Hokkaido.

On 19 July, 511 new cases were reported, for a national total of 25,493. 188 were in Tokyo, 89 in Osaka prefecture, and 32 in Fukuoka prefecture. Of the 188 cases in Tokyo, 118 had unknown infection routes.

On 20 July, 419 new cases were reported, for a national total of 25,791. 168 of the new cases were in Tokyo, 49 in Osaka, 32 in Fukuoka, 29 in Saitama, 27 in Kyoto, and 18 in Chiba. There were two deaths, bringing the national total to 1,001.

On 21 July, 631 new cases were reported, with 237 from Tokyo. There were 72 in Osaka, 53 each in Fukuoka and Aichi, 47 in Saitama, 20 in Kyoto, and 14 in Gifu. 949 people were hospitalized with COVID-19 as of this date. There was one death in Saitama, bringing the national total to 1,002. Governor Koike announced that she had secured 2,400 hospital beds for people with serious illnesses.

=== July 22–31 ===
On 22 July, 795 new cases were reported, bringing the national total to 27,982. 238 of the new cases were in Tokyo, 121 in Osaka, 68 in Kanagawa, and 64 in Aichi. The Japanese government launched a program to promote domestic tourism to boost the economy, although Tokyo was not included due to high infection numbers.

On 23 July, 981 new cases were reported, bringing the national total to 28,197. There were 366 cases in Tokyo. It was the first time that the city had had more than 300 new cases in one day. There were also 104 in Osaka, 97 in Aichi, 64 in Saitama, 53 in Kanagawa, 33 in Chiba, 17 in Shiga, 13 in Nara, and 9 in Wakayama. There were two deaths, bringing the national total to 1,005. The Japanese government opened a COVID-19 response bureau and began consulting with neighbouring countries about mutual permission of travel for business purposes.

On 24 July, 768 new cases were reported, bringing the national total to 28,895. There were 260 cases in Tokyo, 149 in Osaka, 63 in Aichi, 52 in Fukuoka, 45 in Saitama, and 14 in Kagoshima. Officials in Kagoshima asked people to refrain from travelling to islands in their prefecture. There were three new deaths, bringing the total to 1,008. More than 200 patients were admitted to the hospital for the fourth consecutive day, exceeding 1,000 for the first time in about two months. The Tokyo Metropolitan Children's Medical Center announced restrictions on patient intake as a safety measure after four doctors were infected.

On 25 July, 787 new cases were reported. 295 were in Tokyo, 132 in Osaka, 78 in Aichi, 50 in Fukuoka, and 35 in Saitama. There were also 64 infections at U.S. military facilities in Japan, including Marine Corps Air Station Futenma and Camp Hansen. There were two deaths, bringing the reported national total to 1,009.

On 26 July, 835 new cases were reported. 239 were in Tokyo, 141 in Osaka, 90 in Fukuoka, 49 in Hyogo, and 21 in Kumamoto.

On 27 July, 596 new cases were reported, for a total of 31,203. It was the first day in seven days with less than 600 cases, possibly due to a reduction in testing over the Marine Day holiday weekend. There were 131 cases in Tokyo, 87 in Osaka, 76 in Aichi, and 18 in Okinawa. A death in Kyoto brought the total to 1,012.

On 28 July, 980 new cases were reported, bringing the national total to 32,956. There were 266 cases in Tokyo, 155 in Osaka, and 110 in Aichi. The death toll increased to 1,015, with three new deaths.

On 29 July, over 1,000 new cases were reported. 250 of the new cases came from Tokyo. Osaka, Aichi, Fukuoka and Okinawa prefectures all set single-day records for new infections. Iwate Prefecture, the last remaining prefecture without any cases, reported its first two cases. It was suggested that the large increase came as a result of delayed testing following the Marine Day holiday weekend.

On 30 July, 1,305 new cases were reported. Urban areas in particular reported record numbers of infections. 367 new cases were reported in Tokyo, bringing the city's cases to 12,228. Many of the infected were between 20 and 30 years old; in response, the metropolitan government asked restaurants and karaoke bars to reduce their hours until the end of August.

On July 31, 1,578 new cases were reported, with 463 in Tokyo. The Osaka prefectural government requested that venues serving alcohol either shut completely or reduce their hours until August 20.

== August–September 2020 ==
On 12 August, the number of infections in Japan exceeded 50,000.

On 22 August, the number of infections in Japan exceeded 60,000.

On 4 September, the total number of infections exceeded 70,000.

On 24 September, the total number of infections exceeded 80,000, due to declining numbers of reports for the daily record of infected people.

== October–December 2020 ==
=== October ===
On 14 October, the total number of contracted infections in Japan exceeded 90,000 despite a decrease in reported cases over the preceding weeks.

By the end of October, the total number of infections in Japan exceeded 100,000.

=== November ===
On 17 November, there were 1,699 new cases reported, including 298 in Tokyo.

On 18 November, there were 2,202 new cases, including 493 in Tokyo.

On 19 November, there were 2,387 new cases, including 534 in Tokyo.

On 20 November, there were 2,426 new cases, including 504 in Tokyo.

On 21 November, there were 2,596 new cases, including 539 in Tokyo.

On 24 November, the government removed the Sapporo and Osaka regions from their domestic tourism incentive program due to increased infections. The Tokyo government strongly recommended that restaurants shorten their business hours due to weeks of increased infections.

On 26 November, 1,946 there were new cases, bringing the national total to 138,499. There were 21 new deaths, bringing the total to 2,499.

On 27 November, 2,504 there were new cases, bringing the national total to 141,020. There were 29 new deaths, bringing the total to 2,591.

=== December ===
At the beginning of December, the government proposed extending the domestic tourism promotion campaign through the end of the Golden Week holidays in early May 2021.

As of 2 December, the cumulative number of confirmed cases in Japan exceeded 150,000.

On 3 December, Japan reported 2,518 new cases, 533 from Tokyo. 36 new deaths were reported, of which 11 came from the northern prefecture of Hokkaido.

== 2021 ==
On 13 January, the state of emergency was expanded to 11 cities including Tochigi, Gifu, Aichi, Kyoto, Osaka, Hyogo and Fukuoka.

== 2022 ==
The isolation period for travellers to Japan was reduced to seven days.
