= Fukushi Ochiai =

Japanese voice actor

- 落合 福嗣
- Born: August 20, 1987 (age 39); Nagoya, Aichi, Japan
- Occupation: Voice actor
- Years active: 2015–present
- Agent: Aoni Production
- Parents: Hiromitsu Ochiai (father); Nobuko Ochiai (mother)
- Relatives: Giant Ochiai (cousin)
- Awards: Best New Actor Award at the 13th Seiyu Awards

Fukushi Ochiai (落合 福嗣, Ochiai Fukushi; born August 20, 1987) is a Japanese voice actor from Nagoya, Aichi who is affiliated with Aoni Production. He's also one of four male voice actors who won the Best New Actor Award at the 13th Seiyu Awards.

== Biography ==
Ochiai frequently appeared on television during his early years because his father was a highly famous professional baseball player in Japan.

== Filmography ==
=== Television animation ===
- Grimgar of Fantasy and Ash (2016), Moguzo
- All Out!! (2016), Takeo Atsuta
- Hugtto! PreCure, (2018), Charalit
- Gurazeni (2018), Natsunosuke Bonda
- Hinomaru Sumo (2018), Shinya Ozeki
- Beastars (2019), Sanou
- ID: Invaded (2020), Tsukimaru Nishimura
- One Piece (2021), Teach (young), Bjorn (pirate)
- Those Snow White Notes (2021), Ushio Arakawa
- Remake Our Life! (2021), Mikio Sugimoto
- Platinum End (2021), Mirai's Uncle
- Tribe Nine (2022), Manami Daimon
- Shine On! Bakumatsu Bad Boys! (2022), Bō
- Boruto: Naruto Next Generations (2022), Daizen Matsushige
- Rurouni Kenshin (2023), Hyottoko
- You Were Experienced, I Was Not: Our Dating Story (2023), Yūsuke Ijichi
- Dark Gathering (2023), Daisuke Gonda
- Snack Basue (2024), Tatsu-nii
- The Prince of Tennis II: U-17 World Cup Semifinal (2024), Dankmar Schneider
- 365 Days to the Wedding (2024), Hiromi Gonda
- Dragon Ball Daima (2024), Majin Duu
- Tojima Wants to Be a Kamen Rider (2025), Fukushi Ishige
- Kaya-chan Isn't Scary (2026), Mobuo
- Otherworldly Munchkin: Let's Speedrun the Dungeon with Only 1 HP! (2027), Rocinante
- Shin Kochira Katsushika-ku Kameari Kōen Mae Hashutsujo (2027), Kankichi Ryōtsu

=== Animated films ===
- Natsume's Book of Friends the Movie (2018), Habaki
- Her Blue Sky (2019), Masamichi Nakamura
- A Whisker Away (2020), Hajime
- Mobile Suit Gundam: Hathaway's Flash (2021), Raymond Cain
- Dakaichi: Spain Arc (2021), Antonio
- Teasing Master Takagi-san: The Movie (2022), Kimura
- The Rose of Versailles (2025), Louis XVI
- Mobile Suit Gundam: Hathaway – The Sorcery of Nymph Circe (2026), Raymond Cain

=== Video games ===
- Yakuza 4, himself
- Atelier Ryza: Ever Darkness & the Secret Hideout (2019), Lumbar Dorn
- Bravely Default 2 (2021), Helio
- Master Detective Archives: Rain Code (2023), Dominic Fulltank

=== Dubbing ===
==== Live-action ====
- The Human Centipede 3 (Final Sequence) (2015), Inmate 333
- Fantastic Beasts and Where to Find Them (2016), Sam
- Project Runway (2017), Jake
- Shazam! (2019), Burke Breyer
- Midsommar, (2020), Pelle
- The Tomorrow War, (2021), Charlie
- Clifford the Big Red Dog, (2022), Malik
- Jaws 2, (2022), Andy Nicholas
- Marry Me, (2022), Colin Calloway
- Shazam! Fury of the Gods, (2023), Burke Breyer

==== Animation ====
- Ballerina (Mathurin)
- The Cat in the Hat (Gary)
- Luca (Ciccio)
- Maya the Bee (Crawley)
- PAW Patrol: The Movie (Butch)
- Strange World (Caspian)
- Victor and Valentino (Valentino)
- Wish (Simon)
