= Mobile Suit Gundam Narrative =

- Official illustration used for the Final Theatrical Poster of the film, showing the main cast and the RX-0 Unicorn Gundam 03 Phenex

Japanese name
- Kanji: 機動戦士ガンダムNT (ナラティブ)
Transcriptions
- Revised Hepburn: Kidō Senshi Gandamu NT (Naratibu)
- Directed by: Toshikazu Yoshizawa
- Screenplay by: Harutoshi Fukui
- Story by: Harutoshi Fukui
- Based on: Phoenix Hunting by Harutoshi Fukui Gundam by Yoshiyuki Tomino & Hajime Yatate
- Starring: Junya Enoki; Tomo Muranaka; Ayu Matsuura; Yūichirō Umehara; Ayumi Fujimura; Kōki Uchiyama
- Cinematography: Kentaro Waki
- Edited by: Daisuke Imai
- Music by: Hiroyuki Sawano
- Production company: Sunrise (Studio 1)
- Distributed by: Shochiku
- Release date: November 30, 2018
- Running time: 89 minutes
- Country: Japan
- Language: Japanese
- Box office: $6 million

Mobile Suit Gundam Narrative (Japanese: 機動戦士ガンダムNT (ナラティブ), Hepburn: Kidō Senshi Gandamu NT (Naratibu)) is a Japanese animated mecha science fiction film produced by Sunrise and distributed by Shochiku. Released as part of the Gundam franchise, it is based on the 11th Gundam Unicorn novel, Phoenix Hunting. It was directed by Toshikazu Yoshizawa (Mobile Suit Gundam Thunderbolt) and written by Harutoshi Fukui, with character designs by Kumiko Takahashi, Sejoon Kim, Hajime Katoki, and Eiji Komatsu. The film was released in Japanese theaters on November 30, 2018.

== Story ==
In UC 0096, the conflict dubbed the "Laplace Incident" ended with the dissolution of the Neo Zeon remnant group "Sleeves". Both the Unicorn Gundam and the Banshee were supposedly dismantled. With the original draft of the Universal Century Charter revealed, the existence of Newtypes and their promised rights have become known to the public. One year later, in UC 0097, the world is largely unchanged despite these revelations. The reappearance of the RX-0 Gundam unit 3 Phenex, "brother" to the Unicorn and Banshee, two years after it disappeared, triggers the Federation to launch Operation "Phoenix Hunt" to capture the mobile suit. Minister Monaghan Bakharo of the Republic of Zeon secretly directs a Zeon unit to the same objective through his operative Ellic Hugo. Mineva Lao Zabi, the figurehead "princess" of Zeon, calls out Monaghan's ambitions, though she cannot directly intervene.

The powerful corporation Luio & Co. assigns Michele Luio and pilot Jona Basta along with the RX-9 Narrative Gundam to assist the Federation. Michele and Jona's childhood friend, Rita Bernal, is believed to be in control of the Phenex. Rita, Michele, and Jona were declared the "Miracle Children" after predicting the colony drop from Zeon's "Operation British" at the opening of the One Year War, saving many lives. Michele and Jona know that only Rita displayed true Newtype precognition. The Federation and Zeon teams detect the Phenex within a college colony at Side 6. The two sides race to the scene, though the Phenex is nowhere to be found. Piloting a Sinanju Stein, Zeon pilot Zoltan Akkanen, a failed product of the project that created Full Frontal, attacks Jona and the Narrative Gundam and inflicts serious damage to the colony. Zoltan summons the II Neo Zeong mobile armor to help him destroy Jona, and the massive armor breaches the hull of colony. The conflict ends after the Phenex finally appears and disrupts the encounter before escaping.

In the aftermath of the disastrous events within the colony, Minister Monaghan instructs Ellic to flee her ship as he intends to blame the event on rogue Sleeves remnants and have the Federation destroy the rest of the force. Zoltan overhears the communication and murders Ellic. He suffers a psychotic break and launches in the II Neo Zeong with no greater intent than mass destruction. Michele reveals she orchestrated the encounter in the colony in order to draw out the Phenex. As teenagers, she, Rita, and Jona became victims of the vicious Cyber Newtype experiments by the Titans. Michele had arranged for her own adoption by Luio & Co. after tricking Jona into helping her sacrifice Rita to extreme experimentation, intending to free Rita with Luio & Co. resources. However, after the dissolution of the Titans, the Federation continued to use Rita as the test pilot of the Phenex, eventually leading to her disappearance when the Phenex went berserk during a test. She believes she will be absolved of her guilt over Rita when she unlocks the key to immortality within the Phenex—the ability of a psycho-frame to absorb the soul of a dying person, as has happened with the Phenex and Rita, who died after escaping with the Phenex.

The Federation fears Zoltan’s assault will cause a rain of debris on Earth even more devastating than Operation British. Jona, Michele, and the Federation forces sortie to defeat Zoltan, joined by the Phenex. The II Neo Zeong proves too powerful and is on the verge of defeating the combined forces. Michele sacrifices herself to protect Jona's heavily damaged Narrative Gundam. Banagher Links arrives in the ARX-014S Silver Bullet Suppressor, intervening to allow Jona to enter the Phenex' empty cockpit. The united souls of Jona, Rita, and Michele drive the Phenex's psycho-frame to contain the destructive power of the II Neo Zeong's own psycho-frame, killing Zoltan and saving the Earth. Jona is released from the Phenex before it speeds away at incredible speed, and is rescued by Banagher, who encourages Jona that the story is not over yet. The RX-0 Unicorn Gundam, believed to have been dismantled, is shown to be sealed away by Mineva and Banagher, in case it needs to be called on again.

== Voice cast ==
Character	Japanese	English
Jona Basta	Junya Enoki	Griffin Puatu
Michele Luio	Tomo Muranaka	Erika Ishii; Emiko Dunn (young)
Rita Bernal	Ayu Matsura	Brianna Knickerbocker
Mauri	Naoki Tamanoi	TBA
Iago Haakana	Kazuya Nakai	Chris Tergliafera
Franson	Takanori Hoshino	Phillip Reich
Amaya	Setsuji Satō	TBA
Delao	Yūki Arai	Zeno Robinson
Pavel	Takahiro Shimada	TBA
Taman	Wataru Komada	Brandon Winckler
Abayev	Kazuhiro Yamaji	TBA
Brick Teclato	Makoto Furukawa	Daniel J. Edwards
Zoltan Akkanen	Yūichirō Umehara	Stefan Martello
Ellic Hugo	Aya Endō	Faye Mata
Monaghan Bakharo	Masaki Terasoma	TBA
Mineva Lao Zabi	Ayumi Fujimura	Stephanie Sheh
Suberoa Zinnerman	Hideaki Tezuka	J. David Brimmer
Banagher Links	Kōki Uchiyama	Steve Staley
Martha Vist Carbine	Tomoko Shiota	Ellyn Stern
Flaste Schole	Rikiya Koyama	Patrick Seitz
Takuya Irei	Hiro Shimono	Robby Duncan Sharpe
Quattro Bajeena	Shūichi Ikeda	Keith Silverstein

== Production and promotion ==
The film project was first teased by Sunrise after they registered the domain name "gundam-nt.net" on April 5, 2018. It was formally announced during an official live stream at Gundam Base Tokyo on April 20, 2018, which revealed the teaser trailer for the film as well as the characters. Included in the announcement were the titular mobile suit, the Narrative Gundam, alongside redesigned versions of the Sinanju Stein and the Unicorn Gundam 03 Phenex. The film is the first in Sunrise's "UC NexT 0100" project, which will cover the events of the next 100 years in the Universal Century timeline. Aside from the film, two additional Gundam projects were also revealed by Sunrise: a film trilogy adaptation of Yoshiyuki Tomino's Mobile Suit Gundam: Hathaway's Flash novels and an overseas live-action sequel to Mobile Suit Gundam Unicorn. Fukui jokingly told the audience to "pretend you didn't see that".

On August 15, the film's theatrical poster was revealed alongside the new cast and voice actors for the upcoming film. The initial date of release in theaters was also revealed. Upon the release of the theatrical poster, netizens in Twitter created parody pictures due to the bizarre poses of the main characters in the poster, based on the 16th century sculpture The Rape of the Sabine Women. In a cross-promotion with Gen Urobuchi's film Godzilla: The Planet Eater, a special theatrical poster was unveiled alongside merchandise and advanced pre-orders of tickets for both films, and a special trailer for the crossover was later aired. Sunrise later aired the final film trailer on November 29, 2018.

== Media ==
=== Film ===
The film premiered in theaters across Japan on November 30, 2018. Odex announced they will distribute the film in theaters across Southeast Asia, with screening dates being announced at a later date. An English dub is also announced to be in the works, with NYAV Post producing it and Oscar Garcia set to be the ADR Director of the dub. The film was released in theaters on the United States on February 19, 2019 for one night only. The film's ending theme song is titled "Narrative" by Hiroyuki Sawano and LiSA. The film was licensed for release by Anime Limited in the U.K. for the 30 of November 2020.

=== Merchandise ===
Part of the film's merchandise will be released under Bandai's long running Gunpla line of scale models, with the High Grade Universal Century versions of the Narrative Gundam, Sinanju Stein, and the Unicorn Gundam 03 Phenex announced for a Fall 2018 release.

=== Video games ===
In Mobile Suit Gundam Extreme Vs. 2, Narrative Gundam (B-Packs and C-Packs) is a playable unit and later supplanted by the Sinanju Stein (Narrative unit). In Mobile Suit Gundam Extreme Vs. 2 XBoost, Unicorn Phenex was later added as a playable unit.

Mobile Suit Gundam Narrative is one of the entry series of Super Robot Wars 30.

=== Manga ===
A manga adaptation, by Kōzō Ōmori was serialized in Kadokawa's Gundam Ace from November 26, 2018, to August 26, 2025, and was collected into 16 volumes.

== Critical reception ==
Kim Morrissy of Anime News Network gave the film an overall rating of B, praising the film's interesting concept and tie-in with Gundam Unicorn while criticizing its sparse characterization and weak character animation.

== Box office ==
Mobile Suit Gundam Narrative grossed $4,615,833 in Japan, $1,230,831 in China, and $259,224 in the USA, bringing its worldwide total to $6 million.

== See also ==
- Mobile Suit Gundam Unicorn

Preceded by Gundam Build Divers	Gundam metaseries (production order); 2018	Succeeded by SD Gundam World Sangoku Soketsuden
Preceded by Mobile Suit Gundam: Twilight Axis	Universal Century; U.C. 0097	Succeeded by Mobile Suit Gundam: Hathaway's Flash
