= Best Selection (Aimer album) =

Best Selection is the title of two compilation albums released by Aimer on May 3, 2017. Each album was released in three versions: a regular CD edition, a limited CD + Blu-ray edition (Type-A), and a limited CD + DVD edition (Type-B).

== Best Selection "blanc" ==
Best Selection "blanc"

Compilation album by Aimer
- Released: May 3, 2017
- Genre: Pop; rock
- Length: 70:53
- Language: Japanese; English
- Label: SME Records

Aimer chronology
daydream (2016)	Best Selection "blanc" (2017)	Sun Dance & Penny Rain (2019)

Limited Edition cover

Best Selection "blanc" is a compilation of Aimer's soft ballads such as "Kataomoi", "Rokutosei no Yoru", and "Chouchou Musubi", and includes the new songs "March of Time" and "Kachou Fugetsu". The album peaked at #3 on Oricon's Weekly Album Chart on May 15, 2017 and charted for 87 weeks.

=== Track listing ===
CD
No.	Title	Original album	Length
1.	"Rokutousei no Yoru" (六等星の夜; "Night of Sixth Magnitude Star")	Sleepless Nights	5:37
2.	"Chouchou Musubi" (蝶々結び; "Butterfly Knot")	daydream	5:05
3.	"Anata ni Deawanakereba ~Kasetsutouka~" (あなたに出会わなければ～夏雪冬花～; "If I Hadn't Met You ~Summer Snow, Winter Flowers~")	Sleepless Nights	6:02
4.	"Polaris" (ポラリス)	After Dark	6:07
5.	"Re:pray"	Sleepless Nights	5:07
6.	"Hoshikuzu Venus" (星屑ビーナス; "Stardust Venus")	Sleepless Nights	4:14
7.	"broKen NIGHT"	DAWN	4:56
8.	"Kataomoi" (カタオモイ; "Unrequited Love")	daydream	3:27
9.	"Kimi wo Matsu" (君を待つ; "I Will Wait for You")	DAWN	4:27
10.	"Akanesasu" (茜さす; "Glowing Red")	"Akanesasu / everlasting snow" single	5:29
11.	"Yuki no Furu Machi" (雪の降る街; "Town of Falling Snow")	Sleepless Nights	4:05
12.	"everlasting snow"	"Akanesasu / everlasting snow" single	5:37
13.	"March of Time"		4:56
14.	"Kachou Fugetsu" (歌鳥風月)		5:44
Total length:			70:53

Blu-ray / DVD
No.	Title	Length
1.	"Chouchou Musubi (蝶々結び)" (Music video)
2.	"Re:pray" (Music video)
3.	"Anata ni Deawanakereba ~ Kasetsutouka ~ (あなたに出会わなければ～夏雪冬花～)" (Music video)
4.	"Polaris (ポラリス, Porarisu)" (Music video)
5.	"Kimi wo Matsu (君を待つ)" (Music video)
6.	"Kataomoi (カタオモイ)" (Music video)
7.	"broKen NIGHT" (Music video)
8.	"Akanesasu (茜さす)" (Music video)
9.	"Yuki no Furumachi (雪の降る街)" (Music video)
10.	"everlasting snow" (Music video)
11.	"Rokutousei no Yoru (六等星の夜)" (Music video)
12.	"Sabishikute Nemurenai Yoru wa (寂しくて眠れない夜は)" (Live from Aimer Hall Tour 2016 @ Tokyo International Forum Hall A on 6 November 2016)
13.	"Natsukusa ni Kimi wo Omou (夏草に君を想う)" (Live from Aimer Hall Tour 2016 @ Tokyo International Forum Hall A on 6 November 2016)

=== Charts ===
Chart (2017)	Peak position
Japanese Hot Albums (Billboard)	3
Japanese Albums (Oricon)	3
South Korean International Albums (Gaon)	4

=== Sales and certifications ===
Region	Certification	Certified units/sales
Japan (RIAJ)	Gold	100,000^{^}
South Korea	—	500
^{^} Shipments figures based on certification alone.

== Best Selection "noir" ==
Best Selection "noir"

Compilation album by Aimer
- Released: May 3, 2017
- Genre: Pop; rock
- Length: 64:03
- Language: Japanese; English
- Label: SME Records

Aimer chronology
daydream (2016)	Best Selection "noir" (2017)	Sun Dance & Penny Rain (2019)

Limited Edition cover

In contrast to the "blanc" album, Best Selection "noir" compiles Aimer's heavier, rock-oriented tracks such as "RE:I AM", "Brave Shine", and "StarRingChild", and includes the new song "zero". The album peaked at #4 on Oricon's Weekly Album Chart on May 15, 2017 and charted for 66 weeks.

=== Track listing ===
CD
No.	Title	Original album	Length
1.	"StarRingChild"	Midnight Sun	5:28
2.	"Brave Shine"	DAWN	3:51
3.	"insane dream"	daydream	4:12
4.	"Stars in the rain"	daydream	5:00
5.	"Nemuri no Mori" (眠りの森; "Forest of Sleep")	Midnight Sun	4:34
6.	"LAST STARDUST"	DAWN	5:18
7.	"Kogoesou na Kisetsu Kara -extended ver.-" (凍えそうな季節から -extended ver.-; "From the Freezing Season -extended ver.-")	"Kogoesou na Kisetsu Kara" single	3:46
8.	"Dare ka, Umi wo" (誰か、海を。; "Someone, the Sea.")	DAWN	4:54
9.	"ninelie"	daydream	4:20
10.	"holLow wORlD"	"broKen NIGHT/holLow wORlD" single	4:35
11.	"us"	daydream	4:34
12.	"s-AVE"	o1	4:36
13.	"Re: I Am"	Midnight Sun	5:47
14.	"zero"		3:08
Total length:			64:03

Blu-ray / DVD
No.	Title	Length
1.	"Kogoesouna Kisetsu Kara (凍えそうな季節から)" (Music video)
2.	"Stars in the rain" (Music video)
3.	"Brave Shine" (Music video)
4.	"us" (Music video)
5.	"Dare ka, Umi wo (誰か、海を。)" (Music video)
6.	"Nemuri no Mori (眠りの森)" (Music video)
7.	"insane dream" (Music video)
8.	"RE:I AM" (Music video)
9.	"ninelie" (Music video)
10.	"StarRingChild" (Music video)
11.	"s-AVE" (Music video)
12.	"ninelie" (Live from Aimer Hall Tour 2016 @ Tokyo International Forum Hall A on 6 November 2016)
13.	"Cold Sun" (Live from Aimer Hall Tour 2016 @ Tokyo International Forum Hall A on 6 November 2016)

=== Charts ===
Chart (2017)	Peak position
Japanese Hot Albums (Billboard)	4
Japanese Albums (Oricon)	4
South Korean International Albums (Gaon)	5

=== Sales and certifications ===
Region	Certification	Certified units/sales
Japan (RIAJ)	Gold	100,000^{^}
South Korea	—	500
^{^} Shipments figures based on certification alone.
