= Walpurgis (album) =

Studio album by Aimer
- Released: April 14, 2021
- Genre: Pop; rock
- Length: 61:02
- Language: Japanese; English
- Label: Sony Music Entertainment Japan

Aimer chronology
Penny Rain (2019)	Walpurgis (2021)	Deep Down (2022)

Singles from Walpurgis
- 1. "Stand-Alone" Released: May 5, 2019; 2. "Torches" Released: August 14, 2019; 3. "Haru wa Yuku / Marie" Released: March 25, 2020; 4. "Spark-Again" Released: September 9, 2020

Walpurgis is the sixth studio album released by Aimer. It was released on April 14, 2021 in a regular CD only edition and in three versions: a limited CD + BD edition (Type-A), a limited CD + DVD edition (Type-B), and a Limited Edition CD + 3 BD edition. In addition, Walpurgis is Aimer's first album to be available in LP format.

Walpurgis peaked at No. 2 on Oricon's Weekly Album Chart dated April 26, 2021 and hit No. 1 on Billboard Japan's Hot Albums and Top Albums Sales Charts dated April 21, 2021.

== Track listing ==
All lyrics are written by aimerrhythm, except where indicated

Walpurgis track listing
No.	Title	Lyrics	Music	Arrangement	Length
1.	"Walpurgis -prologue-"		Rui Momota	Kenji Tamai; Momota	2:23
2.	"Stand-Alone"		Masahiro Tobinai	Tamai; Tobinai	4:45
3.	"Cold Rain"		Takayuki Mitsuhashi	Tamai; Momota; Koichiro Muroya	3:50
4.	"Trill" (Toriru (トリル))		Tobinai	Tamai; Tobinai	5:20
5.	"Chikyūgi (with Vaundy)" ((地球儀, "Globe"))	Vaundy	Vaundy	Vaundy	3:52
6.	"Spark-Again"		Tobinai	Tamai; Tobinai	4:02
7.	"Wonderland"	Yuki Kajiura	Kajiura	Kajiura	5:03
8.	"Torches"		Tobinai	Tamai; Tobinai	4:54
9.	"Marie"		Hiroaki Yokoyama	Tamai; Momota	5:06
10.	"Ever After"		Momota; Tamai	Tamai; Shunsuke Tsuri	3:56
11.	"Hollow-mas"		Shogo Ohnishi	Tamai; Ohnishi; KOHD	2:52
12.	"Kiro" ((季路, "Seasonal Road"))		Tobinai	Tamai; Tobinai; Muroya	5:52
13.	"Haru wa Yuku" ((春はゆく, "Spring Goes"))	Kajiura	Kajiura	Kajiura	5:05
14.	"Walpurgis"		Momota	Tamai; Momota	4:02
Total length:					61:0

Type-A Blu-ray: Aimer Hall Tour 19/20 "rouge de bleu" Tokyo（2020/02/23）
No.	Title	Length
1.	"Stand-Alone"
2.	"3min"
3.	"Black Bird"
4.	"Brave Shine"
5.	"Daisy"
6.	"Koiwazurai"
7.	"I Beg You"
8.	"One"
9.	"Torches"
10.	"Twoface"
11.	"Sailing"
12.	"Blind to You"
13.	"Polaris"
14.	"AM02:00 - AM03:00 - AM04:00"
15.	"Stand by You"
16.	"We Two"
17.	"Yakō Ressha ~Nothing to Lose~"
18.	"Stand-Alone" (Music video)
19.	"Torches" (Music video)
20.	"Haru wa Yuku" (Music video)
21.	"Spark-Again" (Music video)
22.	"Wonderland" (Music video)
23.	"Chikyūgi (with Vaundy)" (Music video)

Type-B DVD / Limited Edition Blu-ray 3
No.	Title	Length
1.	"Stand-Alone" (Music video)
2.	"Torches" (Music video)
3.	"Haru wa Yuku" (Music video)
4.	"Spark-Again" (Music video)
5.	"Wonderland" (Music video)
6.	"Chikyūgi (with Vaundy)" (Music video)

Limited edition Blu-ray 1: Aimer Hall Tour 19/20 "rouge de bleu" Tokyo ~bleu de rouge~ (2020/02/22)
No.	Title	Length
1.	"Hoshi no Kieta Yoru ni"
2.	"Sailing"
3.	"Blind to You"
4.	"Polaris"
5.	"Yakō Ressha ~Nothing to Lose~"
6.	"AM02:00 - AM03:00 - AM04:00"
7.	"Stand by You"
8.	"We Two"
9.	"Torches"
10.	"Stand-Alone"
11.	"Black Bird"
12.	"I Beg You"
13.	"Daisy"
14.	"Koiwazurai"
15.	"3min"
16.	"Hz (Hertz)"
17.	"One"
18.	"Re: I Am"
19.	"Marie (Encore)"
20.	"Kataomoi (Encore)"
21.	"Rokutōsei no Yoru (Encore)"

Limited edition Blu-ray 2: Aimer Hall Tour 19/20 "rouge de bleu" Tokyo ~rouge de bleu~ (2020/02/23)
No.	Title	Length
1.	"Stand-Alone"
2.	"3min"
3.	"Black Bird"
4.	"Brave Shine"
5.	"Daisy"
6.	"Koiwazurai"
7.	"I Beg You"
8.	"One"
9.	"Torches"
10.	"Twoface"
11.	"Sailing"
12.	"Blind to You"
13.	"Polaris"
14.	"AM02:00 - AM03:00 - AM04:00"
15.	"Stand by You"
16.	"We Two"
17.	"Yakō Ressha ~Nothing to Lose~"
18.	"Marie (Encore)"
19.	"Kataomoi (Encore)"
20.	"April Showers (Encore)"

== Charts ==
Chart performance for Walpurgis
Chart (2021)	Peak position
Japanese Hot Albums (Billboard)	1
Japanese Top Albums Sales (Billboard)	1
Japanese Top Download Albums (Billboard)	1
Japanese Albums (Oricon)	2
