= Aimer Live in Budokan "blanc et noir" =

Video by Aimer
- Released: December 13, 2017
- Recorded: August 29, 2017
- Venue: Nippon Budokan
- Genres: Pop; rock
- Length: 111 minutes
- Languages: Japanese; English
- Label: SME Records
- Producer: Kenji Tamai

Aimer chronology
Aimer Live in Budokan "blanc et noir" (2017)	Aimer Special Concert with Slovak National Radio Symphony Orchestra "ARIA STRINGS" (2018)

Aimer Live in Budokan "blanc et noir" (Aimer Live in 武道館 "blanc et noir") is the first live video album by Japanese singer/songwriter Aimer. Recorded live at the Nippon Budokan on August 29, 2017, the album was released on December 13, 2017 on SME Records in two versions: a limited Blu-ray+CD edition and a regular Blu-ray-only edition. The Blu-ray includes the bonus short film "sólin", which was shot in Iceland.

== Track listing ==
Blu-ray

All lyrics are written by aimerrhythm, except where indicated.

No.	Title	Lyrics	Music	Length
1.	"Twinkle Twinkle Little Star"	Jane Taylor	Taylor	3:01
2.	"Spica" (スピカ)		Masahiro Tobinai	5:19
3.	"Anata ni Deawanakereba ~Kasetsutouka~" (あなたに出会わなければ～夏雪冬花～; If I Hadn't Met You ~Summer Snow, Winter Flowers~)		aimerrhythm	6:06
4.	"Hoshikuzu Venus" (星屑ビーナス; Stardust Venus)		aimerrhythm	4:18
5.	"Re:pray" (5:12)		aimerrhythm
6.	"Kataomoi" (カタオモイ; "Unrequited Love")	Takahito Uchisawa	Uchisawa	3:48
7.	"March of Time"		Ryota Nakano	5:02
8.	"Chouchou Musubi" (蝶々結び; "Butterfly Knot")	Yojiro Noda	Noda	5:29
9.	"us"	TK	TK	4:37
10.	"holLow wORlD"		Tsuyoshi Okamoto; Kenji Tamai	4:49
11.	"LAST STARDUST"		Tobinai	5:19
12.	"Brave Shine"		Hisashi Koyama	4:15
13.	"Hana no Uta" (花の唄; Flower Song)	Yuki Kajiura	Kajiura	6:20
14.	"Re: I Am"	Hiroyuki Sawano	Sawano	6:00
15.	"zero"		Tobinai	3:27
16.	"Stars in the rain"		aimerrhythm; Jamil Kazmi	7:07
17.	"AM02:00"		aimerrhythm	6:42
18.	"One"		aimerrhythm; Rui Momota	6:02
19.	"Rokutousei no Yoru" (六等星の夜; Night of Sixth Magnitude Star)		aimerrhythm	7:40
20.	"Short Film "sólin"" (Bonus Track)			10:23
Total length:				110:56

CD

All lyrics are written by aimerrhythm, except where indicated.

No.	Title	Lyrics	Music	Length
1.	"TWINKLE TWINKLE LITTLE STAR"	Taylor	Taylor	3:02
2.	"Spica" (スピカ)		Tobinai	5:19
3.	"Anata ni Deawanakereba ~Kasetsutouka~" (あなたに出会わなければ～夏雪冬花～; If I Hadn't Met You ~Summer Snow, Winter Flowers~)		aimerrhythm	6:07
4.	"Hoshikuzu Venus" (星屑ビーナス; Stardust Venus)		aimerrhythm	4:18
5.	"Re:pray" (5:11)		aimerrhythm
6.	"Kataomoi" (カタオモイ; "Unrequited Love")	Uchisawa	Uchisawa	3:50
7.	"March of Time"		Nakano	5:02
8.	"Chouchou Musubi" (蝶々結び; "Butterfly Knot")	Noda	Noda	5:28
9.	"us"	TK	TK	4:36
10.	"holLow wORlD"		Okamoto; Tamai	4:49
11.	"LAST STARDUST"		Tobinai	5:24
12.	"Brave Shine"		Hisashi Koyama	4:13
13.	"Re: I Am"	Sawano	Sawano	6:04
14.	"zero"		Tobinai	3:18
15.	"Stars in the rain"		aimerrhythm; Kazmi	5:55
Total length:				72:36

== Charts ==
Weekly charts

Chart (2019)	Peak position
Blu-ray Disc Chart (Oricon)	5
