= Sun Dance (album) =

Studio album by Aimer
- Released: April 10, 2019
- Recorded: Studio Device • Studio Sound Valley • Sound City Studio • Studio A-Tone • Higashi-Azabu Studio • Heart Beat. Recording Studio • Studio GreenBird; Japan
- Genres: Pop; rock
- Length: 39:37
- Languages: Japanese; English
- Label: SME Records
- Producer: Kenji Tamai

Aimer chronology
Best Selection "blanc"/"noir" (2017)	Sun Dance (2019)	Penny Rain (2019)

Singles from Sun Dance
- 1. "ONE" Released: November 11, 2017; 2. "Omoide wa Kirei de" Released: September 5, 2018; 3. "Hanabiratachi no March" Released: January 9, 2019; 4. "Koiwazurai" Released: March 18, 2019

Sun Dance is the first part of the fifth studio album Sun Dance & Penny Rain released by Aimer. It was released on April 10, 2019 in a regular CD only edition and with Penny Rain in three versions: a limited 2 CD + 2 BD + Special Storage Box + Sun Dance Jigsaw Puzzle, a limited 2 CD + BD edition (Type-A), and a limited 2CD + DVD edition (Type-B). Sun Dance and Penny Rain were Aimer's first new studio albums since daydream in 2016. In addition, Sun Dance is Aimer's first album to be solely produced by agehasprings since her 2012 debut album Sleepless Nights.

Sun Dance peaked at #3 behind Penny Rain on Oricon's Weekly Album Chart on April 22, 2019 and charted for 26 weeks.

== Production ==
In February 2018, Aimer thought about a concept for her next album after releasing her single "Ref:rain". She then came up with the concept of "Sun and Rain" and used it for her "soleil et pluie" Hall Tour from October 2018 to January 2019. The development of Sun Dance began with the song "3min", which was first performed live on Aimer's Fan Club Tour in August 2018. In addition, after first performing "ONE" live at her Nippon Budokan show in 2017, she desired to record a more upbeat album in contrast to her darker themed releases.

== Track listing ==
All lyrics by aimerrhythm. All music by Masahiro Tobinai except where indicated. All songs arranged by Kenji Tamai and Masahiro Tobinai except where indicated.

Sun Dance
No.	Title	Music	Arrangement	Length
1.	"soleil"	Rui Momota	Kenji Tamai; Rui Momota	1:59
2.	"ONE"	Rui Momota	Kenji Tamai; Rui Momota	5:28
3.	"We Two"			4:07
4.	"3min"			3:03
5.	"Koiwazurai" (コイワズライ)			3:55
6.	"Hanabiratachi no March" (花びらたちのマーチ; "March of Petals")			3:13
7.	"Omoide wa Kirei de" (思い出は奇麗で; "The Memories Are Beautiful")		Kenji Tamai; Rui Momota	3:29
8.	"Monochrome Syndrome"			4:52
9.	"SUN DANCE"	Rui Momota	Kenji Tamai; Rui Momota	5:28
10.	"ONE -epilogue-"	Rui Momota	Kenji Tamai; Rui Momota	4:03
Total length:				39:37

DVD/Blu-ray 1
No.	Title	Length
1.	"I beg you" (Music Video)	4:52
2.	"Black Bird (Movie ver.)" (Music Video)	3:37
3.	"zero" (Music Video)	3:13
4.	"ONE" (Music Video)	5:38
5.	"Mabayui bakari" (Music Video)	4:18
6.	"Omoide wa Kireide (Father's day edit)" (Music Video)	2:51
7.	"Ref:rain" (Music Video)	4:51
8.	"Hanabiratachi no March" (Music Video)	3:17
9.	"Kachoufugetsu" (Music Video)	5:49
10.	"Hana no Uta" (Music Video)	6:32
Total length:		44:58

Blu-ray 2: Aimer Hall Tour 18/19 "soleil et pluie" Live
No.	Title	Length
1.	"soleil"	1:06
2.	"ONE"	5:43
3.	"Monochrome Syndrome"	4:41
4.	"Believe Be:leave"	5:17
5.	"3min"	3:19
6.	"Anata ni Deawanakereba ~ Natsu Yuki Fuyuka ~"	6:18
7.	"Kyō Kara Omoide (Evergreen ver. )"	5:18
8.	"Kataomoi"	3:53
9.	"Omoide wa Kirei de"	4:33
10.	"Ref:Rain"	5:00
11.	"Mabayui Bakari"	4:25
12.	"Hana no Uta"	6:22
13.	"Black Bird"	3:50
14.	"After Rain -Scarlet ver.-"	5:04
15.	"Hz"	7:03
16.	"Chouchou Musubi"	5:49
Total length:		77:41

== Credits ==
Adapted from Booklet.

=== Production ===
- Kenji Tamai - producer (agehasprings)
- Hideki Morioka – director, organizer (agehasprings)
- Kentaro Kondo – director, organizer (agehasprings)
- Yuji Chinone - mastering engineer (Sony Music Studios Tokyo)

=== Album Staff ===
- Arata Kato – photograph
- Manabu Tsujino – executive producer (Sony Music Labels)
- Yoshichika Matsumoto - executive producer (SME Records)
- Kenji Tamai - executive producer (agehasprings)
- Go Matsuda – art direction & design (quia)
- Hiroaki Sano – supervise (Sony Music Entertainment)
- Megumi Miyai – products coordination (Sony Music Solutions)
- Kazuyo Takeuchi - products coordination (Sony Music Solutions)
- Ryota Torisu – artist management (aspr)
- Mami Fujino – artist management (aspr)
- Moe Hattori - assistant artist management (aspr)
- Toru Takeuchi - A&R in chief (SME Records)
- Mio Uchimura - A&R (SME Records)
- Minaho Takahashi – hair & makeup
- Tsuyoshi Takahashi – styling

== Charts ==
=== Album ===
Weekly charts

Chart (2019)	Peak position
Japanese Hot Albums (Billboard)	1
Japanese Albums (Oricon)	3
South Korean International Albums (Gaon)	66

Year-end charts

Chart (2019)	Peak position
Japanese Hot Albums (Billboard)	54
Japanese Albums (Oricon)	76

=== Singles ===
Title	Year	Peak positions	
Title	Year	JPN Oricon	JPN Billboard
"ONE / Hana no Uta / Rokutosei no Yoru Magic Blue ver."	2017	2	2
