= Fate/Hollow Ataraxia =

2005 Japanese visual novel game

- Cover art featuring the main cast of Fate/Hollow Ataraxia: Caren Ortensia (center), Bazett Fraga McRemitz (left), Rin Tohsaka (right), Sakura Matou (top), Artoria Pendragon (top right)

フェイト/ホロウアタラクシア (Feito/Horō Atarakushia)
- Genre: Dark fantasy
- Video game
- Developer: Type-Moon (Note: Ported to PlayStation Vita by HuneX)
- Publisher: Type-Moon; Kadokawa Shoten (Vita); Aniplex (NS, Steam)
- Genre: Visual novel, Eroge (Note: Only the original 2005 Windows version has adult content)
- Engine: KiriKiri
- Platform: Microsoft Windows; PlayStation Vita; Nintendo Switch
- Released: Microsoft Windows: JP: October 28, 2005; WW: August 7, 2025; PlayStation Vita: JP: November 27, 2014; Nintendo Switch: WW: August 7, 2025
- Manga
- Written by: Medori
- Published by: Kadokawa
- Magazine: Monthly Shounen Ace
- Original run: July 2013 – June 2016
- Volumes: 2

Fate/Hollow Ataraxia (フェイト/ホロウアタラクシア , Feito/Horō Atarakushia) (Note: The word "ataraxia" refers to the Greek term for tranquility, giving the title a combined meaning of "empty (or false) tranquility".) (stylized as Fate/hollow ataraxia) is a Japanese adult visual novel developed by Type-Moon, and released on October 28, 2005 for Windows PCs. Type-Moon released a port for PlayStation Vita without erotic content in 2014. A remastered version of Fate/Hollow Ataraxia was released worldwide for Nintendo Switch and PC in 2025.

The game is a spin-off of Type-Moon's earlier adult game Fate/Stay Night. The story takes place a few months after the events of Fate/Stay Night in Fuyuki City. It follows a time loop imposed on Shirou Emiya and Bazett Fraga McRemitz by the servant Avenger.

Development began between 2004 and 2005 as Japanese author Kinoko Nasu designed a story centered around characters in a time loop, that he felt allowed for daily life scenes, new character interactions, and the reveal of the mystery behind the Holy Grail War. The game was introduced primarily as a fan-disc intended to deliver a more "happier" follow-up to Fate/Stay Night that allowed the characters to coexist peacefully after the "tragic" events of the original visual novel.

The gameplay in Fate/Hollow Ataraxia uses non-linear gameplay which offers different scenarios with courses of interaction. The game was well received based on sales and critics. Critical response to the game's narrative and cast was generally favorable. The game ranked as one of the top selling visual novels for the time of its release. A manga adaptation illustrated by Medori was serialized into two tankōbon volumes from 2013 and 2016 in Kadokawa Shoten's Monthly Shounen Ace magazine.

== Gameplay ==
Fate/Hollow Ataraxia is a visual novel that abandons the traditional linear gameplay and route-based system of Fate/Stay Night and instead has the player experience a recurring four-day time loop in Fuyuki City, through the perspectives of Avenger, Shirou Emiya and Bazett Fraga McRemitz.. The game also features a significantly "lighter" tone than its predecessor, achieving it through its "slice of life" approach. An interactive aerial map of the city allows players to choose specific scenes during morning, noon, and night. Players must investigate the mystery of the loop. For progression, code triggers and progression markers known as flags track your events, story states, and time loops and are retained across loops, allowing the players to gradually unlock new events and eventually resolve the loop. Throughout the game, multiple minigames can be unlocked—including a Hanafuda card game, "Operation Illya's Castle", and a built-in chibi-style tower defense game titled "Capsule Servant" in the PS Vita/Remastered versions—along with extras like the "Eclipse" side stories.

== Plot ==
Fate/Hollow Ataraxia takes place several months after the events of Fate/Stay Night in Fuyuki City. Mages' Association member, Bazett Fraga McRemitz, wakes up with amnesia on the fourth day of the Fifth Holy Grail war alongside her newly assigned servant, Avenger. She and Avenger set off to compete and win the Holy Grail War. A time loop occurs due to the tampering of Rin Tohsaka's Jewel Sword which inadvertently merged all the potential timelines of the Holy Grail War. Tohsaka later embarks on mission to fix things with the Mages' Association in England. Emiya suspects something is wrong when he finds himself repeatedly meeting Caren Ortensia in similar scenarios. He realizes that he and Bazett are in a time loop that began on the fourth day of the Fifth Holy Grail War. Each time either of them die or survive, they are sent back to the first day of the loop.

Avenger is revealed as the catalyst of the corruption of the Holy Grail in the previous Holy Grail war, and the time loop. Having become a weak Grail with the destruction of its physical vessel and his soul separated of Greater Grail in process, his spirit came across a dying Bazett and responded to her wish to live. He created the time loop inside of Bazett's mind and replicated the characters in this dream world, while the real Shirou and his friends are living peacefully in the outside world. After learning the truth from Caren, Avenger and Bazett destroy the Grail to put an end to the loop. Bazett awakens from her coma in the real world and Avenger returns to the void. He revives the participants of the Fifth Holy Grail War who died more than half a year ago, excluding Kotomine Kirei. In the epilogue, Bazett quits the Magic Association and becomes a freelancer.

== Development ==
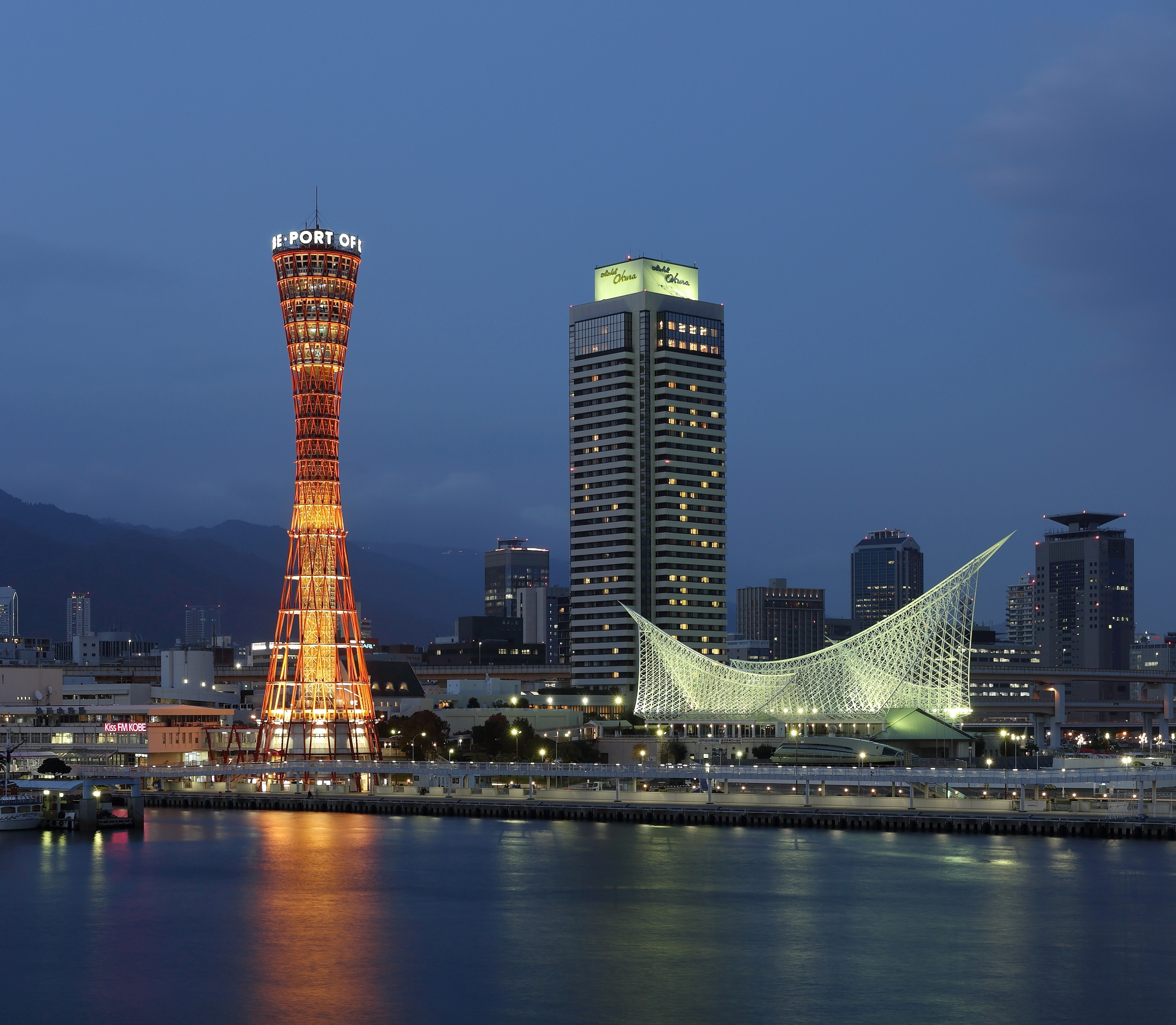
Fuyuki City is inspired by the landscape of Kobe, Hyogo Prefecture, Japan.

After the release of the Fate/Stay Night visual novel, there were no plans for a sequel. As Kinoko Nasu felt Emiya's character arc and the Holy Grail War fully concluded within the three original routes. The concept of Hollow Ataraxia started with Nasu's idea to merge the routes of Fate/Stay Night into a "cohesive" story, inspired by the concept of their previous work, Kagetsu Tohya. It was designed as a fan-disc and pseudo-sequel to Fate/Stay Night. Development for Fate/Hollow Ataraxia began after the release of its predecessor in January 2004. Nasu was responsible for writing the narrative, while Takashi Takeuchi handled the character designer as the art director. For work on the scenario, Nasu contributed alongside sub-writers who aided with daily writing and editing. The sub-writers had included Meteo Hoshizora and several other new scenario writers to Type-Moon—including Aramoto Kei, Hikaru Sakurai, and Morisaki Ryouto. He explained that the time loop was originally six days, but was later dropped to four to avoid "dragging the storyline. Takeuchi stated that some people felt that "[hollow] should include a derivative work to serve as a summary [to] make it popular". While Nasu noted that Hollow Ataraxia's plot had overlapped with the initial story of his mystery visual novel Decoration Disorder Disconnection (DDD). Takeuchi explained that when he first heard about the plan to adapt Fate/hollow atraxia into a manga, he suggested dividing it into two separate works, with one being about daytime, and the other about nighttime.

=== Release history ===
Fate/Hollow Ataraxia was released as an adult game on October 28, 2005, as a limited-edition version, playable on Windows PCs as a DVD, and as a bonus came bundled with the visual novel's original soundtrack. The manufacturing of the original adult version has since then been suspended. An updated all ages version with an enhanced port compatible for the PlayStation Vita was released by Japanese game developers Type-Moon and HuneX on November 27, 2014. Also along with having full-voice acting, an opening video by Japanese animation studio Ufotable, and theme songs by Japanese singer Aimer, the limited edition version was bundled with a collection of art material and a mini-Nendoroid figure of Avenger. In August 2024, a remastered version was announced for release. Type-Moon released Fate/hollow ataraxia Remastered on August 7, 2025 for the Nintendo Switch and Windows PCs.

== Media ==
=== Manga ===
Cover art for the first volume of the Fate/Hollow Ataraxia manga

Several sets of manga anthologies based on Fate/Hollow Ataraxia were produced. Including Fate/Hollow Ataraxia Anthology Comic, released by Ichijinsha on January 7, 2006, under DNA Media Comics; the fifteenth volume in the series was released on August 25, 2008. Two anthology series were then released by Kadokawa, released between January to May 2006. Another two were then released by Enterbrain. Fate/Hollow Ataraxia Anthology Comic was released between January 30, 2006, and May 25, 2007, in nine tankōbon volumes under their Magi-Cu Comics imprint. A yonkoma series was later published by Enterbrain between December 25, 2007, and December 25, 2008, in six volumes. In 2013, a Fate/Hollow Ataraxia manga illustrated by Medori and published by Kadokawa began serializing in the Monthly Shounen Ace magazine.

No.	Japanese release date	Japanese ISBN
1	February 4, 2014	978-4-04-120926-4
2	June 25, 2016	978-4-04-102557-4

=== Music ===
The Fate/Hollow Ataraxia Original Soundtrack, bundled with the original release of Fate/Hollow Ataraxia, was released through Geneon Entertainment on November 23, 2005, bearing the catalog number TMC-1007; it was re-released alongside Fate/stay night Remastered in August 2025. The game's theme song "Hollow" by rhu, was released by Type-Moon on October 28, 2005. Aimer's songs "broKen NIGHT / holLow wORlD," and "Open The Doors" were used as the opening and ending theme songs for Fate/Hollow Ataraxia respectively.

Game themes
Title	Composition	Arrangement	Lyrics	Performance	Type	Peak Oricon chart positions
"Ataraxia"	KATE	James Harris	Kinoko Nasu	rhu (Colorvariation)	Opening theme	—
"hollow"	KATE	James Harris	Keita Haga	rhu (Colorvariation)	Theme Song	—
"Our future"	KATE	NUMBER 201	Keita Haga	rhu (Colorvariation)	Ending theme	—
"broKen NIGHT/holLow wORlD"	Takeo Asami	Kenji Tamai, Shogo Ohnishi	aimerrhythm	Aimer	Opening theme	9
"Open The Doors"	KATE	Kenji Tamai, Shogo Ohnishi	Keita Haga	Aimer	Ending theme	—

== Reception ==
Fate/Hollow Ataraxia was regarded as one of the top selling visual novels of 2005. In Japan, the PlayStation Vita version sold 53,979 copies within its first week, ranking at fourth place amongst all Japanese software sales for the November 24–30, 2014 week of sales charts. By February 2017, the game had sold over 100,000 copies. The Steam release had an estimated over 60,000 players by March 2026.
