= UnChild =

Studio album (Collaboration) by Hiroyuki Sawano and Aimer
- Released: June 25, 2014
- Studio: Studio Sound Valley; Bunkamura Studio; LAB recorders; HeartBeat. Recording Studios
- Genre: Pop
- Length: 53:49
- Label: Defstar Records
- Producer: SawanoHiroyuki[nZk]

Hiroyuki Sawano album chronology
| UnChild (2014) | o1 (2015) |

UnChild is the first collaboration album released between composer Hiroyuki Sawano and Aimer. It was released on June 25, 2014 in a limited and regular CD Only edition. Songs are English covers and rearrangements of various theme songs used in the anime Mobile Suit Gundam Unicorn.

== Track listing ==
All music is composed by Hiroyuki Sawano

| No. | Title | Lyrics | Length |
|---|---|---|---|
| 1. | "UnChild" | | 2:56 |
| 2. | "StarRingChild -English ver.-" | cAnON. | 5:02 |
| 3. | "A LETTER" | mpi | 4:28 |
| 4. | "Destiny" | Benjamin Anderson; mpi | 3:51 |
| 5. | "But still..." | cAnON. | 4:41 |
| 6. | "Just say good bye" | Benjamin Anderson; mpi | 4:55 |
| 7. | "Next 2 U" | cAnON. | 4:05 |
| 8. | "bL∞dy f8" (bLoody fate) | cAnON. | 4:48 |
| 9. | "REMIND YOU" | mpi | 4:54 |
| 10. | "EGO" | mpi | 3:56 |
| 11. | "Because we are tiny in this world" | Benjamin Anderson; mpi | 4:25 |
| 12. | "Re: I Am -English ver.-" | Benjamin Anderson; mpi | 5:48 |
| Total length: | | | 53:49 |
