= Fate/Stay Night: Unlimited Blade Works (TV series) =

2014–2015 anime series directed by Takahiro Miura

- Genre: Dark fantasy
- Based on: Fate/stay night: Unlimited Blade Works route by Type-Moon
- Developed by: Ufotable
- Directed by: Takahiro Miura
- Voices of: Noriaki Sugiyama; Ayako Kawasumi; Kana Ueda; Junichi Suwabe; Jouji Nakata; Mai Kadowaki
- Music by: Hideyuki Fukasawa; Yuki Kajiura (#0–9) (Note: Credited as Guest Composer)
- Country of origin: Japan
- Original language: Japanese
- No. of seasons: 2
- No. of episodes: 26 (Note: Number count total includes "Episode 0") + OVA (list of episodes)

Production
- Producers: Hikaru Kondo; Atsuhiro Iwakami; Takashi Takeuchi
- Cinematography: Yuichi Terao
- Animator: Ufotable
- Editor: Manabu Kamino
- Running time: 23 minutes; 47 minutes (#0–1, 12); 10 minutes (OVA)
- Production companies: Aniplex; Notes Co.; Ufotable

Original release
- Network: Tokyo MX, GTV, GYT, BS11
- Release: October 5, 2014 – June 28, 2015
- Release: October 7, 2015 (OVA)

Fate/stay night: Unlimited Blade Works (Note: Stylized as Fate/stay night [Unlimited Blade Works]) is an anime television series produced by Ufotable. It is based on the visual novel Fate/Stay Night produced by Type-Moon. The narrative is primarily based on the Unlimited Blade Works story route from the visual novel and centers around Shirou Emiya, a high school student and amateur magus living in Fuyuki City, Japan. Shirou is unexpectedly dragged into the Fifth Holy Grail War, a secret magical tournament in which seven participants, known as "Masters", and their "Servants", reincarnated personifications of legendary historical heroes, fight in a battle royale for the Holy Grail, an omnipotent magical chalice that can fulfill any wish or desire for its victor. When Shirou and his Servant Saber are forced to team up with Rin Tohsaka, another Master in the Holy Grail War, Shirou finds himself earning the strong dislike of Rin's mysterious Servant Archer, whose true motivations are unknown.

The concept for a new Unlimited Blade Works anime originated from Ufotable president Hikaru Kondo, who wanted to create a new anime adaptation based on the Fate/stay night visual novel. Although initially many staff members were in disagreement over how to properly adapt the novel due to its three routes, it was eventually decided that the Unlimited Blade Works route would be adapted. In creating the series, Ufotable wanted to further explore the protagonist's conflicts with Archer while also providing new scenes not featured in the original visual novel. The series was first announced in early 2014. Its 26 episodes were split into two seasons that aired from October 5 to December 28, 2014, and April 5 to June 28, 2015, respectively. It was released Blu-ray and DVD in both Japanese and English speaking territories in 2015.

Unlimited Blade Works was one of the most anticipated anime of the end of 2014, following from the general popularity of the Fate franchise and the success of Ufotable's previous adaptation of Fate/Zero. Upon release, it received highly positive reviews from critics, who directed particular praise towards the writing of Shirou and other characters as well as the visually striking animation. It was a major commercial success in Japan, having multiple top-selling home media releases and being the winner of multiple awards from the magazine Newtype.

== Plot ==
The story revolves around Shirou Emiya, a hardworking and honest teenager who unwillingly enters the fifth iteration of a to-the-death battle royale called the Holy Grail War, where combatants fight with magic and Heroes throughout history for a chance to have their wishes granted. Orphaned and the sole survivor of a massive fire in Fuyuki City as a child, Shirou was taken in by a retired magus named Kiritsugu Emiya, who died some years later. Shirou's feelings of responsibility for those who died and his own salvation through his father formed a strong desire for justice and peace in him. Thus, he earnestly trains his body and minuscule ability with magic with the goal of helping others, even if people often abuse his generosity. One evening, Shirou unexpectedly comes across two warriors, Archer and Lancer, fighting at his school. He is attacked and nearly killed by Lancer, but Archer's master, Rin Tohsaka, manages to revive him just before death. However, Lancer attacks again, and just before Shirou is about to be killed, he accidentally summons his Servant, Saber, who saves his life. With this summoning, the marks of the Command Seal appear on Shirou's hand, formalizing his entry as a Master into the Holy Grail War.

As Saber forces Lancer to flee, she engages in combat with Archer, but Shirou accidentally stops her with his magic upon seeing Rin, his schoolmate. Shirou and Rin decide to form an alliance to fight against other mages. Through the priest Kirei Kotomine, Shirou learns about the Holy Grail War's context. Although initially hesitant, he decides to participate to avoid future catastrophes happening as a result of wishes granted by the Holy Grail.

As the war continues, Shirou starts developing his own skills as a magus by imitating Archer's abilities, and Rin notes striking similarities between the two. However, in a battle against the servant Caster in an attempt to rescue his guardian Fujimura, Shirou loses control of Saber, who is imprisoned by Caster. Shirou vows to fight with his own magical strength to stop the war and save his friends. Archer betrays Rin during a fight against Caster, but Rin reforms her alliance with Shirou. With Lancer's help, the duo manages to free Saber from Caster who is then killed.

To gain more allies, Rin and Shirou decide to team up with Illyasviel von Einzbern and her servant Berserker. However, Gilgamesh, Kotomine's former servant, arrives and kills both Illya and Berserker before Rin and Shirou can stop him. At Illya's villa, Archer challenges Shirou to a fight, hoping to destroy Shirou's goals of being a hero. Confused, Saber demands to know what his true intentions are, and Archer reveals himself to be a version of Shirou from the future, who became a heroic spirit after becoming disillusioned with the path he took. However, Shirou accepts his future regardless of Archer's regrets, deciding to stick to Kiritsugu's ideals of being a hero. Gilgamesh tries to kill Archer and Shirou, but the former sacrifices himself to protect the latter. Gilgamesh takes Illya's heart, planning to use his other master Shinji Matou in order to summon the corrupted Holy Grail. In order to follow Archer's hopes, Rin passes Shirou her mana to fight Gilgamesh to replicate Archer's powers. As Shirou nearly kills Gilgamesh, Archer uses the last of his strength to deliver the final attack at their enemy while assisting Saber in destroying the Holy Grail. With the war concluded and the servants gone, Shirou and Rin move to London to learn more about magic, and Shirou vows once again to retain Kiritsugu's ideals.

In a post-credits scene, Archer appears in another dimension, and disappears as he remembers his past self's words, just as another, younger, hooded person appears in the same field.

== Production ==
Shirou Emiya designed by Tomonori Sudo in the Unlimited Blade Works artbook

In 2011, Type-Moon ported Fate/stay night to the PlayStation Vita. Type-Moon intended to include animated cut scenes for each of the routes for the port. Studio ufotable was tasked to animate the cut scenes. During production, Ufotable president Hikaru Kondo had an idea about the possibility of creating a full anime series that would be an adaptation of the visual novel. At the time, Studio Deen had already created two works based on the visual novel, including a 2006 animated series largely based on the 'Fate' route, and a 2010 movie based on the Unlimited Blade Works route. Kondo proposed the idea to Type-Moon CEO Takashi Takeuchi, and it was approved.

The original visual novel includes three routes: 'Fate', 'Unlimited Blade Works' and 'Heaven's Feel,' which start with similar premises but gradually become unique stories, and are distinguished by their focus on different main female characters - Saber, Rin and Sakura, respectively. The Ufotable production committee had differing opinions regarding the development of the new anime series. Some favored the idea of following the source material down to the last detail, while others, such as Hikaru Kondo and Takashi Takeuchi, wanted to re-adapt the 'Fate' route to emphasize Saber's character traits that were displayed in Fate/Zero. However, this idea was not met with unanimous approval with the rest of the production committee. As a result, the idea was scrapped, with consensus that the 'Fate' route already animated by Studio Deen would serve as an introduction to the setting of the 'Fate' universe.

Producer Atsuhiro Iwakami proposed that an adaptation of the Unlimited Blade Works route would be a logical continuation to the events of Fate/Zero. Iwakami was certain that the plot of this route would be better presented as a TV series rather than a full-length film. Ufotable said that they wished to develop the series in a dark tone similar to Fate/Zero with Shirou Emiya's characterization also being altered from the original visual novel. As a result, Miura pointed out that in future work he would prefer to focus more on revealing the character of Shirou as a character through his personal traits, rather through women associated with him, in contrast to the visual novel. The CEO of Type-Moon believed that only Nasu himself was able to convey all the ideas he put into Shirou, and help them reflect on the screen correctly and deepen public perception of the hero. Another character that Miura requested Kinoko Nasu to expand was Illya, who received development in the second half of the series when she learns of her father's past and is driven by angst as a result.

The characters were designed by Tomonori Sudo, who was handed materials and key animation to review in preparation for his work. Being a Type-Moon fan, he was conflicted on how best to depict each character's expression, but worked with the screen and animation directors in order to create the best possible product. Sudo stated that he was satisfied with the battle choreography and animation throughout the television series.

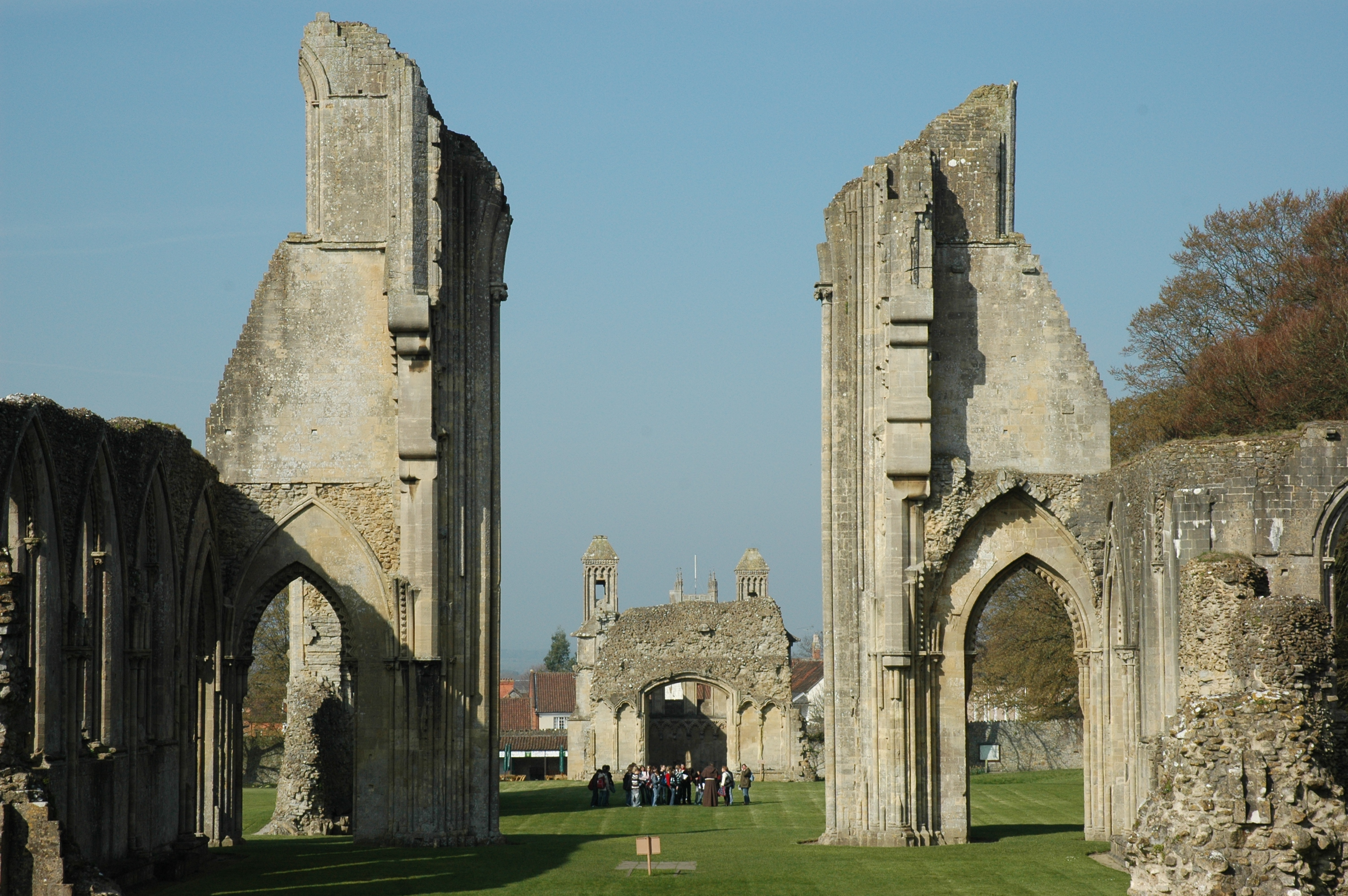
The Glastonbury Abbey ruins were seen in the epilogue of the series. King Arthur's grave is visible in the center.

=== Voice actors ===
All the Japanese voice actors from the Studio Deen adaptation of Fate/stay night reprised their roles. In contrast, the English dub recast almost all the voice actors save for Mela Lee as Rin Tohsaka, Stephanie Sheh as Illyasviel von Einzbern, Tony Oliver as Lancer and Julie Ann Taylor as Taiga Fujimura, respectively; most notably, the roles of Shirou, Saber and Archer were recast to Bryce Papenbrook, Kari Wahlgren and Kaiji Tang, respectively. Papenbrook felt that the story took a "different path in Unlimited Blade Works" and that the creators "wanted a different take on Shirou". He noted that he was told to play Shirou in a "real" way, and had to get himself into a "deep mindset" in order to play the role best.

Noriaki Sugiyama stated that he was tense before he started recording for Unlimited Blade Works, since he had not been involved in the mainstream Fate series since 2010. Sugiyama expressed concern that voicing Shirou in comedic spinoffs like Fate/kaleid liner Prisma Illya and Carnival Phantasm would affect his performance for Unlimited Blade Works. Ayako Kawasumi, Saber's seiyuu, noted that the characterization of her role differed in Unlimited Blade Works from the Fate route, due to her character's lack of romantic feelings for Shirou in the route. Consequently, Saber was portrayed with a more stoic demeanor, seeing Shirou as merely her Master and not a romantic interest.

=== Music ===
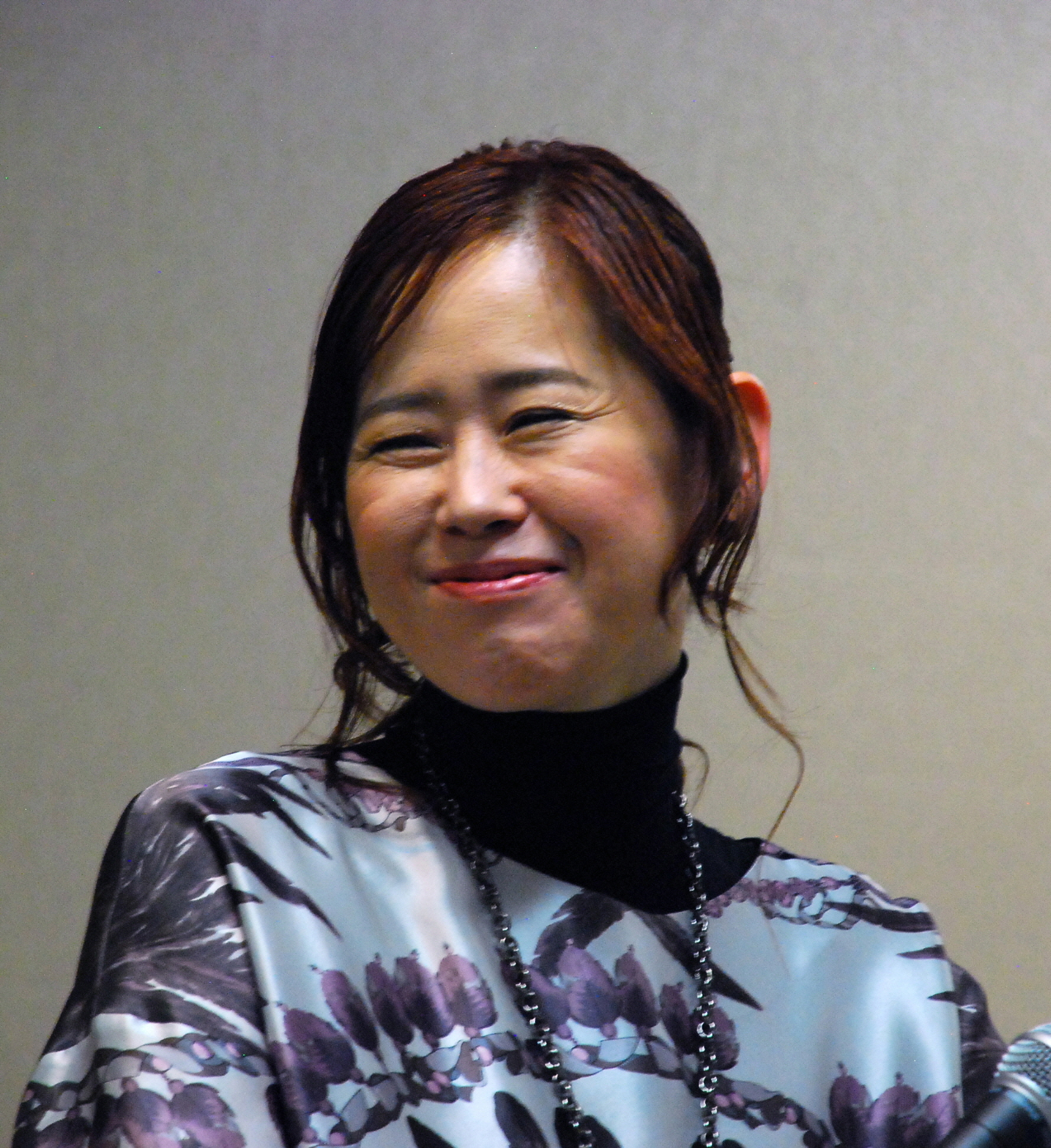
Composer Yuki Kajiura

Fate/stay night [Unlimited Blade Works] Original Soundtrack I was composed, arranged and produced by Hideyuki Fukasawa, with additional tracks by Number 201 and Yuki Kajiura. The first season opening theme song is "Ideal White" performed by Mashiro Ayano, while the ending theme song is "Believe" performed by Kalafina. The second season the opening theme song is "Brave Shine" performed by Aimer, while the ending theme song is "Ring Your Bell" performed by Kalafina. A remix of "Ring Your Bell", titled "Ring Your Bell (in the silence)", was used as the ending theme for episode 15. The song "Last Stardust", performed by Aimer, was used as an insert song for episode 20. LiSA performed a new cover of "This Illusion", a returning theme from the 2006 series, which was used throughout the series. The album was first released in Japan on March 25, 2015, by Aniplex, a subsidiary of Sony Music Entertainment (Japan), with catalog number ANZX-11636, and was re-released as part of the North American Limited Edition Blu-Ray box set on August 25, 2015.

Originally, the series' second opening theme was intended to be "Last Stardust", composed by Aimer. However, the staff did not find it fitting for the video's sequences and instead used "Brave Shine". Writer Kinoko Nasu decided to use "Last Stardust" for the Heaven's Feel route, but the Unlimited Blade Works staff instead used it as an insert song in episode 20 during Shirou's fight with Archer. The vocals focus on the fire that destroyed Shirou's city and deal with his acceptance of Kiritsugu's death as he decided to follow his dreams regardless of any regrets he may have in his life. Aimer also took inspiration from the relationship between Jesus and his disciple Judas Iscariot in developing the relationship between Shirou and Archer, with the latter often showing intentions to kill the former, believing he should have never been born; similar words were said between Jesus and Judas.

There were more than 400 compositions created for the entire Unlimited Blade Works soundtrack. This significantly exceeded the average figure for a 24 episode anime series, which normally range around 40-50 tracks. As a retrospective scene accompaniment, two revised compositions by Yuki Kajiura from the Fate/Zero series were used.

==== Original Soundtrack I ====
Fate/stay night [Unlimited Blade Works] Original Soundtrack I

Soundtrack album by Hideyuki Fukasawa
- Released: March 25, 2015 (Japan); August 25, 2015 (North America)
- Recorded: 2015
- Genre: Soundtrack
- Length: 73:25
- Label: Sony Music Publishing (Japan) Inc.
- Producers: Hideyuki Fukasawa; Number 201 (track 25); Yuki Kajiura (tracks 26 & 27)

No.	Title	Length
1.	"Unlimited Blade Works"	5:30
2.	"Rin:Remembrance～召喚"	2:35
3.	"Archer"	3:11
4.	"Shirou:赤い記憶～Invocation"	2:01
5.	"Face to Face"	1:01
6.	"Souls to Fight"	3:39
7.	"Storm"	1:18
8.	"Vortex of Fate"	4:29
9.	"Rin's Melody"	1:04
10.	"Daydream"	1:45
11.	"A Sword, No Words"	1:52
12.	"Purple Shade"	2:19
13.	"Into the Battles"	1:26
14.	"Arrow"	0:33
15.	"Rin:my wish"	1:00
16.	"Two Hearts"	1:51
17.	"Reason to Kill"	1:25
18.	"Fist of desperate～Awakening"	4:27
19.	"Dark Glow"	2:53
20.	"Unacceptable"	1:56
21.	"Rule Breaker"	3:43
22.	"Shirou:Nowhere to go"	2:03
23.	"Each Choices, Each Steps"	5:39
24.	"Far Away from You"	2:11
25.	"This Illusion" (Season 1 Ending Theme. Vocal by LiSA.)	4:04
26.	"Count it from zero" (Produced by Yuki Kajiura)	4:34
27.	"Down in the zero" (Produced by Yuki Kajiura)	4:56
Total length:		73:25

== Release ==
Cover art for the first season DVD of the Unlimited Blade Works TV series.

The series was first announced in early 2014, and official announcements about its cast and storyline were made in July 2014. The anime was jointly produced by Aniplex, Notes Co., Ltd., and Ufotable, the same studios that co-produced the 2011–2012 anime adaptation of Fate/Zero. It was directed by Takahiro Miura, with music composed by Hideyuki Fukasawa; characters designed by Tomonori Sudō, Hisayuki Tabata, and Atsushi Ikariya, based on the original designs by Takashi Takeuchi; and art, 3D, and photography directions by Koji Eto, Kōjirō Shishido, and Yuichi Terao, respectively. The first season ran from October 5 to December 28, 2014, while the second season ran from April 5 to June 28, 2015. An advanced screening online premiered on September 28, 2014, in several countries across the world, including Japan, the United States, France, Germany and South Korea. In Japan, the series was collected in a total of eleven DVD volumes, which were released from November 26, 2014, to September 30, 2015. Two compilation Blu-ray disks were also released. The first disk containing the first season was released on March 25, 2015. The second disk was released on October 7, 2015.

Aniplex of America acquired streaming and home video rights to the 2014 series for North America. They released an English dub for the first half of the series on DVD and limited Blu-ray Disc on August 25, 2015. A ten-minute original video animation episode, titled Sunny Day, was included with the Blu-ray release for the second half of the series, which was released on October 7, 2015. The episode was based on an alternate ending from the visual novel.

To promote the anime, Shirou, Saber, Rin and Archer were added to the video game Summons Board. Crossover game The Alchemist Code was used to promote the anime as well.

== Reception ==
Unlimited Blade Works received positive reviews from critics, who praised the way Ufotable handled the main characters. Critics also applauded the animation quality of the series. Kotaku reviewer Richard Eysenbeys called it "the most beautiful-looking television anime series [he had] ever seen," noting that the smooth transitions between individual frames and the chosen range of colors created a cinematic effect that he considered to be superior to average anime and even previous works produced by Ufotable. In addition to this, Nick Creamer from Anime News Network highlighted the computer generated special effects, which he felt improved the overall quality of the visuals.

Chris Beveridge of The Fandom Post enjoyed Shirou's characterization in the series, especially in regards to his contrasting ideals with Archer and Kiritsugu. Japanator found Shirou's decision to become a tragic warrior as uncommon in storytelling, showing depth in the character. They further stated that Archer's betrayal of Rin was an emotional plot twist, due to the duo's contract and bond in the previous episodes. Seb Reid praised the television series, stating that he felt it was superior to the 2006 Studio Deen adaptation due to Rin's and Archer's larger roles in the series. He felt they were the best characters from the series. Beveridge shares similar sentiments with Reid; he also found Rin more appealing than Saber due to the former's role in the series' finale. Thrillist named the series one of the best anime of the 2010s, with praise on the warriors portrayed in the Holy Grail as well as Shirou's characterization.

The series' epilogue added a new scene where a person with a striking resemblance with Shirou is seen walking in Archer's dimension. This generated many questions from fans in regards to Shirou's destiny. However, Fate visual novel author Kinoko Nasu remained ambiguous regarding whether that person was Shirou or not.

The series has also been commercially successful in Japan. The first Blu-ray sold 33,876 units, topping charts. By March 2015, the Fate franchise became the #1 franchise in collective CD, book, and video sales. 76,222 Blu-ray volumes in Japan by the end of 2015. In the same year, the series also won the "Best Work" award on the Newtype magazine. Theme song "Brave Shine" won Best Theme Song award on the magazine, while the general soundtrack was second behind Aldnoah.Zero. Takahiro Miura was also awarded as Best Director while the character designers were ranked third. Aimer's single "Brave Shine" appeared in the fourth spot of both Oricon and Billboard Japan Hot 100's charts.
