= Penny Rain =

Studio album by Aimer
- Released: April 10, 2019
- Studio: Studio Device • Studio Sound Valley • Sound City Studio • Studio A-Tone • Higashi-Azabu Studio • Sign Studio; Japan; Power Station at BerkleeNYC; United States
- Genre: Pop; rock
- Length: 46:45
- Language: Japanese; English
- Label: SME Records
- Producer: Aimer; Yuki Kajiura; Kenji Tamai; TK; Hiroyuki Sawano

Aimer chronology
Sun Dance (2019)	Penny Rain (2019)	Walpurgis (2021)

Singles from Penny Rain
- 1. "Hana no Uta" Released: November 11, 2017; 2. "Ref:rain" Released: February 21, 2018; 3. "Mabayui bakari" Released: February 21, 2018; 4. "Black Bird" Released: September 5, 2018; 5. "I beg you" Released: January 9, 2019; 6. "Sailing" Released: January 9, 2019

Penny Rain is the second part of the fifth studio album Sun Dance & Penny Rain released by Aimer. It was released on April 10, 2019, in a regular CD only edition and with Sun Dance in three versions: a limited 2 CD + 2 BD + Special Storage Box + Sun Dance Jigsaw Puzzle, a limited 2 CD + BD edition (Type-A), and a limited 2CD + DVD edition (Type-B). Sun Dance and Penny Rain were Aimer's first new studio albums since daydream in 2016.

Penny Rain peaked at #2 ahead of Sun Dance on Oricon's Weekly Album Chart on April 22, 2019, and charted for 26 weeks.

== Production ==
In February 2018, Aimer thought about a concept for her next album after releasing her single "Ref:rain". She then came up with the concept of "Sun and Rain" and used it for her "soleil et pluie" Hall Tour from October 2018 to January 2019. In contrast to the lively and up-tempo themes of Sun Dance, Penny Rain features darker themed tones and more ballads, with the lead track "I beg you" incorporating a Middle Eastern rhythm. The album also features collaborations with Yuki Kajiura, Cocco, TK, and Hiroyuki Sawano.

== Track listing ==
Penny Rain
No.	Title	Lyrics	Music	Arrangement	Length
1.	"pluie"		Yuki Kajiura	Yuki Kajiura	1:59
2.	"I beg you"	Yuki Kajiura	Yuki Kajiura	Yuki Kajiura	4:27
3.	"Black Bird"	aimerrhythm	Masahiro Tobinai	Kenji Tamai; Rui Momota	3:47
4.	"Sailing"	aimerrhythm	Masahiro Tobinai	Kenji Tamai; Masahiro Tobinai	5:35
5.	"Mabayui Bakari" (眩いばかり; "Just Dazzling")	Cocco	Cocco	Kenji Tamai; Masahiro Tobinai	4:11
6.	"Stand By You"	TK	TK	TK	4:14
7.	"Ref:rain"	aimerrhythm	Masahiro Tobinai	Kenji Tamai; Masahiro Tobinai	4:49
8.	"i-mage <in/AR>"	Hiroyuki Sawano	Hiroyuki Sawano	Hiroyuki Sawano	5:49
9.	"Hana no Uta" (花の唄; "Flower Song")	Yuki Kajiura	Yuki Kajiura	Yuki Kajiura	6:11
10.	"April Showers"	aimerrhythm	Albato Luce	Kenji Tamai; Rui Momota	5:43
Total length:					39:37

DVD/Blu-ray 1
No.	Title	Length
1.	"I beg you" (Music Video)	4:52
2.	"Black Bird (Movie ver.)" (Music Video)	3:37
3.	"zero" (Music Video)	3:13
4.	"ONE" (Music Video)	5:38
5.	"Mabayui bakari" (Music Video)	4:18
6.	"Omoide wa Kireide (Father's day edit)" (Music Video)	2:51
7.	"Ref:rain" (Music Video)	4:51
8.	"Hanabiratachi no March" (Music Video)	3:17
9.	"Kachoufugetsu" (Music Video)	5:49
10.	"Hana no Uta" (Music Video)	6:32
Total length:		44:58

Blu-ray 2: Aimer Hall Tour 18/19 "soleil et pluie" Live
No.	Title	Length
1.	"soleil"	1:06
2.	"ONE"	5:43
3.	"Monochrome Syndrome"	4:41
4.	"Believe Be:leave"	5:17
5.	"3min"	3:19
6.	"Anata ni Deawanakereba ~ Natsu Yuki Fuyuka ~"	6:18
7.	"Kyō Kara Omoide (Evergreen ver. )"	5:18
8.	"Kataomoi"	3:53
9.	"Omoide wa Kirei de"	4:33
10.	"Ref:Rain"	5:00
11.	"Mabayui Bakari"	4:25
12.	"Hana no Uta"	6:22
13.	"Black Bird"	3:50
14.	"After Rain -Scarlet ver.-"	5:04
15.	"Hz"	7:03
16.	"Chouchou Musubi"	5:49
Total length:		77:41

== Personnel ==
Credits are adapted from the album's liner notes.

- Yuki Kajiura - producer (tracks 1,2,9), keyboards (tracks 1,2,9), programming (tracks 1,2,9), lyrics (tracks 2, 9), music (tracks 1,2,9), arranger (tracks 1,2,9),
- Yasunori Mori - director (tracks 1, 2, 9)
- Takashi Koiwa - recording (tracks 1, 2, 9), mixing engineer (tracks 1,2, 9), Pro Tools operator (tracks 1,2 9)
- KIYO KIDO STRINGS - strings (tracks 1, 9)
- Koichi Korenaga - guitar (tracks 2, 9)
- Kyoichi Sato - drums (tracks 2, 9)
- Tomoharu “Jr. Takahashi - bass (tracks 2, 9)
- aimerrhythm - lyrics (tracks 3, 4, 7, 10)
- Masahiro Tobinai - music (tracks 3, 4, 7), arranger, (tracks 4, 5, 7) programming (tracks 4, 5, 7), all instruments (tracks 4, 5, 7)
- Kenji Tamai - arranger (tracks 3–5, 7, 10), producer (tracks 3–5, 7, 10), executive producer
- Rui Momota - arranger (tracks 3, 10), programming, (tracks 3, 10), all instruments (tracks 3, 10)
- Masaki Mori - recording (tracks 3, 4, 5, 7, 10)
- Satoshi Kumasaka - mixing (tracks 3–5, 7)
- Hideki Morioka - director (tracks 3–5, 7, 10), organizer (tracks 3–5, 7, 10)
- Kentaro Kondo - director (tracks 3–5, 7, 10), organizer (tracks 3–5, 7, 10)
- Cocco - lyrics (5), music (track 5)
- TK - lyrics(6), music (track 6), arranger (track 6), producer (track 6), recording (track 6), guitar(track 6), chorus (track 6)
- Tohru Takayama - recording (track 6), mixing (track 6)
- Shoichiro Ishii - recording (track 6)
- Matthew Soares - recording assistant (track 6)
- Seigen Tokuzawa - string arrangement (track 6)
- Bobo - drums (track 6)
- Hiroo Yamaguichi - bass (track 6)
- Honoka Sato - 1st Violin (track 6)
- Yoko Fujinawa - 1st Violin (track 6)
- Ayaka Jomoto - 1st Violin (track 6)
- Natsue Kameda - 2nd Violin (track 6)
- Matsuri Mikuni - 2nd Violin (track 6)
- Hiroyuki Sawano - lyrics (track 8), music (track 8), arranger (track 8), producer (track 8), piano (track 8), keyboard (track 8), all instruments (track 8)
- Mitsunori Aizawa - recording (track 8), mixing engineer (track 8) Pro Tools operator (track 8)
- Ken Higeshiro - drums (track 8)
- Toshino Tanabe - bass (track 8)
- Hiroshi Iimuro - guitars (track 8)
- Harutoshi Ito - guitars (track 8)
- AlbatoLuce - music (track 10)
- Hitoshi Konno - strings (track 10)
- Kazuyuki Doki - musician coordinator (track 10)
- Yuji Chinone - mastering engineer (tracks 1–5, 7–10)
- Joe LaPorta - mastering engineer (track 6)
- Toru Takeuchi - A&R in chief
- Mio Uchimura - A&R
- Yu Tsuzuki - sales promotion
- Shomaru Tada - sales promotion
- Yuki Terae - sales promotion
- Megumi Miyai - products coordination
- Kazuyo Takeuchi - products coordination
- Go Matsuda - art direction, design
- Arata Kato - photograph
- Yuuka Akaishi - styling
- Aya Murakami - hair & make-up
- Ryota Torisu - artist management
- Mami Fujino - artist management
- Moe Hattori - assistant artist management
- Hiroaki Sano - supervise
- Manabu Tsujino - executive producer
- Yoshichika Matsumoto - executive producer

== Charts ==
=== Album ===
Weekly charts

Chart (2019)	Peak position
Japanese Hot Albums (Billboard)	3
Japanese Albums (Oricon)	2
South Korean International Albums (Gaon)	67

Year-end charts

Chart (2019)	Peak position
Japanese Hot Albums (Billboard)	56
Japanese Albums (Oricon)	76

=== Singles ===
Title	Year	Peak positions	
Title	Year	JPN Oricon	JPN Billboard
"Ref:rain / Mabayui bakari"	2018	6	6
"Black Bird / Tiny Dancers / Omoide wa Kireide"	2018	5	3
"I beg you / Hanabiratachi no March / Sailing"	2019	1	2

== Awards and nominations ==
Year	Award	Category	Work/Nominee	Result
2018	Newtype Anime Awards	Best Theme Song	"Hana no Uta" (from anime film Fate/stay night: Heaven's Feel I. presage flower)	4th place
2019	Newtype Anime Awards	Best Theme Song	"I beg you" (from anime film Fate/stay night: Heaven's Feel II. lost butterfly)	5th place
