= Midnight Sun (Aimer album) =

Studio album by Aimer
- Released: June 25, 2014
- Studio: Bunkamura Studio; LAB Recorders; Splash Sound Studio; Prime Sound Studio Form; Sound Valley Studio; Studio Device
- Length: 62:00
- Label: Defstar
- Producer: Kenji Tamai; Hiroyuki Sawano; Give Me Wallets; Genki Rockets

Aimer chronology
Sleepless Nights (2012)	Midnight Sun (2014)	DAWN (2015)

Singles from Midnight Sun
- 1. "Re: I Am" Released: March 20, 2013; 2. "Nemuri no Mori" Released: August 14, 2013; 3. "StarRingChild" Released: May 21, 2014

Midnight Sun is the second studio album by Aimer, released in 2014 under the Defstar Records label. It was released in two versions: a limited CD+DVD edition and a regular CD-only edition. The album reached number nine in its first week on the Oricon Albums Chart; it charted for a total of 16 weeks and sold more than 19,000 copies.

== Track listing ==
Midnight Sun track listing
No.	Title	Lyrics	Music	Arrangement	Length
1.	"When You Wish Upon a Star" (prologue)	Ned Washington	Leigh Harline	Kenji Tamai; Shunsuke Tsuri	1:14
2.	"Nemuri no Mori" (眠りの森; Forest of Sleep)	aimerrhythm	Masahiro Tobinai	Kenji Tamai; Masahiro Tobinai	4:33
3.	"7gatsu no Tsubasa" (7月の翼; Wings of July)	aimerrhythm	Rui Momota	Kenji Tamai; Shunsuke Tsuri	4:44
4.	"Words"	Mao Abe	Mao Abe	Kenji Tamai; Rui Momota	5:57
5.	"Cold Sun"	aimerrhythm	Hiroaki Yokoyama	Kenji Tamai; Shogo Ohnishi	5:09
6.	"AM03:00"	aimerrhythm	give me wallets	MAURA	5:59
7.	"Chiisana Hoshi no Melody" (小さな星のメロディー; Melody of Little Star)	aimerrhythm	Noriki Ijiri	Kenji Tamai; Kengo Minamida	5:11
8.	"Voice"	aimerrhythm	Masahiro Tobinai	Kenji Tamai; Masahiro Tobinai	4:47
9.	"Re: I Am"	Hiroyuki Sawano	Hiroyuki Sawano	Hiroyuki Sawano	5:45
10.	"StarRingChild"	Hiroyuki Sawano	Hiroyuki Sawano	Hiroyuki Sawano	5:28
11.	"Hoshi no Kieta Yoru ni (Re-echoed by Genki Rockets × give me wallets)" (星の消えた夜に; On the Night the Stars Disappeared)	aimerrhythm	Masahiro Tobinai	Genki Rockets; give me wallets	5:50
12.	"Iris"	aimerrhythm	Masahiro Tobinai	Kenji Tamai; Kousuke Noma	5:01
13.	"When You Wish Upon a Star"	Ned Washington	Leigh Harline	Kenji Tamai; Shunsuke Tsuri	2:22
Total length:					62:00

DVD listing
No.	Title	Length
1.	"Kyou kara Omoide" (music video)
2.	"Nemuri no Mori" (music video)
3.	"Polaris" (music video)
4.	"Re: I Am" (Live ver. from LisAni! LIVE-4@Budoukan)

== Charts ==
Chart performance for Midnight Sun
Chart (2014)	Peak position
Japanese Albums (Oricon)	9
