= StarRingChild =

Single by SawanoHiroyuki[nZk]:Aimer

from the album Midnight Sun
- Language: Japanese
- B-side: "Even Heaven / Mine"
- Released: May 21, 2014
- Studio: LAB Recorders; Studio Sound Valley; Studio Device; Tune Studio
- Genre: J-pop; rock
- Length: 34:57
- Label: Defstar Records
- Songwriter: Hiroyuki Sawano
- Producers: Hiroyuki Sawano; Kenji Tamai

SawanoHiroyuki[nZk]:Aimer singles chronology
"Re: I Am" (2013)	"StarRingChild" (2014)	"Broken Night" (2014)

Music video
- StarRingChild on YouTube

"StarRingChild" is the sixth single by Japanese singer Aimer, released on May 21, 2014 under Defstar Records. Written by Hiroyuki Sawano, the song was used as the theme song of episode 7 of the mecha anime OVA series Mobile Suit Gundam Unicorn and the ending theme of episode 22 of the OVA's TV edit version Mobile Suit Gundam Unicorn RE:0096. The single peaked at No. 3 on Oricon's singles charts and No. 17 on Billboard Japan's Hot 100.

In an interview, Aimer said the song is about one's struggle from childhood to maturity. Prior to recording the song, she watched previous Gundam titles to fully understand the world of the franchise.

The song was written in English by cAnON. and re-recorded by Aimer in the 2014 SawanoHiroyuki[nZk]:Aimer collaboration album UnChild.

== Track listing ==
=== CD ===
No.	Title	Lyrics	Music	Arrangement	Length
1.	"StarRingChild"	Hiroyuki Sawano	Sawano	Sawano	5:27
2.	"Even Heaven"	aimerrhythm	Shinsuke Tsuri; Kenji Tamai	Tsuri; Tamai	7:38
3.	"Mine"	aimerrhythm	Chikara Morimoto	Tamai; Shogo Ohnishi	5:06
4.	"StarRingChild (Movie Ver.)"	Sawano	Sawano	Sawano	3:25
5.	"StarRingChild (Instrumental)"	Sawano	Sawano	Sawano	5:27
6.	"Even Heaven (Instrumental)"	aimerrhythm	Tsuri; Tamai	Tsuri; Tamai	7:38

=== DVD ===
- "StarRingChild" (Music video) - 5:25

== Music video ==
The music video takes place in a post-apocalyptic wasteland, where a trio of children roam around the ruins of a city and pick up old toys and photographs. They discover a glowing white orb before climbing one of the skyscrapers to watch the sun rise.

== Charts ==
Chart (2014)	Peak position
Japanese Oricon Singles Chart	3
Billboard Japan Hot 100	17
Billboard Japan Top Singles Sales	4
Billboard Japan Hot Animation	5
