= Aimer =

Japanese singer

Aimer エメ
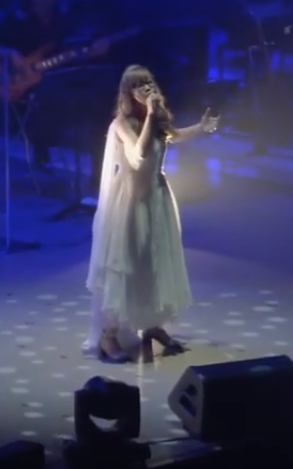
- Aimer performing the song "StarRingChild" in a concert with composer Hiroyuki Sawano in 2015

Background information
- Also known as: aimerrhythm
- Genres: J-pop; jazz; pop rock
- Occupations: Singer; lyricist
- Instruments: Vocals; piano
- Years active: 2011–present
- Labels: Defstar Records (2011–2015); SME Records (2016–2021); Sacra Music (2021–present)
- Spouse: Masahiro Tobinai (m. 2023)
- Website: www.aimer-web.jp

Aimer (エメ, Eme; [eme]) is a Japanese pop singer and lyricist signed to Sacra Music and managed by Agehasprings. Her stage name comes from the French verb aimer 'to love'. Aimer uses the name aimerrhythm for lyrics credits.

Debuting in 2011, she has released seven studio albums, all of which made it into the top 20 of the Oricon Albums Chart, with fourth album Daydream being certified Gold by the Recording Industry Association of Japan. Her 2021 song "Zankyōsanka" became her first song to reach the top of the Japan Hot 100 chart, selling 87,649 downloads in its first week. It also charted at number 37 on the Billboard Global 200, marking her first appearance on the chart.

== Early life ==
Aimer's father was a bassist in a band, so music surrounded her from a very young age. She started violin study in elementary school and admired the music of Ringo Sheena and Hikaru Utada. In junior high school, the music of Avril Lavigne inspired her to take up guitar and began writing lyrics in English. At the age of 15, Aimer lost her voice due to vocal cord overuse and underwent silence therapy for treatment. After she recovered, she acquired her distinctive husky voice.

== Career ==
Aimer teamed up with the "nonami" group, which has worked with, produced, or provided music for various artists, including Yuki, Mika Nakashima, Flumpool, Superfly, Yuzu, and Genki Rockets. In 2011, her musical career began in earnest. In May 2011, they released the concept album Your favorite things. It covered numerous popular works, including works in various genre such as jazz and country western music. The number 1 record cover was based on Lady Gaga's "Poker Face", and was the first song to appear in the lead album chart for the jazz category in the iTunes Store. The album reached number 2.

On September 7, 2011, Aimer debuted for Defstar Records, with the song "Rokutousei no Yoru", which was selected by Fuji TV as the ending theme of the 2011 anime series No. 6. "Rokutousei no Yoru" recorded its highest ranking at number 9 on the Recochoku music distribution chart. The second single was released on December 14, 2011. "Re:pray/ Sabishikute Nemurenai Yoru wa" reached number 1 in the Mora music download charts site. The song "Re: pray" was chosen as the 29th ending theme for the anime Bleach. The single also includes the cover of "Poker Face" from Your Favorite Things.

On February 22, 2012, she released her third single, "Yuki no Furumachi/Fuyu no Diamond", which had the theme of "winter" on all tracks. On May 11, 2012, Aimer released a digital single called "Hoshikuzu Venus". This single was intended to be the theme song and background music for Sasaki Nozomi's drama, Koi nante Zeitaku ga Watashi ni Ochite Kuru no daro ka?. This drama aired on April 16, 2012. On August 15, Aimer released her fourth single, "Anata ni Deawanakereba: Kasetsu Toka / Hoshikuzu Venus", which included a cover of Neil Sedaka's "Breaking Up Is Hard to Do". The first track of the single "Anata ni Deawanakereba: Kasetsu Toka" is an ending song of Fuji TV's anime series Natsuyuki Rendezvous.

On March 20, 2013, Aimer released the single "Re: I Am", which was used as the ending theme for the penultimate episode of Mobile Suit Gundam Unicorn. According to an interview, the song title "is an anagram of [her] name (Aimer), and has the meaning of breaking down a word and constructing it into another." Aimer's eighth single, "Brave Shine", was used as the second opening theme to the Fate/stay night: Unlimited Blade Works anime, and was released on June 3, 2015. Another song, "Last Stardust", which was also a candidate for the opening, appears as an insert song in episode No. 20.

On August 18, 2016, Aimer announced her special 4th studio album Daydream would be released on September 21 featuring collaboration songs between her and popular artists such as Taka (One Ok Rock), Yojiro Noda (Radwimps), TK (Ling Tosite Sigure), chelly (Egoist), Takahito Uchisawa (androp), Hiroyuki Sawano, Sukima Switch, and Mao Abe. Taka additionally produced four new songs for this album, while TK provided two. Also includes the ending theme of Kabaneri of the Iron Fortress (anime) made in collaboration with chelly (Egoist) and Hiroyuki Sawano and more for 13 tracks total. The album was released in three versions: a limited CD+Blu-ray (Type-A), a limited CD+DVD edition (Type-B), and a regular CD only edition. The song "Falling Alone" was used as lead track and was previously released as her 10th digital single as advance of the album.

On August 20, 2016, Aimer revealed her face for the first time on Music Station with the song "Chouchou Musubi". Following the announcement of her 4th album Daydream, Aimer performed the ending song to the Season 5 of anime series Natsume's Book of Friends, "Akane Sasu". On January 5, 2017, it was announced that Aimer wrote a song for the Japanese culinary exhibition "Tabegamisama no Fushigina Resutoranten" directed by the multimedia entertainment studio Moment Factory. A day after it was revealed on Aimer's official Twitter profile that the name of the song for the exhibition would be "Kachō Fūgetsu". Later, it was also revealed another single, which would be used as opening theme for the Japanese drama Ubai ai, fuyu, titled "Kogoesōna Kisetsu Kara", and would be released on February 10, 2017. The compilation albums Best Selection "blanc" and Best Selection "noir" were released on May 3, 2017. On November 11, Aimer released the single "One", which peaked at No. 2 on both Oricon and Billboard Japan charts.

Her single "Ref:rain" was released digitally on February 18, 2018, and received a physical release on February 21, 2018. The song is used as the ending theme to the 2018 anime television series After the Rain. On September 7, 2018, Aimer released the single "Black Bird", which was used as the theme song for the Japanese live-action film adaptation of the manga Kasane. On January 8, 2019, Aimer released the single "I beg you" for the anime film Fate/stay night: Heaven's Feel II. lost butterfly. The song became her first No. 1 single on Oricon's chart. She released two simultaneous albums, Sun Dance and Penny Rain, on April 10, 2019. She recorded the ending theme song "Torches" for the anime adaptation of the manga series Vinland Saga. She released her 18th single "Haru wa Yuku" on March 25, 2020. The song serves as the main theme of the anime film Fate/stay night: Heaven's Feel III. spring song. Aimer's song, "Spark-Again" has become the opening theme to the season 2 of the hit series Fire Force. In 2021, Aimer's song "Zankyōsanka" was used for season two of Demon Slayer: Kimetsu no Yaiba. In 2022, her song "Deep Down" also featured as one of the 12 ending theme songs for the anime Chainsaw Man, which was used in the 9th episode. In early 2023, Aimer's song "Escalate" was featured as the opening theme for the anime Nier: Automata Ver1.1a, that aired on January 8, 2023. She will perform the ending theme "Atemonaku" (Aimlessly) for the anime Ranking of Kings: The Treasure Chest of Courage. Aimer's single "Zankyosanka" has surpassed 500 million cumulative streams on the Oricon Weekly Streaming Ranking, according to the latest chart released on August 27. This marks the first time one of Aimer's songs has crossed the 500 million milestone.

== Personal life ==
On January 1, 2023, Aimer announced that she had married musician Masahiro Tobinai.

On September 7, 2026, Aimer announced the birth of her first child. In addition, she announced her departure from Agehasprings to establish a new management company with Tobinai.

== Discography ==
=== Studio albums ===
Title	Details	Peak chart positions			Sales	Certifications
Title	Details	JPN	JPN Comb (Note: The Oricon Combined Albums Chart was established on December 24, 2018.)	KOR (Note: Sources for studio album chart positions are as follows: Dawn, Daydream, Sun Dance and Penny Rain.)	Sales	Certifications
Sleepless Nights	Released: October 3, 2012; Label: Defstar Records; Formats: CD, CD+DVD, digital download	11	—	—	—N/a	
Midnight Sun	Released: June 25, 2014; Label: Defstar Records; Formats: CD, CD+DVD, digital download	9	—	—	JPN: 19,000+	
Dawn	Released: July 29, 2015; Label: Defstar Records; Formats: CD, CD+DVD, CD+Blu-ray, digital download	4	—	3	JPN: 39,000+; KOR: 600	
Daydream	Released: September 21, 2016; Label: SME; Formats: CD, CD+DVD, CD+Blu-ray, digital download	2	—	3	JPN: 100,000+; KOR: 600	RIAJ: Gold (phy.)
Sun Dance & Penny Rain (Limited edition)	Released: April 10, 2019; Label: SME; Formats: 2CD+2Blu-ray, 2CD+2DVD	—	—	—		
Sun Dance	Released: April 10, 2019; Label: SME; Formats: CD, CD+DVD, CD+Blu-ray, digital download	3	3	66	JPN: 37,356	
Penny Rain	Released: April 10, 2019; Label: SME; Formats: CD, CD+DVD, CD+Blu-ray, digital download	2	2	67	JPN: 36,296	
Walpurgis	Released: April 14, 2021; Label: SME; Formats: CD, CD+DVD, CD+Blu-ray, CD+2Blu-ray, 2LP, digital download	2	2	—	JPN: 28,920	
Open α Door	Released: July 26, 2023; Label: Sacra Music; Formats: CD, CD+DVD, CD+Blu-ray, digital download	3	4	—	JPN: 19,697	

=== Compilation albums ===
Title	Details	Peak chart positions			Sales	Certifications
Title	Details	JPN	JPN Comb (Note: The Oricon Combined Albums Chart was established on December 24, 2018.)	KOR (Note: Sources for best album chart positions are as follows: Best Selection "Blanc", Best Selection "Noir".)	Sales	Certifications
Best Selection "Blanc"	Released: May 3, 2017; Label: SME Records; Formats: CD, CD+DVD, CD+Blu-ray, digital download	3	—	4	JPN: 100,000+; KOR: 500	RIAJ: Gold (phy.)
Best Selection "Noir"	Released: May 3, 2017; Label: SME Records; Formats: CD, CD+DVD, CD+Blu-ray, digital download	4	—	5	JPN: 100,000+; KOR: 500	RIAJ: Gold (phy.)
Hoshi no Kieta Yoru ni (B-side collection)	Released: January 26, 2022; Label: Sacra Music; Formats: CD, CD+DVD, CD+Blu-ray, digital download	3	3	—	JPN: 19,700	

=== Mini albums ===
Title	Details	Peak chart positions	
Title	Details	JPN	JPN Comb (Note: The Oricon Combined Albums Chart was established on December 24, 2018.)
After Dark	Released: November 20, 2013; Label: DefSTAR Records; Formats: CD, digital download	23	—
Dare ka, Umi wo. (誰か、海を。)	Released: September 3, 2014; Label: DefSTAR Records; Formats: CD, CD+DVD, digital download	18	—
花の唄/I beg you/春はゆく	Released: August 19, 2020; Label: SME Records; Formats: CD, CD+DVD, digital download	4	4
Deep Down	Released: December 14, 2022; Label: Sarca Music; Formats: CD, CD+DVD, digital download	3	3
Haruka / 800 / End of All / Ref:rain (3 nuits ver.)	Released: June 5, 2024; Label: Sarca Music; Formats: CD, CD+DVD, digital download	11	14

=== Singles ===
Title	Year	Peak chart positions				Sales	Certifications	Album
Title	Year	JPN	JPN Comb (Note: The Oricon Combined Singles Chart was established on December 24, 2018.)	JPN Hot	WW	Sales	Certifications	Album
"Rokutosei no Yoru" (六等星の夜)	2011	28	—	20	—			Sleepless Nights
"Kanashimi wa Aurora ni" (悲しみはオーロラに)	2011	28	—	—	—			Sleepless Nights
"Twinkle Twinkle Little Star"	2011	28	—	—	—			Sleepless Nights
"Re:pray"	2011	41	—	35	—			Sleepless Nights
"Sabishikute Nemurenai Yoru wa" (寂しくて眠れない夜は)	2011	41	—	—	—			Sleepless Nights
"Yuki no Furumachi" (雪の降る街)	2012	72	—	—	—			Sleepless Nights
"Fuyu no Diamond" (冬のダイヤモンド)	2012	72	—	—	—			Sleepless Nights
"Anata ni Deawanakereba ～Kasetsu Toka～" (あなたに出会わなければ～夏雪冬花～)	2012	26	—	93	—		RIAJ: Gold (dig.)	Sleepless Nights
"Hoshikuzu Venus" (星屑ビーナス)	2012	26	—	—	—		RIAJ: Gold (st.)	Sleepless Nights
"Re: I Am"	2013	6	—	27	—		RIAJ: Gold (dig.)	Midnight Sun
"Nemuri no Mori" (眠りの森)	2013	—	—	—	—			Midnight Sun
"StarRingChild"	2014	3	—	17	—		RIAJ: Gold (dig.)	Midnight Sun
"Dare ka, Umi wo." (誰か、海を。)	2014	—	—	41	—			Dawn
"Broken Night"	2014	—	—	34	—			Dawn
"Hollow World"	2014	—	—	—	—			Dawn
"Kimi wo Matsu" (君を待つ)	2015	—	—	—	—			Dawn
"Brave Shine"	2015	4	—	4	—		RIAJ: Gold (dig.)	Dawn
"Ninelie" (with Chelly of Egoist)	2016	9	—	4	—		RIAJ: Gold (dig.)	Daydream
"Insane Dream"	2016	13	—	17	—			Daydream
"Us"	2016	13	—	—	—			Daydream
"Chouchou Musubi" (蝶々結び)	2016	10	—	8	—		RIAJ: Gold (dig.); Platinum (st.)	Daydream
"Akanesasu" (茜さす)	2016	8	—	8	—		RIAJ: Gold (dig.)	Best Selection "Blanc"
"Everlasting Snow"	2016	8	—	49	—			Best Selection "Blanc"
"One"	2017	2	36	2	—			Sun Dance & Penny Rain
"Hana no Uta" (花の唄)	2017	2	36	6	—		RIAJ: Gold (dig.)	Sun Dance & Penny Rain
"Rokutosei no Yoru Magic Blue ver." (六等星の夜 Magic Blue ver.)	2017	2	36	—	—			Sun Dance & Penny Rain
"Ref:rain"	2018	6	—	6	—			Sun Dance & Penny Rain
"Mabayui Bakari" (眩いばかり)	2018	6	—	—	—			Sun Dance & Penny Rain
"Black Bird"	2018	5	—	3	—			Sun Dance & Penny Rain
"Tiny Dancers"	2018	5	—	85	—			Sun Dance & Penny Rain
"Omoide wa Kireide" (思い出は奇麗で)	2018	5	—	—	—			Sun Dance & Penny Rain
"I Beg You"	2019	1	1	2	—		RIAJ: Gold (dig.)	Sun Dance & Penny Rain
"Hanabiratachi no March" (花びらたちのマーチ)	2019	1	1	58	—			Sun Dance & Penny Rain
"Sailing"	2019	1	1	38	—			Sun Dance & Penny Rain
"Stand-Alone"	2019	—	20	19	—		RIAJ: Gold (dig.)	Walpurgis
"Torches"	2019	6	6	26	—			Walpurgis
"Haru wa Yuku" (春はゆく)	2020	3	2	4	—		RIAJ: Gold (dig.)	Walpurgis
"Marie"	2020	3	2	—	—			Walpurgis
"Spark-Again"	2020	3	7	20	—		RIAJ: Gold (dig.)	Walpurgis
"Gracenote" (グレースノート)	2021	—	—	—	—			Hoshi no Kieta Yoruni
"One and Last"	2021	—	—	85	—			Hoshi no Kieta Yoruni
"Zankyōsanka" (残響散歌)	2021	1	1	1	37		RIAJ: Gold (phy.); Gold (dig.); 3× Platinum (st.)	Open α Door
"Asa ga Kuru" (朝が来る)	2021	1	1	6	—		RIAJ: Gold (phy.); Gold (dig.)	Open α Door
"Omokage" (おもかげ) (with Milet and Lilas Ikuta)	2021	—	27	11	—		RIAJ: Platinum (st.)	Non-album single
"Wavy Flow"	2022	—	—	—	—			Deep Down
"Oaiko" (オアイコ)	2022	—	—	77	—			Open α Door
"Deep Down"	2022	—	—	66	—			Open α Door
"Escalate"	2023	7	16	77	—			Open α Door
"Atemonaku" (あてもなく)	2023	16	45	—	—			Open α Door
"Resonantia"	2023	—	—	—	—			Open α Door
"Shiroiro Kagerō" (白色蜉蝣)	2023	6	39	—	—			Non-album single
"800"	2024	—	—	—	—			Haruka / 800 / End of All / Ref:rain -3 nuits ver.-
"Haruka" (遥か)	2024	—	—	—	—			Haruka / 800 / End of All / Ref:rain -3 nuits ver.-
"Sign"	2024	11	—	—	—	JPN: 4,729 (phy.)		Non-album singles
"Scope"	2025	3	30	—	—	JPN: 8,058 (phy.)		Non-album singles
"A World Where the Sun Never Rises" (太陽が昇らない世界)	2025	8	9	8	—	JPN: 17,781 (phy.)		Non-album singles
"Little Bouquet"	2025	9	—	—	—	JPN: 5,654 (phy.)		Non-album singles
"Pastoral"	2025	9	—	—	—	JPN: 5,654 (phy.)		Non-album singles
"Live to Survive"	2026	—	—	—	—			Non-album singles

=== Other charted and certified songs ===
Title	Year	Peak chart positions		Certifications	Album
Title	Year	JPN Comb (Note: The Oricon Combined Singles Chart was established on December 24, 2018.)	JPN Hot	Certifications	Album
"Refrain ga Sakenderu" (リフレインが叫んでる)	2012	—	73		Bitter & Sweet
"Last Stardust"	2015	—	37	RIAJ: Gold (dig.)	Dawn
"Kataomoi" (カタオモイ)	2016	49	29	RIAJ: Gold (dig.); 3× Platinum (st.)	Daydream
"Koiwazurai" (コイワズライ)	2019	29	27	RIAJ: Platinum (st.)	Sun Dance

=== Cover albums ===
Title	Details	Peak chart positions
Title	Details	JPN
Your Favorite Things	Released: May 11, 2011; Label: Defstar Records; Format: Digital download	—
Bitter & Sweet	Released: December 12, 2012; Label: DefSTAR Records; Formats: CD, digital download	53

=== Live videos ===
Title	Details	Peak chart positions
Title	Details	JPN
Aimer Live in Budokan "blanc et noir"	Released: December 13, 2017; Label: SME Records; Format: Blu-ray + CD	5
Aimer Special Concert with Slovak National Radio Symphony Orchestra "Aria Strings"	Released: October 31, 2018; Label: SME Records; Formats: Blu-ray + CD, DVD + CD	1

=== Collaboration albums ===
Title	Album details	Artist(s)
UnChild	Released: June 25, 2014; Label: DefSTAR Records; Formats: CD, digital download	SawanoHiroyuki[nZk]:Aimer
Another Me	Released: August 13, 2014; Label: J-More; Format: Digital download	Fukui Mai x Aimer

=== Guest appearances ===
Song	Year	Album	Album artist
"Bananafish to Hamabe to Kuroi Niji" (with Aimer)	2014	See More Glass	Galileo Galilei
"Song of ..<AM>"	2015	o1	SawanoHiroyuki[nZk]
"S-ave"	2015	o1	SawanoHiroyuki[nZk]
"Bed / Love Song" (featuring Aimer)	2016	Sea and the Darkness	Galileo Galilei
"bL∞dy f8 -eUC-"	2016	Into the Sky EP	SawanoHiroyuki[nZk]
"Told U So"	2016	P.Y.L	Illion
"Bright Stars" (featuring Aimer)	2016	Kings of the Playground	Grown Kids
"Listen" (featuring Avril Lavigne); (Aimer as background vocal)	2017	Ambitions	One Ok Rock
"Ninelie <Cry-v>"	2017	2V-ALK	SawanoHiroyuki[nZk]
"Memento Mori" (featuring Aimer)	2018	Cocoon	Androp
"I-mage" (featuring Aimer)	2019	R∃/MEMBER	SawanoHiroyuki[nZk]
"Prologue" (featuring Aimer)	2021	Hope	Shota Shimizu
"The Road Not Taken" (featuring Aimer)	2024	Non-album single	HOYO-MiX

== Filmography ==
=== Music videos ===
Song	Year	Director(s)	Production
"Anata ni Deawanakereba ~Kasetsutouka~" (あなたに出会わなければ～夏雪冬花～)	2012	Tatsuya Murakami	Unknown
"Re:pray"	2012	Takahiro Miki	Unknown
"Yuki no Furu Machi" (雪の降る街)	2012	Takeshi Matsuda; Masakazu Fukatsu	Unknown
"Re: I Am"	2013	Tsuyoshi Araki	Unknown
"StarRingChild"	2013	Masakazu Fukatsu	factory1994
"Nemuri no Mori" (眠りの森)	2013	Gaku Kinoshita	Unknown
"Polaris" (ポラリス)	2014	Gaku Kinoshita	Unknown
"Kyoukara Omoide" (今日から思い出)	2014	Gaku Kinoshita	Unknown
"Dare ka, Umi wo" (誰か、海を。)	2014	maxilla	
"broKen NIGHT"	2015	Tatsunori Sato	19-juke-
"Brave Shine"	2015	Ryohei Shingu	19-juke-
"Believe Be:leave"	2015	Tatsunori Sato	19-juke-
"Kimi wo Matsu" (君を待つ)	2015	Gaku Kinoshita	Unknown
"ninelie"	2016	biogon pictures inc.	
"insane dream"	2016	Stephen Wayne Mallet	Green Glow Films
"us"	2016	Masakazu Fukatsu	Unknown
"Chouchou Musubi" (蝶々結び)	2016	Shunji Iwai	Tamai Emi
"Stars in the rain"	2016	Tani Satoshi	c.Ray
"Falling Alone"	2016	bait	Unknown
"Kataomoi" (カタオモイ)	2017	Unknown	Unknown
"Akanesasu" (茜さす)	2017	Unknown	Unknown
"everlasting snow"	2017	Unknown	Unknown
"Kogoesuna Kisetsu Kara" (凍えそうな季節から)	2017	19-juke-	
"ONE"	2017	Takeshi Maruyama	SEP
"Ref:rain"	2018	Yūki Yamato	Unknown
"Mabayui Bakari"(眩いばかり)	2018	Masakazu Fukatsu	Unknown
"Omoide wa Kireide"(思い出は奇麗で)	2018	Gaku Kinoshita	Unknown
"Hana no Uta"(花の唄)	2018	Takahiro Miki	Unknown
"I Beg You"	2019	Takahiro Miki	Unknown
"3min"	2019	Unknown	Unknown
"Torches"	2019	Unknown	Unknown
"Haru wa Yuku"(春はゆく)	2020	Unknown	Unknown
"Skylight"	2023	Shintaro Sakai	19-juke- New Black
"Shiroiro Kagerou"	2023	Hidejin Kato	19-juke- New Black

=== Kōhaku Uta Gassen appearances ===
Year	Appearance	Song	Appearance order	Opponent	Notes
2022 (Reiwa 4) / 73rd	Debut	"Zankyōsanka"	21/44	N/A	Also performed "Omokage" with Milet, Lilas Ikuta, and Vaundy.

== Tours ==
- Aimer Live Tour "Maiden Voyage"
- Aimer Live Tour "DAWN"
- Aimer Hall Tour 2016 "like a daydream"
- Aimer LIVE TOUR 17/18 "hiver"
- Aimer Fan Club Tour ”été"
- Aimer Hall Tour 18/19 "soleil et pluie"
- Aimer "soleil et pluie" Asia Tour (2019)
- Aimer Hall Tour 19/20 "rouge de bleu"
- Aimer Hall Tour 2022 "Walpurgisnacht"
- Aimer Arena Tour 2023 -nuit immersive-
- Aimer 3 nuits tour 2024
- Aimer Hall Tour 2024-25 "lune blanche"

== Awards and nominations ==
Year	Award	Category	Nominee/work	Result
2011	Billboard Japan Music Awards	Animation Artist of the Year	Aimer	Nominated
2013	CD Shop Awards	Grand Prix	Sleepless Nights	Nominated
2015	Music Jacket Awards	Second Prize	Dare ka, Umi wo.	Won
2015	Newtype Anime Awards	Best Theme Song	"Brave Shine" (from anime Fate/stay night: Unlimited Blade Works)	Won
2016	Music Jacket Awards	Grand Prize	Dawn	Nominated
2017	CD Shop Awards	Sub-Grand Prix	Daydream	Won
2017	Space Shower Music Awards	Best Female Artist	Aimer	Nominated
2018	Space Shower Music Awards	Best Female Artist	Aimer	Nominated
2018	Newtype Anime Awards	Best Theme Song	"Hana no Uta" (from anime film Fate/stay night: Heaven's Feel I. presage flower)	4th place
2019	Newtype Anime Awards	Best Theme Song	"I Beg You" (from anime film Fate/stay night: Heaven's Feel II. lost butterfly)	5th place
2020	Space Shower Music Awards	Best Female Artist	Aimer	Nominated
2022	Billboard Japan Music Awards	Hot 100 of the Year	"Zankyosanka"	Won
2022	MTV Video Music Awards Japan	Best Solo Artist Video – Japan	"Zankyosanka"	Won
2022	64th Japan Record Awards	Special Prize	Aimer	Won
