= Mobile Suit Gundam Unicorn =

Japanese novel series

- Cover of volume one of the Mobile Suit Gundam Unicorn light novel series

機動戦士ガンダムUC(ユニコーン) (Kidō Senshi Gandamu Yunikōn)
- Genre: Mecha, Military science fiction
- Created by: Hajime Yatate; Yoshiyuki Tomino
- Serial novel
- Written by: Harutoshi Fukui
- Published by: Kadokawa Shoten
- Magazine: Gundam Ace
- Original run: February 2007 – August 2009
- Volumes: 10 + 1 extra
- Manga

Mobile Suit Gundam Unicorn: Bande Dessinée
- Written by: Harutoshi Fukui
- Illustrated by: Kouzou Oomori
- Published by: Kadokawa Shoten
- Magazine: Gundam Ace
- Original run: January 26, 2010 – December 26, 2016
- Volumes: 17
- Original video animation
- Directed by: Kazuhiro Furuhashi
- Written by: Yasuyuki Muto
- Music by: Hiroyuki Sawano
- Studio: Sunrise
- Licensed by: NA: Sunrise; UK: Anime Limited
- Released: March 12, 2010 – June 6, 2014
- Runtime: 50 minutes (ep. 1−6); 90 minutes (ep. 7)
- Episodes: 7
- Anime television series

Mobile Suit Gundam Unicorn RE:0096
- Directed by: Kazuhiro Furuhashi
- Written by: Yasuyuki Muto
- Music by: Hiroyuki Sawano
- Studio: Sunrise
- Licensed by: NA: Sunrise
- Original network: ANN (Nagoya TV, TV Asahi)
- English network: US: Adult Swim (Toonami)
- Original run: April 3, 2016 – September 11, 2016
- Episodes: 22
- Manga

Mobile Suit Gundam Unicorn: Bande Dessinée Episode: 0
- Written by: Harutoshi Fukui
- Illustrated by: Kouzou Oomori
- Published by: Kadokawa Shoten
- Magazine: Gundam Ace
- Original run: September 26, 2017 – September 26, 2018
- Volumes: 3
- Film
- Mobile Suit Gundam Narrative
- icon

Mobile Suit Gundam Unicorn (Japanese: 機動戦士ガンダムUC(ユニコーン), Hepburn: Kidō Senshi Gandamu Yunikōn) is a novel series written by Harutoshi Fukui with character and mechanical designs provided by Yoshikazu Yasuhiko and Hajime Katoki, respectively. It is first serialized in Kadokawa Shoten's Gundam Ace magazine from February 2007 to August 2009, compiling into 10 volumes alongside one extra volume released on March 26, 2016. The novel originally serves as a sequel to Mobile Suit Gundam: Char's Counterattack. (Note: The novels take place after the events of the Beltorchika's Children novel while the anime is set after the events of the 1988 film.)

An anime adaptation was produced by Sunrise as a seven-episode original video animation series and released between March 12, 2010, and June 6, 2014, on DVD and Blu-ray Disc. It was directed by Kazuhiro Furuhashi. A television recompilation of the anime adaptation titled Mobile Suit Gundam Unicorn RE:0096 began airing on April 3, 2016, replacing Brave Beats, and becoming the first Gundam series to air on TV Asahi since After War Gundam X which ended in 1996. Mobile Suit Gundam Unicorn RE:0096 also aired in the United States on Adult Swim's Toonami programming block beginning on January 8, 2017. The 11th novel volume, Phoenix Hunting, was loosely adapted as an animated film titled Mobile Suit Gundam Narrative in 2018.

== Plot ==
The series begins in U.C. 0001, at the very beginning of human space colonization, when Laplace, the residential space station of the Federation's Prime Minister, is destroyed by an anti-federation group during a ceremony hosted by the Prime Minister ushering in the Universal Century Calendar. The main story takes place in UC 0096, sixteen years after the end of the One Year War, three years after the events of Mobile Suit Gundam: Char's Counterattack, and 27 years before Mobile Suit Gundam F91.

The story revolves around Banagher Links, a seemingly normal boy living and going to school in the space colonies. His life changes one day when he meets a girl named Audrey Burne, as it results in his becoming the pilot of a new Gundam that has connections to an item that is a potential threat to the Federation's existence called "Laplace's Box."

== Media ==
=== Novel ===
No.	Title	Release date	ISBN
1	Day of the Unicorn (Part 1); Yunikōn no Hi (Jō) (ユニコーンの日(上))	September 21, 2007	978-4-04-713969-5
2	Day of the Unicorn (Part 2); Yunikōn no Hi (Ge) (ユニコーンの日(下))	September 21, 2007	978-4-04-713970-1
3	The Red Comet; Akai Suisei (赤い彗星)	December 20, 2007	978-4-04-715003-4
4	Palau Capture Battle; Parao Kōryaku Sen (パラオ攻略戦)	April 24, 2008	978-4-04-715060-7 (regular edition); 978-4-04-715018-8 (limited edition)
5	The Ghost of Laplace; Rapurasu no Bōrei (ラプラスの亡霊)	July 24, 2008	978-4-04-715084-3
6	In the Depths of a Gravity Well; Jūryoku no Ido no Soko de (重力の井戸の底で)	October 23, 2008	978-4-04-715112-3
7	Black Unicorn; Kuroi Yunikōn (黒いユニコーン)	December 24, 2008	978-4-04-715143-7
8	The Sky and the Stars; Sora to Hoshi to (宇宙と惑星と)	April 15, 2009 (limited edition); April 23, 2009 (regular edition)	978-4-04-715197-0 (limited edition); 978-4-04-715229-8 (regular edition)
9	Over the Rainbow (Part 1); Niji no Kanata ni (Jō) (虹の彼方に(上))	August 20, 2009	978-4-04-715286-1
10	Over the Rainbow (Part 2); Niji no Kanata ni (Ge) (虹の彼方に(下))	August 20, 2009	978-4-04-715287-8
11	Phoenix Hunting; Fushichō Kari (不死鳥狩り)	March 26, 2016	978-4-04-103921-2

Fukui also wrote a prequel novel, which was bundled with the PlayStation 3 game's Special Edition released on March 8, 2012. Mobile Suit Gundam Unicorn - The Postwar War (機動戦士ガンダムUC(ユニコーン) 戦後の戦争, Kidō Senshi Gandamu Yunikōn Sengo no Sensō) contains an all-new story set two years before the events of the first episode. It deals with Full Frontal's origins and how the Neo Zeon stole the Sinanju. Mobile Suit Gundam Unicorn - Phoenix Hunting (機動戦士ガンダムUC(ユニコーン) 不死鳥狩り, Kidō Senshi Gandamu Yunikōn Fushichō kari) was originally included with Mobile Suit Gundam Unicorn GREAT WORKS III episode 7, a collection of storyboards, artworks and interviews released on June 23, 2015, and revolved around Operation Phoenix Hunting, a top secret mission carried out by a Federation garrison just before the last battle between the Nahel Argama and the Neo Zeon forces.

Both books were compiled into the 11th volume, released on March 26, 2016, the first of a series of short stories that take place around that point of the Universal Century.

=== Manga ===
A manga adaptation titled Mobile Suit Gundam Unicorn Bande Dessinée (機動戦士ガンダムUC(ユニコーン)バンデシネ, Kidō Senshi Gandamu Yunikōn Bandeshine) was serialized in Kadokawa Shoten's Gundam Ace from January 2010 to December 2016. The manga was written by Harutoshi Fukui and illustrated by Kouzou Oomori. Its first tankōbon volume was released on July 26, 2010, and the seventeenth and last was released on February 25, 2017. A three-volume prequel manga by Fukui and Oomori based on The Postwar War novel, Mobile Suit Gundam Unicorn Bande Dessinée Episode: 0 was serialized in Gundam Ace from September 2017 to September 2018 and compiled into three tankōbon volumes.

=== Anime ===
In the June 2009 issue of the Japanese monthly manga magazine Gundam Ace, it was announced that an anime adaptation of Gundam Unicorn was green-lit for late 2009 and later moved to spring 2010. It is directed by Kazuhiro Furuhashi and features screenplays written by Yasuyuki Muto. Hajime Katoki, who was the mechanical designer for the novel, works on the anime alongside veteran designers Junya Ishigaki and Mika Akitaka, and newcomer Nobuhiko Genba. Yoshikazu Yasuhiko's character designs were adapted for the series Kumiko Takahashi, and the music is composed by Hiroyuki Sawano. It was planned to be six 50-minute episodes with a worldwide release. However, on May 13, 2012, Bandai announced that the storyline will wrap up with a seventh episode. The series premiered on PlayStation Network Japan for PlayStation 3 and PlayStation Portable systems on February 20, 2010. The Blu-ray Disc edition was released simultaneously worldwide on March 12, 2010, featuring both Japanese and English audio and subtitles in five languages (Japanese, English, French, Spanish and Chinese). Bandai Entertainment released the first four episodes of Unicorn on DVD before shutting down in 2012, thus making it the final Gundam anime licensed by the company. Sunrise released the OVA series on DVD in North America in four volumes with distribution from Right Stuf Inc. beginning in August 2013.

A television rebroadcast of the anime titled Mobile Suit Gundam Unicorn RE:0096 was announced by Sunrise on February 21, 2016 and began airing on April 3, 2016, in Japan on TV Asahi and other networks, replacing Brave Beats. The series ran for 22 episodes and ended on September 11, 2016. This is the first Gundam series to air on TV Asahi since After War Gundam X which ended in 1996. The rebroadcast includes some reanimated scenes and episode recaps and previews narrated by Shuichi Ikeda as his Full Frontal character, as well as a new opening and two new ending themes all composed by Hiroyuki Sawano, under his alias, "SawanoHiroyuki[nZk]", the first opening theme titled "Into the Sky" is performed by SawanoHiroyuki[nZk]:Tielle, the first ending theme titled "Next 2U -eUC-" is performed by SawanoHiroyuki[nZk]:naNami and the second ending theme titled "bL∞dy f8 -eUC-" is performed by SawanoHiroyuki[nZk]:Aimer. Two special themes were shown during the series: the opening theme from episode 18 titled "Re: I Am", the ending theme of the 6th part, and the theme song from episode 22 (last) titled "StarRingChild", the theme song of the 7th part, both are performed by Aimer.

The 11th novel volume, Phoenix Hunting, was loosely adapted as Mobile Suit Gundam Narrative animated film in 2018.

=== Video games ===
The RX-0 Unicorn Gundam is one of the playable secret mobile suits in Mobile Suit Gundam: Gundam vs. Gundam Next. For the PlayStation Portable port Mobile Suit Gundam: Gundam vs. Gundam Next Plus, the Unicorn is joined by the NZ-666 Kshatriya. The Unicorn is part of Dynasty Warriors: Gundam 3, along with the Sinanju and Kshatriya (DLC only). The Gundam UC is a playable story mode in Dynasty Warriors: Gundam Reborn, where one can play as Unicorn Gundam, Sinanju, Banshee, Kshatriya, Delta Plus, Geara Zulu (Angelo), Geara Zulu and the Unicorn Gundam Full Armor is playable as DLC. The Unicorn, Kshatriya, Sinanju, and the Delta Plus are the initial UC units included in the arcade game Mobile Suit Gundam: Extreme Vs., and were later supplemented by the Banshee and Rozen Zulu, then again by the Full Armor Unicorn and the Banshee Norn. In Extreme Vs. Force, the Neo Zeong appears as a boss unit. In the Wii and PlayStation Portable game SD Gundam G Generation World, the Unicorn Gundam, Kshatriya, Sinanju, Delta Plus, Loto, Rezel, the Jegan units and Geara Zulu (including Angelo Sauper's custom) are playable units. In SD Overworld, units from episode 4 and 5 are now included with some units from the PS3 game, such as Gundam Delta Kai, Delta Gundam and the Sinanju Stein. This suit is also in SD Gundam Online.

An action game based on the first three episodes of the anime adaptation was developed by From Software and was published by Namco Bandai on March 8, 2012, in Japan.

=== Toys/models ===
The first models to come from the series were the 1/100 Master Grade "Ver. Ka" (Ka stands for series mecha designer Hajime Katoki) kits of the Sinanju and the Unicorn in 2009, which were followed up with the Full Armor Unicorn in December 2011, the online exclusive Unicorn Banshee "Final Battle" version in March 2012, and the Sinanju Stein in February 2013. All four kits appear as depicted in the novels, while recolored versions based on the OVA were released. A 1/100 Sinanju rocket bazooka is packaged with the eighth issue in the novel series while a 1/100 Armed Armor DE is a free item for the eighth Bande Dessinee volume. The company also produced all of the OVA series' mobile suits (plus the UC MS Variations and Bande Dessinee manga series) in its HGUC line of 1/144 model kits (including the Base Jabber transports); some are special glitterized or colored transparent-plastic kits marketed as online exclusives or as "Theater Limited" items (sold at select moviehouses on the day of an episode screening). The prizes for Bandai's Gunpla mid-year 2014 campaign include clear-plastic HGUC versions of the Unicorn and Banshee (both in Destroy Mode), the Full-Armor Unicorn, Sinanju, Delta Plus, and the Kshatriya. The line also includes the biggest HGUC kit yet - the Neo-Zeong, which stands 86 centimeters high and 50 cm wide, and includes the Sinaju itself. A Real Grade version of the Sinanju was later revealed in 2016 Shizuoka Hobby Show and be fully released in August 2016.

A number of the kits are also available as Master Grade and B-Club models, with the MG 1/100 Unicorn Gundam also sold in a "HD" version featuring its hangar cage. Several UC kits in the two lines have Titanium Finish (metallic) versions. The Phenex was first sold at Gundam Front Tokyo in 1/144 scale as part of the promotions for One of Seventy-Two; the initial casting was criticized, but a Master Grade version of the unit was released in February 2014 as a gold cast model. A proper gold-coat and crystal-cast version of the 1/144 Phenex was sold at the store. A 1/144 Destroy Mode Unicorn was also released in limited numbers as part of the ANA Gundam Sky Project in April 2011.

The Gundam Fix Figuration line also has versions of the standard and Full-Armor Unicorn, and ReZEL, and metal composite Unicorns. Certain issues of Gundam UC Ace magazine also offer free weapon kits.

The series' appearance in the Robot Spirits line of action figures began with the release of the normal mode Unicorn in November 2009, followed by its Destroy Mode version, the Geara Zulu, the Stark Jegan, the Sinanju (as appeared in Episode 2 and 3; a second version released in January 2014, features a rocket bazooka, brighter red color scheme, and a burnt head.), Angelo Sauper's Geara Zulu, and the Destroy Mode and Norn versions of the Banshee. Bandai's Tamashii Shouten online-exclusive shop carries the Elite Guard Geara Zulu, which was released in February 2011, a Destroy Mode Unicorn with glittering psycoframe that can be mated with a special lighting stage. A Destroy Mode Unicorn with green glittering psycoframe as depicted in Episode 5 was released in 2013 with its own lighting stage. Katoki also joined forces with Bandai to create Robot Spirits versions of the Byarlant Custom, Yonem Kirks' Zaku I Sniper, and the Guncannon Detector as online exclusives under the "Ka Signature" collection. The Detector is also available in the red livery of the AEUG's Karaba terrestrial forces, plus the ARX-014 Silver Bullet.

Some units in the series are also available in the Assault Kingdom line of small poseable action figures.

=== Cross-promotion ===
In summer 2016, Sunrise partnered with 20th Century Fox on a Japanese cross-promotion deal involving Mobile Suit Gundam Unicorn and Independence Day: Resurgence. One Japanese theatrical poster put the Gundam Unicorn in the place of the Statue of Liberty aiming at a Harvester mothership, while another featured Banagher and Full Frontal alongside Independence Day characters such as former President Tom Whitmore (Bill Pullman) and Dylan Dubrow-Hiller (Jessie Usher).

The collaboration earned praise from Harutoshi Fukui, who was quoted in Anime News Network as saying, "Our two works are connected like soul brothers by the theme of humanity's indomitable spirit pushing despair aside. The enemy this time may be reeeeally big, but humans won't lose! The Unicorn Gundam will help too! (In our hearts.)"

== Reception ==
The seventh OVA episode of Mobile Suit Gundam Unicorn has grossed ¥308 million at the Japanese box office.

Anime News Network's Richard Winters gave the first volume an overall rating of 'A', praising the "crisp visuals" and "emotional characters" while warning the "casual observer" of the large amount of onscreen character death. He said "the animation is nothing short of incredible" and "for once the transformation sequences of the variable types do not rely on parts being able to magically detach and reattach".

=== Cultural impact ===
A full-scale statue of the RX-0 Unicorn Gundam from the series was installed outside Odaiba's DiverCity Tokyo Plaza, in Tokyo, Japan, in September 2017. It replaced a previous statue of the RX-78-2 Gundam.

== Notes ==
Preceded by Mobile Suit Gundam 00	Gundam metaseries (production order); 2010-2014	Succeeded by SD Gundam Sangokuden Brave Battle Warriors
Preceded by Mobile Suit Gundam: Char's Counterattack	Universal Century; UC 0096	Succeeded by Mobile Suit Gundam: Twilight Axis
