= One (Aimer song) =

Single by Aimer

from the album Sun Dance
- Language: Japanese; English
- B-side: "Hana no Uta / Rokutosei no Yoru Magic Blue ver."
- Released: October 11, 2017
- Studio: Studio Device • Prime Sound Studio Form • Studio Sound Valley • Sound City • Sign Sound
- Genre: J-pop; rock
- Length: 21:17
- Label: SME Records
- Songwriters: aimerrhythm; Rui Momota
- Producer: Kenji Tamai

Aimer singles chronology
| "Akanesasu" (2016) | "One" (2017) | "Ref:rain" (2018) |

Music video
- One on YouTube

"One" is the thirteenth single by Japanese singer Aimer, released on October 11, 2017 under SME Records. Written by Aimer (under her pen name "aimerrhythm") and Rui Momota, the single peaked at No. 2 on Oricon's singles charts and No. 3 on Billboard Japan's Hot 100.

Aimer debuted the song at her Nippon Budokan concert on August 29, 2017, calling it her "first dance song." She explained that "One" was a new chapter in her career after her compilation album Best Selection "noir" ended with the song "zero." The song expresses positivity and inspiration, with the "flag" as a symbol of starting over.

The single includes "Hana no Uta" (the ending theme of Fate/stay night: Heaven's Feel I. presage flower), "Rokutosei no Yoru Magic Blue ver." (Aimer's self-cover of her first single), and "Ito" (a Miyuki Nakajima cover).

== Track listing ==
=== CD ===
| No. | Title | Lyrics | Music | Arrangement | Length |
|---|---|---|---|---|---|
| 1. | "One" | aimerrhythm | Rui Momota | Kenji Tamai; Momota | 5:31 |
| 2. | "Hana no Uta" ((花の唄; "Flower Song")) | Yuki Kajiura | Kajiura | Kajiura | 6:13 |
| 3. | "Rokutosei no Yoru Magic Blue ver." ((六等星の夜; "Night of Sixth Magnitude Star Magic Blue ver.")) | aimerrhythm | Masahiro Tobinai | Tamai; Momota | 5:50 |
| 4. | "Ito" ((糸; "Yarn")) | Miyuki Nakajima | Nakajima | Tamai; Momota | 3:43 |

=== DVD ===
First Production Limited Edition

- "zero" (Music video)
- "Kachou Fugetsu" (歌鳥風月) (Music video)

== Music videos ==
One

Like her previous videos, Aimer herself does not appear on the music video of "One". The video, directed by Takeshi Maruyama, features dynamic shots of schoolgirls dancing, playing musical instruments, and performing synchronized flag dancing.

Hana no Uta

The music video for "Hana no Uta" was directed by Takahiro Miki and features actress Minami Hamabe.

== Other uses ==
"One" was used by Japan Airlines in their commercials supporting the Japan Men's and Women's curling teams at the 2018 Winter Olympics in Pyeongchang.

== Charts ==
| Chart (2017) | Peak position |
|---|---|
| Japanese Oricon Singles Chart | 2 |
| Billboard Japan Hot 100 | 3 |
| Billboard Japan Top Singles Sales | 3 |
| Billboard Japan Hot Animation | 2 ("Hana no Uta") |
| Billboard Japan Top Download Songs | 1 ("Hana no Uta"); 4 ("One") |
| Billboard Japan Top Streaming Songs | 25 ("Hana no Uta"); 53 ("One") |
