= Sleepless Nights (Aimer album) =

Studio album by Aimer
- Released: October 03, 2012
- Genre: Pop
- Length: 61:00
- Language: Japanese
- Label: Defstar Records
- Producer: Kenji Tamai

Aimer chronology
Sleepless Nights (2012)	Midnight Sun (2014)

Singles from Sleepless Nights
- 1. "Rokutousei no Yoru" Released: September 07, 2011; 2. "Kanashimi wa Aurora ni" Released: September 07, 2011; 3. "TWINKLE TWINKLE LITTLE STAR" Released: September 07, 2011; 4. "Re:pray" Released: December 14, 2011; 5. "Samishikute Nemurenai Yoru wa" Released: December 14, 2011; 6. "Anata ni Deawanakereba ~Kasetsutouka~" Released: August 15, 2012; 7. "Hoshikuzu Venus" Released: August 15, 2012

Sleepless Nights is the debut studio album by Japanese singer/songwriter Aimer. It was released on October 3, 2012 on Defstar Records in two versions: a limited CD+DVD edition and a regular CD-only edition.

== Track listing ==
All lyrics are written by aimerrhythm, except where noted

No.	Title	Writer(s)	Arrangement	Length
1.	"TWINKLE TWINKLE LITTLE STAR" (prologue)	Jane Taylor	Kenji Tamai; Masahiro Tobinai	1:28
2.	"Yakou Ressha ~nothing to lose~" (夜行列車～nothing to lose～; Night Train ~nothing to lose~)		Kenji Tamai; Masahiro Tobinai	5:03
3.	"Anata ni Deawanakereba ~Kasetsutouka~" (あなたに出会わなければ～夏雪冬花～; If I Hadn't Met You ~Summer Snow, Winter Flowers~)		Kenji Tamai; Rui Momota	6:00
4.	"Egao" (笑顔; Smile)		Kenji Tamai; Takahiro Furukawa	6:02
5.	"Re:pray"		Hayato Tanaka	5:04
6.	"Kanashimi wa Aurora ni (Restarred by Takagi Masakatsu)" (悲しみはオーロラに; Send Melancholy Towards Aurora)		Masakatsu Takagi	4:27
7.	"Samishikute Nemurenai Yoru wa" (寂しくて眠れない夜は; In the Lonely and Sleepless Nights)		Masahiro Tobinai	5:23
8.	"AM02:00"		Kenji Tamai; Integral Clover	5:29
9.	"Hoshikuzu Venus" (星屑ビーナス; Stardust Venus)		Kenji Tamai; Masahiro Tobinai	4:12
10.	"Yuki no Furu Machi" (雪の降る街; Town of Falling Snow)		Kenji Tamai; Shunsuke Tsuri	4:02
11.	"Fuyu no Diamond (Re-echoed by Genki Rockets)" (冬のダイヤモンド; The Diamond of Winter)		Genki Rockets	6:10
12.	"Rokutousei no Yoru" (六等星の夜; Night of Sixth Magnitude Star)		Shunsuke Tsuri	5:35
13.	"TWINKLE TWINKLE LITTLE STAR"		Kenji Tamai; Masahiro Tobinai	2:05
Total length:				61:00

== Awards and nominations ==
Year	Award	Category	Nominee/work	Result
2013	CD Shop Awards	Grand Prix	Sleepless Nights	Nominated
