= Daydream (Aimer album) =

daydream

Studio album by Aimer
- Released: September 21, 2016
- Recorded: Aobadai Studio • Burnish Stone Recording Studios • Heart Beat. Recording Studios • Onkio Haus • prime sound studio form • Studio Device • Studio GreenBird • Studio Sound Valley; Japan; The Beach; United States; Hansa Studios • Studio 4 Germany
- Genres: Pop; rock
- Length: 57:23
- Languages: Japanese; English
- Label: SME Records
- Producers: Aimer; Kenji Tamai; Taka; Hiroyuki Sawano; Takahito Uchisawa; Yojiro Noda; Sukima Switch; TK

Aimer chronology
DAWN (2015)	daydream (2016)	Best Selection "blanc"/"noir" (2017)

Singles from Daydream
- 1. "ninelie" Released: May 11, 2016; 2. "insane dream" Released: July 07, 2016; 3. "us" Released: July 07, 2016; 4. "Chouchou Musubi" Released: August 17, 2016; 5. "Falling Alone" Released: August 19, 2016

Daydream (style in all-lowercase) is the fourth studio album released by Aimer. It was released in three versions: a limited CD+Blu-ray (Type-A), a limited CD+DVD edition (Type-B), and a regular CD only edition. The song "Falling Alone" was used as the lead track and was previously released as her 10th digital single as advance of the album

The album charted #2 daily rank for first week. It charted so far 34 weeks and sold more than 78,000 copies. The album was certified Gold by Recording Industry Association of Japan in March 2017 for shipment of 100,000 copies.

== Track listing ==
daydream
No.	Title	Lyrics	Music	Arrangement	Length
1.	"insane dream"	aimerrhythm; Taka; Jamil Kazmi	Taka	Colin Brittain	4:13
2.	"ninelie" (with Chelly from Egoist)	Hiroyuki Sawano	Hiroyuki Sawano	Hiroyuki Sawano	4:21
3.	"twoface"	Takahito Uchisawa	Takahito Uchisawa	Takahito Uchisawa; Kenji Tamai; Masahiro Tobinai	3:05
4.	"Higher Ground"	aimerrhythm; Jamil Kazmi	Taka	Kenji Tamai; Rui Momota	5:14
5.	"for Lonely" (for ロンリー, with Mao Abe)	Mao Abe	Mao Abe	Kenji Tamai; Shogo Ohnishi	4:51
6.	"Chouchou Musubi" (蝶々結び; "Butterfly Knot")	Yojiro Noda	Yojiro Noda	Yojiro Noda	5:05
7.	"Kataomoi" (カタオモイ; "Unrequited Love")	Takahito Uchisawa	Takahito Uchisawa	Takahito Uchisawa; Kenji Tamai; Masahiro Tobinai	3:27
8.	"Hz"	Takuya Ohashi; Shintaro Tokita	Takuya Ohashi; Shintaro Tokita	Takuya Ohashi; Shintaro Tokita	4:49
9.	"Kowairo" (声色; "Tone of Voice")	TK	TK	TK	4:57
10.	"closer"	Taka; Jamil Kazmi	Taka	Colin Brittain	4:13
11.	"Falling Alone"	Taka; Jamil Kazmi	Taka	Colin Brittain	4:13
12.	"us"	TK	TK	TK	4:34
13.	"Stars in the rain"	aimerrhythm; Jamil Kazmi	Taka	Kenji Tamai; Shogo Ohnishi	5:02
Total length:					57:23

DVD
No.	Title	Length
1.	"insane dream" (Music Video)
2.	"us" (Music Video)
3.	"ninelie" (Music Video)
4.	"Falling Alone" (Music Video)
5.	"Chouchou Musubi" (Music Video)
6.	"Koutetsujou no Kabaneri" (Special Ending Movie)

Blu-ray
No.	Title	Length
1.	"insane dream" (Music Video)
2.	"us" (Music Video)
3.	"ninelie" (Music Video)
4.	"Falling Alone" (Music Video)
5.	"Chouchou Musubi" (Music Video)
6.	"MOON RIVER" (Aimer Live Tour "DAWN", 2015.11.03)
7.	"Believe Be:leave" (Aimer Live Tour "DAWN", 2015.11.03)
8.	"Noir! Noir!" (Aimer Live Tour "DAWN", 2015.11.03)
9.	"Anata ni Deawanakereba ~Kasetsu Touka~" (Aimer Live Tour "DAWN", 2015.11.03)
10.	"Kimi wo Matsu" (Aimer Live Tour "DAWN", 2015.11.03)
11.	"Re:pray" (Aimer Live Tour "DAWN", 2015.11.03)
12.	"Re:far" (Aimer Live Tour "DAWN", 2015.11.03)
13.	"Heartache (ONE OK ROCK cover)" (Aimer Live Tour "DAWN", 2015.11.03)
14.	"Dare ka, Umi wo" (Aimer Live Tour "DAWN", 2015.11.03)
15.	"AM02:00 - AM04:00" (Aimer Live Tour "DAWN", 2015.11.03)
16.	"After Rain" (Aimer Live Tour "DAWN", 2015.11.03)
17.	"Hoshi no Kieta Yoru ni" (Aimer Live Tour "DAWN", 2015.11.03)
18.	"LAST STARDUST" (Aimer Live Tour "DAWN", 2015.11.03)
19.	"Brave Shine" (Aimer Live Tour "DAWN", 2015.11.03)
20.	"DAWN" (Aimer Live Tour "DAWN", 2015.11.03)
21.	"Koutetsujou no Kabaneri" (Special Ending Movie)

== Credits ==
Adapted from Booklet.

=== Production ===
- Aimer – producer (tracks 1, 10, 11)
- Colin Brittain – programming, recording engineer, mixing engineer (tracks 1, 10, 11)
- Dick Beetham – mastering engineer (track 6)
- Fumiaki Unehara – assistant recording engineer (track 12)
- Hideki Kodera – recording engineer (track 5)
- Hideki Morioka – director, organizer (tracks 3, 4, 5, 7, 13)
- Hiroshi Hiranuma – recording engineer, mixing engineer (tracks 8, 9)
- Hiroyuki Sawano – producer (track 2)
- Keisuke Narita – assistant recording engineer (track 2)
- Kenji Tamai – producer (tracks 3, 4, 5, 7, 13)
- Kouzou Miyamoto – assistant recording engineer (track 2)
- Jamil Kazmi – director, organizer (tracks 1, 4, 10, 11, 13)
- Masahiro Tobinai – programming (tracks 3, 7)
- Masaki Mori - recording engineer (tracks 3, 4, 5, 7, 13), mixing engineer (track 5)
- Masayoshi Sugai – recording engineer, mixing engineer (track 6)
- Mitsunori Aizawa - recording engineer, mixing engineer, Pro Tools operator (track 2)
- Rui Momota – programming (track 4)
- Satoshi Kumasaka – mixing engineer (tracks 3, 4, 7, 13)
- Shogo Ohnishi – programming (tracks 5, 13)
- SukimaSwitch – producer (track 8)
- Takahiro Moriuchi – producer (tracks 1, 10, 11)
- Takahito Uchisawa – producer, programming (tracks 3, 4)
- Ted Jensen – mastering engineer (track 12)
- Tetsuro Sawamoto – assistant engineer (track 6)
- TK – producer, recording engineer, mixing engineer (tracks 9, 12), mastering engineer (track 9), programming (track 12)
- Yasushi Horiguchi – director (track 2)
- Yojiro Noda – producer (track 6)
- Yoshikazu Nagai – recording engineer (track 3, 7)
- Yuji Chinone – mastering engineer (track 1~5, 7, 8, 10, 11, 13)

=== Musicians ===
- Aimer – lead vocals (all tracks), handclaps (track 8)
- BOBO – drums (track 12)
- chelly – additional vocals (track 2)
- Colin Brittain – all instruments (tracks 1, 10, 11)
- Ichiro Yoshida – bass (track 3)
- Hanaregumi – guitar, chorus (track 6)
- Harutoshi Ito – guitar (track 2)
- Hiroo Yamaguchi – bass (tracks 9, 12)
- Hiroyuki Sawano – piano, keyboards, other instruments (track 2)
- Honoka Satou – strings (track 12)
- Katsuhiro Mafune – bass (track 6)
- Mao Abe – additional vocals (track 5)
- Makiko Amemiya strings – strings (track 9)
- Mamiko Hirai – piano (track 9)
- Masahiro Tobinai – other instruments (tracks 3, 7)
- Masami Horisawa – strings (track 12)
- Mikiyo Kikuchi – strings (track 12)
- Takahito Uchisawa – chorus, guitar, other instruments (track 3, 7)
- Takeshi Taneda – bass (track 6)
- Takuya Ohashi – chorus, guitar, handclaps (track 8)
- TK – chorus (track 12), guitar (tracks 9, 12)
- Tom Tamada – drums (tracks 8, 9)
- Toshino Tanabe – bass (track 2)
- Rui Momota – guitar, other instruments (track 4)
- Shintaro Tokita – chorus, handclaps, piano, other instruments (track 8)
- Shogo Ohnishi – guitar (track 13), other instruments (track 5, 13)
- Susumu Nishikawa – guitar (track 8)
- Yojiro Noda – piano, chorus (track 6)
- Yu "masshoi" Yamauchi – drums (track 2)
- Yuko Araki – drums (track 6)

=== Album Staff ===
- Arata Kato – photograph
- Daisuke Katsurada – executive producer
- Go Matsuda – art direction & design
- Hiroaki Sano – supervise
- Jun Yamaguchi – products coordination
- Kenji Tamai – executive producer
- Kenkichi Fukahara – artist management
- Mami Fujino – artist management
- Minaho Takahashi – hair & makeup
- Takeshi Tomaru – a&r
- Yasuhisa Ichikawa – artist management
- Yuuka Akashi – styling

== Charts ==
=== Album ===
Chart (2016)	Peak position
Japanese Hot Albums (Billboard)	3
Japanese Albums (Oricon)	2
South Korean International Albums (Gaon)	3

=== Singles ===
Title	Year	Peak positions	
Title	Year	JPN Oricon	JPN Billboard
"Ninelie"	2016	9	4
"Insane Dream"	2016	13	17
"Us"	2016	13	—
"Chouchou Musubi" (蝶々結び Butterfly Knot)	2016	10	8
"Falling Alone"	2016	—	—

== Sales and certifications ==
Region	Certification	Certified units/sales
Japan (RIAJ)	Gold	100,000^{^}
^{^} Shipments figures based on certification alone.

== Awards ==
Year	Award	Category	Work/Nominee	Result
2017	CD Shop Awards	Sub-Grand Prix	Daydream	Won
