= Dawn (Aimer album) =

DAWN

Studio album by Aimer
- Released: July 29, 2015
- Studio: Studio Device; Prime Sound Studio Form Japan
- Genre: Pop; rock
- Length: 55:45
- Label: Defstar Records
- Producer: Kenji Tamai; Yoko Kanno

Aimer chronology
Midnight Sun (2014)	DAWN (2015)	daydream (2016)

Singles from DAWN
- 1. "Dare ka, Umi wo" Released: September 03, 2014; 2. "broKen NIGHT" Released: December 17, 2014; 3. "Kimi wo Matsu" Released: February 22, 2015; 4. "Brave Shine" Released: June 03, 2015

DAWN is the third studio album released by Aimer under Defstar Records label. It was released in three versions: a limited CD+Blu-ray (Type-A), a limited CD+DVD edition (Type-B), and a regular CD only edition. The album reached #4 rank first week in Oricon rankings. It charted 26 weeks and totally sold more than 39,000 copies.

== Track listing ==
No.	Title	Lyrics	Music	Arrangement	Length
1.	"MOON RIVER" (prologue)	Johnny Mercer	Henry Mancini	Kenji Tamai; Masahiro Tobinai	2:00
2.	"Believe Be:leave"	aimerrhythm	Masahiro Tobinai	Kenji Tamai; Masahiro Tobinai	5:23
3.	"Kimi wo Matsu" (君を待つ; "I Will Wait for You")	aimerrhtyhm	Takahiro Furukawa	Kenji Tamai; Shogo Ohnishi	4:27
4.	"broKen NIGHT"	aimerrhythm	Takeo Asami	Kenji Tamai; Shogo Ohnishi	4:55
5.	"Noir! Noir!"	aimerrhythm	Kenji Tamai; DAIKI	Kenji Tamai; Shogo Ohnishi	4:03
6.	"Re:far"	aimerrhythm	Masahiro Tobinai	Kenji Tamai; Masahiro Tobinai	4:13
7.	"AM04:00"	aimerrhythm	give me wallets	MAURA	4:33
8.	"Dare ka, Umi wo" (誰か、海を。; "Someone, the Sea.")	Ichiko Aoba	Yoko Kanno	Yoko Kanno	4:54
9.	"LAST STARDUST"	aimerrhythm	Masahiro Tobinai	Kenji Tamai; Masahiro Tobinai	5:19
10.	"Brave Shine"	aimerrhythm	Hisashi Koyama	Kenji Tamai; Shogo Ohnishi	3:13
11.	"Kizuna" (キズナ; ''Bonds")	Hidenori Tanaka	Masahiro Tobinai	Kenji Tamai; Masahiro Tobinai	4:56
12.	"DAWN"	aimerrhythm	Kenji Tamai; Hiroyuki Akita	Kenji Tamai; Shunsuke Tsuri	5:10
13.	"MOON RIVER"	Johnny Mercer	Henry Mancini	Kenji Tamai; Masahiro Tobinai	1:59
Total length:					55:45

Blu-ray / DVD Tracklist
No.	Title	Length
1.	"Believe Be:leave" (Music Video)
2.	"Kimi wo Matsu" (Music Video)
3.	"broKen NIGHT" (Music Video)
4.	"Dare ka, Umi wo" (Music Video)
5.	"Brave Shine" (Music Video)
6.	"Hoshi no Kieta Yoru ni" (from Live at anywhere vol.23)

== Charts ==
=== Album ===
Chart (2015)	Peak position
Japanese Hot Albums (Billboard)	4
Japanese Albums (Oricon)	4
South Korean International Albums (Gaon)	3

=== Singles ===
Title	Year	Peak positions	
Title	Year	JPN Oricon	JPN Billboard
"Dare ka, Umi wo." (誰か、海を。Someone, The Sea.)	2014	—	41
"Broken Night"	2014	9	34
"Kimi wo Matsu" (君を待つ I Will Wait for You)	2015	—	—
"Brave Shine"	2015	4	4

== Sales ==
Region	Certification	Certified units/sales
Japan	—	32,008

== Awards and nominations ==
Year	Award	Category	Work/Nominee	Result
2015	Newtype Anime Awards	Best Theme Song	“Brave Shine” (from anime Fate/stay night: Unlimited Blade Works)	Won
2016	Music Jacket Awards	Grand Prize	Dawn	Nominated
