= Re: I Am =

Single by Aimer

from the album Midnight Sun
- Language: Japanese
- B-side: "Hoshi no Kieta Yoru ni / Kyō kara Omoide"
- Released: March 20, 2013
- Studio: Studio Sound Valley • Bunkamura Studio • Splash Sound Studio • Studio Device
- Genre: J-pop; rock
- Length: 28:20
- Label: Defstar
- Songwriter: Hiroyuki Sawano
- Producers: Hiroyuki Sawano; Kenji Tamai

Aimer singles chronology
"Anata ni Deawanakereba ~Kasetsutouka~" (2012)	"Re: I Am" (2013)	"StarRingChild" (2013)

Music video
- RE:I AM on YouTube

"Re: I Am" is the fifth single by Japanese singer Aimer, released on March 20, 2013 under Defstar Records. Written by Hiroyuki Sawano, the song was used as the theme song of episode 6 of the mecha anime OVA series Mobile Suit Gundam Unicorn, as well as the opening theme of episode 18 of the OVA's TV edit version Mobile Suit Gundam Unicorn RE:0096. The single peaked at No. 6 on the Oricon Singles Chart and No. 27 on the Billboard Japan Hot 100.

According to Sawano, he selected Aimer among a list of vocal candidates to record the song, as he was drawn by her husky voice. At the same time, he was concerned with her voice, which she injured in a vocal accident when she was 15. This was Aimer's first foray into rock-based music, as her prior releases were ballads. The song's title is an anagram of Aimer's name.

The song was written in English by Benjamin Anderson and mpi and re-recorded by Aimer in the 2014 SawanoHiroyuki[nZk]:Aimer collaboration album UnChild.

== Music videos ==
=== "Re: I Am" ===
The animated music video features a boy who spots an unidentified object crash into the Earth. Upon arriving at the crash site, he sees a black cat and befriends it. The cat leads him to a rocket ship, which he boards before it launches into space. The rocket suddenly explodes, leaving him and the cat floating in space as a female spirit approaches him.

=== "Kyō kara Omoide" ===
In this animated music video, a young girl waits by her window for her father to come home from work. One day, he gives her a teddy bear dressed like him. He leaves the house once she falls asleep. Days go by as he does not return home. The teddy bear's glasses fall off and break, causing the girl to cry, but her father returns to fix the glasses.

== Track listing ==
=== CD ===
No.	Title	Lyrics	Music	Arrangement	Length
1.	"Re: I Am"	Hiroyuki Sawano	Sawano	Sawano	5:44
2.	"Hoshi no Kieta Yoru ni" ((星の消えた夜に; "On the Night When the Stars Disappear"))	aimerrhythm	Masahiro Tobinai	Kenji Tamai; Tobinai	5:53
3.	"Kyō kara Omoide" ((今日から思い出; "Memories from Today"))	aimerrhythm	Tobinai	Tamai; Tobinai	5:06
4.	"Re: I Am" (instrumental)	Sawano	Sawano	Sawano	5:44
5.	"Hoshi no Kieta Yoru ni" (instrumental)	aimerrhythm	Tobinai	Tamai; Tobinai	5:53

=== DVD ===
- "Re: I Am" (Music video) – 5:44

== Charts ==
Chart performance for "Re: I Am"
Chart (2013)	Peak position
Japanese Oricon Singles Chart	6
Billboard Japan Hot 100	27
Billboard Japan Top Singles Sales	5
Billboard Japan Hot Animation	2

== Cover versions ==
- Yuko Suzuhana covered the song in her 2016 solo debut album Cradle of Eternity.
- Hiroko Moriguchi covered the song in her 2019 cover album Gundam Song Covers.
