= Brave Shine =

Single by Aimer

from the album DAWN
- Language: Japanese
- B-side: "Ophelia / Kimi wo Matsu -acoustic ver.- / AM03:00 -Live 'Midnight Sun' ver.- / 7-gatsu no Tsubasa -Live 'Midnight Sun' ver.-"
- Released: June 3, 2015
- Studio: Studio Device • Prime Sound Studio
- Genre: Alternative rock
- Length: 27:28
- Label: Defstar Records
- Songwriters: aimerrhythm; Hisashi Koyama
- Producer: Kenji Tamai

Aimer singles chronology
"Broken Night" (2014)	"Brave Shine" (2015)	"Ninelie" (2016)

Music video
- Brave Shine on YouTube

"Brave Shine" is the eighth single by Japanese singer Aimer, released on June 3, 2015 under Defstar Records. Written by Aimer (under her pen name "aimerrhythm") and Hisashi Koyama, the song was used as the second opening theme of the anime TV series Fate/stay night: Unlimited Blade Works. Originally, the series' second opening theme was intended to be "Last Stardust", composed also by Aimer. However, the staff did not find it fitting for the video's sequences and instead used "Brave Shine".

The single peaked at No. 4 on both Oricon's singles charts and Billboard Japan's Hot 100.

== Track listing ==
=== CD ===
All lyrics are written by aimerrhythm.

No.	Title	Music	Arrangement	Length
1.	"Brave Shine"	Hisashi Koyama	Kenji Tamai; Shogo Ohnishi	3:53
2.	"Ophelia"	Kōsuke Noma	MAURA: Tamai; Hajime Uchiyama	6:44
3.	"Kimi wo Matsu -acoustic ver.-" ((君を待つ -acoustic ver.-; "Waiting for You -acoustic ver.-"))	Takahiro Furukawa	Tamai; Ohnishi	4:07
4.	"AM03:00 -Live "Midnight Sun" ver.-"	give me wallets		6:14
5.	"7-gatsu no Tsubasa -Live "Midnight Sun" ver.-" (Shichi-gatsu no Tsubasa -Live "Midnight Sun" ver.- (7月の翼; "Wings of July" -Live "Midnight Sun" ver.-))	Rui Momota		4:55
6.	"Brave Shine (TV Size)"	Koyama	Tamai; Ohnishi	1:31

=== DVD ===
- "Brave Shine" (Music video) - 3:55

=== Limited Edition DVD ===
- Fate/stay night: Unlimited Blade Works Non-credit Opening Movie - 1:40

== Music video ==
The music video takes place in a post-apocalyptic world, where a couple roams across the desert as a dark spirit follows them. As the man carries the woman up a volcano, they confront the entity and reach the summit and embrace as the volcano erupts.

== Charts ==
Chart (2015)	Peak position
Japanese Oricon Singles Chart	4
Billboard Japan Hot 100	4
Billboard Japan Top Singles Sales	3
Billboard Japan Hot Animation	2

== Awards and nominations ==
Year	Award	Category	Work/Nominee	Result
2015	Newtype Anime Awards	Best Theme Song	"Brave Shine" (from anime Fate/stay night: Unlimited Blade Works)	Won
