= List of Fate/Stay Night: Unlimited Blade Works episodes =

Cover art for the first home media volume of Fate/stay night: Unlimited Blade Works

Fate/stay night: Unlimited Blade Works is an anime television series adapted from the Unlimited Blade Works storyline of the titular visual novel game by Type-Moon, which follows high school student Shirou Emiya, an amateur mage living in Fuyuki City, Japan, who is unwillingly dragged into the Fifth Holy Grail War, a secret magical tournament. In it, seven participants, known as "Masters", and their "Servants", reincarnated personifications of legendary heroes of history, fight in a battle royale for the Holy Grail, an omnipotent magical chalice that can fulfill any wish or desire for its victor. Shirou and his Servant Saber, are forced to team up with Rin Tohsaka, another Master in the Holy Grail War, but Shirou finds himself earning the strong dislike of Rin's mysterious Servant Archer, whose motivations are unknown.

The anime series is jointly produced by Aniplex, Notes, and Ufotable, the same studios that co-produced the 2011–12 anime adaptation for Fate/Zero. It is directed by Takahiro Miura, with music composed by Hideyuki Fukasawa; character designs by Tomonori Sudō, Hisayuki Tabata, and Atsushi Ikariya, based on the original designs by Takashi Takeuchi; and art, 3D, and photography directions by Koji Eto, Kōjirō Shishido, and Yūichi Terao, respectively. The first season ran from October 5 to December 28, 2014. The second season ran from April 5 to June 28, 2015. An advanced screening online premiered ahead of the televised broadcast on September 28, 2014, in several countries across the world, including Japan, the United States, France, Germany and South Korea. The series made its cable broadcast premiere on AXS TV in the United States and aired from February 13 to August 22, 2025, as part of Web3 company Azuki's Anime.com Hour programming block.

For the first season: the opening theme song is "Ideal White" performed by Mashiro Ayano, while the ending theme song is "Believe" performed by Kalafina. A cover version of "This Illusion" from the original visual novel was used as the ending theme for episode 12, performed by Lisa. For the second season: the opening theme song is "Brave Shine" performed by Aimer, while the ending theme song is "Ring Your Bell" performed by Kalafina. A remix of "Ring Your Bell", titled "Ring Your Bell (In the Silence)", was used as the ending theme for episode 15. "Last Stardust", performed by Aimer, was used as an insert song for episode 20.

== Series overview ==
Season	Episodes	Originally released	
Season	Episodes	First released	Last released
1	13 (Note: Number count total includes "Episode 0")	October 5, 2014	December 28, 2014
2	13	April 5, 2015	June 28, 2015

== Episodes ==
=== Season 1 (2014) ===
No. overall	No. in season	Title	Directed by	Written by	Animation directed by	Original release date	English air date
0	0	"Prologue"; Transliteration: "Purorōgu" (Japanese: プロローグ)	Takahiro Miura	Kazuharu Sato	Tomonori Sudō & Hisayuki Tabata	October 5, 2014	February 13, 2025
Rin Tohsaka awakens from a dream about her late father, Tokiomi. Arriving early at school, she realizes her clocks were mistakenly set an hour ahead. At school, she interacts with several students and staff, including Ayako Mitsuzuri, Sakura and Shinji Matou, Taiga Fujimura, Issei Ryūdō, and Shirou Emiya. That night, Rin prepares for the Fifth Holy Grail War and successfully summons the Servant Archer. Though initially dissatisfied with Rin, Archer is bound into absolute obedience by a Command Seal that Rin impulsively uses, which actually earns her Archer's respect. He also reveals he has no memory of his identity. The next day, Rin skips school to show Archer around the city, revealing she has no wish for the Holy Grail, only a desire to win. The following night, Rin detects a magical barrier forming at school. While attempting to destroy it, she's attacked by the Servant Lancer, prompting Archer to engage him in battle. Archer identifies Lancer as the Irish hero Cú Chulainn. A student witnesses the fight, and Lancer fatally wounds him. Rin discovers the victim is Shirou and revives him with magic. Knowing Lancer will retaliate, Rin and Archer rush to protect Shirou, but are attacked by Saber.
1	1	"Winter Days, a Fateful Night"; Transliteration: "Fuyu no Hi, Unmei no Yoru" (Japanese: 冬の日、運命の夜)	Takuya Nonaka	Kazuharu Sato	Tetsuto Satō & Takayuki Mogi	October 12, 2014	February 27, 2025
Shirou is awakened by his friend Sakura and shares breakfast with her and his legal guardian, Taiga. At school, Shirou fixes a heater for Issei. Issei praises Shirou's helpfulness but also warns him about being used by others. On his way back home, Shirou encounters Illyasviel von Einzbern, who urges him to summon a Servant. The next day, Shirou notices a bruise on Sakura's hand and suspects Shinji is abusing her. Ayako notes Shinji's recent aggression, while other students discuss an unrelated murder of a family of four. While visiting the crime scene, Shirou recalls being rescued by Kiritsugu Emiya during a fire a decade earlier. Inspired by Kiritsugu's ideals, Shirou devoted himself towards becoming a hero of justice. That evening, Shirou stays late at school and confronts Shinji, who denies harming Sakura but manipulates Shirou into staying to clean the school's archery dojo. That evening, Shirou witnesses Archer and Lancer fighting. Lancer spots Shirou and fatally stabs him with Gáe Bolg, but Rin revives him. When Lancer attacks him again at his home, Shirou flees to his shed and unknowingly summons Saber. She drives Lancer off, but clashes with Archer until Shirou halts the fight just as Rin reappears.
2	2	"The Curtain Goes Up"; Transliteration: "Kaimaku no Toki" (Japanese: 開幕の刻)	Directed by : Takashi Suhara; Storyboarded by : Keiichi Sasajima	Kazuharu Sato	Miyuki Ishizuka, Takuya Aoki & Shizuka Fujisaki	October 19, 2014	March 13, 2025
Rin informs Shirou that he has been chosen as a Master in the Holy Grail War and explains the basics of the conflict. When Shirou struggles to grasp the situation, Rin takes him to meet Kirei Kotomine, her legal guardian and the overseer of the war. At a church, Kirei explains that once selected, Masters cannot withdraw. Shirou learns that four previous Holy Grail Wars have occurred, with the most recent ending in tragedy a decade ago. Kirei recounts how an evil Master touched the Grail, triggering the devastating fire that Shirou survived. He also reveals that a good Master had initially won but was rejected by the Grail for refusing to fight, illustrating that noble intentions alone aren't enough. Though hesitant at first, Shirou accepts his role as a Master and agrees to fight alongside Saber in the Fifth Holy Grail War. Meanwhile, Archer advises Rin to attack now that Shirou is a legitimate Master. However, Rin, still feeling indebted to him for saving her life, decides to let him and Saber return home in peace. Their reprieve is however short-lived, as they're soon confronted by Illya, who is revealed to be the Master of the powerful Servant Berserker.
3	3	"The First Battle"; Transliteration: "Shosen" (Japanese: 初戦)	Directed by : Kei Tsunematsu; Storyboarded by : Takahiro Miura	Kazuharu Sato & Tatsuki Ichinose	Tomonori Sudō & Atsushi Ikariya	October 26, 2014	March 20, 2025
Illya introduces herself. Rin and Archer evaluate Berserker before Archer moves to a farther position so he can attack Berserker from a distance. Berserker attacks Saber, who is overwhelmed by his brute strength and agility. Archer and Rin attempt to provide support for Saber, but Berserker is unaffected by their strikes due to his Noble Phantasm, God Hand, which grants him automatic resurrection and immunity from lower-level attacks. Rin orders Shirou to run, but he remembers his agreement with Saber and follows them. As the fight progresses, Kirei is visited by Gilgamesh, as they both proclaim their intentions to witness the materialization of the Holy Grail. Meanwhile, Saber and Berserker's fight moves through a forest and into a local cemetery, where Rin tries to kill Illya, but Illya counters with several bird-shaped homunculi. Rin is rescued by Archer's attacks. While running towards Saber, Rin runs into Shirou. They watch as Saber eliminates Berserker, but he suddenly resurrects and regenerates himself using God Hand. Archer projects and fires a sword-shaped arrow at Berserker, which engulfs him in a massive explosion but also has no effect. Illya, impressed by Archer's strength, withdraws Berserker and flees. Moments later, Shirou suddenly begins vomiting blood.
4	4	"Finding the Will to Fight"; Transliteration: "Sen'i no Arika" (Japanese: 戦意の在処(ありか))	Takuya Nonaka	Kazuharu Sato	Tetsuto Satō	November 2, 2014	March 28, 2025
Shirou awakens uninjured at home, with Rin sitting beside him. Before departing, Rin warns that they'll become enemies the next time they meet. Shirou finds Saber in the dojo, where she explains that his self-healing magic accounts for his lack of injuries. She also outlines the structure of the seven Servants and the strategic value of concealing their true identities. Given his inexperience as a mage, Shirou agrees to not ask for her true name. The next morning, Shirou and Saber walk to school to deliver lunch for the archery club. Saber explores the grounds and has a tense encounter with school instructor Souichirou Kuzuki before Shirou intervenes. Ayako approaches Shirou and encourages him to return to the archery club. On their way back home, Shirou explains that Saber will be living with him temporarily. Taiga approves on the condition that she also stays, while Sakura becomes distressed by the arrangement. Meanwhile, Rin and Archer investigate a building reported to have a gas leak, discovering that it's the work of the Servant Caster, who absorbed the life force of those inside. Believing Caster resides at Ryuudou Temple, Rin prepares to act and tells Archer she'll kill Shirou if he interferes.
5	5	"Dancing After School"; Transliteration: "Hōkago ni Odoru" (Japanese: 放課後に踊る)	Directed by : Toshiyuki Shirai & Kenji Takahashi; Storyboarded by : Toshiyuki Shirai	Kazuharu Sato	Toshiyuki Shirai	November 9, 2014	April 4, 2025
Five years ago, Kiritsugu told Shirou about his dream of becoming a hero of justice. Shirou promised to fulfill that dream in his place, and Kiritsugu later died content. In the present, Shirou insists on going to school alone, despite Saber's objections. At school, Issei informs him that Ayako has gone missing and was last seen arguing with Shinji, who is now absent and unreachable. After school, Rin confronts Shirou and attacks him, demanding he surrender his remaining Command Seals. Before she can escalate, a scream interrupts them. They find an unconscious student whose mana has been drained. As Rin treats her, Shirou shields her from an incoming attack by the Servant Rider. He chases Rider into the woods but is nearly killed before Rin arrives and drives Rider off. Rin tends to Shirou's wounds and calls off their battle, taking him to her home to discuss the situation. There, they agree to form a temporary alliance to locate Rider and her Master. That night, Rin becomes furious after learning about Shirou's unconventional magical training. She criticizes Kiritsugu for raising Shirou as a father first rather than adhering to proper magecraft traditions, reflecting their differing values and approaches to magic.
6	6	"Mirage"; Transliteration: "Shinkirō" (Japanese: 蜃気楼)	Takuro Takahashi	Akira Hiyama	Yasuhisa Katō	November 16, 2014	April 11, 2025
On his way home, Shirou senses Archer following him. Archer surprises Shirou by expressing no desire for the Holy Grail, claiming Servants are merely tools and that he died without any regrets. After Archer leaves, Shirou returns home and learns from Taiga that Ayako was found alive and unharmed. He discusses the truce with Rin to Saber, which she approves of. The following day at school, Shirou detects a sigil in the library, which Rin disables. They investigate and discover multiple sigils enhancing a magical barrier over the school. As they prepare to leave school, Shinji confronts Shirou and reveals himself to be Rider's Master and the creator of the barrier. Declaring the Matō family's mage lineage, Shinji offers an alliance, but Shirou declines while also promising to stay silent. That night, Shirou awakens to find himself bound at Ryuudou Temple. Caster appears and admits to causing the city's "gas leaks" by draining people's life force, infuriating Shirou. Saber senses Shirou's absence and rushes to the temple, only to be stopped by the Servant Assassin, who reveals himself as swordsman Sasaki Kojirō, challenging her to a duel. Before Caster can steal Shirou's Command Seals, Archer intervenes, ready to battle her.
7	7	"Reward for the Fight to the Death"; Transliteration: "Shitō no Kotae" (Japanese: 死闘の報酬(こたえ))	Takashi Suhara	Akira Hiyama	Shunya Kikuchi & Miyuki Ishizuka	November 23, 2014	April 18, 2025
Outside Ryuudou Temple, Saber battles Assassin but is stunned to find she can't break through his defenses, despite her superior strength and agility. Inside, Caster reveals that she summoned Assassin using magecraft, violating the rules of the Holy Grail War. Archer arrives and confronts Caster, criticizing her methods before engaging in combat. He eventually lands a critical blow, prompting Assassin to end his duel with Saber using his ultimate technique, Swallow Reversal, a strike capable of hitting even a swallow mid-flight. Archer spares Caster, prioritizing Shirou's safety over killing her. Caster notes the similarities between Archer and Shirou's ideals, though both reject her offer to join forces. Despite Shirou's objections, Archer lets Caster escape, believing her eventual defeat is preferable to the broader devastation her victory would cause. Disgusted by Archer's willingness to allow further deaths, Shirou condemns his ideals. Archer, frustrated by Shirou's refusal to accept harsh realities, slashes him across the back. Shirou stumbles out of the temple and is rescued by Saber, who survived Assassin's deadly technique. As Archer pursues, Assassin intervenes and allows Shirou and Saber to flee. Later at home, Shirou asks Saber to train him in swordsmanship, determined not to lose to Archer again.
8	8	"Winter Days, Where the Heart Is"; Transliteration: "Fuyu no Hi, Kokoro no Shozai" (Japanese: 冬の日、心の所在)	Takuya Nonaka	Kazuharu Sato	Takayuki Mogi	November 30, 2014	April 25, 2025
After sparring, Saber notes that Shirou is mimicking Archer's techniques to refine his stance. Shirou arrives late to school and is ominously greeted by Shinji. During lunch, Rin forces Shirou to join her on the rooftop and reveals she used a Command Seal to stop Archer from killing him. She explains the Matō bloodline weakened over generations and admits she spared Shinji after learning he was a Master, believing his lack of skill posed little threat, an oversight that allowed another Master to act. Suddenly, Rider activates a powerful magical barrier that drains mana from everyone except Shirou and Rin. Attacked by skeletal Golems, Shirou summons Saber with a Command Seal. While Saber fights, Shirou and Rin head to the first floor to disable the barrier. Saber defeats several Golems and confronts Rider, stabbing her. However, Rider vanishes, revealed to be an illusion conjured by Caster. Meanwhile, Shirou and Rin discover Shinji beside the corpse of the real Rider, whose death causes the barrier to dissipate. Shinji refuses to identify Rider's killer and escapes. Assessing the damage, Rin notices Shirou's calm response to unconscious victims. When asked, Shirou admits he's used to seeing corpses, leaving Rin disturbed and but curious.
9	9	"The Distance Between Them"; Transliteration: "Futari no Kyori" (Japanese: 二人の距離)	Akihiko Uda	Akira Hiyama & Kazuharu Sato	Takuya Aoki	December 7, 2014	May 2, 2025
Archer arrives following the battle, with Rin informing him that Rider has been killed. At his home, Shirou allows Saber to sleep in his room so that she can prevent him from being taken by Caster again. Meanwhile, Shinji arrives at the church and begs Kirei to offer him shelter and protection. When Kirei discovers that Shinji was the first Master to lose his Servant, Shinji blames the uselessness of Rider. Realizing Shinji still has fighting resolve, Kirei tells him there is one Servant available for use. After clearing Issei of being Caster's Master, Shirou encounters Rin spying on Gilgamesh, who has been observing the Matō home. After Gilgamesh departs, Rin asks Shirou on his opinion about being adopted into another family. While eating dinner, Taiga tells Saber about Shirou and Kiritsugu during Shirou's childhood, commenting that they seemed to be polar opposites of each other due to their personalities. When Saber asks him why he wants to become a hero of justice, Shirou replies that it is because he looks up to them. While in his room alone, Shirou concludes that he only wants to follow in Kiritsugu's footsteps, but remembers from Archer's words that his ideals are flawed.
10	10	"The Fifth Contractor"; Transliteration: "Goninme no Keiyakusha" (Japanese: 五人目の契約者)	Directed by : Yūsuke Maruyama; Storyboarded by : Takahiro Miura	Tatsuki Ichinose & Kazuharu Sato	Yasuhisa Katō & Tetsuto Satō	December 14, 2014	May 9, 2025
Rin awakens from a dream about Archer's past. Later, she grows frustrated when Archer claims Caster would have made a better ally than Shirou. At school, Issei tells Shirou and Rin that Kuzuki is living at Ryuudou Temple with a mysterious woman rumored to be his fiancée. Suspecting Kuzuki is Caster's Master, Rin plans to test him with a nonlethal magical attack. That night, Rin, Shirou, and Saber wait at an abandoned gas station along Kuzuki's usual route. When he appears, Rin fires her spell at Kuzuki. Caster appears, confirming their suspicions. Shirou demands to know if Kuzuki condones Caster's attacks on civilians. Kuzuki coldly admits he doesn't care, revealing his past as a murderer. Rin attacks Caster to distract her, while Saber strikes Kuzuki, only to be overpowered by his magically enhanced fists. After Shirou is beaten down, he unexpectedly summons Archer's dual swords and repels Kuzuki. As Rin and Saber recover, Caster and Kuzuki retreat. Rin questions Shirou's ability and he explains that while trained in reinforcement magic, he successfully used projection magic for the first time. Meanwhile, Shinji meets his new Servant, Gilgamesh, who reveals a chilling plan to use the Grail to eradicate most of humanity.
11	11	"A Visitor Approaches Lightly"; Transliteration: "Raihōsha wa Karoyaka ni" (Japanese: 来訪者は軽やかに)	Directed by : Yūsuke Maruyama; Storyboarded by : Kenji Takahashi & Takashi Suhara	Kazuharu Sato	Mieko Ogata	December 21, 2014	May 16, 2025
After the fight, Shirou and Saber return home. Though visibly in pain and unsteady, Shirou hides the toll that using projection magic has taken on him. The next day at school, he learns that Kuzuki is absent due to a supposed illness. After school, Rin arrives at Shirou's home unannounced. Together with Saber, they devise a direct assault on Ryuudou Temple, though Rin and Saber worry that Caster may destroy the temple if cornered. That evening, Rin reflects in the courtyard admits that Shirou's home feels warmer than her own. She praises Shirou's kindness but also criticizes his selflessness, arguing that placing others' happiness above his own isn't right. She stays the night, warning that she plans to "punish" him tomorrow. Shirou proceeds to practice magic in the shed, where Saber finds him struggling with numbness on his left side. Archer arrives and recognizes it as symptoms caused by awakening long-dormant magic circuits through projection magic. After repairing Shirou's circuits, Archer explains that he once experienced the same pain. He warns Shirou that his ideals of saving everyone are naïve and ultimately doomed to fail. Shirou rejects Archer's cynicism, refusing to abandon his dream of becoming a hero of justice.
12	12	"The Final Decision"; Transliteration: "Saigo no Sentaku" (Japanese: 最後の選択)	Toshiyuki Shirai & Takuro Takahashi	Akira Hiyama & Kazuharu Sato	See note for the ADs (Note: Tomonori Sudō, Hisayuki Tabata, Takayuki Mogi, Mitsuru Obunai, Takuya Aoki, Keita Shimizu, Miyuki Ishizuka & Shunya Kikuchi)	December 28, 2014	May 23, 2025
To encourage Shirou to value his own happiness, Rin takes him on a date into town accompanied with Saber. Though Rin teases Shirou, he turns the tables by making her admit she stayed over out of genuine concern. On their way home, the trio is trapped in a magical barrier and ambushed by Caster and water Golems. Caster reveals she has taken Taiga hostage and demands Shirou surrender his magical circuits. Caster also taunts Shirou with knowledge of the fire he survived and claims she can summon the Holy Grail without further bloodshed by using Saber's mana. To save Taiga, Shirou gives up his Command Seals. Despite Saber's objections, Shirou orders her to stand down, allowing Caster to stab her with Rule Breaker and take control. Caster commands Saber to kill Rin, but Shirou takes the blow. Saber resists long enough for Archer to arrive and help Shirou, Rin, and Taiga escape. Shirou later awakens at Rin's house where he finds the red pendant she used to save his life. Meanwhile, Caster attacks Kirei at his church, demanding the location of the Lesser Grail. On a rooftop, Rin warns Shirou to stay out of the war or he will die.

=== Season 2 (2015) ===
No. overall	No. in season	Title	Directed by	Written by	Animation directed by	Original release date	English air date
13	1	"Time of Departure"; Transliteration: "Ketsubetsu no Toki" (Japanese: 決別の刻)	Directed by : Takuro Takahashi; Storyboarded by : Takahiro Miura	Kazuharu Sato	Takayuki Mogi, Miyuki Ishizuka & Hisayuki Tabata	April 5, 2015	May 30, 2025
Shirou returns home and reflects on the fire that drove his dream of becoming a hero of justice. At the church, Caster confronts the imprisoned Saber who resists her control. Kuzuki arrives and learns Caster acted on her own in recent attacks and now seeks the Lesser Grail. Meanwhile, Rin awakens from another dream about Archer. Investigating the church with Archer, she finds bloodstains and deduces Kirei may have survived Caster's assault. They confront Caster and Kuzuki, but to Rin's shock, Archer defends Caster. Archer claims Rin's flawed strategies would lead to failure and switches sides. Archer allows Caster, revealed to be Medea, to stab him with Rule Breaker and sever his bond with Rin. Kuzuki tries to kill Rin but Shirou appears and saves her. Archer intervenes and negotiates with Caster on the release of Shirou and Rin. As they walk home, Rin is disheartened by Archer's betrayal as Shirou comforts her and asserts that her ideals weren't wrong. Shirou returns the jewel pendant that he found at her house, telling her that he has another at home. When Rin asks why he risked his life for her, Shirou confesses his love. Flustered, Rin thanks him for saving her.
14	2	"The Princess of Colchis"; Transliteration: "Korukisu no Ōjo" (Japanese: コルキスの王女)	Takashi Suhara	Kazuharu Sato	Takuya Aoki, Mieko Ogata & Tomonori Sudō	April 12, 2015	June 5, 2025
Shirou tells Rin he will continue fighting in the Holy Grail War without a Servant. The two plan to team up with Illya, as Archer revealed Berserker's true identity to be Heracles, which could be a vital asset against Caster. Meanwhile, Caster recalls being summoned by Atrum Galliasta, who provided her inefficient mana. When she offered to gather it herself, Atrum, threatened by her superior skill, conspired to kill her with help from Kirei. Atrum contracted Lancer's Master to kill her, but before the plan could unfold, Caster destroyed Atrum's workshop. When Atrum used a Command Seal to force her to commit suicide, she nullified it with Rule Breaker and trapped him in a burning illusion which immolated him. Caster barely survived a subsequent ambush by Lancer only to be saved by Kuzuki, who became her new Master. In the present, Illya sends her maids Leysritt and Sella to retrieve Shirou and Rin at her villa. However, they are suddenly attacked by Shinji and Gilgamesh, who reveal Illya contains the Lesser Grail within her heart. When Sella and Leysritt try to protect Illya, Gilgamesh kills them using his Noble Phantasm, Gate of Babylon. Illya angrily commands Berserker to kill Gilgamesh.
15	3	"A Battle of Legend"; Transliteration: "Shinwa no Taiketsu" (Japanese: 神話の対決)	Directed by : Takuya Nonaka; Storyboarded by : Takahiro Miura	Kazuharu Sato	Tetsuto Satō	April 19, 2015	June 13, 2025
Ten years ago, Illya had a vision of her mother, Irisviel, who claimed Illya's father betrayed them during the Fourth Holy Grail War by rejecting the Grail. Illya initially denied this but realized it was true once he never returned. She also discovered a chamber filled with failed homunculi, created to support her role as the Lesser Grail. From their dying words, Illya learned she was also a homunculus. Illya later met Leysritt and Sella, who helped her summon Berserker. Though she initially rejected Berserker, after getting lost in snowy woods, he saved her from wolves of his own will and earned her trust. In the present, Illya and Berserker battle Gilgamesh, as Shirou and Rin secretly arrive. Gilgamesh reveals Berserker's Noble Phantasm, God Hand, grants him twelve lives, one for each of the Labours of Heracles, and begins exhausting them using his Gate of Babylon's endless weapons. At the mansion's entrance, Gilgamesh uses Enkidu's chains to restrain Berserker and impales him with a massive spear. He blinds and fatally wounds Illya, who crawls to Berserker. In his final act, Berserker breaks free and lunges but is slain. Illya dies peacefully, imagining Berserker beside her as Shirou watches in grief.
16	4	"Winter Days, the Form Wishes Take"; Transliteration: "Fuyu no Hi, Negai no Katachi" (Japanese: 冬の日、願いの形)	Directed by : Akihiko Uda; Storyboarded by : Tatsuki Ichinose	Tatsuki Ichinose	Hisayuki Tabata, Miyuki Ishizuka & Yuka Shiojima	April 26, 2015	June 20, 2025
As Gilgamesh tears out Illya's heart from her corpse, Shirou and Rin confront him and Shinji. Rin convinces Gilgamesh to leave after she threatens to kill Shinji and refuses to join their side. After burying Illya, Rin confronts Shirou about his ideals and tells him that he needs to value himself over others, otherwise he will break. Shirou refutes this by the example of being rescued by Kiritsugu a decade ago, something Shirou admires. Rin cites that Shirou will not truly understand happiness unless he lives for himself. Despite her argument, Shirou remains committed to his ideals. Later on, as they evaluate the power of Gilgamesh and conclude that Caster is still their top priority, the two are approached by Lancer who offers his assistance, to which they accept. Meanwhile, Archer learns that Kuzuki is helping Caster return to her original era once he obtains the Holy Grail. Archer later confronts Shirou, Rin, and Lancer as they arrive at the church. Lancer engages Archer to give Shirou and Rin time to breach the church. As they do so, Rin informs Shirou that there is only one red jewel pendant that exists in the world, which Archer already returned to her.
17	5	"The Dark Sword Bares Its Fangs"; Transliteration: "Anken, Kiba o Muku" (Japanese: 暗剣、牙を剥く)	Directed by : Ryūhei Aoyagi; Storyboarded by : Nozomu Abe & Shinsuke Yasuda	Kazuharu Sato	Shunya Kikuchi & Mieko Ogata	May 3, 2015	June 27, 2025
At the church, Caster questions Kuzuki's lack of desires despite having a goal. Shirou and Rin arrive to confront them. Meanwhile, Lancer battles Archer and dominates the fight. Archer mocks Lancer's honor, provoking him to unleash his Gáe Bolg. Archer narrowly blocks it with a magical barrier, using most of his strength and destroying the church. He then reveals to Lancer that his betrayal of Rin was simply a ruse to catch Caster off guard, impressing Lancer enough that he departs. Back at the church, Shirou and Rin struggle against Caster and Kuzuki. Suddenly, Archer ambushes them and launches swords at Kuzuki. Caster sacrifices herself to shield him from them and is fatally wounded. In her final moments, she tells Kuzuki her wish has already been fulfilled. Kuzuki explains to Archer that he must finish what he started after interfering with the Holy Grail War's normal rules and proceeds to fight him despite knowing he will almost certainly lose. Archer impales Kuzuki and a falling pillar crushes his body. As Shirou rushes to free the imprisoned Saber, Archer traps Rin in a cage of swords. Declaring himself to be a Guardian, he reveals his true objective is to kill Shirou.
18	6	"The Beginning of the Circle"; Transliteration: "Sono en wa Hajimari ni" (Japanese: その縁は始まりに)	Directed by : Takuya Nonaka; Storyboarded by : Tatsuki Ichinose	Akira Hiyama & Kazuharu Sato	Takayuki Mogi	May 10, 2015	July 4, 2025
Saber, though Masterless, vows to protect Shirou but is overpowered by Archer. Shirou steps in to fight, giving Rin the chance to form a new pact with Saber. With her strength restored, Saber subdues Archer, who mocks her wish to amend her own legacy. Archer activates his Noble Phantasm: Unlimited Blade Works, a Reality Marble that traps them all in a wasteland full of swords and gears. He launches swords at Saber but Shirou counters by summoning one of his own, destroying the attack and breaking the Reality Marble. A weakened Archer grabs Rin, intending to use her as an insurance policy against Shirou and Saber as he recuperates his strength for a day. Shirou challenges Archer to meet up again at Illya's villa to fight. Rin later awakens restrained in the villa's basement, where she confronts Archer about his past and identity as a Heroic Spirit. Shinji and Gilgamesh arrive to their location as Archer agrees to hand Rin over once he finishes off Shirou. Meanwhile, Shirou tells Saber to rescue Rin while he faces Archer, hinting that he now understands Archer's true identity. As they head to Illya's villa to free Rin and battle Archer, Lancer accompanies them.
19	7	"Idealism's End (The Answer)"; Transliteration: "Risō no Kotae" (Japanese: 理想の末路(こたえ))	Directed by : Yūsuke Maruyama; Storyboarded by : Takashi Suhara	Kazuharu Sato	Takuya Aoki & Tomonori Sudō	May 17, 2015	July 11, 2025
Shirou, Saber, and Lancer arrive at Illya's villa and confront Archer, who reveals Rin's pendant was the catalyst for his summoning. As Lancer rushes to rescue Rin, Saber demands to know why Archer wants to kill Shirou. Archer explains he once pursued the ideal of becoming a hero of justice, but became disillusioned after being forced as a Guardian to kill others to save many, realizing his ideals were ultimately shallow. Saber reveals she is King Arthur, who hoped to use the Holy Grail to reverse her decision to become king, believing her rule led to Britain's downfall. Though they differ in how they uphold their ideals, both reflect on the cost of their choices. Archer finally admits he is Shirou's future self from an alternate world. Meanwhile, Shinji attempts to assault Rin but Lancer intervenes and stops him. Kirei arrives, revealing himself to be Lancer's Master and Rin's father's murderer. He orders Lancer to kill Rin, intending to use her as the Holy Grail's vessel. When Lancer refuses, Kirei forces him to commit suicide by using a Command Seal. Elsewhere, Archer throws Shirou a sword and demands that he kill himself, but Shirou refuses and prepares to fight him.
20	8	"Unlimited Blade Works."	Takashi Suhara	Kazuharu Sato	Takayuki Mogi, Miyuki Ishizuka & Hisayuki Tabata	May 24, 2015	July 18, 2025
Shirou struggles to withstand Archer's relentless strikes, but he gradually grows stronger with each clash. Meanwhile, Kirei prepares to remove Rin's heart despite Shinji's protest. However, before Kirei is able to do so, the mortally wounded Lancer impales and kills him before collapsing again. Seizing on this, Shinji once again attempts to assault Rin, but Lancer gets back up to drive him off. Freeing Rin, Lancer quips about his regret that he could not be her Servant. Sharing a final farewell, he sets the room ablaze, burning alongside Kirei's corpse. Shirou and Archer's duel escalates as Archer unleashes Unlimited Blade Works, gradually overwhelming Shirou. With every clash of swords, Shirou get more glimpses into Archer's memories, seeing the future that awaits him if he continues to pursue his ideals. Shirou falters and gets struck down before being left near death. As he lies on the ground, he reflects on Archer's regrets and Kiritsugu's act of saving him during the fire a decade ago. Concluding that his ideals are not wrong, Shirou regains his conviction. At that moment, Avalon, the scabbard hidden inside him, activates and heals his wounds. Reinvigorated, Shirou rises back up and declares that he will defeat Archer.
21	9	"Answer" (Note: Stylized in all lowercase)	Directed by : Takuro Takahashi; Storyboarded by : Takahiro Miura	Kazuharu Sato	Mieko Ogata, Shunya Kikuchi, Yuka Shiojima & Hisayuki Tabata	May 31, 2015	July 25, 2025
The battle between Shirou and Archer rages on as Archer condemns Shirou's ideals. When Shirou refuses to falter, Archer realizes defeating him is meaningless. Shirou's new-found resolve begins to overwhelm Archer's Unlimited Blade Works. Seizing on an opening, Shirou charges forth and wounds Archer just as the Reality Marble collapses and Rin arrives. However, Gilgamesh also appears and impales Archer with three swords from his Gate of Babylon. Declaring his hatred for imitations, he unleashes a sword barrage as Archer seemingly sacrifices himself to shield Shirou from harm. Saber confronts Gilgamesh, demanding to know why he has returned for another Holy Grail War. Gilgamesh reveals that when the Fourth War's Grail was destroyed, he bathed in its contents and gained a physical body. Gilgamesh goes on to elaborate that the Grail is not a wish-granting device, but a vessel for curses. Disgusted with humanity's complacency, he intends to use the newest Grail to eradicate mankind and reign over its survivors. When flames from Lancer's fire spread across the castle, Gilgamesh departs and encounters Shinji outside. Learning of Kirei's death and Rin's escape from him, Gilgamesh implants Illya's heart into Shinji, transforming him into a grotesque impure vessel for the Grail.
22	10	"Winter Days, a Long Way Home"; Transliteration: "Fuyu no Hi, Tōi Ieji" (Japanese: 冬の日、遠い家路)	Takuya Nonaka	Kazuharu Sato	Masatoshi Tsuji & Takayuki Mogi	June 7, 2015	August 1, 2025
Retreating to Shirou's home, he, Saber, and Rin resolve to avenge Archer and stop Gilgamesh by destroying the Holy Grail. Using familiar spirits, Rin discovers the Grail is being summoned at Ryuudou Temple. She explains that Shinji, as the only other mage in the war, must serve as the substitute vessel since Illya was meant to become the Lesser Grail. While devising a strategy, Rin realizes Archer alone could have countered Gilgamesh, as his ability to replicate any weapon neutralized Gilgamesh's arsenal. Rin concludes that Shirou must master Unlimited Blade Works to stand a chance. However, lacking the sufficient mana, Shirou cannot achieve this alone. Rin improvises by performing a ritual to transplant her Magic Crest into him, allowing Shirou share her much larger mana reserve. During the ritual, Shirou has a glimpse into Rin's memories, including the moment she first fell in love with him after seeing him practicing high jump, leaving her flustered. Later that night, Shirou encounters Saber wandering his home. She thanks him for guiding her towards her dream and makes him promise to survive the upcoming battle along with Rin. Gilgamesh completes his delivery of Shinji to Ryuudou Temple and prepares to summon the Grail.
23	11	"Incarnation"; Transliteration: "Kengen" (Japanese: 顕現)	Directed by : Takahiro Miura & Masashi Takeuchi; Storyboarded by : Takahiro Miura	Kazuharu Sato	Tetsuto Satō, Takuya Aoki & Miyuki Ishizuka	June 14, 2015	August 8, 2025
Shirou and Rin plan to storm Ryuudou Temple to rescue Shinji while Saber battles Gilgamesh and destroys the Holy Grail. Saber admits she can only unleash Excalibur once, since most of Rin's mana is now tied to Shirou. At the temple, Shirou and Rin come across Shinji's grotesque mutation, with black ooze pouring from the Grail and forming a vast poisonous lake around him. They are confronted by Gilgamesh, who explains his disdain for modern humanity and that too many live without any purpose. Meanwhile, Saber encounters Assassin at the main gate. Despite Caster's defeat, he continues to remain bound to the world due to the temple acting as his anchor. Assassin confesses he is not Sasaki Kojirō, but an unnamed swordsman resembling him, and desires to conclude their duel. Shirou beings clashing with Gilgamesh as the Grail spews curses that embody mankind's malice. Rin reaches the Grail and pulls Shinji out, causing it to seek Gilgamesh as its replacement vessel. Gilgamesh counters the Grail with his ultimate Noble Phantasm, Ea, which overwhelms both the Grail and Shirou. Meanwhile, Assassin uses Swallow Reversal again against Saber. She unhides Excalibur's blade, evades the strike and fatally wounds him, ending their duel.
24	12	"Unlimited Blade Works"; Transliteration: "Mugen no Kensei" (Japanese: 無限の剣製)	Toshiyuki Shirai	Kazuharu Sato	Takayuki Mogi, Shunya Kikuchi & Yuka Shiojima	June 21, 2015	August 15, 2025
Gilgamesh mocks Shirou's ideals after incapacitating him. Saber arrives to protect him, but Shirou orders her to rescue Rin. Realizing the true nature of his power, Shirou activates Unlimited Blade Works, countering Gilgamesh's Gate of Babylon with endless replica swords. Saber confronts the Holy Grail, which is revealed to be the corrupted Angra Mainyu. She discovers Rin and Shinji trapped within and, due to her Command Seal order, unwillingly prepares to destroy Angra Mainyu with Excalibur despite Rin being in direct fire. As Rin begins to accept her demise, Archer's voice reprimands her for giving up. A barrage of swords strike Angra Mainyu, freeing her and Shinji. Relieved Rin escaped, Saber unleashes Excalibur, annihilating both Angra Mainyu and the Grail. As Saber fades, she admits she would have liked to remain with Shirou and Rin. Inside Unlimited Blade Works, Shirou overwhelms Gilgamesh, severing his arm before he can use Ea. Gilgamesh survives but is immediately dragged toward the Grail's abyss. He binds Shirou with Enkidu to avoid being sucked in but Archer intervenes, striking Gilgamesh before he is consumed. Archer bids Rin farewell and asks her to care of Shirou. As Shirou and Rin reunite, they walk away a couple.
25	13	"Epilogue"; Transliteration: "Epirōgu" (Japanese: エピローグ)	Directed by : Takahiro Miura & Masashi Takeuchi; Storyboarded by : Takahiro Miura	Ufotable	Tomonori Sudō, Hisayuki Tabata & Takuya Aoki	June 28, 2015	August 22, 2025
Two years following the Fifth Holy Grail War, Shirou and Rin reside together in London while studying at the Mage's Association's Clock Tower. Shirou apprentices under Rin as both her partner and protector, but still wrestles on how to follow his ideals without repeating Archer's path. Rin loses a duel to their neighbor and classmate, Luviagelita Edelfelt, whose open flirting with Shirou fuels Rin's jealousy. Later, Rin takes Shirou to Glastonbury, the resting place of King Arthur, so he can give a proper goodbye to Saber. On their return to London, Shirou recalls high school graduation and the events that led here. The next day, Shirou encounters Waver Velvet, unbeknownst to him a veteran of the Fourth Holy Grail War. Waver challenges Shirou's choice to pursue magic, but Shirou declares his resolve and dedicates himself towards becoming a hero of justice. Though Waver quietly condones it as foolish, he admits it has merits. Shirou tells Rin he has rejected the Association's offer, affirming with his unchanging ideals. Despite his decision, Rin vows to stay by his side. In the epilogue, Archer reflects within Unlimited Blade Works, regretting the path he took but also affirming that his ideals were never wrong.

== OVA ==
No.	Title	Directed by	Written by	Animation directed by	Original release date
1	"Sunny Day"	Takahiro Miura	Takahiro Miura	Tomonori Sudō	October 7, 2015
In an alternate, "good" scenario during the final battle, Rin is able to save Saber from fading away by extending their pact and turning her into her familiar. Having fallen unconscious during the battle, Shirou wakes up back at his home and initially believes Saber to have disappeared. However, he is surprised to see her alive and well in the apartment dojo. Rin enters and congratulates everyone for their victory in the Holy Grail War. While the three are out in the city, Rin explains how she managed to save Saber to Shirou, and adds that they will need to work together to sustain Saber with mana to ensure she stays. Shirou argues that Saber became a Servant in exchange for the Holy Grail and that she should be set free now that it is gone. However, Saber assures Shirou that she is staying out of her own volition because she wanted to stay with him and Rin, and because she wanted to find an answer to her own ideals after Archer criticized them. Rin then decides to further train Shirou in magic, while Saber trains him in her combat techniques.

== Home media release ==
=== Japanese ===
Aniplex (Japan – Region 2/A)
Volume		Episodes	Release date	Ref.
Season 1	1	0	November 26, 2014	
Season 1	2	1	December 24, 2014	
Season 1	3	2–4	January 7, 2015	
Season 1	4	5–7	January 28, 2015	
Season 1	5	8–10	February 25, 2015	
Season 1	6	11–12	March 25, 2015	
Season 2	7	13–15	May 27, 2015	
Season 2	8	16–18	June 24, 2015	
Season 2	9	19–21	July 22, 2015	
Season 2	10	22–23	August 26, 2015	
Season 2	11	24–25	September 30, 2015	
Box Set	I	0–12	March 25, 2015	
Box Set	II	13–25 + OVA	October 7, 2015	

=== English ===
Aniplex of America (North America – Region 1/A)
Season	Episodes	Release date	Ref.
1	0–12	August 25, 2015	
2	13–25 + OVA	February 16, 2016	
Box Set	0–25 + OVA	July 14, 2020	
