= List of Fate/Stay Night characters =

Characters of the visual novel Fate/Stay Night as seen in the Unlimited Blade Works (2014–15) anime series: Saber (top left), Rin Tohsaka (top right), Gilgamesh (middle right), Caster and Assassin (bottom right), Shirō Emiya (middle bottom), Archer (center), Illya (bottom left), Berserker and Lancer (middle left).

The main cast of Fate/Zero. From left to right: Kiritsugu Emiya, Waver Velvet, Ryūnosuke Uryū (top), Saber, Irisviel von Einzbern (center), and Gilgamesh (bottom).

The Fate/Stay Night (Japanese: フェイト/ステイナイト) adult visual novel features an extensive cast of characters created by Kinoko Nasu and Takashi Takeuchi of Type-Moon, with some of whom are classified as Servants with special combat abilities. The cast have appeared mainly in three anime television series adaptations (Fate/Stay Night, Fate/Stay Night: Unlimited Blade Works and its prequel Fate/Zero) with a movie trilogy adaptation (Fate/Stay Night: Heaven's Feel) produced by Studio Deen and Ufotable respectively, and its visual novel sequel, Fate/Hollow Ataraxia. A Fate/Stay Night: Unlimited Blade Works animated film was released prior to its TV series.

== Creation and conception ==
When Japanese author Kinoko Nasu wrote the Fate/Stay Night novel in college, he intended for Shirou and Saber to be the only couple. In his early drafts, the series' heroine, Saber was a man, and the protagonist was a girl with glasses. This early draft was later embodied in the short original video animation (OVA) Fate/Prototype, which was released with the final volume of the Carnival Phantasm OVA series. Nasu had set the project aside, and went on to found Type-Moon with artist Takashi Takeuchi. After the success of their first visual novel Tsukihime in 2000, Type-Moon transitioned from a dōjin soft organization to a commercial organization. In the beginning, Nasu was worried that because the main character was a girl, the story might not work as a bishōjo game. Takeuchi suggested switching the protagonist's and Saber's genders to fit the game market.

The novel Makai Tensho influenced Nasu to write a fantasy story in which famous heroic personalities from all over the world would take part. The original idea was limited to the prototype of the Fate arc, where the main characters were the female master and her Servant Saber (the embodiment of King Arthur as a man). According to Nasu, this version contained elements of 1980s romance and ideas of transformations to world order, while the final version focuses on changes within people and has other purposes for using the Holy Grail. About a third of the scenario of the future Fate arc (up to the battle with Sasaki Kojiro) was completed at that time, but for several personal reasons, Nasu could not write further for more than ten years. Scenes from the original visual novel that show Shirou having sexual intercourse with the heroines are commonly censored. According to the website Kotaku, Shirou's intercourse with Sakura has become an Internet meme that replaced Sakura's nudity with multiple images.

Writer Gen Urobuchi was pitched a prequel of Fate/Stay Night by Takeuchi, Nasu was amazed by Urobuchi and felt despite being unable to work on Fate/Stay Night due to illness, Urobuchi would write an interesting story. Ideas like Saber being lectured by Gilgamesh and Alexander the Great gave him a bigger impact. When starting the project for Fate/Zero, Nasu decided to give Urobuchi complete freedom for Kiritsugu's characterization. In Fate/Stay Night, Saber explains she had brief interactions with Kiritsugu Emiya which led to the creation of the character of Irisviel. As Kiritsugu's wife, Irisviel plays the role of facilitating communication between these two, who do not talk to each other. The distanced and ultimately dark relationship between Kiritsugu and Saber caused by the former's actions in the story led Urobuchi and Nasu to change some early drafts in the story, including the addition of Kiritsugu adopting Shirou. These changes were to create a more coherent relationship between Saber and Shirou Emiya in the original visual novel. Urobuchi had no issues writing the main characters' ideologies.

== Main characters ==
=== Shirou Emiya ===
Voiced by: Noriaki Sugiyama, Junko Noda (young) (Japanese); Sam Riegel (Fate/Stay Night, UBW film), Bryce Papenbrook (UBW TV, Heaven's Feel film), Mona Marshall (Young Shirō in UBW TV) (English)

Shirou Emiya (衛宮 士郎, Emiya Shirō) is a good-hearted and honest teenager who always enjoys helping others. However, Shirō is a deeply scarred human being orphaned after a fire destroyed part of his hometown when he was seven and caused him to lose all memory of the first seven years of his life. He was saved by Kiritsugu Emiya, who adopted him and named him Shirō after discovering that the boy could not recall his real name. He has no interest in the Holy Grail and instead despises it. However, he is determined to win the Holy Grail War with Saber, for he hopes his efforts will ensure that another disaster like the Fuyuki fire will never occur again. The main plot of Fate/Stay Night focuses on his ideal and the three different ways he approaches it.

=== Saber / Artoria Pendragon ===
Voiced by: Ayako Kawasumi (Japanese); Kate Higgins (Fate/Stay Night), Michelle Ruff (UBW film, Fate/Apocrypha), Kari Wahlgren (Zero, UBW TV, Heaven's Feel film) (English)

The main heroine of the Fate route and the mascot of the franchise, Saber is an honorable swordsman whose true identity is the King of Knights Artoria Pendragon (アルトリア・ペンドラゴン, Arutoria Pendoragon) who sought the Holy Grail to prevent the events that doomed her homeland with someone else ruling Britain in her stead. She was previously Kiritsugu Emiya's servant during the Fourth Holy Grail War. Stunned to discover that the legendary King Arthur is a young woman, Kiritsugu refused to speak to her directly since her summoning, which Saber initially believes is because he believes the fact that she is a woman makes her inadequate. However, Irisviel later suggests Kiritsugu's anger towards Saber is out of the belief that he could not accept the decisions Saber made or allowed to be made in life yet he could not justify his reasons for why he believed she was wrong. Because of their incompatible methods, Kiritsugu arranges Saber to serve as Irisviel's bodyguard, while she questions her master's tactics before being forced into attempting to destroy the Holy Grail. Losing her memory in the process, Saber becomes Shirō's Servant for the Fifth Holy Grail War. Saber acts coldly and suppressing her emotions to focus on her goals. Saber is frustrated by Shirō's "protective" tendencies, believing his erratic and reckless behavior will jeopardize their chances of winning the Holy Grail War services as a Heroic Spirit.

=== Rin Tohsaka ===
Voiced by: Kana Ueda (Japanese); Mela Lee (English)

The main heroine of the UBW route, Rin Tohsaka (遠坂 凛, Tōsaka Rin) is a high school girl who barely talks to other students in her school and exhibits a desire to be left alone, as exemplified by her tendency to stay on the school's rooftop, away from the rest of the students. She is also secretly a Mage, and a Master in the Fifth Holy Grail War. Rin is reared as the successor to her family's magecraft, instructed by her father, Tokiomi Tohsaka, to prioritize sorcery over her own interests. When she was young, Rin was separated from her sister Sakura, who was given to the Matou family for adoption. After her father is killed in the Fourth Holy Grail War, Rin perfects her sorcery with some guidance from her guardian, Kirei Kotomine.

=== Sakura Matou ===
Voiced by: Noriko Shitaya (Japanese); Sherry Lynn (Fate/stay night, UBW film), Cristina Vee (UBW TV, Heaven's Feel film) (English)

The main heroine of the Heaven's feel route, Sakura Matou (間桐 桜, Matō Sakura) is a first-year high school student and the younger sister of Shinji Matou. After Shirou's father, Kiritsugu, died, Sakura often visits Shirou's home to help him with his daily chores. Though Shinji is from a sorcerer family, he asserts that she does not know her family's craft or history. Sakura is outwardly timid but possesses great magical strength. She has a long-standing crush on Shirou Emiya. Sakura plays a minor part in the Fate and Unlimited Blade Works routes, being nothing more than a dutiful kouhai (junior student) who is always there to help Shirou in both routes. However, in the Heaven's Feel route, she serves as the lead heroine and vastly expands on her backstory. She is revealed to be the biological sister of Rin Tohsaka and was adopted away to the Matou family ostensibly to become the family's heir since Shinji was incapable of magecraft. In the anime-original storyline, Sakura is kidnapped by Caster as a sacrifice to summon the Holy Grail due to her possessing latent magic circuits. During the rescue attempt, she and Rin are confirmed to be sisters who were separated when they were very young.

=== Kirei Kotomine ===
Voiced by: Jouji Nakata (Japanese); Jamieson Price (Fate/Stay Night, UBW film, credited as Taylor Henry), Crispin Freeman (Zero, UBW TV, Heaven's Feel film) (English)

Kirei Kotomine (言峰 綺礼, Kotomine Kirei) is a priest ostensibly acting as the impartial overseer of the Holy Grail War under an agreement between the Mages' Association and the Holy Church. He inherited the position from his father, Risei Kotomine. Due to his experience as an elite assassin for the Church, Kirei is an expert practitioner in Chinese martial arts whose proficiency is magnified by his enormous physical strength and numerous Command Seals. He ultimately emerges as one of the series' main antagonists upon revealing he has been manipulating the Masters into supplying the Grail with enough energy to unleash Angra Mainyu upon the world.

=== Kiritsugu Emiya ===
Voiced by: Rikiya Koyama, Miyu Irino (childhood) (Japanese); Kirk Thornton (Fate/stay night), Matthew Mercer (Zero, UBW TV), Marin Miller (childhood) (English)

Kiritsugu Emiya (衛宮切嗣, Emiya Kiritsugu) is Shirō's adoptive father, who died before the events of Fate/Stay Night and is only seen in flashback, and the biological father of Illyasviel von Einzbern. He is the protagonist of Fate/Zero and known as the Mage Slayer for his unconventional methods of killing. Born in Fuyuki City, Kiritsugu was raised on Alimango Island by his father Norikata Emiya, a magus who specialized in time magic. But Kiritsugu's life took a nasty turn when his friend Shirley, a local girl working as his father's aide, accidentally got vampirized and his hesitance to kill her resulted in the entire island being compromised. Marrying into the Einzbern family, Kiritsugu served as their representative in the Fourth Holy War as Saber's Master during the Fourth Holy Grail War with the intention of using the Holy Grail to wish for world peace. But Kiritsugu discovered that the Grail had become corrupted and attempted to destroy it by using a Command Spell on Saber, which devastated the surrounding area and inflicted him with a curse that would shorten his lifespan. His decision to destroy the Grail was regarded as a betrayal to the Einzberns, who cast him out from their ranks and prevented from him ever contacting Illya again.

=== Irisviel von Einzbern ===
Voiced by: Sayaka Ohara (Japanese); Bridget Hoffman (English)

Irisviel von Einzbern (アイリスフィール・フォン・アインツベルン, Airisufīru fon Aintsuberun) is the main heroine of the story and Kiritsugu's wife. She is a homunculus prototype created by the Einzbern family with the idea of giving birth to an ultimate homunculus. Like many of the Einzberns, she is skilled in alchemy. Irisviel serves as Saber's proxy Master, since Kiritsugu believes that he and Saber are incompatible. Due to possessing the inborn knowledge and reasoning of homunculi, hindsights gleaned from the 1000 years of history of the Einzbern as well only having nine years of life-experience, she has both the elegance of a lady and the innocence of a child. Her true purpose in the War is as the vessel of the Holy Grail itself. When four or more Servants are killed, she will manifest as the Grail, losing fully her humanity and sense of self in the process.

Created by Jubstacheit von Einzbern, the eighth head of the Einzbern family, she originally saw herself only as a tool to summon the Holy Grail. Upon first contact with Irisviel in the Einzbern residence in Germany, Kiritsugu noted that she had no instinct for self-preservation and expressed doubts about Irisviel's suitability as the Grail to Jubstacheit. In response, Jubstacheit threw Irisviel into a junkyard for rejected homunculi, a dangerous place filled with monsters and spirits, reasoning that if Irisviel could not even survive a night there alone, he would accept Kiritsugu's criticism and furnish him a new homunculi. In response, Kiritsugu rescued Irisviel and decided to give her a sense of self-preservation by personally educating her and teaching her what it meant to be a human. Eventually, they fell in love with each other. Wanting to show Kiritsugu that there could be a future for them after her fated death, she bears Kiritsugu a daughter, Illyasviel von Einzbern. They live together for nine years in total before departing to Japan for the War.

While approving of Kiritsugu's ideal and willing to sacrifice herself for its sake, she does not truly understand that ideal, but only wishes to walk the same path as her beloved. However, in order not to burden Kiritsugu, she decides to behave as a woman who would die for that same ideal rather than a woman that would die for her husband. Her Magecraft involves the creation and forging of matter, as well as its applications. In terms of magical ability, she is stronger than Kiritsugu. Her weapons are thin, long and flexible wires, which she uses to produce an instantaneous homunculus with alchemy that attacks the enemy while changing itself into numerous shapes. She may also use her weapon to immobilize her target.

=== Bazett Fraga McRemitz ===
Voiced by: Hitomi Nabatame (Fate/tiger colosseum, Fate/unlimited codes, Carnival Phantasm, Fate/kaleid liner Prisma Illya (anime), and Fate/Hollow Ataraxia (PSVita))

Bazett Fraga McRemitz (バゼット・フラガ・マクレミッツ, Bazetto Furaga Makuremittsu) is a mage from the Knights of the Red Branch sent by the Mage's Association to fight the Fifth Holy Grail War, born in Ireland as a descendant of old mage family and the protagonist of Fate/hollow ataraxia. She was the original master of Lancer who originally summoned him (her childhood hero), but was betrayed by her old colleague Kotomine and had her left arm with its Command Seals stolen. She was left for dead before she was discovered by Avenger, who created the time loop inside of Bazett's mind, so that she could stay alive from her fatal injuries. Bazett can directly fight and defeat Servants due to her family's combat-based magecraft and her ancestral Noble Phantasm: the sacred dagger Fragarach, which reverses time so that it always strikes first in response to her opponent's ultimate attack. She is mentioned very briefly in Fate/Stay Night but does not make an appearance.

=== Archer ===
Voiced by: Junichi Suwabe (Japanese); Liam O'Brien (Fate/Stay Night, UBW film), Kaiji Tang (UBW TV, Heaven's Feel film) (English)
Archer (アーチャー, Āchā) is the Servant of Rin Tohsaka, and serves as the servant protagonist of the Unlimited Blade Works route, but he also serves an antagonistic role for part of the route. He is sarcastic and cynical, considering Shirō's "wanting to save everyone" mentality as naïve and impossible. Archer's real identity is Shirō Emiya from one of the possible future worlds. He is the winner of the Fifth Holy Grail War in his world. Later, Archer made a pact with the world to gain more power to pursue his goal of becoming "the ally of justice," indiscriminately killing all "evil" people regardless of their circumstances or what may result from their deaths. He was eventually framed for starting a war by an unknown group and executed by the fearful public. Unlike the other Servants, Archer is a Counter Guardian, a supernatural being who resides outside time and space. The Counter Guardians have one mission; to stop any event that would cause humanity's extinction by killing everyone involved. This life of endless killing drove Archer mad with grief, and he sought to end his eternal existence and return to nothingness. The jewel Archer owns is the actual catalyst used for his summoning rather than the one Rin still has at the time of his summoning. He has taken the basics of magic to their absolute maximum to combat-ready, creating a small but reliable skillset for himself. Though Projection is normally ineffective at creating durable or powerful artifacts, Archer's unique approach to this craft enables him to materialize enormously powerful and accurate copies of the images recorded in his mind. All of his Projection abilities come from his Reality Marble, Unlimited Blade Works: Infinite Creation of Swords (無限の剣製(アンリミテッドブレードワークス), Anrimiteddo Burēdo Wākusu), which manifests itself instead as a desert littered with swords with monolithic black gears rotating in the smog-filled sky above.
In the Fate route, he is defeated by Berserker while buying time for Rin, Shirō, and Saber to escape. In the Unlimited Blade Works route, after Shirō refuses to abandon the ideal to save everyone, Archer seeks to kill Shirō to prevent him from becoming like himself and ending his own existence as a Counter Guardian. Shirō defeats him later but survives long enough to deliver the finishing blow to Gilgamesh and save Rin and Shinji from the Grail's birth canal. In the "Heaven's Feel" route, Shirō chooses to save Sakura over society at large, effectively abandoning his "allies of justice" idealism. Archer's dream is fulfilled, and he continues his mission to protect Shirō and his friends. Later, Archer is mortally wounded in an engagement against True Assassin, Saber Alter, and The Shadow. He survives long enough to have Kirei Kotomine surgically graft his left arm onto Shirō, who lost his arm in that same battle.

=== Rider ===
Voiced by: Yuu Asakawa (Japanese); Karen Strassman (Fate/Stay Night, UBW film), Melissa Fahn (UBW TV, Heaven's Feel film series) (English)
Rider (ライダー, Raidā) – Medusa (メドゥーサ, Medūsa) is Shinji's servant, first seen scouting around Shirō's school. Her true identity is Medusa, the gorgon-witch of legend remembered as one of its infamous monsters. Rider is silent, sultry, and vigilant, never hesitating to shield her Master from harm. She employs covert battle tactics and takes full advantage of her surroundings. With Shinji incapable of lending Mana to her, she is forced to seek alternative means to augment her abilities, such as putting magical seals all over Fuyuki High School that, when activated, drain the life out of any living creature within. It is one of her Noble Phantasms, Blood Fort Andromeda: Outer-Sealing Blood Temple (他者封印・鮮血神殿(ブラッドフォート・アンドロメダ), Buraddofōdo Andoromeda). Her weapon of choice is a pair of long iron nails fastened to opposite ends of a single chain, which she effectively thrusts from distances. Her primary offensive Noble Phantasm is Bellerophon: Bridle of Chivalry (騎兵の手綱(ベルレフォーン), Berurefōn), invoked while riding upon the winged horse Pegasus and is summoned when she stabs her neck. It drives the Pegasus into a killing fury, turning the Pegasus' charge into a wave of energy capable of causing mass destruction. She wears a blindfold, actually, another Noble Phantasm, Breaker Gorgon: Self-Sealing Dark Temple (自己封印・暗黒神殿(ブレーカー・ゴルゴーン), Burēkā Gorugōn), which seals away her powerful Mystic Eyes, Cybele (キュベレイ, Kyuberei), the Mystic Eyes of Petrification (石化の魔眼, Sekika no Magan) that are capable of paralyzing any weaker being who looks at her, instantly turning others into stone. However, in Fate/hollow ataraxia and the True End of Heaven's Feel, she is seen wearing glasses that supplant her blindfold as a seal for her eyes.
Rider is the initial antagonist alongside Shinji and is ultimately defeated by Saber. In the manga adaptation of Fate/Stay night, Rider survives to save her master. In the Unlimited Blade Works route, Rider's role is much briefer as she only engages Shirō once before Caster's master later kills her.
In Heaven's Feel, Sakura, the heroine of the route, is revealed to be the true Master of Rider, thus making Rider the servant protagonist of Heaven's Feel. Rider seeks to protect Sakura despite her murderous deeds due to sharing a kinship with her. After Shirō breaks his alliance with Rin to protect Sakura, Rider effectively replaces his lost Servant Saber as the guardian of the Emiya household. In the endgame, Shirō and Rider defeat Saber Alter and allow Shirō to save Sakura. Rider then carries an unconscious Sakura and a gravely-injured Rin to safety while Shirō ensures the Holy Grail's destruction. While her ultimate fate in the Normal End is not known, the True End depicts Rider surviving the war and remaining in the world without the Grail due to Sakura's massive mana-stores, living peacefully with Shirō and Sakura. Rider is also revealed to have latent feelings for Shirō due to him being the first male to treat her with kindness.
Illyasviel von Einzbern (イリヤスフィール・フォン・アインツベルン, Iriyasufīru fon Aintsuberun)
Voiced by: Mai Kadowaki (Japanese); Stephanie Sheh (English)
A young Teutonic aristocrat who travels to Japan to participate in the Fifth Holy Grail War as the Master of Berserker. She lives in a castle on the outskirts of Fuyuki City, accompanied only by her Servant and her two maids Leysritt and Sella. In the prequel, Fate/Zero, it is established that Illya is the daughter of Kiritsugu Emiya and Irisviel von Einzbern. Illya was then raised to believe her father abandoned her, not knowing that he actually wanted to save her from the Grail's fate. Illya's desire to learn more about the person Kiritsugu raised in his final years instead of her prompts Illya to observe Shirō in some cases or try to take him like possession in others. However, she starts warming up after getting to know him when he treats her kindly despite her prior attempts to kill him. She is a homunculus like her mother, created to serve as the vessel of the Holy Grail. When wearing the Dress of Heaven and empowered by the deaths of at least six Servants, she is capable of performing a limited version of the Third Magic, Heaven's Feel (天の杯(ヘブンズフィール), Hebunzu Fīru), one of the Five types of True Magic (魔法, Mahō) which can accomplish impossibilities beyond modern science or sorcery. In the Fate route, she serves as the antagonist for the second part of the arc with her servant Berserker as she takes Shirō hostage, torn between wanting to take revenge on him in place of Kiritsugu for her years alone or trying to convince him into being a willing possession of hers to care for. Working together, Saber and Shirō managed to defeat Berserker. When Shirō takes her in after this, she is finally convinced that his concern for her is genuine, and she lives peacefully with Shirō after her Servant is defeated. However, none of them know that Illya will soon die, her homunculus' nature having been designed to survive only up to one year after the Fifth Holy Grail War's conclusion. In the Unlimited Blade Works route, she is a minor antagonist; she anticipates meeting with Rin and Shirō as they seek an alliance against Caster when the Servant captures Saber. Still, Illya's own desire to toy with them and stall their approach for her amusement backfires as it leaves her with only Berserker to defend her when Gilgamesh comes after her. After a brutal battle in which Gilgamesh defeats her servant, Illya ultimately dies weeping over the dying body of Berserker. Illya has a greatly expanded role in the Heaven's Feel, and she takes a much more active sisterly role for Shirō early on, helping him through the war and being saved from the Shadow twice over by Shirō. She eventually sacrifices herself to save Shirō and close the Great Holy Grail in the True End.
Gilgamesh (ギルガメッシュ, Girugamesshu)
Voiced by: Tomokazu Seki (Japanese); Grant George (Fate/Stay Night, UBW film), David Vincent (Zero, UBW TV, Heaven's Feel film series) (English)
Gilgamesh is an Archer Class Heroic Spirit who calls himself the King of Heroes, having a severe and sadistic God complex while treating all others as "mongrels" that are not worthy of laying eyes on him. He initially disliked Saber for being a king like himself, but developed an overt but unrequited lust for her from his desire to shatter her resolve. Gilgamesh was previously in the service of Tokiomi Tōsaka before arranging his death by his partner Kirei Kotomine. In the aftermath of the Fuyuki fire, Gilgamesh is bestowed with a physical body by Angra Mainyu and spends the next ten years hiding and feeding off the energy of half-dead orphans before resurfacing during the Fifth Holy Grail War.
Gilgamesh is unique in that he possesses a very large number of Noble Phantasms, but only three are unique to him: the first is Gate of Babylon: King's Treasure (王の財宝(ゲート・オブ・バビロン), Gēto Obu Babiron), a key-shaped sword that opens a portal to a mystical vault containing the Noble Phantasms, the second is Enkidu: Chains of Heaven (天の鎖エルキドゥ, Ten no Kusari Erukidu), a set of nigh-unbreakable binding chains that strengthen and tighten the more divine heritage their target has, and the last is Ea: Sword of Rupture (乖離剣・エア, Kairi Ken Ea), a gold-lined sword with a cylindrical drill-like black blade consisting of three rotating cylinders that can generate an attack known as Enuma Elish: The Star of Creation that Split Heaven and Earth (天地乖離す開闢の星(エヌマエリシュ), Enuma Erishu) that splits the fabric of space and time, capable of overwhelming even Saber's Excalibur with ease. He easily defeats Caster when he makes himself known to Shirō Emiya and the others in the Fate route of the visual novel.
Gilgamesh serves as a primary antagonist in the first two routes while playing only a minor role in the third. In Fate, Saber killed him at the grounds of the Ryūdō Temple in a fierce battle. In Unlimited Blade Works, he plans to create a second Uruk using Angra Mainyu to purge most of the world's human population. His arrogance leads him to be defeated by Shirō, after which he is dragged into the dying Holy Grail just as Shirō is about to deal a fatal blow. Archer then kills him as he attempts to use Shirō to pull himself out of the Holy Grail, falling back into it and being dissolved. In Heaven's Feel, Sakura defeated and consumes Gilgamesh after a brief fight.
Waver Velvet (ウェイバー・ベルベット, Weibā Berubetto) / Lord El-Melloi II (ロード・エルメロイII世, Rōdo Erumeroi Nisei)

Voiced by: Daisuke Namikawa (Japanese); Lucien Dodge (English)
The Master of Rider and future Lord El-Melloi II, Waver steals his teacher's artifact early on and uses it to summon Iskandar during the Fourth Holy Grail War to force the Magus Association to recognize his genius. Despite his difficulties with Rider's overbearing nature, Waver and his Servant form a strong relationship. Though lacking in practical experience in the field of fighting in a war, Waver survives the Holy Grail War with little detriment to himself and develops a greater sense of perspective of the world, though he now harbors some bitterness towards Japan.
Upon returning, he later becomes a professor and the Dean of Norwich, the Modern Magecraft Theory Department of the Clock Tower, having preceded Kayneth as his successor to the El-Melloi class and bearing the title of Lord El-Melloi II. Though Waver does not appear in Fate and any of its three routes, he makes an appearance in the epilogue of Ufotable's anime adaptation of Unlimited Blade Works as he walks down the hallway of the Clock Tower and meets Shirou. Waver asks Shirou for his reasons to study magecraft at the Clock Tower. Shirou replies that he wants to become a hero of justice. While Waver accepts that while his dream might be foolish, he thinks it might be too big for the Clock Tower to contain.
Waver would later be the protagonist of his spin-off series The Case Files of Lord El-Melloi II and its sequel The Adventures of Lord El-Melloi II and would later make appearances in Fate/Apocrypha, Fate/strange fake and Fate/kaleid liner Prisma Illya as a supporting character. In Fate/Grand Order, Waver appears as the Pseudo Servant under the name of Zhuge Liang (諸葛孔明, Shokatsu Kōmei), also known as Zhuge Kongming. Despite possessing Waver as his vessel, Kongming still bears the Lord El-Melloi II title presumably due to the mixture of Waver's personality and soul.
Caren Ortensia (カレン・オルテンシア, Karen Orutenshia)
Voiced by Ami Koshimizu (Fate/tiger colosseum, the All Around Type-Moon Drama CD, Carnival Phantasm, Fate/kaleid liner Prisma Illya (anime) and Fate/hollow ataraxia (PSVita))
A new and central character to the story, Caren is a member of the Church and works as a priestess. She is kind and forgiving to the point that she believes her only purpose in life is to help others, even if she is hurt in the process. She never blames the person who has hurt her and blames the act on demons who caused the person to commit the sin. Whenever she is at fault, she apologizes to God rather than the person. Despite her kindness, she has a love for teasing and exploiting others' emotional vulnerability. Upon discovery of an individual's weak spot, she enjoys bringing it out to light in front of all to witness. While this antagonizes many characters and causes much outrage and humiliation, she herself remains calm. Also, in spite of being a priestess, she has deliberately chosen to wear a revealing costume with no skirt to both increase her mobility and to seduce men.
As a member of the Church, Caren assists in exorcisms. Her body itself possesses an unusual property: if there is a person nearby who has been possessed by a demon, she will experience the same pain as the possessed person. As a result, exorcists employ her to act as a radar of sorts to find demons. This ability is most evident whenever she comes in proximity to the Servant Avenger as her body sprouts grotesque spikes. As a result of this power, she is always covered in bandages. She also experiences physical pain whenever people in proximity do evil things. In battle, she uses a red cloth of Magdala, which has the power to forcefully bind men. However, while the man is bound, no harmful physical attacks can be made against him or Magdala will be rendered useless. She is actually the daughter of Kirei Kotomine and hates him for abandoning her. In the epilogue, she has some interest in Shirou due to her close interactions with Avenger in the time loop, even painting him with oil to resemble the latter. She also wields control over Lancer, much to Bazett's dismay, as compensation for having saved Bazett, and refuses to return the Command Seals to Bazett unless she can have Bazett's current artificial hand, which the both of them have come to see as a sentimental reminder of Avenger.
Avenger (アヴェンジャー, Avenger)
Voiced by (Takuma Terashima in Fate/tiger colosseum, Fate/hollow ataraxia (PSVita), and Fate/Grand Order)
The 8th Servant, who was summoned in the 3rd war in lieu of a Berserker and another of the main protagonists. Avenger was originally a normal boy in the ancient middle east who, in a cruel twist of fate, was labeled as Angra Mainyu via a random lottery and was tortured until he died of old age so that he, as the embodiment of evil itself, could allow the other villagers to live free of sin and as a result became the first "Anti-Hero" to enter the Throne of Heroes, as well as becoming the model from which all martyrs within the Throne of Heroes stem from. He was later summoned as Avenger in the Third Grail War by the Einzbern in an attempt to cheat, but was the first to die (as he is not the actual Angra Mainyu, who had long since left for the Other Side of the World) and corrupted the Grail, as the belief of others had made him into All The World's Evils even though the Grail recognized him as a human with a wish it needed to fulfill (his own rebirth as Angra Mainyu), his presence within the Grail is what allows for the summoning of some of history and mythology's greatest villains and monsters as "heroes". He was released when Emiya Shirou and Saber utterly annihilated the Grail at the end of the Fifth Grail War and came across a dying Bazett and responded to her wish to live, by creating the time loop inside of Bazett's mind and created replicas of characters this dream world, but as he did not personally experience the Fifth Grail War, he instead recreated it using the Fifth's replica participants and with the Third Grail War's development as the base. He then took part in the loop using Emiya Shirou's body as a shell, allowing him to experience the peaceful daily life that Shirou experiences. He wields a pair of misshapen and brittle daggers in combat and his Noble Phantasm is "Verg Avesta" which reflects the pain caused by an opponent's attack back at them. He eventually decides to end the loop after realizing all the trouble he has caused and, with help from his new friends and allies, fights off the pieces of him that protect the Grail and ends the loop for good, but not before using the hidden crack that was opened in space-time of reality in real world made by Rin's copy of the Jeweled Sword of Zelretch by transfer and stabilize the timeline he helped create in the mind of Bazett, thus reviving the participants who died in the real Fifth Holy Grail War more than half a year ago (Masters and Servants, except Kotomine Kirei) and transferring the memories that Avenger did when he acted as Shirou for the true Shirou, so he can live and act on them (except the parts concerning Avenger and his remains as Shades so to hide his existence from Shirou) and so Shirou, Caren, and Bazett can live out whatever life they had made in this new timeline.

== Supporting characters ==
=== Participants of the Fifth Holy Grail War ===
==== Masters ====
Shinji Matou (間桐 慎二, Matō Shinji)
Voiced by: Hiroshi Kamiya (Japanese); Doug Erholtz (Fate/Stay Night, UBW film), Kyle McCarley (UBW TV, Heaven's Feel film) (English)
Sakura's older brother and a long-time friend of Shirou, until Shirou discovered Shinji abusing Sakura, at which point Shirou beat Shinji within an inch of his life. Shinji is very popular as vice-captain of the archery dojo despite being chauvinistic and a narcissist. Like Rin Tohsaka, he is of a distinguished lineage of Japanese sorcerers (though his family is originally from Russia), though the Matou blood has thinned and no longer produces heirs naturally capable of sorcery. Shinji feels uncomfortable with his sister's daily visits to Shirou's home. He has an open crush on Rin, but she does not return his feelings.
He participates in the Fifth Holy Grail War as a Master, with Rider as his Servant, although he does not have Mage abilities. He is beaten and humiliated by Shirou, who almost crushes Shinji's throat for using the school as a power source. He has a Command Seal created by his younger sister, who is Rider's true Master. In the Fate route, after Rider loses to Saber, his book burns up; he flees but is killed by Berserker. In the Unlimited Blade Works route, he is implanted with the heart of Illya, the seed of the Holy Grail by Gilgamesh, but is later rescued by Rin Tohsaka and ultimately survives. In the Heaven's Feel route, he is ousted as a false Master as Rider returns to her true Master, Sakura. It is revealed that he had been raping Sakura for many years. He threatens to expose this to Shirō and in a fit of fright, Sakura murders Shinji.
Sōichirō Kuzuki (葛木 宗一郎, Kuzuki Sōichirō)
Voiced by: Kazuhiro Nakata (Fate/Stay Night, UBW film), Masaki Terasoma (UBW TV, Heaven's Feel film) (Japanese); Patrick Seitz (Fate/Stay Night, UBW film), Lex Lang (UBW TV, Heaven's Feel film) (English)
Kuzuki is an instructor in Rin's class. Kuzuki is well respected among staff and students. He is a highly trained assassin who has no qualms about letting his servant Caster, whom he loves, do whatever she wants, even if the actions are considered evil. He has been staying at Issei Ryoudou's place for three years and is regarded by Issei as a brother. In the anime and the "Unlimited Blade Works" route of the visual novel, he has Caster enhance the power of his fists. In the Unlimited Blade Works route, in which he is revealed as Caster's Master, whom she made a contract with after killing her original Master (known in the anime as Atram Galiast). After his Servant is killed by Archer's hail of swords, he is defeated in melee by Archer. In the Heaven's Feel route, Kuzuki is never seen but is described as having been killed by unknown means during the Shadow's attack on the temple, with Saber and Shirō arriving soon after to find Caster standing over his dead body in shock. Caster is shown as having gone mad with grief over his death and denoting that she might as well have killed him with her own hands if this outcome was the result of him being her Master, ultimately being killed by Saber in the ensuing fight. The Fate anime adaptation depicts him dying at Gilgamesh's hands.
Zōken Matō (間桐 臓硯, Matō Zōken)
Voiced by: Masane Tsukayama (Japanese); Michael Donovan (English)
Zōken is a powerful, ancient magus and the patriarch of the Matō family, his methods of training being sadistic in nature. Originally from Russia, he is one of the three Magi that set up the Holy Grail System and Command Seals while prolonging his life using parasitic Crest Worms. Having amassed an enormous wealth of knowledge and experience, Zōken conceals his true nature by masquerading as a relative of his descendants by having Shinji and Sakura refer to him as their grandfather. During the events of Fate/Zero, after Kariya turned his back on their family, with Byakuya and Shinji, Zōken adopted Sakura to reinvigorate his bloodline and exploits Kariya's reaction to this to have him represent their family in the Fourth Holy Grail War with expectation of his failure. Serving as the main antagonist of the Heaven's Feel route, Zōken initially controlled Dark Sakura before she obliterated his body, reducing him to a single worm. After seeing Illya in her Dress of Heaven and remembering why he fought to survive for so long, he stops clinging to life and is able to die in peace.

==== Servants ====
Lancer (ランサー, Ransā) – Cú Chulainn (クー・フーリン, Kū Fūrin)
Voiced by: Nobutoshi Canna (Japanese); Tony Oliver (English)
The first hostile Servant to appear in the Fifth Holy Grail War. His true identity is Cú Chulainn, the "child of light" from Ireland and one of its most famed heroes. He has a playful attitude and takes a carefree approach to life but quickly works himself into a frenzy during a heated battle. His Noble Phantasm is Gáe Bolg: Spear of Impaling Barbed Death (刺し穿つ死棘の槍(ゲイ・ボルク), Gei Boruku). When activated, it reverses the laws of cause and effect, meaning that the fact that the next strike will hit the opponent's heart becomes a foregone conclusion, even before the spear is thrust. This causes its next strike to become completely unavoidable and fatal, ignoring all magical and physical protection, bending at impossible angles and around obstacles. The only way to survive this technique is to be blessed with a large degree of luck to have the spear strike a region other than the heart, as avoiding the blow is impossible. In the Unlimited Blade Works route, he also uses Gáe Bolg: Spear of Striking Death Flight (突き穿つ死翔の槍(ゲイ・ボルク), Gei Boruku), which maximizes Gáe Bolg's true capabilities as a thrown weapon.
In the Fate route, his death is not seen. His death is portrayed in Studio Deen's anime adaptation of the Fate route as being the result of Gilgamesh. In the Unlimited Blade Works route, he offers to temporarily become allies with Shirō and Rin after Caster steals Saber and Archer betrays Rin to join her, becoming the pair's subsidiary Servant. Lancer discovers Kirei's hand in the mess when the Priest explains he'd manipulated the events to his advantage, intending to use Rin as the vessel for the Holy Grail. He then collapses from a fatal wound after being ordered to commit suicide via Command Spell, but not before killing Kirei and stabbing Shinji Matō. He then sets fire to the Einzbern castle with magic before fading away. In the Heaven's Feel route, Lancer dies early on, being killed by True Assassin.
Berserker (バーサーカー, Bāsākā) – Heracles (ヘラクレス, Herakuresu)
Voiced by: Tadahisa Saizen (Japanese); Michael McConnohie (English)
The Servant of Illya, who appears as a giant with adamantine skin and gross brawn. His true identity is Heracles, a legendary hero and demigod of Greece and the son of the Ruler of the Gods, Zeus. He wields a colossal axe-sword, and is capable of causing massive destruction with the mere backlash of his swings. Berserkers are praised as members of the "Strongest" class, though they are difficult to control and can turn on their Masters. Berserker's main Noble Phantasm is God Hand: Twelve Labours (十二の試練(ゴッド・ハンド), Goddo Hando), which grants automatic resurrection, up to 11 resurrections – meaning Berserker needs to be killed 12 times to be put down permanently, one for each of Heracles's twelve labors. Berserker also possess a Noble Phantasm called Nine Lives: The Shooting Hundred Heads (射殺す百頭(ナインライブス), Nain Raibuzu), which is the legendary bow and arrow set used by Heracles to slay the nine-headed Hydra. Shirō uses it in the Heaven's Feel route, projecting Berserker's axe-sword against a corrupted Berserker to remove all his remaining lives in one go in a modified technique known as Nine Lives Blade Works: The Shooting Hundred Heads (是・射殺す百頭(ナインライブズ・ブレイドワークス), Nain Raibuzu Bureido Wākusu). In the anime and the "Fate" route of the visual novel, Shirō and Saber perform a joint special attack with a traced Caliburn, Saber's lost Noble Phantasm, and kill him. In the Unlimited Blade Works route, Gilgamesh binds the Servant down with his divine chains and pelts him with weapons, removing all his lives and killing him. In the "Heaven's Feel" route, Berserker is defeated by Saber Alter – the corrupted form of Saber – and is then consumed by Angra Mainyu and reborn as the decrepit Dark Berserker. He is later killed by Shirō Emiya.
Assassin (アサシン, Asashin)
Voiced by: Shin-ichiro Miki (Japanese), David Vincent (Fate/stay night, UBW film), Todd Haberkorn (UBW TV) (English)
A solitary Servant, clothed in a traditional Japanese hakama and kimono with an indigo haori. He carries an odachi as his main weapon. He initially claims to be Sasaki Kojirō (佐々木小次郎), but in reality he is a nameless samurai "who forged his past and is a master swordsman only in people's memories". He was summoned by Caster as a guardian and watchman for the front gate of the Ryūdō Temple. As an improper servant, Assassin is entirely dependent on Caster for mana and cannot move freely beyond the grounds of Ryūdō Temple. Because of his limited status, Assassin only seeks to enjoy a decent sword fight. His special move is the Turning Swallow Strike (秘剣・燕返し, Tsubame Gaeshi), an unblockable attack that hits from three directions simultaneously, reaching into parallel dimensions. It is a sword skill of the highest degree that requires no mana other than that needed for Assassin to move, and as such is incredibly efficient. It is a sure-kill move, although in a different sense from Gáe Bolg. In Fate/Hollow ataraxia, he is described as having been killed by Gilgamesh. In the Unlimited Blade Works route, he faces Saber once after letting Shirō and Archer pass to let them cause inconvenience for Caster, later letting Saber leave with her Master after Archer wounds Shirō as a sign of respect for her abilities and desire to defend her comrade. Saber defeats him on the last night of the Holy Grail War. In Heaven's Feel route, Assassin's flesh serves as Zōken Matō's catalyst for summoning True Assassin, with the latter bursting out from within his flesh.
Caster (キャスター, Kyasutā) – Medea (メディア, Media)
Voiced by: Atsuko Tanaka (Japanese); Tara Platt (Fate/Stay Night, UBW film), Megan Hollingshead (UBW TV) (English)
She is an honored guest of the Ryūdō family, permitted to live at their temple until the preparations for her marriage have been finalized. Her true identity is Medea, the disgraced princess of Colchis who was branded a witch due to actions outside her control. Unlike other Servants, she does not wield a weapon for physical combat, but her rank allows her to manipulate Mana and perform magic like a wizard, which other Servants cannot do. Her magical ability far surpasses modern Magi, due to her technique, High-Speed Divine Words (高速神言). This allows her to cast spells that would normally take minutes to cast by uttering a single word. Because of her Magus ability, she has a dual role as a Servant to Kuzuki and a Master of Assassin. Her Noble Phantasm is Rule Breaker: Destroyer of all Talismans (破戒すべき全ての符(ルールブレイカー), Rūru Bureikā), an otherwise weak dagger which dispels all forms of magic that it comes in contact with. Its greatest use is in severing the bond between Master and Servant. She also possesses a Noble Phantasm called Argon Coin: The Golden Fleece (金羊の皮(アルゴンコイン), Arugon Koin), a coat of golden fleece which is capable of summoning the original Colchis dragon that guarded it after it is thrown upon the ground. However, she is not capable of using it in the Fifth Holy Grail War.
In the Fifth Holy Grail War, shortly after her summoning, she kills her original Master Atram Galiast within a few days, and is later taken in by her current Master Sōichirō Kuzuki at the Ryūdō Temple. Caster quickly fell in love with Sōichirō, for he was the first man to show her genuine kindness, dedication, and loyalty. Her primary objective shifted from obtaining the Holy Grail for herself to simply preserving their short time together. To that end, she takes the souls of other beings to sustain herself and strengthen her defensive power, as Kuzuki is incapable of providing her with Mana. In the anime-original storyline, she kidnaps Sakura by possessing her body and stabbing Saber with Rule Breaker, but, because of Saber's A-ranked magic resistance, she was only able to take away Saber's ability to use her Noble Phantasm. She then tries to sacrifice Sakura, who has latent Magus abilities, to summon the Holy Grail directly. She is then defeated by Gilgamesh's Gate of Babylon in her underground city. In the Fate route, she is defeated by Gilgamesh's Gate of Babylon while attempting to attack the Emiya household. In the Unlimited Blade Works route, she is the primary antagonist of the first third of the path. She personally stabs Saber with Rule Breaker, turning her into her Servant for a short time, but is later betrayed and defeated by Archer. In the Heaven's Feel route, she is killed by Saber early on after losing Assassin and Kuzuki in an attack by the Shadow. Still, Zōken Matō uses one of his worm familiars to maintain her body as a puppet for a brief period before Saber slays it. Her Rule Breaker would play a critical role later, being projected by Shirou to sever Sakura's connection to The Shadow.
True Assassin (真アサシン, Shin Asashin) - Hassan of the Cursed Arm (ハサン・サッバーハ, Hasan Sabbāha)
Voiced by: Tetsu Inada(True Assassin), Sachie Abe (Assassin), Takuo Kawamura (Assassin), Eiichiro Tokumoto (Assassin) (Japanese); Patrick Seitz, Karen Strassman (Assassin), Vic Mignogna (Assassin) (English)
The Hassan-i Sabbāh that appears in the Heaven's Feel route of the Fifth War is a servant that Zōken Matō summoned by sacrificing Kojirō. Known as True Assassin, he possesses a unique ability to conceal his presence outside of battle. His Noble Phantasm is Zabaniya: Delusional Heartbeat (妄想心音(ザバーニーヤ), Zabānīya), a long, satanic, three-metre long right arm which replaces the heart of whoever it touches with a fake substitute, which can be crushed to destroy the real heart. True Assassin battles Saber and traps her between his Noble Phantasm and The Shadow, resulting in her being devoured by the latter and her subsequent corruption into Saber Alter. He attempts to kill Shirō immediately after but is defeated by Rider, who comes to Shirō's defense at the behest of her true master – revealed later to be Sakura Matō. He is later slain by Sakura's Shadow when Sakura turns on Zōken as revenge for his years of tormenting her.

=== Participants of the Fourth Holy Grail War ===
==== Masters ====
Tokiomi Tohsaka (遠坂 時臣, Tōsaka Tokiomi)
Voiced by: Show Hayami (Japanese); Marc Diraison (English)
Tokiomi is the father of Rin and Sakura, an arrogant and manipulative mage who was Gilgamesh's master during the Fourth Holy Grail War. He arranges for Kirei Kotomine to be his understudy in magic and his support in the Holy Grail War. He thinks highly of Kotomine and has him serve in all manners of affairs, appointing him as Rin's guardian should trouble befall him. He is skilled in fire manipulation, and employs a large ruby set in the end of a staff as his Mystic Code to help him shape and control flame. While a skilled mage and confident in his abilities, he is actually one of the weakest Tohsaka in history and considers himself as inferior in potential to Rin and Sakura, who were both recognized by Tokiomi as possessing extraordinary abilities from birth. Though he and Kiritsugu never have any actual one-on-one engagements, the two are perfect foils for one another, as Kiritsugu is a tech-savvy spellcaster who puts his job as a father ahead of his job as a mage, while Tokiomi is a traditional mage who puts his identity as a mage before all else. He eventually meets his end when Kirei, who had been corrupted by Gilgamesh, stabs him in the back with an ornamental dagger Tokiomi had gifted Kirei with moments earlier. Kirei lies to Rin that her father was murdered by Kariya, giving her the dagger as a present, which ironically was later used to defeat Kirei in the Fate route.
Kariya Matou (間桐 雁夜, Matō Kariya)
Voiced by: Tarusuke Shingaki (Japanese); Liam O'Brien (English)
Kariya is the uncle of Shinji Matō and Lancelot's master during the Fourth Holy Grail War. He is the only member of the Matō family who truly loves Sakura Matō like a daughter, and harbors a very strong grudge against Tokiomi, who allowed his younger child to be adopted by Zōken. Kariya had previously left the Matō family ten years prior to the 4th Holy Grail War out of disgust for his own family, but returns and makes a deal with Zōken Matō that he will win the Grail War in exchange for Sakura's freedom. He is in love with Aoi (his childhood friend), although he stepped down after she chose to marry Tokiomi instead. Due to his lack of formal training, Kariya was implanted with the same magical worms as Sakura. This caused a number of side effects as the worms would literally eat away at their host, causing Kariya's health to progressively fail in return for significantly expanding his magic circuits and magical potential. By the time of his summoning of a Servant, Kariya's hair had turned white and the nerves on the left side of his face were dead. In addition, his natural lifespan had been shortened to such an extent that Zōken estimated he would only live on for one additional year. However, despite the Crest Worms and his own accelerated training, Kariya remained severely lacking as a Magus. At Zōken's behest, he compensated for this by summoning the most powerful of the seven Servant classes, the Servant of Mad Enhancement, Berserker. However, the high volume of magical energy required to maintain Berserker causes him frequent, severe pain. He dies after exhausting his energy and passes away while dreaming of Aoi, Rin, Sakura, and the life he wished he could have had with them.
Ryūnosuke Uryū (雨生 龍之介, Uryū Ryūnosuke)
Voiced by: Akira Ishida (Japanese); Johnny Yong Bosch (English)
Ryūnosuke is Bluebeard's master, a highly deranged serial killer who summons the Caster class servant after murdering a family and using their blood as a component in the summoning ritual. He does not seek the Holy Grail, but follows Bluebeard in order to find macabre ways to kill people and relieve his boredom, using a hypnotic charm to lure children to their deaths. But Ryūnosuke does admit that he does in fact feel that there is something missing from his life and that, on some level, he desires to find it through his atrocities. He eventually becomes the primary antagonist of the first season, as the entire war is put on hold so as to stop his and Bluebeard's rampage. He is killed by Kiritsugu with shot to the stomach and then the head, having a realization the interval between the bullets that the "thing" he had been searching for his whole life was his own death.
Kayneth El-Melloi Archibald (ケイネス・エルメロイ・アーチボルト, Keinesu Erumeroi Āchiboruto)
Voiced by: Takumi Yamazaki (Japanese); Doug Erholtz (English)
The Master of Diarmuid Ua Duibhne, Kayneth is a nobleman from the Magus Association, Lord of the House of El-Melloi and a prodigy at magecraft, said to be the most talented participant in the Holy Grail War. His artifact is stolen by his pupil, Waver Velvet, but he manages to obtain another artifact and summon Diarmuid instead. While he holds the command spells for his Lancer, the energy to materialize the Servant is maintained by Sola-Ui. Despite his skill, Kayneth's overly-traditional approach to combat causes him to underestimate his opponents' capacity for violence, as he believes that the Holy Grail War will be fought with honorable duels and tests of skill rather than quick blitzkriegs like those perpetrated by Kiritsugu and Kotomine. He is confident in his abilities and takes pride in his heritage, but finds the extent of Kiritsugu's untraditional and underhanded tactics both offensive and unexpectedly challenging to overcome. He loses his ability to use magecraft after being shot by Kiritsugu's Origin Bullet and is left half-blind and crippled. Sola-Ui then steals his Command Seals to make Lancer hers. After being forced to make Diarmuid commit suicide, he and Sola-Ui are sniped by Maiya so as to tie up any loose ends and avoid future retribution from the Archibald family. Kayneth is then killed by Saber as an act of mercy.

==== Servants ====
Lancer (ランサー, Ransā) – Diarmuid Ua Duibhne (ディルムッド・オディナ, Dirumuddo Odina)
Voiced by: Hikaru Midorikawa (Japanese); Grant George (English)
The First of the Knights of Fianna, Lancer possesses a love spot on his face, which causes females with insufficient magic resistance to fall in love with him should they gaze upon it. As a knight, he adheres to a code of honour in battle and a sense of loyalty to his master, being summoned to fight in the Fourth Holy Grail War because he wants to display the loyalty to his lord that he was not able to show when he was alive. Despite being enemies, he and Saber share mutual respect for each other, and he considers it his duty to take her head, protecting her and aiding her on multiple occasions, in an attempt to ensure that he will be the one to kill her. Lancer fights at Mion river with the other heroic spirits, where he is forced to break one of his spears, Gae Buidhe, in order to allow the wound he inflicted upon Saber to heal so that she can use her noble phantasm, Excalibur, to destroy Caster. Later that day, during a one-on-one duel with Saber, Lancer is forced to commit suicide by Kayneth, and dies cursing his master, Sola-Ui, Kiritsugu, Saber, and the Grail for destroying his pride and last remaining wish.
Lancer possesses two Noble Phantasms: Gae Buidhe: The Golden Rose of Mortality (必滅の黄薔薇(ゲイ・ボウ), Gei Bō), a short yellow spear which inflicts wounds that do not heal as long as the spear exists in the world, and Gae Dearg: The Crimson Rose of Exorcism (破魔の紅薔薇(ゲイ・ジャルグ), Gei Jarugu), a long red spear which cancels mana upon contact, ignoring all magical defences and temporarily dispelling all magical attributes of the target struck.
Rider (ライダー, Raidā) – Iskandar (イスカンダル, Isukandaru)
Voiced by: Akio Ōtsuka (adult), Maaya Sakamoto (young, Fate/Grand Order) (Japanese); Jamieson Price (English)
Iskandar, the King of Conquerors, famous in history as Alexander the Great, appears during the Fourth Holy Grail War to seek reincarnation and resume his conquest of the world. He derives his status as Rider from a set of divine bulls and chariot purportedly a gift from Zeus, known as Gordius Wheel: Wheel of Heaven's Authority (神威の車輪(ゴルディアス・ホイール), Gorudiasu Hoīru), summoned when Iskandar slices the air with his Sword of the Kupriotes (キュプリオトの剣, Kyupurioto no Ken). His eccentric and overbearing personality along with his incredible abilities creates difficulties for his Master and their opponents. He is also the only Servant that Gilgamesh truly respects as an equal, the latter inviting him to challenge him in combat as many times as he wished. He is killed by Gilgamesh in single combat and, in his dying moments, finally finds Oceanus, the place he had searched for all his life.
His first Noble Phantasm is Via Expugnatio: Distant Trampling Domination (遙かなる蹂躙制覇(ヴィア・エクスプグナティオ), Via Ekusupugunatio), the trampling attack used by the Gordius Wheel, which causes lightning strikes upon movement, inflicting massive damage to whatever is in its path. His second and most powerful Noble Phantasm is Ionioi Hetairoi: Army of the King (王の軍勢(アイオニオン・ヘタイロイ), Aionion Hetairoi), which is a Reality Marble, a self-contained miniature world that contains thousands of the most trusted of his soldiers who fought alongside him in life resurrected as temporary Servants, marching upon an endless plain of sand.
Caster (キャスター, Kyasutā) – Gilles de Rais (ジル・ド・レェ, Jiru Do Rē),
Voiced by: Satoshi Tsuruoka (Japanese); Dan Woren (English)
Commonly known as Bluebeard, his real name is Gilles de Rais – a comrade of Jeanne d'Arc whose death drove him insane as he spent his final years dabbling in the occult becoming a serial killer of children. Deriving pleasure from giving his victims a false sense of hope before killing them, Rais entered the Fourth Holy Grail War to revive Jeanne. But he mistook Saber for an amnesiac Jeanne and assumed he already won the war, proceeding to go on a killing spree with Ryūnosuke that forces the war to be placed on hold until they are eliminated. Following Ryūnosuke restoring the Caster's faith in God with his twisted perception of humanity's relation to the divine as entertainment, Rais decides to give God a show with his Noble Phantasm. Following Ryūnosuke's death, Rais is obliterated by Saber's Excalibur.
His sole Noble Phantasm is Prelati's Spellbook: Text of the Sunken Spiraled City (螺湮城教本(プレラーティーズ・スペルブック), Purerātīzu Superubukku), a magical tome made from human skin which acts as a massive mana source and a guidebook for various spells of varying power. Among its spells include summoning otherworldly monsters known as Horrors. The strength of his Noble Phantasm helps make up for his otherwise average ability in magecraft. A Saber variant of Rais appears in Fate/Apocrypha.
Berserker (バーサーカー, Bāsākā) – Lancelot of the Lake (サー・ランスロット, Sā Ransurotto)
Voiced by: Ryōtarō Okiayu (Japanese); Kyle Hebert (English)
Previously known as the Black Knight, Berserker is a Servant during the Fourth Holy Grail War who possesses the ability to use practically any object as a Noble Phantasm, allowing him to match Gilgamesh in combat. His madness has reduced him to a mindless, though dangerously skilled, fighter. Despite his insanity, he is still able to instinctively recognize Saber. When Saber finally learns Berserker's true identity, she is devastated that her decisions in life and her adherence to chivalry had caused her friend such suffering even after dying. During the battle it is revealed that his insanity stems from his overwhelming desire to be punished for his adultery with Guinevere, his sanity being eaten away as he was forced to watch Saber throw away her humanity for the sake of her people. He is killed by Saber as he is about to deal her a killing blow when his Master runs out of magical energy midway, and regains his sanity in his dying moments. His death almost drives Saber into darkness, as she becomes hellbent on gaining the Grail by any means.
He possesses three Noble Phantasms, the first of which is For Someone's Glory: Not For One's Own Glory (己が栄光の為でなく(フォー・サムワンズ・グロウリー), Fō Samuwanzu Gurōrī), which envelopes him in a black fog that makes his outline blurred and his status unreadable to other Masters. By use of a Command Spell, it is possible to use the fog to allow Berserker to mimic another's appearance, although it is noted that had Lancelot been summoned under a different Class, he would be able to freely disguise at will. Knight of Honor: A Knight Does Not Die with Empty Hands (騎士は徒手にて死せず(ナイト・オブ・オーナー), Naito Obu Ōnā), allows him to turn anything he recognizes as a weapon, into a D-ranked Noble Phantasm. If he grabs hold of others' Noble Phantasms, he claims them temporarily as his own and their original rank is retained, making it the perfect counter to Archer's attacks. His last Noble Phantasm, Arondight: The Unfading Light of the Lake (無毀なる湖光(アロンダイト), Arondaito) is a magical sword which, when drawn, dispels For Someone's Glory and Knight of Honor, boosts all his parameters and grants him additional prowess against beings with a 'dragon' attribute such as Saber.
Assassin (アサシン, Asashin) – Hassan of the Hundred Personas (ハサン・サッバーハ, Hasan Sabbāha)
Voiced by: Sachie Abe, Takuo Kawamura, Eiichiro Tokumoto (Japanese); Karen Strassman, Patrick Seitz, Vic Mignogna (English)
Assassin is actually the reincarnation of the head of the Assassin Order. While every Assassin in every Grail War thus recorded has shared the same name of Hassan-i Sabbāh, they are different persons as all the leaders of the Assassin Order changed their names to Hassan-i Sabbāh upon ascending to the position.
The Hassan-i Sabbāh in the Fourth War became head by intentionally fracturing his psyche during life to confuse opponents, a form of self-inflicted dissociative identity disorder. When summoned as a Servant, this ability manifests itself as the Noble Phantasm Zabaniya: Delusional Illusion (妄想幻像(ザバーニーヤ), Zabānīya), which splits his body into up to eighty different entities, sharing his spiritual potential amongst them. They act as reconnaissance agents for Tokiomi and Kirei after Gilgamesh "kills" one of them. Assassin can only be truly defeated if all of them are killed, which they are after being massacred by Rider's Ionian Hetairoi.

=== Others ===
Taiga Fujimura (藤村 大河, Fujimura Taiga)
Voiced by: Miki Itō, Hisako Kanemoto (teenager) (Japanese); Julie Ann Taylor (English)
She is an English teacher at Shirō's school, homeroom instructor of Shirō's class, and the supervising teacher for the archery dojo. She is widely called "Tiger" (タイガー, Taigā), a nickname she dislikes, but Shirō calls her "Fuji-nee" (older sister Fuji). After Kiritsugu passes away, Taiga becomes Shirō's guardian and has been living with him for several years. Taiga and Shirō are very close, and she regards him as a younger brother. She is also a skilled swordswoman, wielding a shinai known as the Tora-Shinai that was jokingly said to have absorbed so much bloodlust that it has become a high-level cursed object. She has a grandfather named Raiga.
Issei Ryūdō (柳洞 一成, Ryūdō Issei)
Voiced by: Mitsuaki Madono (Japanese); Lex Lang (Fate/Stay Night), Robbie Daymond (UBW TV) (English)
Issei is the Student Body President of Shirō's school, and another close friend of Shirō. Issei often asks Shirō to fix broken equipment for the Student Body to save money on school expenses. Issei and Shirō often have lunch together in the Student Body office where they talk about whatever comes to mind. His father is the head priest of Ryūdō Temple, and his brother was a classmate of Taiga and Neko-san.
Maiya Hisau (久宇 舞弥, Hisau Maiya)
Voiced by: Ayumi Tsunematsu (Japanese); Carrie Keranen (English)
Maiya is an assistant to Kiritsugu Emiya. She is cold and professional, which makes it easier for Kiritsugu to act as he needs to. Maiya was originally a child soldier from a war-torn land who was rescued by Kiritsugu who taught her his way of life. Her real name is unknown; her current name was given to her by Kiritsugu when he first created false identity documents for her. Despite initial discomfort between them, she and Irisviel develop a mutual respect for one another out of their steadfast dedication to protect Kiritsugu. She is fatally wounded by Berserker (disguised as Rider) when she defends Irisviel and dies after she is found by Kiritsugu. It was later revealed that she was raped in the past by an unknown soldier, resulting on her having a son who she never seen when an unknown government took him from her upon birth to be raised a soldier. Her son would later take on the name Sigma, who knew few details about his mother and is one of the protagonists in Fate/strange fake.
Sola-Ui Nuada-Re Sophia-Ri (ソラウ・ヌァザレ・ソフィアリ, Sorau Nuazare Sofiari)
Voiced by: Megumi Toyoguchi (Japanese); Karen Strassman (English)
The daughter of the head of the spiritual evocation division, Sola-Ui is engaged to Kayneth as a result of a strategic marriage arrangement and the decision of her family to entrust their crest to her brother instead. However, she is coldhearted and does not reciprocate Kayneth's love for her; instead, she becomes infatuated with Diarmuid, who in turn does not reciprocate her feelings and regards her only as his Master's wife. After Kayneth loses his magecraft abilities, Sola-Ui eventually steals his Command Seals by breaking his fingers until he gives them to her, only to lose them when Maiya cuts off her arm. She is used by Kiritsugu as a bargaining chip against Kayneth to force Diarmuid to commit suicide, and is then shot dead by Maiya.
Angra Mainyu (アンリマユ, Anrimayu)
A Servant who was formerly a villager from ancient times who was driven mad from being sacrificed to a torturous ritual after being selected as "source of all evil in the world", losing his identity consumed by his growing hatred towards humanity while becoming a Heroic Spirit as his forced sacrifice eased his peoples' state of mind. Angra Mainyu was made a Servant during the Third Holy Grail War by the Einzbern family with the rare class of Avenger yet lacked the fighting strength of the other servants before being defeated and absorbed into the Holy Grail, corrupting it while turned into monstrous being whose existence influenced the following wars in the form of black mud.
During the events of Fate/Zero, invested in Kiritsugu Emiya due to their similar ideas, Angra Mainyu assimilated the form and memories of the deceased Irisviel and speak to Kiritsugu as the Greater Grail materializes. But Kritsugu rejects Angra Mainyu and is cursed while attempting to destroy the Holy Grail, the Avenger reviving Kirei and giving Gilgamesh a physical body while also tormenting Illya and providing Zouken with fragments of the Grail that were placed in Sakura's body.
Angra Mainyu makes his presence known in the end of the three routes through the machinations of Kirei, Gilgamesh, and Zouken.

== Minor characters ==
Aoi Tohsaka (遠坂 葵, Tōsaka Aoi)
Voiced by: Hasumi Ito (Japanese); Michelle Ruff (English)
Aoi is the mother of Rin Tohsaka and Sakura Matou as well as the childhood friend of Kariya Matou. Though she is devastated by Tokiomi's decision to give Sakura away, she quietly accepts the decision due to the fact that she puts her position as the wife of a mage ahead of her position as a mother. She is tricked by Kotomine into believing Kariya had murdered Tokiomi out of jealousy, and declares that Kariya had "never loved anyone in his entire life" after the two get into a heated argument. This causes Kariya to finally snap and give in to his madness-fueled anger and lust. He strangles Aoi into unconsciousness in a fit of rage and gives her severe brain damage, leaving her both crippled and believing that her family is still whole. She dies sometime before the events of the original story.
Risei Kotomine (言峰 璃正, Kotomine Risei)
Voiced by: Masashi Hirose (Japanese); Michael Donovan (English)
Risei is Kirei Kotomine's 80-year-old father, a priest in the Church and the Overseer of the 4th Holy Grail War. He is a friend of Tokiomi Tohsaka and actively supports him in a manner that borderlines on corruption. While he is proud of his son, who has demonstrated himself to be a perfect heir, Risei fails to understand Kirei in any sense. He is killed by Kayneth, but not before he is able to write a message in blood to Kirei about the location of the remaining Command seals, which he uses in his final fight against Kiritsugu.
Natalia Kaminski (ナタリア・カミンスキー, Nataria Kaminsukī)
Voiced by: Akeno Watanabe (Japanese); Wendee Lee (English)
A freelance mercenary who sold information concerning Noritaka Emiya and his research on vampires. She rescues a young Kiritsugu after the latter kills his father and takes him as her apprentice. During her last mission, she is able to successfully kill a magus that could turn humans into ghouls through magic, but is killed when Kiritsugu shoots down the plane she is on to prevent the infected passengers from killing others when the plane landed. Kiritsugu's last words to her reveal that he viewed her as his mother.
Leysritt (リーゼリット, Rīzeritto) and Sella (セラ, Sera)
Voiced by: Miho Miyagawa (Leysritt) and Haruhi Nanao (Sella) (Japanese); Brianna Knickerbocker (Leysritt) and Rachael McCabe (Sella) (UBW TV) (English), Julia McIlvaine (Heaven's Feel III. spring song)
These two women are Illya's maids, but they act as her caretakers and instruct her in the secrets of sorcery. Like Illya, they both have silky white hair and deep crimson eyes. Sella is rather inconsistent and insecure (especially regarding her body) and suspicious of Shirō Emiya. In contrast, Leysritt is far more casual and affectionate for Shirō because his presence makes Illya happy. Leysritt is skilled in combat, particularly with halberds. She can sacrifice her life to manifest The Dress of Heaven, an artifact of the Einzbern family capable of limited applications of True Magic (魔法, Mahō), miracles that can accomplish impossibilities beyond modern science or sorcery.
Ayako Mitsuzuri (美綴 綾子, Mitsuzuri Ayako)
Voiced by: Fumie Mizusawa (Japanese); Minx Lee (Fate/Stay Night), Brina Palencia (UBW TV) (English)
A stellar athlete and captain of the archery dojo. Ayako and Rin are actively competing to see who will be the first to snag a boyfriend. She is close friends with Shirō, despite her outgoing and extroverted attitude making him uncomfortable, and wishes to see Shirō smile, something she has never seen him do. She is victimized by Rider or Caster early in the story and later found unconscious in an alleyway. In the anime, Ayako is seen with Shinji after her disappearance, although Shinji denies it when asked by Shirō. Ayako often asks Shirō to come to the archery dojo and watch them practice. After she is attacked, Ayako is said to be recovering in hospital but is not seen again.
Yukika Saegusa (三枝 由紀香, Saegusa Yukika)
Voiced by: Eri Nakao (Japanese); Jessica DiCicco (English)
Yukika is the gentle manager of the Track Team, warmly loved by most of her class. She is one of the few people able to see Assassin at the Ryūdō Temple gate and strikes up a conversation with him in Fate/hollow ataraxia.
Kaede Makidera (蒔寺 楓, Makidera Kaede)
Voiced by: Michiru Yuimoto (Japanese); Erica Lindbeck (English)
Kaede is a beautiful but loud and obnoxious sprinter known as the Panther of Homura. A friend of Rin Tōsaka, the two often go window-shopping together. Her hobby is collecting wind chimes.
Kane Himuro (氷室 鐘, Himuro Kane)
Voiced by: Rie Nakagawa (Japanese); Dorothy Elias-Fahn (English)
Kane is one of Yukika and Kaede's friends, a high jumper, and is also the protagonist of Fate/School Life. She is considerate and intelligent. She has feelings for Shirō. Her father is the mayor of Fuyuki City. Her hobby is painting.
Otoko Hotaruzuka (蛍塚音子, Hotaruzuka Otoko)
Otoko is Shirō's employer, and owner of a liquor store, The Copenhagen Bar. She dislikes her given name, Otoko (phonically identical to the Japanese word for "male"), preferring to be called "Neko". She feels attached to Shirō and always addresses him by a pet name, "Emi-yan". "Neko" considers Taiga to be a bad influence on her hard-working employee.
Raiga Fujimura (藤村雷画, Fujimura Raiga)
Better known as the grandfather of Taiga, Raiga is the Oyabun (組長 family head) of a yakuza group operating in Fuyuki City. He was an old friend of Kiritsugu Emiya, and as a favor, managed Kiritsugu's estate after his death in place of Shirō. Due to Taiga's general incompetence, he is also Shirō's de facto guardian, and often takes Shirō hunting or to sumo matches, paying him for his time.
Kishua Zelretch Schweinorg (キシュア・ゼルレッチ・シュバインオーグ, Kishua Zeruretchi Shubainōgu)
Voiced by: Ikuya Sawaki (Japanese); Brook Chalmers (English)
Zelretch is one of five living sorcerers capable of "True Magic." Zelretch's particular miracle is known as the "Kaleidoscope," which gives him dominion over the unlimited alternate realities. Originally introduced in Tsukihime, he makes a cameo appearance in the Heaven's Feel scenario of Fate/Stay Night as Rin's magus teacher. The Jeweled Sword Zelretch featured in the same route is his creation.
Luviagelita Edelfelt (ルヴィアゼリッタ・エーデルフェルト, Ruviazeritta Ēderuferuto)
Voiced by: Shizuka Itō (Japanese); Lauren Landa (English)
A descendant of the Edelfelt family, who participated in the Third Holy Grail War with twin Masters, believing it would be advantageous for them to have two Servants due to their Crest being split in half, though the family has not participated since. Luvia is an outstanding but arrogant student at the Mage's Association and frequently fights with other students, including Rin Tōsaka, her cousin. She is notably famous in the non-magical world due to her job as a professional wrestler, where she is known as the "Forklift Lady" due to her immense strength. Her powers are similar to Rin's. Luvia's first proper appearance is in Fate/hollow ataraxia where she is Shirō's partner and admirer, working with him to investigate mysterious magical incidents on behalf of the Mage's Association. She was later seen in the final episode of the anime series adaptation of Unlimited Blade Works, once again as a fellow student to Rin and Shirō with her affections for the latter and rivalry with the former intact.
Justeaze Lizrich von Einzbern (ユスティーツァ・リズライヒ・フォン・アインツベルン, Yusutītsa Rizuraihi fon Aintsuberun)
Known as the Saint of Winter, Justeaze was a homunculus whose family desired the Holy Grail long before the Holy Grail Wars began. When their attempts continued to fail, the Einzbern reluctantly accepted the aid of the Tōsaka and Makiri (Matō) families, and under the guidance of Zelretch, they formed the Holy Grail Wars. Justeaze agreed to form the core of the Holy Grail; as such, her descendants (Illyasviel von Einzbern and her mother, Irisviel) each contain within their parts of Justeaze's memories and personality as well as a genetic resemblance to her. She also indirectly assists her adoptive descendant Shirō, as it is through her memories that he is able to create a copy of the Jeweled Sword Zelretch near the climax of Heaven's Feel. She is also the cause of Zōken's actions in Heaven's Feel, as Zōken (back when he was still Zolgen) had decided to use the Grail to create world peace as a tribute to his lost love, but eventually forgot due to his ever-advancing age and creeping insanity.
Atrum Galliasta (アトラム・ガリアスタ, Atoramu Gariasuta)
Voiced by: Jun Fukushima (Japanese); Robbie Daymond (English)
The former Master of Caster who was originally mentioned in the visual novel, until his actual appearance in the second anime adaptation of Unlimited Blade Works in which his role was explained. Atrum initially summoned Caster to take advantage of her ability to summon the original dragon of Colchis. However, once Caster stated that while she indeed had the knowledge to summon said dragon but not on how to control it, Atrum dismisses Caster as useless.
Bedivere (ベディヴィエール, Bediviēru)
Voiced by: Mamiko Noto (Fate/Stay Night anime), Shin-ichiro Miki (PS2 port), Mitsuaki Madono (PS Vita port), Mamoru Miyano (Garden of Avalon CD Drama, Fate/Grand Order) (Japanese); Megan Hollingshead (Fate/Stay Night anime)
Max Mittelman (Fate/Grand Order) (English)
One of the Knights of the Round Table, Bedivere, is Altria's caretaker and one of the stewards of the royal court. Only appearing in the final scenes in the Fate Route, he came to serve the young king out of admiration, entrusting his sword to her and working to become her guard. As the years passed up to her passing in the Battle of Camlann, he tended to her in her final moments in her life. He was happy that he finally saw his wish for her: a peaceful sleep that she had never been able to obtain. Happy that he thanked someone another time for giving her peace, he watches over her and asks her if she's watching the continuation of her dream.
Bedivere played a major role in the 6th chapter of Fate/Grand Order as a summonable Saber-class servant in both game and the movie adaptation.

== Reception ==
Chris Klug and Josiah Lebowitz had noted that such use of the heroes of the legends of antiquity could also encourage acquaintance with their original sources in the visual novel. Reviewers often considered Shirou's behavior and his attitude towards his ideals as the "most interesting" and "well-developed" part of the whole novel. Uno Tsunehiro from Kyoto University compared Shirou's traumatic background in regards the city's fire to survivors from the September 11 attacks while also showing different ways the Japanese society used to take care of their lives in such time. As a result, Tsunehiro views Shirou's change in each route as a way to recover from the trauma, grow up and become an independent person. A large number of sudden deaths, coupled with a sharp effect of losing control over the situation, according to the authors of the monograph, gave the gameplay an additional emotional coloring and motivated players to continue playing the game, aided by well-developed plot twists. In his analysis of the magical system and details of the personalities of the characters, Makoto Kuroda sees in the idea of Shirou to become a “champion of justice” a direct analogy with the traditional view of the life of bodhisattvas in Mahayana Buddhism, seeking to save other people at the cost of their own efforts and suffering. In Kuroda's view, Buddhist concepts are opposed to the elements of Christian ethics contained in the plot through the opposition of Shirou and Kirei Kotomine in the form of the main character's rejection of the interpretation of Angra Mainyu as a creature who accepted the sins of others in the name of salvation.

The images of Rin, Saber and Sakura received conflicting ratings. Thus, many reviewers recognized that the psychologically deepest arc is "Heaven's Feel", which is largely due to the sharp and versatile disclosure of the image of Sakura Matou, and her romantic line with Shirou is the most "adult" among all the heroines. Some reviewers commented on Shirou's relationship with Saber and on his growth in Studio Deen's anime that improves their personalities and adds romance to their relationship as the plot progresses. Scenes from the original visual novel that show Shirou having sexual intercourse with the heroines are commonly censored, leading to memes.

There was also commentary about the Fate/Zero cast. Kirtisugu's relationship with Kirei was the subject of praise. The Fandom Post and Blu-ray enjoyed Shirou's characterization in the film, in which his ideals contrast with those of Archer and Kiritusgu, making him notably mature in the story. The Fandom Post enjoyed the handling of Waver's past persona during the dream sequence he has, as he reflects on his past when interacting with Iskander. Anime News Network writers Theron Martin and Michelle Liu listed El-Melloi II as the best anime character of 2019 due to his style when dealing with enemies. Liu regarded him as one of the best LGBTQ+ character, something she found that while it might come across as controversial, both Waver's younger persona from Fate/Zero and Lord El-Melloi II was often commented by writers and him to have developed romantic feelings for Iskandar, something which Iskandar was famous for in real life.

Beside the main Fate series, critics focused on spin-off incarnations. During his debut in Fate/kaleid liner Prisma Illya 3rei!!, Shirou earned praise from Thanasis Karavasilis of MANGA.TOKYO, who said his heroic actions make his first appearance the highlight of the episode. His role in the fighting scenes in the series were well received by Karavasilis, but he received criticism for being overpowered. For the film Oath Under Snow, response to Shirou's protection over Miyu were received positive response, while his characterization also earned praise despite similarities with previous incarnations.
