= Fate/Prototype =

Japanese original video animation

- Key visual for the OVA

フェイト/プロトタイプ (Feito/Purototaipu)
- Genre: Fantasy
- Created by: Type-Moon; Aniplex
- Original video animation
- Directed by: Seiji Kishi
- Written by: Makoto Uezu
- Music by: Yasuharu Takanashi
- Studio: Lerche
- Released: December 31, 2011
- Runtime: 12 minutes
- Light novel

Fate/Prototype: Fragments of Sky Silver
- Written by: Type-Moon; Hikaru Sakurai
- Illustrated by: Nakahara
- Published by: Kadokawa Shoten
- Original run: September 10, 2014 – April 26, 2017
- Volumes: 5
- Light novel

Fate/Labyrinth
- Written by: Type-Moon; Hikaru Sakurai
- Illustrated by: Nakahara
- Published by: Kadokawa Shoten
- Magazine: Comptiq
- Original run: April 10, 2015 – June 10, 2015
- Volumes: 1
- Manga

Fate/Prototype: Fragments of Sky Silver
- Written by: Type-Moon; Hikaru Sakurai; Tsuta Suzuki
- Illustrated by: Tsuta Suzuki
- Published by: Kadokawa Shoten
- English publisher: NA: Yen Press
- Magazine: Type-Moon Comic Ace
- Original run: July 26, 2023 – present
- Volumes: 1
- icon

Fate/Prototype (フェイト/プロトタイプ, Feito/Purototaipu) is a Japanese original video animation distributed with the third home release of Carnival Phantasm. It was directed by Seiji Kishi and animated by Lerche, and was released on December 31, 2011. Makoto Uezu wrote the script, Kazuaki Morita designed the characters, and the music was composed by Yasuharu Takanashi.

The OVA tells the story around the Second Tokyo Holy Grail War, it is the reworked original concept of Kinoko Nasu's for Fate/stay night. It has yet to be adapted as a full series, with only a short animated feature and production notes detailing the story. The prequel story Fate/Prototype: Fragments of Sky Silver has been fully adapted in drama CDs with the same voice actors and actresses. Two light novel series and a manga series were released by Kadokawa Shoten.

== Story ==
=== Setting ===
The system of the War and everything else is much like that from Fate/stay night in some points, but unlike the produced project, the Prototype version has Masters that possess "Master Degrees", which are named following the angelic hierarchy starting from the 7th Order and up (so Princes, Powers, Virtues, Dominions, Thrones, Cherubim, Seraphim).

=== Plot ===
The storyline of Fate/Prototype takes place in its own universe, eight years after the tragic First Holy Grail War also known as the "Heaven's Feel" ritual. Here, the Holy Grail is still the so desired object. However, the darkness contained within the "Holy Grail" is gradually revealed as the characters proceed to struggle against each other win the war.

The story begins with Ayaka Sajo, a magus who is the last surviving member of the Sajyou family who tries to live her life as normally as possible, while avoiding any connection to her past and the Holy Grail War. However, Ayaka's destiny has been sealed since the day when her father and prominent older sister, Manaka Sajyou, were murdered during the First Holy Grail War, eight years ago. Even now, she can still remember the last thing her father said before his death "You have no choice but to enter into the Heaven's Feel".

On the eighth anniversary of the death of her family, Ayaka has a mysterious encounter with Sancraid Phahn who warns her that the Second Holy Grail War is about to begin and that she can't run away from it. Later that night, Ayaka is pursued by a mysterious man with vicious creatures, who stabs her with his weapon. She is saved just in time by a holy radiance that summons a warrior who saves her. Now, Ayaka has no choice but to enter into the Second Holy Grail War and survive.

== Characters ==
=== Main characters ===
Ayaka Sajyou (沙条 綾香, Sajyou Ayaka)
Voiced by: Kana Hanazawa
Ayaka is the previous protagonist of Kinoko Nasu's original Fate/stay night, later replaced by Shirou Emiya. She appears to be a very insecure person, traumatized after the previous Holy Grail War after her father and sister died because of it, and not willing to join the current one. On the anniversary of her father and sister's death she is pursued by Lancer much like Shirou. She is also saved at the last moment by her Servant, Saber. Her position as Master is under The Seventh, Princes.
Saber (セイバー, Seibā; –) Arthur Pendragon (アーサー・ペンドラゴン, Āsā Pendoragon)
Voiced by: Takahiro Sakurai
Saber is the male version of the female Saber. He responded to and accepted the summons of Ayaka in time to save her life from Lancer who had been pursuing her. Saber shows the sense of values of a matured man, as well as a strong sense of justice.

=== Supporting characters ===
Archer's master
He is the Master of Archer. He's the owner and president of a skyscraper that overlooks the city. Little is known about him other than that he is a careful person to the end.
Archer (アーチャー, Āchā; –) Gilgamesh (ギルガメッシュ, Girugamesshu)
Voiced by: Yuichi Nakamura
Archer is the previous version of Fate/stay night's Archer. He is the most self-centered person in the world and wishes to be the highest ranking Servant. Having two above him enraged him to the point where he wanted to kill his own Master.
Aro Isemi (伊勢三 杏路, Isemi Aro)
Voiced by: Megumi Ogata
Aro is the Master of Rider. He has the appearance of a 10-year-old boy, a victim of a "chimerization" experiment by the unknown antagonist of the last War. At the beginning of this War, he was entirely sustained by medical machinery. His position as Master is under The Third, Thrones.
Perseus (ペルセウス, Peruseusu; –) Rider (ライダー, Raidā)
Voiced by: Mamoru Miyano
Perseus is a servant that was to be used in the original Fate/stay night, but was redesigned and briefly shown in Fate/hollow ataraxia. He hated his master for being weak, but sympathizes with the magus' plight and befriends with him, prior to his death. Rider fights alone for the one wish to resurrect his master.
Misaya Reiroukan (玲瓏館 美沙夜, Reiroukan Misaya)
Voiced by: Chiwa Saitō
Misaya is the previous version of Rin Tohsaka. She is a proud and cruel, yet elegant noblewoman. Misaya is the Master of Lancer and the one who ordered Lancer to track down Ayaka in order to eliminate her. Misaya's position as Master is under The Second, Cherubim.

Lancer (ランサー, Ransā) – Cú Chulainn (クー・フーリン, Kū Fūrin)

Voiced by: Kazuya Nakai
Lancer is the previous version of Fate/stay night's Lancer. He acts like a normal Servant under the commands of his Master, Misaya Reiroukan. Despite having his Noble Phantasm sealed by her and her personality, he likes her, as she reminds him of his teacher.
Sancraid Phahn (サンクレイド・ファーン, Sankureido Fān)
Voiced by: Takehito Koyasu
Sancraid is the prototype version of Kirei Kotomine. He appears as a complete maniac, switching between a kind persona and an evil psychotic one that is completely obsessed with the Grail. He's the Master of Berserker. Sancraid's position as Master is under VOID, Absence.
Berserker (バーサーカー, Bāsākā) – Heracles (ヘラクレス, Herakuresu)
Heracles is the prototype version of Hercules and servant of Sancraid Phahn.
Manaka Sajyou (沙条 愛歌, Sajyou Manaka)
Voiced by: Aki Toyosaki
Manaka is the previous version of Illyasviel von Einzbern. She is the older sister of Ayaka and the previous Master of Saber. Manaka is also the one responsible for the tragedy that occurred in the last War. She now acts as the Master of Beast. Her position as Master is under The First, Seraphim.
Beast of 666 (666 no Kemono; –) Beast VI/G (ビーストⅥ/Ｇ)
The Servant of Manaka who is the 666th Beast of The Apocalypse of John of Patmos and the manifestation of the sins and desires of men. The complete materialization of the Beast is the entire purpose of the Heaven's Feel system. It is similar in concept to that of Avenger. It is born out of the Grail being filled with the Evil, Greedy Intentions of Humanity, rather than Good Intentions.

=== Minor characters ===
Hiroki Sajyou (沙条 広樹, Sajyou Hiroki?)
Voiced by: Hiroki Tōchi
Hiroki a magus and the father of Manaka and Ayaka who died during the course of the First Holy Grail War in 1991. In Fate/Prototype Fragments of Sky Silver prequel, he shows regret at not being a better father to Ayaka and Manaka.

== Development ==
The original version of Fate/stay night, originally called Fate Skipper (フェイト・スキッパー, Feito Sukippā) and now referred to as Old Fate (旧Fate, Kyū Fate) and Fate Origin, was a novel that Nasu wrote during high school, eventually being mostly redesigned as a visual novel to suit the target audience. They were reluctant to completely abandon many of the "original charms" that were discarded, and they had wished to utilize them somehow with each passing year. Twenty years after originally being penned, they decided to make use of the release of Carnival Phantasm, discarding other proposals like Princess Arcueid VS Saber Lily or a scene from Tsukihime 2, to "just once, return to the original" for the company's belated tenth anniversary.

They decided to frame the animation like a movie trailer, utilizing the best parts and still telling the story properly. Nasu feels that the main idea of the work was in the style of an '80s romance, "A story of revolutionizing the world", and took great interest in returning to the work. The large difference in obtaining the Holy Grail from the original to the final product in Fate/stay night can be said to represent the changing trends of the period.

== Media ==
=== Light novel ===
==== Fate/Prototype: Fragments of Sky Silver ====
No.	Release date	ISBN
1	September 10, 2014	978-4-04-102127-9
2	October 10, 2014	978-4-04-102128-6
3	March 26, 2015	978-4-04-102452-2
4	March 10, 2016	978-4-04-102453-9
5	April 26, 2017	978-4-04-103144-5

==== Fate/Labyrinth ====
No.	Release date	ISBN
1	January 9, 2016	978-4-04-103595-5

=== Manga ===
No.	Original release date	Original ISBN	North American release date	North American ISBN
1	December 26, 2024	978-4-04-115266-9; 978-4-04-115265-2 (SE)	October 27, 2026	979-8-8554-3712-6
