= Fate/Grand Carnival =

Japanese OVA comedy series

- Original video animation
- Directed by: Seiji Kishi
- Written by: Makoto Uezu
- Music by: Keita Haga; Yasuharu Takanashi
- Studio: Lerche
- Released: 31 December 2020 – 2 June 2021
- Episodes: 2

Fate/Grand Carnival is a two-part comedy OVA based on Type-Moon and Lasengle's gacha mobile game Fate/Grand Order. It is the successor to the series Carnival Phantasm.

== Content ==
Fate/Grand Carnival is comedy anime OVA series based on Type-Moon and Lasengle's gacha mobile game Fate/Grand Order. It is a spiritual successor to the earlier series Carnival Phantasm. The series consists of shorts and sketches that feature characters from the game in humorous and absurd situations. The series has two 30-minute episodes, which are officially refereed to as seasons.

Fate/Grand Carnival features the same opening theme, "Super☆Affection", as the earlier Carnival Phantasm, this time performed by Mash Kyrielight (Rie Takahashi), Nitocris (Minami Tanaka), Elizabeth Báthory (Rumi Okubo), Shuten-douji (Aoi Yūki), Ibaraki-douji (Nao Toyama), Medb (Ayane Sakura), Atalanta (Saori Hayami), Mysterious Heroine X (Ayako Kawasumi), Ishtar (Kana Ueda), Nero Claudius (Sakura Tange) and Sitonai (Mai Kadowaki). The series ending theme "Wonderful Carnival" was performed by Masaaki Endoh. Endoh had previously performed "Fellows", the ending theme for Carnival Phantasm.

== Release ==
Fate/Grand Carnival was first teased in early December 2020, when a new official Fate/Grand Order Twitter account was created and posted an image referencing Carnival Phantasm. The first season of Fate/Grand Carnival premiered as part of Type-Moon's 2021 New Year's Eve TV special.

In Japan, the first season was released on Blu-ray on June 2, 2021. It also included 128 page book titled Endless Carnival, which comics and illustrations from the animators of the OVA. After a few delays, the second season was released on Blu-ray on October 13 2021. A series of five illustrated B2 size wall tapestries were also made available to those who purchased both seasons together.

In America, both seasons were released on Blu-ray in English in dubbed and subtitled formats by Aniplex of America on October 11, 2022. Both seasons were also released on the streaming platform Crunchyroll. Both seasons were released as a single-volume Blu-ray by MVM Entertainment in the United Kingdom on April 6, 2026.

== Reception ==
Anime News Network recommended the series for hardcore fans of Fate/Grand Order, but said viewers not familiar with the game would not enjoy it. They also said that it wasn't as consistently funny as Carnival Phantasm. DoubleSama also warned viewers that whereas Carnival Phantasm was made Type-moon fans in general, Fate/Grand Carnival was made specifically for fans of Fate/Grand Order and that fans of Carnival Phantasm likely wouldn't get many of the references.

The fast pacing and short length of the series has also been criticized.
