= Yasuharu Takanashi =

Japanese composer (born 1963)

Yasuharu Takanashi 高梨 康治
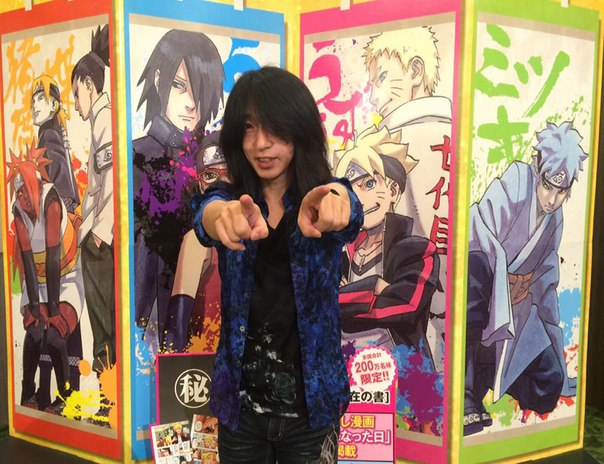

Background information
- Born: April 13, 1963 (age 63)
- Origin: Tokyo, Japan
- Genres: Anison; VGM; music score; heavy metal; hard rock; electronica; folk
- Occupations: Composer; arranger
- Instruments: Keyboards; sampler
- Website: www.rockman.co.jp

Yasuharu Takanashi (高梨 康治, Takanashi Yasuharu; born April 13, 1963) is a prolific Japanese composer and arranger for anime and video game series. His anime composition credits include Naruto Shippuden, Fairy Tail, Sailor Moon Crystal, Log Horizon, Shiki, Hell Girl, and Record of Ragnarok.

== Biography ==
Takanashi was born in Tokyo, in 1963. At the age of 18, he began playing keyboard, later working as the keyboardist for the band Hellen. In 1993, he formed the group Planet Earth with a Hellen's guitarist and others, releasing the album Big Bang in the same year.

In the late 1990s, he joined Musashi Project, a rock band which features traditional Japanese musical instruments. In 2002, alongside Musashi and Toshio Masuda, he made his debut as a composer in the anime series Naruto, writing the track "Sadness and Sorrow".

He is currently the leader of the group Yaiba, which co-composes some of Takanashi's soundtrack works.

Takanashi has received the JASRAC International Award for the soundtrack of Naruto Shippuden five times—in 2013, 2014, 2017, 2020 and 2021.

== Works ==
=== Anime ===
Year	Title	Co-composer(s)	Note(s)	Ref(s)
2002	Naruto	Toshio Masuda and Musashi Project	Recomposed "Sadness and Sorrow" for Shippuden	
2003	Beyblade G-Revolution			
2003	New Fist of the North Star	Yaiba		
2004	Soreike! Zukkoke Sanningumi			
2004	Gantz	Natsuki Sogawa	From episode 6 onwards	
2005	Idaten Jump			
2005	Hell Girl	Hiromi Mizutani		
2006	Ayakashi: Samurai Horror Tales			
2006	Poka Poka Mori no Rascal			
2006	The Wallflower	Hiromi Mizutani		
2006	Hell Girl: Two Mirrors	Hiromi Mizutani		
2007	Bird's Song			
2007	Naruto Shippuden			
2007	Ikki Tousen: Dragon Destiny			
2007	Toward the Terra			
2007	Mononoke			
2008	My Bride is a Mermaid			
2008	Our Home's Fox Deity			
2008	Itazura na Kiss			
2008	Ikki Tousen: Great Guardians			
2008	Hyakko	Tsunku, Hiromi Mizutani and Kenji Fujisawa		
2008	Hell Girl: Three Vessels	Hiromi Mizutani and Kenji Fujisawa		
2008	My Bride is a Mermaid OVA			
2009	Fresh Pretty Cure!			
2009	Kon'nichiwa Anne: Before Green Gables	Hiromi Mizutani and Kenji Fujisawa		
2009	Fairy Tail			
2010	HeartCatch PreCure!			
2010	Ikki Tousen: Xtreme Xecutor			
2010	Shiki			
2011	Beelzebub	Kenji Fujisawa		
2011	Suite PreCure			
2011	Ikki Tousen: Shūgaku Tōshi Keppu-roku			
2011	Carnival Phantasm			
2011	Fate/Prototype			
2012	Smile PreCure!			
2012	The Ambition of Oda Nobuna			
2013	The Severing Crime Edge			
2013	Dust	Jason Gallaty		
2013	Fantasista Doll			
2013	Log Horizon			
2013	Neppu Kairiku Bushi Road			
2014	Z/X Ignition			
2014	Show by Rock!!	Rega Sound		
2014	Dragon Ball Z Kai: The Final Chapters	Norihito Sumitomo and Yo Yamazaki	Composer of insert song "Let it Burn"	
2014	Pretty Guardian Sailor Moon Crystal Season I			
2014	Log Horizon 2			
2014	Francesca	Shūji Katayama		
2014	Fairy Tail (2014)			
2014	Gonna be the Twin-Tail!!			
2015	The Testament of Sister New Devil			
2015	Pretty Guardian Sailor Moon Crystal Season II			
2015	Show by Rock!! 2	Rega Sound		
2015	Journey to the West: Surprise			
2015	Ikki Tousen: Extravaganza Epoch			
2016	Pretty Guardian Sailor Moon Crystal Season III			
2016	Super Lovers	Shūji Katayama		
2016	The Morose Mononokean			
2016	Kaiju Girls			
2016	Tiger Mask W			
2016	ĒlDLIVE			
2016	All Out!!			
2016	Fairy Tail Zero			
2017	Tsugumomo			
2017	Boruto: Naruto Next Generations			
2017	Genbanojou	Shuji Katayama		
2017	Hell Girl: Fourth Twilight			
2017	Yuri's World		Composer of 2 tracks	
2018	Killing Bites			
2018	The Testament of Sister New Devil Departures		Recycled tracks	
2018	GeGeGe no Kitarō	Yaiba		
2018	Zombie Land Saga			
2018	Fairy Tail: Final Series			
2018	Bakugan: Battle Planet			
2019	Ikki Tousen: Western Wolves			
2019	Ultramarine Magmell			
2019	Kengan Ashura			
2020	Show By Rock!! Mashumairesh!!			
2020	Tsugu Tsugumomo			
2020	Talentless Nana			
2021	Log Horizon: Destruction of the Round Table			
2021	Show By Rock!! Stars!!			
2021	Fate/Grand Carnival	Keita Haga		
2021	Record of Ragnarok			
2021	Tsukimichi: Moonlit Fantasy			
2021	Taisho Otome Fairy Tale			
2022	Shin Ikki Tousen			
2022	Bastard!! -Heavy Metal, Dark Fantasy-			
2022	Tokyo Mew Mew New			
2022	Shine On! Bakumatsu Bad Boys!			
2022	Reincarnated as a Sword			
2023	Farming Life in Another World	Johannes Nilsson		
2024	Gushing over Magical Girls	Akinari Suzuki and Johannes Nilsson		
2024	Kinnikuman Kanpeki Chо̄jin Shiso-hen			
2024	Baki Hanma vs. Kengan Ashura			
2025	From Old Country Bumpkin to Master Swordsman			
2025	Mechanical Marie	Johannes Nilsson		

=== Anime films ===
Year	Title	Co-composer(s)	Note(s)	Ref(s)
2007	Naruto Shippuden the Movie			
2008	Naruto Shippuden the Movie: Bonds			
2009	Pretty Cure All Stars DX: Everyone's Friends - the Collection of Miracles!	Naoki Satō		
2009	Naruto Shippuden the Movie: The Will of Fire			
2009	Fresh Pretty Cure! The Kingdom of Toys has Lots of Secrets!?			
2010	Pretty Cure All Stars DX2: Light of Hope - Protect the Rainbow Jewel!	Naoki Satō	Recycled tracks	
2010	Naruto Shippuden the Movie: The Lost Tower		Composer for the film and The Three Wishes short	
2010	HeartCatch PreCure! the Movie: Fashion Show in the Flower Capital... Really?!			
2010	Halo Legends	Martin O'Donnell, Michael Salvatori, Naoyuki Hiroko, Tetsuya Takahashi, Tilman Sillescu, Alexander Roeder, Alex Pfeffer, Markus Schmidt, Robin Hoffmann, Marco Jovic, and David Christiansen		
2011	Suite PreCure The Movie: Take it back! The Miraculous Melody that Connects Hearts!			
2011	Naruto Shippuden the Movie: Blood Prison	Yaiba		
2012	Pretty Cure All Stars New Stage: Friends of the Future			
2012	Road to Ninja: Naruto the Movie			
2012	Fairy Tail the Movie: Phoenix Priestess			
2012	Smile PreCure! the Movie: Big Mismatch in a Picture Book!			
2013	Pretty Cure All Stars New Stage 2: Friends of the Heart			
2014	The Last: Naruto the Movie			
2014	Pretty Cure All Stars New Stage 3: Eternal Friends			
2015	Pretty Cure All Stars: Spring Carnival♪			
2015	Boruto: Naruto the Movie			
2017	Fairy Tail: Dragon Cry			
2021	Pretty Guardian Sailor Moon Eternal The Movie			
2023	Pretty Guardian Sailor Moon Cosmos The Movie			
2025	Zombie Land Saga: Yumeginga Paradise			

=== Video games ===
Year	Title	Co-composer(s)	Ref(s)
2002	Maximum Chase		
2003	Dinosaur Hunting		
2003	Super Robot Wars Scramble Commander		
2005	Genji: Dawn of the Samurai		
2005	Beat Down: Fist of Vengeance		
2006	Genji: Days of the Blade		
2007	Pachi-Slot Sengoku Musou, Yamasa Digi World SP: Pachi-Slot Sengoku Musou		
2007	Super Robot Wars Scramble Commander the 2nd		
2008	Neoromance Stage: In the Time of Being Far Away ~ Mai One night ~	Kenji Fujisawa	
2008	Neoromance Stage: In the Middle of a Distant Time ~ Obtain Prevention ~	Kenji Fujisawa	
2012	Onimusha Soul	Kenji Fujisawa, Hiromi Mizutani and Hiroshi Motofuji	
2014	J-Stars Victory VS		
2016	Celestial Arculs		
2019	Decisive Battle! Heiankyo		
2019	Dragon Raja		
2020	Shan Hai Jing Hua		
2021	Gate of Nightmares		

=== Television dramas ===
Year	Title	Co-composer(s)	Ref(s)
2003	Chouseishin Gransazer		
2004	Tokyo Wankei	Yiruma	
2004	Genseishin Justirisers	Kenji Kojima	
2007	Kawaii! JeNny		
2013	Fire Leon	Kenji Fujisawa	
2018	Ultraman R/B		

=== Live-action films ===
Year	Title	Co-composer(s)	Ref(s)
2008	GeGeGe no Kitarō: The Millennium Curse	Taku Izumi	

=== Drama CDs ===
Year	Title	Note(s)	Ref(s)
2002	Z/ETA Drama CD		
2007	Shabake: Usuo Usuo		
2009	Mikarun X		
2012	Maou Yu Demon King: Female Knight in the Country of Flowers		
2012	Maou Yu Demon King: One King, Two Roads		
2013	Fantasista Doll: Special	Composer for 6 episodes	
2013	Log Horizon: Gold of the Kunie 7 Offering Golden		
2013	The Severing Crime Edge: Futari no Sonomae	Recycled tracks	
2013	Maou Yu Demon King: Yuge Gaidai Dunes National Archery	Composer for part 1 and 2	
2014	Maou Yu Demon King Hero Declaration: An Unnamed Girl Shouts	Recycled tracks	
2018	The Testament of Sister New Devil Blu-ray BOX Ecstasy CD		

== Discography ==
=== With Hellen ===
Year	Title	Ref(s)
1985	Talon of King	

=== With Planet Earth ===
Year	Title	Ref(s)
1993	Big Bang	

=== With Musashi ===
Year	Title	Ref(s)
1998	Far East Groove	
2000	Yamato	
2001	Musashi with Ryudo Uzaki	
2002	Miyamoto Musashi	
