= Carnival Phantasm =

Japanese OVA comedy series

- Carnival Phantasm Complete Edition Blu-Ray cover

カーニバル・ファンタズム (Kānibaru Fantazumu)
- Genre: Comedy, parody
- Manga

Take-Moon
- Written by: Eri Takenashi
- Published by: Ichijinsha
- Original run: June 25, 2003 – September 24, 2005
- Volumes: 2
- Original video animation
- Directed by: Seiji Kishi
- Produced by: Yūji Higa
- Written by: Makoto Uezu
- Music by: Yasuharu Takanashi
- Studio: Lerche
- Released: August 12, 2011 – July 7, 2012
- Runtime: 8–20 minutes
- Episodes: 16

Carnival Phantasm (Japanese: カーニバル・ファンタズム, Hepburn: Kānibaru Fantazumu) is a comedy OVA series based on Eri Takenashi's Type-Moon gag manga, Take-Moon (テイク・ムーン, Teiku Mūn). It focuses on absurd situations happening to each characters of Fate/stay night, Melty Blood, and Tsukihime. It is followed by a spiritual sequel known as Fate/Grand Carnival. Another Type-Moon OVA, Fate/kaleid liner Prisma Illya: Prisma Phantasm, is of a similar premise.

== Plot ==
The Ahnenerbe is a pub temporarily appearing among parallel worlds. Once every ten years, an event called "The Carnival Moment" occurs, where tales from other dimensions and worlds cross paths for characters from various tales to encounter each other. A multitude of characters from Type-Moon meet, mainly from Fate/stay night and Tsukihime. They are subjected to a series of situations and parody not seen in every respective games.

== Development ==
The series was developed in order to celebrate the tenth anniversary of TYPE-MOON. The third season included the 12-minute special anime Fate/Prototype.

== Media ==
=== Manga ===
Take-Moon published the series in Comic Ichijinsha with two volumes published between June 25, 2004, and August 9, 2006. A reprint of 1 volume was published on November 26, 2011, with print and kindle versions retailed.

=== Anime ===
The series is produced by Lerche, directed by Seiji Kishi, written by Makoto Uezu, and composed by Yasuharu Takanashi. The January issue of Ichijinsha's Monthly Comic Rex magazine announced that Take-Moon would receive an anime adaptation.

It was released in seasons which each has four episodes. The first season was released on August 12, 2011, the second one on October 28, and the third one on December 31. An extra episode titled "Carnival Phantasm EX Season" was released together with the omnibus version of the Take-Moon manga on November 26, 2011. A Take Moon special edition was announced on October 10, 2011.

The first season was released on Blu-ray in Japan on August 14, 2011, and the second one on October 28. A complete edition was announced on February 8, 2015. It was released on April 30.

The opening theme song is "Super☆Affection" by Minami Kuribayashi, Miyuki Hashimoto, Faylan, Aki Misato, Yozuca*, and Rino, and the ending theme song is "Fellows" by Masaaki Endoh. In episode 11, the ending theme song is "Final Dead Lancer", composed by Yasuharu Takanashi.

==== List of episodes ====
No.	Title	Original release date
1	"The 5th Great Clash of the Magicians: The Holy Grail War"; Transliteration: "Dai-go-ji Majutsushi Dai-gekitosu Chikichiki Seihai Sensō" (Japanese: 第5次魔術師大激突チキチキ聖杯戦争)	August 12, 2011
The characters of Fate/stay night host the Holy Grail War on the game show.
2	"Badump! Melty Blood"; Transliteration: "Doki Meruti Buraddo" (Japanese: ドキッ☆メルティブラッド)	August 12, 2011
The female characters of Tsukihime play a game of beach volleyball.
3	"It's a Daydream Everywhere"; Transliteration: "Dokodemo Hinata no Yume" (Japanese: どこでもヒナタノユメ)	August 12, 2011
Arcueid attends the school with Shiki and Ilya makes mischief with magic.
4	"Badump! Date Super Plan"; Transliteration: "Dokidoki Dēto Dai-sakusen" (Japanese: ドキドキデート大作戦)	August 12, 2011
Shiro asks Rin to record the show for him, but it turns out to be too much for her. The characters of Fate/stay night and Tsukihime, meet and discuss their problems namely how they can accomplish dating all the girls of their respective games on the same day.
5	"Berserker's First Errand"; Transliteration: "Bāsākā Hajimete no Otsukai" (Japanese: バーサーカー はじめてのおつかい)	October 28, 2011
While sent on an errand for his master, Berserker unknowingly finishes the Holy Grail War.
6	"Type-Moon Serial TV Novel Sakura"; Transliteration: "Katasuki Renzoku Terebi Shōsetsu Sakura" (Japanese: 型月連続テレビ小説 さくら)	October 28, 2011
Rider defends Sakura from Shinji.
7	"An Expert Gift"; Transliteration: "Tsū na Okurimono" (Japanese: 通な贈り物)	October 28, 2011
Arcueid makes okonomiyaki for Shiki. Caster spends her time on inner workings with a hidden Otaku.
8	"Saber at Work"; Transliteration: "Hataraku Seibā" (Japanese: はたらくセイバー)	October 28, 2011
Saber works at Ahnenerbe, but it ends in chaos.
Special	"Ilya's Castle"; Transliteration: "Iriya Jō" (Japanese: イリヤ城)	October 28, 2011
A playthrough of the Fate/hollow ataraxia minigame, Ilya's Castle, the voice actors of Fate/stay night provide a hilarious live commentary in-character.
EX	"EX Season"	November 26, 2011
Caren Ortensia attempts to control the world with money with varying degrees of success. Phantas-Moon receives a film adaption of the series and Shiki is involved in a love plot.
9	"Holy Grail Grand Prix"; Transliteration: "Seihai Granprix"	December 31, 2011
The Masters and Servants enter a road race to win the holy grail. Grail appears to offer Shinji questionable advice.
10	"Loli Reversion"; Transliteration: "Sennō Tantei Rori Gaeri" (Japanese: 洗脳探偵ロリ返り)	December 31, 2011
Shiki accompanies Akiha, after her personality reverts to that of a child. Kohaku creates stories based on Hisui's detective persona with comical results.
11	"Final Dead Lancer"	December 31, 2011
Grail warns Lancer of his impending death.
12	"Badump! Date Super Plan - Answer"; Transliteration: "Dokidoki Dēto Dai-sakusen - Kaitō-hen" (Japanese: ドキドキデート大作戦 解答編)	December 31, 2011
A continuation of Episode 4 "Badump! Date Super Plan". Shiki and Shiro inadvertently invite all girls at once in a single day with a disastrous result. The Ahnenerbe holds a party to celebrate the end of the series, and it includes various characters, who did not appear in the series from Fate/Zero, Fate/hollow ataraxia, The Garden of Sinners, and Notes. The final scene features the voice of Ayaka Sajou on the telephone.
-	"Fate/Prototype"	December 31, 2011
Fate/Prototype is a digest version of the original novel concept of Fate/stay night, and follows Ayaka Sajō, a male version of Saber and a prototype Lancer.
Special	"HibiChika Special"; Transliteration: "HibiChika Supesharu" (ひびちかスペシャル)	July 7, 2012
A new episode of the series released on the Type-Moon Fes - 10th Anniversary Event - Blu-ray.
