= Fate/kaleid liner Prisma Illya: Licht - The Nameless Girl =

2021 Japanese animated film

- Key visual of the film.
- Fate/kaleid liner プリズマ☆イリヤ Licht 名前の無い少女
- Directed by: Shin Oonuma
- Written by: Hazuki Minase; Kenji Inoue
- Produced by: Hayato Kaneko; Hiroo Saitō; Noritomo Isogai; Sojiro Arimizu; Terushige Yoshie; Toshinori Fujiwara
- Starring: Mai Kadowaki; Kaori Nazuka; Chiwa Saitō; Hitomi Nabatame; Kana Ueda; Naoko Takano; Natsuki Hanae; Noriaki Sugiyama; Rie Kugimiya; Shizuka Itō; Sumire Morohoshi; Yumi Kakazu
- Music by: Tatsuya Katō; Tomohisa Ishikawa
- Production company: Silver Link
- Distributed by: Kadokawa Animation (Japan); Section23 Films (United States)
- Release date: 27 August 2021
- Running time: 95 minutes
- Country: Japan
- Language: Japanese

Fate/kaleid liner Prisma Illya: Licht - The Nameless Girl (Japanese: Fate/kaleid liner プリズマ☆イリヤ Licht 名前の無い少女, Hepburn: Fate/kaleid liner Prisma Illya Licht - Namae no Nai Shōjo) is a 2021 Japanese animated fantasy action film. The film is based on Hiroshi Hiroyama's manga series Fate/kaleid liner Prisma Illya and is part of Type-Moon's Fate franchise. The film is a sequel to the 2017 film Fate/kaleid liner Prisma Illya: Vow in the Snow and a continuation of the Fate/kaleid liner Prisma Illya anime series.

== Voice cast ==
Character	Voice actor
Illyasviel von Einzbern	Mai Kadowaki
Miyu Edelfelt	Kaori Nazuka
Chloe von Einzbern	Chiwa Saitō
Bazett Fraga McRemitz	Hitomi Nabatame
Rin Tohsaka	Kana Ueda
Julian Ainsworth	Natsuki Hanae
Shirou Emiya	Noriaki Sugiyama
Beatrice Flowerchild	Rie Kugimiya
Luviagelita Edelfelt	Shizuka Itō
Erika Ainsworth	Sumire Morohoshi
Magical Ruby	Naoko Takano
Magical Sapphire	Yumi Kakazu

== Production ==
On May 21, 2020, the official Fate/kaleid liner Prisma Illya website announced that a new film was in production. It was also announced that Mai Kadowaki would be reprising her role as Illyasviel von Einzbern. On December 17, 2020, it was revealed on the official Prisma Illya Twitter account that the title of the new film would be Fate/kaleid liner Prisma Illya: Licht – Namae no Nai Shōjo.

The film's theme song, "Just the Truth", was performed by Minami Kuribayashi. She had previously performed the theme song for Fate/kaleid liner Prisma Illya 2wei, the second season of the Prisma Illya anime series.

=== Marketing ===
In February 2021, an image gallery of over 200 pieces of artwork related to Fate/kaleid liner Prisma Illya anime series was posted to the official Prisma Illya website to promote the film. The gallery contained images related all four Prisma Illya anime seasons, the previous film Fate/kaleid liner Prisma Illya: Vow in the Snow, the OVA Fate/kaleid liner Prisma Illya: Prisma Phantasm, and the game and novel adaptations. A Valentine's Day-themed event was held at Machi Asobi Cafe in Tokyo between February 16 to February 28th to promote the film.

For two weeks after the film's release in Japan, a limited time event was held in the mobile game Fate/Grand Order, which is also a part of the Fate franchise. During the event, the characters Illyasviel von Einzbern and Miyu Edelfelt were given increased odds of being obtained through the game's gacha summoning system. The film also had a limited collaborative event with the mobile mahjong game Mahjong Soul November 2023. The characters Illya, Miyu, Kuro, and Gil were added to the game, along with other items inspired by the film.

In 2024, a pop-up shop selling merchandise themed around the film was opened in Shinjuku, Japan from May 18 to June 2.

== Release ==
Fate/kaleid liner Prisma Illya: Licht - The Nameless Girl premiered in theaters Japan on August 27, 2021. The film also had a limited theatrical release in several other Asian countries. In 2021, it premiered in Hong Kong on December 2nd, in Taiwan on December 3rd, and in both Malaysia and Singapore on December 9th. In 2022, it premiered in Sri Lanka on February 3rd and Thailand on March 5th. It did not have a theatrical release in the United States.

The film was released on DVD and Blu-ray in Japan on March 30, 2022. The Blue-ray version was released in regular and limited editions.

The film was released in North America on the streaming platform Hidive on May 11, 2022. The film was also released on Blu-ray by Sentai Filmworks in North America on October 4, 2022.

== Reception ==
Richard Eisenbeis of Anime News Network gave the film an overall "B" rating. His main issue with the film was that the main moral dilemma of the story was sidestepped by lore and backstory. While the film was ostensibly about Illya grappling with having to choose whether to save the world or save her friend, much of the film was dedicated to explaining the antagonist's plan and giving backstory to the villains. Eisenbeis also criticized the film for ending on a cliffhanger, without the main dilemma being resolved. He did, however, praise the film's animation and the choreography of the fight scenes, and said that they hold up in comparison with Ufotable's adaptations of Fate/Stay Night. Eisenbeis concluded that the film a "must watch" for fans of the Prisma Illya series as it does continue the main story of the series. He also noted that film would not be a good introduction to the series for fans of other parts of the Fate franchise and recommended that those fans start at the beginning of the anime series.

== Legacy ==
In August 2021, at a stage greeting event for the film's release, it was announced that the film would be getting a sequel. In August 2023 at an event celebrating the 10th anniversary of the Fate/kaleid liner Prisma Illya anime series, a teaser image for the sequel film was shown. The series's official Twitter account also announced that the film was in production. In July 2026, it was announced that the sequel would be a new anime series titled Fate/kaleid liner Prisma Illya Finale.
