= List of Fate (franchise) films =

Fate
- The Fate series logo
- Based on: Fate by Type-Moon
- Production company: Studio Deen / Ufotable / Silver Link
- Distributed by: Aniplex; Crunchyroll
- Country: Japan
- Language: Japanese

Fate is a media franchise created by the Japanese video game company Type-Moon, and follows the Holy Grail War; a battle between mages that are divided into two categories called "Masters" and their "Servants". As of March 2026, there have been 8 animated films. The films were produced by multiple animation studios including Studio Deen, Ufotable, NBCUniversal Entertainment, and Silver Link. Most of the films were distributed in Japan by Aniplex and Crunchyroll, while various studios distributed the films worldwide. The first Fate animated film, Fate/stay night: Unlimited Blade Works, was released in Japan in 2010.

== Films ==
List of Fate films
2010	Fate/stay night: Unlimited Blade Works
2011
2012
2013
2014
2015
2016
2017	Fate/kaleid liner Prisma Illya: Vow in the Snow
2017	Fate/stay night: Heaven's Feel I. presage flower
2018
2019	Fate/stay night: Heaven's Feel II. lost butterfly
2020	Fate/stay night: Heaven's Feel III. spring song
2020	Fate/Grand Order - Divine Realm of the Round Table: Camelot - Wandering
2021	Fate/Grand Order: Final Singularity-Grand Temple of Time: Solomon
2021	Fate/Grand Order - Divine Realm of the Round Table: Camelot - Paladin
2021	Fate/kaleid liner Prisma Illya: Licht - The Nameless Girl

=== Fate/Stay Night: Unlimited Blade Works ===
Fate/stay night: Unlimited Blade Works is a 2010 Japanese animated action film directed by Yūji Yamaguchi. It is the first film in the Fate franchise and was released following the 2006 release of the anime television adaption of Fate/stay night. The story follows the tenth anniversary of the great fire of Fuyuki City, Rin Tohsaka performs the summoning ritual and summons Archer.

=== Fate/Kaleid liner Prisma Illya: Vow in the Snow ===
Fate/kaleid liner Prisma Illya: Vow in the Snow (Note: Japanese: 劇場版Fate/kaleid liner プリズマ☆イリヤ 雪下の誓い, Hepburn: Gekijō-ban Fate/kaleid liner Purizuma ☆ Iriya Sekka no Chikai) (also known as Oath Under Snow) is a Japanese animated fantasy action film and a prequel to the manga Fate/kaleid liner Prisma Illya by Hiroshi Hiroyama, released on August 26, 2017. The plot follows a teenager named Shirou Emiya who becomes involved in the mage conflict known as the Fifth Holy Grail War to protect his foster sister, Miyu Satsuki, from being used as a sacrifice by the Ainsworth clan.

=== Fate/Stay Night: Heaven's Feel ===
Fate/stay night: Heaven's Feel is a Japanese urban fantasy anime film trilogy produced by Ufotable, directed by Tomonori Sudō, and written by Akira Hiyama. It adapts Heaven's Feel, the third and final route of the Fate/stay night visual novel. The trilogy focuses on high school students Shirou Emiya and Sakura Matou who are affected by a conflict between mages known as the Holy Grail War.

The first film in the trilogy, titled Presage Flower premiered in Japan on October 14, 2017, and was directed by Tomonori Sudō. Its English dub had premiered on June 5 and June 7, 2018 in the United States. While second film, titled Lost Butterfly premiered in Japan on January 12, 2019. Aniplex of America released the film in the United States in March 2019. The third and final film, titled Spring Song, premiered in Japan on August 15, 2020, and premiered in the United States on November 18 of the same year.

=== Fate/Grand Order - Divine Realm of the Round Table: Camelot ===
Fate/Grand Order - Divine Realm of the Round Table: Camelot (Note: Known in Japan as Feito/Gurando Ōdā: Divine Realm of the Round Table: Camelot (Japanese: フェイト/グランドオーダー -神聖円卓領域 キャメロット-, Hepburn: Feito/Gurando Ōdā Shinsei Entaku Ryōiki; lit. 'Fate/Grand Order - Divine Realm of the Round Table: Camelot')) is a two-part anime film adaptation produced by Production I.G and Signal.MD, adapting the 6th chapter of the game. Kei Suezawa directed the first part while Kazuto Arai directed the second. Ukyō Kodachi wrote the first films' scripts, and Keita Haga and Hideyuki Fukasawa composed the films' scores. The first part titled Fate/Grand Order - Divine Realm of the Round Table: Camelot - Wandering; Agateram was released in December 2020. While the second, Fate/Grand Order - Divine Realm of the Round Table: Camelot - Paladin; Agateram was released in March 2021.

=== Fate/Grand Order: Final Singularity-Grand Temple of Time: Solomon ===
Fate/Grand Order: Final Singularity-Grand Temple of Time: Solomon (Note: Japanese: フェイト/グランドオーダー -終局特異点 冠位時間神殿ソロモン-, Hepburn: Feito/Gurando Ōdā Shuukyoku Tokuiten - Kani Jikan Shinden Solomon) is a 2021 Japanese animated fantasy film based on the video game Fate/Grand Order. It was produced by CloverWorks, directed by Toshifumi Akai, and composed by Keita Haga and Ryo Kawasaki. The story follows Mash Kyrielight and Ritsuka/Fujimaru as they see a vision of a figure speaking about their feelings of the endless suffering of humanity, which they are subjected to due to their clairvoyance exposing them to all the horrors of the past and future. Fate/Grand Order: Final Singularity-Grand Temple of Time: Solomon was revealed as the eighth and final chapter of Observer at the Timeless Temple, which covered the events of the Solomon Singularity.

=== Fate/kaleid liner Prisma Illya: Licht - The Nameless Girl ===
Fate/kaleid liner Prisma Illya: Licht - The Nameless Girl (Note: Japanese: Fate/kaleid liner プリズマ☆イリヤ Licht 名前の無い少女, Hepburn: Fate/kaleid liner Prisma Illya Licht - Namae no Nai Shōjo) is a 2021 Japanese animated fantasy action film based on the manga Fate/kaleid liner Prisma Illya. It was produced by Silver Link and directed by Shin Oonuma. The film is a sequel to the 2017 film Fate/kaleid liner Prisma Illya: Vow in the Snow, and a continuation of the Fate/kaleid liner Prisma Illya anime series.

== Notes ==
Japanese titles and translations
