= List of Fate/kaleid liner Prisma Illya episodes =

Fate/kaleid liner Prisma Illya is a 2013 anime series by Silver Link based on the manga by Hiroshi Hiroyama, which is itself a spin-off of Type-Moon's visual novel, Fate/stay night. Set in an alternate universe to Fate/stay night and its prequel, Fate/Zero, the series follows Illyasviel von Einzbern, aka Illya, who reluctantly becomes a magical girl tasked with capturing magical cards scattered across the city. The anime aired on Tokyo MX between July 13 and September 14, 2013, and was simulcast by Crunchyroll. The anime is produced by Silver Link and directed by Miki Minato, Takashi Sakamoto and Shin Ōnuma, written by Kenji Inoue and Hazuki Minase with music by Tatsuya Katō. The opening theme song is "starlog" by Choucho and the ending theme song is "Prism Sympathy" by StylipS.

A second season, Fate/kaleid liner Prisma Illya 2wei!, aired between July 10 and September 11, 2014. The second season's opening theme is "moving soul" by Minami Kuribayashi and the ending theme is "Two By Two" by Yumeha Kouda. The first two seasons are licensed in North America by Sentai Filmworks. The third season, Fate/kaleid liner Prisma Illya 2wei Herz!, aired between July 25 and December 26, 2015. The third season's opening theme is "Wonder Stella" (ワンダーステラ) by Fhána while the ending themes are "Happening Diary" (ハプニング☆ダイアリー, Hapuningu Daiarī) for episodes 1-5 and "Wishing Diary" for episode's 6–10, both by Kouda.

A fourth season, Fate/kaleid liner Prisma Illya 3rei!, aired between July 3, 2016, and September 21, 2016. The opening theme is "Asterism" by Choucho while the ending themes are "Whimsical Wayward Wish" by Technoboys Pulcraft Green-Fund feat. Yumeha Kouda. The ending theme for episode nine is "Cuddle" by ChouCho.

== Series overview ==
Title	Premiere	Finale	Episodes
Season 1	July 13, 2013	September 14, 2013	10
2wei!	July 10, 2014	September 11, 2014	10
2wei! Herz!	July 25, 2015	September 26, 2015	10
3rei!!	July 6, 2016	September 21, 2016	12
Vow in the Snow	August 26, 2017	N/A	Film
Prisma Phantasm	June 14, 2019	N/A	OVA
Licht - The Nameless Girl	August 27, 2021	N/A	Film

== Episode list ==
=== Fate/kaleid liner Prisma Illya (2013) ===
No.	Title	Original air date
1	"Birth! A Magical Girl!"; Transliteration: "Tanjō! Mahō Shōjo!" (Japanese: 誕生！魔法少女！)	July 13, 2013
Illya has been chosen by the Kaleidostick Ruby to become the new magical girl.
2	"Who?"; Transliteration: "Dare?" (Japanese: 誰？)	July 20, 2013
A challenger appears, just when Illya is having trouble collecting the Rider card under Rin's instructions.
3	"Girl Meets Girl"; Transliteration: "Gāru Mītsu Gāru" (Japanese: ガール ミーツ ガール)	July 27, 2013
A mysterious transfer student, Miyu Edelfelt, has joined Illya's class. Is she friend or rival?
4	"We Lost"; Transliteration: "Makemashita" (Japanese: 負けました)	August 3, 2013
Illya and her friends have been defeated by Caster. They must figure out how to improve their teamwork in order to win the rematch.
5	"There are two options?" Transliteration: "Sentakushi wa futatsu…?" (Japanese: 選択肢は2つ…?)	August 10, 2013
There is no time to celebrate their hard-won victory, as Saber card suddenly appears to strike down Rin and Luvia. Faced with their strongest opponent yet, which option will Illya and Miyu choose?
6	"A Blank, and the End of Night…"; Transliteration: "Kūhaku yoru no owari" (Japanese: 空白 夜の終わり)	August 17, 2013
Illya calls upon the power of the Archer card to defeat Saber.
7	"Triumph and Escape"; Transliteration: "Shōri to Tōsō" (Japanese: 勝利と逃走)	August 24, 2013
Illya stays home to recover from a fever, but gets into some hijinks with Miyu. That night they attempt to capture the Assassin card.
8	"I'll Be a Normal Girl Again"; Transliteration: "Futsū no Onna no ko ni modorimasu" (Japanese: 普通の女の子に戻ります)	August 31, 2013
Suffering from shellshock, Illya tells Rin she wants to resign from being a magical girl. But fate has something different in store for her.
9	"I'll End This Right Here"; Transliteration: "Koko de Owaraseru" (Japanese: ここで終わらせる)	September 7, 2013
Miyu attempts to capture the last card by herself using Saber's power.
10	"Kaleidoscope" (Japanese: Kaleidoscope)	September 14, 2013
Illya and Miyu must combine their strength in order to defeat Berserker whose Noble Phantasm allows him instant resurrections.
11 (OVA)	"Dance at the Sports Festival!"; Transliteration: "Undōkai de Dansu!" (Japanese: 運動会 DE ダンス!)	March 10, 2014
Believing their teacher's chastity to be in danger, Illya and Miyu must try to learn to dance in order to win the sports festival for their class.

=== Fate/kaleid liner Prisma Illya 2wei! (2014) ===
No.	Title	Original air date
1	"Illya Grow Up!?"; Transliteration: "Iriya grow up!?" (Japanese: イリヤ grow up!?)	July 10, 2014
With the ley lines failing to recover despite the cards being retrieved, Rin and Luvia bring Illya and Miyu with them to help seal the lines. However, something goes wrong, leading Illya to become split into two separate people.
2	"Illya x Illya"; Transliteration: "Iriya Iriya" (Japanese: イリヤ x イリヤ)	July 17, 2014
Illya finds herself targeted by her dark clone, Kuro Illya, whose creation has resulted in Illya's power becoming weaker. Rin and the others attempt to lure Kuro into a trap, but her ability to read everyone's moves leaves them at a disadvantage. However, Illya manages to draw Kuro into a bog, allowing her to be captured.
3	"Normal Life Breaker"; Transliteration: "Nichijō Bureikā" (Japanese: 日常ブレイカー)	July 24, 2014
After failing to get any information from Kuro, Rin places a seal on her that would cause her pain if anything happens to Illya. When Kuro escapes, Illya has to take drastic measures to keep her from making moves on Shirou. The next day, Kuro causes more problems for Illya when she starts randomly kissing other girls at school to replenish mana. When the two are spotted together by her classmates, Kuro decides to pose as Illya's cousin.
4	"The Tempestuous Transfer Student"; Transliteration: "Arashi no Tenkōsei" (Japanese: 嵐の転校生)	July 31, 2014
Kuro transfers into Illya's class, much to Illya's dismay, and is immediately thrust into a dodgeball match against the classmates she kissed the other day. Feeling her school life is at risk, Illya steps in to challenge Kuro one-on-one, with both sides bringing out their full magical power. Kuro lands a critical hit on Illya's face, but due to their shared pain they both pass out, ending the match in a draw. Whilst recovering, Kuro suspects the school nurse knows more about her existence than she lets on. As Shirou comes to pick up Illya, Miyu is a little perturbed by Kuro's words that she shouldn't stay too close to Illya, lest she find out things she has been keeping secret.
5	"Well, In Other Words"; Transliteration: "Sore wa, Tsumari" (Japanese: それは, つまり)	August 7, 2014
After Illya inadvertently blows up her house's bathroom wall, her family comes over to Luvia's house to use her bathroom, where Kuro causes more trouble for Illya. Later, as Rin and Luvia ask Illya about how she used the Archer Card in the manner she did, Illya's statement of wanting to return to a normal life angers Kuro, who reveals she herself possesses the Archer Card and escapes. The next day, Miyu is summoned by Kuro, who claims Illya's wish of a normal life excludes Miyu and the other people she had met as well too. However, Miyu has faith in her friendship with Illya and uses the Saber Card to stand up against Kuro.
6	"On the Other Side of Lies and Façade"; Transliteration: "Uso to Tsuyogari no Mukōgawa" (Japanese: 嘘と強がりの向こう側)	August 14, 2014
Miyu and Kuro have an intense battle before Illya arrives to try and stop them, apologising for the words she said before. When Irisviel suddenly arrives to pick Illya up, Kuro tries to attack her, but she stops her with her own magic. Irisviel reveals Kuro was sealed away so that Illya can become the Holy Grail, with Kuro becoming upset when she learns the Holy Grail War no longer takes place, feeling she has no place to belong. She ends up overusing her mana and starts to disappear, but Illya gives her some of her own mana so that she can last longer. Told by Illya to make her own wish come true, Kuro wishes to have a family, allowing her to come back into existence as a proper member of Illya's family.
7	"Clash! Cooking Sisters"; Transliteration: "Gekitotsu! Kukkin Shisutāzu" (Japanese: 激突! クッキン·シスターズ)	August 21, 2014
Illya ends up competing in a baking contest against Kuro, winding up at a disadvantage due to one of her teammates adding bizarre ingredients. The next day, Illya tries to learn how to be regarded by Kuro as a "big sister", with not much success. Everyone also find out that Illya, Kuro and Miyu have the same birthday of July 20th. Later, Kuro states how she is relying on Illya to keep supplying her with mana.
8	"And Her Name Is..."; Transliteration: "Kanojo no Na wa" (Japanese: 彼女の名は)	August 28, 2014
Irisviel has Rin and Luvia sneak her into Illya's school to observe her during classes, later asking them to leave Illya and Kuro to their normal lives. Later that day, as Rin observes a change in the ley lines and Miyu is sent on an errand, a mysterious woman named Bazett Fraga McRemitz appears before Luvia, demanding she hand over the Class Cards. As Luvia and her butler, Auguste, battle against Bazett, Rin tries to find the opportunity to launch a sneak attack, but both their attacks fail, as Bazett prepares to make a move against Illya and Kuro.
9	"Lone Battle"; Transliteration: "Hitori no Tatakai" (Japanese: 独りの戦い)	September 4, 2014
Bazett, who was previously responsible for collecting the Class Cards, launches a fierce attack against Illya and Kuro in an attempt to take their cards, completely overwhelming them. Just as they are cornered, Miyu arrives and uses the power of the Rider card Illya managed to protect to fight back against Bazett.
10	"The Things Those Hands Protected Are..."; Transliteration: "Sono Te ga Mamotta Mono wa" (Japanese: その手が守ったものは)	September 11, 2014
Bazett uses her weapon, Fragarach, to counter Miyu's strongest move and take her card, soon setting her sights on Kuro. However, working together with Kuro and Ruby, Illya manages to activate a seal that Rin left behind, allegedly giving her the same curse as Kuro and leaving her unable to harm Illya. Rin also reveals the existence of an eighth card, convincing Bazett to form a truce and leave Illya with half of the cards. As the girls resume their everyday lives and look forward to their trip to the beach, the mysterious eighth card lies in slumber.
11 (OVA)	"Magical Girl in Hot Springs Inn"; Transliteration: "Mahō Shōjo in Onsen Ryokō" (Japanese: 魔法少女in温泉旅行)	July 25, 2015
Illya and co. go to a hot springs inn, where Rin and Luvia are carrying out a secret mission. During the trip, Kuro discovers that the hot springs cause a greater drain on her mana than usual, so Illya and Miyu make up for it by doing other fun activities with her. Later that night, the girls investigate a magic point, which creates a hidden hot spring and rectifies the properties of the hot springs in the region.

=== Fate/kaleid liner Prisma Illya 2wei Herz! (2015) ===
No.	Title	Original air date
1	"It's Like Looking in a Mirror, and I Don't Like It"; Transliteration: "Kagami ni Shiteru Mitai de Iya nandakedo" (Japanese: 鏡にしてるみたいでイヤなんだけど)	July 25, 2015
As Illya and her friends prepare for a trip to the beach, Mimi stumbles across Illya and Kuro doing their 'mana transfer'. Afterwards, Miyu comes over to Illya's house for a sleepover, where she acts bashful around Shirou.
2	"Tricolore Birthday"; Transliteration: "Torikorōru Bāsudē" (Japanese: トリコロール・バースデー)	August 1, 2015
Illya and her friends arrive at the beach alongside Shirou and his friend Issei Ryuudou. Whilst enjoying the beach, Miyu tells about how she has a brother, who Shirou resembles, before the girls come across Bazett, who is working part-time jobs to pay off her debts. Later, as everyone has a party to celebrate Illya, Miyu, and Kuro's birthdays, the celebrations are interrupted by some noisy construction from Rin and Luvia, who are attempting to dig for the eighth card, with Illya soon finding herself in the middle of an outrageous feud. Things become more troublesome when Ruby tries to inject Shirou with a love potion, though Sapphie soon sorts things out by erasing everyone's memories.
3	"Young Ladies, Life is Short, So Rot Away"; Transliteration: "Inochi Mijikashi Kusare yo Otome" (Japanese: 命短し腐れよ乙女)	August 8, 2015
Plagued by thoughts of lewdness surrounding Illya and Kuro, Mimi starts putting her thoughts down into story, which soon turns into a gender-swapped boy's love story. This soon catches the attention of her classmate Suzuka Kurihara and her sister, who decide to use her story for a yaoi doujin. Concerned about Mimi's gradual transformation into a fujoshi, Suzuka asks Illya, Miyu, and Kuro for their help. Despite not being fond of Mimi's fascination with BL, Illya learns that it doesn't mean they can't still be friends.
4	"Theme Park Panic!"; Transliteration: "Tēma Pāku Panikku!" (Japanese: てーまぱーく・ぱにっく！)	August 15, 2015
Illya receives tickets to a theme park from Luvia and decides to go with her friends. When they lose track of Irisviel, who gets swept into a special event, they come across Caren, who agrees to be their substitute guardian. Later, Illya discovers the charm on her bracelet has gone missing, so Miyu decides to help her search for it. Taking some advice from Caren, Miyu manages to deduce the charm's location and find it before closing time. Afterwards, Kuro becomes curious about the relationship between Irisviel and Caren.
5	"Yukatas and Fireworks"; Transliteration: "Yukata to Hanabi" (Japanese: 浴衣と花火)	August 22, 2015
The girls attend the local summer festival, where Illya shows Miyu how to enjoy herself. Later, Rin and Luvia get into mischief in front of Shiro, while Illya uses her transformation to escape a wardrobe malfunction. Meanwhile, Kuro becomes aware that Miyu is hiding some kind of secret from Illya.
6	"Blue Glass Moon" (Japanese: Blue glass moon)	August 29, 2015
Having completed reconstruction of her mansion, Luvia invites everyone over for a house party, after which the girls discuss their plan to obtain the eighth card. As the girls prepare for what could be their final mission, Kuro questions Irisviel over how the cards are related to the Holy Grail War, which involved only seven classes. Ruling out the possibility of Irisviel being involved, Kuro suggests that they question Miyu, but Illya feels it is best to focus on the task at hand and find the answer themselves.
7	"Enforcer"; Transliteration: "Shikkōsha" (Japanese: 執行者)	September 5, 2015
The girls are joined by Bazett, who reveals she had dispelled the curse of shared pain a while back, before entering the Mirror World, where they are confronted by the eighth card, shrouded by a black mist. Following their plan, Luvia restrains the enemy while Rin provides a mean to enhance Illya and Miyu's attack, providing an opening for Kuro to attack. However, the enemy manages to block it with a shield and counterattacks, forcing the girls to retreat while Bazett charges in, only to get stabbed by multiple swords wielded by the enemy. As Bazett fights using the Berserker's power, Illya and Kuro stay behind to give her a chance to strike, but are still unable to defeat it. Barely managing to escape, Bazett informs the others that the enemy possesses a second Archer card, before it suddenly appears in the real world.
8	"Observer"; Transliteration: "Kansatsusha" (Japanese: 観察者)	September 12, 2015
Luvia collapses the ceiling onto the enemy so that everyone can escape, but it transforms itself into a craft that starts heading towards the city. Just then, the girls are approached by Caren, revealed to be an observer for the Holy Church, who had placed a bound field around the city to keep anyone from seeing anything, giving the girls an opportunity to rest. As Caren theorises that the creature is targeting the Holy Grail, with Kuro deducing it relates to a different Holy Grail War entirely, the enemy starts heading towards Mt. Enzou, where it uncovers a magic circle. While trying to push them out of it, Illya pushes out a human boy that was inside it.
9	"Golden Boy"; Transliteration: "Kin'iro no Shōnen" (Japanese: 金色の少年)	September 19, 2015
As Caren experiences backflash from her observation spell, the boy, revealed to be the Heroic Spirit of the eighth card, reveals that Miyu is a princess from a parallel world who was born as a complete version of the Holy Grail. Feeling she can't escape her fate, Miyu gives Sapphire to Illya before being pulled into the vortex, completing the Heroic Spirit's ultimate form. Learning that Miyu is still alive inside the demon's body, Kuro and Bazett hold off the demon while Illya, gathering her resolve to rescue her friend, combines Ruby and Sapphire's power to unleash a powerful new transformation.
10	"Calling Your Name From a Corner of the World"; Transliteration: "Sekai no Katasumi de Kimi no Na wo" (Japanese: 世界の片隅で君の名を)	September 26, 2015
Using her new power, which puts her own body at risk, Illya fights back against the demon while Kuro and the others provide support. As the demon brings out his strongest sword, Ea, Illya uses her full power to defeat it and finally rescue Miyu. Following the battle, Illya and her friends get together to finish their summer homework, with Miyu more than happy to help. Meanwhile, Irisviel and Caren discover the crater has disappeared into a parallel world, where the eighth card is recovered by a mysterious pair.

=== Fate/kaleid liner Prisma Illya 3rei! (2016) ===
No.	Title	Original air date
1	"City Fading to Silver"; Transliteration: "Gin'iro ni Shizumu Machi" (Japanese: 銀色に沈む街)	July 6, 2016
The girls learn that the crater created in the mountain during their previous battle has mysteriously disappeared. While investigating the scene, they are suddenly confronted by two new adversaries who overwhelm them and kidnap Miyu. As Illya tries to chase after her, she finds herself in parallel world covered in snow, where she meets a peculiar girl known only as Tanaka. Despite seemingly having no other memories, Tanaka is somehow able to tell Illya that Miyu has been kidnapped by the Ainsworth Family.
2	"Encounters and Reunions"; Transliteration: "Kaigō to Saikai" (Japanese: 邂逅と再会)	July 13, 2016
Illya and Tanaka are attacked by one of Miyu's kidnappers, Beatrice Flowerchild, before she is suddenly called away. As Tanaka explains that the only thing she remembers is her duty to eliminate the Ainsworth family, she and Illya come across a ramen shop, where the owner explains that a gas explosion caused the crater. When they are suddenly faced with a hefty bill, they are bailed out by the Heroic Spirit Illya previously faced, Gilgamesh, who helps lead them to the Ainsworth's castle in the center of the crater. Making their way inside the castle, they come across a prison cell containing Miyu's older brother, who urges them to save Miyu. Just then, they are confronted by the other of Miyu's kidnappers, Angelica.
3	"Your True Enemy"; Transliteration: "Kimi no Hontō no Teki" (Japanese: 君の本当の敵)	July 20, 2016
Gilgamesh steps up to face against Angelica while Illya and Tanaka go off in search for Miyu, only to come up against Beatrice again. As Tanaka takes on brutal attacks from Beatrice, Illya manages to find Ruby among a pile of weapons, transforming once again and installing the Caster card to fight against Beatrice's Berserker. After Tanaka takes on a full blast from Beatrice, still managing to survive, Gilgamesh helps her and Illya make a retreat. Just as Beatrice and Angelica catch up to them, they are called off by the head of the Ainsworth family, Darius Ainsworth, while Kuro and Bazett also arrive in the parallel world.
4	"For My Weakling Little Sister"; Transliteration: "Yowamushi no Imōto e" (Japanese: 弱虫の妹へ)	July 27, 2016
Kuro brings Illya and the others to the school, which she and Bazett had been using as a base. Kuro then explains their situation while Bazett gives Illya the Saber, Rider, and Lancer cards. As Gilgamesh explains to Bazett what the cards are, Kuro, notices Illya feeling sorry for herself, confronts her in a battle, forcing her to use the cards she received from Bazett to defend herself. During the battle, Kuro informs Illya that her fears of being in an unknown world are the same feelings Miyu kept to herself all the while. Winning the battle with the Saber card, Illya comes to understand what Kuro was teaching her.
5	"A Little Lady Attacks"; Transliteration: "Ritoru Redi, Shūrai" (Japanese: リトルレディ、襲来)	August 3, 2016
Illya helps out a girl named Erica after she gets stuck on the school's walls and wets herself. As the girls take a bath together, they learn that Tanaka had lost her memories just before meeting Illya. Afterwards, as Sapphire manages to get in contact with Ruby, Erica is picked up by her father, who turns out to be Darius himself.
6	"Chilling Hostility"; Transliteration: "Itetsuku Tekii" (Japanese: 凍てつく敵意)	August 10, 2016
Darius traps Illya inside an ice barrier Noble Phantasm which slowly cuts off her oxygen supply. Tanaka manages to break through the barrier, allowing the others to come to Illya's aid, but they are all helpless to fight against Darius. After taking an interest in Tanaka's abilities, Darius takes his leave, with Erica leaving some disturbing words for Illya. As Illya and the others try to figure out their next move, Darius performs a painful ritual with Miyu. The next day, Kuro discovers that Illya has disappeared, leaving her Class Cards behind.
7	"Dolls and Stuffed Toys"; Transliteration: "Ningyō to Nuigurumi" (Japanese: 人形とぬいぐるみ)	August 17, 2016
Illya wakes up to find she has been kidnapped by the Ainsworths who, after failing to brainwash her, transferred her mind into a stuffed animal, placing a fake personality in her original body. Managing to take control of her new plushy body, Illya tries to chase after her original body but is caught by Beatrice, who brings her to her room. Before Beatrice can rip her to shreds, Illya is saved by the arrival of Rin and Luvia, only to discover they have also been brainwashed into becoming maids. Escaping to the loft, Illya manages to find Sapphire, who gives her the power to transform.
8	"People and Tools"; Transliteration: "Hito to Dōgu" (Japanese: 人と道具)	August 24, 2016
Learning that injuring the possessed bodies will bring their original minds back, Illya, still powerless despite transforming, tries to fight against the possessed Rin and Luvia, who utilise nameless Noble Phantasms to fight against her. As they end up crashing into Erica's room, where Angelica finds them, Illya manages to use split-second timing to return to her original body. As Angelica uses displacement magic to overwhelm Illya, she reveals that the Ainsworths are trying to save their world, which is slowly dying, by using Miyu as the Holy Grail.
9	"Illya's Choice"; Transliteration: "Iriya no Sentaku" (Japanese: イリヤの選択)	August 31, 2016
Angelica further explains the situation that because the world's decreasing mana is killing off lifeforms, the Ainsworths intend to use the Holy Grail to change humanity into a species that can survive in this new environment. Forced to use the Assassin Card to escape, Illya, conflicted over choosing between Miyu and humanity, is rescued by Kuro, who states her determination to save Miyu regardless of the situation. As Darius forces Miyu to watch everyone's battle, Illya comes to her own decision, stating her determination to save both Miyu and the world without sacrificing either.
10	"To The Princess's Side"; Transliteration: "Hime no Moto e" (Japanese: 姫の元へ)	September 7, 2016
As Gilgamesh and Bazett sneak up from behind, managing to bring Rin and Luvia back to their original bodies, Illya pushes ahead to confront Darius, using a card she received from Kuro to hit him with a dagger planned to cut off his magic, reuniting with Miyu in the process. However, emerging from Darius' body is his son, Julian, who reveals a large black cube in the sky and uses its dark power to consume Erica and create an army of Heroic Spirits. Just as the army seemingly overwhelms them, they are saved by the arrival of Miyu's brother, who bears a strong resemblance to Shirou.
11	"You Are Not Alone"; Transliteration: "Hitori ja nai" (Japanese: 独りじゃない)	September 14, 2016
Putting his own body at risk to use his Trace On ability to create weapons, Miyu's brother is aided by Kuro as he battles Angelica while the others fight off the Heroic Spirits. After Kuro manages to use teleportation to defeat Angelica, Miyu's brother goes after Julian but is heavily injured by a mysterious and deranged woman. As Miyu uses the Archer card to confront her, she becomes possessed by it until Gilgamesh retrieves it from her body. As Julian dispels the woman, Illya brings out her full power in an all-out attack.
12	"Connected Miracles"; Transliteration: "Tsunaida Kiseki" (Japanese: 繋いだ奇跡)	September 21, 2016
As Illya's attack fails to stop the regenerating army, Tanaka throws a mysterious sword into the middle of the fray, allowing Illya to damage the black cube and dispel the muck causing the army to grow. As Julian escapes with Erica and Beatrice, Bazett manages to retrieve a gem allowing Rin to properly heal Miyu's brother. After everyone, including Angelica, returns to Miyu's home, Illya and Kuro discover the sword she used was actually Tanaka's arm. While Julian prepares his vengeance, Miyu and her brother tell the others about what happened to them. (Final Episode - Story will be continued in forthcoming movie)
