= Fate/kaleid liner Prisma Illya: Prisma Phantasm =

Japanese comedy anime OVA

- Key visual of the OVA.
- Fate/kaleid liner プリズマ☆イリヤ プリズマ☆ファンタズム
- Directed by: Shin Oonuma
- Written by: Hazuki Minase; Kenji Inoue
- Starring: Mai Kadowaki; Kaori Nazuka; Chiwa Saitō
- Music by: Lantis
- Production company: Silver Link
- Distributed by: Kadokawa Animation (Japan); Sentai Filmworks (United States)
- Release date: 14 June 2019
- Running time: 62 minutes
- Country: Japan
- Language: Japanese

Fate/kaleid liner Prisma Illya: Prisma Phantasm is a 2019 comedy anime OVA based on Hiroshi Hiroyama and Type-Moon's anime and manga series Fate/kaleid liner Prisma Illya. The OVA takes characters from the Fate/kaleid liner Prisma Illya series and puts them in comedic and absurd situations. It is similar in its premise to the earlier Type-Moon OVA series Carnival Phantasm.

== Voice cast ==
Character	Voice actor
Illyasviel von Einzbern	Mai Kadowaki
Miyu Edelfelt	Kaori Nazuka
Chloe von Einzbern	Chiwa Saitō

== Production ==
In December 2018, it was announced that a new Prisma Illya OVA episode was in production. On February 28, 2019, it was announced on the official Prisma Illya website that the title of the new OVA would be Fate/kaleid liner Prisma Illya: Prisma Phantasm. It was also announced that Shin Oonuma would be returning as director, that Hazuki Minase and Kenji Inou would be returning as scriptwriters, that Kazuya Hirata would be returning as character designer, and that studio Lantis would be returning for music production. It was further announced that the new OVA would have theatrical screenings in Japan, but a release date was not announced. A preview released on in March 2019 revealed that the release date for the theatrical release would be June 14.

== Marketing ==
From May 17 to June 23, 2019, a blood donation drive was held at the akiba:F Blood Donation Room in Tokyo, Japan to promote the release of the OVA. Participants were given a sticker with characters from the OVA.

== Release ==
Fate/kaleid liner Prisma Illya: Prisma Phantasm received a limited theatrical release in Japan. It premiered on June 14, 2019, and was shown in 25 theaters. It ranked #1 on Japan's mini theater ranking during the week it released. It fell to #2 in the mini-theater rankings during the second week of its theatrical run. Theatergoers were given cards that featured artwork by the manga's creator Hiroshi Hiroyama, the anime series' character designer Kazuya Hirata, and the OVA's artist Eri Takenashi. It was also released in theaters in Taiwan on October 17, 2019.

Fate/kaleid liner Prisma Illya: Prisma Phantasm received as special screening as part of a double feature with Fate/kaleid liner Prisma Illya: Vow in the Snow at the EJ Anime Theater in Shinjuku, Japan from June 19 to July 2 in 2020.

The OVA was released on DVD and Blu-ray in Japan on November 27, 2019. The limited edition of the Blu-ray and DVD set included a Drama CD, as well as extra illustrations by Hiroshi Hiroyama and Kazuya Hirata. The OVA was also released on Blu-ray by Sentai Filmworks in North America on July 14, 2020.
