= Hinako (anime character) =

- Hinako character
- Hinako, as seen in her first appearance in Issho ni Training: Training with Hinako.
- First appearance: Issho ni Training: Training with Hinako (2009)
- Last appearance: Issho ni Training 026: Bathtime with Hinako & Hiyoko (2010)
- Designed by: Ryoko Amisaki

In-universe information
- Gender: Female

Hinako is a fictional character appearing in the three OVA anime:

1. April 2009: Issho ni Training: Training with Hinako
2. February 2010: Issho ni Sleeping: Sleeping with Hinako
3. December 2010: Issho ni Training 026: Bathtime with Hinako & Hiyoko.

In Japanese, the character is voiced by Mai Kadowaki. All three OVAs were produced at Studio Hibari, with character designs from Ryoko Amisaki and the screenplay written by Muneshige Nakagawa. In the first OVA, Training with Hinako, Hinako is transformed into an anime figure through a television and then talks to the viewer. After that, she begins to exercise to lose some weight, providing the viewer with fan service in the process. The video is in an interactive format, allowing the viewer to rearrange the scenes in the video. The intention behind the production of the first DVD was to make an animation that could be participated in. This DVD became a bestseller on Amazon in Japan in April 2009. The second OVA, Issho ni Sleeping: Sleeping with Hinako, shows Hinako going to bed and sleeping, while again addressing the viewer directly at the beginning. This second OVA has been panned for sometimes distracting from its main premise of showing the character sleep. Home video releases of the OVAs include releases in Japan, the United States, Germany, France and Italy. Android Apps have been released for Training with Hinako in 2010 and Sleeping with Hinako in 2011. A pirated version of the Training with Hinako app contained a smartphone virus, the first such virus found in Japan. Hinako's effect on the viewer has been described as legitimizing their existence in the fictional setting by recognizing the existence of the viewer and thereby letting them identify with the character. Merchandise released for the character includes an anime figure by Good Smile Company, a bathing mitten as well as an artbook and a guidebook for Android mobile devices.

== See also ==
- How Heavy Are the Dumbbells You Lift?, a 2016 manga / 2019 anime also focusing on fitness, like the first OVA did
