= Hanaori-san Still Wants to Fight in the Next Life =

Japanese manga series

- First tankōbon volume cover, featuring Meteor Hanaori

花織さんは転生しても喧嘩がしたい (Hanaori-san wa Tensei Shite mo Kenka ga Shitai)
- Genre: Reverse isekai; Romantic comedy
- Manga
- Written by: Hekiru Hikawa
- Published by: Kodansha
- English publisher: NA: Seven Seas Entertainment
- Imprint: Morning KC
- Magazine: Morning Two
- Original run: August 23, 2021 – present
- Volumes: 10
- Anime television series
- Directed by: Hideyo Yamamoto
- Written by: Yukie Sugawara
- Music by: Yukari Hashimoto; R.O.N
- Studio: Liden Films
- Licensed by: Crunchyroll: SEA: Plus Media Networks Asia
- Original network: ANN (ABC TV, TV Asahi), BS NTV, AT-X
- Original run: July 12, 2026 – September 26, 2026
- Episodes: 12
- icon

Hanaori-san Still Wants to Fight in the Next Life (Japanese: 花織さんは転生しても喧嘩がしたい, Hepburn: Hanaori-san wa Tensei Shite mo Kenka ga Shitai; lit. 'Even Reincarnated, Hanaori's Still Spoiling for a Fight') is a Japanese manga series written and illustrated by Hekiru Hikawa. It began serialization in Kodansha's seinen manga magazine Monthly Morning Two in August 2021. An anime television series adaptation produced by Liden Films aired from July to September 2026.

== Plot ==
The series follows Ryūsei Narukami, a NEET who lives alone and plays video games. He is actually the reincarnation of a demon lord from another world. One day, a high school girl named Meteor Hanaori shows up in his apartment, who turns out to be the reincarnation of the hero that defeated him during his life as a demon lord. Things get complicated when Ryūsei gets a job as a teacher in Meteor's high school.

== Characters ==
Ryūsei Narukami (鳴神 流星, Narukami Ryūsei)
Voiced by: Jun Fukuyama (Japanese); Mauricio Ortiz-Segura (English)
A NEET and the reincarnation of the Demon Lord. He gets a job as a teacher at Meteor's high school. Despite their pasts, the two develop a relationship.
Meteor Hanaori (花織 ミーティア, Hanaori Mītia)
Voiced by: Akira Sekine (Japanese); Kelly Greenshield (English)
A popular high school student and the reincarnation of the Hero that defeated the Demon Lord. She develops a relationship with Ryūsei.
Mako Satsuki (皐月まこ, Satsuki Mako)
Voiced by: Seena Hoshiki (Japanese); Rebecca Danae (English)
Matsurika Nagamori (永守茉莉花, Nagamori Matsurika)
Voiced by: Hitomi Ueda (Japanese); Erin Nicole Lundquist (English)
Mana Kuraishi (倉石摩那, Kuraishi Mana)
Voiced by: Sora Tokui (Japanese); Victoria Vitti (English)
Minto Takigawa (多岐川眠兎, Takigawa Minto)
Voiced by: Nene Hieda (Japanese); Lara Woodhull (English)
Ayahime Takanashi (小鳥遊綾姫, Takanashi Ayahime)
Voiced by: Rie Takahashi
Eriko Asahina (朝比奈絵理子, Asahina Eriko)
Voiced by: Hiromi Igarashi
Moe Narukami (鳴神萌, Narukami Moe)
Voiced by: Ayasa Itō (Japanese); Emi Lo (English)
Sakura Rokudo (六道さくら, Rokudo Sakura)
Voiced by: Yoko Hikasa (Japanese); Lexa Childress (English)
Meru Tsumugina (紬奈愛琉, Tsumugina Meru)
Voiced by: Maaya Uchida

== Media ==
=== Manga ===
Written and illustrated by Hekiru Hikawa, Hanaori-san Still Wants to Fight in the Next Life began serialization in Kodansha's seinen manga magazine Monthly Morning Two on August 23, 2021, with the first tankōbon volume released on February 22, 2022. Ten volumes have been released as of July 2026.

In December 2025, Seven Seas Entertainment announced that they had licensed the series for English publication in an 2-in-1 omnibus format, with the first omnibus set to be released in October 2026.

| No. | Original release date | Original ISBN | English release date | English ISBN |
|---|---|---|---|---|
| 1 | February 22, 2022 | 978-4-06-526749-3 | October 27, 2026 | 979-8-89863-470-4 |
| 2 | August 23, 2022 | 978-4-06-528633-3 | October 27, 2026 | 979-8-89863-470-4 |
| 3 | February 21, 2023 | 978-4-06-530669-7 | February 23, 2027 | 979-8-89863-471-1 |
| 4 | August 23, 2023 | 978-4-06-532559-9 | February 23, 2027 | 979-8-89863-471-1 |
| 5 | March 22, 2024 | 978-4-06-534916-8 | — | — |
| 6 | September 20, 2024 | 978-4-06-536728-5 | — | — |
| 7 | March 21, 2025 | 978-4-06-538613-2 | — | — |
| 8 | September 22, 2025 | 978-4-06-540615-1 | — | — |
| 9 | March 23, 2026 | 978-4-06-542863-4 | — | — |
| 10 | July 22, 2026 | 978-4-06-544262-3 | — | — |

=== Anime ===
An anime television series adaptation was announced on September 21, 2025. It is produced by Liden Films and directed by Hideyo Yamamoto, with series composition handled by Yukie Sugawara, characters designed by Yousuke Okuda, and music composed by Yukari Hashimoto and R.O.N. The series aired from July 12 to September 26, 2026, on the Animazing!!! programming block on all ANN affiliates, including ABC Television and TV Asahi. (Note: ABC and TV Asahi listed the series premiere on July 11 at 26:00, which is effectively July 12 at 2:00 a.m. JST.) The opening theme song is "High Maintenance Girl" (ハイメンテナンスガール, Hai Mentenansu Gāru), performed by Masayoshi Oishi, while the ending theme song is "Very Good Encounter" (ベリーグッド・エンカウント, Berīguddo・Enkaunto), performed by Maaya Uchida. Crunchyroll is streaming the series. Plus Media Networks Asia licensed the series in Southeast Asia for broadcast on Aniplus Asia.

==== Episodes ====
| No. | Title (Note: Each episode is named after a film title.) | Directed by | Storyboarded by | Original release date |
|---|---|---|---|---|
| 1 | "When Ryusei Met Meteor"; Transliteration: "Koibito Tachi no Yokan" (Japanese: 恋人たちの予感) | Yasuto Nishikata | Hideyo Yamamoto | July 12, 2026 |
| 2 | "The Witches of Oz"; Transliteration: "Ozu no Mahōtsukai" (Japanese: オズの魔法使い) | Kenji Matsuoka | Hideyo Yamamoto | July 19, 2026 |
| 3 | "Midnight Run"; Transliteration: "Middonaito Ran" (Japanese: ミッドナイトラン) | Naoki Yamamoto | Hideyo Yamamoto | July 26, 2026 (Note: This episode aired at 2:20 a.m. JST, 20 minutes after the regular air time on ABC Television.) |
| 4 | "Unforgiven"; Transliteration: "Yurusarezaru Mono" (Japanese: 許されざる者) | Kim Sulim | Hideyo Yamamoto | August 2, 2026 |
| 5 | "Much Ado About Nothing"; Transliteration: "Karasawagi" (Japanese: から騒ぎ) | Akio Uchino | Hideyo Yamamoto | August 9, 2026 (Note: This episode aired at 2:30 a.m. JST, 30 minutes after the regular air time on ABC Television.) |
| 6 | "Pulp Fiction"; Transliteration: "Parupu・Fikushon" (Japanese: パルプ・フィクション) | Rei Nakahara | Hideyo Yamamoto | August 16, 2026 |
| 7 | "Seven"; Transliteration: "Sebun" (Japanese: セブン) | Hideyo Yamamoto | Hideyo Yamamoto | August 23, 2026 |
| 8 | "Training Day"; Transliteration: "Torēningu Dei" (Japanese: トレーニング デイ) | Mimi Amasawa | Hideyo Yamamoto | August 30, 2026 |
| 9 | "Scream"; Transliteration: "Sukurīmu" (Japanese: スクリーム) | Itogashi Shintaro | Toshimitsu Kobayashi | September 5, 2026 |
| 10 | "Triangle of Sadness"; Transliteration: "Gyakuten no Torainguru" (Japanese: 逆転のトライアングル) | Tomoko Hiramuki | Hideyo Yamamoto | September 12, 2026 |
| 11 | "Romeo and Juliet"; Transliteration: "Romio to Jurietto" (Japanese: ロミオとジュリエット) | Hideyo Yamamoto | Hideyo Yamamoto | September 19, 2026 |
| 12 | "Love Actually"; Transliteration: "Rabu・Akuchuarī" (Japanese: ラブ・アクチュアリー) | Kim Sulim | Hideyo Yamamoto | September 26, 2026 |
