= Hekiru Hikawa =

Japanese manga artist (born 1975)

Hekiru Hikawa (氷川へきる, Hikawa Hekiru; born January 31, 1975 in Tokyo) is a Japanese manga artist, best known for creating Pani Poni. Pani Poni was adapted into an anime television series and spun off into two manga series, Maro-Mayu and The Alternative Cure Magical Girl Behoimi-chan. However Hikawa ended the series in 2011 to work on other projects. Hikawa is currently working on his new manga series, Candy Pop Nightmare and Hanaori-san Still Wants to Fight in the Next Life.
