= Chiwa Saitō =

Japanese voice actress (born 1981)

- 斎藤 千和
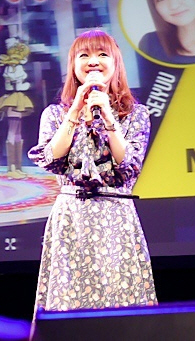
- Chiwa Saito at the Anime Festival Asia 2011 Stage Events in Singapore
- Born: March 12, 1981 (age 45); Saitama Prefecture, Japan
- Other names: Chiwa-chan; ChiwaChiwa
- Occupation: Voice actress
- Years active: 1999–present
- Employer: I'm Enterprise
- Notable work: Monogatari as Hitagi Senjougahara; Puella Magi Madoka Magica as Homura Akemi; Yona of the Dawn as Yona; Fate/kaleid liner Prisma Illya as KURO von Eizenbern; Aria as Aika S. Granzchesta; Genshin Impact as Jean; Honkai: Star Rail as Castorice
- Height: 155 cm (5 ft 1 in)
- Children: 3

Chiwa Saitō (斎藤 千和, Saitō Chiwa; born March 12, 1981) is a Japanese voice actress represented by I'm Enterprise. She is best known for her anime roles, which include Hitagi Senjougahara in Monogatari, Homura Akemi in Puella Magi Madoka Magica, Yona in Akatsuki no Yona, Chloe von Eizenbern in Fate/kaleid liner Prisma Illya, Caster (Tamamo-no-Mae and her variants) in Fate/Extra & Fate/Grand Order series, Aika S. Granzchesta in Aria, Jean in Genshin Impact, Castorice in Honkai: Star Rail, and Aoi Asahina in the Danganronpa video games and anime.

== Personal life ==
Chiwa announced on July 29, 2013, that she had gotten married, and announced in October 2015 that she had given birth to her first child, a daughter. On January 17, 2024, she announced that she was the mother of two additional children.

== Filmography ==
=== TV Series ===
1999

- Orphen: The Revenge, Remi (ep. 1)

2001

- Kokoro Library, Kokoro

2002

- Panyo Panyo Di Gi Charat, Mermaid Princess

2003

- R.O.D -The TV-, Anita King
- Inuyasha, Village Maiden 2 (ep. 129)
- Kino's Journey, Daughter (ep. 3)
- Popotan, Magical Girl Lilo-chan (ep. 3)
- Bobobo-bo Bo-bobo, Usa-chan the Rabbit
- Mermaid Melody: Pichi Pichi Pitch, Female Student A (ep. 37), Girl A (ep. 22)
- Wandaba Style, Ayame Akimo
- Last Exile, Lavie Head

2004

- Uta∽Kata, Yuka (ep. 4)
- Gakuen Alice, Sumire Shoda & Yoichi "Yo-chan" Hijiri
- Sgt. Frog, Natsumi Hinata
- Samurai 7, Komachi Mikumari
- Desert Punk, Kosuna
- Tsukuyomi: Moon Phase, Hazuki/Luna
- DearS, Neneko Izumi
- Ninja Nonsense, Midori (ep. 2)
- Maria Watches Over Us, Mami Yamaguchi
- Maria Watches Over Us Season 2: Printemps, Mami Yamaguchi
- Midori Days, Seiji Sawamura (young)

2005

- Aria the Animation, Aika S. Granzchesta, Asuna (ep. 12)
- The Law of Ueki, Tenko (small)
- Gaiking, Telmina
- Kamichu!, Tama
- GUNxSWORD, Melissa
- Ginban Kaleidoscope, Yohko Sakurano
- Best Student Council, Kaori Izumi
- Blood+, Lulu
- Hell Girl, Haruka Yasuda (ep. 6)
- Zettai Shonen, Miku Miyama
- Pani Poni Dash!, Rebecca "Becky" Miyamoto
- PetoPeto-san, Chie Oohashi
- One Piece, Chimney

2006

- Aria The Natural, Aika S. Granzchesta
- Fairy Musketeers, Cane
- Canvas 2: Niji Iro no Sketch, Girl (ep. 22)
- Kirarin Revolution, Aoi Kirisawa
- Gintama, Kuriko Matsudaira
- Ballad of a Shinigami, Mai Makihara
- Strawberry Panic!, Chiyo Tsukidate
- 009-1, Freya (ep. 4)
- Chocotto Sister, Eriko Odawara
- Demashitaa! Powerpuff Girls Z, Kuriko Akatsutsumi
- Tokimeki Memorial ~Only Love~, Store Girl
- Negima!?, Anya, Motsu
- Nishi no Yoki Majo Astraea Testament, Adel Roland
- Pumpkin Scissors, Septieme Rodelia (ep. 13)
- Disgaea, Jennifer
- Yoshinaga-san'chi no Gargoyle, Futaba Yoshinaga
- Wan Wan Serebu Soreyuke! Tetsunoshin, Meg

2007

- Mobile Suit Gundam 00, Louise Halevy
- Shining Tears X Wind, Houmei
- Zombie-Loan, Yuuta
- Baccano!, Carol
- Hitohira, Minoru Yamaguchi, Student Council President
- Magical Girl Lyrical Nanoha StrikerS, Subaru Nakajima
- Mokke, Kazama
- Romeo × Juliet, Regan

2008

- Aria the Origination, Aika S. Granzchesta
- Allison & Lillia, Merielle
- Kaiba, Chronico
- Kanokon, Akane Asahina
- Mobile Suit Gundam 00 Second Season, Louise Halevy
- Linebarrels of Iron, Rachel Calvin
- Gegege no Kitarō, Kumi (ep. 67)
- Kemeko Deluxe!, Kemeko
- Zoku Sayonara Zetsubō Sensei, Meru Otonashi (ep. 6)
- Strike Witches, Francesca Lucchini
- Soul Eater, Kim Diehl
- The Tower of Druaga: The Aegis of Uruk, Mite (ep. 12)
- Bamboo Blade, Shinobu Toyama (ep. 26)
- Hidamari Sketch × 365, Chocolat (ep. 8)
- Pocket Monsters: Diamond & Pearl, Taisei (ep. 80)
- xxxHOLiC: Kei, Female Student A (ep. 10)
- Rosario + Vampire Capu2, Kokoa Shuzen

2009

- Kobato, Kohaku
- Sasameki Koto, Miyako Taema
- 07-Ghost, Kuroyuri
- Tegami Bachi: Letter Bee, Sonja (ep. 12)
- The Tower of Druaga: the Sword of Uruk, Mite the Fool
- Bakemonogatari, Hitagi Senjougahara
- Maria Watches Over Us 4th Season, Mami Yamaguchi
- One Piece, Boa Sandersonia

2010

- Arakawa Under the Bridge, Stella
- Arakawa Under the Bridge × Bridge, Stella
- Ikki Tousen: Xtreme Xecutor, Shikou Soujin
- Star Driver, Mami Yano
- Strike Witches 2, Francesca Lucchini
- Dance in the Vampire Bund, Yuki Saegusa
- Hanamaru Kindergarten, Mayumi
- Pocket Monsters: Diamond & Pearl, Nobuko
- Mitsudomoe, Miku Sugisaki

2011

- Astarotte's Toy, Ingrid "Ini" Sorveig Sorgríms
- Mobile Suit Gundam AGE, Riria (eps 6-8)
- Horizon in the Middle of Nowhere, Kimi Aoi
- Gintama', Kuriko Matsudaira
- C3, Sovereignty
- Tamayura – Hitotose, Shimako Tobita (eps 7-9)
- Phi-Brain – Puzzle of God, Maze, Kaito Daimon (young)
- Puella Magi Madoka Magica, Homura Akemi
- Mitsudomoe Zōryōchū!, Miku Sugisaki
- Last Exile: Fam, The Silver Wing, Teddy
- Saki: Achiga-hen episode of Side-A – Awai Oohoshi

2012

- Horizon in the Middle of Nowhere II, Kimi Aoi
- Kuroko's Basketball, Riko Aida
- Gon, Ani
- Shining Hearts, Xiao Mei
- Jewelpet Kira Deco—!, Eclan
- Sword Art Online, Alicia Rue
- Daily Lives of High School Boys, Ikushima
- Natsuiro Kiseki, Ishida
- Nisemonogatari, Hitagi Senjōgahara
- YuruYuri, Nadeshiko Ōmuro
- Last Exile: Fam, The Silver Wing, Anand (eps 12-13), Emma (ep. 18), Lavie Head (eps 15.5-21), Luscinia (15 years old; ep. 11)

2013

- Dog & Scissors, Sara Moribe
- Infinite Stratos 2, Tatenashi Sarashiki
- Gundam Build Fighters, Caroline Yajima
- Kyousogiga, Doctor Shōko & Yakushimaru
- Silver Spoon, Tamako's Mother (ep. 7)
- Sasami-san@Ganbaranai, Tsurugi Yagami
- Stella Women's Academy, High School Division Class C3, Honoka Mutsu
- Tamagotchi! Miracle Friends, Clulutchi
- Danganronpa: The Animation, Aoi Asahina
- Namiuchigiwa no Muromi-san, Yeti
- Photo Kano, Nonoka Masaki
- Blood Lad, Mamejirō
- BlazBlue Alter Memory, Taokaka
- Maoyū Maō Yūsha, Head Maid
- Monogatari Series Second Season, Hitagi Senjōgahara
- Problem Children Are Coming from Another World, Aren't They?, Pest
- One Piece Episode of Merry: Mō Hitori no Nakama no Monogatari, Chimney

2014

- Yona of the Dawn, Yona
- Gugure! Kokkuri-san, Inugami (Female)
- keroro, Natsumi Hinata
- Seitokai Yakuindomo*, Uomi
- World Conquest Zvezda Plot, Natasha's Mother (ep. 4)
- Soul Eater Not!, Kim Diehl
- Tsukimonogatari, Hitagi Senjōgahara
- D-Frag!, Chitose Karasuyama
- No-Rin, Natsumi "Becky" Bekki
- Nobunagun, Geronimo
- Chaika – The Coffin Princess, Frederica
- Chaika – The Coffin Princess Avenging Battle, Frederica
- Fate/kaleid liner Prisma Illya 2wei!, Chloe Von Einzbern
- Broken Blade, Sigyn Erster
- The Irregular at Magic High School, Maya Yotsuba
- Log Horizon, Nureha

2015

- Tantei Kageki Milky Holmes TD, Setsuko Yasubashi (ep. 4)
- Fate/kaleid liner Prisma Illya 2wei Herz!, Chloe Von Einzbern
- Magical Girl Lyrical Nanoha ViVid, Nove Nakajima
- Snow White with the Red Hair, Kihal Toghrul
- Aria the Scarlet Ammo AA, Tō Sumitsu
- Owarimonogatari, Hitagi Senjōgahara
- YuruYuri San Hai!, Nadeshiko Ōmuro

2016

- Rewrite, Kotori Kanbe
- Fate/kaleid liner Prisma Illya 3rei!!, Chloe von Einzbern
- Danganronpa 3: The End of Kibōgamine Gakuen, Aoi Asahina
- The Great Passage, Remi Miyoshi
- Vivid Strike!, Nove Nakajima

2017

- Berserk, Schierke
- Land of the Lustrous, Ventricosus
- Owarimonogatari 2nd Season, Hitagi Senjougahara

2018

- Lord of Vermilion: The Crimson King, Chiyu
- Zoku Owarimonogatari, Hitagi Senjougahara
- One Piece, Charlotte Flampe

2019

- Bermuda Triangle: Colorful Pastral, Léger
- Strike Witches 501st Unit, Taking Off!, Francesca Lucchini

2020

- I'm Standing on a Million Lives, Kahabell

2021

- Kaginado, Kotori Kanbe
- Demon Slayer: Kimetsu no Yaiba, Koinatsu

2023

- Handyman Saitō in Another World, Lavella
- Ao no Orchestra, Hajime Aono's mother

2024

- Delusional Monthly Magazine, Lavella
- Unnamed Memory, Leonora
- Wonderful PreCure!, Sumire Nekoyashiki
- Too Many Losing Heroines!, Sayo Konuki

2025

- Your Forma, Lexie
- From Old Country Bumpkin to Master Swordsman, Lucy Diamond

2026

- Hell Teacher: Jigoku Sensei Nube, Miss Mary
- Ichijyoma Mankitsu Gurashi!, Gao
- Sgt. Frog☆, Aki Hinata

=== Tokusatsu ===
2008

- Tomica Hero: Rescue Force, Maen (eps. 28–49), Dark Commander Voice
- Tomica Hero: Rescue Force Explosive Movie: Rescue the Mach Train!, Maen

2020

- Ganbareiwa!! Robocon: Urara~! Koi Suru Shiru-Nashi Tantanmen!! no Maki, Robocon (voice)

=== Original video animation ===
- Canary (2002), Hoshino Mai
- Dai Mahō-Tōge (2002), Paya-tan
- Pinky:st (2006), Mei
- Maria-sama ga Miteru OVA (2006), Mami Yamaguchi
- Strike Witches OVA (2007), Francesca Lucchini
- Murder Princess (2007), Ana and Yuna
- ARIA The OVA ~ARIETTA~ (2007), Aika S. Granzchesta
- Mahō Sensei Negima! ~Shiroki Tsubasa Ala Alba~ (2008), Anya
- Book Girl Memoir (2010), young Inoue Konoha
- Fate/Prototype (2011), Reiroukan Misaya
- Maken-ki! (2013), Takeko Oyama
- Senran Kagura: Estival Versus – Festival Eve Full of Swimsuits (2015), Imu
- Akatsuki no Yona OVA (2015-2016), Yona
- Learning With Manga! F/GO (2018), Tamamo-no-Mae

=== Original net animation ===
- Double Circle (2013), Nanoha
- Ninja Slayer From Animation (2015), Nancy Lee
- Koyomimonogatari (2016), Senjougahara Hitagi
- Obsolete (2020), Nanami Nanahoshi
- Monogatari Series Off & Monster Season (2024), Senjougahara Hitagi

=== Drama CD ===
- Nishi no Yoki Majo – Astraea Testament, Adel Roland
- Gosick, Victorica de Blois
- Shitateya Koubou ~Artelier Collection, Uuf
- Tokyo*Innocent, Yuzu
- Wild Life (manga), Inu
- GetBackers "TARGET B" (2003), Rena Sendo
- GetBackers "TARGET G" (2003), Rena Sendo
- Lucky Star (2005), Yui Narumi
- Saint Seiya Episode.G (2007), Lithos Chrysalis
- Fate/Kaleid liner Prisma Illya 2wei (2011), Kuro
- Akatsuki no Yona (2012), Yona

=== Video games ===
- Disgaea: Hour of Darkness (2003), Jennifer
- Kunoichi (2003), Hisui
- Lucky Star Moe Drill (2005), Yui Narumi
- White Princess the Second (2005), Rena
- Brave Story: New Traveler (2006), Meena
- Persona 3 FES (2006), Metis
- Trusty Bell: Chopin no Yume (2007), March
- Luminous Arc (2007), Mel
- Magician's Academy (2007), Tanarotte
- Soul Nomad & the World Eaters (2007), Danette
- ARIA the ORIGINATION ~ Aoi Hoshi no El Cielo ~ (2008), Aika S. Granzchesta
- BlazBlue: Calamity Trigger (2008), Taokaka
- Blazer Drive (2008), Tamaki
- Bleach: Heat the Soul 5 (2008), Senna
- Makai Senki Disgaea 3: Absence of Justice (2008), Raspberyl and Asagi
- BlazBlue: Continuum Shift (2009), Taokaka
- Bleach: Heat the Soul 6 (2009), Senna
- Phantasy Star Portable 2 (2009), Emilia
- Tales of Vesperia (2009), Patty Fleur
- Castlevania: Harmony of Despair (2010), Maria Renard
- Danganronpa: Academy of Hope and High School Students of Despair (2010), Aoi Asahina
- Fate/Extra (2010), Caster/Tamamo no Mae
- Rewrite (2011), Kotori Kanbe
- Rune Factory 4 (2011), Frey
- Mugen Souls (2012), Belleria
- Photo Kano (2012), Nonoka Masaki
- Sol Trigger (2012), Fran
- Tears to Tiara II (2013), Izebel
- Akiba's Trip 2 (2013), Toko Sagisaka
- Fate/Extra CCC (2013), Caster/Tamamo no Mae
- Drakengard 3 (2013), Two
- Senran Kagura Shinovi Versus (2013), Imu
- Granblue Fantasy (2014), De La Fille
- Senran Kagura: Estival Versus (2015), Imu
- Fate/Grand Order (2015), Tamamo no Mae, Chevalier D'Eon, Boudica, Tamamo Cat, Tamamo Vitch/Koyanskaya, Chloe von Einzbern
- League of Legends (2015), Orianna (Japanese dub)
- Overwatch (2016), Sombra (Japanese dub)
- Berserk and the Band of the Hawk (2016), Schierke
- Fate/Extella: The Umbral Star (2016), Caster/Tamamo no Mae
- Onmyoji (2016), Ushi no Kokumairi
- Senko no Ronde 2 (2017), Ernula
- Magia Record (2017), Homura Akemi and Hitagi Senjougahara (Madogatari Crossover)
- Infinite Stratos: Archetype Breaker (2017), Tatenashi Sarashiki
- Xenoblade Chronicles 2 (2017), Azami
- Azur Lane (2018), Ashigara, Kongou
- King's Raid (2018), Aisha
- Mahjong Soul (2018), Miki Nikaidō, Nadeshiko (Japanese dub)
- Super Smash Bros. Ultimate (2018), Mii Fighter (Type 6)
- Identity V (2018), Gardener/Emma Woods
- Arknights (2019), Mayer
- Another Eden (2019), Tsubame
- Ash Arms (2019), Semovente M40, Fw 190A-1
- Epic Seven (2019/2026), Diene/Shepherd of the Dark Diene
- Death end re;Quest 2 (2020), Mai Toyama
- Genshin Impact (2020), Jean
- The Legend of Heroes: Trails Through Daybreak (2021), Elaine Auclair
- Blue Archive (2021), Kosaka Wakamo
- Artery Gear: Fusion (2022), Alice, Nemophila
- The Legend of Heroes: Trails Through Daybreak II (2022), Elaine Auclair
- Goddess of Victory: Nikke (2023), Dorothy
- Fate/Samurai Remnant (2023), Tamamo Aria
- Aether Gazer (2023), Hades
- Puyo Puyo Quest (2024), Homura Akemi, Devil Homura (crossover with Puella Magi Madoka Magica)
- Panic in Sweets Land (TBA), Queen Miruru
- Wuthering Waves (2024), Changli
- Shin Megami Tensei V Vengeance (2024), Yoko Hiromine
- Honkai: Star Rail (2025), Castorice
- Magia Exedra (2025), Homura Akemi, Devil Homura
- Stella Sora (2026), Firenze
- Zenless Zone Zero (2026) as Velina Airgid
- Fate/Extra Record (2027) as Caster

=== Films ===
- Bleach: Memories of Nobody (2006), Senna
- Brave Story (2006), Miina
- Keroro Gunsō the Super Movie (2006), Natsumi Hinata
- Chō Gekijōban Keroro Gunsō 2: Shinkai no Princess de Arimasu! (2007), Natsumi Hinata
- Keroro Gunso the Super Movie 3: Keroro vs. Keroro Great Sky Duel (2008), Natsumi Hinata
- Tomica Hero: Rescue Force (2008), Maaen (voice)
- Book Girl (2010), Inoue Konoha (young)
- 009 RE:CYBORG (2012), Françoise Arnoul
- Puella Magi Madoka Magica films (2012-2013), Homura Akemi
- Strike Witches: The Movie (2012), Francesca Lucchini
- Aura: Maryūinkōga Saigo no Tatakai (2013), Hino
- Kuroko's Basketball The Movie: Last Game (2017), Riko Aida
- Fate/kaleid liner Prisma Illya: Vow in the Snow (2017), Chloe Von Einzbern
- Fate/kaleid liner Prisma Illya: Licht – The Nameless Girl (2021), Chloe Von Einzbern
- Shin Gekijōban Keroro Gunsō: Fukkatsu Shite Sokkō Chikyū Metsubō no Kiki de Arimasu! (2026), Natsumi Hinata

=== Dubbing ===
==== Live-action ====
- Famous in Love, Alexis Glenn
- Triloquist, Robin Patterson (Katie Chonacas)

==== Animation ====
- Kid vs. Kat, Cooper "Coop" Burtonburger
- The Loud House, Lincoln Loud
- Tinpo, Hackpo
- Transformers: EarthSpark, Twitch Malto
- Walking with Dinosaurs, Juniper

=== Omake ===
- Maria-sama ni wa naisho (2004), Mami Yamaguchi

=== Other voices ===
- Star Tours – The Adventures Continue at Tokyo Disneyland – Princess Leia
