= Isshoni Training =

Japanese OVA series

いっしょにとれーにんぐ
- Original video animation
- Directed by: Iku Suzuki (#1); Shinichiro Kimura (#2–3)
- Produced by: Muneshige Nakagawa
- Written by: Muneshige Nakagawa
- Music by: Raito
- Studio: Studio Hibari
- Licensed by: NA: Maiden Japan
- Released: April 24, 2009 – December 24, 2010
- Episodes: 3

Isshoni Training (いっしょにとれーにんぐ) is a three-part Japanese original video animation (OVA) series released from April 2009 to December 2010. A mobile game was also released in August 2010.

== Production ==
The entire series was planned, written, and funded by Muneshige Nakagawa, who also founded Primastea to work on the series.

== Media ==
=== OVA ===
The first OVA, titled Isshoni Training: Training with Hinako, was released on April 24, 2009. It was directed by Iku Suzuki and animated by Studio Hibari, with Muneshige Nakagawa writing the scripts and producing the series, Ryoko Amisaki designing the characters, and Raito composing the music. Mai Kadowaki performed the lead role. The second OVA, titled Isshoni Sleeping: Sleeping with Hinako, was released on February 11, 2010. Shinichiro Kimura replaced Suzuki as the director, while the rest of the staff and cast from the first OVA reprised their roles. The third and final OVA, titled Isshoni Training 026: Bathtime with Hinako & Hiyoko was released on December 24, 2010; it featured the same cast and staff from the second OVA. Internationally, the series was licensed by Maiden Japan.

=== Video game ===
A mobile game for Android was released in Japan on August 5, 2010. It was released internationally on May 30, 2011.

== Reception ==
Josh Tolentino from Japanator criticized the series, calling it disappointingly inconsistent. Carlos Ross from THEM Anime Reviews also criticized the series, calling it pointless and creepy. Koiwai from Manga News was also critical, calling the series entertaining for five minutes and no more.

== See also ==
- Hinako (anime character)
