= Pani Poni =

Japanese manga and anime series

- Cover of the first volume, featuring Rebecca Miyamoto

ぱにぽに
- Genre: Parody; Surreal comedy
- Manga
- Written by: Hekiru Hikawa
- Published by: Square Enix
- Magazine: Monthly GFantasy
- Original run: November 2000 – October 2011
- Volumes: 17
- Anime television series

Pani Poni Dash!
- Directed by: Akiyuki Shinbo; Shin Oonuma (Note: Credited as Series Director (シリーズディレクター) in episodes 1-26, and as Assistant Director (アシスタントディレクター) in the OVA.)
- Produced by: Atsushi Moriyama (King Records)
- Written by: Kenichi Kanemaki
- Music by: Kei Haneoka
- Studio: Shaft
- Licensed by: NA: ADV Films (expired); Funimation (expired); Discotek Media (current); UK: ADV Films (expired)
- Original network: TXN (TV Tokyo), AT-X, GBS
- English network: UK: Propeller TV; US: Anime Network, ImaginAsian TV
- Original run: July 4, 2005 – December 26, 2005
- Episodes: 26
- Original video animation
- Directed by: Akiyuki Shinbo; Shin Oonuma
- Produced by: Atsushi Moriyama
- Written by: Katsuhiko Takayama
- Music by: Kei Haneoka
- Studio: Shaft
- Released: April 15, 2009

Pani Poni (Japanese: ぱにぽに), also known by the title of its anime adaptation, Pani Poni Dash! (ぱにぽにだっしゅ!, Pani Poni Dasshu!), is a Japanese manga series written and illustrated by Hekiru Hikawa. It uses parody, frequently referencing Japanese and American pop-culture in many ways. It mainly follows child prodigy Rebecca Miyamoto, an MIT graduate newly hired as a homeroom teacher at Peach Moon Academy, where she deals with the antics of the Class 1-C students during everyday school life. The manga was serialized in Square Enix's Monthly GFantasy between the November 2000 and October 2011 issues, and the chapters are collected in 17 tankōbon volumes.

A 26-episode anime television series adaptation aired in Japan on TV Tokyo between July 4 and December 26, 2005, with its title renamed as Pani Poni Dash!. The anime is licensed by Funimation in North America. There have also been several drama CDs created based on the TV series and manga. A special OVA was released with a DVD box set containing the anime series on April 15, 2009, in Japan.

== Plot ==
Pani Poni Dash!'s central storyline revolves around Rebecca Miyamoto, a child prodigy homeroom teacher, and the antics of her class 1-C. The characters attend a high school called the Peach Moon Academy (桃月学園, Momotsuki Gakuen) where Rebecca has taken up a job as one of the teachers after being the youngest graduate at MIT and is being watched by space aliens who screw up the story every now and then. Though the story hardly strays from the focus of the four first-year classes labeled 1-A through 1-D, the mishaps that occur in them, the teacher's lounge, and on school trips also become sources of material for topical allusions regarding satire, anime, Internet, gaming, and popular culture.

== Media ==
=== Manga ===
Pani Poni was serialized in the manga magazine Monthly GFantasy published by Square Enix between the November 2000 and October 2011 issues. Seventeen volumes were released in Japan. The translated versions of the manga are also released in Taiwan and South Korea, from Chingwin Publishing Group in Taipei and Haksan Publishing in Seoul.

There are four spin-offs of original Pani Poni manga. Most of them features yonkoma style. TG Angel Gyaiko-chan (TG天使ジャイ子ちゃん, TG Tenshi Jaiko-chan) is currently serialized in Tech Gian (Enterbrain) from July 2001, and focuses on Hikaru Nikaido (class 1-A) as a heroine. Maro-Mayu (まろまゆ) was serialized in Dengeki Moeoh between March 2002 and June 2008. It featured Kurumi Momose (1-C) as a heroine and illustrated her part-time job on a cafe. Rei Tachibana (1-C) also took part in some episodes as Rei from the Chinese Restaurant (中華屋のレイちゃん, Chūkaya no Rei-chan). Momo-Gumi!! (桃組っ!!) was serialized in Ace Momogumi (Kadokawa Shoten) from June 2003 to December 2004, when the company discontinued the magazine. It described the fictional Japanese idol group named Momo-gumi!! that Yuna Kashiwagi (1-A) belongs to. The Alternative Cure Magical Girl Behoimi-chan (新感覚癒し系魔法少女ベホイミちゃん, Shin Kankaku Iyashikei Mahō Shōjo Behoimi-chan) is alternately serialized in G Fantasy with Pani Poni from August 2006. It shows how Behoimi (1-D) became a "real" magical girl, and fights against the invaders from other planets.

=== Drama CDs ===
Pani Poni has also created ten drama CDs based on the series, the first of which was released in Japan on February 27, 2004. While the first seven preceded the anime, and thus were based on the manga version, the last three released have been based on the anime adaptation.

=== Anime ===
An anime television series adaptation titled Pani Poni Dash! aired in Japan between July 4 and December 26, 2005, and contained 26 episodes. King Records subsidiary Starchild has the video and music rights for the anime. A special OVA was released with a DVD box set containing the anime series, on April 15, 2009. A Blu-ray box set of the series including the OVA was released in Japan on April 26, 2017. The anime was licensed Funimation in North America (it was once licensed by ADV Films for $138,666 effective on June 30, 2006, but through a fallout of ADV's license partner Sojitz/ARM Corporation, Pani Poni was transferred to Funimation), ADV Films in the United Kingdom, Mighty Media in Taiwan, and TVee.co.kr in South Korea. Funimation released a complete DVD box set on March 10, 2009.

The episode names are based on adages and proverbs. Each episode is only loosely connected to the central plot. Many of the jokes in the series rely on satire, established character behavior, Japanese Internet and anime culture such as emoticons (at some points in the series, a character's face is replaced by an emoticon), or non sequitur comments and actions (especially by Ichijo). The series also contains numerous parodies and references to popular culture, which include Planet of the Apes, Star Trek, The Exorcist, Gundam, Devilman, Super Mario Bros., The Story of Little Black Sambo, Usagi Yojimbo, Doctor Who and the Cthulhu Mythos.

==== Music ====
Opening themes

1. "Yellow Vacation" (黄色いバカンス, Kiiroi bakansu) by Peach Moon Academy Class 1-C (feat. Himeko in TV episodes 2–9, 14, DVD episodes 1–8, 25 and OVA; feat. Rei in TV episodes 11, 13, 16; feat. Kurumi in TV episode 17 and DVD episode 15; feat. Rokugō in TV episodes 19, 22)
2. "Roulette☆Roulette " (ルーレット☆ルーレット, Rūretto☆Rūretto) by Peach Moon Academy Class 1-C (feat. Ichijo in TV episodes 10, 12, 15, 18 and DVD episodes 9–14, 16)
3. "Girl Q" (少女Q, Shōjo kyū) by Peach Moon Academy Class 1-C (feat. Miyako in TV episodes 20–21, 23 and DVD episodes 17–23; feat. Rokugō in TV episode 24 and DVD episode 24)

Ending themes

1. "Girlppi" (ガールッピ, Gāruppi) by Peach Moon Academy Class 1-A&B (in TV and DVD episodes 1–7, 9–12)
2. "Healing-type Magical Girl Behoimi" (癒し系魔法少女ベホイミ, Iyashikei mahō shōjo behoimi) by Behoimi (in TV and DVD episodes 8)
3. "Faraway Dream" (遙かな夢, Haruka na yume) by Rebecca Miyamoto (in TV and DVD episodes 13, 25)
4. "Moonlight Love" (ムーンライト・ラブ, Mūnraito rabu) by Peach Moon Academy Class 1-D (in TV and DVD episodes 14-23 and OVA)
5. "Snow, Moon, and Flower" (雪月花, Setsugekka) by Rebecca Miyamoto (in TV and DVD episode 24)
6. "Yellow Vacation" (黄色いバカンス, Kiiroi bakansu) by Peach Moon Academy Class 1-C (feat. Himeko in TV and DVD episode 26)

=== Internet radio shows ===
Pani Poni Dash has two internet radio shows titled The Alternative Curing Labo of Magical Girl Behoimi (魔法少女ベホイミの｢新感覚☆癒し研究室｣, Mahō Shōjo Behoimi no Shinkankaku Iyashi Kenkyūshitsu) and Pani Radi Dash! (ぱにらじだっしゅ!, Pani Raji Dasshu!). The first one was aired from November 2005 to February 2006, while the latter one was aired from December 2005 to September 2006, both on Animate TV. The shows were hosted by Mai Kadowaki and Chiwa Saito who played Behoimi (1-D) and Rebecca "Becky" Miyamoto in the anime respectively.

While the latter one was remixed as "DJCD"s, the former has never been officially released.
