= Fate/kaleid liner Prisma Illya 2wei =

- Season 2
- Promotional poster of Prisma Illya 2wei, featuring Illyasviel von Einzbern (left), Miyu Edelfelt (center) and Kuro (right)
- No. of episodes: 10 + OVA

Release
- Original network: Tokyo MX
- Original release: July 10 – September 11, 2014

Season chronology
- ← Previous; Season 1 Next → 2wei Herz!

Fate/kaleid liner Prisma Illya 2wei (Fate/kaleid liner プリズマ☆イリヤ ツヴァイ！) is the second season of the Fate/kaleid liner Prisma Illya anime series. The episodes were directed by Shin Oonuma and Masato Jinbo and animated by Silver Link. The season is based on the first half of Hiroshi Hiroyama's Fate/kaleid liner Prisma Illya 2wei manga series, which is the second series of the Prisma Illya manga; an alternate universe spin-off of Type-Moon's visual novel Fate/stay night in which the events of the Fourth Holy Grail War from Fate/Zero never occurred and Illya lived a normal life. The plot of this season focuses on the arrival of Illya's "clone" Kuro, Illya learning more about her past as well as her role in the Holy Grail War and finding the rest of the Class Cards.

Prisma Illya 2wei was first announced on September 14, 2013, with the final episode of season one including a teaser at the end, announcing that the anime would return next summer for a second season. The season originally aired from July 10, 2014, to September 9, 2014, on Tokyo MX and lasted ten episodes. Five Blu-ray compilations were released in Japan, with each one containing two episodes, with each one containing a 5-minute-long OVA, the first of which is titled "First Bra: Illya-hen". Sentai Filmworks acquired the rights to the season and released an English dub of the season on DVD and Blu-ray disc on February 16, 2016. The discs include the original Japanese dub with English subtitles.

This season features two pieces of theme music that are used for the episodes: one for the opening and one for the ending. The opening theme is "moving soul" by Minami Kuribayashi and the ending theme is "Two By Two" by Yumeha Kouda.

== Episodes ==
No. overall	No. in season	Title	Original air date
11	1	"Illya Grow Up!?"; Transliteration: "Iriya grow up!?" (Japanese: イリヤ grow up!?)	July 10, 2014
With the ley lines failing to recover despite the cards being retrieved, Rin and Luvia bring Illya and Miyu with them to help seal the lines. However, something goes wrong, leading Illya to become split into two separate people.
12	2	"Illya x Illya"; Transliteration: "Iriya Iriya" (Japanese: イリヤ x イリヤ)	July 17, 2014
Illya finds herself targeted by her dark clone, Kuro Illya, whose creation has resulted in Illya's power becoming weaker. Rin and the others attempt to lure Kuro into a trap, but her ability to read everyone's moves leaves them at a disadvantage. However, Illya manages to draw Kuro into a bog, allowing her to be captured.
13	3	"Normal Life Breaker"; Transliteration: "Nichijō Bureikā" (Japanese: 日常ブレイカー)	July 24, 2014
After failing to get any information from Kuro, Rin places a seal on her that would cause her pain if anything happens to Illya. When Kuro escapes, Illya has to take drastic measures to keep her from making moves on Shirou. The next day, Kuro causes more problems for Illya when she starts randomly kissing other girls at school to replenish mana. When the two are spotted together by her classmates, Kuro decides to pose as Illya's cousin.
14	4	"Wild Transfer Student"; Transliteration: "Arashi no Tenkōsei" (Japanese: 嵐の転校生)	July 31, 2014
Kuro transfers into Illya's class, much to Illya's dismay, and is immediately thrust into a dodgeball match against the classmates she kissed the other day. Feeling her school life is at risk, Illya steps in to challenge Kuro one-on-one, with both sides bringing out their full magical power. Kuro lands a critical hit on Illya's face, but due to their shared pain they both pass out, ending the match in a draw. Whilst recovering, Kuro suspects the school nurse knows more about her existence than she lets on. As Shirou comes to pick up Illya, Miyu is a little perturbed by Kuro's words that she shouldn't stay too close to Illya, lest she find out things she has been keeping secret.
15	5	"Well, In Other Words"; Transliteration: "Sore wa, Tsumari" (Japanese: それは, つまり)	August 7, 2014
After Illya inadvertently blows up her house's bathroom wall, her family comes over to Luvia's house to use her bathroom, where Kuro causes more trouble for Illya. Later, as Rin and Luvia ask Illya about how she used the Archer Card in the manner she did, Illya's statement of wanting to return to a normal life angers Kuro, who reveals she herself possesses the Archer Card and escapes. The next day, Miyu is summoned by Kuro, who claims Illya's wish of a normal life excludes Miyu and the other people she had met as well too. However, Miyu has faith in her friendship with Illya and uses the Saber Card to stand up against Kuro.
16	6	"On the Other Side of Lies and Façade"; Transliteration: "Uso to Tsuyogari no Mukōgawa" (Japanese: 嘘と強がりの向こう側)	August 14, 2014
Miyu and Kuro have an intense battle before Illya arrives to try and stop them, apologising for the words she said before. When Irisviel suddenly arrives to pick Illya up, Kuro tries to attack her, but she stops her with her own magic. Irisviel reveals Kuro was sealed away so that Illya can become the Holy Grail, with Kuro becoming upset when she learns the Holy Grail War no longer takes place, feeling she has no place to belong. She ends up overusing her mana and starts to disappear, but Illya gives her some of her own mana so that she can last longer. Told by Illya to make her own wish come true, Kuro wishes to have a family, allowing her to come back into existence as a proper member of Illya's family.
17	7	"Clash! Cooking Sisters"; Transliteration: "Gekitotsu! Kukkin Shisutāzu" (Japanese: 激突! クッキン·シスターズ)	August 21, 2014
Illya ends up competing in a baking contest against Kuro, winding up at a disadvantage due to one of her teammates adding bizarre ingredients. The next day, Illya tries to learn how to be regarded by Kuro as a "big sister", with not much success. Later, though, Kuro states how she is relying on Illya to keep supplying her with mana.
18	8	"Her Name Is"; Transliteration: "Kanojo no Na wa" (Japanese: 彼女の名は)	August 28, 2014
Irisviel has Rin and Luvia sneak her into Illya's school to observe her during classes, later asking them to leave Illya and Kuro to their normal lives. Later that day, as Rin observes a change in the ley lines and Miyu is sent on an errand, a mysterious woman named Bazett Fraga McRemitz appears before Luvia, demanding she hand over the Class Cards. As Luvia and her butler, Auguste, battle against Bazett, Rin tries to find the opportunity to launch a sneak attack, but both their attacks fail, as Bazett prepares to make a move against Illya and Kuro.
19	9	"Lone Battle"; Transliteration: "Hitori no Tatakai" (Japanese: 独りの戦い)	September 4, 2014
Bazett, who was previously responsible for collecting the Class Cards, launches a fierce attack against Illya and Kuro in an attempt to take their cards, completely overwhelming them. Just as they are cornered, Miyu arrives and uses the power of the Rider card Illya managed to protect to fight back against Bazett.
20	10	"The Things Those Hands Protected"; Transliteration: "Sono Te ga Mamotta Mono wa" (Japanese: その手が守ったものは)	September 11, 2014
Bazett uses her weapon, Fragarach, to counter Miyu's strongest move and take her card, soon setting her sights on Kuro. However, working together with Kuro and Ruby, Illya manages to activate a seal that Rin left behind, allegedly giving her the same curse as Kuro and leaving her unable to harm Illya. Rin also reveals the existence of an eighth card, convincing Bazett to form a truce and leave Illya with half of the cards. As the girls resume their everyday lives and look forward to their trip to the beach, the mysterious eighth card lies in slumber.
OVA	0	"Magical Girl in Hot Springs Inn"; Transliteration: "Mahō Shōjo in Onsen Ryokō" (Japanese: 魔法少女in温泉旅行)	July 25, 2015
Illya and co. go to a hot springs inn, where Rin and Luvia are carrying out a secret mission. During the trip, Kuro discovers that the hot springs cause a greater drain on her mana than usual, so Illya and Miyu make up for it by doing other fun activities with her. Later that night, the girls investigate a magic point, which creates a hidden hot spring and rectifies the properties of the hot springs in the region.

== Cast and characters ==
- Mai Kadowaki as Illyasviel von Einzbern
- Kaori Nazuka as Miyu Edelfelt
- Chiwa Saito as Kuro / Chloe von Einzbern
- Kana Ueda as Rin Tohsaka
- Shizuka Itou as Luviagelita Edelfelt
- Naoko Takano as Magical Ruby
- Miyu Matsuki as Magical Sapphire
- Noriaki Sugiyama as Shirou Emiya
- Haruhi Terada as Sella
- Miho Miyagawa as Leysritt
- Miki Itou as Taiga Fujimura
- Mariya Ise as Nanaki Moriyama
- Emiri Katō as Tatsuko Gakumazawa
- Kanae Itō as Suzuka Kurihara
- Satomi Satou as Mimi Katsura

== Reception ==
=== Sales ===
Prisma Illya 2wei proved to be extremely popular in home video release.

=== Critical response ===
Prisma Illya 2wei has been well received by critics, with most reviewers reacting positively to the addition of Kuro into the cast. Review site Anime-Evo gave 2wei an "A", praising the plot, action sequences and characters, especially Kuro for "chang[ing] up the dynamic" of the series. Chris Beveridge of The Fandom Post stated that while the story wasn't as engaging as that of the first season, the inclusion of Kuro and her story in regards to Illya was a good addition to the story and the anime was still entertaining to watch.

== See also ==
- List of Fate/stay night characters
- List of Fate/Zero characters
