= Book Girl (film) =

- Theatrical poster

Japanese name
- Kanji: 劇場版文学少女
Transcriptions
- Revised Hepburn: Gekijōban Bungaku Shōjo
- Directed by: Shunsuke Tada
- Screenplay by: Yuka Yamada
- Story by: Mizuki Nomura (novels)
- Produced by: Masahito Arinaga; Takeshi Hashimoto; Katsumi Koike; Kenta Suzuki; Yuichirō Takahata
- Starring: Kana Hanazawa; Miyu Irino; Aya Hirano; Nana Mizuki; Aki Toyosaki; Daisuke Ono; Shizuka Itō; Mamoru Miyano
- Music by: Masumi Itō
- Production company: Production I.G
- Distributed by: Pony Canyon
- Release date: May 1, 2010
- Running time: 103 minutes
- Country: Japan
- Language: Japanese
- Box office: 59 million yen

Book Girl (劇場版文学少女, Gekijōban Bungaku Shōjo; Book Girl Film Edition) is a Japanese anime film directed by Shunsuke Tada and produced by Production I.G as a commemoration of Enterbrain's ten-year anniversary. The film is based on the light novel series Book Girl written by Mizuki Nomura, with illustrations by Miho Takeoka. It was released in Japanese theaters on May 1, 2010 and later released on Blu-ray Disc and DVD on August 27, 2010, by Pony Canyon.

== Plot ==
Shortly after entering high school, Konoha Inoue (Miyu Irino) is recruited into the literature club by Tohko Amano (Kana Hanazawa), the president and sole member of the club, after he witnesses her ripping out a page of a book and eating it. Instead of eating actual food, Tohko can only eat stories by consuming the paper they are printed on. Konoha spends his days after school writing short stories for Tohko as "snacks". Tohko had previously set up a birdhouse on the school grounds so anyone could ask the literature club to help them in matters of love by submitting letters. Tohko and Konoha find a piece of paper in the birdhouse one day, but there is only a childish illustration on it. Tohko recognizes the drawing to be from the original manuscript of Kenji Miyazawa's poem "Songs of a Defeated Young Man". When Tohko finds the same image in the birdhouse five days in a row, they decide to stake out the scene at night, and they find Chia Takeda (Aki Toyosaki), a friend of Konoha's classmate Nanase Kotobuki (Nana Mizuki). She tells Konoha that the pictures are from Miu Asakura (Aya Hirano).

After New Years, Konoha goes to see Nanase in the hospital, who had fallen down the stairs. There, he finds Nanase confronting Miu, who had previously attempted to kill herself when she and Konoha were in junior high school. This was due in part to Konoha winning a new author's contest with his novel Similar to the Sky, which he wrote under the pen name Miu Inoue. Miu had wanted to enter and win, though in the end she only sent in blank sheets to make Konoha believe she had participated. Miu eventually tells Konoha that she hates him. Later, she escapes from the hospital, and Konoha goes to find her at the roof of their junior high school, where she had tried to kill herself. After explaining her reasons for doing so (that she wants Konoha to herself since she has no one but him and he has left her alone). She influences Konoha to jump from the roof with her to which he agrees. Just as they are about to fall, Tohko arrives and Konoha manages to prevent Miu from jumping. However, back on street level, Miu jumps in front of a truck and gets hit. Afterward, Miu seemingly believes to be a third grader and has lost most mobility in her arms and legs. Konoha had dropped school in order to take care of Miu always and also resigns from the literature club, to which Tohko replies she'll be waiting for his stories (as he decides never to write again). In the hospital, it is out screened that Miu has been acting as a mentally affected person for Konoha (by Nanase).

Tohko takes them to a planetarium and draws parallels between Konoha and Miu and the main characters in Similar to the Sky. Miu had always wanted to make people happy because her parents were always fighting as she grew up. Konoha tells Miu that he wrote the novel to tell her how much he loved her. Realizing that someone had loved her, Miu apologizes for everything she did to Konoha. When he realizes Tohko has disappeared, Konoha races to the train station and finds her there. She tells him that she got accepted to the university in Hokkaidō and that she can no longer eat his stories anymore. On the train, Tohko explains that she wants him to become everyone's author instead of keeping him all to herself. After Konoha departs the train, they have a final goodbye kiss and Tohko departs on the train. Years later, Konoha has put out his second novel titled Book Girl, and an editor comes to his house to read his newest work before it gets released. Konoha knows the editor as she is the library girl (Tohko).

== Production and release ==
The Book Girl film, animated by Production I.G, was produced by the Book Girl Production Committee, which includes: Enterbrain, Pony Canyon, T.O Entertainment, Lantis and Kadokawa Contents Gate. The screenplay was written by Yuka Yamada, and features character design by Keita Matsumoto, who based the designs on Miho Takeoka's original illustrations. The art director for the film was Michie Suzuki and there were six animation directors: Kazuya Kise, Yōsuke Okuda, Keiichi Sano, Kanami Sekiguchi, Kyōhei Tezuka, and Yūko Yoshida. The music was produced by Masumi Itō, with Masafumi Mima and Toshihiko Nakajima as the sound directors. Book Girl was released on Blu-ray Disc as a limited edition and DVD as limited and regular editions in Japan by Pony Canyon on August 27, 2010. The film's theme song is "Haruka na Hibi" (遥かな日々, Distant Days) by Eufonius; the single was released on May 1, 2010, by Lantis. The film's original soundtrack titled Musique du film was released on May 1, 2010, by Lantis.
