= Fate/kaleid liner Prisma Illya =

Japanese manga series and its adaptations

- Cover of the first manga volume, featuring Illyasviel von Einzbern

Fate/kaleid liner プリズマ☆イリヤ (Feito Kareido Rainā Purizuma Iriya)
- Genre: Magical girl
- Created by: Hiroshi Hiroyama; Type-Moon
- Manga
- Written by: Hiroshi Hiroyama
- Published by: Kadokawa Shoten
- English publisher: NA: Seven Seas Entertainment
- Magazine: Comp Ace
- Original run: September 26, 2007 – November 26, 2008
- Volumes: 2
- Manga

Fate/kaleid liner Prisma Illya 2wei!
- Written by: Hiroshi Hiroyama
- Published by: Kadokawa Shoten
- Magazine: Comp Ace
- Original run: April 26, 2009 – March 26, 2012
- Volumes: 5
- Manga

Fate/kaleid liner Prisma Illya 3rei!!
- Written by: Hiroshi Hiroyama
- Published by: Kadokawa Shoten
- Magazine: Comp Ace
- Original run: May 26, 2012 – present
- Volumes: 14
- Anime television series
- Directed by: Shin Oonuma; Takashi Sakamoto; Mirai Minato
- Produced by: Junichirou Tamura; Ai Matsuki
- Written by: Kenji Inoue
- Music by: Tatsuya Kato
- Studio: Silver Link
- Licensed by: AUS: Hanabee; NA: Sentai Filmworks; SEA: Medialink; UK: Anime Limited
- Original network: Tokyo MX, Sun TV, TVQ, CTC, TV Saitama, GBS, MTV, tvk, BS11, AT-X, Niconico
- English network: US: Anime Network
- Original run: July 13, 2013 – September 14, 2013
- Episodes: 10 + OVA
- Anime television series

Fate/kaleid liner Prisma Illya 2wei!
- Directed by: Shin Oonuma; Masato Jinbo
- Produced by: Junichirou Tamura; Ai Matsuki
- Written by: Kenji Inoue
- Music by: Tatsuya Kato
- Studio: Silver Link
- Licensed by: AUS: Hanabee; NA: Sentai Filmworks; SEA: Medialink
- Original network: Tokyo MX, Sun TV, TVQ, CTC, TV Saitama, GBS, MTV, tvk, BS11, AT-X
- English network: US: Anime Network
- Original run: July 10, 2014 – September 11, 2014
- Episodes: 10 + OVA
- Video game

Prisma Illya
- Developer: Kadokawa Games
- Publisher: Kadokawa Games
- Genre: Card game/Action-adventure
- Platform: Nintendo 3DS
- Released: July 31, 2014
- Anime television series

Fate/kaleid liner Prisma Illya 2wei! Herz!
- Directed by: Shin Oonuma; Masato Jinbo
- Produced by: Junichirou Tamura; Yukiko Katou
- Written by: Kenji Inoue
- Music by: Tatsuya Kato
- Studio: Silver Link
- Licensed by: AUS: Madman Entertainment; NA: Sentai Filmworks; SEA: Medialink
- Original network: Tokyo MX, Sun TV, TVQ, CTC, TV Saitama, GBS, MTV, tvk, BS11, AT-X
- English network: US: Anime Network
- Original run: July 25, 2015 – September 26, 2015
- Episodes: 10
- Anime television series

Fate/kaleid liner Prisma Illya 3rei!!
- Directed by: Shin Oonuma; Masato Jinbo; Ken Takahashi
- Produced by: Junichirou Tamura; Yukiko Katou
- Written by: Kenji Inoue
- Music by: Tatsuya Kato; Technoboys Pulcraft Green-Fund
- Studio: Silver Link
- Licensed by: Crunchyroll: SEA: Medialink
- Original network: AT-X, Tokyo MX, Sun TV, TVQ, Chiba TV, tvk, TV Saitama, BS11
- Original run: July 6, 2016 – September 21, 2016
- Episodes: 12
- Anime film

Fate/kaleid liner Prisma Illya: Vow in the Snow
- Directed by: Shin Oonuma
- Produced by: Junichirou Tamura; Yukiko Katou
- Written by: Kenji Inoue; Hazuki Minase
- Studio: Silver Link
- Licensed by: Sentai Filmworks
- Released: August 26, 2017
- Runtime: 90 minutes
- Original video animation

Fate/kaleid liner Prisma Illya: Prisma Phantasm
- Directed by: Shin Oonuma
- Produced by: Junichirou Tamura; Yukiko Katou; Toshinori Fujiwara; Noritomo Isogai; Shiryuu Kitazawa; Mitsuhiro Ogata; Youichi Sekine; Mieko Tsuruta
- Written by: Kenji Inoue; Hazuki Minase
- Music by: Tatsuya Kato
- Studio: Silver Link
- Licensed by: Sentai Filmworks
- Released: June 14, 2019
- Runtime: 62 minutes
- Anime film

Fate/kaleid liner Prisma Illya: Licht - The Nameless Girl
- Directed by: Shin Oonuma
- Produced by: Toshinori Fujiwara; Noritomo Isogai; Hayato Kaneko; Soujirou Arimizu; Hiroo Saitou; Terushige Yoshie
- Written by: Kenji Inoue; Hazuki Minase
- Music by: Tatsuya Kato; Tomohisa Ishikawa
- Studio: Silver Link
- Licensed by: Sentai Filmworks
- Released: August 27, 2021
- Runtime: 95 minutes
- Anime television series

Fate/kaleid liner Prisma Illya Finale
- Directed by: Shin Oonuma; Ken Takahashi
- Written by: Kenji Inoue; Hazuki Minase
- Studio: Silver Link
- Original run: 2027 – scheduled
- icon

Fate/kaleid liner Prisma Illya (Japanese: Fate/kaleid liner プリズマ☆イリヤ, Hepburn: Feito Kareido Rainā Purizuma Iriya) is a Japanese manga series by Hiroshi Hiroyama (also known as KALMIA), serialized in Kadokawa Shoten's Comp Ace magazine from 2007 to 2008. It is an alternate universe spin-off of the Fate/stay night visual novel by Type-Moon, with Illyasviel von Einzbern as the protagonist. Various other characters from Fate/stay night and its sequels and spin-offs also appear. A second manga series titled Fate/kaleid liner Prisma Illya 2wei (Fate/kaleid liner, プリズマ☆イリヤ ツヴァイ！) was serialized from 2009 to 2012. A third manga series titled Fate/kaleid liner Prisma Illya 3rei!! (Fate/kaleid liner, プリズマ☆イリヤ ドライ！！) began serialization in 2012.

A 10-episode anime television series adaptation by Silver Link aired on Tokyo MX between July and September 2013. A second season, adapting the sequel manga, aired between July and September 2014. A third season titled Fate/kaleid liner Prisma Illya 2wei! Herz! began airing in July 2015. A fourth season titled Fate/kaleid liner Prisma Illya 3rei!! aired between July and September 2016. An animated film was released in 2017. An OVA titled Fate/kaleid liner Prisma Illya: Prisma Phantasm was released on June 14, 2019. A second film titled Fate/kaleid liner Prisma Illya: Licht - The Nameless Girl was released on August 27, 2021, and featured the same director, scriptwriter, character designer, and studio as the previous film. A fifth and final season titled Fate/kaleid liner Prisma Illya Finale is set to premiere in 2027.

A video game adaptation titled Prisma Illya (プリズマ☆イリヤ), published by Kadokawa Games for the Nintendo 3DS, was released in Japan on July 31, 2014.

== Plot ==
Illyasviel von Einzbern is an ordinary elementary school student who becomes a magical girl when the magical Kaleidostick Ruby deems her a more suitable master than the sorceress, Rin Tohsaka. Rin, who had been tasked by the wizard Zelretch to collect the seven Class Cards containing the spirits of Heroic Spirits from legend, finds that she is unable to change Ruby's mind and must supervise Illya in completing the task of collecting the Class Cards. During Illya's adventures, she receives a friend and rival in a girl named Miyu, the contracted master of the Kaleidostick Sapphire, which similarly abandoned its original master and Rin's rival, Luvia Edelfelt.

After a series of battles, Illya and Miyu were able to collect all Cards and became good friends, while Rin and Luvia remained in Japan by the order of Zelretch. However, the appearance of Kuro, a dark-skinned girl with a striking resemblance to Illya, soon complicates their lives as she attempts to eliminate Illya. Their battle is interrupted by the arrival of Illya's mother, Irisviel, who reveals that Kuro was originally intended to be the Holy Grail in the Holy Grail War, but after the war was prevented Kuro was sealed away so Illya could live a normal life. Illya supplies Kuro with the mana needed to sustain her physical form, and accepts her into the Einzbern family.

Shortly afterwards, the group is attacked by Bazett Fraga McRemitz, who was previously responsible for obtaining the Class Cards. A truce is forced when Rin reveals the existence of an eighth Class Card. The group confronts the eighth Class Card, Gilgamesh, who reveals that Miyu hails from a parallel world where she was born as a Holy Grail, before absorbing her. Illya combines the Kaleidostick Ruby and Sapphire to become Kaleido Liner Zwei, giving her the power to defeat Gilgamesh and save Miyu.

This victory is short-lived, as Miyu is kidnapped by the Ainsworth family and whisked away into the parallel world. Illya and her friends enter the parallel world and teams up with Tanaka, an amnesiac girl whose goal is to defeat the Ainsworths; Gilgamesh, who wishes to take back his Class Card from the Ainsworths following his defeat by Illya; and a parallel Shirou Emiya, Miyu's older brother who is imprisoned by the Ainsworths. The Ainsworths reveal that they intend to use Miyu as the Holy Grail to save their dying world, but Illya swears that she will find a way to save the parallel world without sacrificing Miyu. Following a confrontation, the Ainsworths escape and Gilgamesh leaves the group after reclaiming his Class Card, while Angelica Ainsworth reluctantly joins the group after being left to die by her family and Miyu and Shirou are liberated.

== Characters ==
=== Main characters ===
Illyasviel von Einzbern (イリヤスフィール・フォン・アインツベルン, Iriyasufīru fon Aintsuberun)
Voiced by: Mai Kadowaki (Japanese); Cynthia Martinez (English)
In contrast with her Fate/stay night counterpart, Illya has had a normal childhood, growing up with no knowledge of magic or the Holy Grail War. She lives with her adored brother Shirou and is looked after by her maids Leysritt and Sella when her parents Kiritsugu and Irisviel are away. She is a fan of magical girl anime, and daydreams about becoming one. When she encounters a magic wand named "Magical Ruby", Illya is tricked into signing a contract and becoming a magical girl. She is also quite naive and carefree in comparison to her original version, even being ready to call herself, Miyu and Chloe as enamoured lesbians to hide their real activity as magical girls.

Magical Ruby (マジカルルビー, Majikaru Rubī)
Voiced by: Naoko Takano (Japanese); Joanne Bonasso (English)
A Kaleidostick, a magical device that enables its user to become a magical girl. Though Ruby initially belongs to Rin, Rin's constant squabbling with Luvia causes Ruby to abandon Rin and contract herself to Illya instead. Sapphire calls her "nee-san". Ruby has a mischievous personality, and always teases Illya for her own amusement, as Illya's reactions always surpass her expectations.

Miyu Edelfelt (美遊・エーデルフェルト, Miyu Ēderuferuto)
Voiced by: Kaori Nazuka (Japanese); Caitlynn French (English)
A mysterious girl who is chosen by Sapphire to become her new master and then adopted by Luvia. She takes her duties as a Magical Girl very seriously and is initially dismissive of Illya's abilities, but gradually warms up to Illya, becoming admirative and highly protective of her.

Magical Sapphire (マジカルサファイア, Majikaru Safaia)
Voiced by: Miyu Matsuki (season 1 and 2wei!), Yumi Kakazu (3rei onwards) (Japanese); Molly Searcy (English)
A Kaleidostick, the younger sister of Magical Ruby, that enables Miyu to become a Magical Girl. Sapphire was originally assigned to Luvia, but, as with Ruby, Sapphire abandoned Luvia after becoming tired of her constant quarreling with Rin. She is the voice of reason of the duo, and is always serious about her job as a Kaleidostick.

Rin Tohsaka (遠坂 凛, Tōsaka Rin)
Voiced by: Kana Ueda (Japanese); Carli Mosier (English)

A young sorceress sent by the wizard Kischur Zelretch Schweinorg to Japan in order to capture the Class Cards using the powers of a Magical Girl. After Ruby abandons her for Illya, Rin forces Illya to accomplish her mission in her stead, all while guiding and supervising Illya. Though normally competent, her constant fighting with Luvia often causes them to create various embarrassing blunders, leaving Illya and Miyu with a negative opinion of their skills.

Luviagelita Edelfelt (ルヴィアゼリッタ・エーデルフェルト, Ruviazeritta Ēderuferuto)
Voiced by: Shizuka Itō (Japanese); Shelley Calene-Black (English)
A wealthy and proud young woman and sorceress assigned to work together with Rin to capture the Class Cards. After Sapphire abandons her, Luvia immediately adopts Sapphire's new master, Miyu, and guides her to capture the Class Cards. She is indiscriminate in using her wealth, erecting a mansion across the street from the Einzbern house in a single day, where she and Miyu are currently living. Her rivalry with Rin stems from both their naturally clashing personalities and their mutual crush on Shirou, who fails to notice their attraction to him.

Kuro (クロ) / Chloe von Einzbern (クロエ・フォン・アインツベルン, Kuroe fon Aintsuberun)
Voiced by: Chiwa Saitō (Japanese); Kira Vincent-Davis (English)
A mysterious girl who is identical to Illya, save for her dark skin, white hair and golden eyes, appears after Illya and Miyu capture all the Class Cards. She is an antagonistic presence and her initial goal is to destroy Illya for reasons unknown. Kuro's existence is later revealed to be another side of Illya that was previously sealed away so that Illya could live an ordinary life. In order to maintain existence, she must obtain mana from others by kissing them. After the "power struggle" in the Einzbern house, she is considered the "little sister" of Illya. Chloe is generous with her affections toward both Shirou and any girl she meets, especially Illya. Due to this, she often becomes the main source of yuri fanservice in the manga and the show.

=== Einzbern family ===
Shirou Emiya (衛宮 士郎, Emiya Shirō)

Voiced by: Noriaki Sugiyama (Japanese); Patrick Poole (English)
Illya's adoptive older brother, an ordinary young man who seems to often wind up in unfortunate situations. Illya and Chloe have a crush on him and he is rather popular with girls, including Rin, Luvia, Sakura Matō, Caren and Moriyama Nanami (Nanaki's older sister), though he fails to notice that they are openly attracted to him. Shirou tends to be treated poorly by the people around him, though he admits that he's gotten used to being at the bottom rung of the ladder. In essence, he is an open parody version of the original Shirou from Fate/stay night, whose features have been purposely raised to a comic level.
An alternate version of him, raised by Miyu's family, appears to have learned magecraft and is more similar in personality to the hotblooded Shirou in Fate/stay night and is currently shackled and imprisoned by the Ainsworth family, but later escaped after hearing that Miyu was in trouble and is assisting the girls in rescuing her.

Sella (セラ, Sera) and Leysritt (リーゼリット, Rīzeritto)
Voiced by: Haruhi Nanao (Japanese); Beth Lazarou (season 1), Tiffany Grant (season 2) (English) (Sella)
Voiced by: Miho Miyagawa (Japanese); Meaghan Avocato (English) (Leysritt)
Sella and Leysritt are maids in the Einzbern household and Illya and Shirou's primary caretakers. Sella is a woman who is easily irritated by the disturbances in the household, but is dedicated to Illya and takes her duties seriously. In contrast, Leysritt is easy-going and doesn't hesitate to shirk her duties and have Shirou do them instead. Nevertheless, she is very enthusiastic and sympathetic towards both Illya and Shirou. Sella has a tendency of thinking that Shirou is a lolicon and siscon, and beats him everytime he has his lucky pervert moments.

Irisviel von Einzbern (アイリスフィール・フォン・アインツベルン, Airisufīru fon Aintsuberun) and Kiritsugu Emiya (衛宮 切嗣, Emiya Kiritsugu)
Voiced by: Sayaka Ohara (Japanese); Maggie Flecknoe (English) (Irisviel)
Voiced by: Rikiya Koyama (Japanese); David Matranga (English) (Kiritsugu)
Illya and Shirou's parents, who are both often away from home and working hard to make sure their children can live ordinary lives. Irisviel is an eccentric woman who loves Illya and Shirou deeply and has enough skill to knock out Chloe with a single blow. In spite of being away, she and Illya share a close relationship. Though she is a descendant of a long line of magi, she and Kiritsugu left the Einzbern family shortly after Illya was born. Kiritsugu has yet to make a formal appearance in the series, though Shirou expresses the wish for him to return, mostly because he feels downtrodden by the overwhelming female presence in his household.
An alternate version of Kiritsugu appears in the alternate world through flashbacks as Miyu's and alternate Shirou's adoptive father, searching for the "Child of God" who could save their world, but is already dead in the present.

=== Homurahara Academy ===
Taiga Fujimura (藤村 大河, Fujimura Taiga)
Voiced by: Miki Ito (Japanese); Allison Sumrall (English)
Illya and Miyu's homeroom teacher at school.

Mimi Katsura (桂 美々, Katsura Mimi)
Voiced by: Satomi Satō (Japanese); Brittney Karbowski (English)
A girl in Illya's circle of friends, who happens to be an honor student. She takes a liking to Boy's Love after watching the relationship of Illya-Miyu-Chloe and Shirou-Issei, and becomes a fujoshi after Suzuka and her sister introduce her to the realm of doujinshi. She has a little brother.

Issei Ryuudou (柳洞 一成, Ryūdō Issei)
Voiced by: Mitsuaki Madono (Japanese); Bryson Baugus (English)
The heir to the only-men Ryuudou Temple, and best friends with Shirou Emiya. Like his Fate/stay Night counterpart, he is also a member of the student council.

Tatsuko Gakumazawa (嶽間沢 龍子, Gakumazawa Tatsuko)
Voiced by: Emiri Katō (Japanese); Emily Neves (English)
A short girl with blonde hair in Illya's circle of friends. She is the most troublesome to the group, and an airhead. She constantly brings trouble to anything they do, like adding nutmeg and mints into pound cake in cooking class (she thought they were making hamburg steaks), even though her father says that she already helps so much by not helping at all. Even though she is the heiress to Gakumazawa-style dojo, she has no talent for martial arts at all.

Suzuka Kurihara (栗原 雀花, Kurihara Suzuka)
Voiced by: Kanae Itō (Japanese); Nancy Novotny (English)
A black-haired girl wearing red-frame spectacles who is in Illya's circle of friends. She is the rational mind of the group. She has an older sister, who is a doujin manga artist.

Nanaki Moriyama (森山 那奈亀, Moriyama Nanaki)
Voiced by: Mariya Ise (Japanese); Juliet Simmons (English)
A pink-haired girl in Illya's circle of friends. She resents Luvia and Rin (who she calls 'blonde drills' and 'twintails' respectively) for stand in the way of her elder sister's love (her sister likes Shirou Emiya). She happens to be a genius, as she masters the Gakumazawa-style martial art in less than a few minutes but her laziness prevents her from utilizing her talents efficiently.

Caren Hortensia (カレン・オルテンシア, Karen Orutenshia)
Voiced by: Ami Koshimizu (Japanese); Courtney Lomelo (English)
The school nurse, a woman who has been observing Illya, Miyu and Chloe. She displays absolutely no interest in the events, and she is rather carefree about her job as a nurse. She is later revealed to be the Church's representative in the affair related to the Class Cards, working as background support as well as supervisor. It is also revealed that she chose to work as a school nurse as it allows her to indulge in her interest in observing the sufferings of children close up.

=== Class Cards ===
Rider (ライダー, Raidā)
Voiced by: Yū Asakawa (Japanese); Renita Salinas (English)

Caster (キャスター, Kyasutā)
Voiced by: Atsuko Tanaka (Japanese); Allison Sumrall (English)

Saber (セイバー, Seibā)
Voiced by: Ayako Kawasumi (Japanese); Elise Moore (English)

Assassin (アサシン, Asashin)
Voiced by: Akina Abe, Kazunori Nomata, Naoya Nosaka

Berserker (バーサーカー, Bāsākā)
Voiced by: Tadahisa Saizen (Japanese); John Swasey (English)

Gilgamesh (ギルガメッシュ, Girugamesshu)
Voiced by: Aya Endo (Child), Tomokazu Seki (Shadow Form) (Japanese); Chelsea Ryan McCurdy (Child) (English)
Gilgamesh is the eighth Class Card that was discovered by Rin after she investigated Fuyuki's Earth Pulses. Though he initially appears mindless and covered in a malignant black fog, he is fully capable of using his entire arsenal of weapons against his opponents. After defeating Bazett and Chloe, he escapes from the mirrored world of the Class Cards and completes a ritual allowing him to separate into two forms: a child version of himself and a gigantic black being that has access to most of Gilgamesh's noble phantasms and desires to win the Holy Grail War. Despite having no intention of winning, he allows himself to merge partly with the black being as he recognizes Illya is a worthy adversary after she combines both Kaleidosticks to become Kaleido Liner Zwei. He is ultimately defeated after a clash of strength between Illya's Kaleido Liner Zwei and his Enuma Elish.

=== Ainsworth family ===
Darius Ainsworth (ダリウス・エインズワース, Dariusu Einzuwāsu)
Voiced by: Katsuyuki Konishi
The first head of the Ainsworth family 1000 years ago, Darius escaped death by possessing his descendants. During his first life after a bout of adventuring, he met Pandora, whereupon she told him a horrible truth of their world: it was slowly dying, with mana across the planet slowly but surely depleting and being replaced with something toxic to life. Shook by this revelation, Darius set out with Pandora to overcome this crisis using Pandora's Box, hoping to transform mankind into an existence that could survive the mana depletion.
Julian Ainsworth (ジュリアン・エインズワース, Jurian Einzuwāsu)
Voiced by: Natsuki Hanae
Current head of the Ainsworth family and descendant of Darius. He first appears after Darius's spell on him is broken, and is a former classmate of Shirou.
Erica Ainsworth (エリカ・エインズワース, Erika Einzuwāsu)
Voiced by: Sumire Morohoshi
Her real identity is Pandora, the first woman created by the Olympians. In this alternate universe, she never opened Pandora's box and thus became unable to die since her death was also contained inside the box, and eventually became unable to open it. Pandora was eventually found by Darius and has lived with the Ainsworth since then, taking various names over the generations, the most recent being Erika.
Beatrice Flowerchild (ベアトリス・フラワーチャイルド, Beatorisu Furawāchairudo)
Voiced by: Rie Kugimiya
She is Julian's childhood friend, knowing him since elementary school. After being rescued by Julian when she was being bullied by boys of their school because of her red hair, she fell in love with him and gained more self-confidence. At a certain point in time she died in front of him, by being trapped beneath scrap and debris. Her soul was then put into a Doll body.
Angelica Ainsworth (アンジェリカ・エインズワース, Anjerika Einzuwāsu)
Voiced by: Ryoko Shiraishi
Angelica was born in the Ainsworth family and the eldest sister of Julian. At the end of the Fourth Ainsworth Holy Grail War, she died and her soul was later put into a Doll.

=== Others ===
Bazett Fraga McRemitz (バゼット・フラガ・マクレミッツ, Bazetto Furaga Makuremittsu)
Voiced by: Hitomi Nabatame (Japanese); Kaytha Coker (English)
A First-Rank Combat Specialist: Sealing Designation Enforcer from the Magic's Association, sent to retrieve the Class Cards from Illya and Miyu, with force if necessary. She is skilled enough to overpower Rin, Luvia, and Chloe, and nearly defeats Illya and Miyu when they utilize the Class Cards against her. She is relentless with her mission, eventually forcing Rin to announce the existence of a previously unknown eighth Servant card to stop Bazett's assault and bring about a truce. Upon her retreat, Bazett returns the three cards she took from Illya.
Following the incident, she went bankrupt (due to Luvia making her pay the whole cost), and works many part-time jobs, notably as the employee of Gakumazawa and mascot "Lion Go-kun" at Gakugaku Animal Land.

Gouto Gakumazawa (嶽間沢 豪兎, Gakumazawa Gōto)
Voiced by: Tomoyuki Shimura
Tatsuko's father. He is the only member in Gakumazawa family who has no blonde hair. He is the head of Gakumazawa Dojo, a fighting school that teaches the arts of countering (and nothing else). He loses easily, as seen when Luvia and Nanaki defeats him in two different occasions. He hires Bazett after the later went bankrupt following her assault on Edelfelt's mansion. After Nanaki defeated him and took the dojo plaque, he changes the dojo name from "嶽間沢" dojo to "GKMZW".

Stella Gakumazawa (嶽間沢 ステラ, Gakumazawa Stella)
Voiced by: Yumeha Kouda
Tatsuko's mother, from whom her children inherited their blonde hair.

Reiichi Gakumazawa (嶽間沢 黎一, Gakumazawa Reiichi)
Voiced by: Yoshitsugu Matsuoka
The first son of Gakumazawa family and Tatsuko's older brother with blonde hair. He seems like a cool-type person.

Gaisuke Gakumazawa (嶽間沢 凱介, Gakumazawa Gaisuke)
Voiced by: Subaru Kimura
The second son of Gakumazawa family and Tatsuko's older brother with blonde hair. He seems like a high spirited type person, just like Tatsuko.

Nanami Moriyama (森山 那奈巳, Moriyama Nanami)
Voiced by: Mikako Takahashi (Japanese); Juliet Simmons (English)
Nanaki's older sister. According to Nanaki, she is "a very kind and good natured person. F-cup." She has a crush on Shirou Emiya. Despite being very kind, she apparently is bold enough to use her innocent act in seducing Shirou, as she asks him to wipe down her body when she is having a fever. Her way of seducing Shirou makes Rin and Luvia dislikes her, and after they throw a bag of dissection frogs at her, Nanami develops a phobia of frogs, which Nanaki notes as sad because her name "巳" means "snake".

Hibari Kurihara (栗原 火雀, Kurihara Hibari)
Voiced by: Yōko Hikasa
Suzuka's older sister, and a doujin manga artist. She always forces Suzuka to do her bidding, especially helping her in drawing doujin manga when the deadline is near. She is also a fujoshi.

Auguste (オーギュスト, Ōgyusuto)
Voiced by: Tesshou Genda (Japanese); Christopher Ayres (English)
Luvia's butler, and very loyal to her. He has high combat capabilities. He acts like an overprotective father towards Shirou, who Luvia has a crush on.

Tanaka (田中)
Voiced by: Misato Fukuen
An amnesiac woman found by Illya after coming to the alternate world. She tends to forget a lot of things except for her name. However she is upbeat, cheerful, she is also considered the comic relief when she's not serious. She tends to sleep when she doesn't understand what people are trying to explain. Tanaka has the mind of a child, as stated by Illya. For some reason, Tanaka likes to wear gym clothes instead of wearing regular clothes and doesn't like Erika Ainsworth. However, during crucial moments, she will go into a trance and perform feats that cannot be classified as human such as regenerating.
Kirei Kotomine (言峰 綺礼, Kotomine Kirei)
Voiced by: Jouji Nakata
An alternate version of Kirei Kotomine from Fate/stay night, in this world he is a shell of his former self that is simply observing to witness the end of the world. He notably found a meaning to his life by owning a Ramen shop that only makes and serves mapo tofu.

== Media ==
=== Manga ===
The series, written by Hiroshi Hiroyama, was serialized in Kadokawa Shoten's Comp Ace magazine from September 2007 to November 2008. A sequel series titled Fate/kaleid liner Prisma Illya 2wei! (Fate/kaleid liner プリズマ☆イリヤ ツヴァイ！) was serialized from 2009 to 2012. A third manga series titled Fate/kaleid liner Prisma Illya 3rei!! (Fate/kaleid liner プリズマ☆イリヤ ドライ！！) began serialization in 2012. In 2010, a special chapter was serialized in Comp Ace to celebrate the magazine's fifth anniversary, featuring a crossover between Prisma Illya and Magical Girl Lyrical Nanoha.

In September 2024, Seven Seas Entertainment announced that they had licensed the first series in a single omnibus volume for English publication in February 2025.

=== Volumes ===
==== Fate/kaleid liner Prisma Illya ====
No.	Japanese release date	Japanese ISBN
1	April 24, 2008	978-4-04-715048-5
2	December 24, 2008	978-4-04-715142-0

==== Fate/kaleid liner Prisma Illya 2wei! ====
No.	Japanese release date	Japanese ISBN
1	December 22, 2009	978-4-04-715350-9
2	July 21, 2010	978-4-04-715486-5
3	January 21, 2011	978-4-04-715619-7
4	October 6, 2011	978-4-04-715799-6
5	March 22, 2012	978-4-04-120158-9

==== Fate/kaleid liner Prisma Illya 3rei!! ====
No.	Japanese release date	Japanese ISBN
1	November 17, 2012	978-4-04-120500-6
2	June 22, 2013	978-4-04-120747-5
3	July 24, 2013	978-4-04-120802-1
4	March 26, 2014	978-4-04-121022-2
5	October 25, 2014	978-4-04-102122-4
6	August 10, 2015	978-4-04-102123-1
7	March 26, 2016	978-4-04-104084-3
8	November 26, 2016	978-4-04-104688-3
9	August 25, 2017	978-4-04-106004-9
10	July 26, 2018	978-4-04-106005-6
11	May 26, 2020	978-4-04-108771-8
12	May 26, 2021	978-4-04-111490-2
13	June 24, 2022	978-4-04-112514-4
14	June 25, 2024	978-4-04-113791-8

=== Anime ===
The first season, a 10-episode anime television series adaptation by Silver Link, aired in Japan between July 13 and September 14, 2013. The series was simulcast by Crunchyroll. Episodes were streamed a week prior on Niconico. The opening theme is "Starlog" by ChouCho whilst the ending theme is "Prism Sympathy" by StylipS. The ending theme for episode 9 is "Tsunagu Kizuna - Tsutsumu Kodoku" (ツナグキズナ・ツツムコドク, Connected Bonds Seals Loneliness) by StylipS. The anime is licensed in North America by Sentai Filmworks, who released the series on Blu-ray Disc and DVD on September 2, 2014. Due to Sentai Filmworks doing the dub for Prims/Illya, many Fate characters are recasted with different voice actors.

The second season, Fate/kaleid liner Prisma Illya 2wei!, aired between July 10 and September 11, 2014. The opening theme is "Moving Soul" by Minami Kuribayashi whilst the ending theme is "Two By Two" by Yumeha Kouda.

The third season, Fate/kaleid liner Prisma Illya 2wei Herz!, aired in 2015 between July 25 and September 26. The opening theme is "Wonder Stella (ワンダーステラ)" by fhána whilst the ending theme is "Happening☆diary (ハプニング☆ダイアリー)" by Yumeha Kouda (Episode 1–5) then "Wishing Diary" (Episode 6–10), also performed by Yumeha Kouda.

The fourth season, Fate/kaleid liner Prisma Illya 3rei!!, aired between July 6, 2016, and September 21, 2016. The role of Sapphire was recast following the death of voice actress Miyu Matsuki on October 27, 2015. Yumi Kakazu was announced as the new voice of Sapphire. The opening theme is "Asterism" by ChouCho, whilst the ending theme is "WHIMSICAL WAYWARD WISH" by TECHNOBOYS PULCRAFT GREEN-FUND feat. Yumeha Kouda. The ending theme for episode nine was "Cuddle" by ChouCho.

After the Licht - The Nameless Girl film's premiere, it was announced that the series would be receiving a sequel. It was later confirmed to be a fifth and final season titled Fate/kaleid liner Prisma Illya Finale, with the main staff and cast reprising their roles. The season is set to premiere in 2027.

=== Films ===
An animated film based on the series, Fate/kaleid liner Prisma Illya: Vow in the Snow, was released on August 26, 2017. Ōnuma and Silver Link returned from the anime series to direct and produce the film, respectively. A second film adaptation of the series was announced on May 21, 2020. The film, titled Fate/kaleid liner Prisma Illya: Licht - The Nameless Girl, premiered on August 27, 2021.

=== OVA ===
An original video animation (OVA) episode was announced on December 22, 2018. Titled Fate/kaleid liner Prisma Illya: Prisma Phantasm, the OVA was screened in Japanese theaters on June 14, 2019. The main staff and cast reprised their roles.

=== Video game ===
A video game adaptation developed and published by Kadokawa Games for the Nintendo 3DS titled Prisma Illya (プリズマ☆イリヤ) has been released in Japan on July 31, 2014, with both regular and limited editions. The game covers the story from the manga and the anime series.

== Ban ==
The series is banned in Russia.
