= Mai Kadowaki =

Japanese voice actress & singer

- 門脇 舞以
- Born: September 8, 1980 (age 45); Tokyo, Japan
- Other names: Maita (舞太); Anzu Mitsu (杏子御津)
- Occupations: Voice actress; singer
- Years active: 2001–present
- Notable work: Fate as Illyasviel von Einzbern; Atelier Rorona: The Alchemist of Arland as Rorona; Day Break Illusion as Akari Taiyo; Strike Witches as Sanya V. Litvyak
- Height: 157.5 cm (5 ft 2 in)
- Children: 2

Mai Kadowaki (門脇 舞以, Kadowaki Mai; born September 8, 1980) is a Japanese voice actress and singer from Tokyo, Japan. She was previously known as 門脇舞 (pronunciation identical).

== Biography ==
She is popular as a radio actress who wears glasses. She is also known for portraying meganekko characters on a regular basis. Her nickname is 舞太 (Maita). She came up with this nickname when she was trying to register an email address and "mai" was in already in use so she opted for "maita". On January 21, 2007, she announced on her website that she will rename herself 門脇舞以, which has the same pronunciation as her previous name.

In September 2009, a crazed fan who had threatened her in a letter was arrested. The letters were sent to Kadowaki's agency. On February 26, 2013, she announced on her website that she got married. On December 1, 2013, Kadowaki announced that she gave birth to her first child.

On November 20, 2018, she announced on her blog on Saturday that she is now a "single parent". Kadowaki did not write about the specific circumstances that led to her raising her children alone. Kadowaki wrote that she and her children moved into a new home in the spring and she thanked her friends for helping with the move. She asked that her friends come and visit her family any time. She plans to continue with work as usual and is utilizing a babysitter and one of Japan's Child Family Support Centers.

== Filmography ==
=== Television animation ===
2000
Daa! Daa! Daa! (Miki Kozuki)
2003
D.N.Angel (Mari Ishii)
Popotan (Meah)
2004
This Ugly Yet Beautiful World (Mayu Yoshida)
Tactics (Mai Sazakuin)
MoonPhase (Hikaru Mido)
Hanaukyo Maid Team: La Verite (Marron)
Futakoi (Souju Shirogane)
2005
Okusama wa Maho Shojo (Fuyuki Morino)
Glass Mask (Hiroko Kusaki)
Hell Girl (Shirakawa)
Soreyuke! Gedou Otometai (Maika Hokke)
Doraemon (Nobita Nobi (young))
Pani Poni Dash! (Behoimi)
Futakoi Alternative (Souju Shirogane)
Blood+ (Javier, Kaori Kinjou, Min)
Negima! (Satomi Hakase)
Lime-iro Ryūkitan X Cross (Tsumugi Shima)
2006
Ouran High School Host Club (Hina Kamishiro)
Gift eternal rainbow (Miho)
Sasami: Magical Girls Club (Itoki)
Hell Girl Two Mirrors (Ikue Nonohara)
The Melancholy of Haruhi Suzumiya (Miyuki Enomoto)
Zegapain (Ricerca)
Tactical Roar (Esterella Jardin-Mar)
Tokimeki Memorial ~Only Love~ (Hiyokokko)
Tokko (Mikae)
Negima!? (Satomi Hakase)
Bincho-tan (Chiku-tan)
Fate/stay night (Illyasviel von Einzbern/Illya)
Yume Tsukai (Nao)
Lemon Angel Project (Miru Nagisa)
Renkin 3-kyuu Magical? Pokahn (Miyuki)
2007
Ikki Tousen: Dragon Destiny (Koumei Shokatsuryou)
Engage Planet Kiss Dum (Lyla)
Goshūshō-sama Ninomiya-kun (Mayu Tsukimura)
Kodomo no Jikan (Mimi Usa)
Zombie-Loan (Momoka Akatsuki)
Dojin Work (Mamidasu)
2008
Ikki Tousen: Great Guardians (Koumei Shokatsuryou)
Kanokon (Ren Nanao)
Shugo Chara!! Doki (Koyomi Hirano)
Strike Witches (Sanya V. Litvyak)
2009
Gokujou!! Mecha Mote Iinchou (Jewel)
2010
Amagami SS (Keiko Tanaka, Risa Kamizaki)
Ikki Tousen: Xtreme Xecutor (Koumei Shokatsuryou)
Blessing of the Campanella (Minette)
Strike Witches 2 (Sanya V. Litvyak)
2011
Infinite Stratos (Honne Nohotoke)
Fate/Zero (Illyasviel von Einzbern)
Hoshizora e Kakaru Hashi (Kasane Tōdō)
Carnival Phantasm (Illyasviel Von Einzbern)
2012
Amagami SS+ (Keiko Tanaka, Risa Kamizaki)
Koi to Senkyo to Chocolate (Isara Aomi)
Sengoku Collection (Mao)
Medaka Box (Tanzaku Aso)
2013
Infinite Stratos 2 (Honne Nohotoke)
Day Break Illusion (Akari Taiyō)
Fate/kaleid liner Prisma Illya (Illyasviel von Einzbern)
2014
Girl Friend BETA (Yuzuki Kiriyama)
Fate/kaleid liner Prisma Illya 2wei! (Illyasviel von Einzbern)
Fate/stay night: Unlimited Blade Works (Illyasviel von Einzbern)
Jinsei (Miku Mizumoto)
2015
Fate/stay night: Unlimited Blade Works 2nd Season (Illyasviel von Einzbern)
Fate/kaleid liner Prisma Illya 2wei Herz! (Illyasviel von Einzbern)
2016
Fate/kaleid liner Prisma Illya 3rei!! (Illyasviel von Einzbern)
Brave Witches (Sanya V. Litvyak) (eps. 7, 11, & 13)
2018
Today's Menu for the Emiya Family (Illyasviel von Einzbern)
2019
Strike Witches 501st Unit, Taking Off! (Sanya V. Litvyak)
2020
Overflow (Kotone Shirakawa)

=== Original video animation (OVA) ===
- Isshoni Sleeping: Sleeping with Hinako (Hinako)
- Isshoni Training: Training with Hinako (Hinako)
- Isshoni Training 026: Bathtime with Hinako & Hiyoko (Hinako)

=== Video games ===
- 100% Orange Juice (Sumika)
- Amagami (Keiko Tanaka/Risa Kamizaki)
- Atelier Rorona: The Alchemist of Arland (Rorona)
- Atelier Totori: The Adventurer of Arland (Rorona)
- Atelier Meruru: The Apprentice of Arland (Rorona)
- Atelier Lulua: The Scion of Arland (Rorona)
- Conception II: Children of the Seven Stars (Torri)
- Cross Edge (Whim, Vivi)
- Fantasista Doll Girls Royale (Mazoon) (game)
- Fate/stay night Réalta Nua (Illyasviel von Einzbern)
- Fate/tiger colosseum (Illyasviel von Einzbern)
- Fate/tiger colosseum Upper (Illyasviel von Einzbern)
- Fate/unlimited codes (Illyasviel von Einzbern)
- Fate/unlimited codes PORTABLE (Illyasviel von Einzbern)
- Fate/Grand Order (Illyasviel von Einzbern, Sitonai)
- Fire Emblem Heroes (Myrrh, Ishtar)
- Food Girls 2: Civil War (Hong)
- Genshin Impact (Yaoyao)
- Granblue Fantasy (Mahira)
- Hello,good-bye (Koharu Hiiragi)
- Hoshizora no Memoria -Eternal Heart- (Mare S. Ephemeral)
- Hoshizora no Memoria -Wish upon a Shooting Star- (Mare S. Ephemeral)
- Infinite Stratos: Archetype Breaker (Honne Nohotoke)
- Maji de Watashi ni Koi Shinasai! (Kuki Monshiro)
- Mana-Khemia 2: Ochita Gakuen to Renkinjutsushi-tachi (Whim)
- MeiQ: Labyrinth of Death (Maki)
- Nier (Emil)
- Nier: Automata (Emil)
- Phantasy Star Online 2 (Marlu)
- Renai X Royale (Komachi Nonoka)
- Shin Megami Tensei: Strange Journey Redux (2017) - Demeter
- Tales of the Tempest (Rubia Natwick)
- Tokyo Xanadu (Rem)
- Toushin Toshi Girls Gift RPG (Sakuya)

=== Theatrical animation ===
- Fate/stay night: Unlimited Blade Works, Illyasviel von Einzbern (2010)
- Negima! Anime Final, Satomi Hakase (2011)
- Strike Witches The Movie, Sanya V. Litvyak (2012)
- Fate/kaleid liner Prisma Illya: Vow in the Snow (2017) - Illyasviel von Einzbern
- Fate/stay night Heaven's Feel - I. Presage Flower (2017) - Illyasviel von Einzbern
- Fate/stay night Heaven's Feel - II. Lost Butterfly (2019) - Illyasviel von Einzbern
- Fate/stay night Heaven's Feel - III. Spring Song (2020) - Illyasviel von Einzbern
- Fate/kaleid liner Prisma Illya: Licht - The Nameless Girl (2021) - Illyasviel von Einzbern
