= Fate/kaleid liner Prisma Illya: Vow in the Snow =

Fate/Kaleid Liner Prisma Illya: Vow in the Snow
- Theatrical release poster

Japanese name
- Kanji: 劇場版Fate/kaleid liner プリズマ☆イリヤ 雪下の誓い
Transcriptions
- Revised Hepburn: Gekijō-ban Fate/kaleid liner Purizuma ☆ Iriya Sekka no Chikai
- Directed by: Shin Oonuma
- Written by: Kenji Inoue; Hazuki Minase
- Based on: Fate/kaleid liner Prisma Illya 3rei!! by Hiroshi Hiroyama and Type-Moon
- Produced by: Junichirou Tamura; Yukiko Katou
- Starring: Noriaki Sugiyama; Kaori Nazuka; Rikiya Koyama; Natsuki Hanae; Noriko Shitaya
- Cinematography: Kousuke Nakanishi
- Edited by: Kentarou Tsubone
- Music by: Tatsuya Kato; Technoboys Pulcraft Green-Fund
- Production company: Silver Link
- Distributed by: Kadokawa Animation
- Release date: August 26, 2017
- Running time: 90 minutes
- Country: Japan
- Language: Japanese
- Box office: $1,118,410

Fate/kaleid liner Prisma Illya: Vow in the Snow (Japanese: 劇場版Fate/kaleid liner プリズマ☆イリヤ 雪下の誓い, Hepburn: Gekijō-ban Fate/kaleid liner Purizuma ☆ Iriya Sekka no Chikai) (also known as Oath Under Snow) is a Japanese animated fantasy action film and a prequel to the manga Fate/kaleid liner Prisma Illya by Hiroshi Hiroyama, released on August 26, 2017. The film stars voice actors Noriaki Sugiyama, Kaori Nazuka, Rikiya Koyama, Natsuki Hanae and Noriko Shitaya. The plot follows a teenager named Shirou Emiya who becomes involved in the mage conflict known as the Fifth Holy Grail War to protect his foster sister, Miyu Satsuki, from being used as a sacrifice by the Ainsworth clan.

The film was first announced on September 21, 2016, when the finale of the anime's fourth season, Fate/kaleid liner Prisma Illya 3rei aired. Shin Oonuma and Silver Link returned from the anime series to direct and produce the film, respectively. Singer ChouCho performed two theme songs that are played in the film's ending primarily centered around Shirou's actions and his bonding with Miyu.

The film grossed $1,118,410 in Japan while the home media releases were also one of the best selling Japanese DVDs and Blu-rays by 2018. Sentai Filmworks released the film's Blu-ray in English regions during July 2020. Critical reception to the film has been positive for its handling of an alternate take of Shirou and his battles in the Grail War while also highlighting the visuals produced in general.

== Plot ==
A young Shirou Emiya and his adoptive father Kiritsugu travel to Fuyuki city in order to investigate the Sakatsuki family, who are rumored to be harboring a child with powerful magic abilities. They find and rescue Miyu from the ruins of the city, who has the power to grant wishes unconditionally, and that the storm was most likely caused when she was inadvertently exposed to humans thoughts and desires. Kiritsugu declares that he will use her power to save humanity. The Emiyas take Miyu back to their home, where Kiritsugu makes it clear to Shirou that they should only consider her a tool and not a human. Regardless, Shirou begins to bond with Miyu and Kiritsugu passes away before he can learn how to use Miyu's powers.

Five years later, Shirou is living as a regular high school student with Miyu as his adopted younger sister and attends school with his classmates Julian and Sakura. Shirou decides it is time to let Miyu experience the world outside their home, with Miyu saying she wants to see the ocean. When trying to confess his original intentions, Julian appears to finish the ritual he had started. Shirou realizes that Julian was the cause of the vortex that consumed Fuyuki and attempts to protect Miyu, but is defeated by Julian and his follower Angelica who leave him for dead while Miyu is kidnapped.

Shirou then wakes up in the care of a local priest, Kirei Kotomine. He explains that Julian is part of the Ainsworth family, an ancient family of mages who foresaw the end of humanity and sought to obtain the wish granting Holy Grail to avert it. Julian plans to use Miyu as a sacrifice to start the Fifth Grail War conflict. As he searches for Julian, Shirou is instead found by Sakura. She offers one to Shirou to give him a way to rescue Miyu, but admits that she would rather see him leave the city and not get involved in the War due to her feelings for him. They are then attacked by her older brother Shinji, who holds the Assassin Card. Sakura is killed and Shirou uses her Archer Card to empower himself and kill Shinji, who is revealed to merely be a puppet sent by Julian.

With his Archer Card, Shirou begins hunting down the other Servant Card holders and killing them, who are all revealed to be Julian's puppets as well. Kirei congratulates Shirou for winning the Fifth Grail War and directs him to an ancient cave where Miyu is being held. Shirou decides to use his wish to send Miyu to a different world where she can find happiness despite going against Kiritsugu's wishes. As the wish takes effect, Shirou confronts Angelica, the holder of the real Archer Card. Having used his Card to make his wish, Shirou is forced to fight Angelica with his own abilities. While Shirou is overpowered and defeated, he manages to buy enough time for the ritual to complete and Miyu is transported away. Miyu then wakes up in an alternate Fuyuki, now with the objective of finding the cards.

== Voice cast ==
Character	Voice actor
Shirou Emiya	Noriaki Sugiyama
Shirou Emiya	Junko Noda (young)
Miyu Sakatsuki	Kaori Nazuka
Kiritsugu Emiya	Rikiya Koyama
Julian Ainsworth	Natsuki Hanae
Sakura Matou	Noriko Shitaya
Angelica	Ryoko Shiraishi
Darius Ainsworth	Katsuyuki Konishi
Erica Ainsworth	Sumire Morohoshi
Zachary Ainsworth	Takanori Hoshino
Kirei Kotomine	Jouji Nakata
Shinji Matou	Hiroshi Kamiya
Atrum Galliasta	Jun Fukushima
Kariya Matou	Tarusuke Shingaki
Kayneth El-Melloi Archibald	Takumi Yamazaki
Illyasviel von Einzbern	Mai Kadowaki
Rin Tohsaka	Kana Ueda
Luviagelita Edelfelt	Shizuka Itō
Magical Ruby	Naoko Takano
Magical Sapphire	Yumi Kakazu

== Production ==
Fate/Kaleid Liner Prisma Illya is a spin-off manga to the visual novel Fate/stay Night written by Kinoko Nasu centered around Shirou Emiya and three parallel storylines regarding his participance in the Holy Grail War. Although the manga focuses on the title character Illya, Hiroyama wrote a series of flashbacks in Fate/kaleid liner Prisma Illya 3rei! centered around Shirou and Miyu. Already experienced in drawing Shirou before he started working on Illya's spin-off manga, Hiroyama had no problems with this version of Shirou, whom he referred to as one of the manga's protagonists due to the focus he gave him during the flashbacks about his past; Similar to the original visual novel, Hiroyama wanted to make Shirou select a route during his flashback chapters as he embarks on a quest to protect his sister, Miyu, when fighting against Shinji. The film adapts volumes 7 and 8 of 3rei!.

Hiroyama worked with the anime staff and stated that while different areas from the original story were changed, the film was faithful to the original version. Nevertheless, he refrained from revealing more about the movie to the fans. Director Shin Oonuma worked on the movie with the idea of focusing on character actions while also giving full attention to its fight scenes in order to make them highly appealing to the viewers. Shirou Emiya's actor Noriaki Sugiyama described the film as a darker take on the magical girl genre previously explored in the Illya series.

Sugiyama said that the idea of Shirou's story being explored in a film rather than a television series sounded interesting. He added "Shirou is a philanthropist in any world. He is a young boy who is wishing for the happiness of those around him, such as for Miyu and Illya." Kaori Nazuka, who plays Miyu Satsuki, said her character has a noticeable character arc in these spin-offs thanks to her growing relationship with Shirou. When asked about his favorite scene from the film, Sugiyama referred to the final scene due to Shirou's appealing display of characterization as shown by the impact of Shirou's final line to Miyu. Hiroyama felt that Shirou's voice contains in this film a bigger sense of security compared to his manga.

The film uses the theme songs "kaleidoscope" and "Usubeni no Tsuki" (薄紅の月; lit. 'The Thin Crimson Moon') by ChouCho. ChouCho made two songs that focused on the relationship between Shirou and Miyu, who are the center of the plot, describing it as heartwarming due to the close bond the siblings have. The song "Kaleidoscope" primarily focuses on Shirou's point of view when first meeting Miyu, and she becomes one of the most important people he has ever met. However, due to the film's plot, the lyrics were written to show a darker tone in regard to the development of what happens to the two siblings. While not being a song about Shirou, ChouCho states that by listening to it, viewers will find a bigger standing to the character.

=== Marketing ===
In promoting Vow in the Snow, Takashi Takeuchi drew his take on Hiroshi Hiroyama's Shirou Emiya.

The film was first announced on September 21, 2016, when the finale of the anime's fourth season, Fate/kaleid liner Prisma Illya 3rei aired; this was confirmed by the episode's end title card. On February 10, 2017, the anime's Twitter account confirmed its title as Gekijōban Fate/kaleid liner Prisma Illya: Sekka no Chikai (劇場版Fate/kaleid liner プリズマ☆イリヤ 雪下の誓い, lit. Movie Version Fate/kaleid liner Prisma Illya: Oath Under the Snow). To promote the film, Takashi Takeuchi, the original artist from the visual novel Fate/stay night, created a poster of Hiroyama's take on Shirou, which was given to viewers in Japan. Hiroyama responded to this promotion enthusiastically.

Promoting the film, the group "Cure Maid Cafe" made a store between August and September 2017, featuring items based on the characters featured in the film. Another promotion involved ramen by Moukotanmen Nakamoto inspired by the film Hiyashi Prism Ramen. The film was released in Japan on home media releases on January 31, 2018. The special exhibition was around that time where the voice actors made autographs to the fans. The special editions of the home media releases include an illustration of Shirou by Hiroyama as well as a short where Shirou and Sakura discuss the changes the film had in comparison to the original printed version. The original soundtrack was released on August 26, 2017. The film was released in English regions on July 14, 2020, as Fate/Kaleid Liner Prisma Illya: Vow in the Snow.

== Reception ==
=== Release ===
The film debuted at #1 on the mini-theater ranking in Japan during 2017 for three consecutive weeks. On its fourth week, it dropped to second behind Haikyu!! Sainō to Sense. The film grossed $1,118,410 in Japan.

Both DVDs and Blu-ray releases also had positive sales in Japan, first earning 1,258 and 10,716 sales, respectively during their debut. By the end of 2017, the limited edition Blu-ray had sold 12,939 units. In a poll by Anime!Anime!, the film ranked as the 17th best movie released in the year. The single reached the 61st spot in the Oricon charts.

=== Critical response ===
Writer Kenji Inoue said prescreenings of the movie were a success based on the response they got and urged fans to watch it. Anime Now praised the movie, enjoying the serious storyline that contrasting the more lighter stories from the spin-offs. Despite being a prequel, the writer noted the climax has enough tension to entertain the viewers who would know how it would end. Additionally, the reviewer saw Shirou as a more tragic character due to his constant losses in the movie but at the same time becomes a "fascinating and complex character" in film. Both The Fandom Post and Blu-Ray praised the film's for being easy to understand comparing Shirou's quest as an alternate take from other Fate/stay Night while giving them a sense of conclusion despite its tragedy. The sibling bond between Shirou and Miyu was also praised due to how heroic the former becomes to protect the later.

Critics also praised the character designs and fight sequences. Mantan Web in particular noted the film had a darker atmosphere when compared with the previous Prisma Illya television series and that Silver link's original scene are worth watching. Anime Tanuki approved of the film removing the distateful fanservice provided in previous works related to Illya and instead the animation takes advantages of Shirou's abilities to create impressive visuals, most notably when the protagonist starts projecting weapons. However, he still found several scenes to be static in terms of movement and music. Nevertheless, the two theme songs were praised. Blu-ray called the animation one of the films' biggest strengths and the music helps to make the scenes more appealing.
