= List of Chivalry of a Failed Knight episodes =

Chivalry of a Failed Knight
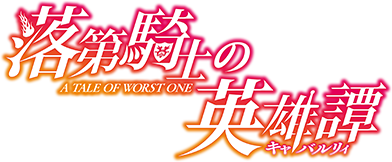
- The logo of the Anime TV series
- No. of episodes: 12

Release
- Original network: AT-X
- Original release: October 3 – December 19, 2015

Chivalry of a Failed Knight (also known as A Tale of Worst One) is an anime series adapted from the light novels of the same title by Riku Misora and Won. Produced by Silver Link and Nexus and directed by Shin Ōnuma, the series adapts the first three volumes of the light novels. The series focuses on the adventures of Hagun Academy's F-Rank Blazer Ikki Kurogane, who is challenged to a mock duel with A-Rank Blazer Stella Vermillion after he walks in on her changing in his room. After the duel, they eventually become roommates and training partners, intent on competing as Hagun's representatives in the annual Seven Star Sword Art Festival.

The series initially ran from October 3 through December 19, 2015, on AT-X in Japan and was released on DVD and Blu-ray in six compilations, each containing two episodes, by Media Factory and Frontier Works between December 25, 2015, and May 25, 2016. In September 2015, Sentai Filmworks licensed the series for an English-language digital and home media release in North America. The series was simulcast exclusively on Hulu as it aired in Japan. It was released on DVD and Blu-ray in North America on June 13, 2017.

The series uses two pieces of theme music. The opening theme, titled Identity (アイデンティティ, Aidentiti), is performed by Mikio Sakai and also serves as the ending theme for the first episode. The ending theme, used from episode 2 onwards, is "Haramitsu Renge" (波羅蜜恋華, lit. "Pāramitā Love Blossom") performed by the rock band Ali Project. The original score for the series is composed by Kōtarō Nakagawa.

== Episodes ==
No.	Title	Directed by	Written by	Storyboarded by	Original release date
1	"The Worst One I"; Transliteration: "Rakudai kishi Wan" (Japanese: 落第騎士 I)	Jin Tamamura	Shogo Yasukawa	Jin Tamamura	October 3, 2015
Just upon returning to his apartment from jogging, aspiring Mage Knight and flunking Hagun Academy student Ikki Kurogane inadvertently walks in on a half-naked girl changing in his room. While being admonished and forced to apologize by Academy Director Kurono Shinguuji, Ikki learns that the girl is Stella Vermillion, a famous A-Rank Blazer who is the princess of the Vermillion Empire and his new roommate. When Stella announces a set of house rules which Ikki objects to, Kurono has them stage a mock battle, with the loser having to obey the winner unconditionally. Ikki accepts despite the disadvantages of his low rank (i.e., being an F-rank Blazer), stating that he has to work hard in order to win the Seven Star Sword Art Festival. During the mock battle, he demonstrates powerful fighting skills and memorizes Stella's technique, which he uses against her through his technique Blade Steal. As a last resort, Stella activates her Noble Art, but Ikki counters it with his own Noble Art, outmaneuvers her attacks and strikes her, winning the battle but collapsing from exhaustion. Later, Kurono visits Stella and explains that despite Ikki's strength, he flunked the academy's evaluations due to his peculiar style. She then recommends her to follow Ikki's style so she could improve. Returning to the apartment, Stella apologizes to Ikki for her behavior. He then reminds her of the deal they made, for the loser to obey the winner from now on, and then orders her to be his roommate.
2	"The Worst One II"; Transliteration: "Rakudai kishi Tsū" (Japanese: 落第騎士 II)	Ippei Yokota	Shogo Yasukawa	Koji Sawai	October 10, 2015
Ikki's younger sister Shizuku, whom he had not seen in four years, arrives at Hagun Academy as a new student. In class, Ikki and Stella learn about the selection match for the Seven Star Sword Art Festival from their teacher, Yuri Oriki. Afterwards, they meet Shizuku, who surprises them by kissing Ikki directly on the mouth, leading to a duel between Stella and Shizuku over the former's relationship with Ikki. Shizuku tries telling Stella to stay away from her brother, inadvertently revealing that the Kurogane family treated Ikki as if he never existed. The following evening, Shizuku meets her roommate, the effeminate Nagi "Alice" Arisuin. Meanwhile, Stella asks Ikki about what Shizuku said; he explains to her that he was born without any talent in a family that produced great Blazers. As a result, he was neglected by his family and later ran away and got lost in a blizzard, but was rescued by his great-grandfather, Ryoma Kurogane, who encouraged him to believe in himself. Afterwards, he strove to become just like Ryoma and was accepted into the Academy, but when the Kurogane family discovered it, they pressured the school, which was under the previous Academy Director at the time, into creating a set of class requirements which were responsible for Ikki's failing grades until Kurono became the new Academy Director, though Kurono is also pressured as a result. Ikki then states that his constant harassment will never come to an end.
3	"The Worst One III"; Transliteration: "Rakudai kishi Surī" (Japanese: 落第騎士 III)	Shin Ōnuma, Keisuke Inoue	Shogo Yasukawa	Shin Ōnuma	October 17, 2015
After training with Ikki, Stella tries asking him out on a date, but their conversation gets interrupted by a text message sent by Shizuku, asking Ikki to go shopping with her. Stella is shocked when Ikki accepts the proposal and decides to accompany him. During the shopping trip, Ikki has an awkward first meeting with Alice, whose effeminate personality puts him off, but he later praises her for getting Shizuku to open up to other people more. The entire trip is spent with Stella and Shizuku competing to get Ikki's attention, with Shizuku seemingly triumphing every time. As the four split up to use the restrooms, the mall is suddenly taken hostage by a group of armed men led by a Blazer named Bisho, who demands a large ransom in exchange for the release of the hostages. Kurono authorizes Ikki, Stella, Shizuku and Alice to use their Devices to attack the assailants. When Stella intervenes, Bisho subdues her with his Device, Judgment Ring, and then forces her to undress in exchange for the freedom of the hostages. Shizuku takes advantage of the gunmen's distraction to protect herself, Stella and the hostages with a wall of water, while Ikki slices Bisho's left arm off to prevent him from using Judgment Ring. When the gunmen retaliate, another Blazer, Shizuya Kirihara, arrives and subdues them. Afterwards, Kirihara reveals that Ikki had a match against him but ran away, and says that he will be Ikki's first opponent.
4	"The Worst One IV"; Transliteration: "Rakudai kishi Fō" (Japanese: 落第騎士 IV)	Yoshinobu Tokumoto	Shogo Yasukawa	Yoshinobu Tokumoto	October 24, 2015
During the selection match, Stella, Shizuku, and Alice easily defeat their opponents. Meanwhile, Ikki begins studying Kirihara's Noble Art, which renders him invisible and makes it difficult to even detect him using the other senses. Ikki meets up with Alice and confides in her about his match against Kirihara: during the previous school year, when the Kurogane family still had influence over the Academy's superiors, Kirihara had been harassing him with his Device and Ikki refused to fight back, believing it would be used as an excuse to expel him. In the next day's match, Kirihara starts off by activating his Noble Art, which covers the battlefield in an illusory forest. At first, Ikki is able to deduce Kirihara's location by observing the visible arrows he fires, but Kirihara uses a new, improved technique he developed which also allows his arrows to become invisible, injuring Ikki. Kirihara ridicules Ikki by saying that he must win the Festival in order to graduate. Enraged, Stella stands up for Ikki and tells him to continue fighting. Using everything he learned about Kirihara's attacks, a rejuvenated Ikki pinpoints his location with his Noble Art and defeats him, then collapses from exhaustion. At the hospital, Ikki is met by Stella and he confesses his feelings for her. Initially embarrassed by the confession, she then kisses his cheek. The two then promise to meet and fight each other in the final match of the Festival.
5	"The Experience of the Princess"; Transliteration: "Kōjo no taiken" (Japanese: 皇女の体験)	Kazuo Nogami	Shun Kawanabe	Yuuichi Nihei	October 31, 2015
Two weeks have passed since Ikki's battle with Kirihara. Ikki has progressed through the following matches with ease, quickly losing his school nickname of "The Worst One" and gaining the new nickname of "Another One" and becoming popular with the other students, volunteering to mentor them in perfecting their strength using what he learned about swordsmanship. However, Stella becomes frustrated when Ikki isn't paying enough attention to her during the time since they became a couple. Ikki later takes her, Shizuku, Alice and his followers to the local swimming pool for more training. There, Shizuku and Alice discuss about the former's affections towards Ikki despite their biological relation. Meanwhile, after talking about her and Ikki's relationship to classmate Kagami Kusakabe, Stella and Ikki get into a fight after she reveals her misinterpretation that Ikki no longer likes her, which he quickly denies. After the two cool down and settle out their problem, Ikki suggests they both blurt out what they want to do right now with each other, and Stella agrees. When the two both want to kiss, they happily do so. On the way back, Ikki and Stella are informed that their next opponents are members from the Student Council.
6	"Sword Eater I"; Transliteration: "Kenshi koroshi Wan" (Japanese: 剣士殺し I)	Yoshinobu Tokumoto	Shun Kawanabe	Yoshinobu Tokumoto	November 7, 2015
As Ikki and Stella continue to make progress in the Selection matches, Ikki notices he is being stalked by a female student, who eventually identifies herself as Ayase Ayatsuji, the daughter of Kaito Ayatsuji, a famous swordsman. She had been hoping to ask Ikki to help her improve her swordsmanship, but was unable to approach him directly because of her fear of men (androphobia). He agrees to help her, to the surprise of both Stella and Shizuku. During training, he deduces that Ayase's problem lies in her imitation of her father's style, which is impossible to accomplish. He then proposes that since she is now fully dedicated to imitating her father's style and cannot utilize any other technique, she must adjust her position by understanding her anatomy. With this advice in mind, Ayase is able to land a hit on Ikki with ease. While accompanying Ikki and Ayase home, Stella asks Shizuku if she is jealous of Ayase, and she replies that she isn't, then hopes that Stella will always take care of Ikki and never betray him. One night, while having dinner with Ayase, Ikki and Stella meet Kuraudo Kurashiki, a Blazer who knows Ayase and despises swordsmen. He begins harassing Ayase and then injures an unresisting Ikki when he stands up for her. Afterwards, the trio is approached by Utakata Misogi and Kanata Totokubara, members of the Hagun Academy student council, who commend Ikki for not retaliating against Kuraudo. As they walk back home, Ikki and Ayase are informed that their next Festival opponents will be each other. The following night, Ikki meets up with Ayase on the school rooftop at her request.
7	"Sword Eater II"; Transliteration: "Kenshi koroshi Tsū" (Japanese: 剣士殺し II)	Yuuta Takamura	Shinichi Inotsume	Naoto Hosoda	November 14, 2015
Ayase and Ikki meet on the roof top, only for Ayase to jump off, prompting Ikki to use his Noble Art to save her. Ayase reveals that she planned to prevent Ikki from using his abilities during the match since he can only use it once every 24 hours. Now weak and exhausted, Ikki somehow makes it back to his room where Stella, who was having a perverted dream, awakens and helps Ikki. Now Ikki has to fight Ayase without his abilities and on a battle field rigged with traps that Ayase set. However, Ikki, who has learned why Ayase is so determined, still wants to help her regain her pride. Despite sustaining serious damage, Ikki is not only able to see through and defeat Ayase's technique to win, but also to break through to her and offer his help so that she could regain what she has lost.
8	"Sword Eater III"; Transliteration: "Kenshi koroshi Surī" (Japanese: 剣士殺し III)	Koji Sawai	Shinichi Inotsume	Koji Sawai	November 21, 2015
Accompanied by Stella and Ayase, Ikki goes to Ayase's family dojo and challenges Kurashiki to a duel to reclaim the dojo. As the fight progresses, Ikki takes some damage from Kurashiki's Orochimaru, reminding Ayase of her father's fight with Kurashiki, which hurts her internally. When Ayase wants to stop the fight, Stella stops Ayase, telling her that she won't be able to get the dojo back if she does, and that Ikki is actually having fun and enjoying the fight, just like her father did. Ayase then realizes that the apology her father gave at the end of the fight was to Kurashiki for not being able to execute his final move and collapsing mid-way in the match. Using Ayase's father's secret technique himself, Ikki wins the match and restores the dojo and the Ayatsuji-Itto style to Ayase. Later, Ayase confesses her foul play to the school and her father regains consciousness in the hospital.
9	"Princess Vacation"; Transliteration: "Kōjo no kyūjitsu" (Japanese: 皇女の休日)	Jimmy Stone, Yoshinobu Tokumoto	Shogo Yasukawa	Jimmy Stone	November 28, 2015
The director sends Ikki and Stella to a training camp. Stella is initially excited, believing she now gets to spend some time alone with Ikki, but it turns out they were sent to help the student council with cleaning up the training field. After cleaning, Stella insists in climbing up the mountains to view the waterfall with Ikki, despite having a fever. Caught in a sudden storm, they take refuge in an abandoned lodge and Stella's soaked clothing leads to an embarrassing situation to stripping her. Later, they're attacked by a puppet-user Blazer who controls Golems, but the attack is foiled by the student council members while Student Council President Toka Todo herself deals with the Blazer. Meanwhile, Shizuku returns to the Kurogane mansion to face her father and learns that her next opponent will be Toka Todo.
10	"Witch of the Deep Ocean vs Raikiri"; Transliteration: "Shinkai no majo VS Raikiri" (Japanese: 深海の魔女VS雷切)	Yoshinobu Tokumoto	Shun Kawanabe	Yoshinobu Tokumoto	December 5, 2015
Shizuku vs Student Council President Toka Todo. Ikki and Stella are worried because they've seen Toka's power for themselves; Shizuku is determined to win to prove that she's strong enough to stand beside her brother against everyone, especially the Kurogane family, but Toka is calm and collected. As the battle progresses, Shizuku realizes that Toka is faster and stronger than her, so she opts for a defensive weapon and long-range water/ice attacks. She covers the arena in ice to give herself a terrain advantage, but Toka is able to see through her attacks. When Toka demonstrates the ability to instantly close the gap with her Trackless Step, Shizuku fills the arena with a thick mist to use her final attack against Toka, but unfortunately loses the match to Toka's attack.
11	"Another One: Uncrowned Sword King I"; Transliteration: "Mukan no kenō Wan" (Japanese: 無冠の剣王 I)	Jun Fukuda	Shinichi Inotsume	Yuuichi Nihei	December 12, 2015
The Ethics Committee, which is controlled by the Kurogane family and Akaza creates a scandal by photographing Stella and Ikki kissing on school grounds. Ikki later gets arrested and is placed in a special prison owned by the Kurogane family, where he is continually interrogated and forced to fight the Selection matches even while being imprisoned. Despite the odds against him, Ikki continues to win his matches. During one of his hearings, he appeals to speak to his father, which to everyone's amazement is granted. However, his father tells him to quit the selection process; if Ikki wins, he would cause unrest in his father's organization by inspiring those without (magical) ability to aim higher. Ikki is distraught that his father still refuses to acknowledge him; however, Yuri Sensei slips him a lock of Stella's hair reminding him of his promise to fight Stella in the Seven Star Sword Art Festival. The Ethics Committee inform Ikki that his final opponent in the Selection Matches will be Toka Todo and if he loses, he will have to give up his dream.
12	"Another One: Uncrowned Sword King II"; Transliteration: "Mukan no kenō Tsū" (Japanese: 無冠の剣王 II)	Yoshinobu Tokumoto, Shin Ōnuma	Shogo Yasukawa	Koji Sawai	December 19, 2015
Ikki's final match, against Toka Todo, is to be televised to the whole world. Stella and Alice win their final matches and spots at the Seven Stars Battle Festival. Even though exhausted and wounded from his prior matches and ill-treatment in prison and haunted by self-doubt, Ikki arrives at the arena in time, cheered on by everyone at Hagun Academy. Toka Todo, as well as everyone else, knows that the fight is fixed but still wants to test Ikki's resolve to fight for the weak. He defeats Toka Todo, shocking Akaza. Refusing to accept the outcome of the match, Akaza tries to attack Ikki, but Stella runs to his rescue and easily knocks off Akaza along the way. As Stella is near him, he proposes to her while it was still being broadcast to the entire world. Then, the Emperor of Vermillion telephones Ikki's father and suggests that their children should not be burdened by their parents' political goals. A ceremony is held honoring the school's six representatives for the Seven Star Sword Arts Festival and Ikki is named the leader and flag-bearer by Toka Todo. Ikki is later seen talking with Stella about his proposal, but before anything can happen, Shizuku and Alice arrive. Shizuku proceeds to create new rules to teach Stella how to become a bride. But this further enrages Stella, who believes some of the rules are made up, and retaliates with her own rules.

== Home releases ==
=== Japanese release ===
Cover of the first DVD/Blu-ray volume of Chivalry of a Failed Knight as released by Kadokawa Shoten on December 25, 2015.

Kadokawa Media Factory, in partnership with Frontier Works, distributed the episodes in six volumes in DVD and Blu-Ray format across Japan.

==== DVD ====
Frontier Works and Media Factory (Japan, Region 2 DVD)
Volume	Episodes	Release date	Ref.
1	1-2	December 25, 2015	
2	3-4	January 27, 2016	
3	5-6	February 24, 2016	
4	7-8	March 23, 2016	
5	9-10	April 27, 2016	
6	11-12	May 25, 2016	

==== Blu-ray ====
Frontier Works and Media Factory (Japan, Region A Blu-ray)
Volume	Episodes	Release date	Ref.
1	1-2	December 25, 2015	
2	3-4	January 27, 2016	
3	5-6	February 24, 2016	
4	7-8	March 23, 2016	
5	9-10	April 27, 2016	
6	11-12	May 25, 2016	
