= Final Fantasy Lost Stranger =

Japanese manga series

- First tankōbon volume cover
- Genre: Adventure; Isekai; Sword and sorcery
- Manga
- Written by: Hazuki Minase
- Illustrated by: Itsuki Kameya
- Published by: Square Enix
- English publisher: NA: Yen Press
- Magazine: Monthly Shōnen Gangan
- Original run: July 12, 2017 – present
- Volumes: 15

Final Fantasy Lost Stranger (Note: Japanese: ファイナルファンタジー ロスト・ストレンジャー, Hepburn: Fainaru Fantajī Rosuto Sutorenjā) is a Japanese manga series written by Hazuki Minase and illustrated by Itsuki Kameya. It began serialization in Square Enix's shōnen manga magazine Monthly Shōnen Gangan in July 2017. The series features an original story set in the world of Final Fantasy.

== Synopsis ==
The series focuses on Square Enix employee Shogo Sasaki, who has been a fan of Final Fantasy since his childhood and dreams of one day making his own game in the franchise. One day, he and his sister Yuko were killed in a collision with a truck. They later woke up in another world reminiscent of that of Final Fantasy.

== Production ==
Final Fantasy Lost Stranger is written by Hazuki Minase and illustrated by Itsuki Kameya and is based on the Final Fantasy video game franchise from Square Enix. The manga was announced during the 30th anniversary of the series as an original story combining elements from the Final Fantasy universe with the popular isekai genre. Minase previously wrote the light novel series C³ and penned scripts for the Fate/kaleid liner Prisma Illya television adaptations. Kameya previously authored the manga Kaidan Tochuu no Big Noise and was an illustrator on the mobile game Star Ocean: Anamnesis, also published by Square Enix. She was told about her former managing editor about a contest held by Square Enix to illustrate for the new manga. Kameya is large fan of the games with her favorites being Final Fantasy V, VII and X. Kameya entered the competition and won first place.

The monthly production of Lost Stranger involves Minase and Kameya working remotely from one another with their managing editor acting as a liaison. Dropbox and Skype are used for their communication. Minase sends the script to the editor who next forwards it to Kameya. The artist then drafts storyboards and adds its manga elements for about ten days. After ensuring the story looks proper in manga format, Kameya corresponds with the editor until it is delivered back to Minase. If the writers agrees, the work is put through a validation process by Naoki Yoshida and other staff at Square Enix for about five days before Kameya then finalizes it at the end of the month.

According to Kameya, most of her storyboards are accepted by Yoshida, but he will sometimes ask her to specify certain elements for readers who may be unfamiliar with the games. Kameya largely has free rein on the character designs, although the publisher has requested she revise some of them. She largely completes the designs herself and delegates the drawing to assistants. She references Final Fantasy XIV for monster designs and to ensure character jobs have the appropriate equipment and costumes. Kameya stated that the manga's protagonist Shogo is based on the default male Hyur avatar from Final Fantasy XIV to make him more identifiable to readers. She has used the manga Fullmetal Alchemist as a reference for both character and set designs as well as for alternating between serious and comedic tones in Lost Stranger. Other sources of inspiration outside the franchise include Czech artist Alphonse Mucha, natural landscapes, and European cities such as Paris. She exclusively utilizes digital tools, notably Clip Studio Paint, for both black-and-white and color illustrations.

== Publication ==
Final Fantasy Lost Stranger was first announced during the 30th anniversary event of the Final Fantasy franchise on January 31, 2017. The series was announced to be the first manga of the franchise to have an original story not connected to previous games. It began serialization in Square Enix's shōnen manga magazine Monthly Shōnen Gangan on July 12, 2017. Its chapters have been compiled into fiffteen tankōbon volumes as of November 2026.

During Anime Expo 2017, Yen Press announced at their panel that they would begin simultaneously publishing its chapters in English. Crunchyroll later announced at their panel that they would also begin simultaneously publishing its chapters in English.

No.	Original release date	Original ISBN	North American release date	North American ISBN
1	November 22, 2017	978-4-7575-5520-4	August 28, 2018	978-1-9753-8090-8
1. "Prelude-Rebirth"; 2. "Defiers of Fate"; 3. "Challenge"
2	May 22, 2018	978-4-7575-5719-2	March 5, 2019	978-1-9753-0307-5
4. "Calamity Unbound"; 5. "Decision on the Dock"; 6. "You're Not Alone"; 7. "In Search of Light"; 8. "Devil's Ambition"
3	January 22, 2019	978-4-7575-5975-2	September 3, 2019	978-1-9753-8498-2
9. "Beyond the Darkness"; 10. "The Darkness of Eternity"; 11. "Movement in Green"; 12. "The Day Will Come"; 13. "Dancing Calcabrina"
4	June 12, 2019	978-4-7575-6155-7	January 28, 2020	978-1-9753-3293-8
14. "A Fleeting Dream"; 15. "The Prelude of Empty Skies"; 16. "Setting You Free"; 17. "Torn from the Heavens"; 18. "Out of the Frying Pan"
5	January 11, 2020	978-4-7575-6463-3	November 3, 2020	978-1-9753-1679-2
19. "Promised Eternity"; 20. "Behind the Door"; 21. "Something Burns in the Heart"; 22. "A Place to Call Home"; 23. "Open Your Heart"
6	November 12, 2020	978-4-7575-6891-4	December 7, 2021	978-1-9753-3575-5
24. "Seeking Power"; 25. "Requiem"; 26. "Lifestream"; 27. "Utakata"; 28. "Sinful Hope"
7	May 12, 2021	978-4-7575-7149-5	May 24, 2022	978-1-9753-4481-8
29. "Invincible"; 30. "Broken Spell, Healed Hearts"; 31. "Awakening"; 32. "Bibliophilia"; 33. "A Thousand Screams"; 34. "Wandering"
8	December 12, 2021	978-4-7575-7624-7	February 21, 2023	978-1-9753-6125-9
35. "Conflagration"; 36. "No Sound, No Scutter"; 37. "Unknown Lands"; 38. "Wizardly"
9	July 12, 2022	978-4-7575-8025-1	July 18, 2023	978-1-9753-7159-3
39. "This Is Your Story"; 40. "Let the Battles Begin!"; 41. "Something to Protect"; 42. "Funk with Me"; 43. "Chamber of a Thousand Faces"
10	March 10, 2023	978-4-7575-8466-2	October 15, 2024	979-8-8554-0211-7
44. "Dark Vows"; 45. "Fracture"; 46. "The Unforgiven"; 47. "Overture"; 48. "Melody of Anguish"
11	January 12, 2024	978-4-7575-9002-1	December 24, 2024	979-8-8554-0213-1
49. "From the Depths"; 50. "Darkness Ahead"; 51. "Smash 'Em, Rip 'Em"; 52. "Anxiety"; 53. "Unworthy"; 54. "Feast of Betrayal"
12	November 12, 2024	978-4-7575-9510-1	September 23, 2025	979-8-8554-2049-4
55. "The Maker's Ruin"; 56. "Pursuit"; 57. "Shining Beacon of Civilization"; 58. "Thunder Rolls"; 59. "A Reason to Live"; 60. "The Iron Beast"; 61. "The Dark's Embrace"
13	August 8, 2025	978-4-301-00002-0	August 25, 2026	979-8-8554-3604-4
62. "Battle at the Big Bridge"; 63. "Reign of Pain"; 64. "Floundering in the Depths"; 65. "Desert Wasteland"; 66. "The Gold Saucer"; 67. "The Tug of Fate"
14	May 12, 2026	978-4-301-00516-2	—	—
15	November 12, 2026	978-4-301-00807-1	—	—

== See also ==
- C3, a light novel series also written by Hazuki Minase
