= The Ones Within =

Japanese manga and anime series

- Cover of the first Naka no Hito Genome [Jikkyōchū] manga volume

ナカノヒトゲノム【実況中】 (Naka no Hito Genome [Jikkyōchū])
- Genre: Mystery
- Manga
- Written by: Osora
- Published by: Media Factory
- Imprint: MFC Gene Pixiv Series
- Magazine: pixiv Comic
- Original run: 2014 – present
- Volumes: 10
- Anime television series
- Directed by: Shin Oonuma
- Produced by: Mitsuhiro Ogata; Terushige Yoshie; Yutaka Kashiwagi; Yukiko Katou; Daisuke Iwasaki; Junichirou Tamura; Chen Yiyi; Norio Fukui; Shuuzou Kasahara; Tsuyoshi Katou; Yang Guoxiang
- Written by: Kento Shimoyama
- Music by: Junichi Satou
- Studio: Silver Link
- Licensed by: Crunchyroll: SEA: Muse Communication
- Original network: AT-X, Tokyo MX, KBS, SUN, BS11, TVA
- Original run: July 7, 2019 – September 22, 2019
- Episodes: 12 + OVA
- icon

The Ones Within (ナカノヒトゲノム【実況中】, Naka no Hito Genome [Jikkyōchū]; lit. 'The Ones Within [Now Streaming]') is a Japanese manga series by Osora, serialized online via pixiv Comic website since 2014. It has been collected in ten tankōbon volumes by Media Factory. An anime television series adaptation produced by Silver Link aired from July 7 to September 22, 2019.

== Synopsis ==
A series of strange disappearances have been occurring throughout Japan, and despite the police's efforts, no leads have been found apart from the fact that all of the victims were youths. Akatsuki Iride, a friendly and amicable teenage boy, is a popular uploader of "Let's Play" videos, one of his latest uploads consisting of an F2P game called "The Ones Within - Genome". Although online rumors claim that the game causes anyone who clears it to disappear, Akatsuki is wholly unaware until the rumors prove true. He is summoned to a completely different world, and meets other teenagers like him: Karin Sarayashiki, Kaikoku Onigasaki, Himiko Inaba, Anya Kudou, Yuzu Roromori, Zakuro Oshigiri and Makino Aikawa. The eight teenagers are welcomed into what is known as the 13th Avenue, headed over by a strange man with an alpaca mask calling himself "Paca", and are informed of their task: to work together in clearing stages of the game and retrieving the "chromosome", a keycard-like token of completion, to subsequently reach 100 million viewers in this livestream where death and injury can all occur. Resistance is not tolerated; those who do are imprisoned in what is known as the "White Room" to wait alone for the rest in the Avenue to complete the game. Henceforth begins their trials in clearing this game, but what lies in wait for them is not only dangerous obstacles, with each member having a hidden past and dark secrets of their own.

== Characters ==
=== 13th Avenue ===
Akatsuki Iride (入出 アカツキ, Iride Akatsuki)
Voiced by: Daiki Yamashita (Japanese); Justin Briner (English)
A friendly and optimistic let's player specializing in escape games and the main protagonist of the story. He was raised by his aunt as her son after the former went delusional from the original Akatsuki's death as a child. Before being adopted, his original name was Akira. Despite his positive demeanour he possesses a uniquely perceptive and honest side, which allows him to befriend almost anyone. Prior to the series, he had met Yuzu online and planned to collaborate with her on a game broadcast.
His identity as the owner of the island where the game takes place is later revealed in the story, as his adoptive father had passed it to him via inheritance after death, although this is kept a secret.
Karin Sarayashiki (更屋敷 カリン, Sarayashiki Karin)
Voiced by: Akari Kitō (Japanese); Kristi Rothrock (English)
A beautiful and popular horror-game streamer hailed as the #1 Female Game Streamer People Want to be Stepped on by online, known as "the Cursed Princess". Despite coming across as initially aggressive and confrontational, she is actually easily scared despite being an avid player of horror games, and can be sensitive and caring to her friends. She becomes Yuzu's best female friend.
As a child, Karin had an older brother who ran away after their parents placed too much expectation and responsibility on him, leaving to pursue his own dreams. This led to their parents putting all these expectations on Karin instead, which made her resent her brother and despise reality.
Kaikoku Onigasaki (鬼ヶ崎 カイコク, Onigasaki Kaikoku)
Voiced by: Takuya Satō (Japanese); Aaron Campbell (English)
A Sengoku-period and Japanese-style game uploader. Characterised as a laid-back and calm person, he is extremely capable when the need arises and has high responsiveness, making him the most cut-out for unexpected situations. As the heir to the Onigasaki clan his grandfather placed extreme pressure and expectations on him, treating him like a doll and causing him to disown his family, running away from home and turning to games to relieve his emotions. He almost always wears Japanese-style clothing and fights with an old-fashioned umbrella and a katana.
Anya Kudō (駆堂 アンヤ, Kudō Anya)
Voiced by: Tasuku Hatanaka (Japanese); Travis Mullenix (English)
A fighter-game uploader, which suits his often angry, distrustful and violent attitude. This attitude partially stems from the deaths of his parents and a sleep disorder which gives him regular periods of insomnia, causing him to have to take sleeping pills most of the time and take up game streaming to get rid of boredom during the night. He eventually befriends Akatsuki, but quarrels a lot with Zakuro throughout the series.
Anya was the youngest of three brothers until his oldest brother Kenya died after falling asleep from their family's sleep disorder on his motorcycle. Not long after, Anya was also diagnosed with the same disorder, leading to the second brother Shinya to aspire to become a doctor and develop a cure. Anya keeps his brother's motorcycle helmet around his neck as a memento.
Zakuro Oshigiri (忍霧 ザクロ, Oshigiri Zakuro)
Voiced by: Koki Uchiyama (Japanese); Stephen Fu (English)
A stealth-type game uploader, characterised by his masked mouth and ability to conceal his presence well even in real life. He is often stoic, but harbours a shy side especially around women, which makes him a target of Yuzu's teasing. He entered the game in order to find his younger twin sister Sakura after she disappeared under similar circumstances. He has trouble working with Anya and keeps a dagger in his jacket for self-defense.
Himiko Inaba (伊奈葉ヒミコ, Inaba Himiko)
Voiced by: Manaka Iwami (Japanese); Kate Bristol (English)
A timid and kind nurturing-simulation game streamer who often helps out with domestic chores during emergencies. She carries flash grenades around for self-defense. Her older brother was put up for adoption by her parents and later went missing long enough to be declared legally deceased. Her parents claimed they did this to protect her which lead her to believe that she had indirectly killed him.
Yuzu Roromori (路々森ユズ, Roromori Yuzu)
Voiced by: Kaori Nazuka (Japanese); Marissa Lenti (English)
A cheerful puzzle-and-maze-game streamer that enjoys teasing her teammates, especially Karin. She met Akatsuki online before and the two were planning to do a collaboration together before entering the game. Underneath her ditzy and sarcastic personality though, she harbours a genius-like intellect and an unhealthy obsession with Akatsuki.
Makino Aikawa (逢河マキノ, Aikawa Makino)
Voiced by: Takuma Terashima (Japanese); Mark Allen Jr. (English)
A quiet and handsome love-game streamer who sleeps almost all the time and lets his eyes do most of the talking for him. When he was a child, he was never loved by his parents and fell in love with the girl next door who took care of him for a long time, but his hopes were dashed when the girl, who never knew of his true feelings, got a boyfriend herself. This led him to turn to love games for comfort and shut himself in his own world. Later, Akatsuki helps get him back on his feet and move on. A running gag in the series is how anyone, male or female, who looks into his eyes for five seconds can be charmed by him.
Paka (パカ)
Voiced by: Kenjiro Tsuda (Japanese); Ben Phillips (English)
The mysterious game master of The Ones Within - Genome. He hides his face behind an alpaca mask. Despite his jovial and light-hearted personality, he can show a darker and more serious side whenever he faces opposition from any of the players.

=== Other characters ===
Kenya Kudō (ケニア工藤)
Voiced by: Orion Pitts
He was the elder brother of both Anya and Shinra. Kenya was going to get chocolate for his brothers but Kenya died in a car crash after falling asleep from their family's sleep disorder on his motorcycle and his younger brother Anya keeps his motorcycle helmet around his neck as a memento.

== Media ==
=== Manga ===
No.	Release date	ISBN
1	June 27, 2015	978-4-04-067642-5
2	October 27, 2015	978-4-04-067901-3
3	April 27, 2016	978-4-04-068195-5
4	October 27, 2016	978-4-04-068682-0
5	April 27, 2017	978-4-04-069160-2
6	November 27, 2017	978-4-04-069476-4
7	May 26, 2018	978-4-04-069872-4
8	November 26, 2018	978-4-04-065253-5
9	June 27, 2019	978-4-04-065781-3
10	February 27, 2020	978-4-04-064247-5; 978-4-04-064248-2 (SP)

=== Anime ===
An anime adaptation was announced via the manga's official Twitter account on May 23, 2018, later revealed to be a television series on September 13, 2018. The series is directed by Shin Oonuma and animated by Silver Link, with Kento Shimoyama written the scripts, Mizuki Takahashi designed the characters, and Junichi Satou of Fhána composed the music at Lantis. It aired from July 7 to September 22, 2019, on AT-X, Tokyo MX, KBS, SUN, BS11, and TVA. Anya's Japanese voice actor, Tasuku Hatanaka, performed the series' opening theme song "not GAME", while Fhána performed the series' ending theme song "Boku wo Mitsukete" (僕を見つけて). Funimation has licensed the series out Asia for a simuldub, while Muse Communication holds the rights to the series in Southeast Asia. The series ran for 12 episodes. An original video animation was announced and bundled with the manga's 10th volume which was released on February 27, 2020.

No.	Title	Original release date
1	"Are We Friends"	July 7, 2019
Teen online game streamer Akatsuki Iride receives an invitation to participate in a special stage of an infamous video game The Ones Within – Genome, known for causing its players to disappear. He is suddenly transported to a remote forest alongside fellow players Karin Sarayashiki and Kaikoku Onigasaki. While searching for a way out, they are suddenly pursued by an enormous panda, which Akatsuki manages to befriend due to his friendly nature and convince it to leave peacefully, much to the amusement of game master Paca, a mysterious man in a suit with an alpaca mask. They are subsequently brought to the Genome Tower, and introduced to five other participants, Anya Kudou, Zakuro Oshigiri, Himiko Inaba, Yuzu Roromori and Makino Aikawa, all of them online game streamers that received the invitation and wound up here. Paca explains that all of them have been chosen as active players in the game, and are being broadcast live 24/7 in order to attain 100 million views of their gameplays, lest they will spend permanent imprisonment in a White Room of endless waiting that would drive anyone insane. Akatsuki, Karin, Zakuro and Anya are tasked with completing a ouija board game by fulfilling its three wishes for their second stage after fleeing the panda, and retrieve a "chromosome" as proof of their completion. The first is for water, the second for a friend, which Akatsuki offers to be, and the final wish is him. The ouija board attempts to kill him, first by dragging him down the window where he is saved by the panda, and then setting the building on fire. Akatsuki promises instead to come find her after clearing the game and escapes with a few minor burns. End-of-episode view count: 000083825
2	"Born This Way"	July 14, 2019
For the third stage Paca introduces them to a nurturing-dating simulation game to raise an attractive girl from an egg to be the flawless Lady Murasaki to capture the heart of the school's prince Hikaru Genji. At the same time, he allows everyone to go freely as they please within the district, Avenue 13, except for Floor 51 and above of the Genome Tower, as trespassers will be punished. Himiko, Makino, Akatsuki and Anya are nominated to participate in this game. The first trial involves hatching and incubating the egg for an hour at a temperature of at least 38°C and appropriate humidity, which Himiko performs with ease and dedication. As the girl hatched will be determined by the breeder's preferences, Himiko urges everyone to envision their ideal type of girl, but what is birthed is a miniature version of the giant panda with a feminine attitude and afro hair. Meanwhile, Yuzu invites Karin to go to the open-air onsen with her on Floor 30 while questioning her relationship with Akatsuki and pretending to seduce her, but this was all just an act revealing that the players truly are being watched everywhere as the view counts shoot up exponentially. The broadcasting is none other than Paca-shaped winged cameras "Pacameras". Murasaki is accidentally charmed by Makino after gazing into his eyes but everyone persuades her to go to school anyway, with the girls (and Iride dressed as one) infiltrating the classroom to watch out for her. Hikaru is revealed to be an insecure teacher who uses his good looks to feed his narcissism. As Murasaki's muffin is crushed by him, she makes more and gifts them to the players instead, confessing that she loves all of them. With her love fulfilled, the players earn the second chromosome. After the stage, Yuzu returns to her room and opens a closet plastered with photographs of Akatsuki. End-of-episode view count: 003549352
3	"Clumsy Pretender"	July 21, 2019
Kaikoku and Zakuro reveal that while the others were playing Stage 3, the two of them snuck to Floor 51 after discovering that the entire city is completely vacant save for the players. However, as they were found out, Paca sets an S-level difficulty stage for them to conquer next as punishment, called "Exterminate the Mimicry Man-eaters" and sealing them within the Genome Tower. As the first Mimicry Man-eater appears in their room, it splits the group into two, with plans to regroup and meet at the basement food storage room. The monsters multiply extensively in their chase, frequently imitating the appearance of their comrades to fool them, but the group successfully manages to meet as the sun sets. Akatsuki reveals that the Mimicry Man-eaters operate based on sunlight and due to night falling, are currently inactive, allowing Yuzu to arrive with a bunch of countermeasures. Yuzu digs out a bag of poisoned needles and hands them out to the boys to kill the monsters the next sunset, while leaving the girls and Makino behind to protect their food source. In her room, Kaikoku finds her closet of Akatsuki pictures and begins to suspect that not all the players are allies. As the sun sets on their second day of Stage 4, there are five vials left. Akatsuki accompanies Karin to use the toilet at night but leaves halfway to use the men's restroom. There, he is confronted by Yuzu, who reveals her startling knowledge of Akatsuki's habits after dedicating her whole life to observing him. She identifies him as the control of the Mimicry Man-eaters and killing him. After the stage is cleared, the real Akatsuki, having learned about Anya's sleep disorder (causes periods of insomnia until he collapses from exhaustion), gets a bottle of sleeping pills from Paca, only for Anya to punch him in the face. End-of-episode view count: 007265098
4	"Daydream and Nightmare"	July 28, 2019
Anya, annoyed Akatsuki asked Paca for sleeping pills, punches him and begins to isolate himself, feeling as though he is a burden and unused to being helped. The two make up soon after, with Anya indirectly apologizing and confessing that he wasn't really angry, but grateful. The players proceed to Stage 5, which takes place in Kakuriyo, the land of the demons. Paca tasks them with saving the girls kidnapped by a race of invincible oni. The players visit the village elder Kihachi and his granddaughter Kikka, who give Yuzu the idea of having Makino and Akatsuki pose as female sacrifices, relying on the power of Makino's eyes to charm anyone regardless of gender. However the plan goes awry when Makino falls asleep and Karin is kidnapped instead by Kikka and the elder, revealed to be the oni themselves. As Karin is captured, Akatsuki negotiates with the elder and offers to go with him willingly, and should he be unwanted Kikka is free to dispose of him. As the other players lament their situation, Yuzu reveals that she placed a transmitter in the Akatsuki's lanyard, and promises to track them down and save everyone. End-of-episode view count: 011926340
5	"Dusk and Dawn"	August 4, 2019
A flashback shows that Kaikoku was treated like a tool by his grandfather back at the Onigasaki house due to being the next heir, causing him to rebel and run away from home. In the present, Iride and Karin are held in a cage at the oni's mansion. Iride manages to slip through the bars, but Karin is left behind and turned into one of Kikka's maids for her life-sized dollhouse, named Veronica. He crawls through the ceiling vents and manages to meet with Zakuro and Kaikoku, who have come for the kidnapped girls and Karin. The three split up to the three towers of the mansion to find the trapped girls, which Iride discovers first and heads back into the room he was initially caught to find the key. However, he is severely injured by Kihachi until Paca arrives to stop him, reminding Kihachi of his existence as a mere game character and stressing Iride's importance to the game, although this is unexplained. Iride offers to be friends with Paca and escape this place with him but Paca rejects him, saying that he is bound to a promise and causing Iride to cry. Meanwhile, Zakuro finds a player bracelet with his twin sister Sakura's name on it, causing him to go into a panic. The three boys meet up back at the underground dungeon to free the captured girls and Karin. As Kikka appears, Zakuro attempts to question her but she lies that she got rid of Sakura, causing him to go into a rage until Kaikoku steps in and threatens Kikka. With Kihachi no longer responding to her calls, she confesses that she really cannot remember a girl resembling Zakuro from two years ago. As Kaikoku leaves however, she taunts him for being jealous of her close relationship with her grandfather. Meanwhile, back at the Genome Tower, Yuzu watches footage of Iride's every move from a Pacamera. End-of-episode view count: 018700780
6	"Erase My Reality"	August 11, 2019
Stage 6 moves to the isolated ruins of Karakara Desert, where a girl and a boy must proceed through the dungeon and retrieve the fifth chromosome from the guardian of the temple. However, the catch is that players must not lie no matter what. By drawing lots, Anya and Himiko are chosen, much to her fear and horror. As they make their way through the ruins, Himiko tries to strike up conversation, asking him if he has been sleeping well and taking his medicine properly, but Anya lies to her. This causes mummies to emerge and attack them. Himiko uses her flash grenades to break through as Anya fends off the remaining mummies with a steel pipe, emerging into a crumbling bridge. However, one grabs the motorcycle helmet Anya has on his neck, nearly strangling him until he unclips the helmet and defeats the mummy. Himiko makes a grab for it and Anya tries to pull her up, but the two fall down into the abyss when the bridge crumbles. Outside the temple, the rest of the members relax with cool drinks due to the heat and having nothing to do, wherein Paca reveals that he suffered from burns all over his body years ago, hence he cannot expose any skin. Hidden in the trees away from the others, Kaikoku confides in Zakuro about his suspicions regarding Iride and Yuzu. Zakuro is further shaken when Paca warns him how Kaikoku is first in line for the White Room. In the abyss, Anya wakes up from a dream when his oldest brother Kenya died in a car accident after going out to buy ice-cream for him. The two unexpectedly find the guardian, an alpaca design carved into the wall, who requests that they answer 3 questions without lying. It begins with their first love, and is followed by five good things about the person they rely on the most (Iride), which the guardian has manifest through a slime medium. The final question: confession, asks them to name their sin, to which Himiko admits that she killed her older brother. Later, Iride muses how he wants to collect all the chromosomes, and Yuzu tells him that this dungeon is unsuitable for him. End-of-episode view count: 025028037
7	"Footsteps Outside"	August 18, 2019
Anya recalls Himiko explaining how her parents attempted to protect her and gave up her brother for adoption. He subsequently went missing for 7 years and was declared dead officially, causing Himiko to lament why her parents wanted to save only her. Stage 7 escalates quickly into a game of hide-and-seek with "the three Curse-stealing Sisters" Misery, Isabella and Carrie, tall monstrous triplets with an eyepatch each that operate based on a bell rung every 15 minutes. Paca limits the game area to their unlocked rooms and corridors of Floor 6 and explains the rules: if a person is caught once, his/her vision will be stolen, but if the person is caught twice, his/her eyeballs will be next. The only way to remove the first curse is by touching someone that hasn't been cursed, and the aim of the game is to have nobody remaining that is cursed after an hour. The first round proceeds with the three girls, Kaikoku and Zakuro being cursed after two rooms were opened, meaning that the 3/8 probability has a low chance of succeeding unless all of them manage to receive help immediately after being cursed. The second round returns with all of them deciding to split up. When Kaikoku hides in Yuzu's room, he finds a strange photo of a man and woman resembling Iride and Yuzu wearing lab coats, but with their faces scribbled out, as well as a suspicious stack of research papers titled "Experiment Data on District 13". As Anya and Iride are cursed this time, Iride attempts to leave to find someone pure but realises that Carrie is waiting outside and blocking the door. This forces the two boys to hide in the same room despite being already cursed once, escaping a close call by switching hiding spots from inside the wardrobe to behind its doors. The final round has them on a gamble as everyone stays in the same room, with Iride promising them that the sisters won't come. Everyone clears the stage without being cursed. End-of-episode view count: 036072871
8	"Glimpse of Adulthood"	August 25, 2019
After the stressful Stage 7, Paca allows the players to take a day off and recommends the open-air hot spring on the 30th floor of the Genome Tower. When the boys head together though, they find Paca bathing there in a suit and promptly kick him out. This prompts Paca to switch the wooden signs of the men's bath and the women's bath on the doors in retaliation, causing Karin and Yuzu to enter the men's bath instead believing that it is for females. Yuzu notices the boys' presences behind a large rock due to the water movements, but declines to tell Karin about it. The boys frantically attempt to arrive at countermeasures but inevitably cause a ruckus and making themselves found by Karin, who promptly beats them up. Himiko stumbles on the scene and breaks up the fight using her flash grenades, which much to Paca's glee, causes the view counts to shoot up exponentially. That night, everyone is in bed for a good rest while Kaikoku scans through the data files on each of the players he stole from Yuzu's room, with only two files of Iride and Yuzu that are missing. Surprised at how detailed the information is, he finds a note detailing how his grandfather is on his deathbed and heads up the levels of the Genome Tower angrily with a sword in hand. The next morning, Zakuro is shocked to find that Kaikoku has disappeared, having been admitted to the White Room. End-of-episode view count: 041885922
9	"Heaven White and Hell Black"	September 1, 2019
Paca brings Kaikoku his breakfast the next morning, advising him to eat after the anaesthetic administered to him has worn off. Paca also explains that he has to now wait for his friends in this room alone until they reach 100 million views, with a newly added player bracelet on his wrist to makes things easier for the workers here should he die. In retaliation, Kaikoku bites Paca's hand. When Paca returns to the Genome Tower the rest of the players announce that they are going on strike and refuse to participate in any games until Kaikoku is returned to them. Zakuro asks if Iride is on their side, to which Iride promises that all eight of them will be back together again. To give everyone a chance to redeem the prisoner, Paca offers them a 72-hour puzzle game for Stage 8 with 30001 pieces. In finding the piece that does not belong, they will hence earn the password combination to the White Room to free Kaikoku. While explaining the rules he warns Yuzu to know her place, hinting that he picked a puzzle game on purpose to test her specialty. The players take turns napping while Yuzu insists on working non-stop on the puzzle, as her genius intellect tells her that it is impossible to make it. Karin comforts Yuzu and uses her photographic memory to help, as everyone watches on, believing in her. Meanwhile, back in the White Room, Kaikoku recognises the player bracelet to be similar to the one Zakuro found in the oni mansion, and discovers a secret tunnel beneath the bathroom tiles. He comes across a group of three players who were likewise sent to the White Room: Nanami Omejima, Chihiro Akafuda and Zakuro's sister Sakura, who managed to live and survive in this place nicknamed "the Underground". Nanami reveals to Kaikoku that the name "13th Avenue" doesn't mean that there are other places like that, rather, the name of the place is updated each time the players change. The entire game occurs on this unpopulated island where supplies and people do frequent, only that Paca hides them well. Kaikoku also discovers that while Sakura and Zakuro are twins, the two are very different in their personality, with Sakura being more outspoken and brave and preferring to work with her hands. As the two wade in the drains to find some tools, Sakura speaks about a legend where mermaid ghosts exist here, only for the water to ripple disturbingly
10	"Hold On and Let Go"	September 8, 2019
The underground drains turn out to be populated by goldfish. However, Kaikoku soon feels hair wrap around his ankles and pull him underwater, where he sees a gigantic carnivorous goldfish. Luckily, Nanami and Hiro come to their aid, with Nanami mentioning how four years ago these goldfish were involved in a game stage. Paca notices that Kaikoku has disappeared from the White Room, although its door is still locked. Kaikoku speculates that Paca may have let him escape on purpose to round up all the defectors, and strikes up a deal with Nanami to exchange information from time to time. Yuzu, her confidence regained, explains the Luhn algorithm. She then requests that she manage on her own (with Karin left as a body pillow) when there is 30 minutes remaining; in the unlikely chance that she fail, everyone will use the last-resort method suggested by Anya prior to the stage's beginning. However halfway through assembling the puzzle Yuzu throws up and Karin rushes to find someone in a panic. Yuzu longs to touch someone and not be alone, feeling the Ouija board ghost, whom she calls "Big Sister", pat her head. Paca takes pity on her and helps her fill in the border of the puzzle, before leaving a final piece behind and warning her not to forget her master again as a "Recorder". The players manage to unlock the White Room and free Kaikoku, who returns there momentarily after promising Sakura not to tell her brother. In the infirmary, Kaikoku confronts Yuzu about the data in her room, to which she explains that she is a monitor prototype, or "Recorder", for the game who sends all information to Paca regarding the players' emotions and thoughts, and allows Kaikoku to decide what his next action will be towards her. Kaikoku decides to call it a truce until Yuzu has decided whether she wants to be their friend or foe, remembering Zakuro telling him how she worked herself till she collapsed for his sake. As he leaves, Yuzu thanks him wholeheartedly. End-of-episode view count: 050862191
11	"Isolated Soul"	September 15, 2019
Paca invites them into a virtual-reality (VR) simulation game for Stage 9, where the players from the Ouija board game will have to raise the child-versions of Kaikoku, Yuzu, Makino and Himiko so that the bulbs on their heads will bloom into flowers, based on the amount of love given to them. Players will clear the game when three out of four flowers bloom. Himiko is easily done in by tamagoyaki, Kaikoku by his favourite dried fish and Yuzu by Akatsuki and Karin praising her intelligence. Although this meets the conditions for clearing the game, Paca reveals that there has been a glitch and Makino still remains connected in his capsule and synced to the game, which means that he will still remain in his child form. Even with help from the now-reverted Yuzu, Himiko and Kaikoku, Makino refuses to bloom and seems to look extremely sad. Iride manages to find Makino's real body held in the game and chats with him about love. Makino recalls how his parents always fought and neglected him, but he was taken care of by his kind teenage neighbour Sumire as a child, falling in love with her. However Sumire never knew his feelings and fell in love with someone else instead, causing Makino to turn to love games for comfort. Iride confesses how his mother isn't actually related to him, but despite that he still loves her, and advises Makino to move on even though his love interest isn't looking at him. Child Makino blooms, with further prompting from Zakuro who asks to call him by his first name, into a hilarious afro head flower. As everyone laughs, Paca looks over the game monitors and warns that the real fun is about to begin.
12	"Journey Goes On"	September 22, 2019
Everyone speculates whether Makino has a girlfriend and his actual age, with Iride being the only one guessing that he is older than him. Paca invites the group into a bonus stage where players gamble to double their coins and win "attractive" prizes, with the grand prize as a "Wish-Granting Ticket" where Paca will grant the wish of a person provided it is within the game. The players go around gambling, but as Iride plays a game he is sucked into an alternate portal and disappears. Paca assures that Iride will not come to any harm, but as the stage has a 2-hour time limit if Iride does not return the game will close and he will be stranded there forever. Paca gloats that the likelihood of Iride returning is low though. In the portal, Iride sees a vision of a woman resembling him. Everyone decides to save Iride using the Ticket. With only a few minutes left, Makino manages to earn close to 5000 coins by playing slots, half of the Ticket's cost. Yuzu decides to bet 5000 coins on the game with the highest probability of winning, High or Low, where the player guesses whether a facedown card is higher or lower than the first card dealt. As Paca deals an 8 which is the midpoint value of the deck, everyone is stuck in a dilemma until they recall Iride's firm conviction that Makino's girlfriend is older than him, and how his predictions have always been correct and filled with conviction despite the odds, managing to win and save him. In a pre-credits scene, the woman from Iride's vision -- his adoptive mother -- assures a dark-haired man that her condition is stable in the Iride household. He walks out to a car, where Karin's detective brother and Anya's brother Shinya await. End-of-episode view count: 070094653

== Reception ==
The anime adaptation's first episode garnered poor reviews from Anime News Network's staff during the Summer 2019 season previews. James Beckett felt the gimmicky premise lacked meaningful content and only carried "by-the-numbers" storytelling and "purely functional" animation, saying it lacks the "charm, inventiveness, and fun" of the Danganronpa franchise; Rebecca Silverman was critical of the show not accentuating the strengths of its premise and being undecided of its genre but was optimistic of its improved growth based on the familiar plot; Theron Martin criticized the premise for having no "entertainment value" and not giving an explanation of its overall world filled with uninteresting characters. The fourth reviewer, Nick Creamer, praised Shin Oonuma's direction for adding "visual diversity" to the episode but criticized the overall bland artwork and unsalvageable story for carrying "archetypal" characters that deliver "simplistic and obnoxious" comedy. Fellow ANN editor Caitlin Moore reviewed the complete anime series in 2020. She commended the show's "visual panache" for delivering atmospheric horror in its episodes but felt it wasn't enough for this "poorly-written Danganronpa imitator" to distract viewers from its "subpar script" having "poor pacing", tonal inconsistencies and unmemorable characters to engage with throughout a story that gives a "non-ending" for its conclusion, concluding that "[I]t never tries to stand on its own merits, which are few and far between. It is, in a word, bad."
