= C3 (novel series) =

Japanese light novel series

- C³
- Cover of the first light novel featuring Fear Kubrick.
- Genre: Action, harem, supernatural
- Light novel
- Written by: Hazuki Minase
- Illustrated by: Sasorigatame
- Published by: ASCII Media Works
- Imprint: Dengeki Bunko
- Original run: September 10, 2007 – June 7, 2013
- Volumes: 17
- Manga
- Written by: Tsukako Akina
- Published by: ASCII Media Works
- Magazine: Dengeki Daioh
- Original run: February 26, 2011 – January 26, 2013
- Volumes: 3
- Anime television series
- Directed by: Shin Oonuma
- Written by: Michiko Yokote
- Music by: Jun Ichikawa
- Studio: Silver Link
- Licensed by: NA: Funimation
- Original network: AT-X, BS11, Chiba TV, KBS Kyoto, Sun TV, Tokyo MX, TV Aichi, TV Kanagawa, TV Saitama
- Original run: October 1, 2011 – December 17, 2011
- Episodes: 12 + OVA

C³, also known as C Cube (Japanese: シーキューブ, Hepburn: Shīkyūbu) or Cube×Cursed×Curious, is a Japanese light novel series written by Hazuki Minase, and illustrated by Sasorigatame. C³ is about a high school student named Haruaki Yachi, who receives a mysterious black cube from his father who is overseas. That night, Haruaki is woken by a noise and is surprised to find a girl named Fear Kubrick in his kitchen eating rice crackers. Haruaki confirms that she is the cube, but knows nothing about her past other than that she has a curse on her which she wants broken. Breaking the curse though proves hard as there are organizations that seek to capture or destroy Fear, along with her dark past as a "Cursed Tool" which comes to light. Haruaki vows to protect her though, and is joined along by other allies/friends as the series progresses.

The series was later adapted into a manga, and appeared as a serial in the manga magazine Dengeki Daioh from February 26, 2011, to January 26, 2013. ASCII Media Works then published the chapters in three bound volumes. An anime adaptation came next, which aired on various networks from October 1, 2011, to December 17, 2011. Twelve episodes aired in all, excluding an OVA to the series which was later released on April 25, 2012. Funimation acquired the license to the anime for a North American release late in 2015, and the complete series along with the OVA was released in march of the following year.

== Plot ==
The story begins with high-school student Yachi Haruaki receiving a mysterious super-heavy black cube from his overseas archaeologist father. That night, Haruaki wakes to a suspicious noise in the kitchen and discovers a stark-naked young girl with blue hair stealing rice crackers. The girl introduces herself as "Fear" (pronounced "Fia" in Japanese), and Haruaki comes to the conclusion that she is the cube that his father had sent. Fear explains that she is a Cursed Tool, objects which were used in the past by humans to fill out their evil desires. Over time they began to possess human attributes at a great price which include gaining human emotions, and hurting others without control. Haruaki assures her that he is immune to any curse that she might give him, and vows to help out by getting rid of her curse. Allied with next-door neighbour Konoha Muramasa and the strict class representative Kirika Ueno, they try to help her remove her curse, but in the process gets involved in many dangerous organisations, and other Cursed Tool incidents.

== Characters ==
Haruaki Yachi (夜知 春亮, Yachi Haruaki)
Voiced by: Yuki Kaji
The male protagonist and a student at Taishu High School. His father has a habit of sending him Cursed artifacts to remove the curses within, as their home is in a blessed location, a focal point for positive energy which gradually removes curses, and thus makes him immune to any curses. Due to the fact that his mother was never seen or mentioned in the series and his father is traveling, he developed a talent in cooking and is highly independent. He has a very stubborn but friendly personality, and does not hesitate when it comes to protecting his friends. Haruaki is somewhat aware of all the girls' feelings towards him, but never acts upon taking steps towards a serious relationship with any of them.
Fear Kubrick (フィア・キューブリック, Fia Kyūburikku; also "Fear Cubrick")
Voiced by: Yukari Tamura
The female protagonist, she's actually a Cursed Tool, whose full name is Fear-In-Cube, a torture device that resembles a solid metal cube. Fear-In-Cube has 32 torture capabilities which include an Iron maiden, and a Guillotine among other things. Fear was developed during the height of the Inquisitions, and has caused countless people's agonizing deaths to the point where she risks going homicidally insane upon hearing someone scream in pain. Eventually she developed a curse of her own, causing anyone who owns her to go insane, driving the owner to want to use her to torture people and revel in their pain and screams. Due to her extended time in the depths of a Spanish castle Fear has also developed animosity for spiders, as they would build cobwebs around her original form. Out of disgust at her past, Fear prefers to stay in human form. She regards Haruaki as her owner, and her anxiety is eased by his assurances that her curse can not affect him. Fear's torture abilities are over time neutralized by things called indulgence disks which are found in other cursed tools. She appears to have a developing crush towards Haruaki but responds to him in a Tsundere type of way when she gets shy. Fear's favorite catchphrase is "I'll curse you", and has an addiction to rice crackers.
Konoha Muramasa (村正 このは, Muramasa Konoha)
Voiced by: Minori Chihara
A long resident at the Yachi compound, Konoha is also a Cursed Tool in the true form of a katana. In human form, she still retains her powers of slicing clean through objects, which are her sword characteristics. Her curse towards her owner differs between adaptations but does not play an essential role in the story due to Haruaki's immunity to curses. Konoha's status as a Cursed Tool has almost been lifted, but when she sees blood for an extended period of time a relapse can occur towards a blood-thirsty personality with blue hair and eyes similar to Fear. Konoha tends more though to faint at the sight of blood as a result of hypnosis that was self induced in order to keep her blood lust from overwhelming her. She also wears special glasses to help block her vision of too much blood. Little is known of her history before the start of the story other than she is a childhood friend to Haruaki. He sometimes calls her "onee-san" (older sister) as he did when they were kids in order to obtain a special favor from her. To the outside world she and Haruaki are related cousins, and she goes to a different classroom than him. She doesn't get along well with Fear whom she refers to as a "child", and is jealous when she gets too close to Haraki due to Konoha's crush on him. She is also aware that Kirika not only loves but is a rival for him. Fear Kubrick is also jealous of her breasts, where she nicknames her "cow tits".
Kirika Ueno (上野 錐霞, Ueno Kirika)
Voiced by: Eri Kitamura
Kirika is a classmate of Haruaki, and is also the Student Council President. She is in possession of two Cursed Tools, one called Ginistrang's Love, and the other The River of Black Strings (or Tragic Black River). Both of these tools give her advantages in battle including the ability to not be killed by a fatal injury, though in exchange they come with terrible effects. She will die if she ever removes Ginistrang's Love which looks like a bdsm-style outfit, as for the other tool she satisfies the curse by using herself as a victim since the bondage suit will heal the injuries that Black River inflicts. Kirika feels disgusted with her body as she did not choose to have these cursed items placed upon her. She is also a reluctant member of a group founded by her older brother that has more than one name depending on the adaptation. This group studies and researches Cursed Tools as the ultimate mysteries to explore. She has a crush on Haruaki, and often competes with him over whose cooking is better during lunch period. He later finds out about her Cursed Tools, and what she must do in order to satisfy the curse of Black River. He isn't bothered by it though, and the trust further strengthens their relationship. Kirika's catchphrase is "Absolutely ridiculous!" which she uses on more than one occasion.
Kuroe Ningyouhara (人形原 黒繪, Ningyōhara Kuroe)
Voiced by: Yui Ogura
Kuroe is a Cursed Tool in the form of a doll who has recently returned to Haruaki's house. She is a Japanese doll with extendible hair, and chose the 'e' kanji of her name to give the impression of "pretty as a picture". Kuroe has a very friendly and calm personality but usually seems emotionless, those that know her well though like Haruaki, can tell if she's feeling a particular emotion. She can freely control her hair like tentacles or hands for many purposes such as moving things or healing others using her life energy. She recharges by running a salon where she cuts peoples hair and then feeds on the residual life energy inherent in the cut hair after closing, partly to keep her life energy up and partly because she finds the hair delicious. Due to the trust and thanks from her customers and fellow shopkeepers she has completely removed her curse. Her original curse was that she would attempt to steal her owners' life energy at night by cutting off bits of their hair, and absorbing it until they died. It is shown that Kuroe finds amusement in her practical jokes and playful flirting towards Haruaki.

== Media ==
=== Light novels ===
No.	Release date	ISBN
01	September 10, 2007	978-4-8402-3975-2
02	January 10, 2008	978-4-8402-4143-4
03	April 10, 2008	978-4-04-867023-4
04	August 10, 2008	978-4-04-867178-1
05	December 10, 2008	978-4-04-867422-5
06	March 10, 2009	978-4-04-867597-0
07	July 10, 2009	978-4-04-867899-5
08	November 10, 2009	978-4-04-868143-8
09	March 10, 2010	978-4-04-868397-5
10	September 10, 2010	978-4-04-868879-6
11	April 10, 2011	978-4-04-870421-2
12	October 10, 2011	978-4-04-870957-6
13	December 10, 2011	978-4-04-886246-2
14	July 10, 2012	978-4-04-886707-8
15	October 10, 2012	978-4-04-886982-9
16	March 10, 2013	978-4-04-891433-8
17	June 7, 2013	978-4-04-891677-6

=== Manga ===
The manga series started in late 2011, and is complete with a total of 3 volumes.

=== Anime ===
An anime television adaptation of C³ was announced in the April 2011 issue of ASCII Media Works's Dengeki AnimeStyle pamphlet. The series was produced by StarChild and Silver Link under the direction of Shin Oonuma with Michiko Yokote as script supervisor. The opening theme song for the first 8 episodes is "Endless Story" performed by Yukari Tamura and the ending theme song is "Yuki Hana" (雪華, "Snow Flower") performed by Eri Kitamura. From episode 9 onwards, the opening theme is "Shirushi" (紋, "Sign") by Eri Kitamura and the ending theme is "Sympathy of Love" by Yukari Tamura. Funimation licensed the series in North America.

No.	Title	Original release date
1	"I Don't Know What Moved Into My Futon"; Transliteration: "Futon ni Utsuru Mono o Shiranai" (Japanese: 布団に移るものを知らない)	October 1, 2011
The story begins when a high school student named Yachi Haruaki receives a mysterious, super-heavy blue cube from his archaeologist father overseas. There proves to be more to the cube than what meets the eye when that night, Haruaki wakes up to a suspicious noise in the kitchen, and discovers a fully naked female rice cracker thief. The girl introduces herself as Fear, a Cursed Tool, or Wathe, born from negative human emotions meant to maim and kill, and enlists his help in removing the curse placed upon her to torture others. They are joined by Konoha Muramasa, who takes an immediate dislike to Fear, but nevertheless agrees to help her, for Konoha is a fellow former Cursed Tool herself, existing as both a girl with braided hair and glasses as well as a katana. After Haruaki tells Fear to combat her negative self with positive thoughts and good deeds, Fear tries to help clean the house only to nearly destroy it and make a mess. As she runs away after being reprimanded, Haruaki apologises to her for not listening to her explanations and understanding her lack of human world knowledge. Slowly, Fear begins to trust him.
2	"Where, What, Something"; Transliteration: "Doko ni, Nani o, Nani ka" (Japanese: どこに、なにを、なにか)	October 8, 2011
Haruaki tells her that she is going to be transferred to his school together with Konoha, much to Konoha's disdain. Fear's appearance immediately has the whole school go crazy over her adorable appearance and child-like attitude. After letting the entire class in on the fact she knows Haruaki, he gets questioned as to the relationship between the two. Fear, on the other hand, deals with several clubs trying to pressure her into joining them. After school ends, Fear reflects on the hectic first day, and along with Haruaki and Konoha, decides to take a detour to a lookout point by the ocean. A happy moment there turns dangerous when they are attacked by Peavey Barowoi, a sadistic woman from an organization dedicated to exterminating Cursed Tools (The Knights of the Battlefront), specifically Fear, whose full name is revealed to be Fear-In-Cube. Peavey reveals Fear's dark past as a Cursed Tool created during the Height of the Inquisitions, and her participation in it as a torture device with 32 methods of making people suffer. As the two battle, Peavey's weapon arm is ripped off, causing her to bleed, and Fear to regain her former sadistic demeanor.
3	"The Antinomy of Their Temperatures"; Transliteration: "Karera no Ondo no Niritsuhaihan" (Japanese: 彼らの温度の二律背反)	October 15, 2011
Fear mercilessly slices off one of Peavey's arms, revelling as she screams with pain, losing control and ultimately attacking Haruaki. After Peavey retreats, Fear returns to normal but feeling that she has been foolish to believe that she could actually lift her curse, she runs away and attempts to commit suicide. Meanwhile, Konoha tends to Haruaki's wound and reminds him what it was like for her adjusting to being human and coming to terms with both her good and evil sides. Fear, on the other hand, is caught wandering through town by Ueno Kirika, the student council president of Haruaki and Konoha's school, whom she attacks blindly in an alleyway before coming to her senses and fleeing. After several hours of searching, Haruaki manages to find Fear after she has jumped into the ocean during a storm and carries her home on his back, explaining to her that she is welcome to stay with him no matter what and that he truly believes she can lift her curse. Because of this, he will put up with her selfishness and lack of human knowledge. Later, an incident in the bath provokes Konoha into moving in with Haruaki.
4	"At Night, a Mother and a Hugging Pillow"; Transliteration: "Yoru ni wa Hahaoya to Dakimakura o" (Japanese: 夜には母親と抱き枕を)	October 22, 2011
Mummy Maker, an Auxiliary from The Knight of the Battlefront and Peavey's partner, comes to the house to strike a deal with Haruaki, Konoha and Fear while Kirika is there, giving them three options of turning Fear over. She promises to return at noon the following day to destroy Fear, and that they have until then to decide. Konoha, however, instructs Fear not fight because she is too dangerous. Meanwhile, a vengeful Peavey vows to kill Fear no matter what the cost and unveils a massive Cursed Tool axe named "Dance Time." By viciously slaughtering Mummy Maker after learning of her offer, Peavey activates Dance Time's curse (The user won't stop fighting with the axe until the enemy is dead even if the user dies) and shows up at Haruaki's house. Haruaki and Konoha go up against her alone until Fear, sidelined by Konoha's demand, exclaims that she is "very selfish" and enters the fight.
5	"Even If I'm Cursed"; Transliteration: "Tatoe Norowarete mo" (Japanese: たとえ呪われても)	October 29, 2011
After an intense battle throughout the night, the three friends retreat into the house to give Haruaki some time to rest. They are unaware that Kirika has come to visit so she falls hostage to Peavey. With teamwork, the trio manages to back Peavey into a corner, but she slaughters Kirika before Haruaki can stop her. However, Kirika manages to survive the attack and uses a Cursed Tool in her possession to help finish off a shocked Peavey. As Peavey fears her own death, she cries out for Mummy Maker, but then realizes that there is no one to help her because she killed Mummy Maker. Fear promptly breaks her only arm using a torture device, while Kirika strangles Peavey into unconsciousness using a black ribbon unravelling from her sleeve. As Fear, Konoha and Haruaki demand an explanation, Kirika reveals to them that she is in possession of two Cursed Tools against her will: Ginstrangs Love, which ensures that she will never die from physical injury unless she removes it, and "The River of Black Strings", an extendable black ribbon which she uses for self-protection. Kirika also gifts Fear an Indulgence Disc, a programme retrieved from Cursed Tools (in this case, Dance Time) that can neutralise Fear's bloodthirsty personality and force it into submission.
6	"Weak, Like a Spherical Glass"; Transliteration: "Kyūkei Garasu ni Nite Zeijaku na" (Japanese: 球形硝子に似て脆弱な)	November 5, 2011
The enthusiastic Cursed Tool collector Superintendent Gabriel calls in Haruaki, Fear and Konoha to receive a suitcase containing a Cursed Tool in the form of a doll. The suitcase is empty, so Gabriel revises his request to find it. At the same time they learn of several students in the school fainting and their life force being drained. Eventually, the trio tracks down Sovereignty, the Cursed Tool doll with blue hair and frills responsible for the situation, inside the sewing room. They are also approached by a pink-haired girl named Shiraho, the daughter of the antique shop owner Superintendent Gabriel bought the doll from. As they attempt to capture Sovereignty, she flees into the night. Later, Shiraho, Fear, and Haruaki discuss what Sovereignty may do next, and hope to convince her to try and break her curse with Haruaki's help. Haruaki is called to the sports field fence, where he encounters Sovereignty again, and attempts to convince her to live at his house and break her curse. Sovereignty rejects his plea, although explaining that she does not want her curse removed, and Haruaki hears that there has been another student attacked. The description matches...
7	"Not Reflected in the Eyes of a Seer"; Transliteration: "Yokensha no Me ni Utsuranai" (Japanese: 予見者の眼に映らない)	November 12, 2011
Konoha has become the next victim of Sovereignty. As she rests in Haruaki's house, Kirika becomes angry because he is keeping information from her and trying to keep her completely uninvolved due to his promise to treat her "normally" as a classmate and student and not someone who knows about Cursed Tools. After Konoha recovers they investigate the situation further. When Shiraho disappears as well, the four students (Kirika insists on getting involved) ask the school nurse for Shiraho's address who hands them the file. Upon looking at Shiraho's file, it is discovered that the Shiraho they knew had lied; it was in fact the pink-haired girl that was Sovereignty and the blue-haired girl with frills to be the real Shiraho. Afraid they are running out of time, the four friends rush to Shiraho's residence only to find their suspicions confirmed. Sovereignty, suffering from its curse, has pinned Shiraho to a wall with one of its blades. Fear and Kirika force Sovereignty off Shiraho, but things only get worse when Sovereignty unwillingly rushes Haruaki with the blade instead. Kirika takes the blow and Sovereignty flees in a terrified state. The group is left with Shiraho, who explains that Sovereignty's true curse is that the owner will fall in love with him/her due to it being the perfect girl/boy doll (it is androgynous) before being killed by Sovereignty's blades when the Killing Organ within Sovereignty detects a certain level of love. The reason for Sovereignty attacking others was to temporarily distort the Sovereignty's power to measure love so that the Killing Organ would be rendered unusable for the time being.
8	"Like an Inescapable Curse"; Transliteration: "Nogareenu Noroi no Yō na" (Japanese: 逃れ得ぬ呪いのような)	November 19, 2011
After Shiraho tells the story of how she met Sovereignty, Fear, Konoha and Kirika devise a plan to put an end to the issue. Since Sovereignty carries a phone thanks to Shiraho, Fear calls it, and sadistically claims she will torture Shiraho to death if Sovereignty does not confront her at Shiraho's house. When the time arrives, Fear goes mad and viciously fights Sovereignty along with Kirika while a dumbfounded Haruaki (who wasn't told anything about the plan) has Konoha's blade form at Shiraho's throat. Eventually, Fear and Konoha manage to change Sovereignty's curse through extreme means by forcing Sovereignty's Killing Organ to kick into full gear and expose all its blades while Konoha destroys them, allowing him/her to embrace Shiraho without it being the last. Later, after getting called down to the Superintendent's office, Shiraho is absolved from any wrongdoing while Sovereignty is made into Zenon's assistant/maid (in female mode, of course). Fear also obtains another Indulgence Disc from Sovereignty that was apparently embedded in the Killing Organ.
9	"The Returnee Seems Somehow Strange"; Transliteration: "Kikansha wa Dokoka Fushigi na" (Japanese: 帰還者は何処か不思議な)	November 26, 2011
While Fear is home alone practicing her dance for the school's athletic festival, Haruaki and Konoha are out shopping. After a few frustrated failures, Fear storms inside only to discover a spider is lurking in the house. As Fear tries to hunt it, a large creature captures her causing her to scream. Haruaki hears and rushes in only to find Fear being suspended in the air by the hair of a former lodger at his house, Kuroe Ningyouhara. A former cursed Japanese doll designed to drain her owner's life force, Kuroe is now completely lifted from her curse and has opened up a famous hair salon. After an awkward reconciliation, Kuroe explains that she came back to town deciding she will open up her old hair salon. Kuroe also reveals she has been targeted by a strange group, which is met with the timely arrival of a strange woman carrying an oversized viola case named Alice. Alice introduces herself as a member of the Vivolio Families, an organisation devoted to worshipping Cursed Tools, stating she simply wants to invite Kuroe to stay with her. Upon recognizing Fear-in-Cube, however, Alice shifts to trying to get her to join instead of Kuroe. Fear promptly rejects, causing Alice to take her leave. As she leaves the grounds, Alice declares she'll try to invite Fear to the Vivolio Families once more. Meanwhile, Kirika discovers that her partner from her research organization is responsible for releasing Sovereignty and causing the incident. Later that day Haruaki, Fear, Konoha and Sovereignty hand out flyers announcing the reopening of Kuroe's hair salon. As the group hands out flyers, Haruaki explains to Fear that Kuroe managed to break her curse when she discovered she had a natural talent for hair styling. As the store readies to reopen, a crowd of onlookers and Kuroe's fans show up, all giving gifts to the town's idol including Zenon, Shiraho and Sovereignty. As customers begin to flow into the store, Haruaki, Fear and Konoha begin helping out. As the day winds down, Alice returns to the shop just to get her hair styled by Kuroe. However, as she leaves the store, she announces to the group: "I'm the culprit."
10	"The Sadist Is Nowhere to Be Found"; Transliteration: "Shigyakusha wa Doko ni mo Inai" (Japanese: 嗜虐者は何処にもいない)	December 3, 2011
In the middle of the night, Kirika is woken by a phone call from her partner Himura, who informs her that she is not to get involved with the Vivolio Families, which Kirika questions. The next day, while Fear is practising her dance with Konoha, Haruaki and Kuroe watching, the peaceful atmosphere gets interrupted when the group hears of a strange incident: a woman in her late thirties has been murdered. Later at school, Fear overhears Haruaki and his friend Taizo talking about the murder, when Taizo explains that the victim was crushed into the shape of a box and parts of their body missing. This unnerves Fear, who later explains that this may be Alice's way of trying to force Fear to join the Vivolio Families. Haruaki and company track her down to a diner, but Alice refuses to divulge anything as to the crime and leaves. Fear, Haruaki and Konoha promptly give chase, leading the two to an abandoned house. After a two minute battle in which Alice unveils a Cursed Tool in her possession named "Carnival Cooker", she tears down the house on the trio. Konoha cuts her way out of the rubble while Fear protects Haruaki inside of her Brazen Bull configuration, the Howling Steel Ox. Shortly afterwards, while Haruaki and Kirika are working on paper work, she collapses and a panicking Haruaki carries her to the infirmary. Kirika wakes up shortly after and against Haruaki's insistence to stay in bed asks to head back home. School nurse Ganon arranges for a taxi to take them back, where Kirika invites Haruaki inside. In her house, Haruaki asks if Kirika is hiding anything from him and says that it is OK to tell him since the two are "partners" in Haruaki's opinion. The request moves Kirika, who promptly asks Haruaki to watch what she has been "blackmailed" to do. Kirika then takes off her school uniform and asks a speechless Haruaki to watch as she painfully strangles herself and breaks several bones in her body with her River of Black Strings. After a short while, she is revived by Ginastronte's Love, and explains to Haruaki that River of Black Strings forces its user to injure others. However, Kirika satisfies the curse by what she calls "a repulsive form of playing alone". Haruaki then compliments her kindness, saying Ueno truly cares about her friends by letting herself suffer this way. Later that night, Haruaki finds Fear outside of one of the appliance stores watching the news. As another murder is revealed on TV, Fear explains that the victims were both customers at Kuroe's salon. This prompts Fear to implicate Kuroe as the culprit.
11	"The Fanatic Is Somewhere"; Transliteration: "Kyōshinja wa Dokoka ni Iru" (Japanese: 狂信者は何処かにいる)	December 10, 2011
Kirika shows up at the Yachi residence, finally deciding to get involved with the situation. She begins breaking down the information that the group knows so far. However, Fear interrupts and pins the murders on Kuroe due to suspicion and runs off to her room when Haruaki interjects. Kirika promptly asks Kuroe for an explanation, to which she states that she knew the hair was of the deceased and ate it both in spirit of mourning the dead and also to replenish her special abilities. Shortly afterwards, Alice returns and lures Fear and Konoha outside, while Kirika, Haruaki and Kuroe are still in the house. Kirika immediately figures out Alice was splitting the group up, and is proven correct when Alice renders Kuroe immobile with another Cursed Tool in her possession, the Suicidal-Beautification Mirror, and kidnaps the three of them with a blade to Haruaki's neck. Alice later explains in a video message to Fear that her only wish is to become Fear's family to her, a being that isn't even human. Declaring all Wathe as "Transcendental", Alice exclaims that Wathe and their curses are above humans and that Wathe should be free to satisfy their curses on humans. Alice then reveals that all those who had died are actually members of the Vivolio Families, and that the reason parts of their bodies were removed is because of Carnival Cooker's curse, which forces its user to eat anyone they kill, making Alice a cannibal. Upon the video's end, Fear and Konoha immediately refuse Alice's offer. Suddenly a bruised and cut up Kirika is heard crashing through the glass. It is revealed that her partner from the lab snuck in and saved her using a Wathe called "He in the Bastille", a spiked helmet that causes the wearer to become practically unnoticeable in any way. Himura then tasers a visibly angered Kirika and takes her from Alice. When Kirika wakes up in Himura's car, she questions Himura's role only for him to explain that the whole situation is observe only for him, as he cares more about research. Kirika retorts, complaining that she feels like just a tool, prompting Himura to agree and accept that fact. Kirika finally snaps at this, declaring she's fed up with the Laboratory Emirate and forces Himura to crash his car. As Kirika finishes her explanation to Fear and Konoha as to what happened, she asks what they think of Haruaki's powers. Dumbfounded, the two girls think at first it is his personality and cooking prowess, only for her to laugh and say it is his friends.
12	"The Transcendentals Are Everywhere"; Transliteration: "Chōetsusha wa Dokonidemo Iru" (Japanese: 超越者は何処にでもいる)	December 17, 2011
Fear, Konoha and Kirika finally confront Alice, and a vicious battle between the groups ensues. Alice easily holds off Fear and Konoha, while a distraught Haruaki decides enough is enough and pulls his hands through the handcuffs causing him to bleed profusely. Haruaki then carries the still immobile Kuroe off, asking her to heal him after the fight ends. Haruaki reunites with the rest of the group, causing Alice to get irritated by his escape and the fact she's outnumbered. Alice then states she'll level the playing field, which Fear calls as a bluff. Alice retorts, saying she has something that turns "bluffs into reality." She pulls out her Suicidal-Beautification Mirror and explains its three uses: To make the user beautiful, to render a person immobile, and to create polarized clones of the user that last for ten minutes each. Alice activates the latter, and creates more than a dozen clones of herself. Fear, thinking the clones will vanish if she destroys the mirror, rushes the original with her Human Body Perforation Drill configuration, only for one of the clones to intercept it and take the blow, much to Fear's horror. As the blood spills from the clone's body, Konoha's hemophilia kicks in, causing her to turn away. Fear, on the other hand, almost goes insane again because she caused the death of a human again. Alice tries to push this further with the torment until Kirika attacks Alice. Alice counters, however and immobilizes Kirika after slicing her abdomen. Taking notice of her Wathe's abilities, Alice shoves her hand inside the wound and begins squeezing her organs, much to Haruaki's horror. He promptly takes Konoha's sword form and rushes Alice, but gets overwhelmed and thrown aside. At this point, Shiraho and Sovereignty appear, with the latter using her abilities to throw Kuroe into Alice's Mirror, breaking it and undoing Kuroe's immobilization. Kuroe follows up and uses her hair to capture the remaining clones, allowing Fear to continue her battle with Alice. Frustrated with this development, Alice asks Fear if she knew how much love she had for Fear. Fear retorts, saying that hurting Haruaki and making her kill a clone of her was too much and promptly disavows Alice's love for the way she used to be. Claiming that thanks to Haruaki that she could become human Fear declares this as her reason to go on living, leaving Alice unable to comprehend it all. Haruaki uses this as a distraction and promptly breaks Carnival Cooker with Konoha's sword form. With this, Fear summons one of her largest configurations she has, Configuration Number 29: Choking Sacred Image, Steel Virgin Mary. Declaring that she wants to be human, Fear traps Alice in the Steel Virgin Mary. As Alice is pulled into the Steel Virgin Mary, she asks why she would become a weak, foolish human. Fear responds, claiming Alice is right, but states that she wants to be happy like humans as well. Fear exclaims for that reason, she sees humans as the true Transcendentals. As the Steel Virgin Mary closes on her, Alice tearfully screams before getting shut into it. As the sun rises, a battered and cut Alice has her back to the ocean. Stating that they should almost be here, Alice jumps off into the sea, only to get caught by a passerby in a boat. Fear, seeing this, fires off one last attack to stop her along with Kuroe, but both attacks are intercepted by the Wathe who is on board. The Wathe, Abyss, tells Fear that even though they fought Alice truly loves her. Abyss also reveals that two Indulgence Discs are in Carnival Cooker and the Suicidal Beautification Mirror, respectively, and Fear can have them. After the Athletic Festival, Fear asks Haruaki one more time is she can truly remove her curse, and how Kuroe and Konoha were relieved of their curses but still had their powers, and wonders if they were humans turned into Cursed Tools or tools turned into humans, to which Haruaki replies she doesn't have to know and promises her that he will remove her curse.
13 (OVA)	"Outdoor School Confusion!" (Japanese: 林間学校こんふゅーじょん!)	April 25, 2012 (OVA)
All of the main characters go on a school trip into the mountains. Upon arriving though the principal informs Fear, and Haruaki via a video recording that the true intention of the trip as there are cursed monsters lurking about. The trip goes by without a problem until Fear hears someone scream, and large impressions in the ground along with slime is found but nobody is reported to be missing or scared of anything unusual. Haruaki is then later kidnapped, and taken to an unusual cave that the principal had mentioned in his recording. Fear is able to overcome her fear of spiders, and rescue Haruaki whom is tied up. The whole thing ends up being a prank by the principal with Kuroe, and Sovereignty in on it as helpers. The intention was to strengthen the bonds of the main characters, and cure Fear of her fear of spiders. Confident that spiders are no match for her now, she is soon terrified again by a spider that appears behind her when Ueno asks her to turn around.

== Reception ==
Gabriella Ekens from Anime News Network criticized the anime for its unoriginal plot and characters, though she praised its visuals and considered it an entertaining show. Tristan Crocker from Anime Herald gave a similar review, calling the story and characters underdeveloped, while at the same time deeming the show "a fun surprise".

== See also ==
- Final Fantasy Lost Stranger, a manga series also written by Hazuki Minase
