= Dusk Maiden of Amnesia =

Japanese manga series

- First tankōbon volume cover, featuring Yuuko Kanoe

黄昏乙女×アムネジア (Tasogare Otome × Amunejia)
- Genre: Dark fantasy; Mystery; Romance
- Manga
- Written by: Maybe
- Published by: Square Enix
- English publisher: Square Enix (digital)
- Magazine: Monthly Gangan Joker
- Original run: April 22, 2009 – June 22, 2013
- Volumes: 10
- Anime television series
- Directed by: Shin Oonuma; Takashi Sakamoto
- Produced by: Hayato Kaneko; Masatoshi Ishizuka; Takashi Tachizaki; Tatsuhiro Nitta
- Written by: Katsuhiko Takayama
- Music by: Monaca
- Studio: Silver Link
- Licensed by: AUS: Hanabee; NA: Sentai Filmworks; UK: MVM Films
- Original network: Tokyo MX, Chiba TV, tvk, Sun TV
- Original run: April 8, 2012 – June 24, 2012
- Episodes: 12 + OVA
- icon

Dusk Maiden of Amnesia (Japanese: 黄昏乙女×アムネジア, Hepburn: Tasogare Otome × Amunejia), stylized as Dusk maiden of Amnesia, is a Japanese manga series written and illustrated by the duo Maybe. It was published by Square Enix and serialized in the Monthly Gangan Joker magazine from April 2009 to June 2013, with its chapters collected in ten tankōbon volumes. An anime television series adaptation by Silver Link aired between April and June 2012. The anime series has been licensed by Sentai Filmworks in North America.

== Synopsis ==
=== Setting ===
The story takes place at Seikyou Private Academy: an extremely old school with several buildings, each built at different points in history without care for the existing architecture. Many of them overlap and mix with each other, resulting in an unintentional maze-like structure, within which the untrained can easily lose their way. The School was built over an old shrine, which is where Yuuko died. Since her body and regrets are tied to the school, she is unable to leave the school grounds even if she wanted to. In the series, a 'Ghost' is formed from the person's regrets while they were alive. One can see them only if believing in the ghost's existence—but depending on one's expectations and knowledge, what they see will vary greatly: from Yuuko's true form (as she sees herself and was before she died) to a demonic entity.

=== Plot ===
==== Manga ====
Teiichi Niiya, a first-year middle school student at Seikyou Private Academy, encounters a ghost named Yuuko Kanoe after wandering into one of the school's abandoned buildings. Yuuko, who lacks memories of her past, explains that she is a spirit bound to the school. Intrigued, Teiichi resolves to uncover the truth behind her death by investigating the school's seven mysteries, which are intertwined with her existence. As they explore these ghost stories, they assist others affected by supernatural phenomena. Eventually, they learn that Yuuko's memories were sealed away in a darker manifestation of herself known as "Shadow Yuuko", and only by accepting this aspect can she recall her final wish—the reason she remains as a ghost.

After solving six of the seven mysteries, Yuuko's elderly sister reveals that the seventh mystery never existed. Yuuko then embraces her shadow self and recounts her tragic past. Sixty years prior, a plague struck the town, believed by the superstitious townspeople to be divine punishment for the Kanoe family's neglect of a sacred ritual. To appease the gods, the priest—Yuuko's father—was expected to sacrifice one of his daughters. Unwilling to choose, he planned to flee, but Yuuko's sister, swayed by the townspeople's hostility, conspired to lure Yuuko back to the school. Beneath the building lay a hidden shrine where the ritual was to take place. There, Yuuko was thrown into the shrine, her leg broken and the door nailed shut to prevent escape. Left to perish, she succumbed to starvation, dehydration, and her injuries. In her final moments, she cursed all those involved in her murder, wishing for their deaths. Shortly after, the perpetrators died from the plague or madness, though the epidemic persisted. Overcome with guilt, Yuuko's sister later opened the shrine door, only to be confronted by Yuuko's vengeful spirit. Unable to kill her, Yuuko instead severed her own hatred, sealing it away as Shadow Yuuko.

Having forgiven her sister and those responsible, Yuuko prepares to pass on, but at the last moment, she hesitates, realizing her desire to stay with Teiichi. Despite this, she vanishes, and the old school building—her former anchor—is demolished. As memories of her fade, Teiichi crafts new rumors, transforming the six mysteries into tales of Yuuko's past, her redemption, and her role as the school's guardian. Believing he has become her new regret, he spreads these stories to give her a renewed presence. Soon, a new rumor emerges—one of Yuuko finding love with a boy who vanishes with her. Teiichi rushes outside and reunites with Yuuko, embracing her as the legend concludes with ambiguity over whether she took him to the afterlife.

Later, Yuuko reappears at Teiichi's side, now bound to him rather than the school. In a final moment of intimacy, she leads him to a secluded part of the old building, dressed in a wedding gown. Confessing her wish to remain with him forever, she declares her love. Teiichi, grateful to have met her, reciprocates, and the two share a kiss. With a smile, Yuuko proclaims, "Let us go to Heaven together!"—marking the beginning of their eternal bond.

==== Anime ====
Teiichi Niiya, a first-year student at Seikyou Private Academy, befriends Yuuko Kanoe, a ghost with fragmented memories. Though he initially assists her without much focus on the school's supernatural legends, their dynamic shifts as he grows closer to his classmates Kirie and Okonogi. Unaware of her own emotional limitations, Yuuko suppresses her jealousy, unknowingly transferring those feelings—along with the lingering resentment from her past—into "Shadow Yuuko", a darker manifestation of herself.

As Teiichi helps Yuuko recover her memories, the truth of her death unfolds. A key figure from her past emerges: a melancholic girl named Asa-chan, whose family perished in the plague that ravaged their town. Initially distant, Asa feared infecting Yuuko but gradually warmed to her kindness. When the superstitious townspeople sought a sacrifice to appease the gods, they forced Asa into the role of Akahito-sama, a divine messenger tasked with selecting a victim. Yuuko, believing Asa was in danger, rushed to the shrine, only for the villagers to misinterpret Asa's fearful cry as a divine decree. In the ensuing chaos, Yuuko was thrown down the shrine's steps, sustaining fatal injuries. Contrary to initial assumptions, Yuuko's sister had no hand in her death—in fact, she had previously rejected Yuuko's self-sacrificial notions.

Teiichi uncovers this truth before Yuuko does, inadvertently causing her to lose awareness of him. To restore their connection, he confronts Shadow Yuuko, reconciling her with Yuuko's true self. He reveals that Asa survived and later became his grandmother, meaning Yuuko's sacrifice ultimately led to their meeting. With her regrets resolved, Yuuko begins fading from existence. In their final moments together, she shares a bittersweet day with Teiichi, culminating in a tearful kiss. Though Kirie lightly teases him afterward, she understands Yuuko's irreplaceable role in his heart.

Unknown to them, the kiss instills a new regret within Yuuko—her desire to remain with Teiichi. This emotion anchors her to him, ensuring she does not pass on. Instead, she becomes bound to Teiichi eternally, her existence now tied not to the school but to the boy who refused to let her go.

== Characters ==
Teiichi Niiya (新谷 貞一, Niiya Teiichi)
Voiced by: Tsubasa Yonaga (Japanese); Clint Bickham (English)
Teiichi joins the Paranormal Investigations club made by Yuuko in order to find more information about Yuuko's death. He gets easily flustered when Yuuko teases him. As he interacts with Yuuko, the two of them eventually fall in love with each other.
Yuuko Kanoe (庚 夕子, Kanoe Yūko)
Voiced by: Yumi Hara (Japanese); Emily Neves (English)
Mainly known as "Yuuko-san" from the ghost stories in the school, she is the infamous ghost of Seikyou Academy and the President of the Paranormal Investigations club. She is cheerful and enjoys tricking people, but gets very jealous and angry when a girl tries to get close to Teiichi to the point of almost causing injury at times. She is flirtatious towards Teiichi, often teasing him and does not mind having her "body" being seen by him, except her skeleton (since it is the peak of her nakedness). The various ghost stories of the school are all related to Yuuko in some way. She is in love with Teiichi.
Momoe Okonogi (小此木 ももえ, Okonogi Momoe)
Voiced by: Misato Fukuen (Japanese); Brittney Karbowski (English)
A member of the Paranormal Investigations Club. She is indebted to Teiichi for saving her from the Underground demon legend (which was fabricated by Yuuko) and looks for many ghost stories in the school to help the club. She is the only member of the club that cannot see Yuuko despite learning of her existences but despite it all, she believes that the other two can see Yuuko. She in fact, saw Yuuko before but she saw only the Underground demon legend since Yuuko can be seen by anyone aware of her but their perception changes with their awareness. Okonogi had heard of the legend and then became aware hence she saw her on that form. When Teiichi "killed" the demon she could not see Yuuko in any form. She admires Teiichi and likes him.
Kirie Kanoe (庚 霧江, Kanoe Kirie)
Voiced by: Eri Kitamura (Japanese); Jessica Boone (English)
A member of Paranormal Investigations club and Yuuko's grandniece. She is the only character other than Teiichi and her own grandmother to be able to see Yuuko. She originally believed that Yuuko was an evil spirit until she learns the truth: that she was seeing Shadow Yuuko. Kirie resembles Yuuko albeit with short hair and a smaller bust as her grandmother is Yuuko's younger sister. She has some feelings for Teiichi, however she cannot confess them but tries to in ways such as suggesting that if need be she could replace Yuuko for Teiichi if she grew out her hair. She is easily frightened especially of ghosts except for Yuuko.

== Media ==
=== Manga ===
Written and illustrated by the manga artist duo Maybe, they first published two one-shots in Square Enix's Gangan Powered on April 22 and October 22, 2008. (Note: The first one-shot, Otomekokoro to Yū no Sora (乙女心と夕の空), was published in the magazine's June 2008 issue, released on April 22 of that same year; the second one, Tasogare Otome × Amunejia (黄昏乙女×アムネジア), was published on October 22 of that same year.) Dusk Maiden of Amnesia was later serialized in Square Enix's Monthly Gangan Joker from April 22, 2009, to June 22, 2013. Ten compiled tankōbon were released between August 22, 2009, and November 22, 2013. Additionally, an official guidebook and an anthology by several authors were published on November 22, 2012.

Square Enix started publishing the manga digitally in English on its Manga Up! Global service on August 4, 2024.

==== Volumes ====
No.	Japanese release date	Japanese ISBN
1	August 22, 2009	978-4-7575-2655-6
2	January 22, 2010	978-4-7575-2779-9
3	July 22, 2010	978-4-7575-2939-7
4	January 22, 2011	978-4-7575-3128-4
5	July 22, 2011	978-4-7575-3293-9
6	March 22, 2012	978-4-7575-3530-5
7	April 21, 2012	978-4-7575-3569-5
8	November 22, 2012	978-4-7575-3792-7
9	June 22, 2013	978-4-7575-3989-1
10	November 22, 2013	978-4-7575-4091-0

=== Drama CD ===
A drama CD of the manga was published by Frontier Works and released on July 22, 2010.

=== Anime ===
An anime adaptation by Silver Link was announced in the January issue of Square Enix's Monthly Gangan Joker and aired in Japan between April and June 2012 with 12 episodes with a 13th episode included in the 6th DVD and Blu-ray Disk volumes. It was also simulcasted by Crunchyroll. The opening theme is "Choir Jail" by Konomi Suzuki whilst the ending theme is "Karandorie" (カランドリエ) by Aki Okui with a special version sung by Yumi Hara in episode 11. In episode 12 the insert song is "Requiem" by Nao Hiiragi. The anime has been licensed by Sentai Filmworks in North America and released a dubbed version of the anime on DVD and Blu-ray Disc on June 4, 2013. MVM Films have licensed the anime for the United Kingdom for release on DVD on February 10, 2014.

==== Episodes ====
No.	Title	Original release date
1	"Ghost Maiden"; Transliteration: "Yūrei Otome" (Japanese: 幽霊乙女)	April 8, 2012
In the school's Paranormal Investigations Club, Momoe Okonogi does her work, blissfully unaware of the presence of the club's ghost president, Yuuko Kanoe, who can only be seen by the two other club members Teiichi Niiya and Kirie Kanoe. After investigating an allegedly "haunted" food elevator, which is revealed to be Yuuko's doing, Momoe brings everyone to the top of a hill where a memorial to Yuuko is found. After Momoe and Kirie leave, Teiichi finds a bell underneath the memorial grave.
2	"Maiden of a Chance Meeting"; Transliteration: "Kaikō Otome" (Japanese: 邂逅乙女)	April 15, 2012
It all began when Teiichi finds himself lost in one of the school's old buildings, where he stumbles upon Yuuko whom introduces herself as the ghost of the school. While he tries to understand how she came to be, they decided to start the Paranormal Investigations Club. Momoe asks him to help her with a paranormal problem, later explaining she played a strange game called "hide-and-seek" which only ends if you reveal the doll you use, but the doll mysteriously disappeared and she fears she will be killed. In truth, the doll was actually taken by Yuuko, but she warns Teiichi that Momoe's paranoia will kill her if they do not solve it. In order to end her fear, Yuuko and Teiichi play pretend where the latter performs an exorcism on the possessed doll in front of Momoe.
3	"Maiden of Dusk"; Transliteration: "Konkoku Otome" (Japanese: 昏黒乙女)	April 22, 2012
Teiichi receives a letter referring to Yuuko, which leads him to meet Kirie. She warns him that Yuuko might be an evil spirit planning to spirit him away. As Kirie points out what is thought to be Yuuko's true form, a walking corpse, she reveals that Yuuko is her grandmother's late sister. Kirie tries to target Yuuko's remains but is scared off by Yuuko. Afterwards, Teiichi overcomes his fear and manages to reform Yuuko in his desired image. He then joins Kirie in inspecting Yuuko's corpse for clues of her past, finding a shrine near her corpse. Realizing the evil spirit is not Yuuko but something else, Kirie decides to join the Paranormal Investigations Club to get to the bottom of the mystery.
4	"Maiden of Dawn"; Transliteration: "Futsugyō Otome" (Japanese: 払暁乙女)	April 29, 2012
The Paranormal Investigations Club have a summer break sleepover at the old school building to investigate another ghost story. In truth, Kirie wants to find the evil shadow ghost she saw before. Teiichi and Yuuko spend the night together exploring the building, while she reveals two of the ghost stories of the school, the Ghost of the Old Night Duty Room and the Stone of Curses, were actual pranks by her. She later brings Teiichi to her favorite spot when seeing the sunrise, and is glad they are spending time together. Meanwhile, the shadow ghost appears before a sleeping Kirie.
5	"Maiden of Longing"; Transliteration: "Shōkei Otome" (Japanese: 憧憬乙女)	May 6, 2012
As the club prepares a haunted house for the school culture festival, Kirie becomes annoyed with Teiichi and Yuuko's friskiness and storms out with Momoe, only to get the both of them lost. As they look around the building, Momoe gets to know more about Kirie's sensitive side, and together they decide to explore the festival. Later, Kirie gets roped into a cosplay café and proves to be a hit. After the festival ends, as Kirie becomes frustrated after comparing herself to Yuuko, she enters the haunted house and sees her fears of not being able to love herself. However, she becomes relieved after she learns Teiichi's reasons for liking Yuuko and how he also sees Kirie as a girl.
6	"Maiden of Vengeance"; Transliteration: "Fukushū Otome" (Japanese: 復讐乙女)	May 13, 2012
As the school festival continues, the Paranormal Investigations Club learns about a rumor about Akahito, a masked blood-covered monster that kills anyone who stays late during school as a sacrifice. But the rumor turns out to be fact when Akahito is spotted during the festival. A student named Yuuko Kirishima claims she was attacked by Akahito, which sends the superstitious students hysteric. However, Teiichi discovers Kirishima was behind the Akahito story, as she wants to destroy ghosts stories, because the students bully her for having the same name as the ghost Yuuko. Kirishima makes a claim to her superstitious friends that the only way to stop Akahito from killing them is to sacrifice Yuuko the ghost, but paranoid and hysteric, they intend to sacrifice Kirishima, believing she and Yuuko are the same person. The club stops the superstitious students by having Yuuko disguise herself as Akahito where she chases the students out for offering the wrong sacrifice. With her ordeal over, Kirishima leaves, but not before apologizing to Yuuko. Meanwhile, Kirie and Momoe leave the bell tower after helping scare the superstitious students, until Kirie encounters the shadow ghost.
7	"Maiden of Oblivion"; Transliteration: "Bōkyaku Otome" (Japanese: 忘却乙女)	May 20, 2012
Teiichi notices Yuuko has been acting strange, as she unknowingly keeps lashing out every time he spends time with Momoe. He confides this with Kirie, who tells him she saw the shadow ghost again and concludes the shadow ghost is actually the darker half of Yuuko's literal split personality. Soon Kirie, Teiichi, and Yuuko encounter the shadow ghost, who reveals to them she is the embodiment of Yuuko's hatred and the painful memories she wanted to forget. Denying the truth, Yuuko runs away toward the Stone of Curse, and Teiichi eventually catches up to her there. As it is revealed that it is actually a memorial stone dedicated to the townsfolk who died in a plague sixty years ago, it is explained that Yuuko was offered as a living sacrifice to stop this plague. The shadow ghost makes a second appearance, unveiling that Yuuko was made as a sacrifice against her will. The next day, Yuuko continues to hang around with Teiichi, but is much more quiet. The shadow ghost possesses Yuuko and pushes Teiichi off a stairway, much to her horror. When a healed and bandaged Teiichi returns to the club room, he encounters Yuuko, who does not seem to recognize his face, much to his shock.
8	"Maiden of Recollection"; Transliteration: "Tsuioku Otome" (Japanese: 追憶乙女)	May 27, 2012
Yuuko tells Teiichi to leave her alone, believing she has forgotten him for causing her painful memories. Kirie concludes every time Yuuko experiences a painful memory, she has it removed from her mind and into her shadow. Unable to bear seeing Yuuko not recognizing him, he starts spending time with Momoe to the point where he can no longer see Yuuko. Kirie confronts him if he just going to forget Yuuko like that, when she is mysteriously pushed away from him. After talking with Momoe and reading her logbook about the Paranormal Investigations Club, Teiichi begins to remember Yuuko and his feelings for her. Wishing to bring her memories back, he rushes to the club room and drags Yuuko to her favorite spot, telling her about the times they spend together and confesses his love for her. Yuuko finally remembers who Teiichi is, and tells him she loves him as well. At the club room, Kirie finds an old picture of Yuuko when the shadow ghost arrives, realizing it was the one that pushed her away from before. But in a sudden twist, the shadow ghost asks Kirie who she is.
9	"Maiden of Hatred"; Transliteration: "Onnen Otome" (Japanese: 怨念乙女)	June 3, 2012
The shadow ghost approaches Kirie but disappears thanks to the timely arrival of Momoe. She tells about her encounter with Teiichi and Yuuko, but to Teiichi and Kirie's shock, Yuuko tells them she has never met her shadow nor does she know about the school's mysteries. They soon realize Yuuko has selectively pushed her negative memories into her shadow again, after noticing she has become more stubborn and embarrassed than before. As the Paranormal Investigations Club heads home, Yuuko feels hurt and lonely without Teiichi, having a brief flashback of her past. The shadow ghost appears before Yuuko, hating her for pushing their negative memories into her, bitterly jealous because Teiichi is in love with her. Teiichi save Yuuko before the shadow ghost tries to force her to remember more of her past. They try to escape from school but Yuuko cannot leave the school grounds. Teiichi manages to push Yuuko away from her shadow when it tries to grab the latter, but he falls unconscious as a result. When he wakes up, Teiichi finds himself seeing Yuuko's past from her body.
10	"Maiden of Defeat"; Transliteration: "Sōshitsu Otome" (Japanese: 喪失乙女)	June 10, 2012
Teiichi experiences Yuuko's life sixty years ago, where she lived with her sister, Yukariko Kanoe, who is Kirie's grandmother. Despite a plague killing the townsfolk, Yuuko continued taking care of Asa, a young girl whose family was killed by the plague, believing everything will get better. However, Yuuko and Yukariko eavesdrop on a meeting between the sick town elders, whom believe the plague was punishment by the gods for building the school over a destroyed shrine. To appease the gods, the elders plan to sacrifice a young child and cover it up by claiming the child was another victim of the plague. Fearing for Asa's safety, Yuuko and Yukariko bring her into their home, but Asa is kidnapped when the sisters went bathing, which Yuuko runs to the school to save her. Asa, who is forced by the elders to play the role of Akahito to choose a sacrifice, unknowingly chooses Yuuko. The hysterical elders grab Yuuko and throw her into the underground shrine, sealing the entrance. As she slowly bleeds from a broken leg and her cries for help unanswered, Yuuko dies peacefully, refusing to blame anyone for her fate, glad to know Asa and Yukariko were safe. However, this leads to the birth of Yuuko's shadow, who hates her for not blaming anyone, including the elders for her death and herself becoming a ghost with no memories of her past.
11	"Maiden of Bitter Tears"; Transliteration: "Kōrui Otome" (Japanese: 紅涙乙女)	June 17, 2012
Teiichi wakes up from his dream of Yuuko's past to find that almost no time has passed in the present. Upon touching Teiichi's hand, the memories he now has of her resurface, and Yuuko is unable to see or hear him. Teiichi feels like giving up but is slapped by Kirie for trying to forget about Yuuko. As he communicate with Yuuko via the club's logbook, Teiichi gets an idea thanks to Momoe where he asks Kirie to let him see Yukariko, who is the chairman of the school. Yukariko reveals to Teiichi that she too can see the shadow ghost as well as the elders that died from madness after seeing it. Armed with this knowledge, Teiichi manages to make Yuuko see him again by getting her attention by vandalizing the club room which also attracts the shadow ghost. Teiichi reveals to Yuuko's shadow that he saw the past when he touched her, but she angrily confronts him on how can he understand the pain and suffering she had. Teiichi admits watching what happened to her and unable to do anything hurt him very much. Despite that, he accepts both the ghost maiden and her shadow as they are both the same girl he loves. Both personas reconcile with each other and become one, accepting both their good and bad memories. Later, Teiichi reveals, from what Yukariko told him, that Asa is his grandmother. With joy, Yuuko declares that her sacrifice was not in vain because thanks to it, she could meet him.
12	"The Dusk Maiden"; Transliteration: "Tasogare Otome" (Japanese: 黄昏乙女)	June 24, 2012
Winter arrives and the Paranormal Investigations Club learns that Yukariko has found her sister's body and has given it a proper burial. With the club room shut down until the school can move the shrine out from the basement, Yuuko has Teiichi go on date around the school with her. Teiichi wonders why Yuuko is so insistent on this date until he learns the truth that because her hatred, the regret that kept her soul staying on Earth, has been resolved, her spirit is passing on to the afterlife. As they both spends their last moments together in the club room, Teiichi tearfully says goodbye and kisses Yuuko before she finally departs. As the new school terms begins in the spring, the club learns the school's old building will not be demolished due to its historic value. Teiichi heads to the club room and much to his surprise and joy, Yuuko returns as her last kiss with him made her regret having to leave him and she is now bound to him.
13	"Maiden of Exorcism"; Transliteration: "Taima Otome" (Japanese: 退魔乙女)	November 28, 2012 (DVD Release)
Tired of Yuuko's antics for causing more ghost stories to be spread among the students, Kirie challenges her to a series of games which if Yuuko loses, she must behave. To Kirie's anger, Yuuko wins the contest. Momoe shows an old letter she found which contains ghost stories which predate Yuuko's enrollment in the school to the Paranormal Investigations Club. The club decides investigate the stories one by one which leads to many funny moments and embarrassments for everyone. After investigating the haunted bath story, the club discovers that the letter was written in invisible ink by the "Paranormal Investigations Club". Momoe then realizes that the stories were written by the original Paranormal Investigations Club for fun before they became the third newspaper club. Realizing that they are just like their predecessors, Teiichi and the girls decide to wear yukatas and set off fireworks on the school rooftops that night.

== Reception ==
Rebecca Silverman of Anime News Network (ANN) reviewed the first half of the series in 2012. Despite finding Momoe Okonogi a nuisance for ruining some of the show's dramatic moments, she praised the different art styles used throughout the episodes and the various supernatural elements that carry an atmospheric tone, saying that "On the whole, Dusk maiden of Amnesia is greater than the sum of its parts." Fellow ANN editor Theron Martin reviewed the complete anime series in 2013. While finding problems with the plot wrapping up too quickly and some minor artistic flubs, Martin praised the series for melding different genre elements seamlessly, its mood-setting musical score and its handling of the main cast, saying that "In all, the anime adaptation of Dusk maiden of Amnesia is a good example of economy of action." Allen Moody from THEM Anime Reviews was at arms length with the series at first with its harem elements and "gratuitous fanservice", but came to appreciate the supernatural horror aesthetics used throughout the scenes and the female cast for having distinguished artwork and character development, concluding that: "Overall, this is not a great series, but it is often an interesting one, and the ladies are only occasionally required to surrender their dignity, for which I am very grateful."

== See also ==
- To the Abandoned Sacred Beasts, another manga series by the same creator
- Tales of Wedding Rings, another manga series by the same creator
