= Shin Oonuma =

Japanese animation director

Shin Oonuma 大沼 心
- Born: March 8, 1976 (age 50); Tokyo, Japan
- Occupations: Animator, director, storyboard artist
- Years active: 1997–present
- Employer(s): Office AO (1997–2003); Shaft (2004–2009); Silver Link (2010–present)
- Known for: Negima!? Ef: A Tale of Memories; Fate/kaleid liner Prisma Illya

Shin Oonuma (Japanese: 大沼 心, Hepburn: Ōnuma Shin; born March 8, 1976) is a Japanese anime director, animator, and storyboard artist best known for his contributions to studios Shaft and Silver Link.

== Early life ==
As a child, Oonuma did not care much for anime and found more interest in video games. He watched some parts of Mobile Suit Gundam while in elementary school without understanding it, and vividly remembered parts of a Gamba no Bouken rerun because of a weasel character he was terrified by, but otherwise was obsessed Famicom that was released around that time. It wasn't until late in high school that Oonuma watched various anime. Since he loved games, he was vaguely interested in going into the entertainment industry, so he watched anime as a part of that idea. This led to Oonuma's discovery of the 1992 OVA Tenchi Muyo! Ryo-Ohki, which resonated with him through its characters, comedy style, and in particular the nature of its protagonist who is teased at the beginning of the story but essentially becomes a hero by its end. Tenchi Muyo! inspired Oonuma to join the anime industry. Up until that point, Oonuma avoided drawing because his mother was a former manga artist and illustrator and his older brother was a good artist, and Oonuma didn't like being compared; but Tenchi Muyo was the first time he thought about drawing and making the pictures move through animation himself.

== Career ==
Oonuma's first credit in anime was as an in-between animator for Berserk as a sub-contracting employee of Office AO. He continued working with Office AO, and in 2003 made his debut as an episode director on Nurse Me! and Triangle Hearts ~Sweet Songs Forever~ under the series direction of Akiyuki Shinbo. The following year, he was invited alongside Tatsuya Oishi by Shinbo to join Shaft, and the three became known as Team Shinbo. According to Oonuma, Shinbo had invited him to Shaft due to Oonuma's understanding of digital compositing and processing, which he had showcased on Triangle Hearts. Their first project with Shaft was Tsukuyomi: Moon Phase, and Oonuma's liking of the "moe" aesthetic and "gal games" lead to him being particularly helpful to Shinbo on the series, who admitted to having no understanding of the "moe" aesthetics of Tsukuyomi. A majority of Shaft's productions from 2004 to 2009 were subsequently directed by the three, with Shinbo taking an executive role at the studio, and Oonuma and Oishi doing most of the hands-on directorial work. Oonuma was put in charge of overseeing Pani Poni Dash in 2005 and Negima!? in 2006. In 2007, Oonuma debuted as a director on his own with Ef: A Tale of Memories, with Shinbo participating as a supervisor. According to Oonuma, Shinbo's role as supervisor had him look over and assist with the screenplay and storyboards, but otherwise Oonuma was given complete freedom with the adaptation. Oonuma felt that Shinbo's greatest contribution was overseeing the storyboards to episode 2 and, with the reveal of Shindo's memory disorder, his recommendation during the editing stage that the direction of that scene correlate to the way the scene was directed, which Oonuma said broadly influenced his directing style. In 2009, Oonuma left Shaft to pursue work with Silver Link. At Silver Link, Oonuma has taken a similar role to Shinbo's executive role at Shaft. He has been involved with most of the studio's productions as either director or chief director, and has mentored or influenced several directors including Masato Jinbo, Masafumi Tamura, Keisuke Inoue, and Mirai Minato.

=== Style ===
Since his time with the studio, Oonuma's directing style has been consistently compared to his former Shaft colleagues. ANN reviewer Carl Kimlinger, in his reviews of both seasons of Baka and Test, noted Oonuma's visual cues, which he seemed to take from his time under Akiyuki Shinbo; in comparison to Shinbo's "directorial madman" approach, Kimlinger described Oonuma's direction as being "semi-abstract" and "light"; Nick Creamer, reviewing C3, noted Oonuma's emphasis on "wildly creative" visuals, reminiscent of his previous series; and Theron Martin mentioned the similarities between Dusk Maiden of Amnesia and Ef. Despite the many analyses of Oonuma's style, Creamer later stated, in his review of the first episode of The Ones Within, that a single directorial style could not be attached to Oonuma, and that his visual style was more likely the result of visual experimentation for the sake of visual experimentation than any particular style of choice.

Initially, while he worked on Pani Poni Dash, Oonuma stated that he did not know how to make a comedy using gags since he had never done one until that point but became more interested in it upon viewing Yasuo Ejima's fourth episode of the series. After he saw Tatsuya Oishi's sixth episode of the series, Oonuma decided to take things he believed were interesting and make them his own. Oonuma also started to work closely with the animation staff, whom he consulted with on how to make certain the storyboards and other parts of the production better, and would ask them to add their own ideas into the work. Although only a key animator at the time, Oonuma specifically consulted with later Shaft director Naoyuki Tatsuwa regarding some of the series' parodies and references as Tatsuwa was knowledgeable on how to implement them, for example. Oonuma developed his sense of style in tandem with the creators around him, as opposed to Oishi's self-indulgence as a director in which he made his own references and parodies away from what he described as the Oonuma team.

The most influential aspect of Shinbo's directing style on Oonuma, according to himself, was Shinbo's taste in colors in his works. Although Shinbo had, at this time, shifted away from using abnormal coloring, Oonuma noted that it was the "power of color" that he had been mostly influenced by while working with Shinbo. Speaking strictly on Oonuma's debut as a solo-director on Ef: A Tale of Memories, Shinbo noted that Oonuma would contrast close-ups of happy faces with long and sad lines from the characters (and vice versa). He considered his personal philosophy at the time to be storytelling through the pictures on the screen rather than the voices of the characters. For Natsu no Arashi!, Shinbo asked Oonuma to come up with a unique way of portraying the hot summer. After talking with the background team, Oonuma decided to use a high-contrast lighting style to emphasize the power of the sun's lighting. The shape of the lighting, however, which appears in certain shapes, was an idea Shinbo had used occasionally in prior instances, which was influenced by art director Yuuji Ikeda's work on Marude Dameo (which Shinbo worked on as an episode director). Oonuma stated that he doesn't give detailed instructions to either the cast or staff of his works, and instead develops the project around a single guideline by which all of the staff can move around and understand. In adapting works to the anime medium, he takes time trying to appeal to the intentions of the original author and the expectations of the viewers, so as to please both the audience and the creator of the work.

== Works ==
=== Television series ===
In "Director(s)" column highlights Oonuma's directorial works.

| Year | Title | Director(s) | Studio | SB (Note: Storyboard artist.) | ED (Note: Episode director, equivalent to unit director.) | Other roles and notes | Ref(s) |
|---|---|---|---|---|---|---|---|
| 1997 | Berserk | Naohito Takahashi | OLM | No | No | In-between animator | |
| 1998 | Silent Mobius | Hideki Tonokatsu | Shaft (Radix) | No | No | Key animator | |
| 2001 | A Little Snow Fairy Sugar | Shinichiro Kimura | J.C.Staff | No | No | Key animator | |
| 2002 | G-On Riders | Shinichiro Kimura | Shaft; TNK | No | No | Key animator | |
| 2003 | Twin Spica | Tomomi Mochizuki | Group TAC | No | Yes | | |
| 2004 | Wind: A Breath of Heart | Mitsuhiro Tōgō | Radix | No | Yes | | |
| 2004 | Tsukuyomi: Moon Phase | Akiyuki Shinbo (chief) | Shaft | Yes | Yes | Assistant episode director Opening director Key animator | |
| 2005 | Paniponi Dash! | Akiyuki Shinbo; Shin Oonuma (chief) | Shaft | Yes | Yes | Ending animation Supervisor | |
| 2005 | Akahori Gedou Hour Rabuge | Hitoyuki Matsui | Radix | No | No | Key animator | |
| 2006 | Negima!? | Akiyuki Shinbo; Shin Oonuma (chief) | Shaft | Yes | Yes | | |
| 2007 | Hidamari Sketch | Akiyuki Shinbo (chief); Ryouki Kamitsubo (chief) | Shaft | No | No | Opening director | |
| 2007 | Ef: A Tale of Memories | Shin Oonuma | Shaft | Yes | Yes | Opening director and storyboard 2nd key animator | |
| 2008 | Hidamari Sketch x 365 | Akiyuki Shinbo | Shaft | No | Yes | Opening director | |
| 2008 | Bakemonogatari | Akiyuki Shinbo; Tatsuya Oishi (series) | Shaft | No | Yes | Opening director | |
| 2008 | Ef: A Tale of Melodies | Shin Oonuma | Shaft | Yes | Yes | Opening director and storyboard | |
| 2009 | Natsu no Arashi! | Akiyuki Shinbo; Shin Oonuma (series) | Shaft | Yes | Yes | Opening director Ending director | |
| 2009 | Natsu no Arashi! Akinai-chū | Akiyuki Shinbo; Shin Oonuma (series) | Shaft | Yes | Yes | Series director for 7 episodes Opening director Ending director | |
| 2010 | Baka and Test | Shin Oonuma | Silver Link | Yes | Yes | Opening director and storyboard Ending director and storyboard | |
| 2011 | Baka and Test 2 | Shin Oonuma | Silver Link | Yes | Yes | Opening director and storyboard Ending director and storyboard Screenplay | |
| 2011 | C3 | Shin Oonuma | Silver Link | Yes | No | Opening director and storyboard | |
| 2011 | Level E | Toshiyuki Katō | Pierrot; David Production | Yes | No | | |
| 2012 | Dusk Maiden of Amnesia | Shin Oonuma; Takashi Sakamoto (series) | Silver Link | Yes | Yes | | |
| 2012 | Kokoro Connect | Shin Oonuma (chief); Shinya Kawatsura | Silver Link | No | No | | |
| 2012 | OniAi | Keiichiro Kawaguchi | Silver Link | Yes | No | | |
| 2013 | No Matter How I Look at It, It's You Guys' Fault I'm Not Popular! | Shin Oonuma | Silver Link | Yes | Yes | Opening director and storyboard Ending director and storyboard | |
| 2013 | Fate/kaleid liner Prisma Illya | Shin Oonuma (chief); Mirai Minato (chief); Takashi Sakamoto | Silver Link | Yes | No | | |
| 2013 | Monogatari Series Second Season | Akiyuki Shinbo (chief); Tomoyuki Itamura | Shaft | No | No | Opening director | |
| 2014 | No-Rin | Shin Oonuma | Silver Link | Yes | Yes | Opening director and storyboard Ending director and storyboard Ending photography | |
| 2014 | Fate/kaleid liner Prisma Illya 2wei! | Shin Oonuma (chief); Masato Jinbo | Silver Link | No | No | | |
| 2014 | Invaders of the Rokujouma!? | Shin Oonuma; Jin Tamamura (series) | Silver Link | Yes | No | Opening director and storyboard | |
| 2015 | Chivalry of a Failed Knight | Shin Oonuma; Jin Tamamura (series) | Silver Link; Nexus | Yes | Yes | Opening director and storyboard | |
| 2015 | Fate/kaleid liner Prisma Illya 2wei Herz! | Shin Oonuma (chief); Masato Jinbo | Silver Link | No | No | | |
| 2015 | Chaos Dragon | Hideki Tachibana (chief); Masato Matsune | Silver Link; Connect | Yes | No | | |
| 2016 | Anne Happy | Shin Oonuma | Silver Link | Yes | Yes | Opening director and storyboard | |
| 2016 | Fate/kaleid liner Prisma Illya 3rei! | Shin Oonuma (chief); Masato Jinbo; Ken Takahashi | Silver Link | No | No | | |
| 2016 | Magic of Stella | Shinya Kawatsura | Silver Link | Yes | No | | |
| 2017 | A Sister's All You Need | Shin Oonuma; Jin Tamamura (series) | Silver Link | No | No | Opening director and storyboard | |
| 2018 | Death March to the Parallel World Rhapsody | Shin Oonuma | Silver Link; Connect | Yes | No | | |
| 2018 | Miss Caretaker of Sunohara-sou | Shin Oonuma (chief); Mirai Minato | Silver Link | No | No | Opening director and storyboard | |
| 2018 | Butlers: Chitose Momotose Monogatari | Ken Takahashi | Silver Link | Yes | Yes | | |
| 2018 | The Girl in Twilight (#12) | Jin Tamamura; Yūichi Abe (series) | Dandelion Animation Studio; Okuruto Noboru | Yes | No | | |
| 2019 | The Ones Within | Shin Oonuma | Silver Link | Yes | Yes | Opening director Ending director and storyboard | |
| 2020 | Bofuri | Shin Oonuma; Mirai Minato | Silver Link | No | Yes | | |
| 2020 | The Misfit of Demon King Academy | Shin Oonuma (chief); Masafumi Tamura | Silver Link | No | No | Opening director and storyboard | |
| 2020 | Our Last Crusade or the Rise of a New World | Shin Oonuma; Mirai Minato | Silver Link | No | No | | |
| 2021 | Deep Insanity: The Lost Child | Shin Oonuma | Silver Link | Yes | No | Opening director and storyboard | |
| 2023 | Bofuri 2nd Season | Shin Oonuma | Silver Link | No | No | Opening director and storyboard | |
| 2023 | The Misfit of Demon King Academy 2nd Season | Shin Oonuma (chief); Masafumi Tamura | Silver Link | Yes | Yes | Opening director and storyboard | |
| 2023 | Ragna Crimson | Ken Takahashi | Silver Link | No | Yes | Opening director and storyboard | |
| 2025 | Princession Orchestra | Shin Oonuma | Silver Link | Yes | Yes | Opening director and storyboard | |
| 2027 | Fate/kaleid liner Prisma Illya Finale | Shin Oonuma; Ken Takahashi (series) | Silver Link | TBA | TBA | TBA | |
| 2027 | Re:bel Robotica | Shin Oonuma (chief); Kōki Onoue | Silver Link | TBA | TBA | TBA | |

=== OVAs ===
| Year | Title | Director(s) | Studio | SB | ED | Other roles and notes | Ref(s) |
|---|---|---|---|---|---|---|---|
| 2000 | Luv Wave | Katsuma Kanazawa | Triple X | No | No | Key animator | |
| 2002 | Mazinkaiser | Masahiko Murata | Brain's Base | No | No | Key animator | |
| 2003 | Nurse Me! | Akiyuki Shinbo | AT-2 (Note: AT-2 was a hentai label pseudonym of studio Arcturus, a subsidiary of Seven Arcs.) | No | Yes | | |
| 2003 | Triangle Hearts ~Sweet Songs Forever~ | Akiyuki Shinbo | Seven Arcs | Yes | Yes | | |
| 2004 | Hourglass of Summer | Takahiro Okao | Rikuentai | Yes | Yes | | |
| 2006 | Negima!? Magister Negi Magi: Spring | Akiyuki Shinbo (chief); Shin Oonuma | Shaft | No | Yes | | |
| 2006 | Negima!? Magister Negi Magi: Summer | Akiyuki Shinbo (chief); Shin Oonuma | Shaft | No | No | Ending animation | |
| 2008 | Shina Dark | Shin Oonuma; Shinpei Tomooka; Naoyuki Konno; Toshimasa Suzuki | Shaft | No | No | | |
| 2008 | Mahō Sensei Negima!: Shiroki Tsubasa Ala Alba | Akiyuki Shinbo (chief); Various | Shaft; Studio Pastoral | No | No | Ending animation | |
| 2009 | Pani Poni Dash! | Akiyuki Shinbo; Shin Oonuma (series) | Shaft | No | No | | |
| 2009 | Mahō Sensei Negima!: Mō Hitotsu no Sekai | Akiyuki Shinbo (chief); Various | Shaft; Studio Pastoral | No | No | Ending animation | |
| 2011 | Baka and Test: Matsuri | Shin Oonuma | Silver Link | Yes | No | Ending storyboard | |
| 2012 | C3 | Shin Oonuma | Silver Link | No | No | | |
| 2012 | Dusk Maiden of Amnesia | Shin Oonuma; Takashi Sakamoto (series) | Silver Link | No | No | | |
| 2014 | Fate/kaleid liner Prisma Illya | Shin Oonuma (chief); Mirai Minato (chief); Takashi Sakamoto | Silver Link | No | No | | |
| 2014 | No Matter How I Look at It, It's You Guys' Fault I'm Not Popular! | Shin Oonuma | Silver Link | No | No | | |
| 2015 | Fate/kaleid liner Prisma Illya 2wei! | Shin Oonuma (chief); Masato Jinbo | Silver Link | No | No | | |
| 2018 | Masamune-kun's Revenge | Mirai Minato | Silver Link | No | Yes | | |
| 2018 | Strike the Blood III | Hideyo Yamamoto | Connect | No | No | Opening director, storyboard, and key animator Ending director, storyboard, and key animator | |
| 2019 | Fate/kaleid liner Prisma Illya: Prisma Phantasm | Shin Oonuma | Silver Link | No | No | | |
| 2020 | The Ones Within | Shin Oonuma | Silver Link | No | No | | |

=== Films ===
| Year | Title | Director(s) | Studio | SB | ED | Other roles and notes | Ref(s) |
|---|---|---|---|---|---|---|---|
| 2017 | Fate/kaleid liner Prisma Illya: Vow in the Snow | Shin Oonuma | Silver Link | Yes | Yes | | |
| 2021 | Fate/kaleid liner Prisma Illya: Licht - The Nameless Girl | Shin Oonuma | Silver Link | Yes | Yes | | |

== Notes ==
=== Works cited ===
- Shinbo, Akiyuki (2012). 新房語 [Shinbogatari] (in Japanese). Ichijinsha. ISBN 978-4758012591.
- Takahashi, Yumi, ed. (2019). Akiyuki Shimbo x Shaft Chronicle (in Japanese). Dotcom. ISBN 978-4835457017.
- Maeda, Hisashi; Hiraiwa, Shinsuke (2007). アニメ新表現宣言！新房監督作品の奥にアニメ表現の最先端を見た！ [Declaration of a New Expression for Anime! I saw the Cutting Edge of Anime Expression in Director Shinbo's Work!] (in Japanese). Tamon Creative.
