= Silver Link =

Japanese animation studio

Silver Link, Inc.

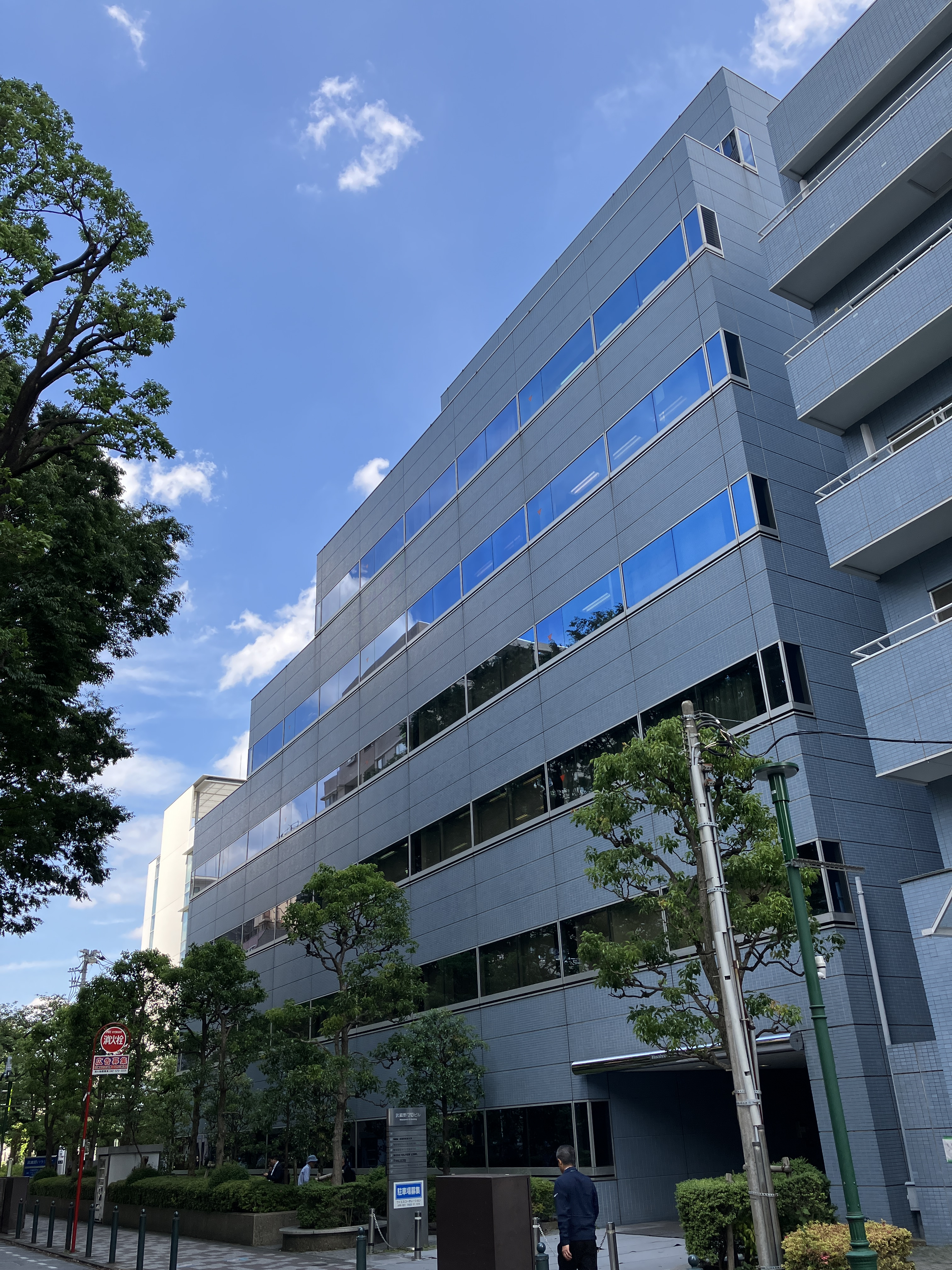
- Musashino YS Building, where the head office is located
- Native name: 株式会社シルバーリンク
- Romanized name: Kabushiki-gaisha Shirubā Rinku
- Type: Kabushiki gaisha
- Industry: Japanese animation
- Founded: December 2007; 18 years ago (Silver Link Asset Management Co., Ltd.); October 2020; 6 years ago (Silver Link, Inc.)
- Founder: Hayato Kaneko
- Headquarters: Nakacho, Musashino, Tokyo, Japan
- Key people: Yukihiro Sugitani (Note: 3rd President and CEO (代表取締役社長).); Akira Tanaka (Note: Senior managing director (専務取締役).); Kazuya Shiraishi (Note: Board member (取締役)); Minemichi Hasegawa; Jirou Nakagawa (Note: Executive officer (執行役員).); Masao Ootsuki
- Number of employees: 160
- Parent: ABC Animation
- Divisions: Connect; Silver Link Overseas Division
- Website: www.silverlink.co.jp

Silver Link, Inc. (株式会社シルバーリンク, Kabushiki-gaisha Shirubā Rinku; stylized as SILVER LINK.) is a Japanese animation studio. It was founded by ex-Frontline animation producer Hayato Kaneko in December 2007 and is based in Tokyo.

== History ==
After the company's establishment in 2007, Shin Oonuma, who was previously a director alongside Shaft directors Akiyuki Shinbo and Tatsuya Oishi, joined the studio. A majority of Silver Link's productions have involved Oonuma as a director or co-director since his joining of the studio. The company had also owned two subsidiaries: Beep Co., Ltd., a subcontracting animation studio, and Connect, Inc., a studio that started off co-producing series with Silver Link, and has since expanded into producing its own works. Both subsidiaries have since been dissolved by the studio, though they both still continue to operate as divisions within the company.

On February 1, 2016, Beep was absorbed into Silver Link, and was succeeded by Silver Link Overseas Division, taking over Beep's former office space. However, the Beep brand still remains in use for sub-contracting work by the studio.

On July 17, 2020, it was announced that Silver Link would be wholly absorbing and dissolving Connect, and that all rights managed by the company would be transferred to Silver Link. However, Connect will still continue to operate as a sub-studio within Silver Link.

On August 3, 2020, it was announced that Asahi Broadcasting Group Holdings had acquired Silver Link for 250 million yen.

On October 1, 2020, the company changed its name to Silver Link Asset Management Co., Ltd. and split off its animation production business into a new company named Silver Link, Inc.

On October 5, 2023, it was announced that ABC Group Holdings had moved the company under ABC Animation as a wholly owned subsidiary.

On November 6, 2023, the studio relocated from its headquarters on the second, third, and fourth floor of the Marusho Mitaka Building in Shimorenjaku, Mitaka, Tokyo, to the third floor of the Musashino YS Building — where Wit Studio and Tatsunoko Production are also headquartered — in Nakachou, Musashino, Tokyo.

On September 26, 2024, Silver Link. Asset Management disappeared as a corporate entity.

=== Representative staff ===
==== Current ====
- Yukihiro Sugitani (3rd CEO)
- Akira Tanaka (Board member)
- Kazuya Shiraishi (Board member)
- Minemichi Hasegawa (Board member)
- Jirou Nakagawa (Executive officer)
- Masao Oohashi (Executive officer)

==== Former ====
- Hayato Kaneko (Board member, 1st CEO)
- Tomoaki Asano (2nd CEO)
- Akihiro Ueda (Board member)
- Akihiro Hayashi (Board member)
- Kazuhiko Ogura (Board member)
- Tomoaki Hagiwara (Board member)
- Ryou Kimura (Board member)
- Masahiro Tabeya (Executive officer)

== Works ==
=== Television series ===
Year	Title	Director(s)	Eps	Note(s)	Ref(s)
2009	Tayutama: Kiss on my Deity	Keitaro Motonaga	12	Adaptation of the visual novel by Lump of Sugar.	
2010	Baka & Test - Summon the Beasts	Shin Oonuma	13	Adaptation of the light novel series written by Kenji Inoue.	
2011	Baka & Test - Summon the Beasts 2	Shin Oonuma	13	Sequel to Baka & Test - Summon the Beasts.	
2011	C³	Shin Oonuma	12	Adaptation of the light novel series written by Hazuki Minase.	
2012	Dusk Maiden of Amnesia	Shin Oonuma; Takashi Sakamoto	12	Adaptation of the manga series by Maybe.	
2012	Chitose Get You!!	Takao Sano	26	Adaptation of the yonkoma manga series by Etsuya Mashima.	
2012	Kokoro Connect	Shin Oonuma; Shinya Kawatsura	13	Adaptation of the light novel series written by Sadanatsu Anda.	
2012	OniAi	Keiichiro Kawaguchi	12	Adaptation of the light novel series written by Daisuke Suzuki.	
2012	Kokoro Connect: Michi Random	Shin Oonuma; Shinya Kawatsura	4	The final four episodes of Kokoro Connect.	
2013	WataMote	Shin Oonuma	12	Adaptation of the manga series by Nico Tanigawa.	
2013	Fate/kaleid liner Prisma Illya	Shin Oonuma; Takashi Sakamoto; Mirai Minato	10	Adaptation of the manga series by Hiroshi Hiroyama.	
2013	Strike the Blood	Takao Sano; Hideyo Yamamoto	24	Adaptation of the light novel series by Gakuto Mikumo. Co-produced with Connect. (2013–14)	
2013	Non Non Biyori	Shinya Kawatsura	12	Adaptation of the manga series by Atto.	
2014	No-Rin	Shin Oonuma	12	Adaptation of the light novel series written by Shirow Shiratori.	
2014	Fate/kaleid liner Prisma Illya 2wei!	Shin Oonuma; Masato Jinbo	10	Sequel to Fate/kaleid liner Prisma Illya.	
2014	Invaders of the Rokujyōma!?	Shin Oonuma; Jin Tamamura	12	Adaptation of the light novel series written by Takehaya.	
2014	Girl Friend Beta	Naotaka Hayashi	12	Based on the smartphone game by CyberAgent.	
2015	Yurikuma Arashi	Kunihiko Ikuhara	12	Original work.	
2015	Chaos Dragon	Hideki Tachibana; Masato Matsune	12	Based on the Red Dragon role-playing game. Co-produced with Connect.	
2015	Non Non Biyori Repeat	Shinya Kawatsura	12	Sequel to Non Non Biyori.	
2015	Fate/kaleid liner Prisma Illya 2wei Herz!	Shin Oonuma; Masato Jinbo	10	Sequel to Fate/kaleid liner Prisma Illya 2wei!.	
2015	Chivalry of a Failed Knight	Shin Oonuma; Jin Tamamura	12	Adaptation of the light novel series by Riku Misora. Co-produced with Nexus.	
2015	Shomin Sample	Masato Jinbo	12	Adaptation of the light novel series by Takafumi Nanatsuki.	
2015	Anti-Magic Academy: The 35th Test Platoon	Tomoyuki Kawamura	12	Adaptation of the light novel series written by Tōki Yanagimi.	
2016	Anne Happy	Shin Oonuma	12	Adaptation of the manga series by Cotoji.	
2016	Tanaka-kun Is Always Listless	Shinya Kawatsura	12	Adaptation of the manga series by Nozomi Uda.	
2016	Fate/kaleid liner Prisma Illya 3rei!	Shin Oonuma; Masato Jinbo; Ken Takahashi	12	Sequel to Fate/kaleid liner Prisma Illya 2wei Herz!.	
2016	Ange Vierge	Masafumi Tamura	12	Based on the trading card game by Kadokawa and Sega. Co-produced with Connect.	
2016	Magic of Stella	Shinya Kawatsura	12	Adaptation of the yonkoma manga series by Cloba.U.	
2016	Brave Witches	Kazuhiro Takamura	12	A spin-off of Strike Witches.	
2017	Masamune-kun's Revenge	Mirai Minato	12	Adaptation of the manga series by Hazuki Takeoka.	
2017	Chaos;Child	Masato Jinbo	12	Adaptation of the Chaos;Child visual novel by 5pb	
2017	Armed Girl's Machiavellism	Hideki Tachibana	12	Adaptation of the manga series by Yūya Kurokami. Co-produced with Connect.	
2017	Battle Girl High School	Noriaki Akitaya; Kazuo Miyake	12	Based on the social network game by COLOPL.	
2017	Restaurant to Another World	Masato Jinbo	12	Adaptation of the light novel series written by Junpei Inuzuka.	
2017	Two Car	Masafumi Tamura	12	Original work.	
2017	A Sister's All You Need	Shin Oonuma; Jin Tamamura	12	Adaptation of the light novel series written by Yomi Hirasaka.	
2018	Mitsuboshi Colors	Tomoyuki Kawamura	12	Adaptation of the manga series by Katsuwo.	
2018	Death March to the Parallel World Rhapsody	Shin Oonuma	12	Adaptation of the light novel series written by Hiro Ainana. Co-produced with Connect.	
2018	Butlers: Chitose Momotose Monogatari	Ken Takahashi	12	Original work.	
2018	Miss Caretaker of Sunohara-sou	Shin Oonuma; Mirai Minato	12	Adaptation of the yonkoma manga series by Nekoume.	
2019	Circlet Princess	Hideki Tachibana	12	Based on the browser game by DMM Games.	
2019	Ao-chan Can't Study!	Keisuke Inoue	12	Adaptation of the manga series by Ren Kawahara.	
2019	Wise Man's Grandchild	Masafumi Tamura	12	Adaptation of the light novel series written by Tsuyoshi Yoshioka.	
2019	The Ones Within	Shin Oonuma	12	Adaptation of the manga series by Osora.	
2020	Bofuri	Shin Oonuma; Mirai Minato	12	Adaptation of the light novel series written by Yuumikan.	
2020	My Next Life as a Villainess: All Routes Lead to Doom!	Keisuke Inoue	12	Adaptation of the light novel series written by Satoru Yamaguchi.	
2020	The Misfit of Demon King Academy	Shin Oonuma; Masafumi Tamura	13	Adaptation of the light novel series written by Shu.	
2020	Our Last Crusade or the Rise of a New World	Shin Oonuma; Mirai Minato	12	Adaptation of the light novel series written by Kei Sazane.	
2021	Non Non Biyori Nonstop	Shinya Kawatsura	12	Sequel to Non Non Biyori Vacation.	
2021	My Next Life as a Villainess: All Routes Lead to Doom! X	Keisuke Inoue	12	Sequel to My Next Life as a Villainess: All Routes Lead to Doom!.	
2021	The Dungeon of Black Company	Mirai Minato	12	Adaptation of the manga series by Yōhei Yasumura.	
2021	The Great Jahy Will Not Be Defeated!	Mirai Minato	20	Adaptation of the manga series by Wakame Konbu.	
2021	The World's Finest Assassin Gets Reincarnated in Another World as an Aristocrat	Masafumi Tamura	12	Adaptation of the light novel series written by Rui Tsukuyo. Co-produced with Studio Palette.	
2021	Deep Insanity: The Lost Child	Shin Oonuma	12	Based on the smartphone game by Square Enix.	
2022	The Greatest Demon Lord Is Reborn as a Typical Nobody	Mirai Minato	12	Adaptation of the light novel series written by Myōjin Katō. Co-produced with Blade.	
2022	When Will Ayumu Make His Move?	Mirai Minato	12	Adaptation of the manga series by Sōichirō Yamamoto.	
2022	The Maid I Hired Recently Is Mysterious	Mirai Minato; Misuzu Hoshino	11	Adaptation of the manga series by Wakame Konbu. Co-produced with Blade.	
2023	Bofuri 2nd Season	Shin Oonuma	12	Sequel to Bofuri.	
2023	The Misfit of Demon King Academy 2nd Season	Shin Oonuma; Masafumi Tamura	24	Sequel to The Misfit of Demon King Academy.	
2023	Level 1 Demon Lord and One Room Hero	Keisuke Inoue	12	Adaptation of the manga series by toufu. Co-produced with Blade.	
2023	Masamune-kun's Revenge R	Mirai Minato	12	Sequel to Masamune-kun's Revenge.	
2023	Ragna Crimson	Ken Takahashi	24	Adaptation of the manga series by Daiki Kobayashi.	
2023	Tearmoon Empire	Yūshi Ibe	12	Adaptation of the light novel series written by Nozomu Mochitsuki.	
2024	Sasaki and Peeps	Mirai Minato	12	Adaptation of the light novel series written by Buncololi.	
2024	Hokkaido Gals Are Super Adorable!	Mirai Minato; Misuzu Hoshino	12	Adaptation of the manga series by Kai Ikada. Co-produced with Blade.	
2024	Mission: Yozakura Family	Mirai Minato	27	Adaptation of the manga series by Hitsuji Gondaira.	
2024	Our Last Crusade or the Rise of a New World Season II	Yuki Inaba	12	Sequel to Our Last Crusade or the Rise of a New World. Co-produced with Studio Palette.	
2025	Princession Orchestra	Shin Oonuma	48	Original work.	
2025	April Showers Bring May Flowers	Mirai Minato	13	Adaptation of the manga series by Roku Sakura.	
2026	The Case Book of Arne	Keisuke Inoue	12	Based on the mystery game by Harumurasaki.	
2026	Mission: Yozakura Family 2nd Season	Mirai Minato; Takahiro Nakatsugawa	TBA	Sequel to Mission: Yozakura Family.	
2026	Sasaki and Peeps 2nd Season	Yūshi Ibe	TBA	Sequel to Sasaki and Peeps.	
2027	The World's Finest Assassin Gets Reincarnated in Another World as an Aristocrat 2nd Season	Masafumi Tamura	TBA	Sequel to The World's Finest Assassin Gets Reincarnated in Another World as an Aristocrat.	
2027	Fate/kaleid liner Prisma Illya Finale	Shin Oonuma; Ken Takahashi	TBA	Sequel to Fate/kaleid liner Prisma Illya: Licht - The Nameless Girl.	
2027	Re:bel Robotica	Shin Oonuma; Kōki Onoue	TBA	Based on the mixed-media project by Mika Pikazo and Arch.	
TBA	Our Last Crusade or the Rise of a New World Season III	Yuki Inaba	TBA	Sequel to Our Last Crusade or the Rise of a New World Season II. Co-produced with Studio Palette.	

=== OVA/ONAs ===
Year	Title	Director(s)	Eps	Note(s)	Ref(s)
2011	Baka to Test to Shōkanjū: Matsuri	Shin Oonuma	2		
2012	Kyō no Asuka Show	Masashi Kudo	20	Adaptation of the manga series by Taishi Mori. (2012–13)	
2012	Otome wa Boku ni Koishiteru: Futari no Elder	Shinya Kawatsura	3	Based on the adult visual novel by Caramel Box.	
2012	C³	Shin Oonuma	1	Adaptation of the light novel series written by Hazuki Minase.	
2014	Strike Witches: Operation Victory Arrow	Kazuhiro Takamura	3	Side story to Strike Witches.	
2014	Bonjour Sweet Love Patisserie	Noriaki Akitaya	24	Based on the mobile game by more games. Co-produced with Connect. (2014–15)	
2014	Alice in Borderland	Hideki Tachibana	3	Adaptation of the shōnen manga series by Haro Aso. (2014–15); Co-produced with Connect.	
2015	Strike the Blood: Kingdom of the Valkyria	Hideyo Yamamoto; Takao Sano	2	Sequel to Strike the Blood. Co-produced with Connect.	
2016	Tanaka-kun Is Always Listless	Shinya Kawatsura	2		
2016	Strike the Blood II	Hideyo Yamamoto; Takao Sano	8	Sequel to Strike the Blood: Valkyria no Ōkoku-hen. (2016–2017); Co-produced with Connect.	
2017	Armed Girl's Machiavellism	Hideki Tachibana	1	Co-produced with Connect.	
2019	Fate/kaleid liner Prisma Illya: Prisma Phantasm	Shin Oonuma	1	Side story to Fate/kaleid liner Prisma Illya.	

=== Films ===
Year	Title	Director(s)	Released	Note(s)	Ref(s)
2017	Chaos;Child: Silent Sky	Masato Jinbo	June 17	Sequel to Chaos;Child.	
2017	Fate/Kaleid Liner Prisma Illya: Vow in the Snow	Shin Oonuma	August 26	Sequel to Fate/kaleid liner Prisma Illya 3rei!!.	
2018	Non Non Biyori Vacation	Shinya Kawatsura	August 25	Sequel to Non Non Biyori Repeat.	
2021	Fate/kaleid liner Prisma Illya: Licht - The Nameless Girl	Shin Oonuma	August 27	Sequel to Fate/kaleid liner Prisma Illya: Vow in the Snow	
2023	My Next Life as a Villainess: All Routes Lead to Doom! The Movie	Keisuke Inoue	December 8	Based on an original story by Satoru Yamaguchi	

== See also ==
- Shaft—Silver Link director Shin Oonuma was a former director with Shaft, and serves in a similar capacity to longtime colleague Akiyuki Shinbo's role at Shaft with Silver Link.
