= Connect (studio) =

Japanese animation studio

CONNECT
- Native name: CONNECT
- Romanized name: Konekuto
- Type: Division
- Industry: Japanese animation
- Founded: April 2012; 14 years ago
- Headquarters: Shimorenjaku, Musashino, Tokyo, Japan
- Parent: Silver Link
- Website: connect.jp.net

Connect (Japanese: Connect, Hepburn: Konekuto; stylized as CONNECT) is a Japanese animation studio that is a division of Silver Link. The studio was initially founded as a separate company, Connect, Inc. (Japanese: 株式会社コネクト, Hepburn: Kabushiki-gaisha Konekuto) in April 2012 as a subsidiary of Silver Link, but was later wholly absorbed and dissolved into its parent company on July 17, 2020, and it subsequently became a sub-studio within the company.

== History ==
A majority of Connect's early works are co-productions with its parent company. Starting with the Monster Strike web anime, the studio was working less with its parent company, producing solo productions such as Senryu Girl, Oresuki, and The Honor Student at Magic High School.

=== Representative staff ===
==== Current ====
- Yukihiro Sugitani (4th CEO)
- Takashi Tanaka (board member)
- Kazuya Shiraishi (board member)
- Minemichi Hasegawa (board member)
- Jirou Nakagawa (executive officer, former board member)

==== Former ====
- Hayato Kaneko (board member and 1st CEO)
- Masahiro Tabeya (executive officer, board member, and 2nd CEO)
- Tomoaki Asano (3rd CEO)
- Kazunari Yasui (5th co-CEO)
- Akihiro Ueda (board member)
- Akihiro Hayashi (board member)
- Ryou Kimura (board member)

== Works ==
=== Television series ===
Year(s)	Title	Director(s)	Eps	Note(s)	Ref(s)
2013–2014	Strike the Blood	Takao Sano; Hideyo Yamamoto	24	Adaptation of the light novel series by Gakuto Mikumo. Co-produced with Silver Link.	
2015	Chaos Dragon	Hideki Tachibana; Masato Matsune	12	Based on the Red Dragon role-playing game. Co-produced with Silver Link.	
2016	Ange Vierge	Masafumi Tamura	12	Based on the trading card game by Kadokawa and Sega. Co-produced with Silver Link.	
2017	Armed Girl's Machiavellism	Hideki Tachibana	12	Adaptation of the manga series written by Yūya Kurokami. Co-produced with Silver Link.	
2018	Death March to the Parallel World Rhapsody	Shin Oonuma	12	Adaptation of the light novel series written by Hiro Ainana. Co-produced with Silver Link.	
2019	Senryu Girl	Masato Jinbo	12	Adaptation of the manga series written by Masakuni Igarashi.	
2019	Oresuki	Noriaki Akitaya	12	Adaptation of the light novel series written by Rakuda.	
2021	The Honor Student at Magic High School	Hideki Tachibana	13	Adaptation of the manga series written by Tsutomu Satō.	
2022	Slow Loop	Noriaki Akitaya	12	Adaptation of the manga series written by Maiko Uchino.	
2023	Ayakashi Triangle	Noriaki Akitaya	12	Adaptation of the manga series written by Kentaro Yabuki.	
2024	The Unwanted Undead Adventurer	Noriaki Akitaya	12	Adaptation of the light novel series written by Yū Okano.	
2024	The Many Sides of Voice Actor Radio	Hideki Tachibana	12	Adaptation of the light novel series written by Kō Nigatsu.	
2025	The Shy Hero and the Assassin Princesses	Noriaki Akitaya	12	Adaptation of the manga series written by Norishiro-chan.	
2026	I Made Friends with the Second Prettiest Girl in My Class	Hideki Tachibana	12	Adaptation of the light novel series written by Takata.	

=== OVA/ONAs ===
Year(s)	Title	Director(s)	Eps	Note(s)	Ref(s)
2014–2015	Bonjour Sweet Love Patisserie	Noriaki Akitaya	24	Based on the mobile game by more games. Co-produced with Silver Link.	
2014–2015	Alice in Borderland	Hideki Tachibana	3	Adaptation of the shōnen manga series by Haro Aso. Co-produced with Silver Link.	
2015	Strike the Blood: Valkyria no Ōkoku-hen	Hideyo Yamamoto	2	Sequel to Strike the Blood. Co-produced with Silver Link.	
2016–2017	Strike the Blood II	Hideyo Yamamoto	8	Sequel to Strike the Blood: Valkyria no Ōkoku-hen. Co-produced with Silver Link.	
2016	Monster Strike: Rain of Memories	Hideo Tachibana	1	Co-produced with Ultra Super Pictures.	
2017	Armed Girl's Machiavellism	Hideki Tachibana	1	Co-produced with Silver Link.	
2018–2019	Strike the Blood III	Hideyo Yamamoto	10	Sequel to Strike the Blood II.	
2020	Strike the Blood: Kieta Seisō-hen	Hideyo Yamamoto	1	Sequel to Strike the Blood III.	
2020–2021	Strike the Blood IV	Hideyo Yamamoto	12	Sequel to Strike The Blood: Kieta Seisō-hen.	
2020	Oresuki	Noriaki Akitaya	1	Sequel to Oresuki.	
2022	Strike the Blood Final	Hideyo Yamamoto	4	Sequel to Strike the Blood IV.	
