= Tetsuharu =

- Gender: Male

Origin
- Origin: Japanese
- Meaning: Different meanings depending on the kanji used

Tetsuharu (written: 哲治) is a masculine Japanese given name. Notable people with the name include:

- Tetsuharu Kawakami (川上 哲治; born 1920), Japanese baseball player and manager
- Tetsuharu Ōta (太田 哲治; born 1980), Japanese voice actor
- Tetsuharu Yamaguchi (山口 哲治; born 1970), Japanese footballer
