= Armed Girl's Machiavellism =

Japanese manga series

- First tankōbon volume cover, featuring Rin Onigawara (middle) and Fudou Nomura (lower-right)

武装少女マキャヴェリズム (Busō Shōjo Makyaverizumu)
- Genre: Action, comedy
- Manga
- Written by: Yūya Kurokami
- Illustrated by: Karuna Kanzaki
- Published by: Kadokawa Shoten
- Magazine: Monthly Shōnen Ace
- Original run: March 25, 2014 – June 24, 2022
- Volumes: 13
- Anime television series
- Directed by: Hideki Tachibana
- Produced by: Jōtarō Ishigami
- Written by: Kento Shimoyama
- Music by: Hiromi Mizutani (Team-MAX)
- Studio: Silver Link; Connect
- Licensed by: AUS: Madman Entertainment; NA: Sentai Filmworks; UK: MVM Films; SA/SEA: Muse Communication
- Original network: AT-X, Tokyo MX, KBS, TV Aichi, Sun TV, TVQ, BS11
- English network: SEA: Animax Asia
- Original run: April 5, 2017 – June 21, 2017
- Episodes: 12 + OVA
- icon

Armed Girl's Machiavellism (Japanese: 武装少女マキャヴェリズム, Hepburn: Busō Shōjo Makyaverizumu) is a Japanese manga written by Yuya Kurokami and illustrated by Karuna Kanzaki. The series was serialized in Kadokawa's Monthly Shōnen Ace magazine from March 2014 to June 2022. An anime television series adaptation from the manga created by Silver Link and Connect aired from April to June 2017.

== Plot ==
Fudo Nomura is a young man who was recently expelled from his old high school as a result of a massive, violent brawl with Kirukiru Amou. He wants a normal life, but the new school he transferred to is Private Aichi Symbiosis Academy, where the female students have been violently oppressing their male classmates ever since the school became co-ed. A five-member vigilante group called the "Supreme Five Swords", led by Rin Onigawara, holds Nomura at sword-point to concede to the rules or leave the school. At this point, Nomura challenges the Supreme Five Swords for his own right and prove true morality despite the brutal force.

== Characters ==
Fudou Nomura (納村 不道, Nomura Fudō)
Voiced by: Tasuku Hatanaka (Japanese); Scott Gibbs (English)
A student who has only recently transferred to Aiichi, Nomura desires freedom and dislikes being forced to do things against his will. During a huge brawl, he managed to defeat 40 people and was then expelled from his previous school and was forcefully transferred to the Private Aiichi Symbiosis Academy. He uses knife-proof gloves and his signature technique is the Spirit Bullet, a powerful palm-strike. He makes it his goal to collect the stamps from the Supreme Five Swords. He is an orphan and does not remember his parents. He was taken in by an old man, believed to be his grandfather who subjected him to abusive training. He originally practices the Jigen-ryū style of swordsmanship but eventually gives up on using the sword due to the damage inflicted in his body during sword practices. However, his training granted him a huge resistance to pain or torture.
Rin Onigawara (鬼瓦 輪, Onigawara Rin)
Voiced by: Yūki Takada (Japanese); Kira Vincent-Davis (English)
Rin is a renowned sword wielder and leader the Supreme Five Swords. She wears an oni mask due to her terrible childhood and is also known for being merciless to the point that most transfer students in her class quit school. She holds feelings for Nomura after accidentally kissing each other and started watching after him instead of correcting him. She is now covering only her right eye instead of the face after Nomura changes her view about herself and relieved her inner heart. She practices the Japanese Swordsmanship style of Kashima Shinden Jikishinkage-ryū.
Mary Kikakujou (亀鶴城 メアリ, Kikakujō Meari)
Voiced by: Sayaka Kitahara (Japanese); Maggie Flecknoe (English)
A well endowed French-Japanese student and a member of the Supreme Five Swords, Mary is well versed in western style fencing, accurately piercing central nerves with her rapier. After her fight with Nomura, she seems to have gained some feelings for him after failing to coax him into touching her breasts. She become the second person to get close on Nomura but instead quarrelling with Rin on watching over Nomura. Whenever she gets flustered or excited, she tends to revert to speaking French. She is also have a perverted mind to let Nomura touch her body whenever she does things wrong to him but quickly rejected by Nomura, making her disappointed.
Satori Tamaba (眠目 さとり, Tamaba Satori)
Voiced by: Nozomi Nishida (Japanese); Allison Sumrall (English)
One of the Supreme Five Swords (Tenka Goken) at The Private Aichi Academy. She blackmailed Nomura to defeat him but instead was defeated herself. After the brawl with Nomura, she started to have interest in him and calls him Nomura-chan instead of his full name. She is a practitioner of swordsmanship style of Keishi-ryū Kidachi Kata, which consists of 10 kata from 10 different kenjutsu schools and is officially taught to Japanese Police Officers.
Warabi Hanasaka (花酒 蕨, Hanasaka Warabi)
Voiced by: Rina Hidaka (Japanese); Juliet Simmons (English)
She is a member of the Supreme Five Swords who has a pet bear named Kyoubou and later a pet cub, Domou. After Nomura had defeated Mary and Rin, she organised 'Waralimpics', an event to correct students, in her master plan to correct Mary, Rin and ultimately Nomura, but failed. She then organised her followers to execute the emergency plan and invites Nomura to meet her on the rooftop. She, Kyoubou and her closest followers were defeated by Nomura, Rin and Mary. She later helped Nomura as his new friend to get him into the girl's dormitory in order to find Satori after Nomura found himself at a disadvantage from Satori's blackmailing plans. She is a practitioner of the Japanese Swordsmanship style of Taisha-ryū.
Tsukuyo Inaba (因幡 月夜, Inaba Tsukuyo)
Voiced by: Natsumi Hioka (Japanese); Luci Christian (English)
A middle school girl prodigy who skipped a grade. She is blind and is the strongest of the Five. She is an expert at iaido. She and Nomura studied a similar style of swordsmanship, while Nomura practices the Jigen-ryu, Tsukuyo practices its descendant style, Yakumaru Jigen-ryū. Even though using the same sword style, Tsukuyo still managed to overpower him with her fully mastered sword skills. Days after Kirukiru Amou getting expelled, Inaba had made Nomura to become her disciple to further increase his Spirit Bullet's power.
Kirukiru Amou (天羽 斬々, Kirukiru Amō)
Voiced by: Eriko Matsui (Japanese); Carli Mosier (English)
A transfer student who has been sent to Private Aiichi Symbiosis Academy for being the boss of a gang that was involved in a huge brawl. She later became known as "Empress" after single-handedly defeating two of the Supreme Five Swords, Rin and Mary. Before being transferred, she fought against Nomura which he suffer bad injuries and get hospitalized. Amou falls in love with Nomura after being defeated by him in a one-on-one battle, when he declined to be her subordinate. She gets very jealous when she saw Nomura get too close with the Supreme Five Sword members. After the row with the Supreme Five Sword and Nomura, she befriended Nomura and was expelled from Aichi Academy and gets forcefully transferred to Private Hokkai Symbiosis Academy. She is a practitioner of Karate, specifically the Uechi-ryu Karate.
Nono Mozunono (百舌鳥野 のの, Mozunono Nono)
Voiced by: Miku Itō (Japanese); Shanae'a Moore (English)
Rin's freshman and second in-command.
Chouka U Baragasaki (蝶華・U・薔薇咲, Barazaki U Chōka)
Voiced by: Akane Kohinata (Japanese); Margaret McDonald (English)
Mary's freshman and second in-command. She is actually Japanese and wears a wig and contact lenses to change her appearance to resemble that of a westerner.
Sassa Kurasaki (倉崎 佐々, Kurosaki Sasa)
Voiced by: Miharu Hanai (Japanese); Catherine Thomas (English)
One of Nomura and Rin's classmates.
Ui Migii (右井 右井, Migii Ui)
Voiced by: Shiori Mutō (Japanese); Elissa Cuellar (English)
One of Nomura and Rin's classmates.
Tsunemi Touko (ツネミトコ, Tōko Tsunemi)
Voiced by: Miharu Sawada (Japanese); Chelsea McCurdy (English)
One of Warabi's musketeers, she uses a range of iron as a weapon.
Kinue Tanukihara (タヌキハラ キヌエ, Tanukihara Kinue)
Voiced by: Yūki Yamada (Japanese); Katelyn Barr (English)
She is one of Warabi's Musketeers, she uses two truncheons as weapons. She also has a pencil to write on her notepad.
Nico Saruwatari (猿渡 ニコ, Saruwatari Nico)
Voiced by: Natsumi Yamada (Japanese); Alexandra Bedford (English)
A student a Aichi Private Academy who resembles an adolescent boy. She often shown wearing sunglasses and an exercise jersey.
Kyoubou (キョーボー, Kyōbō)
Voiced by: Saki Fujita (Japanese); Joanne Bonasso (English)
Hanasaka's pet bear. It seemed to have affection for Nomura after being defeated by Nomura twice. It bore a cub, Doumo.
Misogi Tamaba (眠目 ミソギ, Tamaba Misogi)
Voiced by: Nozomi Nishida (Japanese); Allison Sumrall (English)
She is the elder twin sister of Satori. Her real name is Satori, when children, "Misogi" decided to be Satori, and "Satori" eventually became "Misogi". Misogi stole Satori's identity making everyone in their family believe that she was Satori and vice versa, stealing the real Satori's birthright as the successor of their family's sword school. Now "Misogi" follows "Satori's" shadow, unconditionally loving her monstrous sister.
Kusuo Masukodera (増子寺 楠男, Masukodera Kusuo)
Voiced by: Tetsuharu Ōta (Japanese); Andrew Love (English)
One of the male students in Aichi Academy. Like the rest of the male student (except for Nomura), he wears makeup as a means to co-exist with the female students in the academy. He is also Nomura's roommate and his first friend.
Koharu Narukami (鳴神 虎春, Narukami Koharu)
Voiced by: Eri Kitamura (Japanese); Brittney Karbowski (English)
The governor of Aiichi and Tsukuyo's older half-sister. She was the one who assigned Tsukuyo to watch over Nomura.
Yukino Fujibayashi (藤林 祥乃, Fujibayashi Yukino)
Voiced by: Mamiko Noto (Japanese); Joanne Bonasso (English)
Headmistress of the school and the butler and bodyguard of Koharu Narukami.
Eva Maria Rose (エヴァマリアローズ, Eva Maria Rose)
Voiced by: Saki Fujita (Japanese); Casey Magin (English)
She is the mother of the female dormitory, she takes care of Tsukuyo on Koharu's warrant.
Doumou (ドモモ, Dōmō)
Voiced by: Saki Fujita (Japanese); Natalie Jones (English)
It is the youngest son of Kyoubou, he appears to be great at hiding.
Dousetsu Kirisaki (桐崎道津, Kirisaki Dōsetsu)
Voiced by: Chiharu Shigematsu
He's a friend of Fudou from his previous school. Fudou held out his hand to him, Dousetsu amiably invited him to stroll through the school. Kirukiru out of jealousy, pounded his face, incapacitating him from standing up. It is later revealed that Fudou's motive for wanting to be free to leave Aichi Private was to see if Dousetsu was well.
Omugi (大隈, Omugi)
Voiced by: Chiharu Shigematsu (Japanese); Joe Daniels (English)
He is one of Kusuo's colleagues, he is always seen next to Hiko. He, Hiko and Kusuo, are the narrators in the final credits of the episodes.
Hiko (ヒコ, Hiko)
Voiced by: Tomoya Kousaka (Japanese); Gareth West (English)
He is the friend of Omugi, like all other male students, he coexists with the rules of the school. Hiko and Kusuo, are the narrators of the final extras of the episodes.

== Media ==
=== Manga ===
Artist Karuna Kanzaki and writer Yuya Kurokami launched the series in the May 2014 issue of Kadokawa Shoten's shōnen manga magazine Monthly Shōnen Ace on March 25, 2014. The series ended in the August 2022 issue published on June 24, 2022. The first three chapters were later made available on the ComicWalker website. The series has been compiled into thirteen tankōbon volumes to date.

No.	Japanese release date	Japanese ISBN
1	October 25, 2014	978-4-04-102229-0
2	February 26, 2015	978-4-04-102877-3
3	July 25, 2015	978-4-04-103449-1
4	February 26, 2016	978-4-04-104088-1
5	July 26, 2016	978-4-04-104537-4
6	March 25, 2017	978-4-04-104538-1
7	November 25, 2017 (w/BD edition); November 25, 2017 (regular ed.)	978-4-04-105638-7 (w/BD ed.); ISBN 978-4-04-106307-1 (regular ed.)
8	July 26, 2018	978-4-04-106929-5
9	June 25, 2019	978-4-04-106930-1
10	February 25, 2020	978-4-04-109039-8
11	November 25, 2020	978-4-04-109040-4
12	September 25, 2021	978-4-04-111713-2
13	August 26, 2022	978-4-04-111714-9

=== Anime ===
In May 2016, series illustrator Karuna Kanzaki tweeted that there would be an "important announcement" concerning the series in the August issue of Monthly Shōnen Ace on June 26, 2016. On June 19, 2016, Kadokawa announced that the series would receive an anime adaptation, which will be animated by Silver Link and Connect. The anime was directed by Hideki Tachibana and written by Kento Shimoyama. The character designs are handled by Shoko Takimoto and the music is composed by Hiromi Mizutani from Team-MAX. It aired from April to June 2017. An original video animation was released with the manga's 7th volume on November 25, 2017. Sentai Filmworks has licensed the series in North America. MVM Films released the series in the United Kingdom. Muse Communication licensed the series in Asia-Pacific.

No.	Title	Original release date
1	"The Magnificent Blade, Rin Onigawara" "Subarashiki Yaiba, Onigawara Rin" (Japanese: 素晴らしき刃「鬼瓦輪」)	April 5, 2017
In Aichi Coexistence academy, the boys are forced to coexist with the girls by throwing away their masculinity. Fudo Nomura transferred there without knowing anything, and was then surrounded in class by a group of armed girls. There, Rin Onigawara, one of the Supreme Five Swords that reigned over the school, proclaimed that she will "correct" Nomura.
2	"The Chastity Dorm Riot" "Teishuku Ryō, Sōran" (Japanese: 「貞淑寮」騒乱)	April 12, 2017
While Nomura won in his fight against Rin, he accidentally stole a kiss from her, which earned the ire of the girl students. Members of the junior high and close friends from members of the Five Swords, Nono Mizunono and Choka U. Baragasaki chases after Nomura for revenge, but Nomura barely cared. Instead, he went to the girls' dormitory in order to get the exit permit from the currently ill Rin.
3	"The Fair Sword, Mary Kikakujo" "Uruwashiki Yaiba, Kikakujō Meari" (Japanese: 麗しき刃「亀鶴城メアリ」)	April 19, 2017
After causing a mess in the girls' dorm, Nomura is put under supervision of Rin. However, he became the target of another Supreme Five Swords, Mary Kikakujo. While Rin held Mary back and Nomura was chased by Choka, Nomura met with the Empress, Kirukiru Amou, who Nomura seems to know from before he transferred here.
4	"The Warabinpics are Starting!" "Warabinpikku, Kaimaku Sengen!" (Japanese: 「ワラビンピック」開幕宣言！)	April 26, 2017
Nomura is now supervised not only by Rin, but also by Mary. However, any outsider would say that they're not supervising him, but instead flirting with him. This angers the eldest member of the Supreme Five Swords, Warabi Hanasaka. And thus, Nomura, Rin, and Mary are forced to participate on Bloodsport Day, the 13th Warabimpics.
5	"The Love-Crazed Blade, Warabi Hanasaka" "Ai Kuruoshiki Yaiba, Hanazake Warabi" (Japanese: 愛狂しき刃「花酒蕨」)	May 3, 2017
Thanks to Nomura's efforts, the Warabimpics have ended well, but Warabi is not someone to give up so easily. She sets up a trap, inviting Nomura to come to the school to get his permission stamp from as a reward for his victory. But on his way, he faces WRB34 (Warabi thirty-four). With the help of Rin, Mary, Nono and Choka, Nomura manages to advance. That is until he meets one of the Supreme Five Swords, Satori Tamaba!
6	"Notes on a Scandal" "Aru Sukyandāru no Oboegaki" (Japanese: ある「スキャンダル」の覚え書き)	May 10, 2017
Nomura seems to have entered his popularity phase. Because of his great success at the Warabimbics, the girls of the school follow him with hungry eyes. Even though he spends his days as usual, even the slightest action from him is followed by a wave of cheers. Nomura himself does not really think much of it, but Rin and Mary do not think it's funny. But the happy times can not continue forever. One morning, while his bags get checked by Rin and Mary like always, 'something' falls out of his pocket.
7	"The Dubious Sword, Satori Tamaba" "Ayashiki Yaiba, Tamaba Satori" (Japanese: 妖しき刃「眼目さとり」)	May 17, 2017
Thanks to Satori's tricks, Nomura's reputation is on the ground. It was Warabi, who has had an eye on him since the Warabimpics, who trapped him inside the punishment room when Rin and Mary were out of sight. Only through acquiring Satori's pictures can Nomura prove his innocence. Thinking like that, Nomura starts to attack Warabi as well as Satori in a public bath for ladies. Nomura is pretty disturbed by the fact that Satori is not wearing any clothes. She still attacks him without any regard for his feelings. That's just the kind of monster she is.
8	"His and Crossdressing Her Circumstances" "Kareshi Kanojo Onē no, Jijō" (Japanese: 彼氏彼女オネエの「事情」)	May 24, 2017
When Nomura opened his eyes, he was in the infirmary. After the battle with Satori, Warabi passed out and was brought in as well. Rin and Mary know nothing about Warabi and are concerned about Nomura and want to visit him, running into each other on the way. And while both of them forget what they were originally about to do, they start a strange fight. Meanwhile, Warabi faces a different problem in the infirmary.
9	"The Day Love Died" "Ai, ga Kowareta Hi" (Japanese: 「愛」が壊れた日)	May 31, 2017
This morning was Nomura's worst so far. He woke up from a nightmare filled with his past, clouded memories colored in the red of blood. However, his attention was soon grabbed by the uproar happening in the dormitory, caused by those who would not understand in what kind of state he is in. Apparently, a monster is in their bathroom. Meanwhile, in the girls dorm, they have to deal with other problems, because things keep disappearing, which should not. And then the Empress, Kirukiru Amou, disappears as well.
10	"The Terrifying Blade, Tsukuyo Inaba" "Osoroshiki Yaiba, Inaba Tsukiyo" (Japanese: 恐ろき刃「因幡月夜」)	June 7, 2017
Tsukuyo Inaba is one of the Heavenly Five swords with extraordinary skills. She fights using Yakumaru Jiken-ryuu. Facing her god-like speed, even Nomura cannot help but be surprised, as he realizes that her skill is far above his own. But their talks are interrupted when they hear sounds of a fight coming from the rooftop of the school. Nomura and Tsukuyo head there to see what is going on. But when they arrive, the Empress has already disappeared.
11	"The Magic Bullet I'll Always Remember" "Mune ni Nokoru Ano Hi no, Dangan" (Japanese: 胸に残るあの日の「弾丸」)	June 14, 2017
Nomura's screams trembling with anger. Amou's roar responds. The voices of them roar throughout the school. The intuition of Nomura was correct. The Empress was Amou who once believed that he was a friend and was betrayed, fought, and deeply hated. Amou also remembers the old memories. With the bitter memories that were awakened, the rematch is now being cut off. Nomura will use "magic bullet" through the automatic counterattack and the defense of the iron wall to reach Amou.
12	"The Girls' Machiavellism" "Shōjo-tachi no Makyaverizumu" (Japanese: 少女達の「マキャヴェリズム」)	June 21, 2017
Since the transfer, the days at the lively and fun school that Nomura spent with the circles. It was a day when the suffering of hell was plagued by the sword, as if the body was burned by flames. During the battle, various thoughts come to each other's hearts. However, no matter how much the fists are mixed, the wishes of them never overlap. The more they understand each other, the farther they are from our hearts. And when it's finally settled, in the heavy rain, Nomura and Amou finally arrived.
OVA	"Throbbing! Five Swords' Inn Excursion" "Doki! "Goken-darake" no Ian Ryokou" (Japanese: ドキッ！「五剣だらけ」の慰安旅行)	November 25, 2017
One day, a while after the battle with Nomura was settled, members of the Five Swords of the world were called by the school director. The Five Swords that were supposed to lead the school strictly were destroyed by only one opponent, the school director took that fact very seriously. The school director, who saw the cause as a lack of teamwork of five people, proposes a comfort trip to the Five Swords to deepen their friendship. There was no problem, but the condition that "only one ordinary student can accompany you" makes a wave among the Five Swords.

== Reception ==
The fourth volume of the series appeared on the Oricon manga charts at 49th place, selling 16,180 copies.
