= I Made Friends with the Second Prettiest Girl in My Class =

Japanese light novel series

- First light novel volume cover, featuring Umi Asanagi (left) and Yuu Amami (right)

クラスで2番目に可愛い女の子と友だちになった (Kurasu de Ni-ban Me ni Kawaii Onna no Ko to Tomodachi ni Natta)
- Genre: Romantic comedy
- Novel series
- Written by: Takata
- Published by: Kakuyomu
- Original run: November 30, 2020 – September 2, 2024 (On hiatus)
- Light novel
- Written by: Takata
- Illustrated by: Tom Osabe (volume 1); Azuri Hyūga (from volume 2)
- Published by: Kadokawa Shoten
- Imprint: Kadokawa Sneaker Bunko
- Original run: December 24, 2021 – July 1, 2026
- Volumes: 10 + 1 side story
- Manga
- Written by: Takata
- Illustrated by: Rin Ono
- Published by: Media Factory
- English publisher: NA: Yen Press
- Magazine: Comic Alive+
- Original run: July 27, 2022 – present
- Volumes: 8
- Anime television series
- Directed by: Hideki Tachibana
- Written by: Keiichirō Ōchi
- Music by: Ruka Kawada; Yayoi Sekimukai; Shūhei Mutsuki
- Studio: Connect
- Licensed by: Crunchyroll
- Original network: Tokyo MX, Kansai TV, BS Asahi, AT-X
- Original run: April 7, 2026 – June 23, 2026
- Episodes: 12
- icon

I Made Friends with the Second Prettiest Girl in My Class (Japanese: クラスで2番目に可愛い女の子と友だちになった, Hepburn: Kurasu de Ni-ban Me ni Kawaii Onna no Ko to Tomodachi ni Natta; lit. 'I Became Friends With the Second Cutest Girl in Class'), shortened as Kuranika (クラにか) is a Japanese romantic comedy light novel series written by Takata and illustrated by Tom Osabe (first volume) and Azuri Hyūga (from second volume). It began serialization online in November 2020 on Kadokawa's user-generated novel publishing website Kakuyomu. It was later published by Kadokawa Shoten with ten volumes and a side story volume from December 2021 to July 2026 under their Kadokawa Sneaker Bunko imprint. A manga adaptation with art by Rin Ono has been serialized online via Media Factory's Comic Alive+ website since July 2022 and has been collected in eight tankōbon volumes. An anime television series adaptation produced by Connect aired from April to June 2026.

== Plot ==
Maki Maehara, a shy, lonely, high school student, unexpectedly becomes friends with Umi Asanagi after Umi learns about Maki's interests in scary movies. Umi, a popular student, is considered the second prettiest girl in their class behind Yuu Amami, who is Umi's best friend. Despite having seemingly different backgrounds, Maki and Umi share many of the same interests, which strengthens their bond together and leads to them hanging out after school often at Maki's house. As Maki and Umi become closer, Umi's best friend, Yuu, learns about their bond and joins Umi in befriending and hanging out with Maki.

== Characters ==
Maki Maehara (前原 真樹, Maehara Maki)
Voiced by: Haruki Ishiya (PV, anime)
A high school student who has a loner personality. He is interested in anime, video games, B-movies, and other hobbies. After Umi reaches out, they start hanging out because they share similar hobbies. He has trauma over his parents' divorce, subconsciously thinking all relationships will eventually fail. Initially, he rejects Umi's sudden confession, feeling he's not fit to be her boyfriend and that he doesn't want a relationship with anyone. But as they spend more time together, he realizes he actually has a crush on her and gets flustered when she does cute things or shows him appreciation. Eventually, he confesses to her and becomes her boyfriend. By the end of the series, he and Umi are 30 years old; he works at city hall, is married to Umi, and has a young son and daughter with her.
Umi Asanagi (朝凪 海, Asanagi Umi)
Voiced by: Manaka Iwami (PV, anime)
Maki's classmate, who is often referred to as the "second prettiest" girl in class. She has short black hair and is considered very attractive. She is best friends with Yuu, the prettiest girl in class, though she harbors an inferiority complex toward her, which she hides behind a composed front. However, this slowly wears her down and makes her more guarded around Yuu. After learning they share similar tastes, she reaches out to Maki, and they begin hanging out often. She often goes to his apartment, which leads their mothers to realize how close they are. She falls in love with Maki and often gets jealous when he interacts with other girls, including her friends, or flustered when he shows her appreciation. She also becomes extremely angry and defensive when people insult Maki. Though he initially rejects her confession, she eventually becomes his girlfriend when he finally returns her feelings. At the end of the series, she and Maki are 30 years old; she works as a private school teacher, is married to Maki, and has a young son and daughter with him.
Yuu Amami (天海 夕, Amami Yū)
Voiced by: Sayumi Suzushiro (PV, anime)
Maki and Umi's classmate, who is considered the prettiest girl in their class. She has long blonde hair and is of foreign descent. She is childhood friends with Umi and her best friend. She takes an interest in Maki and begins hanging out with him after noticing his honesty, kindness, and respect for others. Despite her good intentions, she struggles to read the room, which can create awkward situations. She also seems to have growing feelings for Maki, albeit much more slowly than Umi. However, she decides not to pursue those feelings for Umi's sake and remains good friends with Maki.
Nina Nitta (新田新奈, Nitta Nīna)
Voiced by: Ikumi Hasegawa (anime)
A red-haired girl in Yuu and Umi's friend group, who rarely hangs out with Maki. She often forgets Maki's name and instead calls him "class representative" (委員長, Iin-chō). She also often falls for older males who cheat on her.
Masaki Maehara (前原真咲, Maehara Masaki)
Voiced by: Yūko Kaida
Maki's mother, who works as an editor at a publishing company. She has been working hard at raising Maki alone since divorcing his father, to the point that it was affecting her health. Similar to Sora, she is quite fond of Umi. She is a smoker.
Sora Asanagi (朝凪空, Asanagi Sora)
Voiced by: Shizuka Itō
Umi's mother. She resembles an older version of Umi. She enjoys teasing Umi about her relationship with Maki and is quite fond of Maki herself.
Miki Yagisawa (八木沢美紀, Yagisawa Miki)
Voiced by: Minami Tsuda
The first-year homeroom teacher of Maki, Umi, Yuu, Nina, and Nozomu. In their second year, she continues as the homeroom teacher for Maki and Yuu's class.
Nozomu Seki (関 望, Seki Nozomu)
Voiced by: Rikuya Yasuda
A boy in Maki's class who has a crush on Yuu and, as a result, is initially at odds with Maki because of Yuu's perceived closeness to him. After a failed attempt to confess to Yuu, Nozomu seeks Maki's companionship to get along with Yuu. As a baseball player aspiring to turn professional, Nozomu also helps Maki improve his physical fitness to support his relationship with Umi.
Itsuki Maehara (前原 樹, Maehara Itsuki)
Voiced by: Shinji Kawada
Maki's estranged father due to a divorce. He encounters Maki for the first time in months at the start of December.
Kyoka Minato (湊 京香, Minato Kyoka)
Voiced by: Yurina Amami
Itsuki's secretary, who owes her position to Itsuki's trust in her. Her feelings for Itsuki deepen when she discovers Itsuki's divorce papers, but she willingly abandons them after seeing how the divorce affected Maki.

== Production ==
Takata became a member of Kadokawa Corporation's user-generated novel publishing website Kakuyomu in February 2016. He chose Kakuyomu over Shōsetsuka ni Narō to start writing web novels because there were few people on Kakuyomu, which officially began its service in February 2016. He wrote several novels, and one of his works, Toshiue Elite Onna Kishi ga Boku no Mae de dake Kawaii (年上エリート女騎士が僕の前でだけ可愛い), which won the grand prize in the 4th Kakuyomu Web Novel Contest for the romantic comedy category, was acquired by Kadokawa Shoten who began to publish it as a light novel with under their Kadokawa Sneaker Bunko imprint between 2019 and 2020 with only two volumes published. I Made Friends with the Second Prettiest Girl in My Class won the special prize in the 6th Kakuyomu Web Novel Contest for the romantic comedy category, but this time the story takes place in modern Japan, instead of a fantasy world.

== Media ==
=== Light novels ===
Written by Takata, I Made Friends with the Second Prettiest Girl in My Class began serialization on Kadokawa Corporation's user-generated novel publishing website Kakuyomu on November 30, 2020. It later began being published under Kadokawa Shoten's Kadokawa Sneaker Bunko light novel imprint, with the first volume being released on December 24, 2021. Tom Osabe illustrated the first volume of the light novel, but was replaced by Azuri Hyūga starting with the second volume as Osabe could not continue due to "various circumstances". Ten volumes and a side story volume were released. The series ended with the release of its tenth volume on July 1, 2026, with Takata leaving open the possibility of doing a spin-off.

==== Volumes ====
No.	Release date	ISBN
1	December 24, 2021	978-4-04-112034-7
2	July 29, 2022	978-4-04-112035-4
3	December 28, 2022	978-4-04-113287-6
4	June 1, 2023	978-4-04-113731-4
5	November 1, 2023	978-4-04-113732-1
6	May 1, 2024	978-4-04-114918-8
7	October 1, 2024	978-4-04-115434-2
7.5	May 1, 2025	978-4-04-116154-8
8	October 1, 2025	978-4-04-116641-3
9	April 1, 2026	978-4-04-117277-3
10	July 1, 2026	978-4-04-117513-2
10.5	December 25, 2026	978-4-04-117793-8

=== Manga ===
A manga adaptation illustrated by Rin Ono began serialization on Media Factory's Comic Alive+ website on July 27, 2022. Eight tankōbon volumes have been released as of June 2026. The manga adaptation is licensed in North America by Yen Press.

==== Volumes ====
No.	Original release date	Original ISBN	English release date	English ISBN
1	March 1, 2023	978-4-04-112034-7	July 1, 2025	979-8-8554-1126-3
1. Fellow Enthusiasts; 2. Secret Friends; 3. Good Intentions & Goodwill; 4. A Gentle World; 5. Everyone's Pal; 6. Monday After School; Bonus Short Story: Hanging Out With (Girl) Friends is Hard
2	May 26, 2023	978-4-04-811220-8	November 25, 2025	979-8-8554-1128-7
7. A Good Person; 8. Give & Take; 9. Winning Is Losing; 10. Liar; 11. Coming Over; Bonus Short Story: Making Sweet Treats Together
3	October 27, 2023	978-4-04-811245-1	June 23, 2026	979-8-8554-1130-0
12. The Shape of Kindness; 13. Beyond the Door; 14. Beaten to the Punch; 15. True Feelings; 16. Request; 17. An Ordinary Friday; Bonus Short Story: The Night Before the Cultural Festival
4	May 28, 2024	978-4-04-811289-5	April 27, 2027	979-8-8554-2522-2
5	November 28, 2024	978-4-04-811378-6	—	—
6	June 27, 2025	978-4-04-811512-4	—	—
7	December 26, 2025	978-4-04-811708-1	—	—
8	June 26, 2026	978-4-04-811974-0	—	—
9	December 28, 2026	978-4-04-972329-8	—	—

=== Anime ===
An anime adaptation was announced during Kadokawa's "Sneaker Bunko 35th Anniversary Festa!" livestream on September 24, 2023. It was later confirmed to be a television series produced by Connect and directed by Hideki Tachibana, with Takumi Shibata serving as assistant director, Keiichirō Ōchi handling the series composition, Shoko Takimoto designing the characters, and Ruka Kawada, Yayoi Sekimukai, and Shūhei Mutsuki composing the music. It aired from April 7 to June 23, 2026, on Tokyo MX and other networks. RegretGirl performed the opening theme song "Submarine Youth" (サブマリンユース), and Koresawa performed the ending theme song "Zutto Ichiban ni Shitene" (ずっと1番にしてね). Crunchyroll is streaming the series.

==== Episodes ====
No.	Title	Directed by	Written by	Storyboarded by	Original release date
1	"The Girl Named Asanagi Umi"; Transliteration: "Asanagi Umi to Iu Onnanoko" (Japanese: 朝凪海という女の子)	Hideki Tachibana	Keiichirō Ōchi	Hideki Tachibana	April 7, 2026
Maki Maehara, a shy boy who likes video games and B-movies, is a social outcast and does not expect his time at high school to be any different. At the start of the fall trimester of school, Maki visits his local video store and encounters Umi Asanagi, his classmate who reveals a similar hobby of hers that she never told the class during the class introductions from a few months ago. Wanting to get to know him better, Umi is invited to Maki's apartment on Friday nights to enjoy video games, B-movies and takeout pizza. When it appears that Maki could not invite Umi on one Friday, Umi suggests that they hang out outside after school. Before their hangout, Umi excuses herself from the classroom during a school lunch break to address a boy from another class who wanted to go out with her. Maki, intending to have lunch by himself, finds himself roped into snooping at this boy's request, by Yuu Amami and Nina Nitta, Umi's two classmates and friends.
2	"Asanagi Umi and Amami Yuu"; Transliteration: "Asanagi Umi to Amami Yū" (Japanese: 朝凪海と天海夕)	Takumi Shibata	Keiichirō Ōchi	Takumi Shibata	April 14, 2026
Umi turns down the advance of the boy from a different class, unaware that she was being spied on by Maki, Yuu and Nina. Before they return to the classroom, Yuu lets Maki know her phone number. Maki later meets Umi at the town center for their first outside hangout, in which they visit a hobby shop, share a meal together and play at the local arcade. After Umi excuses herself to go to the restroom, Yuu and Nina both spot Maki. Unaware of Umi's visit, they attempt to get him to play with them at the arcade instead, but Maki refuses. On the train home, Umi reveals to Maki that she developed her current interests as a stress relief from the leadership roles that were expected of her from her friend group at middle school. During the following Monday before classes start, Yuu apologizes to Maki for the encounter at the arcade, but inadvertently reveals that she gave her phone number to Maki. Umi gets both of them to meet at Maki's apartment later that day for an explanation. After one more apology, Yuu asks to be Maki's friend as well.
3	"The Second Prettiest Girl in Class"; Transliteration: "Kurasu de Ni-ban Me ni......" (Japanese: クラスで二番目に……)	Geisei Morita	Keiichirō Ōchi	Hideki Tachibana	April 21, 2026
On Yuu's request, Maki leads her and Umi to an outside bench within the school grounds where he usually went to eat lunch by himself. Both Yuu and Umi are impressed by Maki's homemade lunch. When Maki reveals that he knows how to make a banana souffle, both Yuu and Umi ask him to show them. They visit Maki's apartment again for said demonstration, then kill time playing video games. Maki then refuses Yuu's request to hang out with her during the coming Friday, stating that he already has plans with "someone else". During their next hangout, Umi asks to see Maki's manga collection. They read one title together and fall asleep, eventually being caught in the act by Maki's late-returning mother Masaki. Masaki asks to inform Umi's family; they consent to Umi spending the night at Maki's apartment in exchange for Maki visiting Umi at their family home the next day. Maki visits to greet Umi's mother, who asks Umi for how she met Maki. The following Monday, when their homeroom teacher holds a lottery to determine who will represent their class at the upcoming school festival, Maki is randomly selected as the first representative, earning derisive comments from his classmates, who still see him as an off-putting loner. This bothers Yuu, who stands up to address the class.
4	"The Two and Their School Festival"; Transliteration: "Futari no Bunkasai" (Japanese: ふたりの文化祭)	Ryūta Yamamoto	Keiichirō Ōchi	Kunihisa Sugishima	April 28, 2026
Yuu's attempt to confront her class over their treatment of Maki is ended quickly by Umi, who reveals that she won the winning lot to become class representative alongside Maki for their school festival project, though later admits to Maki alone that she forged the winning lot, and the teacher was fine with that. The class proceed with Maki's idea to build a mosaic using discarded drink cans. Yuu helps with this by drafting the illustration that the mosaic would be based on. Friday night arrives with Maki still busy attempting to convert the drawing into a mosaic. He ends up calling Umi over to his apartment for help. They progress on the project and then play video games together until Yuu catches them hanging out. Yuu is disappointed that Umi would keep a secret from her; Umi refuses to explain, and leaves quietly. They put the argument aside to help the class complete the mosaic in time for the school festival. On the day of the school festival, when Yuu brings her old school friends to see the mosaic, Umi refuses to call them her friends, and begins to explain her past.
5	"From Now On, and Then On"; Transliteration: "Kore kara mo, Kore kara wa" (Japanese: これからも、これからは)	Takumi Shibata	Keiichirō Ōchi	Takumi Shibata	May 5, 2026
Umi explains her inferiority complex to Yuu as the reason why she could not let Yuu know that she was already Maki's friend before Yuu befriended Maki. She runs away from Yuu again, and Maki catches up to her, successfully persuading her to apologize in order to regain Yuu's trust. Umi is even willing to stop hanging out with Maki, but Yuu refuses to entertain the idea. She forces Umi and Maki to hold hands while walking together during the school festival, then observes the two of them hanging out at Maki's apartment. Noticing how deep Umi and Maki have already bonded over their interests, Yuu accepts spending less time with Umi, but in return, expects to be showered with more compliments from Umi, and makes her leave. Umi and Maki watch a movie for the rest of their night together. After Maki walks Umi back to her home, Umi confesses that she has fallen in love with Maki, and kisses him on the cheek.
6	"December with Friends"; Transliteration: ""Tomodachi" to no Jūnigatsu" (Japanese: 『友達』との十二月)	Geisei Morita	Keiichirō Ōchi	Hideki Tachibana	May 12, 2026
Maki still has lingering nightmares over the divorce of his parents, assuring himself that they are the reason he is yet unable to answer Umi's confession. Meanwhile, the rest of Maki's school starts to recognize that Umi is taken, causing Yuu to be faced with confessions from boys outside of her class. Maki is approached by a classmate, Nozomu Seki, for advice on how to confess to Yuu, but Maki refuses, having known that Nozomu spread rumors about him regarding Yuu. After being ultimately turned down by Yuu herself, Nozomu decides to earn the companionship of Maki in order to indirectly get closer to Yuu. After this, Maki hears about a party on Christmas Eve that his school would be hosting at a different venue and inviting students from other schools to. Umi and Maki later agree to a movie date together on the coming Saturday, but before that, Umi and Maki would go shopping for the outfit Maki would be wearing on said date. Yuu tags along to buy the outfit she would be wearing at the Christmas party, but draws the jealousy of Umi when Maki helps Yuu get up after a stumble. After Maki excuses himself to go to the restroom, he encounters his father leaving said restroom.
7	"First Date with a Friend"; Transliteration: "Tomodachi to no Hatsu Dēto" (Japanese: 友達との初デート)	Yūsuke Tomita	Keiichirō Ōchi	Hideki Tachibana	May 19, 2026
Maki's reunion with his father, Itsuki, also sees Maki introduced to Itsuki's secretary at his company, Kyouka Minato. Noticing the way Minato interacts with his father makes Maki fear the worst about his father's divorce. He puts this aside to enjoy his date with Umi the following day, in which they watch a movie, eat multiple portions of food for lunch and go to the karaoke bar together. At the end of the date, Maki is still not ready to confess to Umi. However, he does spot his father with Minato again. Umi shields Maki from the view of Itsuki and Minato as they walk past. Maki returns home after the date and learns from his mother, Masaki, that his father arranged his next visitation of Maki for the coming Friday after Maki's final exams for the trimester. Maki decides to ask Masaki whether she still loves Itsuki. Masaki responds by showing Maki a photo album of him growing up.
8	"Family Sights"; Transliteration: "Kazoku no Fūkei" (Japanese: 家族の風景)	Toshiaki Kanbara	Keiichirō Ōchi	Yūichi Nihei	May 26, 2026
As agreed upon before their date, Maki and Umi invite Yuu and Nozomu to a study session at Maki's apartment for the upcoming final exams. During the study session, Maki and Umi covertly hold hands under the kotatsu. After Yuu and Nozomu leave, Umi stays behind for a while to express her worries over hearing from Yuu that she prefers "a boyfriend like Maki". A few days later, Maki attends his father's visitation at a fancy restaurant. His father's hesitation over his questions appear to confirm to Maki that his father no longer deserves his respect. At the same time, Maki helps out his classmate Nina, who was stood up by her boyfriend during a date arranged at the same restaurant - after ordering for her boyfriend, she was informed that her boyfriend started dining with another girl somewhere else, and was forced to foot the bill for his order. Maki leaves the restaurant with Nina, not saying goodbye to his father, then buys a meat bun and some coffee for Nina. Nina is clued in on Maki's situation with his father, and expresses her empathy. Upon returning home, Maki learns that his mother has been forced to take time off work. The following day, Umi invites Maki to her home on the coming Friday for a meal with her family, including her father who has returned home for the first time in a while.
9	"Family Sights: Part Two"; Transliteration: "Kazoku no Fūkei Sono Ni" (Japanese: 家族の風景 その2)	Hiroto Miyagi & Yūri Hagiwara	Keiichirō Ōchi	Kunihisa Sugishima	June 2, 2026
Nozomu helps Maki secure an invitation to the Christmas Eve party by consulting his older sister, Tomoo, who is the school's Student Council president. Tomoo gives Maki one of the previously-cancelled invitations, and in exchange, she expects Maki to help out at the venue before the party. Afterwards, Maki attends the Asanagi family gathering, which includes both of Umi's parents, Sora and Daichi, as well as her older brother Riku. During a light-hearted family exchange over the dinner table, Maki - reflecting again on the breakdown of his own family - starts crying, and asks to leave the house. He runs away, unable to contain his emotions. Umi catches him and takes him back to her house, letting him stay the night after hearing out all of his worries. The following morning, after an earnest conversation with Daichi, Maki strengthens his resolve to tell his parents how he feels.
10	"One Last Tantrum"; Transliteration: "Saigo no Wagamama" (Japanese: 最後のわがまま)	Takumi Shibata	Keiichirō Ōchi	Takumi Shibata	June 9, 2026
On Christmas Eve, the student council of the school organizing that day's party, gathers their helpers for one last meeting. During said meeting, Maki asks Tomoo for a 15-minute break just after the party begins. After Umi goes with Yuu to put on their dresses for the occasion, Maki goes to meet Minato and ask her to be at the Christmas tree outside the venue of the party. Minato accepts, unaware that Maki had asked his parents to meet at the same location at the same time. In return, she asks Maki to stay with his father Itsuki, and is willing to abandon her feelings for Itsuki to ensure that happens. After the party officially begins, Maki goes outside where his parents meet for the first time since their divorce, and Maki makes his feelings clear on the divorce. He stops short of asking them to get back together, instead introducing them to Umi, who would help take one last family photo of them. Umi also brings out Yuu, Nina and Nozomu to take a photo of themselves alongside Maki. After they return to the party venue, Yuu and Umi spot their old school friends Sanae and Manaka, who were also invited to the party. Umi accepts their apology and they reconcile. Finally, after the party concludes, Umi and Maki walk together to the former's home for Umi to change out of her party outfit. They then walk to another spot where Maki finally confesses his love to Umi, and they share a kiss on the lips.
11	"New Year's as Lovers"; Transliteration: ""Koibito" to no Nenmatsu Nenshi" (Japanese: 『恋人』との年末年始)	Noriaki Akitaya	Keiichirō Ōchi	Hideki Tachibana	June 16, 2026
Maki wakes up on Christmas Day with a fever. Umi quickly goes to see him, then take him to the hospital and back to the Asanagi house, where he rests in a spare room. Worried for Maki due to his illness, Umi watches over Maki for the rest of the day and brings a futon to sleep next to him in the spare room. The next day, Umi brings Yuu and Nina to her place to visit the ill Maki. Yuu and Nina are quickly kicked out for making distasteful comments regarding Maki and Umi's relationship. After Maki recovers, he gets to kiss Umi on the lips again before visiting the New Year's shrine with her, Yuu and Nina.
12	"To a New Season"; Transliteration: "Atarashii Kisetsu e" (Japanese: 新しい季節へ)	Hideki Tachibana	Keiichirō Ōchi	Hideki Tachibana	June 23, 2026
On Valentine's Day, Umi makes chocolate with Yuu and Nina at Yuu's home. However, she does not like how her chocolate turned out, and takes the ingredients back to her own home to continue making the chocolate she intends to give to Maki. Maki finds out from Yuu and Nina when they arrive at his apartment without Umi. He decides to visit Umi himself, and sees the multiple failed attempts at chocolate cake from Umi. Maki lets Umi have another go under his watch, and the chocolate cake turns out well this time. A month later, on White Day, Maki returns the favor by giving a batch of candy to Umi, having read from somewhere that candy symbolizes love. Umi's birthday is then celebrated on April 3 at Yuu's home with Yuu, Nina, Sanae, Manaka and Maki. Maki's present, a pair of blue flower-patterned hair clips, is the last one to be presented to Umi. After Umi and Maki leave Yuu's home together to return to their own homes, Yuu begins to wonder who she will fall in love with.

== Reception ==
In the 2024 edition of Takarajimasha's annual light novel guide book Kono Light Novel ga Sugoi!, the novel series ranked 21st in the bunkobon category. The novel series ranked seventh in the Next Light Novel Award 2022, and won the Next Light Novel Award 2023 in the bunkobon category hosted by Kimirano.

The series has over 1.6 million copies in circulation.
