= The Unwanted Undead Adventurer =

Japanese light novel series

- First light novel volume cover

望まぬ不死の冒険者 (Nozomanu Fushi no Bōkensha)
- Genre: Dark fantasy
- Novel series
- Written by: Yū Okano
- Published by: Shōsetsuka ni Narō
- Original run: September 22, 2016 – present
- Light novel
- Written by: Yū Okano
- Illustrated by: Jaian
- Published by: Overlap
- English publisher: NA: J-Novel Club
- Imprint: Overlap Novels
- Original run: October 25, 2017 – present
- Volumes: 14
- Manga
- Written by: Yū Okano
- Illustrated by: Haiji Nakasone
- Published by: Overlap
- English publisher: NA: J-Novel Club
- Magazine: Comic Gardo
- Original run: November 24, 2017 – present
- Volumes: 14
- Anime television series
- Directed by: Noriaki Akitaya
- Produced by: Mitsuhiro Nanbara; Takashi Soyama; Yoshito Danno; Satoshi Yoshida; Hiromi Inoue; Akira Kubota; Yasuichirou Shinbo
- Written by: Yukie Sugawara
- Music by: Shun Narita
- Studio: Connect
- Licensed by: Crunchyroll (streaming); SA/SEA: Muse Communication
- Original network: AT-X, Tokyo MX, SUN, BS NTV
- Original run: January 8, 2024 – present
- Episodes: 12
- icon

The Unwanted Undead Adventurer (Japanese: 望まぬ不死の冒険者, Hepburn: Nozomanu Fushi no Bōkensha) is a Japanese light novel series written by Yū Okano and illustrated by Jaian. It has been serialized online via the user-generated novel publishing website Shōsetsuka ni Narō since September 2016. It was later acquired by Overlap, who have published fourteen volumes since October 2017 under their Overlap Novels imprint.

A manga adaptation illustrated by Haiji Nakasone has been serialized in Overlap's Comic Gardo website since November 2017, with its chapters collected into fourteen tankōbon volumes as of August 2026. An anime television series adaptation produced by Connect aired from January to March 2024. A second season has been announced.

== Plot ==
Rentt Faina is a 25-year-old who has been a Bronze-class adventurer for a decade. One day while he is in the Labyrinth of the Moon's Reflection, he finds an undiscovered path. However, he comes across a dragon's lair and is devoured. Sometime later, Rentt awakens as an undead skeleton. He soon begins a quest to achieve Existential Evolution so he can rejoin civilization.

== Characters ==
Rentt Faina (レント・ファイナ, Rento Faina)
Voiced by: Ryōta Suzuki, Anna Nagase^{Ep. 12 credits} (young) (Japanese); Alex Hom (English)
A 25-year-old Bronze-class adventurer who is eaten by a dragon, but later resurrects as an animate skeleton. He is noted to be a helpful presence in the town of Maalt, providing guidance and assistance for new adventurers. He is oblivious to the romantic feelings of many of his female acquaintances, particularly Lorraine.
Lorraine Vivie (ロレーヌ・ヴィヴィエ, Rorēnu Vivie)
Voiced by: Mikako Komatsu (Japanese); Corey Pettit (English)
A high level magician, scholar and part-time Silver-class adventurer who allows Rentt to live with her before and after his resurrection to help him figure out his condition. She is in love with Rentt, tending to get jealous when he makes new female acquaintances.
Sheila Ibarss (シェイラ・イバルス, Sheira Ibarusu)
Voiced by: Ikumi Hasegawa (Japanese); Katie Caruso (English)
A guild employee who helps Rentt with his adventurer work. She cares very deeply for Rentt.
Rina Rupaage (リナ・ルパージュ, Rina Rupāju)
Voiced by: Sayumi Suzushiro (Japanese); Abigail Blythe (English)
A new adventurer whom Rentt rescues after his resurrection when she is attacked by undead. She repays the favor by buying him clothing to hide his monstrous ghoul body in Maalt.
Mysterious Woman (謎の女性, Nazo no Josei)
Voiced by: Saori Hayami (Japanese); Natalie Van Sistine (English)
A very powerful magic user who tries to kill Rentt when he goes into an unknown area of a labyrinth. In compensation for her misunderstanding, she gives him some very rare magic items.
Rize Dunner (ライズ・ダナー, Raizu Danā)
Voiced by: Genta Nakamura (Japanese); Aiden Call (English)
A young swordsman who Rentt sees in the labyrinth. He is in a party with Laura. He is put in a party with Rentt for their Bronze-class practical exam.
Laura Satii (ローラ・サティ, Rōra Sati)
Voiced by: Aya Yamane (Japanese); Lexa Childress (English)
A young magic user who Rent sees in the labyrinth. She is in a party with Rize. She is put in a party with Rentt for their Bronze-class practical exam.
Wolff (ウルフ, Urufu)
Voiced by: Tetsu Inada
He is the guildmaster for the city of Maalt.
Alize (アリゼ, Arize)
Voiced by: Yukina Shuto
A precocious girl at the Maalt Orphanage. She appears to be around 10 years old and older than the rest of the children. She wants to become an adventurer and a magician.
Lillian (リリアン, Ririan)
Voiced by: Yūko Sasaki
A sister of the Eastern Sky Church who runs the orphanage in Maalt. She is sick with Malaccumula, a disease that when she uses her divine magic, she gets a rebound effect of evil magic slowly building up in her body. It can only be cured by medicine made from the Dragonblood Flower that grows in a poisonous swamp.
Edel (エーデル, Ēderu)
Voiced by: Chihiro Takaoka
A rat Rentt found in the basement of the orphanage. Edel became Rentt's familiar after he attacked and bit him. He appears to be able to use some of Rentt's magical abilities.
Isaac Hart (イザーク・ハルト, Izāku Haruto)
Voiced by: Shun'ichi Toki
A male elf who Rentt meets while gathering the Dragonblood Flower in a poisonous swamp. Isaac works as a servant in the Latour household, one of the oldest and most respected houses in Maalt.
Laura Latour (ラウラ・ラトゥール, Raura Ratoūru)
Voiced by: Tomori Kusunoki
The head of the Latour household. She seems to be a polite, albeit a little mischievous, young lady around 15 years old. Her family has a very extensive collection of magic items, monster parts and other very rare items.

== Media ==
=== Light novels ===
Written by Yū Okano, The Unwanted Undead Adventurer began publication online via the user-generated novel publishing website Shōsetsuka ni Narō on September 22, 2016. The series was later acquired by Overlap, who began publishing the novels with illustrations by Jaian on October 25, 2017, under their Overlap Novels imprint. As of December 25, 2024, fourteen volumes have been released. In February 2018, J-Novel Club announced that it had licensed the novels in North America.

==== Volumes ====
No.	Original release date	Original ISBN	English release date	English ISBN
1	October 25, 2017	978-4-86554-240-0	May 2, 2018	978-1-71835-740-2
2	December 25, 2017	978-4-86554-292-9	July 17, 2018	978-1-71835-741-9
3	May 25, 2018	978-4-86554-352-0	October 22, 2018	978-1-71832-104-5
4	November 25, 2018	978-4-86554-418-3	April 28, 2019	978-1-71832-106-9
5	May 25, 2019	978-4-86554-499-2	March 29, 2020	978-1-71832-108-3
6	November 25, 2019	978-4-86554-575-3	August 30, 2020	978-1-71832-110-6
7	May 25, 2020	978-4-86554-665-1	December 12, 2020	978-1-71832-112-0
8	November 25, 2020	978-4-86554-787-0	June 22, 2021	978-1-71832-114-4
9	June 25, 2021	978-4-86554-941-6	November 30, 2021	978-1-71832-116-8
10	April 25, 2022	978-4-8240-0166-5	January 9, 2023	978-1-71832-118-2
11	October 25, 2022	978-4-8240-0314-0	June 23, 2023	978-1-71832-120-5
12	May 25, 2023	978-4-8240-0503-8	January 12, 2024	978-1-71832-122-9
13	December 25, 2023	978-4-8240-0687-5	August 1, 2024	978-1-71832-124-3
14	December 25, 2024	978-4-8240-0766-7	November 7, 2025	978-1-71832-126-7

=== Manga ===
A manga adaptation illustrated by Haiji Nakasone began serialization online via Overlap's Comic Gardo website on November 24, 2017. As of August 20, 2026, fourteen tankōbon volumes have been released. In April 2019, J-Novel Club announced that it had also licensed the manga.

==== Volumes ====
No.	Original release date	Original ISBN	English release date	English ISBN
1	May 25, 2018	978-4-8655-4355-1	November 13, 2019	978-1-71-834790-8
2	November 25, 2018	978-4-8655-4420-6	March 11, 2020	978-1-71-834791-5
3	May 25, 2019	978-4-8655-4503-6	July 8, 2020	978-1-71-834792-2
4	November 25, 2019	978-4-8655-4578-4	September 10, 2020	978-1-71-834793-9
5	May 25, 2020	978-4-8655-4672-9	March 3, 2021	978-1-71-834794-6
6	November 25, 2020	978-4-8655-4796-2	July 7, 2021	978-1-71-834795-3
7	June 25, 2021	978-4-8655-4951-5	January 27, 2022	978-1-71-834796-0
8	November 25, 2021	978-4-8240-0056-9	June 29, 2022	978-1-71-834797-7
9	April 25, 2022	978-4-8240-0175-7	December 8, 2022	978-1-71-834798-4
10	October 25, 2022	978-4-8240-0322-5	November 4, 2023	978-1-71-834799-1
11	May 25, 2023	978-4-8240-0513-7	April 26, 2024	978-1-71-834800-4
12	December 25, 2023	978-4-8240-0698-1	February 12, 2025	978-1-71-834801-1
13	August 25, 2025	978-4-8240-1320-0	—	—
14	August 20, 2026	978-4-8240-1815-1	—	—

=== Anime ===
An anime television series adaptation was announced at the "Overlap Bunko 9th Anniversary Online Event" on April 17, 2022. It was produced by Connect and directed by Noriaki Akitaya, with scripts written by Yukie Sugawara, character designs handled by Takao Sano, and music composed by Shun Narita. The series aired from January 8 to March 25, 2024, on AT-X and other networks. The opening theme song is "Immortal", performed by Juvenile, and the ending theme song is "Keep Your Fire Burning", performed by Mao Abe. Crunchyroll is streaming the series. Muse Communication licensed the series in South and Southeast Asia.

A second season was announced at the Overlap Bunko 10th anniversary event on December 15, 2024.

==== Episodes ====
No.	Title (Note: All English titles are taken from Crunchyroll.)	Directed by	Written by	Storyboarded by	Original release date (Note: Episodes were released on select platforms (such as D Anime Store, Netflix and Crunchyroll) three days before their air dates on television.)
1	"Unwanted Undead"; Transliteration: "Nozomanu Fushi" (Japanese: 望まぬ不死)	Noriaki Akitaya	Yukie Sugawara	Toshiki Fukushima	January 8, 2024
Rentt Faina is an unskilled adventurer who has been stuck at Bronze-class for ten years, but manages to scrape a living through hard work. While exploring the Moon's Reflection Labyrinth, he stumbles across a completely undiscovered tunnel which he explores alone. Unfortunately, he finds himself in a dragon's lair and is devoured. Sometime later, Rentt finds himself mysteriously resurrected as an undead skeleton. As undead are blasphemous, Rentt cannot return home in case a priest destroys him. After killing another skeleton, he absorbs its spirit energy and remembers monsters can evolve with enough spirit energy. He thus makes it his goal to evolve into a ghoul, since ghouls do possess flesh, making it possible to disguise himself and return home to get help. After killing skeletons and slimes in one day, he gets used to his new body, regains his former magic skills, and slowly realizes he is becoming stronger and more skilled with his sword than when he was human. He finally evolves into a ghoul, giving him hope he can return home, but first he must relearn how to speak using his desiccated, half rotted ghoul vocal cords.
2	"The Rookie and the Veteran"; Transliteration: "Kakedashi to Beteran" (Japanese: 駆け出しとベテラン)	Shun Tsuchida	Yukie Sugawara	Toshiki Fukushima	January 15, 2024
Regaining flesh lets Rentt fight stronger monsters and use more powerful spells, confirming he is much stronger than his human body. He witnesses a novice adventurer named Rina Rupaage and decides to stay hidden, but when Rina unknowingly enters a dangerous area, he steps in and saves her. Having regained some speech, Rentt is able to explain what happened to him, so Rina agrees to buy him clothes so he can leave the labyrinth. She returns with a black coat, boots, gloves and an iron mask. The mask turns out to be a cursed item she unknowingly bought from a shady merchant that attaches to Rentt's face and cannot be removed. He decides to put up with it since he has to hide his face anyway and will ask a priest to remove it later. For her mistake, Rina assists him returning home to Maalt village. They manage to pass the border guards by blaming his appearance and voice on the cursed mask. Once inside, Rentt sneaks away, not wanting to put Rina at further risk of discovery, but will see her again someday. He decides to visit his friend Lorraine Vivie, a Silver-class adventurer who recognizes him immediately.
3	"The Undead Infiltrates the Town"; Transliteration: "Fushisha, Machi ni Shin'nyū" (Japanese: 不死者、街に侵入)	Yūsuke Tomita	Yukie Sugawara	Haifeng Liang	January 22, 2024
Lorraine, who is secretly in love with Rentt, decides he can live with her. She also acts as his proxy for guild matters. Rentt commissions a new sword from Clope the blacksmith that can tolerate his stronger magic. Meanwhile, Lorraine recalls in her youth how nothing interested her; even becoming a doctor and Silver-class adventurer did not fill her with pride until a friend asked her to tutor Rentt, who was an Iron-ranked novice. As her Silver-class was awarded as part of her doctorate, she realized Rentt was superior to her in actual adventuring. She decided to learn from him instead, which ultimately caused her to fall in love. Clope secretly recognizes Rentt but decides to honor Rentt's desire for privacy until he is ready to ask for help. Rentt returns to the dungeon, hoping to evolve again into something more human-looking. There, he encounters a chef forced to start adventuring due to heavy debts. Deciding to help, Rentt takes him to the empty dragon's lair hoping to find undiscovered treasure, but the chef blunders into a teleportation circle. When Rentt follows him, they find themselves in a secret boss room facing the undead skeleton of a giant.
4	"Existential Evolution"; Transliteration: "Sonzai Shinka" (Japanese: 存在進化)	Tsutomu Murakami	Yukie Sugawara	Yūya Horiuchi	January 29, 2024
Rentt defeats the giant and gives the chef its magic stone. In gratitude, the chef agrees to visit shops for Rentt and give him meals at his restaurant. Rentt notices another teleportation circle that leads deeper into the unexplored area. The chef, Lorris, and his wife Isabel are grateful so Rentt trusts them to keep his name secret. Rentt finds his mind affected by dark impulses and his mask's mouthpiece magically vanishes, allowing him to bite an unsuspecting Lorraine. Her blood returns his sanity before she angrily knocks him out. Awakening, Rentt heals her wound but admits he has cannibalistic urges. The mask, while still stuck to his face, now responds to his thoughts and can reveal his mouth or eyes at will. Lorraine realizes he has achieved Existential Evolution and by drinking her blood, he actually evolved into a ghast. Rentt realizes if he keeps evolving, he could become a human-looking vampire. Lorraine agrees to help in exchange for letting her examine his body for academic research. As his sword is still not finished, Rentt borrows a temporary one from Clope so he can visit the unexplored area. Rentt notices Lorris and Isabel have reopened their restaurant.
5	"Undead Adventurer"; Transliteration: "Fushi no Bōkensha" (Japanese: 不死の冒険者)	Yoshinobu Kasai	Yukie Sugawara	Haifeng Liang	February 5, 2024
Lorraine discovers Rentt is immune to poison, no longer requires sleep, and can keep his cannibalistic urges away with drops of blood. Rentt later learns he was actually popular at the guild so if he tries to take a quest using his own name, people will definitely ask questions. Instead, Rentt re-registers as a novice but changes his surname to Vivie to pose as Lorraine's distant relative. He is surprised guild secretary Sheila Ibarss is still upset "Rentt" went missing. Rentt explores more of the unexplored area and discovers a mysterious woman guarding a room with a skeleton. At first, she attacks him for grave robbing but after seeing his ghast body, she replaces his destroyed clothing with her own cloak. She also gives him an Acacia Map that will record everywhere he travels in exchange for keeping her location secret. Lorraine is impressed; the map is as valuable as a national treasure and the cloak is magic resistant and stronger than armor. Rentt tries to visit the woman again but finds she has sealed off the area. Most of the guild start to really miss Rentt as they actually learned adventuring from him as novices.
6	"Bronze-class Exam"; Transliteration: "Dō-kyū Shiken" (Japanese: 銅級試験)	Noriaki Akitaya	Yasushi Shigenobu	Koji Sawai	February 12, 2024
Rentt is given the opportunity to graduate from Iron-class to Bronze-class. He earns a perfect score on the written exam. For the practical exam, he is partnered up with swordsman Rize Dunner and sorceress Laura Satii, to compete with other parties to be the first to reach a specified room in the New Moon Labyrinth by sunset. Rentt spots the first obstacle: the maps are old and unreliable, so they buy a new one. Rize and Laura are shocked to be ambushed by another party, but realize such tactics are normal due to there being no rules, and swiftly defeat them with Rentt's help. After they leave, a nearby examiner is impressed Rentt noticed their attackers were also examiners tasked with making the exam more difficult. Guildmaster Wolff asks Sheila to keep an eye on Rentt as his sudden appearance and advanced skills are suspicious. Rentt's party reach their goal, a boss room. Another party also arrives but due to their arrogance, Rentt lets them go first. Watching them be swiftly defeated confirms more examiners are nearby to ensure no one actually dies, making Rize and Laura more confident as they enter the boss room for their turn.
7	"Magical Contract"; Transliteration: "Majutsu Keiyaku" (Japanese: 魔術契約)	Tsutomu Murakami	Yasushi Shigenobu	Koji Sawai	February 19, 2024
The boss turns out to be a Grand Slime. Rentt opts not to fight so Rize and Laura can gain combat experience and they eventually destroy the slime. As the first party to arrive, they are promoted to Bronze-class and also receive potions and a carrying case. On the way back, Rentt shows Rize and Laura how challenging labyrinths can be as one floor is a giant forest whose geography changes constantly. Rize and Laura depart but hope to see Rentt again. Sheila finally asks Rentt if he is actually the Rentt Faina who went missing. Rentt is unsure about telling her, so she signs a magic contract that will make her his slave for life if she reveals the secret. Once Rentt tells her everything, she decides to help him. Lorraine is suspicious and considers murdering Sheila to protect Rentt, but is eventually convinced of her good intentions. Sheila reveals novice adventurers have been mysteriously disappearing throughout the kingdom and the guild is treating it as a mass kidnapping. Wolff suspects Rentt is the kidnapper so Rentt decides to avoid the guild for several days while Sheila convinces Wolff he is trustworthy.
8	"A New Weapon and Power"; Transliteration: "Arata na Buki to Chikara" (Japanese: 新たな武器と力)	Shun Tsuchida	Yukie Sugawara	Kazuhisa Takenouchi	February 26, 2024
While receiving his sword from Clope, Rentt learns of a powerful new technique that might be the key to reaching Mythril-class, but to use it, he will need high quality equipment. The only problem is how to make money while avoiding the guild. Fortunately, Rentt encounters Ryuntus from Tottsu village offering a job not sanctioned by the guild. Ryuntus' sister is going to become a sacrifice to the Lake Lord, which is a ritual involving young girls to ensure the village will not destroyed. When they arrive, Rentt meets Ryuntus' sister, Amiris, but she scolds Ryuntus for bringing Rentt as she has agreed to be sacrificed. Rentt sees a couple of suspicious traders he does not trust. During the sacrifice, Rentt, Ryuntus, and Amiris all watch as the Lake Lord appears. Rentt deduces it is actually an illusion spell cast by the traders. After defeating them, they admit they used the ploy to kidnap the girls and sell them as slaves. With all the girls rescued, Rentt receives payment and a surprise kiss from Amiris. As the traders only targeted young girls, Rentt concludes they are not involved with the missing adventurers.
9	"Dragonblood Flower"; Transliteration: "Ryūketsu Hana" (Japanese: 竜血花)	Yūsuke Tomita	Yukie Sugawara	Yūsuke Tomita	March 4, 2024
Sheila asks Rentt to find a Dragonblood Rose, even though the quest only pays one bronze coin. Dragonbloods are linked to a legendary love between a dragon and a human. Rentt agrees as they also make powerful medicine and the quest was posted by the Maalt orphanage. Rentt learns from Alize that the headmistress, Lillian, has Malaccumula, a disease that makes her sick when she uses magic and will kill her one day. Rentt also deals with rat monsters in their basement but when the boss rat bites him, his blood tames it into his familiar, a power usually found in vampires. An impressed Lorraine names the rat Edel. Lorraine discovers Rentt can eat normal food if it contains her blood. Rentt travels to Tarasque Swamp where being undead luckily protects him from the poisonous air. While discussing Rentt's work in Tottsu, which he refused to publicly take credit for, Sheila and Lorraine realize they do not know why Rentt is fixated on reaching Mythril-class. While fighting a Tarasque Dragon, Rentt discovers Edel can use his magic. After defeating and harvesting the Tarasque, Rentt finds the Dragonbloods as well as a male elf.
10	"A Strange Man and a Strange Job"; Transliteration: "Kimyō na Otoko to Kimyō na Irai" (Japanese: 奇妙な男と奇妙な依頼)	Tsutomu Murakami	Yukie Sugawara	Toshiki Fukushima	March 11, 2024
The elf, Isaac Hart, requires Dragonblood medicine for his ill employer and offers Rentt a job to regularly deliver more Dragonbloods to him. As Tarasque dragons are famously difficult to defeat, Rentt secretly takes it to the guild's monster butcher, Dario. Rentt later delivers a Dragonblood to Alize and also gives extra ones to healer Umberto and herbalist Norman. At Edel's urging, the remaining rat monsters agree to protect the orphanage. Alize decides to become an adventurer like Rentt, so he asks Lorraine to teach her magic. Lorraine decides to blow him up when he unintentionally suggests she is no longer young, but when he desperately showers her in compliments, she becomes embarrassed. Rentt learns Isaac works for the mysterious and powerful Latour family. As refusing a request from them would be dangerous, Rentt visits their mansion but learns from their security guard access is only granted by successfully making it through a constantly changing maze. His only clue to make it through being that the sun cannot help him. Rentt is confident as the maze appears quite small. However, after several hours, he becomes hopelessly lost.
11	"The Garden Labyrinth"; Transliteration: "Teien Meikyū" (Japanese: 庭園迷宮)	Masato Jinbo	Yukie Sugawara	Koichi Ohata	March 18, 2024
Rentt eventually makes his way to the center of the maze and speaks to a young woman and discovers she is a collector of magical items found in labyrinths. After receiving the same hint about not relying on the sun, he continues onward. He realizes the maze is actually teleporting him around. Once he finally exits the maze, he finds the mansion and the girl, who introduces herself as Laura, head of the Latour family. Rentt is then offered his reward. At first, he is drawn to a mana-controlled airship model, but the high mana consumption makes it impractical for scouting and is more like a toy. After accidentally summoning then defeating a golem, Rentt is drawn to a vial of vampire blood which, in theory, could turn him into a human-looking vampire straight away. Due to the uncertainty, Rentt takes the airship as his reward and forms a contract to keep supplying Laura with Dragonbloods. Rentt is surprised to also be rewarded the vampire blood for free. Lorraine wishes he would not take the risk and remain as he is now, but is also aware of Rentt's burning desire to evolve and become a Mythril-class adventurer.
12	"Rentt Faina"; Transliteration: "Rento Faina" (Japanese: レント・ファイナ)	Noriaki Akitaya	Yukie Sugawara	Noriaki Akitaya	March 25, 2024
Wanting to understand his motivation, Lorraine finally asks Rentt why he wants to reach Mythril-class so much. Rentt explains that as a child, he was very shy while his friend Jinlin was the one who wanted to be an adventurer. One day, they were attacked by a wolf monster that killed his parents and her grandmother. Jinlin died protecting him but Rentt was saved and mentored by a Mythril-class adventurer named Wilfried Ryukker. Since then, Rentt has dreamed of reaching Mythril-class so he can show Wilfried he made it. Lorraine allows him to drink the blood, which starts painfully mutating him. Days later, Clope works on an even stronger sword for Rentt, Alize is pleased when Lillian starts to recover, and Rize and Laura form a party with Rina. Rentt finally awakens with a human appearance while Lorraine confirms he successfully evolved into some sort of vampire. Unfortunately, the mask is still stuck in place but Lorraine is happy to see his face again. Rentt wants to see Wilfried but hears rumors he left the country, plus he has not reached Mythril-class yet. Lorraine decides if Rentt does leave, she will go with him.

== Reception ==
Rebecca Silverman and Lynzee Loveridge of Anime News Network reviewed the first volume of the light novel in 2018, praising Rentt's goal as "an interesting goal, and a hopeful one if you're looking for the potential harem romance that's lurking within the plot, and it does help to make this novel stand out in the crowded field of fantasy that draws directly from role playing games". They criticized the repetitive nature of the writing, but noted that it "does lessen as the book goes on, which is a very good sign for volume two". They concluded, "This isn't a perfect or particularly polished novel, but it is interesting enough to merit at least one more volume, because with the pesky set up out of the way, this could go places."
