= Circlet Princess =

Japanese video game

- Promotional art for the anime.

サークレット・プリンセス (Sākuretto Purinsesu)
- Video game
- Developer: DMM Games
- Music by: Elements Garden
- Genre: Role-playing
- Platform: Web browser
- Released: 2018–2020
- Anime television series
- Directed by: Hideki Tachibana
- Produced by: Toshio Okada; Hirotaka Imagawa; Terushige Yoshie
- Written by: Nachi Kio
- Music by: Yōichi Sakai
- Studio: Silver Link
- Licensed by: SEA: Medialink
- Original network: Tokyo MX, TV Saitama, AT-X
- Original run: January 8, 2019 – March 26, 2019
- Episodes: 12
- Manga

Circlet Princess -First Bout-
- Written by: Nachi Kio, DMM Games
- Illustrated by: Ponkotsu Works
- Published by: Kadokawa
- Magazine: Dengeki Maoh
- Original run: January 27, 2018 – February 27, 2019
- Volumes: 2
- icon

Circlet Princess (Japanese: サークレット・プリンセス, Hepburn: Sākuretto Purinsesu) is a Japanese role-playing browser game developed by DMM Games. An anime television series adaptation by Silver Link aired from January 8 to March 26, 2019.

== Synopsis ==
Many years into the future, advances in technology and virtual reality have changed Japan, leading to many applications in the real world, such as security, businesses, transportation and even the development of a new sport called Circlet Bout, an event played by many schools across the country. Mixed Reality, the technology used in Circlet Bout, can be used to store data about the players, such as their academic skills, and generate weapon for matches.

By sheer coincidence, Yuka Sasaki gets involved in a Circlet Bout match against Chikage Fujimura, the best player in Japan. Despite her inexperience, Yūka holds her own against Chikage and both players develop a respect for one another. Yūka gets inspired to become a CB player and, two years later, she transfers to a school in Tokyo in order to accomplish her dream. Upon her arrival, she finds out the school's CB club has been closed down, so she sets out to re-open it with her new friends.

== Characters ==
Yūka Sasaki (佐々木優佳, Sasaki Yūka)
Voiced by: Juri Nagatsuma
The protagonist. After her fateful match with Chikage, Yūka decides to become a CB player and sets out to re-open her new school's CB club. Her CB weapon is a sword. It, later on, revealed that she is capable of exploiting the "Overheat Phenomenon" that allows her to do short-cut attacks while simultaneously defending. She has a habit of putting Umeboshi or dried plums in her food.
Miyuki Kasahara (笠原美由紀, Kasahara Miyuki)
Voiced by: Saki Nakajima
An athletic girl who develops an interest in Yūka after seeing her video of her fight with Chikage. Even before Yūka's arrival, she was already trying to revive the Union school's CB club but Yūka might be the opportunity she needs to bring the club back to its former glory. Her CB weapon is a double-bladed shuriken. She used to compete in track and field in middle school, but later on quit after being wrongfully accused of cheating, among the members of the circlet club she came from a rich family who owns a chain of shoe stores.
Reina Kuroda (黒田怜奈, Kuroda Reina)
Voiced by: Hitomi Nabatame
The Union school's student council president and the younger sister of famous CB player Ayana Kuroda. She initially opposes the reconstruction of the Union's CB club but she is forced to accept it when an opposing school issues a challenge for a practice match.
Ayumu Aizawa (相沢歩, Aizawa Ayumu)
Voiced by: Kaori Mizuhashi
A computer expert who helps Yūka and Miyuki re-open the Union school's CB club as the manager. She often wears an oversize White coat that used to belong to her father, who is one of the developers of the Circlet Bout and the technology around it. Initially, she has no interest in the Circlet Bout until her father's disappearance, where she got involve in order to track down her father's presence. In the Circlet Bout, she is basically tasked to analyze the opponent's capability and coming up with strategies that give her team the advantage. She doesn't actually compete in any bouts, but if she does, she is armed with a riot shield, but unlike the rest of her team who can take both offensive and defensive position, she is more on the defensive position where she relies on the arsenal of weapons that she installed in her shield that doesn't do her any good since she lacks any training to dodge any coming attacks.
Nina Avelin (ニーナ・アヴェリン, Nīna Averin)
Voiced by: Mai Goto
She is a foreign student at St. Union who is from Russia, she was recruited by Miyuki to join the circlet club and was designated as a reliever, in case any of the members weren't available to do battle in any Circlet bout for some reasons. She is very much stoic and laconic, often prefers to be alone. She spends most of her free time playing FPS on-line games where she excels in sniping, she uses a rifle as her weapon because she is more adept in taking down opponents from a distance than in close range. She also has a voracious appetite, where she can chug down a 2-liter cola bottle in just one sitting and still have enough room for other snacks.
Chikage Fujimura (藤村千景, Fujimura Chikage)
Voiced by: Atsumi Tanezaki
The top CB player in Japan. She gets impressed by Yūka's skill during an exhibition match and hopes they can play together again. It, later on, revealed that just like Yuka, she too can also exploit the "Overheat Phenomenon."
Takane Hibino (日比野貴音, Hibino Takane)
Voiced by: Natsuki Aikawa
Sarina Sekiguchi (関口サリナ, Sekiguchi Sarina)
Voiced by: Sachie Hirai
Hiyori Sugiura (杉浦日和, Sugiura Hiyori)
Voiced by: Yuna Taniguchi
Kasumi Iida (飯田霞, Īda Kasumi)
Voiced by: Megumi Tateishi
Akira Tsunemi (常見アキラ, Tsunemi Akira)
Voiced by: Nozomi Chikamura
Arisa Hara (原アリサ, Hara Arisa)
Voiced by: Yuka Maruyama
Christie Yamauchi (山内クリスティ, Yamauchi Kurisuti)
Voiced by: Aya Fujita
Kaoru Yoshimura (芳村薫, Yoshimura Kaoru)
Voiced by: Harumi Sakurai
Siegfried (ジークフリート, Jīkufurīto)/Makoto Aizawa (相沢 真琴, Aizawa Makoto)
Voiced by: Ryō Horikawa
Siegfried is basically an AI bracelet that was given to Yuka after her exhibition match against Chikage. It is initially tasked to help improve her fighting skills, but from time to time it would also give her some moral advice.

== Media ==
=== Game ===
DMM Games released the role-playing browser game in 2018. The game's world and scenario were created by Nachi Kio, character designs were provided by saitom, and Elements Garden produced the game's sound.

=== Anime ===
An anime television series adaptation was announced on August 9, 2018. The series is directed by Hideki Tachibana and written by Nachi Kio, with animation by studio Silver Link. Kazuyuki Yamayoshi is adapting the character designs from saitom's original illustrations. The series' music is composed by Yōichi Sakai and produced by Lantis. The series aired from January 8 to March 26, 2019, on Tokyo MX and AT-X. The series' opening theme song is "HEAT:Moment." by Miyuki Hashimoto while the series' ending theme song is "Circle-Lets Friends!" by Hashimoto, Sayaka Sasaki, Aki Misato, CooRie, Yozuca*, and Minami. The series ran for 12 episodes.

==== Episode ====
No.	Title	Original release date
1	"Princess Strike"; Transliteration: "Purinsesu sutoraiku" (Japanese: プリンセス・ストライク)	January 8, 2019
2	"Starting Mind"; Transliteration: "Sutātingu maindo" (Japanese: スターティング・マインド)	January 15, 2019
3	"Surprise Player"; Transliteration: "Sapurisu pureiyā" (Japanese: サプライズ・プレイヤー)	January 22, 2019
4	"Complex Sister"; Transliteration: "Konpurekkusu shisutā" (Japanese: コンプレックス・シスター)	January 29, 2019
5	"Breaking Down"; Transliteration: "Bureikingu daun" (Japanese: ブレイキング・ダウン)	February 5, 2019
6	"Extreme Game"; Transliteration: "Ekusutorīmu gēmu" (Japanese: エクストリーム・ゲーム)	February 12, 2019
7	"Sweet Dreams"; Transliteration: "Suwīto dorīmusu" (Japanese: スウィート・ドリームス)	February 19, 2019
8	"Revenge Match"; Transliteration: "Ribenji matchi" (Japanese: リベンジ・マッチ)	February 26, 2019
9	"Homecoming"; Transliteration: "Kikyō" (Japanese: 帰郷)	March 5, 2019
10	"Evolution Girl"; Transliteration: "Eboryūshon gāru" (Japanese: エボリューション・ ガール)	March 12, 2019
11	"Grand Final"; Transliteration: "Gurando fainaru" (Japanese: グランド・ファイナル)	March 19, 2019
12	"Circlet Princess"; Transliteration: "Sākuretto purinsesu" (Japanese: サークレット・プリンセス)	March 26, 2019
