= Tsutomu Satō (author) =

Japanese novelist

- 佐島 勤
- Occupation: Novelist
- Writing career
- Period: 2011–present
- Genres: Novel, light novel, action, fantasy, science fiction, science fantasy
- Notable work: The Irregular at Magic High School
- Website: tsutomusato.jp

Tsutomu Satō (佐島 勤, Satō Tsutomu) is a Japanese novelist known for his light novel series The Irregular at Magic High School.

== Biography ==
From 2008 to 2011, while working an office job, Satō serially published his writing on the Japanese web fiction website Shōsetsuka ni Narō under the pseudonym Tsutomu Satō. He has said that since he was a child, he enjoyed imagining fictional worlds and started writing online as a creative outlet. He submitted an unpublished work to the 16th Dengeki Novel Prize under a different pen name but did not qualify. As of December 2011, his Shōsetsuka ni Narō account and works have been deleted and cannot be read.

In July 2011, his series The Irregular at Magic High School debuted under the ASCII Media Works imprint Dengeki Bunko where it was published from 2011 to 2020. Despite his series' success, Satō remains working part-time at his office job to support his career.

From November 2012 to September 2013, the serial magazine Dengeki Bunko Magazine printed The Irregular at Magic High School.

== Writing style ==
In an interview with young adult science fiction book reviewer Mii Mimura, Satō has said he was strongly influenced by various classic science fiction writers and by works published in science fiction light novel publishing labels such as Sonorama Bunko. He was inspired by the works of Baku Yumemakura and Hideyuki Kikuchi, his favorite novel being Kikuchi's Invader Summer (インベーダー・サマー).

In the afterword for the seventh volume of The Irregular at Magic High School, Satō writes "[while this book was not at] the level of extremity that was rather commonplace in the Showa era, I do worry a bit whether this book...hasn’t fallen out of favor with current trends." His author biography labels him a "late-coming juvenile fiction author," acknowledging his style as "old-fashioned" in comparison to his contemporaries.

Discussing his creative process, Satō mentions that he likes to think about scenes he would like to write before writing them. A prolific writer since the beginning of his career, in tandem with his day job, Satō writes around four bunkō volumes a year. In addition to this, he also writes the story for the manga adaptation of The Irregular at Magic High School.

== Personal life ==
He has said his childhood dream job was to be a space rocket engineer or an investor in a space exploration project. According to the author profile in the paperback edition of The Irregular at Magic High School, during his childhood living in the remote Japanese countryside, Satō passed the time by reading and watching foreign and native space opera books and films. He has also said that he was a fan of fantasy and romance novels throughout his young adult years.

While his exact birthplace or date of birth has not been released, in the afterword of the Dengeki Bunko Magazine Volume 31, he said that he attended a boys' highschool.

Kazuma Miki, Satō's supervising editor, said, "He's a very determined person, and his personality shows in his style of writing. He has a knack for writing science-fiction."

== Bibliography ==
- The Irregular at Magic High School (2011–2020) (Published by Dengeki Bunko, illustrated by Kana Ishida)
- The Irregular At Magic High School: Plan to Assassinate Tatsuya Shiba (2018 – ) (Published by Dengeki Bunko, illustrated by Kana Ishida)
- Sequel – The Irregular At Magic High School Magian Company (2020 – ) (Published by Dengeki Bunko, illustrated by Kana Ishida)
- New – The Irregular at Magic High School Maidens of Cygnus (2021 – ) (Published by Dengeki Bunko, illustrated by Kana Ishida)
- Dowlmasters (2014–2018) (Published by Dengeki Bunko, illustrated by tarou2)
- Demonic Marshall series (2016 – ) (Published by Dengeki Bunko, illustrated by Yuuichi Kinugami)
