= The Irregular at Magic High School =

Japanese web novel series and its franchise

- The first light novel volume of The Irregular at Magic High School published by Dengeki Bunko. It features Tatsuya and Miyuki on the cover.

魔法科高校の劣等生 (Mahōka Kōkō no Rettōsei)
- Genre: Action; Romance; Science fantasy
- Novel series
- Written by: Tsutomu Satō
- Published by: Shōsetsuka ni Narō
- Original run: October 12, 2008 – March 21, 2011
- Light novel
- Written by: Tsutomu Satō
- Illustrated by: Kana Ishida
- Published by: ASCII Media Works
- English publisher: NA: Yen Press
- Imprint: Dengeki Bunko
- Original run: July 10, 2011 – September 10, 2020
- Volumes: 32 (Note: Plus six side stories.)
- Anime television series
- Directed by: Manabu Ono (S1); Risako Yoshida (S2); Jimmy Stone (S3)
- Produced by: Yasutaka Kimura; Kazuma Miki (S1); Shinichirou Kashiwada (S1); Kozue Kaneniwa (S1–S2); Masami Niwa (S2); Masatoshi Nakajima (S2); Tatsuya Funatsu (S2–S3); Hitomi Kuroi (S3); Akihiro Sotokawa (S3); Yuugo Nakajima (S3); Tooru Awaji (S3)
- Written by: Muneo Nakamoto; Yukie Sugawara (S1); Yukito Kizawa (S1)
- Music by: Taku Iwasaki
- Studio: Madhouse (S1); Eight Bit (S2–S3)
- Licensed by: AUS: Hanabee; NA: Aniplex of America
- Original network: Tokyo MX, GTV, GYT, MBS, Chiba TV, tvk, TVS, TV Aichi, TVQ, TVh, AT-X, BS11
- English network: SEA: Animax Asia (S1); Aniplus Asia (S1–S2)
- Original run: April 6, 2014 – June 28, 2024
- Episodes: 52
- Light novel

Sequel – The Irregular at Magic High School Magian Company
- Written by: Tsutomu Satō
- Illustrated by: Kana Ishida
- Published by: ASCII Media Works
- Imprint: Dengeki Bunko
- Original run: October 10, 2020 – September 10, 2026
- Volumes: 12
- Light novel

New – The Irregular at Magic High School Maidens of Cygnus
- Written by: Tsutomu Satō
- Illustrated by: Kana Ishida
- Published by: ASCII Media Works
- Imprint: Dengeki Bunko
- Original run: January 9, 2021 – present
- Volumes: 7
- Anime television series

The Honor Student at Magic High School
- Directed by: Hideki Tachibana
- Written by: Tsuyoshi Tamai
- Music by: Taku Iwasaki
- Studio: Connect
- Licensed by: NA: Aniplex of America
- Original network: Tokyo MX, BS11, GTV, GYT, AT-X, MBS, TV Aichi
- Original run: July 3, 2021 – September 25, 2021
- Episodes: 13
- Anime television film

The Irregular at Magic High School: Reminiscence Arc
- Directed by: Risako Yoshida
- Produced by: Yasutaka Kimura; Masatoshi Nakajima; Masami Niwa; Tatsuya Funatsu; Akihiro Sotokawa
- Written by: Muneo Nakamoto
- Music by: Taku Iwasaki
- Studio: Eight Bit; Eight Bit Niigata
- Original network: Tokyo MX
- Released: December 31, 2021
- Runtime: 71 minutes
- Anime film
- The Irregular at Magic High School: The Movie – The Girl Who Summons the Stars
- icon

The Irregular at Magic High School (Japanese: 魔法科高校の劣等生, Hepburn: Mahōka Kōkō no Rettōsei; lit. "The Poor Performing Student of a Magic High School") is a Japanese web novel series by Tsutomu Satō. It was published on Shōsetsuka ni Narō, a web novel website, from October 2008 to March 2011. 32 volumes of the light novel were released by Dengeki Bunko from July 2011 to September 2020.

The story takes place in the 2090s decade of Japan where technology has allowed magic to exist, and follows Tatsuya and Miyuki Shiba, siblings who enroll into the First High magic high school. They attempt to live their daily lives in peace while keeping their connections to the infamous Yotsuba clan secret, but Tatsuya is shunned for his apparent ineptness while Miyuki attracts attention for her magical abilities.

In 2013, each story arc received a manga adaptation with varying manga artists and publishers. That same year, an anime television series adaptation by Madhouse was announced, and aired from April to September 2014. The Irregular at Magic High School franchise has been localized for English by two companies; the light novels and one of the manga adaptations are licensed by Yen Press, while Aniplex of America licensed the anime series. The anime series was simulcast on four networks, and was later made available on Netflix. An anime film featuring an original story by Satō premiered in Japan in June 2017, while a second season taking place after the anime series by Eight Bit aired from October to December 2020. The season was simulcast on Funimation and Hulu. An anime television series adaptation of The Honor Student at Magic High School by Connect aired from July to September 2021. A film adaptation of the series' "Reminiscence Arc" aired in December 2021. A third season premiered in April 2024. A new anime film adapting the series' "Yotsuba Succession Arc" arc premiered in May 2026. A second part of the anime series is in production.

In October 2020, a direct sequel called The Irregular at Magic High School Magian Company began publication. Set after the events of Volume 32, the sequel focuses on Tatsuya and the others after their graduation from high school. A spinoff sequel called New – The Irregular at Magic High School: Maidens of Cygnus began publication in 2021. Its focus is on Katsuto Juumonji and the revelation of a new family member.

The light novels have been well received. The series ranked seventh in Sugoi Japan's 2015 polls, and have been one of the top selling series in Japan with 22 million copies sold. In addition, its manga and anime adaptations also appeared on top-selling charts. The anime adaptation had mixed reviews. While the complex technicality of magic within the series was praised, the exposition was criticized for being unclear and poorly executed.

== Synopsis ==
=== Setting ===
The series is set in a world with an alternate history, where magic exists and has been refined through modern technology. However, the ability to use magic is determined by genetics, limiting the number of magicians in existence. Following a 20-year long Third World War that reduced the world's population to 3 billion, the world's superpowers have shifted to four nations: The United States of North America (USNA), the New Soviet Union, the Great Asian Alliance, and Japan. In Japan, the magic community is informally governed by the Ten Master Clans in lieu of the government. Due to the limited number of magicians, they are treated as a commodity and forced to enter magic-related schools and professions. Nine magic high schools exist in Japan; they each specialize in different aspects of magic and are simply referred to by their numbers.

=== Plot ===
The story follows Tatsuya Shiba, a bodyguard to his sister Miyuki Shiba, who is also a candidate to succeed the leadership of the Yotsuba clan, one of the Ten Master Clans. They enroll into First High which segregates its students based on their magical abilities. Miyuki is enrolled in the first course and viewed as one of the best students, while Tatsuya is placed in the second course and considered to be magically inept. However, Tatsuya's technical knowledge, combat abilities, and unique magic techniques cause people to view him as an irregular to the school's standardized rankings.

== Characters ==
=== Main ===
Tatsuya Shiba (司波 達也, Shiba Tatsuya) and Miyuki Shiba (司波 深雪, Shiba Miyuki)

Tatsuya and Miyuki are siblings of the same school year and children to Tatsurou Shiba and the late Miya Yotsuba with Tatsuya being 11 months older than Miyuki;^{LN 3.2} their parents had a loveless forced marriage, and when their mother died, their father married his mistress, Sayuri Furuha, leaving the siblings to live by themselves.^{LN 6.2}

Maya Yotsuba, their aunt and current leader of the Yotsuba Clan, was the reason Tatsuya was born with the unique magic to decompose, reconstruct, and detonate matter (along with some gene manipulation).^{LN 16.6} Out of fear of his powers, the Yotsuba Clan leadership of that time argued for Tatsuya's death, forcing Miya and Maya to take measures to ensure his survival: the first was Miyuki's creation with genetic enhancements in utero, who would act as a seal to Tatsuya's power; the second was to magically dull Tatsuya's emotions except for his familial love towards Miyuki; and the third was to assign Tatsuya to be Miyuki's bodyguard to develop his sense of loyalty towards her.^{LN 16.6} During a family vacation in Okinawa, Tatsuya warded off an invasion by the Great Asian Alliance and joined the 101 Independent Magic-Equipped Battalion which is headed by Major Kazama Harunobu.^{LN 8.7} At some point during his life, Tatsuya commercialized revolutionary magical technology through his family's company, Four Leaves Technology, under the identity Taurus Silver.^{LN 3.2} He is voiced by Yuichi Nakamura (Japanese) and Alejandro Saab (English).

Miyuki is considered one of the strongest magicians in the world and is a candidate to become the leader of the Yotsuba Clan. Her specialty is freezing magic, and she can freeze a person's consciousness. In addition, half of her magic casting ability is used to seal Tatsuya's powers. Before the family vacation in Okinawa, Miyuki treated Tatsuya as coldly as other Yotsuba Clan members. Afterwards, she began to warm up to him, and when Tatsuya saved her life, she devoted her entire existence to him. It evolved to the point where she disdains the touch of other males and expresses jealousy of females around Tatsuya.^{LN 11.15} Genetically different from Tatsuya despite being born from the same parents, Miyuki professes her love to him following their engagement under Maya's orders.^{LN 16.6} She is voiced by Saori Hayami (Japanese) and Anairis Quiñones (English).

In polls by Kono Light Novel ga Sugoi!, both Tatsuya and Miyuki ranked as one of the most popular light novel characters. Outside of the franchise, Tatsuya and Miyuki also appear in the video game Dengeki Bunko: Fighting Climax.

=== Supporting ===
==== Tatsuya's group ====
Tatsuya's group consists of seven classmates whom he spends time with in his daily school life. They often assist Tatsuya during investigations and dangerous situations.

- Erika Chiba (Note: 千葉 エリカ, Chiba Erika) is the daughter of the Chiba clan's leader and his mistress, which has created a strained relationship with her family. She has a tomboyish and optimistic personality, and is considered one of the best sword fighters in the clan.^{LN 7.11} Her magic is used to enhance her sword and combat techniques. She considers Mizuki to be her best friend and has a crush on Tatsuya.^{LN 8.10} She is voiced by Yumi Uchiyama (Japanese) and Erica Mendez (English).
- Leonhard Saijo (Note: 西城 レオンハルト, Saijō Reonharuto), commonly referred to as Leo, is the grandson of a Fortress Series modified magician.^{LN 3.4} His grandfather was one of the few survivors of the Fortress Series' instabilities, which causes early death or psychosis. Leo inherited his grandfather's physical augmentations and fears he may also have inherited the Fortress Series' faults.^{LN 3.4} During combat, Leo uses voice-activated magic to fortify objects or his body to augment his combat abilities. He is voiced by Takuma Terashima (Japanese) and Mick Lauer (English).
- Mizuki Shibata (Note: 柴田 美月, Shibata Mizuki) is a girl with a disposition called Crystal Eyes which allows her to see components of magic invisible to most people.^{LN 3.3} Her ability mentally strains her, requiring her to wear glasses to control her vision. She has a timid, calm, and feminine personality. She is voiced by Satomi Sato (Japanese) and Xanthe Huynh (English).
- Mikihiko Yoshida (Note: 吉田 幹比古, Yoshida Mikihiko) is Erika's childhood friend, a prodigy from the Yoshida clan which specializes in magic dealing with spirits. Years prior, Mikihiko failed a summoning ritual, which caused a psychological block and prevented him from using magic effectively. His involvement with Tatsuya restores his confidence, allowing him to regain his magical talents. He is voiced by Atsushi Tamaru (Japanese) and Landon McDonald (English).
- Honoka Mitsui (Note: 光井 ほのか, Mitsui Honoka) is a descendant of a group of extinct magicians referred to as the Elements.^{LN 6.7} The Elements specialized in one of the six elements of magic and had loyalty genetically embedded into their genes. Honoka uses light magic, and her genetic loyalty is directed towards Tatsuya. She is voiced by Sora Amamiya (Japanese) and Kimberly Woods (English).
- Shizuku Kitayama (Note: 北山 雫, Kitayama Shizuku) is Honoka's best friend and daughter to an extremely wealthy man.^{LN 4.1} Shizuku is a mature and tactful girl who rarely shows emotion. She inherited her mother's talent for oscillation magic. She is voiced by Yuiko Tatsumi (Japanese) and Ryan Bartley (English).
- Minami Sakurai (Note: 桜井 水波, Sakurai Minami) is the niece of Honami Sakurai, Miya Yotsuba's guardian.^{LN 12.1} Both Minami and Honami were artificially created by the Yotsuba to serve the clan as bodyguards, and they specialize in barrier type magic. Minami is Miyuki's junior and serves as her maid and second bodyguard.^{LN 12.1} She is voiced by Kiyono Yasuno (Japanese) and Emi Lo (English).

==== Student Council and Disciplinary Committee ====
The student council is a group of students which provides a liaison between the teachers and students. Meanwhile, the Disciplinary Committee consists of students who are essentially rule enforcers. A third committee is the Extracurricular Activities Federation who ensures that school clubs don't come into conflict with each other. The three committees are closely related and work together to preserve the peace on campus.

Mayumi Saegusa (Note: 七草 真由美, Saegusa Mayumi) is the student council president during the Shiba siblings' first year at school.^{LN 1.2} She puts on a coy and innocent facade but is actually mischievous and highly perceptive. Mayumi is talented as a sniper and her form of offensive magic involves firing dry ice as projectiles.^{LN 3.5} During the course of the story, she manipulates Miyuki into joining the student council and Tatsuya into the Disciplinary Committee. She develops an attraction to Tatsuya and places him in awkward situations for fun. After enrolling into Magic University, her twin sisters, Kasumi and Izumi Saegusa, enroll into First High.^{LN 12.6} Mayumi is voiced by Kana Hanazawa (Japanese). and Maureen Price (English).

Two people work alongside Mayumi during the year. The first is Mari Watanabe (Note: 渡辺 摩利, Watanabe Mari) who is the leader of the Disciplinary Committee.^{LN 1.2} Mari has a tomboyish personality but becomes completely feminine in front of her boyfriend, Naotsugu Chiba (Note: 千葉 修次, Chiba Naotsugu), who is also Erika's next oldest half brother.^{LN 4.10} For combat, she uses a whip-like blade and magically manipulates chemicals.^{LN 6.6} The second is Katsuto Jumonji (Note: 十文字 克人, Jūmonji Katsuto), the leader of the Extracurricular Activities Federation.^{LN 2.6} Katsuto is the next head of the Jumonji clan and inherited the clan's barrier magic, Phalanx: an impenetrable and perpetual barrier used for defensive and offensive purposes.^{LN 4.12} Both the Saegusa and Jumonji are members of the Ten Master Clans, forcing Mayumi and Katsuto to be politically involved with the magic community outside of school. Mari is voiced by Marina Inoue (Japanese) and Amber Lee Connors (English), Naotsugu is voiced by Susumu Chiba (Japanese) and Howard Wang (English), and Katsuto is voiced by Junichi Suwabe (Japanese) and Kaiji Tang (English).

During the Shiba siblings' second year, Mayumi is succeeded as student council president by Azusa Nakajou (Note: 中条 あずさ, Nakajō Azusa), a timid and youthful-looking girl.^{LN 5.6} Azusa has an interest in magic engineering and suspects Tatsuya is secretly Taurus Silver. She is able to use a unique magic named after her, Azusa Dream, to forcefully pacify people.^{LN 7.10} Mari is succeeded as chairman of the Disciplinary Committee by Kanon Chiyoda (Note: 千代田 花音, Chiyoda Kanon), an impulsive and good-natured girl.^{LN 6.1} She is engaged to Kei Isori (Note: 五十里 啓, Isori Kei), an androgynous and timid boy, and loves him dearly.^{LN 3.4} Azusa Nakajou is voiced by Saki Ogasawara (Japanese) and Michelle Marie (English), Kanon Chiyoda is voiced by Saori Onishi (Japanese) and Vivian Lu (English), and Kei Isori is voiced by Sōma Saitō (Japanese).

=== Others ===
- Masaki Ichijo (Note: 一条 将輝, Ichijō Masaki) is a first-year student from Third High School and the successor to the head of the Ichijo clan, one of the Ten Master Clans.^{LN 3.4} His combat magic includes manipulating air and water molecules, and his unique magic allows him to evaporate water within an organism, causing it to explode. He became known as the "Crimson Prince" after the New Soviet Union invaded Sado Island in 2093; at age 13, Ichijo volunteered to help repel the invaders and it is rumored that he devastated an entire regiment of regular soldiers by himself. He is often accompanied by his best friend, Shinkuro Kichijoji (Note: 吉祥寺 真紅郎, Kichijōji Shinkurō), who is credited as having discovered one of the sixteen codes fundamental to magic.^{LN 3.4} Shinkuro feels indebted to the Ichijo family for adopting him after his parents were killed in the Sado Island invasion and promises to serve them forever. His code name is "Cardinal George". After losing the nine-school competition, they both seek to improve themselves to overcome Tatsuya.^{LN 5.4} Masaki is voiced by Yoshitsugu Matsuoka while Shinkuro is voiced by Ayumu Murase (Japanese).
- Haruka Ono (Note: 小野 遥, Ono Haruka) is an undercover agent for the Ministry of Public Safety who infiltrates the school as a counselor.^{LN 3.1} She takes both of her duties seriously and frequently assists Tatsuya in gathering information. In addition, Haruka's disposition enhances her innate concealment magic; she trains under Yakumo Kokonoe to further enhance her hiding abilities. Her code name is "Ms. Phantom".^{LN 3.1} She is voiced by Sakura Tange (Japanese).
- Yakumo Kokonoe (Note: 九重 八雲, Kokonoe Yakumo) is a master of ninjutsu, a less common and older form of magic.^{LN 1.2} He chooses to isolate himself from magician politics and spends most of his time gathering information and training his disciples. Tatsuya gets his martial arts combat training from him. Miyuki also gets some martial arts training from him. He is voiced by Ryōtarō Okiayu (Japanese).
- Pixie (Note: ピクシー, Pikushī) is a Home Automation Robot, an android designed to serve humans. She was created and owned by First High's robotics club. During the Visitor Arc, she is used as a physical vessel by one of a group of ethereal supernatural sentient entities referred to as parasites.^{LN 6.7} The parasite began identifying itself as Pixie, and due to Honoka's presence, has developed feelings of love towards Tatsuya. Tatsuya buys her to prevent the magic community from militarizing the parasite inside her.^{LN 6.8} She is voiced by Nao Tōyama (Japanese).
- Zhou Gongjin (Note: 周 公瑾, Shū Kōkin) is a middle-man who orchestrated all major conflicts in the series. He is part of an unknown organization led by Jiedo Heigu (Note: ジード・ヘイグ, Jīdo Heigu) who wishes to destroy the Yotsuba. Zhou is voiced by Kōji Yusa (Japanese).
- Angelina Kudo Shields (Note: アンジェリーナ・クドウ・シールズ, Anjerīna Kudou Shīruzu), commonly referred to as Lina, is the leader of the USNA's magician army force known as Stars.^{LN 7.1} Her military identity is Angie Sirius, and she is one of the thirteen publicly declared strategic magicians. Her maternal grandfather is Retsu Kudô's younger brother. She is voiced by Yōko Hikasa (Japanese) and Suzie Yeung (English).
- Retsu Kudô (Note: 九島 烈, Kudô Retsu) is the Patriarch of the Ten Master Clans and the head of the Nine Schools Competition Committee. He has spoken about being in WWIII in which he rose to the rank of Major General. He knows Tatsuya's commanding officer, Major Kazama whose adjutant, Kyoko Fujibayashi (code name "Electron Sorceress"), is his granddaughter. He also knows the real story of the Shiba siblings, since Maya and Miya Yotsuba were his students. He has expressed concern that the Yotsuba family is getting too powerful. He is voiced by Motomu Kiyokawa (seasons 1–2) and Hōchū Ōtsuka (season 3 onwards) (Japanese).

== Production ==
=== Conception ===
The story was conceived around a protagonist whose abilities cannot be properly measured through standardized evaluation;^{LN 2.A} as such, he is mistakenly categorized as a poor performing student or an irregular. This premise served as a basis for the character Tatsuya Shiba.^{LN 2.A} Satō has two processes for scripting the story arcs: the first is to create scenarios to have characters behave and interact in certain ways; the second is to plan a scene, then script the story so it leads to that scene.^{LN 11.A} Satō professed that he does not feel his characters are alive or have a will of their own when scripting them.^{LN 11.A}

== Light novels ==
Tsutomu Satō published his work on the web novel website Shōsetsuka ni Narō between October 12, 2008, and March 21, 2011. At some point during his publication on Syosetu, Satō sent an original work to Dengeki Bunko under a pseudonym.^{LN 1.A} The original work's setting shared similarities to The Irregular at Magic High School, causing an editor to deduce his identity and offer him a publication deal.^{LN 1.A} On March 11, 2011, the author announced his work would be published as a light novel under the Dengeki Bunko imprint. The author expressed regret commercializing free content and cited financial needs as the reason.^{LN 1.A}

The illustrations accompanying the light novels were done by Kana Ishida. The first light novel volume was unable to accommodate the first story arc; Satō decided against cutting content from the web novel, and it was split into two volumes and released a month later.^{LN 2.A}

On March 9, 2015, Yen Press announced its licensing of the light novels for English localization. Yen Press' first volume was released in April 2016.

In June 2020, it was announced that the novel series would be ending with its 32nd volume which was released on September 10, 2020.

In July 2020, both a direct book sequel and a new spinoff series were announced. The sequel, titled The Irregular At Magic High School Magian Company (続・魔法科高校の劣等生 メイジアン・カンパニー, Zoku Mahōka Kōkō no Rettōsei Majian Kanpanī) began publication on October 10, 2020. The spinoff, New – The Irregular at Magic High School Maidens of Cygnus (新・魔法科高校の劣等生 キグナスの乙女たち, Mahōka Kōkō no Rettōsei Kigunasu no Otome-tachi) began publication on January 9, 2021. A manga adaptation of Maidens of Cygnus began serialization in Media Factory´s Comic Alive in March 2021 with art by La-na.

=== The Irregular at Magic High School ===
No.	Title	Original release date	English release date
1	Enrollment Arc (I); Nyūgaku-hen (Jō) (入学編 〈上〉)	July 10, 2011; 978-4-04-870597-4	April 19, 2016; 978-0-316-34880-5
April 2095, the siblings, Tatsuya and Miyuki Shiba begin their first day at First High School, one of the nine magic high schools in Japan; the school segregates its students as first course or second course based on overall magic ability. Miyuki is considered a prodigy within first course, and is recruited as a member of the Student Council, while Tatsuya faces scorn and prejudice alongside his peers in the second course. A scuffle caused by a first course student reveals Tatsuya's ability to predict magic before it is cast, causing him to be recruited by the Disciplinary Committee through Miyuki's endorsement; in order to defend Miyuki's honor, Tatsuya displays his combat abilities to the Student Council, proving his competency as an enforcer. Shortly after, Tatsuya intervenes in a scuffle between the kendo and kenjutsu clubs and overwhelms the latter with his physical abilities.
2	Enrollment Arc (II); Nyūgaku-hen (Ge) (入学編 〈下〉)	August 10, 2011; 978-4-04-870598-1	August 23, 2016; 978-0-316-39029-3
Tatsuya garners the attention of an anti-magician organization called Blanche, who send a classmate named Sayaka Mibu to recruit him. After Tatsuya declines her invitation, Blanche invades First High to steal its research. Tatsuya and friends foil their attempt and attacks their headquarters in return. Learning that the head of Blanche used mind controlling magic on Sayaka and other student collaborators, Tatsuya was able to establish their innocence, absolving them of any crime.
3	Nine School Competition Arc (I); Kyūkōsen-hen (Jō) (九校戦編〈上〉)	November 10, 2011; 978-4-04-870998-9	December 20, 2016; 978-0-316-39030-9
July 2095, the Nine School Competition is Japan's national sporting event which pits the nine magic schools against each other. Miyuki is elected as a contestant while Tatsuya reluctantly joins the team as an engineer. During the competition, an international criminal syndicate named No Head Dragon makes several attempts to rig the contest by sabotaging First High, which eventually injures their teammate, Mari Watanabe. With Miyuki forced to substitute for her, Tatsuya enlists the help of his friends to assist in his investigation before Miyuki becomes a target of sabotage.
4	Nine School Competition Arc (II); Kyūkōsen-hen (Ge) (九校戦編〈下〉)	December 10, 2011; 978-4-04-870999-6	April 18, 2017; 978-0-316-39031-6
It is revealed No Head Dragon has placed bets on the competition and require First High to lose. Tatsuya, Leonhard Saijo, and Mikihiko Yoshida are substituted in as players after No Head Dragon injures the original First High team for the Monolith Code competition, and under Tatsuya's leadership they are able to win first place. After catching a member of No Head Dragon attempting to sabotage Miyuki's equipment, Tatsuya retaliates by killing every member of the organization based within Japan. The competition concludes with First High achieving first place overall.
5	Summer Vacation Arc +1; Natsuyasumi-hen +1 (夏休み編+1)	April 10, 2012; 978-4-04-886522-7	August 22, 2017; 978-0-316-39032-3
July 2095, several characters' summer vacations are highlighted. Most notably: Tatsuya and friends spend the day at Shizuku Kitayama's private resort; Masaki Ichijo and Shinkuro Kichijoji reflect on their defeat by Tatsuya; and Tatsuya recalls shopping with Miyuki at the mall. Afterwards, First High clubs begin planning their officer successions and Tatsuya is asked to convince Azusa Nakajou to become the next Student Council president.
6	Yokohama Disturbance Arc (I); Yokohama Sōran-hen (Jō) (横浜騒乱編<上>)	July 10, 2012; 978-4-04-886700-9	December 19, 2017; 978-0-316-39033-0
October 2095, Tatsuya is asked to partake in the school's thesis competition. At the same time, his step-mother places an OOPart capable of storing magic into his care. Chen Xiangshan, a military captain from the Great Asian Alliance, leads a team in order to steal the OOPart. During the course of the novel, two First High students affiliated with Chen are detained by authorities after they were caught stealing information from First High's thesis project.
7	Yokohama Disturbance Arc (II); Yokohama Sōran-hen (Ge) (横浜騒乱編<下>)	September 10, 2012; 978-4-04-886701-6	March 27, 2018; 978-1-9753-0007-4
The thesis competition begins in Yokohama where an army led by Chen initiates their attack. During the battle, Tatsuya's power and military status is revealed to his close peers; the battle concludes with Tatsuya using matter detonation, a strategic level magic, to destroy the invading naval ship and subsequently an entire Great Asian Alliance harbor.
8	Reminiscence Arc; Tsuioku-hen (追憶編)	December 10, 2012; 978-4-04-891158-0	June 26, 2018; 978-1-9753-2712-5
November 2095 & August 2092, Maya Yotsuba summons Tatsuya and Miyuki to discuss recent events. Miyuki reminisces how she and Tatsuya reached their current status quo. Three years ago, Tatsuya, Miyuki, their mother Miya, and a bodyguard named Hoonami Sakurai were vacationing in Okinawa. There, Miyuki warms up to Tatsuya, and Tatsuya develops a friendship with then Captain Kazama Harunobu. During that time, an invasion by the Great Asian Alliance results in Hoonami's death, and is resolved with Tatsuya's matter detonation. Back in the present, Maya warns Tatsuya that his matter detonation has garnered the attention of the United States of North America (USNA).
9	Visitor Arc (I); Raihōsha-hen (Jō) (来訪者編＜上＞)	March 10, 2013; 978-4-04-891423-9	September 18, 2018; 978-1-9753-2714-9
December 2095, following a black hole experiment in the USNA, deserters from the military flee to Japan. The Stars military unit pursue in order to execute the deserters and investigate the magician behind matter detonation. Angelina Kudo Shields infiltrates First High to spy on Tatsuya and Miyuki. As the story progresses, the deserters' abnormal abilities and activities garner the interest of Japan's magic clans. After confronting Angelina and one of the deserters, Tatsuya trades his silence for her information.
10	Visitor Arc (II); Raihōsha-hen (Chū) (来訪者編＜中＞)	June 7, 2013; 978-4-04-891609-7	December 18, 2018; 978-1-9753-2716-3
Tatsuya deduces the deserters are possessed by sentient psychic energy beings which came from the magic dimension during the black hole experiment and are dubbed as parasites. When one of the parasites enters First High, it is defeated by Tatsuya's group and possess the android known as Pixy; the parasite is imprinted with Honoka's feelings and decides to serve Tatsuya. Meanwhile, the USNA suspect Tatsuya is the one behind matter detonation and orders Angelina to assassinate him.
11	Visitor Arc (III); Raihōsha-hen (Ge) (来訪者編＜下＞)	August 10, 2013; 978-4-04-891610-3	March 19, 2019; 978-1-9753-2718-7
Tatsuya defeats Angelina while the Yotsuba clan forces Stars to stand down. Knowing that the eleven other parasites will attempt to retrieve Pixy, Tatsuya's group uses her as bait. Several magic clans attempt to capture the parasites resulting in a large-scale battle. This concludes with Tatsuya and Miyuki destroying nine of the parasites, leaving the remaining two in the custody of the Kudo and Yotsuba clan. As Tatsuya and Miyuki enter their second year, Maya has Minami Sakurai assigned to be Miyuki's bodyguard.
12	Double Seven Arc; Daburu Sebun-hen (ダブルセブン編)	October 10, 2013; 978-4-04-866003-7	June 18, 2019; 978-1-9753-2720-0
April 2096, Tatsuya and Miyuki's second year begins. A student named Takumi Shippou holds a displaced grudge towards the Saegusa twins, Kasumi and Izumi, causing conflict throughout the novel. Eventually, Takumi's arrogance is quelled by Tatsuya and friends. Meanwhile, Zhou Gongjin and the Saegusa clan cooperate to have the media denounce the magicians of Japan by scapegoating First High, but backfires when Tatsuya learns of their plans and demonstrates the concepts of a magician operated power source. By coincidence, Tatsuya also foils an attack on a famous actress while dealing with Takumi.
13	Steeplechase Arc; Sutīpuruchēsu-hen (スティープルチェース編)	April 10, 2014; 978-4-04-866507-0	October 15, 2019; 978-1-9753-3246-4
July 2096, the Kudo clan have managed to create androids powered by parasites. In order to test these weapons, they decided to place these androids as obstacles in the Steeplechase event of the Nine Schools Competition. Aware of the dangers these weapons would pose to Miyuki, Tatsuya infiltrates and neutralizes the androids before the other players arrive. Behind the scenes, Zhou attempts to sabotage the parasites to discredit magicians as a way to denounce the Yotsuba; fed up with his actions, the Yotsuba begin their manhunt for him.
14	Ancient City Insurrection Arc (I); Koto Nairan-hen (Jō) (古都内乱編＜上＞)	September 10, 2014; 978-4-04-866860-6	December 31, 2019; 978-1-9753-3247-1
September 2096, Tatsuya is "requested" to participate in the hunt for Zhou by his aunt Maya Yotsuba. Several clues reveal Zhou is hidden by the traditionalist magicians. Tatsuya requests aid from the Kudo clan who are knowledgeable about the traditionalist. Led by Minoru Kudo, Tatsuya's group confronts the traditionalists in Nara but are unable to find Zhou, leaving Kyoto as the remaining location. Meanwhile, the Saegusa head sends an assassin to kill Zhou in order to destroy any evidence of their coalition. The assassin is killed instead, spurring Mayumi to request Tatsuya's aid in finding his killer.
15	Ancient City Insurrection Arc (II); Koto Nairan-hen (Ge) (古都内乱編＜下＞)	January 10, 2015; 978-4-04-869167-3	April 7, 2020; 978-1-9753-3249-5
Tatsuya and his companions investigate Zhou's whereabouts in Kyoto and eventually catch and corner him. Zhou then commits suicide, proclaiming someone else will resume his duties. Tatsuya's success forces members of the Yotsuba who despise him to allow Maya to proceed with her plans.
16	Yotsuba Succession Arc; Yotsuba Keishō-hen (四葉継承編)	May 9, 2015; 978-4-04-865116-5	April 27, 2021; 978-1-9753-3251-8
December 2096, Miyuki is summoned to the Yotsuba New Years meeting to commemorate her as the next head of the clan. Several bunke members of the clan attempt to derail Miyuki's attendance as her succession will elevate Tatsuya's status. Upon their arrival, Miyuki is appointed as the next head, and the origins of Tatsuya and Miyuki's birth is revealed. While they are born from the same gametes, Miyuki was genetically modified to act as a seal to his powers. In the next meeting, Maya announces Tatsuya's engagement to Miyuki.
17	Master Clans Council Arc (I); Shizoku Kaigi-hen (Jō) (師族会議編＜上＞)	August 8, 2015; 978-4-04-865313-8	September 14, 2021; 978-1-9753-3253-2
January 2097, Tatsuya and Miyuki adjust to their daily life as their ties to the Yotsuba and engagement have become public knowledge. Meanwhile, a meeting between the master clans take place where they discuss three topics: possible members of the master clan, Tatsuya and Miyuki's marriage, and Saegusa's coalition with the deceased Zhou. Jiedo Heigu, the leader of the organized crime group and Zhou's boss, initiates several bombings against the master clans in order to discredit the magic community.
18	Master Clans Council Arc (II); Shizoku Kaigi-hen (Chū) (師族会議編＜中＞)	November 10, 2015; 978-4-04-865512-5	January 18, 2022; 978-1-9753-3255-6
Jiedo's plan succeeds, inciting several hate crimes towards magicians throughout the world. The master clans makes plans to quell public outrage as well as attempts to capture Jiedo. The volume ends with Miyuki and her friends defending themselves against a group of anti-magicians.
19	Master Clans Council Arc (III); Shizoku Kaigi-hen (Ge) (師族会議編＜下＞)	March 10, 2016; 978-4-04-865809-6	May 31, 2022; 978-1-9753-4383-5
Tatsuya arrives and neutralizes the anti-magician group. With Miyuki by his side, Tatsuya uses his full powers to search for Jiedo and relay the location to the Yotsuba. The master clans then assemble a unit to capture Jiedo, who is instead killed by the USNA during the mission.
20	South Sea Riot Arc; Nankai Sōjō-hen (南海騒擾編)	September 10, 2016; 978-4-04-892318-7	October 18, 2022; 978-1-9753-4516-7
March 2097, Japan has recently completed an artificial island in Okinawa to mine resources from the ocean. In response, a rebellion cell from the Great Asian Alliance and the Australian military work together to destroy the island in order to keep the world's power in check. The Yotsuba send Tatsuya to pacify the saboteurs and to protect the island. At the same time, the senior class of First High's graduation party is taking place nearby. As the attack on the island commences, members of First High and Tatsuya quell and capture the rebels.
21	Upheaval Prologue Arc (I); Dōran no Joshō-hen <Jō> (動乱の序章編<上>)	February 10, 2017; 978-4-04-892669-0	January 23, 2024; 978-1-9753-4518-1
Late March 2097, the Brazilian government's utilization of their strategic magician creates chaos and fear to non-magicians throughout the world, causing a political cold war to take place. The New Soviet Union mounts an attack on Japan's navy, forcing Tatsuya to intervene. As tensions between the world's superpowers rise, the USNA and New Soviet Union make plans to neutralize Tatsuya.
22	Upheaval Prologue Arc (II); Dōran no Joshō-hen <Ge> (動乱の序章編<下>)	June 9, 2017; 978-4-04-892949-3	May 21, 2024; 978-1-9753-4521-1
The Tooyama clan, a magician branch loyal to the government, evaluate Tatsuya as a threat. Several black ops led by Tsukasa Tooyama are used to assess Tatsuya's abilities and to determine a countermeasure should he become an enemy of the country. In retaliation, Tatsuya is ordered by Maya to break into the Tooyama stronghold and to free the captured USNA soldiers based within Japan; he succeeds and Tooyama ends her operations, having discovered the Jumonji clan can stop Tatsuya.
23	Isolation Arc; Koritsu-hen (孤立編)	August 10, 2017; 978-4-04-893281-3	September 17, 2024; 978-1-9753-4523-5
24	Escape Arc (I); Esukēpu-hen <Jō> (エスケープ編<上>)	March 10, 2018; 978-4-04-893686-6	January 21, 2025; 978-1-9753-4525-9
25	Escape Arc (II); Esukēpu-hen <Ge> (エスケープ編<下>)	April 10, 2018; 978-4-04-893792-4	July 15, 2025; 979-8-8554-0976-5
26	Invasion Arc; Inbējon-hen (インベージョン編)	August 10, 2018; 978-4-04-893970-6	February 10, 2026; 979-8-8554-0978-9
27	Sudden Change Arc; Kyūten-hen (急転編)	November 10, 2018; 978-4-04-912163-6	September 8, 2026; 979-8-8554-0980-2
28	Pursuit Arc (I); Tsuiseki-hen <Jō> (追跡編＜上＞)	April 10, 2019; 978-4-04-912560-3	February 9, 2027; 979-8-8554-0982-6
29	Pursuit Arc (II); Tsuiseki-hen <Ge> (追跡編＜下＞)	June 8, 2019; 978-4-04-912571-9	—
30	Rescue Chapter; Dakkan-hen (奪還編)	September 10, 2019; 978-4-04-912738-6	—
31	Future Chapter; Mirai-hen (未来編)	April 10, 2020; 978-4-04-913067-6	—
32	Sacrifice/Graduation Chapter; Sakurifaisu-hen/Sotsugyō-hen (サクリファイス編／卒業編)	September 10, 2020; 978-4-04-913253-3	—

==== Side stories ====
No.	Title	Japanese release date	Japanese ISBN
1	The Irregular at Magic High School SS; Mahōka Kōkō no Rettōsei SS (魔法科高校の劣等生SS)	May 10, 2016	978-4-04-865952-9
2	Assassination Plan of Tatsuya Shiba (1); Shiba Tatsuya Ansatsu Keikaku (1) (司波達也暗殺計画(1))	October 10, 2018	978-4-04-912021-9
3	Assassination Plan of Tatsuya Shiba (2); Shiba Tatsuya Ansatsu Keikaku (2) (司波達也暗殺計画(2))	February 9, 2019	978-4-04-912265-7
4	Assassination Plan of Tatsuya Shiba (3); Shiba Tatsuya Ansatsu Keikaku (3) (司波達也暗殺計画(3))	January 10, 2020	978-4-04-913002-7
5	Appendix (1)	June 10, 2022	978-4-04-914334-8
6	Appendix (2)	September 9, 2022	978-4-04-914526-7

=== The Irregular at Magic High School Magian Company ===
No.	Japanese release date	Japanese ISBN
1	October 10, 2020	978-4-04-913254-0
2	April 9, 2021	978-4-04-913623-4
3	November 10, 2021	978-4-04-913931-0
4	May 10, 2022	978-4-04-914339-3
5	November 10, 2022	978-4-04-914527-4
6	May 10, 2023	978-4-04-915009-4
7	December 8, 2023	978-4-04-915113-8
8	May 10, 2024	978-4-04-915648-5
9	December 10, 2024	978-4-04-915977-6
10	June 10, 2025	978-4-04-916399-5
11	March 10, 2026	978-4-04-916586-9
12	September 10, 2026	978-4-04-952410-9

=== The Irregular at Magic High School Maidens of Cygnus ===
No.	Japanese release date	Japanese ISBN
1	January 9, 2021	978-4-04-913262-5
2	July 9, 2021	978-4-04-913728-6
3	February 10, 2022	978-4-04-913932-7
4	August 10, 2022	978-4-04-914340-9
5	February 10, 2023	978-4-04-914528-1
6	February 9, 2024	978-4-04-915114-5
7	March 7, 2025	978-4-04-915978-3

== Media adaptations ==
=== Manga ===
The Irregular at Magic High School was adapted into several manga series with various artists and publishers; each manga adaptation covered a story arc from the original light novels. The first adaptation was by Fumino Hayashi and Tsuna Kitaumi and covered the Enrollment Arc of the light novels.

==== Enrollment Arc ====
No.	Japanese release date	Japanese ISBN
1	September 10, 2012	978-4-7575-3722-4
2	January 26, 2013	978-4-7575-3869-6
3	July 27, 2013	978-4-7575-4019-4
4	December 27, 2013	978-4-7575-4191-7

==== Nine School Competition Arc ====
No.	Japanese release date	Japanese ISBN
1	April 10, 2014	978-4-7575-4272-3
2	September 10, 2014	978-4-7575-4408-6
3	March 27, 2015	978-4-7575-4597-7
4	October 27, 2015	978-4-7575-4785-8
5	July 27, 2016	978-4-7575-5067-4

==== Summer Vacation Arc ====
No.	Japanese release date	Japanese ISBN
1	February 10, 2017	978-4-04-892722-2
2	August 10, 2017	978-4-04-892980-6
3	February 9, 2018	978-4-04-893538-8

==== Presidential Election Arc ====
No.	Japanese release date	Japanese ISBN
1	October 10, 2018	978-4-04-912147-6

==== Yokohama Disturbance Arc ====
No.	Japanese release date	Japanese ISBN
1	April 10, 2014	978-4-7575-4273-0
2	September 10, 2014	978-4-7575-4409-3
3	January 10, 2015	978-4-7575-4532-8
4	June 27, 2015	978-4-7575-4681-3
5	November 27, 2015	978-4-7575-4816-9

==== Reminiscence Arc ====
No.	Japanese release date	Japanese ISBN
1	June 10, 2014	978-4-04-866615-2
2	December 10, 2014	978-4-04-869058-4
3	September 10, 2015	978-4-04-865302-2

==== Visitor Arc ====
No.	Japanese release date	Japanese ISBN
1	July 27, 2016	978-4-7575-5068-1
2	December 27, 2016	978-4-7575-5208-1
3	June 9, 2017	978-4-7575-5367-5
4	March 10, 2018	978-4-7575-5619-5
5	August 10, 2018	978-4-7575-5803-8
6	September 10, 2019	978-4-7575-6279-0
7	September 10, 2019	978-4-7575-6280-6

==== Double Seven Arc ====
No.	Japanese release date	Japanese ISBN
1	September 27, 2017	978-4-7575-5491-7
2	July 27, 2018	978-4-7575-5798-7
3	September 27, 2019	978-4-7575-6323-0

==== Steeplechase Arcs ====
No.	Japanese release date	Japanese ISBN
1	November 9, 2019	978-4-04-912864-2
2	June 10, 2020	978-4-04-913235-9
3	December 10, 2020	978-4-04-913568-8

==== Ancient City Insurrection Arc ====
No.	Japanese release date	Japanese ISBN
1	November 9, 2019	978-4-04-912865-9
2	June 10, 2020	978-4-04-913236-6
3	December 10, 2020	978-4-04-913569-5
4	July 9, 2021	978-4-04-913891-7
5	March 10, 2022	978-4-04-914256-3

==== Yotsuba Succession Arc ====
No.	Japanese release date	Japanese ISBN
1	September 10, 2020	978-4-7575-6840-2
2	June 25, 2021	978-4-7575-7339-0
3	May 27, 2022	978-4-7575-7936-1

==== Master Clans Council Arc ====
No.	Japanese release date	Japanese ISBN
1	September 10, 2020	978-4-7575-6839-6
2	December 26, 2020	978-4-7575-7017-7
3	June 25, 2021	978-4-7575-7338-3
4	December 27, 2021	978-4-7575-7655-1
5	June 27, 2022	978-4-7575-7993-4
6	March 27, 2023	978-4-7575-8491-4
7	September 27, 2023	978-4-7575-8815-8
8	March 27, 2024	978-4-7575-9127-1
9	November 27, 2024	978-4-7575-9536-1

==== South Sea Riot Arc ====
No.	Japanese release date	Japanese ISBN
1	September 10, 2021	978-4-04-913991-4
2	March 10, 2022	978-4-04-913991-4
3	October 7, 2022	978-4-04-914654-7

==== Upheaval Prologue Arc ====
No.	Japanese release date	Japanese ISBN
1	August 10, 2023	978-4-04-915187-9
2	February 9, 2024	978-4-04-915501-3
3	October 25, 2024	978-4-04-915972-1
4	March 10, 2025	978-4-04-916256-1
5	September 27, 2025	978-4-04-916620-0
6	May 27, 2026	978-4-04-952250-1

==== Isolation Arc ====
No.	Japanese release date	Japanese ISBN
1	November 27, 2023	978-4-7575-8922-3
2	September 27, 2024	978-4-7575-9445-6
3	September 27, 2025	978-4-301-00077-8

==== Escape Arc ====
No.	Japanese release date	Japanese ISBN
1	March 25, 2023	978-4-04-914963-0
2	March 25, 2023	978-4-04-915502-0
3	October 25, 2024	978-4-04-915973-8
4	September 27, 2025	978-4-04-916621-7
5	May 27, 2026	978-4-04-952251-8

==== Invasion Arc ====
No.	Japanese release date	Japanese ISBN
1	November 27, 2025	978-4-301-00198-0
2	March 26, 2026	978-4-301-00420-2
3	October 27, 2026	978-4-301-00839-2
4	October 27, 2026	978-4-301-00840-8

==== Sudden Change Arc ====
No.	Japanese release date	Japanese ISBN
1	July 27, 2026	978-4-301-00663-3

==== The Honor Student at Magic High School ====
A spin-off manga titled The Honor Student at Magic High School (魔法科高校の優等生, Mahōka Kōkō no Yūtōsei) by Yu Mori premiered in Dengeki Daioh's June 2012 issue. It was collected in eleven tankōbon volumes under the Dengeki Comics Next imprint. Yen Press licensed the series' tankōbon volumes for a North American release, and released the first volume in November 2015.

===== Volumes =====
No.	Original release date	Original ISBN	English release date	English ISBN
1	June 7, 2013	978-4-04-891781-0	November 17, 2015	978-0-316-35141-6
2	July 10, 2013	978-4-04-891782-7	March 22, 2016	978-0-316-39034-7
3	February 8, 2014	978-4-04-866303-8	June 28, 2016	978-0-316-39035-4
4	September 27, 2014	978-4-04-866916-0	September 27, 2016	978-0-316-31760-3
5	March 10, 2015	978-4-04-869309-7	December 20, 2016	978-0-316-39914-2
6	December 10, 2015	978-4-04-865706-8	March 21, 2017	978-0-316-46604-2
7	August 10, 2016	978-4-04-892176-3	June 20, 2017	978-0-316-47184-8
8	June 9, 2017	978-4-04-892909-7	April 24, 2018	978-1-9753-0015-9
9	April 9, 2018	978-4-04-893646-0	November 11, 2018	978-1-9753-2938-9
10	March 27, 2019	978-4-04-912417-0	November 11, 2019	978-1-9753-5957-7
11	September 10, 2020	978-4-04-913429-2	June 29, 2021	978-1-9753-2526-8

=== Anime ===
An anime adaptation of the light novel was announced during the Dengeki Bunko Fall Festival on October 6, 2013. It is directed by Manabu Ono and animated by Madhouse. It aired on Tokyo MX, GTV, and GYT from April 6 to September 28, 2014; nine other networks and three streaming services broadcast the series afterwards. The individual episodes were later encapsulated into ten DVD and Blu-ray volumes released between July 2014 and April 2015. LiSA sang the first opening theme titled "Rising Hope".

In March 2014, Aniplex of America announced its acquisition for streaming rights to the anime series; later, they unveiled their plans to release the series into three Blu-ray volumes which segregate the episodes by story arcs. Four networks simulcasted the series with English subtitles: these were Aniplex Channel, Crunchyroll, Hulu, and Daisuki. In June 2014, the Australasia distributor, Hanabee Entertainment, announced its licensing of the series for streaming and home media release. Months later, Netflix made the series available on their network. Animax Asia also began broadcasting the series in July 2015. - Three related media to the anime were created. The first is a chibi short series titled Get to Know Magic Studies! (Note: よくわかる魔法科!, Yoku Wakaru Mahōka!) by Aniplex. These shorts were uploaded on Aniplex's YouTube channel, and later subtitled in English and uploaded on Aniplex of America's channel. The second is an internet radio show titled The Irregular at Magic High School Web Radio Full Bloom! Bloom Broadcasting Committee (Note: 魔法科高校の劣等生Webラジオ 満開!ブルーム放送委員会, Mahōka Kōkō no Rettōsei Web Rajio Mankai! Burūmu Hōsō Iinkai), which premiered on March 23, 2014, and is hosted by Sora Amamiya and Yuiko Tatsumi, the voice actresses for Honoka Mitsui and Shizuku Kitayama respectively; the radio show episodes were later made available for purchase on CD. The third is a radio drama DVD which released in December 2014 and is based on the light novel's Recollection Arc.

An anime film titled The Irregular at Magic High School: The Movie – The Girl Who Summons the Stars (Note: 劇場版 魔法科高校の劣等生 星を呼ぶ少女, Gekijōban Mahōka Kōkō no Rettōsei: Hoshi o Yobu Shōjo) was revealed in the 19th light novel volume, which was released in March 2016. The film is based on an original new story written by the series creator, Tsutomu Satō, and premiered in Japan on June 17, 2017. It is directed by Risako Yoshida and animated by Eight Bit. The rest of the staff and cast will reprise their roles in the film. In the United States, Aniplex of America released the film in theaters and on home video. The film takes place after the events of the eleventh volume of the light novel or during the commercial break of the eleventh episode of the series' second season.

At the "Dengeki Bunko Aki no Namahōsō Festival" event on October 6, 2019, a second season of the anime series adapting the "Visitor Arc" in the novel series was announced and originally scheduled to air in July 2020, but it aired from October 4 to December 27, 2020, due to the COVID-19 pandemic. The main staff and cast from the 2017 film reprise their roles in the second season. ASCA performed the opening theme song "Howling", while Miki Satō performed the ending theme song "Na mo Nai Hana". Aniplex of America announced its acquisition of the anime series, and originally announced that Funimation would stream it exclusively, but Hulu ended up streaming the series as well. On November 13, 2020, Funimation announced that the second season of the series would receive an English dub.

After the end of the series, it was revealed that the spin-off manga series, The Honor Student at Magic High School would get an anime television series adaptation, which aired from July 3 to September 25, 2021, on Tokyo MX and other channels. The series is animated by Connect and directed by Hideki Tachibana, with Tsuyoshi Tamai writing and overseeing the series' scripts, Ryōsuke Yamamoto and Takao Sano designing the characters, and Taku Iwasaki returning to compose the series' music. The opening theme is "101" performed by Sangatsu no Phantasia while the ending theme is "Double Standard" performed by The Dance for Philosophy.

On February 28, 2021, an anime adaptation of the "Reminiscence Arc" was announced. It was later revealed to be a 60-minute television film, with the main cast and staff of the second season reprising their roles. It aired on December 31, 2021. The theme song is "Ripe Aster" by Kairi Yagi.

A sequel to the anime series was announced in January 2022. In July 2023, the sequel was confirmed to be a new television series directed by Jimmy Stone at Eight Bit. The opening theme is "Shouted Serenade" by LiSA and the ending theme is "recall" by Kairi Yagi. It premiered on April 5, 2024.

After the final episode of the third season aired, an anime film adaptation of the "Yotsuba Succession Arc" was announced. Directed by Jimmy Stone at Eight Bit, it opened in Japanese theaters on May 8, 2026, distributed by Animec. The film was released in North America by Crunchyroll via Sony Pictures for three days only during November of 2026 with an English dub.

A second part of the anime series was announced on June 5, 2026.

=== Video games ===
Three video game adaptations have been made for the franchise. The first is The Irregular at Magic High School: Out of Order by Bandai Namco Games. It is a 3D fighting game for the PlayStation Vita and was released on December 25, 2014. The second game is The Irregular at Magic High School: School Magicus Battle (Note: スクールマギクスバトル, Sukūru Magikusu Batoru), a Japanese role-playing game by Mobage. It was made available for Android, iOS, and feature phone on June 9, 2014. The third game is The Irregular at Magic High School: Lost Zero, developed by BeXide and published by Square Enix. It was made available for Android and iOS on September 4, 2014.

== Reception ==
=== Light novels ===
The light novels have been well received. They were ranked seventh in Sugoi Japan 2015 polls and have been one of the top selling light novel series in Japan. By 2014, 5.3 million copies of the light novel had been sold. In addition, its manga and anime adaptations also appeared on top selling charts. In 2017, 7.7 million copies had been sold. By 2020, the series had sold more than 20 million copies. By December 2021, sale numbers exceeded 22 million copies.

=== Anime ===
Anime News Network had four editors review the first episode of the anime. Carl Kimlinger stated that it "handles its generic content quite well", praising Tatsuya's character as well as the execution of the plot. He concluded that overall, it was "attractive, intelligent, and put-together", and gave it a 3.5/5 rating. Theron Martin was less enthusiastic; he called the show "eminently skippable" with a 2/5 score, expressing criticism towards the constant exposition and lack of focus on the plot. Rebecca Silverman was even more critical with a 1/5 rating, stating that it "irritated me to an irrational level" for its plot points, while also disliking its pacing, animation, and character relationships. The fourth reviewer, Hope Chapman, also gave it a 1/5 rating, criticizing it for lacking anything to engage the viewers. He lambasted the series' plot, calling it "unoriginal and unintelligible", concluding that there was not "a single redeeming factor or thing to recommend about it".

Silverman reviewed the series' future episodes. She improved her assessment from the premiere, stating that it was "not a series best judged by its initial episode alone", and gave the Enrollment Arc a "B" rating and the Nine Schools Competition Arc a "C" rating. Regarding the Enrollment Arc, she praised its "themes of discrimination and self-worth", although she felt Tatsuya was unlikable as a protagonist. She was more critical of the Nine Schools Competition Arc, calling it "one of the least tense and exciting tournaments I've ever seen". She disliked the pacing, which "lack[ed] any real sense of urgency", and felt that the plot was "buried" under unrelated side stories. Overall, Silverman felt the series did not live up to its potential.

Chris Beveridge's review for The Fandom Post gave a positive review for the first Blu-ray release of the anime series, calling its structure "appealing" and its characters having "really good potential". He praised the series' technical aspects of magic for breaking the typical supernatural approach of other works. Reviewing the second Blu-ray release, he noted these technical aspects would also frustrate certain viewers despite his personal enjoyment of the magic system. Nevertheless, he concluded by calling the show a "dark horse contender" for his favorite series of the year, naming its characters and worldbuilding as particular strong points.

Richard Eisenbeis, writing for Kotaku, gave a generally negative review. Although he liked the characters and plot, calling them "pretty darn enjoyable", he was highly critical of the magic system, which he felt was "made up on the fly", as well as the exposition, which he criticized for being unclear and confusing. He ended his review by noting the anime's potential if a different director or screenwriter had been hired.

== Notes ==
=== Regarding works cited ===
- ^LN represents the Light Novel of the series in the format of X.Y, where X represents the volume and Y represents the chapter. Chapter A represents the afterword of the novel.
