= Hideki Tachibana =

Japanese writer and director of anime

Hideki Tachibana (橘 秀樹, Tachibana Hideki) is a Japanese writer and anime director.

== Works ==
=== TV series ===
- Bleach memories of nobody (2006) (Chief director and continuity)
- H2O: Footprints in the Sand (2008) (director)
- Dragon Crisis! (2011) (director)
- BlazBlue Alter Memory (2013) (director)
- Chaos Dragon (2015) (chief director)
- Armed Girl's Machiavellism (2017) (director)
- Circlet Princess (2019) (director)
- Is It Wrong to Try to Pick Up Girls in a Dungeon? (2019–2024) (director)
- The Honor Student at Magic High School (2021) (director)
- The Many Sides of Voice Actor Radio (2024) (director)
- I Made Friends with the Second Prettiest Girl in My Class (2026) (director)

=== Original video animation ===
- Higurashi no Naku Koro ni: Kira (2011–2012) (director)
- Alice in Borderland (2014–2015) (director)
- Armed Girl's Machiavellism (2017) (director)
