= Tetsuharu Ōta =

Japanese voice actor

- 太田 哲治
- Born: May 30, 1980 (age 46); Chiba Prefecture, Japan
- Occupation: voice actor
- Years active: 2003–present
- Agent: 81 Produce

Tetsuharu Ōta (太田 哲治, Ōta Tetsuharu; born May 30, 1980) is a Japanese voice actor from Chiba Prefecture, Japan. He is member of 81 Produce.

== Filmography ==
=== Anime ===
2004

- Grandpa Danger (Gebe, Step Hasegawa)
- Wagamama Fairy: Mirumo de Pon! (Yusuke Natsu, Koichi Sumita, Shirō (season 4))

2005

- Glass Mask (Itō, Matsumoto)
- Hamtaro (Lion)
- Hell Girl (Sasaki)
- MÄR (Kollekio)
- Starship Operators (Iriki Kanno)
- Zoids Genesis (Gotoshi)

2006

- Digimon Data Squad (Blossomon)
- Gin Tama (Sagaru Yamazaki, Saotome, Ōnishi, Wakane)
- Kirarin Revolution (Tomo Kamata)
- Major (Yūichi Izumi, Noguchi)
- Night Head Genesis (Yosuke Tsuzuki)
- Utawarerumono (Chikinaro, Tamua)
- Wan Wan Celeb Soreyuke! Tetsunoshin (Gary Kamata, Kaiser, Rashid)
- Zenmai Zamurai (Torajiro)

2007

- Baccano! (Jon Parnell, Vicky)
- Deltora Quest (Fair, Zhang)
- Gurren Lagann (Jamoroku)
- Nagasarete Airantō (Etekichi, Fukurō, Kara-age, Pandaro)
- Potemayo (Hajime Kaji)
- Princess Resurrection (Kuroda)
- Shining Tears X Wind (Shumari)
- Tetsuko no Tabi (Masaki Kamimura)

2008

- Golgo 13 (Charlie)
- Sisters of Wellber (Zansu)

2009

- Chrome Shelled Regios (Jaymis)
- Hell Girl: Three Vessels (Shinji Kikyō)
- Natsume's Book of Friends (Harujizō)
- Viper's Creed (Jim)

2011

- Lotte no Omocha! (Professor Mīna)
- Maken-ki! Battling Venus (Goro Fujioka)

2014

- Blade & Soul (Tate Roll)
- Future Card Buddyfight (Demon Lord Asmodai, Card Rhino, Qinus Axia)
- Hero Bank (Delon Arai)

2015

- Omakase! Miracle Cat-dan (Rintaro)

2016

- Duel Masters Versus Revolution Final (Gabe)

2017

- Armed Girl's Machiavellism (Kusuo Masukodera)

2018

- Muhyo & Roji's Bureau of Supernatural Investigation (Teeki)
- Bakugan: Battle Planet (Kelion)

2020

- Muhyo & Roji's Bureau of Supernatural Investigation Season 2 (Teeki)

=== Original Video Animation ===
- Armed Girl's Machiavellism (2017), Kusuo Masukodera

=== Film ===
- Gintama: The Movie (Sagaru Yamazaki)
- Gintama: The Movie: The Final Chapter: Be Forever Yorozuya (Sagaru Yamazaki)

=== Vomic ===
- Rockin' Heaven (Kazutomo Konishi)

=== Tokusatsu ===
2011

- Kaizoku Sentai Gokaiger (Shikabanen (ep. 1))

2017

- Uchu Sentai Kyuranger (Micro Tsuyoindaver (ep. 31))

=== Dubbing ===
==== Live-action ====
- Shoot 'Em Up (Lone Man (Greg Bryk))

==== Animation ====
- Adventure Time (Lumpy Space Princess, Peppermint Butler, Cinnamon Bun, Lumpy Space Prince)
- Bob the Builder (Spud (second voice))
- Mao Mao: Heroes of Pure Heart (King Snugglemane the 25th)
- Moominvalley (The Hemulen)
- Rated A for Awesome (Noam Plinsky)
