= Hokkaido Gals Are Super Adorable! =

Japanese manga series by Kai Ikada

- Cover of the first tankōbon volume of Hokkaido Gals Are Super Adorable!, featuring Minami Fuyuki

道産子ギャルはなまらめんこい (Dosanko Gyaru wa Namaramenkoi)
- Genre: Romantic comedy
- Manga
- Written by: Kai Ikada
- Published by: Shueisha
- English publisher: NA: Seven Seas Entertainment
- Imprint: Jump Comics+
- Magazine: Shōnen Jump+
- Original run: September 4, 2019 – September 10, 2024
- Volumes: 14
- Anime television series
- Directed by: Mirai Minato (Note: Credited as Chief Director (総監督, Sō Kantoku).); Misuzu Hoshino
- Produced by: Takuya Matsumoto; Norio Yamakawa; Mai Miyaji; Masaharu Hirooka; Norio Fukui
- Written by: Mirai Minato
- Music by: Sounosuke Takao
- Studio: Silver Link; Blade
- Licensed by: Crunchyroll
- Original network: TV Tokyo, TVh, BS TV Tokyo, AT-X
- Original run: January 9, 2024 – March 26, 2024
- Episodes: 12
- icon

Hokkaido Gals Are Super Adorable! (Japanese: 道産子ギャルはなまらめんこい, Hepburn: Dosanko Gyaru wa Namaramenkoi) (Note: The title uses dialectal Hokkaido vocabulary.) is a Japanese manga series written and illustrated by Kai Ikada. The story follows a Tokyo teenager who moves to Japan's northernmost prefecture of Hokkaido and meets a girl unlike any he has ever met before.

It was serialized for free on the Shōnen Jump+ application and website from September 2019 to September 2024, with the chapters collected and published into fourteen tankōbon volumes by Shueisha as of November 2024. Shueisha also publishes the series in English for free on the Manga Plus app and website. An anime television series adaptation produced by Silver Link and Blade aired from January to March 2024.

== Premise ==
Teenager Tsubasa Shiki moves from Tokyo to the city of Kitami in Hokkaido. Upon arrival, he meets his classmate and native gal (gyaru) Minami Fuyuki, who takes a liking to the city boy and takes him under her wing. Finding her unlike any other girl he has met before, Tsubasa finds himself drawn to this Hokkaido gal.

== Characters ==
Tsubasa Shiki (四季 翼, Shiki Tsubasa)
Voiced by: Nobunaga Shimazaki (Japanese); Matt Shipman (English)
A 16-year-old transfer student from Tokyo, who has no experience with girls and was considered boring in his hometown by his peers. Despite initially telling himself that she is not his type and that her actions are immoral, he realizes he has a crush on Minami, finding her forwardness enticing and her beauty irresistible. The two grow closer as she helps Tsubasa adjust to his new life in Hokkaido. Although not explicitly confirmed, flashbacks of his earlier life suggest he comes from a wealthy family. At the end of the series, he and Minami get married and have a daughter named Mio, with the final chapter featuring an adult Mio getting married.
Minami Fuyuki (冬木 美波, Fuyuki Minami)
Voiced by: Ayane Sakura (Japanese); Mikaela Krantz (English)
Tsubasa's 16-year-old classmate at Kitami Hokuryo High School, who is popular and talkative, speaking in a heavy Hokkaido dialect. She follows the gal (gyaru) subculture; dyeing her hair blonde, wearing short skirts in winter, and refusing to wear gloves in the winter so that she can still use her phone. She seems to have a crush on Tsubasa and enjoys flirting with him to make him embarrassed and flustered. She later marries Tsubasa and has a daughter with him. In the dub, she speaks with a heavy North-Central American accent.
Sayuri Akino (秋野 沙友理, Akino Sayuri)
Voiced by: Yumiri Hanamori (Japanese); Brittany Lauda (English)
Tsubasa and Minami's classmate who, with her raven-hair, reserved personality and choice not to use the Hokkaido dialect, is the exact opposite of Minami. She is more reticent, but pays just enough attention to social trends in order to fit in with her peers. Because she sweats a lot, Sayuri avoided all forms of exercise, which eventually found her avoiding people in general. As they both find it difficult to socialize, Sayuri feels a kinship with Tsubasa, and decides to befriend him and Minami. She was born in Asahikawa and moved to Kitami when she was in elementary.
Rena Natsukawa (夏川 怜奈, Natsukawa Rena)
Voiced by: Reina Ueda (Japanese); Jill Harris (English)
Tsubasa's neighbor and senpai or upperclassman one grade above him, whom Minami idolizes. She has short white-gray hair and is believed to be mixed-race. Rena is a history buff and at the top of her class academically but is really timid, even though she has also won the school beauty contest two years in a row. She offers to tutor Tsubasa and asks him to take her on a date in exchange.
Asuka (飛鳥)
Voiced by: Mariko Nagai (Japanese); Erin Kelly Noble (English)
Sayuri's childhood friend and underclassman one grade below her. A member of the swim team, she is athletic and has short hair and a dark complexion. Asuka tries to support Sayuri and her romantic feelings for Tsubasa as much as she can.
Hina (日菜)
Voiced by: Yurika Kubo (Japanese); Rachel Thompson (English)
Asuka's friend and classmate who calls herself Minami's biggest fan. She has long hair and wears big glasses. Having gone to the same middle school as Minami, she is obsessed with her as she resembles her favorite fictional character. Hina follows Minami on the internet and thoroughly researches everything around her, including Tsubasa.
Takayumi Matsuo (松尾 隆弓, Matsuo Takayumi)
Voiced by: Yoshitsugu Matsuoka (Japanese); Travis Mullenix (English)
A male classmate of Tsubasa and Minami.
Mai Fuyuki (冬木 眞衣, Fuyuki Mai)
Voiced by: Eri Kitamura (Japanese); Elise Baughman (English)
Minami's mother, who is also a gal.
Momoko Fuyuki (冬木 桃子, Fuyuki Momoko)
Voiced by: Rika Nagae (Japanese); Ariel Graham (English)
Minami's younger sister.
Kaede Hanamiya (花宮 楓, Hanamiya Kaede)
Voiced by: Yōko Imaizumi (Japanese); Linda Leonard (English)
Tsubasa's prim and proper grandmother, whom he lives with in Hokkaido.

== Production ==
Hokkaido Gals Are Super Adorable! is written and illustrated by Kai Ikada (伊科田海), who is from Kitami where the story takes place. In the original Japanese title, dosanko is a word for a breed of pony native to Hokkaido, which was later extended to mean also "Hokkaido-raised" when referring to people, gyaru refers to a member of the gal subculture, namara is a Hokkaido dialect word meaning "very" or "super", and menkoi is Hokkaido dialect for "cute" or "adorable." It began as a 19-page one-shot titled Instant Gal Menko-chan (インスタントギャルメンコちゃん, Insutanto Gyaru Menko-chan) that Ikada wrote in five days to represent Hokkaido in the 2018 Jump Scout Caravan Cup. A different one-shot was published in January 2019 as part of a Shōnen Jump+ New Year event, and was selected to become a serialization due to its popularity.

Speaking of the advantages he now has on the digital Shōnen Jump+ as opposed to when he worked in printed manga magazines, Ikada said he now has a high degree of freedom and gets a lot of feedback from readers. On the former he explained he has much more freedom as far as serialization frequency, number of pages, genre and methods of expression. As an example of the feedback he receives, he cited how he gained over 36,000 followers on Twitter by October 2020 thanks to Hokkaido Gals Are Super Adorable!. The series was on hiatus from April to May 2020 due to Ikada's poor health. Originally published weekly, it switched to a biweekly schedule following chapter 49 on February 17, 2021. In order to prepare for the series' ending, the manga went on hiatus from August 16, 2023, until September 13, 2023.

== Media ==
=== Manga ===
Written and illustrated by Kai Ikada, Hokkaido Gals Are Super Adorable! was serialized on the Shōnen Jump+ application and website from September 4, 2019, to September 10, 2024. Its chapters have been collected and published into fourteen tankōbon volumes by Shueisha as of November 1, 2024. A special one-shot of Hokkaido Gals Are Super Adorable! was published in Weekly Shōnen Jump's first issue of 2021, which was released on December 7, 2020. Shueisha began publishing the series in English for free on the Manga Plus app and website on September 1, 2020. In March 2025, Seven Seas Entertainment announced that they had licensed the series for English publication in a 2-in-1 omnibus release, with the first omnibus volume set to release in December 2025.

==== Volumes ====
No.	Original release date	Original ISBN	English release date	English ISBN
1	December 4, 2019	978-4-08-882165-8	December 9, 2025	979-8-89561-702-1
Chapters 0–7
2	March 4, 2020	978-4-08-882272-3	December 9, 2025	979-8-89561-702-1
Chapters 8–16
3	July 3, 2020	978-4-08-882374-4	March 31, 2026	979-8-89561-863-9
Chapters 17–26
4	December 4, 2020	978-4-08-882543-4	March 31, 2026	979-8-89561-863-9
Chapters 27–35
5	April 2, 2021	978-4-08-882638-7	July 21, 2026	979-8-89561-864-6
Chapters 36–47
6	August 4, 2021	978-4-08-882775-9	July 21, 2026	979-8-89561-864-6
Chapters 48–56
7	December 3, 2021	978-4-08-882861-9	November 24, 2026	979-8-89561-865-3
Chapters 57–65
8	June 3, 2022	978-4-08-883082-7	November 24, 2026	979-8-89561-865-3
Chapters 66–75
9	November 4, 2022	978-4-08-883331-6	—	—
Chapters 76–83
10	March 3, 2023	978-4-08-883416-0	—	—
Chapters 84–91
11	July 4, 2023	978-4-08-883655-3	—	—
Chapters 92–98
12	December 4, 2023	978-4-08-883810-6	—	—
Chapters 99–103
13	May 2, 2024	978-4-08-883896-0	—	—
Chapters 104–111
14	November 1, 2024	978-4-08-884263-9	—	—
Chapters 112–119

=== Anime ===
An anime television series adaptation was announced on October 26, 2022. The series was produced by Silver Link and Blade and directed by Misuzu Hoshino, with scripts supervised by Mirai Minato, who also serves as chief director, and character designs handled by Katsuyuki Sato. It was initially scheduled for 2023, but was later delayed, and eventually aired from January 9 to March 26, 2024, on TV Tokyo and other networks. (Note: TV Tokyo listed the series premiere on January 8, 2024 at 24:30, which is effectively January 9 at 12:30 a.m. JST.) The opening theme song is "Namaramenkoi Gyaru" (なまらめんこいギャル; "Super Adorable Gal"), performed by Masayoshi Ōishi, while the ending theme song is "Wayawayawa-!" (わやわやわー！; "Pretty Crazy-!"), performed by Asaka.

Crunchyroll streamed the series worldwide outside of Asia. An English dub starring Matt Shipman and Mikaela Krantz with Jeremy Inman as voice director premiered on January 22, 2024. The It's Anime YouTube channel began uploading the series on February 6, 2024, in South Korea.

==== Episodes ====
No.	Title (Note: All English titles are taken from Crunchyroll.)	Directed by (Note: Information is taken from the ending credits of each episode.)	Written by	Storyboarded by	Original release date
1	"Hokkaido Gals Are Super Adorable!"; Transliteration: "Dosanko Gyaru wa Namara Menkoi" (Japanese: 道産子ギャルはなまらめんこい)	Misuzu Hoshino	Mirai Minato	Misuzu Hoshino	January 9, 2024
2	"It's Super Warm Inside the Snow Fort"; Transliteration: "Kamakura no Chuu wa Namara Nukui" (Japanese: かまくらの中はなまらぬくい)	Ken Andou	Nanami Hoshino	Mina Okita	January 16, 2024
3	"Akino-san Is Super Unfriendly"; Transliteration: "Akino-san wa Namara Tsurenai" (Japanese: 秋野さんはなまらつれない)	Toshikatsu Tokoro	Misaki Morie	Tetsurō Amino	January 23, 2024
4	"Nighttime Calls Are Super Ticklish"; Transliteration: "Yoru no Denwa wa Namara mo Chokoi" (Japanese: 夜の電話はなまらもちょこい)	Michita Shiraishi	Michiko Yokote	Kouji Yoshikawa; Hikaru Takeuchi	January 30, 2024
5	"Super Bitter, Super Sweet"; Transliteration: "Namara Nigakute Namara Amai" (Japanese: なまら苦くてなまら甘い)	Hiromichi Matano	Nanami Hoshino	Mina Okita	February 6, 2024
6	"Natsukawa-Senpai Is Super Good-Looking"; Transliteration: "Natsukawa-senpai wa Namara Kiriyō Yoshi" (Japanese: 夏川先輩はなまらきりょーよし)	Misuzu Hoshino	Misaki Morie	Yoriyasu Kogawa	February 13, 2024
7	"Final Exams Are Super Hard"; Transliteration: "Kimatsu Shiken wa Namara Yurukunai" (Japanese: 期末試験はなまらゆるくない)	Naoki Hoshikawa	Misaki Morie	Kouji Yoshikawa; Hikaru Takeuchi	February 20, 2024
8	"Yakiniku with Friends Is Super Delish"; Transliteration: "Min'na de Yakiniku wa Namara Umai" (Japanese: みんなで焼肉はなまらうまい)	Misuzu Hoshino	Michiko Yokote	Mina Okita	February 27, 2024
9	"Lake Abashiri Is Super Relaxing"; Transliteration: "Abashiri-ko wa Namara Azuma Shii" (Japanese: 網走湖はなまらあずましい)	Michita Shiraishi	Michiko Yokote	Mina Okita	March 5, 2024
10	"Time Flies Super Fast"; Transliteration: "Toki wa Namara Nagare-ra Saru" (Japanese: 時はなまら流らさる)	Toshikatsu Tokoro	Michiko Yokote	Kouji Yoshikawa; Hikaru Takeuchi	March 12, 2024 (Note: This episode aired at 12:40 a.m. JST, 10 minutes after the original air time on TV Tokyo.)
11	"Youth Hits Super Hard in the Feels"; Transliteration: "Seishun tte Namara e Moi" (Japanese: 青春ってなまらえもい)	Shinya Kawatsura	Nanami Hoshino	Mio Hidenio	March 19, 2024 (Note: This episode aired at 1:00 a.m. JST, 30 minutes after the original air time on TV Tokyo.)
12	"Life Without You Feels Super Off"; Transliteration: "Kimi ga Inai to Namara Izui" (Japanese: 君がいないとなまらいずい)	Misuzu Hoshino	Mirai Minato	Mina Okita	March 26, 2024

=== Other media ===
Hokkaido Gals Are Super Adorable! received a vomic adaptation, where voice actors, music and sound effects are heard as the manga images appear on screen. Beginning on January 25, 2021, episodes were uploaded to Jump Comics' official YouTube channel.

== Reception ==
By June 2021, Hokkaido Gals Are Super Adorable! had sold over 300,000 copies. When the first collected volume was released in December 2019, it immediately received a reprint due to demand. Comic Natalie reported that the first and second volumes were each the best-selling manga at the chain store Comic Zin during their respective first weeks of release.

Anime News Network's Richard Eisenbeis, in a review for the anime adaptation, describes the series as an enjoyable, if tame, romance show. While Eisenbeis felt that it was sometimes like a tourism commercial for Hokkaido that may seem like an unwanted distraction, he praised the characters for being deeper than they appear on the surface.

== See also ==
- Okitsura – another manga series with a similar concept
