= The Kept Man of the Princess Knight =

Japanese light novel series

- First light novel volume cover

姫騎士様のヒモ (Himekishi-sama no Himo)
- Genre: High fantasy, noir
- Light novel
- Written by: Tōru Shirogane
- Illustrated by: Saki Mashima
- Published by: ASCII Media Works
- English publisher: NA: Yen Press
- Imprint: Dengeki Bunko
- Original run: February 10, 2022 – present
- Volumes: 7
- Manga
- Written by: Tōru Shirogane
- Illustrated by: Keyyang
- Published by: ASCII Media Works
- English publisher: NA: Yen Press
- Imprint: Dengeki Comics NEXT
- Magazine: ComicWalker (Note: ComicWalker changed its name to KadoComi (カドコミ) in December 2023.)
- Original run: September 9, 2022 – December 2024
- Volumes: 3
- Manga

The Kept Man of the Princess Knight Act2
- Written by: Tōru Shirogane
- Illustrated by: Chihiro Yamazaki
- Published by: ASCII Media Works
- Imprint: Dengeki Comics NEXT
- Magazine: KadoComi
- Original run: August 31, 2025 – present
- Volumes: 1
- Anime television series
- Directed by: Chihiro Kumano
- Written by: Deko Akao
- Music by: Taku Iwasaki
- Studio: Blade
- Original run: January 2027 – scheduled
- icon

The Kept Man of the Princess Knight (Japanese: 姫騎士様のヒモ, Hepburn: Himekishi-sama no Himo) is a Japanese light novel series written by Tōru Shirogane and illustrated by Saki Mashima. It began publication under ASCII Media Works' Dengeki Bunko light novel imprint in February 2022. A manga adaptation illustrated by Keyyang was serialized on Kadokawa's ComicWalker manga website from September 2022 to December 2024, with a sequel illustrated by Chihiro Yamazaki beginning serialization on the same website in August 2025. An anime television series adaptation produced by Blade is set to premiere in January 2027.

== Plot ==
Dungeons are crawling with monsters, but also contain endless treasures. Princess knight Arwin is aiming to restore her kingdom using the riches found inside one, so she leads a raid into one. Matthew, a former adventurer, is one of the people who joins her party. Despite people perceiving him as a drunkard and a coward, his true abilities are actually more impressive than anyone, even the princess, could imagine.

== Characters ==
Matthew (マシュー, Mashū)
Voiced by: Junichi Suwabe
Arwin (アルウィン, Aruwin)
Voiced by: Mikako Komatsu
Vanessa (ヴァネッサ, Vuanessa)
Voiced by: Rie Takahashi
Dezu (でず)
Voiced by: Tetsu Inada
April (四月, Shigatsu)
Voiced by: Rika Nagae

== Media ==
=== Light novel ===
Written by Tōru Shirogane and illustrated by Saki Mashima, The Kept Man of the Princess Knight began publication under ASCII Media Works' Dengeki Bunko light novel imprint on February 10, 2022. Seven volumes have been released as of July 2026.

During their panel at Anime Expo 2023, Yen Press announced that they had licensed the series for English publication.

No.	Original release date	Original ISBN	North American release date	North American ISBN
1	February 10, 2022	978-4-04-914215-0	February 20, 2024	978-1-9753-7499-0
2	June 10, 2022	978-4-04-914400-0	June 18, 2024	978-1-9753-7501-0
3	November 10, 2022	978-4-04-914584-7	October 15, 2024	979-8-8554-0126-4
4	April 7, 2023	978-4-04-914869-5	April 1, 2025	979-8-8554-0757-0
5	September 8, 2023	978-4-04-915143-5	October 21, 2025	979-8-8554-0759-4
6	May 10, 2025	978-4-04-916503-6	August 11, 2026	979-8-8554-3448-4
7	July 10, 2026	978-4-04-916101-4	—	—

=== Manga ===
A manga adaptation illustrated by Keyyang was serialized on Kadokawa's ComicWalker manga website from September 9, 2022, to December 2024. The manga's chapters were collected by ASCII Media Works into three tankōbon volumes released from February 25, 2023, to December 26, 2024. During their panel at Anime NYC 2023, Yen Press announced that they had also licensed the manga adaptation for English publication.

A sequel illustrated by Chihiro Yamazaki, titled The Kept Man of the Princess Knight Act2, began serialization on the same website on August 31, 2025. The manga's chapters have been collected into a single tankōbon volume as of January 27, 2026.

==== Volumes ====
No.	Original release date	Original ISBN	North American release date	North American ISBN
1	February 25, 2023	978-4-04-914909-8	May 21, 2024	978-1-9753-9706-7
2	October 26, 2023	978-4-04-915269-2	December 17, 2024	979-8-8554-0118-9
3	December 26, 2024	978-4-04-916009-3	December 16, 2025	979-8-8554-2422-5

==== Act 2 ====
No.	Original release date	Original ISBN	North American release date	North American ISBN
1	January 27, 2026	978-4-04-914909-8	—	—

=== Anime ===
An anime television series adaptation was announced during the "Dengeki Bunko Winter Festival 2025" livestream event on February 16, 2025. The series will be produced by Blade and directed by Chihiro Kumano, with Deko Akao handling series composition, Hisao Ishii designing the characters, and Taku Iwasaki composing the music. It is set to premiere in January 2027. The opening theme song is "True-Taboo", performed by Myth & Roid, and the ending theme song is "Flower Head" (ギカ, Gika), performed by Sajou no Hana.

== Reception ==
The series won the Grand Prize at the 28th Dengeki Novel Prize in 2021.
