= Level 1 Demon Lord and One Room Hero =

Japanese manga series

- First tankōbon volume cover, featuring Max (above) and the Demon Lord (below)

Lv1魔王とワンルーム勇者 (Reberu Wan Maō to Wan Rūmu Yūsha)
- Genre: Fantasy comedy
- Manga
- Written by: toufu
- Published by: Houbunsha
- English publisher: NA: Seven Seas Entertainment
- Imprint: Fuz Comics
- Magazine: Comic Fuz
- Original run: March 29, 2019 – June 4, 2024
- Volumes: 11
- Anime television series
- Directed by: Keisuke Inoue
- Produced by: Norio Fukui; Akihiro Sotokawa; Shuka Nishimae; Nobuaki Takahashi; Mai Kawasaki; Haruki Kuroda
- Written by: Toshiya Ono
- Music by: R.O.N
- Studio: Silver Link; Blade
- Licensed by: Sentai Filmworks: SA/SEA: Medialink
- Original network: AT-X, Tokyo MX, BS NTV
- Original run: July 3, 2023 – September 18, 2023
- Episodes: 12
- icon

Level 1 Demon Lord and One Room Hero (Japanese: Lv1魔王とワンルーム勇者, Hepburn: Reberu Wan Maō to Wan Rūmu Yūsha) is a Japanese web manga series written and illustrated by toufu. It was serialized in Houbunsha's Comic Fuz website from March 2019 to June 2024, with its chapters collected in 11 tankōbon volumes. An anime television series adaptation produced by Silver Link and Blade aired from July to September 2023.

== Plot ==
The hero Max and his party slay the Demon Lord. Ten years later, the Demon Lord resurrects, but now looks like an androgynous young boy. Eager for a rematch, the Demon Lord tracks Max down, only to find that after being rejected by society, he has become an unemployed slacker who lives in a one-room apartment. The Demon Lord decides to move in with him and try to get him back into shape so that they can have their rematch, much to the frustration of the Demon Lord's secretary, Zenia.

== Characters ==
Max (マックス, Makkusu)
Voiced by: Yuichi Nakamura (Japanese); Joe Daniels (English)
The legendary hero that struck the final blow against the Demon Lord ten years prior, Max grew intoxicated from fame and fell from grace. He retains most of his physical strength and mental acumen despite his slovenly appearance, although he has also become jaded over the paths his friends and humanity in general have taken.
Demon Lord (魔王, Maō)
Voiced by: Naomi Ōzora (Japanese); Brittney Karbowski (English)
The very Demon Lord that threatened the world. After reincarnating, he personally seeks out the man that defeated him. Once he discovers the state Max is in, he vows to train Max back to the status of a hero for their inevitable rematch.
Zenia (ゼニア)
Voiced by: Yoko Hikasa (Japanese); Natalie Rial (English)
The Demon Lord's voluptuous and fiercely loyal personal secretary. She makes up for her lack of magic ability with immense physical strength. After discovering where the Demon Lord went, she moves into the apartment next door to keep an eye on them.
Fred (フレッド, Fureddo)
Voiced by: Yoshitsugu Matsuoka (Japanese); Adam Gibbs (English)
The cleric of Max's party who has since risen to the position of the Chief Secretary of the Kingdom's Magic Bureau. A former conman despite his strong magic abilities, Fred is easily angered and also not above using emotional manipulation and blackmail for his own personal gain.
Leo (レオ, Reo)
Voiced by: Hiro Shimono (Japanese); Michael Wronski (English)
A physically powerful fighter and one of Max's former party members, he had allegedly defected from the Kingdom sometime after the Demon Lord's defeat to set up his own "republic", leading it to a measure of prosperity but earning the ire of his former allegiance - and his former partner - in the process.
Yuria (ユリア)
Voiced by: Ami Koshimizu (Japanese); Alyssa Marek (English)
The wizard of Max's party who hid her genuine concern for the party's wellbeing out of pride and a personal sense of competitiveness. She retired and also disappeared from the public eye after the Demon Lord's defeat.

== Media ==
=== Manga ===
Written and illustrated by toufu, Level 1 Demon Lord and One Room Hero was serialized on Houbunsha's Comic Fuz website from March 29, 2019, to June 4, 2024. The series was collected into 11 tankōbon volumes released from March 2020 to July 2024. In February 2021, Seven Seas Entertainment announced that it had licensed the series for English publication in print and digital formats.

==== Volumes ====
No.	Original release date	Original ISBN	English release date	English ISBN
1	March 2, 2020	978-4-8322-3721-6	August 17, 2021	978-1-64827-586-9
2	April 3, 2020	978-4-8322-3727-8	October 5, 2021	978-1-64827-615-6
3	July 1, 2020	978-4-8322-3753-7	January 11, 2022	978-1-64827-643-9
4	March 1, 2021	978-4-8322-3807-7	April 12, 2022	978-1-63858-189-5
5	August 2, 2021	978-4-8322-3845-9	February 21, 2023	978-1-63858-605-0
6	April 1, 2022	978-4-8322-3906-7	October 22, 2024	979-8-88843-014-9
7	October 3, 2022	978-4-8322-3946-3	December 24, 2024	979-8-88843-128-3
8	July 3, 2023	978-4-8322-0305-1	April 8, 2025	979-8-89160-189-5
9	August 1, 2023	978-4-8322-0313-6	September 2, 2025	979-8-89373-661-8
10	February 1, 2024	978-4-8322-0361-7	January 20, 2026	979-8-89373-662-5
11	July 1, 2024	978-4-8322-0413-3	May 12, 2026	979-8-89373-663-2

=== Anime ===
An anime television series adaptation was announced on March 29, 2022. The series was produced by Silver Link and Blade and directed by Keisuke Inoue, with scripts written by Toshiya Ono, character designs by Yoshihiro Watanabe, and music composed by R.O.N. It aired from July 3 to September 18, 2023, on AT-X and other networks. The opening theme is "One Room Adventure", performed by Madkid, and the ending theme is "Mirai=Teleport" (ミライ=テレポート), performed by Nenne. Sentai Filmworks licensed the series for streaming on Hidive. In June 2024, it was announced that the series would receive an English dub, which premiered on Hidive on August 20. Medialink licensed the series in South, Southeast Asia, and Oceania (except Australia and New Zealand) for streaming on the Ani-One Asia YouTube channel.

==== Episodes ====
No.	Title	Directed by	Written by	Storyboarded by	Original release date
1	"The Demon Lord Returns!"; Transliteration: "Maō Fukkatsu!" (Japanese: 魔王復活！)	Keisuke Inoue	Toshiya Ōno	Keisuke Inoue	July 3, 2023
Max the Hero and his party defeat the Demon Lord, who swears to return. Ten years later, the Demon Lord reincarnates, but his army has entered hibernation except for his secretary Zenia. Lacking his former magic power, he now resembles an androgynous young boy. In his absence, society has advanced to resemble the modern world. Desiring his revenge, the Demon Lord locates Max and is disappointed to find Max is now a lazy, unemployed slacker living alone in a one room apartment. Max reveals after the Demon Lord's defeat, society did not need him anymore and after a series of public scandals, he faded into obscurity. The Demon Lord tries to rouse Max by threatening to raise his army and destroy the world, but Max has grown to hate the world that rejected him and has no objections to letting the former destroy everything. Completely dejected, the Demon Lord leaves but Max is surprised when the former returns, announcing he is moving in to kick Max into shape as a worthy hero while waiting for his own powers to return so they can finally enjoy their rematch.
2	"Beware the Glasses Girl"; Transliteration: "Megane Onna ni Goyōshin" (Japanese: メガネ女にご用心)	Toshikatsu Tokoro	Toshiya Ōno	Toshikatsu Tokoro	July 10, 2023
Curious where Max goes every day, the Demon Lord disguises himself as a voluptuous schoolgirl to follow him. He is disappointed all Max does is drink and play with some local children. When thugs start beating him and he does not fight back, the Demon Lord puts them to sleep. Grudgingly, he respects Max for controlling his temper. Zenia locates the Demon Lord at Max's apartment, having gotten worried he was gone for three days. She is baffled that the Demon Lord is trying to help Max. Deciding the best option is to kill Max, she attacks him but is defeated. Covered in sweat, she uses Max's shower while the Demon Lord goes shopping. A towel clad Zenia accidentally becomes drunk and attacks Max again, and the fight spills outside. Before they can really fight, Zenia is arrested for public nudity but Max is able to straighten things out with the police. Max is exasperated when, rather than going home, Zenia rents the next door apartment to be close to the Demon Lord. Meanwhile, Fred, one of Max's former party members, sees footage of Zenia's nude rampage and is suspicious of why Max knows a demon.
3	"Fred the Cleric"; Transliteration: "Sōryo Fureddo" (Japanese: 僧侶フレッド)	Yoshitsugu Kimura	Toshiya Ōno	Kōji Yoshikawa & Hikaru Takeuchi	July 17, 2023
Zenia asks about Leo, another of Max's former party members who famously defected from the Kingdom to found his own country, and the Gamma Republic, which is now at war with the Kingdom. Max leaves too angry to talk about Leo and is ambushed by a reporter. Fred, now Chief of the Bureau of Magic, later arrives at Max's apartment, so the Demon Lord hides in the closet. Fred is concerned about the Gamma Republic because despite claiming to be a country, it is actually an army of criminals occupying land stolen from the Kingdom. Fred begs Max to help end the war before it can get any worse, but Max refuses. Fred reveals he knows the nude woman is a demon, which might be enough for Max to be tried for treason against humanity. Fred abruptly leaves terrified, having realized Max is unknowingly being haunted by a female ghost. Flashbacks show in his youth Fred was a Cleric and a con man, but when circumstances forced him to aid Max and Leo in battle against demons, he reformed and joined their party to protect people.
4	"The Hero's New Challenge"; Transliteration: "Yūsha no Arata Naru Chōsen!" (Japanese: 勇者の新たなる挑戦！)	Hiromichi Matano	Toshiya Ōno	Hiromichi Matano	July 24, 2023
The Demon Lord decides love will kickstart Max as a hero and offers him Zenia as a bride. However, Max rejects Zenia and all the other candidates. Exasperated, the Demon Lord transforms into his schoolgirl disguise as a joke, but finds while transformed into a woman he and Max are sexually attracted to each other; disaster is only averted by Zenia interrupting. The Demon Lord offers to transform Max into a demon, employ him as a soldier on wages of 2.5 million yen a month and grant him a demon soul so he will always reincarnate after dying. Max refuses as he fears he would not be himself anymore. The Demon Lord hides his disappointment as he had hoped he and Max could be friends forever. Having contemplated immortality, Max is inspired to improve his human existence and decides to earn money by recording videos and becoming an online celebrity. The Demon Lord is glad Max is finally showing initiative but Max is disheartened when he fails to gain popularity with his videos. Desperate, he starts a live stream of the Demon Lord as the schoolgirl, but gets his account terminated for streaming lewd content.
5	"With His Grace!"; Transliteration: "Heika to!" (Japanese: へいかとっ！)	Kōki Onoue	Toshiya Ōno	Kōki Onoue	July 31, 2023
In their youth, Leo and Max competed to become the Hero. In the present, the Demon Lord takes Max shopping in his schoolgirl disguise. Max is confronted by his old friend Anego, who defected with Leo. She claims they are not criminals at all; when Leo defected, the Kingdom mockingly gave him worthless wastelands to live on, which the Gamma Republic citizens have worked hard to cultivate. However, when the wastelands turned out to contain magic ore, the Kingdom started the war to steal back the ore. Leo wants Max to defect too and has invited him to visit Gamma Republic before he decides. Meanwhile, an impatient Will, who is Anego's younger brother, takes the Demon Lord hostage to force Max's cooperation, assuming they are lovers. After throwing Will into the ocean, Max asks to be left alone. Intrigued, the Demon Lord hypnotizes Max long enough to get him on the airship to visit Leo. Afraid of being recognized, Max disguises himself and they quickly find Leo is a muscular, permanently cheerful idiot beloved by his citizens. Max confirms Leo has not changed since their hero days.
6	"Border Tug-of-War"; Transliteration: "Kokkyōsen no Kōbō" (Japanese: 国境線の攻防)	Toshikatsu Tokoro	Toshiya Ōno	Toshikatsu Tokoro	August 7, 2023
Fighting abruptly breaks out at the border with the Kingdom. Nearby citizens claim such fights are common and of little interest. The Demon Lord flies Max close to the border where they discover the Republic is protecting the border with a force field, and any Kingdom soldiers that attack are harmlessly put to sleep with magic. A Kingdom mage penetrates the shield with a powerful sniper spell, injuring Anego. Leo drives the army away before confronting his former mentor, Captain Galmoff, with the Kingdom's selfish hypocrisy. The mage shoots Leo in the neck, but Leo is unhurt and sends the mage back with an invitation for Fred to discuss peace when he is ready. Having seen Leo in action, the Demon Lord is satisfied and prepares to teleport home. Leo senses the demonic magic and gives chase. Max battles Leo long enough for the Demon Lord to cast his teleportation spell. Leo recognizes Max just as they vanish and cannot understand why he would protect a demon. They arrive home, bashing the unhappy ghost on the head as they land. The Demon Lord thanks Max for protecting him.
7	"The Secretary Does Her Best"; Transliteration: "Hishokan Ganbaru" (Japanese: 秘書官がんばる)	Teppei Takeya	Toshiya Ōno	Taku Yonebayashi	August 14, 2023
During the Demon Lord and Max's trip to the Gamma Republic, Zenia begins investigating the Bureau of Magic. After hacking their computers, she is captured by Fred. Due to her idiocy, Fred quickly recognizes her and demands to know what her relationship is to Max. Unfortunately, Fred is called away by Lord Grimms, a Royal Minister who longs for the old days of heroes and suspects Leo was tricked into defecting after being framed for corruption. While Fred believes this is true, he still cannot forgive Leo for choosing to defect. Grimms is planning to propose a peace treaty with Leo, but he needs Fred's support to convince the other ministers, which Fred agrees to do. Meanwhile, Zenia is treated kindly by her guard, Lim, and she struggles with how to escape without hurting her. Zenia eventually succeeds but is restrained by Lim's fire magic. Once Grimms leaves, a bomb goes off in the building. An amused Grimms wonders how Fred will react to this "Republic terrorist attack".
8	"Farewell"; Transliteration: "Ketsubetsu" (Japanese: 決別)	Hiromichi Matano	Toshiya Ōno	Madoka Ozawa	August 21, 2023
Zenia chooses to help the injured Lim, taking her to Max's apartment. The Demon Lord is able to convince her he and Zenia are minor demons who were taken in by Max after the war. Fred calls Lim and realizing she is with Max, threatens to frame Max for the bombing unless he finally tells the truth. As Fred still fears the ghost in Max's closet, they arrange to meet at a restaurant. Meanwhile, Grimm meets the other eight Ministers where he is told to convince Fred to defeat Leo so they stand a better chance at victory when they declare war. At the restaurant, Fred again threatens to frame Max unless he fights the Republic. Max counters by threatening to defect to the Republic. Their fight ends when the Demon Lord accidentally reveals his third eye, making Fred suspicious who he really is, but lets them peacefully leave for the moment. Max returns home feeling smug at rejecting Fred again, only to realize Fred childishly spiked his drink with laxatives. Elsewhere, an outraged Leo prepares the Republic for war due to being framed for a bombing he never ordered.
9	"A Hero Conflicted"; Transliteration: "Yūsha no Kattō" (Japanese: 勇者の葛藤)	Naoyoshi Kusaka	Toshiya Ōno	Yō Nakano	August 28, 2023
At Grimms' urging, Fred agrees to make Leo disappear. Elsewhere, Zenia continues analyzing the information stolen from the Bureau. The kingdom announces their intention to declare war and the public quickly blame Max for not returning as the hero before the situation got so bad. An unconcerned Max goes for a walk with the Demon Lord and they end up playing badminton with a young girl at the park. Max and the Demon Lord get in a fight over his plan to do nothing, leaving him unsure what to do. Meanwhile, despite risking his career, Fred disobeys orders and rather than sneak into the Republic to assassinate Leo quietly, he publicly invades all by himself in front of the world's media. Grimms is furious as it makes the Kingdom seem like brutal invaders instead of innocent victims of Leo's terrorist attacks, which causes the other ministers to blame him for Fred's actions. Meeting in the forest, Fred and Leo use magic to construct a giant stage so the whole world can see their duel to the death.
10	"Leo vs. Fred"; Transliteration: "Reo Bāsasu Fureddo" (Japanese: レオvsフレッド)	Junya Koshiba	Toshiya Ōno	Koichi Ohata	September 4, 2023
In the past, Max, Fred and Leo encountered Yuria, a sorceress who despite her insistence she would defeat the Demon Lord by herself, ended up on the same missions frequently. After encountering a necromancer she could not defeat alone, she was rescued by them. In the present, Leo and Fred viciously battle. Max feigns indifference until the Demon Lord provokes him into losing his temper, revealing he is desperate to do something but he would be forced to kill either Fred or Leo himself. Disappointed, the Demon Lord finally leaves Max with no intention of returning. He then appears between Fred and Leo to announce he has returned to restart the war and issues a public challenge to Max to fight him before he kills both Leo and Fred. However, Fred knocks the Demon Lord out with ease. Max, now angrier than he has ever been, retrieves his sword and dashes across the city to intervene in the battle, but mistimes his surprise attack and is knocked out by Fred and Leo at the same time. Back in the past, the necromancer fled and Yuria joined the hero party after unwillingly admitting they were now friends.
11	"The Hero, Covered in Mud"; Transliteration: "Yūsha Tsuchi ni Nureru" (Japanese: 勇者 土に塗れる)	Teppei Takeya	Toshiya Ōno	Teppei Takeya	September 11, 2023
In the past, Yuria predicted that if Fred and Leo ever fought, it would be a disaster only Max could stop. In the present, Yuria watches the battle while giving birth to her second child. Max recovers and the three friends vent their frustrations before they fight each other. After a ten-year retirement, Max is drastically out of practice. He considers just giving up but remembers a battle they almost lost against Dragon King Behemoth, until Yuria cast Maximum Drive on Max, an overpower spell that defeated Behemoth in one blow. Having kept a talisman Yuria gave him for emergencies, he is able to cast Maximum Drive on himself and engages Fred and Leo again. Fred realizes the futility of their fight as it will do nothing to stop the war, yet he decides to win the fight anyway. Meanwhile, the Demon Lord recovers in time to stops Fred's spell, allowing Max to claim victory. Before the world media, Max apologizes for the trouble his friends caused and begs the people of both the Kingdom and Republic to figure out a way to end the war peacefully. The Demon Lord watches Max proudly.
12	"The Fruits of Their Labor"; Transliteration: "Karera ga Motarashita Mono" (Japanese: 彼らがもたらしたもの)	Toshikatsu Tokoro	Toshiya Ōno	Toshikatsu Tokoro	September 18, 2023
The Demon Lord celebrates Max with a loud party, angering the ghost. Zenia falls for an online scam that steals the files she stole from the Magic Bureau. Due to Max's actions, the public turn against the war, forcing the Kingdom and Republic to declare peace. Fred is depressed so Lim tries to cheer him up with Max's terrible videos, but this only scares Fred as the ghost emerges from the screen to grab him. The Kingdom Ministers are divided on what to do and eventually settle on firing Fred. Due to the files leaked from Zenia's computer, Grimms is arrested for embezzlement, which the other ministers happily accept. Despite just being fired, Fred is promoted to replace Grimms as a minister. Max is hounded by reporters, which is watched with amusement by Yuria, who is the mother of the girl Max and the Demon Lord played badminton with. Having ended the war, Max hopes the Demon Lord will finally leave, but the latter declares Max has a long way to go before he can call himself the hero again, so he is staying with Max indefinitely, much to Max's frustration.
