= Mikaela Krantz =

American voice actress

- Occupation: Voice actress
- Years active: 2011–present
- Notable credits: Chio Miyamo in Chio's School Road; Ai Ohto in Wonder Egg Priority; Urara Shiraishi in Yamada-kun and the Seven Witches; Minami Fuyuki in Hokkaido Gals Are Super Adorable!

Mikaela Krantz is an American actress primarily performing live theatre and appearing in anime dubs.

== Personal life ==
Krantz is autistic. In 2021, she moved to Estonia to continue her education in folkloristics and applied heritage studies. As of 2024, however, she has returned to dubbing voiceovers in anime, starting with Hokkaido Gals Are Super Adorable!, where she voiced Minami Fuyuki.

== Filmography ==
=== Anime series ===
List of voice performances in anime series
Year	Title	Role	Notes	Ref.
2015	Ultimate Otaku Teacher	Suzune Kagami	Lead role	
2015	Shomin Sample	Reiko Arisugawa	Main role	
2015	Riddle Story of Devil	Mahiru Banba, Shinya Banba		
2015	Fairy Tail	Beth Vanderwood		
2016	Snow White with the Red Hair	Ryu		
2016	Divine Gate	K		
2016	Black Butler: Book of Circus	Doll		
2016	Gonna be the Twin-Tail!!	Erina Shindo, Tail Yellow	Main role	
2016	Shimoneta	Hyoka		
2016	Overlord	Clementine		
2016	Show By Rock!! 2	Rosia	Also Show By Rock!! Short!!	
2016	Drifters	masha		
2016	Keijo!!!!!!!!	Maya Sakashiro		
2017	Garo: Crimson Moon	Kintoki		
2017	Masamune-kun's Revenge	Momo		
2017	Interviews with Monster Girls	Kurtz		
2017	ACCA: 13-Territory Inspection Dept.	Carmin		
2017	Yamada-kun and the Seven Witches	Urara Shiraishi	Lead role	
2017	Brave Witches	Pilot Officer Naoe Kanno		
2017	Kado: The Right Answer	Saraka Tsukai		
2017	Tsugumomo	Nanako		
2017	Restaurant to Another World	Arius		
2017	Hina Logic – from Luck & Logic	Yayoi		
2017	Chronos Ruler	Emily		
2017	Tsuredure Children	Chiyo Kurihara		
2017	The Ancient Magus' Bride	Gwee		
2017	King's Game The Animation	Ria		
2017	Star Blazers: Space Battleship Yamato 2199	Kaoru Niimi		
2017	Hundred	Emile Crossfode	Lead role	
2018	Cardcaptor Sakura: Clear Card	Kero		
2018	Tokyo Ghoul:re	Tōru Mutsuki	Also Season 2	
2018	Aokana: Four Rhythm Across the Blue	Minamo		
2018	High School DxD Hero	Millicas Gremory		
2018	Steins;Gate 0	Fubuki		
2018	Hanebado!	Kaoruko		
2018	Chio's School Road	Chio Miyamo	Lead role	
2018	Angels of Death	Zack (young)		
2018	Magical Girl Raising Project	Calamity Mary		
2018	Kakuriyo: Bed and Breakfast for Spirits	Mei		
2018	Conception	Virgo		
2018	RErideD – Derrida, who leaps through time –	Derrida (young)		
2018	Ace Attorney (season 2)	Napalm		
2018	That Time I Got Reincarnated as a Slime	Gobtsu		
2019	Fruits Basket (2019 TV series)	Momiji Soma		
2019	Dr. Stone	Senku Ishigami (young)		
2019	Azur Lane	Prinz Eugen		
2019	Date A Live	young Shido Itsuka		
2020	Listeners	Ein		
2021	Wonder Egg Priority	Ai Ohto	Lead role	
2021	World Witches: Hasshin Shimasu!!	Pilot Officer Naoe Kanno		
2024	Hokkaido Gals Are Super Adorable!	Minami Fuyuki	Lead role	
2024	Metallic Rouge	Aes / Alice Machias		
2024	Alya Sometimes Hides Her Feelings in Russian	Chisaki Sarashina		
2024	Nina the Starry Bride	Colin		
2025	Failure Frame	Vicius		
2025	The Banished Court Magician Aims to Become the Strongest	Yorha		
2026	In the Clear Moonlit Dusk	Nobara		
2026	Daemons of the Shadow Realm	Gabby		
2026	The 100 Girlfriends Who Really, Really, Really, Really, Really Love You	Yamame Yasashiki	Season 3	
