= Iwa-Kakeru! Climbing Girls =

Japanese manga series

- First tankōbon volume cover of Iwa-Kakeru! Climbing Girls, featuring Konomi Kasahara

いわかける！ -Climbing Girls-
- Genre: Sports (climbing competition)
- Manga
- Written by: Ryūdai Ishizaka
- Published by: Cygames; Kodansha (distribution); Shogakukan (distribution)
- Imprint: Cycomi, Cycomi x Ura Sunday
- Magazine: Cycomi
- Original run: December 5, 2017 – May 18, 2019
- Volumes: 4
- Manga

Iwa-Kakeru!! Try a new climbing
- Written by: Ryūdai Ishizaki
- Published by: Cygames; Shogakukan (distribution)
- Imprint: Cycomi x Ura Sunday
- Magazine: Cycomi
- Original run: June 8, 2019 – March 20, 2021
- Volumes: 6
- Anime television series

Iwa-Kakeru! Sport Climbing Girls
- Directed by: Tetsurō Amino
- Written by: Touko Machida
- Music by: Tsubasa Ito
- Studio: Blade (Note: Production assistance (制作協力) for all episodes provided by Wit Studio and Studio Massket.)
- Licensed by: Crunchyroll (streaming); NA: Anime Limited (home video); SA/SEA: Medialink
- Original network: ANN (ABC, TV Asahi), AT-X
- Original run: October 4, 2020 – December 20, 2020
- Episodes: 12

Iwa-Kakeru! Climbing Girls (Japanese: いわかける！ -Climbing Girls-; lit. 'Rock Hanging') is a Japanese manga series written and illustrated by Ryūdai Ishizaka. It was serialized online via Cygames' Cycomi manga app and website from December 2017 to May 2019 and has been collected in four tankōbon volumes by Kodansha and Shogakukan. A sequel manga by Ishizaka, titled Iwa-Kakeru!! Try a new climbing (いわかける!! -Try a new climbing-), was also serialized online via Cycomi from June 2019 to March 2021. It has been collected in six tankōbon volumes by Shogakukan. An anime television series adaptation by Blade, titled Iwa-Kakeru! Sport Climbing Girls, aired from October to December 2020. The series follows Konomi Kasahara, a high school student who joins her school's climbing club and uses her puzzle-solving skills to excel at the sport.

== Plot ==
Konomi Kasahara is a first-year student who attends Hanamiya Girls' High School and is a master at puzzles. While looking for a club to join, she comes across the school's climbing wall. This fateful encounter changes her life when she becomes a member of the Climbing Club.

== Characters ==
=== Hanamiya Girls' High School ===
Konomi Kasahara (笠原好, Kasahara Konomi)
Voiced by: Sumire Uesaka
A first-year student at Hanamiya Girls' High School who is a master at puzzle games. The newest member of the Climbing Club, she uses her analytical skills to quickly find ideal routes up climbing walls, earning her the nicknames "Mother Eye" and "Murder Observation".
Jun Uehara (上原隼, Uehara Jun)
Voiced by: Yui Ishikawa
Another member of the Climbing Club who has trained in the sport since middle school. Her attitude towards other people hurts her ability to make friends outside of climbing competitions and has scared away potential new club members.
Sayo Yotsuba (四葉幸与, Yotsuba Sayo)
Voiced by: Aina Suzuki
President of the Climbing Club, she is referred to as the "Princess of Lead".
Nonoka Sugiura (杉浦野々華, Sugiura Nonoka)
Voiced by: Miyu Tomita
Member of the Climbing Club whose flexibility helps her grab holds too difficult for others.

=== Kurikawa High School ===
Chinari Iwamine (岩峰一愛, Iwamine Chinari)
Voiced by: Mikako Komatsu
A second-year student who is the ace of Kurikawa High. She is referred to as the "Climbing Spider" due to her taking advantage of her height and reach while she is climbing.
Chigusa Kumagai (熊谷千草, Kumagai Chigusa)
Voiced by: Sachi Kokuryu
A second-year student who is referred to as the "Muscle Maxima'am" due to her muscular build and physical strength.
Maruno Satou (佐藤丸乃, Satō Maruno)
Voiced by: Yumiri Hanamori
A first-year student who collects and analyzes data in order to prepare for competitions. Because of this, she is referred to as the "Lackey Data Climber".

=== St. Catalano Girls ===
Masumi Fujita (藤田真澄, Fujita Masumi)
Voiced by: Chihiro Ueda
A second-year student who is the ace of the team. She is referred to as "Black Panther" due to her explosiveness and leaping ability.
Rina Samura (沙村里奈, Sumura Rina)
Voiced by: Daria Midou
A second-year student who is supportive of Masumi. She is referred to as the "Crimson Stormtrooper" due to her being a fiery climber who is willing to help her teammates.
Kurea Ooba (大場久怜亜, Ōba Kurea)
Voiced by: Machico
A first-year student who is referred to as the "Ballerina of Rock" due to her sense of balance. Despite seeing Konomi as a rival from their ballet class, Kurea secretly admires her.

=== Kokureikan High School ===
Anne Kurusu (来栖 アンネ, Kurusu Anne)
Voiced by: Yukari Tamura
A very popular first-year student who is the ace of Kokureikan High. She is referred to as the "Princess of Climbing" due to her dominance in climbing competitions.
Hifumi Benibana (紅花一文, Benibana Hifumi)
Voiced by: Karin Isobe
A second-year student who is supportive of Anne.
Mimu Takahashi (高橋 水夢, Takahashi Mimu)
Voiced by: Sachika Misawa
A student who is very good at speed climbing thanks to rhythm games. She affectionately refers to Konomi as "Puzzle-chan".

=== Matsubase High School ===
Kaoru Niijima (新島香, Nījima Kaoru)
Voiced by: Yuka Terasaki
A second-year student who is referred as "Zombie Niijima" due to her ability to climb higher and higher with each attempt.
Akane Uchimura (内村茜, Uchimura Akane)
Voiced by: Akane Fujita
A first-year student who speaks in cat puns. She is referred as the "novice killer" due to her desire to drive newcomers out of the sport thanks to a petty grudge she has against Jun.

=== Other characters ===
Juzo Goto (後藤十三, Gotō Jūzō)
Voiced by: Takehito Koyasu
An outdoor climbing specialist who holds numerous records.
Kikuko Goto (後藤菊子, Gotō Kikuko)
Voiced by: Sayaka Harada
An outdoor climber who looks up to her father Juzo and has been climbing since she was little.
Asuka Fujimura (藤村あすか, Fujimura Asuka)
Voiced by: Ami Koshimizu
A competitive climber who also works at a climbing shop. She is known as the "Shoemeister".

== Media ==
=== Manga ===
Iwa-Kakeru! Climbing Girls, written and illustrated by Ryūdai Ishizaka, was serialized online via Cygames' Cycomi manga app and website from December 5, 2017, to May 18, 2019. A sequel manga, titled Iwa-Kakeru!! Try a new climbing, was serialized via Cycomi from June 8, 2019, to March 20, 2021.

==== Volumes ====
===== Iwa-Kakeru! Climbing Girls =====
No.	Japanese release date	Japanese ISBN
1	July 30, 2018 (print); April 30, 2020 (digital)	978-4-06-512187-0
2	November 30, 2018 (print); April 30, 2020 (digital)	978-4-06-513678-2
3	April 30, 2020 (digital)	—
4	April 30, 2020 (digital)	—

===== Iwa-Kakeru!! Try a new climbing =====
No.	Japanese release date	Japanese ISBN
1	February 28, 2020 (digital)	—
2	April 30, 2020 (digital)	—
3	August 28, 2020 (digital)	—
4	October 30, 2020 (digital)	—
5	March 30, 2021 (digital)	—
6	May 28, 2021 (digital)	—

=== Anime ===
On April 24, 2020, an anime television series adaptation, titled Iwa-Kakeru! Sport Climbing Girls, was announced. The series was animated by Blade and directed by Tetsurō Amino, with Touko Machida handling series composition, Yoshihiro Watanabe designing the characters, and Tsubasa Ito composing the series' music. It aired from October 4 to December 20, 2020, on ABC and TV Asahi's brand new Animazing!!! programming block. (Note: ABC and TV Asahi listed the series premiere at 26:00 on October 3, 2020, which is effectively October 4 at 2:00 a.m. JST.) Aina Suzuki performed the opening theme "Motto Takaku" (もっと高く; "Even Higher"), while Sumire Uesaka, Yui Ishikawa, Aina Suzuki, and Miyu Tomita performed the ending "LET'S CLIMB↑" as their respective characters.

Crunchyroll streamed the series in North America, Central America, South America, Europe, Africa, Oceania, the Middle East, and CIS. The series is licensed by Medialink in South and Southeast Asia.

In May 2025, it was announced that Anime Limited picked up the home video rights for the series in the United States.

==== Episodes ====
No.	Title (Note: All English titles are taken from Crunchyroll.)	Directed by	Written by	Original release date
1	"Rocky Puzzle"; Transliteration: "Iwa no Pazuru" (Japanese: 岩のパズル)	Tomohiro Matsukawa	Touko Machida	October 4, 2020
First-year student Konomi Kasahara tries to find a mostly casual club to join when she comes across a rock climbing wall. Jun Uehara, a young prodigy climber, convinces her to try climbing, and Konomi quickly gets interested, using her puzzle solving skills to find ideal routes to the top. Jun is insulted by Konomi's carefree attitude and challenges her to a race to stay in the club. Even with a handicap, Konomi just barely loses to Jun, but Jun lets her stay in the club. Sayo Yotsuba then tells the assembled club members that they are going to a local youth climbing competition the next day.
2	"Believe in Yourself"; Transliteration: "Jibun o Shinjite" (Japanese: 自分を信じて)	Takahiro Tamano	Konomi Shugo	October 11, 2020
The Hanamiya girls head to the Chiba Spring Climbing Championships where the goal is to solve the problems of the assembled rock climbing sets. Most of the club members manage to pass through the first round while Konomi gets some advice from another girl. However, the advice turns out to be malicious, as Konomi quickly uses up her energy and fails to clear the first stage. The girl is revealed to be Akane Uchimura, the "novice killer," who feels the need to drive new girls out of the sport due to a petty grudge she has against Jun from years prior. Jun gives Konomi some good advice on climbing technique, and Konomi uses it to surpass Akane on the second stage, but her lack of physical strength causes her to fail at the end. The other three members from Hanamiya do well enough that the club wins the tournament.
3	"The Anti-Monkey Rock"; Transliteration: "Mashiragaeshi no Iwa" (Japanese: 猿返しの岩)	Naoki Horiuchi	Gōto Aogiri	October 18, 2020
The Hanamiya girls decide to train Konomi to improve her physicality so she can tackle tougher problems. Konomi struggles to keep up with her peers, while Jun struggles to be friendly with her at school. Later, the girls head to a more rural area to do some bouldering with the infamous "Anti-Monkey Rock" that is difficult to climb. Konomi arrives way too early, and ends up beating a grey-haired girl in a puzzle game, impressing her. The Hanamiya girls hike to their destination, where they meet their unofficial mentor Juzo Goto and his daughter Kikuko, the same girl Konomi met earlier. Konomi mentally charts out an ideal bouldering route, but the unmarked rocks make her scared of falling and she cannot finish. Kikuko then climbs a difficult route on her own, proclaiming her wish to surpass her own father as a climber.
4	"Powerhouse Climbers"; Transliteration: "Kyōgō Kuraimā" (Japanese: 強豪クライマー)	Tomohiro Matsukawa	Masahiro Yokotani	October 25, 2020
Over a month later, Konomi goes back to the Anti-Monkey Rock with the rest of her club to show off the results of her daily training. Finally conquering her fear, she solves the problem. Konomi then begs Kikuko to come cheer her at the Kanto Bouldering Championship until she relents. Back in town, the Hanamiya girls visit a climbing goods store where the proprietor, Asuka Fujimura, measures Konomi for climbing shoes. Afterward, the Hanamiya girls reunite at the Kanto Bouldering Championship, where they meet their rivals from other schools and a girl from Konomi's past named Kurea Ooba, who sees her as a rival from their ballet class.
5	"Hard Work and Talent"; Transliteration: "Doryoku to Tenpu" (Japanese: 努力と天賦)	Daisuke Tsukushi	Konomi Shugo	November 1, 2020
Nonoka reminisces how meeting Sayo inspired her love of climbing. Back in the present, the Hanamiya girls and their rivals are at the Kanto Bouldering Championship. During the competition, the captains of the rival teams use their respective strengths while they are climbing. When it is the Hanamiya girls' turn, Sayo, Konomi, and Jun do well. However, Nonoka's height prevents her from reaching the top. Once the preliminaries are over with, it is revealed that while Sayo, Konomi, and Jun have moved on the semifinals, Nonoka misses the cut. Afterward, Sayo comforts a distraught Nonoka. Secretly listening to their conversation, a determined Konomi and Jun head back inside.
6	"Unbelievable Ability"; Transliteration: "Shinjirarenai Chikara" (Japanese: 信じられない力)	Takahiro Tamano	Gōto Aogiri	November 8, 2020
While she is alone, Masumi Fujita questions her ability to compete. Meanwhile, Nonoka decides to cheer on Konomi, Jun, and Sayo. Inside, Konomi notices some of their rivals are training when Kurea approaches her. Afterward, the semifinals commences. In the stands, Asuka reveals to Nonoka that she helped set up the routes. Konomi goes first and she uses her analytic skills to send Problem A in one-shot. Maruno Satō goes next, but she runs out of time. When Konomi takes on Problem B, she is able to send it in one-shot as well. While this is happening, Kaoru Niijima takes on Problem A and she shows why she is known as "Zombie Niijima" as she climbs higher and higher with each attempt. In the back, Jun tells Konomi to take a break. Later, Kurea takes on Problem A, Kaoru takes on Problem B, and Konomi takes on Problem C. Just like the first two problems, Konomi sends Problem C in one-shot. Meanwhile, both Kaoru and Kurea run out of time.
7	"Failure of a Climber"; Transliteration: "Kuraimā Shikkaku" (Japanese: クライマー失格)	Yasuo Ejima	Masahiro Yokotani	November 15, 2020
Jun recalls how she was loner thanks to her love of climbing. At the Kanto Bouldering Championship, Konomi attempts to use her analytic skills to solve Problem D. However, she is unable to do so, which results in her running out of time. Meanwhile, the other competitors struggle during their climbs. It is soon realized that the reason for this is that their inability to match Konomi's feat has cause them to panic. Later, Kurea takes on Problem D, while Jun takes on Problem A. Accepting that Konomi is better than her, Kurea decides to do just enough to relay a message to her teammates. Jun meanwhile fails to send the first three problems. As she is struggling with Problem D, Jun remembers how she loved climbing so much that she even drove away her friend Haruna when she thought Haruna was not taking it seriously. Jun ultimately ends up not sending any problems. In the back, Konomi tries to comfort Jun, but Jun ignores her. While she is alone, Jun becomes distraught over her failure.
8	"Tears of Disappointment"; Transliteration: "Afureru Kuyashi Namida" (Japanese: あふれる悔し涙)	Naoki Hishikawa	Konomi Shugo	November 22, 2020
Sayo injures her middle finger during the semifinals. When she takes on Problem D, she gets the crowd to rally behind her, which motivates her to send it. Once the semifinals are over with, it is revealed that Konomi and Sayo have reached the finals. However, Nonoka convinces Sayo to withdraw due to her injury. In the back, Konomi is approached by Chinari. Meanwhile, Masumi again questions her ability to compete until her teammates cheer her up. In the finals, Masumi successfully sends the problem. When it is Konomi's turn, she ends up falling down. At the awards ceremony, it is announced that Masumi won the individual championship, while Kurikawa High won the team championship. Following the conclusion of the Kanto Bouldering Championship, Sayo reveals to Konomi that Jun has decided to train on her own for a while. She also reveals that the Combined Japan High School Cup will be held in six months and she wants everyone to train in order to overcome their weaknesses.
9	"The Princess of Climbing"; Transliteration: "Kuraimingu Purinsesu" (Japanese: クライミングプリンセス)	Norihiko Nagahama	Gōto Aogiri	November 29, 2020
Sayo and Nonoka congratulate Konomi for overcoming her weakness by entering in multiple competitions. Shortly thereafter, Anne Kurusu arrives and she announces that she will have an exhibition match with Konomi, which she easily wins, showing why she is known as the "Princess of Climbing". Afterward, Anne tells Konomi that the Hanamiya girls have no shot at beating her team during the Combined Cup. This causes Konomi to vow that she will beat Anne. When Konomi meets back up with Sayo and Nonoka, Sayo suggests that Konomi approach Jun to be their speed climbing coach. Meanwhile, Jun and Akane are working at a gym. While they are teaching a class, Akane realizes that Jun cannot climb. Konomi later runs into Jun and they have a conversation where Konomi asks Jun to help her. When Jun refuses, Akane challenges her to a match. When it is Jun's turn, Akane gives Jun some encouraging words, which helps her overcome her inability to climb.
10	"Restart!"; Transliteration: "Resutāto!" (Japanese: Reスタート！)	Takahiro Tamano	Masahiro Yokotani	December 6, 2020
The Hanamiya girls meet up at a speed wall for their speed climbing training. After Jun explains the rules of speed climbing to Konomi, she completes the climb where she learns that she needs to analyze the nitty-gritty before she can improve her time. Sayo later tells Konomi about a multi-school speed training camp. Konomi and Jun arrive at the camp where they encounter Akane, Kurea, and Maruno. They then meet the organizer of the camp, Nakata, who explains that he came up with it in order to help first-years. When Konomi post a disappointing time, Nakata tells her that she can pick up new ideas by watching the other climbers. Konomi decides to use her analytic skills to study Maruno and Kurea. Despite this, however, she post an even worse time. Kurea later confronts a distraught Konomi, revealing that Konomi inspired her to do better as she wants to beat her at her best. This is followed by Konomi and Jun having a conversation. The next day, Konomi notices another climber who post a very impressive time.
11	"The 15 Second Wall"; Transliteration: "15-byō no Kabe" (Japanese: 15秒の壁)	Naoki Horiuchi	Touko Machida	December 13, 2020
Konomi approaches the climber to ask what she focuses on while she is climbing. The climber, whose name is Mimu Takahashi, explains that she focuses on rhythm games. Inspired, Konomi uses her analytic skills to train. The next day, Konomi takes on Kurea in a race. While Kurea ultimately wins, Konomi post her best time yet. When she thanks Mimu for her advice, Konomi discovers that Mimu is one of Anne's teammates. When the Hanamiya girls reunite, it revealed that Kikuko will help them prepare for the Combined Cup. It is also revealed that Sayo has been pushing through her injured finger. As such, Nonoka convinces her to withdraw. On the day of the Combined Cup, the Hanamiya girls are placed in Group B and they are announced as the first place team of the bouldering preliminaries. They then move onto the speed preliminaries where Konomi beats Maruno.
12	"The Road to Best in Japan"; Transliteration: "Zenichi e no Michi" (Japanese: 全一への道)	Tomohiro Matsukawa	Touko Machida	December 20, 2020
Anne breezes through the preliminaries. Meanwhile, Jun easily wins her race during the speed preliminaries. Once the preliminaries are over with, it is revealed that the Hanamiya girls have made it to the finals. However, they notice that they are second in the team rankings behind Anne's team. In the back, Anne is confident the Hanamiya girls will not beat her. Anne then proceeds to taunt Konomi before and after their race during the speed portion of the finals. Anne later takes first place in the bouldering portion. During the lead portion, Anne and her teammates are unable to send the route. Despite this, however, they are still in first place. When it is the Hanamiya girls' turn, Jun and Nonoka are unable to send the route as well. Konomi goes last and she successfully sends it. As a result, the Hanamiya girls win the competition.

=== Stage play ===
A stage play of the series performed by the idol group AKB48 ran at the Sunshine Theatre in Tokyo from February 17 to February 20, 2022.

== Reception ==
=== Previews ===
The anime series' first episode garnered mixed reviews from Anime News Network's staff during the Fall 2020 season previews. James Beckett was critical of the lack of excitement in the subject of rock climbing, characters with "functional" personalities and "terribly cheap" animation that fails to display the girls' athleticism. Nicholas Dupree commended the premiere for being "a decent ambassador" that covers its subject matter and narrative points serviceably well, but criticized Jun and Konomi's character writing and the "below average" production quality for having unappealing climbing visuals. Theron Martin and Rebecca Silverman gave similar praise to Konomi's puzzle game approach to the sport and the muscular designs of the girls' physique, with the former pointing out the "disappointingly limited" animation and "suggestive" camera angles in the rock climbing scenes and the latter being critical of Jun's unwelcoming presence. The fifth reviewer, Caitlin Moore, was critical of the use of "leering camera angles" during the climbing scenes and the characters of Konomi and Jun stretching credibility in their approach to the sport, but felt immediately hooked into the subject matter it displayed, concluding that: "Iwa-Kakeru! -Sport Climbing Girls- isn't particularly great and I doubt it'll have staying power of any kind, but it scratches a very specific itch I've had for a while."

=== Series ===
Moore reviewed the complete anime series in 2021 and gave it a C+ grade. While commending the vast information about rock climbing throughout the episodes and the production having "bright candy-colors and consistently on-model animation", she criticized the "suspension of disbelief" and lack of "realistic safety measures" during the rock climbing scenes, the annoyance of the secondary characters and the "fan service-driven storyboarding" that diminished the girls' athletic abilities, concluding that: "Iwa-Kakeru! is a perfectly middling anime, with a sport I enjoyed learning about, decent production values, a main cast I have no strong feelings about whatsoever, and a secondary cast that I wouldn't mind seeing cast into a pit of acid. It was made to capture a moment, but is doomed to be forgotten before that moment comes to pass, if it ever does at all." Tim Jones and Stig Høgset of THEM Anime Reviews were highly critical of the series' "piss-poor presentation, the obnoxious rivals, and the sports cliches" throughout the episodes, Konomi's character arc having unearned victories and overshadowing her other club members, and coming to an abrupt ending following a tournament, concluding that: "Whatever this show had going for it ended the second the announcers came into play. Really poor animation and terrible side characters were just icing on the crap cake after that."

== See also ==
- Love Flops, an anime television series whose manga adaptation was illustrated by Ryūdai Ishizaka
