= Mikako Komatsu =

Japanese voice actress

- 小松 未可子
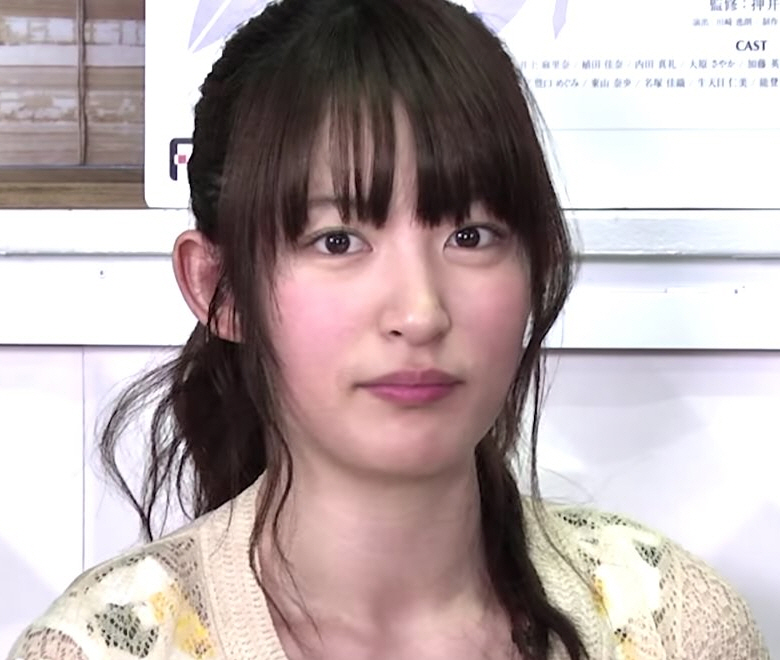
- Komatsu in May 2016
- Born: 11 November 1988 (age 37); Kuwana, Mie, Japan
- Education: Otsuma Women's University
- Occupations: Voice actress; singer
- Years active: 2007–present
- Agent: Hirata Office
- Notable credits: Heroman as Joey; Yashahime as Setsuna; Blue Reflection as Shihori Sugamoto; Star Twinkle PreCure as Madoka Kaguya / Cure Selene; Magia Record as Momoko Togame; Jujutsu Kaisen as Maki Zen'in; Dragon Quest: The Adventure of Dai as Maam; Edens Zero as Rebecca Bluegarden; Don't Toy with Me, Miss Nagatoro as Gamo; Genshin Impact as Mavuika
- Height: 160 cm (5 ft 3 in)
- Spouse: Tomoaki Maeno (m. 2020)
- Children: 2
- Musical career
- Genres: J-pop; anime song
- Instrument: Vocals
- Years active: 2012–present
- Labels: King Records; Toy's Factory
- Website: www.mikakokomatsu.jp/sp/

Mikako Komatsu (小松 未可子, Komatsu Mikako; born 11 November 1988) is a Japanese voice actress and singer.

== Career ==
Komatsu passed an audition held at the first corner of Nippon Broadcasting System's "Takashi Fujii's All Night Nippon R". A member of "Younger Sister", she left the group in September 2007. She worked at Hirata Office in November 2009 and made her first leading role for the anime series Heroman.

On 25 April 2012, she made her debut as a singer with the ending theme song "Black Holy" from Starchild, which was used for Bodacious Space Pirates. On 7 November 2012, the second single "Cold Room, Alone / Summer Solstice Fruit" was released. It was used for the series "K" and is produced by angela, a senior of Starchild. On 10 November 2013, she performed "Beyond the Emerald Hill", which she wrote, composed, and arranged. On 25 August 2014, she met Mai Kuraki, who admired her, in "Listen? ~ Live 4 Life ~". On 14 February 2015, she sang "Tonight, I feel close to you" with Mai Kuraki in "My Music" broadcast on that day, and played a duet co-star. On 29 September 2015, the broadcast of "A & G Next Generation Lady Go !!" ended, after 2010.

On 19 July 2016, she announced that would transfer her label to Toy's Factory and receive full-scale production of Q-MHz. Komatsu won the Best Supporting Actress Award at the 16th Seiyu Awards.

== Personal life ==
Komatsu passed Level 2 on the English Proficiency Test.

On 12 May 2020, Komatsu announced through her agency that she married fellow voice actor Tomoaki Maeno. On 17 August 2022, she and Maeno announced that they were expecting their first child. On 15 January 2023, she gave birth to their first child. In 18 September 2024, she announced on her official Instagram that she is expecting their second child and is due around winter next year. On 14 February 2025, they welcomed their second child.

== Filmography ==
=== Anime series ===
| Year | Title | Role | Notes |
|---|---|---|---|
| 2010 | Heroman | Joseph Carter "Joey" Jones | |
| 2011 | Gosick | Ian Musgrave | Episodes 13, 15 |
| 2011 | Hanasaku Iroha | Shiho, Students A, D and F | |
| 2011 | Yu-Gi-Oh! Zexal | Kotori Mizuki | |
| 2012 | Bodacious Space Pirates | Marika Kato | |
| 2012 | Girls und Panzer | Saki Maruyama | |
| 2012 | K | Neko | |
| 2012 | Natsuiro Kiseki | Keita | |
| 2012 | Senki Zesshō Symphogear | Kuriyo Andō | |
| 2012 | Tari Tari | Jan | Episodes 5, 9, 13 |
| 2012 | The Ambition of Oda Nobuna | Naotaka Magara | Episodes 10–12 |
| 2012 | Yu-Gi-Oh! Zexal II | Kotori Mizuki | |
| 2013 | Gundam Build Fighters | Sei Iori | |
| 2013 | My Teen Romantic Comedy SNAFU | Saika Totsuka | |
| 2013 | Nagi-Asu: A Lull in the Sea | Miuna Shiodome | |
| 2013 | Pretty Rhythm: Rainbow Live | Ito Suzuno | |
| 2013 | Senki Zesshō Symphogear G | Kuriyo Ando, Female Student | |
| 2013 | Space Battleship Yamato 2199 | Aiko Tokugawa, Jiro Shima | |
| 2013 | Sunday Without God | Ulla Euleus Hecmatika | Episode 5, 6 |
| 2013 | Yozakura Quartet | Boy, Kyōsuke (young) | Episode 1, 6 |
| 2014 | Akame ga Kill! | Sayo | |
| 2014 | Aldnoah.Zero | Amifumi Inko | |
| 2014 | Blue Spring Ride | Shūko Murao | |
| 2014 | Celestial Method | Shione Togawa | |
| 2014 | Hozuki's Coolheadedness | Sakuya | |
| 2014 | Magica Wars | Suzuka Kamiki | |
| 2014 | Momo Kyun Sword | Kaguya | |
| 2014 | Nisekoi | Seishiro Tsugumi | |
| 2014 | Soul Eater Not! | Eternal Feather | |
| 2014 | Pokémon X and Y Special: The Strongest Mega Evolution | Manon/Mairin | |
| 2014 | Wizard Barristers | Mayu Saotome | Episode 3, 8 |
| 2014 | Wolf Girl and Black Prince | Aki Tezuka | |
| 2015 | Aldnoah.Zero Season 2 | Amifumi Inko | |
| 2015 | Aoharu x Machinegun | Hotaru Tachibana | |
| 2015 | Danchigai | Yayoi Nakano | |
| 2015 | Gangsta. | Ginger | |
| 2015 | Gourmet Girl Graffiti | Shiina | |
| 2015 | K: Return of Kings | Neko | |
| 2015 | Maria the Virgin Witch | Priapos | |
| 2015 | My Teen Romantic Comedy SNAFU TOO! | Saika Totsuka | |
| 2015 | Nisekoi: | Seishiro Tsugumi, Tsugumyā | |
| 2015 | Overlord | Lupusregina Beta | |
| 2015 | Plastic Memories | Andie | |
| 2015 | Tesagure! Bukatsumono Spin-off Purupurun Sharumu to Asobou | Hina Usami | |
| 2015 | Senki Zesshō Symphogear GX | Kuriyo Ando | |
| 2015 | Ushio and Tora | Asako Nakamura | |
| 2016 | Ajin: Demi-Human | Izumi Shimomura | |
| 2016 | BBK/BRNK | Shizuru Taneomi | |
| 2016 | ClassicaLoid | Kanae Otowa | |
| 2016 | Food Wars! Shokugeki no Soma: The Second Plate | Taki Tsunozaki | |
| 2016 | Grimgar of Fantasy and Ash | Yume | |
| 2016 | Miss Bernard said. | Shiori Kanbayashi | |
| 2016 | Snow White with the Red Hair 2nd Season | Eugena Shenazard | |
| 2016 | Taboo Tattoo | Bluesy "Izzy" Fluesy | |
| 2016 | Tales of Zestiria the X | Rose | |
| 2016 | This Art Club Has a Problem! | Shizuka | |
| 2016 | Ushio and Tora 2nd Season | Asako Nakamura | |
| 2017 | Atom: The Beginning | Motoko Tsutsumi | |
| 2017 | Children of the Whales | Ginshu | |
| 2017 | ClassicaLoid Season 2 | Kanae Otowa | |
| 2017 | Classroom of the Elite | Mio Ibuki | |
| 2017 | Descending Stories: Showa Genroku Rakugo Shinju Season 2 | Shinnosuke | |
| 2017 | Eromanga Sensei | Ayame Kagurazaka | |
| 2017 | Fuuka | Sara Iwami | |
| 2017 | Hand Shakers | Kodama | |
| 2017 | Is It Wrong to Try to Pick Up Girls in a Dungeon?: Sword Oratoria | Fels | |
| 2017 | Land of the Lustrous | Cinnabar | |
| 2017 | Nyanko Days | Rou | |
| 2017 | Re:Creators | Selesia Upitiria, herself | |
| 2017 | Sakura Quest | Sanae Kōzuki | |
| 2017 | Tales of Zestiria the X Season 2 | Rose | |
| 2018 | Angolmois: Record of Mongol Invasion | Kano | |
| 2018 | A Place Further than the Universe | Hanami Yasumoto | |
| 2018 | Bloom into You | Rei Koito | |
| 2018 | Hanebado! | Miyako Tarōmaru | |
| 2018 | Hinamatsuri | Sayo Aizawa | Episode 5, 7–9 |
| 2018 | Hinomaru Sumo | Reina Gojō | |
| 2018 | Pop Team Epic | Popuko | Episode 3a |
| 2018 | Tachibanakan To Lie Angle | Yū Tsukishiro | |
| 2018 | Takunomi | Kae Midorikawa | |
| 2018 | Tsukumogami Kashimasu | Okō | |
| 2018 | Yuuna and the Haunted Hot Springs | Oboro Shintō | |
| 2018 | Zoids Wild | Penne | |
| 2019 | Kaguya-sama: Love Is War | Toyomi Fujiwara | |
| 2019 | Demon Slayer: Kimetsu no Yaiba | Susamaru | |
| 2019 | Fairy Gone | Eleanor Need | |
| 2019 | Kandagawa Jet Girls | Yamada | |
| 2019 | Kemurikusa | Rin | |
| 2019 | Revisions | Milo | |
| 2019 | Star Twinkle PreCure | Madoka Kaguya / Cure Selene | |
| 2019 | Yatogame-chan Kansatsu Nikki | Yanna Sasatsu | |
| 2020 | Arte | Arte | |
| 2020 | Dragon Quest: The Adventure of Dai | Maam | |
| 2020 | Iwa-Kakeru! -Sport Climbing Girls- | Chinari Iwamine | |
| 2020 | Jujutsu Kaisen | Maki Zen'in | |
| 2020 | Keep Your Hands Off Eizouken! | Sowande Sakaki | |
| 2020 | Magia Record: Puella Magi Madoka Magica Side Story | Momoko Togame | |
| 2020 | Re:Zero − Starting Life in Another World | Minerva | |
| 2020 | The 8th Son? Are You Kidding Me? | Iina | |
| 2020 | Warlords of Sigrdrifa | Lizbet Crown | |
| 2020 | Yashahime | Setsuna | |
| 2020 | Yatogame-chan Kansatsu Nikki 2 Satsume | Yanna Sasatsu | |
| 2021 | Back Arrow | Prax Conrad | |
| 2021 | Don't Toy with Me, Miss Nagatoro | Gamo | |
| 2021 | Doraemon | Alien 2 from Dorayaki Planet | |
| 2021 | Edens Zero | Rebecca Bluegarden | |
| 2021 | Ex-Arm | Minami Uezono | |
| 2021 | Farewell, My Dear Cramer | Nanami Zaisen | |
| 2021 | Irina: The Vampire Cosmonaut | Roza Plevitskaya | |
| 2021 | Kageki Shojo!! | Risa Nakayama | |
| 2021 | Magia Record: Puella Magi Madoka Magica Side Story – Eve of Awakening | Momoko Togame | |
| 2021 | Mazica Party | Kezuru | |
| 2021 | PuraOre! Pride of Orange | Yōko Matsunaga | |
| 2021 | The Aquatope on White Sand | Kaoru Shimabukuro | |
| 2021 | The Great Jahy Will Not Be Defeated! | Saurva | |
| 2021 | Vivy: Fluorite Eye's Song | Osamu Matsumoto (Young) | Episode 10 |
| 2021 | Yatogame-chan Kansatsu Nikki 3 Satsume | Yanna Sasatsu | |
| 2022 | Aoashi | Aoi Kaneko | |
| 2022 | Classroom of the Elite 2nd Season | Mio Ibuki | |
| 2022 | Fuuto PI | Akiko Narumi | |
| 2022 | Girls' Frontline | Gentiane | |
| 2022 | Love All Play | Hana Sakurai | |
| 2022 | Luminous Witches | Grace Maitland Steward | |
| 2022 | Magia Record: Puella Magi Madoka Magica Side Story – Dawn of a Shallow Dream | Momoko Togame | |
| 2022 | Prima Doll | Yūgiri | |
| 2022 | Princess Connect! Re:Dive Season 2 | Makoto | |
| 2022 | PuniRunes | Enerune | |
| 2022 | Romantic Killer | Riri/Rio | Episodes 1–12 |
| 2022 | Shine Post | Yūki Hinase | |
| 2022 | The Case Study of Vanitas | Mikhail | |
| 2022 | The Eminence in Shadow | Beatrix | |
| 2022 | The Maid I Hired Recently Is Mysterious | Fujisaki | |
| 2022 | Uncle from Another World | Sumika Fujimiya | |
| 2022 | Yatogame-chan Kansatsu Nikki 4 Satsume | Yanna Sasatsu | |
| 2023 | Chronicles of an Aristocrat Reborn in Another World | Lefane von Dalstein | |
| 2023 | Don't Toy with Me, Miss Nagatoro 2nd Attack | Gamo-chan | |
| 2023 | Helck | Vermilio | |
| 2023 | Jujutsu Kaisen Season 2 | Maki Zenin | |
| 2023 | KamiKatsu | Rishu | |
| 2023 | My Tiny Senpai | Yutaka Shinozaki | |
| 2023 | Ningen Fushin: Adventurers Who Don't Believe in Humanity Will Save the World | Kizuna | |
| 2023 | The Dreaming Boy Is a Realist | Kaede Sajō | |
| 2023 | Tokyo Revengers: Christmas Showdown | Yuzuha Shiba | |
| 2024 | Classroom of the Elite 3rd Season | Mio Ibuki | |
| 2024 | How I Attended an All-Guy's Mixer | Suo | |
| 2024 | Kagaku×Bōken Survival | Daiya | |
| 2024 | Tales of Wedding Rings | Amber | |
| 2024 | The Stories of Girls Who Couldn't Be Magicians | Kai Mirai | |
| 2024 | The Unwanted Undead Adventurer | Lorrane Vivie | |
| 2024 | Whisper Me a Love Song | Aki Mizuguchi | |
| 2025 | City the Animation | Midori Nagumo | |
| 2025 | Farmagia | Nares | |
| 2025 | I'm the Evil Lord of an Intergalactic Empire! | Christiana Leta Rosebreia | |
| 2025 | Milky Subway: The Galactic Limited Express | Ryoko Kanzaki | |
| 2025 | The Unaware Atelier Master | Kurt | |
| 2025 | Umamusume: Cinderella Gray | Face No More | |
| 2025 | Witch Watch | Yūri Makuwa | |
| 2026 | Hello, I am a Witch, and My Crush Wants Me to Make a Love Potion! | Rose | |
| 2026 | Jujutsu Kaisen Season 3 | Maki Zenin | |
| 2027 | The Kept Man of the Princess Knight | Arwin | |

=== Anime films ===
| Year | Title | Role |
|---|---|---|
| 2011 | Towa no Quon | Yūma |
| 2013 | The Garden of Words | Aizawa |
| 2014 | Bodacious Space Pirates: Abyss of Hyperspace | Marika Kato |
| 2014 | K: Missing Kings | Neko |
| 2014 | Pretty Rhythm All-Star Selection: Prism Show☆Best Ten | Ito Suzuno |
| 2015 | Ajin Part 1: Shōdō | Izumi Shimomura |
| 2015 | Girls und Panzer der Film | Saki Maruyama |
| 2016 | Ajin Part 2: Shōtotsu | Izumi Shimomura |
| 2016 | Ajin Part 3: Shōgeki | Izumi Shimomura |
| 2018 | Okko's Inn | Akane Kanda |
| 2019 | Star Twinkle Pretty Cure the Movie: These Feeling within The Song of Stars | Madoka Kaguya/Cure Selene |
| 2020 | Fate/Grand Order: Camelot – Wandering; Agaterám | Xuanzang Sanzang |
| 2020 | Happy-Go-Lucky Days | Aya-san |
| 2021 | Sing a Bit of Harmony | Aya |
| 2021 | Jujutsu Kaisen 0 | Maki Zen'in |
| 2022 | Blue Thermal | Chizuru Yano |
| 2022 | The Seven Deadly Sins: Grudge of Edinburgh | Tristan (young) |
| 2024 | Fuuto PI: The Portrait of Kamen Rider Skull | Akiko Narumi |

=== Original net animation ===
- Gundam Build Fighters: GM's Counterattack (2017) – Sei Iori
- 7 Seeds (2019–2020) – Akane Nashimoto
- Romantic Killer (2022) – Riri
- Sand Land: The Series (2024) – Anne
- Cat's Eye (2025) – Hitomi Kisugi
- Yu-Gi-Oh! Card Game The Chronicles (2025) – Aussa

=== Motion comic ===
- Splatoon – Goggles / Bobble Hat

=== Video games ===
| Year | Title | Role |
|---|---|---|
| 2013 | Hyperdimension Neptunia Victory | Tekken-chan |
| 2013 | Super Robot Wars UX | Joseph "Joey" Carter Jones |
| 2013 | Yu-Gi-Oh! Zexal: Gekitotsu! Duel Carnival | Kotori Mizuki |
| 2015 | Dragon Quest: Heroes | Giulietta |
| 2015 | Kantai Collection | Akitsushima, Teruzuki |
| 2015 | Tales of Zestiria | Rosé |
| 2015 | Yu-Gi-Oh! ARC-V:Tag Force Special | Kotori Mizuki |
| 2016 | Hyrule Warriors Legends | Linkle |
| 2016 | Fate/Grand Order | Xuanzang, Caenis/Lancer, Valkyrie Hildr |
| 2017 | Danganronpa V3: Killing Harmony | Tsumugi Shirogane |
| 2017 | Azur Lane | Gascogne, Sims |
| 2017 | Blue Reflection | Shihori Sugamoto |
| 2017 | Radiant Historia: Perfect Chronology | Nemesia |
| 2017 | Super Bomberman R | Pink Bomber |
| 2017 | Million Arthur: Arcana Blood | Riesz |
| 2017 | Magia Record: Puella Magi Madoka Magica Side Story | Momoko Togame |
| 2018 | League of Legends | Akali |
| 2018 | Princess Connect! Re:Dive | Makoto / Makoto Aki |
| 2019 | Ys IX: Monstrum Nox | Krysha Pendleton / White Cat |
| 2020 | Trials of Mana | Riesz |
| 2020 | The Seven Deadly Sins: Grand Cross | Roxy |
| 2021 | Cookie Run: Kingdom | Chili Pepper Cookie |
| 2021 | Counter:Side | Shiroko (Eujin) |
| 2022 | Tribe Nine | Yui Kamiki |
| 2022 | Eve: Ghost Enemies | Wraith |
| 2022 | The King of Fighters XV | B. Jenet |
| 2022 | Goddess of Victory: Nikke | Centi |
| 2023 | 404 Game Re:set | Thunder Blade |
| 2023 | Blue Archive | Kikyou Kiryuu |
| 2024 | Jujutsu Kaisen: Cursed Clash | Maki Zen'in |
| 2024 | Genshin Impact | Mavuika |
| 2024 | Honkai: Star Rail | Feixiao |
| 2024 | Wizardry Variants Daphne | Abenius |
| 2025 | Atelier Yumia: The Alchemist of Memories & the Envisioned Land | Nina Friede |
| 2025 | Fatal Fury: City of the Wolves | B. Jenet |
| 2026 | Arknights: Endfield | Ember |

=== Dubbing ===
==== Live-action ====
- Backrooms as Dr. Mary Kline
- Crisis on Earth-X as Supergirl (Kara Zor-El)
- Dr. Jin as Hong Young-rae / Yoo Mi-na
- Extinction as Lu
- Forbidden Games (New Era Movies edition) as Michel Dollé
- The Gifted as Lauren Strucker
- Humans as Matilda "Mattie" Hawkins
- Independence Day: Resurgence as Rain Lao
- Insidious: Chapter 3 as Quinn Brenner
- Journey to the West: The Demons Strike Back as White Bone Spirit
- The Killing Kind as Ingrid Lewis
- Kingdom of the Planet of the Apes as Mae / Nova
- The Lost Symbol as Katherine Solomon
- Mirror Mirror as Snow White
- Moon Knight as Layla El-Faouly / Scarlet Scarab
- Pee Mak as Nak
- Secret Door as Seo Ji-dam
- Snakehead Swamp as Ashley
- Supergirl as Supergirl (Kara Zor-El)

==== Animation ====
- Bravest Warriors as Beth

== Discography ==
=== Singles ===
- "Baby DayZ"
- "HEARTRAIL"
- "Imagine day, Imagine life!"
- "Maybe the next waltz"
