= I Have a Crush at Work =

Japanese manga series

- First tankōbon volume cover, featuring Masugu Tateishi (left) and Yui Mitsuya (right)

この会社に好きな人がいます (Kono Kaisha ni Suki na Hito ga Imasu)
- Genre: Romantic comedy; Slice of life
- Manga
- Written by: Akamaru Enomoto
- Published by: Kodansha
- English publisher: NA: Kodansha USA (digital)
- Imprint: Morning KC
- Magazine: Morning
- Original run: March 7, 2019 – January 26, 2023
- Volumes: 15
- Anime television series
- Directed by: Naoko Takeichi
- Written by: Masahiro Yokotani
- Music by: IM.Lab
- Studio: Blade
- Licensed by: SA/SEA: Medialink
- Original network: Tokyo MX, BS Fuji, SUN
- Original run: January 6, 2025 – March 24, 2025
- Episodes: 12
- icon

I Have a Crush at Work (Japanese: この会社に好きな人がいます, Hepburn: Kono Kaisha ni Suki na Hito ga Imasu), also known as Can You Keep a Secret?, is a Japanese manga series written and illustrated by Akamaru Enomoto. It was serialized in Kodansha's seinen manga magazine Morning from March 2019 to January 2023, with its chapters collected in fifteen tankōbon volumes. An anime television series adaptation produced by Blade aired from January to March 2025.

== Plot ==
Masugu Tateishi works in the accounting department of Tsuda Confectionery, a sweets manufacturing company. His relationship with Yui Mitsuya—a coworker who joined the company at the same time but works in the planning department—is particularly hostile, to the point that their frequent clashes earn them the office nickname "mortal enemies". In reality, however, the two are deeply attracted to each other, and after a series of twists and turns, they finally become a couple.

Despite their feelings, Yui worries about workplace gossip and the challenges of office romance. To avoid scrutiny, they agree to keep their relationship a secret. Thus begins their covert life as coworkers-turned-lovers, all while maintaining their carefully crafted façade of mutual dislike in the office.

== Characters ==
Masugu Tateishi (立石 真直, Tateishi Masugu)
Voiced by: Seiichiro Yamashita
A 28-year-old employee at Tsuda Confectionery who is secretly in love with Yui, despite giving the appearance that they do not get along. They decide to keep their relationship a secret from their co-workers to avoid suspicion. He works in accounting, which is where he also first fell in love with her. After spending some time with her, he finally confessed his feelings one night after a work party, and they started dating in secret. He is originally from Yamanashi Prefecture, where his family runs a grape farm. By the end of the story, he marries Yui and has a daughter with her, whom they name Tsumugi.
Yui Mitsuya (三ツ谷 結衣, Mitsuya Yui)
Voiced by: Yume Miyamoto
A employee at Tsuda Confectionery who is the same age as Masugu. Although they joined the company at the same time, they originally did not get along as Yui always thought Masugu was annoying and boring, but she later developed feelings for him as they began spending more time together in private. She initially belonged to the planning department but was later transferred to the PR department. At the end of the story, she marries Masugu.
Shizuno Hayakawa (早川 静乃, Hayakawa Shizuno)
Voiced by: Shizuka Itō
Masugu's boss. She is a heavy drinker and was previously in a failed relationship.
Keisuke Somei (染井 恵介, Somei Keisuke)
Voiced by: Reiō Tsuchida
Maria Morizono (森園 まりあ, Morizono Maria)
Voiced by: Yō Taichi
Chiharu Utō (宇藤 千春, Utō Chiharu)
Voiced by: Misaki Watada
Yukiko Sakura (佐倉 ゆき子, Sakura Yukiko)
Voiced by: Sora Tokui
Itsurō Mita (三田 逸郎, Mita Itsurō)
Voiced by: Kentaro Tone
Seiya Suzuki (鈴木 誠也, Suzuki Seiya)
Voiced by: Kensho Ono
Hiromi Kiribayashi (切林 宏海, Kiribayashi Hiromi)
Voiced by: Shin-ichiro Miki

== Production ==
Like Enomoto's previous work, Fumino-san no Bunguna Nichijō, the series focuses on working adults. The series is based on Enomoto's own experiences as a company employee and a suggestion from the editor in charge to focus the series on a workplace romance.

== Media ==
=== Manga ===
Written and illustrated by Akamaru Enomoto, I Have a Crush at Work was serialized in Kodansha's seinen manga magazine Morning from March 7, 2019, to January 26, 2023. Kodansha collected its chapters in fifteen tankōbon volumes, released from July 23, 2019, to March 23, 2023.

The manga has been licensed for English digital release in North America by Kodansha USA.

==== Volumes ====
No.	Original release date	Original ISBN	English release date	English ISBN
1	July 23, 2019	978-4-06-516508-9	February 13, 2024	978-1-63699-662-2
1. "Don't Let Anyone Find Out"; 2. "In the Elevator"; 3. "Monday Morning"; Special #1; 4. "The Times I Don't Want to See You"; 5. "New Rule #1"; 6. "New Rule #2"; Special #2; 7. "Girl Talk"; 8. "Weekend Mode/Work Mode"; 9. "Running into Each Other"
2	December 23, 2019	978-4-06-517997-0	March 12, 2024	979-8-88933-127-8
10. "Drawing a Line"; 11. "Falling in Love"; 12. "The Congress Dances But Does Not Progress"; Special #3; 13. "Source of Strength"; 14. "Trip Planning"; 15. "Tonight is Special"; Special #4; 16. "The Night Before the Trip"; 17. "Our First Trip 1"; 18. "Our First Trip 2"
3	April 23, 2020	978-4-06-519083-8	April 9, 2024	979-8-88933-128-5
19. "Our First Trip 3"; 20. "Swapping Souvenirs and Stories"; 21. "Down in the Dumps"; Special #5; 22. "Shopping"; 23. "Morning Routine"; 24. "Alone in the Storage Room"; Special #6; 25. "The Courage to Take the First Step"; 26. "Alone Time"; 27. "I Can't Slack Off"
4	August 20, 2020	978-4-06-520143-5	June 11, 2024	979-8-88933-256-5
28. "Only I Know"; 29. "What I Love"; 30. "What I Need Now 1"; 31. "What I Need Now 2"; 32. "What I Need Now 3"; 33. "What I Need Now 4"; 34. "Long-distance Date"; 35. "I Can't Not Worry"; 36. "Anniversary 1"; 37. "Anniversary 2"
5	November 20, 2020	978-4-06-521170-0	August 13, 2024	979-8-88933-459-0
38. "Anniversary 3"; 39. "Anniversary 4"; 40. "Going for a Drive"; 41. "I Don't Hate It"; 42. "A Little Stress Relief"; 43. "The Year-End Party"; 44. "The Year-End Party: Extra Innings"; 45. "A Merry Little Christmas"; 46. "What If...?"; 47. "I Wanna Cherish Her"
6	February 22, 2021	978-4-06-522185-3	October 8, 2024	979-8-88933-460-6
48. "Caught in the Act"; 49. "Unexpected"; 50. "Our Valentine's Day 1"; 51. "Our Valentine's Day 2"; 52. "Our Valentine's Day 3"; 53. "Now That I Know"; 54. "Pep Talk"; 55. "Is This a Date?"; 56. "Under My Skin"; 57. "How I Really Feel"
7	May 21, 2021	978-4-06-523193-7	December 10, 2024	979-8-88933-461-3
58. "Fresh Air & Fresh Faces"; 59. "A Desperate Struggle"; 60. "The Starting Line"; 61. "At That Age"; 62. "Let's Go Camping! 1"; 63. "Let's Go Camping! 2"; 64. "Let's Go Camping! 3"; 65. "Love Is Hard for a Director"; 66. "Our First Girl Talk"; 67. "Momzilla 1"
8	August 23, 2021	978-4-06-524901-7	February 11, 2025	979-8-88933-651-8
68. "Momzilla 2"; 69. "Momzilla 3"; 70. "Our Weekend"; 71. "Fever Dream"; 72. "Tsuji-san's Lament"; 73. "Morizono's Affair"; 74. "Internal Transfer?! 1"; 75. "Internal Transfer?! 2"; 76. "Internal Transfer?! 3"; 77. "Internal Transfer?! 4"; Bonus: "Our Own Pace"
9	November 22, 2021	978-4-06-525889-7	April 8, 2025	979-8-88933-652-5
78. "Internal Transfer?! 5"; 79. "My Dream Apartment"; 80. "Picnic Date"; 81. "Complaints"; 82. "Out of the Blue"; 83. "What I Can Do"; 84. "Why Do You Sigh?"; 85. "The Beer Garden Incident 1"; 86. "The Beer Garden Incident 2"; 87. "How to Cure a Bad Mood"
10	February 22, 2022	978-4-06-526718-9	June 10, 2025	979-8-88933-653-2
88. "Unique"; 89. "Visit a Little More"; 90. "The Way You Are"; 91. "Ping-Pong Tournament 1"; 92. "Ping-Pong Tournament 2"; 93. "Our Kinks"; 94. "Ucchan's Mission"; 95. "Going Public"; 96. "Life Plan 1"; 97. "Life Plan 2"
11	May 23, 2022	978-4-06-527764-5	September 9, 2025	979-8-89478-458-8
98. "Life Plan 3"; 99. "Worthy of You"; 100. "Birthday"; 101. "Changing Seasons"; 102. "Unrequited"; 103. "Being a Man"; 104. "Welcome Back"; 105. "Ice Skating Date"; 106. "Christmas at Home"; 107. "Meeting the Parents"
12	August 23, 2022	978-4-06-528634-0	December 9, 2025	979-8-89478-459-5
108. "Meeting the Parents 2"; 109. "A Younger Man"; 110. "I Want to Be Confident"; 111. "Homemade Chocolates"; 112. "A Sweet Day"; 113. "I Have a Nemesis at Home"; 114. "Advice"; 115. "What I Want to Say"; 116. "I Want to Meet You"; 117. "Our New Life"
13	November 22, 2022	978-4-06-529698-1	March 17, 2026	979-8-89478-460-1
14	February 21, 2023	978-4-06-530672-7	June 16, 2026	979-8-89478-461-8
15	March 23, 2023	978-4-06-530878-3	July 14, 2026	979-8-89478-462-5

=== Anime ===
In July 2024, it was announced that the manga will receive an anime television series adaptation. It is produced by Blade and directed by Naoko Takeichi, with scripts written by Masahiro Yokotani, characters designed by Mina Ōsawa, and music composed by IM.Lab. The series aired from January 6 to March 24, 2025, on Tokyo MX and other networks. The opening theme song is "Ano ne" (あのね、), performed by Polkadot Stingray, while the ending theme song is "Futari Jime" (ふたりじめ), performed by Pachae. Medialink licensed the series in South and Southeast Asia for streaming on Ani-One Asia's YouTube channel.

==== Episodes ====
No.	Title	Directed by (Note: Production staff information is taken from the ending credits of each episode.)	Written by	Storyboarded by	Original release date
1	"Don't Let Anyone Find Out"; Transliteration: "Barecha Ikenai" (Japanese: バレちゃいけない)	Naoko Tekeichi	Masahiro Yokotani	Naoko Tekeichi	January 6, 2025
2	"Distinction"; Transliteration: "Kejime" (Japanese: ケジメ)	Ryuta Yamamoto	Masahiro Yokotani	Miyana Okita	January 13, 2025
3	"Tonight is Special"; Transliteration: "Konya wa Tokubetsu" (Japanese: 今夜は特別)	Kazuo Nagami	Sumika Hayakawa	Koji Yoshikawa; Hikaru Takeuchi	January 20, 2025
4	"Hazy Feelings"; Transliteration: "Moyamoya" (Japanese: モヤモヤ)	Michita Shiraishi	Kana Maruyama	Miyana Okita	January 27, 2025
5	"First Trip"; Transliteration: "Hajimete no Ryokō" (Japanese: はじめての旅行)	Tsubasa Obari	Masahiro Yokotani	Miyana Okita	February 3, 2025
6	"What I Need Now"; Transliteration: "Ima, Hitsuyōnamono" (Japanese: いま、必要なもの)	Daisuke Chikushi	Sumika Hayakawa	Daisuke Chikushi	February 10, 2025
7	"Anniversary"; Transliteration: "Kinenbi" (Japanese: 記念日)	Hiromichi Matano	Kana Maruyama	Miyana Okita	February 17, 2025
8	"A Modest Christmas"; Transliteration: "Sasayaka na Kurisumasu" (Japanese: ささやかなクリスマス)	Naoko Takeichi	Yokotani Masahiro	Amino Tetsuro	February 24, 2025
9	"Our Valentine's Day"; Transliteration: "Watashitachi no Barentain" (Japanese: 私たちのバレンタイン)	Kazuo Nogami	Sumika Hayakawa	Miyana Okita	March 3, 2025
10	"True Feelings"; Transliteration: "Honto no Kimochi" (Japanese: ホントの気持ち)	Takahashi Shiho	Kana Maruyama	Miyana Okita	March 10, 2025
11	"Each One's Start"; Transliteration: "Sorezore no Sutāto" (Japanese: それぞれのスタート)	Tsubasa Obari	Masahiro Yokotani	Miyana Okita	March 17, 2025
12	"I Have a Crush at Work"; Transliteration: "Kono Kaisha ni Suki na Hito ga Imasu" (Japanese: この会社に好きな人がいます)	Naoko Tekeichi	Masahiro Yokotani	Naoko Tekeichi	March 24, 2025

== Reception ==
By July 2024, the manga had over 1.1 million copies in circulation (including both physical and digital releases).
