= The Maid I Hired Recently Is Mysterious =

Japanese manga series

- First tankōbon volume cover, featuring Lilith

最近雇ったメイドが怪しい (Saikin Yatotta Meido ga Ayashii)
- Genre: Romantic comedy
- Manga
- Written by: Wakame Konbu
- Published by: Square Enix
- English publisher: NA: Yen Press
- Imprint: Gangan Comics Joker
- Magazine: Monthly Gangan Joker
- Original run: January 22, 2020 – September 21, 2024
- Volumes: 8
- Anime television series
- Directed by: Mirai Minato (Note: Credited as Chief Director (総監督, Sō Kantoku).); Misuzu Hoshino
- Produced by: Hayato Kaneko; Shouta Komatsu; Takumi Itou; Yoshito Hayano; Yutaka Suwa; Daisuke Kobayashi; Yuusuke Tanaka
- Written by: Mirai Minato
- Music by: Kōji Fujimoto; Osamu Sasaki
- Studio: Silver Link; Blade
- Licensed by: Crunchyroll
- Original network: ANN (ABC TV, Nagoya TV, TV Asahi)
- English network: US: Crunchyroll Channel
- Original run: July 24, 2022 – October 9, 2022
- Episodes: 11
- icon

The Maid I Hired Recently Is Mysterious (Japanese: 最近雇ったメイドが怪しい, Hepburn: Saikin Yatotta Meido ga Ayashī), also known as My Recently Hired Maid Is Suspicious, is a Japanese manga series written and illustrated by Wakame Konbu. The series debuted as a webcomic in 2019. It was later serialized in Square Enix's Monthly Gangan Joker magazine from January 2020 to September 2024. The series was compiled into eight tankōbon volumes. An anime television series adaptation by Silver Link and Blade aired from July to October 2022.

== Plot ==
The story follows Yuuri, a boy that lives in a large estate, who is left in the care of his new maid, Lilith, after the death of his parents. Because of Lilith's alluring, secretive, and somewhat mysterious personality, Yuuri finds her extremely suspicious. Yuuri's misunderstandings surrounded by the paranoia over his maid's every move ends up forming a strange bond between them.

== Characters ==
Yuuri (ゆうり, Yūri)
Voiced by: Saori Hayami (Japanese); Macy Anne Johnson (English)
The main male protagonist. A young boy from a rich family, Yuuri lost his parents in a car accident and is taken care by his mysterious new maid Lilith. He is frequently in his father's old office, regardless of his activity. A running gag is Yuuri not realizing he has fallen for Lilith, where he perceives her actions as suspicious while unintentionally revealing his attraction to her, which flusters her and further endears him to her.
Lilith (リリス, Ririsu)
Voiced by: Rie Takahashi (Japanese); Natalie Van Sistine (English)
The main female protagonist. She is a mysterious and beautiful maid with olive skin and sparkling purple eyes. She has two moles under her right eye and a mole on one side of her chest. Having had a connection with Yuuri's parents, she left her previous employer to take care of Yuuri after their deaths. She often tries to tease Yuuri, only to be embarrassed herself due to the latter's unintentional confessions of attraction for her. Lilith's age is never stated, but she is a teenager.
Tsukasa Gojouin (五条院 つかさ, Gojōin Tsukasa)
Voiced by: Yui Horie (Japanese); Kelsey Maher (English)
A young rich girl and classmate of Yuuri. A fan of romance manga and novels, she supports and fantasizes about the "forbidden relationship" between Yuuri and his maid. It takes her two blunt explanations to Yuuri to convince him that he does indeed love Lilith.
Fujisaki (藤崎)
Voiced by: Mikako Komatsu (Japanese); Corey Pettit (English)
Tsukasa's female butler, who was Lilith's classmate in boarding school. She constantly deals with Tsukasa's love of romance fiction, much to her chagrin. She regularly threatens to quit when Tsukasa tries to get her to dress in feminine clothes.
Natsume Nakashima (中島 ナツメ, Nakashima Natsume)
Voiced by: Miyu Tomita (Japanese); Kristi Rothrock (English)
Another maid and former colleague of Lilith's, who tries to bring her back to her former employer. She also harbors romantic feelings towards Lilith.

== Media ==
=== Manga ===
Written and illustrated by Wakame Konbu, The Maid I Hired Recently Is Mysterious debuted as a webcomic in 2019 before it began serialization in Square Enix's shōnen manga magazine Monthly Gangan Joker on January 22, 2020. The series ended serialization on September 21, 2024. It was compiled into eight tankōbon volumes. In North America, Yen Press has licensed the series for English publication.

==== Volumes ====
No.	Original release date	Original ISBN	English release date	English ISBN
1	April 22, 2020	978-4-7575-6618-7	July 13, 2021	978-1-9753-2476-6
2	August 21, 2020	978-4-7575-6805-1	January 25, 2022	978-1-9753-2478-0
3	January 22, 2021	978-4-7575-7043-6	June 28, 2022	978-1-9753-4464-1
4	July 20, 2021	978-4-7575-7230-0	November 22, 2022	978-1-9753-4741-3
5	February 22, 2022	978-4-7575-7603-2	May 23, 2023	978-1-9753-6133-4
6	September 22, 2022	978-4-7575-8149-4	August 22, 2023	978-1-9753-7199-9
7	July 22, 2023	978-4-7575-8679-6	September 17, 2024	979-8-8554-0239-1
8	November 21, 2024	978-4-7575-9521-7; 978-4-7575-9522-4 (SE)	December 16, 2025	979-8-8554-2051-7

=== Anime ===
An anime television series adaptation was announced on May 17, 2022. It was produced by Silver Link and Blade, with Misuzu Hoshino directing the series, Mirai Minato serving as chief director and handling the scripts, Machi Yoshino designing the characters, and Kōji Fujimoto and Osamu Sasaki composing the music. The series aired from July 24 to October 9, 2022, on ABC and TV Asahi's Animazing!!! programming block. (Note: ABC and TV Asahi listed the series premiere at 26:00 on July 23, 2022, which is effectively 2:00 a.m. JST on July 24.) The opening theme song is "Su, Suki Janai!" (す、好きじゃない!; "I- I Don't Love You!") performed by ≠Me, while the ending theme song is "Himitsu no Niwa no Futari" (秘密の庭のふたり; "The Two People in the Secret Garden") performed by Yui Horie. Crunchyroll streamed the series.

==== Episodes ====
No.	Title (Note: All English titles are taken from Crunchyroll.)	Directed by (Note: Information is taken from the ending credits of each episode.)	Written by	Storyboarded by	Original release date
1	"The Maid I Hired Recently Is Mysterious"; Transliteration: "Saikin Yatotta Meido ga Ayashī" (Japanese: 最近雇ったメイドが怪しい)	Misuzu Hoshino	Mirai Minato	Misuzu Hoshino	July 24, 2022
Following the death of his parents, a young boy named Yuuri inherits his family mansion, but cannot afford servants. He attempts to run the mansion alone but fails spectacularly. A maid named Lilith appears at his front door; he deems her suspicious, even more so when she offers to work for no salary, but is ultimately convinced by her serious demeanour and intense purple eyes. Despite Lilith being excellent at her job, Yuuri only grows more suspicious of her and cannot stop thinking about her. Lilith is aware of his suspicion, but seems amused by it and even teases him, though she becomes flustered when Yuuri admits he finds her beautiful. Believing her to be a magician, he demands to know her intentions but she playfully insists her motives remain secret, which only raises Yuuri's suspicions further. Yuuri finds her awake in the kitchen at midnight and accuses her of having ensnared him with a love potion, though she is actually learning to cook his favourite foods. When Lilith addresses him by name as one's spouse would, Yuuri insists she stop until they grow to know each other better. Lilith is shown to possess a photo of Yuuri, and in a flashback, is shown receiving a letter shortly after the death of Yuuri's parents that causes her to immediately travel to his mansion.
2	"The Young Master, the Cat, and the Morning Glory"; Transliteration: "Bōchama to Neko to Asagao to" (Japanese: 坊ちゃまと猫と朝顔と)	Takahiro Hirata	Nanami Hoshino	Rin Teraoka	July 31, 2022 (Note: This episode aired at 2:20 a.m. JST, 20 minutes after the original air time on ABC Television.)
Lilith buys Yuuri gifts, making him believe she is trying to win his affection, so he embarrasses her by declaring he will win her over instead. When Lilith disappears, he grows suspicious until he finds her playing with a stray cat. Yuuri reveals he is afraid of cats but wants to conquer that fear. While Lilith is gone, another more aggressive cat appears, but Yuuri drives it away and befriends the stray cat. Lilith is visibly jealous of Yuuri petting the cat, becoming embarrassed when Yuuri also pets her. Yuuri sketches morning glory flowers but refuses to show Lilith until the sketch is finished. Believing a love potion to be behind his attraction to Lilith's dishes, Yuuri asks to learn to cook, embarrassing her by his praise of her food and his offer to marry her. Lilith later finds the morning glory sketch where Yuuri has compared the beauty of the flowers to her eyes. Yuuri is suspicious about what Lilith does after he goes to bed, but falls asleep before he can find out. It is revealed Lilith waits until he falls asleep so she can watch him sleeping.
3	"Gojouin Tsukasa Is Precocious"; Transliteration: "Gojōin Tsukasa wa Omase-san de aru" (Japanese: 五条院つかさはおマセさんである)	Misuzu Hoshino	Mirai Minato	Tetsurō Amino	August 14, 2022 (Note: This episode aired at 2:30 a.m. JST, 30 minutes after the original air time on ABC Television.)
Before he leaves for school, Lilith fusses over Yuuri, which reminds him of his parents. Lilith becomes bored in Yuuri's absence. At school, a girl named Tsukasa tries to talk to Yuuri, but is too nervous. Lilith arrives to pick him up from school despite his orders not to. Tsukasa sees them together and is immediately suspicious of their relationship, especially when she overhears Yuuri casually discussing Lilith's beauty and excitedly believes both of them to be in a taboo relationship. Tsukasa's butler, Fujisaki, arrives and recognises Lilith, who asks Tsukasa to continue being a good friend to Yuuri. Lilith stays out late stubbornly trying to find a certain fish for Yuuri's dinner, but it is sold out everywhere. She misses the last train but is driven home by a passing Fujisaki. When Lilith arrives home, a tearful Yuuri accuses her of bewitching him to miss her when she is gone. She "admits" to bewitching him, but also congratulates him for coping so well without her.
4	"Does the Young Master Like Pudding?"; Transliteration: "Bōchama wa Purin ga Osuki?" (Japanese: 坊ちゃまはプリンがお好き？)	Masashi Abe	Nanami Hoshino	Misuzu Hoshino	August 21, 2022
Lilith worries Yuuri is growing more suspicious of her, as he is convinced his attraction to her is the result of magic. As he monitors her constantly, she unsuccessfully tries to assuage Yuuri's suspicions. Lilith suggests they play chess, and Yuuri admits he used to play chess with his father and remembers his mother trying to make pudding in the meantime. Lilith offers to play chess with Yuuri whenever he wants, which makes him happy. The next day, Yuuri returns from school unhappy, so Lilith makes him pudding but is shocked when he accepts it without suspicion. Yuuri reveals that his school is holding an open house, but worries that others would be as attracted to her as he is. Lilith, relieved that Yuuri is still suspicious of her, becomes determined to attend. Yuuri is sad that Lilith does not arrive with other parents, but becomes happy when she arrives in a butler's uniform borrowed from Fujisaki.
5	"My Precious..."; Transliteration: "Boku no Daijina..." (Japanese: 僕の大事な...)	Rin Teraoka	Misaki Morie	Rin Teraoka	August 28, 2022
Yuuri is practicing for a sports festival and invites Lilith to attend so she can watch him compete. Tsukasa continues to spy on them, so Fujisaki tries to distract her by appearing cute. Following practice, Lilith offers to massage an exhausted Yuuri; her skill makes him suspicious. Tsukasa's parents are unable to attend the festival, so Fujisaki offers to attend, not realising until too late that Tsukasa has manipulated her. Yuuri is especially competitive during the festival, and Tsukasa suspects he is trying to impress Lilith. Lilith claims Yuuri will receive a reward if he wins, causing Tsukasa to jump to conclusions. Lilith is surprised when Yuuri reveals she has to compete in the parents' obstacle race, but wins first place after he cheers for her. After his classmates complain that a maid competing is unfair, Yuuri claims Lilith to be his precious family instead.
6	"The Maid I Hired Recently Is Weird!?"; Transliteration: "Saikin Yatotta Meido ga Okashī!?" (Japanese: 最近雇ったメイドがおかしい!?)	Naoki Hishikawa	Misaki Morie	Miyana Okita	September 4, 2022
Lilith is caught in the rain and jokingly asks Yuuri to join her for a bath, but becomes flustered when he claims they can't because they're not married yet. Lilith begins acting strangely and Yuuri confirms the rain gave her a fever. Lilith laments being sidelined from her maid duties, but Yuuri insists she focus on recovering. Lilith is perplexed when Yuuri starts helping with chores and wants to spend even more time with her. Tsukasa invites Yuuri to her Halloween party, so he decides to go as a sorcerer. Yuuri insists Lilith wear a costume so she dresses as a dragon girl, which drives Tsukasa mad with fantasies about their love life. Fujisaki is deeply embarrassed when Tsukasa forces her to wear a princess outfit for a photo shoot. The next day, Lilith receives letters in the post. Yuuri finds he is less suspicious of Lilith lately, but his suspicion returns when she tries to hide the letters. She reveals that her former employer, who she has been hiding from, has ordered her to return. Yuuri refuses to let her go, claiming himself to still be under her suspicious magic spell and that and she is his maid and no one else's. Lilith throws away the letters, and Yuuri hugs her for the first time.
7	"Not in My Textbook"; Transliteration: "Kyōkasho ni Nottenai" (Japanese: 教科書に載ってない)	Michita Shiraishi	Michiko Yokote	Tetsurō Amino	September 11, 2022
Yuuri thinks about Lilith constantly. Tsukasa realises he is oblivious, so she tells him he is in love. Lilith is concerned when Yuuri ignores her, even when she teases him suggestively. Yuuri almost asks her about love, but decides to ask Tsukasa instead. Yuuri worries Lilith might leave one day, though Tsukasa insists Lilith is happiest with Yuuri. To attempt to explain love, Tsukasa invites him to read her romance light novels, but Fujisaki confiscates them before Yuuri can be corrupted. Yuuri returns to normal, confusing Lilith again. As part of an art assignment, Yuuri decides to draw Lilith to expose her true nature, initially causing Lilith to fear he means to draw her naked. Yuuri is repeatedly unsatisfied with his drawing and begins to lose sleep. As he tries to sleep, he confesses to Lilith his confusion and worries he knows nothing about the real her. Lilith helps him sleep with a lullaby his mother used to sing. Yuuri awakens well rested but forgets what he and Lilith talked about. He insists Lilith sleep beside him again, though Lilith worries she is in danger of becoming sleep-deprived too. Despite Yuuri's drawing of Lilith not being finished to his satisfaction, it wins an award during art class.
8	"The Girl With the Purple Eyes"; Transliteration: "Murasakiiro no Hitomi no Shōjo" (Japanese: 紫色の瞳の少女)	Yūshi Ibe	Nanami Hoshino	Hiroaki Yoshikawa	September 18, 2022
Yuuri is suspicious when Lilith goes out nicely dressed and fears she has a date with someone. Lilith meets Fujisaki at a café and remembers that when they were at school Fujisaki was a delinquent, but abruptly changed after graduation. Lilith realises the change was caused by her meeting Tsukasa, and hopes she and Yuuri will be similarly close one day. Fujisaki tells Lilith that if she wants Yuuri to open his heart to her, she needs to do the same, which Lilith is unsure about. Yuuri, who had been following her, quickly returns home and confronts her. Overhearing her and Fujisaki had caused him to remember that when he was younger, his parents had brought a girl who was lonely and unapproachable into the house. He now realises it was Lilith; she had often sung him his mother's lullaby when his mother was away. Lilith wants to tell him everything, but Yuuri decides he needs to remember on his own. Tsukasa notices Yuuri acting differently and is convinced he and Lilith have made some progress with their relationship. Her reaction makes Yuuri realise that his feelings towards Lilith are not of suspicion, but of love. He rushes home and immediately confesses his love to Lilith, but before she can respond, they are both confronted by another maid who demands Lilith return with her immediately.
9	"Complicated, Convoluted, Perplexing, Honest Feelings"; Transliteration: "Hanzatsu de Fukuzatsuna Irikunda Sunao na Kimochi" (Japanese: 煩雑で複雑な入り組んだ素直な気持ち)	Tsutomu Murakami	Michiko Yokote	Hikaru Takeuchi, Kōji Yoshikawa, Tsutomu Murakami	September 25, 2022
Lilith explains that she and the maid, named Natsume, previously worked for the same employer. Natsume is disappointed that Lilith serves a child, and determines that Yuuri's educational level and lack of wealth makes him an unsuitable master, in spite of everything he does seeming to impress Lilith. Lilith confronts Natsume over being obsessed with her and demands she respect her wish to stay with Yuuri. Having recently realised his own feelings for Lilith, Yuuri realises Natsume probably loves Lilith too. Natsume eventually admits she loves Lilith. Yuuri returns to school and Lilith resumes her duties. Natsume refuses to believe Lilith is happy serving Yuuri, though she cannot reconcile this belief with how he and Lilith act around each other. Yuuri also observes Natsume and doubts she is a maid like Lilith, which is only proven when Natsume burns food and causes more messes than she manages to clean. This actually makes Lilith nostalgic, as she would always clean up after Natsume's mistakes. As Lilith and Natsume bathe together, Lilith confides to Natsume that she has no idea how to respond to Yuuri's earlier declaration of love. Natsume begrudgingly admits Yuuri is a good master and he clearly makes Lilith happy, though she doesn't tell Lilith why, deciding Lilith needs to realise it on her own.
10	"For Whom Do the Stars Fall"; Transliteration: "Dare ga Tame ni Hoshi wa Nagareru" (Japanese: 誰がために星は流れる)	Takahiro Hirata	Nanami Hoshino	Takahiro Hirata	October 2, 2022
Yuuri tells Tsukasa about Natsume, who is excited that Yuuri seemingly has a rival for Lilith's love. Natsume arrives to collect Yuuri from school and sees Fujisaki, who she is scared of. Natsume plans to leave soon, but as it is almost Christmas, she wants to buy a gift for Lilith first. Two older boys try to bully Yuuri, and though Natsume saves him, she is impressed that he stood up to them. Natsume asks for Yuuri's help to plan a surprise Christmas party for Lilith, so Yuuri tells Lilith he is spending Christmas with Tsukasa, which visibly disappoints her. Natsume then invites Lilith out on Christmas so Yuuri, Tsukasa and Fujisaki can prepare in her absence. Natsume struggles to make conversation with Lilith but they have fun nonetheless. Lilith buys Natsume hair ornaments and Natsume gifts Lilith a pen, asking her to write letters to her after she leaves. Returning to the mansion, Natsume is the one who is surprised, as Yuuri had plotted with Lilith beforehand to throw the party for Natsume instead. The party is a success, and after Tsukasa returns home and Natsume falls asleep, Yuuri leaves her a Christmas gift: a pair of woollen mittens Lilith helped him knit himself.
11	"It Must Have Always Been..."; Transliteration: "Kitto Ano Toki kara Zutto..." (Japanese: きっとあの時からずっと...)	Misuzu Hoshino	Mirai Minato	Tetsurō Amino	October 9, 2022
Lilith is greeted by her former master. Natsume, out shopping with Yuuri, admits to him that he has made her confident enough to confess to the man she loves, that being her and Lilith's master. Master is happy that Lilith enjoys working for Yuuri. Lilith reveals that when she was young her parents suddenly vanished, so two friends of theirs—Yuuri's parents—took her in, leading her to become a maid to repay them. It was during her training at Master's mansion that Yuuri's parents died and she left to look after Yuuri immediately. Yuuri, having arrived home with Natsume, is afraid Lilith is leaving, but Master assures him he is just there to collect Natsume. After Master and Natsume leave, an awkward atmosphere remains, as Yuuri and Lilith have not been alone for some time. Lilith asks if Yuuri wants to go anywhere and agrees when he asks if it is a date. In town, Tsukasa spots them together but is stopped from following them by Fujisaki. Under the glow of the Christmas lights, Lilith is finally brave enough to ask what kind of love Yuuri has for her. Yuuri says he doesn't know yet but looks forward to finding out with her. The following snowy morning, Lilith and Yuuri make snowmen of each other, and Lilith becomes embarrassed when Yuuri adds six snow children next to them.

== Reception ==
In 2020, the manga was nominated for the 6th Next Manga Awards in the print category and ranked 9th out of 50 nominees.

== See also ==
- Breasts Are My Favorite Things in the World!, another manga series by the same author
- The Great Jahy Will Not Be Defeated!, another manga series by the same author
- So You Weren't Into Me?!, another manga series by the same author
