= Blade (studio) =

Japanese animation studio

Blade Co., Ltd.
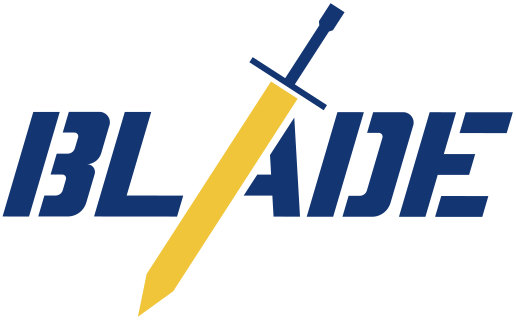
- Native name: 株式会社BLADE
- Romanized name: Kabushiki-gaisha Blade
- Type: Kabushiki-gaisha
- Industry: Japanese animation
- Founded: July 6, 1990; 36 years ago
- Headquarters: Kamishakuiji, Nerima, Tokyo, Japan
- Key people: Norio Yoshida (CEO)
- Total equity: ¥10,000,000
- Number of employees: 10
- Website: tap-blade.com

Blade Co., Ltd. (Japanese: 株式会社BLADE, Hepburn: Kabushiki-gaisha Bureido) is a Japanese animation studio based in Nerima, Tokyo founded in 1990.

== Works ==
=== Television series ===
Title	Director(s)	First run start date	First run end date	Eps	Note(s)	Ref(s)
Cheating Craft	Keitaro Motonaga	October 5, 2016	December 21, 2016	12	Original work.	
The Silver Guardian II	Li Haoling; Ken Andō	January 13, 2018	February 17, 2018	6	Sequel to The Silver Guardian. Co-produced with Emon.	
Iwa-Kakeru! Climbing Girls	Tetsurō Amino	October 4, 2020	December 20, 2020	12	Based on a manga by Ryūdai Ishizaka.	
The Greatest Demon Lord Is Reborn as a Typical Nobody	Mirai Minato	April 6, 2022	June 22, 2022	12	Based on a light novel by Myōjin Katō. Co-produced with Silver Link.	
The Maid I Hired Recently Is Mysterious	Mirai Minato; Misuzu Hoshino	July 24, 2022	October 19, 2022	11	Based on a manga by Wakame Konbu. Co-produced with Silver Link.	
Level 1 Demon Lord and One Room Hero	Keisuke Inoue	July 3, 2023	September 18, 2023	12	Based on a manga by toufu. Co-produced with Silver Link.	
Hokkaido Gals Are Super Adorable!	Mirai Minato; Misuzu Hoshino	January 9, 2024	March 26, 2024	12	Based on a manga by Kai Ikada. Co-produced with Silver Link.	
I Have a Crush at Work	Naoko Takeichi	January 6, 2025	March 25, 2025	12	Based on a manga by Akamaru Enomoto.	
My Friend's Little Sister Has It In for Me!	Kazuomi Koga	October 5, 2025	December 21, 2025	12	Based on a light novel by Ghost Mikawa.	
The Kept Man of the Princess Knight	Chihiro Kumano	January 2027	TBA	TBA	Based on a light novel by Tōru Shirogane.	
