= Cheating Craft =

Japanese anime television series

- Key visual

チーティングクラフト (Chītingu Kurafuto)
- Genre: Action, parody
- Anime television series
- Directed by: Keitaro Motonaga
- Written by: Takamitsu Kouno
- Music by: Go Sakabe
- Studio: Blade
- Licensed by: Crunchyroll
- Original network: Tokyo MX (Japan), PPTV (China), bilibili (China)
- Original run: October 5, 2016 – December 21, 2016
- Episodes: 12

Cheating Craft (Japanese: チーティングクラフト, Hepburn: Chītingu Kurafuto) is a Japanese-Chinese anime television series animated by Blade and produced by Emon. It is based on Gemini Xin Luo's novel Zuobi Yishu (Chinese: 作弊艺术). The anime series premiered on October 5, 2016, as a short anime and ran alongside To Be Hero.

== Plot ==
In a world where people have been sorted since childhood by exams, only those who excel obtain happiness. L (Learning) Types, who prioritize study, and C (Cheating) Types, those who choose not to study to pass, will battle and team up in exams. C Type protagonist Muming Zhuge (诸葛睦明) and L Type heroine Qiaoyi Huang battle together to pass tests.

== Characters ==
The character's Chinese name is listed first, followed by their Japanese name:

Muming Zhuge (諸葛 睦明) / Mumei Shokatsu (諸葛 睦明, Shokatsu Mumei) (Note: This is the Japanese pronunciation of the characters or using the words closest representing the meaning.)

Voiced by: Tomohiro Yamaguchi
His name originates from Zhuge Liang.

Qiaoyi Huang (黃 巧衣) / Koi Oh (黄 巧衣, Ō Kōi)

Voiced by: Rie Kugimiya

Guanyu Zhou (周 綸羽) / Rinu Shu (周 綸羽, Shū Rin'u)

Voiced by: Daisuke Namikawa
His name originates from Zhou Yu.

Baijiu Liu (劉 白玖) / Haku Ryu (リュウ ハク, Ryū Haku)

Voiced by: Reina Ueda

Li Xing (杏璃) / Anri (アンリ, Anri)

Voiced by: Yōko Hikasa

JUN (ジュン, Jun)

Voiced by: Junya Ikeda

Teacher Wong (王先生) / Teacher Oh (オウセンセイ, Ō Sensei)

Voiced by: Kotono Mitsuishi

== Media ==
=== Anime ===
The anime is directed by Keitaro Motonaga, with animation by Haoliners Animation League. Mai Matsuura and Norie Tanaka designed the characters. They also serve as chief animation directors, alongside Ryousuke Tanigawa. Yasunori Ebina is in charge of the sound effects and Go Sakabe is the composer of the series. Takamitsu Kouno collaborates on the writing of scenarios. Yutaka Kamogawa is credited as the main animator. Kenichi Ohnuki and Hisashi Saito are credited with design works, while Goichi Iwahata is credited with prop design. Kei Ichikura is the art director, while Hideki Imaizumi is the director of photography. Aiko Shinohara is in charge of the color design.

The female idol group Kamen Joshi performs the opening theme "Kasoku Suru Trial", while Aina Kusuda performs the ending theme song "Welcome Future", with lyrics by Saori Kodama, composition by Takahiro Yamada, and arrangement by Shinya Saitou.
