= List of Dog Days episodes =

Dog Days is a 2011 Japanese fantasy anime television series created by Masaki Tsuzuki. The series revolves around Shinku Izumi, a cheerful and athletic half-Japanese, half-English boy studying at Kinokawa International School in Japan who is suddenly summoned to the alternate world of Flonyard. The people there look no different from humans, except for one thing; they have animal ears and tails. The one who summoned him is Millhiore, the dog-like Princess of the Biscotti Republic, who requested his assistance in their war against the forces of the feline-like Galette Lion Dominion. The wars in Flonyard differ from the ones on Earth, and are waged with special rules and no casualties in a fashion similar to a sports competition with the purpose to raise funds for the Kingdoms involved, where the winner faction claims a larger sum than the losing side.

After winning his first battle for Biscotti, Shinku learns that when a hero is summoned into Flonyard he becomes unable to return to his homeworld, a fact that Millhiore also was unaware of. The scientists of Biscotti promise to Shinku to find a way for him to return home in 16 days, the remaining time until his meeting with his friend Rebecca whom he promised to spend the last three days of his spring break with.

Dog Days is produced by Aniplex and Seven Arcs under the directorship of Keizo Kusakawa, with series composition by Masaki Tsuzuki, character designs by Osamu Sakata, music by I've Sound, Maiko Iuchi, Susumu Natsume and Yui Isshiki, and produced by the production company Project DD. The series aired 13 episodes from April 2 to June 25, 2011, on Tokyo MX, Tochigi TV, Gunma TV, Chiba TV, TVK, TV Saitama and MBS, with subsequent runs on CBC and BS11. Six DVD and Blu-ray Disc volumes were released by Aniplex between July 27 and December 21, 2011.

A second anime season, called Dog Days' (ドッグデイズダッシュ, Doggu Deizu Dasshu), aired 13 episodes from July 7 to September 29, 2012, on Tokyo MX, with subsequent broadcasts on CBC, Chiba TV, TV Kanagawa, TV Saitama, Tochigi TV, Gunma TV, KBS Kyoto, Sun Television, and BS11. The second season is produced by Aniplex and Seven Arcs, as with the first season, albeit with Junji Nishimura replacing Keizo Kusakawa as director. The second season follows Shinku's return to Flonyard three months after the events of the first season, with Rebecca and his cousin Nanami accompanying him. Nanami joins the Galette Lion Dominion as their hero, while Rebecca joins the newly introduced, squirrel-like Principality of Pastillage, led by First Princess Couvert, as their hero. A third anime season, called Dog Days'' (ドッグデイズダブルダッシュ, Doggu Deizu Daburu Dasshu; Dog Days Double Dash) aired 12 episodes from January 10 to March 28, 2015.

For the first season, the opening theme is "Scarlet Knight" by Nana Mizuki, and the ending theme is "Presenter" by Yui Horie, both produced and composed by Elements Garden. The opening theme for the second season is "Fearless Hero" by Nana Mizuki and the ending theme song is "Natsu no Yakusoku" (夏の約束, Promise of Summer) by Yui Horie. The opening theme for the third season is "No Limit" by Nana Mizuki and the ending theme song is "Stay With Me" by Yui Horie.

== Series overview ==
Season	Episodes	Originally released	
Season	Episodes	First released	Last released
1	13	April 2, 2011	June 25, 2012
2	13	July 7, 2012	September 29, 2012
3	12	January 12, 2015	March 28, 2015

== Episode list ==
=== Dog Days (2011) ===
No.	Title	Original release date
1	"A Hero is Born!"; Transliteration: "Yūsha Tanjō!" (Japanese: 勇者誕生!)	April 2, 2011
Shinku Izumi makes a promise with his best friend Rebecca to go flower viewing during the last three days of Spring Break. However, while he is alone trying out some acrobatic moves in school, a dog appears and opens a magical portal while Shinku is in mid-air, resulting in him jumping through the portal with the dog. He arrives in the land of Flonyard, and is greeted by a beautiful girl, albeit with bestial features like dog ears and tail. The girl, who introduces herself as Princess Millhiore, requests for his assistance, which he agrees to and becomes the Princess' Hero, in order to drive away the forces of Galette which seeks to invade Biscotti.
2	"The First Battle!"; Transliteration: "Hajimete no Ikusa!" (Japanese: はじめての戦!)	April 9, 2011
Biscotti's army fights a losing battle with the forces of Galette until Shinku manages to hold off the enemy's offensive fighting alongside Captain Éclair Martinozzi. However, the two must join forces to confront Galette's commander and most powerful warrior, Leonmichelli Galette des Rois.
3	"I Want to Go Back! I Can't Go Back? Hero in Flonyard"; Transliteration: "Kaeritai! Kaerenai? Yūsha in Furonyarudo" (Japanese: 帰りたい!帰れない?勇者inフロニャルド)	April 16, 2011
The battle ends with Biscotti's victory, but Shinku learns that Millhiore was not aware that once he was summoned to Flonyard, he cannot return home. Meanwhile, Leonmichelli's younger brother, Gaul, learns of his sister's defeat and is eager to face Shinku in combat.
4	"Charge! Princess Recovery Battle!!"; Transliteration: "Totsugeki! Hime-sama Dakkansen!!" (Japanese: 突撃!姫様奪還戦!!)	April 23, 2011
Gaul's special forces, the Génoise trio, kidnaps Millhiore and he challenges Shinku to a duel. Shinku, Éclair and chief researcher Ricotta Elmar come with a plan to storm the fortress where she is being held to rescue her in time for her victory concert. Heavily outnumbered by the enemy, Shinku and Éclair manage to turn the tides when the freelance knights Brioche Dalkian and Yukikaze Panettone come to assist them.
5	"Fierce Battle at Fortress Mion!"; Transliteration: "Gekitō! Mion-toride!" (Japanese: 激闘!ミオン砦!)	April 30, 2011
Shinku and Gaul's duel is interrupted by Leonmichelli who reprimands both for ruining Biscotti's victory party. Almost running out of time for Millhiore's concert, Shinku comes with a plan to return the princess to the castle for her performance.
6	"Star Reading Princess"; Transliteration: "Hoshi Yomi no Hime" (Japanese: 星詠みの姫)	May 7, 2011
Shinku learns from Millhiore how she used her stargazing powers to learn about him and why she chose him as her hero. Meanwhile, Leonmichelli confirms by using her own stargazing powers that an ominous fate awaits them.
7	"Declaration of War"; Transliteration: "Sensen Fukoku" (Japanese: 宣戦布告)	May 14, 2011
Desperate to change Millhiore and Shinku's dreadful fate, Leonmichelli challenges Biscotti for another battle with each country waging their most sacred treasures on it. Millhiore reluctantly accepts the challenge, unaware of her true intentions.
8	"The War Starts"; Transliteration: "Kaisen no Hi" (Japanese: 開戦の日)	May 21, 2011
The day of the battle comes and it does not take long for Millhiore to confirm her suspicions about Leonmichelli's behavior and she joins Shinku and Éclair to storm the fortress where Leonmichelli is stationed to confront her. Meanwhile, Brioche and Yukikaze feel that a strange presence is approaching.
9	"Battle of Grana Fortress"; Transliteration: "Gurana-toride Kōbōsen" (Japanese: グラナ砦攻防戦)	May 28, 2011
Bearing both sacred swords, Millhiore reaches the top of the fortress to confront Leonmtchelli, who trembles when she realizes that her actions are leading the princess to the same destiny she fought so much to avert, when a powerful and ominous creature appears before them.
10	"The Hero, the Princess, and a Ray of Hope"; Transliteration: "Yūsha to Hime to Kibō no Hikari" (Japanese: 勇者と姫と希望の光)	June 4, 2011
The monster grabs Millhiore and flees the fortress on a rampage. Shinku struggles to reach the princess before she is absorbed by the creature, while she learns that the monster is actually a fox deity cub whose body was pierced by a cursed sword.
11	"Like a Flower Dancing in the Night Sky"; Transliteration: "Yozora ni Hana ga Mau yō ni" (Japanese: 夜空に花が舞うように)	June 11, 2011
Shinku and Millhiore manage to subdue the monster and restore the fox cub to its former self. Yukikaze offers herself to take care of it and a huge concert featuring the princess is held to celebrate the end of the hostilities between Biscotti and Gallete.
12	"Four Conditions"; Transliteration: "Yottsu no Jōken" (Japanese: 4つの条件)	June 18, 2011
At last Ricotta and her assistants come with a way for Shinku to return home. However, she finds that by doing so, not only he will forget all memories and experiences of his time at Flonyard, but he will never be able to come back. Upon learning of it, Shinku asks Ricotta to not tell the truth to the others, as he does not want them to send him off with a sad face.
13	"The Promise"; Transliteration: "Yakusoku" (Japanese: 約束)	June 25, 2011
Just after Millhiore confesses her love for him, Shinku is sent back home and has no recollections of his days at Flonyard. However, Ricotta learns that a way to make his memories return and be summoned back is possible, thanks to the possessions he left behind as a keepsake to his friends and the promise he made to them that he would indeed return. Upon regaining his memories, Shinku renews his vow to visit Flonyard again as soon as possible.

=== Dog Days' (2012) ===
No.	Title	Original release date
1 (14)	"A Hero Appears!"; Transliteration: "Yūsha Kenzan!" (Japanese: 勇者見参!)	July 7, 2012
Three months after leaving Flonyard, Shinku returns to Biscotti along with his friend Rebecca, while his cousin Nanami is summoned to Galette by Leomichelli and accepts to become her hero. After a brief reunion with Millhiore and his other friends, Shinku takes part in a special battle celebrating his return, soon after Nanami also joins the fight while Rebecca stays back at the castle with Millhiore. Watching the battle at her castle, Couvert, the Princess of Pastillage, decides to set off for Biscotti to ask Rebecca to become her hero.
2 (15)	"Pastillage Joins the Battle!"; Transliteration: "Pasutiyāju Sansen!" (Japanese: パスティヤージュ参戦!)	July 14, 2012
With one hero at each side, the special match between Biscotti and Gallete intensifies until the Pastillage army led by Couvert join the battle. After abducting Rebecca, Couvert has her forces confronting Shinku and Nanami's teams while she convinces Rebecca to join her side and be Pastillage's hero.
3 (16)	"Three Heroes!"; Transliteration: "Yūsha San'nin!" (Japanese: 勇者3人!)	July 21, 2012
Couvert and Rebecca join the fight and the three-way battle becomes even more intense until it ends with Gallete's victory. Shinku takes Nanami and Rebecca for a tour around Biscotti before he embarks for a special training camp with Éclair and Yukikaze.
4 (17)	"Biscotti Summer Camp!"; Transliteration: "Bisukotti Natsu-gasshuku!" (Japanese: ビスコッティ夏合宿!)	July 28, 2012
Nanami accompanies Leo back to Gallete and Couvert returns to Pastillage bringing Rebecca with her. While the three nations make preparations for the upcoming special event, Shinku joins Eclair, Yukikaze and Noir from the Génoise trio in a training camp to improve their abilities.
5 (18)	"Galette Sword Style Record!"; Transliteration: "Garetto Kenfūroku!" (Japanese: ガレット剣風録!)	August 4, 2012
Upon hearing about some acts of thievery occurring in the Galletian city of Ayase, Leo sends a small team along Nanami to expose and arrest the culprits. They get the unexpected help of a mysterious stranger, who is later revealed as Isuka Makishima, Brioche's elder brother and a famous blacksmith.
6 (19)	"Pastillage's Hero King Legend"; Transliteration: "Pasutiyāju Eiyū Ō Densetsu" (Japanese: パスティヤージュ英雄王伝説)	August 11, 2012
The rulers and heroes of the three nations have a meeting in Pastillage in preparation for the next event. Couvert brings Shinku before a monument to the Legendary Hero who founded the country and they accidentally release Valério Calvados, the ancient Demon King sealed there. Valério creates a huge commotion throughout the palace until Adélaïde Grand Marnier, the hero who was sealed along him, appears to put him in his proper place.
7 (20)	"Battle at the Cave of Sealing!"; Transliteration: "Fūin-dōkutsusen!" (Japanese: 封印洞窟戦!)	August 18, 2012
Adel, Valeri, Isuka and Brioche inspect a cave where they sealed some powerful demons in the past. When one of the seals is broken, a huge wave of mice demons break free. As the problem becomes more than the four can handle, Adel summons the other heroes who bring some friends with them to help against the mice.
8 (21)	"Esnart Arts and Music Festival"; Transliteration: "Esunāto Geijutsu Ongaku-sai" (Japanese: エスナート芸術音楽祭)	August 25, 2012
Millhiore is invited to sing at the Esnart Art and Music Festival in Pastillage. Just before her performance, the princess and Rebecca are attacked by a rogue cat deity who tries to steal their jewels and Shinku leads a team to catch her before she causes more trouble.
9 (22)	"Union Fest"; Transliteration: "Yunion Fesuta" (Japanese: ユニオン・フェスタ)	September 1, 2012
At last the special event featuring Biscotti, Gallete and Pastillage's armies begins. Éclair is avoiding Shinku since the cat thief incident, while Rico figures that she is in fact denying her true feelings for him and confronts her about it. Upon taking heed of the situation, Leo challenges her to a duel during the first round of the festival, claiming that Éclair cannot win against her as long as she keeps such hesitation in her heart.
10 (23)	"One-on-One In The Skies and On Land!"; Transliteration: "Kūriku Ikkiuchi!" (Japanese: 空陸一騎打ち！)	September 8, 2012
The Union Festival keeps going at full force with several one-on-one battles among key players of the three nations. Nanami challenges Brioche, while Shinku and Gaul have a duel using their Hero Crystals and Milhi has a heated aerial match with Rebecca. Seeing her country behind in the overall score, Adel decides to join the fight adopting the "secret" identity of Hero Mask.
11 (24)	"Change My Heart"; Transliteration: "Chenji Mai Hāto" (Japanese: チェンジ・マイ・ハート)	September 15, 2012
As the Union Festival goes on, Shinku and Millhi pay a visit to Yukikaze. When Millhi discovers the egg of a mystic creature, the egg hatches and both the three and the hatchling end up switching bodies. As the creature runs away in Shinku's body, the others join forces to corner it and return everyone back to normal.
12 (25)	"Final Stage"; Transliteration: "Fainaru Sutēji" (Japanese: ファイナルステージ)	September 22, 2012
As the Union Festival's end approaches, so does the time for the three heroes to return home. While searching for a present to Rebecca, Couver falls into a dungeon with Rico and Noir. The three barely evade the mortal traps set around the place until the others find their location and Shinku and Rebecca rush to save them.
13 (26)	"Summer Memories"	September 29, 2012
Shinku, Rebecca and Nanami spend the final days of their stay on Flonyard alongside their friends. The night before their departed, Shinku and Millhiore talks about the last time they parted ways, remembering how she confesses to him and how he answered back. The Princess requested to Shinku to hug him for her to remember Shinku's "warm and happy" hug. Each of them also receive from their respective rulers a special present before they are sent back to Earth, with the promise of returning in the near future.

=== Dog Days" (2015) ===
No.	Title	Original release date
1 (27)	"Once Again, The Hero Returns"; Transliteration: "Futatabi, yūsha no kikan" (Japanese: 再び、勇者の帰還)	January 10, 2015
The three heroes return to Flonyard but Shinku and Nanami's summoning is disrupted by a lightning bolt, leaving them stranded in a forest. While their friends search for the duo, they meet a girl named Sharl who offers them aid.
2 (28)	"Dragon Priestess"; Transliteration: "Ryū no miko" (Japanese: 竜の巫女)	January 17, 2015
Shinku and Nanami help Sharu protect the forest against hordes of rogue beasts, but after reuniting with their friends, a bigger threat appears.
3 (29)	"Big Battle! The Dragon Forest!"; Transliteration: "Kessen! Ryū no mori" (Japanese: 決戦! 竜の森)	January 24, 2015
The armies of Biscotti, Gallete and Pastillage join forces to vanquish a powerful demon that threatens the forest. To help Sharu seal the demon, Shinku, Nanami and Rebecca bring their powers to the limit.
4 (30)	"What's Passed On"; Transliteration: "Tsuga rete yuku mono" (Japanese: 継がれてゆくもの)	January 31, 2015
With the crisis averted, the heroes return to their respective kingdoms, but when Nanami and the Genoise Trio pay a visit to Pastillage, they get into a slimy mess when some dangerous creatures break free at the castle.
5 (31)	"Exploration at the Crystal Mines!"; Transliteration: "Tanken! Kesshō kōzan!" (Japanese: 探検! 結晶鉱山!)	February 7, 2015
Shinku and Rebecca joins a scientific expedition that turns into a dangerous adventure when a cursed creature threatens the local Fairies.
6 (32)	"The Lion's Arranged Marriage"; Transliteration: "Shishi no o miai" (Japanese: 獅子のお見合い)	February 14, 2015
The time has come for Leonmitchelle's annual challenge in which whoever defeats the princess earns the right to marry her, but this time, a new and powerful contestant who is an old friend of hers, appears as well.
7 (33)	"The Little Prince and the Legendary Hero"; Transliteration: "Chīsana ōji to densetsu no eiyū" (Japanese: 小さな王子と伝説の英雄)	February 21, 2015
After almost defeating Leonmitchelle in the challenge, Prince Leaf from the Kingdom of Halver is shown around Galette, Biscotti and Pastillage by the locals, and after attending one of Milhiore's concerts, they gather around Adel, who is about to tell them old stories of the past.
8 (34)	"Recollection: The Story of the Hero and the Princess"; Transliteration: "Tsuioku 〜 yūsha to hime no monogatari" (Japanese: 追憶〜勇者と姫の物語)	February 28, 2015
Adel and Valério tell Couvert and her friends their exploits to clear the land of demons along with Brioche, Isuca and Valério's long lost sister, Princess Clarifier, the one who summoned Adel to Flonyard and became her closest friend.
9 (35)	"The Star Whale in the Sky Sea"; Transliteration: "Sora no umi no hoshi kujira" (Japanese: 空の海の星鯨)	March 7, 2015
Upon learning that something is amiss with the Sky Priestess, Sharl seeks for the Heroes' aid and departs with them to the insides of the Star Whale, a massive flying deity where she resides.
10 (36)	"The Sky Priestess and the Star People"; Transliteration: "Sora no miko to hoshi no tami" (Japanese: 空の巫女と星の民)	March 14, 2015
Upon meeting the Sky Priestess, Shinku's party learns that the Star Whale is infested of demons, and the only way to cleanse it is by the voice of a talented singer. With Aria, the Sky People's songstress unable to sing, Shinku and Rebecca return to the surface seeking Milhiore's aid, but Verde, a strange enemy appears, intending to claim Aria for himself.
11 (37)	"Song of the Stars"; Transliteration: "Hoshi no utagoe" (Japanese: 星の歌声)	March 21, 2015
Once returning with reinforcements, Shinku joins forces with Gaul against Verde to rescue Aria, while Milhiore uses her song to heal the Sky Whale.
12 (38)	"Returning Home"; Transliteration: "Kikyō" (Japanese: 帰郷)	March 28, 2015
Once the Sky Whale is restored, Shinku and his friends return to the surface. Sometime later, the heroes are once again sent back to Earth, promising to return to Flonyard in the near future.
