= Kei Kusunoki =

Japanese manga artist

- Born: Mayumi Ōhashi; March 24, 1966 (age 60); Iwakura, Aichi, Japan
- Occupation: Manga artist
- Relatives: Kaoru Ohashi (sister)
- Website: K2Office (in Japanese)

Mayumi Ōhashi (大橋真弓, Ōhashi Mayumi; born March 24, 1966), better known by her pen name Kei Kusunoki (楠 桂, Kusunoki Kei), is a Japanese manga artist known for her horror and comedy manga series. Her notable works include Yagami-kun's Family Affairs, Ogre Slayer, and Girls Saurus.

== Biography ==
Kusunoki was born on 24 March 1966 in Iwakura, Aichi Prefecture. She is married and has a daughter Hana and a son. Kusunoki has collaborated with her twin sister Kaoru Ōhashi, who also works as a manga artist.

Kusunoki has focused most of her career on anime production. She debuted as a manga artist in 1982 in Ribon Original with Nanika ga Kanojo Tōri Tsuita?. Kusunoki had stopped writing manga for a period in order to cope with a miscarriage before returning and writing Bitter Virgin. Most of her works have not been officially translated and published in English.

== Works ==
- Nanika ga Kanojo Tōri Tsuita? (1982)
- Blood Reign: Curse of the Yoma (1985-1986)
- Yagami-kun's Family Affairs (1986-1990)
- Ogre Slayer (1992-2001)
- Dokkan Love (1996)
- Donmai Princess (2000)
- D no Fuuin (2000)
- Diabolo (2001-2003)
- Girls Saurus (2002)
- Girls Saurus DX (2003-2008)
- 100 Ways of an Exorcist (2005–present)
- Bitter Virgin (2006-2008)
- Innocent W (2004-2006)
- Sengoku Nights (2006)
- Vampire (or Kessaku Tanpenshuu Vampire)
- Koi Tomurai
- Yaoyorozu Toushinden Kami-gakari (2009–present)
