= Yagami-kun's Family Affairs =

Japanese manga series and its adaptations

- First tankōbon volume cover

八神くんの家庭の事情 (Yagami-kun no Katei no Jijō)
- Genre: Romantic comedy
- Manga
- Written by: Kei Kusunoki
- Published by: Shogakukan
- Imprint: Shōnen Sunday Comics
- Magazine: Shōnen Sunday Zōkan
- Original run: March 1986 – May 1990
- Volumes: 7
- Original video animation
- Directed by: Shin'ya Sadamitsu
- Produced by: Atsushi Yabe; Mitsuhisa Ishikawa
- Written by: Akinori Endō
- Music by: Ichiro Nitta; Ryo Yonemitsu; Takashi Kudo
- Studio: Kitty Film Mitaka Studio
- Released: May 25, 1990
- Runtime: 30 minutes
- Episodes: 3
- Television drama
- Directed by: Makoto Tsuji; Toshio Ōi; Yoshio Gōda
- Written by: Akira Momoi; Shōji Imai; Masahiro Kobayashi; Masahiro Kobayashi
- Studio: MIT Stonehills / ABC
- Original network: TV Asahi
- Original run: October 11, 1994 – February 2, 1995
- Episodes: 11
- icon

Yagami-kun's Family Affairs (Japanese: 八神くんの家庭の事情, Hepburn: Yagami-kun no Katei no Jijō) is a Japanese manga series written and illustrated by Kei Kusunoki. It was serialized in Shogakukan's Shōnen Sunday Zōkan from March 1986 to May 1990, with its chapters collected in seven tankōbon volumes. The manga was later adapted into a three–episode original video animation (OVA) in 1990, and an eleven–episode television drama.

== Plot ==
The story follows Yūji Yagami, a high school student with a problem: his mother, Nomi, looks very young and Yūji has a crush on her. To complicate matters, his high school homeroom teacher is also infatuated with her due to how young she looks. Nomi is oblivious to all of this and is head over heels in love with her husband, Yōji, and frequently displays this affection very publicly, which causes more embarrassment for Yūji.

Yūji's high school friends constantly tease him about his "mother complex". When Valentine's Day comes around, though, Yūji receives a box of handmade chocolates. The name on card can be read multiple ways, the most common way being Masayuki Ikari (五十里 真幸, Ikari Masayuki), a male name, so his friends tease him throughout the day until it is time to meet the person who sent the chocolates at the front gate after school.

The girl who sent the chocolates (the name is actually read "Mayuki") starts meeting him after school so they can walk home together, and they eventually become an item. The remainder of the story follows Yūji and Mayuki as their love grows and as Yūji works to resolve his "mother complex" issues.

== Characters ==
=== Main characters ===
Yūji Yagami (八神 裕司, Yagami Yūji)
Voiced by: Kazuki Yao
Yūji has a "mother complex" because his mother appears to be very young and he finds her attractive. This is used throughout the series for comedic effect. He feels guilty about how he feels about his mother.
Nomi Yagami (八神 野美, Yagami Nomi)
Voiced by: Chieko Honda
Yūji's mother. She is a bit naive and has a tendency to dote on her only son.
Mayuki Ikari (五十里 真幸, Ikari Mayuki)
Voiced by: Maria Kawamura
Yūji's girlfriend. Due to the characters used to write her given name (which can be read "Masayuki", a male name), the love note she sent to announce her feelings was interpreted as being from a boy, much to Yūji's chagrin and his friends' amusement. She is shy and indecisive, so it took her a long time to work up the courage to let Yūji know about her feelings. However, she has a temper and frequently gets upset at Yūji for his indecisiveness. She drives a bullet bike.
Akira Yokkaichi (四日市 明, Yokkaichi Akira)
Voiced by: Akira Kamiya
Yūji's homeroom teacher. He fell in love with Nomi at first sight, and is constantly flirting with her. Nomi is the only one who does not seem to notice his flirting, though.
Yōji Yagami (八神 陽司, Yagami Yōji)
Voiced by: Norio Wakamoto
Yūji's father, a salaryman. He has a very close, romantic relationship with Nomi, which often embarrasses Yūji.
Mitsuko Nanase (七瀬 密子, Nanase Mitsuko)
Voiced by: Hiromi Tsuru
A 23-year-old office lady. She secretly wishes to have an affair with her boss, Yōji, and is very jealous. She is constantly flirting with him.
Shigeki Yaoi (八百井 刺激, Yaoi Shigeki)
Voiced by: Nozomu Sasaki
Nomi's student. He acts as the comic foil to Nomi's unwitting naive mistakes.

=== Other characters ===
Kazuki Ichigaya (一ヶ谷一樹, Ichigaya Kazuki)
Voiced by: Mitsuo Iwata
One of Yūji's friend's from his homeroom at high school.
Futamura (二村)
Voiced by: Ryō Horikawa
One of Yūji's friend's from his homeroom at high school.
Miyake (三宅)
Voiced by: Hiroyuki Satō
One of Yūji's friend's from his homeroom at high school.

== Media ==
=== Manga ===
Yagami-kun's Family Affairs, written and illustrated by Kei Kusunoki, was serialized in Shogakukan's Shōnen Sunday Zōkan from the March 1986 to the May 1990 issues. Shogakukan collected its chapters in seven tankōbon volumes, released from August 18, 1987, to August 18, 1990.

==== Volumes ====
No.	Japanese release date	Japanese ISBN
1	August 18, 1987	978-4-09-121761-5
2	December 14, 1987	978-4-09-121762-2
3	June 18, 1988	978-4-09-121763-9
4	March 18, 1988	978-4-09-121764-6
5	December 14, 1989	978-4-09-121765-3
6	June 18, 1990	978-4-09-121766-0
7	August 18, 1990	978-4-09-121767-7

=== Original video animation ===
A three–episode original video animation (OVA) adaptation by Kitty Film Mitaka Studio was released in Japan on May 25, 1990.

=== Drama ===
An eleven–episode Japanese television drama was broadcast on TV Asahi from October 11, 1994, to February 2, 1995.
