= Soul Lady =

- Digital and streaming cover; the standard physical edition features a revised aspect ratio and white border

Studio album by Yukika
- Released: July 21, 2020
- Recorded: 2019–2020
- Studio: Estimate Studio; MonoTree Studio; Oreo Studio; Velvet Studio (Seoul)
- Genre: City pop; R&B; house; lo-fi
- Length: 40:53
- Language: Korean
- Label: Estimate; Dreamus
- Director: Digipedi; ESTi
- Producer: ESTi (exec.); 9rota; Choi Sin-yeob; Chu Dae-gwan; C-no; GDLO; Hwang Hyun; Iggy; MonoTree; MosPick; Nopari; Oreo; Prismfilter; Son Go-eun; TAK; Woong Kim

Yukika chronology
| Soul Lady (2020) | Timeabout (2021) |

Singles from Soul Lady
- 1. "Neon" Released: February 22, 2019; 2. "Cherries Jubiles" Released: July 9, 2019; 3. "Yesterday" Released: July 8, 2020; 4. "Soul Lady" Released: July 21, 2020

Soul Lady (Note: Korean: 서울여자; RR: seouryeoja, lit. "Seoul Lady") is the debut studio album by South Korea-based Japanese singer Yukika. It was released on July 21, 2020, by Estimate Entertainment and distributed by Dreamus. ESTi, the founder of Estimate Entertainment, served as executive producer and creative director for the project. The album marked the official solo debut of Yukika after retiring as a voice actress in Japan, and moving to South Korea in order to pursue a music career. Soul Lady is a city pop and R&B record, with house and lo-fi influences.

The album was supported by four singles, including Yukika's debut song "Neon" and the titular track, which were both released to critical acclaim. Soul Lady was positively received upon its release; reviews regarded it as a solid debut album with compliments on the cohesive production, the thematic nod to the 1980s, and its contribution to the renewed popularity of city pop as a genre. The record was ranked by several publications as one of the best albums of 2020, and it was nominated for Best Pop Album at the 18th Korean Music Awards.

== Background ==
On January 5, 2012, Yukika announced that she would be retiring as a voice actress in Japan in order to attend university. She returned to the industry in August 2015, appearing in several commercials and stage plays. The following year, Yukika successfully auditioned for The Idolmaster KR, a South Korean drama adaptation of the original game series. Real Girls Project, a Korean idol group was formed for the drama. Along with other members of Real Girls Project, Yukika was a contestant on the reality survival show Mix Nine in 2017. She was eliminated in the tenth episode, ranking 34th.

Following the disbandment of Real Girls Project, Yukika attracted the attention of Park Jin-bae (ESTi), the founder of Estimate Entertainment. They connected over their shared appreciation for the city pop genre and decided to work together; Yukika signed onto his record label in late 2018.

== Music and influences ==
Musically, Soul Lady is primarily influenced by R&B and city pop, a genre of Japanese pop music that was popularized in the 1980s. The record also features bubblegum pop, electropop, house and lo-fi styles, with elements of disco and funk. Yukika cited the music of Mariya Takeuchi, Tomoko Aran and Kim Hyun-chul as the stylistic references for the album's sound. Critics have also drawn musical comparisons to Japanese R&B music of the 1990s, namely the early works of Utada Hikaru, Namie Amuro, Miki Matsubara and Taeko Onuki. Despite city pop's common association with "retro style", Yukika was adamant that Soul Lady had to remain sonically "modern". In summation of her intention behind the record, she stated: "City pop may be considered something timeless or retro, [but] I don’t consider it ‘old music’ like others would. When I sing, I don't think of myself as singing ‘older music’. When I sing, I think of myself as singing current music."

Thematically, Soul Lady centers on the story of a young woman who travels from Tokyo to Seoul in search of her dreams and falls into a bittersweet romance in the process. The title of the album's introductory track, "From HND to GMP" (read as "From Haneda to Gimpo"), is in reference to the flight between Haneda Airport and Gimpo International Airport. The album draws parallels to Yukika's personal life as she adjusted to living in South Korea, and it has been described as largely autobiographical. Tanu I. Raj of NME noted the analogous nature of the album: "On Soul Lady, Yukika was a starry-eyed girl “full of curiosity”, new to Seoul and dazzled by the “endless lights”’, ready to “discover another me”. Her personal story – her journey from Japan to South Korea – became the gateway to an evolved version of herself, where she used her Japanese roots as a sounding board to explore sounds above and beyond."

"I Feel Love", the second track off the album, is a mid-tempo city pop song that borrows heavily from the funk genre. The accompanying trumpet on the track is played by Yoo Seung-cheol. Its lyrics speak about Yukika's initial excitement of moving to South Korea.

== Release and promotion ==
On December 7, 2019, Yukika announced via her Twitter account that her debut album would be released in 2020. Soul Lady was primarily recorded in the Seocho District, Seoul between 2019 and 2020.

=== Singles ===
"Neon" was released as the lead single to the then-unannounced album on February 21, 2019. It is a city pop and R&B song that lyrically explores the story of a woman who falls in love during the silence of the city lights at night. The premiere of the track was accompanied with the music video, which was directed by Digipedi. Yukika appeared on several South Korean music programs to promote the song, the first being SBS MTV's The Show on February 26, 2019. A promotional showcase for the single was held in Tokyo, Japan on April 23, 2019, and Yukika later performed "Neon" at the Makuhari Messe convention center as part of KCON Japan on May 17, 2019. "Neon" received critical acclaim upon its release, with Seung Park from Kotaku commenting that the track was a "wonderful ode to [the] 80s", and other reviewers praising it for being a part of the city pop genre resurgence.

The second single, "Cherries Jubiles", was released on July 9, 2019. A city pop track, Yukika sings about the difficulties of confessing your love to someone for the first time. The song premiered alongside the music video, which was directed by Digipedi. A director's cut of the music video was later made available on YouTube that features an updated display resolution and revised 4:3 aspect ratio. Additionally, the single contains an acoustic version of the song that is present on the Soul Lady album as the final track. At the time of the single's release, Yukika went on a brief hiatus for personal reasons, and was unable to promote it on music programs.

== Critical reception ==
Professional ratings
Review scores
| Source | Rating |
|---|---|
| Cultura | 3.5/5 stars |
| IZM | 3/5 stars |
| Miojo Indie | 8/10 |
| Sputnikmusic | 4.1/5 stars |

The album's sound has been credited with influencing the South Korean newtro trend, a portmanteau of the words "new" and "retro".

=== Year-end lists ===
Year-end rankings for Soul Lady
| Publication | Accolade | Rank | Ref. |
|---|---|---|---|
| Billboard | The 10 Best K-Pop Albums of 2020: Critics' Picks | 3 | |
| Miojo Indie | The 50 Best International Records of 2020 | 19 | |
| South China Morning Post | The Best K-pop Solo Albums of 2020 | —N/a | |
| Teen Vogue | The Best K-Pop Moments of 2020 (Erica Russell) | —N/a | |

=== All-time lists ===
All-time lists for Soul Lady
| Publication | Accolade | Rank | Ref. |
|---|---|---|---|
| We Got This Covered | The 10 best K-pop albums of all time, ranked | 9 | |

== Accolades ==
Awards and nominations for Soul Lady
| Year | Organization | Award | Result | Ref. |
|---|---|---|---|---|
| 2021 | Korean Music Awards | Best Pop Album | Nominated | |

== Track listing ==
Korean standard edition^{[a]}
| No. | Title | Writer(s) | Producer(s) | Length |
|---|---|---|---|---|
| 1. | "From HND to GMP" (Intro) | | ESTi; Oreo | 0:49 |
| 2. | "I Feel Love" | Private | Chu Dae-gwan (MonoTree); MosPick | 3:55 |
| 3. | "Soul Lady" (서울여자; seouryeoja [lit. "Seoul Lady"]) | ESTi; Park Ji-yeon (MonoTree); Choi Young-kyung | ESTi | 3:35 |
| 4. | "Neon" (네온; neon) | Iggy; C-no; Woong Kim; Oreo | Iggy; C-no; Kim; Oreo | 3:40 |
| 5. | "Yesterday" | GDLO (MonoTree) | GDLO (Monotree) | 3:42 |
| 6. | "A Day for Love" (발걸음; balgeoreum [lit. "Footsteps"]) | Son Go-eun (MonoTree) | Son; Nopari (MonoTree) | 3:19 |
| 7. | "Pit-a-pet" (안아줘; anajwo [lit. "Hug Me"]) | TAK | TAK; Choi Sin-yeob (Seibin) | 4:01 |
| 8. | "Cherries Jubiles" (좋아하고 있어요; joahago isseoyo [lit. "I Like You"]) | Chu; GDLO (MonoTree) | Chu; GDLO (MonoTree) | 4:05 |
| 9. | "I Need a Friend" (친구가 필요해; chinguga piryohae; Interlude) (featuring Kim Ha-neul) | | ESTi | 1:32 |
| 10. | "Shade" (그늘; geuneul) | Hwang Hyun (MonoTree) | Hwang; 9rota (Prismfilter) | 4:16 |
| 11. | "All Flights Are Delayed" (Outro) | | ESTi | 1:32 |
| 12. | "Neon 1989" | Iggy; C-no; Kim; Oreo | ESTi; Iggy; C-no; Kim; Oreo | 2:26 |
| 13. | "Cherries Jubiles" (좋아하고 있어요; joahago isseoyo [lit. "I Like You"] (Acoustic Version) | Chu; GDLO (MonoTree) | Chu; GDLO (MonoTree) | 4:01 |
| Total length: | | | | 40:53 |

=== Notes ===
- ^{^[a]}"Neon" is omitted from digital international versions of the album at the request of the original distributor, Kakao M.
- "I Feel Love", "Neon", "Soul Lady", "Shade", and "Neon 1989" is stylized in all uppercase.
- "Pit-a-pet" is stylized in all lowercase.

== Personnel ==
Credits adapted from Tidal and the album's liner notes.

Vocals

- Yukika Teramoto – primary artist
- Jeon Jae-hee – background vocals (tracks 2, 5)
- Choi Young-kyung – background vocals (tracks 3, 7)
- Jang Hye-ji – background vocals (track 4)
- Kim So-hyun – background vocals (track 4)
- Yoo Young-jin – background vocals (tracks 6, 8)
- Kim Ha-neul – narration (track 9)
- Hwang Hyun – background vocals (track 10)

Instrumentation

- Jam String – strings (tracks 1, 12)
- Chu Dae-gwan – bass (track 2), brass (track 8)
- Joo Hyun-woo – brass (track 2), saxophone (tracks 2, 8)
- Kim Dong-min – guitar (track 2, 8)
- Ferdy – guitar (track 2)
- Son Young-jin – keyboard (track 2)
- Park Kyung-geon – trombone (tracks 2, 8)
- Yoo Seung-cheol – trumpet (tracks 2, 8)
- Choi Sin-yeob – bass (track 3), guitar (tracks 3, 7, 9), keyboard (track 7)
- ESTi – keyboard (tracks 3, 9, 11–12)
- Iggy – bass (track 4), guitar (track 4)
- C-no – bass (track 4), keyboard (track 4)
- Woong Kim – keyboard (track 4)
- GDLO – bass (track 5), keyboard (track 5)
- Yoon Sung-ho – guitar (track 5)
- Park Ki-tae – guitar (track 6)
- Son Go-eun – keyboard (track 6)
- TAK – keyboard (track 7)
- Kim Byung-seok – bass (track 8)
- Junpi – piano (track 8)
- Park Gi-hu – flute (track 8)
- 9rota – keyboard (track 10)
- Hwang Hyun – keyboard (track 10)
- Benicx – strings arrangement (track 12)
- Jukjae – acoustic arrangement (track 13), guitar (tracks 8, 13)

Production

- ESTi – creative direction, executive production, music production (tracks 1, 3, 9, 11–12)
- Oreo – music production (tracks 1, 4, 12)
- Chu Dae-gwan – music production (tracks 2, 8, 13), vocal direction (track 2)
- MosPick – music production (track 2), vocal direction (track 2)
- Choi Young-kyung – vocal direction (track 3, 8, 13)
- C-no – music production (tracks 4, 12), vocal direction (track 4)
- Iggy – music production (tracks, 4, 12), vocal direction (track 4)
- Woong Kim – music production (tracks 4, 12), vocal direction (track 4)
- GDLO – music production (tracks 5, 8, 13), vocal direction (tracks 3, 5, 8, 13)
- Nopari – music production (track 6)
- Son Go-eun – music production (track 6), vocal direction (track 6)
- Choi Sin-yeob – music production (track 7)
- TAK – music production (track 7), vocal direction (track 7)
- 9rota – music production (track 10)
- Hwang Hyun – music production (track 10), vocal direction (track 10)

Technical

- Kwon Nam-woo – mastering (tracks 1–3, 5–7, 9–12)
- Lee Sang-deok – recording (tracks 1, 12)
- Chu Dae-gwan – digital editing (tracks 2, 8, 13), mixing (track 13), recording (tracks 8, 13)
- Koo Jong-pil – mixing (tracks 2–3, 5)
- Hong Ki-hong – recording (tracks 2, 8)
- Choi Da-in – recording assistant (track 2)
- Lee Chan-mi – recording assistant (track 2)
- Choi Young-kyung – digital editing (track 3)
- ESTi – digital editing (tracks 3, 5), mixing (tracks 9, 11–12), recording (tracks 9, 11–12)
- GDLO – digital editing (tracks 3, 8, 13), recording (tracks 8, 13)
- Jaden Jeong – A&R (track 4)
- Park Jung-eun – mastering (track 4)
- Lee Tae-seop – mixing (track 4)
- Oreo – recording (track 4)
- Nopari – digital editing (track 6)
- Son Go-eun – digital editing (track 6)
- Park Chul-geun – mixing (track 6)
- TAK – mixing (track 7)
- Bk! – mastering (tracks 8, 13)
- Noah Taylor – mixing (track 8)
- Kang Seon-young – digital editing (track 10), recording (tracks 2–3, 5–8, 10, 13)
- Hwang Hyun – digital editing (track 10)
- 9rota – mixing (track 10)

== Charts ==
=== Weekly chart ===
Weekly sales chart performance for Soul Lady
| Chart (2020) | Peak position |
|---|---|
| South Korean Albums (Gaon) | 8 |

=== Monthly chart ===
Monthly sales chart performance for Soul Lady
| Chart (2020) | Peak position |
|---|---|
| South Korean Albums (Gaon) | 41 |

== Release history ==
Release dates and formats for Soul Lady
| Region | Date | Format | Version | Label | Ref. |
|---|---|---|---|---|---|
| Various | July 21, 2020 | Standard | Digital download; streaming | Estimate; Dreamus | |
| South Korea | August 10, 2020 | Standard | CD | Estimate; Dreamus | |
