= List of Dog Days characters =

This is a list of characters for the anime series Dog Days, including its sequels, titled Dog Days′ (Dog Days Dash) and Dog Days′′ (Dog Days Double Dash) respectively.

== Earthlings ==
Cinque Izumi (シンク・イズミ, Shinku Izumi)
Voiced by: Mamoru Miyano
A 13-year-old half-Japanese, half-British boy from Cornwall and the protagonist of the series. He is summoned to the alternate world of Flonyard, the Kingdom of the Biscotti Republic as Princess Millhiore's "Hero". He wields the Divine Sword of Biscotti, "Palladion" (パラディオン, Paradion), a weapon that despite being originally a sword, can assume different forms according to its owner's preference (Cinque usually makes a staff of it). He has a cheerful and straightforward personality, always going at his own pace. Athletic and acrobatic, he loves sports as well. He was a first-year middle school student in Japan's Kinokawa International School prior to the summon. He can fire destructive energy beams from the tip of Palladion, and can create a hoverboard called the Tornader (トルネイダー, Toruneidā) from Palladion as well, channeling the flames for propulsion. In the end of both the first and second seasons, both Cinque and Millhi expressed feelings of love for each other, although it still not clear the true nature of their relationship.
In the second season, Cinque receives from Adel a special magic gemstone called the Hero Crystal (英雄結晶, Eiyū-kesshō), that allows him to temporarily transform in an adult version of himself with enhanced flame powers.
Rebecca Anderson (レベッカ・アンダーソン, Rebekka Andāson)
Voiced by: Mikako Takahashi
Nicknamed Becky (ベッキー, Bekkī) by Cinque, Rebecca is a 13-year-old girl who studies at Japan's Kinokawa International School and childhood's best friend of Cinque. She has a busybody attitude and is the one who understands Cinque the best, and usually feels lonely when he is not around. She goes to Cinque's house every morning to wake him up for school. She has a love for fashion, games, manga, and fantasy-themed novels. She was looking forward to a promise that she made with Cinque, that her family (she and her mother) and Cinque's family (Cinque and his parents) would go flower-viewing during the last three days of Spring Break.
In the second season, Cinque brings her to accompany him in his return to Flonyard, where she is scouted by Couvert to join the Principality of Pastillage as their hero. Upon accepting Couvert's offer, Becky receives from her the Divine Sword of Pastillage, "Mercurius" (メリクリウス, Merikuriusu), that in her hands is transformed into a broom-like rocket she can use to fly or an energy rifle. It also equips her with a deck of cards imbued with various types of offensive magic. She also receives from Valério a special magic gemstone called the Demon Crystal (魔神結晶, Majin-kesshō) that, just like Cinque and Gaul's Hero Crystals, allows her to temporarily transform in an adult version of herself with enhanced magic powers. At the end of the second season, she told Cinque that she loves him. Cinque replies to her that he loves her too though it is not clear if he loves her as a lover.
Nanami Takatsuki (高槻 七海, Takastuki Nanami)
Voiced by: Nana Mizuki
Cinque's 15-year-old cousin and an acquaintance of Becky. She is also Cinque's rival in the Iron Athletics (アイアンアスレチック, Aian Asurechikku), a game closely related to Ninja Warrior, where she placed first (to Cinque's chagrin). In the second season, Nanami is summoned to Flonyard by Leonmitchelle to serve as a heroine under her, in the same fashion as Cinque is chosen as Millhiore's hero. The weapon she wields is the Divine Sword "Ex Machina" (エクスマキナ, Ekkusu-Makina), which like Cinque's Palladion, assumes the form of a staff according to Nanami's preference. Ex Machina's staff form looks exactly like Palladion's staff form, save for the color scheme. She can also create ice skates from Ex Machina, allowing her to glide on and manipulate water, and can also morph it into a boomerang. Nanami also holds the distinction of being the only character to challenge and fend off Brioche, who was known as the strongest character in the entire series, in a one-on-one fight on near-equal terms for almost the entirety of the battle before being defeated, which clearly showcases her martial arts and athletic superiority over Cinque.
In the third season, Nanami receives a special magic gemstone called the Spirit Crystal (精霊結晶, Seirei-kesshō), that just like Cinque and Gaul's Hero Crystals and Rebecca's Demon Crystal, allows her to temporarily transform in an adult version of herself with enhanced water and ice powers.

== People of Flonyard ==
=== Biscotti Republic ===
Millhiore Firianno Biscotti (ミルヒオーレ・F （フィリアンノ）・ビスコッティ, Miruhiōre Firianno Bisukotti)
Voiced by: Yui Horie
Affectionately nicknamed Millhi (ミルヒ, Miruhi), Millhiore is the 13-year-old Princess of Biscotti Republic with a gentle and hardworking personality. Despite being young and inexperienced for a leader, she is loved by everyone in the nation. She is also a singer at the same time, holding events and concerts and appearing in person in front of everyone despite her status. She is also the one who summoned Cinque to Flonyard in the first place by sending her dog familiar, Tatsumaki, to open up a portal on Earth while Cinque attempted to jump off from some heights in school (because of his love for circus acrobatic acts), and is the owner of one of Divine Swords pair "Excelide" (エクセリード, Ekuserīdo). She chose Cinque as her beloved hero after watching him taking part in the Iron Athletics on Earth with her stargazing powers, but was unaware that a summoned hero cannot return to his home world and only found out about that when it was too late. At the end of the first season, Millhi confesses her love to Cinque.

==== Biscotti Knight Army ====
Éclair Martinozzi (エクレール・マルティノッジ, Ekurēru Marutinojji)
Voiced by: Ayana Taketatsu
Nicknamed Écle (エクレ, Ekure), Éclair is the 14-year-old female Knight of Biscotti as well as the captain of the Imperial Guards unit directly under Millhiore's command. She has been training as a knight since childhood, and is proficient in dual-sword wielding. She bears great admiration towards Millhiore and holds her with utmost respect. She is always troubled by Cinque's "ignorance of the ways of the world", and has a very serious attitude, albeit stubborn. In addition, she serves as the foil to Cinque, and is a tsundere towards him much like Rebecca. A running gag is that she has an inferiority complex about her ears, as they are smaller in size but are drooping down as compared to the other characters. She can unleash shock waves from her blade. She seems to have a one-sided love for Cinque. In the second season, she became the leader of the Knights of Biscotti and trained with Dalkian during the time gap. During a skirmish with a jewel thief, she accidentally kisses Cinque on the mouth, therefore getting her (and Cinque's) first kiss.
Loran Martinozzi (ロラン・マルティノッジ, Roran Marutinojji)
Voiced by: Takehito Koyasu
Known as "Iron Wall" Loran (鉄壁のロラン, Tekkabe no Roran), he is Éclair's 34-year-old older brother and the leader of the Knights of Biscotti. An earnest and hardworking man which earned the trust of Millhiore. Millhiore thinks of him as a brother figure. In the second season, he gave his position to his sister.
Emilio Alcide (エミリオ・アラシード, Emirio Arashīdo)
Voiced by: Yūki Ono
A member of the Biscotti Knight Army.
Anje (アンジュ, Anju)
Voiced by: Seiko Yoshida
A member of the Biscotti Knight Army.

==== Firianno Castle ====
Ricotta Elmar (リコッタ・エルマール, Rikotta Erumāru)
Voiced by: Nana Mizuki
Nicknamed Rico (リコ, Riko), Ricotta is the 13-year-old Chief Researcher of the National Research School of Biscotti despite being the same age as Cinque. She is an extremely intelligent individual who is friendly at the same time, but her curiosity tends to get the better of her in various situations. She has a lot of friends in the Knights of Biscotti. She is working hard to solve Cinque's "problem", and is always intrigued by machinery that she does not know about and wants to analyze them, even going as far as wanting to take apart the machine. Tends to finish her sentences with "~de arimasu".
Amelita Tremper (アメリタ・トランペ, Amerita Toranpe)
Voiced by: Asami Seto
Millhiore's 24-year-old secretary who schedules everything for her, from official work, wars, and even concerts. As someone who Millhiore trusts, there are a lot of situations which she interacts with Loran, hinting a romantic relationship between the two.
Riselle Conchiglie (リゼル・コンキリエ, Rizeru Konkirie)
Voiced by: Mana Hirata
The 26-year-old head of the Maid Squad in Firianno Castle, she manages the cleanliness of the castle, as well as the health and safety of Millhiore. She always keep her eyes closed, which is also her charm point.
Elders (元老院)
Voiced by: Kazuo Oka, Inchika Etigoya, and Junpei Asashina
The elder advisors of the Biscotti Republic.

==== Onmitsu Squad ====
Brioche Dalkian (ブリオッシュ・ダルキアン, Buriosshu Darukian) / Hina Makishima (ヒナ・マキシマ)
Voiced by: Yōko Hikasa
A freelance knight in the Knights of Biscotti, she is also known as "Strongest in the Land", surpassing the "Strongest of Biscotti", Éclair. Extremely proficient in the usage of an ōdachi, she is almost unbeatable in battle. She has a love for sake, and is elegant and quiet. She is the leader of Biscotti's covert-ops team, the Onmitsu Squad (オンミツ部隊, Onmitsu Butai), whose mission is to protect a certain secret. She uses "sessha" and "de gozaru" in her speech, a formal archaic form of speech much used by samurai in the past. It is revealed near the end of the first season that Brioche is actually a celestial canine who has been working behind the scenes with Yukikaze for more than a hundred years to suppress and seal any demons that may threaten the peace in Flonyard. It is revealed in Dash that she has an older brother, Isuka, who is a master swordsmith and samurai, and that her current name was given to her upon becoming a Biscotti Knight.
Yukikaze Panettone (ユキカゼ・パネトーネ, Yukikaze Panetōne)
Voiced by: Kana Asumi
Affectionately nicknamed Yukki (ユッキー, Yukkī), she is a fox girl and another freelance knight in the Knights of Biscotti who frequently works with Brioche. The chief (next-in-command after Brioche) of the Knights of Biscotti's Onmitsu Squad, she looks upon members of the squad as siblings, be it dogs or foxes. She instantly got along with Cinque when they first met, and dotes on him a lot. Yukikaze makes use of agile movements in battle, as uses various weapons such as bare fists, tantō, bows, etc. She admires Brioche a lot and addresses her with "Oyakata-sama" (My Lady), a very formal archaic form of speech used when one addresses his/her lord in the past. It is revealed near the end of the first anime that Yukikaze is actually a fox deity who has been working behind the scenes with Brioche for more than a hundred years to suppress and seal any demons that may threaten the peace in Flonyard. Yukikaze's attire and fighting style resembles those of a ninja, and just like her master, she uses "sessha" and "de gozaru" in her speech.
Tatsumaki (タツマキ)
A member of the Knights of Biscotti's Onmitsu Squad trusted by Brioche, Yukikaze and Millhi. He was entrusted with Biscotti's Summoning Sword and was the one responsible for bringing Cinque to Flonyard.
Homura (ホムラ)
A small white dog that gets along with Tatsumaki and Cheney. It is part of the Knights of Biscotti's Onmitsu Squad, taking on the task of delivering messages.
Konoha (コノハ)
A small white fox like creature with a bell around its neck that emits a high pitched tone when the presence of a demon is detected. A member of the Knights of Biscotti's Onmitsu Squad.

==== Commentators ====
Percy Gaudi (パーシー・ガウディ, Pāshī Gaudi)
Voiced by: Mana Hirata
A reporter on Biscotti's side, her role is of the announcer during battle broadcasts.
Evita Salles (エビータ・サレス, Ebīta Saresu)
Voiced by: Miyu Matsuki
Percy's boss. Evita is the director of Biscotti National Broadcasting.

=== Galette Lion Dominion ===
Leonmichelli Galette des Rois (レオンミシェリ・ガレット・デ・ロワ, Reonmisheri Garetto de Rowa)
Voiced by: Ami Koshimizu
Affectionately known as Leo (レオ, Reo), she is the 16-year-old leader and Princess of the Galette Lion Dominion. During their childhood, Leo and Millhiore were very close friends, but Leo started avoiding her after learning about her tragic destiny. She dislikes being called a Princess, and prefers to be called "Her Majesty" (閣下, Kakka). A brave warrior, she uses heavy armor (hidden underneath semi-revealing clothing) and weapons in battle. She is the owner of the Demonic Battleaxe "Grand Vert" (グランヴェール, Guranwēru) and Divine Sword "Ex Machina" (エクスマキナ, Ekkusu-Makina), both of them are the treasured swords representing the country of Galette. As the leader of Galette, she has to carry the burden of living up to the expectations of her people. Witnessing Millhiore and Cinque's deaths in the near future (within one month from the point where this truth was shown to the audience) by her star-reading power, she desperately tries to avoid it at all costs and that appears to be the reason why she initiates wars with Biscotti at an alarming rate. She talks with a masculine tone, her speech pattern similar to that of an old man (frequently uses "washi" and "jaa"). She enjoys being petted by Millhiore. In the second season, Leo summons Cinque's cousin, Nanami, to serve as a heroine under her, and correspondingly gives her Ex Machina as her weapon.
Gaul Galette des Rois (ガウル・ガレット・デ・ロワ, Gauru Garetto de Rowa)
Voiced by: Tetsuya Kakihara
Nicknamed Gau (ガウ), he is the 13 year-old Prince of Galette and Leo's younger brother. A confident and powerful warrior of Galette, albeit hot-blooded and sort of a gag character at times. His battle style resembles Cinque's, making use of light armor and agile movements. He seems to connect to Cinque through battles, and views him as a rival. He also fights honorably, much like his sister. Directly under his command are General Godwin and the Imperial Guard trio "Génoise". He is a Prince that everyone of Galette adores, and Leo claims to willingly relinquish the throne to him when he gets mature enough, as she views him to be a more suitable ruler. Just like Cinque, Gaul receives from Adel a Hero Crystal that allows him to temporarily transform in an adult version of himself with enhanced powers.

==== Galette Knight Army ====
Godwin Dorure (ゴドウィン・ドリュール, Godowin Doryūru)
Voiced by: Norio Wakamoto
A 55-year-old general of Galette's Knight Army, he respects Gaul as his commander a lot despite Godwin being much older and experienced. Enjoys letting loose completely on the battlefield, he wields a battle axe with a gigantic steel ball attached to it in battle and is feared by all.
Bernard Sabrage (バナード・サブラージュ, Banādo Saburāju)
Voiced by: Daisuke Ono
A general of Galette and also the leader of the Knights of Galette. He supports Leo not in just battles, but also on official matters. He often takes the position of the commentator during battle broadcasts. He has a long history with Rolan of the Biscotti Republic, and is a friend of his. Happens to be married.
Cheney (チェイニー, Cheinī)
A cat affiliated with Galette's Onmitsu Squad. She was entrusted with Galette's Summoning Sword and was the one responsible for bringing Nanami to Flonyard. She gets along with Tatsumaki and Homura.

==== Génoise ====
Noir Vinocacao (ノワール・ヴィノカカオ, Nowāru Vinokakao)
Voiced by: Kana Hanazawa
An expressionless and quiet 14-year-old girl who is a member of the Imperial Guard Unit Génoise (ジェノワーズ, Jenowāzu), a Super Sentai-like trio of warriors who serve directly under Gaul's command..
She excels in the usage of throwing knives and short swords, and defeats her opponents with elegant techniques. Though she looks as though she is always deep in thoughts, she frequently forgets about the most important of things. In Season 2, she has been training with Dalkian during the time gap so that Galette has their own demon-hunting squad, like the Onmitsu Squad.
Jaune Clafoutis (ジョーヌ・クラフティ, Jōnu Kurafuti)
Voiced by: Yoriko Nagata
A cheerful 16-year-old girl and another member of Génoise who speaks with a queer Western intonation. She wields a gigantic battle axe in battle with seemingly minimal effort. Her current aim is to win against General Godwin in a battle, whom she currently lost to 92 times.
Vert Far Breton (ベール・ファーブルトン, Bēru Fāburuton)
Voiced by: Minako Kotobuki
A gentle 14-year-old rabbit-girl and another member of Génoise who is an airhead at the same time. Using a bow as her weapon, her prowess and accuracy with it is of master-class. Despite that, she is known to be "destructively clumsy" out of battle, during normal days.

==== Other occupants ====
Violet Amaretto (ビオレ・アマレット, Biore Amaretto)
Voiced by: Sakura Tange
A cat-girl who officially leads the Galette Lion Army's Imperial Guard. Violet is also Leo's attendant from infancy.
Rouge Piedmont (ルージュ・ピエスモンテ, Rūju Piesumonte)
Voiced by: Yukika Teramoto
Rouge is one of the Galette maids serving Leo and Gaul. She is also an acquaintance of Millhiore.

==== Commentators ====
Jean Casoni (ジャン・カゾーニ, Jan Kazōni)
Voiced by: Yūki Ono
Framboise's boss. Jean is the director of Galette National Broadcasting.
Framboise Charley (フランボワーズ・シャルレー, Furanbowāzu Sharurē)
Voiced by: Takahiro Sakurai
A reporter on Galette's side, his role is of the announcer during battle broadcasts, and he does that with passion.

=== Principality of Pastillage ===
==== Pastillage Royal Family ====
Couvert Eschenbach Pastillage (クーベル・E（エッシェンバッハ）・パスティヤージュ, Kūberu Esshenbahha Pasutiyāju)
Voiced by: Aoi Yūki
The 12-year-old First Princess of Pastillage who is still in-training as her country's next ruler. She has deep friendly relations with Millhiore and Leonmichelli, and looks up to become a ruler like them. People that she is friendly with address her by "Lady Cou" (クー様, Kū-sama). Despite being free-spirited and mischievous, she is recognized for her talent in judging people. She possesses the Heavenly Spear "Coumars" (クルマルス, Kurumarusu) from her own mother, despite it being a gun (it is said that in Pastillage, people call guns "spears"). Couvert uses it as a one-handed Crystaltech Gun while flying on a magic carpet. Upon seeing Rebecca's image, Couvert recognizes her as a kindred spirit, looking up to and wanting to be on par with Cinque and Nanami besides not being as athletic as them, just as Couvert herself does towards Millhi and Leo, thus she sets to Biscotti and successfully invites her to become her heroine. She speaks in Kansai dialect, hence why she addresses herself using Uchi (家), a pronoun for "I" that is commonly used by females from the Kansai region.

==== Crystaltech Knights ====
Callaway Risler (キャラウェイ・リスレ, Kyarawei Risure)
Voiced by: Takahiro Mizushima
A knight of the Order of the Crystaltech Knights (晶術騎士団, Shōjutsu Kishi-dan), as well as Captain of the Order of the Eschenbach Knights (エッシェンバッハ騎士団, Esshenbahha Kishi-dan). He has a very serious attitude, and works very hard to ensure what Couvert does ends up to be for the better, as her aide. He also strives hard with his job as Jefferson Gallows II's subordinate, as he is at Jefferson's mercy of his usual breaking point.
Liscia Enrobéz (リーシャ・アンローベ, Rīsha Anrōbe)
Voiced by: Maaya Uchida
A knight of the Order of the Crystaltech Knights, as well as Captain of the Order of the Flytech Knights (飛空術騎士団, Hiutsu Kishi-dan). Supports in Pastillage's battles as a skillful Flying Knight.

==== Ancient characters ====
Adélaïde Grand Marnier (アデライド・グランマニエ, Aderaito Guranmanie)
Voiced by: Eri Kitamura
Known as Hero King Adel (英雄王アデル, Eiyū Ō Aderu), she is the Legendary Hero who defeated the Demon Lord Valério Calvados and was sealed along him to keep him at bay. She is also Couvert's ancestor and wields a pistol and a broadsword in battle. She was originally summoned from France by the last princess of the Pastiage Territory, Clarifier Einz Pastillage, 100 years prior to the series. She ends her sentences with "nano desu". Before being sealed, Adel and Valeri also used to travel along Isuka and Brioche, sealing demons and keeping rogue deities from causing trouble.
Valério Calvados (ヴァレリオ・カルバドス, Varerio Karubadosu)
Voiced by: Kousuke Toriumi
Known as Demon King Valeri (魔王ヴァレリー, MaŌ Varerī), he is the ancient Demon Lord defeated by Adélaïde Grand Marnier and sealed along her. Upon Cinque and Couvert releasing the seal, Valério is brought back to life and reveals himself as a pervert invading the female baths to peep on them. Capable of absorbing the energy of his opponents, Valério proves himself as a powerful adversary, able to hold even against Cinque, Nanami and Rebecca's combined power, but is easily subdued by Adélaïde, who forces him to apologize for all the trouble he caused. Together with Adel he is the ancestor of Couvert, though it is unknown if they were ever married.

== Other characters ==
Foxes (キツネ)
Voiced by: Ami Koshimizu (Child fox) and Ai Orikasa (Mother fox)
Two fox spirits. In season 1, Leo foresaw a star composition of Millhiore and Cinque targeted by the deadly rampage of the child fox that is attracted to their sacred swords later revealed to have been demonized with a cursed sword impaled to its head. The mother fox beg Millhiore to end her child's pain, instead she and Cinque release the cursed sword then Brioche and Yukki exorcised it. Yukki would care for the child fox.
Isuka Makishima (イスカ・マキシマ)
Voiced by: Anri Katsu
Brioche's older brother who is a master swordsmith. He is also known to have created various swords and blades on par with the treasured swords. After reuniting with his sister, Isuka returns to Biscotti where he mounts a shop.
Sharl (シャル, Sharu)
Voiced by: Sumire Uesaka
Sharl is a horse-girl armed with a bow and a "Dragon Priestess" that serves the elemental dragons that maintain the balance of Flonyard's environment. She resides in the south continent of Dragon Forest on the Corone Plateau. In season 3, she encounters Cinque and Nanami when they were thrown off course during their summoning due to a lightning strike. It is hinted that Sharl holds strong feelings for Cinque.
Pega (ペガ, Pega)
Pega is Sharl's familiar presented to her by the Sky Priestess, normally seen as a small creature, its true form is of a giant, powerful beast.
Leaf Lang de Shar Harva (リーフ・ラング・ド・シャー・ハルヴァー, Reefu Rangu Do Shaa Haruvaa)
Voiced by: Fumiko Orikasa
Prince of the Kingdom of Harva, Leaf is a rabbit-boy and is a distant relative of Vert's. He is also a childhood friend of Leonmichelli's, and joined the marriage games just looking to get closer to her once more, unaware of its true means. Armed with a sword for close combat and a crossbow for ranged attacks, his skills in combat puts him almost on par with Leonmichelli, who defeats him with a certain difficulty. After the games, he befriends Cinque and the others, hanging out with them while traveling through Biscotti, Galette and Pastillage.
Aria (アリア, Aria)
Voiced by: Yui Ogura
Introduced in the third season, she is the diva of the Star Village that dwells within the Star Whale. As the Sky People's songstress Aria cleanses the liquid and watercress. When the Star Whale is infested with demons, Sharl requested the Heroes' help resolve the seriousness since Aria too weak to hum her voice. With Millhiore's aid she simulates her own singing voice to recuperate the sky people. It is told that Adelaide had genuine connection with the sky people.
