= Timeabout =

Timeabout,
- Digital & "Yellow" version cover

EP by Yukika Teramoto
- Released: April 7, 2021
- Studio: Honey Butter Studio · GLAB Studios · DART Studio · BIXIZ XOUND · IGGY Studio
- Genre: K-pop; city pop
- Length: 18:50
- Language: Korean
- Label: Ubuntu Entertainment; YG Plus
- Producer: Lee Dae-hyun (exec.)

Yukika Teramoto chronology
Soul Lady (2020)	Timeabout, (2021)	Time-Lapse (2023)

Singles from Timeabout,
- 1. "Lovemonth" Released: March 2, 2021; 2. "Insomnia" Released: April 7, 2021

Timeabout (stylized as Timeabout,) is the first extended play by Japanese musician Yukika Teramoto, released on April 7, 2021, by Ubuntu Entertainment and distributed by YG Plus. It is her first release under Ubuntu following her departure from Estimate Entertainment in November 2020. Released eight months after her debut album Soul Lady, the EP is also influenced by Japanese city pop and is characterized by its heavy use of retro synthesizers, bass guitar and disco-inspired percussion. It is intended to be the first entry of a "Time" trilogy.

== Release and promotion ==
On February 21, 2021, Teramoto's label announced that she would be releasing an EP during the first half of the year alongside a teaser photo titled "Past: Illusion One". The first single "Lovemonth" was subsequently announced on February 24. "Lovemonth" was released on March 2 and peaked at 143 on the Gaon Download Chart. A release schedule was posted on March 25, revealing the track listing, release date, as well as teaser photos and videos over the weeks leading up to April 7.

The EP was released on April 7 in yellow and blue variations. A music video for the track "Insomnia" was released on the same day and depicts Teramoto traveling to the past to motivate her younger self, intercut with shots of a clock filling with water.

To promote Timeabout, Teramoto appeared on various music programs throughout April, performing "Insomnia" on Show Champion and The Show.

== Track listing ==
Timeabout track listing

No.	Title	Lyrics	Music	Arrangement	Length
1.	"Leap Forward (Intro)"		Memme	Memme	1:06
2.	"Insomnia"	Lim Soo-ho; Kim Woong; N!ko	Lim Soo-ho; Kim Woong	Lim Soo-ho; Kim Woong	3:27
3.	"Lovemonth" (애월 (愛月); aewol)	Muzie; X.Q	Muzie; Spacecowboy; X.Q; Jade	Spacecowboy; Jade	3:34
4.	"Time Travel"	Bull$EyE; Boran; Aaron.H	Bull$EyE; Boran; Aaron.H	Bull$EyE; Boran; Aaron.H	3:19
5.	"Secret" (비밀리에; bimillie [lit. "Secretly"])	Dr.JO	Dr.JO	Dr.JO	3:32
6.	"Pung!" (별방울; byeolbang-ul [lit. "Star Drop"])	Park Moon-chi; Dalchong; Ahn Shin-ae	Park Moon-chi; Dalchong; Ahn Shin-ae	Park Moon-chi	3:52
Total length:					18:50

Notes:

- "Time Travel" and "Pung!" are stylized in all caps.

== Personnel ==
Credits adapted from Melon.

- Yukika Teramoto – lead vocals (tracks 2–6)
- Memme – composition, arrangement (track 1)
- Park Jeong-Eon – mastering (all tracks)
- Lim Soo-ho – lyrics, composition, arrangement, guitar, drum arrangement, recording (track 2)
- Kim Woong – lyrics, composition, arrangement, bass arrangement, electric piano (track 2)
- N!ko – lyrics, composition, arrangement, electric piano, synthesizer arrangement (track 2)
- Limgo – lyrics (track 2)
- Kim So-hyun – background vocals (track 2)
- Choi Jae-young – mixing (track 2)
- Muzie – lyrics, composition, vocal direction (track 3)
- X.Q – lyrics, composition (track 3)
- Spacecowboy – composition, arrangement, programming, vocal direction, rhythm programming, electric piano, bass arrangement, brass arrangement, synthesizer arrangement (track 3)
- Jade – composition, arrangement, programming, rhythm programming, electric piano, bass arrangement, synthesizer arrangement (track 3)
- Kim Areum – vocal direction, background vocals (track 3)
- Lee Tae-wook – guitar (track 3)
- Lee Sung-sil – recording (tracks 3–6), mixing (track 6)
- mOnSteR nO.9 – mixing (track 3)
- Bull$EyE – lyrics, composition, arrangement (track 4)
- Boran – lyrics, composition, arrangement (track 4)
- Aaron.H – lyrics, composition, arrangement, drum arrangement, drum programming (track 4)
- Kim Kwang-hoon – guitar (track 4)
- Heo Jin-woo – electric piano (track 4)
- Yang Hye-jin –background vocals (track 4)
- Kim Soo-bin – vocal editing (track 4)
- Team AMG – mixing (track 4)
- Dr.JO – lyrics, composition, arrangement, programming, synthesizer arrangement (track 5)
- JYP Publishing – publishing (track 5)
- Lee Moon-Ki – guitar (track 5)
- Kim Sung-soo – bass (track 5)
- PERRIE – background vocals (track 5)
- Shin Bong-won – mixing (track 5)
- Park Moon-chi – lyrics, composition, arrangement, guitar, drum arrangement, bass arrangement, electric piano, synthesizer arrangement, background vocals (track 6)
- Dalchong – lyrics, composition, background vocals (track 6)
- Ahn Shin-ae – lyrics, composition (track 6)
- Lee Dae-hyun – executive producer
- Kwak Seung-gyu – artist management
- Lee Jeong-eun – A&R
- SoOom – A&R
- Song Seon-ah – styling
- Kim Dae-un – styling
- Park Eun-jung – hair
- Kim Yoon-young – make-up
- Rose – choreography
- Choi Bo-yoon – photography
- Studio Greenhouse – design

== Charts ==
Weekly

Chart (2021)	Peak position
South Korean Albums (Gaon Chart)	35

Monthly

Chart (2021)	Peak position
South Korean Albums (Gaon Chart)	88

== Sales ==
Region	Sales
South Korea (Gaon)	8,446

== Release history ==
Region	Date	Format	Label
South Korea	April 7, 2021	CD; digital download; streaming	Ubuntu Entertainment, YG Plus
Various	April 7, 2021	CD; digital download; streaming	Ubuntu Entertainment, YG Plus
