= Diabolo (manga) =

Japanese manga series

ディアボロ
- Genre: Horror, supernatural
- Manga
- Written by: Kaoru Ohashi; Kei Kusunoki
- Published by: Shueisha
- English publisher: NA: Tokyopop
- Original run: 2001 – 2003
- Volumes: 3

Diabolo (ディアボロ) is a Japanese manga series by Kaoru Ohashi and her sister Kei Kusunoki. It was serialized by Shueisha from 2001 to 2003.

== Plot ==
Diabolo revolves around teenagers in Japan being converted to followers of the "Diabolo" by a secret society, in exchange for the fulfillment of their wishes. Teens who have made a pact with the Devil begin to go crazy at age 17, often manifesting in acts of brutality and homicide, and upon turning 18 reach a point of no return to their original selves. The phenomenon is a mystery to the adult world and media, who try to ascertain the origin of mass teen violence. There are six great spirits (also teenagers) that serve the Devil, each of which has a hand in destroying the world. The main characters, Ren and Rai, use their own Devil-given powers to stop them while searching for their cousin Mio, saving other teenagers from their pacts, and racing against their approaching 18th birthdays. It describes its plot as "The age where the ensured bend to temptation and slowly fall from human to devil."

== Characters ==
=== Main characters ===
Rai
An orphan who became friends with Ren as a young child. On his seventeenth birthday he gained the power of "Ultimate Defense," making him invulnerable to any attack. After that, he left the orphanage to find Ren, confronting him with the knowledge of their pact with the Diabolo (memories which Ren had suppressed) and the hope that Mio might still be alive. Later, Rai (who has become one with the demon Nebiros) reveals his secret obsession, jealousy, and love-hate relationship with Ren, who had been oblivious to these feelings all along. Rai is the more serious and solemn of the pair, though he does conceal many of his true feelings with a smile.
Ren
Rai's best friend. Through his deal with the Diabolo, he gained the power of "Ultimate Offense," making him capable of, among other things, exploding glass bottles with just an accidental touch and creating huge holes in walls with one punch. This leads him to be very fearful of what his power can do to normal humans, causing him to only use it to save and kill the people that have fallen. Soon after Rai found him, Ren's mother went insane, trying to force Ren to sleep with her, and upon his refusal, set herself and their house on fire. After this, Ren decides to join forces with Rai to try to save others from falling to the Diabolo. Despite his extremely tragic life, Ren usually tries to find a way to be as happy as possible, providing comic relief with his naivety and ineptitude with technology.

=== Side characters ===
Mio
Ren's cousin, who disappeared when she was seven after Ren and Rai made a pact with the Devil to be strong for her safety. Though her body was never found, Ren and Rai were accused of killing her. Ren and Rai believe Mio is still alive and spend the series trying to find her. Eventually Mio is revealed to be alive and retains her childhood form. It is revealed that she is the mastermind behind the entire story. Betrayed by the ones who were supposed love her, she accepted that her parents had given up on her. However, her dying wish was to devoid anyone of happiness and "break" the world. Although she was sacrificed, she was chosen by the devil and became Diabolo.
Hiromi
A girl Rai and Ren "saved," helping her to see the truth about the Diabolo after she sold her soul for beauty. She drops out of school and isolates herself in her apartment with her mother, trying to help Ren and Rai defeat the Diabolo using information garnered from chatroom and the internet. She appears to be a hikikomori, or at least have hikikomori tendencies. After fending off her crazed mother's attacked and killing her, Hiromi manages to alert the police to the location of the final confrontation. She also seems to have a hand in Lucifuge Rofocale's death, appearing before his true form. She is presumed to have died in her mother's lap.

=== Six Great Spirits ===
All six of the Great Spirits' names are taken directly from the hierarchy of hell as listed in The Grand Grimoire. They are teenagers who have adopted the names of the Great Spirits following their pacts with Diabolo and the acquisition of their powers. They are the primary antagonists for Ren and Rai.

Agliarept
Known as "The General", he has the ability to read minds, discover all secrets, and claims to heal in his sleep. His real name is Kyouya. He acts like a delinquent and robs people of their money. After encountering Ren and Rai, he grows to be envious of their deep friendship and wishes he had met them before he had fallen. Despite his rather prickly, cynical personality, Kyouya has a soft side as well, evident through him taking care of Ren after he becomes wounded. During their fight, Kyouya willingly gets defeated so that Ren can save Rai. Kyouya reveals to Ren that he's the bastard son of a wealthy, dead businessman and his mistress and left home after his relatives found out about his terminal illness. His true reason for joining Diabolo is due to his terminal illness, revealing his desire to take down the world that lets him rot. He and Fleurety seem to care for each other. Though his powers are gone, Kyouya appears to be alive and well at the end of the story.
Satanachia
Due to his beauty, he has the ability to enslave all and manipulate them at will, alive or dead. His real name is Rei. Rei is an abandoned child, and has lived in hospitals most of his life. It is alluded to that he was molested and possibly raped due to his beauty. Childlike and cheerful, with a dangerous lust for blood, his sadistic nature is quickly exposed when he murders an entire hospital ward. Rei claims to be the most sinless of the Spirits. The exact reason he fell to the Devil is unclear, but Nana admits to being the one that introduced him to the Diabolo. Rei is ultimately killed when Nana crushes his heart as an act of friendship to prevent him from committing any more acts of sin.
Fleurety
Known as "Lieutenant Commander", Fleurety is the "Queen of the Night" and invulnerable when night falls. Her real name is Tsukiko ("moon child"), and is a pun on her abilities. In her mid-teens, she was the victim of a family suicide, after her father lost his job and killed everyone. She survived with a huge scar across her chest only to become the victim to her uncle's sexual abuse. Because of these childhood traumas, she developed dissociative identity disorder. Ren fully understand how she feels because of their similar childhood and comforts her. Her reason for joining Diabolo is to obtain invulnerability during the night. Her powers include the ability to absorb other's powers, such as when she used Kyouya's swordsmanship and soul-reading to fight Ren. Like Kyouya, she is alive and well at the end of the story although her powers are gone.
Sargatanas
Known as the "Brigadier Major" and "Spirit of the Wind", Sargatanas can travel freely between dimensions. Her real name is Nana. Nana is homeless and crossdresses at night to prevent being taken advantage of. She distrusts adults as they appear to be the reason for why she is homeless. After Rai sees through her disguise, Nana, realizing that Rai is a great guy, quickly falls in love with him. Nebiros uses this fact to his advantage and attempts to seduce her to do his bidding. Knowing that the real Rai would never seduce a woman he doesn't love, Nana saves Ren in hopes that he will be able to save the man she loves. She appears to be friends with Rei and acts as his guardian, eventually killing him as an act of friendship. Despite being heavily wounded by Nebiros, she saves Tsukiko also in the hopes that she will be able to stop Nebiros. Nana is presumed dead at the end of the story.
Nebiros
The cruelest spirit that controls premonition and pain, Nebiros awakens in Rai in his 17th year. As Nebiros, Rai's personality completely changes to the extent that the other Spirits are overwhelmed by his cruelty after witnessing his massacre of the teenagers who came for salvation. The other Spirits fear Nebiros more so than Master and Nema and obey his orders willingly. It is later revealed that all the Spirits are sacrifices and Nebiros seeks to merge with Ren in order to survive. At the end of the story, Nebiros succeeds in merging with Ren but Ren maintains control of the body and kills Mio. A hint of Rai seems to leak through when he shows a pained expression right before he merges with Ren. Nebiros is presumed dead because Ren dies.
Lucifuge Rofocale
He describes himself as an intelligent spirit with courage who controls all wealth and knowledge. His real name is Yuu. Yuu sends Hiromi valuable information about the Diabolo because of his crush on her, only to stab her in the back in the end, preventing her from sending information to Ren. Nema found him first of all the Spirits, and his real body is hidden away, unable to move. He sold his soul for a holographic body, which he uses like a normal one. Yuu is presumed to be killed by Hiromi.

== Release ==
Diabolo was written and illustrated by twin sisters Kei Kusunoki and Kaoru Ohashi, and 3 volumes were published by Shueisha from 2001 to 2003. It is published in French by Soleil, and was published in English first by Tokyopop in Northern America, and then it was later re-released by Digital Manga Publishing in 2012.

== Reception ==
Liana Cooper of Anime News Network criticised the first volume for being episodic. However she felt it started off "pretty exciting". In Manga:The Complete Guide Jason Thompson described the "visuals and action scenes are weak".
