= Yukika Teramoto =

Japanese singer and actress

- 寺本 來可
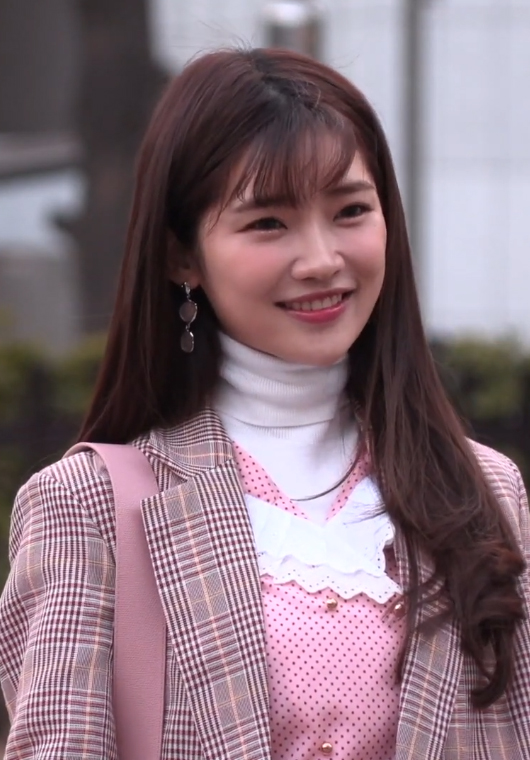
- Yukika Teramoto arriving to perform at Music Bank on March 22, 2019
- Born: February 16, 1993 (age 33); Shizuoka, Japan
- Other names: Yukika; Kika
- Occupations: Singer; actress
- Years active: 2006–2012; 2015–2023
- Agent: Ubuntu Entertainment
- Notable work: ChocoMimi; The Idolmaster KR
- Height: 163 cm (5 ft 4 in)
- Spouse: Kim Min-hyuk (m. 2023)
- Children: 1
- Musical career
- Genres: J-pop; K-pop; City pop
- Formerly of: Choco & Mimi; Real Girls Project
- Website: www.yukika.kr

Yukika Teramoto (寺本 來可, Teramoto Yukika; born February 16, 1993), also known mononymously as Yukika (Korean: 유키카; Japanese: ユキカ), is a Japanese singer and actress based in South Korea. She is also a former model and voice actress.

After successfully auditioning for Nicola in 2006, Teramoto modeled exclusively for the magazine until 2009. In 2007, she made her acting debut in the live-action drama adaptation of ChocoMimi. From 2009 to 2012, she provided voice acting for several anime and video game series, most notably Rouge Clafoutis from Dog Days, Chiri Nakazato from Seitokai Yakuindomo, and Kaname Nonomiya from Gal Gun.

After taking a hiatus in 2012 to focus on her university studies, Teramoto returned to entertainment in 2015. In 2016, Teramoto starred in the South Korean drama The Idolmaster KR and debuted in the tie-in Korean idol girl group "Real Girls Project", jumpstarting her career in South Korea. In 2019, she released her first Korean solo single, "Neon". She released her debut album, Soul Lady, in July 2020.

== Career ==
=== 2006–2009: Modeling and acting debut ===
In 2006, Teramoto was one of the Grand Prix winners in the 10th model auditions for pre-teen fashion magazine Nicola out of 5,986 applicants. She began working as an exclusive model for Nicola beginning in the September 2006 issue until March 2009 issue. She made her acting debut in the live-action adaptation of ChocoMimi in 2007. In addition to playing the lead character Choco, Teramoto also released music as her character along with Kayano Masuyama under the name Choco & Mimi. Their first single, "Happy Happy!", was released in 2008 as the opening theme song to ChocoMimi and reached #175 on the Oricon Weekly Singles Chart.

In 2008, Teramoto made her film debut with a minor role in Handsome Suits. She also appeared in commercials for Pocari Sweat from Otsuka Pharmaceutical, Baskin Robbins, and Bandai Namco Entertainment's Happy Dance Collection for the Nintendo Wii.

=== 2009–2012: Voice acting career and hiatus ===
After graduating as a model from Nicola, Teramoto enrolled in the agency I'm Enterprise as a voice actress and debuted with a minor role in K-On! She began attending the voice acting school NichiNare. Aside from providing additional voices in various anime and video game series, Teramoto also had a recurring role on Dog Days as Rouge Clafoutis, Seitokai Yakuindomo as Chiri Nakazato, and Gal Gun as Kaname Nonomiya. On December 28, 2011, Teramoto resigned from I'm Enterprise, effectively putting her voice acting career on hiatus, in order to attend university.

=== 2015–2023: Real Girls Project, solo music debut, and retirement ===
Teramoto returned to the entertainment industry in August 2015 and appeared in commercials and stage plays. She stated she had been interested in South Korean culture since listening to "Gee" by Girls' Generation. She also grew up listening to Korean artists such as Girls' Generation, Kara, and BoA. In 2016, she auditioned for The Idolmaster KR, a South Korean drama adaptation of the original game series. She was the only Japanese cast member to be selected. Aside from playing a fictionalized version of herself in The Idolmaster KR, Teramoto was also part of the Real Girls Project, a Korean idol group formed for the drama. Teramoto was also a contestant on the reality show Mix Nine along with other members of Real Girls Project; she finished in 34th place.

After Real Girls Project disbanded, Teramoto left Mole Entertainment and signed with Estimate Entertainment. In 2018, Teramoto was cast as Yui, a supporting role for the South Korean web drama Hello, Stranger! She provided the voice to Athena and Palas in the mobile game Destiny Child; she also provided a new version of the game's theme song, "Da yo ne Da yo ne."

On February 22, 2019, Teramoto released her debut Korean solo single "Neon", which had a "new retro girl" concept based on the city pop genre. Later that year, her followup single "Cherries Jubiles" was released on July 9. In preparation for her first solo album, Soul Lady, Teramoto released "Yesterday" on July 8, 2020, as a pre-release track. Soul Lady was officially released on July 21, 2020, alongside its title track.

On November 30, 2020, Teramoto announced the termination of her contract with Estimate Entertainment. A month later, Teramoto signed with Ubuntu Entertainment, a new agency established by her former manager.

In February 2021, Ubuntu Entertainment announced that Teramoto will return with her first extended play sometime in the first half of 2021. A pre-release single, "Lovemonth", was released on March 2, for her upcoming extended play, titled Timeabout,. Timeabout, was released on April 7, 2021, along with the music video for the lead single off the EP, titled "Insomnia".

On September 20, 2021, Teramoto released the digital single "Loving You". On September 29, Teramoto released her first Japanese original single "Tokyo Lights", a few months after debuting the Japanese version for "Insomnia".

On June 23, 2022, Teramoto released the digital single "Scent".

On December 1, 2023, Teramoto released Time-Lapse, a collection of remakes of classic city pop songs.

== Personal life ==
On April 23, 2022, Ubuntu Entertainment announced that Teramoto will marry a non-celebrity Korean boyfriend. On July 1, 2022, Teramoto revealed through YouTube that her husband is Kim Min-hyuk, a former member of the South Korean boy band MAP6. On March 26, 2023, Teramoto announced through Instagram the couple had married the day prior. On March 25, 2024, Teramoto gave birth to her daughter.

== Filmography ==
=== Live-action ===
==== Television ====
Year	Title	Role	Network	Notes
2007	ChocoMimi	Chiyoko "Choco" Sakurai	TV Tokyo	Lead role
2017	The Idolmaster KR	Yukika	SBS	Lead role
2017	Mix Nine	Herself	JTBC	Reality competition show; finished in 34th place
2018	Must Eat: It's OK to Live Alone	Herself	SBS Plus	Reality show
2018	Hello, Stranger!	Yui	tVN Asia	Web drama; supporting role

==== Films ====
Year	Title	Role	Notes
2008	Handsome Suits	Extra	Film debut

==== Theater ====
Year	Title	Role	Notes
2015	Gakuya: Nagare Saru Mono wa Ya ga Tenatsukashiki		
2015	Twelve Angry Men		
2016	Aoi Season		

==== Music video appearances ====
Year	Artist	Song	Notes
2007	Muramasa	"Yumefurin"	
2008	Motohiro Hata	"Kimi Meguru Boku"	
2019	Sungtae	"Maybe we found love"	

=== Voice acting ===
==== Anime ====
Year	Title	Role	Notes
2009	K-On!	Student	Episode 9
2010	Oreimo	Maid	Episode 2
2010	Kiddy Girl-and	Maid robot	Episode 13
2010	Seitokai Yakuindomo	Chiri Nakazato	Supporting role
2010	Night Raid 1931	Additional voices	
2010	Chu-Bra!!	Kojima	
2010	Motto To Love-Ru	Oku-chan	
2010	Dog Days	Rouge Clafoutis	Supporting role
2010	Trip Trek	Furuti	

==== Films ====
Year	Title	Role	Notes
2010	Keroro Gunso the Super Movie: Creation! Ultimate Keroro, Wonder Space-Time Island	Child	Voice

==== OVA ====
Year	Title	Role	Notes
2010	Kissxsis	Keita Suminoe (young)	
2011	Seitokai Yakuindomo	Chiri Nakazato, Misaki Amano	
2011	Five Numbers	Additional voices	
2011	Baby Princess	Nijiko Amatsuka	

==== Video games ====
Year	Title	Role	Notes
2010	Class of Heroes 2G		
2010	Dengeki no Pilot: Tenkū no Kizuna	Fiona	
2010	Love Once	Michiru Tsutsumi	
2011	Gal Gun	Kaname Nonomiya	
2011	Love Once: Mermaid's Tears	Michiru Tsutsumi	
2011	Growlanser Wayfarer of Time	Tricia	
2018	Destiny Child	Athena, Palas	

==== Drama CDs ====
Year	Title	Role	Notes
2009	Love Lab	Student	
2010	Fight! Don't Disappear!! Shikiso Usuko-san	Eiko Eshio	
2010	Goulart Knights Quatre Saisons Tsuki no Yuki Fubuki		
2010	A Certain Scientific Railgun Archives 3	Futaba	
2011	Dog Days	Rouge Clafoutis	

==== Radio ====
Year	Title	Role	Network	Notes
2009–2010	Dengeki no Pilot: Radio no Kizuna	Radio host		
2010–2011	A & G Next Generation Lady Go!!	Radio host	Nippon Cultural Broadcasting	With Shiori Mikami, Mikako Komatsu, Rumi Okubo, and Natsumi Takamori

== Discography ==
=== Studio albums ===
Title	Album details	Peak chart positions	Sales
Title	Album details	KOR	Sales
Soul Lady	Released: July 21, 2020; Label: Estimate Entertainment, Dreamus; Formats: CD, digital download, streaming	8	KOR: 7,563
Time-Lapse	Released: December 1, 2023; Label: Studio H2 Entertainment; Formats: CD, download, streaming	40	KOR: 3,951

=== Extended plays ===
Title	Album details	Peak chart positions	Sales
Title	Album details	KOR	Sales
Timeabout	Released: April 7, 2021; Label: Ubuntu Entertainment, YG Plus; Formats: CD, digital download, streaming	35	KOR: 8,446

=== Singles ===
==== As lead artist ====
Title	Year	Peak chart positions	Album
Title	Year	KOR DL	Album
"Neon" (네온)	2019	—	Soul Lady
"Cherries Jubiles" (좋아하고 있어요)	2019	—	Soul Lady
"Yesterday"	2020	—	Soul Lady
"Soul Lady" (서울여자)	2020	—	Soul Lady
"Lovemonth" (애월 (愛月))	2021	143	Timeabout
"Insomnia"	2021	149	Timeabout
"Loving You" (여자이고 싶은걸)	2021	132	Non-album singles
"Tokyo Lights"	2021	—	Non-album singles
"Scent" (향기)	2022	182	Non-album singles
"Space Science" (우주의 법칙)	2022	—	Non-album singles
"I Want to Be Closer to You"	2023	—	Time-Lapse
"—" denotes releases that did not chart or were not released in that region.

==== As featured artist ====
Title	Year	Album
"Feel Free" (FreeTEMPO featuring Yukika)	2021	Sekai

==== Promotional singles ====
Title	Year	Album
"Love in TV World" (TV를 켜요)	2020	Non-album singles
"What're You Doing Tonight?" (오늘 밤 뭐해?)	2021	Non-album singles

==== Collaborations ====
Title	Year	Album
"Starry Lights" (별빛) (with Jinjalim)	2021	Change Up
"The Moment" (그라데이션) (with Pat Lok)	2021	Non-album singles
"To the Light" (with nokdu)	2021	Non-album singles
"Moonset" (긴 밤) (with Kim Mijeong)	2022	Moonset with KozyPop

==== Soundtrack appearances ====
List of other works, showing year released, peak positions, and album name
Title	Year	Peak chart positions		Album
Title	Year	KOR DL	JPN	Album
"Happy Happy!" (ハピハピ！) (with Kayano Masuyama as Choco & Mimi)	2007	—	175	ChocoMimi OST
"Rocket" (ロケット) (with various artists (Note: Kayano Masuyama, Yuya Kido, Tōko Miura, Masahiro Usui as Choco & Mimi with Andrew, Mumu, Mikachin.))	2008	—	—	ChocoMimi OST
"Da yo ne Da yo ne" (だよねだよね) (Note: Credited as Kika (Real Girls Project).)	2018	—	—	Destiny's Child OST
"Please Me" (오늘 나를 부탁해)	2021	—	—	BnB OST: 20th Anniversary
"Curious" (속이 궁금해) (with Daybreak)	2021	111	—	Back to You OST
"—" denotes releases that did not chart or were not released in that region.

=== Guest appearances ===
List of non-single guest appearances with other performing artist(s)
Title	Year	Other artist(s)	Album
"Orange Road"	2020	Bronze	Aquarium
"Time Slip"	2022	Bronze	Skyline

=== Music videos ===
Year	Title	Director(s)
2019	"Neon"	Digipedi
2019	"Cherries Jubiles"	Digipedi
2020	"Soul Lady"	Digipedi
2021	"Insomnia"	Wanda (NDP)
2021	"여자이고 싶은걸 (loving you)"	임경환
2022	"Scent "	KozyPop, two_di
2023	"I Want to Be Closer to You"	TRYBE

== Awards and nominations ==
Name of the award ceremony, year presented, award category, nominee(s) of the award, and the result of the nomination
Award ceremony	Year	Category	Nominee(s)/work(s)	Result	Ref.
Korean Music Awards	2021	Best Pop Album	Soul Lady	Nominated	
Korean Music Awards	2021	Best Pop Song	"Soul Lady"	Nominated	
