= Blood Reign: Curse of the Yoma =

Manga

- Cover of Blood Reign: Curse of the Yoma as released by ADV Films

妖魔 (Yōma)
- Genre: Adventure, horror, supernatural
- Manga
- Written by: Kei Kusunoki
- Published by: Shueisha
- Magazine: Ribon Original
- Original run: 1985 – 1986
- Volumes: 1
- Original video animation
- Directed by: Takashi Anno
- Produced by: Eiji Abe; Nagateru Kato
- Written by: Shō Aikawa
- Music by: Hiroya Watanabe
- Studio: J.C.Staff
- Licensed by: NA: ADV Films
- Released: May 1, 1989 – June 1, 1989
- Runtime: 40 minutes (each)
- Episodes: 2

Blood Reign: Curse of the Yoma (妖魔, Yōma; "Ghost"), also known as Curse of the Undead: Yoma, is a Japanese manga written and illustrated by Kei Kusunoki. The manga was serialized in Shueisha's manga magazine Ribon Original from 1985 to 1986. The individual chapters were collected into a one-shot bound volume by Shueisha on February 18, 1998. The manga was adapted into an original video animation by Takashi Anno.

== Plot ==
A war has ravaged the land, and now, fueled by the blood of numerous fallen warriors the Yōma, demons from hell, emerge once more. A skilled ninja seeks to end the bloodshed these demons inflict upon humanity, but to do this he must fight against his undead former best friend and fellow ninja who was killed in battle and has been resurrected to serve the Yōma.

=== Hikage in an Evil World ===
The first part begins after what appears to be a fierce battle, with several ninja from the Takeda clan retrieving weapons from their fallen comrades and enemies. Two other Takeda ninja, Hikage and Marou, are observing the process until Marou begins acting strangely. He momentarily tries to attack Hikage before returning to normal, seemingly shocked and frightened by what he has just done. The pair make their way back to the Takeda camp. That night, the clan leader, Shingen Takeda, is attacked and killed by a Yōma. Shortly thereafter, Hikage learns from a Chūnin (a middle-ranking ninja) that Marou has deserted the Takeda and is at risk of exposing Shingen's death to other countries (i.e., other parts of Japan). He is ordered to track down Marou and eliminate him before word can spread, the Chūnin advising him to show no mercy, despite Hikage being his former best friend.

On his journey, Hikage is attacked by a pair of Iga ninja, whom he quickly dispatches. Later, while standing over a waterfall, Hikage reminisces about his childhood with Marou. He is brought out of his thoughts by an old man who claims he is "waiting to read Hikage's last rites." At the old shrine that the priest takes him to, he explains how people who have lost the will to live go to the waterfall to commit suicide by drowning themselves in the river below, and how he is there to comfort their souls. Knowing nothing of Marou's whereabouts, the priest advises that Hikage go to the village near the temple, as the sun will soon set. Hikage takes the advice and heads toward the village, encountering a young woman with a large scar on her left cheek along the way. The woman, named Aya, takes Hikage to the village and introduces him to several of the villagers, most prominently Taichi, a cheerful man who enjoys drinking and partying; and Ito, a woman with a suspicious air about her. During one of the villagers' parties, Hikage spots Marou for a brief instant, apparently entering a hut in the village, but is unable to find him in the following days, despite his intensive searching. One night, he meets with two of his fellow Takeda ninja to explain why he is staying in the village. After hearing he has seen Marou, and explaining to Hikage that this is where Marou's trail stops, they allow him to continue investigating the village, but remind him that he must show no mercy toward Marou.

The following night, Hikage sees Aya suffering from a nightmare. He holds her to try and comfort her, but immediately hears screaming coming from the forest. He rushes to the source of the screaming only to find Taichi and one of the Takeda ninja he spoke with earlier dead, along with another badly injured Takeda ninja. A spider Yōma attacks, but Hikage uses shuriken to drive it off, seeing a brief, transparent vision of Marou in the Yōma's wake. Before dying, the injured ninja reveals that Marou is a "child born of the ground" and that everyone in the Takeda village knew about it, but never discussed it. Left with this mystery, Hikage confronts Aya with Taichi's death, only for her to deny it. When Aya goes to her house to store some water, she hears Ito's voice asking her to do her a favor that night. Hikage goes down to the riverbank to find that the bodies of Taichi and the dead ninja, along with the bloodstains and weapons, have disappeared without explanation. Hikage hears Aya singing unusually late that night and goes to investigate. He finds Aya being held in a different spider Yōma's mandibles and attacks it. It drops Aya, but soon runs away with Hikage in pursuit. He arrives at the temple and finds the priest from the waterfall standing before him on the path. He tells Hikage that he is erasing the villager's memories in order to ripen them for Kikuga no Miko's (the demon lord Yōma of the land) revival after revealing the fact that he was the spider Yōma from before. On the verge of death from a short battle, the priest/Yōma warns Hikage about the suicide of the entire village should he die, which Hikage proceeds to kill him anyway. Aya wakes up and remembers how she got her scar, the priest's spell having worn off when he died. It was assumed that she drowned herself. Hikage finds a seemingly unconscious Ito and rushes to her aide. However, she wakes up and restrains Hikage but he was able to kill her also. Hikage enters the shrine and destroys the Buddha statue to reveal an egg that he quickly cuts open. The egg opens to reveal Marou feasting on Taichi's severed head. A speechless Hikage approaches him, but Marou attacks him, causing the entire building to come crashing down. Outside, a fully dressed Marou walks away, giving the broken building a final glance before departing.

The next morning it is pouring rain. Reflecting on the night's events, Hikage suddenly remembers Aya and finds her body in the river only to find her dead. He returns to the village to find it wrecked and all of the inhabitants dead. An acquaintance of his, Kazami, arrives, telling Hikage that the Oda and Uesugi clans have found out about Shingen's death and that he does not need to pursue Marou anymore. Despite this, due to feeling guilt over not being able to save Aya and still seeking answers to why Marou betrayed their clan and became a Yōma, Hikage leaves to continue his quest in search for his old friend.

=== Maoru with Crazy Fang ===
Two years have passed since Hikage traveled to the west in pursuit of Marou, yet has not had any leads on his whereabouts. While on a beach, a kunoichi approaches him but Hikage quickly learns she is being chased by a group of ninja from the Kōga clan, led by Shiranui, who accused the kunoichi for killing their leader. She denies having anything to do with it, and soon Hikage ends up fighting them as well. Shiranui stumbles into the ocean from the defeat and is trampled to death by Majumi no Miko, the demon lord of the sea. Hikage asks for Marou's whereabouts, only for Majumi to mock their friendship. Angered, Hikage attacks Majumi and barely manages to escape. Meanwhile, Marou converses with Shiratsuyu, a snake Yōma, on what to do about the war between the Oda and Takeda clans. Marou orders Shiratsuyu to kill Hikage while he turns Mikawa into a "living hell".

The kunoichi, later revealing her name to be Aya, travels with Hikage to a nearby village that has seemingly been untouched by the war. Aya goes to one of the villager's huts to stay for the night but soon comes upon a headless baby and the two learn that the entire village is dead, yet still walking. The village is shown to be in ruins and the two spend the night in a wrecked hut. The next day, Hikage leaves Aya behind and continues his search. He runs into and battles Shiratsuyu, along with Mai, a female butterfly Yōma, and a tree Yōma, Yoki. Meanwhile, Aya, upset that Hikage left her behind, encounters Kotone, a spirit of a woman. They talk briefly before Yoki captures them to gain an advantage over Hikage. With some difficulty, Hikage slays Mai and Yoki. Shiratsuyu, on the other hand, is possessed by Kotone and vanishes.

After traveling for a while with no recent Yōma attacks, Kazami appears before Hikage and attacks him. He claims to have been ordered by Katsuyori Takeda, the Takeda clan's new head, to kill him in order for Kikuga to be willing to lend them the power of the Yōma. After a hesitation, Kazami is mortally wounded by Hikage as a result. He expresses no true desire to kill Hikage and does not wish for the power of the Yōma. As it turns out, Marou only told the Takeda that he would help them in order to create more hatred and grudges during the final battle at Mount Nagashino. During which, the entire Takeda clan was decimated by the Oda, leaving Hikage no home to return to.

Hikage gathers his supplies and plans to head to Mount Nagashino. Aya begs him to abandon his desire to hunt Marou and for him to stay with her, but he does not listen, leaving a sobbing Aya behind. Upon his arrival at the battlefield, Hikage fights off rock formation of hands before meeting face-to-face with Marou, the former asking why he has become Kikuga. He mocks his former friend and explained that he grew tired of living as a ninja and rationalizes his change into Kikuga. He justifies sparing Hikage's life so that he would eventually join him as a Yōma, thereby transcending humanity. Maru puts Hikage in a trance and proceeds with Hikage's Yōma transformation but he awakes when Aya calls out to him despite being trapped by rock hand formations. Marou, upon seeing his friend's refusal, transforms into a red-eyed wolf-faced Yōma. He is joined by Majumi and proposes the two be joined. Aya wraps her wires around Majumi attempting to stop it, but it dragged her along the ground and stomped on her face, knocking her out. The two demon lords then dissolve and merge into a creature resembling a wolf and a centaur. It is shown to have control over land and can use telekinesis to break objects and hold Hikage in place. Knocking Hikage from a cliff, Marou again proposes that Hikage joins them as a Yōma. But when he again refused, a frustrated Marou attacks and blinds him. Hikage manages to cut Maru from Majumi, reverting Maru back to his original Yōma. Moaning in pain, Marou reminisces the two of them as kids running through the fields. He remains distracted long enough for Hikage to slice his throat, ending the threat of Kikuga and the Yōma. Marou, back in his human form, turns to face Hikage, who warmly smiles and offers his hand. Before Marou can grasp it, he falls over dead, and within moments Hikage collapses as well. The ground beneath the former demon king crumbles and he falls into the darkness, leaving his childhood friend alone and unconscious.

Later, Hikage awakens in a hut with a fire burning. He sees Aya just returning with water and speculates that she was the one who carried him back. She is now sporting a large scar on her left cheek similar to that of the original Aya, which was caused by Majumi. She becomes ashamed but is comforted by Hikage who accepts her for who is. In the netherworld, Marou's corpse lays still as Kotone, still possessing Shiratsuyu, comes towards him. A flashback reveals that Marou was her lover. Kotone decides to give Marou her life-force so that he can be reborn and then disappears.

Some time later, Hikage and Aya have resumed their travels. They stumble upon a dead woman and her newborn son, who is crying hysterically. Aya picks up the infant and calms him; Hikage stares at the baby boy for an inordinate amount of time. Marou's voice is heard, telling Hikage that being a human is "so boring".

== Characters ==
Hikage

- Voiced by: Kenyu Horiuchi (Japanese); Christopher Pryce (English)

The main protagonist of the series, Hikage is a young ninja who is sent on a mission by the Takeda clan to eliminate Marou. Though loyal to the ninja clan he was raised in as well as following orders to the letter, he still deeply cares for his childhood friend and is greatly troubled and confused by his sudden betrayal. The night of the betrayal, Hikage received a small scar under his left eye due to being scratched by a poison shuriken that his friend threw at him. He finds a love interest in a young village woman named Aya and later a kunoichi by the same name. Despite his young age, Hikage is greatly skilled in the use of swordsmenship, as well as the usage of several other weapons.
Marou / Kikuga no Miko

- Voiced by: Kaneto Shiozawa (Japanese); Jon Geiger (normal form), Dick Reiss (1st Yōma form), and Charles Campbell (2nd Yōma form) (English)

The series' main antagonist, Marou was Hikage's childhood friend and fellow ninja in the Takeda clan. According to him, he was born from the start as the demon king of the land, Kikuga no Miko, by taking the form of an infant human body as well as being "born of the ground". However, needing human sacrifices to fully awaken as Kikuga, Marou fled his village and had the spider Yōma gather human sacrifices to feed him while he slept in a cacoon. He emerges just when Hikage disturbs his rest and departs. Kikuga plans on fusing with Majumi no Miko so that the world will be taken over by Yōma as well as for humans to "transcend humanity". Though the two demon kings merge into a wolf-centaur hybrid powerful enough to destroy the world, they are still defeated and killed by Hikage during the final battle. He is reincarnated as a baby by his deceased lover Kotone, whom he killed after losing control as Marou, and is taken in by Hikage and Aya.
Aya

- Voiced by: Hiromi Tsuru (1st) and Mina Tominaga (2nd) (Japanese); Catherine Glynn (1st) and Jessica Robertson (2nd) (English)

Aya refers to two women depicted in the OVA series. The first is a young woman who lives in the village where nobody can remember their past. She has a large scar on her cheek. Its origin is never exactly revealed, but it was apparently traumatic enough for her to lose her will to live. Hikage develops romantic feelings for her, but it is never expressly stated that she feels the same. She is used by Ito to lure Hikage out so that she can kill him, but the plan fails and immediately results in a battle. Hikage forgets about Aya until it is too late and cannot prevent her from drowning herself. After the battle in the shrine, Hikage finds Aya's corpse and cries over her loss.
The second Aya is a kunoichi from the Kōga clan of ninjas. She is hunted down by members of her clan for killing their leader (though she insists that she did not do it) and is rescued from them and Majumi no Miko by Hikage. Though annoyed by him at first, she quickly warms up and falls in love with him as they continue journeying together. After a series of battles against the Yōma and the death of Kazami, Aya tries to dissuade Hikage from his quest to find Marou, but to no avail. She follows him anyway and has her face stomped on by Majumi, and is knocked out for the rest of the final battle as a result. After the battle has ended, Aya, now sporting a scar similar to the one that the first Aya had, is relieved to see that Hikage has survived, and embraces him. They take in the infant reincarnated Marou and raise him.

Kotone

- Voiced by: Yuko Mizutani (Japanese); Cara Biggs (English)

The deceased lover of Marou, Kotone was killed by Marou during his journey before becoming Kikuga no Miko. Though he told her to run, Marou lost control of his body while slaughtering a village and sliced Kotone's heart, killing her. She is the first to realize that Aya is in love with Hikage. Kotone rescues the two by possessing the snake Yōma, Shiratsuyu, and disappearing. When the final battle between Hikage and Marou has ended, Kotone approaches Marou and gives him her lifeforce so that he can be reborn.
Kazami

- Voiced by: Hideyuki Tanaka (Japanese); David Arnsberger (English)

Kazami is Hikage's other friend and immediate superior within the Takeda clan. Though he tells Hikage that there is no need to chase Marou after the Takeda's enemies get wind of their leader's death, he allows his friend to continue the search. Later, Kazami is sent by Katsuyori to meet with Kikuga so that the Takeda can barrow the power of the Yōma. Kikuga will only allow it if Kazami can kill Hikage. Though he confronts him, Kazami can not bring himself to kill his friend and allows Hikage to fatally stab him so that neither of them will spread more hatred for the Yōma.
Majumi no Miko

- Voiced by: Jurota Kosugi (Japanese); Adam Dudley (English)

The demon king of the sea, Majumi is a Yōma that takes the form of a flesh-eating white horse. He plans on merging with his fellow terrestrial demon lord, Kikuga no Miko, so that all the monsters in the world can be revived. Majumi battles Hikage on a beach and in an ocean but is killed. He is later revived during the final confrontation between Kikuga and Hikage and stomps on Aya, giving her a scar. The two demons merge into a wolf-centaur-like creature powerful enough to control the world, but still are killed by Hikage during their final showdown.
Shiratsuyu

- Voiced by: Kozo Shioya (Japanese); Bill Wise (English)

A Yōma that takes the appearance of a white snake, Shiratsuyu is approved by Kikuga to kill Hikage after the latter kills Majumi. Along with Mai and Yoki, he plans a trap by taking Aya and Kotone hostage. However, it fails when Mai and Yoki are killed by Hikage and Kotone possess Shiratsuyu's body, destroying his soul and only reappearing when she reincarnates Marou.

== Music ==
The series uses two pieces of theme music: Yōma Kazoe Uta (妖魔数え歌, lit. 'Ghost Counting Song') by Mami Nakizoto is the series' opening theme, while Ashita he no Purorōgu (未来へのプロローグ, lit. 'Prologue for Tomorrow') by Midori Karashima is the series' ending theme.

== Releases ==
In Japan, the series was released on VHS on May 1, 1989. ADV Films released the VHS on November 11, 1998. The OVAs two episodes were released on May 1 and June 1, 1989, respectively in North America by ADV Films and aired on Encore Action, in France by Manga, in Germany by OVA Films and in Russia by MC Entertainment. The OVAs were rebroadcast in an anime marathon by Encore Action on November 4, 2000.

== Reception ==
DVD Verdict criticised Blood Reign: Curse of the Yoma for its "limpid animation and static imagery" and quality of the DVD release. Mania.com's Chris Beveridge compared Blood Reign: Curse of the Yoma with Wrath of the Ninja for its ninja protagonists. THEM Anime's Carlos Ross criticizes the characterization but commends the dated graphics and the action. Sequential Tart's Sheena McNeil commends the OVA with "Blood Reign is a delightfully eerie movie. The mythology it provides gives some meat to the story while the well-developed characters give it life." Otaku USA's Paul Thomas Chapman commends the OVA, stating that he "[loves] the sense of psycho-geography that pervades Blood Reign, for in these OVAs the world itself has gone mad, transforming into a psychedelic backdrop that blurs the boundaries between the lands of the living and the dead. In Blood Reign, the days are a burnt umber blasted by an angry sun; the nights are rife with purple shadows and ghastly greens. The very environment is menacing, each rock and tree alive with goblin-faces that seem to smirk at the thought of drawing human blood."
