= ChocoMimi =

Media franchise based on manga series of the same name

- Cover of the Japanese version of vol. 1, first released on July 15, 2005

チョコミミ (Chokomimi)
- Genre: Comedy, yonkoma
- Manga
- Written by: Konami Sonoda
- Published by: Shueisha
- English publisher: NA: Viz Media
- Imprint: Ribon Mascot Comics
- Magazine: Ribon Original (2003-2004); Ribon (2004-2019)
- Original run: 17 May 2003 – August 2019
- Volumes: 11
- Television drama
- Directed by: Yoka Kusano
- Produced by: Norio Yamakawa
- Written by: Saeki Nejime
- Music by: Cher Watanabe
- Studio: DLE
- Original network: TV Tokyo
- Original run: 1 October 2007 – 21 March 2008
- Episodes: 26

ChocoMimi (チョコミミ, Chokomimi') is a Japanese manga series written and illustrated by Konami Sonoda. It was first serialized in the magazine Ribon Original in 2003 and was moved to the main Ribon magazine in March 2004. The series was put on hiatus in the September 2019 issue of Ribon due to Sonoda's health and remains unfinished after her death on August 4, 2019, from breast cancer.

In Japan, the series was popular among elementary and junior high school students, with critics citing the fashion focus and emphasis on friendship as its strong points. The popularity of the series led to a live-action television drama adaptation in 2007.

== Plot ==
ChocoMimi follows the daily lives of best friends Choco and Mimi, two fashionable junior high girls, as well as their own social circle and family. While Choco is serious and diligent, spoiled sweet Mimi is imaginative and spacey. Together, they experience and explore everyday problems at home, with their friends, and at school. Each chapter ends with a fashion tip from both Choco and Mimi.

== Characters ==
=== Main characters ===
Chiyoko Sakurai (桜井 ちよこ, Sakurai Chiyoko) / Choco (チョコ)
Voiced by: Ami Koshimizu; portrayed by Yukika Teramoto (TV series)
Choco is a gentle and reliable teenager who does well in school and has a liking for fashion. She is best friends with Mimi and often tries to serve as a figure of responsibility amidst the former's antics. She enjoys cooking and creating crafts. Some jokes in the manga revolve around her poor singing and drawing abilities. Her family runs a cafe called the March Rabbit; she herself hopes to find a future by opening her own cafe. Born on May 5th. Blood Type A.
Mimi Nekota (猫田 ミミ, Nekota Mimi)
Voiced by: Ai Nonaka; portrayed by Kayano Masuyama (TV series)
Mimi is a carefree, optimistic girl. She is a poor student and often tries to slide out from working on her schoolwork, but she has a wild, amusing imagination. Most of her daydreams consist of finding true loves and secret worlds. She claims Mikami is her "dream prince," although she is shown to have feelings towards Mumu. She owns a plush bear toy named Pirate Bear (カイゾクグマ, Kaizoku Kuma), a recurring mascot in the manga. Born on March 3rd. Blood Type AB.
Ryūnosuke Andō (安藤 竜之介, Andō Ryūnosuke) / Andrew (アンドリュー, Andoryū)
Voiced by: Takayuki Sasada; portrayed by Yuya Kido (TV series)
Andō is a transfer student from Osaka who is quiet and plays guitar in a band. He is intimidating at first glance, but he is kind and cares deeply for animals. He is good friends with Choco, although their relationship becomes awkward at times due to their feelings for each other. Born on November 3rd. Blood Type O.
Mumu Momoyama (桃山 ムム, Momoyama Mumu)
Voiced by: Motoki Takagi; portrayed by Tōko Miura (TV series)
A mischievous student with a self-centered attitude that causes him to constantly clash with Mimi. He has a very cute, feminine appearance that he takes pride in. He has feelings for Mimi and gets easily jealous when Mimi tends to favor Mikami instead of himself. He adores Mimi's dog, Chiffon. Like Mimi, he is a poor student and despises school and homework. He owns a plush bear toy named Death Bear (デスベアー, Desu Bea), a counterpart to Mimi's Pirate Bear. Born on August 20th. Blood Type B.
Kōmei Mikami (三上 功明, Mikami Kōmei) / Mikachin (ミカちん)
Portrayed by: Masahiro Usui (TV series)
Ando's classmate whom Mimi compares to a prince. He is a good student and does well academically, but he is rather air-headed and prone to making bizarre comments. He is Mr. Take's nephew. Born on October 22nd. Blood Type AB.
Kojika Mori (森 小鹿, Mori Kojika) / Bambi (バンビ)
Portrayed by: Ayame Gouriki (TV series)
Bambi is Ando's level-headed, tomboyish childhood friend. She loves singing and playing sports. She has slight feelings for Ando but puts them aside for Choco and Ando's relationship. In spite of this, she is very close to Choco and gets along well with the rest of the group. Born on April 12th. Blood Type A.

=== Other characters ===
Masato Takeda (竹田 正人, Takeda Masato) / Mr. Take (タケちゃん, Take-chan)
Portrayed by: Taro Suwa (TV series)
Choco, Mimi, and Mumu's homeroom teacher. He is constantly exasperated by Mimi's shortcomings and is often frustrated with her inability to concentrate on her studies. He is also the uncle of Mikami and Aoi. Born on September 23rd. Blood Type A.
Misaki Tsubakiyama (椿山 美咲, Tsubakiyama Misaki)
Misaki is a third-year student and Choco and Mimi's senior. She is very pretty, but is rather eccentric. At times, she behaves in an outlandish, almost stalker-like manner due to her extreme crush on Mr. Take, which often disturbs the others. She was introduced in the fourth volume. Born on February 14th. Blood Type B.
Abe (阿部くん, Abe-kun) / Captain (キャプテン)
Abe is a third-year student who is the captain of the soccer team. He is friendly and has a crush on Choco. He remains on good terms with her and her friends even after she turns him down.
Yamada (山田くん, Yamada-kun)
A classmate of Choco and Mimi who is extremely popular in their class. He has a crush on Misaki and has been in love with her since he saw her at the entrance ceremony. He does not understand Misaki's obsession with Mr. Take.
Maho Kawai (河合 真帆, Kawai Maho) / Maho-Maho (マホマホ)
Maho-Maho is Mimi's old friend from her childhood. They knew each other when they were young and had made a promise to marry each other, although Mimi has forgotten about it. Mumu is jealous of him. He is honest, though not very bright, which pleases Mimi to see that someone is duller than herself. He works in the library with Mikami. He was introduced in the sixth volume.
Sae Kiguchi (木口サエ, Kiguchi Sae)
A shy and pessimistic first-year student who has a crush on Mumu. She was friendless before meeting Mumu and the gang. She was introduced in the seventh volume.
Remi Kinosaki (城崎レミ, Kinosaki Remi) / Remi-sama (レミ様)
A beautiful but narcissistic first-year student. She is constantly competing with Mumu over who has the best appearance. She claims that she will not fall in love with any other person because she is in love with herself. She was introduced in the seventh volume.

=== Family members ===
Mimi's father (ミミの父, Mimi no chichi)
Portrayed by: Kousei Amano (TV series)
Mimi's father who dotes on her and honors her every request. He becomes upset whenever she is disappointed in his actions.
Jin Sakurai (桜井 仁, Sakurai Jin)
Portrayed by: Reo Sawada (TV series)
Choco's energetic, youngest brother in the fifth grade. He and Ando get along very well with each other due their hobby of playing video games. He has a crush on Aoi. Born on November 23rd. Blood Type O.
Rai Sakurai (桜井 礼, Sakurai Rai)
Choco's second younger brother. He is usually poker-faced and very stoic; the others often comment on how he does not look related to his siblings. He is a year younger than Choco. Mimi and Mumu often tease him by calling him the name "Rachel," which he dislikes. He is often compared to Ando on their similar appearances and behaviors. He was introduced in the fourth volume. Born on January 1st. Blood Type A.
Aoi Mikami (三上 葵, Mikami Aoi)
Portrayed by: Kana Okunoyama (TV series)
Mikami's sweet younger sister, whom Jin has a crush on. She is a year older than Jin and loves reading. Born on April 29th. Blood Type A.

=== Animals ===
Chiffon (シフォン, Shifon)
Voiced by: Aya Ozaki (TV series)
Mimi's pet dog who communicates in an archaic dialect. He dislikes it when Mimi dresses him up, as he believes himself to be a samurai.
Huckleberry (ハックルベリー, Hakkuruberī)
Voiced by: Sachi Kumada (TV series)
Choco's sassy, female pet cat.
Picho (ピッチョ, Picho)
Ando's female pet chick, whom he constantly dotes on.
Anko (アンコ, Anko)
A kitten that was found by Choco and Mimi at school, whom Mumu takes in. His real name is Dark Rose Prince Black Requiem Dark Soul II (暗黒のバラ王子ブラックレクイエムダークソウルII世, Ankoku no bara oji burakku rekuiemu dāku sōru II-sei), but Mumu calls him "Anko" in public out of embarrassment.

== Media ==
=== Manga ===
ChocoMimi debuted on Ribon Original in 2003. After the magazine became defunct in 2004, it was moved to Ribon. The chapters were later released in bound volumes by Shueisha for a total of 11 volumes under the Ribon Mascot Comics imprint. Sonoda put the series on hiatus beginning the September 2019 issue due to health issues and later died from breast cancer on August 4, 2019.

Viz Media licensed the series in English and released the first five volumes under their Viz Kids imprint. The first volume was released with a sticker set.

No.	Original release date	Original ISBN	English release date	English ISBN
1	July 15, 2005	4-08-856624-6	July 7, 2009	978-1421527581
2	June 15, 2006	4-08-856690-4	October 6, 2009	978-1421527598
3	September 14, 2007	978-4-08-856769-3	January 5, 2010	978-1421527604
4	June 13, 2008	978-4-08-856820-1	April 6, 2010	978-1421529004
5	October 15, 2009	978-4-08-867014-0	November 2, 2010	978-1421536675
6	October 15, 2010	978-4-08-867078-2	—	—
7	March 15, 2013	978-4-08-867259-5	—	—
8	November 25, 2015	978-4-08-867396-7	—	—
9	November 25, 2016	978-4-08-867437-7	—	—
10	December 25, 2017	978-4-08-867482-7	—	—
11	January 25, 2019	978-4-08-867530-5	—	—

=== Drama CD ===
A drama CD adaptation featuring ChocoMimi, along with Love-Berrish! and Animal Yokochō, was released as a mail-order gift with the December 2005 issue of Ribon, featuring the voices of Ami Koshimizu as Choco, Ai Nonaka as Mimi, Takayuki Sasada as Ando, and Motoki Takagi as Mumu.

=== Television drama ===
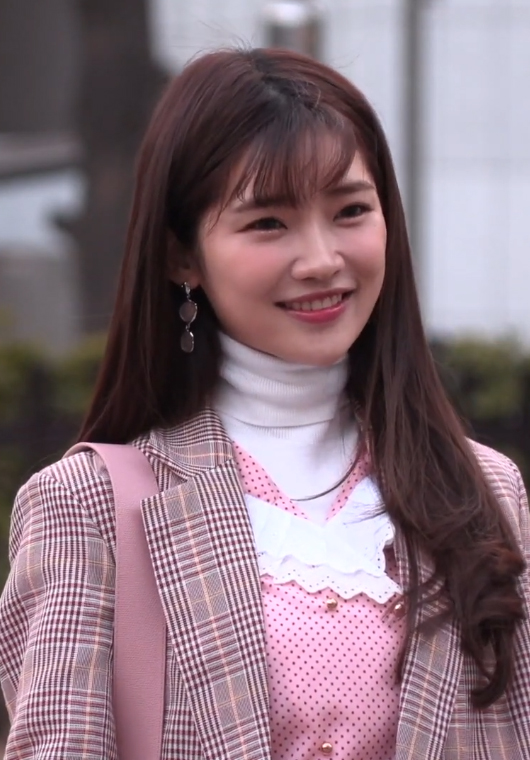
Yukika Teramoto (pictured 2019) starred as Choco in the live-action TV drama

The manga was adapted into a live-action television drama series. The series was directed by Yoka Kusano and aired weekly for 26 episodes on TV Tokyo from October 1, 2007, to March 31, 2008, at 5:30 PM. Each episode was divided into two parts and used flash animation for effects and animated segments. ChocoMimi starred a number of child and teen newcomer actors, with its main cast composed of Yukika Teramoto as Choco, AKB48 member Kayano Masuyama as Mimi, Yuya Kido as Andrew, Tōko Miura as Mumu, and Masahiro Usui as Mikachin.

The opening theme, "Happy Happy!", was performed by Teramoto and Masuyama under the name Choco & Mimi, which charted #175 on the Oricon Weekly Singles Chart upon release. The ending themes are "I Can't!!" by Mystic for episodes 1–13; and "Rocket" by Teramoto, Masuyama, Yuya Kido, Tōko Miura, and Masahiro Usui under the name Choco & Mimi with Andrew, Mumu, and Mikachin for episodes 14–26.

==== Episodes ====
No.	Title	Written by	Original release date
1	"Choco and Mimi"; Transliteration: "Choko to Mimi" (Japanese: チョコとミミ)	Unknown	October 1, 2007
1	"The Transfer Student"; Transliteration: "Tenkōsei" (Japanese: テンコウセイ)	Unknown	October 1, 2007
Mimi gets into various misunderstandings with Mr. Take and gets poor grades at school, causing Choco to help her out. Choco gets off to a bad start with Ando, a new transfer student, while Mimi misinterprets the Buddha's third eye as a pimple that appears when thinking of a love interest.
2	"Telepathy"; Transliteration: "Ishin Denshin" (Japanese: イシンデンシン)	Unknown	October 8, 2007
2	"The Crescent Moon Brooch"; Transliteration: "Mikazuki Burōchi" (Japanese: 三日月ブローチ)	Unknown	October 8, 2007
3	"Mumu, the Beautiful Girl"; Transliteration: "Bishōjo Mumu-chan" (Japanese: 美少女ムムちゃん)	Unknown	October 15, 2007
3	"Who's the Little Devil?"; Transliteration: "Koakuma wa Docchi?" (Japanese: 小悪魔はどっち？)	Unknown	October 15, 2007
4	"In the Halloween Night"; Transliteration: "Harouin no Yoru ni" (Japanese: ハロウィンの夜に)	Unknown	October 22, 2007
4	"Mimi and Mr. Take"; Transliteration: "Mimi to Take-chan" (Japanese: ミミとタケちゃん)	Unknown	October 22, 2007
5	"A Small Picnic"; Transliteration: "Puchi Pikunikku" (Japanese: プチピクニック)	Unknown	October 29, 2007
5	"Happy Birthday"; Transliteration: "Happī Bāsudei" (Japanese: ハッピーバースデイ)	Unknown	October 29, 2007
6	"Study Hard"; Transliteration: "Mou Benkyō" (Japanese: モウベンキョウ)	Unknown	November 5, 2007
6	"The Prince Next Door"; Transliteration: "Tonari no Ōji-sama" (Japanese: トナリの王子さま)	Unknown	November 5, 2007
7	"House Visit"; Transliteration: "Katei Houmon" (Japanese: カテイホウモン)	Unknown	November 12, 2007
7	"The Name of the Kind Flower"; Transliteration: "Yasashī Hana no Namae" (Japanese: 優しい花の名前)	Unknown	November 12, 2007
8	"Bambi"; Transliteration: "Banbi" (Japanese: バンビ)	Unknown	November 19, 2007
8	"A Report on Boys"; Transliteration: "Otokonoko Hakusho" (Japanese: 男の子白書)	Unknown	November 19, 2007
9	"Special"; Transliteration: "Tokubetsu" (Japanese: トクベツ)	Unknown	November 26, 2007
9	"A Rival?!"; Transliteration: "Raibaru!?" (Japanese: ライバル！？)	Unknown	November 26, 2007
10	"Let's Make a Band!"; Transliteration: "Bando Yarōze!" (Japanese: バンドやろうZE！)	Unknown	December 3, 2007
10	"Author Unknown"; Transliteration: "Yomibito Shirazu" (Japanese: ヨミビトシラズ)	Unknown	December 3, 2007
11	"A Part-time Job?"; Transliteration: "Arubaito?" (Japanese: アルバイト？)	Unknown	December 10, 2007
11	"What I Want to Be"; Transliteration: "Naritai Mono" (Japanese: なりたいもの)	Unknown	December 10, 2007
12	"Jingle Bells"; Transliteration: "Jinguru Beru" (Japanese: ジングルベル」)	Unknown	December 17, 2007
12	"Sunday"; Transliteration: "Nichiyōbi" (Japanese: ニチヨウビ)	Unknown	December 17, 2007
13	"Deciding on a Vocalist!"; Transliteration: "Bōkaru Kettei!" (Japanese: ボーカル決定！)	Unknown	December 24, 2007
13	"The Leaf of Happiness"; Transliteration: "Shiawase no Happa" (Japanese: 幸せのはっぱ)	Unknown	December 24, 2007
14	"New School Term"; Transliteration: "Shingakki" (Japanese: シンガッキ」)	Unknown	January 7, 2008
14	"Diet!"; Transliteration: "Daietto!" (Japanese: ダイエット！)	Unknown	January 7, 2008
15	"Love Song"; Transliteration: "Koi Uta" (Japanese: コイウタ)	Unknown	January 14, 2008
15	"DJ Mumu" (Japanese: DJムム)	Unknown	January 14, 2008
16	"Go For it, Mr. Take!"; Transliteration: "Ganbare Take-chan!" (Japanese: がんばれタケちゃん！)	Unknown	January 21, 2008
16	"The Girl and the Horoscope"; Transliteration: "Otome to Horosukōpu" (Japanese: オトメとホロスコープ)	Unknown	January 21, 2008
17	"Bean-throwing Festival"; Transliteration: "Setsubun" (Japanese: セツブン)	Unknown	January 28, 2008
17	"The Library Room"; Transliteration: "Toshishitsu" (Japanese: トショシツ)	Unknown	January 28, 2008
18	"Love Glasses"; Transliteration: "Koisuru Megane" (Japanese: 恋するメガネ)	Unknown	February 4, 2008
18	"Two Billion"; Transliteration: "Nijūoku" (Japanese: ニジュウオク)	Unknown	February 4, 2008
19	"Valentine"; Transliteration: "Barentain" (Japanese: バレンタイン)	Unknown	February 11, 2008
19	"Another Valentine"; Transliteration: "Mou Hitotsu no Barentain" (Japanese: もう一つのバレンタイン)	Unknown	February 11, 2008
20	"The Mikami Family"; Transliteration: "Mikami-ke no Hitobito" (Japanese: 三上家の人々)	Unknown	February 18, 2008
20	"Heart to Heart"; Transliteration: "Omoi to Omoi" (Japanese: オモイ×オモイ)	Unknown	February 18, 2008
21	"Study Group"; Transliteration: "Benkyō-kai" (Japanese: ベンキョウカイ)	Unknown	February 25, 2008
21	"The Swallowtail Butterfly"; Transliteration: "Ageha" (Japanese: アゲハ)	Unknown	February 25, 2008
22	"The 3rd of March"; Transliteration: "San-gatsu San-ka" (Japanese: 3ガツ3カ)	Unknown	March 3, 2008
22	"Curry Party"; Transliteration: "Karē Pātī" (Japanese: カレーパーティー)	Unknown	March 3, 2008
23	"White Day"; Transliteration: "Howaito Dē" (Japanese: ホワイトデー)	Unknown	March 10, 2008
23	"Another White Day"; Transliteration: "Mou Hitotsu no Howaito Dē" (Japanese: もう一つのホワイトデー)	Unknown	March 10, 2008
24	"Girls Be Ambitious!"; Transliteration: "Gāruzu Bī Anbishasu!" (Japanese: ガールズビーアンビシャス！)	Unknown	March 17, 2008
24	"My Girl"; Transliteration: "Mai Gāru" (Japanese: マイガール)	Unknown	March 17, 2008
25	"Your Voice"; Transliteration: "Kimi no Koe" (Japanese: キミノコエ)	Unknown	March 24, 2008
25	"Collapse of the Band?"; Transliteration: "Bando Hōkai?" (Japanese: バンド崩壊？)	Unknown	March 24, 2008
26	"Practice Hard"; Transliteration: "Mou Renshū" (Japanese: モウレンシュウ)	Unknown	March 31, 2008
26	"On Stage!"; Transliteration: "On Sutēji!" (Japanese: オンステージ！)	Unknown	March 31, 2008

== Reception ==
In Japan, ChocoMimi was popular among its target demographic of elementary and junior high students. The fashion focus of the series has been compared to Love and Berry: Dress Up and Dance!, while Choco and Mimi's friendship was compared to Nana and Hachi's from Nana. Lori Henderson from School Library Journal reviewed the series favorably, approving of its "short and sweet" stories and emphasis on friendship, while recommending the series to children in the 9-12 age group. On the other hand, Katherine Dacey from School Library Journal criticized Choco and Mimi's characterization for enforcing negative stereotypes of teen girls as "materialistic, ditzy, and uninterested in school" and felt "bothered" about the stories where Choco and Mimi were concerned about their weight. Publishers Weekly recommended the series specifically to preteen girls, especially ones interested in Japanese culture.
