= Yuki Sato (voice actor) =

Japanese actor and voice actor

- 佐藤 佑暉
- Born: Kanagawa Prefecture, Japan
- Other name: Hiroyuki Satō
- Education: Tokai University
- Occupations: Actor; voice actor
- Years active: 1986–present
- Agent: Aoni Production

Yuki Sato (佐藤 佑暉, Satō Yūki), also credited as Hiroyuki Satō (佐藤浩之, Satō Hiroyuki), is a Japanese actor and voice actor from Kanagawa Prefecture, Japan. He is represented by Aoni Production.

== Filmography ==
=== Anime ===
List of voice performances in anime
Year	Series	Role	Notes	Source
1988–97	Legend of the Galactic Heroes	Sanders	OVA	
1989	Transformers: Victory	Mach, Drill Horn	aired on NTV	
1989–96	Yanki Reppu-Tai	Takizawa	OVA	
1990	Brave Exkaiser	Kumiko's Manager		
1990	Magical Taruruto-kun	Motorcycle Gang		
1990	Yagami-kun no Katei no Jijō	Yuzo Miyake	OVA	
1991–92	3×3 Eyes	Tatsuya	OVA	
1991	Mobile Suit Gundam F91	Kane Song		
1992–96	Sailor Moon series	Motoki Furuhata		
1992	The Bush Baby	Maurice		
1993	Aoki Densetsu Shoot!	Shouji Hattori		
1993	Rokudenashi Blues	Hironari Komiyama		
1994	Captain Tsubasa J	Shun Nitta		
1995	Romeo's Blue Skies	Leo, Panio		
1996	Dragon Ball GT	Neji/Super Σ		
1999	Gokudo	Tei		
1999–2000	Blue Gender	Tony Frost		
2002	Ultimate Muscle	Rikishiman, Apollonman		
	Lady! Lady!	Mark	aired on TBS	
	Kariagekun	Tachikawa	aired on CX	

=== Video games ===
List of voice performances in video games
Year	Series	Role	Notes	Source
	KOF: Maximum Impact series	Alba Meira		

=== Overseas dubbing ===
List of voice performances in overseas dubbing
Year	Series	Role	Notes	Source
1991–2007	Thomas the Tank Engine & Friends	Donald, 'Arry, Harold	Seasons 2-8 only, succeeded 'Arry from Moriya Endo	
2000	Thomas and the Magic Railroad	Harold		

=== Other dubbing ===
List of voice performances in other dubbing
Year	Series	Role	Notes	Source
	Ultraman Cosmos	Ultraman Cosmos		
	U-otchi	Narration		
	Go! Go! Connie-chan	Tomorokoshi-kun		
