= Bitter Virgin =

Japanese manga series

- Cover of the fourth volume of Bitter Virgin as published by Square Enix

ビター バージン (Bitā Bājin)
- Manga
- Written by: Kei Kusunoki
- Published by: Square Enix
- Magazine: Young Gangan
- Original run: February 18, 2005 – March 7, 2008
- Volumes: 4

Bitter Virgin (Japanese: ビター バージン, Hepburn: Bitā Bājin) is a seinen manga presented by Kei Kusunoki and serialized in Young Gangan. Prior to producing this manga, Kusunoki had stopped writing for a period in order to cope with a miscarriage.

Bitter Virgin is the story of high school student Daisuke Suwa and his classmate, a girl named Hinako Aikawa, as well as the relationship that develops between them soon after Daisuke discovers a tragic – and very personal – secret that Hinako has been forced to bear on her own.

== Plot ==
Daisuke Suwa is a high school student living with his widowed mother in a small Japanese community. His ambitions are to leave the town, gain acceptance at a city university, and enjoy being a bachelor.

In a discussion with a classmate about which of the girls in class he would choose to date, he declares he would pass on only one: Hinako Aikawa, a beautiful but shy girl. Daisuke is put off by her "sweet virgin" act and is annoyed by her extreme reactions to physical contact with men.

Working after school one day, Daisuke takes refuge in an empty church building to avoid a pair of girls, hiding inside a confessional booth. Believing him to be a priest, Hinako asks him to hear her confession.

As a junior high school student, Hinako was sexually abused by her stepfather and became pregnant. Her mother learned of the pregnancy when Hinako miscarried, but did nothing. The abuse continued and Hinako became pregnant again. She was told that the pregnancy may make her incapable of bearing children again, but since the doctors felt an abortion at that point would be dangerous, she carried the baby to term and her mother had it put up for adoption immediately after birth.

Hinako ends by saying that although she never wanted the child and was relieved to have it adopted, she wonders whether it would be all right if she celebrated his birthday, which is today. Daisuke assures her that she has the support of God, which calms Hinako down, she thanks him and leaves.

The next day a baby carriage begins to roll down. Daisuke instinctively jumps to protect Hinako and manages to stop the carriage, both of them are knocked to the ground. In the process, Hinako's skirt gets hitched up, revealing a scar on her stomach which Daisuke recognizes as a Caesarean-section scar. Daisuke realizes that her ordeal was the cause of her aversion to men. He resolves to keep her secret and soon finds himself falling in love with her.

== Characters ==
Daisuke Suwa (諏訪大介, Suwa Daisuke): The main character of the story.

Hinako Aikawa (藍川雛子, Aikawa Hinako): The main female character of the story who has developed extreme trauma towards men caused by her stepfather sexually abusing her when she was younger, making her pregnant twice.

Kazuki Ibuse (井伏香月, Ibuse Kazuki): She is Daisuke and Hinako's classmate.

Yuzu Yamamoto (山本柚, Yamamoto Yuzu): She is Daisuke's classmate and supportive childhood friend who also works at his inn.

Izumi Suwa (諏訪和泉, Suwa Izumi): Daisuke Suwa's sister is 37 weeks pregnant as the result of an affair with a colleague.

Mrs. Suwa: She is a caring mother who struggles to run the family shop.

Yamamoto (山本, Yamamoto): A bespectacled boy and classmate of Hinako, who tried to ask her out.

Nagashima (長嶋, Nagashima): Hinako's stepfather, whom her mother married after her real father died.

== Release ==
The manga series was first serialized in Young Gangan, and comprises four volumes that were released in Japan from April 25, 2006, to June 25, 2008. Abroad, the series was licensed in France by Ki-oon. It was also licensed in Taiwan by Chingwin Publishing, which published the manga's four tankōbon volumes between June and November 2008 and in Hong Kong by Jade Dynasty.

== Reception ==
Manga Sanctuary describes Kei Kusunoki's first love story as masterful stroke, Bitter Virgin being a deeply moving title covering dire subjects. It also praises how the author delivers the heroine's secrets without stylistic excess and the acuteness in the depiction of Daisuke's reaction and behavior. Nicolas Penedo feels that the first volume does not focus on misery and writes with intelligence about the emotional turmoil of Daisuke, describing it as having a shoujo atmosphere, but that it will be enjoyed by both sexes. He felt that the second volume was better written than the first one and that it was by turns touching and passionate. The reviewer for Manga-News feels that while the manga starts out as a typical romance manga but with a protagonist with an annoying attitude, the revelation of Hinako's secret changes the manga completely into a unique story. Nicholas Demay felt that the subject matter was well-treated with modesty and relative realism, but felt that Daisuke's transition from an opportunistic womaniser to a bashful lover was not well-handled. He noted that although the first volume sometimes felt staged, the writing in the second volume was better, noting that Hinako was less insipid than other heroines, reacting in a more realistic way to Daisuke's changed behaviour.
