= Ogre Slayer =

Japanese manga series

- First tankōbon volume cover, featuring the unnamed protagonist

鬼切丸 (Onikirimaru)
- Genre: Gothic fantasy; Mythological; Supernatural thriller
- Manga
- Written by: Kei Kusunoki
- Published by: Shogakukan
- English publisher: NA: Viz Media
- Magazine: Shōnen Sunday Zōkan (1992–1995); Shōnen Sunday Super (1995–2001)
- English magazine: NA: Manga Vizion
- Original run: 1992 – 2001
- Volumes: 20
- Original video animation
- Directed by: Takao Kato
- Written by: Kenji Terada
- Music by: Kazuhiko Toyama; Tomohiko Toyama
- Studio: Pastel
- Licensed by: NA: Viz Media
- Released: September 9, 1994 – July 21, 1995
- Runtime: 30 minutes each
- Episodes: 4
- Manga

The Legend of Onikirimaru
- Written by: Kei Kusunoki
- Published by: Leed Publishing
- English publisher: Crunchyroll Manga
- Magazine: Sengoku Bushō Retsuden (2013–2016); Comic Ran Twins (2016–2018); Pixiv Comics (2018–2025)
- Original run: August 26, 2013 – March 25, 2025
- Volumes: 23
- icon

Ogre Slayer (Japanese: 鬼切丸, Hepburn: Onikirimaru) is a Japanese manga series written and illustrated by Kei Kusunoki. It was published in Shogakukan's shōnen manga magazine Shōnen Sunday Zōkan (later Shōnen Sunday Super) from 1992 to 2001, with its chapters collected in 20 tankōbon volumes. It was adapted into a four-episode original video animation (OVA) released from 1994 to 1995. Both the manga and anime were distributed in North America by Viz Media; only two volumes of the manga were released. Another series, titled The Legend of Onikirimaru, was serialized from August 2013 to March 2025. It takes place in the Sengoku era and features a different lead character

== Synopsis ==
The series follows an unnamed young man (voiced by Takeshi Kusao in Japanese and Jason Gray-Stanford in English) who hunts ogres (oni (鬼)). The young man was born of an ogre's corpse, like the ogre born of human's body, making him pure ogre blood. Though he was born like an ogre, he has the appearance of a human. Instead of being born with horns like traditional Japanese ogres, he was born with a sword called Onikirimaru (鬼切丸), the Ogre Slayer.

== Media ==
=== Manga ===
Written and illustrated by Kei Kusunoki, Ogre Slayer was first published as a one-shot short story, which proved popular among readers, and eventually turned into a serial as Kusonoki drew more sequels, being published in Shogakukan's shōnen manga magazine Shōnen Sunday Zōkan (later Shōnen Sunday Super) from 1992 to 2001. Shogakukan collected its chapters in 20 tankōbon volumes, released from February 18, 1992, to April 18, 2001.

In North America, the manga was licensed by Viz Communications, publishing it on its Manga Vizion magazine, and releasing the first two volumes in 1997 and 1998, respectively.

==== Volumes ====
No.	Japanese release date	Japanese ISBN
1	February 18, 1992	4-09-123011-3
2	March 18, 1993	4-09-123012-1
3	July 17, 1993	4-09-123013-X
4	April 18, 1994	4-09-123014-8
5	December 10, 1994	4-09-123015-6
6	June 17, 1995	4-09-123016-4
7	December 9, 1995	4-09-123017-2
8	February 17, 1996	4-09-123018-0
9	April 18, 1996	4-09-123019-9
10	September 18, 1996	4-09-123020-2
11	December 10, 1996	4-09-125131-5
12	May 17, 1997	4-09-125132-3
13	September 18, 1997	4-09-125133-1
14	April 18, 1998	4-09-125134-X
15	September 18, 1998	4-09-125135-8
16	February 18, 1999	4-09-125136-6
17	July 17, 1999	4-09-125137-4
18	January 18, 2000	4-09-125138-2
19	October 18, 2000	4-09-125139-0
20	April 18, 2001	4-09-125140-4

==== The Legend of Onikirimaru ====
Kusunoki published a one-shot, titled The Legend of Onikirimaru (鬼切丸伝, Onikirimaruden), in Leed Publishing's Sengoku Bushō Retsuden on August 26, 2013, with a serialization planned for future issues; the serialization started on December 26 of that same year. Unlike its predecessor, it takes place in the Sengoku era, and features a different lead character. The magazine published its final issue on June 27, 2016, and the series moved to Comic Ran Twins on September 13 of that same year. It was published in the magazine until June 13, 2018, and moved to the Pixiv Comics website in July of that same year. The series finished on March 25, 2025. Leed Publishing collected its chapters in 23 volumes, released from September 30, 2014, to June 24, 2025.

Crunchyroll Manga started publishing the manga digitally in English in 2014. The service ended in December 2023.

=== Original video animation ===
A four-episode original video animation (OVA), produced by OB Planning, KSS, and Tokyo Broadcasting System, and animated by Pastel, was released from September 9, 1994, to July 21, 1995.

In North America, Viz Video released the four episodes on two VHS (each containing two episodes) in October 1995 and February 1996.
