= Ribon Original =

Japanese manga magazine by Shueisha

- The new cover design of Ribon Original, from the 12/2005 issue
- Categories: Shōjo manga
- Frequency: Quarterly - Bi-monthly
- Founded: 1981
- Final issue: June 2006
- Company: Shueisha
- Country: Japan
- Based in: Tokyo
- Language: Japanese

Ribon Original (Japanese: RIBONオリジナル, Hepburn: Ribon Orijinaru) was a Japanese shōjo manga magazine published by Shueisha. It was a sister magazine of Ribon, and was published from 1981 until 2006. New and up-and-coming Ribon manga artists often had their first short stories published in this magazine. Established Ribon manga artists who had a decrease in popularity also had short stories or short series in Ribon Original, and side stories to series currently running in Ribon were also in this magazine. Yonkoma manga that are published in Ribon also concurrently ran in Ribon Original.

Ribon Original was first published quarterly from 1981. It switched to bimonthly in 1994 and remained as such until the magazine was cancelled due to poor sales. The last issue was the June 2006 issue.

== Serializations ==
- Blood Reign: Curse of the Yoma (1985-1986)
- The Style of the Second Love (1996)
- ChocoMimi (2003-2019)
