= Dog Days (Japanese TV series) =

Japanese anime television series and its franchise

- Cover of the first volume of the first season featuring main characters Shinku Izumi (left) and Millhiore F. Biscotti (right)
- Genre: Adventure; Isekai
- Created by: Masaki Tsuzuki
- Anime television series
- Directed by: Keizō Kusakawa
- Produced by: Hisanori Kunisaki; Hiroyuki Shimizu; Shunsuke Saitō; Tsuyoshi Oda; Akiko Ishioka
- Written by: Masaki Tsuzuki
- Music by: Maiko Iuchi; Susumu Natsume; Yui Isshiki
- Studio: Seven Arcs
- Original network: Tokyo MX, GYT, Gunma TV, Chiba TV, tvk, TV Saitama, MBS, CBC, BS11
- Original run: April 2, 2011 – June 25, 2011
- Episodes: 13
- Light novel
- Written by: Masaki Tsuzuki
- Illustrated by: Kiro Habane
- Published by: Kadokawa Shoten
- Imprint: Kadokawa Sneaker Bunko
- Magazine: Newtype
- Original run: March 2011 – July 2011
- Volumes: 4 chapters
- Manga
- Written by: Masaki Tsuzuki
- Illustrated by: Takuya Fujima
- Published by: Kadokawa Shoten
- Imprint: Kadokawa Comics Ace
- Magazine: Newtype; Comptiq; Comp Ace
- Original run: May 2011 – November 2011
- Volumes: 1
- Anime television series

Dog Days'
- Directed by: Junji Nishimura
- Produced by: Hisanori Kunisaki; Hiroyuki Shimizu; Shunsuke Saitō; Tsuyoshi Oda; Akiko Ishioka
- Written by: Masaki Tsuzuki
- Music by: Maiko Iuchi; Susumu Natsume; Yui Isshiki
- Studio: Seven Arcs
- Original network: Tokyo MX, CBC, Chiba TV, tvk, TV Saitama, GYT, Gunma TV, KBS, Sun TV, BS11
- Original run: July 7, 2012 – September 29, 2012
- Episodes: 13
- Anime television series

Dog Days''
- Directed by: Junji Nishimura
- Produced by: Akiko Ishioka; Tatsuya Ishikawa; Yasuhiro Nakajima
- Written by: Masaki Tsuzuki
- Music by: Yui Isshiki; Susumu Akizuki
- Studio: Seven Arcs Pictures
- Original network: Tokyo MX, GYT, Gunma TV, TV Aichi, Sun TV, KBS, BS11, AT-X
- Original run: January 10, 2015 – March 28, 2015
- Episodes: 12
- icon

Dog Days (stylized in all caps) is a Japanese anime television series created by Masaki Tsuzuki, also known for his work as creator of Magical Girl Lyrical Nanoha and produced by Seven Arcs and Aniplex under the direction of Keizo Kusakawa. The story revolves around a boy named Shinku Izumi, who is summoned to an alternate world, Flonyard, by Princess Millhiore in order to defend Millhiore's country, the Biscotti Republic, from the neighboring kingdom of Galette. The series ran for 13 episodes on Tokyo MX and other channels from April to June 2011. A second series, titled Dog Days', ran for 13 episodes from July to September 2012. A third series, titled Dog Days″, ran for 12 episodes from January to March 2015.

A light novel adaptation with four chapters was published by Kadokawa Shoten, and serialized in Newtype magazine between March and July 2011 issues. Kadokawa Shoten also published a Dog Days manga illustrated by Takuya Fujima, which was serialized in three different magazines from May to November 2011. Several drama CDs have also been produced, as well as a comic anthology.

== Plot ==
Shinku Izumi is a cheerful and athletic half-Japanese, half-Cornish boy who studies at Kinokawa International School in Japan, and has a normal life everyday until he suddenly got summoned to the alternate world of Flonyard (フロニャルド, Furonyarudo). The people there look no different from humans, except for one thing; they have animal ears and tails. The one who summoned him is Millhiore, the dog-like Princess of the Biscotti Republic (ビスコッティ共和国, Bisukotti Kyōwa-koku), who requested his assistance against the forces of the feline-like Galette Lion Dominion (ガレット獅子団領, Garetto Shishi Danrei).

After responding to Millhiore's plea, he receives a sacred weapon, the Palladion (パラディオン, Paradion), and is appointed as a Hero to fight for Biscotti in a war that, unlike the ones on Earth, is waged with special rules and no casualties, in a fashion similar to a sports competition with the purpose to raise funds for the Kingdoms involved, where the winner faction claims a larger sum than the losing side. After winning his first battle for Biscotti, Shinku learns that when a hero is summoned into Flonyard he becomes unable to return to his homeworld, a fact that Millhiore also was unaware of. While the scientists of Biscotti look for a way for him to return home, he decides to keep serving Millhiore as Biscotti's hero for 16 days.

After successfully returning home, Shinku is summoned back time and again (when the conditions were met), to visit Flonyard while embarking freeload adventures with them, accompanied by his cousin and rival athlete Nanami Takatsuki, who is chosen to become Galette's Hero, and his close friend Rebecca Anderson who is also chosen by the squirrel-like Principality of Pastillage (パスティヤージュ公国, Pasutiyāju Kōkoku) to become their hero as well.

== Media ==
=== Anime ===
The anime series, produced by Aniplex and Seven Arcs, is directed by Keizo Kusakawa, series composition by Masaki Tsuzuki, character designs by Osamu Sakata, music by I've Sound, Maiko Iuchi, Susumu Natsume and Yui Isshiki, and produced by the production company Project DD. The series aired 13 episodes from April 2 to June 25, 2011, on Tokyo MX, Tochigi TV, Gunma TV, Chiba TV, TVK, TV Saitama and MBS, with subsequent runs on Chubu-Nippon Broadcasting and BS11. Six DVD and Blu-ray Disc (BD) volumes were released by Aniplex between July 27 and December 21, 2011. The series' opening theme is "Scarlet Knight" by Nana Mizuki and the ending theme song is "Presenter" by Yui Horie, both produced and composed by Elements Garden. The ending song for episode 13 is "Miracle Colors" by Yui Horie. The insert songs of the series are "Kitto Koi wo Shiteiru" (きっと恋をしている, I'm Certainly In Love) in episode 5 and "Promised Love ~Daisuki × 100~" (Promised Love ~ダイスキ x 100~, Promised Love ~I Love You × 100~) in episode 11. Both songs are sung by Yui Horie. A guidebook to the series, called Dog Days: Memory of Flonyard, was released by Kadokawa Shoten on January 26, 2012.

A second anime season, titled Dog Days′ (ドッグデイズダッシュ, Doggu Deizu Dasshu; Dog Days Dash), aired 13 episodes from July 7 to September 29, 2012, on Tokyo MX, with subsequent runs on Chubu-Nippon Broadcasting, Chiba TV, TV Kanagawa, TV Saitama, Tochigi TV, Gunma TV, KBS Kyoto, Sun Television, and BS11. Keizo Kusakawa did not return as director for the season, instead being replaced with Junji Nishimura. Crunchyroll provided a simulcast of the second season beginning on July 14, 2012, with the first season to be uploaded at a later date. Six DVD and BD compilation volumes were released by Aniplex, between September 26, 2012, and March 27, 2013. The opening theme for the second season is "Fearless Hero" by Nana Mizuki and the ending theme song is "Natsu no Yakusoku" (夏の約束, Promise of Summer) by Yui Horie. The insert songs are "Heart Relation" in episode 8 and "Shiny Heart Shiny Smile" in episode 12, both are sung by Horie Yui. The song "Miracle Colors" by Horie Yui, which is the ending song for season 1 episode 13, is also the insert song for episode 11.

In November 2012, a third season was announced. On 24 June 2014, the animator Katsuya Kikuchi, via Twitter, requested his followers to wait a little longer as its third season was still in production. He also stated that more information regarding the anime's third season would be revealed. The series, titled Dog Days″, ran for 12 episodes on Tokyo MX from January 10 to March 28, 2015. The opening theme for the third season is "No Limit" by Nana Mizuki and the ending theme song is "Stay with Me" by Yui Horie.

=== Printed media ===
A light novel adaptation of Dog Days, written by Masaki Tsuzuki, and illustrated by Kiro Habane, was serialized between the March and July 2011 issues of Kadokawa Shoten's Newtype magazine, published under their Kadokawa Sneaker Bunko imprint.

A manga adaptation illustrated by Takuya Fujima was serialized in multiple magazines by Kadokawa Shoten. The first chapter was serialized in the April 2011 issue of Newtype; the second and third chapters were serialized in the May 2011 issue of Comptiq; and the fourth chapter was serialized in Comp Ace. The chapters were later collected into a tankōbon volume by Kadokawa Shoten, published on October 26, 2011, under their Comics Ace imprint.

A 142-page comic anthology was published by Kadokawa Shoten on September 22, 2011, under their Comics Ace imprint. Naruse Hirofumi illustrated the comic's cover. Fourteen different artists contributed to the comic.

=== Drama CDs ===
A series of drama CDs based on the first season of the anime have been released by Aniplex. The first CD volume was released on August 24, 2011, with a total of three CD volumes released as of December 21, 2011. The CDs are side stories that take place between the episodes of the anime, the first taking place after episode 5, the second taking place after episode 12, and the third serving as an epilogue to the first season.

=== Video games ===
Millhiore Firianno Biscotti appears as a playable character in the 2012 PlayStation Portable game Nendoroid Generation. The game is a crossover RPG featuring characters in the distinctive style of Nendoroid figurines. An ensemble cast of game and anime characters join forces to do battle or simply dance.
