= List of Square Enix mobile games =

Video games by developer/publisher

Square Enix's current logo

Square Enix is a Japanese video game development and publishing company formed from the merger on April 1, 2003, of video game developer Square and publisher Enix. The company is best known for its role-playing video game franchises, which include the Final Fantasy series, the Dragon Quest series, and the action-RPG Kingdom Hearts series. Of its properties, the Final Fantasy franchise is the best-selling, with a total worldwide sales of over 173 million units. The Dragon Quest series has sold over 85 million units worldwide and is one of the most popular video game series in Japan, while the Kingdom Hearts series has shipped 36 million copies worldwide. Since its inception, the company has developed or published hundreds of titles in various video game franchises on numerous gaming systems.

Square Enix has owned Taito, which continues to publish its own video games, since September 2005, and acquired game publisher Eidos Interactive in April 2009, which has been merged with Square Enix's European publishing wing and renamed as Square Enix Europe. This list includes games developed or published by Square Enix after its formation and released for mobile platforms such as non-smartphone mobile phones, mobile operating systems such as iOS and Android, or the GREE service, rather than as retail games. This list does not include games published by Taito and Square Enix Europe. As not all games have been made available by Square Enix for sale or download worldwide, this list denotes if a game has been released in Japan, North America, and the PAL region.

== Games ==
List of games
Title	System	Release date	Developer(s)	JP	NA	PAL	Ref(s)
Dragon Quest Monsters i	Mobile phones	January 28, 2002	Armor Project	Yes			
The Portopia Serial Murder Case	Mobile phones	April 3, 2003	Chunsoft	Yes			
Horii Yūji Gekijō	Mobile phones	April 3, 2003	Chunsoft	Yes			
Karuizawa Yūkai Annai	Mobile phones	April 3, 2003	Square Enix	Yes			
Brave Shot	Mobile phones	December 10, 2003	Square Enix		Yes		
Sokoban	Mobile phones	February 2, 2004	Falcon	Yes			
Dragon Quest Mobile	Mobile phones	March 1, 2004	Square Enix	Yes			
Final Fantasy Mobile	Mobile phones	March 1, 2004	Square Enix	Yes			
ActRaiser	Mobile phones	July 1, 2004	Square Enix / Macrospace			Yes	
Aleste	Mobile phones	July 2004	Square Enix / Macrospace			Yes	
Drakengard	Mobile phones	July 2004	Square Enix / Macrospace			Yes	
Before Crisis: Final Fantasy VII	Mobile phones	September 24, 2004	Square Enix	Yes			
Front Mission 2089	Mobile phones	March 7, 2005	MSF / Winds	Yes			
Musashi: Mobile Samurai	Mobile phones	March 15, 2005	Square Enix		Yes		
Final Fantasy VII Snowboarding	Mobile phones	April 2005	Square Enix		Yes		
Egg Monster Hero	Mobile phones	June 6, 2005	Neverland	Yes			
Heavy Metal Thunder	Mobile phones	September 1, 2005	Media.Vision	Yes			
Brave Shot 2	Mobile phones	September 30, 2005	Square Enix		Yes		
Hexcite Fusion	Mobile phones	October 3, 2005	Square Enix		Yes		
Code Age Brawls	Mobile phones	December 19, 2005	Square Enix	Yes			
Dragon Quest Monsters Mobile	Mobile phones	May 22, 2006	Square Enix	Yes			
Dragon Quest Fushigi no Dungeon Mobile	Mobile phones	August 7, 2006	Square Enix	Yes			
Final Fantasy Adventure	Mobile phones	August 16, 2006	Square Enix	Yes			
Dirge of Cerberus Lost Episode: Final Fantasy VII	Mobile phones	August 22, 2006	Ideaworks3D	Yes	Yes		
Monotone	Mobile phones	September 22, 2006	Square Enix	Yes			
Seiken Densetsu: Friends of Mana	Mobile phones	October 18, 2006	Square Enix	Yes			
Megatouch Mobile Arcade	Mobile phones	November 6, 2006	Square Enix		Yes		
Chocobo de Mobile	Mobile phones	December 14, 2006	Square Enix	Yes			
Destiny's Child Groove	Mobile phones	June 11, 2007	Square Enix		Yes		
Makai Toushi SaGa	Mobile phones	July 2, 2007	Square Enix	Yes			
Itadaki Street Mobile	Mobile phones	October 1, 2007	Square Enix	Yes			
Tobal M	Mobile phones	December 12, 2007	Square Enix	Yes			
Crystal Guardians	Mobile phones	January 28, 2008	Square Enix	Yes			
Final Fantasy IV: The After Years	Mobile phones	February 18, 2008	Square Enix	Yes			
Dragon Quest Battle Road Mobile	Mobile phones	March 11, 2008	Square Enix	Yes			
Song Summoner: The Unsung Heroes	iOS	July 7, 2008	Square Enix	Yes	Yes	Yes	
Ellark	Mobile phones	July 8, 2008	Square Enix	Yes			
Hanjuku Hero	Mobile phones	November 10, 2008	Square Enix	Yes			
Kingdom Hearts coded	Mobile phones	November 18, 2008	Square Enix	Yes			
Kingdom Hearts Mobile	Mobile phones	December 15, 2008	Square Enix	Yes			
Crystal Defenders	iOS	December 23, 2008	Square Enix	Yes	Yes	Yes	
Romancing SaGa	Mobile phones	March 5, 2009	Square Enix	Yes			
Hills and Rivers Remain	Mobile phones	May 11, 2009	Square Enix	Yes			
Crystal Defenders: Vanguard Storm	iOS	May 13, 2009	Square Enix	Yes	Yes	Yes	
Star Ocean: Blue Sphere	Mobile phones	June 8, 2009	Square Enix	Yes			
It's New Frontier	Mobile phones	August 24, 2009	Square Enix	Yes			
Dragon Quest Fushigi no Dungeon Mobile 2	Mobile phones	September 14, 2009	Square Enix	Yes			
Sliding Heroes	iOS	September 24, 2009	H.a.n.d.	Yes	Yes	Yes	
Rongo Rongo	Mobile phones	October 28, 2009	Square Enix	Yes			
Final Fantasy IV	Mobile phones	November 5, 2009	Square Enix	Yes			
Dragon Warrior III	Mobile phones	November 19, 2009	Square Enix	Yes			
Song Summoner: The Unsung Heroes Encore	iOS	December 3, 2009	Square Enix	Yes	Yes	Yes	
Sigma Harmonics Coda	Mobile phones	January 28, 2010	Square Enix	Yes			
Final Fantasy	iOS	February 25, 2010	Square Enix	Yes	Yes	Yes	
Final Fantasy II	iOS	February 25, 2010	Square Enix	Yes	Yes	Yes	
Wonder Project J2	iOS	April 12, 2010	Square Enix	Yes			
Chaos Rings	Android	April 20, 2010	Media.Vision	Yes	Yes	Yes	
Chaos Rings	iOS	April 20, 2010	Media.Vision	Yes	Yes	Yes	
Hills and Rivers Remain 2	Mobile phones	May 11, 2010	Square Enix	Yes			
Chocobo Panic	iOS	May 28, 2010	Square Enix	Yes	Yes	Yes	
Final Fantasy in Itadaki Street Mobile	Mobile phones	July 1, 2010	Square Enix	Yes			
Ogre Battle: The March of the Black Queen	Mobile phones	September 1, 2010	Square Enix	Yes			
Final Fantasy Dimensions	Mobile phones	September 6, 2010	Square Enix	Yes			
Romancing SaGa 2	Mobile phones	November 1, 2010	Square Enix	Yes			
Voice Fantasy	iOS	November 1, 2010	Square Enix	Yes	Yes	Yes	
Secret of Mana	iOS	December 21, 2010	Square Enix	Yes	Yes	Yes	
Crystal Defenders	Android	January 25, 2011	Square Enix	Yes	Yes	Yes	
Final Fantasy III	Android	March 24, 2011	Matrix	Yes	Yes	Yes	
Final Fantasy III	iOS	March 24, 2011	Matrix	Yes	Yes	Yes	
Chrono Trigger	Mobile phones	April 25, 2011	Square Enix	Yes			
Summer Story	iOS	April 27, 2011	Square Enix	Yes			
Imaginary Range	Android	May 5, 2011	H.a.n.d.	Yes	Yes	Yes	
Imaginary Range	iOS	May 5, 2011	H.a.n.d.	Yes	Yes	Yes	
Chaos Rings Omega	Android	May 19, 2011	Media.Vision	Yes	Yes	Yes	
Chaos Rings Omega	iOS	May 19, 2011	Media.Vision	Yes	Yes	Yes	
Secret of Mana	Mobile phones	May 18, 2011	Square Enix	Yes			
Final Fantasy Tactics: The War of the Lions	iOS	August 4, 2011	Square Enix	Yes	Yes	Yes	
Dragon Quest Monsters: Wanted!	Mobile phones	December 1, 2011	Armor Project	Yes			
Final Fantasy	Android	December 1, 2011	Square Enix	Yes	Yes	Yes	
Chrono Trigger	iOS	December 9, 2011	Square Enix	Yes	Yes	Yes	
Chrono Trigger	Android	December 22, 2011	Square Enix	Yes	Yes	Yes	
Final Fantasy Airborne Brigade	Mobile phones	January 6, 2012	DeNA	Yes			
Fortune Street Smart	Android	January 23, 2012	Square Enix	Yes			
Final Fantasy II	Android	February 1, 2012	Square Enix	Yes	Yes	Yes	
Imaginary Range II	iOS	February 29, 2012	H.a.n.d.	Yes	Yes	Yes	
Chaos Rings II	Android	March 15, 2012	Media.Vision	Yes	Yes	Yes	
Chaos Rings II	iOS	March 15, 2012	Media.Vision	Yes	Yes	Yes	
Fortune Street Smart	iOS	March 22, 2012	Square Enix	Yes	Yes	Yes	
774 Deaths	Android	April 2, 2012	Square Enix	Yes	Yes	Yes	
774 Deaths	iOS	April 2, 2012	Square Enix	Yes	Yes	Yes	
Diffusion Million Arthur	Android	April 9, 2012	MightyCraft	Yes			
Diffusion Million Arthur	iOS	April 9, 2012	MightyCraft	Yes			
Victorian Mysteries: Woman in White	iOS	May 2, 2012	Freeze Tag		Yes	Yes	
Final Fantasy	Windows Phone	June 13, 2012	Square	Yes	Yes	Yes	
Guardian Cross	Android	June 21, 2012	Square Enix	Yes	Yes	Yes	
Guardian Cross	iOS	June 21, 2012	Square Enix	Yes	Yes	Yes	
Drakerider	Android	July 23, 2012	Witchcraft	Yes	Yes	Yes	
Drakerider	iOS	July 23, 2012	Witchcraft	Yes	Yes	Yes	
SolaRola	Android	July 27, 2012	Progressive Media ApS.		Yes	Yes	
SolaRola	iOS	July 27, 2012	Progressive Media ApS.		Yes	Yes	
Otome-Break!	Android	August 8, 2012	Square Enix	Yes			
Otome-Break!	iOS	August 8, 2012	Square Enix	Yes			
KooZac	Android	August 21, 2012	Viker		Yes	Yes	
KooZac	iOS	August 22, 2012	Viker		Yes	Yes	
The World Ends with You: Solo Remix	iOS	August 27, 2012	Square Enix / h.a.n.d.	Yes	Yes	Yes	
Final Fantasy Dimensions	Android	August 31, 2012	Square Enix	Yes	Yes	Yes	
Final Fantasy Dimensions	iOS	August 31, 2012	Square Enix	Yes	Yes	Yes	
Nirvaana of Genesis	GREE	September 5, 2012	Square Enix / GREE	Yes			
Emperors SaGa	GREE	September 18, 2012	Square Enix / GREE	Yes			
Demons' Score	Android	September 19, 2012	Square Enix / Epic Games / iNiS	Yes	Yes	Yes	
Demons' Score	iOS	September 19, 2012	Square Enix / Epic Games / iNiS	Yes	Yes	Yes	
Symphonica	iOS	October 18, 2012	Square Enix	Yes	Yes	Yes	
Wizardlings	iOS	October 25, 2012	Liv Games / Emerald City		Yes		
Countastic	Android	November 2, 2012	Square Enix		Yes		
Motley Blocks	Android	November 7, 2012	Sarbakan		Yes		
Motley Blocks	iOS	November 21, 2012	Sarbakan		Yes		
Chocobo's Chocotto Farm	GREE	November 19, 2012	Smile Lab	Yes			
Galaxy Dungeon	GREE	November 20, 2012	Square Enix / GREE	Yes			
Final Fantasy Artniks	GREE	November 30, 2012	Square Enix / GREE	Yes			
Theatrhythm Final Fantasy	iOS	December 13, 2012	Square Enix	Yes	Yes	Yes	
Final Fantasy Airborne Brigade	Android	December 14, 2012	Square Enix		Yes		
Final Fantasy Airborne Brigade	iOS	December 14, 2012	Square Enix		Yes		
Final Fantasy IV	iOS	December 20, 2012	Square Enix	Yes	Yes	Yes	
Final Fantasy: All the Bravest	iOS	January 16, 2013	Square Enix	Yes	Yes	Yes	
Final Fantasy Tactics: The War of the Lions	Android	February 14, 2013	Square Enix	Yes			
Circle of Mana	GREE	March 5, 2013	Square Enix / GREE	Yes			
Chaos Rings	Windows Phone	March 27, 2013	Media.Vision	Yes	Yes	Yes	
Final Fantasy V	iOS	March 28, 2013	Square Enix	Yes	Yes	Yes	
The World Ends with You: Live Remix	GREE	May 21, 2013	Square Enix / GREE	Yes			
Final Fantasy Tactics S	Android	May 28, 2013	Square Enix / Mobage	Yes			
Final Fantasy Tactics S	iOS	May 28, 2013	Square Enix / Mobage	Yes			
Final Fantasy IV	Android	June 3, 2013	Square Enix	Yes	Yes	Yes	
Sangokushi Rumble	iOS	June 20, 2013	Square Enix	Yes			
Bloodmasque	iOS	July 25, 2013	Square Enix	Yes	Yes	Yes	
Final Fantasy V	Android	September 25, 2013	Square Enix	Yes	Yes	Yes	
Melpharia March	iOS	September 26, 2013	Square Enix	Yes			
Pictlogica Final Fantasy	Android	October 21, 2013	Square Enix	Yes			
Pictlogica Final Fantasy	iOS	October 21, 2013	Square Enix	Yes			
Final Fantasy IV: The After Years	Android	November 25, 2013	Square Enix	Yes	Yes	Yes	
Final Fantasy IV: The After Years	iOS	November 25, 2013	Square Enix	Yes	Yes	Yes	
Dragon Warrior	Android	November 28, 2013	Chunsoft / Square Enix	Yes			
Dragon Warrior	iOS	November 28, 2013	Chunsoft / Square Enix	Yes			
Occult Maiden	iOS	November 29, 2013	Square Enix	Yes			
Occult Maiden	Android	December 31, 2013	Square Enix	Yes			
Final Fantasy VI	Android	January 15, 2014	Square Enix	Yes	Yes	Yes	
Dragon Quest Monsters: Super Light	Android	January 23, 2014	Square Enix	Yes			
Dragon Quest Monsters: Super Light	iOS	January 23, 2014	Square Enix	Yes			
Guns N' Souls	Android	January 30, 2014	Square Enix	Yes			
Guns N' Souls	iOS	January 30, 2014	Square Enix	Yes			
Final Fantasy VI	iOS	February 6, 2014	Square Enix	Yes	Yes	Yes	
Deadman's Cross	Android	February 13, 2014	Square Enix	Yes	Yes	Yes	
Deadman's Cross	iOS	February 13, 2014	Square Enix	Yes	Yes	Yes	
Dragon Sky	Android	February 19, 2014	Square Enix	Yes			
Dragon Sky	iOS	February 19, 2014	Square Enix	Yes			
Rise of Mana	Android	March 6, 2014	Square Enix	Yes			
Schoolgirl Strikers	Android	April 14, 2014	Square Enix	Yes			
Schoolgirl Strikers	iOS	April 14, 2014	Square Enix	Yes			
Dragon Quest IV	Android	April 17, 2014	Chunsoft	Yes	Yes	Yes	
Dragon Quest IV	iOS	April 17, 2014	Chunsoft	Yes	Yes	Yes	
Final Fantasy Agito	Android	May 14, 2014	Square Enix / Tayutau K.K.	Yes			
Final Fantasy Agito	iOS	May 14, 2014	Square Enix / Tayutau K.K.	Yes			
Dragon Quest VIII: Journey of the Cursed King	iOS	May 28, 2014	Level-5	Yes	Yes	Yes	
Rise of Mana	Android	June 26, 2014	Square Enix	Yes			
Dragon Warrior II	Android	June 26, 2014	Chunsoft / Square Enix	Yes			
Dragon Warrior II	iOS	June 26, 2014	Chunsoft / Square Enix	Yes			
The World Ends with You: Solo Remix	Android	June 26, 2014	Square Enix	Yes	Yes	Yes	
Final Fantasy: World Wide Words	Android	September 16, 2014	Square Enix	Yes			
Final Fantasy: World Wide Words	iOS	September 16, 2014	Square Enix	Yes			
Final Fantasy Record Keeper	Android	September 24, 2014	DeNA / Mobage / Square Enix	Yes	Yes	Yes	
Final Fantasy Record Keeper	iOS	September 24, 2014	DeNA / Mobage / Square Enix	Yes	Yes	Yes	
Dragon Quest III	Android	September 25, 2014	Square Enix	Yes	Yes	Yes	
Dragon Quest III	iOS	September 25, 2014	Square Enix	Yes	Yes	Yes	
Chaos Rings III	Android	October 16, 2014	Media.Vision	Yes	Yes	Yes	
Chaos Rings III	iOS	October 16, 2014	Media.Vision	Yes	Yes	Yes	
Final Fantasy VII G-Bike	Android	October 29, 2014	Square Enix / CyberConnect2	Yes			
Final Fantasy VII G-Bike	iOS	October 29, 2014	Square Enix / CyberConnect2	Yes			
Final Fantasy Artniks Dive	GREE	November 10, 2014	Square Enix / GREE	Yes			
Yantama RE:Union	Android	November 24, 2014	Sisilala Overdrive	Yes			
Yantama RE:Union	iOS	November 24, 2014	Sisilala Overdrive	Yes			
Heavenstrike Rivals	Android	December 16, 2014	Mediatonic	Yes	Yes	Yes	
Heavenstrike Rivals	iOS	December 16, 2014	Mediatonic	Yes	Yes	Yes	
Dragon Quest V: Hand of the Heavenly Bride	Android	January 22, 2015	ArtePiazza	Yes	Yes	Yes	
Dragon Quest V: Hand of the Heavenly Bride	iOS	January 22, 2015	ArtePiazza	Yes	Yes	Yes	
Bravely Archive: D's Report	Android	January 26, 2015	Square Enix	Yes			
Bravely Archive: D's Report	iOS	January 26, 2015	Square Enix	Yes			
Final Fantasy Legends: Toki no Suishō	Android	February 12, 2015	Matrix Software / Square Enix	Yes			
Final Fantasy Legends: Toki no Suishō	iOS	February 12, 2015	Matrix Software / Square Enix	Yes			
The Blue Maiden of Arcadia	Android	March 13, 2015	Square Enix	Yes			
The Blue Maiden of Arcadia	iOS	March 13, 2015	Square Enix	Yes			
Final Fantasy XIII	Android	April 9, 2015	Square Enix	Yes			
Final Fantasy XIII	iOS	April 9, 2015	Square Enix	Yes			
Masters of the Masks	Android	April 16, 2015	Square Enix / Lostmoon Games	Yes	Yes	Yes	
Masters of the Masks	iOS	April 16, 2015	Square Enix / Lostmoon Games	Yes	Yes	Yes	
Mobius Final Fantasy	Android	June 4, 2015	Square Enix	Yes	Yes	Yes	
Mobius Final Fantasy	iOS	June 4, 2015	Square Enix	Yes	Yes	Yes	
Rampage Land Rankers	Android	June 16, 2015	Square Enix / HexaDrive	Yes			
Rampage Land Rankers	iOS	June 16, 2015	Square Enix / HexaDrive	Yes			
Final Fantasy VII	iOS	August 19, 2015	Square Enix	Yes	Yes	Yes	
Final Fantasy VII	Android	July 7, 2016	Square Enix	Yes	Yes	Yes	
Kingdom Hearts Union χ	Android	September 3, 2015	Square Enix	Yes	Yes	Yes	
Kingdom Hearts Union χ	iOS	September 3, 2015	Square Enix	Yes	Yes	Yes	
Final Fantasy XIII-2	Android	September 25, 2015	Square Enix	Yes			
Final Fantasy XIII-2	iOS	September 25, 2015	Square Enix	Yes			
Final Fantasy Grandmasters	Android	October 1, 2015	Crooz	Yes			
Final Fantasy Grandmasters	iOS	October 1, 2015	Crooz	Yes			
Final Fantasy: Brave Exvius	Android	October 22, 2015	gumi Inc.	Yes	Yes	Yes	
Final Fantasy: Brave Exvius	iOS	October 22, 2015	gumi Inc.	Yes	Yes	Yes	
Grimms Notes	Android	January 20, 2016	Genki	Yes	Yes	Yes	
Grimms Notes	iOS	January 20, 2016	Genki	Yes	Yes	Yes	
Alice Order	Android	January 28, 2016	Square Enix	Yes			
Alice Order	iOS	January 28, 2016	Square Enix	Yes			
Adventures of Mana	Android	February 4, 2016	Square Enix	Yes	Yes	Yes	
Adventures of Mana	iOS	February 4, 2016	Square Enix	Yes	Yes	Yes	
Final Fantasy IX	Android	February 10, 2016	Square Enix / Silicon Studio Thailand	Yes	Yes	Yes	
Final Fantasy IX	iOS	February 10, 2016	Square Enix / Silicon Studio Thailand	Yes	Yes	Yes	
Lightning Returns: Final Fantasy XIII	Android	February 17, 2016	Square Enix	Yes			
Lightning Returns: Final Fantasy XIII	iOS	February 17, 2016	Square Enix	Yes			
Valkyrie Anatomia: The Origin	Android	April 28, 2016	tri-Ace	Yes			
Valkyrie Anatomia: The Origin	iOS	April 28, 2016	tri-Ace	Yes			
Pukukkusu	Android	May 31, 2016	Square Enix	Yes			
Pukukkusu	iOS	May 31, 2016	Square Enix	Yes			
Samurai Rising	Android	June 2, 2016	Square Enix	Yes			
Samurai Rising	iOS	June 2, 2016	Square Enix	Yes			
Justice Monsters Five	Android	August 31, 2016	Square Enix	Yes	Yes	Yes	
Justice Monsters Five	iOS	August 31, 2016	Square Enix	Yes	Yes	Yes	
Guardian Codex	Android	November 3, 2016	Square Enix	Yes	Yes	Yes	
Guardian Codex	iOS	November 3, 2016	Square Enix	Yes	Yes	Yes	
Star Ocean: Anamnesis	Android	December 7, 2016	tri-Ace	Yes			
Star Ocean: Anamnesis	iOS	December 7, 2016	tri-Ace	Yes			
Final Fantasy Awakening	Android	December 14, 2016	Perfect World / Efun Company Limited / FL Studio Mobile / Oasis Games			Yes	
Final Fantasy Awakening	iOS	December 14, 2016	Perfect World / Efun Company Limited / FL Studio Mobile / Oasis Games			Yes	
Dissidia Final Fantasy: Opera Omnia	Android	February 1, 2017	Square Enix	Yes	Yes	Yes	
Dissidia Final Fantasy: Opera Omnia	iOS	February 1, 2017	Square Enix	Yes	Yes	Yes	
Bravely Default: Fairy's Effect	Android	March 21, 2017	Square Enix	Yes			
Bravely Default: Fairy's Effect	iOS	March 23, 2017	Square Enix	Yes			
Flame x Blaze	Android	April 11, 2017	Square Enix	Yes	Yes	Yes	
Flame x Blaze	iOS	April 11, 2017	Square Enix	Yes	Yes	Yes	
SINoALICE	Android	June 6, 2017	Pokelabo	Yes			
SINoALICE	iOS	June 6, 2017	Pokelabo	Yes			
Project Tokyo Dolls	Android	June 22, 2017	Square Enix	Yes			
Project Tokyo Dolls	iOS	June 22, 2017	Square Enix	Yes			
Final Fantasy XV: A New Empire	Android	June 29, 2017	Machine Zone	Yes	Yes	Yes	
Final Fantasy XV: A New Empire	iOS	June 29, 2017	Machine Zone	Yes	Yes	Yes	
KimiKiri: Kimi to Kiri no Labyrinth	Android	July 13, 2017	Square Enix	Yes			
KimiKiri: Kimi to Kiri no Labyrinth	iOS	July 13, 2017	Square Enix	Yes			
Dia Horizon	Android	August 25, 2017	Flame Hearts	Yes			
Dia Horizon	iOS	August 25, 2017	Flame Hearts	Yes			
King's Knight: Wrath of the Dark Dragon	Android	September 13, 2017	Flame Hearts	Yes	Yes	Yes	
King's Knight: Wrath of the Dark Dragon	iOS	September 13, 2017	Flame Hearts	Yes	Yes	Yes	
Hanjuku Hero: Aa, Sekaiyo Hanjukunare...!	Android	October 19, 2017	Square Enix	Yes			
Hanjuku Hero: Aa, Sekaiyo Hanjukunare...!	iOS	October 19, 2017	Square Enix	Yes			
Final Fantasy Dimensions II	Android	October 31, 2017	Square Enix	Yes	Yes	Yes	
Final Fantasy Dimensions II	iOS	October 31, 2017	Square Enix	Yes	Yes	Yes	
Dragon Quest Rivals	Android	November 3, 2017	Tose	Yes			
Dragon Quest Rivals	iOS	November 3, 2017	Tose	Yes			
School Girl Strikers: Twinkle Melodies	Android	November 13, 2017	Square Enix	Yes			
School Girl Strikers: Twinkle Melodies	iOS	November 13, 2017	Square Enix	Yes			
Battle of Blades	Android	November 27, 2017	Square Enix	Yes			
Battle of Blades	iOS	November 27, 2017	Square Enix	Yes			
World of Final Fantasy: Meli-Melo	Android	December 12, 2017	Square Enix	Yes			
World of Final Fantasy: Meli-Melo	iOS	December 12, 2017	Square Enix	Yes			
Servant of Thrones	Android	January 22, 2018	Square Enix	Yes			
Servant of Thrones	iOS	January 22, 2018	Square Enix	Yes			
Final Fantasy XV: Pocket Edition	Android	February 9, 2018	Square Enix	Yes	Yes	Yes	
Final Fantasy XV: Pocket Edition	iOS	February 9, 2018	Square Enix	Yes	Yes	Yes	
Final Fantasy Explorers-Force	Android	March 15, 2018	Square Enix	Yes			
Final Fantasy Explorers-Force	iOS	March 15, 2018	Square Enix	Yes			
Toji no Miko: Kizamishi Issen no Tomoshibi	Android	March 18, 2018	Game Studio	Yes			
Toji no Miko: Kizamishi Issen no Tomoshibi	iOS	March 18, 2018	Game Studio	Yes			
SaGa: Scarlet Grace — Ambitions	Android	August 2, 2018	Square Enix	Yes	Yes	Yes	
SaGa: Scarlet Grace — Ambitions	iOS	August 2, 2018	Square Enix	Yes	Yes	Yes	
Idol Fantasy	Android	September 17, 2018	Preimium Agency	Yes			
Idol Fantasy	iOS	September 17, 2018	Preimium Agency	Yes			
Fantasy Earth Genesis	Android	September 27, 2018	Asobimo	Yes			
Fantasy Earth Genesis	iOS	September 27, 2018	Asobimo	Yes			
Gestalt Odin	Android	October 18, 2018	Aiming	Yes			
Gestalt Odin	iOS	October 18, 2018	Aiming	Yes			
Mashiro Witch: Marchen of Midnight	Android	November 1, 2018	Square Enix	Yes			
Mashiro Witch: Marchen of Midnight	iOS	November 1, 2018	Square Enix	Yes			
Romancing SaGa Re;Universe	Android	December 6, 2018	Akatsuki	Yes			
Romancing SaGa Re;Universe	iOS	December 6, 2018	Akatsuki	Yes			
Grimms Echoes	Android	March 28, 2019	Genki	Yes			
Grimms Echoes	iOS	March 28, 2019	Genki	Yes			
Last Idea	Android	April 18, 2019	O-two	Yes			
Last Idea	iOS	April 18, 2019	O-two	Yes			
Final Fantasy Digital Card Game	Android	July 9, 2019	Square Enix	Yes			
Final Fantasy Digital Card Game	iOS	July 9, 2019	Square Enix	Yes			
Dragon Quest Walk	Android	September 12, 2019	Colopl	Yes			
Dragon Quest Walk	iOS	September 12, 2019	Colopl	Yes			
Various Daylife	iOS	September 19, 2019	DokiDoki Groove Works	Yes	Yes	Yes	
Romancing SaGa 3	Android	November 11, 2019	ArtePiazza	Yes	Yes	Yes	
Romancing SaGa 3	iOS	November 11, 2019	ArtePiazza	Yes	Yes	Yes	
War of the Visions: Final Fantasy Brave Exvius	Android	November 14, 2019	Square Enix / Gumi Inc.	Yes	Yes	Yes	
War of the Visions: Final Fantasy Brave Exvius	iOS	November 14, 2019	Square Enix / Gumi Inc.	Yes	Yes	Yes	
The Last Remnant	Android	December 12, 2019	Square Enix	Yes	Yes	Yes	
The Last Remnant	iOS	December 12, 2019	Square Enix	Yes	Yes	Yes	
Kingdom Hearts Dark Road	Android	June 22, 2020	Toylogic	Yes	Yes	Yes	
Kingdom Hearts Dark Road	iOS	June 22, 2020	Toylogic	Yes	Yes	Yes	
Dragon Quest Tact	Android	July 16, 2020	Aiming	Yes			
Dragon Quest Tact	iOS	July 16, 2020	Aiming	Yes			
Final Fantasy Crystal Chronicles: Remastered Edition	Android	August 27, 2020	Square Enix	Yes	Yes	Yes	
Final Fantasy Crystal Chronicles: Remastered Edition	iOS	August 27, 2020	Square Enix	Yes	Yes	Yes	
Octopath Traveler: Champions of the Continent	Android	October 28, 2020	Square Enix / Acquire	Yes	Yes	Yes	
Octopath Traveler: Champions of the Continent	iOS	October 28, 2020	Square Enix / Acquire	Yes	Yes	Yes	
Nier Reincarnation	Android	February 18, 2021	Applibot	Yes	Yes	Yes	
Nier Reincarnation	iOS	February 18, 2021	Applibot	Yes	Yes	Yes	
Final Fantasy VIII Remastered	Android	March 24, 2021	Square Enix	Yes	Yes	Yes	
Final Fantasy VIII Remastered	iOS	March 24, 2021	Square Enix	Yes	Yes	Yes	
SaGa Frontier	Android	April 15, 2021	Square	Yes	Yes	Yes	
SaGa Frontier	iOS	April 15, 2021	Square	Yes	Yes	Yes	
Final Fantasy Pixel Remaster	Android	July 28, 2021	Tose	Yes	Yes	Yes	
Final Fantasy Pixel Remaster	iOS	July 28, 2021	Tose	Yes	Yes	Yes	
Final Fantasy II Pixel Remaster	Android	July 28, 2021	Tose	Yes	Yes	Yes	
Final Fantasy II Pixel Remaster	iOS	July 28, 2021	Tose	Yes	Yes	Yes	
Final Fantasy III Pixel Remaster	Android	July 28, 2021	Tose	Yes	Yes	Yes	
Final Fantasy III Pixel Remaster	iOS	July 28, 2021	Tose	Yes	Yes	Yes	
Final Fantasy IV Pixel Remaster	Android	September 8, 2021	Tose	Yes	Yes	Yes	
Final Fantasy IV Pixel Remaster	iOS	September 8, 2021	Tose	Yes	Yes	Yes	
Collection of SaGa: Final Fantasy Legend	Android	September 22, 2021	Square Enix	Yes	Yes	Yes	
Collection of SaGa: Final Fantasy Legend	iOS	September 22, 2021	Square Enix	Yes	Yes	Yes	
Actraiser Renaissance	Android	September 23, 2021	Square Enix / Sonic Powered	Yes	Yes	Yes	
Actraiser Renaissance	iOS	September 23, 2021	Square Enix / Sonic Powered	Yes	Yes	Yes	
Dragon Quest The Adventure of Dai: A Hero's Bonds	Android	September 28, 2021	DeNA	Yes	Yes	Yes	
Dragon Quest The Adventure of Dai: A Hero's Bonds	iOS	September 28, 2021	DeNA	Yes	Yes	Yes	
Final Fantasy V Pixel Remaster	Android	November 10, 2021	Tose	Yes	Yes	Yes	
Final Fantasy V Pixel Remaster	iOS	November 10, 2021	Tose	Yes	Yes	Yes	
Final Fantasy VII: The First Soldier	Android	November 17, 2021	Ateam	Yes	Yes	Yes	
Final Fantasy VII: The First Soldier	iOS	November 17, 2021	Ateam	Yes	Yes	Yes	
Dragon Quest Keshi Keshi!	Android	December 1, 2021	NHN PlayArt	Yes			
Dragon Quest Keshi Keshi!	iOS	December 1, 2021	NHN PlayArt	Yes			
Chocobo GP'	Android	January 13, 2022	Square Enix	Yes	Yes	Yes	
Chocobo GP'	iOS	January 13, 2022	Square Enix	Yes	Yes	Yes	
Bravely Default: Brilliant Lights	Android	January 27, 2022	Square Enix	Yes			
Bravely Default: Brilliant Lights	iOS	January 27, 2022	Square Enix	Yes			
Final Fantasy VI Pixel Remaster	Android	February 23, 2022	Tose	Yes	Yes	Yes	
Final Fantasy VI Pixel Remaster	iOS	February 23, 2022	Tose	Yes	Yes	Yes	
Echoes of Mana	Android	April 27, 2022	Wright Flyer Studios	Yes			
Echoes of Mana	iOS	April 27, 2022	Wright Flyer Studios	Yes			
Fullmetal Alchemist Mobile	Android	August 4, 2022	Square Enix	Yes			
Fullmetal Alchemist Mobile	iOS	August 4, 2022	Square Enix	Yes			
Romancing SaGa: Minstrel Song	Android	December 1, 2022	Square Enix	Yes	Yes	Yes	
Romancing SaGa: Minstrel Song	iOS	December 1, 2022	Square Enix	Yes	Yes	Yes	
Towatsugai	Android	February 16, 2023	Square Enix	Yes			
Towatsugai	iOS	February 16, 2023	Square Enix	Yes			
Engage Kill	Android	March 1, 2023	Square Enix	Yes			
Engage Kill	iOS	March 1, 2023	Square Enix	Yes			
Paranormasight: The Seven Mysteries of Honjo	Android	March 4, 2023	xeen	Yes	Yes	Yes	
Paranormasight: The Seven Mysteries of Honjo	iOS	March 4, 2023	xeen	Yes	Yes	Yes	
Voice of Cards: The Isle Dragon Roars	Android	March 23, 2023	Alim	Yes	Yes	Yes	
Voice of Cards: The Isle Dragon Roars	iOS	March 23, 2023	Alim	Yes	Yes	Yes	
Voice of Cards: The Forsaken Maiden	Android	March 23, 2023	Alim	Yes	Yes	Yes	
Voice of Cards: The Forsaken Maiden	iOS	March 23, 2023	Alim	Yes	Yes	Yes	
Voice of Cards: The Beasts of Burden	Android	March 23, 2023	Alim	Yes	Yes	Yes	
Voice of Cards: The Beasts of Burden	iOS	March 23, 2023	Alim	Yes	Yes	Yes	
The Centennial Case: A Shijima Story	Android	April 25, 2023	h.a.n.d.	Yes	Yes	Yes	
The Centennial Case: A Shijima Story	iOS	April 25, 2023	h.a.n.d.	Yes	Yes	Yes	
Dragon Quest Champions	Android	June 13, 2023	Omega Force	Yes			
Dragon Quest Champions	iOS	June 13, 2023	Omega Force	Yes			
Ketsugou Danshi: Elements with Emotions	Android	August 10, 2023	Square Enix	Yes			
Ketsugou Danshi: Elements with Emotions	iOS	August 10, 2023	Square Enix	Yes			
Final Fantasy VII: Ever Crisis	Android	September 7, 2023	Applibot	Yes	Yes	Yes	
Final Fantasy VII: Ever Crisis	iOS	September 7, 2023	Applibot	Yes	Yes	Yes	
SaGa: Emerald Beyond	Android	April 25, 2024	Square Enix	Yes	Yes	Yes	
SaGa: Emerald Beyond	iOS	April 25, 2024	Square Enix	Yes	Yes	Yes	
Dragon Quest Monsters: The Dark Prince	Android	September 11, 2024	Tose	Yes	Yes	Yes	
Dragon Quest Monsters: The Dark Prince	iOS	September 11, 2024	Tose	Yes	Yes	Yes	
Emberstoria	Android	November 27, 2024	Square Enix / DMM Games	Yes			
Emberstoria	iOS	November 27, 2024	Square Enix / DMM Games	Yes			
SaGa Frontier 2	Android	March 27, 2025	Square	Yes	Yes	Yes	
SaGa Frontier 2	iOS	March 27, 2025	Square	Yes	Yes	Yes	
Paranormasight: The Mermaid's Curse	Android	February 19, 2026	Xeen	Yes	Yes	Yes	
Paranormasight: The Mermaid's Curse	iOS	February 19, 2026	Xeen	Yes	Yes	Yes	
Dissidia Duellum Final Fantasy	Android	March 23, 2026	Square Enix / NHN PlayArt	Yes	Yes	Yes	
Dissidia Duellum Final Fantasy	iOS	March 23, 2026	Square Enix / NHN PlayArt	Yes	Yes	Yes	
Dragon Quest Smash/Grow	Android	April 21, 2026	Square Enix	Yes	Yes	Yes	
Dragon Quest Smash/Grow	iOS	April 21, 2026	Square Enix	Yes	Yes	Yes	
Dragon Quest RPG: The Cursed Tree and the Chosen Isle	Android	2027	Wright Flyer Studios	Coming	Coming	Coming	
Dragon Quest RPG: The Cursed Tree and the Chosen Isle	iOS	2027	Wright Flyer Studios	Coming	Coming	Coming	
