= Code Age (disambiguation) =

Code Age may refer to:

- Code Age, a multimedia series created by Square Enix.
  - Code Age Commanders, a PlayStation 2 video game
  - Code Age Brawls, a mobile video game
  - Code Age Archives, a manga published by Gangan Comics
