= Chaos Rings III =

2014 role-playing video game

- PlayStation Vita boxart
- Developer: Media.Vision
- Publisher: Square Enix
- Director: Koichi Shirasaka
- Producers: Takehiro Ando; Wataru Kato; Tetsuya Okubo
- Programmers: Hiroyuki Sugiyama; Keisuke Hata; Kensuke Imura
- Artists: Takayuki Yabubayashi; Akiko Shioya
- Writer: Shinya Tokunaga
- Composer: Noriyasu Agematsu
- Series: Chaos Rings
- Platforms: PlayStation Vita, iOS, Android
- Release: JP: October 16, 2014; NA: May 28, 2015 (iOS, Android)
- Genre: Role-playing
- Mode: Single-player

Chaos Rings III (ケイオスリングス, Keiosu Ringusu III) is a 2014 Japanese role-playing video game developed by Media.Vision and published by Square Enix. It is the fourth game in the Chaos Rings series, after Chaos Rings, Chaos Rings Omega, and Chaos Rings II. Like its predecessors, it was released on iOS, and Android devices, but also the first to be released for the PlayStation Vita platform. The PS Vita release, titled Chaos Rings III: Prequel Trilogy (ケイオスリングスIII プリクエル・トリロジー) contains all four titles in the Chaos Rings series.

== Gameplay ==
The game is a turn-based Japanese role-playing video game, keeping consistent with previous titles in the series.

== Story ==
The game takes place in a world where adventurers arrive at the coastal city of "Neo Paleo" to become "Explorers" in order to travel to the heavens: the planet called "Marble Blue". The game follows characters and their reasons for taking the pilgrimage to "Marble Blue". One of the main characters, Nazca, dreams of finding "Paradise", Marble Blue's biggest mystery. Another character, Leary, travels there to find her father, who she believes has been kidnapped and taken there by an unknown person. As the game progresses, the hero finds out the truth behind Paradise and the origins of Marble Blue.

=== Characters ===
Chaos Rings III has five playable characters. Unlike previous games in the series, parties are now composed of up to three characters, and the two inactive characters are also able to receive experience, albeit less than those in the active party. Like previous games in the series, the game features voice acting in key scenes, though only in Japanese.

==== Playable Characters ====
Nazca (ナスカ, Nasuka)
Voiced by: Yoshitsugu Matsuoka
The main protagonist of the game. He is named by the player at the beginning of the story, though his name is listed as Nazca in the official website. His father was an explorer who went missing while searching for Paradise, the greatest secret of the planet of Marble Blue, and his mother died of grief upon hearing the news. Thus, he grew up with his younger sister under the care of their neighbour, Dorothy. Now 16 years old, he wishes to become an Explorer himself and fulfill his father's dream.

Leary (リアリー, Riarī)
Voiced by: Kanae Ito
Accompanies Nazca on his license trial to get his Explorer's license, and becomes one of his teammates after they pass the test together. She wishes to become an Explorer to search for her father, who was abducted by the crook Shyamalan.

Daisuke (だいすけ, Daisuke)
Voiced by: Atsushi Abe
Accompanies Nazca on his license trial to get his Explorer's license, and becomes one of his teammates after they pass the test together. He wishes to find a gift that can cure the disease that is slowly killing his mother.

Al (アル, Aru)
Voiced by: Keiji Fujiwara
His full name is Alfred (アルフレッド). An examiner for the license trial that potential Explorers have to sit for to get their license, he is also a Rank III Explorer himself. He later joins Nazca's team.

Elroux (エルル, Eruru)
Voiced by: Yui Ogura
The daughter of Mariv who later joins Nazca on his journey.

== Development ==
The game was first announced on August 4, 2014, with a Japanese release date planned for October 8, 2014. Like the prior games in the series, it was announced for the iOS, and Android operating systems, but unlike past iterations, it was also announced for the PlayStation Vita handheld video game console. The Vita version, titled, Chaos Rings III: Prequel Trilogy, contains all four titles in the Chaos Rings series - Chaos Rings, Chaos Rings Omega, Chaos Rings II and the third game. The Vita release is a full-fledged port, with a special edition release, and not a PlayStation Mobile port that was also playable on Vita, as the original Chaos Rings had been. The special edition also comes with an art book containing art by Final Fantasy artist Yusuke Naora, a CD with twelve remastered songs from Chaos Rings and Wild Arms composer Noriyasu Agematsu, and a code for crossover content for Diffusion Million Arthur, another Square Enix game for the Vita.

The game was released in English speaking regions on May 28, 2015 for iOS and Android. The game, by its creators, was expected to contain over 50 hours of gameplay. The game was present in playable form at the Tokyo Game Show in September 2014.

== Reception ==
Reception

Aggregate score
Aggregator	Score
Metacritic	79/100

Review score
Publication	Score
TouchArcade	5/5
