= Chaos Rings (video game) =

2010 video game

- App icon on Google Play Store
- Developer: Media.Vision
- Publisher: Square Enix
- Producer: Takehiro Ando
- Artist: Yusuke Naora
- Writer: Yukinori Kitajima
- Composer: Noriyasu Agematsu
- Series: Chaos Rings
- Platforms: iOS, Android, Windows Mobile, PlayStation Vita
- Release: iPhone; April 20, 2010 iPad; August 12, 2010; Android: JP: December 1, 2011; NA: October 10, 2012; Windows Mobile; March 28, 2013; PS Vita; July 24, 2013
- Genre: Role-playing
- Mode: Single-player

Chaos Rings (ケイオスリングス, Keiosu Ringusu) is a role-playing video game developed by Media.Vision and published by Square Enix. It was released worldwide in 2010 as an exclusive title for iOS, but it was later ported to Android, Windows Phone 7, and PlayStation Vita. Effective May 31, 2016, Square Enix ended distribution of this title, and it is no longer available for download or purchase. Produced by Takehiro Ando, characters were designed by Yusuke Naora, the art director of Final Fantasy VII, VIII, and X among other successful titles.

The game takes place in a mysterious place known as Ark Arena, where participants face enemies in both dungeons and tournament-play to avoid death and gain immortality. Chaos Rings features four scenarios. Each scenario is played by two different story characters and across several worlds, ending with a boss battle. A prequel, Chaos Rings Omega, was released on May 19, 2011, and two sequels, Chaos Rings II, released on March 15, 2012, and Chaos Rings III, released on October 16, 2014.

== Gameplay ==
Chaos Rings begins as a dungeon crawl where navigation and battles are done as a two-person party that is chosen prior to gameplay. Navigation takes place in a third-person perspective. Combat is controlled via a system of menus in a turn-based routine. During a player's turn, there is the option of attempting an escape from the battle, or to fight solo or as a pair. If solo mode is chosen, the player has the ability to choose an individual attack for each member of the party, while pair mode effectively makes the couple a single unit, capable of using each other's moves and having the best attributes of both. However, when in pair mode, both members of the party are open to a hit by a single enemy. In addition to attack, the player also has the ability to perform varied forms of magic known as "genes", to use items, or to simply defend against an enemy's attack.

A special feature in combat is the 'break' feature. Attacks made by the couple will decrease the break gauge if it is red (and thus on the enemies' side), and will increase their own if the attack kills a foe. When the break gauge favors one side, their attacks are more powerful, and the foe's are likewise weakened. Critical hits and abilities like Trompe L'oell have twice the influence of a regular attack on the break gauge.

After a successful battle, the duo receives experience points and Ohnz (abbreviated as "OZ"). Ohnz are the currency in Ark Arena, and can be used to purchase items, weapons, armor, and jewels to be used in combat.

== Plot ==
=== Setting ===
Chaos Rings takes place in a mysterious fictional location known as the Ark Arena that holds many dungeons. Characters begin the game by being automatically transported to the arena with no clear idea of how or why they have arrived there. Dungeons of the Ark Arena consist of mixed indoor and outdoor environments with mid-dungeon and ending boss battles. Characters have the ability to enter and leave dungeons as they please. When not in dungeon-play, characters return to a "home" area, where health points and magic points are instantly recovered.

The Ark Arena is described as an attempt to destroy a being known as the Qualia before it destroys every single time space that the Ark Arena has created by travelling back and forth through time, now for the 2003rd time. It is a place to train chosen couples from different parallel time spaces, eventually joining forces in order to defeat the Qualia. The Ark is designed to return to 10,000 years in the past when a couple is chosen as worthy, to germinate a new, genetically superior race. This process then repeats periodically, theoretically making contestants stronger at each Ark Arena contest, in the hopes to be powerful enough to face the Qualia itself in battle. It is also possible for the Ark to send a couple to the meeting point of the Qualia in another time space, thus making possible the meeting of couples from different time spaces.

=== Characters ===
The game features eight playable characters that were designed by Yusuke Naora. The game originally did not feature voice acting, but a later update added voice acting to key scenes in the game (only in Japanese). The characters consist of five couples: Garrick and Alto, Escher and Musiea, Olgar and Vahti, Eluca and Zhamo, and Ayuta and Mana. Garrick and Alto are not playable, as Garrick dies in the beginning and Alto is killed shortly after (her death varies across the storylines). Each couple has a unique story.

Escher (エッシャー, Esshā)
Voiced by: Junichi Suwabe
Born into royalty, he was kidnapped by thieves as a young boy. When it was obvious they would not get the ransom they desired for him, they cared for him and taught him their ways. Eventually, he was 'rescued' by knights who brought him back home. However, everyone looked down on him for his past. Unable to live in such circumstances, he left, and using his skills learnt by his adoptive family, became a cleaner for the underworld. On a mission to assassinate a traitor from his organization who had already taken care of the priest and nuns (who were selling children into slavery) from the orphanage where Musiea (Aida) was working. It is after Escher slays the traitor that Musiea walks in and brands him a murderer. Escher is also afflicted by a debilitating disease that manifests itself in hacking coughs.

Musiea (ミューシャ, Myūsha) / Aida (アイダ, Aida)
Voiced by: Marina Inoue
Escher's only childhood friend. She was brought to him, so he could watch over her, as the thieves looked around for someone interested in buying her. She and Escher became good friends. He helps her escape to avoid slavery, promising to find her again one day. Escher receives many beatings for this. She was brought to an orphanage, where her name was changed, and she was raised. She changed her name from Aida to Musiea when she was baptized.

Eluca (イルカ, Iruka)
Voiced by: Sayaka Ohara
The royal bodyguard and top warrior in a southern kingdom. She was about to behead Zhamo by the order of the 'Divine King' with his family when the sky came to complete darkness. She was envious of Zhamo because of his intelligence and manners, and with the finding that the warrior ring chose Zhamo instead of her. Later on, she makes up her mind to join Zhamo to overthrow the 'Divine King', though she is plagued by thoughts of what she must do if, and when they return to their kingdom, where she will still be under orders to kill him.

Zhamo (シャモ, Shamo)
Voiced by: Hiro Shimono
The prince of a southern kingdom. As he was about to be beheaded for defying the 'Divine King', he saw the light fade away and appeared in the Ark with his executioner, Eluca. He later says that he never hated Eluca, since she was acting as only the tool of the Divine King. His goal is to make a country where poverty does not exist by overthrowing the 'Divine King' once he returns to his world. He initially lacks confidence in himself but later becomes a warrior with the help and encouragement of Eluca and Escher in the Ark Arena.

Ayuta (アユタ, Ayuta)
Voiced by: Nobuhiko Okamoto
A stablehand of an eastern kingdom. He is a loyal servant of Princess Mana, with whom he is in love. He states that he thought of her an 'outgoing' person, and got to know her when she was doing archery training, and when she tried to ride a horse. It is revealed later explained in the story that the person Ayuta saw is actually Shea, the Princess' exchanger. His memories are suppressed, and it is with the help of Olgar and Vahti, who have defeated a 'ruthless, demonic' Ayuta in the previous Ark Arena, that they come back. It is then revealed that Ayuta was one of the people who organized the Ark Arena and was participating (with his memories suppressed to make his grisly work easier) in order to prevent the genetic threshold in the Ark Arenas from falling too low. He also reveals that the Ark was never meant to kill. Those who lost were simply to be released back to where they had been with their memories of the Ark suppressed, though they would still succumb to the Qualia shortly after.

Shea (ヤエ, Yae) / Mana (マナ, Mana)
Voiced by: Kana Hanazawa
Originally introduced as Princess Mana from an eastern kingdom, her true identity was later revealed as Shea, a body double to the real princess. She was supposed to keep the princess safe until her betrothal. She reveals her identity to Ayuta before the Arena battle against Olgar and Vahti. She is an outgoing person; she practices archery and horseback riding. The first time she meets Ayuta was when she falls from the horse she was riding and was rescued by Ayuta. Ayuta has feelings for Shea, and she, in return, also has feelings for Ayuta. She is secretly jealous because Ayuta still seems to have feelings for Theia, the original First Woman, whose consciousness has become the driving force behind the Ark 'In lieu of AI'. In the end, Ayuta chooses to live in Shea's world and Shea, in return, promises to Theia that if they ever have a daughter, it will be named after her. Theia gives them her blessing, and then finally dies after eons of time travel. It is unclear whether or not the Princess Manas in the other three time spaces are the true princess, or still one of her body doubles. During Olgar's story, it is revealed she has an incredibly powerful ability: to transform her own life force into a devastating arrow attack, which she used to obliterate the Executioner easily.

Olgar (オーガ, Ōga)
Voiced by: Unsho Ishizuka
The first to ever make it into two consecutive Ark Arenas, he is shown to be a brutal foe in combat, and coarse in speech. In his first Ark Arena, he killed his fiancee's own parents in combat (Chaos Rings Omega reveals the context, however). As his second Ark trip continues, he realizes what it is like to fight his own children, or rather, extremely removed descendants, who remember him and Vahti in myths, changing him for the better, though perhaps not for the best of the world. He chooses his first love, Vahti, over a look-alike with Theia's vastly superior, potentially world-saving genes, simply for his love, smashing down an eons-old and likewise skilled Ayuta to do so. He is also revealed to be the very first Divine King of Eluca and Zhamo's realm, from which came a myth of two saddened giants roaming the earth, creating mankind from their tears. The Agent in his plot line is different in that it absorbs subjects to gain their abilities, doing so with Theia's clone in his first fight, and with Princess Mana for her life force channeling abilities in the second battle. There appears to be no difference in the actual fights, however.

Vahti (ヴァティー, Vatī)
Voiced by: Ayano Niina
Though her husband is introduced as a juggernaut of war, Vahti shows so much sympathy with the other combatants that it is 'almost' like she's their own mother. Except for Ayuta, this is quite truthful. At some point before the third dungeon, she is kidnapped by Ayuta, placed into a cold sleep, and replaced with Theia's last clone, altered to have her exact memories, personality, appearance, and abilities. Olgar fights through the final dungeon alone in order to get her back, even though, according to Ayuta, his superior genes, along with Theia's, would be most certainly able to spawn a human race capable of defeating the Qualia. Later, after sustaining fatal wounds from the Executioner, she collapses against the might of the Agent, even as Olgar smashes him flat. As Olgar grieves, Mana manages to transfer what was left of her life force after using it to defeat the Executioner, once, to Vahti, preserving her life at the cost of Ayuta's and her own.

=== Story ===
In Chaos Rings four couples compete in the ominously named Ark Arena (one extra pair, Garrick and Alto, voiced by Shin-ichiro Miki and Asami Seto respectively, are eliminated early on in all four storylines and cannot be selected for play). In the beginning, Garrick attempts to attack the Agent, the apparent director of the Arena's events. The Agent states that those who do not follow the rules shall be killed, and a grim reaper-like monster comes and his body dissipates in a cloud of purple mist. The Agent also says that immortality and eternal youth await the champions of the Ark Arena. He then allows the remaining couples to enter a door, and find the first ring, the Warrior's ring required to fight in the Ark Arena. When the couples come back, they are sent out once again to gather the other required ring, the Companion's Ring. When the first round of battles begins, the couple the player is playing as will always have to win. Once the couple wins, they are sent to find proof of why they have been selected to fight in the Ark together, after which they must fight other humans once again. After the final battle is won, the couple will have to call the Agent to speak to him. He says that the couple must fight him to become immortal. After he is defeated, he says something to 'the Almighty' regarding their incredible power.

The couple will appear back in the main room where the dungeon door now has an option named 'Original Door'. If Original Door is chosen, the player will see a cutscene where the characters appear on Earth 10,000 years ago. They have been chosen because of their superior DNA to start a new human race strong enough to defeat a monstrous being called the Qualia. They are granted immortality and eternal youth. It is also shown that the Ark Arena is a floating ship that travels through time.

If the player saves after the credits and reloads the game, the dungeon door will have a new option named 'Bereshith Road' where a whole new story unwinds. The grim reaper-like creature is revealed to be the Executioner (though its name is revealed earlier in the Ayuta-Mana/Shea route), and his purpose is to remove insubordinate or defeated competitors in the Ark Arena. He must be fought and killed. Next, the players enter a room where documents explaining the Ark Arena, the Agent, and the Executioner are held. It is learned that both the Executioner and the Agent are artificial organisms that are programmed to ensure the smooth running of the Ark Arena. Soon afterwards, they stumble upon the terrible Arena itself. Later, they find the Agent, who is to test them once more. This time he is called the 'True Agent' and is much more powerful, attacking twice per turn, one of the few foes who can. Once he is defeated, the couple learns of a 'Final Door' that leads to the Qualia. They go up another level (Bereshith Road is actually a moving platform that goes up to higher levels, where more and more powerful beings are held), to find yet another powerful being, the Almighty. The Almighty is the creator of the Ark Arena and the operator of it. It is a woman's body that extends from the floor, appearing to be part of the Ark itself. If she is defeated, then the couple arrives at the top floor, and a glowing red vortex awaits their arrival.

As they enter it, the chosen couple comes across with the other three couples they thought had been defeated in the past arena battles. It is later then explained by Ayuta, who has recovered his original memories, that each of their story is true, since the people they were forced to kill were of different timespaces. They then encounter the Qualia, which envelops the Earth almost immediately. They are staggered by its sheer power, but then regain their strength and composure and go on to defeat the Qualia.

The Qualia is defeated, but more Qualia emerge from the parallel timespaces that they have destroyed. With their limited strength, the four couples once again lose hope, until Theia tells them to see the miracle they created for their resistance to destruction. With a burst of light, hundreds of starships, supposedly crewed by the parallel timespace's denizens, appears and completely annihilate the Qualia.

With Theia's last strength, she sends the couples back to the dimensional time and space of their choice. The couples choose to return to the period before they were summoned to the Ark. Finally, Theia issues the command to shut down the ancient Ark, finally terminating the endless timespace-generating spiral.

== Music ==
Noriyasu Agematsu, of the musical group Elements Garden, composed all the music to Chaos Rings.

Following the release of the game, Square Enix released the Chaos Rings Original Soundtrack for digital download on June 23, 2010 via the iTunes Store. According to one of the game's assistant producers, Hiroaki Iwano, the soundtrack was released primarily due to popular demand.

== Reception ==
Reception

Aggregate score
Aggregator	Score
Metacritic	(iPhone) 92/100 (iPad) 91/100

Review scores
Publication	Score
4Players	57%
Destructoid	9.5/10
Edge	8/10
GamePro	4/5
Gamezebo	5/5
GameZone	8.5/10
IGN	9/10
Jeuxvideo.com	18/20
Pocket Gamer	4.5/5
RPGFan	(iPhone) 90% (iPad) 87%
TouchArcade	5/5

The iPhone and iPad versions received "universal acclaim" according to the review aggregation website Metacritic.

== Sequel and prequel ==
Square Enix has published three more games in the Chaos Rings series to date. A trailer of the prequel entitled Chaos Rings Omega has since been released. Chaos Rings Omega was released on May 19, 2011 in North America and the next day in Japan.

Omega has many similarities to the first game. The gameplay and navigation are still the same, while the setting is slightly changed on its layout. The game stars a mostly new set of characters, though the first game's Olgar (with a different name), Vahti, and Ayuta are all playable as well. The storyline features twists not seen in the first game, said twists sending the plot off in a completely different direction than before. On May 20, 2011, a teaser trailer for Chaos Rings II was released.

Chaos Rings III was later released on October 16, 2014, and is the only game in the series that's still widely available.
