= Noriyasu Agematsu =

Japanese composer (born 1978)

Noriyasu Agematsu 上松 範康
- Born: March 1, 1978 (age 48); Azumino, Nagano, Japan
- Genres: Soundtrack; anime song
- Occupations: Composer; arranger; music producer
- Years active: 2004–present
- Member of: Elements Garden
- Website: www.ariamusic.co.jp

Noriyasu Agematsu (上松 範康, Agematsu Noriyasu; born March 1, 1978 in Nagano) is a Japanese composer, arranger and music producer, as well as founding member of the musical group Elements Garden.

He composed and arranged tracks on Nana Mizuki's singles Massive Wonders and Eternal Blaze, "Brave Phoenix" on the single Super Generation and the track "Tears' Night" on the album Alive & Kicking, composed the track Shin'ai and the music for "UNCHAIN∞WORLD" on the single Silent Bible. He composed and arranged the music for the track "Heart-shaped chant" on the single Secret Ambition and the track Justice to Believe. He composed the music for the track Mugen and the tracks "Trickster" and "DISCOTHEQUE" from the single Trickster. Along with his fellow Elements Garden members, he is the composer and arranger for the BanG Dream! franchise, including overseeing music production for its anime.

== Works ==
=== Anime ===
Year	Title	Note(s)	Ref(s)
2004	Girls Bravo		
2005	Moeyo Ken		
2008	Rosario + Vampire	Arranger; opening and ending theme song composer and arranger	
2008	Ga-Rei -Zero-		
2009	Kiddy Girl-and		
2010	Blessing of the Campanella		
2011	Uta no Prince-sama series	The original, planning draft and music producer	
2012	Symphogear series	Original music producer and series creator	
2012	Bodacious Space Pirates		
2015	The Idolmaster Cinderella Girls		
2017	BanG Dream!		
2018	That Time I Got Reincarnated as a Slime		
2021	Visual Prison		
2022	Technoroid Overmind		
2025	Princession Orchestra	Original planner and series creator	

=== Video games ===
Year	Title	Ref(s)
2006	Wild Arms 5	
2007	Wild Arms XF	
2008	White Knight Chronicles	
2010	Chaos Rings	
2010	White Knight Chronicles II	
2010	Super Robot Wars OG Saga: Endless Frontier Exceed	
2011	White Knight Chronicles: Origins	
2011	Chaos Rings Omega	
2011	The Little Battlers	
2012	Chaos Rings II	
2014	Chaos Rings III	
2015	Final Fantasy Brave Exvius	
2016	Grand Summoners	
2019	War of the Visions: Final Fantasy Brave Exvius	
2022	The Idolmaster Million Live!	
2026	Final Fantasy Resonance	
