= White Knight Chronicles =

2008 video game

- North American box art depicting Wisel, the White Knight
- Developers: Level-5; Japan Studio
- Publisher: Sony Computer Entertainment
- Director: Akihiro Hino
- Producer: Akihiro Hino
- Designer: Akihiro Hino
- Writer: Akihiro Hino
- Composers: Takeshi Inoue; Yumiko Hashizume; Noriyasu Agematsu
- Platform: PlayStation 3
- Release: JP: December 25, 2008; JP: October 8, 2009 (EX edition); NA: February 2, 2010; AU: February 25, 2010; EU: March 5, 2010
- Genre: Role-playing
- Modes: Single-player, multiplayer

White Knight Chronicles (Note: Known in Japan as Shirokishi Monogatari: Inishie no Kodō (白騎士物語 -古の鼓動-; lit. White Knight Story: Ancient Heartbeat)) is a role-playing video game developed by Level-5 and Japan Studio and published by Sony Computer Entertainment for the PlayStation 3. It is Level-5's first project for the system. As of August 2009, it has sold 350,000 copies in Japan. A sequel titled White Knight Chronicles II was released in Japan in 2010. A related game for the PlayStation Portable, titled White Knight Chronicles: Origins, was released in Japan, Europe and, Australia in 2011.

== Gameplay ==
White Knight Chronicles is a role-playing video game presented in a third-person perspective. The player can freely pick which character to control. The characters gain experience points and level up, becoming stronger over the course of the game.

The player can select locations on a world map that has already been visited to go to instantly. The player can also see a preview of the selected location along with a list of quests that have not been completed. The player can choose a quest to embark upon before going to the desired location.

The battle system used in White Knight Chronicles is a real-time system where the battle mode can be initiated when enemies are present. Before a battle, the player can go into the "Battle Preparation" menu (accessible at any time) and choose up to three sets of seven commands for each character in the party. This set of twenty one commands is called a "Command Setup" and several of these setups can be saved for switching between classes. Commands can also be linked in order to create combos to use in battle. The player controls one of the characters while the others are controlled by the AI. The player can freely change the character they are controlling. The main character can transform into the White Knight using action chips which are acquired by defeating enemies. Boss battles also take place in a similar fashion except that they may include cutscenes for in-battle events.

Enemies can be attacked with various kinds of elemental attack magic, while the player can heal the party by resorting to divine magic. Magic is an essential part of the White Knight Chronicles battle system, but it comes with one pitfall—Magic skills do not improve a character's physical strength. This means magic users must avoid enemy attacks.

After defeating an enemy, the player will obtain materials. Materials are used for crafting and upgrading armor, weapons, accessories and items, as well as building Georama parts.

=== Georama ===
The Georama system is an online mode that lets the player create their own town. It can function as a lobby and allows the player to set up shops and harvest spots. People can enter this virtual town and also take a look around. The editing mode functions as a system that can be placed from a list of objects ranging from houses and other garden accessories to anything customizable for the town. Towns can be placed in the middle of plains, deserts, or wilderness with six different field types. Other items can also help to shape the hub including elevated platforms, embankments, and trees. The georama system was also in Level-5's Dark Cloud series. Non-player characters can be recruited to towns from locations around the world map. This makes the player's Georama change depending on whoever is living in it. NPCs have jobs and specific skill levels which will affect the kind of materials and items available to use in Georama. Each Geonet has up to 20 rooms for players to join. A maximum of 12 people can visit a room at one time, and up to four can take on a quest together.

== Plot ==
White Knight Chronicles begins in the kingdom of Balandor, where Princess Cisna is having a coming-of-age banquet. Leonard, the main protagonist; his childhood friend, Yulie; and the Avatar (a new employee at Rapacci Wines, where the three work), are tasked with delivering wine for the party. Once the delivery is finished, they decide to stay for the party, that is soon raided by an evil organization called the Magi. In the ensuing commotion, King Valtos, Cisna's father, is killed by a man in dark armor, causing a shocked Cisna to regain her voice (which was "lost" when her mother, Queen Floraine, was assassinated). Leonard grabs the distraught Cisna's hand and leads her to safety in the castle's lower levels. There, they find a suit of armor, an "Incorruptus", and a strange gauntlet called the "Ark". Using the Ark to merge with the armor, Leonard becomes the White Knight, which is capable of fighting the Magi. After eliminating a monster from the castle, Cisna is kidnapped by the Magi. Sarvain, the royal advisor, tasks Leonard to rescue the Princess with the White Knight. Yulie, the Avatar, and a "humble traveler" named Eldore join him.

The motive behind the kidnapping is Cisna's ability to unlock sealed Knights, of which she is unaware of at first. The leader of Magi is a general called Dregias, the man who killed Valtos. All that is known about him is he is capable of transforming into the winged Black Knight, Ebonwings.

== Development and release ==
Level-5 conceived White Knight Chronicles to have 50 or 60 hours of gameplay, a length Akihiro Hino considers to be a full role-playing game, going against the pressure to make White Knight Chronicles a launch title and cut the story short.

The music was composed by Takeshi Inoue, Yumiko Hashizume, and Noriyasu Agematsu. Orchestration was done by Hideo Inai, lyrics by Akihiro Hino, and vocals by Kazco Hamano who sung the main theme song, "Travelers" and the ending theme, "Shards of Time". The North American release removed the original Japanese voices for "Travelers" and "Shards of Time", replacing them with English-dubbing.

The official White Knight Chronicles soundtrack was released on two discs on July 1, 2009, by Aniplex.

A web exclusive prequel manga called Shirokishi Monogatari: Episode 0 Dogma Senki (White Knight Chronicles Episode 0: Dogma War Chronicles) was released in 2008. Takashi Ikeda oversaw the story for this prequel with Yūko Satō illustrating the actual manga in collaboration with Media Factory's Comic Alive editorial department. The story takes place 10,000 years before the main game's story in an era at war. It follows the story of another White Knight who predates the White Knight hero character of the game.

== Reception ==
Reception

Aggregate score
Aggregator	Score
Metacritic	64/100

Review scores
Publication	Score
Eurogamer	8/10
Famitsu	29/40
GameSpot	6/10
IGN	5.1/10
X-Play	3/5

White Knight Chronicles received mixed reviews, with an aggregated score of 64/100 on Metacritic. Famitsu gave the game a 29/40, with the reviewers highlighting the online mode as being the source of their main complaints. Despite the mediocre reviews, the game sold well, around 130,000 copies on its first day and roughly 207,000 in its first week in Japan. Eurogamer gave the game an 8/10, criticizing the multiplayer, with the explanation that "disappointing multiplayer doesn't take away from how enjoyable the game is, or how well-thought-through and impressively integrated its gameplay systems are".

== Sequels ==
A sequel titled White Knight Chronicles II was released in 2010, followed by a prequel titled White Knight Chronicles: Origins in 2011.
