= Code Age =

- Logo for the Code Age project
- Developer: Square Enix
- Publisher: Square Enix
- Creator: Yusuke Naora
- Platforms: Mobile phone, PlayStation 2
- First release: Code Age Archives; February 12, 2005
- Latest release: Code Age Brawls; December 19, 2005

Code Age (コード・エイジ, Kōdo Eiji) is a 2005 multimedia franchise developed and published by Square Enix. It was created by Yusuke Naora and split between three projects; the manga Code Age Archives, the mobile role-playing video game Code Age Brawls, and the PlayStation 2 action role-playing game Code Age Commanders. Code Age uses a science fiction setting on the inner surface of a hollow world similar to a Dyson sphere. The narratives revolve around an apocalyptic threat to civilization, with the protagonists gaining powers from absorbing monsters dubbed the Otellos.

The concept for Code Age was created in 2002, being adopted into Square Enix's "polymorphic content" strategy of producing series across multiple platforms and media. The development team behind the project went under the name "Warhead". Naora led production and created the story for the series, Toshiyuki Itahana designed the characters and directed Commanders, and Kumi Tanioka composed the music for Commanders and Brawls. The manga was created by Aya Kyu under Warhead's supervision, with Naora designing the characters.

The manga Archives was serialised Monthly Shōnen Gangan from 2005 to 2006. The console game Commanders was planned for a Western release, but this was cancelled after the translation had been completed. The mobile entry Brawls operated for less than a year before closing down in September 2006. Reception of Commanders and Brawls was generally positive from Western critics, though Commanders met with low sales in Japan. The Code Age project was also noted for its ambitious multimedia approach at the time.

== Overview ==
Code Age is a multimedia franchise developed and published by Japanese company Square Enix. The franchise, created by artist Yusuke Naora, is divided between three projects; Code Age Archives, Code Age Brawls, and Code Age Commanders. While the three Code Age projects are different genres and media, all share the same science fiction-themed universe, taking place over a prolonged span of time. Each project was abbreviated using a lettering formula; "CAA" stood for Archives, "CAB" for Brawls, and "CAC" for Commanders.

The series takes place inside an "intraglobular world" (球内世界, kyuunai sekai), a fictional hollow world similar to a Dyson sphere, with people living on its internal surface; at the sphere's center is the Central Code, a structure which resets the world every ten thousand years by wiping out the current civilization in an event called the Reborn. In an attempt to survive the next Reborn, its residents construct Arks around the Central Code. The plan fails as the Arks are struck out of orbit, and the population is attacked by Otellos, a species that mutates people into mindless Coded. Ark survivors can absorb Coded, transforming into powerful warriors dubbed Warheads. Survivors splinter into factions, some fighting each other and others hiding underground. The narrative of each property is standalone, but also ties into the storylines of the other Code Age projects. Recurring characters across the different media include Gene, a protagonist from Commanders; and R, who appears in Brawls and acts as a central antagonist in Archives.

=== Code Age Archives ===
- Code Age Archive

コード・エイジ アーカイヴズ ～最後におちてきた少女～ (Kōdo Eiji Ākaivuzu: Saigo ni Ochite Kita Shōjo)
- Genre: Science fiction
- Created by: Warhead
- Manga
- Written by: Aya Kyu
- Published by: Square Enix
- Imprint: Gangan Comics
- Magazine: Monthly Shōnen Gangan
- Original run: February 12, 2005 – February 10, 2006
- Volumes: 3

Code Age Archive: Saigo ni Ochite Kita Shōjo is a manga that follows Thayne and Nico, high school friends who survive the collapse of the Arks and are forced to survive the ruined world. It began serialization in Square Enix's Monthly Shōnen Gangan magazine on February 12, 2005, with the first issue incorporating full color panels. The final issue was published on February 10, 2006. A prequel chapter was released as a pre-order bonus for Commanders bundled with the first issue in color. The manga was released in three volumes by Square Enix on July 22 and October 12, 2005, and March 22, 2006.

=== Code Age Brawls ===
Code Age Brawls: Futatsu no Kodō is a role-playing video game released for mobile phones. It released five episodes between December 15, 2005, and July 3, 2006. The game follows Lost L, a survivor transformed into an incomplete Warhead and forced to consume other Warheads to survive. Gameplay has the character going through an episodic narrative and fighting in command-based battles, with multiplayer allowing different players to fight each other. Western previews of the game's pre-release demo gave praised to its graphics, while a Japanese review at release praised the combat while faulting frequent server connection issues during multiplayer matches.

=== Code Age Commanders ===
Code Age Commanders: Tsugu Mono Tsugareru Mono is an action role-playing game released for the PlayStation 2 on October 13, 2005. Taking the role of multiple characters in the aftermath of the Reborn, the player navigates missions fighting opponents in real-time combat, evolving their character over the course of the game and using skills which are inherited by each playable character in turn. Reception to Commanders was positive overall, with many citing its gameplay as enjoyable despite a lack of depth, and praise was given to its story and art design.

== History ==
Naora created the concept for Code Age in 2002 as a contrast to his work on Final Fantasy and SaGa; a world which could play host to multiple stories. He created the concept prior to the 2003 merger of Square with Enix to become Square Enix. Following the merger, Code Age was adopted into Square Enix's plan for "polymorphic content", a marketing and sales strategy to "[provide] well-known properties on several platforms, allowing exposure of the products to as wide an audience as possible"; this approach included Compilation of Final Fantasy VII and the World of Mana. Naora's original concept was for the two video games Commanders and Brawls due to Square's focus on gaming, creating the manga Archives following the merger as Enix had a manga publishing division. While an anime would have been a more traditional media expansion, Naora wanted to avoid assumptions that the games were an anime spin-off. While he felt pressure from Square Enix's management due to the project's ambition, he felt greater pressure finding the right staff for each project.

Each of the Code Age titles was developed or overseen by "Warhead", a development body created by Naora to manage the franchise. The "Warhead" team was notable as it was led by artists rather than traditional game developers. Naora acted as producer and supervisor for the Code Age projects, in addition to creating concept artwork. The development team for Commanders featured many of the same staff as Final Fantasy Crystal Chronicles. Toshiyuki Itahana created the lead character designs for Commanders and Brawls; he also directed Commanders, with the game being his debut as a director. The music for the two game properties was composed by Kumi Tanioka. The manga was illustrated by Aya Kyu, a then-new artist who would later create the manga adaptation of Persona 4 Arena.

The narrative theme of Code Age how people react and behave when terrible events happen around them; he was inspired by a phenomenon he saw of people having detached attitudes to car accidents and natural disasters not experienced in person. The design of the lead characters focused on their hair first, and incorporated contemporary references into their clothing design. The gameplay design of Commanders, particularly its customization system, was intended to appeal to a Western audience. For Brawls, the development team wanted to expand upon the multiplayer communication system used for Before Crisis: Final Fantasy VII. Naora created the character designs for Archives, with CGI artwork from the other Code Age projects being incorporated into the manga. The comic was created on a PC computer, turning CGI illustrations of the characters into the manga art, then adding in backgrounds and speech bubbles. Naora commented that particular attention was paid to the art as many of the series leads were artists themselves.

Trademarks for the Code Age properties were registered in March 2004. Commanders and Archives were announced first, with the announcement of Brawls coinciding with Square Enix showing the franchise off with a trailer at a press conference prior to E3 2005. Naora and the team were concerned about releasing Commanders outside Japan as it would coincide with the release window of the PlayStation 3. He also said that further Code Age projects would depend on public reception of Commanders and Brawls. Both Commanders and Brawls were scheduled for a 2006 release in North America, but ultimately none of the Code Age franchise was released outside Japan. Brawls was shut down on September 30, 2006. Square Enix confirmed the following year that the Code Age titles would not be published by them overseas. Localization staff member Christopher "Koji" Fox, who later notably worked on Final Fantasy XIV, had completed the translation of Commanders before Square Enix cancelled its localization.

== Reception ==
Code Age Commanders sold 37,000 units in its first week of release in Japan, a strong start for a new franchise; debuting at number two in the game sales charts. It sold over 61,000 copies in Japan by the end of 2005. Ultimately RPGFan attributed the localization's cancellation on both low sales and poor reception in Japan.

Julian Aiden of Hardcore Gamer noted Square Enix's ambition in attempting to launch multiple linked projects in this way despite its ultimate failure. Play Magazine's Nick DesBarres noted that the involved nature of the Code Age project and complexities of releasing all three properties at once impeded any chances of localization. Similarly, Siliconera's Spencer Yip negatively felt that the series's multimedia status made importing Commanders less appealing due to the missing story context.
