= Chaos Rings =

Role playing video game

- The logo of the first Chaos Rings.
- Genre: Role-playing
- Developer: Media.Vision
- Publisher: Square Enix
- Creator: Takehiro Ando
- Platforms: Android, iOS, PlayStation Mobile, PlayStation Vita, Windows Phone
- First release: Chaos Rings: WW: April 20, 2010
- Latest release: Chaos Rings III: JP: October 16, 2014; WW: May 28, 2015

Chaos Rings is a role-playing video game series released primarily on mobile platforms. It is developed by Media.Vision and published by Square Enix. The eponymous first game in the series was released for iOS in 2010, then later ported to other mobile and portable platforms including Android and PlayStation Vita. There are currently four games in the Chaos Rings series, and each uses the same gameplay base. Effective May 31, 2016, Square Enix ended distribution of the first three games in the series on Google Play and Apple's App Store, leaving Chaos Rings III as the only title still available for download or purchase on those markets.

The series was created by Takehiro Ando as a traditional role-playing game created within the restrictions of a mobile environment. Subsequent games adopted slightly different styles: Omega was an expansion on Chaos Rings' story using the original engine, while the subsequent two games used rebuilt engines. Chaos Rings III saw the biggest shift for the series, with gameplay more similar to conventional role-playing games and a lighter tone to its story. The series has met with positive reception, and as of 2015 the series has received one million downloads worldwide.

== Titles ==
The series extends across four titles, all released on iOS and Android. Other platforms include Windows Phone, PlayStation Mobile and PlayStation Vita. A multiplayer social game, Chaos Rings Sigma, was originally in development for mobile platforms. First announced in July 2013, its scenario was written by the first game's writer Yukinori Kitajima, and featured all the series' core characters along with characters exclusive to Sigma. It was cancelled in 2015 for unspecified reasons.

Release timeline
2010	Chaos Rings
2011	Chaos Rings Omega
2012	Chaos Rings II
2013
2014	Chaos Rings III

- Chaos Rings, the first entry in the series, was released exclusively for iOS in April 2010, then later ported to Android, Windows Phone and PlayStation Mobile. A PlayStation Vita port was first released as part of Chaos Rings III: Prequel Trilogy in 2014, then as a standalone title in 2015. The game was later released for the Vita in May 2015. Chaos Rings follows five couples through a tournament in the Ark Arena where the prize is immortality. Voice acting was added to the game in 2011. Chaos Rings was adapted into a manga by Kitajima. The manga was released in two volumes in 2012.
- Chaos Rings Omega is a prequel to the original game, released originally for iOS in April 2011. It was later released for Android in November 2012. A Vita port was first released as part of Chaos Rings III: Prequel Trilogy in 2014, then as a standalone title in 2015. Set 10,000 years prior to the first game, it focuses on four different couples pitted against each other in the Ark Arena.
- Chaos Rings II, the second entry in the series, was released on iOS in March 2012. A release for Android followed in March the following year. A Vita port was first released as part of Chaos Rings III: Prequel Trilogy in 2014, then as a standalone title in 2015. It was released for the Vita in May 2015. The story follows mercenary Darwin as he is chosen by the Creator to be the Nominator, a figure who must choose people to die so the world can be preserved.
- Chaos Rings III, the third entry in the series, was released for both iOS and Android in October 2014. The English version was released in May 2015. It was released for the Vita in 2014 under the title Chaos Rings III: Prequel Trilogy: alongside the game, download codes for Vita versions of the past three Chaos Rings titles were included. A standalone version for Vita was released in 2015. The story follows Nasca, who is drawn into a quest to reach the fabled planet Marble Blue, home to a mystical place known as Paradisos. When updated in the West in September, the game contained a bug which crashed the game when a certain boss event was triggered. This was fixed with a patch issued in February 2016.

== Series gameplay ==
A battle in the original Chaos Rings, showing the party, enemy, and standard HUD. These elements have been repeated throughout the series.

The gameplay of the Chaos Rings series has remained consistent throughout its lifetime: players navigate dungeon or open-area environments in 3D, navigating the game's chosen characters with touch screen controls. The series follows fairly traditional role-playing mechanics, with players progressing the story through quests, and accepting side quests for rewards of experience points and in-game currency. The first three games restrict the player party to two people, while Chaos Rings III uses a traditional three-person party with backup characters in reserve. In addition to attack, the player also has the ability to perform varied forms of magic using card-like objects known as "genes", to use items, or to simply defend against an enemy's attack. A special feature in combat is the 'break' feature. Attacks made by the couple will decrease the break gauge if it is red (and thus on the enemies' side), and will increase their own if the attack kills a foe. When the break gauge favors one side, their attacks are more powerful, and the foe's are likewise weakened.

== Development ==
All entries in the Chaos Rings series were developed by Media.Vision, a Japanese game developer whose most notable previous work included the Wild Arms series. The series’ creator and producer is Takehiro Ando, whose previous work included Crystal Defenders. While developing the game, one of the elements that proved challenging was the incorporating of 3D character models within a mobile environment. While working within the standard gameplay functions of a Japanese role-playing game, Ando wanted to focus on the main characters' psychology within a limited world. Media.Vision was brought in due to their technical knowledge, and managed to expand the previous limits of development for mobiles. Omega was developed to expand upon the story of Chaos Rings using the same systems. Chaos Rings II was in development alongside Omega, with the game's engine being rebuilt from scratch. Like Chaos Rings, it adopted a dark tone to its story. For Chaos Rings III, the game was restructured again, but this time they revamped the gameplay and adopted a lighter tone for the story. The series' music was handled throughout the entire series by Noriyasu Agematsu, composer and songwriter for Elements Garden. All titles apart from Chaos Rings III were seemingly permanently removed from the App stores in the wake of growing technical issues.

== Reception ==
Aggregate review scores
Game	Metacritic
Chaos Rings	92/100 (16 reviews)
Chaos Rings Omega	82/100 (10 reviews)
Chaos Rings II	86/100 (13 reviews)
Chaos Rings III	79/100 (6 reviews)

The original Chaos Rings was a commercial success upon release, generating 200,000 downloads worldwide within a year of its release. When it released, the physical Vita collection Chaos Rings III: Prequel Trilogy received strong sales, reaching the top five in Japanese gaming charts with initial sales of 12,436 units. In the following weeks, the release had dropped substantially in the charts, but still achieved accumulative sales of 22,193. As of 2015, the series has received one million downloads worldwide, making it one of the more successful mobile role-playing series available.

The Chaos Rings series has garnered critical acclaim from critics worldwide. Aggregate website Metacritic gave each game respective scores of 92/100, 82/100, 86/100 and 79/100. The original Chaos Rings received the highest score based on 16 reviews, while Chaos Rings III received the lowest score of the series based on 6 reviews. IGN, in an article on mobile gaming, mentioned the Chaos Rings as a high-quality role-playing series.
