= Code Age Commanders =

2005 video game

Code Age Commanders: Tsugu Mono Tsugareru Mono
- Developer(s): Square Enix
- Publisher(s): Square Enix
- Director(s): Toshiyuki Itahana
- Producer(s): Yusuke Naora
- Designer(s): Kazuhiko Aoki
- Programmer(s): Mitsuru Kamiyama
- Artist(s): Yusuke Naora; Toshiyuki Itahana
- Writer(s): Masato Yagi
- Composer(s): Kumi Tanioka; Yasuhiro Yamanaka
- Series: Code Age
- Platform(s): PlayStation 2
- Release: JP: October 13, 2005
- Genre(s): Action role-playing
- Mode(s): Single-player

Code Age Commanders: Tsugu Mono Tsugareru Mono (コード・エイジ コマンダーズ ～継ぐ者 継がれる者～) is a Japan-exclusive action role-playing game developed and published by Square Enix on October 13, 2005, for the PlayStation 2. It is part of the Code Age series, a franchise created by video game artist Yusuke Naora and designed to span different interweaved titles in multiple platforms and media. The series consists of Commanders, the mobile phone game Code Age Brawls, and the manga Code Age Archives. The story depicts the struggles of people surviving in a fictional "intraglobular world" menaced by impending destruction, mysterious warped creatures, and different factions warring against each other. The game focuses successively on the viewpoints of four main protagonists.

The concept for Code Age was created in 2002 by Yusuke Naora, becoming incorporated into Square Enix's polymorphic content policy of showing off their properties across multiple media. The development was handled by a group dubbed "Warhead", and featured multiple developers from Final Fantasy Crystal Chronicles including director and character designer Toshiyuki Itahana, and composer Kumi Tanioka. Reviews of the game were relatively positive, with high praises of its graphics and art direction but more mixed feelings for its complex and atypical gameplay.

== Gameplay ==
Code Age Commanders is an action role-playing game divided in missions, in which the goal is to fight enemies called "Coded" to reach a certain area of the map, where a boss must sometimes be defeated. The player controls one character while other allies are computer-controlled and must not die for the mission to be successful. Between two missions, the player can select in a menu numerous optional cut scenes to watch and which reveal the memories of the Coded defeated, while stages already completed can be re-explored. The game features four successive main playable characters, and items and skills learned by one is each time passed to the next.

Gene battles against two enemies

Weapons are equipped on both hands of the characters and are used with the circle and cross buttons. Pressing both buttons in succession is necessary to execute combos. The other buttons are used to lock focus onto an enemy, guard, dash, or manually change the camera angle. The number of attacks and blocks is limited by an energy meter for each arm, which decreases after each move but replenishes with time.

A third meter increases after each combo and allows when maxed out to perform a "Code Drive" attack. Executed with the triangle button, a Code Drive triggers a brief close-up sequence in which a blue circle appears around the character. If the player presses a second button before the circle shifts to red, a powerful special attack will be unleashed. If the enemy blocks the Code Drive, a second, shorter close-up sequence is triggered. Enemies can also perform Code Drives, in which case the player's button press allows for protection rather than attack. Executing Code Drives frequently can cause the weapon used to upgrade, or the character to go into a "Code Crisis"; a mode which reduces speed and renders immune to attack, but slowly drains hit points.

=== Customization ===
In addition to Coded, enemy creatures include "Otellos", which can either be defeated normally or be absorbed, mutating one of the protagonist's arm into a new form with new abilities. Depending on their types, absorbed Otellos can be used to fight, heal or be shot as a projectile weapon. Multiple Otellos can be absorbed into each arm and switched for usage, although gathering too many may result in an "Overload" mode in which attack power is boosted; but one Otello must be dropped quickly or the character's hit points will decrease steadily and continually.

Characters do not level up in a way similar to standard role-playing games; instead, stats evolve according to two coexistent systems. The "Self Evolution System" alters stats and skills depending on their usage during battle: for instance, a repeated use of left-handed attacks increases the character's left arm strength, while running around often increases their speed. The second system is the "Code Extension" mode, in which Code Points can be spent on either of the two arms or up to four body slots to increase their stats or acquire new skills. Code Points are earned after each mission in amounts that depend on the quantity of "Dropped Code" collected from defeated enemies, as well as mission clear time, and damage done and taken. When replaying completed stages, the number of Code Points earned is the difference between the player's highest past score for the mission and the new score obtained.

== Plot ==
=== Setting ===
Code Age Commanders is set in an "intraglobular world" (球内世界, kyuunai sekai), a fictional hollow world similar to a Dyson sphere, with people living on its internal surface. The center of the sphere is occupied by the "Central Code", a spherical structure which goes through a transformation called "Reborn" about every ten thousand years, destroying all life on the globe and allowing for the birth of a new one.

The game begins near the end of a Central Code cycle, while mankind has learned about the impending disaster and built "Arks", flying stations intended to float in the sky and house most of them in a deep sleep state for the duration of the Reborn. The operation works for one hundred years before objects falling from the Central Code hit the Arks and cause them to crash to the surface. Its passengers die or awake, now at the mercy of those who remained on the ground as well as the Otellos; a new, warped species which arose from the dropped pieces of the Central Code. The Otellos seek humans to turn them into mindless puppets named "Coded", although the mutation fails on people from the Arks and results in free and extremely evolved hybrids called "Warheads".

Knowing this, several humans seek Otellos voluntarily to become Warheads and try to protect mankind with the powers gained from the mutation. Several armed factions form with differing points of view on the way to save the world, while the Reborn still has not been completed.

=== Characters ===
The events of the game unfold successively from the viewpoints of four different Warhead protagonists. The first one is Gene, a young man who becomes amnesic after the Arks accident. He is the son of professor Alvin, one of the builders of the Arks, who disappeared some time after the accident. While searching for his sister Aliz kidnapped by a strange creature, Gene is mutated into a Warhead and watches his arm turning into a weapon during a battle against some Otellos. He is assisted by a small floating companion named Pake, and is later joined by the Warhead Kilroy, who was an assistant to professor Alvin, and Meme, a mysterious but determined, optimistic young female Warhead.

The second protagonist, Fiona, is a soldier of the White Army of Guinevere, who saved her life. Commander Guinevere, a Warhead, was a female scientist who worked in the Arks with professor Alvin. Fiona is initially very loyal to Guinevere, but becomes more reluctant following the death of a friend and the commander's changing, more dominating behavior.

The third protagonist is Gerald, a member of the Black Army of Sullivan. Also very loyal, Gerald nevertheless wonders why people do not unite to face the common threat represented by the Otellos. Commander Sullivan was another companion of professor Alvin and Guinevere, and also became a Warhead. His divergence of opinions with the White Army forced him to gather his own distinct army.

The fourth and final protagonist is Haze Healy, a member of the Keepers, a faction opposed to both the White and Black Armies.

== Development ==
Artist Yusuke Naora created the concept for Code Age in 2002, wanting to create something unlike his work Final Fantasy and SaGa; a world which could play host to multiple stories. He created the concept prior to the 2003 merger of Square and Enix to become Square Enix. Code Age formed part of Square Enix's plan to develop "polymorphic content", a marketing and sales strategy to "[provide] well-known properties on several platforms, allowing exposure of the products to as wide an audience as possible"; this approach included Compilation of Final Fantasy VII and the World of Mana. Naora's concept was created independent of this policy, and he later said that while there was pressure from the company when creating Code Age as a multimedia franchise, the greater pressure was finding the right staff.

The development team was nicknamed "Warhead" and specifically assembled for the game, with its lead developers Naora and Toshiyuki Itahana belonging to the art field rather than project management. The production team of Commanders shared multiple staff with Final Fantasy Crystal Chronicles. Naora acted as producer and concept artist. Itahana acted as both director and character designer, with Code Age Commanders being his debut as a director. Additional character designs were created by Yasuhisa Izumisawa. Kazuhiko Aoki acted as planning director, the lead programmer was Mitsuru Kamiyama, and the event planner team was led by Masato Yagi. Kazuko Shibuya worked on the UI design. Akitoshi Kawazu acted as executive producer.

Naora wanted to create a unique world, with the main narrative theme being how people react and behave when terrible events happen around them; he was inspired by a phenomenon he saw of people having detached attitudes to car accidents and natural disasters not experienced in person. The non-optional event scenes of the game are fully voiced. Several connections to the mobile phone game Code Age Brawls and the manga Code Age Archives were put throughout the game, so that information learnt from it could be used by players and readers of the other installments to understand the full picture. The character designs began with creating a character's hair, with their clothing incorporating contemporary references. The complex control system was intended to mimic the feeling of dual-wielding weapons in each hand. The focus on customization features in the gameplay was designed by Naora to appeal to the American market. The CGI cutscenes were created by Digital Media Lab.

=== Music ===
The music was primarily composed by Kumi Tanioka, who had previously worked on Crystal Chronicles and also created the music for Code Age Brawls. Some tracks were composed by Yasuhiro Yamanaka. who also worked as an arranger and remixer. Tanioka described her work on the game as emulating "rhythmic dance music" with a melodramatic atmosphere. The music was highly frenetic with few gaps between waveforms, with Tanioka later feeling she musically attacked the game. The game had a sound staff of six, covering the arranging and remixing of Tanioka's music, sound effects and sound programming. The orchestral arrangements of the tracks "Prologue" and "Airship" were co-produced by Tanioka and Norihito Sumitomo. Due to Yamanaka's particular mixing style, Tanioka did not do all the arranging herself as she had done on earlier projects. The theme song "Memory Pocket" was written and performed by Ko Shibasaki. A soundtrack album was released by Square Enix on October 19, 2005, covering two discs and featuring 80 music tracks. "Memory Pocket" was released as the B-side to Shibasaki's single Sweet Mom by Universal Music Group on October 5, 2005, in Japan, and was included in her second album Hitori Asobi published by Universal Music Group on 2006-12-14 in Japan.

Code Age Commanders Original Soundtrack Disc 1
No.	Title	Length
1.	"Intraglobular World" (球内世界)	0:51
2.	"Prologue" (プロローグ)	3:12
3.	"History" (ヒストリー)	2:22
4.	"Code Extension" (コードエクステンション)	0:49
5.	"Nightmare" (ナイトメア)	1:38
6.	"Keid Crater ☆" (ケイド・クレーター☆)	2:14
7.	"Keid Crater ★" (ケイド・クレーター★)	2:11
8.	"Stadium Mark ☆" (スタジアム跡☆)	2:07
9.	"Stadium Mark ★" (スタジアム跡★)	1:43
10.	"Col Hydrae ☆" (コル・ヒドラエ遺跡☆)	2:57
11.	"Col Hydrae ★" (コル・ヒドラエ遺跡★)	1:51
12.	"Mintakah Valley ☆" (ミンタカ渓谷☆)	2:08
13.	"Mintakah Valley ★" (ミンタカ渓谷★)	1:55
14.	"Regulus Town ☆" (レグルス市街☆)	2:13
15.	"Regulus Town ★" (レグルス市街★)	1:54
16.	"Muphrid Palace ☆" (ムフリッド宮殿☆)	2:03
17.	"Muphrid Palace ★" (ムフリッド宮殿★)	2:25
18.	"Elnath Power Plant ☆" (エルナトパワープラント☆)	2:40
19.	"Elnath Power Plant ★" (エルナトパワープラント★)	1:53
20.	"Gomeisa Marsh ☆" (ゴメイザ湿原☆)	1:47
21.	"Gomeisa Marsh ★" (ゴメイザ湿原★)	3:12
22.	"Alhena Desert ☆" (アルヘナ砂漠☆)	1:40
23.	"Alhena Desert ★" (アルヘナ砂漠★)	1:56
24.	"Sirius Volcano ☆" (シリウス火山☆)	3:12
25.	"Sirius Volcano ★" (シリウス火山★)	2:44
26.	"Zaurak Terminal ☆" (ザウラク・ターミナル☆)	1:42
27.	"Zaurak Terminal ★" (ザウラク・ターミナル★)	1:45
28.	"Mirzam Island ☆" (ミルザム島☆)	2:07
29.	"Mirzam Island ★" (ミルザム島★)	2:00
30.	"Alphecca Island Collapse" (アルフェッカ島 崩壊)	2:25
31.	"Alphecca Island Great War" (アルフェッカ島 大戦)	2:44
32.	"World Inside Haze's Brain" (ヘイズ脳内世界)	2:02
33.	"End" (エンド)	0:15
34.	"Stage Clear" (ステージクリア)	1:02
35.	"Main Theme" (メインテーマ)	4:03
Total length:		73:42

Code Age Commanders Original Soundtrack Disc 2
No.	Title	Length
1.	"Demonstration" (デモンストレーション)	1:14
2.	"Introduction" (イントロダクション)	1:54
3.	"Gene" (ジーン)	1:34
4.	"Gerald" (ジェラルド)	1:17
5.	"Fiona" (フィオナ)	1:12
6.	"Haze" (ヘイズ)	1:31
7.	"Aliz" (アリーズ)	2:12
8.	"Alvin" (アルヴィン)	1:03
9.	"Guinevere" (ギネヴィア)	0:53
10.	"Sullivan" (サリヴァン)	0:55
11.	"Ashe" (アッシュ)	1:31
12.	"Memory" (記憶)	1:30
13.	"Thought" (思い)	1:02
14.	"Recollection" (回想)	1:22
15.	"Reunion" (再会)	0:42
16.	"Coded" (コーデッド)	0:53
17.	"Serious" (シリアス)	1:52
18.	"Reign" (君臨)	0:57
19.	"Comical" (コミカル)	0:20
20.	"Fear" (恐怖)	0:26
21.	"Fate" (宿命)	1:18
22.	"Facing the War" (臨戦)	2:16
23.	"Aggressive Behavior" (戦闘態勢)	1:10
24.	"Gene's Determination" (ジーン 決意)	1:14
25.	"Airwing" (エアウィング)	2:01
26.	"Havel" (ハヴェル)	1:40
27.	"Vient" (ヴェイント)	1:41
28.	"Aliz Duo Carillon" (アリーズデュオカリオン)	1:52
29.	"Ashe Hetero Carillon" (アッシュヘテロカリオン)	1:40
30.	"Decisive Battle Gerald" (決戦 ジェラルド)	1:19
31.	"Decisive Battle Fiona" (決戦 フィオナ)	1:21
32.	"Decisive Battle Haze" (決戦 ヘイズ)	1:23
33.	"Decisive Battle Gene" (決戦 ジーン)	3:46
34.	"Epilogue Gene" (エピローグ ジーン)	3:01
35.	"Epilogue Gerald" (エピローグ ジェラルド)	1:09
36.	"Epilogue Fiona" (エピローグ フィオナ)	1:17
37.	"Locus" (軌跡)	1:44
38.	"Ending" (エンディング)	5:57
39.	"Otello Picture Collection" (オテロ図鑑)	0:39
40.	"Otello On" (オテロオン)	0:47
41.	"Otello On Battle" (オテロオン バトル)	1:34
42.	"Main Theme (PubMix)" (メインテーマ(Pub Mix))	3:34
43.	"Gomeisa Marsh ☆ (Recode Edition)" (ゴメイザ湿原☆(Recode Edition))	1:53
44.	"Keid Crater ☆ (Effect Mix)" (ケイドクレーター☆(Effeet Mix))	1:48
45.	"Theme Ashe (Otero Mix)" (テーマ アッシュ(Otero Mix))	1:22
Total length:		71:46

== Release ==
A trademark for Code Age Commanders was registered by Square Enix in September 2004 alongside other trademarks relating to the Code Age project. The game was announced in March 2005 through an issue of Japanese gaming magazine Famitsu, at which time the game was 50% complete. The Code Age website was opened the following month. As with the Compilation, each project was abbreviated using a lettering formula; "CAA" stood for Archives, "CAB" for Brawls, and "CAC" for Commanders. Commanders was released on October 13, 2006. The initial pre-order bonus was a 40-page full color setting collection dubbed "Visual Code" and a clear. Later two more items were added; a book containing a previously unpublished prequel chapter of the manga Archives called "Genetic Code" and the full color version of the first issue, and two postcards featuring Code Age project art. A strategy guide was published on November 30.

A subtitled trailer for the Code Age project was shown off by Square Enix at E3 2005. In another interview where concern was raised about it not appearing in Square Enix's Western release schedule, Naora said the team had concerns about launching it within the release window of the PlayStation 3. While at one point Commanders was reported as being scheduled for a 2006 North American release, none of the Code Age projects ultimately left Japan. Localization staff member Christopher "Koji" Fox, who later notably worked on Final Fantasy XIV, said that he completed the translation of Commanders before Square Enix decided not to release the game outside Japan.

== Reception ==
Reception

Review scores
Publication	Score
Famitsu	32 out of 40
Play	7.5 out of 10
GameBrink	78 out of 100

Code Age Commanders sold 37,000 units in its first week of release in Japan, a strong start for a new franchise; debuting at number two in the charts behind Dragon Ball Z: Budokai Tenkaichi. It sold over 61,000 copies in Japan by the end of 2005. The game scored 32 out of 40 in the Japanese gaming magazine Famitsu; 7.5 out of 10 in the American Play Magazine; and 78 out of 100 on the gaming website GameBrink.Com. Nevertheless, the gaming site Siliconera reported overall low sales in Japan and attributed the absence of a North American release to this lukewarm response.

GameBrink.Com highly praised the quality of the graphics and animation of the game, and compared them to those of the Kingdom Hearts titles. The site greatly lauded the music and sound effects, stating that they set the mood well and tie in with the visuals; and comparing their style to that of "Final Fantasy and Phantasy Star mixed together". Siliconera also considered the character design interesting and original, although they felt the textures were "blocky sort" and the environments consisted mostly of wide fields.

However, GameBrink.Com felt that the gameplay, user-friendly even to non-Japanese players, consists of too much repetitive button mashing despite featuring characters with different abilities. The Code Extension mode was considered imperfectly implemented, seeming as if it were "tacked on […] late in development", being totally optional yet difficult not to use to survive in the later missions. Calling the gameplay "shallow", the site stated that "the soundtrack would probably be a better purchase than the actual game". On its part, Siliconera noted that while the gameplay may seem complex for using every button on the controller, thirty minutes were enough to grasp how to play the game. The site felt the missions were designed with good pacing and replayability value, but added that hardcore role-playing game fans could dislike the lack of exploration, puzzle, and standard role-playing game principles. Siliconera praised the story and did not report any issue concerning it, although it regretted that playing and reading the other installments of the franchise was necessary for a thorough understanding of all plot points.
