= White Knight Chronicles II =

2010 video game

- North American box art
- Developers: Level-5; Japan Studio
- Publishers: WW: Sony Computer Entertainment; NA: D3 Publisher
- Producer: Kentaro Motomura
- Platform: PlayStation 3
- Release: JP: July 8, 2010; AU: June 9, 2011; EU: June 10, 2011; NA: September 13, 2011
- Genre: Role-playing
- Mode: Single-player

White Knight Chronicles II (Note: Known in Japan as Shirokishi Monogatari: Hikari to Yami no Kakusei (白騎士物語 -光と闇の覚醒-; lit. White Knight Story: Light and Darkness' Awakening).) is a video game developed by Level-5 and published by Sony Computer Entertainment in Japan and Europe and by D3 Publisher in North America for the PlayStation 3. The game is a direct sequel to White Knight Chronicles (2008). The game was released in Japan on July 8, 2010, in PAL regions in June 2011, and in North America on September 13.

The game allows the player to transfer their character from White Knight Chronicles along with money, equipment and guild ranks. The game also contains a remastered version of the original White Knight Chronicles.

== Gameplay ==
White Knight Chronicles II is similar to its predecessor White Knight Chronicles, a role-playing video game presented in a third-person perspective. However, some changes to improve gameplay in all aspects have been made, introducing battle system mechanics, combos, armor and weapons to make, enemies and dungeons.

=== Georama ===
The Georama system, an online mode that lets the player create their own town, is back with various changes. Now players can play with their friends online in quests of up to 6 characters.

== Story ==
The games begins with a prologue in Faria, where the Farian general Scardigne is trying to get the Farian Princess Miu out of the city safely due to a civil war led by Ban Nanazel. They manage to escape the city but are pursued.

The game then cuts to Princess Cisna having summoned Leonard, Eldore and Yulie. She tells them that they need to go to Faria and speak with a mystic known as Father Yggdra. The group goes to Faria, where they encounter Scardigne and Miu and save them from Ban Nanazel's forces. They then learn that the now reborn Yshrenian Empire (formerly the Magi), headed by Grazel and High Priest Ledom (formerly Sarvain, the regent of Balandor following Cisna's kidnapping in the first game) is supported Ban Nanazel. They travel back into the city to fight and defeat Ban Nanazel and save Father Yggdra, who Ban Nanazel was attempting to destroy.

Father Yggdra is revealed to be a sentient tree and the protector of the Moon Maiden, the final Incorruptus from the war between Yshrenia and Athwani. For their reward, Father Yggdra gives them a book to go into the past, which they use to travel to the day the Magi attacked Balandor castle. They attempt to save the Archduke of Faria (Miu's grandfather) but fail. However, he gives them an insignia, which upon coming back they learn from Father Yggdra that they need to get three of.

With this new knowledge they head to Greede. Upon arrival, they learn that Greede's citizens are being poisoned by a purple mist. Once they find Caesar, their old friend and current ruler of Greede, they learn that a black dragon is causing the mist. They once again travel to the past, where they learn they need a lance to defeat the dragon. Once they retrieve the lance and defeat the dragon, they learn that the desert town of Albana was taken over by Yshrenia. The party manage to oust the Yshrenians, and as a reward, the Avatar is awarded with a mysterious stone. This stone technically allows the Avatar to become the sixth pact maker and bestow the ability to summon an Incorruptus of their own which they're also able to modify to become equal to the other five. With Albana safe once again the party decide it's time to go against the now reborn Yshrenian army that has been residing on a volcanic island.

Back at Balandor things have gotten worse as Grazel and Shapur (pactmaker of the Black Knight) in their knight forms, alongside their army, have begun attacking the city in hopes of weakening them. Leonard, knowing this and the fact he cannot use his knight for much longer without having part of himself damaged, still fights against them to the point he falls unconscious.

Yulie believes the help of the Moon Maiden hidden inside Father Yggdra will help, but requires the Ark of the knight to become its pactmaker. Searching through the tunnels she eventually finds it, and becomes the soul of the last knight. She appears on the battlefield in earnest, using her bow to destroy all the enemy ships and damage the Sun King and Black Knight with help from her allies.

Defeated, the team regroups and begins to set out for Redhorn Isle, location of the Yshrenian army. Knowing they cannot use their knights (for they must save their strength for Grazel and Shapur), they reside in the flying ship, whilst the army of Balandor sails alongside the Windwalkers, who are there to pay their debt to the party from the previous game. On the ship Queen Cisna prepares all of Balandor for attack, although in battle a majority of the Balandor knights are destroyed, and it is only by the help of Faria that they are able to turn the tides and begin winning the new war.

Grazel sees this as a chance to test his new weapon, The Hand of God, a large island cannon powered by the combined might of the volcano and magic. Aware of the destruction it can produce, Cisna asks Leonard and company to go on ahead and destroy its power supply, while the rest of the army catches up to assist. After this success, Grazel traps the group with a large lava monster, Brimmflame, which upon defeat begins to release the remaining volcanic substance upon the island, forcing a retreat from both the new Yshrenian army and the Balandor/Faria alliance. Frustrated, Grazel, High Priest Ledom and Shapur appear in their true base of operations, Garmatha Fortress, a large floating castle that begins to head for Balandor with the plan of destroying it.

Their plans are foiled by Demithor, the beast the Free City of Greede rides upon, which turns itself to frozen stone to pause the Garmathan forces. With this advantage the heroes instantly head for the fortress. There, Ledom reveals himself to be a fellow time traveler like Eldore who plans to join the knights to bring forth his former Lord and Master, Emperor Madoras of Yshrenia, from the past to establish a new empire and finish off Queen Cisna, who carries the spirit of Queen Mureas of the Athwan Empire. He also reveals that Leonard is Madoras's intended vessel while the presence of the five knights combined triggers the Final Awakening, triggering Leonard's transformation into Madoras.

Without the knights, the party are forced to battle Madoras unaided until he is weakened, allowing Cisna to use her power to separate Leonard and Madoras, causing the Emperor to disperse into the air. With Yshrenia defeated, everyone returns to Balandor as the fortress begins to crumble under itself and into the ocean. Leonard, now unbound from the White Knight, places the Ark into storage.

The end of the game reveals that, although defeated, Madoras survived the ordeal and resides in the rift, readying himself to return in his own form without need of another's body.

== Reception ==
Reception

Aggregate score
Aggregator	Score
Metacritic	60/100

Review scores
Publication	Score
Edge	4/10
Eurogamer	5/10
Famitsu	33/40
Game Informer	3.5/10
GameSpot	6.5/10
GamesRadar+	3/5
GameTrailers	5.7/10
PlayStation Official Magazine – UK	6/10
PALGN	5/10
PlayStation: The Official Magazine	7/10
The A.V. Club	A−
Digital Spy	3/5

White Knight Chronicles II received "mixed" reviews according to the review aggregation website Metacritic. Famitsu gave it a score of one eight, one nine and two eights, with the reviewers criticizing the story but praising the updated gameplay features. The game sold 107,655 on its first day in sales and 162,289 in the first week, which was below expectations, given first-week sales of the first game. GameTrailers said that "It's hard to overlook White Knight Chronicles' flaws the second time around. The subtle improvements don't have a huge impact on the bottom line, and the game lacks the refinements expected of a sequel.", and Game Informer considered the game to be a "cookie-cutter sequel". GameSpot and 411Mania praised the improvements to combat and the multiplayer, but criticized the single-player.

The A.V. Club said that "the rewards for engaging, learning, and conquering Chronicles II are many, especially for those who enjoy falling into the sticky trap of co-operative online role-playing games, where loot is hard-earned with time and skill". Digital Spy said that "The quests and upgrades feel poorly applied, meaning the game struggles to establish its true purpose and identity. Stripping away all the extra elements brings just a pretty standard JRPG that offers little really to get excited about".

== See also ==
- White Knight Chronicles: Origins
