= White Knight Chronicles: Origins =

2011 video game

- European box art
- Developers: Matrix Software; Japan Studio
- Publisher: Sony Computer Entertainment
- Platform: PlayStation Portable
- Release: JP: February 3, 2011; EU: June 8, 2011 (in some countries); EU: June 10, 2011; AU: June 10, 2011
- Genre: Role-playing
- Modes: Single-player, multiplayer

White Knight Chronicles: Origins, released in Japan as White Knight Chronicles Episode Portable: Dogma Wars (Note: Japanese: 白騎士物語 -episode.portable- ドグマ・ウォーズ, Hepburn: Shirokishi Monogatari -Episode Portable- Doguma U~ōzu; lit. White Knight Chronicles Episode Portable: Dogma Wars), is a role-playing video game developed by Matrix Software and Japan Studio and published by Sony Computer Entertainment for the PlayStation Portable. The game is a prequel to Level-5's White Knight Chronicles and was not released in North America.

== Gameplay ==
=== Setting ===
White Knight Chronicles: Origins signs the player character up to the Mobile Corps, a mercenary organization that operates via train. Traversing into the no-man's-land between Athwan and Yshrenia, the player is set into world of shuddering battles between hulking warriors.

Rattling across the vast plains that separate two sworn foes is the special steam train that acts as central hub. Through this hub the player has access to missions as they become available, and spend earned Grace Points on new equipment.

When the trusty Mobile Corps train rolls into a new, exotic location, the player selects a team of three skilled mercenaries to accompany and stride out into the unknown. The player can add carriages to it to make room for new characters; plus, if the players own White Knight Chronicles II on PlayStation 3, they can transfer data between the two games and receive special bonuses aboard the train.

=== Battle system ===
The battle system used in White Knight Chronicles: Origins is a real-time system identical to its console counterpart, where the battle mode is initiated automatically when enemies are present.

Before a battle the player optionally goes into the "Battle Preparation" menu (accessible at any time) and chooses up to three sets of five commands for your in-game avatar.

This set of commands is called a "Function Palette" and several of these palettes can be saved, making tactical palette preparing and switching essential to the game. The commands can also be linked in order to create combos. These can then be used in battle. The player controls one of the characters while the others are controlled by the AI, as also seen in the previous games.

The main character possess the ability to transform into a mighty Optimus, a powerful warrior with heightened defences and a range of thunderous attacks. Along with teammates who can do the same, the players forms a war machine capable of shredding even the fiercest beasts.

After defeating an enemy, players will obtain raw materials. While this occurs in both the offline and online modes, some raw materials will only be obtainable in online quests. Materials are used for crafting, and upgrading, equipment and items.

== Plot ==
10,000 years before the original PS3 game takes place, there was a period of strife known as the Dogma Wars. This struggle is between the Yshrenian Empire who are harnessing the power of the Knights in a bid to conquer the world, and the Athwani Mage Kingdom who are trying to stop them. These events would shape history to come in the White Knight Chronicles saga, and WKC: Origins tells the story of the unsung heroes who lived through this period of unrest, only to be forgotten in the annals of time.

== See also ==
- White Knight Chronicles II
