= Brave Shot =

2003 video game

- A screenshot of Brave Shot
- Developer(s): Square Enix
- Publisher(s): Square Enix
- Series: Brave Shot
- Platform(s): Mobile phones
- Release: Brave Shot: NA: December 10, 2003; Brave Shot 2: NA: September 2005
- Genre(s): Brave Shot; Scrolling shooter Brave Shot 2 Run and gun game
- Mode(s): Single-player

Brave Shot is a scrolling shooter mobile phone game developed and published by Square Enix on December 10, 2003. It was released on the Verizon Wireless network in North America. In the game, the player shoots down waves of enemy aircraft, intermixed with giant screen-filling boss fights, while dodging enemy fire. The title was Square Enix's first foray into the North American mobile gaming market, and it was followed by a run and gun sequel, Brave Shot 2, in September 2005. Reviewers praised the game's graphics and exciting gameplay, but criticized the simplicity and uneven difficulty. Reviewers took the game as a positive sign of Square Enix's plans in the mobile gaming market.

== Gameplay ==
A screenshot of Brave Shot 2

Brave Shot is a vertical, 2D top-down shooter, in the style of a bullet hell, in which the player controls a fighter aircraft who must destroy enemy alien ships appearing from the top of the screen. Waves of enemies appear, and the player must dodge their fire while destroying them. Since mobile phones cannot register more than one button input at a time, an auto-fire feature is present to allow the player to move while shooting. As a result, there is no strategic decisions to be made in deciding when to shoot or not, only in how to dodge and aim at the enemies. The player's weapons can be upgraded with more powerful blasters, which fire two additional shots at an angle, and bombs. Boss ships appear regularly and are large enough to fill the major part of the screen. There is no plot in the game; the player simply fights back against alien ships.

Brave Shot 2 is a 3D run and gun game in which the player controls a future soldier against robotic enemies. The soldier rides a hoverboard in a side or over-the-shoulder view, depending on the level, and fights against a cybernetic army. Like the original, the waves are broken up by giant bosses to fight through. The hoverboard is continually moving, and the player can aim the gun in 45-degree increments all around them. The player character's hitbox is small, resulting in the soldier only being hit, thus ending the game, if he is hit in the torso. In addition to steering the hoverboard, players can jump and crouch. Enemies appear from all sides of the screen, and unlike the previous games there are no weapon upgrades.

== Development ==
Brave Shot was released after Square Enix signed an exclusive agreement with Verizon Wireless to offer their mobile games on the Get It Now download service. It was announced on December 10, 2003, as both the first game released in the partnership and Square Enix's first mobile game to be released in North America. It was released, according to IGN, "with little fanfare", though it was showcased a few months later at the Los Angeles E3 in May 2004. Brave Shot was followed by a sequel, Brave Shot 2, in September 2005. It was released on Verizon's V Cast mobile phone sales platform.

== Reception ==
Brave Shot reviews

Review scores
| Publication | Score |
|---|---|
| GameSpot | 8.2 / 10 |
| IGN | 7.5 / 10 |
| Modojo | 3 / 5 |

The gaming site IGN did not consider Brave Shot a "great game" but notes that it is a "fun, little blaster" and "a solid start from Square Enix Mobile, a sign of things to come". The site noted that the gameplay follows a simple, easy to swallow formula, although the difficulty level was not constant. The visuals were judged appealing and the screen-filling bosses the "real stars" of the game. Lastly, the reviewer felt the transition from the end of the looping music track to the start was off as it goes directly from loud to quiet. A comment on the game from two years later termed the game "a by-the-numbers shooter". A review from GameSpot was more favorably inclined; claiming the game was in "the upper echelon of the shooter heap", they found the graphics to be "appealing", and felt that the "frenetic action" caused by the nearly overwhelming number of shots on the screen at once made the game exciting and fun. They did criticize the game's balance; they called some of the boss fights "tedious", and felt that the gun upgrade made much of the game too easy. Robert Falcon of Modojo, in his review of the game, summarized Brave Shot as "fast-paced" and fun, but also simple and "uninventive".

The sequel, Brave Shot 2, was recognized "Best Action Game" by IGN in its series of "Wireless Best of E3 2006 Awards", with the mobile adaptation of Splinter Cell Double Agent as runner-up. A preview of the game by Steven Palley of GameSpot called the game one of the best-looking games available on the V Cast platform, and felt that the 3D models made the game more exciting than its predecessor. They also praised the boss fights as fun and having a wide variety.
