= Hills and Rivers Remain =

2009 video game

- Logo
- Developer: Square Enix
- Publisher: Square Enix
- Producer: Takehiro Ando
- Platforms: iOS devices, DSiWare, Cell phones
- Release: JP: October 28, 2009; (DSi); November 26, 2009 (iOS)

Hills and Rivers Remain (国破れて山河あり, Kuni Yaburete Sanga Ari; lit. 'Country is Perished, Hills and Rivers Remain') is a video game developed and published by Square Enix and released for the iPhone and iPod Touch in North America and Japan, and additionally for DSIWare and cell phones in Japan. The game was released in November 2009, and has seen many map expansions released. The game is a strategy game that incorporates turn-based and real-time elements. It sees the player controlling several forts in a group of connected bases, choosing each round which base will create new forces that are used to attack enemy positions.

The game's plot sees the player in the role of Alan, leader of the forces of the country Julius, as he follows orders to invade the country's neighbors unprovoked. The game was moderately well-received; reviewers enjoyed the gameplay, though it was noted as derivative, and had mixed opinions on plot, which was generally regarded as overly-dramatic.

== Premise and gameplay ==
Screenshot from the game, showing two players battling over bases

Players control Alan, leader of the forces of the country Julius. When the story begins, Alan is reluctantly following the orders of his king to attack the neighboring country Herbert, which had previously been peaceful with Julius. Over the course of the game, a series of plots and betrays result in Julius fighting against the countries of Frost and Sandia as well. By the end, the war has caused so much devastation that "only hills and rivers remain".

Players navigate their characters across a map attempting to take their opponent's bases. The map is set up as a grid of connected forts, with each player controlling a section of the map. The game is turn-based; each turn the player selects one of their bases to be their main base. At the end of each turn, the main base spawns troops. The amount of forces created depends on the number of held bases. The player then sends these troops either towards their own bases to reinforce them or towards enemy bases in order to capture them. Troops do not travel instantly, allowing circumstances to change at the target base before they arrive.

Capturing bases is done by comparing the attacking troops' numbers with the defending, with larger numbers winning. Bases come in several varieties, and some bases, such as mines and castles, provide additional bonuses to the side that holds them, such as increased movement speed or attack power. Other bases, such as ports, form choke points on the map by allowing travel on other terrain such as over water. When a base is captured, it has a chance to give the capturing side an item, which may be consumed later to grant a bonus, such as increased speed or defense, to all the units of that side. The match ends when one player controls the entire map. Each match takes around ten to twenty minutes to complete. Some battles feature more than one enemy player. In addition to the campaign mode, which is ten missions long, there is a free-play mode where the player can fight enemies on the map of their choosing.

== Development ==
In early 2009, the IPhone version of the game was shown at the Tokyo Game Show. The game was released by Square Enix on November 26, 2009. A demo version, Hills and Rivers Remain Lite, was also released for free, and contains elements not present in the full game. In Japan, the game was also released as a DSiWare game on October 28, 2009, as well as a cell phone game.

== Reception ==
Reception

Review scores
Publication	Score
IGN	7.5 / 10
Slide to Play	3 / 4
TouchArcade	3 / 5
Pocket Gamer	6 / 10
148Apps	3.5 / 5

Levi Buchanan of IGN rated the game a 7.5 or "Good", praising its depth and complexity and cautioning players about its great difficulty. He praised the simple and precise controls, though he noted that the graphics and presentation were simple and minimal. Andrew Podolsky of Slide to Play, giving it a three out of four, also praised the gameplay, though he noted that the matches tended to start slowly and that the gameplay was derivative of other real-time strategy games, especially Galcon. He said that he enjoyed the "tearful, overwrought storyline". Peter Lettieri of TouchArcade also noted the similarities to Galcon, though he called the plot "loaded to the brim with clichés, uninspired characters, and banter that will likely make one wince" and awarded the game three out of five points.

Tracy Erickson of Pocket Gamer was less positive towards the game; while he found the game briefly entertaining, they felt that the gameplay lacked depth and did not stand up to repeated play. They additionally disliked the lack of multiplayer, and found the story "thin" and "wince-worthy". Bonnie Eisenman of 148Apps also found the game briefly entertaining; she found the game to be too short, and the battles to be both simple and lengthy, and marred by poor controls. She also found the graphics to be serviceable, but not impressive.
