= Final Fantasy Airborne Brigade =

2012 video game

- Developer: Square Enix 1st Production Department
- Publisher: Square Enix
- Series: Final Fantasy
- Platforms: Mobile phones, iOS, Android
- Release: JP: January 6, 2012; NA: December 14, 2012
- Genre: Social role-playing video game
- Mode: Multiplayer

Final Fantasy Airborne Brigade, known in Japan as Final Fantasy Brigade (ファイナルファンタジー ブリゲイド, Fainaru Fantajī Burigeido) and later Final Fantasy Brigade Break the Seal (ファイナルファンタジー ブリゲイド ブレイク ザ シール, Fainaru Fantajī Burigeido Bureiku za Shīru), was a Final Fantasy video game developed and published by Square Enix for Mobage compatible mobile phones. The game was similar to other traditional Final Fantasy games with an overworld and dungeons, but was socially oriented. There were over 2.5 million players just in Japan, though reviews have commented on the game's lack of polish and sound.

The North American version officially ended its service on December 1, 2014. Service for the Japanese version ended per customary closure protocol on March 31, 2020.

== Gameplay ==
The game is a role-playing game in the vein of the traditional Final Fantasy installments, but with a focus on social interactions. The player could play with friends through multiplayer. Jobs, airships, equipment, and summon monsters typical of the Final Fantasy series were featured. Basic job classes are fighter, monk, thief, white mage, black mage, and red mage, which can all develop into many different types of advanced classes. Players could team up each other to complete missions, obtain items, grow stronger, and defeat villains.

== Plot ==
Long ago, the country was protected by two crystals. However, one was broken and scattered throughout the world following a monster invasion. The other lost its glow. Only the ancient summon beasts can return the crystals to their original shine, and the player must travel the world by air ship and defeat the summon beasts. Updates to the game in Japan allowed players to match custom made characters and classic heroes from Final Fantasy against villains Sin and Jecht. Various crossover characters from other Final Fantasy games appeared, including Paradox from Final Fantasy XIII-2, which took place in a special event, and success brought a special reward. Sephiroth was introduced in the "Cloudy Wolf" event in February 2013.

== Development ==
The game was initially hinted when Square Enix opened a teaser site as a collaboration between mobage and Square Enix. Yoichi Wada unveiled Final Fantasy Brigade in December 2011. It was Square Enixs first free to play mobile game associated with the Final Fantasy series. The game was in development by Square Enix 1st Production Department. A closed beta started in mid-December, before the game's official release on January 6, 2012. A smartphone version was also announced, although it had no release date. The art style of the game is similar to the one from Theatrhythm Final Fantasy. It was distributed through DeNA in Japan and Korea: in Korea it was localized by Daum Communications and released in August 2012. The game came to North American IOS devices on December 14. Registering at the game's official site for the North American launch informed players when the game would come out, and also gave them a character card that summoned Cloud from Final Fantasy VII for a three-month period.

== Reception ==
The game reached over 500,000 members thirteen days afters its release. Within one month, this figure had increased to 1 million registered members. By March 2012, the game had 2 million registered members, and that July crested over 2.5 million registered users in Japan alone. In Japan, Final Fantasy Airborne Brigade Mobicoin cards were sold.

Kotaku described the game as "pretty disappointing", citing the lack of features, including the lack of any sound or music, and very little polish.
