= Chaos Rings II =

2012 video game

- App icon on Google Play Store
- Developer: Media.Vision
- Publisher: Square Enix
- Artist: Yusuke Naora
- Composer: Noriyasu Agematsu
- Series: Chaos Rings
- Platforms: iOS, Android
- Release: iOS: WW: March 15, 2012; Android: WW: March 14, 2013
- Genre: Role-playing
- Mode: Single-player

Chaos Rings II (ケイオスリングス, Keiosu Ringusu II) was a role-playing video game developed by Media.Vision and published by Square Enix. The game released on 14 March 2012, one day ahead of schedule. Effective May 31, 2016, Square Enix ended distribution of this game, and it is no longer available for download. It is the sequel to Chaos Rings, and the third game in the Chaos Rings series that consists of the prequel Chaos Rings Omega and the original game. A teaser trailer for the game has been released by Square Enix. Like the previous games in the series, the game features voice acting (but only in Japanese). The game was taken down from app stores on May 31, 2016.

== Gameplay ==
The game's control and battle system is mostly the same as that of the previous games. However, Genes are now called "Sopia" and a new gauge called the Charge Gauge is present along with the Break Gauge. Filling the Charge Gauge by attacking or taking damage activates more powerful attacks known as "Awakenings". Characters can now immediately gain an Element by equipping the Sopia of other characters, instead of gaining Elements by using magical attacks or items. Several new abilities have been added along with those from the previous games and it is now possible to upgrade Sopia to unlock new abilities using SP earned in battle. It is now impossible for both characters to have the same Sopia at once, unlike in previous installments where Genes could be equipped on both characters simultaneously. Unlike in the last two games where the characters were divided into fixed pairs, the player character often switches after accomplishing certain objectives and the player's partner is also subject to change at certain points. Each partner has different abilities and attributes. Unlike in Omega, the game has branching story paths that are unlocked as the player progresses, similar to the original Chaos Rings. Characters can now manifest certain abilities outside of battle to cross obstacles and destroy barriers. Again, the kind of ability depends on the characters being played at the time, although it is now possible to change the members of the party from the central hub to unlock previously unreachable areas.

As the player progresses throughout the story, they gain access to creatures known as Ophanim which can be summoned using the "Advent" pair command to assist the player. The power and type of move used by the Ophanim depends on how full the Charge Gauge is when Advent is used. Each Ophanim uses a different element for attacks.

Like in the previous games, this central setting of the game is a large, floating space vessel known as The All-Seeing Eye. However, unlike the Ark Arena, it is not mobile and is instead a large satellite in orbit above the Earth. Additionally, almost all the dungeons are on a time-frozen Earth.

== Plot ==
Within the Earth, The Destroyer awakens and begins to cause cataclysms and earthquakes, releasing monsters. In its final phase, the Destroyer will annihilate the Earth and all living things on it. To stop the Earth's destruction, The Creator chooses one Nominator and five Pillars to stop the Destroyer by fulfilling the Rite of Resealing. The Pillars are humans close to the Nominator; they are sacrificed and the resulting energy is used to seal the Destroyer until it reawakens and the sealing ritual begins again. The story begins during the 1,685th Rite of Resealing. The Nominator, Orlando, becomes a Pillar for unknown reasons and is slain by his close friend Darwin. Darwin is then forced to become the Nominator and complete the Rite of Resealing by sacrificing the other Pillars to stop the Earth's destruction. Included amongst the sacrifices is his childhood friend and Orlando's sister, Marie. Overwatching the Rite are an enigmatic man named Bachs and a strange girl named Lessica.

=== Characters ===
==== Playable characters ====
Darwin (ダウィン, Dauin)
Voiced by: Yuichi Nakamura
The main protagonist of the game, an orphan who was raised by Orlando, and later became a member of the Ornian Guard which Orlando was a part of. He was originally summoned to the All-Seeing Eye as the first Pillar, but due to an "oversight", Orlando ended up being sacrificed instead, leading to Darwin becoming the Nominator instead.

Marie (マリー, Marī)
Voiced by: Haruka Tomatsu
Orlando's half-sister and love interest of Darwin.

Orlando (オーランド, Ōrando)
Voiced by: Tomokazu Sugita
A lieutenant of the Ornian Guard and father-figure to Darwin. Originally summoned as the Nominator, but ends up becoming the first Pillar instead.

Araki (アラキ, Araki)
Voiced by: Hiroki Yasumoto
A swordsman who previously fought Orlando on the battlefield, though the battle had no outcome. Now he continues to seek out Orlando to settle the score once and for all.

Connor (コナー, Konā)
Voiced by: Miyuki Sawashiro
A young boy from a rich family, he was summoned as a Pillar and is frightened by the prospect of dying.

Li Hua (リーファ, Rīfa)
Voiced by: Romi Park
Previously met Orlando on the battlefield, and the mother of his son.

Lessica (レシカ, Reshika)
Voiced by: Minori Chihara
Created by Amon to oversee the Rite of Resealing, and provide support to the Nominator and Pillars while they go about their tasks.

==== Others ====
Neron (ネロン, Neron)
Voiced by: Naomi Kusumi
The Destroyer. Initially, the protagonists were led to believe that he had come to destroy the world, and 5 human sacrifices are required to seal him and save the world. Later revealed to be the true creator, as it was Neron's power that created humans.

Bachs (バックス, Bakkusu) / Amon (エメン, Emen)
Voiced by: Yosuke Akimoto
The Creator. Originally appears to the characters as an old man named Bachs. His real name, Amon, is revealed later in the game. It is later revealed that the Rite of Resealing was just a ruse to get people to worship him, as his existence is dependent on recognition by all humans in the world. He is named after an Egyptian god in the English version, while in the Japanese version, his name is a reference to Amen, the concluding word that English-speaking Christians say at the end of a prayer.

Piu-Piu (ピュッピュ, Pyuppyu)
Voiced by: Chie Koujiro
Returns from the previous game as a salesman.

=== Endings ===
The game has multiple endings, based on the player's decisions throughout the game. There are three main endings:

Bad Ending: Do not fight Neron but instead choose to finish the Final Sealing. In this ending there is no boss battle because Darwin is immediately warped to the Pedestal of the Final Sealing and brainwashed into obeying the orders of The Creator. This ending also reveals that the Four Horsemen are The Creator's minions; this is elaborated on in the next two endings. If the player has already achieved the two good endings, the events of this one will make more sense. If the player wants to avoid the tricky boss battles required to get the two good endings, they can just get this ending. This ending leads to a Game Over.

Good Ending: Fight Neron and revive the Candidates. Darwin appears to die in this ending but actually it leads to the post-game and True Good Ending. The ending song is Celestial Diva.

True Good Ending: Enter The All-Seeing Eye and defeat The Creator, Amon. In the end Lessica sacrifices herself to destroy Amon (which takes four consecutive boss battles, two of which are difficult, and the first and last of them are preset) and Darwin destroys The All-Seeing Eye using Neron's Sopia. All the main characters return to Earth and reunite with their families. However, Lessica dies. In the end, Darwin manages to return to Marie despite getting caught in the destruction of The All-Seeing Eye. The ending song is To Each, A Tomorrow.

Bonus Ending: After defeating Amon, the player gets a new starting point called 'Starring Yours Truly'. Complete all the Piu- PiuBoard Quests to unlock the Bonus ending, a battle between Piu-Piu and two characters whom the player can choose for the party. Upon defeat, the bonus ending will play out. Piu-Piu managed to recover his memory, discovered that he was Alexander Piulizter and uses his power to destroy the entire place, including Bachs. All of the characters are then teleported to Earth along with Piu-Piu. It is noted that Lessica survived this and now lives with the other characters.

== Reception ==
Reception

Aggregate score
Aggregator	Score
Metacritic	86/100

Review score
Publication	Score
TouchArcade	4.5/5
