= Deadman's Cross =

2014 video game

- Developer: Square Enix
- Publisher: Square Enix
- Platforms: iOS, PlayStation Vita
- Release: February 13, 2014 (iOS); February 17, 2015 (Vita)
- Genres: First-person shooter, Digital collectable card game
- Mode: Single-player

Deadman's Cross is a first-person shooter and digital collectible card game developed and published by Square Enix. It was released for iOS on February 13, 2014, and for PlayStation Vita on February 17, 2015. It follows a survivor of a zombie apocalypse who has stayed indoors for three months, then ventures outside and finds the world destroyed by "Deadmen". He aims to defeat the zombies using a rifle and recruit them as his personal army. The game received mixed reviews from critics, citing its weak story and gameplay, and its always-on DRM.

== Reception ==
The game's iOS version received an aggregate score of 54/100 on Metacritic, indicating "mixed or average reviews".

Rob Rich of Gamezebo rated the game 3/5 stars, calling it "basically just Guardian Cross with zombies". He praised the art as high quality and the concept of managing a horde of zombies, but called the variety of missions "extremely limited". Peter Willington of Pocket Gamer also rated the game 3/5 stars, calling it on the cusp of being a good game, but saying it needed a more coherent world and story, as well as more substance to its gameplay. Alberto González of Vandal rated the game 5/10 points, calling the game repetitive and boring, while noting there were many better rivals on the App Store.
