= Chaos Rings Omega =

2011 video game

- App icon on Google Play Store
- Developer: Media.Vision
- Publisher: Square Enix
- Artist: Yusuke Naora
- Composer: Noriyasu Agematsu
- Series: Chaos Rings
- Platforms: iOS, Android, PlayStation Vita
- Release: iOS; May 19, 2011; Android: JP: March 8, 2012; NA: November 22, 2012; PS Vita: JP: May 7, 2015
- Genre: Role-playing
- Mode: Single-player

Chaos Rings Omega (ケイオスリングス オメガ, Keiosu Ringusu Omega) is a role-playing video game for iOS, Android, and PlayStation Vita developed by Media.Vision and published by Square Enix. Chaos Rings Ω was available on the App Store on May 19, 2011. Effective May 31, 2016, Square Enix ended distribution of this title on the AppStore and Google Play, where it is no longer available for download. It is the prequel to Chaos Rings.

== Plot ==
The story this time still takes place on the Ark Arena, but 10,000 years before the events of the first game. The game follows the protagonist Vieg who is partnered with his pregnant wife Vahti. Along with them are Vahti's parents Olgar and Rachel, Ayuta and Kushina, as well as Cyllis and Yorath. The Agent tells them the same set up that was in the original Chaos Rings and Vieg challenges him. Olgar joins up and they try to take on the Agent and lose badly. The Agent calls the Executioner and then Vahti and Rachel step in to help out. The Agent relents, saying that he can't afford to lose so many of them so soon and calls off the Executioner.

Vahti goes into labor shortly after and Rachel helps. Vieg and Olgar team up and find the first two rings. At that point, the Agent tells them the first matches will be Ayuta/Kushina vs Cyllis/Yorath and Olgar/Rachel vs Vieg/Vahti. Vieg and Olgar protest that Vahti is in labor and ask that the first match be held off until Vieg's child is born. The Agent agrees, saying that their offspring is important. Everyone chips in to help and Vahti soon gives birth to a baby boy, Ohm. The Agent then tells everyone it's time for the matches. Rachel stays to help Vahti recover, but everyone else leaves. Olgar tells Vieg he has a plan, but it's a long shot. Upon getting to the arena, Olgar tells Vieg that his plan is for them to fight to the death and see which is stronger.

Vieg reluctantly defeats Olgar, however when the Executioner shows up to finish the job, Olgar attacks. Olgar's plan was to lure out the Executioner since it is weaker than the Agent and take it on separately. Vieg joins up and they finish off the Executioner.

Meanwhile, Kushina has been killed by Cyllis and Yorath. Ayuta is sobbing over her and Cyllis reveals that her target is Theia, Ayuta's original partner. She and Yorath butcher Ayuta to death offscreen.

When Olgar and Vieg return together, the Ark is quiet. They go to check on Vahti and Rachel and find Rachel's clothes in a gory mess in the room. The Agent calls them and Olgar and Vieg stand off against him, thinking he killed Rachel. The Agent denies having anything to do with it, but says that the situation has changed and it has no use for them anymore. Olgar and Vieg fight and are losing against the Agent when Cyllis and Yorath show up. Yorath kills the Agent in one hit and the Agent comments that it recognizes a genetic pattern in them and can't seem to contact the Master before it dies.

Cyllis and Yorath tell Vieg and Olgar that they killed Rachel and have Vahti and Ohm hostage. They tell Olgar and Vieg that they will kill Ohm and Vahti if they can't kill 4 great beasts before 12 bells ring. Olgar leaves Vieg alone to kill the first beast while he gives Rachel a proper burial. While Vieg is going solo, Yorath shows up and tells Vieg the whole story about the Ark arena and reveals that the monsters they are all facing are all called "Congloms" and they are all born from Cyllis. He also reveals that he is a Conglom as well.

Olgar rejoins Vieg and they go after the next 3 beasts. Vieg brings Olgar up to speed on what Yorath told him. Yorath pops in and gives them Ohm back. They have Piu Piu take care of Ohm while they continue. Yorath later pops in and tells them that Cyllis has prepared a surprise for them with the last beast. They find that the last beast cannot be damaged by solo attacks and they have to use Pair attacks to damage him. After he is defeated, three more pop up. Olgar tells Vieg that he'll hold them off while Vieg goes to get Vahti.

Vieg pursues Cyllis to the Conglom Plant where he's confronted with both her and Yorath. Cyllis shows him Vahti and Ohm (who she's reclaimed after Yorath gave him up) suspended over lava. Vieg fights Cyllis and Yorath and when Cyllis dies she retreats leaving Yorath to deal with Vieg. Vieg loses the fight and when Yorath is closing in for the kill he narrowly evades a jump attack from behind by Olgar. Olgar fights against Yorath and despite being outmatched Olgar refuses to die and eventually Yorath is hurt badly enough that he has to escape. At that point, the final bell tolls and Yorath tells Vieg and Olgar that they are too late. Both Vahti and Ohm drop down towards the lava. Olgar grabs a floor panel and throws it under them, wedging it into a metal strut. He then jumps after them and grabs them, but the floor panel gives way and they all fall into the lava.

Olgar lives, knee deep in the lava and carries Vahti and Ohm to safety. As he's sinking into the lava, he tells Vieg that he's to take Olgar's old job and name as captain and that Olgar himself will go back to his old name Dante and then sinks the rest of the way into the lava.

We flash forward to Vieg, now Olgar, neglecting Vahti and Ohm to fight solo and make himself stronger. He is angry that he wasn't able to do more to help. Vahti calms him down and they agree to go together to finish the fight with Cyllis. They go further into the Conglom Plant and eventually confront Yorath. This time, they have gotten strong enough to defeat him and he yields to them. They then get to Cyllis and fight and defeat her. As a last-ditch measure, Cyllis spawns a Conglom that's a beastlike combination of Dante and Rachel. Olgar and Vahti defeat it and Theia announces that the Original Door is now open and Cyllis promises that the conflict isn't over, but Dante/Rachel hold her back while Olgar and Vahti escape.

When Olgar and Vahti go out of the Original Door, they find that they are on the deck of the Ark, which is still going back in time. Cyllis breaks through the deck and tells them that Theia opened the Original Door too early and that this spacetime outside the Ark will cease to exist soon. Cyllis blocks their exit back into the Ark while Olgar and Vahti defeat her. She still blocks their exit, though, until Yorath shows up and warps them out. Cyllis and Yorath die together when the Ark drops back into normal spacetime. Now, Olgar, Vahti, and Ohm are back on Earth 10,000 years in the past and are told that they will be the new Original Couple and need to rebuild a new human race capable of defeating the Qualia. Theia tells them that their descendants will be the ones that bring about the final battle and warps off.

== Soundtrack ==
The game's soundtrack is composed by Noriyasu Agematsu with only eight songs in the official soundtrack.

== Reception ==
Reception

Aggregate score
Aggregator	Score
Metacritic	(iPhone) 82/100 (iPad) 75/100

Review scores
Publication	Score
Destructoid	5.5/10
Gamekult	6/10
GamePro	3.5/5
Gamezebo	4/5
Jeuxvideo.com	13/20
Pocket Gamer	(iPad) 3.5/5
RPGFan	86%
TouchArcade	4/5
Metro	7/10

The iPhone and iPad versions received "generally favorable reviews" according to the review aggregation website Metacritic.
