= Yusuke Naora =

Japanese video game art director

Yusuke Naora (直良 有祐, Naora Yūsuke) (born January 9, 1971) is a Japanese video game art director and character designer who worked for Square Enix (formerly Square). A former member of Toaplan, Naora served as the art director for several Final Fantasy and Compilation of Final Fantasy VII titles. He also served as the producer of the Code Age franchise. On October 1, 2016 he announced on Twitter that he had left the company, but would continue to contribute to Square Enix games as a freelancer.

== Biography ==
=== Final Fantasy X ===
Naora described the game as a "journey", and the Besaid Village from the game was heavily influenced by his trip to Bali, Indonesia, where he saw seaside towns, temples, people handing out tropical flowers, and distinctive dress.

=== Code Age Commanders ===
Naora worked on the game Code Age Commanders for three years, in cooperation with a group he assembled for this project called "War Head". The game was conceived to be a new game, unlike Final Fantasy, and could be made into a game for the PlayStation 2, a manga, and a cell phone game. Some of the drawing is done by Naora himself. In order to simulate the nature of two handed combat, multiple buttons are utilized in combat. The game was designed to appeal to the western desire for game customization.

=== The Last Remnant ===
Naora took note of the popularity of Fallout 3, and the growing differences between Japanese and Western RPGs. He then undertook to compare the two styles to appeal to both audiences. Naora developed the game "from the ground up" to appeal to both Japanese and Western audiences, and undertook extensive customer research into American gaming desires and tastes.

=== Final Fantasy Type-0 ===
Naora was on a staff of three for Type-0 in 2006, but development began in 2008 due to ongoing work on Crisis Core: Final Fantasy VII, and even then not fully until 2009 due to The 3rd Birthday. Naora worked to create the backstory for the game, and the built up the fourteen characters life stories. He developed the country designs and the main game visuals. It was the longest he had ever worked on a single game.

=== Crystal Conquest ===
Naora was the art director for Crystal Conquest.

=== Final Fantasy X Remaster ===
Naora outlined the focus of the Final Fantasy X Remaster from an artistic perspective as being color correction, fixing errors and increasing the games resolution.

=== Final Fantasy XV ===
Having worked on the game since its title was changed, Naora was very excited and nervous creating a trailer for the game to appear on copies of Final Fantasy Type-0 HD.

== Other activities ==
Naora delivered a lecture in 2015 at SMU Guildhall college entitled "The Visual Evolution of Final Fantasy" where he discussed the visual changes from creating with pixel graphics to 3D characters.

== Games ==
- Grind Stormer (1993) - Art director
- Final Fantasy VI (1994) - Field graphic designer
- Chrono Trigger (1995) - Field graphic designer
- Treasure Conflix (1996) - Visual designer
- Final Fantasy VII (1997) - Art director
- Final Fantasy VIII (1999) - Art director
- Vagrant Story (2000) - Accessories designer (CGI intro movie)
- The Bouncer (2000) - Art supervisor
- Final Fantasy X (2001) - Art director
- Unlimited Saga (2002) - Art director
- Front Mission 4 (2003) - Character designer
- Before Crisis: Final Fantasy VII (2004) - Art director
- Romancing SaGa: Minstrel Song (2005) - Art director
- Final Fantasy VII: Advent Children (2005) - Art director
- Code Age Commanders (2005) - Producer, Art director, Story
- Code Age Brawls (2005) - Producer, Art director, Story
- Front Mission 5: Scars of the War (2005) - Character designer
- Dirge of Cerberus: Final Fantasy VII (2006) - Art supervisor
- Crisis Core: Final Fantasy VII (2007) - Art supervisor
- Song Summoner: The Unsung Heroes (2008) - Character designer
- The Last Remnant (2008) - Art producer, Character designer
- Lufia: Curse of the Sinistrals (2010) - Character designer
- Chaos Rings (2010) - Character designer
- Chaos Rings Omega (2011) - Character designer
- Chaos Rings II (2011) - Character designer
- Final Fantasy Type-0 (2011) - Art director
- Final Fantasy X/X-2 HD Remaster (2013) - Supervisor
- Final Fantasy Type-0 HD (2015) - Art director
- Cosmos Rings (2016) - Key visual arts
- Final Fantasy XV (2016) - Art director
