= Code Age Brawls =

2005 video game

- Logo
- Developer: Square Enix
- Publisher: Square Enix
- Director: Toru Osanai
- Producers: Yusuke Naora; Takanori Kimura
- Programmer: Yasunobu Ito
- Artist: Toshiyuki Itahana
- Writer: Miwa Shoda
- Composer: Kumi Tanioka
- Series: Code Age
- Platform: Mobile phones
- Release: JP: December 19, 2005
- Genre: Role-playing
- Modes: Single-player, multiplayer

Code Age Brawls: Futatsu no Kodō (コード・エイジブロウルズ～二つの鼓動～) is a 2005 role-playing video game developed and published by Square Enix for mobile phones. Forming part of the Code Age media franchise, the story follows the character Lost L as they resist an apocalypse caused by an artificial world's control system, joining a resistance group's fight against the hostile Afternova faction. Gameplay consists of turn-based battles where the player absorbs the abilities of defeated opponents. A player-versus-player multiplayer function was prominently featured.

The concept for Code Age was created in 2002 by Yusuke Naora, with the development team of Brawls using the project to expand upon the multiplayer communication of Before Crisis: Final Fantasy VII. Miwa Shoda wrote the scenario, while Kumi Tanioka composed the soundtrack. As with the rest of Code Age, Brawls remained exclusive to Japan. It was released as five story chapters between December 2005 and July 2006, before shutting down in September 2006. Western journalists praised the demo for its graphics, while a Japanese review noted issues with its network multiplayer.

== Gameplay ==
Screenshot of a battle in Code Age Brawls

Code Age Brawls is a role-playing video game in which players control the character Lost L. Players navigate through environments created using 2D pre-rendered artwork, while battles take place in 3D arenas. Battles are turn-based and consist of five rounds. The player must select actions represented by colored badges, with each having strengths and weaknesses to others similar to a rock-paper-scissors mechanic. Once player and enemy have made a selection, the badges are revealed, and the winner does damage to the opposing player based on the difference between their levels.

The badge colors are ranked in power from highest to lowest as yellow, red, blue, purple, and gray. Players can pass their turn to save their badges for later rounds, otherwise dealing damage when their badge equal to their opponent's badge level, or higher. After winning a battle, the player gains access to the opponent's form and abilities, equivalent to a character class with themed weapons and equipment, and variations depending on the lead's gender. A chosen form also influences how players can use their badges.

The original version features single-player combat against computer opponents, as well as player-versus-player multiplayer combat by networking and matchmaking with nearby phones. The game also features an in-game Battle Arena where players battle AI-controlled teams of three, which was expanded to player-versus-player in April 2006. Players can also use their location as a base and team up with others in their location to attack other people's bases.

== Synopsis ==
Code Age Brawls takes place on the internal surface of a hollow world similar to a Dyson sphere, also called an "intraglobular world" (球内世界, kyuunai sekai). At the sphere's center is the Central Code, a structure which resets the world every ten thousand years by wiping out the current civilization in an event called the Reborn. In an attempt to survive the next Reborn, the current civilization constructs arks around the Central Code. The plan fails when the Central Code destroys the Arks and births the Otellos, a species that warps most survivors into mindless Coded. Some are instead transformed into powerful warriors dubbed Warheads. Survivors splinter into factions, some fighting each other and others hiding underground.

The game follows Lost L, a survivor who is transformed into an incomplete Warhead. Due to this condition causing bodily degradation, Lost L must battle other Warheads to steal their bodies. Lost L joins forces with a vigilante group facing off against the hostile Afternova faction, learning about their past and the Ark project along the way. The final chapter focuses on Lost L meeting up with Commanders characters Gene and Meme to confront both Afternova's leader and R, a character from Archive with a similar condition to Lost L.

== Development ==
The concept for the Code Age world was created by Yusuke Naora in 2002, prior to the 2003 merger of Square and Enix to become Square Enix. Code Age formed part of Square Enix's plan to develop "polymorphic content", a marketing and sales strategy to "[provide] well-known properties on several platforms, allowing exposure of the products to as wide an audience as possible"; this approach included Compilation of Final Fantasy VII and the World of Mana. Naora's concept was created independent of this policy. Production of the Code Age projects was handled by a group dubbed "Warhead". Naora, who also produced,Code Age Commanders, was co-producer with Takanori Kimura. The director was Toru Osanai, while the character designs were created by Toshiyuki Itahana. The music was composed by Kumi Tanioka, who also worked on Commanders.

Miwa Shoda, who had previously worked on SaGa Frontier and Legend of Mana, wrote the scenario. The storyline of Brawls featured character cameos from Commanders and Archive, tying the three projects into a larger narrative. When creating the gameplay, the team wanted to expand upon the Materia System of Before Crisis: Final Fantasy VII, where players could communicate and exchange Materia with each other. While in the latter game the communication was one way only, Brawls incorporated two-way matchmaking for player battles. The environments were designed in a similar way to Final Fantasy VII and VIII, projecting 3D character models onto 2D pre-rendered backgrounds. Using 3D graphics for the whole game would have put too much strain on the hardware, so 3D environments were reserved for battle sections, with the team still wanting to push the graphical limits of phones. The manga-style story cutscenes were chosen to fit the mobile format.

== Release ==
Square Enix registered the trademark for Code Age Brawls in September 2004, alongside other trademarks relating to the Code Age project. The game was announced at a Square Enix press conference prior to E3 2005, with a projected release in 2005. As with the Compilation, each project was abbreviated using a lettering formula; "CAA" stood for Archives, "CAC" for Commanders, and "CAB" for Brawls. It was also shown at the Tokyo Game Show in August 2005. A free trial beta test was from November 10 to November 30.

The game released on December 15 for NTT DoCoMo-compatible devices. Code Age Brawls was a subscription-based game, with players needing to pay a monthly fee in order to continue accessing the game. As part the game's promotion, Square Enix ran a lottery campaign for a themed cushion and mobile cleaner. Players of Commanders could use a code to gain early access to a rare battle card.

The first chapter was released on December 15, 2005, with the remaining four chapters released the following year on January 24, March 14, May 14, and July 3. Released alongside these chapters were a new character class, updates to the game's community website, the battle arena, and support for NTT DoCoMo's i-area service to facilitate easy player match-ups. While a North American release was reportedly planned for 2006, Brawls and the other Code Age projects went unreleased outside Japan. Brawls closed down on September 30, 2006.

== Reception ==
Western journalists were impressed by the games trailer reveal. IGN described its graphics as "stunning", especially noting the games very detailed character models. Stephen Pallet of GameSpot positively noted the game footage for its smooth graphical textures.

During a hands-on playtest at TGS 2005, GameSpot's Carrie Gouskos praised the combat, highlighting the badge system's strategic depth. Reviewing the initial release, Japanese website ITMedia praised the combat as refreshing compared to other games on the market, but negatively noted frequent server connection issues during multiplayer matches.
