= The Museum II =

Greatest hits album by Nana Mizuki
- Released: 23 November 2011 (Japan); 9 December 2011 (Taiwan)
- Genre: J-pop, rock, pop-rock, electronic rock, synthpop
- Length: 76:06
- Label: King Records

Nana Mizuki chronology
Impact Exciter (2010)	The Museum II (2011)	Rockbound Neighbors (2012)

CD + DVD Edition

Singles from The Museum II
- 1. "Scarlet Knight" Released: April 13, 2011; 2. "Pop Master" Released: April 13, 2011; 3. "Junketsu Paradox" Released: August 3, 2011

The Museum II is the second Greatest hits album by Japanese voice actress and pop singer Nana Mizuki. It was released on November 23, 2011 in two editions: a CD+DVD edition and a CD+Blu-ray edition. Every edition includes a special bonus: the Music Clip of Pop Master and the Nana Mizuki's performance in Nakano Sun Plaza "Mizuki Nana Ooini Utau". The Museum II reached number 3 in the Oricon Weekly charts and number 2 in the Taiwanese J-pop charts.

== Track listing ==
1. Secret Ambition (15th single)
  - Lyrics: Nana Mizuki
  - Composition: Chiyomaru Shikura
  - Arrangement: Hitoshi Fujima (Elements Garden)
  - First opening theme for anime television series Magical Girl Lyrical Nanoha Strikers
2. Massive Wonders (16th single)
  - Lyrics: Nana Mizuki
  - Composition, arrangement: Toshiro Yabuki
  - Second opening theme for anime television series Magical Girl Lyrical Nanoha StrikerS.
  - Ending theme in August for Nippon TV show Shiodome Event-bu (汐留イベント部).
3. Astrogation (17th single)
  - Lyrics: Hibiki
  - Composition, arrangement: Jun Suyama
  - Theme in February for TV program Music Fighter
4. Trickster (18th single)
  - Lyrics: Nana Mizuki
  - Composition, arrangement: Noriyasu Agematsu (Elements Garden)
  - Animelo Music TV-CF and "Music Fighter" Power Play
5. Shin'ai (19th single)
  - Lyrics: Nana Mizuki
  - Composition: Noriyasu Agematsu (Elements Garden)
  - Arrangement: Hitoshi Fujima (Elements Garden)
  - Opening theme for anime television series White Album
6. Mugen (20th single)
  - Lyrics: Nana Mizuki
  - Composition: Noriyasu Agematsu (Elements Garden)
  - Arrangement: Junpei Fujita
  - Second opening theme for anime television series White Album
7. Phantom Minds (21st single)
  - Lyrics: Nana Mizuki
  - Composition: Eriko Yoshiki
  - Arrangement: Jun Suyama
  - Opening theme for anime film Magical Girl Lyrical Nanoha The Movie 1st
8. Silent Bible (22nd single)
  - Lyrics: Nana Mizuki
  - Composition: Haruki Mori (Elements Garden)
  - Arrangement: Daisuke Kikuta (Elements Garden)
  - Opening theme for PlayStation Portable game Magical Girl Lyrical Nanoha A's Portable: The Battle of Aces
9. Scarlet Knight (23rd single)
  - Lyrics: Nana Mizuki
  - Composition, arrangement: Hitoshi Fujima (Elements Garden)
  - Opening theme for anime television series Dog Days
  - Ending theme for TV Asahi program Onegai! Ranking in April
  - Ending theme for Ehime Asahi TV program Love Chu! Chu! in April
10. Pop Master (24th single)
  - Lyrics, composition: Nana Mizuki
  - Arrangement: Hitoshi Fujima (Elements Garden)
  - Cheering song for NTV's 31st High School Quiz
  - Theme song for mobile game Idol o Tsukuro
11. Junketsu Paradox (25th single)
  - Lyrics: Nana Mizuki
  - Composition: Eriko Yoshiki
  - Arrangement: Jun Suyama
  - Ending theme for anime television series Blood-C
12. Pray
  - Lyrics: Hibiki
  - Composition, arrangement: Noriyasu Agematsu (Elements Garden)
  - Insert song for anime television series Magical Girl Lyrical Nanoha StrikerS
13. Cosmic Love
  - Lyrics: Ryōji Sonoda
  - Composition, arrangement: Junpei Fujita (Elements Garden)
  - Opening theme for anime television series Rosario to Vampire.
14. Discotheque
  - Lyrics: Ryōji Sonoda
  - Composition, arrangement: Noriyasu Agematsu (Elements Garden)
  - Opening theme for anime television series Rosario to Vampire Capu2.
15. Meikyuu Butterfly -diverse-
  - Lyrics: Peach-Pit, Yuuya Saitou
  - Composition: Daice
  - Arrangement: Junpei Fujita
  - Remixed version of the original Meikyuu Butterfly song from the anime television series Shugo Chara!
16. Romancers' Neo
  - Lyrics: Hibiki
  - Composition: Noriyasu Agematsu (Elements Garden)
  - Arrangement: Junpei Fujita (Elements Garden)
  - Opening theme for PlayStation Portable game Magical Girl Lyrical Nanoha A's Portable: The Gears of Destiny
17. Super Generation -Museum Style-
  - Lyrics, composition: Nana Mizuki
  - Arrangement: Mika Agematsu
  - Remixed slower version of the original Super Generation song

== DVD & Blu-ray track list ==
1. [Music Clip]: Pop Master
2. Nakano Sun Plaza "Mizuki Nana Ooini Utau"

== Oricon Sales Chart (Japan) ==
Album
Chart	Peak position	First-day/week sales	Sales total	Chart run
Oricon Daily Charts	2	29,271 (First Day)	129,448	25 weeks
Oricon Weekly Charts	3	82, 649	129,448	25 weeks
Oricon Yearly Charts	58	105,409	129,448	25 weeks

"Scarlet Knight"
Chart	Peak position	First Day/Week sales	Sales total
Oricon Daily Charts	2	15,897 (First day)	87,209
Oricon Weekly Charts	2	55,366	87,209
Oricon Monthly Charts	7	72,004	87,209
Oricon Yearly Charts	89	87,209	87,209
