= List of Magical Girl Lyrical Nanoha albums =

Magical Girl Lyrical Nanoha franchise discography
- Studio albums: 1
- Soundtrack albums: 9
- Compilation albums: 10
- Singles: 8
- Drama CDs: 14

Magical Girl Lyrical Nanoha is a fantasy adventure anime and manga series written by Masaki Tsuzuki. Set in a fictional universe, its storyline follows several different users of magic as they become involved with incidents related to powerful ancient artifacts. Four anime series have been produced by Seven Arcs between 2004 and 2009 with music direction by Toshiki Kameyama. The first season anime television series titled Magical Girl Lyrical Nanoha directed by Akiyuki Shinbo was broadcast in 2004 spanning thirteen episodes. The second season of the anime series titled Magical Girl Lyrical Nanoha A's directed by Keizō Kusakawa was broadcast in 2005 spanning thirteen episodes. A third season of the anime series titled Magical Girl Lyrical Nanoha StrikerS directed by Keizō Kusakawa was broadcast in 2007 spanning twenty-six episodes. An anime film readaptation of the first season of the anime series was released in 2010. The discography for these series consist of ten soundtrack albums, three compilation albums, nine maxi singles, one studio album, and fourteen drama CDs.

The discography for the Magical Girl Lyrical Nanoha franchise was all produced by King Records. The ten soundtrack albums composed by Hiroaki Sano were released by King Records between 2005 and 2008. The eight maxi singles released by both King Records and Konami Digital Entertainment between 2004 and 2007 that each either contain a piece of theme music or an insert song featured in the many anime series. The one studio album was released by King Records in 2004 containing an insert song featured in the first season of the anime series. Three compilation albums collecting various tracks used throughout the three anime television series were released from 2007 to 2009 and fourteen drama CDs released between 2004 and 2009.

== Magical Girl Lyrical Nanoha ==
=== Innocent Starter ===
"Innocent Starter" is a maxi single performed by Nana Mizuki first released on October 6, 2004 by King Records, bearing the catalog number KICM-1115. The lyrics, composition, and arrangement for the single are provided by Nana Mizuki, Tsutomu Ōhira, Takahiro Iida, and Chiyomaru Shikura. The single contains 6 tracks in regular and instrumental versions. The track "Innocent Starter" is featured as the opening theme in the anime television series Magical Girl Lyrical Nanoha. Its B-sides are titled "Open Your Heart" and "Sore Demo Kimi o Omoidasu Kara: Again" (それでも君を想い出すから -again-; lit. Nevertheless I Recall You: Again). It peak ranked 9th on the Oricon singles chart and remained on the chart for eight weeks.

=== Little Wish (Lyrical Step) ===
"Little Wish (Lyrical Step)" (Little Wish～lyrical step～) is a maxi single performed by Tamura Yukari first released on October 21, 2004 by Konami Digital Entertainment bearing the catalog number KMCM-40. The song "Little Wish (Lyrical Step)" was featured as the ending theme to the anime Magical Girl Lyrical Nanoha. The lyrics, composition, and arrangement for the single are provided by Karen Shiina, Masatomo Ota, Kanade Kotowa, and Kazuya Komatsu. The single contains three tracks. Its A-side "Little Wish (Lyrical Step)" is featured as the ending theme in the anime television series Magical Girl Lyrical Nanoha. Its B-sides are titled "Eien" (永遠; lit. Eternity) and "Sweet Darlin' ". It peak ranked 32nd on the Oricon singles chart and remained on the chart for four weeks.

=== Alive & Kicking ===
Alive & Kicking is a studio album performed by Nana Mizuki first released on December 8, 2004 by King Records bearing the catalog number KICS-1125. The lyrics, composition, and arrangement for the album are provided by Yabuki Toshirō, Nana Mizuki, sutomu Ōhira, Takahiro Iida, Yūmao, Noriyasu Agematsu, Akimitsu Honma, Kenji Kitajima and Naoko. The album contains fourteen tracks and covers a duration of 65:08. It contains the track "Take a Shot" that was featured as an insert song in episode twelve of anime series Magical Girl Lyrical Nanoha. It also featured the track "Innocent Starter", which was used as the opening theme for the same series.

=== Magical Girl Lyrical Nanoha Original Soundtrack ===
The Magical Girl Lyrical Nanoha Original Soundtrack (魔法少女リリカルなのは Original Sound Track, Mahō Shōjo Lyrical Nanoha Original Sound Track) containing all the tracks composed by Hiroaki Sano used as background music for the anime television series Magical Girl Lyrical Nanoha. It was first released on May 11, 2005 by King Records bearing the catalog number KICA-693. It contains forty-one tracks and covers a duration of 1:13:34. It features short versions of the opening and ending themes for the anime series performed Nana Mizuki and Tamura Yukari respectively as well as the two tracks containing the lines of dialogue spoken by the two intelligent devices Raising Heart and Bardiche performed by Donna Burke and Kevin J. England respectively. It peak ranked 117th on the Oricon albums chart and remained on the chart for one week.-

Track listing
| No. | Title | Performance | Length |
|---|---|---|---|
| 1. | "Innocent Starter (TV-Size)" | Nana Mizuki | 1:48 |
| 2. | "Shukumei no Ori, Unmei no Wa" (宿命の檻、運命の輪, Destiny's Cage, Fate's Ring) | | 1:46 |
| 3. | "Negai, Yami no Naka de" (願い、闇の中で, Wish, in the Middle of the Darkness) | | 1:41 |
| 4. | "Raising Heart Set Up!" (レイジングハート・セットアップ！ Reijingu Hāto Setto Appu!) | | 1:53 |
| 5. | "Afureru Power Muteki no Yūki" (溢れるパワー・無敵の勇気 Afureru Pawā Muteki no Yūki, Overflowing Power Unbeatable Courage) | | 2:04 |
| 6. | "Kuroki Yagayaki" (黒き輝き, Black Radiance) | | 1:04 |
| 7. | "Gin no Tsubasa ~ Arthra" (銀の翼～アースラ Gin no Tsubasa ~ Āsura, Silver Wings ~ Arthra) | | 2:03 |
| 8. | "Chi no Bakukusari" (血の縛鎖, Blood's Bindings) | | 2:36 |
| 9. | "Kizuna, Shinjite" (絆、信じて, Bonds, Believe) | | 2:27 |
| 10. | "Daijōbu da yo" (大丈夫だよ, It's Okay) | | 1:39 |
| 11. | "Kono Hiroi Sekai ni" (この広い世界に, In This Large World) | | 2:27 |
| 12. | "Tanoshii Kyūjitsu" (楽しい休日, Fun Holiday) | | 1:52 |
| 13. | "Honobono...?" (ほのぼの。。。？, A Heartwarming...?) | | 1:23 |
| 14. | "Nonbiri Shimasho" (のんびりしましょ, Let's Do It Leisurely) | | 1:34 |
| 15. | "Hashire!" (走れ！, Run!) | | 1:34 |
| 16. | "Eeto Desu ne" (ええとですね, Uhm Let's See) | | 0:43 |
| 17. | "Kesenai Kako, Modoranai Toki" (消せない過去、戻らない時, Inerasable Past, Unrecoverable Time) | | 1:59 |
| 18. | "Yochō" (予兆, Omen) | | 1:43 |
| 19. | "Raikō Shūrai" (雷光襲来, Lighting Attack) | | 2:28 |
| 20. | "Kinkyū Jitai" (緊急事態, Emergency State) | | 2:12 |
| 21. | "Arashi no Naka de" (嵐の中で, In the Middle of the Storm) | | 1:35 |
| 22. | "Ketsudan no Toki" (決断の時, Time to Make a Decision) | | 1:45 |
| 23. | "Yuzurenai Omoi" (ゆずれない思い, Unyiedable Emotions) | | 2:02 |
| 24. | "Unkai o Nukete" (雲海を抜けて, Go Through the Sea of Clouds) | | 2:19 |
| 25. | "Ugokidasu Shukumei" (動き出す宿命, Destiny Coming Alive) | | 2:04 |
| 26. | "Hishō" (飛翔, Flying) | | 1:45 |
| 27. | "Uchinuite, Yoru mo Kurayami mo" (撃ち抜いて、夜も暗闇も, Shoot Out, Night and Darkness) | | 2:05 |
| 28. | "Omoi, Anata e" (想い、あなたへ Feelings, To You) | | 1:54 |
| 29. | "Tsudoe, Hoshi no Kagayaki ~ Starlight Breaker" (集え、星の輝き～スターライト・ブレイカー, Assemble, Light of the Star ~ Starlight Breaker) | | 1:38 |
| 30. | "Kuzureyuku Sekai" (崩れゆく世界, The Crumbling World) | | 2:31 |
| 31. | "Shukumei no Yukusue" (宿命の行く末, Destiny's Fate) | | 2:04 |
| 32. | "Yasuragi" (やすらぎ, Tranquility) | | 1:38 |
| 33. | "Namae o Yonde" (なまえをよんで, Call My Name) | | 1:54 |
| 34. | "Kimi ni Aitakunatta Nara" (君に会いたくなったなら, If I Do Not Want to Meet You) | | 1:42 |
| 35. | "Little Wish ~lyrical step~ (TV-size)" | Yukari Tamura | 1:50 |
| 36. | "Nano!" (なの！) | | 0:09 |
| 37. | "Eyecatch 1" (アイキャッチ1 Aikyacchi 1) | | 0:06 |
| 38. | "Eyecatch 2" (アイキャッチ2 Aikyacchi 2) | | 0:06 |
| 39. | "Lyrical Magical, Ganbarimasu!" (リリカルマジカル、がんばります！ Ririkaru Majikaru, Ganbarimasu!, Lyrical Magical, Try Your Best!) | | 2:04 |
| 40. | "Tsue Voice Raising Heart (Bonus Track)" (杖ボイス レイジングハート(ボーナストラック) Tsue Boisu Reijingu Hāto (Bōnasu Torakku), Staff Voice Raising Heart (Bonus Track)) | Donna Burke | 3:07 |
| 41. | "Tsue Voice Bardiche (Bonus Track)" ((杖ボイス バルディッシュ(ボーナストラック) Tsue Boisu Barudisshu (Bōnasu Torakku), Staff Voice Bardiche (Bonus Track)) | Kevin J. England | 1:58 |
| Total length: | | | 1:13:34 |

=== Magical Girl Lyrical Nanoha The Movie 1st Original Soundtrack ===
The original soundtrack for the Magical Girl Lyrical Nanoha The Movie 1st was composed by Hiroaki Sano and was released in two discs by King Records on January 23, 2010. It covers forty-six tracks.

Track listing

Disc 1
| No. | Title | Music | Length |
|---|---|---|---|
| 1. | "Kono Hiroi Sekai ni" (この広い世界に, In This Broad World) |
| 2. | "Negai, Yami no Naka de" (願い、闇の中で, Wish, in the Dark) |
| 3. | "Uminari Shi, Haru" (海鳴市、春, Uminari City, Spring) |
| 4. | "Presentiment" |
| 5. | "Shūrai ~ Aragau Chikara" (襲来~抗う力, Invasion ~ Resistance) |
| 6. | "Raising Heart Set up!" |
| 7. | "Sora Kakeru Chikara" (空駆ける力, Power to Run Freely) |
| 8. | "Emergency" |
| 9. | "Jewel seed" |
| 10. | "Mirai Yosō" (未来予想, Future Expectation) |
| 11. | "Blitz of Gold" |
| 12. | "First Impact" |
| 13. | "Itoshisa to Sabishisa" (愛しさと寂しさ, Love and Loneliness) |
| 14. | "Yokaze" (夜風, Night Wind) |
| 15. | "Raimei" (雷鳴, Thunder) |
| 16. | "Senkō Mai Chiru" (閃光舞い散る, Flashes Away) |
| 17. | "Innocent starter (Instrumental & Orgol MIX)" | Tsutomu Ōhira |
| 18. | "Gin no Tsubasa" (銀の翼, Silver Wings) |
| 19. | "Kyozetsu" (拒絶, Rejection) |
| 20. | "Chīsana Kizuna" (小さな絆, A Small Bond) |
| 21. | "Mada Namae Mo Kiite Nai" (まだ名前も聞いてない, I Have Not Heard a Name Yet) |
| 22. | "Executioner" |
| 23. | "Heart of Japanesque" |
| 24. | "Lost worlds" |
| 25. | "Chikai no Riyū" (誓いの理由, Reason for Vow) |

Disc 2
| No. | Title | Music | Length |
|---|---|---|---|
| 1. | "Arashi Ame" (嵐雨, Stormy Weather) |
| 2. | "Tsutae Tai Omoi" (伝えたい思い, I Want to Tell You) |
| 3. | "Tettai Ikusa" (撤退戦, Withdraw) |
| 4. | "Blood" |
| 5. | "Hinadori no Tsubasa ~ Flying high!" (雛鳥の翼~Flying high!, Chick Bird's Wing ~ Flying High!) |
| 6. | "Duel" |
| 7. | "Watashi no Okā-san" (わたしのおかあさん, My Mom) |
| 8. | "Phalanx" |
| 9. | "Hoshi no Kagayaki" (星の輝き, The Glow of Stars) |
| 10. | "Kuro Kaminari" (黒雷, Black Thunder) |
| 11. | "Alicia Testarossa" (アリシア・テスタロッサ, Arishia Tesutarossa) |
| 12. | "Tabidachi no Utage" (旅立ちの宴, A Feast for Departure) |
| 13. | "Artesaim no Shiki" (アルトセイムの四季, Arutoseimu no Shiki, Four Seasons of Artesaim) |
| 14. | "Aijō" (愛情, Love) |
| 15. | "Toki no Teien" (時の庭園, Garden of Time) |
| 16. | "Nando Mo, Nando Mo" (何度も、何度も, Again and Again) |
| 17. | "Hontō no Kimochi" (本当の気持ち, Real Feelings) |
| 18. | "Kikan" (帰還, Return) |
| 19. | "Kimi ni Ai Taku Natta Nara" (君に逢いたくなったなら, If You Want to See Me) |
| 20. | "Namae wo Yonde" (なまえをよんで, Read the Name) |
| 21. | "Little Wish ~lyrical step~ (Instrumental & Orgol MIX)" | Masatomo Ōta |

== Magical Girl Lyrical Nanoha A's ==
=== Eternal Blaze ===
"Eternal Blaze" is a maxi single by Nana Mizuki first released on October 19, 2005 by King Records bearing the catalog number KICM-1148. The lyrics, composition, and arrangement for the single are provided by Nana Mizuki, Noriyasu Agematsu, Bee, Hitoshi Fujima, Ryōji Sonoda, and Wataru Masachi. The single contains three tracks. Its A-side "Eternal Blaze" is featured as the opening theme in the anime television series Magical Girl Lyrical Nanoha A's. Its B-sides are titled "Rush & Dash!" and "Inside of Mind". It peak-ranked 2nd on the Oricon singles chart and remained on the chart for fifteen weeks.

=== Spiritual Garden ===
"Spiritual Garden" is a maxi single by Yukari Tamura first released on October 26, 2005 by Konami Digital Entertainment bearing the catalog number GBCM-7. The lyrics, composition, and arrangement for the single are provided by Yukiko Mitsui, Masatomo Ota, Manami Fujino, Yukari Hashimoto, Ucio, and Toshimichi Tsuge. The single contains three tracks. Its A-side "Spiritual Garden" is featured as the ending theme in the anime television series Magical Girl Lyrical Nanoha A's. Its B-sides are titled "Cutie Cutie" and "Travelling with a Sheep". It peak ranked 10th on the Oricon singles chart and remained on the chart for five weeks.

=== Super Generation ===
"Super Generation" is a maxi single by Nana Mizuki first released on January 18, 2006 by King Records bearing the catalog number KICM-1156. The lyrics, composition, and arrangement for the single are provided by Nana Mizuki, Junpei Fujita, Noriyasu Agematsu, Yamato Itō, Nittoku Inōe. The single contains three tracks. Its B-side "Brave Phoenix" was featured as an insert song to episode twelve of the anime television series Magical Girl Lyrical Nanoha A's. Its A-side is titled "Super Generation" and its other B-side is titled "Hikari" (光; lit. Light). It peak ranked 6th on the Oricon singles chart and remained on the chart for six weeks.

=== Magical Girl Lyrical Nanoha A's original soundtracks ===
The original soundtrack for the anime television series Magical Girl Lyrical Nanoha A's was composed by Hiroaki Sano and was released across six soundtrack albums that were each bundled with its respective DVD compilation volume that was released for the series. King Records released the six CDs titled Magical Girl Lyrical Nanoha A's Original Soundtrack Plus Vol.1~6 between January 25, 2006 and June 21, 2006. In total, the six CDs contain fifty-seven tracks and cover a duration of 43:54. Each CD features tracks containing background music used during the anime series as well as the lines of dialogue that each intelligent device that the protagonists and antagonists of the anime series use performed by their respective voice actors.

Track listing

Vol.1
| No. | Title | Performance | Length |
|---|---|---|---|
| 1. | "Chīsana Negai" (小さな願い, Small Wish) | | 1:37 |
| 2. | "Haruka Naru Ishi" (遥かなる意思, A Receding Purpose) | | 2:06 |
| 3. | "Concentration" | | 2:37 |
| 4. | "Kin no Senkō" (金の閃光, Blitz of Gold) | | 1:45 |
| 5. | "For You For Me" | | 1:56 |
| 6. | "Drive Ignition!" (ドライブ・イグニッション！ Doraibu Igunisshon) | | 0:35 |
| 7. | "Raising Heart (#1~#3)" (レイジングハート（#1～#3） Reijingu Hāto (#1~#3)) | Donna Burke | 3:14 |
| 8. | "Bardiche (#1~#3)" (バルディッシュ（#1～#3） Barudishhu (#1~#3)) | Kevin J. England | 0:20 |
| 9. | "Graf Eisen (#1~#3)" (グラーフアイゼン（#1～#3） Gurāfu Aizen (#1~#3)) | Tetsuya Kakihara | 0:46 |
| 10. | "Laevatein (#1~#3)" (レヴァンティン（#1～#3） Revantian (#1~#3)) | Tetsuya Kakihara | 0:21 |
| 11. | "Klarer Wind (#1~#3)" (クラールヴィント（#1～#3） Kurāru Vinto (#1~#3)) | Alexandra Haefelin | 0:11 |
| 12. | "Yami no Sho (#1~#3)" (闇の書（#1～#3）, Book of Darkness (#1~#3)) | Alexandra Haefelin | 0:19 |
| Total length: | | | 15:55 |

Vol.2
| No. | Title | Performance | Length |
|---|---|---|---|
| 1. | "Itami wo Koete" (痛みを越えて, Surpassing the Pain) | | 2:11 |
| 2. | "Sōkyū, Tsuranuite" (蒼穹、貫いて, Blue Sky, Go Through) | | 1:38 |
| 3. | "Yokan" (予感, Premonition) | | 1:47 |
| 4. | "Sunny Day Holiday" | | 1:49 |
| 5. | "High-Speed Action" | | 1:46 |
| 6. | "An'un no Sanaka" (暗雲の最中 In the Midst of Dark Clouds) | | 2:00 |
| 7. | "Raising Heart (#4~#5)" (レイジングハート（#4～#5） Reijingu Hāto (#4~#5)) | Donna Burke | 1:38 |
| 8. | "Bardiche (#4~#5)" (バルディッシュ（#4～#5） Barudishhu (#4~#5)) | Kevin J. England | 1:03 |
| 9. | "Graf Eisen (#4~#5)" (グラーフアイゼン（#4～#5） Gurāfu Aizen (#4~#5)) | Tetsuya Kakihara | 0:18 |
| 10. | "Laevatein (#4~#5)" (レヴァンティン（#4～#5） Revantian (#4~#5)) | Tetsuya Kakihara | 0:25 |
| 11. | "Yami no Sho (#4~#5)" (闇の書（#4～#5）, Book of Darkness (#4~#5)) | Alexandra Haefelin | 0:11 |
| Total length: | | | 14:51 |

Vol.3
| No. | Title | Performance | Length |
|---|---|---|---|
| 1. | "Ginen" (疑念, Doubt) | | 1:42 |
| 2. | "Miscasting-1" | | 1:44 |
| 3. | "Miscasting-2" | | 1:37 |
| 4. | "Tama ni wa Nonbiri, ne" (たまにはのんびり、ね, Occasionally Take it Easy, Okay?) | | 1:40 |
| 5. | "Happening?" | | 1:46 |
| 6. | "Haruka, Sora no Kanata Made" (遥か空の彼方まで, Far Away, Until the Ends of the Sky) | | 1:32 |
| 7. | "Shōsō" (焦燥, Frustration) | | 1:47 |
| 8. | "Raising Heart (#6~#7)" (レイジングハート（#6～#7） Reijingu Hāto (#6~#7)) | Donna Burke | 0:38 |
| 9. | "Bardiche (#6~#7)" (バルディッシュ（#6～#7） Barudishhu (#6~#7)) | Kevin J. England | 0:30 |
| 10. | "Graf Eisen (#6~#7)" (グラーフアイゼン（#6～#7） Gurāfu Aizen (#6~#7)) | Tetsuya Kakihara | 0:05 |
| 11. | "Laevatein (#6~#7)" (レヴァンティン（#6～#7） Revantian (#6~#7)) | Tetsuya Kakihara | 0:09 |
| 12. | "Yami no Sho (#6~#7)" (闇の書（#6～#7）, Book of Darkness (#6~#7)) | Alexandra Haefelin | 0:06 |
| Total length: | | | 13:21 |

Vol.4
| No. | Title | Performance | Length |
|---|---|---|---|
| 1. | "Kenen" (懸念, Concern) | | 1:49 |
| 2. | "Yaten no Aruji" (夜天の主, The Night Sky's Master) | | 1:33 |
| 3. | "Ryūsei" (流星, Falling Star) | | 1:15 |
| 4. | "Mugen no Kioku" (無限の記憶, Infitie Memories) | | 2:22 |
| 5. | "Taiji" (対峙, Confronting) | | 1:28 |
| 6. | "Omoi, Kono Mi ni Kometa Nara" (想い、この身に込めたなら, Feelings, If Absorbed Into These Eyes) | | 1:46 |
| 7. | "Kuroki Kakusei" (黒き覚醒 Black Awakening) | | 1:12 |
| 8. | "Raising Heart (#8~#9)" (レイジングハート（#8～#9） Reijingu Hāto (#8~#9)) | Donna Burke | 0:10 |
| 9. | "Bardiche (#8~#9)" (バルディッシュ（#8～#9） Barudishhu (#8~#9)) | Kevin J. England | 0:17 |
| 10. | "Graf Eisen (#8~#9)" (グラーフアイゼン（#8～#9） Gurāfu Aizen (#8~#9)) | Tetsuya Kakihara | 0:08 |
| 11. | "Yami no Sho (#8~#9)" (闇の書（#8～#9）, Book of Darkness (#8~#9)) | Alexandra Haefelin | 0:30 |
| Total length: | | | 12:38 |

Vol.5
| No. | Title | Performance | Length |
|---|---|---|---|
| 1. | "Shukumei no Ito" (宿命の糸, Thread of Fate) | | 1:53 |
| 2. | "Jūatsu" (重圧, Pressure) | | 1:52 |
| 3. | "Unmei" (運命, Destiny) | | 1:36 |
| 4. | "Zettai Taru Chikara" (絶対たる力, Unmistakably Sufficient Power) | | 2:10 |
| 5. | "Sakamaku Arashi" (逆巻く嵐 Surging Storm) | | 2:48 |
| 6. | "Namida no Imi, Negai no Yukue" (涙の意味、願いの行方 Tear's Meaning, The Wearabouts of a Wish) | | 2:28 |
| 7. | "Raising Heart (#10~#11)" (レイジングハート（#10～#11） Reijingu Hāto (#10~#11)) | Donna Burke | 1:10 |
| 8. | "Bardiche (#10~#11)" (バルディッシュ（#10～#11） Barudishhu (#10~#11)) | Kevin J. England | 1:04 |
| 9. | "Yami no Sho (#10~#11)" (闇の書（#10～#11）, Book of Darkness (#10~#11)) | Alexandra Haefelin | 0:58 |
| Total length: | | | 16:04 |

Vol.6
| No. | Title | Performance | Length |
|---|---|---|---|
| 1. | "Shiden Rekka Shippūjinrai" (市電烈火・疾風迅雷, Railway Conflagration, Lightning Fast Thunderclap) | | 1:37 |
| 2. | "Breakthrough Impact" | | 1:52 |
| 3. | "Aozora wo Negatte" (青空を願って Wishing to the Blue Sky) | | 1:47 |
| 4. | "Hikari, Afureta Nara" (光、溢れたなら Lights, If Overflowed) | | 2:19 |
| 5. | "Eyecatch A" (アイキャッチA) | | 0:08 |
| 6. | "Eyecatch B" (アイキャッチB) | | 0:09 |
| 7. | "Raising Heart (#12~#13)" (レイジングハート（#12～#13） Reijingu Hāto (#12~#13)) | Donna Burke | 0:31 |
| 8. | "Bardiche (#12~#13)" (バルディッシュ（#12～#13） Barudishhu (#12~#13)) | Kevin J. England | 0:16 |
| 9. | "Graf Eisen (#12~#13)" (グラーフアイゼン（#12～#13） Gurāfu Aizen (#12~#13)) | Tetsuya Kakihara | 0:05 |
| 10. | "Laevatein (#12~#13)" (レヴァンティン（#12～#13） Revantian (#12~#13)) | Tetsuya Kakihara | 0:09 |
| 11. | "Klarer Wind (#12~#13)" (クラールヴィント（#12～#13） Kurāru Vinto (#12~#13)) | Alexandra Haefelin | 0:04 |
| 12. | "Durandal (#12~#13)" (デュランダル（#12～#13） Dyurandaru (#12~#13)) | Thomas King | 0:13 |
| Total length: | | | 9:16 |

=== Magical Girl Lyrical Nanoha The Movie 2nd A's Original Soundtrack ===
The original soundtrack for Magical Girl Lyrical Nanoha The Movie 2nd A's was composed by Misa Chūjō and was released in two discs. King Records released the original soundtrack on July 14, 2012. It contains fifty-seven tracks and covers a duration of 1:55:55.

Track listing

Disc 1
| No. | Title | Music | Length |
|---|---|---|---|
| 1. | "Solitude" | | 2:03 |
| 2. | "Shukumei no Tobira" (宿命の扉, The Door of Destiny) | | 1:10 |
| 3. | "Yakusoku no Hi" (約束の日, The Promised Day) | | 2:24 |
| 4. | "Uminari Shi, 12-gatsu" (海鳴市・12月, Uminari City, December) | | 1:19 |
| 5. | "Harlaown-ke" (ハラオウン家, Haraoun-ke, The Harlaown House) | | 1:31 |
| 6. | "Jiken" (事件, Incident) | | 0:34 |
| 7. | "Chīsana Kokuhaku" (小さな告白, A Small Confession) | | 1:41 |
| 8. | "Kyūshū" (急襲, Assault) | | 3:31 |
| 9. | "Furuki Kishi" (旧き騎士, Ancient Knights) | | 2:16 |
| 10. | "An'un" (暗雲, Dark Clouds) | | 2:02 |
| 11. | "Yagami-ke no Asa" (八神家の朝, Morning at the Yagami House) | | 0:55 |
| 12. | "Shizuka na Ketsui" (静かな決意, Quiet Determination) | | 1:19 |
| 13. | "Yagami Hayate" (八神はやて, Hayate Yagami) | | 1:28 |
| 14. | "Fukutsu no Ishi (1)" (不屈の意志 (1), Indomitable Will (1)) | | 0:49 |
| 15. | "Fukutsu no Ishi (2)" (不屈の意志 (2), Indomitable Will (2)) | | 1:33 |
| 16. | "Tsuioku" (追憶, Recollection) | | 2:10 |
| 17. | "Raimei Rekka" (雷鳴烈火, Thunder Blazing) | | 1:35 |
| 18. | "Sōkyū no Hate Kara" (蒼穹の果てから, From the End of the Blue Sky) | | 1:21 |
| 19. | "Exelion Set Up!" (エクセリオン・セットアップ!, Ekuserion Settoappu!) | | 1:49 |
| 20. | "Lightning Assault" | | 2:00 |
| 21. | "Sky Dancing" | | 3:28 |
| 22. | "Kyūten" (急転, Sudden Change) | | 1:43 |
| 23. | "Kaisō ~Mezame no Toki~" (回想～目覚めの時～, Reminiscence ~Time of Awakening~) | | 2:41 |
| 24. | "Kaisō ~Kōfuku na Hibi~" (回想～幸福な日々～, Reminiscence ~Happy Days~) | | 2:20 |
| 25. | "ETERNAL BLAZE ~Instrumental & Orgol MIX~" | Noriyasu Agematsu | 6:40 |
| 26. | "Shinjitsu no Kusari" (真実の鎖, The Chain of Truth) | | 1:55 |
| 27. | "Kako to Genzai" (過去と現在, Past and Present) | | 3:29 |
| 28. | "Yami no Kodō" (闇の鼓動, The Beat of Darkness) | | 0:24 |
| 29. | "Itami Yori mo Nao" (痛みよりもなお, More Than Pain) | | 3:21 |
| 30. | "Kisareta Jijitsu" (記された事実, Inscribed Facts) | | 1:18 |
| Total length: | | | 60:48 |

Disc 2
| No. | Title | Lyrics | Music | Length |
|---|---|---|---|---|
| 1. | "Karamiau Unmei" (絡み合う運命, Intertwined Destinies) | | | 0:54 |
| 2. | "Egao no Shōjo-tachi" (笑顔の少女たち, The Girls' Smiles) | | | 0:50 |
| 3. | "Sōgū" (遭遇, Encounter) | | | 1:46 |
| 4. | "Tsunagaranai Kotoba" (繋がらない言葉, Unconnected Words) | | | 0:58 |
| 5. | "Chikai no Ken" (誓いの剣, The Sword of Oath) | | | 2:07 |
| 6. | "Buster Cannon" | | | 0:58 |
| 7. | "NachtWal" | | | 3:08 |
| 8. | "Yami no Sho no Ishi" (闇の書の意志, The Will of the Book of Darkness) | | | 2:23 |
| 9. | "Negatta Koto" (願ったこと, What I Wished For) | | | 0:45 |
| 10. | "Buster Shift" | | | 1:12 |
| 11. | "Hōkai" (崩壊, Collapse) | | | 2:59 |
| 12. | "Hoshikatta Jikan" (欲しかった時間, The Time I Longed For) | | | 4:08 |
| 13. | "Dog Fight" | | | 0:53 |
| 14. | "Namida Harau Chikara" (涙払う力, The Power to Wipe Away Tears) | | | 1:26 |
| 15. | "Tatoe Yume demo" (たとえ夢でも, It's Just a Dream) | | | 1:49 |
| 16. | "A.C.S." | | | 1:48 |
| 17. | "Dear My Sister Dear My Memory" | | | 4:36 |
| 18. | "Snow Rain ~Ver.Holy night~" (Performed by Hayate Yagami (Kana Ueda)) | Masaki Tsuzuki | happy soulman | 4:39 |
| 19. | "Shukufuku no Kaze" (祝福の風, Blessing Wind) | | | 1:39 |
| 20. | ""Okaeri"" (「おかえり」, "Welcome Back") | | | 0:33 |
| 21. | "Operation Standby" | | | 1:37 |
| 22. | "arc-en-ciel" | | | 0:52 |
| 23. | "Shūen" (終焉, Demise) | | | 1:02 |
| 24. | "Tatta Hitotsu no Hōhō" (たったひとつの方法, Only One Way) | | | 2:24 |
| 25. | "Eien no Kizuna" (永遠の絆, Eternal Bond) | | | 4:55 |
| 26. | "Spiritual Garden ~Instrumental & Strings MIX~" | | Masatomo Ōta | 3:26 |
| 27. | "Mirai e no Kizahashi" (未来へのきざはし, Stairs to the Future) | | | 1:20 |
| Total length: | | | | 55:07 |

== Magical Girl Lyrical Nanoha StrikerS ==
=== Secret Ambition ===
"Secret Ambition" is a maxi single by Nana Mizuki first released on April 18, 2007 by King Records bearing the catalog number KICM-1199. The lyrics, composition, and arrangement for the single are provided by Nana Mizuki, Chiyomaru Shikura, Hitoshi Fujima, Noriyasu Agematsu, Chisato Nishimura, and Shinya Saitō. The single contains six tracks in both regular and instrumental versions. Its A-side "Secret Ambition" is featured as the first opening theme in the anime television series Magical Girl Lyrical Nanoha StrikerS and is used for episodes one through seventeen. Its B-sides are titled "Heart-Shaped Chant" and "Level Hi!". It peak ranked 2nd on the Oricon singles chart and remained on the chart for nineteen weeks.

=== Hoshizora no Spica ===
"Hoshizora no Spica" (星空のSpica; lit. Spica of the Starry Sky) is a maxi single by Yukari Tamura first released on May 9, 2007 by King Records bearing the catalog number KICM-1210. The lyrics, composition, and arrangement for the single are provided by Karen Shiina, Noriyasu Agematsu, Mika Watanabe, Dux, and Hayato Tanaka. The single contains three tracks. Its A-side "Hoshizora no Spica" was featured as the first ending theme in the anime television series Magical Girl Lyrical Nanoha StrikerS and is used from episodes one through fourteen. Its B-sides are titled "Sensitive Venes" and "Melody". It peak ranked 7th on the Oricon singles chart and remained on the chart for nine weeks.

=== Massive Wonders ===
"Massive Wonders" is a maxi single by Nana Mizuki first released on August 22, 2007 by King Records bearing the catalog number KICM-1211. The lyrics, composition, and arrangement for the single are provided by Nana Mizuki, Toshirō Yabuki, Bee, Noriyasu Agematsu, and Hibiki. The single contains six tracks in both regular and instrumental versions. Its A-side "Massive Wonders" is featured as the second opening theme in the anime television series Magical Girl Lyrical Nanoha StrikerS and is used from episodes eighteen through twenty-six. Its B-side "Pray" is featured as an insert song in episode twenty-four of the same anime series. Its other B-side is titled "Happy Drive". It peak ranked 4th on the Oricon singles chart and remained on the chart for twelve weeks.

=== Beautiful Amulet ===
"Beautiful Amulet" is a maxi single by Tamura Yukari first released on August 1, 2007 by King Records bearing the catalog number KICM-1212. The lyrics, composition, and arrangement for the single are provided by Karen Shiina, Masatomo Ota, Yukiko Mitsui, Marhy, Dux, Miku Hazuki, Isozaki Takeshi, and Kazuya Komatsu. The single contains four tracks. Its A-side "Beautiful Amulet" is featured as the second ending theme in the anime television series Magical Girl Lyrical Nanoha StrikerS and is used from episodes fifteen to twenty-six. Its B-sides are titled "Niji Iro Ballon" (虹色バルーン, Niji Iro Barūn; lit. Rainbow-Colored Balloon) "Jelly Fish", and "Koi Suru Raspberry" (恋するラズベリー, Koi Suru Razuberī; lit. Fall-in-love Raspberry). It peak ranked 11th on the Oricon singles chart and remained on the chart for seven weeks.

=== Magical Girl Lyrical Nanoha StrikerS Original Soundtracks ===
The original soundtrack for the anime television series Magical Girl Lyrical Nanoha StrikerS was composed by Hiroaki Sano and was released across three soundtrack albums titled Magical Girl Lyrical Nanoha StrikerS Original Soundtrack Plus Vol.1~3. The three CDs were released between July 25, 2007 and March 26, 2008 alongside the first, fifth, and last of the nine DVD volumes that compile the anime's twenty-six episodes. In total, the three CDs contain seventy-eight tracks and cover a duration of 2:00:37. Each CD features tracks containing the background music used during the anime series.

Track listing

Vol.1
| No. | Title | Length |
|---|---|---|
| 1. | "Kidou Rokka – I" (機動六課-I, Special Duty Section 6 – I) | 2:04 |
| 2. | "Tokumu Rokka – II" (機動六課-II, Special Duty Section 6 – II) | 1:33 |
| 3. | "Yasuragi no Hitotoki" (安らぎのひととき, Moments of Comfort) | 1:54 |
| 4. | "Yūgure" (夕暮れ, Evening) | 2:02 |
| 5. | "Tokumu Rokka Shutsudō!" (機動六課 出動！, Special Duty Section 6 Departure!) | 1:49 |
| 6. | "Kore Mo Nichijō" (これも日常, This Is Also Everyday) | 1:37 |
| 7. | "Arere?" (あれれ？, Who?) | 1:54 |
| 8. | "Aozora ni Kakedashite" (青空に駆けだして, Run into the Blue Sky) | 1:38 |
| 9. | "Ima, Jibun ni Dekiru Koto" (いま、自分にできること, What I Can Do Now) | 2:29 |
| 10. | "Kodoku no Zanshō" (孤独の残照, Afterglow of Loneliness) | 1:57 |
| 11. | "Kienai Kizuato" (消えない傷痕, A Scar That Does Not Disappear) | 1:58 |
| 12. | "Yawaraka na Hizashi" (柔らかな日差し, Soft Sunshine) | 1:35 |
| 13. | "Taisetsu na Koto" (たいせつなこと, Important Thing) | 2:07 |
| 14. | "Heiwa Narebakoso" (平和なればこそ, If It Is Peaceful) | 1:45 |
| 15. | "Ryū Tamashī Shōkan" (竜魂召喚, Summon the Souls) | 2:26 |
| 16. | "Honobono Shimasho" (ほのぼのしましょ, Relax) | 1:34 |
| 17. | "Yami Yori no Te – I" (闇よりの手-I, Hand from Darkness – I) | 1:48 |
| 18. | "Kō no Sōsha ~Theme of Subaru~" (鋼の走者～Theme of Subaru～, Steel Runner ~Theme of Subaru~) | 1:39 |
| 19. | "Ryūsei no Shashu ~Theme of Tiana~" (流星の射手～Theme of Tiana～, Meteor Shooter ~Theme of Tiana~) | 1:41 |
| 20. | "Wakaki Yari Kishi ~Theme of Erio~" (若き槍騎士～Theme of Erio～, Young Spear Knight ~Theme of Erio~) | 1:50 |
| 21. | "Ryūki no Shōshi ~Theme of Caro~" (竜騎の召士～Theme of Caro～, Dragon Tamer ~Theme of Caro~) | 1:37 |
| 22. | "Raising Heart Set Up! (The Magical Orchestra) ~Theme of Nanoha & Raising Heart~" (レイジングハート・セットアップ！ (The Magical orchestra) ～Theme of NANOHA&Raising Heart～, Reijingu hāto setto appu! (The Magical orchestra) ～Theme of NANOHA&Raising Heart～) | 3:12 |
| 23. | "Kin no Senkō (ver Impulse) ~Theme of Fate & Bardiche~" (金の閃光 (Ver Impulse) ～Theme of Fate&Bardiche～, Blitz of Gold (ver Impulse) ~Theme of Fate & Bardiche~) | 1:43 |
| 24. | "Haruka Naru Ishi (Meister des Nachthimmeis) ~Theme of Hayate~" (遙かなる意志 (Meister des Nachthimmels) ～Theme of HAYATE～, The Will to Go Far (Master of the Night Sky) ~Theme of Hayate~) | 1:39 |
| 25. | "Eyecatch A" (アイキャッチA, Aikyatchi A) | 0:08 |
| 26. | "Eyecatch B" (アイキャッチB, Aikyatchi B) | 0:08 |
| 27. | "Eyecatch C" (アイキャッチC, Aikyatchi C) | 0:09 |
| Total length: | | 46:10 |

Vol.2
| No. | Title | Length |
|---|---|---|
| 1. | "Yami Yori no Te – II" (闇よりの手-II, Hand from Darkness – II) | 1:36 |
| 2. | "Senjutsu" (戦術, Tactics) | 1:39 |
| 3. | "Ko Fue" (孤笛, Lone Flute) | 1:40 |
| 4. | "Shōkan" (召喚, Summon) | 1:46 |
| 5. | "Inochi no Riyū" (命の理由, Reason for Life) | 1:51 |
| 6. | "Yasashisa ni Tsutsumarete" (優しさに包まれて, Being Enveloped by Kindness) | 2:25 |
| 7. | "Konna Toki wa" (こんな時は, When This Is the Case) | 1:54 |
| 8. | "Tempo Up!" (テンポアップ！, Tenpo appu!) | 1:36 |
| 9. | "Giwaku" (疑惑, Suspicion) | 2:16 |
| 10. | "Burai" (無頼, Unreasonable) | 1:53 |
| 11. | "Shizuka na Itami" (静かな痛み, Quiet Pain) | 2:13 |
| 12. | "Chīsana Ketsui" (小さな決意, A Small Determination) | 2:21 |
| 13. | "Kyūjitsu" (休日, Holiday) | 1:41 |
| 14. | "Itoshisa de Dakishimete" (愛しさで抱きしめて, Hug Me in Love) | 2:21 |
| 15. | "Ready Go!" | 1:47 |
| 16. | "Chase to Chase" | 1:55 |
| 17. | "Break Shot" | 2:56 |
| 18. | "Shūgeki" (襲撃, Attack) | 2:20 |
| 19. | "Hōkai no Jokyoku" (崩壊の序曲, Overture of the Collapse) | 2:24 |
| 20. | "Kuroi Yochō" (黒い予兆, A Dark Sign) | 1:50 |
| 21. | "Shooting Action" | 1:43 |
| 22. | "Ace of Ace" | 1:48 |
| 23. | "Subtitle A" (サブタイトルA, Sabutaitoru A) | 0:12 |
| 24. | "Subtitle B" (サブタイトルB, Sabutaitoru B) | 0:17 |
| 25. | "Subtitle C" (サブタイトルC, Sabutaitoru C) | 0:18 |
| Total length: | | 44:44 |

Vol.3
| No. | Title | Length |
|---|---|---|
| 1. | "Seikan" (静謐, Serene) | 4:08 |
| 2. | "Kizuna no Ito" (絆の糸, The Thread of Ties) | 1:34 |
| 3. | "Sakusō" (錯綜, Confusion) | 1:55 |
| 4. | "Mugen no Yokubō" (無限の欲望, Infinite Desire) | 1:56 |
| 5. | "Shūgeki-1" (襲撃－1, Attack-1) | 2:08 |
| 6. | "Shūgeki-2" (襲撃－2, Attack-2) | 2:07 |
| 7. | "Furuki Kishi" (古き騎士, Ancient Knights) | 1:44 |
| 8. | "Shirizokazu, Yuzurazu" (退かず、譲らず, Do Not Retreat, Do Not Yield) | 1:49 |
| 9. | "Kyoei" (巨影, Macroscopic) | 1:45 |
| 10. | "Yurikago" (ゆりかご, Cradle) | 2:30 |
| 11. | "Kurai Uzu" (昏い渦, Comedian) | 1:44 |
| 12. | "Eyecatch D" (アイキャッチD, Aikyatchi D) | 0:08 |
| 13. | "Eyecatch E" (アイキャッチE, Aikyatchi E) | 0:09 |
| 14. | "Gunblaze" | 1:49 |
| 15. | "Miageru Sora ga Tookute mo" (見上げる空が遠くても, Even If the Sky You Look Up Is Far Away) | 2:30 |
| 16. | "Uso ni Shinaide Kudasai" (嘘にしないでください, Please Do Not Lie) | 1:59 |
| 17. | "Tatoe Kono Karada ga Kudakete mo" (たとえこの身が砕けても, Even If This Body Crumbles) | 1:55 |
| 18. | "Fukashin no Akumu" (不可侵の悪夢, Inviolable Nightmare) | 2:07 |
| 19. | "Sono Namida mo, Kanashimi mo ~Tsudoe, Hoshi no Kagayaki Ver. StS~" (その涙も、哀しみも～集え、星の輝き Ver．StS～, Its Tears, Sorrows Are Gathered, Star Shine Ver. StS~) | 3:06 |
| 20. | "Yūki no Imi" (勇気の意味, Meaning of Courage) | 2:16 |
| 21. | "Tsukamitotta Shōri" (掴みとった勝利, Grabbed Victory) | 1:12 |
| 22. | "Kono Hiroi Sekai ni (StS Arrange)" (この広い世界に(StS Arrange), In This Broad World (StS Arrange)) | 2:27 |
| 23. | "Kimi ni Aitaku Natta Nara (StS Arrange)" (君に会いたくなったなら(StS Arrange), If You Want to See Me (StS Arrange)) | 1:40 |
| 24. | "Yume Mita Mirai, Yume Miru Genjitsu (StS Arrange)" (夢見た未来 夢見る現実(StS Arrange), Dreaming the Future, Dreaming Reality (StS Arrange)) | 1:51 |
| 25. | "Yasuragi (StS Arrange)" (やすらぎ(StS Arrange), Peace (StS Arrange)) | 2:10 |
| 26. | "The StrikerS" | 1:51 |
| Total length: | | 50:45 |

== Compilation albums ==
=== Magical Girl Lyrical Nanoha A's Sound Stage Vocal Best Collection ===
Magical Girl Lyrical Nanoha A's Sound Stage Vocal Best Collection (魔法少女リリカルなのはA's サウンドステージボーカルベストコレクション, Mahō Shōjo Lyrical Nanoha A's Saundo Steeji Bookaru Besuto Korekushon) is a compilation album compiling tracks composed by Hiroaki Sano for the two anime series Magical Girl Lyrical Nanoha and Magical Girl Lyrical Nanoha A's. It was sold exclusively during August 2006 at Comiket 70. It contains twelve tracks.

Track listing
| No. | Title | Original Album | Length |
|---|---|---|---|
| 1. | "Raising Heart Set Up!" (レイジングハート・セットアップ！, Reijingu Hāto Setto Aippu!) | Magical Girl Lyrical Nanoha Original Soundtrack | 0:00 |
| 2. | "Flying High! (Lyrical Pop Style)" | Magical Girl Lyrical Nanoha Sound Stage 01 | 0:00 |
| 3. | "Egao ni Naare (Sweet Mix)" (笑顔になあれ (Sweet mix), Become a Smile) | Magical Girl Lyrical Nanoha Sound Stage 03 | 0:00 |
| 4. | "Brave Hearts (Cyber Mix)" | Magical Girl Lyrical Nanoha A's Sound Stage 01 | 0:00 |
| 5. | "Starting Stars (Starlight Mix)" | Magical Girl Lyrical Nanoha A's Sound Stage 03 | 0:00 |
| 6. | "Tsubasa (Heartful Mix)" (翼 (Heartful mix)) | Magical Girl Lyrical Nanoha A's Sound Stage 02 | 0:00 |
| 7. | "Skyblue Gradation (Summertime Edit)" | Magical Girl Lyrical Nanoha Sound Stage 03 | 0:00 |
| 8. | "Kaze ni Mau Hana (Flower Mix)" (風に舞う花 (Flower mix), Flower Dancing in the Wind (Flower Mix)) | Magical Girl Lyrical Nanoha A's Sound Stage 03 | 0:00 |
| 9. | "Wish (Memories Mix)" | Magical Girl Lyrical Nanoha Sound Stage 02 | 0:00 |
| 10. | "Itoshisa to Yasashisa to (Piano Edit)" (愛しさと優しさと (Piano edit), Love and Kindness) | Magical Girl Lyrical Nanoha Sound Stage 01 | 0:00 |
| 11. | "Anata ga Kureta Sora (Windy Style)" (あなたがくれた空 (Windy style), The Sky You Gave Me) | Magical Girl Lyrical Nanoha A's Sound Stage 03 | 0:00 |
| 12. | "Snow Rain (Another Approach)" | Magical Girl Lyrical Nanoha A's Sound Stage 02 | 0:00 |

=== Magical Girl Lyrical Nanoha StrikerS Sound Stage Vocal Best Collection ===
Magical Girl Lyrical Nanoha StrikerS Sound Stage Vocal Best Collection (魔法少女リリカルなのはStrikerS サウンドステージボーカルベストコレクション, Mahō Shōjo Lyrical Nanoha StrikerS Saundo Steeji Bookaru Besuto Korekushon) is a compilation album first released on March 4, 2009 by King Records bearing the catalog number KICA-966. The album contains twelve tracks. It compiles the "best" tracks that feature vocal performance contained within the four drama CDs released for the anime series Magical Girl Lyrical Nanoha StrikerS titled Magical Girl Lyrical Nanoha StrikerS Sound Stage 01~04. It peak ranked 40th on the Oricon albums chart and remained on the chart for four weeks.

Track listing
| No. | Title | Original Album | Length |
|---|---|---|---|
| 1. | "Mahō no Kotoba (Lyrical Harmony)" (魔法の言葉～Lyrical harmony～, Words of Magic (Lyrical Harmony)) | Magical Girl Lyrical Nanoha StrikerS Sound Stage 01 | 0:00 |
| 2. | "Present" | Magical Girl Lyrical Nanoha StrikerS Sound Stage 02 | 0:00 |
| 3. | "Sora Iro no Yakusoku" (空色の約束, Empty-Colored Promise) | Magical Girl Lyrical Nanoha StrikerS Sound Stage 01 | 0:00 |
| 4. | "Futari no Tsubasa" (2人の翼, The Pair's Wings) | Magical Girl Lyrical Nanoha StrikerS Sound Stage 02 | 0:00 |
| 5. | "Hoshi ni Inori o" (星に祈りを, Sing a Song to the Stars) | Magical Girl Lyrical Nanoha StrikerS Sound Stage 01 | 0:00 |
| 6. | "Itsunohika" (いつの日にか, One of These Days) | Magical Girl Lyrical Nanoha StrikerS Sound Stage 02 | 0:00 |
| 7. | "Endless Chain" | Magical Girl Lyrical Nanoha StrikerS Sound Stage 04 | 0:00 |
| 8. | "Anata no Egao ni" (あなたの笑顔に, In Your Smile) | Magical Girl Lyrical Nanoha StrikerS Sound Stage 02 | 0:00 |
| 9. | "Shikō no Hana" (真紅の花, Crimson Flower) | Magical Girl Lyrical Nanoha StrikerS Sound Stage 04 | 0:00 |
| 10. | "Anata o Omou" (あなたを想う, Thinking of You) | Magical Girl Lyrical Nanoha StrikerS Sound Stage 03 | 0:00 |
| 11. | "Chiisana Chikai" (小さな誓い, A Small Oath) | Magical Girl Lyrical Nanoha StrikerS Sound Stage 03 | 0:00 |
| 12. | "To The Real" | Magical Girl Lyrical Nanoha StrikerS Sound Stage 04 | 0:00 |

=== Magical Girl Lyrical Nanoha StrikerS Original Soundtrack Plus LPIII SA ===
Track listing
| No. | Title | Length |
|---|---|---|
| 1. | "Theme of Nanoha & Raising Heart (The Magical orchestra)" | 3:10 |
| 2. | "Theme of Fate & Bardiche (Ver Impulse)" | 1:42 |
| 3. | "Theme of Hayate (Meister des Nachthimmels)" | 1:36 |
| Total length: | | 6:28 |
