= Ultimate Diamond =

ULTIMATE DIAMOND

Studio album by Nana Mizuki
- Released: 3 June 2009
- Genre: J-pop, pop rock, jazz, Eurobeat
- Length: 65:26
- Label: King Records

Nana Mizuki chronology
Great Activity (2007)	ULTIMATE DIAMOND (2009)	Impact Exciter (2010)

Regular Edition

Singles from Ultimate Diamond
- 1. "Starcamp EP" Released: February 6, 2008; 2. "Trickster" Released: October 1, 2008; 3. "Shin'ai" Released: January 21, 2009

Ultimate Diamond is the seventh studio album released by Japanese voice actress and pop singer Nana Mizuki on June 3, 2009. It was released in two editions: a CD only edition and a limited CD+DVD edition.

The first press of the album has a 44-page booklet. A limited CD+DVD edition of the album included a DVD of a concert at the Shinjuku Koma Theater on October 11, 2008. At the concert, she covered two enka songs: Fuyumi Sakamoto's "Yozakura Oshichi" and Mitsuko Nakamura's "Kawachi Otoko Bushi". The limited DVD included the two songs.

The album reached number 1 in Japan's Oricon weekly albums charts for the week of June 15, 2009, and became the first album from a voice actress to accomplish that feat since the creation of Oricon.

== Track listing ==
1. Maria & Joker
  - Lyrics: Hibiki
  - Composition, arrangement: Noriyasu Agematsu (Elements Garden)
2. Etsuraku Camellia (悦楽カメリア)
  - Lyrics: Nana Mizuki
  - Composition, arrangement: Shogo Ohnishi
3. Perfect Smile
  - Lyrics, composition, arrangement: Hiroyuki Ito
4. Trickster
  - Lyrics: Nana Mizuki
  - Composition, arrangement: Noriyasu Agematsu (Elements Garden)
5. Mr.Bunny!
  - Lyrics: Sayuri
  - Composition: Mitsuru Wakabayashi
  - Arrangement: Shinya Saitou
6. Chinmoku no Kajitsu (沈黙の果実)
  - Lyrics, composition: Shihori
  - Arrangement: Renka Amou
7. Brand New Tops
  - Lyrics: Yūmao
  - Composition, arrangement: Tomoya Miyabi
8. Shounen (少年)
  - Lyrics, composition: Toshirou Yabuki
  - Arrangement: Toshirou Yabuki, Tsutomu Ouhira
9. Gimmick Game
  - Lyrics: Hibiki
  - Composition, arrangement: Junpei Fujita (Elements Garden)
10. Dancing in the Velvet Moon
  - Lyrics: Nana Mizuki
  - Composition: Noriyasu Agematsu (Elements Garden)
  - Arrangement: Noriyasu Agematsu, Masato Nakayama (Elements Garden)
11. Ray of change
  - Lyrics, composition: Kazunori Saita
  - Arrangement: Kouichiro Takahashi
12. Shin'ai (深愛)
  - Lyrics: Nana Mizuki
  - Composition: Noriyasu Agematsu (Elements Garden)
  - Arrangement: Hitoshi Fujima (Elements Garden)
13. Aoki Hikari no Hate -Ultimate Mode- (蒼き光の果て-ULTIMATE MODE-)
  - Lyrics: Junko Tsuji
  - Composition: Shunsuke Matsui
  - Arrangement: Hitoshi Fujima (Elements Garden)
14. Astrogation
  - Lyrics: Hibiki
  - Composition, arrangement: Jun Suyama
15. Yume no Tsuzuki (夢の続き)
  - Lyrics, composition: Nana Mizuki
  - Arrangement: Junpei Fujita (Elements Garden)

== Charts ==
Chart	Peak position	Sales
Oricon Weekly Albums	1	104,902
