= Super Robot Wars OG Saga: Endless Frontier =

2008 video game

Super Robot Taisen OG Saga: Endless Frontier
- Developer: Monolith Soft
- Publishers: JP: Bandai Namco Games (Note: Released under the Banpresto brand name.); NA: Atlus
- Director: Soichiro Morizumi
- Producer: Koji Ishitani
- Writer: Soichiro Morizumi
- Composer: Salamander Factory
- Series: Super Robot Wars
- Release: JP: May 29, 2008; NA: April 28, 2009
- Genre: Role-playing video game
- Mode: Single-player

Super Robot Taisen OG Saga: Endless Frontier (無限のフロンティア スーパーロボット大戦OGサーガ, lit Endless Frontier: Super Robot Wars OG Saga) is a video game developed by Monolith Soft and published by Namco Bandai Games. It is a spin-off of the Super Robot Taisen: Original Generation series. Released on May 29, 2008 on the Nintendo DS, the title departs from the traditional tactical role-playing game elements for which the Super Robot Wars franchise is known and opts for turn-based role-playing gameplay instead.

A drama CD, where events in the extra scenarios of Super Robot Taisen: Original Generation 2 in Super Robot Wars: Original Generations are revealed, was given as a bonus gift to consumers who pre-ordered the game in Japan. On February 26, 2008, a manga series based on Mugen no Frontier began serialization in the fourth volume of the Kerokero Ace magazine.

The game was later published by Atlus in North America on April 28, 2009, with a premium boxed release, with a bonus soundtrack CD featuring music from the game. A sequel, Endless Frontier Exceed, released for the DS in Japan in 2010.

== Features ==
Endless Frontier features multiple worlds with combat taking place on foot. Aside from the playable characters in the game, mecha, many of them similar to the ones from the Original Generation games, are controllable by the player's actions and issuing of commands. The battle system is similar to that of Namco × Capcom (another game developed by Monolith Soft), in that attack commands during battle are issued via timed button presses, rather than through the menu system typical of the role-playing genre. The player can chain these attacks together to execute long attack combinations while issuing a new set of commands, such as support from characters placed in the "back row". The mecha featured in this game are much smaller than the ones in the Super Robot Wars series, appearing at around 3 meters tall.

Despite its status as an "Original Generation" title the game also features several characters from other series, mainly Namco × Capcom and Xenosaga. Endless Frontier's Japanese theme song "Butterfly" is performed by girl-group Perfume and is featured on their album Game.

Like its Japanese import, Atlus USA has stated gamers who have a copy of Super Robot Taisen: Original Generation or Super Robot Taisen: Original Generation 2 for the Game Boy Advance can obtain items in the localized version of Endless Frontier by inserting the game cartridge into the DS's SLOT 2 upon starting a new game.

== Plot ==
The game begins with an introduction to the Endless Frontier, explaining a brief history of the world and the crossgates. The game opens up with Haken Browning and Aschen Brödel outside of the Mai Tierra, they enter and explore what remains of the ruins, with debris being cleared away with Haken's Night Fowl, until they come across a large security locked doorway. Haken becomes nostalgic as he remembers that it had been 23 years since he had last been there, after a brief talk with Aschen he orders her to open the door. Unfortunately the password mechanism proves to be too complex for Aschen to hack so she asks Haken to use her "password cracking subprogram". He reluctantly agrees, and it is revealed that it was an overdrive mode that gives her a tremendous power boost, but also creates a personality split from a stern and stoic young woman to a hyperactive teen. Using her new strength, she literally tears down the door and they proceed onwards.

Upon reaching a deeper part of the ship they found that the defenses of the ship had been activated, battling through the defense droids they come across a second door, this time too powerful to break down. Exploring what they could, they stumble upon a young girl sleeping in a bed in one of the rooms. Upon waking up, she introduces herself as Kaguya Nanbu from Kagura Amahara, their neighbor world. It is found out that she is in fact a princess of the Nanbu Clan with a bounty on her to anyone who brings her back. As bounty hunters; Haken naturally decides to escort Kaguya home for money, and with a key card Kaguya found they proceed through the previously unpassable door. Continuing further they eventually come across two battle droids, far superior to the ones they faced along the way, but manage to destroy them. Unable to proceed through the next door, they return to the Zeit Krokodil and meet the vice-captain Lee, a weretiger, and the half elf mechanic Marion. After the greeting, and being warned to look out for the Phantom (or Black Specter), they leave to collect Kaguya's bounty.

On their way, briefly passing over an unstable Crossgate, they enter the city Trodel Stadt and meet John Moses, Haken's father, where it is revealed they are not related by blood and Haken is ordered to investigate the Mild Keil crystals, an otherworldly energy created substance that didn't originate from any of the worlds in the Endless Frontier. Leaving the town, they travel into the Schlafen Celeste, an inactive ship with numerous teleportation pods, which is revealed to be infested with Mild Keil crystals. Continuing on they come across a strange android and pursue her only to encounter three Goblins that were transported into the Schlafen Celeste. Slaying the goblins and losing the android they continue to the crossgate into Kagura Amahara.

Upon arriving, they immediately travel to the capital of Kagura Amahara; Takatori Castle. After stopping at Shirou's, a friend of Haken's, shop they are greeted by Sanuki Nanbu. Although ready to drop Kaguya back Haken and Aschen find that she was missing. Sanuki however is unconcerned and tells them that she is probably at Fujisakura Altar. However Haken notes how suspicious it was that they are paying to bring Kaguya back when she is supposed to be on a pilgrimage journey causing Sanuki to admit that their land were having trouble with Mild Keil crystals, the Phantom and the Shiki-Oni of the east in Megi Castle. Haken and Aschen quickly find Kaguya at the altar, which is apparently Kaguya's mother, and Kaguya promises to introduce them to Suzuka, princess of the Shiki-Oni and a friend of hers from Megi Castle for their services. However she finds out that Megi Castle has become dangerous and becomes determined to see whether Suzuka was alright. Haken, under the guise of hunting the Phantom, decides to escort her along the way and the three of them leave towards Megi Castle.

At Megi Castle they are surprised to find that it is filled with Mild Keil crystals. Fighting their way through rampant Shiki-Oni they find Suzuka and her fiancé Shuten arguing in the west hall, from the snatches of conversation it is revealed that it was Shuten that filled the castle with Mild Keil and he was planning to use the crystals to strengthen the Shiki-Oni. Shuten leaves and Suzuka, after some persuasion from Kaguya, reluctantly agrees to lead Haken and Aschen after Shuten through the north gate. However they find their way blocked by Koma, a catgirl bodyguard hired by Shuten to stop anyone from going through the north gate, and two strange creatures with the same energy signatures as the Mild Keil. After defeating them, though Koma manages to escape, they find their way barred by a barricade of Mild Keil crystals. Unable to move further they decide to seek out Otone, Kaguya's master and leader of the Ura Genbu elite ninja's, for more information on the Mild Keil and the Phantom while Suzuka, despite some reservations, joins the team along with her personal mech; The Jyaki-GUN-Oh.

Traveling north, they find Otone at the headquarters of the Ura Genbu on Ryugu Island where it is revealed that they were guarding the Crossgate to Elfetale. They find out that no one had been able to contact Elfetale for some time and all reconnaissance teams haven't returned from the Crossgate, it is also revealed that the Phantom had passed through to Elfetale only two days ago. With their goal clear, Haken and Aschen say their goodbyes to Kaguya and Suzuka and prepare to follow the Phantom. Just as they were about to leave however, Suzuka and Kaguya chase after them, Kaguya to complete her pilgrimage journey and Suzuka to investigate the Mild Keil crystals. With the two princesses in tow, the group moves on to Elfetale. Meanwhile, Otone, after receiving a report on Kaguya and Suzuka, decides to leave them be, but orders a ninja team to track them and keep an eye on them.

Upon arriving, the team immediately travel south to Castle Espina. They are shocked however, to find that it was completely overtaken by Mild Keil crystals. Further investigations find that there was no survivors in the castle. While they were still in the castle the team are startled to find a sudden growth of Mild Keil crystals blocking their path back to Kagura Amahura, leaving them stranded in Elfetale and they immediately realize the crystals were coming from Elfetale. Following the advice of Koma, who followed them, they are forced to travel to Mirabilis Castle in the hopes there may be a crossgate inside they could use.

Entering and avoiding the traps set inside the castle, they quickly come across a small girl named Kyon Feulion, a member of the Orchestral army which instigated the Ten year war. After a quick conversation Kyon attacks them in a rage only to be defeated but promptly makes her escape. Continuing further they come across someone named Saya who claims that two members of the Orchestral Army are after her, naturally sparking Haken's interest. Going on they meet a man named Reiji Arisu and a fox woman simply known as Xiaomu who were pursuing Saya. Haken and his team promptly attack and defeat them only for them to find out that they were not members of the Orchestral Army after all and that they too were trying to find a way back to their own world. Banding together, the team travels deeper into the castle only to run into an android named Cardia Basirissa who is revealed to have connections to the Mai Tierra and Aschen. After refusing to reveal any information she tries to terminate everyone but is beaten and forced to flee but not before dropping a key card. However, at the end of the castle they find that the crossgate was unstable and unusable and are forced to go back to Espina Castle.

At Espina Castle, the team is made aware that Saya had escaped east and pursue her, believing her path was blocked by debris. However, they find that the debris had been cut open with a powerful beam based weapon and they continue inside. Inside the structure they come across the Serena Pirates who they briefly fight against before continuing on. Just before exiting to southern Elfetale they encounter the Phantom and after a furious fight, escapes them.

== Characters and mecha ==
=== Protagonists ===
==== Original ====
Four new original characters, many of them bearing references to specifically created characters by Banpresto, take the leading roles. The original characters are all based on Japanese/European fairy tales.

- Haken Browning
  - Voice Actor: Nobuyuki Hiyama
  - The male protagonist of Endless Frontier, 23-year-old Haken (which is German for hook) Browning is a cool, chivalrous, yet slightly perverted (though it is implied that this is because of his foster father's influence as his father is shown acting in a similar manner) bounty hunter from Lost Herencia who wields the Night Fowl customized rifle with a built-in partisan-like attachment and a long-barreled handgun called the Longtomb Special. He was originally found by Moses on the Mai Tierra being cradled by Aschen Brödel and they are both adopted by him, upon growing up he takes over Moses's job of managing the ship Zeit Krokodil (Time Crocodile in German), serving as its captain and is noted to be similar to his Moses in many ways including their penchant for reckless almost insane plans. His moveset enlists the use of several explosive cards in a technique called Best Flush. His motif is from Peter Pan where his character is based on Captain Hook, along with a poker motif for his attacks.
- Kaguya Nanbu
  - Voice Actress: Yukana
  - One of three female protagonists, 18-year-old Kaguya Nanbu from the nation of Kagura Amahara is a princess of the royal Nanbu Clan. The daughter of Emperor Sanuki Nanbu, she is on a pilgrimage that every female in the family bloodline must take when they come of age. Her large breasts are the subject of many jokes throughout the game and have been estimated to be at 100 cm by Aschen Brödel. She occasionally reprimands Haken when he starts flirting too much (partly because of jealousy). She is a master of the Jinraku Tengen style of kenjutsu and wields the Goushiki Zankantō, a single-edged longsword. She also styles herself as The Sword That Cleaves Evil. Throughout the story there are strong hints that Kaguya is romantically attracted to Haken Browning. Her motif is based on The Tale of the Bamboo Cutter and her name is fittingly named after the same character in the story.
- Aschen Brödel
  - Voice Actress: Kaori Shimizu
  - The second of three female protagonists, 'Aschen Brödel' (German name for Cinderella /Aschenbrödel, Aschenputtel) is the android subordinate to Haken, possessing an occasional personality split between a stoic, reserved android and a cheerful, upbeat woman, done by activating "Code DTD" (Dust-to-Dust) or whenever her body temperature rises high enough, which also results in the green portions of her uniform temporarily dissolving, exposing her legs and bust to comical effect, which makes Haken uncomfortable as he tips his hat over his eyes the first time this is seen in the storyline and she is usually the one who scolds Haken on his flirting. She has been alongside Haken for 23 years since birth, but cannot recall her memories prior to that and has "mothered" Haken since he was a baby. With the appearance of a 20-year-old, her primary style of combat consists of striking attacks, but she is also able to utilize a variety of armaments located inside her mechanical body. Her motif is based on Cinderella, (Aschenbrodel is the German name for Cinderella) as the shotgun blast from her heel is called "Glass Heel".
- Suzuka-Hime (Princess Suzuka)
  - Voice Actress: Mamiko Noto
  - The last of the three female protagonists, Suzuka is the princess/priestess of the "Shiki-Oni", a tribe of oni residing in Kagura Amahara, known for their summoning rituals. Taking the appearance of a 14- to 15-year-old though is believed to be over 100 years old, she travels to find the reason behind the sudden appearance and rapid growth of "Mild Keil" crystals in the Shiki-Oni's Megi Castle. Suzuka is also Kaguya's childhood friend and dual wields a pair of fans. During combat, she primarily battles by calling upon the help of the Jyaki-GUN-Oh, one of the mecha featured in the game who she controls like a puppet using wires attached to her fans through dance moves. She is also capable of using her fans and wires as striking weapons. She harbors an interest in androids and mechanical beings. She and Aschen develop something of a rivalry, with the two frequently insulting or challenging each other, leaving Haken and Kaguya to try to break up their fights. Her character's motif is based on Suzuka Gozen (鈴鹿御前, Suzuka Gozen) who is a legendary figure prominent in Japanese folktales of the Kamakura period.

==== Crossover ====
These characters have appeared in other media developed by Monolith Soft.

- Reiji Arisu
  - Voice Actor: Kazuhiko Inoue
  - The male protagonist of Namco x Capcom, Reiji serves as an agent alongside his partner Xiaomu for the Shinra organization on Earth. He fights with a fire-based katana "Karin", a lightning-enhanced wakizashi "Chirai", a revolver called "Gold" and a shotgun named "Hollywood", all placed in a customized, handheld weapon rack. He occasionally grows frustrated at Xiaomu's happy-go-lucky attitude and sometimes threatens to spank her if her teasing gets out of hand. He and Xiaomu had originally been tracking Saya after they were thrown into the Endless Frontier but were attacked by Haken and his group due to their clothes being similar to the ones worn by the Orchestral Army. After their scuffle the two teams quickly resolve their problems and band together because of their common goals. Despite being an original character, his BGM Arisu in the Flux City and his arrival here is similar to plot of Alice in Wonderland where Reiji and Xiaomu found themselves trapped inside a brand new world.
- Xiaomu
  - Voice Actress: Omi Minami
  - The female protagonist of Namco × Capcom, Xiaomu is a cheerful, flirtatious 765-year-old "Sage Fox" assisting Reiji in his agent duties, because of her age she is sometimes called old. She also fights with handguns ("Silver" and "Platinum"), but carries an ice-based, elemental cane sword called the "Suiren" and can perform assorted magic as well as being able to team up with Reiji to unleash a series of double attacks.
- KOS-MOS
  - Voice Actress: Mariko Suzuki
  - KOS-MOS is one of the major characters in the Xenosaga series. Her design for this game is based on her Version 4 character design from Xenosaga Episode III: Also sprach Zarathustra. Her pod was transported to the Endless Frontier shortly before her final checks before her official activation, and was accidentally awakened when the team stumbled upon her pod. After activating she joins Haken and his team, both to hunt down T-elos and find a way to return to the future. She is generally reserved and calm in most situations as well as being able to manifest a variety of different weapons from her body, including Machine Guns, Pistols and Energy Swords. After defeating the Einst, KOS-MOS, Reiji, and Xiaomu are presumably warped back to their worlds.

=== Supporting characters ===
- John Moses
  - The former captain of the Zeit Krokodil and former "wandering bounty hunter", sometimes referred to as Father John. He passed both these titles to Haken Browning, his adopted son he found 23 years ago as a baby aboard the Mai Tierra. He is the representative of Trodel Stadt and is the leader of Lost Herencia and was formerly considered the most famous bounty hunter in the Endless Frontier. He is at least 53 years old. Compared to Haken, Moses is a more serious character, though also having a perverted streak, and was apparently stricter while he was the captain, but having the same penchant as Haken for dare-devil plans. Despite Haken's past, he still considers Haken to be his son.
- Lee
  - An anthropomorphic tiger and the vice-captain of the Zeit Krokodil when John Moses was and while Haken Browning is the captain. Before meeting John Moses, he was a bounty hunter, little more than a bandit according to himself, and was an acquaintance of Rubor Cucullus. Haken, apparently, sometimes brings him "live meat" as food (i.e. enemies he defeated) though this isn't verified whether he actually eats them or if it is a joke on his part. He is apparently a powerful fighter, though never seen fighting in the series, as Rubor Cucullus is shown to be wary of him. One of his attacks is called the "Vicious Tiger Elbow".
- Marion Sumii
  - She is a half elf and half human and is the mechanic that maintains the Zeit Krokodil. Due to her mixed heritage, her age is uncertain, though she appears as a woman in her early thirties, according to Aschen however, she is apparently "old". She is the mechanic on the Zeit Krokodil and is shown to be a bit of a machine maniac ("mad scientist" according to Lee and "pure evil to any robots around" according to Aschen), with an urge to disassemble any new machine she can get her eyes (and hands) on. Despite this, she is not a fighter.
- Sanuki Nanbu
  - King and ruler of Kagura Amahara, he is the father of Kaguya Nanbu. He apparently knows Haken's father, John Moses (even referring to Haken as "The man taking John Moses's place as the top hunter in the worlds") and is also slightly lecherous (recognising his daughter, Kaguya due to her curvaceous and voluptuous figure much to her chagrin and asks Suzuka to teach her "special dance" to Kaguya). He is considered a wise leader by his people and is saddened by the loss of his wife, who gave her life to seal off the Crossgates. He trusts his daughter very much and accepts her decision to fight against the Einst rather than seal away the crossgates despite the arguably low success rate.
- Shirou
  - An anthropomorphic wolf and a shopkeeper in Kagura Amahara. He is a friend of Haken and apparently Kaguya as well (she refers to him as her favourite shopkeeper). He has an intense dislike of Koma, a cat merchant, willing to attack someone simply for mentioning her and claiming that she has no appreciation for customers (which turns out to be true). He is the one that later briefs Haken and the group on the lockdown in Kagura Amahara initiated by the Ura Genbu ninja's. He is apparently a capable fighter, though never seen in battle, one of his moves is known as the "Ultimate Sakura Fang Strike".

=== Antagonists ===
==== Original ====
- Shuten
  - Voice Actor: Tetsu Inada
  - Shuten is a muscular, male Shiki-Oni, said to be the fiancée of Suzuka. He believes that the Shiki-Oni's have become subservient to the humans and, as a consequence, he is seeking a way to restore the Shiki-Oni to their full power and will do anything to ensure their tribe's stability, going so far as to side with the Einst despite already being brainwashed by them once. He ultimately sees the error of his ways and cheerfully accepts his defeat and promising to give up on defeating the humans. In battle Shuten primarily relies on using a large spear and his incredible physical strength to overwhelm his enemies, during battle he can also call down a bolt of thunder to strike down his foes. He may be named after Shuten-dōji.
- Katze Kotolnos
  - Voice Actor: Ryotaro Okiayu
  - Katze is an anthropomorphic feline character and the chief of "Dunopolis", a town built on a colossal tank named the Grand Marquis shaped like a cat in the desert region of Southern Elfetale. Very knowledgeable about history, according to him, during the "Ten Year War" between Elfetale and Formido Heim, he was a death merchant, selling arms to both sides of the conflict and is later revealed to have been a high-ranking member of the Orchestral army. Nevertheless, he regrets fighting in the war and builds Dunopolis as his way to make up for everything, he has kept tabs on Haken and his group and believes they are the key to stopping the Einst once and for all. Due to his time in war Katze is a proficient fighter who uses a kick style kenpo and high speed movement to get the edge in battle, at one point holding off the entire cast of protagonists by himself. His motif is from Puss in Boots.
- Cardia Basirissa
  - Voice Actress: Mariko Suzuki
  - Cardia is a pink female android, who reveals herself as "W06", the predecessor to "W16" (Echidna Issaki from Super Robot Taisen: Original Generation 2). It is in her interests to preserve the information and secrets aboard the "Mai Tierra" battleship, a vessel that mysteriously crashed into Lost Herencia 23 years ago and terminates anyone who finds out too much information, she is also trying to regain her lost memory like Aschen. Because of her status as an android, she is incredibly resilient to damage and fights using several blades hidden throughout her body as both ranged and melee attacks. Her motif is based on the Queen of Hearts as she makes her first appearance to the main cast for the first time in the Elftale Castle.
- Otone
  - Voice Actress: Sayaka Ohara
  - Dressed in the style of a Japanese kunoichi, Otone is the young leader of the Ura Genbu ninjas in Kagura Amahara charged with the protection of the Nanbu Clan, as well as being Kaguya's master. Despite this it appears as though she cares more about Kaguya then the Nanbu Clan as when she confronts Haken and his group, and despite orders by King Nanbu to return Kaguya at any cost she allows them to leave as she does not want Kaguya to make the same sacrifice as her mother, she is later brainwashed by an Einst copy of Kaguya but is freed when she is defeated by the real Kaguya. In battle Otone uses several razor sharp, virtually invisible wires for battle but also carries a variety of bladed kunai knives and considerable skill in ninjutsu. Her motif is based on Otohime, where the town where she resides is similar to a turtle.
- Ezel Granada
  - Voice Actor: Tetsu Inada
  - Ezel is a mysterious man with the head of a horned skull. Hailing from the chaotic world of Formido Heim, he leads a group named the "Orchestral Army", an elite battalion once part of the frontlines of Formido Heim during the "Ten Year War". Although he looks menacing, he is actually a noble soldier at heart and is the one who revealed the Einst to be the ones behind the 10-year war which Ezel stops by killing the Einst impersonating their king, however they had already suffered massive casualties by then (he and Katze were the only surviving members of the original Orchestral Army) and since then he had worked at a solution to prevent the Einst from returning to the Endless Frontier, ultimately he trusts this task to Haken Browning. In battle he uses a large Battle-Axe, which he wields one handed, and enhances his already formidable skills with a variety of explosion based attacks. Like the rest of the Ochestral Army, his motif is based on the Town Musicians of Bremen and Ezel is German for donkey.
- Henne Valkyria
  - Voice Actress: Natsuko Kuwatani
  - A serious winged female knight, Henne is one of two new members of Ezel's "Orchestral Army" and appears to be a high-ranking member. Unlike the cheerful, smart mouth, pessimistic and insulting Kyon, she is very professional and mature about her job and is a far more competent leader. After the Endless Frontier fused together Henne Valkyria was forced to work more and more to make up for the war and later makes Aschen and Otone an offer to join the Orchestral army. During battle she fights using a laser sabre while using her natural flight ability to aid in battle, she carries some sort of teleportation device on her and her feathers can also be launched as projectile attacks, she can also rapidly spin to create a localised red tornado around herself to ram and blow away enemies. Like the rest of the Ochestral Army, her motif is based on the Town Musicians of Bremen with her name being German for hen.
- Kyon Feulion
  - Voice Actress: Mayumi Iizuka
  - A cheerful, yet pessimistic, insulting and smart mouth little demon witch, Kyon is the second new member of the "Orchestral Army" and is the first high-ranking member that the team encounters, despite this it appears she is not very competent at keeping information a secret, often blurting out key bits of info in her conversations. After her subsequent defeat by them she carries a grudge against them and frequently insults them (particularly Kaguya) after losing to them in further battles. She and Henne Valkyria don't appear to get along at the best of times and generally get on each other's nerves. In battle she primarily fights using her broom that has been enhanced with technology, like traditional witches she can fly on her broom and can also use a variety of attacks with it she labels as "Bronte Magic", she can also launch projectile attacks from under her hat. Like the rest of the Ochestral Army, her motif is based on the Town Musicians of Bremen with her name being German for dog.
- Koma
  - Voice Actress: Mayumi Iizuka
  - A greedy catgirl merchant who frequently interferes with the protagonists, Koma also provides the group with various items and equipment in her traveling store "Caterwaul". She is not very loyal and very greedy, frequently using any situation to make a quick buck and willing to change sides as long as she gets paid (as Aschen puts it, she has "loyalty issues"). She has fought against Haken and his group a few times, due to being hired as being a bodyguard, but has almost greeted them with no hard feelings in later meetings despite being beaten by them in every battle. In battle she is a competent hand-to-hand fighter who wields a sword along with her natural cat claws and also uses her tail as a striking weapon and can even spin it around to hover in midair, she can also use money as a weapon, dumping large amounts to try to crush her enemies.
- Anne Sirena
  - Voice Actress: Sayaka Ohara
  - A pirate mermaid, Anne is the leader of the pirate group "Silent Works", from the underwater world of Varna Kanai, and commands the ship "Silent Vox", Haken has an interest for Anne to become wanted so he can collect the bounty. She is an expert on bombs and cannons, and as such, she also has a tendency to blow things up to solve her problems, she later assists the protagonists by lending them her ship to travel underwater to retrieve a large Mild Keil crystal and also provide bombs to destroy it but halfway through she and her first mate, Bonny, are brainwashed by the crystal into attacking the protagonists but is freed when she is defeated. Befitting her tendency to blow things up, in battle she uses two large cannons that can emit blasts of varying strength and power and using her fish tail to whip her opponents. Her motif is appropriately The Little Mermaid and her name makes up for the first half of Anne Bonny.
- Bonny Maxmad
  - Voice Actor: Kenta Miyake
  - An anthropomorphic merman, Bonny is Anne's first mate aboard the "Silent Vox" and a capable fighter in his own right. He shares his captain's interest in bombs and explosions but is overall more serious natured in situations then his captain, he also works part-time running Anne's merchant shop. Like his captain he is brainwashed by Mild Keil crystals but is freed when he was defeated by the protagonists. In battle he fights using a pair of large flintlocks rather than the cannons and bombs favoured by his captain but, in line with his merman nature, he can also call upon large schools of ferocious fish to attack enemies en masse as well as hindering their movements. He does not have a motif like Anne, but shares the second naming half of the famous female pirate Anne Bonny.
- Dorothy Mistral
  - Voice Actress: Natsuko Kuwatani
  - An inventor and bandit from Elfetale who often raids Lost Herencia for technology, she and Haken are well acquainted, partly because of them regularly meeting which almost always results in them fighting. Most of her character design is based on The Wizard of Oz (for example, a yellow brick road leads to her (green-hued) fortress, and the player is often attacked by a scarecrow, saw-wielding robot, and were-lion when traveling down it). She was developing technology to break Mild Keil crystals and consented to allow Haken to borrow it so long as he brings back a pure sample of Red Mild Keil crystal. In battle she uses a large variety of bombs and explosives of varying sizes and power which she keeps hidden under her dress, she also has the ability to summon a large tornado of rose petals to engulf her opponents. Her motif is from The Wizard Of Oz.
- Rubor Cucullus
  - Voice Actor: Ryotaro Okiayu
  - An anthropomorphic red wolf who is well-dressed and wears a crown on his head, he is a former Bounty Hunter and earns his position as king because of his achievements in war. He is very aggressive and would like nothing more than to get back at Ezel and the Orchestral Army for what they did to his kingdom even if it meant using the Personal Troopers they used against the world. He is very stubborn at times and holds a seething prejudice towards the Orchestral Army even after learning the truth about the Einst. He fights using an oversized lance whose point can open up to blast at opponents or extend a large spike to impale them and using his incredible speed and agility to smash his enemies around. His motif is from the wolf in The Little Red Riding Hood.
- Wahrschein Lichkeit
  - Voice Actor: Taiten Kusunoki
  - A resident of the Einst world, he is the creator of the Einst that invade the Endless Frontier, as well as the Frontier itself. It and the Einst are the remains of the Stern Regisseur from Super Robot Taisen: Original Generation 2, after it was defeated at the end of that game, by his own admission he has the power of a creator, his ultimate goal was to return to his world, but his method would have destroyed the Endless Frontier. The most powerful Einst in the game and single most powerful boss character faced, it took the entire team and the three Personal Troopers to finally vanquish him. Originally, upon their arrival to the Stern Regisseur, he confronted the protagonists immediately alongside a reverse engineered ArcGain, however he was not at full strength at the time and was defeated and the Einst ArcGain was destroyed but he managed to escape and recover while sending three reverse engineered Personal Troopers to stall them. Upon facing them again at the top of the Stern Regisseur he had recovered his previous damage and had reached his full strength, despite his overwhelming power he was defeated a second time and destroyed by the full power of Haken's Longtomb Special - Last Showdown, in turn resulting in the Endless Frontier fusing together into one large continent, supposedly how it was before the Einst created the Endless Frontier. In the first battle against him his abilities solely revolved around his massive regeneration and "Hades Line" ability which allowed him to fire potent beams of energy, varying from multiple shots, one big blast and a massive combination of both. During the second and final battle he was equipped with two arms that held axes which could inflict both types of poison onto a target as well as holding all of his previous abilities only stronger, with greater range and being able to inflict every form of status ailment possible. The word "Wahrscheinlichkeit" means "probability" in German.

==== Crossover ====
These characters have appeared in other media developed by Monolith Soft.

- Saya
  - Voice Actress: Ai Orikasa
  - The main antagonist of Namco × Capcom, Saya is a flirty werefox and works and the leader of the organization "Ouma", the counterpart to the "Shinra" organization. Saya is the one who gave Reiji the pulsating scar on his forehead. She is accompanied by her two henchmen, Dokumezu and Dokugozu. She appears to have lived a long time, as she refers to Xiaomu (who is well over 700 years old) as kid, during the events of Namco × Capcom Reiji personally finished off Saya during the penultimate battle but for some reason she had survived. The first time she met Haken and the team was when she was being pursued by Reiji and Xiaomu, due to their recent battle against the Orchestral Army she manages to trick them into attacking Reiji and Xiaomu while she herself made her escape. After she is encountered again she is defeated but manages to escape. Although battling her several times throughout their travels Reiji decides to let her be as they are all working to returning to their own world. In battle she can use her claws, which are also poisonous, as melee weapons. She also wields a fire sword, an electric sword and an ice sword as well as a shotgun and an arsenal of magical attacks similar to Xiaomu's.
- T-elos
  - Voice Actress: Mariko Suzuki
  - T-elos is KOS-MOS' counterpart and rival in Xenosaga Episode III: Also sprach Zarathustra. She seeks to settle the score with KOS-MOS once and for all. She is described by KOS-MOS as being more human than her but at the same time less so. This is apparently shown that despite her more human nature, she lacks basic humanity and is very ruthless, only allying with people when it serves her purposes and willing to kill them after they have no more use to her. She has been stated to be a far move advanced model of KOS-MOS and being more powerful, having destroyed KOS-MOS's previous body. Haken, Aschen and Kaguya first encountered her while investigating the Schlafen Celeste but she escaped before they could do anything. She is also trying to find a way back to her own world but refuses to team up with Haken and his group, opting to try to destroy them instead. After escaping from their first battle, she teams up Cardia and later with Saya and Einst copies of Reiji and Xiaomu. Though defeated both times she grudgingly leaves the team be, vowing to destroy KOS-MOS when they return to their own world. In battle she has many of the same abilities as KOS-MOS, but are coloured red rather than blue.

=== Mecha ===
Unlike the other games in the Super Robot Wars series, the mecha in Endless Frontier are actually either mechanical puppets called Karakuri, or autonomous robots about three meters tall. Most of them are based on full-sized mecha previously seen in the series and the template data from them was used to construct them.

- Phantom
  - This machine, also known as "Gespenst" ("Phantom" in German), is used specially by Haken to execute the "Ultimate Gespenst Kick". Along with this technique, the Phantom carries an assortment of cutting weapons, and a heavy energy cannon in its torso. It is revealed to be based on the Gespenst Haken, named so because it was made specially to work with Haken himself and was originally built to be the personal trooper to defeat the other three personal troopers. Originally it was under the command of Cardia Basirissa and was a wanted machine across the worlds. Upon coming across it the first time it was defeated causing it to retreat. Later, upon facing it again, it was damaged badly enough that its own original AI took over and was converted with a program to work for Haken. Since then the Gespenst Phantom became a part of the team and aiding them in all their later battles. The Gespenst returns in Endless Frontier Exceed and Project X Zone.
- Alteisen Nacht
  - Meaning Scrap Iron Night in German, this bulky, blue machine is capable of entering a "rage mode", where it turns red. The Nacht is armed with a five-barreled machine cannon on its left arm, a pile-bunker-like "Revolving Breaker" mounted on its right arm and a set of titanium, ball bearing-launchers rested on its shoulders named "Layered Claymore" and a smaller set hidden in its wrists. With the Abend, the Nacht can execute a deadly, dual manoeuvre called "Rampage Specter". It was the last of the three personal trooper fought against and was met just as it was escaping with a pure red Mild Keil crystal. It was encountered again alongside the Weissritter Abend where it was damaged enough that it stopped functioning and the Gespenst then uploaded the same program it had to the Nacht and Abend resulting in them joining the team and aiding them in all their later battles. The Alteisen Nacht returns in Endless Frontier Exceed.
- Weissritter Abend
  - Meaning White Knight Evening in German, like the Nacht, the Abend starts out with the colour opposite to its original design, i.e. red, but is similarly able to enter a "rage mode", turning blue. This machine carries a customized rifle called the "Partisan Launcher X" that fires solid- and energy-based projectiles which can expand to fire even greater energy blasts. It has a laser gun attached to its wrist with three barrels. With the Nacht, the Abend can execute a deadly, dual maneuver called "Rampage Specter". It was first encountered guarding the lower levels of the Mai Tierra, upon defeating it, several pieces were collected and analysed alongside the captured Gespent which was the first clue the team had towards their Einst construction. It was encountered again alongside the Alteisen Nacht where it was damaged enough that it stopped functioning and the Gespenst then uploaded the same program it had to the Nacht and Abend resulting in them joining the team and aiding them in all their later battles. The Weissritter Abend returns in Endless Frontier Exceed.
- Jyaki-GUN-Oh
  - The kanji of his name, 邪鬼銃王, mean Devil Gun King. A Traditional Combat Arts Battle Machinery (伝統攻芸戦術からくり, Dentō Kōgei Senjutsu Karakuri) of the Shiki-Oni. It is a dark blue mech with various silver, black and red highlights and has a somewhat jagged appearance, unique to this mech is that it has a mostly human shaped face. It was apparently built by Suzuka herself. It holds multiple solid-based weaponry within its body, ranging from bombs to machine guns, for melee combat it has shown to ability to charge its fists with electricity and is able to deliver multiple hard blows with these. It has also shown flight capabilities as well as being able to move at remarkable speeds with Suzuka usually riding on top during these moments. Suzuka is the only one who can summon this mech in battle, in fact she operates him with strings attached to her fans which she uses with her dances and it is her main form of fighting.
- ArcGain
  - Being mostly blue with black, white, yellow and red highlights, this mysterious robot can execute strings of melee combinations, alongside use of its razor-sharp elbow blades, shotgun like weapons in its legs and considerable hand-to-hand combat capabilities based on the W-series androids. Unlike the other mechs, the ArcGain was found on the Mai Tierra rather than being built from blueprints. Based on the Soulgain, which appeared in Super Robot Wars A. An entirely unknown robot who was an unexpected final mecha the team faced just after they had acquired the Alteisen Nacht and the Weissritter Abend, it is seen guarding a large orb of pure red Mild Keil crystal. Despite its considerable power, it was outnumbered and outmatched and was forced to retreat. It is later revealed to be under the control of the Einst and returns in the heart of the Mai Tierra with two Einst copies of Haken in a final bid to defeat the team. Upon being defeated, it self-destructs to prevent itself from being analyzed.

== Reception ==
Reception

Aggregate scores
Aggregator	Score
GameRankings	74% (20 Reviews)
Metacritic	73% (22 Reviews)

Review scores
Publication	Score
GameSpot	7/10
IGN	8/10
Thunderbolt	8/10

The game had done well in its opening weekend, selling 98,000 copies within the first week. While reviews varied from mixed to very positive, the game's unique battle system and the detailed battle simulations and sprites have generally garnered almost universally favourable reviews. Most negative criticisms were levelled at the fairly simplistic world view when not in battle along with the traditional wandering around until you encounter a battle as well as the fairly long dialogue at times.

PixlBit has given Super Robot Taisen OG Saga: Endless Frontier a 4.5/5 stating: "The game is a fantastic and very enjoyable RPG. The humorous dialog is retained thanks to Atlus' great localization. Though the graphical presentation is a little inconsistent, everything else about the game screams quality."

Destructoid has given it an 8/10 stating: "Super Robot Taisen OG Saga: Endless Frontier is a very interesting mix. You won't find a groundbreaking story here, but you will find both classic role-playing influences and new battle system ideas, all adorned with ridiculous female busts and robots and revolvers. The mix really works, with the end result being a lively and engaging role-playing title that's not afraid to unbutton the top few buttons and relax. Let it all hang out, so to speak."

== Sequel ==
A sequel to the game, titled Super Robot Taisen OG Saga: Endless Frontier Exceed has been announced. The game is set between Super Robot Wars Original Generation Gaiden and 2nd Super Robot Wars Original Generation. It will follow the adventures of Alady Nashe and Neige Hausen (an elven/'fairy' princess from Elfetale), two original characters that will be introduced in Exceed, across the Endless Frontier. Along with them are two new mechs, one is the Arkon, a mech based on the Ialdabaoth from Super Robot Wars Compact 3, and the Faycried, a mech based on a Fairlion from Super Robot Wars Original Generation 2. The opening song was performed by Nana Mizuki titled "UNCHAIN∞WORLD" and the movie sequences were done by the Animation Studio XEBEC. The game was released in Japan on February 25, 2010, selling 65,000 copies within the week, coming second in the Media Create's weekly sales chart, short just 6000 copies of first place.
