= Great Activity =

2007 studio album by Nana Mizuki

Studio album by Nana Mizuki
- Released: 14 November 2007
- Genre: J-pop, Pop rock, Hard rock, Symphonic rock, Electronica
- Length: 68:32 (CD), 98:41 (DVD)
- Label: King Records

Nana Mizuki chronology
The Museum (2007)	Great Activity (2007)	Ultimate Diamond (2009)

Great Activity is the sixth studio album from J-pop star and Japanese voice actor Nana Mizuki.

== Track listing ==
1. Bring it on!
  - Lyrics: Nana Mizuki
  - Composition: Matsuki Fuji
  - Arrangement: Elements Garden
2. Orchestral Fantasia
  - Lyrics: Hibiki
  - Composition, arrangement: Elements Garden
  - November theme for Music Fighter
3. Promise on Christmas
  - Lyrics: Sutsuka Hiwatari
  - Composition, arrangement: Hayato Tanaka
4. MASSIVE WONDERS
  - Lyrics: Nana Mizuki
  - Composition, arrangement: Toshiro Yabuki
  - Ending theme for Nippon TV variety program in August
  - Second opening song for anime television series Magical Girl Lyrical Nanoha Strikers
5. Take a chance
  - Lyrics: Chisato Nishimura
  - Composition: Wakabayashi Takashi
  - Arrangement: Shinya Saito
6. First Calendar (ファーストカレンダー)
  - Lyrics: Yuumao
  - Composition, arrangement: Junpei Fujita (Elements Garden)
7. Last Scene (ラストシーン)
  - Lyrics, composition: Hajime Mizoshita
  - Arrangement: Tsutomu Ohira
8. SEVEN
  - Lyrics, composition: Nana Mizuki
  - Arrangement: Hitoshi Fujima (Elements Garden)
9. Aoi Iro (アオイイロ)
  - Lyrics: Bee'
  - Composition, arrangement: AGENT-MR
10. TRY AGAIN
  - Lyrics, composition, arrangement: Toshiro Yabuki
11. Secret Ambition
  - Lyrics: Nana Mizuki
  - Composition: Shikura Chiyomaru
  - Arrangement: Hitoshi Fujima (Elements Garden)
  - Opening song for anime television series Magical Girl Lyrical Nanoha Strikers
12. Nostalgia
  - Lyrics: SAYURI
  - Composition: TLAST
  - Arrangement: Shinya Saito
13. Heart-shaped chant
  - Lyrics: Nana Mizuki
  - Composition, arrangement: Noriyasu Agematsu (Elements Garden)
  - Theme song for PS2 game Shining Wind
14. Chronicle of sky
  - Lyrics, composition: Shikura Chiyomaru
  - Arrangement: Elements Garden
15. Sing Forever
  - Lyrics: Sonoda Ryoji
  - Composition, arrangement: Hitoshi Fujima (Elements Garden)

== DVD ==
NANA SUMMER FESTA 2007 DIGEST:

- OPENING: Level Hi!
- 10. You have a dream
- NANA SONG BEST 50–41
- 09. Suddenly ~Meguriaete~ (suddenly 〜巡り合えて〜)
- 08. New Sensation
- 07. SUPER GENERATION
- NANA SONG BEST 40–31
- 06. Tears' Night
- 05. Heart-shaped chant
- 04. Crystal Letter
- 03. Eternal Blaze
- NANA SONG BEST 30–21
- 02. POWER GATE
- NANA SONG BEST 20–11
- 01. innocent starter
- Pierce (ピアス) ~acoustic version~
- Hoshizora to tsuki to hanabi no shita (星空と月と花火の下) ~acoustic version~
- Massive Wonders

== Charts ==
Chart	Peak position	Sales	Time in chart
Oricon Weekly Albums	#2	66,037	10 weeks
