= Sayuri Katayama =

Japanese actress and musician

- Born: Sayuri Katayama; July 3, 1979 (age 47); Saga, Japan

Sayuri Katayama (片山 さゆり, Katayama Sayuri; previously 片山 沙有里) born July 3, 1979 is a Japanese singer, stage actress and songwriter.

She has played the role of Kou Seiya in the Sailor Moon musicals. As a songwriter, she is known as Sayuri.

== Personal life ==
Sayuri studied at Horikoshi High School as a student, and knew Nana Mizuki there. Currently, she has written lyrics for several songs by Nana Mizuki.

== Stage career ==
Sayuri became the first actress to play Kou Seiya in the Sailor Moon musicals at the age of 17. Her first show was the 1996 Summer Special Musical Bishoujo Senshi Sailor Moon Sailor Stars. She continued to perform until the 1998 Winter Special Musical Bishoujo Senshi Sailor Moon Eien Densetsu (Kaiteiban) The Final First Stage!!.

Sayuri is the longest-running actress of Seiya Kou/Sailor Star Fighter, performing for 113 stages.

Preceded by none	Seiya Kou/Sailor Star Fighter in the Sailor Moon musicals 1996-1998	Succeeded by Chinatsu Akiyama

== Discography ==
=== Singles ===
1. Paradise is Over (released on 24 March 2004)
  1. Paradise is Over
    - Composition: Eriko Yoshiki
    - Arrangement: Takahiro Iida, Taichi Nakamura
    - 'Kingdom of Chaos' theme song
    - 'Steady x Study' ending theme
  2. No Where Girl
    - Composition: Kei Yoshikawa
    - Arrangement: Takahiro Iida, Taichi Nakamura
    - 'Steady x Study' opening theme

=== Albums ===
1. Chaos (released on 14 April 2004)
  1. Another Sky
    - Composition: Yoshio Tatano
    - Arrangement: Takahiro Iida, Kazuyoshi Baba
    - 'Shinten Makai Generation of Chaos IV' opening theme
  2. Paradise is Over
    - Composition: Eriko Yoshiki
    - Arrangement: Takahiro Iida, Taichi Nakamura
    - 'Kingdom of Chaos' theme song
    - 'Steady x Study' ending theme
  3. Intermission
    - Composition: Takahiro Iida
    - Arrangement: Takahiro Iida, Taichi Nakamura
    - 'Shinten Makai Generation of Chaos IV' insert song
  4. Fade Away
    - Composition: Ruka Oba
    - Arrangement: Takahiro Iida, Kazuyoshi Baba
    - 'Shinten Makai Generation of Chaos IV' ending theme
  5. No Where Girl
    - Composition: Kei Yoshikawa
    - Arrangement: Takahiro Iida, Taichi Nakamura
    - 'Steady x Study' opening theme

== Songwriting ==
=== Songs by Nana Mizuki ===
1. Nostalgia (released on 14 November 2007 on Nana's album Great Activity)
  - Composition: Tlast, Arrangement: Shinya Saito
2. Soradokei (空時計) (released on 6 February 2008 on Nana's single Starcamp EP)
  - Composition, arrangement: Tsutomu Ohira
3. Gozen Rei-Ji no Baby Doll (午前0時のBaby Doll) (released on 21 January 2009 on Nana's single Shin'ai)
  - Composition: Ryouhei Sugita, Arrangement: Nishi-ken
  - Ending theme for radio show Gold Rush: Nana Mizuki's M world (GOLD RUSH ★水樹奈々のＭの世界★)
4. Mr. Bunny! (released on 3 June 2009 on Nana's album Ultimate Diamond)
  - Composition: Wakabayashi Makoto, Arrangement: Shinya Saito
5. Strobe Cinema (ストロボシネマ) (released on 7 July 2010 on Nana's album Impact Exciter)
  - Composition, arrangement: Shogo Ohnishi
  - Ending theme for Tokyo FM Nana Mizuki's M world (水樹奈々のＭの世界)
6. High-Stepper (released on 13 April 2011 on Nana's single Scarlet Knight)
  - Composition, arrangement: Shinya Saito
7. Love Brick (released on 11 January 2011 on Nana's single Synchrogazer, lyrics jointly written with Nana Mizuki and meg rock)
  - Composition, arrangement: Shinya Saito
8. Party! Party! (released on 6 June 2012 on Nana's single Time Space EP)
  - Composition, arrangement: Tajiri Tomoyuki
