= Secret Ambition =

Secret Ambition may refer to:

- Secret Ambition, 1930s US radio show hosted by Tom Breneman
- "Secret Ambition", single by Michael W. Smith from his 1988 album i 2 (EYE)
- "Secret Ambition" (song), Japanese song by Nana Mizuki
