= Justice to Believe / Aoi Iro =

"Justice to Believe/Aoi Iro"

Single by Nana Mizuki
- Released: 15 November 2006
- Genre: J-pop
- Length: 18:51
- Label: King Records
- Songwriters: Justice to Believe: Nana Mizuki, Noriyasu Agematsu; Aoi Iro: Bee, AGENT-MR

Nana Mizuki singles chronology
"Super Generation" (2006)	"Justice to Believe/Aoi Iro" (2006)	"Secret Ambition" (2007)

Back cover
- Aoi Iro

Music video
- "Justice to Believe" on YouTube "Aoi Iro" on YouTube

"Justice to Believe/Aoi Iro" is the 14th single from Japanese voice actress and singer Nana Mizuki. This is her first single in 10 months since 'Super Generation' in January 2006.

The single was ranked No. 4 on the Japanese Oricon charts.

== Reception ==
RPGFan wrote about "Justice to Believe": "It's great; it's very catchy. It has an intense and catchy melody with some western flair." About "Aoi Iro" ("Blue Color") they said: "The song isn't bad by any means, but it's totally generic."

== Track listing ==
1. Justice to Believe
  - Lyrics: Nana Mizuki
  - Composition, arrangement: Noriyasu Agematsu (Elements Garden)
  - Theme song for PS2 game Wild Arms 5
  - New rendition for this song is featured in Nana Mizuki's greatest hits album The Museum
2. Aoi Iro (アオイイロ)
  - Lyrics: Bee
  - Composition, arrangement: AGENT-MR
  - Ending theme for a TV Tokyo program
  - This song is included in Nana Mizuki's 2007 album Great Activity
3. Justice to Believe (without NANA)
4. Aoi Iro (without NANA) (アオイイロ(without NANA))

== Charts ==
Chart	Peak position	Sales	Time in chart
Oricon Weekly Singles	#4	41,274	10 weeks
