= Time Space (EP) =

"Time Space EP"

Single by Nana Mizuki

from the album Rockbound Neighbors
- A-side: Metro Baroque; Party! Party!; Jikū Sapphire; One
- Released: June 6, 2012
- Recorded: 2011
- Genre: Pop, Jazz fusion, House, pop-rock
- Label: King Records
- Songwriter(s): Nana Mizuki

Nana Mizuki singles chronology
"Synchrogazer" (2012)	"Time Space EP" (2012)	"Bright Stream" (2012)

"Time Space EP" is the 27th single by the Japanese singer and voice actress Nana Mizuki, released on June 6, 2012, by King Records.

== Track listing ==
1. "Metro Baroque"
  - Lyrics: Nana Mizuki
  - Composition: Yashikin
  - Arrangement: Masato Nakayama (Elements Garden)
  - Theme song for anime movie Blood-C: The Last Dark
2. "Party! Party!"
  - Lyrics: Sayuri Katayama
  - Composition, arrangement: Tajiri Tomoyuki
  - TBS TV show "Rank Okoku" opening theme for June and July
3. "Jikū Sapphire" (時空サファイア, Space-Time Sapphire)
  - Lyrics: Yūmao
  - Composition: Eriko Yoshiki
  - Arrangement: Jun Suyama
  - CM theme song for Meiji Kajuu Gumi Megumi to Taiyou II
4. "One"
  - Lyrics: Nana Mizuki
  - Composition: Hidekazu Uchiike
  - Arrangement: Hitoshi Fujima (Elements Garden)
  - Ending theme for NHK-BS Premium TV show Animal Wonder

== Charts ==
Oricon Sales Chart (Japan)

Chart	Peak position	First day/Week sales	Sales total
Oricon Daily Charts	3	18,038	71,843
Oricon Weekly Charts	3	52,974	71,843
Oricon Monthly Charts	8	67,854	71,843
