= Rockbound Neighbors =

Studio album by Nana Mizuki
- Released: (Japan) December 12, 2012
- Genre: J-pop
- Length: 69:58
- Label: King Records

Nana Mizuki chronology
The Museum II (2011)	Rockbound Neighbors (2012)	Supernal Liberty (2014)

Singles from Rockbound Neighbors
- 1. "Synchrogazer" Released: January 11, 2012; 2. "Time Space EP" Released: June 6, 2012; 3. "Bright Stream" Released: August 1, 2012

Rockbound Neighbors is an album by Nana Mizuki. It was released on December 12, 2012 in three editions: a CD only edition and two limited CD+BD/DVD editions. Two limited editions includes two videos: photo shooting of the album and the special live - Heian Jingu Hounou Kouen ~Sougetsu no Utage~.

== Track listing ==
1. Avalon no Oukan（アヴァロンの王冠）
  - Lyrics: Hibiki
  - Composition: Junpei Fujita (Elements Garden)
  - Arrangements: Evan Call (Elements Garden)
2. Naked Soldier
  - Lyrics & Composition: KOUTAPAI
  - Arrangements: Masato Nakayama (Elements Garden)
3. Get my drift?
  - Lyrics: Hassy
  - Composition: Hajime Kato
  - Arrangements: Shogo Ohnishi
4. Lovely Fruit
  - Lyrics: Hibiki
  - Composition and Arrangements: Noriyasu Agematsu (Elements Garden)
  - Ending song for the anime "Toriko"
5. Darling Plastic（ダーリンプラスティック）
  - Lyrics: Hiroyuki Ito
  - Composition and Arrangements: Shoko Fujibayashi
  - Ending theme for the Tokyo FM show "Nana Mizuki's M World"
6. Bright Stream
  - Lyrics: Nana Mizuki
  - Composition: Eriko Yoshiki
  - Arrangements: Hitoshi Fujima (Elements Garden)
  - Theme song for the movie "Magical Girl Lyrical Nanoha THE MOVIE 2nd A's"
7. Hoshikuzu Symphony（星屑シンフォニー）
  - Lyrics & Composition: Shihori
  - Arrangements: Shinya Saito
8. Linkage
  - Lyrics: Yuumao
  - Composition: Shunryuu
  - Arrangements: Katou Yuusuke
  - Theme song for the 3DS/PSP game "Unchained Blades Exiv"
9. Star Road
  - Lyrics & Composition: Nana Mizuki
  - Arrangements: Hitoshi Fujima (Elements Garden)
10. Synchrogazer -Aufwachen Form-
  - Lyrics: Nana Mizuki
  - Composition and Arrangements: Noriyasu Agematsu (Elements Garden)
  - Opening song for the anime "Senki Zessho Symphogear"
11. Crescent Child
  - Lyrics: Shoko Fujibayashi
  - Composition: Takashi Matsuiki
  - Arrangements: Integral Clover
12. Kiseki no Melodia（奇跡のメロディア）
  - Lyrics: Nana Mizuki
  - Composition: Noriyasu Agematsu (Elements Garden)
  - Arrangements: Hitoshi Fujima (Elements Garden)
  - Theme song for the PSP game "Shining Arc only"
13. Metro Baroque
  - Lyrics: Nana Mizuki
  - Composition: Yashikin
  - Arrangements: Masato Nakayama (Elements Garden)
  - Theme song for the movie "Blood-C: The Last Dark"
14. Happy☆Go-Round!
  - Lyrics: Rico
  - Composition and Arrangements: Shinya Saito
  - Theme song for the original drama series "Switch Girl! 2"
15. Sacred Force -Extended Mix-
  - Lyrics: Hibiki
  - Composition: Shihori
  - Arrangements: Hitoshi Fujima (Elements Garden)
  - Insert song for the movie "Magical Girl Lyrical Nanoha THE MOVIE 2nd A's"
16. Yakusoku（約束）
  - Lyrics: Sayuri and Nana Mizuki
  - Composition: Eriko Yoshiki
  - Arrangements: Jun Suyuma

== Charts ==
=== Oricon Sales Chart (Japan) ===
Chart	Peak position	First-day/week sales	Sales total
Oricon Daily Charts	1	36,779 (First day)	139,004
Oricon Weekly Charts	2	96,661	139,004
Oricon Monthly Charts	-	-	139,004
Oricon Yearly Charts	42	139,004	139,004
