= Junketsu Paradox =

Single by Nana Mizuki

from the album The Museum II
- Released: August 3, 2011
- Recorded: Japan
- Genre: Pop
- Label: King Records
- Songwriter: Nana Mizuki

Nana Mizuki singles chronology
"Pop Master" (2011)	"Junketsu Paradox" (2011)	"Synchrogazer" (2012)

Music video
- "Junketsu Paradox" on YouTube

"Junketsu Paradox" is the 25th single by Japanese singer and voice actress Nana Mizuki, released on August 3, 2011 by King Records.

== Track listing ==
1. "Junketsu Paradox"
  - Lyrics: Nana Mizuki
  - Composition: Eriko Yoshiki
  - Arrangement: Jun Suyama
  - Ending theme for anime television series Blood-C
2. "7Colors"
  - Lyrics, composition: Yoshihiro Saito
  - Arrangement: Takahiro Furukawa
  - Ending theme for TBS TV program Sekai Fushigi Hakken!
3. "Stay Gold"
  - Lyrics, composition: Koutapai
  - Arrangement: Junpei Fujita (Elements Garden)
  - Ending theme for Tokyo FM Nana Mizuki's M world (水樹奈々のＭの世界)

== Charts ==
Oricon Sales Chart (Japan)

Chart	Peak position	First day/Week sales	Sales total
Oricon Daily Charts	2	15,415 (First day)	72,746
Oricon Weekly Charts	3	50,811	72,746
Oricon Monthly Charts	10	67,138	72,746
Oricon Yearly Charts	105	72,746	72,746
