= Synchrogazer =

Single by Nana Mizuki

from the album Rockbound Neighbors
- Released: January 11, 2012
- Recorded: 2011
- Genre: J-pop, Anison
- Label: King Records
- Songwriter: Nana Mizuki

Nana Mizuki singles chronology
"Junketsu Paradox" (2011)	"Synchrogazer" (2012)	"Time Space EP" (2012)

Music video
- "Synchrogazer" on YouTube

"Synchrogazer" is the 26th single by Japanese singer and voice actress Nana Mizuki, released on January 11, 2012 by King Records.

== Track listing ==
1. "Synchrogazer"
  - Lyrics: Nana Mizuki
  - Composition: Noriyasu Agematsu
  - Arrangement: Noriyasu Agematsu
  - Opening theme for anime television series Senki Zesshō Symphogear
2. "Love Brick"
  - Lyrics: Megumi Hinata, Nana Mizuki, Sayuri Katayama
  - Composition: Shinya Saitō
  - Arrangement: Hitoshi Fujima (Elements Garden)
  - Theme song for the Fuji TV Two Drama Switch Girl!!
3. "Risōron" (理想論; "Idealistic Theory")
  - Lyrics: Shoko Fujibayashi
  - composition: Yu-pan.
  - Arrangement: Hitoshi Fujima (Elements Garden)

== Charts ==
Oricon Sales Chart (Japan)

Chart	Peak position	First day/Week sales	Sales total
Oricon Daily Charts	2	17,089	79,505
Oricon Weekly Charts	2	51,017	79,505
Oricon Monthly Charts	5	69,981	79,505
Oricon Yearly Charts	101	79,505	79,505
