= Pop Master =

"POP MASTER"

Single by Nana Mizuki

from the album The Museum II
- Released: April 13, 2011
- Recorded: Japan
- Genre: Pop
- Label: King Records
- Songwriter: Nana Mizuki

Nana Mizuki singles chronology
| "Scarlet Knight" (2011) | "POP MASTER" (2011) | "Junketsu Paradox" (2011) |

Music video
- "POP MASTER" on YouTube

"POP MASTER" is the 24th single by Japanese singer and voice actress Nana Mizuki, released on April 13, 2011, together with her 23rd single, "Scarlet Knight".

== Track listing ==
1. "POP MASTER"
  - Lyrics, composition: Nana Mizuki
  - Arrangement: Hitoshi Fujima (Elements Garden)
  - Cheering song for NTV's 31st High School Quiz
  - Theme song for mobile game Idol o Tsukuro
2. "Unbreakable"
  - Lyrics: Shoko Fujibayashi
  - Composition: Shunryuu
  - Arrangement: Jun Suyama
  - Opening theme for Nintendo 3DS and Sony PlayStation Portable game UnchainBlades Rexx

== Charts ==
=== Oricon Sales Chart (Japan) ===
| Chart | Peak position | First Day/Week sales | Sales total |
|---|---|---|---|
| Oricon Daily Charts | 3 | 14,708 (First day) | 73,609 |
| Oricon Weekly Charts | 3 | 51,883 | 73,609 |
| Oricon Monthly Charts | 9 | 65,026 | 73,609 |
| Oricon Yearly Charts | 103 | 73,609 | 73,609 |
