= Bright Stream =

Single by Nana Mizuki

from the album Rockbound Neighbors
- B-side: Fearless Hero; Sacred Force
- Released: August 1, 2012
- Recorded: 2012
- Genre: Pop
- Label: King Records
- Composer: Eriko Yoshiki
- Lyricist: Nana Mizuki

Nana Mizuki singles chronology
"Time Space EP" (2012)	"Bright Stream" (2012)	"Vitalization" (2013)

Music video
- "Bright Stream" on YouTube

"Bright Stream" is the 28th single by Japanese singer and voice actress Nana Mizuki, released on August 1, 2012 by King Records.

== Track listing ==
1. "Bright Stream"
  - Lyrics: Nana Mizuki
  - Composition: Eriko Yoshiki
  - Arrangement: Hitoshi Fujima (Elements Garden)
  - Theme song for anime movie Magical Girl Lyrical Nanoha The Movie 2nd A's
2. "Fearless Hero"
  - Lyrics: Shoko Fujibayashi
  - Composition: Yuki Nara
  - Arrangement: Junpei Fujita (Elements Garden)
  - Opening theme for anime television Dog Days'
3. "Sacred Force"
  - Lyrics: Hibiki
  - Composition: Shihori
  - Arrangement: Hitoshi Fujima (Elements Garden)
  - Insert song for anime movie Magical Girl Lyrical Nanoha The Movie 2nd A's

== Charts ==
Oricon Sales Chart (Japan)

Chart	Peak position	First day/Week sales	Sales total
Oricon Daily Charts	1	23,921	102,924
Oricon Weekly Charts	2	75,379	102,924
Oricon Monthly Charts	5	96,624	102,924
Oricon Yearly Charts	79	102,924	102,924
