= Super Robot Wars OG Saga: Endless Frontier Exceed =

2010 video game

Super Robot Taisen OG Saga: Endless Frontier Exceed
- Cover art
- Developer: Monolith Soft
- Publisher: Bandai Namco Games (Note: Released under the Banpresto brand name.)
- Director: Soichiro Morizumi
- Producer: Koji Ishitani
- Artists: Kazue Saito; Sachiko Kono
- Writer: Soichiro Morizumi
- Composers: Salamander; Noriyasu Agematsu
- Series: Super Robot Wars
- Platform: Nintendo DS
- Release: JP: February 25, 2010
- Genre: Role-playing
- Mode: Single-player

Super Robot Taisen OG Saga: Endless Frontier Exceed (Note: 無限のフロンティアエクシード スーパーロボット大戦OGサーガ (Japanese: Mugen no Furontia Ekushīdo: Sūpā Robotto Taisen OG Sāga)) is a crossover role-playing video game developed by Monolith Soft and published by Namco Bandai Games for the Nintendo DS (DS) in 2010. Forming part of the Super Robot Wars series, Endless Frontier Exceed is a sequel to the 2008 DS game Super Robot Taisen OG Saga: Endless Frontier, carrying over its gameplay elements.

== Premise ==
Super Robot Taisen OG Saga: Endless Frontier Exceed is a crossover role-playing video game. Players take control of a party of characters drawn from multiple anime and video game franchises. Gameplay is divided between field navigation, dialogue sections between characters, and turn-based battles where players can expend action points to perform different moves.

== Development ==
Endless Frontier Exceed was co-developed by Monolith Soft, a Japanese company known for its work on the Xenosaga series, and Super Robot Wars creators Banpresto. The team from Monolith Soft included veterans from the PlayStation 2 crossover title Namco × Capcom. The scenario was written by director Soichiro Morizumi, using his recurring story theme of "Love". The anime opening was produced by Xebec. The music was handled by a team of composers from Salamander, a music production company which had worked on earlier Super Robot Wars. The theme song "UNCHAIN∞WORLD" was composed by Noriyasu Agematsu of Element Garden, and performed by Nana Mizuki. The game was released on February 25, 2010.

== Reception ==
During its debut week, Endless Frontier Exceed reached third place in gaming charts, with sales of 65,000 units. In subsequent weeks it remained in the top twenty, with total sales by March coming to over 87,000 units.

Japanese gaming magazine Famitsu gave the game a score of 32 out of 40.
