= Impact Exciter =

Studio album by Nana Mizuki
- Released: July 7, 2010
- Genre: J-pop; pop rock; electronic rock; synthpop
- Length: 68:14
- Label: King

Nana Mizuki chronology
Ultimate Diamond (2009)	Impact Exciter (2010)	The Museum II (2011)

Singles from Impact Exciter
- 1. "Mugen" Released: October 28, 2009; 2. "Phantom Minds" Released: January 13, 2010; 3. "Don't Be Long" Released: January 13, 2010; 4. "Silent Bible" Released: February 10, 2010

Impact Exciter is the eighth studio album by Japanese voice actress and pop singer Nana Mizuki. It was released on July 7, 2010, in Japan in two editions: a CD only edition and a limited CD+DVD edition. The limited edition includes a special box, a 77-minute DVD and a 48-page hardback photobook. This also became Mizuki's first foreign released album because of the cooperation between King Records and Gold Typhoon Music in Taiwan. The Taiwanese edition was released on October 29, 2010.

== Track listing ==
1. Time to Impact Exciter
  - Composition, arrangement: Noriyasu Agematsu (Elements Garden)
2. Next Arcadia
  - Lyrics: Hibiki
  - Composition, arrangement: Noriyasu Agematsu (Elements Garden)
3. Myusterion (ミュステリオン)
  - Lyrics, composition: Shihori
  - Arrangement: Masato Nakayama (Elements Garden)
  - Ending theme for TBS TV program Ha!Ha!Ha! Bakusho Mondai in June and July
4. Silent Bible
  - Lyrics: Nana Mizuki
  - Composition: Haruki Mori (Elements Garden)
  - Arrangement: Daisuke Kikuta (Elements Garden)
  - Opening theme for PlayStation Portable game Magical Girl Lyrical Nanoha A's Portable: The Battle of Aces
5. Young Alive!
  - Lyrics: Nana Mizuki
  - Composition: Miyake Hirobumi
  - Arrangement: Junpei Fujita (Elements Garden)
6. Scoop Scope
  - Lyrics: Yūmao
  - Composition, arrangement: Shinya Saitō
7. Dragonia
  - Lyrics: Hibiki
  - Composition: Shunryuu
  - Arrangement: Junpei Fujita (Elements Garden)
8. "Mugen" (夢幻; Fantasy)
  - Lyrics: Nana Mizuki
  - Composition: Agematsu Noriyasu (Elements Garden)
  - Arrangement: Junpei Fujita (Elements Garden)
  - Second opening theme for anime television series White Album
9. Karen Moyou (夏恋模様)
  - Lyrics: Fujibayashi Shouko
  - Composition, arrangement: Saito Yuya
10. Koi no Yokushiryoku (恋の抑止力-type EXCITER-; Love Deterrence -Type Exciter-)
  - Lyrics: Metal Gear Solid Peace Walker sound team
  - Composition: Akihiro Honda
  - Arrangement: Daisuke Kikuta (Elements Garden)
11. Phantom Minds
  - Lyrics: Nana Mizuki
  - Composition: Eriko Yoshiki
  - Arrangement: Jun Suyama
  - Opening theme for anime film Magical Girl Lyrical Nanoha The Movie 1st
12. Strobe Cinema (ストロボシネマ)
  - Lyrics: Sayuri Katayama
  - Composition, arrangement: Shogo Ohnishi
  - Ending theme for Tokyo FM Nana Mizuki's M world (水樹奈々のＭの世界)
13. Toraware no Babel (囚われのBabel)
  - Lyrics: Gorō Matsui
  - Composition, arrangement: Junpei Fujita (Elements Garden)
14. Albireo (アルビレオ)
  - Lyrics, composition: Nana Mizuki
  - Arrangement: Hitoshi Fujima (Elements Garden)
15. Don't be long
  - Lyrics, composition, arrangement: Toshirō Yabuki
  - Insert song for anime film Magical Girl Lyrical Nanoha The Movie 1st
16. July 7 (7月7日)
  - Lyrics: Nana Mizuki
  - Composition: Mika Agematsu
  - Arrangement: Hitoshi Fujima (Elements Garden)

== Limited DVD Mizuki Academy track list ==
1. [Lesson 1: English] Nana in London - Ultimate Diamond Shooting Movie (with English subtitle)
2. [Lesson 2: Gymnastics] Ehime Mandarin Pirates First Pitch Ceremony
3. [Lesson 3: Society] Minetopia Besshi Social Studies Field Trip
4. [Lesson 4: Science] National Museum of Emerging Science and Innovation Science Field Trip
5. [Lesson 5: Home Economics] Teacher Nana's Chasse Recipe
6. [Lesson 6: Dance] Choreography Music Video "Koi no Yokushiryoku -type EXCITER-"
7. [Lesson 7: Japanese] Lyrics Commentary and Music Video "July 7"

== Charts ==
=== Oricon Sales Chart (Japan) ===
Chart	Peak position	First-day/week sales	Sales total
Oricon Daily Charts	2	36,292 (First day)	126,175
Oricon Weekly Charts	2	93,364	126,175
Oricon Monthly Charts	7	114,843	126,175
Oricon Yearly Charts	65	124,514	126,175
