= Silent Bible =

Single by Nana Mizuki

from the album Impact Exciter
- Released: February 10, 2010
- Recorded: 2009
- Genre: Pop
- Label: King Records
- Composer: Haruki Mori
- Lyricist: Nana Mizuki

Nana Mizuki singles chronology
"Phantom Minds" (2010)	"Silent Bible" (2010)	"Scarlet Knight" (2011)

"Silent Bible" is the 22nd single by Japanese singer and voice actress Nana Mizuki, released on February 10, 2010 by King Records. This is the first single which songs were featured in two different video games created by Namco Bandai Games.

== Track listing ==
1. "Silent Bible"
  - Lyrics: Nana Mizuki
  - Composition: Haruki Mori (Elements Garden)
  - Arrangement: Daisuke Kikuta (Elements Garden)
  - Opening theme for PlayStation Portable game Magical Girl Lyrical Nanoha A's Portable: The Battle of Aces
2. "Polaris"
  - Lyrics: Yumi Moriguchi & Shin Furuya
  - Composition: Yumi Moriguchi
  - Arrangement: Jun Suyama
3. "UNCHAIN∞WORLD"
  - Lyrics: Hibiki
  - Composition: Noriyasu Agematsu (Elements Garden)
  - Arrangement: Masato Nakayama (Elements Garden)
  - Opening theme for Nintendo DS game Super Robot Taisen OG Saga: Endless Frontier EXCEED
4. "undercover"
  - Lyrics: Shōko Fujibayashi
  - Composition: Shinya Saitō
  - Arrangement: Shinya Saitō

== Charts ==
Oricon Sales Chart (Japan)

Chart	Peak position	First day/week sales	Sales total	Chart run
Oricon Daily Charts	2	15,910 (First Day)	72,062	12 weeks
Oricon Weekly Charts	3	50,646	72,062	12 weeks
Oricon Monthly Charts	7	64,529	72,062	12 weeks
Oricon Yearly Charts	97	72,062	72,062	12 weeks
