= Shin'ai =

Single by Nana Mizuki

from the album Ultimate Diamond
- Released: January 21, 2009
- Recorded: Japan
- Genre: Symphonic pop
- Label: King Records
- Songwriter: Nana Mizuki

Nana Mizuki singles chronology
"Trickster" (2008)	"Shin'ai" (2009)	"Mugen" (2009)

"Shin'ai (深愛)" is the 19th single by Japanese singer and voice actress Nana Mizuki, which was released on January 21, 2009, by King Records bearing the catalog number KICM-1270. composed, arranged, and produced by members of Elements Garden, Miki Watabe, Yōhei Sugita, Hibiki, Sayuri, and Nishi-ken. The single reached number 2 in Japan's Oricon weekly singles charts for the week of February 1, 2009.

== Track listing ==
1. "Shin'ai" (深愛, lit. Deep love)
  - Lyrics: Nana Mizuki
  - Composition: Noriyasu Agematsu (Elements Garden)
  - Arrangement: Hitoshi Fujima (Elements Garden)
  - Opening theme for anime television series White Album
2. "Pride of Glory"
  - Lyrics: Hibiki
  - Composition, arrangement: Miki Watabe
  - Ending theme in January for radio show Radio De Culture.
3. "Gozen Rei-Ji no Baby Doll" (午前0時のBaby Doll, lit. Baby Doll of 0 a.m.)
  - Lyrics: Sayuri
  - Composition: Yōhei Sugita
  - Arrangement: Nishi-ken
  - Ending theme for radio show Gold Rush: Nana Mizuki's M world (GOLD RUSH ★水樹奈々のMの世界★)

== Charts ==
Chart	Peak position	Sales	Time in chart
Oricon Daily Singles	1		
Oricon Weekly Singles	2	42,630	
Oricon Monthly Singles Chart	9	55,671	5 weeks
Oricon Yearly Singles Chart	95		

Total Sales: 62,869
