= Mugen (Nana Mizuki song) =

Single by Nana Mizuki

from the album Impact Exciter
- Released: October 28, 2009
- Recorded: 2009
- Genre: Pop
- Label: King Records

Nana Mizuki singles chronology
"Shin'ai" (2009)	"Mugen" (2009)	"Phantom Minds" (2010)

Music video
- "Mugen" on YouTube

"Mugen" (夢幻; "Fantasy") is the 20th single by Japanese singer and voice actress Nana Mizuki, which was released on October 28, 2009, by King Records. The single reached number 3 in Japan's Oricon weekly singles charts for the week of November 9, 2009.

== Track listing ==
1. "Mugen" (夢幻; Fantasy)
  - Lyrics: Nana Mizuki
  - Composition: Noriyasu Agematsu (Elements Garden)
  - Arrangement: Junpei Fujita
  - Second opening theme for the anime television series White Album
2. "Tenkū no Canaria" (天空のカナリア)
  - Lyrics: Hibiki
  - Composition: Yuusuke Katou
  - Arrangement: Yuusuke Katou
  - Opening theme for the anime film Tales of Symphonia the Animation Tethe'alla-hen.
3. "Dear Dream"
  - Lyrics: Shihori
  - Composition: Shihori
  - Arrangement: Shinya Saitou, Ipemoto
  - Ending theme for Card Gakuen
4. "Stories"
  - Lyrics: Leo Kanda, Kazunori Saita
  - Composition: Yoshihiro Saito
  - Arrangement: Takahiro Furukawa

== Charts ==
Chart	Peak position	Sales	Time in chart
Oricon Daily Singles	2		
Oricon Weekly Singles	3	44,718	
Oricon Monthly Singles Chart	9	56,375	
Oricon Yearly Singles Chart	99		

Total Sales : 64,989
