= Trickster (song) =

Single by Nana Mizuki

from the album Ultimate Diamond
- B-side: DISCOTHEQUE; Trinity Cross
- Released: (Japan) October 1, 2008
- Recorded: Japan
- Genre: J-rock, Pop, dance-pop
- Label: King Records
- Songwriter(s): Nana Mizuki, Noriyasu Agematsu,

Nana Mizuki singles chronology
"Starcamp EP" (2008)	"Trickster" (2008)	"Shin'ai" (2009)

"Trickster" is the 18th single by Japanese singer and voice actress Nana Mizuki. The single contains the opening theme and ending theme for the anime Rosario + Vampire Capu2. This single holds the highest selling numbers for her first week sales and reached #100 in 2008 Oricon top 100 singles.

== Track listing ==
CD (KICM-1251)
No.	Title	Lyrics	Music	Length
1.	"Trickster" (Animelo Music TV-CF and "Music Fighter" Power Play.)	Nana Mizuki	Noriyasu Agematsu	3:49
2.	"DISCOTHEQUE" (Rosario + Vampire Capu2 opening theme)	Ryōji Sonoda	Noriyasu Agematsu	3:59
3.	"Trinity Cross" (Rosario + Vampire Capu2 ending theme)	Shikura Chiyomaru	Shikura Chiyomaru, Hitoshi Fujima	4:26

== Charts ==
Chart	Peak position	Sales	Time in chart
Oricon Weekly Singles	#2	82,297	18 weeks
