= Phantom Minds =

Single by Nana Mizuki

from the album Impact Exciter
- Released: January 13, 2010
- Recorded: 2009
- Genre: Pop
- Label: King Records
- Composer: Eriko Yoshiki
- Lyricist: Nana Mizuki

Nana Mizuki singles chronology
| "Mugen" (2009) | "Phantom Minds" (2010) | "Silent Bible" (2010) |

Music video
- "Phantom Minds" on YouTube

"Phantom Minds" is the 21st single by Japanese singer and voice actress Nana Mizuki, released on January 13, 2010, by King Records. The single debuted at number one on Oricon weekly charts, becoming the first voice actress single to top the charts. It is also her current highest selling single.

== Track listing ==
1. "Phantom Minds"
  - Lyrics: Nana Mizuki
  - Composition: Eriko Yoshiki
  - Arrangement: Jun Suyama
  - Opening theme for anime film Magical Girl Lyrical Nanoha The Movie 1st
2. "Don't be long"
  - Lyrics: Toshirō Yabuki
  - Composition: Toshirō Yabuki
  - Arrangement: Toshirō Yabuki
  - Insert song for anime film Magical Girl Lyrical Nanoha The Movie 1st
3. "Song Communication"
  - Lyrics: Yūmao
  - Composition: Hitoshi Fujima (Elements Garden)
  - Arrangement: Hitoshi Fujima (Elements Garden)
4. "Jūjika no spread" (十字架のスプレッド)
  - Lyrics: Chiyomaru Shikura
  - Composition: Chiyomaru Shikura
  - Arrangement: Daisuke Kikuta (Elements Graden)
  - Theme song for arcade game Shining Force Cross

== Charts ==
=== Oricon Sales Chart (Japan) ===
| Release | Chart | Peak position | First-day/week sales | Sales total |
|---|---|---|---|---|
| January 13, 2010 | Oricon Daily Charts | 1 | 15,302 (First-day sales) | 94,369 |
| January 13, 2010 | Oricon Weekly Charts | 1 | 53,970 | 94,369 |
| January 13, 2010 | Oricon Monthly Charts | 5 | 78,944 | 94,369 |
| January 13, 2010 | Oricon Yearly Charts | 73 | 93,759 | 94,369 |
