= Starcamp EP =

Single by Nana Mizuki
- Released: (Japan) February 6, 2008
- Recorded: Japan
- Genre: Pop, dance-pop
- Length: 17:41
- Label: King Records
- Songwriter(s): Nana Mizuki

Nana Mizuki singles chronology
"Massive Wonders" (2007)	"Starcamp EP" (2008)	"Trickster" (2008)

"Starcamp EP" is the 17th single by Japanese singer and voice actress Nana Mizuki. It was released on 6 February 2008. "Starcamp EP" contains the opening theme and ending theme for the anime Rosario to Vampire.

== Track listing ==
1. Astrogation
  - Lyrics: Hibiki
  - Composition, arrangement: Jun Suyama
  - Theme in February for TV program Music Fighter
2. COSMIC LOVE
  - Lyrics: Ryōji Sonoda
  - Composition, arrangement: Junpei Fujita (Elements Garden)
  - Opening theme for anime television series Rosario to Vampire.
3. Dancing in the velvet moon
  - Lyrics: Nana Mizuki
  - Composition: Noriyasu Agematsu (Elements Garden)
  - Arrangement: Noriyasu Agematsu (Elements Garden), Masato Nakayama (Elements Garden)
  - Ending theme for anime television series Rosario to Vampire.
4. Soradokei (空時計)
  - Lyrics: SAYURI
  - Composition, arrangement: Tsutomu Ohira

== Charts ==
Chart	Peak position	Sales	Time in chart
Oricon Weekly Singles	#5	58,175	14 weeks
