= Massive Wonders =

Single by Nana Mizuki

from the album Great Activity
- B-side: "Happy Dive, Pray"
- Released: August 22, 2007
- Recorded: Japan
- Genre: pop, dance-pop
- Length: 25:28
- Label: King Records
- Songwriter: Nana Mizuki

Nana Mizuki singles chronology
"Secret Ambition" (2007)	"Massive Wonders" (2007)	"Starcamp EP" (2008)

Music video
- "Massive Wonders" on YouTube

"Massive Wonders" is the 16th single by Japanese singer Nana Mizuki. It was released on 22 August 2007. "Massive Wonders" contains the second opening theme and insert song for the anime Magical Girl Lyrical Nanoha StrikerS.

== Music video ==
Like her previous single, "Secret Ambition", the video features two Nana egos, one being an inactive, innocent one, dressed in white clothing. The other ego, dressed in red clothing, dances and sings. In a high-tech setting, the white-clothed one is held captive and/or hostage by masked uniformed people as her hands are bound together and she is constantly followed and supervised by them. The uniformed people also seem to be monitoring both Nana Mizuki egos on video cameras, but the red-clothed ego seems to dance and sing freely in a separate room by herself (In the edit version the red-clothed ego is wearing sunglasses).

== Track listing ==
1. MASSIVE WONDERS
  - Lyrics: Nana Mizuki
  - Composition, arrangement: Toshiro Yabuki
  - Second opening theme for anime television series Magical Girl Lyrical Nanoha StrikerS.
  - Ending theme in August for Nippon TV show Shiodomei Event-bu (汐留イベント部).
2. Happy Dive
  - Lyrics: Bee'
  - Composition, arrangement: Noriyasu Agematsu (Elements Garden)
  - Ending theme in August for Nippon TV show Radical (ラジかるッ).
3. Pray
  - Lyrics: Hibiki
  - Composition, arrangement: Noriyasu Agematsu (Elements Garden)
  - Insert song for anime television series Magical Girl Lyrical Nanoha StrikerS
4. MASSIVE WONDERS (without NANA)
5. Happy Dive (without NANA)
6. Pray (without NANA)

== Charts ==
Chart	Peak position	Sales	Time in chart
Oricon Weekly Singles	#4	60,204	12 weeks
