= Secret Ambition (song) =

Single by Nana Mizuki

from the album Great Activity
- B-side: "Heart-Shaped Chant, Level Hi"
- Released: Japan: April 18, 2007
- Genre: J-rock, pop rock, J-pop
- Label: King Records
- Songwriters: Lyrics: Nana Mizuki; Composition: Chiyomaru Shikura

Nana Mizuki singles chronology
"Justice to Believe / Aoi Iro" (2006)	"Secret Ambition" (2007)	"Massive Wonders" (2007)

Alternative Cover
- Secret Ambition Cover 2

Music video
- "Secret Ambition" on YouTube

Secret Ambition is a Japanese-language song, and the 15th single from Japanese singer Nana Mizuki. Secret Ambition saw a massive change in Nana Mizuki's music style, dramatically changing from pop and powerpop to an explosive rock sound.

Secret Ambition was the first opening theme for the anime Magical Girl Lyrical Nanoha StrikerS and the B-side, "Heart-Shaped Chant" was the theme song for PS2 game Shining Wind). It is currently her second best-selling single.

== Music video ==
The dark ego in Nana Mizuki's PV for Secret Ambition

The music video of "Secret Ambition" starts off with a scene showing what a white room with a floor covered in looks like a white tea set of china ware. The video features two Nana egos - a "dark" one, and an "innocent" one. The dark one is singing on a stage in dark-coloured clothes, with a dark background and a backing band consisting of guitar and drum players who are also dressed in black or dark colours. The "innocent" one sits crouched in the white room with the cups, in white clothes.

== Track listing ==
1. SECRET AMBITION
  - Lyrics: Nana Mizuki
  - Composition: Chiyomaru Shikura
  - Arrangement: Hitoshi Fujima (Elements Garden)
  - First opening theme for anime television series Magical Girl Lyrical Nanoha Strikers
2. Heart-shaped chant
  - Lyrics: Nana Mizuki
  - Composition, arrangement: Noriyasu Agematsu (Elements Garden)
  - Theme song for PS2 game Shining Wind
3. Level Hi!
  - Lyrics: Chisato Nishimura
  - Composition, arrangement: Shinya Saitou
  - Ending theme for TBS TV series Gacchiri Monday! (がっちりマンデー)
4. SECRET AMBITION (without NANA)
5. Heart-Shaped Chant (without NANA)
6. Level Hi! (without NANA)

== Charts ==
Chart	Peak position	Sales	Time in chart
Oricon Weekly Singles	#2	75,256	19 weeks
