= Magical Girl Lyrical Nanoha Strikers =

Japanese anime television series

- Magical Girl Lyrical Nanoha StrikerS
- Cover from volume 1 of the Magical Girl Lyrical Nanoha Strikers DVD release

魔法少女リリカルなのはStrikerS (Mahō Shōjo Ririkaru Nanoha Sutoraikāzu)
- Genre: Magical girl
- Created by: Masaki Tsuzuki
- Prequels
- Magical Girl Lyrical Nanoha (2004); Magical Girl Lyrical Nanoha A's (2005)
- Manga

Magical Girl Lyrical Nanoha StrikerS THE COMICS
- Written by: Masaki Tsuzuki
- Illustrated by: Kōji Hasegawa
- Published by: Gakken
- Magazine: Megami Magazine
- Original run: September 30, 2006 – December 27, 2007
- Volumes: 2
- Anime television series
- Directed by: Keizō Kusakawa
- Produced by: Akio Mishima; Tatsuya Tanaka
- Written by: Masaki Tsuzuki
- Music by: Hiroaki Sano
- Studio: Seven Arcs
- Licensed by: NA: Discotek Media
- Original network: WTV, MTV, KBS, CTC
- Original run: April 1, 2007 – September 23, 2007
- Episodes: 26
- Sequels
- Magical Girl Lyrical Nanoha ViVid (2015); Magical Girl Lyrical Nanoha Exceeds Gun Blaze Vengeance (2026)
- icon

Magical Girl Lyrical Nanoha StrikerS (魔法少女リリカルなのはStrikerS, Mahō Shōjo Ririkaru Nanoha Sutoraikāzu) is the third season of the Magical Girl Lyrical Nanoha series. This season aired shortly after the promotional event "Lyrical Party III" on April 1, 2007. The series focuses more on team-based battles and bureaucracy rather than individual rivalry and school life, due to the change in character dynamics. The name StrikerS refers to an SS rank given to top mages, much like how A's refers to A rank mages. A special sound stage, under the name of StrikerS Sound stage X was released on October 29, 2008. A manga adaptation, which explored storylines outside of the anime series, ran in Megami Magazine from November 2006 to February 2008.

== Story ==
Taking place ten years after the events of Magical Girl Lyrical Nanoha A's, Nanoha, Fate and Hayate have joined the Time-Space Administration Bureau and form the Lost Property Riot Force 6. Joining them are four new magical recruits, Subaru Nakajima, Teana Lanster, Erio Mondial and Caro. Together, they face up against the Jail Scaglietti, a dangerous criminal after the Lost Logia.

== Media ==
=== Manga ===
A manga adaptation of the anime series was written by Masaki Tsuzuki and illustrated Kōji Hasegawa and was serialized in Megami Magazine between November 2006 and February 2008 issues. The nine chapters were then compiled into two tankōbon volumes by Gakken and published on May 30, 2007 and March 28, 2008, respectively. North American publisher Digital Manga acquired the license for the manga in 2008, but have since cancelled their plans for release and returned the rights to Gakken.

=== Anime ===
Seven Arcs produced a twenty-six episode anime television series directed by Keizō Kusakawa and written by Masaki Tsuzuki. Broadcast on TV Wakayama, it premiered on April 1, 2007, and aired weekly until its conclusion on September 23, 2007. Most of the music was composed by Hiroaki Sano. It features four pieces of theme music: two opening themes performed by Nana Mizuki and two ending themes performed by Yukari Tamura. "Secret Ambition" is the first opening theme for episodes one to seventeen. "Massive Wonders" is the second opening for episodes eighteen to twenty-six. "Hoshizora no Spica" is the first ending theme for episodes one to fourteen. "Beautiful Amulet" is the second ending theme used in episodes fifteen to twenty-six. The series was released across nine Region 2 DVD compilation volumes in Japan. On August 3, 2024, Discotek Media announced they would be releasing the series on Blu-ray in North America.

=== Drama CDs ===
A series of four drama CDs were released by King Records between May 23, 2007, and December 12, 2007, titled Magical Girl Lyrical Nanoha StrikerS Sound Stage 01~04. The first drama CD of the series Magical Girl Lyrical Nanoha StrikerS Sound Stage 01 contained a track titled "Empty-Colored Promise" performed by Chiwa Saitō that was featured as an insert song into the eighth episode of the anime television series. Two additional drama CDs were released as part of volume 84 and 100 of Megami Magazine on May 1, 2007, and September 1, 2008, respectively titled Magical Girl Lyrical Nanoha StrikerS Sound Stage M The StrikerS and Magical Girl Lyrical Nanoha StrikerS Sound Stage M3 respectively. An additional drama CD titled Magical Girl Lyrical Nanoha StrikerS Sound Stage X was released by King Records on October 29, 2008. Its storyline takes place two years after the anime series and covers the events surrounding the four new protagonists introduced.

=== CDs ===
The original soundtrack that contained all the background music used throughout the anime series was released across three soundtrack albums titled Magical Girl Lyrical Nanoha StrikerS Original Soundtrack Plus Vol.1~3 that were bundled with first, fifth, and ninth DVD volumes that compiled the episodes aired for the anime series. In total, the soundtrack consisted of seventy-eight tracks composed by Hiroaki Sano that were released between July 25, 2007, and March 26, 2008. King Records released four maxi singles between April 18, 2007, and August 22, 2007, each containing a theme song featured in the anime television series. One of the maxi singles, "Massive Wonders" by Nana Mizuki, also contained a track titled "Pray", which is featured as an insert song into episode twenty-four of the anime series.
