= Nana Mizuki discography =

- Studio albums: 15
- Compilation albums: 4
- Singles: 42
- Video albums: 24
- Music videos: 61
- Other albums: 147
- Other video albums: 7

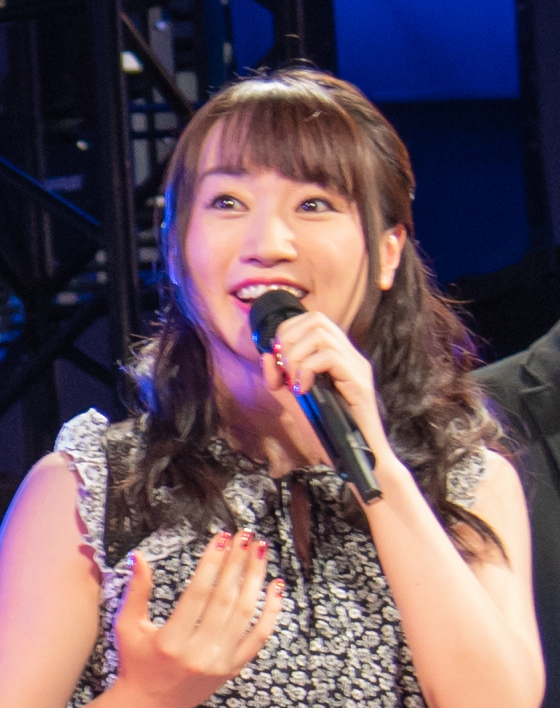
Nana Mizuki in 2018

The discography of the voice actress and J-pop singer Nana Mizuki consists of 15 studio albums, 4 compilation albums, 42 singles, 24 video releases, over 60 official music videos, and over 100 other appearances. The first release with Mizuki as a singer was the "Girl's Age" image song single in 1998 for the fictional character Chisato Kadokura from the NOëL video game series. Mizuki would not release her debut single "Omoi" until 2000, which was followed by two more singles and her debut album Supersonic Girl in 2001. Supersonic Girl was Mizuki's first release to chart on the Japanese Oricon albums chart, peaking at No. 60. Mizuki released one album a year for the next three years, starting with Magic Attraction (2002), followed by Dream Skipper (2003), and Alive & Kicking (2004). "Innocent Starter" (2004), one of two singles from Alive & Kicking, was her first single to reach the top 10 Oricon singles chart, peaking at No. 9.

Mizuki's fifth album Hybrid Universe (2006) was her first album to reach the top 5 Oricon albums chart, achieving a peak at No. 3. "Eternal Blaze" (2005), one of three singles from Hybrid Universe, was her first single to peak at No. 2. Mizuki has continued to show success in her single releases: every single released after "Eternal Blaze" has achieved a peak in the top 5 Oricon singles chart, except for "Super Generation" (2006), which peaked at No. 6, and "Metanoia" (2019), which peaked at No. 8. Mizuki's 20th single "Mugen" (2009) marked her tenth single to reach the top 10 on Oricon's singles chart. Mizuki released two albums in 2007, her first compilation album The Museum, which peaked at No. 5 on Oricon, and her sixth studio album Great Activity, which peaked at No. 2 on Oricon.

In 2009, Mizuki released her seventh album Ultimate Diamond, which was the first album released by a Japanese voice actress to top the weekly Oricon albums chart since its inception in 1968. A similar record was set with the release of Mizuki's 21st single "Phantom Minds" (2010), which was the first single released by a Japanese voice actress to top the weekly Oricon singles chart since its inception. Mizuki released her eighth studio album Impact Exciter in 2010, which peaked at No. 2 on Oricon. Her second compilation album, The Museum II (2011), peaked at No. 3 on Oricon. Mizuki's next four studio albums were Rockbound Neighbors (2012), Supernal Liberty (2014), Smashing Anthems (2015) and Neogene Creation (2016). Her third compilation album, The Museum III, was released in 2018.

== Albums ==
=== Studio albums ===
Year	#	Album details	Peak Oricon chart positions	Sales (JPN)	Certifications (sales thresholds)
2001	1	Supersonic Girl: Released: December 5, 2001; Label: King (KICS-931); Format: CD	60	5,090	
2002	2	Magic Attraction: Released: November 6, 2002; Label: King (KICS-979); Format: CD	21	22,051	
2003	3	Dream Skipper: Released: November 27, 2003; Label: King (KICS-1043); Format: CD	25	19,518	
2004	4	Alive & Kicking: Released: December 8, 2004; Label: King (KICS-1125); Format: CD	17	32,890	
2006	5	Hybrid Universe: Released: May 3, 2006; Label: King (KIZC-1–2); Format: CD, CD+DVD	3	51,430	
2007	6	Great Activity: Released: November 14, 2007; Label: King (KICS-1339, KICS-91339); Format: CD, CD+DVD	2	66,634	
2009	7	Ultimate Diamond: Released: June 3, 2009; Label: King (KICS-1470, KICS-91470); Format: CD, CD+DVD	1	104,902	JP: Gold
2010	8	Impact Exciter: Released: July 7, 2010; Label: King (KICS-1564, KICS-91564); Format: CD, CD+DVD	2	126,175	JP: Gold
2012	9	Rockbound Neighbors: Released: December 12, 2012; Label: King (KICS-1847, KICS-91847, KICS-91848); Format: CD, CD+DVD, CD+BD	2	139,004	JP: Gold
2014	10	Supernal Liberty: Released: April 16, 2014; Label: King (KICS-3036, KICS-93037, KICS-93036); Format: CD, CD+DVD, CD+BD	1	100,244	JP: Gold
2015	11	Smashing Anthems: Released: November 11, 2015; Label: King (KICS-3297, KICS-93298, KICS-93297); Format: CD, CD+DVD, CD+BD	2	82,273	JP: Gold
2016	12	Neogene Creation: Released: December 21, 2016; Label: King (KICS-3456, KICS-93456, KICS-93457); CD, CD+DVD, CD+BD	2	64,493	
2019	13	Cannonball Running: Released: December 11, 2019; Label: King	3	49,291	
2022	14	Delighted Reviver: Released: July 6, 2022; Label: King	5	30,235	
2025	15	Contemporary Emotion: Released: March 19, 2025; Label: King	3	29,206	

=== Compilation albums ===
Year	Album details	Peak Oricon chart positions	Sales (JPN)	Certifications
2007	The Museum: Released: February 7, 2007; Label: King (KIZC-3–4); Format: CD, CD+DVD	5	66,828	JP: Gold
2011	The Museum II: Released: November 23, 2011; Label: King; Format: CD+BD, CD+DVD	3	129,764	JP: Gold
2018	The Museum III: Released: January 10, 2018; Label: King; Format: CD+BD, CD+DVD	2	74,925	
2026	The Museum IV: Released: January 21, 2026; Label: King; Format: CD, CD+BD	8	25,661	

== Singles ==
List of singles as lead artist
Title	Year	Peak chart positions		Sales	Certifications	Album
Title	Year	JPN	JPN Hot 100	Sales	Certifications	Album
"Omoi"	2000	184	—	JPN: 500		Supersonic Girl
"Heaven Knows"	2001	—	—			Supersonic Girl
"The Place of Happiness"	2001	—	—			Supersonic Girl
"Love & History"	2002	49	—	JPN: 5,600		Magic Attraction
"Power Gate"	2002	50	—	JPN: 3,900		Magic Attraction
"Suddenly: Meguriaete" / "Brilliant Star"	2002	20	—	JPN: 13,800		Magic Attraction
"New Sensation"	2003	20	—	JPN: 13,900		Dream Skipper
"Still In the Groove"	2003	17	—	JPN: 16,100		Dream Skipper
"Panorama"	2004	14	—	JPN: 14,300		Alive & Kicking
"Innocent Starter"	2004	9	—	JPN: 25,300	RIAJ (dig.): Gold	Alive & Kicking
"Wild Eyes"	2005	13	—	JPN: 21,600	RIAJ (dig.): Gold	Hybrid Universe
"Eternal Blaze"	2005	2	—	JPN: 48,300	RIAJ (phy.): Gold; RIAJ (dig.): Platinum; RIAJ (ringtone): Gold	Hybrid Universe
"Super Generation"	2006	6	—	JPN: 31,500		Hybrid Universe
"Justice to Believe" / "Aoi Iro"	2006	4	—	JPN: 41,300		Great Activity
"Secret Ambition"	2007	2	—	JPN: 75,200	RIAJ (phy.): Gold; RIAJ (dig.): Gold	Great Activity
"Massive Wonders"	2007	4	—	JPN: 60,700	RIAJ (dig.): Gold	Great Activity
"Trickster"	2008	2	7	JPN: 82,300	RIAJ (phy.): Gold	Ultimate Diamond
"Shin'ai"	2009	2	7	JPN: 62,900	RIAJ (dig.): Gold	Ultimate Diamond
"Mugen"	2009	3	4	JPN: 65,000		Impact Exciter
"Phantom Minds"	2010	1	3	JPN: 94,400	RIAJ (dig.): Gold	Impact Exciter
"Silent Bible"	2010	3	5	JPN: 72,100		Impact Exciter
"Scarlet Knight"	2011	2	6	JPN: 87,200	RIAJ (phy.): Gold; RIAJ (dig.): Gold	The Museum II
"Pop Master"	2011	3	5	JPN: 73,600		The Museum II
"Junketsu Paradox"	2011	3	3	JPN: 72,700		The Museum II
"Synchrogazer"	2012	2	2	JPN: 79,500	RIAJ (dig.): Platinum	Rockbound Neighbors
"Bright Stream"	2012	2	2	JPN: 102,900	RIAJ (phy.): Gold; RIAJ (dig.): Gold	Rockbound Neighbors
"Preserved Roses" (with T.M.Revolution)	2013	2	1	JPN: 178,000	RIAJ (phy.): Gold; RIAJ (dig.): Platinum	The Museum III
"Vitalization"	2013	3	3	JPN: 81,800	RIAJ (phy.): Gold; RIAJ (dig.): Gold	Supernal Liberty
"Kakumei Dualism" (with T.M.Revolution)	2013	2	2	JPN: 126,000	RIAJ (phy.): Gold; RIAJ (dig.): Gold	The Museum III
"Kindan no Resistance"	2014	5	5	JPN: 60,500	RIAJ (dig.): Gold	Smashing Anthems
"Eden"	2015	2	2	JPN: 60,500		Smashing Anthems
"Angel Blossom"	2015	4	5	JPN: 51,700		Smashing Anthems
"Exterminate"	2015	3	2	JPN: 56,800	RIAJ (dig.): Gold	Smashing Anthems
"Starting Now!"	2016	3	3	JPN: 44,100		Neogene Creation
"Destiny's Prelude"	2017	3	3	JPN: 41,500		The Museum III
"Testament"	2017	2	2	JPN: 44,300		The Museum III
"Blue Rose"	2018	—	— (Note: "Blue Rose" did not enter the Billboard Japan Hot 100, but peaked at number 27 on the Download Songs chart.)			Cannonball Running
"Never Surrender"	2018	5	6	JPN: 44,200		Cannonball Running
"Rebellion"	2019	—	67			Cannonball Running
"Metanoia"	2019	8	11	JPN: 36,500		Cannonball Running
"Final Commander"	2019	—	60			Cannonball Running
"Kōmori Bat wa Good na Shinshi"	2019	—	— (Note: "Kōmori Bat wa Good na Shinshi" did not enter the Billboard Japan Hot 100, but peaked at number 87 on the Download Songs chart.)			NHK Minna no Uta compilation
"All For Love" / "Daybreakers"	2019	—	—			Cannonball Running
"Fire Scream"	2020	2	18	JPN: 28,700		Delighted Reviver
"No Rain, No Rainbow"	2020	2	— (Note: "No Rain, No Rainbow" did not enter the Billboard Japan Hot 100, but peaked at number 48 on the Download Songs chart.)	JPN: 28,700		Delighted Reviver
"Link or Chains"	2021	—	— (Note: "Link or Chains" did not enter the Billboard Japan Hot 100, but peaked at number 45 on the Download Songs chart.)			Delighted Reviver
"Get Up! Shout!"	2021	5	54	JPN: 19,000		Delighted Reviver
"Red Breeze"	2021	—	— (Note: "Red Breeze" did not enter the Billboard Japan Hot 100, but peaked at number 16 on the Download Songs chart.)			Delighted Reviver
"Double Suffle"	2022	—	— (Note: "Double Suffle" did not enter the Billboard Japan Hot 100, but peaked at number 14 on the Download Songs chart.)			Delighted Reviver
"Sugar Doughnuts"	2023	—	— (Note: "Sugar Doughnuts" did not enter the Billboard Japan Hot 100, but peaked at number 31 on the Download Songs chart.)			Contemporary Emotion
"Turn the World"	2023	—	— (Note: "Turn the World" did not enter the Billboard Japan Hot 100, but peaked at number 34 on the Download Songs chart.)			Contemporary Emotion
"Adrenalized"	2024	7	— (Note: "Adrenalized" did not enter the Billboard Japan Hot 100, but peaked at number 10 on the Top Singles chart, and at number 62 on the Download Songs chart.)	JPN: 14,200		Contemporary Emotion
"Electric Trick"	2025	—	— (Note: "Electric Trick" did not enter the Billboard Japan Hot 100, but peaked at number 58 on the Download Songs chart.)			Contemporary Emotion
"Crimson Bullet"	2026	7	— (Note: "Crimson Bullet" did not enter the Billboard Japan Hot 100, but peaked at number 9 on the Top Singles Sales chart, and at number 14 on the Download Songs chart.)	JPN: 11,000		TBA
"Akatsuki no Hoshi"	2026	—	—			TBA
"—" denotes a recording that did not chart or was not released in that territory.

== Video albums ==
Year	Video details	Peak Oricon chart positions
2003	Nana Clips 1: Released: January 22, 2003; Label: King (KIBM-40); Format: DVD	44
2003	Nana Mizuki Live Attraction the DVD: Released: March 26, 2003; Label: King (KIBM-44); Format: DVD	30
2004	Nana Mizuki Live Skipper Countdown the DVD and More: Released: March 3, 2004; Label: King (KIBM-65–66); Format: DVD	16
2004	Nana Clips 2: Released: July 7, 2004; Label: King (KIBM-68); Format: DVD	21
2005	Nana Mizuki Live Rainbow at Budokan: Released: April 6, 2005; Label: King (KIBM-82–83); Format: DVD	17
2006	Nana Clips 3: Released: January 18, 2006; Label: King (KIBM-103); Format: DVD	3
2006	Nana Mizuki Livedom -Birth- at Budokan: Released: June 21, 2006; Label: King (KIBM-112–114); Format: DVD	13
2007	Nana Mizuki Live Museum x Universe: Released: June 6, 2007; Label: King (KIBM-140–143); Format: DVD	5
2008	Nana Mizuki Live Formula at Saitama Super Arena: Released: May 9, 2008; Label: King (KIBM-167–169); Format: DVD	4
2008	Nana Clips 4: Released: July 2, 2008; Label: King (KIBM-170); Format: DVD	3
2008	Nana Mizuki Live Fighter: Blue Side: Released: December 25, 2008; Label: King (KIBM-192–193); Format: DVD	18
2008	Nana Mizuki Live Fighter: Red Side: Released: December 25, 2008; Label: King (KIBM-194–195); Format: DVD	16
2008	Nana Mizuki Live Fighter Blue x Red Side: Released: December 25, 2008; Label: King (KIXM-1–2); Format: Blu-ray Disc	15
2009	Nana Mizuki Live Diamond x Fever: Released: December 23, 2009; Label: King (KIBM-221–225); Format: DVD, Blu-ray Disc	12 (DVD)
2010	Nana Clips 5: Released: October 27, 2010; Label: King - DVD (KIBM-258-259), BD (KIXM-20); Format: DVD, Blu-ray Disc	6 (DVD); 1 (BD)
2010	Nana Mizuki Live Games x Academy: Red: Released: December 22, 2010; Label: King - DVD (KIBM-262-266), BD (KIXM-22-23); Format: DVD, Blu-ray Disc	27 (DVD); 2 (BD)
2010	Nana Mizuki Live Games x Academy: Blue: Released: December 22, 2010; Label: King - DVD (KIBM-267-271), BD (KIXM-24-25); Format: DVD, Blu-ray Disc	26 (DVD); 1 (BD)
2011	Nana Mizuki Live Grace -Orchestra-: Released: October 5, 2011; Label: King - DVD (KIBM-291-292), BD (KIXM-27); Format: DVD, Blu-ray Disc	2 (DVD); 1 (BD)
2012	Nana Mizuki Live Castle x Journey -Queen-: Released: May 2, 2012; Label: King - DVD (KIBM-311-315), BD (KIXM-54-55); Format: DVD, Blu-ray Disc	7 (DVD)
2012	Nana Mizuki Live Castle x Journey -King-: Released: May 2, 2012; Label: King - DVD (KIBM-316-320), BD (KIXM-56-57); Format: DVD, Blu-ray Disc	8 (DVD)
2013	Nana Mizuki Live Grace -Opus II- x Union: Released: May 1, 2013; Label: King - DVD (KIBM-352-355), BD (KIXM-81-82); Format: DVD, Blu-ray Disc	5 (DVD)
2013	Nana Clips 6: Released: December 11, 2013; Label: King - DVD (KIBM-383-384), BD (KIXM-132); Format: DVD, Blu-ray Disc	4 (DVD)
2014	Nana Mizuki Live Circus x Circus+ x Winter Festa: Released: May 28, 2014; Label: King - DVD (KIBM-432-438), BD (KIXM-161-164); Format: DVD, Blu-ray Disc	5 (DVD)
2015	Nana Mizuki Live Flight x Flight+: Released: January 14, 2015; Label: King - DVD (KIBM-483-488), BD (KIXM-185-188); Format: DVD, Blu-ray Disc	5 (DVD)
2016	Nana Clips 7: Released: April 6, 2016; Label: King - DVD (KIBM-558-559), BD (KIXM-229); Format: Blu-ray	6 (DVD); 3 (BD)
2016	Nana Mizuki Live Galaxy: Frontier: Released: September 14, 2016; Label: King - DVD (KIBM-589-591), BD (KIXM-245-246); Format: Blu-ray	1
2017	Nana Mizuki Live Park × MTV Unplugged: Nana Mizuki: Released: March 8, 2017; Label: King - DVD (KIBM-645-649), BD (KIXM-271-273); Format: DVD, Blu-Ray Disc	10 (DVD); 3 (BD)

== Music videos ==
Year	#	Song	Director
2001	1	"Heaven Knows"	Nobuhiro Makino
2002	2	"Love & History"	Nobuhiro Makino
2002	3	"Power Gate"	Toshiro Yabuki
2002	4	"Suddenly: Meguriaete"	Toshiro Yabuki
2002	5	"Brilliant Star"	Toshimichi Isoe
2003	6	"New Sensation"	Toshiro Yabuki
2003	7	"Still In the Groove"	Toshiro Yabuki
2003	8	"Koishiteru..."	Tsutomu Ohira
2003	9	"What Cheer?"	Takahiro Iida
2004	10	"Panorama"	Tsutomu Ohira
2004	11	"Cherish"	Toshiro Yabuki
2004	12	"Innocent Starter"	Tsutomu Ohira
2004	13	"Miracle Flight"	Toshiro Yabuki
2005	14	"Wild Eyes"	Junpei Fujita
2005	15	"Eternal Blaze"	Noriyasu Agematsu
2005	16	"Rush & Dash!"	Hitoshi Fujima
2006	17	"Super Generation"	Junpei Fujita
2006	18	"Zankō no Gaia"	Hitoshi Fujima
2006	19	"Justice to Believe"	Noriyasu Agematsu
2006	20	"Aoi Iro"	Kazuma Jo
2007	21	"Crystal Letter"	Hitoshi Fujima
2007	22	"Secret Ambition"	Kazuma Jo
2007	23	"Massive Wonders"	Junpei Fujita
2007	24	"Orchestral Fantasia"	Noriyasu Agematsu
2008	25	"Astrogation"	Jun Suyama
2008	26	"Cosmic Love"	Junpei Fujita
2008	27	"Trickster"	Noriyasu Agematsu
2008	28	"Discotheque"	Noriyasu Agematsu
2009	29	"Shin'ai"	Hitoshi Fujima
2009	30	"Etsuraku Camellia"	Wataru Takeishi
2009	31	"Mugen"	Junpei Fujita
2010	32	"Phantom Minds"	Kohji Satoh
2010	33	"Silent Bible"	Wataru Takeishi
2010	34	"Musterion"	Masato Nakayama
2010	35	"Koi no Yokushiryoku"	Daisuke Kikuta
2010	36	"July 7"	Hitoshi Fujima
2011	37	"Scarlet Knight"	Hitoshi Fujima
2011	38	"Pop Master"	Hitoshi Fujima
2011	39	"Junketsu Paradox"	Junpei Fujita
2012	40	"Synchrogazer"	Noriyasu Agematsu
2012	41	"Metro Baroque"	Wataru Takeishi
2012	42	"Bright Stream"	Hitoshi Fujima
2012	43	"Lovely Fruit"	Noriyasu Agematsu
2013	44	"Vitalization"	Noriyasu Agematsu
2014	45	"Appassionato"	Hitoshi Fujima
2014	46	"Kindan no Resistance"	Kohji Satoh
2015	47	"Eden"	Hitoshi Fujima
2015	48	"Angel Blossom"	Hitoshi Fujima
2015	49	"Exterminate"	Hitoshi Fujima
2015	50	"Super Man"	Kohji Satou
2016	51	"Pray"	Junpei Fujita
2016	52	"Starting Now!"	Junpei Fujita
2016	53	"Zettaiteki Kōfukuron"	Hitoshi Fujima
2017	54	"Destiny's Prelude"	Kohji Satou
2017	55	"Testament"	Junpei Fujita
2018	56	"Suiren"	Junya Imai
2018	57	"What You Want"	ats-
2018	58	"Never Surrender"	Yusuke Kato
2019	59	"Metanoia"	
2020	60	"Daybreakers"	
2020	61	"Fire Scream"	

== Other album appearances ==
Year	Song(s)	Album	Notes	Ref.
1998	"Girl's Age"	"Girl's Age"	Image song single for the Microsoft Windows program "NOëL Task Launcher: Chisato da yo!".	
1998	"Merry X'mas"	NOëL: La neige Rendez-vous	Image song album for the video game NOëL: La neige.	
1998	"Sora to Kokoro to..." "Yūdachi" "Merry X'mas" "Thermidorian" "Monologue" "Girl's Age"	NOëL: La neige Départ Chisato×Nana	Image song album for the video game NOëL: La neige; "Merry X'mas", "Monologue", and "Girl's Age" are featured as remixed versions.	
1999	"Jikū no Kanata e" "Kimitte Winking Shining Star"	Space-Time Detective Genshi-kun Original Soundtrack Dacchi!	Theme songs to the anime television series Flint the Time Detective.	
1999	"Dear. Friend" "Send You My Love" "Our Song"	Webcast Program Nana Channel in Oct. 1999 featuring Nana Mizuki	Theme songs to the Internet radio program Nana Channel.	
1999	"Natural" "Tsubasa o Hirogete"	Webcast Program Nana Channel in Nov.-Dec. 1999 featuring Nana Mizuki	Theme songs to the Internet radio program Nana Channel.	
2000	"Romantic Heart" "Little Witch's Heart ver.R"	Parfait Song Collection	Image song theme songs for the video game Little Witch Lynette: Swan no Namida Rhapsody; included in the Parfait Fan Box.	
2000	"Yūyakegumo no Mukō ni"	"Yūyakegumo no Mukō ni / Kimi ga Iru kara"	Image song single for the anime television series Happy Lesson.	
2000	"Omoi"	Shōnen Shikaron	Image song released on a drama CD for the Shōnen Shikaron manga series.	
2001	"Ōji-sama to Amai Hoshi"	Sister Princess: 12-nin no Tenshitachi	Image song album for the anime television series Sister Princess.	
2001	"Let's Sing a Song"	Vintage	Theme song album for the radio program ES Hour Radio no Ojikan; "Let's Sing a Song" was sung by eight singers, including Nana Mizuki.	
2001	"Watashi no Uta: Shinobu & Nyamo Ver." "Nyamo-chan no Uta"	Kimi Sakura Chiru Nakare!! Love Hina Spring Special	Soundtrack to the anime television series Love Hina; "Nyamo-chan no Uta" is included as two remix versions.	
2001	"Suki Tōru Yume"	Angel Jukebox	Soundtrack to the anime television series Sister Princess.	
2001	"Otomegokoro wa Mangekyō: Kaleidoscope" "Kiseki no Hito"	Kaleidoscope	Image song album for the anime television series Sister Princess.	
2001	"Shiawase Taishō"	Mamimume Mogacho Ongaku-shū	Soundtrack to the anime television series Mamimume Mogacho.	
2001	"Tōi Kono Sora kara"	Memories Off 2nd Mini Album Collection Vol. 1 Tōi Kono Sora kara / Shirakawa Hotaru	Image song album for the visual novel Memories Off 2nd.	
2001	"Namida Iro"	Happy Lesson Hara Hara Music CD	Image song album for the anime television series Happy Lesson.	
2002	"Birdie, Birdie"	"Success, Success"	Theme song single for the anime television series Seven of Seven.	
2002	"Tōi Kono Sora kara" "Orgel and Piano"	Memo Off First Concert	Theme song for the Memories Off video game series.	
2002	"New Frontier"	Shichinin no Nana: Side Story of Nana Ongaku no Jikan	Image song album for the anime television series Seven of Seven.	
2002	"Hana, Hoshi, Sora"	Shaman King Vocal Collection: Uta no Manjien	Image song album for the anime television series Shaman King.	
2002	"Tōi Kono Sora kara" "Orgel and Piano"	Memories Off 2nd Vocal Collection +α!!	Image song album for the Memories Off video game series.	
2002	"Hamasaki Gakuen Kōka Seishō" "Futatsu no Kokoro wa" "Amenochi Omoide"	Minna de Tsukuru Memo Off CD!!	Image song album for the Memories Off video game series.	
2002	"Birdie, Birdie"	Seven of Seven Original Soundtrack: Side Story of Nana II	Soundtrack for the anime television series Seven of Seven.	
2002	"Tōi Kono Sora kara"	Dream Melodies Iya: Scitron Discs Girls Vocal Best Selection	Image song album for the Memories Off video game series.	
2002	"Orgel and Piano"	Dream Melodies Moe: Scitron Discs Girls Vocal Best Selection	Image song album for the Memories Off video game series.	
2002	"Brilliant Star"	Shōnen Shikaron Plus	Image song released on a drama CD for the Shōnen Shikaron Plus manga series.	
2002	"Replay Machine"	Omoide Kawaru Kimi: Memories Off Sound Collection	Image song album for the Memories Off video game series.	
2002	"Okujō Dance Paradise"	"Happy Lesson Character CD 1 Rokumatsuri Minazuki"	Image song single for the anime television series Happy Lesson.	
2003	"Yasashii Mori" "Ai no Choco Souffle" "Akai Akai Hana: The Wild Flower"	Angelic Concert Vocal Collection	Image song album for the video game Angelic Concert.	
2003	"Nocturne"	Memories Off 2nd Sound Collection	Soundtrack to the Memories Off 2nd visual novel	
2003	"Okujō Dance Paradise"	Happy Lesson Zoku Zoku Music CD	Image song album for the anime television series Happy Lesson.	
2003	"Replay Machine"	Omoide Kawaru Kimi: Memories Off Vocal Collection	Image song album for the Memories Off video game series.	
2003	"Kokoro ni Saku Hana no Yō ni" "Mirai Kono Hoshi de" "Orgel and Piano" "Tōi Kono Sora kara"	Game Vocal Best: Shikura Chiyomaru Gakkyō-shū Vol.1	Image song compilation album of songs composed by Chiyomaru Shikura.	
2003	"Replay Machine"	Game Vocal Best: Shikura Chiyomaru Gakkyō-shū Vol.2	Image song compilation album of songs composed by Chiyomaru Shikura.	
2003	"Oh Yes!"	Sakura: Setsugekka Gekichū Uta Zenshū	Image song album for the video game Sakura: Setsugekka.	
2003	"Sono Kiseki wa Eikyū ni" "Merry Very X'mas"	Sister Princess: Christmas Song Collection	Image song album for the anime television series Sister Princess. The songs are sung in collaboration by the twelve main cast members.	
2003	"Oshiete Sensei-san" "Kanransha" "Haru Uta: Kururu" "Shiki Uta: Binzume Yōsei"	Four Seasons	Image and theme song album for the anime television series Bottle Fairy.	
2004	"Kiss Me Kiss Me"	Melody	Image song album for the anime television series Happy Lesson.	
2004	"Drive Away Dream"	OVA Hourglass of Summer Sound Collection	Image song album for the original video animation (OVA) series Hourglass of Summer.	
2004	"Panorama"	Lost Aya Sophia Original Soundtrack	Soundtrack to the video game Lost Aya Sophia.	
2004	"Oshiete Sensei-san: Natsu"	Asa Hiru Yoru	Image song album for the anime television series Bottle Fairy.	
2004	"Shinjitsu o Mitsumete"	Kaiketsu! Osaba Kiina Original Soundtrack Album	Soundtrack to the video game Kaiketsu! Osaba Kiina.	
2004	"Soredemo Kimi o Omoidasu kara"	Memories Off: Sorekara Sound Collection	Soundtrack to the visual novel Memories Off: Sorekara.	
2004	"Nocturne" "Drive Away Dream"	Game Vocal Best: Shikura Chiyomaru Gakkyō-shū Vol.3	Image song compilation album of songs composed by Chiyomaru Shikura.	
2004	"With: Chiisana Chikara"	Ragnarok the Animation Soundtrack & Character Songs	Theme songs to the anime television series Ragnarok the Animation.	
2004	"Dare yori mo Kitto: For Memories"	Minna de Tsukuru Memo Off CD!! Part 2	Image song album for the Memories Off video game series.	
2004	"Ikinari Kiss" "Shinobu Ondo"	Ninin ga Shinobuden Soundtrack & Songs	Theme songs to the anime television series Ninin ga Shinobuden.	
2004	"Soredemo Kimi o Omoidasu kara"	Memories Off: Sorekara Vocal Collection	Image song album to the visual novel Memories Off: Sorekara.	
2005	"Wish"	Magical Girl Lyrical Nanoha Sound Stage 02	Theme song for a drama CD for the anime television series Magical Girl Lyrical Nanoha.	
2005	"Kimi Iro 100%"	Kimi Iro 100%	Image song album for the anime television series Strawberry 100%.	
2005	"Orgel and Piano" "Nocturne" "Replay Machine" "Soredemo Kimi o Omoidasu kara"	Memo Off Theme Song Collection	Theme song collection album for the Memories Off video game series.	
2005	"Replay Machine"	Memories Off Collectors Box: Omoide ni Kawaru Kimi Memories Off kara Memories Off: Sorekara	Box set containing previously released image song album collections for the Memories Off video game series.	
2005	"Tatta Hitotsu no Sora"	Tactics Sound File Vol. 2	Soundtrack to the anime television series Tactics.	
2005	"Skyblue Gradation"	Magical Girl Lyrical Nanoha Sound Stage 03	Theme song for the drama CD for the anime television series Magical Girl Lyrical Nanoha.	
2005	"Innocent Starter"	Magical Girl Lyrical Nanoha Original Soundtrack	Soundtrack to the anime television series Magical Girl Lyrical Nanoha.	
2005	"Oneness"	"Oneness"	Theme song to the concert Animelo Summer Live 2005: The Bridge.	
2005	"Lost Days"	Paradise	Image song album for the anime television series Koi Koi Seven.	
2005	"Kokoro Capsule"	Strawberry 100% Character File 3 Minamoto Yui	Image song single for the anime television series Strawberry 100%.	
2005	"Wild Eyes"	Basilisk: Kōga Ninpō Chō Onemaki Daini Shō	Soundtrack to the anime television series Basilisk.	
2005	"Purism×Egoist"	Purism×Egoist Vol.1: Ponwari School Days Zenpen	Theme song for the drama CD for the visual novel Purism×Egoist.	
2006	"Kimi Iro 100%" "Kokoro Capsule"	Strawberry 100% Original Soundtrack	Soundtrack to the anime television series Strawberry 100%.	
2006	"Tsubasa"	Magical Girl Lyrical Nanoha A's Sound Stage 02	Theme song for the drama CD for the anime television series Magical Girl Lyrical Nanoha A's.	
2006	"Kaze ni Mau Hana"	Magical Girl Lyrical Nanoha A's Sound Stage 03	Theme song for the drama CD for the anime television series Magical Girl Lyrical Nanoha A's.	
2006	"Ohayō" "Ai ni Oide Ai ni Oide"	"Ohayō / Ai ni Oide Ai ni Oide"	Theme song single for the anime television series Yoshinaga-san Chi no Gargoyle.	
2006	"Outride"	"Outride"	Theme song to the concert Animelo Summer Live 2006: Outride.	
2006	"Promise You" "Ai ni Oide Ai ni Oide: Riri Version"	Yoshinaga-san Chi no Gargoyle Character Song Riri	Image song single for the anime television series Yoshinaga-san Chi no Gargoyle.	
2006	"Tsubasa" "Skyblue Gradation" "Kaze ni Mau Hana" "Wish"	Magical Girl Lyrical Nanoha A's Sound Stage Vocal Best Collection	Image song album for the drama CD series for the anime television series Magical Girl Lyrical Nanoha A's; each of the tracks are featured as remixed versions.	
2006	"Sunao Princess"	Tsuyokiss Cool×Sweet Complete Selection	Soundtrack to the anime television series Tsuyokiss.	
2006	"Kamarete mo Suki na Hito"	Rosario + Vampire 2	Theme song for the drama CD for the manga series Rosario + Vampire.	
2006	"Lightning Arc"	Twinkle Saber Nova: Hirusagari no Whisper	Theme song for the drama CD for the manga series Twinkle Saber Nova.	
2006	"Kei no Uta"	Inukami! Special CD Go!	Image song for the anime television series Inukami!; the song was bundled with the special edition version of the fifth DVD compilation volume for the anime.	
2006	"Go Smile"	Kiba Original Soundtrack Vol. 1	Soundtrack to the anime television series Kiba.	
2007	"Justice to Believe (ver. Beginning)"	Wild Arms the Vth Vanguard Original Score Vol. 1	Soundtrack to the video game Wild Arms 5.	
2007	"Justice to Believe (ver. Ground Zero)"	Wild Arms the Vth Vanguard Original Score Vol. 2	Soundtrack to the video game Wild Arms 5.	
2007	"Kaze no Fuku Basho"	Kiba Original Soundtrack Vol. 2	Soundtrack to the anime television series Kiba.	
2007	"Generation-A"	"Generation-A"	Theme song to the concert Animelo Summer Live 2007: Generation-A.	
2007	"Present"	Magical Girl Lyrical Nanoha Strikers Sound Stage 02	Theme song for the drama CD for the anime television series Magical Girl Lyrical Nanoha Strikers.	
2007	"Fiat lux: Hikari Are"	Tales of Symphonia The Animation Bonus Disc II Collector's Edition Original Soundtrack	Soundtrack to the OVA series Tales of Symphonia.	
2007	"Watashi Dake no Melody"	Meta-morphose	Image song album for the anime television series Shinkyoku Sōkai Polyphonica.	
2007	"Uchi e Kaerō"	Tales of Symphonia The Animation Bonus Disc III Collector's Edition Original Soundtrack	Soundtrack to the OVA series Tales of Symphonia.	
2007	"Meikyū Butterfly" "Blue Moon"	"Meikyū Butterfly"	Image song single for the anime television series Shugo Chara!.	
2007	"Endless Chain"	Magical Girl Lyrical Nanoha Strikers Sound Stage 04	Theme song for the drama CD for the anime television series Magical Girl Lyrical Nanoha Strikers.	
2007	"Omoi no Yukue"	Tales of Symphonia The Animation Bonus Disc IV Collector's Edition Original Soundtrack & Mini Drama	Soundtrack to the OVA series Tales of Symphonia.	
2007	"Crystal Heart"	Shōkan Shōjo: Elemental Girl Calling Character Song Mini Album	Image song album for the video game Shōkan Shōjo: Elemental Girl Calling.	
2008	"Aoki Hikari no Hate"	"Ayakashi Characters Vol.1 Yoake Eim"	Image song single for the visual novel Ayakashi.	
2008	"Akai Jōnetstu" "Akai Sweet Pea"	"Rosario + Vampire Character Song 1 Akashiya Moka"	Image song single for the anime television series Rosario + Vampire.	
2008	"Soba ni Ite ne: Wanna Be With You"	Dragonaut Drama & Character Song vol.2	Drama CD and image song album for the anime television series Dragonaut: The Resonance.	
2008	"Gin'iro no Hane"	Mushi-Uta Bug	Image song for the anime television series Mushi-Uta; the song was bundled with the sixth DVD compilation volume for the anime.	
2008	"Tsumetai Rosary" "Toki no Kawa o Koete"	"Rosario + Vampire Character Song 6 The Capucchu"	Image song single for the anime television series Rosario + Vampire.	
2008	"Mirai Travel"	Minami-ke Biyori	Image song album for the anime television series Minami-ke.	
2008	"Sora ni Naru Tsubasa"	Allison & Lillia Drama CD I: Allison to Wil Another Story	Theme song for the drama CD for the anime television series Allison & Lillia.	
2008	"Aoki Hikari no Hate"	Ayakashi The Best Vocal Collection	Image song album for the anime television series Ayakashi.	
2008	"Yells: It's a Beautiful Life"	"Yells: It's a Beautiful Life"	Theme song to the concert Animelo Summer Live 2008: Challenge.	
2008	"Black Diamond"	"Black Diamond"	Image song single for the anime television series Shugo Chara!; two versions of the song are included.	
2008	"Anata ni Capu chu!" "Desire: Jōnetsu"	"Rosario + Vampire Capu2 Character Song 1 Akashiya Moka"	Image song single for the anime television series Rosario + Vampire Capu2.	
2008	"Yakusoku no Katachi"	Allison & Lillia Drama CD II: Lillia to Treize Another Story	Theme song for the drama CD for the anime television series Allison & Lillia.	
2008	"Shalala: Watashi ni Kureta Mono"	"Rosario + Vampire Capu2 Character Song 7 The Capucchu"	Image song single for the anime television series Rosario + Vampire Capu2.	
2008	"Cosmic Love" "Discotheque" "Dancing in the Velvet Moon" "Trinity Cross"	Rosario + Vampire Original Soundtrack	Soundtrack to the anime television series Rosario + Vampire.	
2009	"I'm In Love"	Itazura na Kiss Original Soundtrack & More ItaKiss Station	Soundtrack to the anime television series Itazura na Kiss.	
2009	"Akai Sweet Pea" "Toki no Kawa o Koete" "Desire: Jōnetsu" "Mugo N Iroppoi"	Rosario + Vampire Idol Cover Best	Image song album for the anime television series Rosario + Vampire and Rosario + Vampire Capu2.	
2009	"Hoshi no Sasayaku Monogatari"	"Keroro Japon!"	Theme song single for the anime television series Sgt. Frog.	
2009	"Present" "Endless Chain"	Magical Girl Lyrical Nanoha Strikers Sound Stage Vocal Best Collection	Image song album for the drama CD series for the anime television series Magical Girl Lyrical Nanoha Strikers; each of the tracks are featured as remixed versions.	
2009	"Heartful Song" "Yume no Tsubomi"	Shugo Chara! Character Song Collection	Image song album for the anime television series Shugo Chara!.	
2009	"Sound of Destiny" "Garasu no Hana"	"Sound of Destiny"	Image song single for the anime television series White Album.	
2009	"Ribbon no Onpu"	"Shinkyoku Sōkai Polyphonica Crimson S Character Song Vol.3"	Image song single for the anime television series Shinkyoku Sōkai Polyphonica Crimson S.	
2009	"Re:Bridge: Return to Oneself"	"Re:Bridge: Return to Oneself"	Theme song to the concert Animelo Summer Live 2009: Re:Bridge.	
2009	"Mirai Travel"	Minami-ke Character Songs Best Album	Image song album for the anime television series Minami-ke.	
2009	"Taiyō ga Niau yo"	Shugo Chara! Character Song Collection 2	Image song album for the anime television series Shugo Chara!! Doki—.	
2009	"Kimi ga Kureta Kiseki"	Magical Girl Lyrical Nanoha The Movie 1st Drama CD Side-F	Theme song for the drama CD for the anime film Magical Girl Lyrical Nanoha The Movie.	
2009	"Juliet"	The Works: Shikura Chiyomaru Gakkyō-shū 4.0	Image song compilation album of songs composed by Chiyomaru Shikura.	
2009	"Brilliant Star"	The Works: Shikura Chiyomaru Gakkyō-shū 5.0	Image song compilation album of songs composed by Chiyomaru Shikura.	
2009	"Fiat lux: Hikari Are" "Uchi e Kaerō" "Omoi no Yukue"	Tales of Symphonia The Animation Sylvarant Songs	Image song album for the OVA series Tales of Symphonia; instrumental versions of the songs are also included.	
2009	"Karakaze" "Sotto, Sotto"	"Theme of Lan Fan by The Alchemists"	Image song single for the anime television series Fullmetal Alchemist.	
2009	"Omoide no Record" "Kono Shiawase yo Eien ni" "Hakanaki Inochi no Tabidachi" "Jenis no Namida" "Eien no Utahime" "Hoshi no Uta" "Umi no Uta" "Taiyō no Uta" "Ai no Omoide"	The Eternal Diva	Theme song collection for the film Professor Layton and the Eternal Diva.	
2010	"Powder Snow" "1986-nen no Marilyn"	"Powder Snow"	Image song single for the anime television series White Album.	
2010	"Eien no Utahime"	Professor Layton and the Eternal Diva Original Soundtrack	Soundtrack to the film Professor Layton and the Eternal Diva.	
2010	"Red Orpheus: Aka no Shinwa" "Call From Eve"	White Album Sound Stage 1	Theme song for a drama CD for the anime television series White Album.	
2010	"Akeneiro no Sora"	Shugo Chara! Character Song Collection 3	Image song album for the anime television series Shugo Chara!!! Dokki Doki.	
2010	"Dangan Shōjo"	White Album Sound Stage 2	Theme song for a drama CD for the anime television series White Album.	
2010	"Shin'ai" "Mugen" "Sound of Destiny" "Powder Snow (Live. Ver)" "Powder Snow (Yuki & Rina Ver.)"	White Album Character Song Best & Soundtrack	Theme songs for the anime television series White Album.	
2010	"Koi no Yokushiryoku"	"Heaven's Divide / Koi no Yokushiryoku"	Image song single for the video game Metal Gear Solid: Peace Walker.	
2010	"Koi no Yokushiryoku"	Metal Gear Solid Peace Walker Original Soundtrack	Soundtrack to the video game Metal Gear Solid: Peace Walker.	
2010	"Tsu Bo Mi: Flower Flower"	"Tsu Bo Mi: Flower Flower / Special Colorful"	Theme song single for the anime television series HeartCatch PreCure!.	
2010	"Heaven in the Hell"	Shinakoi	Ending theme song for a drama CD for the manga series Shinakoi.	
2010	"Karakaze" "Sotto, Sotto"	Theme of Fullmetal Alchemist by The Alchemists	Image song compilation album for the anime television series Fullmetal Alchemist.	
2010	"Evolution (For Beloved One)"	"Evolution (For Beloved One)"	Theme song to the concert Animelo Summer Live 2010: Evolution.	
2010	"Tsu Bo Mi: Future Flower (Promenade remix)" "Open the World" "Kokoro no Hana"	HeartCatch PreCure! Vocal Album 1: Earth, Sea, Sun and Moon	Vocal album for the anime television series HeartCatch PreCure!.	
2010	"Egao no Yukue"	Otoko to Onna 3: Two Hearts Two Voices	A duet with Junichi Inagaki.	
2011	"Renbu Minuet"	Koisuru Otome no Rhapsody	Image song for the character Nanase Kotobuki from the "Koisuru Otome no Rhapsody" episode of the Book Girl Memoir OVA series.	
2012	"Gyakkō no Flugel" "Orbital Beat"	Senki Zesshō Symphogear Character Song #1	Image song single for the anime television series Senki Zesshō Symphogear (duet with Minami Takayama).	
2012	"Zettō (Ame no Habakiri)" "Flight Feathers"	Senki Zesshō Symphogear Character Song #3	Image song single for the anime television series Senki Zesshō Symphogear.	
2012	"First Love Song"	Senki Zesshō Symphogear BD/DVD Volume 6 CD	Image song single for the anime television series Senki Zesshō Symphogear (trio with Aoi Yūki and Ayahi Takagaki).	
2012	"Seimei no Ōka"	Shining Blade Character Song Album	Image song for the video game Shining Blade.	
2012	"Sound of Destiny"	Aquaplus Vocal Collection Vol. 8	Image song for the anime television series White Album.	
2013	"Sōkai Shooting"	Minami-ke Tadaima Character Song Album Minami-ke no Minauta	Image song for the anime television series Minami-ke: Tadaima.	
2013	"Preserved Roses"	"Preserved Roses"	Opening theme for the anime television series Valvrave the Liberator (duet with T.M.Revolution).	
2013	"Gekkō no Tsurugi" "Koi no Okehamaza"	Senki Zesshou Symphogear G Character Song 4	Image song single for the anime television series Senki Zesshō Symphogear G.	
2013	"Kakumei Dualism"	"Kakumei Dualism"	Opening theme for the anime television series Valvrave the Liberator (duet with T.M.Revolution).	
2014	"Fuyu no Owari ni"	"Fuyu no Owari ni"	Image song single for the anime film The Last: Naruto the Movie.	
2015	"Tenkuu no Aria Amakakeru Toki no Tsubasa"	"Tenkuu no Aria Amakakeru Toki no Tsubasa"	Image song single for the video game Shining Resonance.	
2015	"Seiten Galaxy Cross"	Senki Zesshō Symphogear GX Character Song #1	Image song single for the anime television series Senki Zesshō Symphogear GX (duet with Yoko Hikasa).	
2015	"Beyond the Blade" "Sora e..."	Senki Zesshō Symphogear GX Character Song #3	Image song single for the anime television series Senki Zesshō Symphogear GX.	
2015	"Radiant Force"	Senki Zesshō Symphogear GX BD/DVD Volume 1 CD	Image song single for the anime television series Senki Zesshō Symphogear GX (trio with Aoi Yūki and Ayahi Takagaki).	
2015	"Bayonet Charge"	Senki Zesshō Symphogear GX BD/DVD Volume 3 CD	Image song single for the anime television series Senki Zesshō Symphogear GX (duet with Ayahi Takagaki).	
2017	"Gekka Bijin"	Senki Zesshō Symphogear AXZ Character Song #3	Image song single for the anime television series Senki Zesshō Symphogear AXZ.	
2017	"Luminous Gate"	Senki Zesshō Symphogear AXZ Character Song #3	Image song single for the anime television series Senki Zesshō Symphogear AXZ.	

== Other video album appearances ==
Year	Song(s)	Video album	Artist(s)	Ref.
2006	"Eternal Blaze" "Innocent Starter" "Hime Murasaki" "Super Generation"	Animelo Summer Live 2006: Outride I	Various artists	
2007	"Justice to Believe" "Secret Ambition" "Heart-shaped Chant"	Animelo Summer Live 2007 Generation-A	Various artists	
2009	"Zankō no Gaia" "Dancing In the Velvet Moon" "Pray" "Eternal Blaze"	Animelo Summer Live 2008: Challenge 8.30	Various artists	
2010	"Gimmick Game" "Shin'ai" "Etsuraku Camellia" "Orchestral Fantasia"	Animelo Summer Live 2009 Re:Bridge 8.23	Various artists	
2011	"Don't be long" "Next Arcadia" "Phantom Minds" "Unchain∞World"	Animelo Summer Live 2010 Evolution 8.29	Various artists	
2012	"Eternal Blaze" "Unbreakable" "Junketsu Paradox" "Scarlet Knight"	Animelo Summer Live 2011 Rainbow 8.28	Various artists	
2014	"Ai no Hoshi" "Brave Phoenix" "Vitalization" "Synchrogazer"	Animelo Summer Live 2013 Flag Nine 8.25	Various artists	

== Notes and references ==
- ^{A} A remixed version of "Justice to Believe" was later released on Nana Mizuki's compilation album The Museum, but "Aoi Iro" was not released on an album until Great Activity.

General

- "水樹奈々 公式サイト NANAPARTY Discography" [Nana Mizuki Official Site NANAPARTY Discography] (in Japanese). King Records.

Specific
