= The Museum (album) =

Greatest hits album by Nana Mizuki
- Released: 7 February 2007
- Genre: J-pop
- Length: 76:18 (CD), 00:28 (DVD)
- Label: King Records

Nana Mizuki chronology
Hybrid Universe (2006)	The Museum (2007)	Great Activity (2007)

The Museum is the first greatest hits album by Japanese singer Nana Mizuki, released on 7 February 2007. The album peaked at number 5 in the Oricon weekly charts.

== Track listing ==
1. Omoi (想い) (1st single)
  - Lyrics: Chokkyu Murano
  - Arrangement: Nobuhiro Makino
  - Insert song for Drama CD Shōnen Shinkaron (少年進化論)
2. Heaven Knows (2nd single)
  - Lyrics: Chokkyu Murano
  - Arrangement: Nobuhiro Makino
  - Ending theme for anime television series Run=Dim
3. The Place of Happiness (3rd single)
  - Lyrics: Chokkyu Murano
  - Arrangement: Nobuhiro Makino
  - Theme song for PS2 game Generation of Chaos
4. Love & History (4th single)
  - Lyrics: Chokkyu Murano
  - Arrangement: Nobuhiro Makino
  - Theme song for PS2 game Generation of Chaos NEXT
5. Power Gate (5th single)
  - Lyrics, composition, arrangement: Toshiro Yabuki
  - Ending theme for TV Osaka's program M-Voice
6. Suddenly: Meguriaete (6th single)
  - Lyrics, composition, arrangement: Toshiro Yabuki
7. New Sensation (7th single)
  - Lyrics, composition, arrangement: Toshiro Yabuki
  - Theme song for Ozaki TV commercial
8. still in the groove (8th single)
  - Lyrics, composition, arrangement: Toshiro Yabuki
  - Theme song for TV commercial dwango's Iro melo mix
9. Panorama(パノラマ-Panorama-) (9th single)
  - Lyrics: Nana Mizuki
  - Composition: Akimitsu Honma
  - Arrangement: Akimitsu Honma, Toshiro Yabuki
  - Opening theme for PS2 game Lost Aya Sophia
10. innocent starter (10th single)
  - Lyrics: Nana Mizuki
  - Composition, arrangement: Tsutomu Ohira
  - Opening theme for anime television series Magical Girl Lyrical Nanoha
11. Wild Eyes (11th single)
  - Lyrics: Nana Mizuki
  - Composition, arrangement: Takahiro Iida
  - Ending theme for anime television series Basilisk: The Kouga Ninja Scroll
12. Eternal Blaze (12th single)
  - Lyrics: Nana Mizuki
  - Composition, arrangement: Noriyasu Agematsu (Elements Garden)
  - Opening theme for anime television series Magical Girl Lyrical Nanoha A's
13. Super Generation (13th single)
  - Lyrics: Nana Mizuki
  - Composition, arrangement: Junpei Fujita (Elements Garden)
  - Ending theme for TV Asahi program Yaguchi Hitori
14. Justice to Believe (Museum Style) (14th single)
  - Lyrics: Nana Mizuki
  - Composition, arrangement: Noriyasu Agematsu (Elements Garden)
  - The original version is the opening theme of the PS2 game Wild Arms 5
15. Crystal Letter
  - Lyrics: Hibiki
  - Composition: Matsuki Fuji
  - Arrangement: Hitoshi Fujima (Elements Garden)
  - Ending theme for PS2 game Wild Arms 5
  - New song made for this album
16. Transmigration 2007
  - Lyrics: Masami Okui
  - Composition, arrangement: Toshiro Yabuki
  - New rendition of the original "Transmigration"

== The Museum DVD ==
- Promo Video for Crystal Letter
- Studio Live for Tears' Night
- Studio Live for Ano hi yumemita negai (あの日夢見た願い)
- Studio Live for Justice to Believe
- The Museum photo shooting

== Charts ==
Chart	Peak position	Sales	Time in chart
Oricon Weekly Albums	5	66,828	15 weeks
