= Hybrid Universe =

Studio album by Nana Mizuki
- Released: (Japan) 3 May 2006
- Genre: J-pop
- Length: 66:45
- Label: King Records

Nana Mizuki chronology
Alive & Kicking (2004)	Hybrid Universe (2006)	The Museum (2007)

Hybrid Universe is the fifth album by Japanese singer and voice actress Nana Mizuki, released on 3 May 2006.

== Track listing ==
1. Zankou no Gaia (残光のガイア)
  - Lyrics: HIBIKI
  - Composition, arrangement: Hitoshi Fujima (Elements Garden)
  - Ending theme for TV Asahi program Selection X
2. Faith
  - Lyrics: Akiko Watanabe
  - Composition, arrangement: Kouji Gotou
3. WILD EYES
  - Lyrics: Nana Mizuki
  - Composition, arrangement: Takahiro Iida
4. You have a dream
  - Lyrics: Hiroko Koma
  - Composition: Yuuki Tsuruta
  - Arrangement: Junpei Fujita (Elements Garden)
5. BRAVE PHOENIX
  - Lyrics, composition, arrangement: Noriyasu Agematsu (Elements Garden)
  - Insert song for Magical Girl Lyrical Nanoha A's
6. Hoshizora to tsuki to hanabi no shita (星空と月と花火の下)
  - Lyrics: Bee
  - Composition, arrangement: Noriyasu Agematsu (Elements Garden)
7. SUPER GENERATION
  - Lyrics, composition: Nana Mizuki
  - Arrangement: Junpei Fujita
8. Naked Feels
  - Lyrics, composition, arrangement: Hayato Tanaka
9. Love Trippin'
  - Lyrics: Nana Mizuki
  - Composition, arrangement: Junpei Fujita
10. Late Summer Tale
  - Lyrics: Ryoji Sonoda
  - Composition, arrangement: Wataru Masachi
11. Violetta
  - Lyrics, composition: Nana Mizuki
  - Arrangement: Hitoshi Fujima
12. Primal Affection
  - Lyrics, composition, arrangement: Toshiro Yabuki
13. Hitotsu dake chikaeru nara (ひとつだけ誓えるなら)
  - Lyrics: Bee
  - Composition, arrangement: Noriyasu Agematsu
14. ETERNAL BLAZE
  - Lyrics: Nana Mizuki
  - Composition, arrangement: Noriyasu Agematsu
  - Opening theme for Magical Girl Lyrical Nanoha A's

== Charts ==
Chart	Peak position	Sales	Time in chart
Oricon Weekly Albums	#3	51,430	8 weeks.

== DVD ==
- Promo Video for Super Generation
- The making of Hybrid Universe
