= Nana Mizuki Live Fighter -Blue x Red Side- =

Video by Nana Mizuki
- Released: (Japan) 25 December 2008
- Genre: J-Pop
- Label: King Records

Nana Mizuki chronology
Nana Clips 4 (2008)	Nana Mizuki Live Fighter -Blue x Red Side- (2008)	Nana Mizuki Live Diamond x Fever (2010)

Nana Mizuki Live Fighter -Blue x Red Side- is the 7th live DVD and 1st Blu-ray Disc release from J-pop star and voice actress Nana Mizuki.

== Track listing ==
Both Blue Side and Red Side were performed in the summer of 2008, on July 5 and July 6 respectively.

Blue Side	Red Side
OPENING	OPENING
Astrogation	Astrogation
still in the groove	still in the groove
MC1	MC1
Happy Dive	Happy Dive
TRY AGAIN	TRY AGAIN
空時計	空時計
CHERRY BOYS SHOWCASE	CHERRY BOYS SHOWCASE
Dancing in the velvet moon	Dancing in the velvet moon
Faith	Faith
MC2	MC2
砂漠の海	White Lie
deep sea	ヒメムラサキ
COSMIC LOVE	COSMIC LOVE
You have a dream	You have a dream
MC3	MC3
迷宮バタフライ	赤いスイートピー
MC4	MC4
Level Hi!	BE READY!
STOMP	STOMP
Bring it on!	Bring it on!
Pray	TRANSMIGRATION
MC5	MC5
Orchestral Fantasia	Orchestral Fantasia
BAND BATTLE	BAND BATTLE
suddenly～巡り合えて～	Justice to Believe
アオイイロSUPER GENERATION	MASSIVE WONDERS
MC6	BRAVE PHOENIX
POWER GATE	MC6
What cheer?	ETERNAL BLAZE
MC7	What cheer?
Nostalgia	MC7
MC8	Nostalgia
New Sensation	MC8
ALL LINE UP	ミラクル☆フライト
End roll	ALL LINE UP
	End roll
