= Suddenly =

Suddenly may refer to:

== Film and television ==
- Suddenly (1954 film), an American film noir directed by Lewis Allen
- Suddenly (1996 film), an American television film directed by Robert Allan Ackerman
- Suddenly (2002 film) (Tan de repente), an Argentine-Dutch film directed by Diego Lerman
- Suddenly (2006 film), a Swedish film directed by Johan Brisinger
- Suddenly (2023 film), a French survival thriller film by Thomas Bidegain
- "Suddenly" (Grey's Anatomy), a 2012 television episode

== Music ==
=== Albums ===
- Suddenly (Arrogance album) or the title song, 1980
- Suddenly (Billy Ocean album) or the title song (see below), 1984
- Suddenly (Caribou album), 2020
- Suddenly (J-Walk album) or the title song, 2002
- Suddenly (Marcus Miller album) or the title song, 1983
- Suddenly (The Sports album) or the title song, 1980
- Suddenly (EP), by Allstar Weekend, 2010
- Suddenly, by Børns, 2023

=== Songs ===
- "Suddenly" (Angry Anderson song), 1987
- "Suddenly" (Arash song), 2008
- "Suddenly" (Ashley Tisdale song), 2008
- "Suddenly" (Billy Ocean song), 1985
- "Suddenly" (BT song), 2010
- "Suddenly" (LeAnn Rimes song), 2003
- "Suddenly" (Les Misérables song), from the 2012 film
- "Suddenly" (Olivia Newton-John and Cliff Richard song), 1980
- "Suddenly" (Sean Maguire song), 1995
- "Suddenly" (Soraya song) ("De Repente"), 1996
- "Suddenly" (Toni Braxton song), 2006
- "Suddenly: Meguriaete" / "Brilliant Star", by Nana Mizuki, 2002
- "Suddenly", by Black Rebel Motorcycle Club from Take Them On, On Your Own, 2003
- "Suddenly", by the Bee Gees from Odessa, 1969
- "Suddenly", by Creed from Full Circle, 2009
- "Suddenly", by Ryan Ferguson, 2005
- "Suddenly", by Solveig from the Help! I'm a Fish film soundtrack, 2003
- "Suddenly", by tobyMac from Portable Sounds, 2007
