= Nana Mizuki Live Formula at Saitama Super Arena =

Nana Mizuki Live Formula at the Saitama Super Arena

Video by Nana Mizuki
- Released: (Japan) 2008-05-09
- Genre: J-Pop
- Length: 96 min (disc 1), 83 min (disc 2), 105 min (disc 3)
- Label: King Records

Nana Mizuki chronology
Nana Mizuki Live Museum x Universe (2007)	Nana Mizuki Live Formula at the Saitama Super Arena (2008)	Nana Clips 4 (2008)

Nana Mizuki Live Formula at Saitama Super Arena is the sixth live DVD release from J-pop star and voice actress Nana Mizuki. It was ranked #1 in weekly Oricon chart for music DVD, and #4 for all DVD (including movies).

== Track listing ==
The first two discs contain Live Formula 2007-2008 that was held on 2008-01-03 at the Saitama Super Arena, which broke her own record for having 16,000 audience, and also marked her 50th live concert since her debut. Most of the songs performed are from her latest album Great Activity. There's a special audio commentary by Nana Mizuki herself too.

=== Disc 1 ===
1. OPENING
2. Bring it on！
3. Secret Ambition
4. MC 1
5. First Calendar (ファーストカレンダー)
6. Freestyle (フリースタイル)
7. RUSH＆DASH！
8. chronicle of sky
9. through the night
10. Pray
11. Innocent Starter
12. MC 2
13. Heart-shaped chant (Special guest harpist Mika Agematsu)
14. MC 3
15. Last Scene (ラストシーン) (acoustic)
16. Crystal Letter (acoustic)
17. Take a chance
18. Power Gate
19. Super Generation

=== Disc 2 ===
1. Massive Wonders
2. Eternal Blaze
3. Zankou no Gaia (残光のガイア)
4. Orchestral Fantasia
5. MC 4
6. Sing Forever
  - ENCORE
7. Seven
8. Justice to Believe
9. MC 5
10. Dancing in the velvet moon
11. Level Hi！
12. MC 6
13. Aoi Iro (アオイイロ) ～a cappella～
14. MC 7
15. end roll

=== Disc 3 ===
Contains footage of Live Formula 2007-2008 that took place in Christmas Eve and New Year Eve.

==== 2007.12.24 at Sendai Sunplaza Hall ====
1. Inside of mind
2. Brave Phoenix
3. Promise on Christmas

==== 2007.12.31 at Grand Cube Osaka ====
1. Aoi Iro (アオイイロ)
2. Countdown 2007-2008
3. Super Generation
4. Suddenly ~meguriaete~ (suddenly～巡り合えて～)

== Special features ==
1. Making of Live Formula
2. Nana x Cherry Boys Zadankai (座談会, lit. Symposium)
