= Magic Attraction =

Studio album by Nana Mizuki
- Released: 6 November 2002
- Genre: J-pop
- Length: 66:55
- Label: King Records

Nana Mizuki chronology
| Supersonic Girl (2001) | Magic Attraction (2002) | Dream Skipper (2003) |

Magic Attraction is the second album by Japanese singer Nana Mizuki, released on 6 November 2002. The album was released one year after her debut studio album Supersonic Girl (2001) and marked the second consecutive annual album release in what became a three-year consecutive run, followed by Dream Skipper (2003). It peaked at number 21 on the Oricon Weekly Albums chart with total certified sales of 22,051 copies over five weeks. The album includes two tracks tied to video game tie-ins: "Orugōru to Piano to: Holy Style" serves as an ending theme for the PlayStation 2 game Memories Off Duet, while "Love & History" appeared in the same franchise. Two previously released singles are included: "Suddenly: Meguriaete" and "Brilliant Star" from her sixth single, and "Power Gate" from her fifth single.

== Track listing ==
1. Theme of Magic Attraction (Instrumental)
  - Composition, arrangement: Tsutomu Ohira
2. Through the night
  - Lyrics: Toshiro Yabuki
  - Composition, arrangement: Takahiro Iida
3. Protection
  - Lyrics, composition, arrangement: Toshiro Yabuki
4. Futari no Memory (二人のMemory)
  - Lyrics, composition, arrangement: Toshiro Yabuki
5. freestyle (フリースタイル)
  - Composition: Honma Akimitsu
  - Arrangement: Honma Akimitsu, Tsutomu Ohira
6. Stand
  - Lyrics, composition, arrangement: Toshiro Yabuki, Tsutomu Ohira
7. deep sea
  - Lyrics: Kazue Tsuda
  - Composition, arrangement: Tsutomu Ohira
8. Suddenly: Meguriaete (Suddenly 〜巡り合えて〜)
  - Lyrics, composition, arrangement: Toshiro Yabuki
9. Orugōru to Piano to: Holy Style (オルゴールとピアノと -holy style-)
  - Lyrics, composition: Shikura Chiyomaru
  - Arrangement: Tsutomu Ohira
  - Ending theme for PS2 game Memories Off Duet
10. Love & History
  - Lyrics: Chokkyu Murano
  - Composition: Ataru Sumiyoshi
  - Arrangement: Nobuhiro Makino
11. Juliet
  - Lyrics, composition: Shikura Chiyomaru
  - Arrangement: Toshimichi Isoe
12. climb up
  - Lyrics, composition, arrangement: Toshiro Yabuki
13. Brilliant Star
  - Lyrics, composition: Shikura Chiyomaru
  - Arrangement: Toshimichi Isoe
14. Power Gate
  - Lyrics, composition, arrangement: Toshiro Yabuki
15. Ano hi yumemita negai (あの日夢見た願い)
  - Lyrics: Kazue Tsuda
  - Composition, arrangement: Tsutomu Ohira

== Charts ==
| Chart | Peak position | Sales | Time in chart |
|---|---|---|---|
| Oricon Weekly Albums | 21 | 22,051 | 5 weeks |
