= Alive & Kicking (Nana Mizuki album) =

Studio album by Nana Mizuki
- Released: 8 December 2004
- Genre: J-pop, Soft rock, Synthpop
- Length: 65:08
- Label: King Records

Nana Mizuki chronology
Dream Skipper (2003)	Alive & Kicking (2004)	Hybrid Universe (2006)

Alive & Kicking is the fourth album by Japanese singer Nana Mizuki, released on 8 December 2004.

== Track listing ==
1. Miracle Flight (ミラクル☆フライト)
  - Lyrics, composition, arrangement: Toshiro Yabuki
2. Innocent Starter
  - Lyrics: Nana Mizuki
  - Composition, arrangement: Tsutomu Ohira
  - Opening theme for anime television Magical Girl Lyrical Nanoha
3. Fake Angel
  - Lyrics: Nana Mizuki
  - Composition, arrangement: Takahiro Iida
4. Daisuki Kimi e (大好きな君へ)
  - Lyrics: Toshiro Yabuki
  - Composition, arrangement: Tsutomu Ohira
5. Tears' Night
  - Lyrics: Yuumao
  - Composition, arrangement: Noriyasu Agematsu
6. Soyokaze ni fukarete... (そよ風に吹かれて．．．)
  - Lyrics: Toshiro Yabuki
  - Composition, arrangement: Tsutomu Ohira
7. Independent Love Song
  - Lyrics: Nana Mizuki
  - Composition, arrangement: Tsutomu Ohira
8. Take a Shot
  - Lyrics, composition, arrangement: Toshiro Yabuki
  - Insert song for anime television Magical Girl Lyrical Nanoha
9. Panorama
  - Lyrics: Nana Mizuki
  - Composition: Akimitsu Honma
  - Arrangement: Akimitsu Honma, Tsutomu Ohira
10. Jump!
  - Lyrics: Nana Mizuki
  - Composition, arrangement: Takahiro Iida
11. Cherish
  - Lyrics, composition, arrangement: Toshiro Yabuki
12. It's in the Bag
  - Lyrics: Toshiro Yabuki
  - Composition: Kenji Kitajima
  - Arrangement: Tsutomu Ohira
13. Abilities
  - Lyrics, composition, arrangement: Toshiro Yabuki
14. M.A.M.A
  - Lyrics: Naoko
  - Composition, arrangement: Tsutomu Ohira

== Charts ==
Chart	Peak position	Sales	Time in chart
Oricon Weekly Albums	17	32,890	6 weeks
