= Dream Skipper =

Studio album by Nana Mizuki
- Released: 27 November 2003
- Genre: J-pop
- Length: 67:40
- Label: King Records

Nana Mizuki chronology
| Magic Attraction (2002) | Dream Skipper (2003) | Alive & Kicking (2004) |

Dream Skipper is the third album by Japanese singer Nana Mizuki, released on 27 November 2003.

== Track listing ==
1. Takaramono (宝物)
  - Lyrics: Naoko
  - Composition, arrangement: Tsutomu Ohira
2. Be Ready
  - Lyrics, composition, arrangement: Toshiro Yabuki
3. Keep your hands in the air
  - Lyrics: Toshiro Yabuki
  - Composition, arrangement: Takahiro Iida
4. Still In the Groove
  - Lyrics, composition, arrangement: Toshiro Yabuki
5. Sabaku no umi (砂漠の海)
  - Lyrics: Toshiro Yabuki
  - Composition, arrangement: Tsutomu Ohira
6. Dear to me
  - Lyrics, composition, arrangement: Toshiro Yabuki
7. What cheer?
  - Lyrics: Toshiro Yabuki
  - Composition, arrangement: Takahiro Iida
8. Jet Park
  - Lyrics: Nana Mizuki
  - Composition: Takahiro Iida
  - Arrangement: Takahiro Iida, Tsutomu Ohira
9. White Lie
  - Lyrics: Naoko
  - Composition, arrangement: Akimitsu Honma
10. Nocturne: revision
  - Lyrics, composition: Chiyomaru Shikura
  - Arrangement: Tsutomu Ohira
  - New recording for opening song of anime television Memories Off 2nd
11. Himawari (ひまわり)
  - Lyrics: Naoko
  - Composition: Akimitsu Honma
  - Arrangement: Akimitsu Honma, Tsutomu Ohira
12. Koishiteru... (恋してる．．．)
  - Lyrics: Nana Mizuki
  - Composition, arrangement: Tsutomu Ohira
13. In a fix
  - Lyrics, composition, arrangement: Toshiro Yabuki
14. New Sensation
  - Lyrics, composition, arrangement: Toshiro Yabuki
15. Refrain: Classico
  - Lyrics, composition: Toshiro Yabuki
  - Arrangement: Toshiro Yabuki, Tsutomu Ohira

== Charts ==
| Chart | Peak position | Sales | Time in chart |
|---|---|---|---|
| Oricon Weekly Albums | 25 | 19,518 | 4 |
