= Nana Mizuki Live Diamond x Fever =

Video by Nana Mizuki
- Released: 23 December 2009
- Genre: J-Pop
- Length: 96 min (disc 1), 103 min (disc 2), 95 min (disc 3), 98 min (disc 4), 115 min (disc 5)
- Label: King Records

Nana Mizuki chronology
Nana Mizuki Live Fighter Blue x Red Side (2008)	Nana Mizuki Live Diamond x Fever (2009)	Nana Mizuki Live Games x Academy -Red Side- (2010)

Nana Mizuki Live Diamond x Fever is the 8th live DVD and 2nd Blu-ray Disc release from J-pop star and voice actress Nana Mizuki. It has 5 discs containing her two concerts Live Fever 2009 and Live Diamond 2009.

== Live Diamond 2009 ==
Live Diamond 2009 was held on 5 July 2009 at Seibu Dome.

=== Disc 1 ===
1. OPENING
2. Miracle Flight (ミラクル☆フライト)
3. Aoi Iro (アオイイロ)
4. Ano ne ~Mamimume Mogacho~ (アノネ〜まみむめ☆もがちょ〜)
5. MC1
6. The Place of Happiness
7. Aoki Hikari no Hate -ULTIMATE MODE- (蒼き光の果て-ULTIMATE MODE-)
8. Nostalgia
9. Ongaku Sentai Cherrybo Seven no Theme (音楽戦隊チェリボセブンのテーマ(短編動画)) (acoustic)
10. Chinmoku no Kajitsu (沈黙の果実)
11. Zankou no Gaia (残光のガイア)
12. MC2
13. STAND
14. Shonen (少年)
15. Hutari no Memory ~Prologue~ (SHORT MOVIE) (二人のMemory〜prologue〜(SHORT MOVIE))
16. Hutari no Memory (二人のMemory)
17. PERFECT SMILE
18. MC3
19. Innocent Starter (acoustic ver.)
20. NAKED FEELS (acoustic ver.)
21. MC4
22. Shinai (acoustic ver.) (深愛(acoustic ver.))
23. TEAM YO-DA SHOWCASE
24. Gimmick Game
25. Still in the Groove
26. Take a Shot
27. MC5
28. BRAVE PHOENIX

=== Disc 2 ===
1. MARIA&JOKER〜prologue〜(SHORT MOVIE)
2. MARIA&JOKER
3. Justice to Believe
4. MC6
5. ETERNAL BLAZE
6. Taiko LOVERS enbu (太鼓LOVERS 演舞)
7. Etsuraku Camellia (悦楽カメリア)
8. Bring it on!
9. Trickster
10. MC7
11. Yume no Tsuzuki (夢の続き)

=== Disc 3 ===
1. POWER GATE
2. MC8
3. Brand New Tops
4. MC9
5. DISCOTHEQUE
6. EXTRA TIME
7. END ROLL

== Live Fever 2009 ==
Live Fever 2009 was held on 2009-01-25 in Nippon Budokan.

=== Disc 4 ===
1. OPENING
2. DISCOTHEQUE
3. chronicle of sky
4. PRIDE OF GLORY
5. MC1
6. JET PARK
7. POWER GATE
8. Take a Chance
9. CHERRYBOYS SHOWCASE
10. ETERNAL BLAZE
11. MC2
12. Trinity Cross
13. innocent Starter
14. MC3
15. Shinai (深愛)
16. TEAM YO-DA SHOWCASE
17. Trickster
18. SECRET AMBITION
19. MC4 It's in the bag
20. Last Scene (ラストシーン)
21. Love you forever (SHORT MOVIE)
22. Crystal Letter
23. Tears' Night
24. Orchestral Fantasia
25. Zankou no Gaia (残光のガイア)
26. MC5
27. Astrogation

=== Disc 5 ===
1. MASSIVE WONDERS
2. BE READY!
3. MC6
4. WILD EYES
5. MC7
6. SUPER GENERATION
7. EXTRA TIME
8. END ROLL

== Special features ==
1. Live Diamond Making Movie
2. Live Fever Making Movie
