= Sister Princess: Nijūnin no Tenshitachi =

2001 Japan compilation music album

Compilation album by Natsuko Kuwatani Hisayo Mochizuki Yumiko Kobayashi Yui Horie Chiemi Chiba Ryōka Yuzuki Ayako Kawasumi Yumi Kakazu Chiro Kanzaki Tomoe Hanba Hyo-sei Nana Mizuki
- Released: February 7, 2001
- Genre: J-pop
- Length: 67:45
- Label: King Records

Sister Princess: Nijūnin no Tenshitachi (Japanese: シスター・プリンセス 〜12人の天使たち〜, Hepburn: Shisutā Purinsesu ~Nijūnin no Tenshitachi~) is a compilation of songs of characters from Sister Princess, a light novel that was published in Dengeki G's Magazine. This album differs from the game and anime versions as a standalone image album.

== Track listing ==
No.	Title	Lyrics	Sister	Length
1.	"Deijī Būke (デイジーブーケ)"	Yōko Netsu (根津洋子)	Karen (可憐): sung by Natsuko Kuwatani	4:41
2.	"Chīsana Panjī (小さなパンジー)"	Satomi Arimori (有森聡美)	Kaho (花穂): sung by Hisayo Mochizuki	4:34
3.	"SPEED"	Satomi Arimori (有森聡美)	Mamoru (衛): sung by Yumiko Kobayashi	4:31
4.	"girlish"	Karen Shiina (椎名可憐)	Sakuya (咲耶): sung by Yui Horie	4:52
5.	"Tenshi no Shiawase (天使のシアワセ)"	Sakurako Kimino (公野櫻子)	Hinako (雛子): sung by Chiemi Chiba	4:01
6.	"Inori (いのり)"	Sakurako Kimino (公野櫻子)	Marie (鞠絵): sung by Ryouka Yuzuki	4:58
7.	"Yami no Kuchizuke (闇のくちづけ)"	Sakurako Kimino (公野櫻子)	Chikage (千影): sung by Ayako Kawasumi	5:56
8.	"Asaki Yume Mishi (あさきゆめみし)"	Yōko Netsu (根津洋子)	Haruka (春歌): sung by Yumi Kakazu	5:11
9.	"Love no Himitsu (ラブの秘密)"	Sakurako Kimino (公野櫻子)	Rinrin (鈴凛): sung by Chiro Kanzaki	4:03
10.	"Heart o Cheki! (ハートをチェキ!)"	Satomi Arimori (有森聡美)	Yotsuba (四葉): sung by Tomoe Hanba	3:50
11.	"Sweet sour cherry pie"	Karen Shiina (椎名可憐)	Shirayuki (白雪): sung by Hyo-sei	4:25
12.	"Ōji-sama to Amai Hoshi (王子様とあまいほし)"	Sakurako Kimino (公野櫻子)	Aria (亞里亞): sung by Nana Mizuki	2:53
13.	"Karen kara no Tegami" (可憐からのお手紙 (Note: The original titles for these bonus tracks have QR Radio "Letters from the Sisters from Sister Princess ~ Dear Big Brother ♥ ~" (QRラジオ 『シスター・プリンセス 妹からの手紙 ~拝啓お兄ちゃんへ♥~』 より::) prefixed to them.))			1:06
14.	"Kaho kara no Tegami" (花穂からのお手紙)			1:08
15.	"Mamoru kara no Tegami" (衛からのお手紙)			1:09
16.	"Sakuya kara no Tegami" (咲耶からのお手紙)			1:06
17.	"Hinako kara no Tegami" (雛子からのお手紙)			1:05
18.	"Marie kara no Tegami" (鞠絵からのお手紙)			1:06
19.	"Chikage kara no Tegami" (千影からのお手紙)			1:05
20.	"Haruka kara no Tegami" (春歌からのお手紙)			1:06
21.	"Rinrin kara no Tegami" (鈴凛からのお手紙)			1:08
22.	"Yotsuba kara no Tegami" (四葉からのお手紙)			1:08
23.	"Shirayuki kara no Tegami" (白雪からのお手紙)			1:09
24.	"Aria kara no Tegami" (亞里亞からのお手紙)			1:12
