= Still in the Groove =

"Still in the groove"

Single by Nana Mizuki
- Released: July 16, 2003
- Length: 26:33
- Label: King Records
- Songwriter: Toshiro Yabuki

Nana Mizuki singles chronology
"New Sensation" (2003)	"Still in the groove" (2003)	"Panorama" (2004)

Music video
- "Still in the Groove" on YouTube

"Still in the groove" is the eighth single by Japanese singer and voice actress Nana Mizuki.

== Track listing ==
1. Still in the Groove
  - Lyrics, composition, arrangement: Toshiro Yabuki
  - Theme song for dwango's Iro Melo Mix
2. refrain
  - Lyrics, composition: Toshiro Yabuki
  - Arrangement: Toshiro Yabuki, Tsutomu Ohira
  - A new version refrain -clasico- is featured in her album Dream Skipper
3. Koishiteru... (恋してる．．．)
  - Lyrics: Nana Mizuki
  - Composition, arrangement: Tsutomu Ohira
4. Still In the Groove (Vocalless ver.)
5. refrain (Vocalless ver.)
6. Koishiteru... (恋してる．．．) (Vocalless ver.)

== Charts ==
Chart	Peak position	Sales	Time in chart
Oricon Weekly Singles	17	9,744	5
