= Innocent Starter =

Single by Nana Mizuki
- Released: October 6, 2004
- Genre: J-Pop
- Length: 27:40
- Label: King Records
- Songwriters: Nana Mizuki, Tsutomu Ohira

Nana Mizuki singles chronology
"Panorama" (2004)	"Innocent Starter" (2004)	"Wild Eyes" (2005)

Music video
- "Innocent Starter" on YouTube

"Innocent Starter" is the tenth single by Japanese singer Nana Mizuki. The title track was the opening theme for the anime Magical Girl Lyrical Nanoha. It reached number 9 on the Japanese Oricon charts.

== Track listing ==
1. Innocent Starter
  - Lyrics: Nana Mizuki
  - Composition, arrangement: Tsutomu Ohira
  - Opening theme for anime television series Magical Girl Lyrical Nanoha
  - Featured in Nana Mizuki's album Alive & Kicking and her greatest hits The Museum
2. Open Your Heart
  - Lyrics: Nana Mizuki
  - Composition, arrangement: Takahiro Iida
3. Soredemo kimi o omoidesu kara -again- (それでも君を想い出すから -again-)
  - Lyrics, composition: Chiyomaru Shikura
  - Arrangement: Tsutomu Ohira
  - New version of opening theme for PS2 game Memories Off: Sorekara
4. Innocent Starter (Off Vocal Version)
5. Open Your Heart (Off Vocal Version)
6. Soredemo kimi o omoidesu kara -again- (Off Vocal Version)

== Charts ==
Chart	Peak position	Sales	Time in chart
Oricon Weekly Singles	9	25,307	8 weeks
