= New Sensation (Nana Mizuki song) =

Single by Nana Mizuki
- Released: (Japan) April 23, 2003
- Length: 26:56
- Label: King Records
- Songwriter: Toshiro Yabuki

Nana Mizuki singles chronology
"Suddenly ~Meguriaete~/Brilliant Star" (2002)	"New Sensation" (2003)	"Still In the Groove" (2003)

Music video
- "New Sensation" on YouTube

"New Sensation" is the seventh single by Japanese singer and voice actress Nana Mizuki.

== Track listing ==
1. New Sensation
  - Lyrics, composition, arrangement: Toshiro Yabuki
2. Replay Machine -custom- (リプレイマシン -custom-)
  - Lyric, composition: Chiyomaru Shikura
  - Arrangement: Tsutomu Ohira, Toshimichi Isoe
  - Opening theme for PS2 game You That Become A Memory ~Memories Off~
3. HONEY FLOWER
  - Composition: Akimitsu Honma
  - Arrangement: Akimitsu Honma, Tsutomu Ohira
4. New Sensation (Off Vocal ver.)
5. Replay Machine -custom- (リプレイマシン -custom-) (Off Vocal ver.)
6. HONEY FLOWER (Off Vocal ver.)

== Charts ==
Chart	Peak position	Sales	Time in chart
Oricon Weekly Singles	20	8,485	6
