= Wild Eyes (Nana Mizuki song) =

Single by Nana Mizuki
- Released: May 18, 2005
- Genre: Pop rock
- Length: 17:41
- Label: King Records
- Songwriters: Nana Mizuki, Junpei Fujita, Iidata Kahiro

Nana Mizuki singles chronology
"Innocent Starter" (2004)	"Wild Eyes" (2005)	"Eternal Blaze" (2005)

Music video
- "Wild Eyes" on YouTube

"Wild Eyes" is the 11th single by Japanese voice actress and singer Nana Mizuki, released on May 18, 2005.

The single reached number 13 on the Japanese Oricon charts.

== Track listing ==
1. WILD EYES
  - Lyrics: Nana Mizuki
  - Composition, arrangement: Junpei Fujita (Elements Garden)
  - Ending theme for anime television series Basilisk
2. Hime Murasaki (ヒメムラサキ)
  - Lyrics: Nana Mizuki
  - Composition, arrangement: Junpei Fujita (Elements Garden)
  - Ending theme for anime television series Basilisk
3. 76th Star
  - Lyrics: Nokko and Sawa Chihiro
  - Composition: Akio Dobashi
  - Arrangement: Kōta Igarashi
  - Opening theme for Drama CD Itazura na Kiss
4. Suki! (好き!)
  - Lyrics: Nana Mizuki
  - Composition, arrangement: Kōta Igarashi
  - Ending theme for Drama CD Itazura na Kiss

== Charts ==
Chart	Peak position	Sales	Time in chart
Oricon Weekly Singles	13	14,510	5 weeks
