= Supersonic Girl =

Studio album by Nana Mizuki
- Released: 5 December 2001
- Genre: J-pop
- Length: 52:02
- Label: King Records

Nana Mizuki chronology
| Supersonic Girl (2001) | Magic Attraction (2002) |

Supersonic Girl is the debut album of J-Pop singer, Nana Mizuki. It was released on 5 December 2001.

== Track listing ==
1. Love's Wonderland
  - Lyrics: Chokkyu Murano
  - Composition: Ataru Sumiyoshi
  - Arrangement: Nobuhiro Makino
2. The Place of Happiness
  - Lyrics: Chokkyu Murano
  - Composition: Ataru Sumiyoshi
  - Arrangement: Nobuhiro Makino
  - Opening theme for the PS2 game Generation of Chaos.
3. Supersonic Girl
  - Lyrics: Chokkyu Murano
  - Composition: Ataru Sumiyoshi
  - Arrangement: Nobuhiro Makino
4. Heaven Knows -Brave edit-
  - Lyrics: Chokkyu Murano
  - Composition: Ataru Sumiyoshi
  - Arrangement: Nobuhiro Makino
  - Ending theme for anime television series RUN=DIM
5. Omoi -pedigreed mix- (想い -pedigreed mix-)
  - Lyrics: Chokkyu Murano
  - Composition: Ataru Sumiyoshi
  - Arrangement: Nobuhiro Makino
6. Look Away-All Together Version-
  - Lyrics: Chokkyu Murano
  - Composition: JUNKO
  - Arrangement: Nobuhiro Makino
7. TRANSMIGRATION
  - Lyrics: Masami Okui
  - Composition and arrangement: Toshiro Yabuki
  - Masami Okui did a self-cover of this song in her single compilation S-mode#3
8. LOOKING ON THE MOON
  - Lyrics: Chokkyu Murano
  - Composition and arrangement: Nobuhiro Makino
9. Mafuyu no Kanransha (真冬の観覧車)
  - Composition and arrangement: Nobuhiro Makino
10. NANA iro no youni-Special album version- (NANA色のように-Special album version-)
  - Lyrics: Misaki Asou
  - Composition: Eisaku Nambu
  - Arrangement: Nobuhiro Makino
  - Ending theme for TV show Wagamanma Kichin (ワガまんまキッチン)
11. Suichu no aozora (水中の青空)
  - Lyrics: Chokkyu Murano
  - Composition: Ataru Sumiyoshi
  - Arrangement: Nobuhiro Makino
12. WINDOW OF HEART
  - Lyrics: Chokkyu Murano
  - Composition and arrangement: Nobuhiro Makino

== Charts ==
| Chart | Peak position | Sales | Time in chart |
|---|---|---|---|
| Oricon Weekly Albums | #60 | 5,090 | 1 week |
