= Suddenly: Meguriaete / Brilliant Star =

"Suddenly: Meguriaete/Brilliant Star"

Single by Nana Mizuki
- Released: September 25, 2002
- Length: 19:18
- Label: King Records
- Songwriter: Toshiro Yabuki

Nana Mizuki singles chronology
"Power Gate" (2002)	"Suddenly: Meguriaete/Brilliant Star" (2002)	"New Sensation" (2003)

Music video
- "Brilliant Star" on YouTube

"Suddenly: Meguriaete/Brilliant Star" is the sixth single by Japanese singer and voice actress Nana Mizuki. It reached number 20 on the Japanese Oricon singles chart.

== Track listing ==
1. Suddenly: Meguriaete (Suddenly 〜巡り合えて〜)
  - Lyrics, composition, arrangement: Toshiro Yabuki
2. Brilliant Star
  - Lyrics, composition: Chiyomaru Shikura
  - Arrangement: Toshimichi Isoe
3. Suddenly: Meguriaete (Suddenly 〜巡り合えて〜)(Off Vocal ver.)
4. Brilliant Star (Off Vocal ver.)
