= Panorama (Nana Mizuki song) =

Single by Nana Mizuki
- Released: 7 April 2004
- Genre: J-pop
- Length: 25:53
- Label: King Records
- Songwriters: Nana Mizuki, Akimitsu Honma

Nana Mizuki singles chronology
"still in the groove" (2003)	"Panorama" (2004)	"innocent starter" (2004)

"Panorama" is the ninth single from Japanese voice actress and singer Nana Mizuki.

The single was ranked No. 14 on the Japanese Oricon charts. This song was first released in 2004. It is the title track and the first single for which Mizuki Nana wrote the lyrics. The music was composed by Homma Akihiko, who also worked on Porno Graffitti 's hit songs. Mishima Akio, who produces Mizuki's songs, said about this song, "I participated in the anime and other productions as a cast member, and I felt that the words and worldview of this song were very persuasive as a lyricist."

== Track listing ==
1. Panorama (パノラマ -Panorama-)
  - Lyrics: Nana Mizuki
  - Composition: Akimitsu Honma
  - Arrangement: Akimitsu Honma, Tsutomu Ohira
2. cherish
  - Lyrics, composition, arrangement: Toshiro Yabuki
3. Heartbeat
  - Lyrics: Nana Mizuki
  - Composition: Takahiro Iida
  - Arrangement: Takahiro Iida, Tsutomu Ohira
4. Panorama (Off Vocal Version)
5. cherish (Off Vocal Version)
6. Heartbeat (Off Vocal Version)

== Charts ==
Chart	Peak position	Sales	Time in chart
Oricon Weekly Singles	#14	10,115	N/A
