= Love & History =

"LOVE & HISTORY"

Single by Nana Mizuki
- Released: (Japan) May 1, 2002
- Length: 19:02
- Label: King Records
- Songwriters: Chokkyu Murano, Ataru Sumiyoshi

Nana Mizuki singles chronology
"The Place of Happiness" (2001)	"LOVE & HISTORY" (2002)	"Power Gate" (2002)

"Love & History" is the fourth single by Japanese singer and voice actress Nana Mizuki. It was released together with her fifth single "Power Gate."

== Track listing ==
1. LOVE&HISTORY
  - Lyrics: Chokkyu Murano
  - Composition: Ataru Sumiyoshi
  - Arrangement: Nobuhiro Makino
  - Theme song for PS2 game Generation of Chaos
2. Summer Sweet
  - Lyrics: Chokkyu Murano
  - Composition: Takeshi
  - Arrangement: Nobuhiro Makino
3. LOVE&HISTORY (Vocalless Ver.)
4. Summer Sweet (Vocalless Ver.)
