= Super Generation =

Single by Nana Mizuki
- Released: 18 January 2006
- Genre: J-pop
- Length: 15:29
- Label: King Records
- Songwriter: Nana Mizuki

Nana Mizuki singles chronology
"Eternal Blaze" (2005)	"Super Generation" (2006)	"Justice to Believe/Aoi Iro" (2006)

Music video
- "Super Generation" on YouTube

"Super Generation" (stylized in all caps) is the 13th single by the Japanese voice actress and singer Nana Mizuki, released on 18 January 2006. The single reached number 6 on the Japanese Oricon charts. "Super Generation" is Mizuki's first self-composed song.

== Track listing ==
1. Super Generation
  - Lyrics, composition: Nana Mizuki
  - Arrangement: Junpei Fujita (Elements Garden)
  - Ending theme for TV Asahi program Yaguchi Hitori (やぐちひとり)
2. Brave Phoenix
  - Lyrics, composition, arrangement: Noriyasu Agematsu (Elements Garden)
  - Insert song for anime television series Magical Girl Lyrical Nanoha A's
3. Hikari (光)
  - Lyrics, composition: Yamato Ito
  - Arrangement: Nittoku Inoue
  - Opening theme for PS2 game Anya ni Sasayaku – Tantei Sagara Kyoichiro (闇夜にささやく～探偵 相楽恭一郎～)

== Charts ==
Chart	Peak position	Sales	Time in chart
Oricon Weekly Singles	6	27,954	3
