= Omoi =

Single by Nana Mizuki
- Released: December 6, 2000
- Length: 20:31
- Label: King Records
- Songwriter(s): Chokkyu Murano, Ataru Sumiyoshi

Nana Mizuki singles chronology
"Omoi" (2000)	"Heaven Knows" (2001)

"Omoi" is the first single of Japanese singer and voice actress Nana Mizuki. It was released on December 6, 2000, by King Records. It is her first single under the name Nana Mizuki.

== Track listing ==
1. Omoi (想い, lit. Desire)
  - Lyrics: Chokkyu Murano
  - Composition: Ataru Sumiyoshi
  - Arrangement: NOV
  - Image song for drama CD Shōnen Shin Karon
  - A new version Omoi -pedigreed mix- is featured in her album Supersonic Girl
2. ano ne -mamimume mogacho- (アノネ〜まみむめ☆もがちょ〜)
  - Lyrics: Chokkyu Murano
  - Composition: Ataru Sumiyoshi
  - Arrangement: NOV
  - Opening theme for anime television series Mamimume☆Mogacho
3. Pierce (ピアス)
  - Lyrics: Chokkyu Murano
  - Composition, arrangement: NOV
4. Omoi (想い) (vocalless ver.)
5. ano ne -mamimume mogacho- (アノネ〜まみむめ☆もがちょ〜) (vocalless ver.)
