= Eternal Blaze =

Single by Nana Mizuki
- B-side: "Rush & Dash!", "Inside Mind"
- Released: October 19, 2005
- Genre: J-pop, anime song
- Length: 12:45
- Label: King Records
- Songwriters: Nana Mizuki, Noriyasu Agematsu

Nana Mizuki singles chronology
"Wild Eyes" (2005)	"Eternal Blaze" (2005)	"Super Generation" (2006)

"Eternal Blaze" (stylized in all caps) is the 12th single by Japanese singer Nana Mizuki, released on October 19, 2005 by King Records. It was composed by Noriyasu Agematsu and written by Nana Mizuki. It is considered Mizuki's breakthrough hit single. The song spent two weeks in the top twenty of the Japanese Oricon charts, peaking at number 2.

"Eternal Blaze" was used as opening theme for the anime series Magical Girl Lyrical Nanoha A's, and it was the first single by a voice actress to reach number 2 on the weekly chart.

== Track listing ==
1. Eternal Blaze
  - Lyrics: Nana Mizuki
  - Composition, arrangement: Noriyasu Agematsu (Elements Garden)
  - Opening theme for anime television Magical Girl Lyrical Nanoha A's
2. Rush & Dash!
  - Lyrics: Bee
  - Composition, arrangement: Hitoshi Fujima (Elements Garden)
3. Inside of mind
  - Lyrics: Ryōji Sonoda
  - Composition, arrangement: Wataru Masachi

== Charts ==
Chart	Peak position	Time in chart
Oricon Weekly Singles	2	15 weeks
