= Toshiro Yabuki =

Japanese musician

Toshirō Yabuki (矢吹 俊郎, Yabuki Toshirō) is a Japanese music composer, record producer, keyboardist and guitarist. Yabuki was J-Pop singer Masami Okui's executive producer from 1995 to 2001. In 2008 he became J-Pop singer and voice actress Nana Mizuki's executive producer. Yabuki's arrangement of "What's Up Guys?", the opening theme to the 1995‍–‍1996 television series Sorcerer Hunters, won an Arrangement Award at the 2019 Heisei Anisong Grand Prix.
