= Nana Mizuki =

Japanese voice actress (born 1980)

- 水樹 奈々
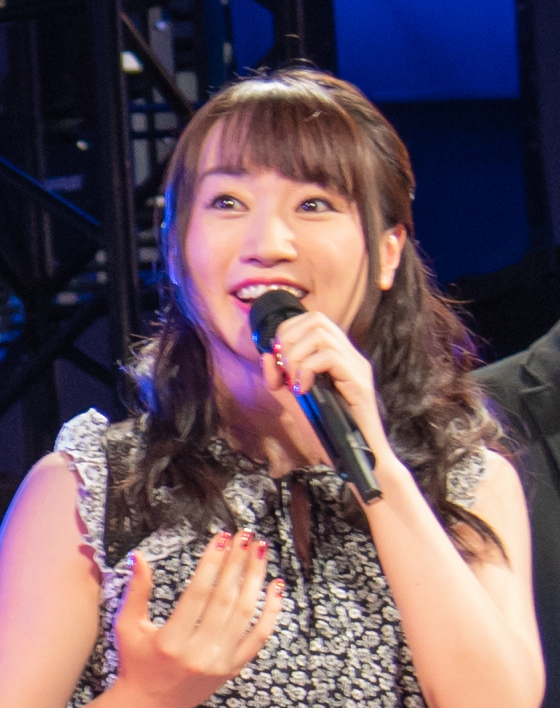
- Mizuki in 2018 Tokyo Game Show
- Born: January 21, 1980 (age 46); Niihama, Japan
- Education: Horikoshi High School
- Occupations: Voice actress; singer; narrator
- Years active: 1997–present
- Agent: StarCrew
- Children: 1
- Musical career
- Genres: J-pop; rock; dance-pop; anime song; VGM
- Instrument: Vocals
- Years active: 2000–present
- Label: King
- Website: mizukinana.jp

Nana Kondō (近藤 奈々, Kondō Nana; born January 21, 1980), better known by the stage name Nana Mizuki (水樹 奈々, Mizuki Nana), is a Japanese voice actress, singer, and narrator. She is represented by the agency StarCrew. Mizuki was trained as an enka singer, releasing one single under her birth name in 1993 and made her debut as a voice actress in 1997. Her prominent roles include Hinata Hyuga in the long-running ninja series Naruto as well in Boruto: Naruto Next Generations, Tamao Tamamura in Shaman King 2001 and 2021, Colette Brunel in Tales of Symphonia, Fate Testarossa in Magical Girl Lyrical Nanoha, Tsubasa Kazanari in Symphogear, Moka Akashiya in Rosario + Vampire, Tsubomi Hanasaki (Cure Blossom) in Heartcatch Precure! and Ann Takamaki in Persona 5. She also had official dubbing roles in live action version of Itazura na Kiss from Korea and Taiwan, as well in Hunger Games film series as Katniss Everdeen (played by Jennifer Lawrence). She is also known for dubbing Ariel Lin's roles.

Mizuki released her first single, "Omoi", under the King Records label in 2000. One year later, she released her debut album, Supersonic Girl, in 2001. In the years that followed, Mizuki enjoyed modest success that concluded with the release of her single "Innocent Starter", which reached the top 10 Oricon singles chart, charting at No. 9. Since then, Mizuki's releases have charted steadily higher in Japan, establishing her as a successful singer in the country. In 2009, her album Ultimate Diamond reached #1, her first release to do so; while her single "Phantom Minds", released in 2010, also charted at #1. Mizuki is the first voice actress to top the weekly Oricon albums chart and the weekly Oricon singles chart since its inception in 1968.

== Early life ==
Born in Niihama, Ehime, she began to train singing enka when she was five years old. In 1993, she released a Compact Cassette single "Tsugazakura" (つがざくら; lit. 'Phyllodoce Nipponica') as Nana Kondō. However, she passed the audition of game Noël: La Neige and became a voice actress in 1997.

== Career ==
Mizuki released an image song single titled "Girl's Age" under the name Chisato Kadokura in 1997. When she performed her first concert at the age of 20, she was scouted by the Japanese record label King Records, after the music producer of King called Akio Mishima went to her concert. Her debut single as Nana Mizuki, "Omoi", was released on December 6, 2000. Her 2004 song "Innocent Starter" became her first Top 10 single and her 2005 single "Eternal Blaze" reached No. 2 position on Japanese Oricon weekly single charts.

Mizuki won the "Best Musical Performance" award for her song "Justice to Believe" in the first Seiyu Awards in 2007. Since her seventh album Ultimate Diamond debuted at the No. 1 position on Oricon weekly album charts during the week of June 15, 2009, she became the first voice actress to reach the No. 1 position on the Oricon weekly album charts since its creation in 1968. Ultimate Diamond sold over 74,000 copies in the first week. In addition, her 21st single, "Phantom Minds", became the first voice actress single to top the charts, debuting at the No. 1 position on the issue of Oricon weekly single charts dated January 25, 2010.

On November 23, 2009, NHK announced that Mizuki would take part in the 60th NHK Kōhaku Uta Gassen of New Year's Eve. It was Mizuki's first time appearing on the show. Nana chose her song "Shin'ai" for her performance.

She is well known for voicing female characters who are very shy yet kind-hearted and gentle, and many of the characters she has voiced were initially very shy/soft-spoken (however, after interactions with other people, they gradually opened up (e.g. Fate Testarossa from Magical Girl Lyrical Nanoha, Nyamo from Love Hina, Hinata Hyūga from Naruto, Wrath from Fullmetal Alchemist (2003) and Tsubomi Hanasaki from Heartcatch Precure!). She is also well known for voicing females with romantic affection for protagonists, as six of her characters have romantic feelings for the main characters (Oboro from Basilisk, Hinata Hyūga from Naruto, Colette Brunel from Tales of Symphonia, Tamao Tamamura from Shaman King, Moka Akashiya from Rosario + Vampire and Fate Testarossa from Magical Girl Lyrical Nanoha), some of her characters craved maternal attention (e.g. Fate Testarossa from Magical Girl Lyrical Nanoha and its sequels A's and StrikerS, Wrath and Maria) and she was also part of the voice actress quartet "Prits", alongside Yumiko Kobayashi, Natsuko Kuwatani and Hisayo Mochizuki (all four voiced characters in the anime Sister Princess). Nana Mizuki voices Microsoft's Japanese Windows 7 unofficial "OS-tan" mascot, Nanami Madobe. The mascot's name uses some wordplay on Mizuki's own name as well as the operating system ("Nana" = "seven").

In the middle of February 2010, Mizuki was named her hometown (Niihama, Ehime)'s First Tourism Ambassador. The news was broadcast during her Live Academy 2010 tour, held in Kanagawa, Osaka, Aichi, Miyagi, Fukuoka, Ehime Prefecture Niihama Cultural Center's Hall. There were 7 lessons in total. In 2010, Mizuki won the Tomiyama Kei Award in the 4th Seiyu Awards for her news hook in the year 2009. In 2010, she also participated in 61st NHK Kōhaku Uta Gassen singing "Phantom Minds", the single which had topped Oricon Charts.

On January 21, 2011, she released her first autobiography, titled Shin Ai, to commemorate the 10th anniversary of her singing career. Mizuki won Top Pop Artists award in Billboard Japan Music Awards 2010 on February 6, 2011, together with 4 other artists: AKB48, Nishino Kana, SID and Exile.

Mizuki has participated in the 60th (2009), 61st (2010), 62nd (2011), 63rd (2012), 64th (2013) and the 65th (2014) edition of the Kōhaku Uta Gassen produced by Japanese public broadcaster NHK. On December 3–4, 2011 she had a two-day concert at Tokyo Dome. She became the first voice actress and 8th Japanese female solo artist to hold a concert at Japan's largest concert hall. On March 3, 2012, Mizuki won Animation Artist of the Year 2011 award in Billboard Japan Music Awards 2011.

On November 10, 2013, Mizuki performed Preserved Roses, Kakumei Dualism and Heart of Sword -Yoakemae- in her first overseas performance as a guest performer for T.M.Revolution at Anime Festival Asia, Singapore, Valvrave night. On November 23–24, 2013, Mizuki held her first solo concert outside Japan, in Taiwan.

In March 2014, at the 64th Annual MEXT Art Encouragement Prizes Nana Mizuki was recognized as Rookie of the Year in the Popular Entertainment division.

She held her second overseas solo concert in Singapore (September 27, 2014) and Taiwan (October 4–5, 2014) entitled "Nana Mizuki Live Flight 2014+".

On September 22, 2016, she held a concert at Koshien Stadium, Japan's oldest stadium, becoming the first voice actress and the first solo artist to hold a concert at the venue.

In July 2017, Mizuki made her debut as a stage actress in a Japanese production of Beautiful: The Carole King Musical in the title role of Carole King.

On September 30, 2017, she performed in the opening ceremony of 72nd National Sports Festival of Japan, held at Ningineer Stadium in Ehime, in front of Emperor Akihito, Empress Michiko and approximately 20,000 attendees.

In January 2018, Mizuki held a 7-day long concert series at the Nippon Budokan.

She held her third overseas solo concert in Taiwan (September 29, 2018) and China (October 13, 2018) entitled "Nana Mizuki Live Island 2018+".

Starting in July 2022, she embarked on her first live tour in three years after the COVID-19 pandemic, achieving her goal of visiting all 47 prefectures at her performance in Hitachi City, Ibaraki Prefecture on July 30.

On October 9, 2022, she sang the national anthem in the final race at the 2022 Japanese Grand Prix of Formula One held at Suzuka Circuit.

She held her fourth overseas solo concert in Hong Kong (February 15, 2026), South Korea (March 21–22, 2026) and Taiwan (April 11–12, 2026) entitled "Nana Mizuki Live Vision 2025–2026+".

== Personal life ==
Mizuki announced her marriage to a person in the music industry on July 7, 2020, on her blog. On November 6, 2020, she announced on her blog that she was pregnant with her first child. On March 16, 2021, Mizuki announced on her blog that she'd successfully given birth to her first child. On April 23, 2022, she tested positive for COVID-19 but later recovered and returned to work.

== Discography ==
- Supersonic Girl (2001)
- Magic Attraction (2002)
- Dream Skipper (2003)
- Alive & Kicking (2004)
- Hybrid Universe (2006)
- Great Activity (2007)
- Ultimate Diamond (2009)
- Impact Exciter (2010)
- Rockbound Neighbors (2012)
- Supernal Liberty (2014)
- Smashing Anthems (2015)
- Neogene Creation (2016)
- Cannonball Running (2019)
- Delighted Reviver (2022)
- Contemporary Emotion (2025)

== Filmography ==
=== Anime ===
List of voice performances in anime
Year	Title	Role	Notes	Sources
1998	Flint the Time Detective	Yamato Sora		
1999	Shin Hakkenden	Saya		
2000	Love Hina	Nyamo Namo		
2001–21	Shaman King	Tamao Tamamura		
2001	Sister Princess	Aria		
2002	HAPPY★LESSON THE TV	Minazuki Rokumatsuri		
2002–07	Naruto	Hinata Hyūga		
2002	Samurai Deeper Kyo	Mika		
2002	Seven of Seven	Nana Suzuki		
2002	Tenchi Muyo! GXP	Neju Na Melmas		
2002	Princess Tutu	Rue / Princess Kraehe		
2002	Sister Princess: Re Pure	Aria		
2002	Gravion	Marinia		
2003	Ninja Scroll: The Series	Yayoi		
2003	HAPPY★LESSON ADVANCE	Minazuki Rokumatsuri		
2003	Bottle Fairy	Kururu		
2003	F-Zero Falcon Legend	Lucy Liberty		
2004	Fullmetal Alchemist	Wrath		
2004	Ragnarok the Animation	Yufa		
2004	Gravion Zwei	Marinia		
2004	Kaiketsu Zorori	Maruchiinu		
2004	Paranoia Agent	Taeko Hirukawa		
2004	Ninja Nonsense	Shinobu		
2004	Magical Girl Lyrical Nanoha	Fate Testarossa		
2004	Tactics	Suzu Edogawa		
2004	Yakitate!! Japan	Sophie Balzac Kirisaki		
2005	Ichigo 100%	Yui Minamito		
2005	Koi Koi Seven	Yayoi Asuka		
2005	Elemental Gelade	Cisqua		
2005	Magical Canan	Sayaka Mizushiro		
2005	Majime ni Fumajime: Kaiketsu Zorori	Maruchiinu		
2005	Basilisk	Oboro		
2005	Guyver: The Bioboosted Armor	Mizuki Segawa		
2005	Magical Girl Lyrical Nanoha A's	Fate Testarossa, Alicia Testarossa		
2005	Ah My Buddha	Ayako		
2005	Canvas 2: Niji Iro no Sketch	Ruriko Misono		
2005	Hell Girl	Tsugumi Shibata		
2006	Kagihime Monogatari Eikyū Alice Rondo	Akane Akatsuki	episode 4	
2006	Yoshinaga-san Chi no Gargoyle	Lili Hamilton		
2006	Kiba	Roya		
2006	Simoun	Morinas		
2006	Fushigiboshi no Futagohime Gyu!	Whoopi	episode 4	
2006	Inukami!	Kei Shindou		
2006	Witchblade	Maria		
2006	Jyu Oh Sei	Tiz		
2006	Tsuyokiss Cool×Sweet	Sunao Konoe		
2006	Hell Girl: Two Mirrors	Tsugumi Shibata	season two	
2007–17	Naruto: Shippuden	Hinata Hyūga		
2007	Magical Girl Lyrical Nanoha Strikers	Fate T. Harlaown		
2007	Shinkyoku Sōkai Polyphonica	Yugiri Perserte		
2007	Engage Planet Kiss Dum	Yuno Rukina		
2007	Claymore	Riful		
2007	Darker than Black	Misaki Kirihara		
2007	Shining Tears X Wind	Kanon Seena		
2007	Mokke	Mizuki Hibara		
2007	Dragonaut - The Resonance	Sieglinde Baumgard		
2007	Shugo Chara!	Utau Hoshina		
2007	MapleStory	Krone		
2007	Minami-ke	Tōma Minami		
2007	Ayakashi	Eimu Yoake		
2008	Hakushaku to Yōsei	Lydia Carlton		
2008	Hell Girl: Three Vessels	Tsugumi Shibata	season three	
2008	Rosario + Vampire	Moka Akashiya		
2008	Minami-ke: Okawari	Tōma Minami		
2008	Allison & Lillia	Allison Whittington, Lillia Whittington-Schultz		
2008	Itazura na Kiss	Kotoko Aihara	married name Irie	
2008	Junjo Romantica: Pure Romance	Kaoruko Usami	first season	
2008	Kyōran Kazoku Nikki	Oasis		
2008	Rosario + Vampire Capu2	Moka Akashiya		
2008	Shugo Chara!! Doki	Utau Hoshina		
2008	Junjo Romantica: Pure Romance	Kaoruko Usami	second season	
2009	White Album	Rina Ogata		
2009	Minami-ke: Okaeri	Tōma Minami		
2009	Rideback	Rin Ogata		
2009	Polyphonica Crimson S	Yugiri Perserte		
2009	Fullmetal Alchemist: Brotherhood	Lan Fan		
2009	Kämpfer	Kanden Yamaneko		
2009	Tegami Bachi	Sylvette Suede		
2009	Shugo Chara! Party!	Utau Hoshina		
2009	Darker Than Black: Ryūsei no Gemini	Misaki Kirihara		
2009	Aoi Bungaku Series	Akiko	"In the Forest, Under Cherries in Full Bloom" episodes	
2010	HeartCatch PreCure!	Tsubomi Hanasaki / Cure Blossom		
2010	Black Butler II	Alois Trancy		
2010	Tegami Bachi: Reverse	Sylvette Suede		
2011	Hourou Musuko	Nitori Maho		
2011	Dog Days	Ricotta Elmar		
2011	Toriko	Tina		
2011	Blood-C	Saya Kisaragi		
2012	Senki Zesshō Symphogear	Tsubasa Kazanari		
2012	Naruto SD: Rock Lee & His Ninja Pals	Hinata Hyūga		
2012	Jinrui wa Suitaishimashita	Pion		
2012	Dog Days'	Ricotta Elmar, Nanami Takatsuki		
2012	Blast of Tempest	Evangeline Yamamoto		
2012	Magi: The Labyrinth of Magic	Ren Hakuei		
2012	Medaka Box Abnormal	Ajimu Najimi		
2013	Minami-ke Tadaima	Tōma Minami		
2013	Valvrave the Liberator	Kriemhild	two seasons	
2013	Senki Zesshō Symphogear G	Tsubasa Kazanari		
2013	Magi: The Kingdom of Magic	Ren Hakuei		
2014	Nobunaga Concerto	Kichō		
2014	Cross Ange	Angelise Ikaruga Misurugi		
2015	Dog Days	Ricotta Elmar, Nanami Takatsuki		
2015	Magical Girl Lyrical Nanoha ViVid	Fate Testarossa		
2015	Gunslinger Stratos	Kumi Minakata		
2015	Blood Blockade Battlefront	Michella Watch		
2015–16	Ushio and Tora	Hinowa Sekimori	Two seasons	
2015	Senki Zesshō Symphogear GX	Tsubasa Kazanari		
2015	Junjou Romantica	Kaoruko Usami	Third season	
2015	The Seven Deadly Sins	Margaret Liones		
2016	Snow White with the Red Hair	Torou	Second season	
2016	The Seven Deadly Sins: Signs of Holy War	Margaret Liones		
2016	Love Live! Sunshine!!	Riko's mother		
2016	This Art Club Has a Problem!	Yumeko Tachibana		
2016	WWW.Working!!	Kisaki Kondou, Hime Kondou	Replaced Risa Taneda	
2016	Monster Hunter Stories: Ride On	Simone		
2016	Idol Memories	Shouko Shirayuki	Anime/live-action hybrid	
2016	Love Live! Sunshine!!	Sakurauchi Riko's mother	eps 5, 8, 10	
2017–23	Boruto: Naruto Next Generations	Hinata Uzumaki		
2017	The Silver Guardian	Phoebe		
2017	Warau Salesman NEW	Chikako Shimai	episode 12	
2017	Senki Zesshō Symphogear AXZ	Tsubasa Kazanari	season 4	
2017	Hell Girl: Yoi no Togi	Tsugumi Shibata	season 4 episode 4	
2017	Blood Blockade Battlefront & Beyond	Michella Watch		
2017–21	Black Clover	Vanessa Enoteca		
2018	Basilisk: Ouka Ninpouchou	Narrator, Oboro Iga		
2018	The Seven Deadly Sins: Revival of the Commandments	Margaret Liones		
2018	Pop Team Epic	Popuko	Episode 11	
2018	Waka Okami wa Shōgakusei!	Matsuki Akino		
2018	Persona 5: The Animation	Ann Takamaki		
2018	Grand Blue	Kaya Mizuki		
2018	Xuan Yuan Sword Luminary	Fu Yin		
2019	Manaria Friends	Hanna		
2019	Dororo	Mio		
2019	Kono Oto Tomare! Sounds of Life	Isaki Kudō		
2019	Senki Zesshō Symphogear XV	Tsubasa Kazanari	Season 5	
2019–present	One Piece	Kozuki Hiyori (Komurasaki)		
2020	Listeners	Bilin Valentine		
2020	Sakura Wars the Animation	Elise		
2020	Obake Zukan	Bonyan		
2020	Dragon's Dogma	Hannah		
2020	The Gymnastics Samurai	Ayu		
2020	D4DJ First Mix	Airi Amano		
2021–23	Don't Toy with Me, Miss Nagatoro	Club President Sana Sunomiya	two seasons	
2021	Life Lessons with Uramichi Oniisan	Utano Tadano		
2021	Kanashiki Debu Neko-chan	Madonna		
2021	Digimon Ghost Game	Sirenmon	Episode 6	
2022	Tomodachi Game	Reiko Tamai		
2022	Urusei Yatsura	Kurama		
2023	The Family Circumstances of the Irregular Witch	Viola		
2023	I'm in Love with the Villainess	Manaria Sousse		
2024	Shaman King: Flowers	Tamao Tamamura		
2024	Highspeed Etoile	Alice Summerwood		
2024	Dandadan	Seiko Ayase		
2024	Tying the Knot with an Amagami Sister	Mahiru Anekōji		
2024	Fairy Tail: 100 Years Quest	Selene		
2025	Ameku M.D.: Doctor Detective	Mazuru Ameku		
2025	Ishura Season 2	Kazuki the Black Tone		
2025	I'm a Noble on the Brink of Ruin, So I Might as Well Try Mastering Magic	Shiela		
2025	Witch Watch	Ibuki Wakatsuki		
2025	Princession Orchestra	Red Queen/Princess Shinku		
2025	Toilet-Bound Hanako-kun Season 2	Mitsuba Sousuke's Mother		
2026	Noble Reincarnation: Born Blessed, So I'll Obtain Ultimate Power	Queen		
2026	Magical Girl Lyrical Nanoha Exceeds Gun Blaze Vengeance	Fate T. Harlaown		
2026	Jujutsu Kaisen	Takako Uro		
2026	The Forsaken Saintess and Her Foodie Roadtrip in Another World	Plankster		
2026	Red River	Ursula		
2026	Vertex Force	EDVA		

=== Original video animation ===
List of voice performances in OVA
Year	Title	Role	Notes	Sources
2001	Happy Lesson	Minazuki Rokumatsuri		
2001	Love Hina Spring Special	Nyamo Namo		
2001	Memories Off 2nd	Hotaru Shirakawa		
2002	Generation of Chaos Next	Roji		
2003	Memories Off 2nd Special: Nocturne	Hotaru Shirakawa		
2004	Happy Lesson The Final	Minazuki Rokumatsuri		
2004	Hourglass of Summer	Kaho Serizawa		
2004	Memories Off 3.5	Hotaru Shirakawa		
2005	Fighting Fantasy Girl Rescue Me! Mave-chan	Mave-chan		
2005	Ichigo 100%	Yui Minamito	Four OVA series	
2005	King of Bandit Jing in Seventh Heaven	Catsusu		
2006	Fullmetal Alchemist: Premium Collection	Wrath		
2006	Fullmetal Alchemist: Seven Homunculi vs State Alchemist	Wrath		
2006	Baldr Force EXE Resolution	Ryang		
2007	Tales of Symphonia: The Animation	Colette Brunel		
2007	Tokyo Marble Chocolate	Chizuru	Premiered at the 20th Tokyo International Film Festival	
2009	Saint Seiya: The Lost Canvas	Pandora		
2009	Shoujo Fight: Norainu-tachi no Odekake	Neri Ooishi		
2009	Minami-ke: Betsubara	Tōma Minami		
2010	Tales of Symphonia: Tethe'alla Hen	Colette Brunel		
2010	Bungaku Shoujo: Memoire	Nanase Kotobuki		
2011	Kämpfer für die Liebe	Kanden Yamaneko		
2011	Saint Seiya: The Lost Canvas - Meiō Shinwa 2	Pandora		
2011	Tales of Symphonia: The United World	Colette Brunel		
2012	Minami-ke Omatase	Tōma Minami		
2014	Terra Formars	Maria Viren		
2015	Blood Blockade Battlefront	Michella Watch		
2016	The Day Naruto Became Hokage	Hinata Hyuga		
2016	Persona 5: The Day Breakers	Ann Takamaki		
2019	Is the Order a Rabbit?? 〜Sing For You〜	Saki Kafuu	Chino's mother	
2020	5th Tenchi Muyo!	Neju Na Melmas		

=== Anime films ===
List of voice performances in anime films
Year	Title	Role	Notes	Sources
2002	Welcome to Pia Carrot: Sayaka no Koi-monogatari	Noriko Shima		
2004	Naruto the Movie: Konoha Sports Festival	Hinata Hyūga		
2004	Pocket Monsters Advanced Generation the Movie: Deoxys the Visitor	Audrey		
2005	Fullmetal Alchemist the Movie: Conqueror of Shamballa	Wrath		
2007	Naruto: Shippūden the Movie	Hinata Hyūga		
2007	JoJo's Bizarre Adventure: Phantom Blood	Erina Pendleton		
2008	The Garden of Sinners: Oblivion Recording	Misaya Ouji		
2008	Naruto Shippūden 2: Bonds	Hinata Hyūga		
2009	Keroro Gunso the Super Movie 4: Gekishin Dragon Warriors	Sion		
2009	Detective Conan: The Raven Chaser	Reporter Yoshii		
2009	Professor Layton and the Eternal Diva	Janice Quatlane		
2009	Naruto Shippūden 3: Inheritors of the Will of Fire	Hinata Hyūga		
2010	Bungaku Shoujo	Nanase Kotobuki		
2010	Magical Girl Lyrical Nanoha The Movie 1st	Fate Testarossa, Alicia Testarossa		
2010	Pretty Cure All Stars DX2: Light of Hope - Protect the Rainbow Jewel!	Tsubomi Hanasaki / Cure Blossom		
2010	HeartCatch PreCure! the Movie: Fashion Show in the Flower Capital... Really?!	Tsubomi Hanasaki / Cure Blossom		
2011	Tezuka Osamu no Buddha -Akai Sabaku yo! Utsukushiku-	Migaila		
2011	Pretty Cure All Stars DX3: Deliver the Future! The Rainbow-Colored Flower That Connects the World	Tsubomi Hanasaki / Cure Blossom		
2011	Pocket Monsters Best Wishes! The Movie: Victini and the Black Hero: Zekrom	Victini		
2011	Pocket Monsters Best Wishes! The Movie: Victini and the White Hero: Reshiram	Victini		
2012	Magic Tree House	Mother		
2012	Pretty Cure All Stars New Stage: Friends of the Future	Tsubomi Hanasaki / Cure Blossom		
2012	Blood-C: The Last Dark	Saya Kisaragi		
2012	Magical Girl Lyrical Nanoha The Movie 2nd A's	Fate Testarossa, Alicia Testarossa		
2012	Naruto the Movie: Road to Ninja	Hinata Hyūga		
2012	Doraemon: Nobita and the Island of Miracles ~Animal Adventure~	Koron		
2012	Fuse Teppō Musume no Torimonochō	Itezuru		
2013	Pretty Cure All Stars New Stage 2: Friends of the Heart	Tsubomi Hanasaki / Cure Blossom		
2013	Toriko Movie: Bishokushin no Special Menu	Tina		
2013	Kaiketsu Zorori Mamoru ze! Kyōryū no Tamago	Dina		
2014	Buddha 2: Tezuka Osamu no Buddha ~Owarinaki Tabi~	Migaila		
2014	Tiger & Bunny: The Rising	Kasha Graham		
2014	The Last: Naruto the Movie	Hinata Hyūga		
2014	Pretty Cure All Stars New Stage 3: Eternal Friends	Tsubomi Hanasaki / Cure Blossom		
2015	Boruto: Naruto the Movie	Hinata Uzumaki		
2015	Pretty Cure All Stars: Spring Carnival	Tsubomi Hanasaki / Cure Blossom		
2016	Rudolf the Black Cat	Misha		
2016	Pretty Cure All Stars: Singing with Everyone Miraculous Magic!	Tsubomi Hanasaki / Cure Blossom		
2016	Monster Strike The Movie	Arthur		
2017	Magical Girl Lyrical Nanoha Reflection	Fate Testarossa, Levi Of Lightning		
2018	Magical Girl Lyrical Nanoha Detonation	Fate Testarossa, Levi Of Lightning		
2018	Dragon Ball Super: Broly	Chirai		
2018	Hug! Pretty Cure Futari wa Pretty Cure: All Stars Memories	Tsubomi Hanasaki / Cure Blossom		
2019	Even if the World Will End Tomorrow	Yūri		
2020	Monster Strike The Movie: Lucifer Zetsubō no Yoake	Arthur		
2020	BEM: Become Human	Emma		
2021	Tropical-Rouge! Pretty Cure the Movie: The Snow Princess and the Miraculous Ring!	Tsubomi Hanasaki / Cure Blossom		
2021	The Seven Deadly Sins: Cursed by Light	Margaret Liones		
2022	Isekai Quartet: The Movie – Another World	Vera Mitrohina		
2022	Dragon Ball Super: Super Hero	Chirai		
2022	Drifting Home	Satoko Tonai		
2023	Black Clover: Sword of the Wizard King	Vanessa Enoteca		
2023	Pretty Guardian Sailor Moon Cosmos The Movie	Princess Kakyuu / Sailor Kakyuu		
2023	Pretty Cure All Stars F	Tsubomi Hanasaki / Cure Blossom		
2024	Crayon Shin-chan the Movie: Our Dinosaur Diary	Nana		
2025	The Obsessed	Pechka's mother		
2026	Made in Abyss: Mezameru Shinpi	Srajo		

=== Drama CD ===
List of voice performances in drama CD
Year	Title	Role	Notes	Sources
2001	Happy Lesson Drama CD	6-years-old Minazuki Rokumatsuri		
2001	Memories Off Drama CD: Bridge	Hotaru Shirakawa		
2002	Shichinin no Nana: Side Story of Nana	Nana Suzuki		
2002	Minna de Tsukuru Memo Off! CD	Hotaru Shirakawa		
2002	Rusuden Memories	Hotaru Shirakawa		
2003	Junk Force	Liza		
2003	Memories Off Drama CD: Omoide ni Kawaru Kimi	Hotaru Shirakawa		
2003	Shin Megami Tensei 3: Nocturne Drama CD	Tachibana Chiaki		
2003	Nurse Witch Komugi	Hayase		
2004	Magical Girl Lyrical Nanoha Sound Stage	Fate Testarossa		
2004	Memories Off Drama CD: Omoide no Partita	Hotaru Shirakawa		
2004	Drama CD Ichigo 100%	Yui Minamito		
2004	Naruto drama CD series	Hinata Hyuga		
2004	2x2=Shinobuden	Shinobu		
2004	Rozen Maiden Drama CD	Suiseiseki		
2004	Ragnarok The Animation Drama CD	Yufa		
2004	Memories Off: And Then Drama CD	Hotaru Shirakawa		
2004	Tales of Symphonia: A Long Time Ago	Colette Brunel		
2004	Koi Koi 7 Drama CD	Yayoi Asuka (Celonius 28)		
2004	Tactics Drama CD	Suzu Edogawa		
2005	Magical Girl Lyrical Nanoha A's Sound Stage	Fate Testarossa		
2005	Itazura na Kiss	Kotoko Aihara		
2005	Basilisk	Oboro		
2005	Ichigo 100% Drama Theater	Yui Minamito		
2005	Elemental Gelade React	Cisqua		
2005	Secret of Cactus	Nami Minase		
2005	Tales of Symphonia: Rodeo Ride Tour	Colette Brunel		
2006	Magical Girl Lyrical Nanoha A's Sound Stage 02	Fate Testarossa		
2006	Magical Girl Lyrical Nanoha A's Sound Stage 03	Fate Testarossa		
2006	Ichigo 100% Last Take East Side	Yui Minamito		
2006	Ichigo 100% Last Take West Side	Yui Minamito		
2006	Yoshinaga-san Chi no Gargoyle	Lili		
2006	Rosario + Vampire	Moka Akashiya		
2006	Kagihime Monogatari Eikyū Alice Rondo: Kiraha's Story	Akane Akatsuki	Episode 4	
2006	Aquarian Age Drama CD Vol.1	Alice		
2006	Kotonoha no Miko to Kotodama no Majo to Drama CD	Sarasa		
2007	Magical Girl Lyrical Nanoha StrikerS Sound Stage 01	Fate T. Harlaown		
2007	Magical Girl Lyrical Nanoha StrikerS Sound Stage 02	Fate T. Harlaown		
2007	Magical Girl Lyrical Nanoha StrikerS Sound Stage 03	Fate T. Harlaown		
2007	Magical Girl Lyrical Nanoha StrikerS Sound Stage 04	Fate T. Harlaown		
2007	Shuraki Trinity	Towako Mizuchi		
2007	Rosario + Vampire drama CD 2	Moka Akashiya		
2007	Shining Wind drama CD vol.1	Kanon Seena		
2008	Minamike Drama CD	Tōma Minami	KICA-897	
2008	Ayakashi Characters 1	Eim Yoake	ZMCZ-3901	
2008	Ayakashi Characters 3	Eim Yoake	ZMCZ-3903	
2008	Ayakashi Characters 4	Eim Yoake	ZMCZ-3904	
2008	Ayakashi Characters 5	Eim Yoake	ZMCZ-3905	
2008	Minamike Okawari Drama CD	Tōma Minami	KICA-905	
2009	Magical Girl Lyrical Nanoha The Movie First Ticket CD Special	Fate T. Harlaown		
2009	Requiem et Reminiscence	Maria Klose		
2009	Minamike Okaeri Drama CD	Tōma Minami	KICA-971	
2010	White Album Sound Stage 01	Rina Ogata	KICA-2501	
2010	White Album Sound Stage 02	Rina Ogata	KICA-2502	
2014	Re:Born: The Masked Man and Princess Knight	Sapphire		
2016	Persona 5: The Night Breakers	Anne Takamaki		
2017	Drama CD "Wonderland Wars" Side Story 2	Miyuki Osamu		
2018	Azfareo no Sobayounin	Lukul		
2020	Uramichi Oniisan	Utano Tadano		

=== Tokusatsu ===
List of acting performances in tokusatsu
Year	Title	Role	Notes
1999	Voicelugger	Hiromi Minami	
2010	Zebraman 2: Attack on Zebra City	Alien	
2013	Kamen Rider × Super Sentai × Space Sheriff: Super Hero Taisen Z	Pxycholon	
2024–25	Bakuage Sentai Boonboomger	Ittasha	

=== Television drama/Movie ===
List of acting performances
Year	Title	Role	Notes
2011	Switch Girl!!	Narrator	two season
2017	Mischievous Kiss the Movie Part 1: High School		
2020	Obake Zukan	Bōnyan	short drama
2022	Sono Koe no Anata e	Herself	Documentary film
2025	Unbound	Cie no Naishi	Taiga drama

=== Video games ===
List of voice performances in video games
Year	Title	Platform	Role	Notes	Sources
1998	NOëL ~La neige~	PlayStation	Chisato Kadokura	debut	
1999	Little Witch Reinette ~Swan no Namida Rhapsody~ Reinette Kirsche	Personal computer	Reinette Kirsche		
1999	Little Witch Parfait ~Kuronekojirushi no Mahouya-san~ Reinette Kirsche	Personal computer	Reinette Kirsche		
2000	O-Hanabatake no Flore	Personal computer	Reinette Kirsche		
2001	Sister Princess	PlayStation	Aria		
2001	Sister Princess: Pure Stories	PlayStation	Aria		
2001	Generation of Chaos	PlayStation 2	Roji		
2001	Happy Lesson	Dreamcast	Minazuki Rokumatsuri		
2001	Memories Off 2nd	Dreamcast	Hotaru Shirakawa		
2002	Hourglass of Summer	PlayStation 2, personal computer	Kaho Serizawa		
2002	Reveal Fantasia	PlayStation 2	Heizel		
2002	Power DoLLS 5	Personal computer	Eris Titaneer		
2002	Generation of Chaos Next	PlayStation 2	Roji		
2002	Shaman King: Spirit of Shamans	PlayStation	Tamao Tamamura		
2002	Shaman King: Shaman King Chō Senjiryokketsu 3	Game Boy Advance	Tamao Tamamura		
2003	Memories Off Duet	PlayStation 2	Hotaru Shirakawa		
2003	Sister Princess 2	PlayStation	Aria		
2003	Tales of Symphonia	GameCube	Colette Brunel		
2003	Generation of Chaos 3	PlayStation 2	Roji		
2003	Fullmetal Alchemist and the Broken Angel	PlayStation 2	Armony Eiselstein		
2003	Naruto: Ultimate Ninja	PlayStation 2	Hinata Hyuga		
2003	Naruto: Clash of Ninja 2	GameCube	Hinata Hyuga		
2004	You that Become A Memory: Memories Off	Personal computer	Hotaru Shirakawa		
2004	Memories Off: And Then	PlayStation 2, personal computer	Hotaru Shirakawa		
2004	Tales of Symphonia	PlayStation 2	Colette Brunel		
2004	Black/Matrix 00	PlayStation	Luca		
2004	Fullmetal Alchemist: Dream Carnival		Wrath		
2004	Naruto: Ultimate Ninja 2	PlayStation 2	Hinata Hyuga		
2004	Naruto: Clash of Ninja 3	GameCube	Hinata Hyuga		
2005	Princess Maker 4	PlayStation 2	Daughter		
2005	Ichigo 100% Strawberry Diary	PlayStation 2	Yui Minamoto		
2005	Tales of the World: Narikiri Dungeon 3	Game Boy Advance	Colette Brunel		
2005	Elemental Gelade: Matoe, Suifu no Ken	PlayStation 2	Cisqua		
2005	Elemental Gelade: Tozasareshi Uta	Game Boy Advance	Cisqua		
2005	Bottle Fairy: Haru.Natsu.Aki.Fuyu Sensei-san to Issho	Personal computer	Kururu		
2005	Naruto: Ultimate Ninja 3	PlayStation 2	Hinata Hyuga		
2006	Princess Maker 4	personal computer, PlayStation Portable	Daughter		
2006	Wild Arms 5 the Vth Vanguard	PlayStation 2	Rebecca Streisand		
2006	Summon Night 4	PlayStation 2	Enishia		
2007	Tales of Fandom Vol.2	PlayStation 2	Colette Brunel		
2007	Shining Wind	PlayStation 2	Kanon Seena		
2007	Shining Force EXA	PlayStation 2	Amitalilly		
2007	Simoun: Shōbi Sensō - Fūin no Remersion	PlayStation 2	Morinas		
2007	Atelier Lise: Alchemist of Ordre	Nintendo DS	Lolotte Stasille		
2008	Rune Factory 2	Nintendo DS	Mana		
2008	Rosario + Vampire: Tanabata's Miss Yokai Academy	Nintendo DS	Moka Akashiya		
2008	Tales of Symphonia: Dawn of the New World	Wii	Colette Brunel		
2008	Need for Speed: Undercover	Xbox 360	Chase Linh		
2008	Star Ocean: The Second Evolution	PlayStation Portable	Rena Lanford		
2008	Avalon Code	Nintendo DS	Dorothe		
2009	Rosario + Vampire Capu2: The Rhapsody of Love and Dreams	PlayStation 2	Moka Akashiya		
2009	Granado Espada	personal computer	Mifuyu		
2009	Luminous Arc 3: Eyes	Nintendo DS	Ashley		
2009	Shining Force Cross	Arcade	Narrator		
2009	Triggerheart Exelica -Enhanced-	PlayStation 2	Faintear		
2010	White Album	PlayStation 3	Rina Ogata		
2010	Naruto Shippūden: Ultimate Ninja Storm 2	PlayStation 3, Xbox 360	Hinata Hyuga		
2010	Magical Girl Lyrical Nanoha A's Portable: The Battle of Aces	PlayStation Portable	Fate Testarossa/Levi the Slasher		
2010	Metal Gear Solid: Peace Walker		Paz Ortega Andrade / Pacifica Ocean		
2010	Super Robot Taisen OG Saga: Endless Frontier Exceed	Nintendo DS	Neige Hausen		
2010	Fullmetal Alchemist: To the Promised Day	PlayStation Portable	Lan Fan		
2010	Naruto Shippūden: Kizuna Drive	PlayStation Portable	Hinata Hyuga		
2010	Shining Hearts	PlayStation Portable	Maxima Enfield		
2010	Weekly Toro Station	PlayStation 3	Toro Inoue, Kuro and TV		
2011	7th Dragon 2020	PlayStation Portable	Natsume Hikasa, Unit 13		
2011	Phantasy Star Portable 2 Infinity		Nagisa		
2011	Phantom Breaker		Mikoto Nishina		
2011	Final Fantasy Type-0		Claes Celestia Misuka Sansest		
2011	Magical Girl Lyrical Nanoha A's Portable: The Gears of Destiny	PlayStation Portable	Fate Testarossa/Levi the Slasher		
2011	TERA		Velik		
2012	Resident Evil: Revelations	Nintendo 3DS	Jessica Sherawat		
2012	Shining Blade	PlayStation Portable	Sakuya, Kanon		
2013	7th Dragon 2020-II	PlayStation Portable	Unit 13		
2013	Shining Ark	PlayStation Portable	Viola, Seraphim		
2014	Corpse Seed 3: Heartclub Extreme	Arcade, Nintendo Wii U	Honoka Yamato		
2014	Gunslinger Stratos 2		Minakata Kumi		
2014	Metal Gear Solid V: Ground Zeroes		Paz Ortega Andrade		
2014	Shining Resonance		Excela Noa Aura		
2014	Super Heroine Chronicle	PlayStation 3, PlayStation Vita	Tsubasa Kazanari		
2015	Final Fantasy Type-0 HD		Claes Celestia Misuka Sansest		
2015	7th Dragon III Code: VFD	Nintendo 3DS	Unit 13		
2015	Cross Ange tr.	PlayStation Vita	Angelise Ikaruga Misurugi		
2015	Metal Gear Solid V: The Phantom Pain		Paz Ortega Andrade		
2015	Blade Arcus from Shining EX		Sakuya		
2016	Persona 5	PlayStation 3, PlayStation 4	Ann Takamaki, Carmen (Persona awakening voice)		
2016	Dragon Quest Heroes II		Ornaze		
2016	Summon Night 6:Lost Borders		Enishia		
2016	Senki Zesshō Symphogear XD Unlimited		Tsubasa Kazanari		
2016	Star Ocean: Anamnesis		Rena Lanford		
2017	Tales of Asteria		Colette Brunel		
2017	Granblue Fantasy	Mobile	Hannah		
2017	Corpse Seed 4	Arcade, Nintendo Switch	Honoka Yamato		
2017	Super Robot Wars V	PlayStation 4, PlayStation Vita	Ange		
2018	Super Robot Wars X-Ω	Smartphone	Ange		
2018	Honkai Impact 3rd	Mobile	Kallen Kaslana		
2018	Iron Saga	Mobile	Taylor		
2018	Persona 5: Dancing in Starlight	PlayStation 4	Ann Takamaki		
2018	Onsen Musume Yunohana Collection	Smartphone	Sunahiko		
2018	Memories Off -Innocent Fille-	PlayStation 4	Hotaru Shirakawa		
2018	Black Clover: Quartet Knights	PlayStation 4	Vanessa Enoteca		
2018	Onmyoji Arena	Mobile	Aoandon		
2018	Persona Q2: New Cinema Labyrinth	Nintendo 3DS	Ann Takamaki		
2018	Shining Resonance Refrain	Nintendo Switch	Excela Noa Aura		
2019	BLADE ARCUS Rebellion from Shining	PlayStation 4/Nintendo Switch	Excela Noa Aura		
2019	Catherine: Full Body	PlayStation 4/PlayStation Vita	DLC Catherine, Ann Takamaki		
2019	Super Smash Bros. Ultimate	Nintendo Switch	Ann Takamaki	DLC	
2019	Death Stranding	PlayStation 4	Fragile		
2019	Fate/Grand Order	Mobile	Nagao Kagetora		
2019	Arknights	Mobile	Mostima		
2019	Sakura Wars		Elise		
2019	MapleStory	Personal computer	Pathfinder		
2019	The Seven Deadly Sins: Grand Cross	iOS/Android	Margaret Liones, Ludociel		
2019	Epic Seven	iOS/Android	Tamarine		
2019	Persona 5 Royal	PlayStation 4	Ann Takamaki		
2020	Final Gear	Mobile			
2020	Persona 5 Strikers	PlayStation 4/Nintendo Switch	Ann Takamaki		
2021	Fire Emblem Heroes	Mobile	Nótt		
2021	DC Super Hero Girls: Teen Power	Nintendo Switch	Bumblebee / Karen Beecher		
2021	Counter:Side	iOS, Android, Microsoft Windows	Yanagi Mina(Yoo Mina)		
2022	Fitness Runners	Nintendo Switch	Scarlet		
2023	Higan: Eruthyll	iOS/Android	Gyldan		
2023	Persona 5 Tactica		Ann Takamaki		
2025	Death Stranding 2: On the Beach	PlayStation 5	Fragile		
2025	Genshin Impact	PC, iOS, Android, PS4/5, Xbox Series X/S	Nefer		
2026	Punishing: Gray Raven		Aisling		

=== Dubbing roles ===
List of dubbing performances
Year	Title	Role	Original performer	Notes	Sources
2003	Me Without You	Marina	Anna Friel		
2003	The World of Happy Planet	Sparkle, Emily	Caroline Combes		
2004	Bring It On Again	Whittier Smith	Anne Judson-Yager		
2005	Are We There Yet	Lindsey Kingston	Aleisha Allen		
2005	Ewoks	Nippet	Leanne Coppen		
2006	Ultraviolet	Six	Cameron Bright		
2006	Minority Report	Agatha Lively	Samantha Morton		
2006	It Started with a Kiss	Yuan Xiang Qin	Ariel Lin		
2011†‡	Special Agent Oso	Paw Pilot	Meghan Strange	Animation	
2008	They Kiss Again	Yuan Xiang Qin	Ariel Lin		
2009	The Good Wife	Sloan Burchfield	Miranda Cosgrove		
2009	My Mighty Princess	Kang So-Hwi	Shin Min-a		
2010	Glee	Quinn Fabray	Dianna Agron		
2010	iCarly (2007)	Carly Shay	Miranda Cosgrove		
2010	The Naked Kitchen	Ahn Mo-rae	Shin Min-a		
2011	Playful Kiss	Oh-Ha Ni	Jung So-min		
2011	I Am Number Four	Sarah Hart	Dianna Agron		
2012	Iron Man: Armored Adventures	Madame Masque	Kristie Marsden	Animation	
2012†‡	The Hunger Games	Katniss Everdeen	Jennifer Lawrence		
2013	Evil Dead	Mia Allen	Jane Levy		
2013‡	The Hunger Games: Catching Fire	Katniss Everdeen	Jennifer Lawrence		
2013	The Family	Belle Blake/Belle Manzoni	Dianna Agron		
2013	Can We Get Married?	Hye-yoon	Jung So-min		
2014	The Monkey King	Princess Iron Fan	Joe Chen		
2014	Prince of Lan Ling	Yang Xuewu	Ariel Lin		
2015	The Hunger Games: Mockingjay – Part 1	Katniss Everdeen	Jennifer Lawrence		
2015	The Hunger Games: Mockingjay – Part 2	Katniss Everdeen	Jennifer Lawrence		
2015	The Intruders	Rose Halshford	Miranda Cosgrove		
2016	Dragon Blade	Cold Moon	Lin Peng		
2016	The Huntsman: Winter's War	Freya the Ice Queen	Emily Blunt		
2016	Our Times	Tao Min-min	Dewi Chien		
2017	Don't Breathe	Rocky	Jane Levy		
2017‡	Sing	Betty	Tara Strong	Animation	
2017‡	Passengers	Aurora Lane	Jennifer Lawrence		
2017	Power Rangers	Trini Kwan/Yellow Ranger	Becky G		
2017	Miss in Kiss	Xiang Yue Qin	Esther Wu		
2018	Serena	Serena Pemberton	Jennifer Lawrence		
2019	PAW Patrol	Katie	Katherine Forrester		
2019	Castle Rock	Jackie	Jane Levy		
2019	Captain Marvel	Carol Danvers / Captain Marvel	Brie Larson		
2019	Avengers: Endgame	Carol Danvers / Captain Marvel	Brie Larson		
2019	Between Two Ferns: The Movie	Brie Larson			
2020	The Knight of Shadows: Between Yin and Yang	Jing Yao	Lin Peng		
2020	Big Brother	Liang Yingxin	Joe Chen		
2020	DC Super Hero Girls	Karen Beecher / Bumblebee	Kimberly Brooks	Animation	
2020	Spicy Girl	Xiao So			
2020	Running Wild with Bear Grylls	Brie Larson			
2021	The Suicide Squad	Emilia Harcourt	Jennifer Holland		
2021‡	Jappeloup	Nadia	Marina Hands	BS TV Tokyo edition	
2021	What If...?	Carol Danvers / Captain Marvel	Alexandra Daniels	Animation	
2021	Shang-Chi and the Legend of the Ten Rings	Carol Danvers	Brie Larson		
2021	No Time to Die	Paloma	Ana de Armas		
2021	The Matrix Resurrections	Sati	Priyanka Chopra		
2022	Peacemaker	Emilia Harcourt	Jennifer Holland		
2022	Black Adam	Emilia Harcourt	Jennifer Holland		
2022	Blonde	Marilyn Monroe	Ana de Armas		
2023	Lyle, Lyle, Crocodile	Mrs. Primm	Constance Wu		
2023	Shazam! Fury of the Gods	Emilia Harcourt	Jennifer Holland		
2023	Fast X	Tess	Brie Larson		
2023	The Marvels	Carol Danvers	Brie Larson		
2023	Maestro	Felicia Montealegre Bernstein	Carey Mulligan		
2024	Operation Napoleon	Kristín Johannesdottír	Vivian Ólafsdóttir		
2025	iCarly (2021)	Carly Shay	Miranda Cosgrove		
2025	Ballerina	Eve Macarro	Ana de Armas		
2025	Zootopia 2	Dr. Fuzzby	Quinta Brunson	Animation	
2026	The Bad Guys 2‡	Kitty Kat	Danielle Brooks	Animation	
2026	Gameoverse	Kit Bodega	Erica Lindbeck	Animation	
2026	The Odyssey	Helen of Troy/Clytemnestra	Lupita Nyong'o		

† Year of original release
‡ Year of Japanese release
