= List of works published by Kodansha =

The following is a list of works published by Kodansha and its subsidiaries, such as manga published by foreign subsidiaries, books, novels and light novels, and others, listed by release date.

Including titles from:

- Kodansha
- Kobunsha
- Seikaisha
- Scola (1981-2001)
- King Records
- Starchild Records
- Vertical
- ASK-Kodansha (1981-1998)
- Asmik Ace Entertainment (1985-1995)
- Del Rey Manga
- Kodansha International
- Kodansha Globe
- Kodansha Amer
- Kodansha Europe

== 1920s ==
=== 1921 ===
- A Dark Night's Passing

== 1930s ==
=== 1933 ===
- Daitō no Tetsujin

=== 1936 ===
- The Fiend with Twenty Faces

=== 1937 ===
- Shōnen Tanteidan

== 1940s ==
=== 1947 ===
- The Bells of Nagasaki

== 1950s ==
=== 1951 ===
- The Chinese Maze Murders

=== 1955 ===
- Flying Saucer from Mars
- Windows to the Sun and Moon

=== 1957 ===
- Shōden Shinkage-ryū

=== 1958 ===
- Nip the Buds, Shoot the Kids

=== 1959 ===
- Fukurō no Shiro

== 1960s ==
=== 1960 ===
- Star

=== 1963 ===
- The Sailor Who Fell from Grace with the Sea

=== 1965 ===
- Bunraku: The Art of the Japanese Puppet Theatre

=== 1966 ===
- Atama no Taisou
- The Doctor's Wife
- Masonry in Japan: The First One Hundred Years, 1866-1966
- My Forsaken Star

=== 1967 ===
- Modern Japanese Painting: An Art in Transition

=== 1968 ===
- Hana no techō: No no hana
- Nagasaki Kyoryūchi: Hitotsu no Nihon Kindaishi
- Sun and Steel

=== 1969 ===
- Comprehensive Asian Fighting Arts

== 1970s ==
=== 1971 ===
- The Anatomy of Dependence
- Nihon no kaboku
- The Southern barbarians : the first Europeans in Japan

=== 1972 ===
- 44 Modern Japanese Print Artists
- Court Transcript of the Yukio Mishima Incident
- Papelucho
- Steam Locomotives of Japan

=== 1973 ===
- Japan Sinks
- Karate-Do Kyohan: The Master Text
- Psychic School Wars
- This Island of Japon: Joao Rodrigues’s Account of 16th Century Japan

=== 1974 ===
- A Haiku Journey
- The Lake
- Nihongo no kokoro
- Tsutsuji, satsuki, shakunage

=== 1975 ===
- Karate-Do: My Way of Life
- The Twenty Guiding Principles of Karate: The Spiritual Legacy of the Master
- War-Wasted Asia: letters, 1945–46
- Yōseiden

=== 1976 ===
- Almost Transparent Blue
- Chiteki seikatsu no hōhō

=== 1977 ===
- 「Nihonrashisa」no kōzō
- Dynamic Aikido

=== 1978 ===
- Best Karate, Vol. 3: Kumite 1
- Best Karate, Vol 4: Kumite 2
- Japanese Film Directors
- Landscapes and Portraits: Appreciations of Japanese culture
- Nihon-den Jujutsu
- Some Japanese Portraits

=== 1979 ===
- Hear the Wind Sing
- Papilionidae and their early stages
- The Reluctant Admiral
- Wonder of the World's Dinosaurs
- Zoku-Chiteki seikatsu no hōhō

== 1980s ==
=== 1980 ===
- Coin Locker Babies
- Japonisme in Art, Art Symposium
- On a Certain, Fine Day, Stands Wien in the Forest
- Pinball, 1973

=== 1981 ===
- Biographical Dictionary of Japanese
- The Devil's Gluttony
- Karate-do: My Way of Life
- Sanshouo
- Stick Fighting
- Totto-Chan: The Little Girl at the Window

=== 1982 ===
- Currents in Japanese Cinema
- The Faust Age
- Ideals of the Samurai: Writings of Japanese Warriors
- Smaller Is Better, Japan's Mastery of the Miniature
- Utamaro: Portraits from the Floating World
- A Wild Sheep Chase

=== 1983 ===
- Daijiten Desuku
- Hayao Miyazaki's Image Board Collection
- The Japanese sword
- Kiseto and Setoguro (Famous Ceramics of Japan)
- Kodansha Encyclopedia of Japan
- Manga! Manga! The World of Japanese Comics
- Nanako My Love: Azuma Hideo Illust Book
- Nihon no Budō Vol.11
- The Strange Library

=== 1984 ===
- Banjos: The Tsumura Collection
- Midnight Suite
- The Spirit of Aikido
- The Textbook of Modern Karate
- There Was a Knock

=== 1985 ===
- The Haiku Handbook
- Leda: The Fantastic Adventure of Yohko
- Man'yōshū Jiten
- Murder affair of the Yoshitsune's Buried Treasure Legend
- Nyokan Tūkai
- Three Sisters Investigate

=== 1986 ===
- Bico's
- The Capricious Robot
- Japanese Castles

=== 1987 ===
- 69
- Bedtime Tales
- Koi o Kazoete
- Miracle Ropitt: 2100-Nen no Daibōken
- Norwegian Wood
- Super Boy Allan

=== 1988 ===
- Gambler Jiko Chuushinha
- Hiking in Japan: An Adventurer's Guide to the Mountain Trails
- Hoshin Engi
- Inside the Robot Kingdom
- Karate-Do Nyumon: The Master Introductory Text
- Make Your Own Japanese Clothes: Patterns and Ideas for Modern Wear
- Onna ni tsuite
- A Reader's Guide to Japanese Literature
- Toyota - Fifty Years in Motion
- Visions of the Tranquility of Mount Huangshan

=== 1989 ===
- Akuryō Series
- The Bag of Surprises
- Can't Sleep on Birthday Eve
- Cosmic Epsilon
- Evil Spirits Aren't Scary
- Evil Spirit Series
- Introducing Kyoto
- The Japanese Negotiator: Subtlety and Strategy Beyond Western Logic
- Jesus: Kyōfu no Bio Monster
- Meimon! Tako Nishiouendan
- Mephisto and Waltz!
- Nihongo Daijiten
- Shinobi
- A Stranger in Tibet
- Teke! Teke! Asmik-kun World

== 1990s ==
=== 1990 ===
- Air Diver
- Conquest of the Crystal Palace
- Cutie Suzuki no Ringside Angel
- Deep Dungeon IV: The Black Sorcerer
- F1 Boy
- Gambler Jiko Chuushinha
- Jumpin' Kid: Jack to Mame no Ki Monogatari
- Necros no Yōsai
- Nippon Ichi no Nakantoku
- Power Drift
- Top Players' Tennis

=== 1991 ===
- The Adventures of Star Saver
- Akagawa Jirou no Yuurei Ressha
- Appreciations of Japanese Culture
- Asmik-kun Land
- Asmik-kun World 2
- Blue Almanac
- Confessions of a Yakuza
- D-Force
- Hard-Boiled Wonderland and the End of the World
- Hōtō-ki
- Ippatsu Gyakuten: DX Bakenou
- Megalit
- Mikineko Holmes no Kishi Michi
- Monster Pro Wrestling
- Mysterium
- Ransei no Hasha
- Verytex
- Wurm: Journey to the Center of the Earth
- Yellow Cab: The women who took off at Narita

=== 1992 ===
- "Adult" People
- DX Bakenou Z
- The Great Game
- Lennus: Kodai Kikai no Kioku
- Shanghai III: Dragon's Eye
- Sougou Kakutougi: Astral Bout
- South of the Border, West of the Sun
- Taiko: An Epic Novel of War and Glory in Feudal Japan
- The Twelve Kingdoms
- Winds from Afar
- Working For A Japanese Company: Insights Into The Multicultural Workplace
- Xardion

=== 1993 ===
- 1552: Tenka Tairan
- Aah! Harimanada
- Alien vs. Predator
- Bakenou V3
- CD Battle: Hikari no Yūshatachi
- F-15 Super Strike Eagle
- Fragments of a Past: A Memoir
- Having Our Say: The Delany Sisters' First 100 Years
- A History of the Devil
- Hope Dies Last
- Japan, An Illustrated Encyclopedia
- Kessen! Dokapon Okukoku IV: Densetsu no Yuusha Tachi
- Kishi Densetsu
- Koutetsu no Kishi
- Maten no Sōmetsu
- The Shin Daijiten
- Stepfather Step
- Super Air Diver
- Super Kyousouba: Kaze no Sylphid
- Verve of Mt. Huangshan

=== 1994 ===
- American Night
- Artistic Interpretation of the Huangshan Mountain
- Bakenou TV '94
- Battle Zeque Den
- Big Ichigeki! Pachi-Slot Daikouryaku
- Dance Dance Dance
- Derby Jockey: Kishu Ou heno Michi
- Dokapon 3-2-1: Arashi wo Yobu Yujo
- Ghost Hunt
- Koutetsu no Kishi 2: Sabaku no Rommel Shougun
- Lean and Clean Management: How to Boost Profits and Productivity by Reducing Pollution
- Like hidden fire. The Plot to bring down the British Empire
- Man Meets Dog
- The Memory Police
- On Familiar Terms: A Journey Across Cultures
- Once and Forever: The Tales of Kenji Miyazawa
- Pretty Soldier Sailor Moon Original Picture Collection vol. I
- Pretty Soldier Sailor Moon Volume II Original Picture Collection
- Sons of the Yellow Emperor: A History of the Chinese Diaspora
- Sougou Kakutougi: Astral Bout 2 - The Total Fighters
- The Summer of the Ubume
- Women who slept with the bubble
- Zen in America: Profiles of Five Teachers

=== 1995 ===
- 17 Springs Passed
- The ABC Wars
- A Cruel Angel's Thesis
- Ghost in the Shell: Burning City
- Gon, the Little Fox
- Idol Mahjong Final Romance 2
- Mōryō no Hako
- Mrs. Ohnishi's Whale Cuisine
- The National Parks of Japan
- Sougou Kakutougi Rings: Astral Bout 3
- Trespassers on the Roof of the World: The Secret Exploration of Tibet

=== 1996 ===
- All She Was Worth
- Big Ichigeki! Pachi-Slot Daikouryaku: Universal Museum
- Enhance Your Garden with Japanese Plants
- Fishing Koushien
- The Haiku Seasons: Poetry of the Natural World
- Haiku World: An International Poetry Almanac\
- Idol Mahjong Final Romance R
- The Narrow Road to Oku
- On Familiar Terms: To Japan and Back, a Lifetime Across Cultures
- One Life: The Autobiography of an African American Actress
- Philosophy for Kids!
- Pretty Soldier Sailor Moon Volume III Original Picture Collection
- Pretty Soldier Sailor Moon Volume IV Original Picture Collection
- Reading The Japanese Mind: The Realities Behind Their Thoughts and Actions
- Sakuraba Atsuko: Kakeru kita Megami
- Syusse Mahjong Daisettai
- Yanoáma: the story of Helena Valero, a girl kidnapped by Amazonian Indians
- Yume de Ippai

=== 1997 ===
- Analysis of Ghost in the Shell
- Asuka 120% Limited BURNING Fest
- Bakuretsu Hunter R
- in the room
- The Evening Party at the Princess's House
- Home, Green Home
- Kendo The definitive guide
- Niagara: A History of the Falls. New York
- Pretty Soldier Sailor Moon Volume V Original Picture Collection
- The Roads to Sata
- Rondo-Revolution
- A Lost Paradise
- Ukiyo-e: An Introduction to Japanese Woodblock Prints
- Underground
- Voice Fantasia S: Ushinawareta Voice Power

=== 1998 ===
- The connoisseur's book of Japanese swords
- The garden as architecture : form and spirit in the gardens of Japan, China, and Korea
- Ghost in the Shell 2: Star Seed
- Initial D Gaiden
- Kurashi no kotoba: Gogen Jiten
- Mario Mushano no Chou-Shogi-Juku
- One Hundred Sacks of Rice: A Stage Play
- The Scents of Eden: A History of the Spice Trade
- Shura no Mon
- Tsun Tsun Kumi: Suuji de Puni Puni
- Tsun Tsun Kumi 2: Moji Moji Pakkun
- Yakushiji Ryōko no Kaiki Jikenbo

=== 1999 ===
- Initial D
- Initial D: Koudou Saisoku Densetsu
- Kiganjo
- Kindaichi Shounen no Jikenbo 3: Shouryuu Densetsu Satsujin Jiken
- Kodansha Kanji Learner's Dictionary
- Living in Two Countries
- Mizuki Shigeru no Youkai Zukan Soushuuhen
- Pikupiku Sentarou
- Prety Soldier Sailor Moon Materials Collection
- Psychometrer Eiji
- Sougaku Toshi Osaka
- South Africa: A Narrative History
- Sputnik Sweetheart
- Super Bass Fishing
- This Cruel World
- Tsun Tsun Kumi 3: Kanjivader

== 2000s ==
=== 2000 ===
- Bonkura
- The Colors of Japan
- Dejiko no Mahjong Party
- Dive!!
- Go
- Jiken
- Jump
- Mizutamari ni Utsuru Sekai
- Tobaku Mokushiroku Kaiji
- Traditional Japanese Music and Musical Instruments
- Tsutsui-ban akuma no jiten
- Utamaro: Portraits from the Floating World

=== 2001 ===
- Cat Soup
- Dai Tsui Seki-Einstein No Tensai No
- Drunk as a Lord
- A Hundred Years of Japanese Film: A Concise History
- Kagami family series
- Karate Jutsu: The Original Teachings of Master Funakoshi
- Kuroneko to Tsuki Kikyū o Meguru Bōken
- Naniwa Kinyuu Michi
- Shaman King
- Spain no Ame
- The Tale of Genji

=== 2002 ===
- China Impact
- Christmas Terror—Invisible/Inventor
- Dead or Alive 3 Kōshiki Kōryaku Guide
- The fine art of Japanese food arrangement
- Giants of Japan: The Lives of Japan's Most Influential Men and Women
- A Haiku Journey: Bashō's Narrow Road to a Far Province
- Horie Yui no Tenshi no Tamago
- Japan's Longest Day
- Modern Japanese Swords and Swordsmiths: From 1866 to the Present
- The New Generation of Japanese Swordsmiths
- Riding the East Wind: A Novel of War and Peace
- Tsutsui-ban akuma no jiten : kanzen hochū
- Zaregoto

=== 2003 ===
- Basic Wakiya-style Chinese You Can Make in a Frying Pan
- Classical Weaponry of Japan: Special Weapons and Tactics of the Martial Arts
- Discovering the Arts of Japan, A Historical Overview
- Edo no hatamoto jiten
- Guin Saga
- Ho?: Horie Yui Character Best Album
- How to make The Character Novels
- Kura no Kami
- No. 6
- Okko's Inn
- Ring
- Samurai Fighting Arts: The Spirit and the Practice
- Sekai
- Shin Honkaku Mahō Shōjo Risuka
- Sky

=== 2004 ===
- After Dark
- Alive & Kicking
- Ashita no Kioku
- Children Killed by Information Technology: Spreading Game Brain
- Clamp no Kiseki
- The Canon of Judo
- Dark Water
- The Garden of Sinners
- A Guide to the Japanese Stage.
- Innocent Starter
- The Intellectual History of Otaku ―― 1980's Theory
- The Japan Book: A Comprehensive Pocket Guide
- Ico
- The Lone Samurai
- Magical Girl Lyrical Nanoha Sound Stage 01
- Mottainai Bāsan
- Rakuen
- Spiral
- Ningen

=== 2005 ===
- Chūsei Toshi Kamakura: Iseki ga Kataru Bushi no Miyako
- Eternal Blaze
- Floating Yesterday
- Grand Finale
- Higurashi
- A Hundred Years of Japanese Film: A Concise History, with a Selective Guide to DVDs and Videos
- Kuromajo-san ga Toru!!
- Magical Girl Lyrical Nanoha A's Sound Stage 01
- Magical Girl Lyrical Nanoha Original Soundtrack
- Magical Girl Lyrical Nanoha Sound Stage 02
- Magical Girl Lyrical Nanoha Sound Stage 03
- Monogatari
- Parasite Eve
- The Secret Techniques of Bonsai
- Shadow Family
- Spiritual Garden
- Usotsuki Alice to Kujiragō o Meguru Bōken

=== 2006 ===
- Adventures in the Japanese Bath
- The Beast Player
- Birthday
- The Book of Sake: A Connoisseurs Guide
- The Crimson Labyrinth
- Crossfire
- The Demon's Sermon on the Martial Arts
- The Flowering Spirit: Classic Teachings on the Art of No
- The Hunter
- Loving the Machine: The Art and Science of Japanese Robots
- Magical Girl Lyrical Nanoha A's original soundtracks
- Magical Girl Lyrical Nanoha A's Sound Stage 02
- Magical Girl Lyrical Nanoha A's Sound Stage 03
- Magical Girl Lyrical Nanoha A's Sound Stage Vocal Best Collection
- Plastic Culture: How Japanese Toys Conquered the World
- Plastic Soul
- Super Generation

=== 2007 ===
- Ari no susabi
- Beautiful Amulet
- The Devil's Whisper
- Gōin ni Mai Yeah
- Gray-Colored Diet Coke
- The Guin Saga Manga: The Seven Magi
- Higurashi When They Cry
- History of the University of Tokyo: Forerunner of the University System
- Hito Toshite Jiku ga Bureteiru
- Hoshizora no Spica
- Japanese Cooking: A Simple Art
- Kanojo ni Tsuite Shiru koto no Subete
- Katanagatari
- Magical Girl Lyrical Nanoha StrikerS Sound Stage 01
- Massive Wonders
- My Ego Ratio, My Teeth, and the World
- Otome wa Boku ni Koishiteru
- Sayonara, Zetsubou-Sensei Character Song Album
- Sayonara, Zetsubou-Sensei Original Soundtrack
- Secret Ambition
- Toward the Terra
- Zessei Bijin

=== 2008 ===
- Arcade Mania! The Turbo-Charged World of Japan's Games Centers
- Chotto Nani Kai ten no ka wakan naidesu……!!
- Darling
- Genshiken: Return of the Otaku
- Haute Chinese Cuisine from the Kitchen of Wakiya
- Kitchen Princess: Search for the Angel Cake
- Kūsō Rumba
- Megumi Ohori×Mōsatsu Amai Kokansetsu
- Research on the Sōkagakkai
- Sayonara, Zetsubou-Sensei Best Album: Zetsubō Daisakkai
- Yokai Attack! : the Japanese Monster Survival Guide
- Yōkaiden
- Zoku Sayonara, Zetsubou-Sensei Original Soundtrack

=== 2009 ===
- Buta o Nusumu
- Death by Water
- Heaven
- Honey Jet
- Magical Girl Lyrical Nanoha StrikerS Sound Stage Vocal Best Collection
- Megatokyo
- Minoue Banashi
- The Otaku Encyclopedia
- Railways of Japan - Tokaido Line - Lines/Stations/Track plans - Vol 11 South-east Tokyo and North-west Chiba
- Ringo Mogire Beam!
- The Sleeping Dragon
- Wolverine: Prodigal Son
- X-Men Misfits
- Yojokun: Life Lessons from a Samurai
- Zan Sayonara, Zetsubou-Sensei Character Song
- Zan Sayonara, Zetsubou-Sensei Original Soundtrack

== 2010s ==
=== 2010 ===
- Bushido, The Soul of Japan
- The Essence of Karate
- King of RPGs
- Kogure shashinkan
- Kyokugen Dasshutsu 9 Jikan 9 Nin 9 no Tobira Alterna
- Nihon jinmei daijiten
- Nintendo Magic: Winning the Videogame Wars
- Pistols
- Perfect Guide Book of the Japanese Riot Police
- Shuchō Panchi: Sainenshō Shichō GABBA Funsenki
- Twin Spica
- Yosuga no Sora

=== 2011 ===
- All the Lovers in the Night
- Aruvu Rezuru: Kikaijikake no Yōseitachi
- Attack on Titan: Before the Fall
- Dance Hall
- The Kouga Ninja Scrolls
- Lychee Light Club
- Nihon jinmei daijiten+Plus
- No Longer Human
- Ojamajo Doremi
- Tantei Team KZ Jiken Note
- Velveteen & Mandala

=== 2012 ===
- Best Album
- Devil Survivor 2 The Animation: Cetus's Prequel
- The Essence of Shinto: Japan's Spiritual Heart
- Heroman
- Himitsu
- Listen to Me, Girls. I Am Your Father!
- Magical Girl Lyrical Nanoha The Movie 2nd A's Original Soundtrack
- Ninjin Club
- Nocturne for the Starry Sky
- Paradise Kiss
- Queen's Blade: Perfect Visual Book
- Unknown Arve: Kindan no Yōseitachi

=== 2013 ===
- Clockwork Planet
- Dreams of Love, etc.
- Helter Skelter
- Kurage no Shokudō
- Mobile Suit Gundam: The Origin
- Sickness Unto Death
- Summer Wars

=== 2014 ===
- Attack on Titan: Harsh Mistress of the City
- Attack on Titan: Lost Girls
- Brainwash ~Comeback from 12 Years of Hell~
- Cardfight!! Vanguard
- How Not to Summon a Demon Lord
- In Clothes Called Fat
- Prophecy
- ~Umaretate no Watashi~ Tomohide Monogatari Jiyoung Story

=== 2015 ===
- Babylon
- Hajime Syacho Photo Book
- Nihon Jinmei Daijiten Plus
- Nihon no Rock Meiban Best 100
- Ninja Slayer
- Pretty Boy Detective Club
- Rune Naito Artbox: The Roots of Kawaii
- Tokyo ESP#Manga
- World End no Niwa

=== 2016 ===
- A Girl on the Shore
- Hajime Syacho Photo Book -Sotsugyō-
- Immortal Hounds
- Nichijou
- Tomonaga Mio First Photobook "Hinata"
- Yagi Magazine

=== 2017 ===
- Arakawa Under the Bridge
- Boarding School Juliet
- Burn the House Down
- Crystal
- Go! Princess PreCure the Book: Hana and Refi's Adventure
- Middle-Aged Businessman, Arise in Another World!
- Mobile Suit Gundam Wing Endless Waltz: Glory of the Losers
- My Unique Skill Makes Me OP Even at Level 1

=== 2018 ===
- Am I Actually the Strongest?
- Against decriminalization: The perspectives on humanity in the early Buddhism and the Lotus sutra.
- Azur Lane: Starting My Life as a Commander with Laffey
- A Girl & Her Guard Dog
- Pop Team Epic

=== 2019 ===
- Bungaku Shojo no Kashu
- Raging Loop
- This Is Screwed Up, but I Was Reincarnated as a Girl in Another World!

== 2020s ==
=== 2020 ===
- I Was Reincarnated as the 7th Prince so I Can Take My Time Perfecting My Magical Ability

== Unsorted ==
- Altered Beast
- Ben 10: Alien Force: Doom Dimension
- Blueprint for a New Japan: The Rethinking of a Nation
- The Craft of the Japanese Sword
- Daily Lives of High School Boys
- DuckTales
- Eiji Yoshikawa's Historical Fiction in Paperback
- Elfin Paradise
- Turkestan Reunion

== See also ==
- List of manga published by Kodansha
- List of works published by Ichijinsha
