= Tominari =

Tominari (written: 冨成) is a Japanese surname. Notable people with the surname include:

- Shinji Tominari (冨成 慎司, born 1987), Japanese footballer
- Tadao Tominari (冨成 忠夫, 1919–1992), Japanese photographer

== See also ==
- 13582 Tominari, a main-belt minor planet
