= On Top and Beneath Ryōgoku Bridge =

Woodblock prints by Kitagawa Utamaro

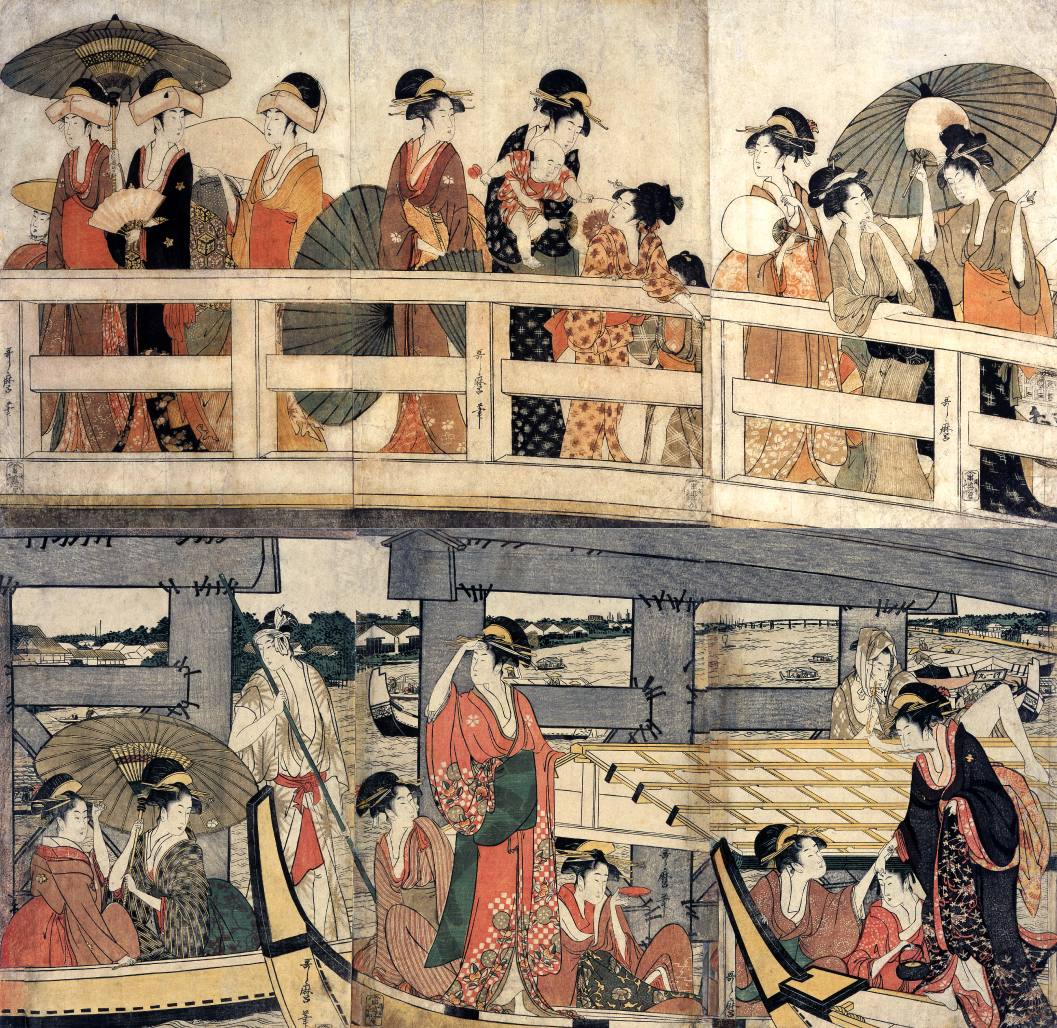
On Top and Beneath Ryōgoku Bridge, Utamaro, multicolour woodblock print on handmade washi paper, c. 1795–96, 75 by 60 centimetres (30 in × 24 in)

On Top and Beneath Ryōgoku Bridge (両国橋上下 Ryōgoku-bashi ue-shita) is a picture made up of six prints designed by the Japanese ukiyo-e artist Utamaro and published in c. 1795–96. The scene depicts numerous people—mainly elegantly dressed women of various social classes—on outings at Ryōgoku Bridge over the Sumida River in Edo (modern Tokyo). At about 75 by 60 centimetres (30 in × 24 in), the assembled set is the earliest known ukiyo-e picture of such an extravagant size.

== Background ==
Ukiyo-e art flourished in Japan during the Edo period from the 17th to 19th centuries, and took as its primary subjects courtesans, kabuki actors, and others associated with the "floating world" lifestyle of the pleasure districts. Alongside paintings, mass-produced woodblock prints were a major form of the genre. In the mid-18th century full-colour nishiki-e prints became common, printed using a large number of woodblocks, one for each colour. A prominent genre was bijin-ga ("pictures of beauties"), which depicted most often courtesans and geisha at leisure, and promoted the entertainments of the pleasure districts.

Kitagawa Utamaro (c. 1753–1806) made his name in the 1790s with his bijin ōkubi-e ("large-headed pictures of beautiful women") portraits, focusing on the head and upper torso, a style others had previously employed in portraits of kabuki actors. Utamaro experimented with line, colour, and printing techniques to bring out subtle differences in the features, expressions, and backdrops of subjects from a wide variety of class and background. Utamaro's individuated beauties were in sharp contrast to the stereotyped, idealized images that had been the norm.

The Sumida River flowed through eastern Edo (modern Tokyo). Ryōgoku Bridge was the largest bridge over the river in this heavily populated and thriving urban centre. Its name translates as "bridge of the two provinces", as it was built to connect the provinces of Musashi Province, in which Edo lay, and Shimōsa.

== Publication ==
The prints bear no title, and different titles are given in different sources in both Japanese and English. The set was published in c. 1795–96 by Ōmiya Gonkurō, (Note: On the Japanese calendar, the print appeared in c. Kansei 7 or 8.) whose seal (近江屋権九郎) appears on each print. Each bears the signature Utamaro hitsu (歌麿筆, "The brush of Utamaro").

Copies of the set or members of it are in the collections of the British Museum, the Guimet Museum, the Museum of Fine Arts, Boston, the Art Institute of Chicago, the Metropolitan Museum of Art, and the Tokyo National Museum.

== Description ==
The picture is made up of six prints arranged in two tiers of three. Each is a vertical, multicoloured nishiki-e "brocade print" in ōban size—about 25 by 30 centimetres (10 in × 12 in) per print. There is no known earlier example of such an extravagantly large print. The prints were designed so that each could also stand alone.

The print features a large number of people on outings by the busy Ryōgoku Bridge over the Sumida River. Nearly all the figures are women. The view faces downstream, and boathouses line the river in the background.

Nine elegantly-dressed tall women stand or lean on the bridge, watching the river flow beneath. Some hold hand fans or parasols, suggesting a hot summer scene. The women come from different social rankings. From details such as the hairstyles some of the women are recognizable as geishas. The women in the upper left are women-in-waiting from a feudal lord's palace, and are wearing age-bōshi (Note: 揚帽子 age-bōshi) head-dresses, which were popular during Japan's Edo period. A woman holding a child stands at the centre, and to the right is a group of entertainers. Behind the woman furthest to the right holding a round hand fan can be seen a water-seller's equipment; fresh water was scarce in the area, as it was made from reclaimed land by the ocean. Such merchants sold slightly sweetened water from distant springs.

Below the bridge various parties enjoy boating. A group appear to be having a drinking party on a canopied boat in the centre and right foreground. A geisha wearing a kimono adorned with her family crest is crossing onto this boat from another at the far right. A pair of geisha in a small choki-bune (Note: 猪牙舟 choki-bune) punt at the far left appear to be about to be called to join this party as well; they shade themselves with an open parasol. Amongst the women are two handsome young men, one guiding the choki-bune to the left with a pole, and another lazing atop the covered boat to the right, pipe in hand.

On Top and Beneath Ryōgoku Bridge

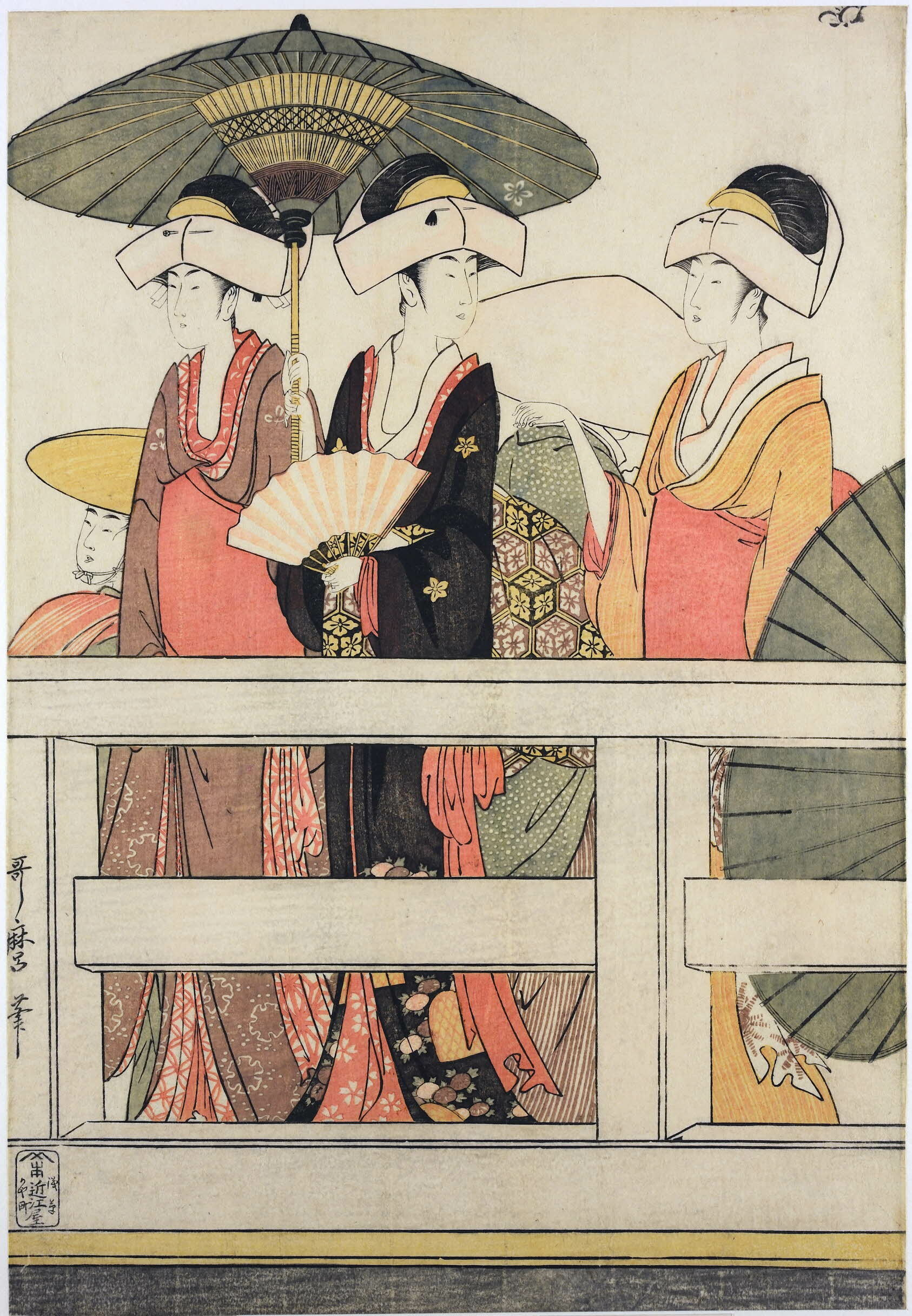

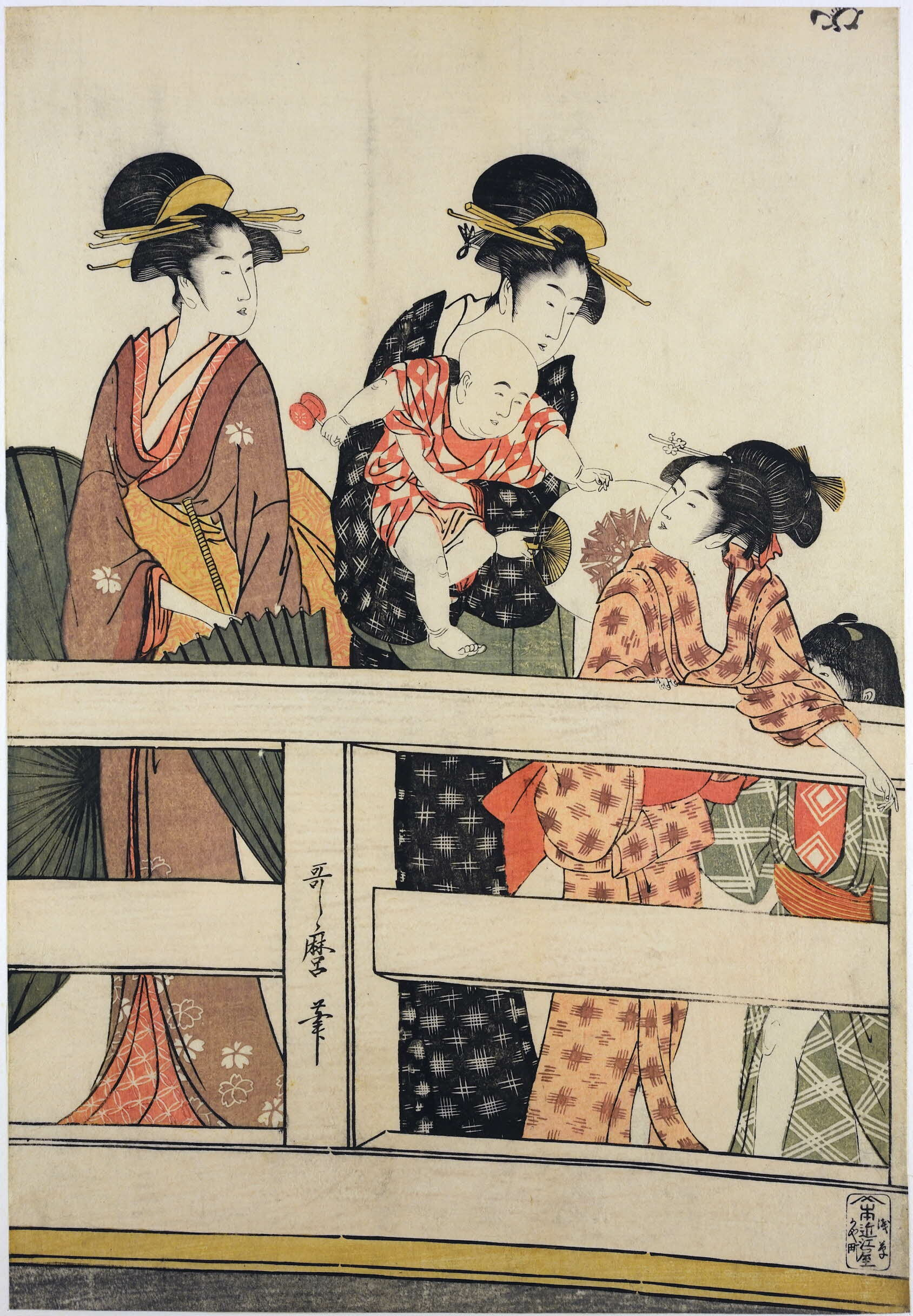

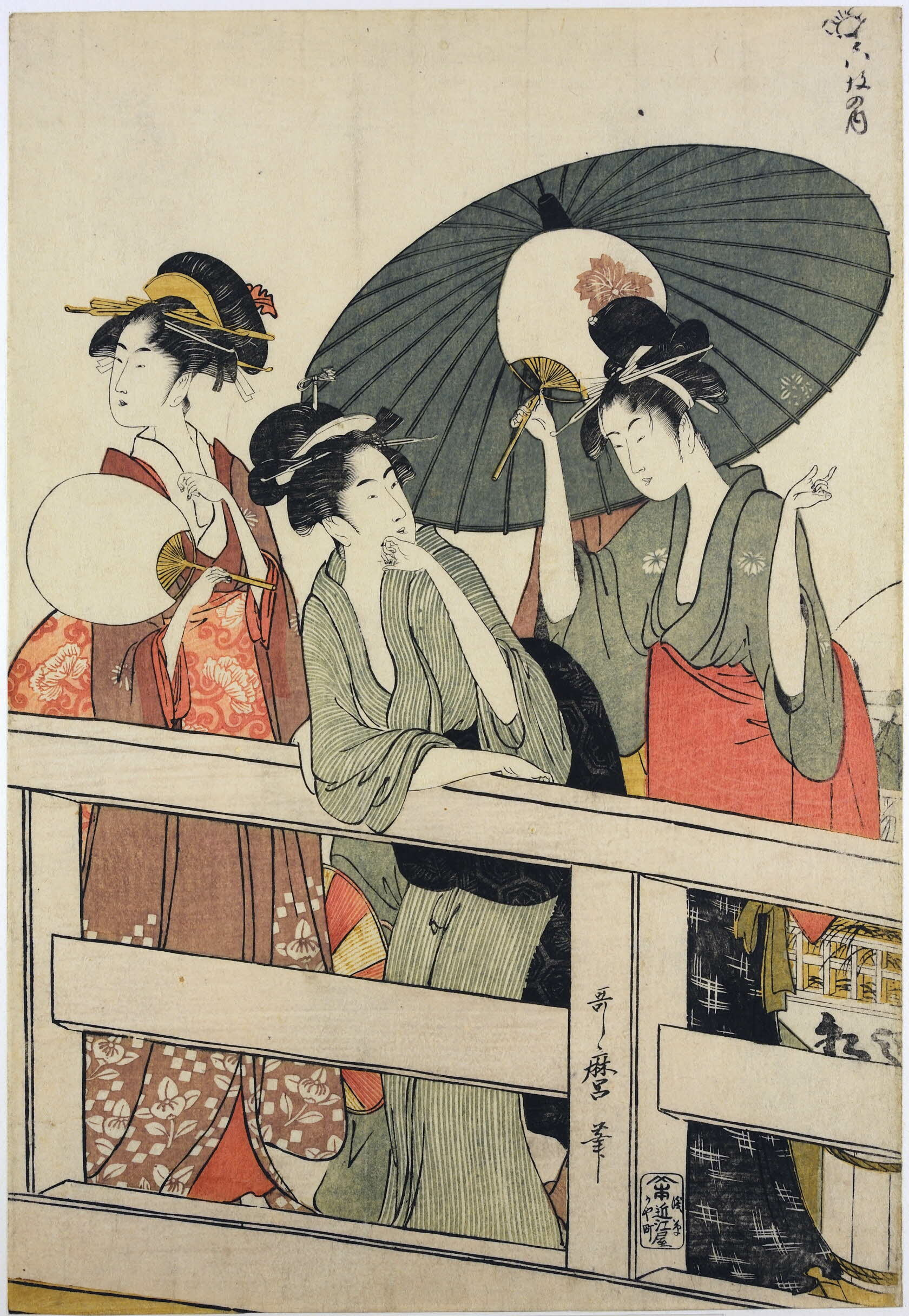
