= Aruvu Rezuru: Kikaijikake no Yōseitachi =

Japanese light novel series

- Cover of the light novel

アルヴ・レズル -機械仕掛けの妖精たち-
- Genre: Science fiction
- Light novel
- Written by: Yū Yamaguchi
- Illustrated by: Ayaki
- Published by: Kodansha
- Magazine: BOX-AiR
- Original run: September 1, 2011 – April 1, 2012
- Volumes: 1
- Light novel

Unknown Arve: Kindan no Yōseitachi
- Written by: Yū Yamaguchi
- Illustrated by: Ayaki
- Magazine: BOX-AiR
- Original run: October 1, 2012 – March 1, 2013
- Volumes: 1
- Manga
- Written by: Yū Yamaguchi
- Illustrated by: Ayaki
- Magazine: Nico Nico Seiga
- Original run: December 26, 2012 – March 1, 2013
- Volumes: 1
- Anime film
- Directed by: Tatsuya Yoshihara
- Written by: Yū Yamaguchi
- Studio: Zexcs
- Released: March 2, 2013
- Runtime: 25 minutes

Aruvu Rezuru: Kikaijikake no Yōseitachi (アルヴ・レズル -機械仕掛けの妖精たち-; lit. 'Arve Rezzle: Mechanized Fairies') is a Japanese science fiction light novel series by Yū Yamaguchi that began serialization in 2011. It is released through the electronic magazine BOX-AiR, an imprint run by Kodansha Box. In December 2011, it was selected out of 11 winners of the New Author Awards to become the first BOX-AiR series to be animated. A short film adaptation (part of Anime Mirai 2013) by Zexcs debuted on March 2, 2013, directed by newcomer Tatsuya Yoshihara, who was previously an episode director for Sket Dance.

== Plot ==
Set in 2022, technology has advanced to the point where the human nervous system can be seamlessly integrated into external networks thanks to nanomachines. People leave their bodies behind in water tanks while traversing through cyberspace. However, a crisis known as "Early Rapture" occurs where the system becomes overloaded, resulting in thousands of consciousnesses being lost in the network. Remu Mikage's sister Shiki is one of them, and in an attempt to look for her he visits her apartment. He encounters Shiki there, who informs him that the person he is speaking to isn't his sister, and has somehow taken over her body.

== Characters ==
Remu Mikage (御影 礼望, Mikage Remu)
Voiced by: Jun Fukuyama
Shiki Mikage (御影 詩希, Mikage Shiki)
Voiced by: Eri Kitamura
