= Miracle Ropitt: 2100-Nen no Daibōken =

1987 video game

- Cover art
- Developer: Micronics
- Publisher: King Records
- Composers: Michio Fujisawa; Yasunori Shiono
- Platform: Family Computer
- Release: JP: August 7, 1987
- Genre: Action
- Modes: Single-player, multiplayer

Miracle Ropitt: 2100-Nen no Daibōken (Note: Japanese: ミラクルロピット 〜2100年の大冒険〜), also called Miracle Ropit's Adventure in 2100 on its title screen, is a Family Computer video game that was released in 1987 exclusively for the Japanese market. The Adventures of Star Saver, also known as Rubble Saver, is a related quasi-sequel for Game Boy.

== Gameplay ==
Sample gameplay of Miracle Ropitt: 2100-Nen no Daibōken.

The game must be played through twice in order to see the true ending, just like in Ghosts 'n Goblins.

A girl in the year 2100 uses a robot suit. If the player is hit once, then the suit is lost and the player must play as the little girl. One more hit and the player loses a life. Although the game was only released in Japan, the game's text is in English and is completely playable by English speakers.
