= Astral Bout =

- Genre: Fighting
- Developer: A-Wave
- Publisher: King Records
- Platform: Super Famicom
- First release: Sougou Kakutougi: Astral Bout; 1992
- Latest release: Sougou Kakutougi Rings: Astral Bout 3

== Sougou Kakutougi: Astral Bout ==
Sougou Kakutougi: Astral Bout
- Cover art
- Developer: A-Wave
- Publisher: King Records
- Composers: Takuo Uchida; Yukiyoshi Hujimoto; Jun Ōtsuki
- Platform: Super Famicom
- Release: JP: June 26, 1992
- Genres: Sports, fighting
- Modes: Single-player, multiplayer

Sougou Kakutougi: Astral Bout (アストラル バウト 総合格闘技) is a Super Famicom video game based on various forms of fighting styles found in the Japanese combat sport promotion Fighting Network Rings.

=== Gameplay ===
Applying a devastating move to the opponent.

This video game was the predecessor to mixed martial arts promotion companies and pay-per-view tournaments like the Ultimate Fighting Championship that are popular with today's young people.

There are nine different styles of fighting to adopt: professional wrestling, boxing, karate, sambo, muay thai, kung-fu, judo, kickboxing and lucha libre, and the basic set of martial arts. Like in an arcade fighting game, each player has a limited amount of continues that eventually lead to a "game over" if they all are allowed to expire. Three different modes to this game; standard one-player, two-player, or a "player vs. CPU" sparring session. All competitors have health meters that are divided into three between rounds to keep track of the strength in the arms, legs, and the rest of the body. The difficulty level can be set for either low, medium, or high.

Rope breaks are possible to pull off; like in professional wrestling. However, all matches end in a 10-count fall instead of pinning the opponent for a 3-count. There are a certain number of rounds with a pre-determined time limit (ranging from one-minute fights to endurance events).

=== Fighters ===
There are nine fighters in the game with different fighting styles:

- Barnov Gainer, a sambo grappler from Georgian Republic
- Changpuek Kiatsongrit, a Muay Thai fighter from Thailand
- Akira Maeda, a professional wrestler from Japan
- Masaaki Satake, a karate expert from Japan
- Shiro Kimura, a judo expert from Japan
- Mike Tyson, a heavyweight boxing champion from America
- Lü Zijian, a kung-fu master from China
- Joe Lewis (martial artist), a kickboxing champion from America
- Spell Falcon, a Lucha Libre star from Unknown

== Sougou Kakutougi Rings: Astral Bout 3 ==
=== Reception ===
On release, Famicom Tsūshin scored the game a 21 out of 40.
