= List of Otome wa Boku ni Koishiteru episodes =

DVD limited edition volume one.

The Otome wa Boku ni Koishiteru animated television series is based on the visual novel Otome wa Boku ni Koishiteru by the Japanese software company Caramel Box. The episodes, produced by the animation studio Feel, are directed by Munenori Nawa, written by Katsumi Hasegawa, and features character design by Noriko Shimazawa who based the designs on Norita's original concept. The story follows the main character Mizuho Miyanokouji, a male high school student who transfers into an all-girls school, and how he lives his life interacting with many girls who do not know he is actually a boy.

Twelve episodes were produced by Feel and aired in Japan between October 6 and December 24, 2006, on several networks including TV Kanagawa and Chiba TV. The episodes were released on four DVD compilations released in limited and regular editions containing four episodes for the first DVD, and three for the subsequent releases. The limited releases were between January 11 and April 4, 2007, and the regular releases were between May 9 and August 8, 2007. A single original video animation episodes was released on the final limited edition DVD. The cover art from the limited edition DVDs features art from the original visual novel. Media Blasters released the series, including the OVA, as English-subtitled DVDs between June 24 and October 7, 2008, under the title Otoboku: Maidens Are Falling For Me!.

Two pieces of theme music are used for the episodes; one opening theme and one ending theme. The opening theme is "Love Power" by Aice^{5}, and the ending theme is "Beautiful Day" by Yui Sakakibara. The insert song "Again" by Sakakibara was used in episode eleven.

== Anime television series ==
No.	Title	Original release date
1	"The Prince with Lipstick"; Transliteration: "Rūju o Hiita Ōji-sama" (Japanese: 口紅(ルージュ)をひいた王子様)	October 8, 2006
Mizuho, despite being male, is transferred to an all-girls school where he must crossdress in order to attend. Upon arrival, he quickly becomes popular among the other students.
2	"The Eraser That Doesn't Erase"; Transliteration: "Kesenai Keshigomu" (Japanese: けせない消しゴム)	October 15, 2006
Shion Jujo is introduced and befriends Mizuho. Shion quickly realizes Mizuho is male, but doesn't seem to care. Mizuho learns of the Elder system, where a model student is chosen by students and of Shion's connection with it.
3	"When Maidens Choose a Maiden"; Transliteration: "Otome ga Otome o Erabu Toki" (Japanese: おとめが乙女を選ぶ時)	October 22, 2006
Mizuho finds out he is in the same world history class with Takako, where they talk and she says that she won't agree to her becoming elder, not knowing that he's a boy. Mizuho is elected elder and Shion collapses after defending the election, making Mizuho rush her to the infirmary.
4	"Sleeping Beauty Behind the Door That Won't Open"; Transliteration: "Akazu no Tobira no Nemuri-hime" (Japanese: 開かずの扉の眠り姫)	October 29, 2006
After the girls (and Mizuho) did a "scary stories night", the story of the ghost that has been living in one of the dorm's rooms - Mizuho's - is revealed. Takashima Ichiko is awakened and introduced.
5	"The Midnight Chapel"; Transliteration: "Mayonaka no Chaperu" (Japanese: 真夜中の教会(チャペル))	November 5, 2006
Continuing from last episode, Mizuho introduces Ichiko to the dorm girls. Mizuho learns of Ichiko's past, that Ichiko's elder friend is his own mother. After Ichiko had cleared her conscience, Mizuho thought that Ichiko had passed on only to later discover she is back at the dorm and is there to stay.
6	"Capriccio of a Summer's Day"; Transliteration: "Natsu no Hi no Kapurittsio" (Japanese: 夏の日の狂想曲(カプリッツィオ))	November 12, 2006
As the summer vacation draws closer, the students begin swimming for physical education, though Mizuho has to fake being on a menstrual cycle to get out of it. When Takako notices him skipping out on swimming, she has the false pretense that Mizuho can't swim though is told yet another lie that Mizuho is afraid of water. Mariya and Takako get in a fight afterwards and end up in a swimming contest as many other students watch and cheer on.
7	"Little Kana and a Big Ribbon"; Transliteration: "Chitchana Kana to Ōkina Ribon" (Japanese: 小っちゃな妹(かな)と大きなリボン)	November 19, 2006
When Takako tells Kana to remove the ribbon in her hair during school, Mizuho, Mariya and Shion challenge the student council president's opinion in front of the entire school.
8	"Time That Won't Shrink"; Transliteration: "Chijimaranai Taimu" (Japanese: 縮まらない記録(タイム))	November 26, 2006
Yukari starts to lose confidence in herself when it comes to her activity in the Track and Field club while everyone else around her are working so hard. What will it take for her to regain it?
9	"Mariya in Love"; Transliteration: "Mariya no Kimochi" (Japanese: まりやの気持ち)	December 3, 2006
After witnessing how mature Mizuho has grown recently, Mariya is unsure on how to act towards him and starts to avoid him. Mariya also starts to take notice of her feelings towards Mizuho.
10	"The Two Juliets"; Transliteration: "Futari no Jurietto" (Japanese: 二人のジュリエット)	December 10, 2006
The school festival has finally begun and all the students are working hard at their respective exhibits. Now's the moment that everyone's been waiting for: the play Romeo and Juliet starring Mizuho and Takako.
11	"An Etude of Confusion"; Transliteration: "Tomadoi no Echūdo" (Japanese: 戸惑いの練習曲(エチュード))	December 17, 2006
Mariya has come down with a cold while still trying to battle with her feelings for Mizuho. After she recovers, what will happen when they go out on a date together?
12	"The Last Dance Forever"; Transliteration: "Rasuto Dansu wa Eien ni" (Japanese: ラストダンスは永遠に)	December 24, 2006
After learning that Mizuho is in fact male, Takako starts to avoid him at school. The rest of the students notice the change in her, and in Mizuho's personality. However, the dance party is still coming up and Mizuho has resigned to fulfill his Elder duties and be there. Takako has some misgivings about going, but after a talk by Mariya, she attends and is even able to share the last dance with Mizuho. In the credits, the main characters are shown enjoying themselves over the rest of the remaining school year.

== OVA ==
No.	Title	Original release date
13	"Young Adult's Forest of World Masterpieces ~Tsunderella~"; Transliteration: "Ōkina Shōnen Shōjo Sekai Meisaku no Mori ~Tsunderera~" (Japanese: 大きな少年少女世界名作の森~ツンデレラ~)	April 4, 2007
Long ago, there was a girl named Tsunderella (a play on the Japanese word tsundere which applies to Takako's personality). Her stepmother and sister-in-law were hard on her. This episode is a parody of Cinderella along with cameos of Snow White, and Little Red Riding Hood contained in the last DVD, volume four.

== See also ==
- List of anime based on video games
