= The Adventures of Star Saver =

1991 video game

- North American cover art
- Developer: A-Wave
- Publishers: JP: King Records; NA/EU: Taito
- Platform: Game Boy
- Release: JP: May 17, 1991; EU: 1992; NA: March 1992
- Genre: Platform
- Mode: Single-player

The Adventures of Star Saver, known in Japan as Rubble Saver (ラブルセイバー), is a 2D platform game for the Game Boy. It is a quasi-sequel to the earlier Miracle Ropitt for Famicom.

== Summary ==
The player is standing on a platform that looks like Saturn.

A boy named Kevin and his sister Connie are forced to go inside an unidentified flying object by a group of aliens who are planning to invade the galaxy. They are later exiled to a distant planet after refusing to engage in espionage for their side.

Kevin finds himself stranded on a strange planet where nothing is familiar (and without his sister). However, a mech called Tom Wolf that has a vast knowledge of telepathic skills saves him and empowers Kevin with the ability to take on the aliens' army. This machine becomes an important ally in the battle to save Connie and stop the extraterrestrial invasion before it's too late. The game forces players to fight strange aliens across the galaxy. Various power-ups can be collected to add to the mech's abilities. However, the mech is lost after a single hit. The game includes some surreal enemies like a domestic dog and musical notes.

In the Japanese version, the plot is slightly different. Here, the player instead takes control of the sister who has to rescue her brother from the aliens.

== Legacy ==
In 1992, Rubble Saver II was released in Japan. In Europe it was published by Infogrames as Max.
