= The Strange Library =

Children's novel by Haruki Murakami

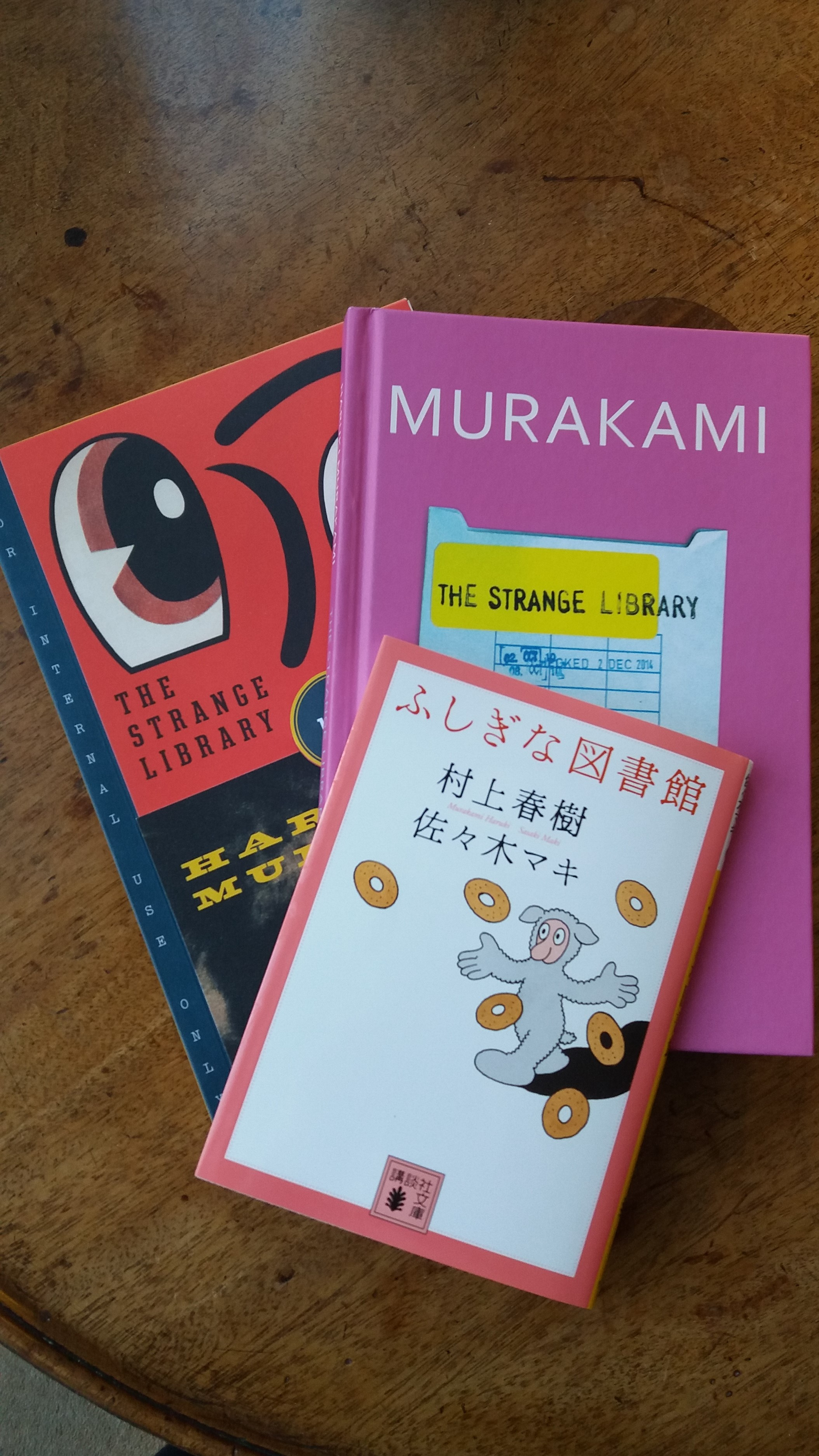
Showing three current editions of Haruki Murakami's story, The Strange Library: (L-R) Knopf, 2014; Harvill Secker, 2014; Kodansha Bunko, 2008 (2017 reprint).

The Strange Library (ふしぎな図書館 fushigi na toshokan) is a novella by Japanese author Haruki Murakami (村上春樹 Murakami Haruki). A version first appeared in 1983. There are several picture books based on this short story, the most recent versions of which were published in 2014.

== Synopsis ==
A boy visits his local library on the way home from school. When he asks to borrow a book, he is directed to Room 107 in the basement where a stern old man confronts him. Fearful, the boy says he is interested in tax collection in the Ottoman Empire and the man goes to fetch three large volumes.

The old man then leads him into a subterranean maze towards the reading room where he will be permitted to read the books. There the boy meets a sheep man, who was ordered by the old man to imprison him in a cell. He is told that he has one month to memorise all three volumes, after which the old man intends to eat his brains once they have become ‘nice and creamy’ with knowledge.

With the help of sheep man and a mysterious voiceless girl, the boy makes a bid for freedom through the maze, but as they enter the library once more, they are confronted by the old man and a large black dog. The boy and sheep man manage to escape to the local park and as the boy rests sheep man disappears. Back home, he finds his mother waiting for him with a hot breakfast. He decides never to visit the library again.

== The Strange Library (2005 and 2008 editions) ==
In February 2005 an illustrated edition of The Strange Library appeared in Japanese (図書館奇譚 toshokankitan, published by Kodansha). This was then republished in January 2008 as a Kodansha Bunko edition. The illustrations are by Maki Sasaki.

== The Strange Library (2014 editions) ==
In November 2014 The Strange Library was published in Japan by Shinchosha with illustrations by Kat Menschik Several editions then appeared in translation, including the ones listed below.

== Editions in Translation ==
Language	Title	Translator	Illustrator	Year	Publisher
German	Die unheimliche Bibliothek	Ursula Gräfe	Kat Menschik	2013	DuMont Buchverlag
Czech	Podivná knihovna	Tomáš Jurkovič	Kat Menschik	2014	Odeon
English	The Strange Library	Ted Goossen	Suzanne Dean	2014	Harvill Secker
English	The Strange Library	Ted Goossen	Chip Kidd	2014	Knopf
Spanish	La biblioteca secreta	Lourdes Porta	Kat Menschik	2014	Libros del zorro rojo
French	L'étrange bibliothèque	Hélène Morita	Kat Menschik	2015	Belfond
Italian	La strana biblioteca	Antonietta Pastore	Lorenzo Ceccotti	2015	Einaudi
Turkish	Tuhaf Kütüphane	Ali Volkan Erdemir	Kat Menschik	2016	Dogan Kitap
Danish	Det mystiske bibliotek	Mette Holm	Kamila Slocinska	2019	Forlaget Klim
Bengali	অদ্ভুত এক লাইব্রেরি	Afsana Begum		2018	Prokriti-Porichoy
