= Shōichi Watanabe =

Japanese scholar of English (1930–2017)

- 渡部 昇一
- Born: September 15, 1930; Tsuruoka, Yamagata Prefecture
- Died: April 17, 2017 (aged 86); Suginami, Tokyo
- Occupation: English scholar
- Known for: One of Japan's foremost cultural critics
- Spouse: Michiko Watanabe
- Children: 3

Academic background
- Education: University of Münster (Ph.D.); Sophia University; Yamagata Tsuruoka Minamo Highschool

Academic work
- Institutions: Sofia University
- Main interests: English grammar, History of Japan

Shōichi Watanabe (渡部 昇一, Watanabe Shōichi; 15 September 1930 – 17 April 2017) was a Japanese scholar of English and one of Japan's cultural critics. He is known for ultranationalist historical negationism.

He was born in Tsuruoka, Yamagata Prefecture. A graduate of Sophia University, where he obtained his Master's degree, he completed his doctorate at University of Münster in 1958. Two volumes of autobiography on his years in Germany narrate his varied experiences during this period. Returning to his alma mater, he became successively lecturer, assistant professor and full professor, until his retirement. He served as emeritus professor at the same university until his death. A passionate book-collector, he was chairman of the Japan Bibliophile Society. His personal collection of books on English philology (see Bibliography) was perhaps his most important contribution to the field of English philology in Japan, containing many rare items.

== History ==
Shoichi Watanabe was born and raised in Tsuruoka, Yamagata.

After receiving his Bachelor's degree and Master's degree from Sophia University, he studied at the University of Münster, where he was awarded a DPhil in 1958 and became a research student at Jesus College, Oxford University. His doctoral thesis written in German was on the history of English grammar, and was translated into Japanese and English.

In 1960 he took up a post at Sophia University, where he received an honorary degree of DPhil h.c. from the University of Münster in 1994. In 2001 he became a Professor Emeritus at Sophia University.

He died of heart failure on 17 April 2017 at a hospital in Suginami, Tokyo, aged 86.

== Historical negationism ==
A conservative opinion-leader affiliated to the openly negationist organization Nippon Kaigi, Watanabe was known for his Nanjing Massacre denial, attributing the known killings to the standard revenge of regular soldiers in war against guerrilla combatants whom they have captured. As he later clarified, in his view, the concept of massacre in war should properly be reserved for atrocities against a civilian population, where the numbers roughly exceed the range of 40–50 victims, as opposed to the wholesale killing of irregular insurgents. Generally Watanabe's perspective closely echoes the line taken by Japanese generals before the International Military Tribunal for the Far East in the Tokyo War Crimes Trial of 1948.

Again, with regard to the Japanese history textbook controversies, which followed on Saburo Ienaga's suit against the Japanese Education Ministry, Watanabe was almost alone in controverting the general consensus of editorialists writing for the Japanese mainstream press (Mainichi Shimbun, Asahi Shimbun), and upholding the Ministry's prerogative to intervene directly in the content of textbooks used in Japanese primary and secondary schools.

In Watanabe's view, the decisive incident leading to Japan's full-scale war in mainland China, namely the Marco Polo Bridge Incident in 1937, is to be read as an underhand Chinese Communist Party plot against Japan, and the versions of history taught in pre-war Japanese school textbooks are more reliable than those available today to students.

Watanabe remained a controversial figure, but predominantly on the Japanese scene. He was little known abroad, even in his own academic area of specialization. He disconcerted foreigners by telling them that Japan's "racial purity" was to be cherished. His prolific writings include a number of books on the "Japanese spirit".

Hata Ikuhiko has claimed that Watanabe's book on the German General Staff is characterized by wholesale plagiarism from a German source.

== Critics ==
Books criticizing Watanabe include:

- Ikuhiko Hata (秦郁彦), Nanking jiken – gyakusatsu no kōzō (南京事件 —「虐殺」の構造), Chūō Kōronsha (中央公論社), Tokyo 1986
- Shōwa-shi no nazo o ou, 2 vols. by Bungei Shunjū, Tokyo 1993/1999
- Roy Andrew Miller, The Japanese Language in Contemporary Japan:Some sociolinguistic observationsAEI-Hoover Policy Studies, 22, 1977 pp. 9ff.
- Peter Nicholas Dale, The Myth of Japanese Uniqueness, Croom Helm, Oxford and London 1986 pp. 63–64,82–88

== Bibliography ==
- Nihonshi kara mita nihonjin (日本史から見た日本人), Sangyō Nōritsu Tanki Daigaku Shuppan (産業能率短期大学出版), 1973
- Nihongo no kokoro (日本語の心), Kōdansha Gendai Shinsho (講談社現代新書), Tokyo 1974
- Chiteki seikatsu no hōhō (知的生活の方法), Kōdansha Gendai Shinsho, Tokyo 1976
- Kokugo no ideorogī (国語のイデオロギー), Chūō Kōronsha (中央公論社), Tokyo 1977
- Seigi no jidai (正義の時代), Bungei Shunjū, Tokyo 1977
- Nihonrashisa no kōzō (「日本らしさ」の構造), Kōdansha Gakujutsu Bunko (講談社学術文庫), 1977
- Zoku-Nihonshi kara mita nihonjin (続・日本史から見た日本人), Sangyō Nōritsu Tanki Daigaku Shuppan (産業能率短期大学出版),1977
- Bunka no jidai (文化の時代), Bungei Shunjū, Tokyo 1978
- Zoku-Chiteki seikatsu no hōhō (続・知的生活の方法), Kōdansha Gendai Shinsho (講談社現代新書), Tokyo 1979
- Nihon, soshite nihonjin (日本 そして日本人), Shōdensha NON book (祥伝社ノン・ブック), Tokyo, 1980
  - The Peasant Soul of Japan, Palgrave Macmillan, London 1989
- Doitsu ryūgakki (ドイツ留学記), Kōdansha Gendai Shinsho, Tokyo 1980, 2 vols.
- Bibliotheca Philologica Watanabeiensis: The Catalogue of Philological Books in the Library of Professor Shoichi Watanabe. Yushodo, Tokyo 2001,

== See also ==
- Nihonjinron
