= My Forsaken Star =

Autobiography of Annie Park

- Author: Annie Park (朴玉順)
- Original title: 내별은어느하늘에: 白人混血兒洋公主의手記
- Language: Korean
- Publisher: Seoul: Wangja Chulpansa (王子出版社)
- Publication date: 1965
- Publication place: South Korea
- Pages: 258
- OCLC: 44172162

- My Forsaken Star
- Hangul: 내 별은 어느 하늘에: 백인 혼혈아 양공주의 수기
- Hanja: 내 별은 어느 하늘에: 白人 混血兒 洋公主의 手記
- Literal meaning: What sky will my star go to: Diary of a mixed-race prostitute
- Revised Romanization: Nae byeoreun eoneu haneure: Baegin honhyeora yanggongjuui sugi
- McCune–Reischauer: Nae pyŏrŭn ŏnŭ hanŭre: Paegin honhyŏra yanggongjuŭi sugi

My Forsaken Star or My Star in What Sky are English names used to refer to the Korean-language autobiography of Annie Park. The book's English subtitle was "Question Forever".

Park, the Eurasian daughter of a South Korean prostitute and an American soldier stationed in South Korea, found out about her mother's occupation one night at age six by following her to work; as Park returned home that same night, she was lured into an alley and sexually assaulted by a stranger. Park herself began working as a prostitute at age 16. She and a ghostwriter authored and published her book in South Korea three years later. The book became a best-seller, and was serialised in newspapers at the time; a movie based on the book began filming in late November 1965. The movie version was the debut performance of Yi Yeong-ok; Yi would go on to act in a number of other movies, such as the 1972 Janghwa Hongryeonjeon.

There were also plans to create a South Korean television series based on My Forsaken Star, as well as a U.S. version of the book. Kodansha published a Japanese translation by Naoki Matsumoto in 1966 under the title Waga Hoshiha Izukoni: Aoimeno Kankoku Joseino Shugi ("Where Will My Star Go: Diary of a Blue-Eyed Korean Girl").
