= Shogo Sato =

Japanese novelist

- 佐藤 正午
- Born: Kenryu Sato; 25 August 1955 (age 70)
- Occupation: Novelist

Shogo Sato (佐藤 正午, Satō Shōgo; born Kanetaka Sato (佐藤 謙隆, Satō Kanetaka), 25 August 1955) is a Japanese novelist.

== Biography ==
He was born in Sasebo, Nagasaki. He graduated from Sasebo North High School, and dropped out from Hokkaido University Department of Literature. While studying at university, he was impressed after reading Isahaya Shōbu Nikki (1977) by the writer Kuninobu Noro, and started writing novels when he got a reply by writing a fan letter. In 1979 he went back to Sasebo after leaving the university, won the Subaru Literary Award for his long-awaited novel Eien no 1/2 (永遠の1/2, Eien no Nibun no Ichi) written in 1983 for two years, and debuted as a writer. He made his pen name "Shogo" (正午, Shōgo; "Noon") because he said that he heard the sound of a siren from a fire department in Sasebo City ringing at noon in the age of amateurs and coming up with the custom of starting to write novels.

His other representative works include Revolver (1985), Kojin Kyōju (1988, Yamamoto Shūgorō Prize nominate), Kanojo ni tsuite Shiru koto no subete (1995), Y (1998), Jump (2000), Minoue Banashi (2009), etc., in which Y an Jump were bestsellers. In 2015, he won the Futaro Yamada Award for Hato no Gekitai-hō. In 2017, he later won the 157th Naoki Prize for Tsuki no Michi Kake.

Bicycle racing has been his long-standing hobby, and several works were on the subject of bicycle racing, such as Eien no 1/2, his short story Kimi wa Gokai shite iru, his column collection on bicycle racing side B, etc., were also published.

== Bibliography ==
=== Novels ===
==== Featured ====
Dates	Title	Publishers	Notes
Jan 1984; May 1986; Oct 2016	Eien no 1.2	Shueisha; Shueisha Bunko; Shogakukan Bunko	
Dec 1984; Jul 1987	Ōsama no Kekkon	Shueisha; Shueisha Bunko	His short novel "Aoi Kasa" was completed
Nov 1985; Apr 1988; Dec 2007	Revolver	Shueisha; Shueisha Bunko; Kobunsha Bunko	
Apr 1986; May 1988	Bico's	Kobunsha; Kobunsha Bunko	
Feb 1987; Apr 1990; Nov 2001	Koi o Kazoete	Kodansha; Kodansha Bunko; Kadokawa Bunko	
Mar 1987; May 1990	Dōtei Monogatari	Shueisha; Shueisha Bunko	
Dec 1988; Sep 1991; Mar 2002	Kojin Kyōju	Kadokawa Shoten; Kadokawa Bunko	
Aug 1991; Feb 1998; Oct 2008	Hōtō-ki	Kodansha; Haruki Bunko; Kobunsha Bunko	
Jul 1995; Jan 1999; Nov 2007	Kanojo ni Tsuite Shiru koto no Subete	Shueisha; Shueisha Bunko; Kobunsha Bunko	
Dec 1996; Jul 2001	Toriatsukai Chūi	Kadokawa Shoten; Kadokawa Bunko	
Oct 1998; May 2001	Y	Kadokawa Haruki Corporation; Haruki Bunko	
Sep 2000; Oct 2002	Jump	Kobunsha; Kobunsha Bunko	
Jan 2007; Jan 2010	5	Kadokawa Shoten; Kadokawa Bunko	
Dec 2007; Jan 2011	Under Report	Shueisha; Shueisha Bunko	
Feb 2009	Osananajimi	Iwanami Shoten	
Jul 2009; Nov 2011	Minoue Banashi	Kobunsha; Kobunsha Bunko	
Nov 2014	Hato no Gekitai-hō	Shogakukan	
Sep 2015	Under Report/Blue	Shueisha Bunko	Complete edition with the short story "Blue" drawn at a later date
Apr 2017	Tsuki no Michi Kake	Iwanami Shoten	
2025	Ripe Persimmon	Kadokawa	

==== Short stories ====
Dates	Title	Publishers
Apr 1988	Onna ni tsuite	Kodansha
Dec 1988; Mar 1993	Natsu no Jōfu	Shueisha; Shueisha Bunko
Apr 1991	(Renamed) Koi Urimasu	Kodansha Bunko
Apr 1991; Jan 1997; Dec 2012	Ninjin Club	Shueisha; Shueisha Bunko; Kobunsha Bunko
May 1993; Sep 2001	Spain no Ame	Shueisha; Kobunsha Bunko
Mar 1997; Feb 2000	Burnishing Point	Shueisha; Shueisha Bunko
Jan 1999; Jan 2002; Jan 2013	Couples	Shueisha; Shueisha Bunko; Shogakukan Bunko
May 2000; Oct 2003; Mar 2012	Kimi wa Gokai shite iru	Iwanami Shoten; Shueisha Bunko; Shogakukan Bunko
Apr 2001	(Reverted) Onna ni tsuite	Kobunsha Bunko
Sep 2005	Hana no yōna Hito	Iwanami Shoten
Jun 2011; Nov 2013	Dance Hall	Kobunsha; Kobunsha Bunko
Sep 2011	(Renamed) Koto no Shidai	Shogakukan Bunko

=== Essays, others ===
Dates	Title	Publishers	Notes
Jun 1989	Watashi no Inu made Aishite hoshī	Shueisha Bunko	
Jan 2001; Mar 2007	Ari no susabi	Iwanami Shoten; Kobunsha Bunko	
Dec 2001; Apr 2008	Zō o Arau	Iwanami Shoten; Kobunsha Bunko	
Dec 2002; Jul 2007	side B	Shogakukan; Shogakukan Bunko	
Feb 2005; Mar 2009	Buta o Nusumu	Iwanami Shoten; Kobunsha Bunko	
Jun 2006	Shōsetsu no Yomikaki	Iwanami Shoten	
Nov 2009	Shogo-ha	Shogakukan	
Jun 2015	Kaku Interview (1, 2)	Shogakukan Bunko	Interview readings (listeners: Kotoko Ito, Yumi Higashine)
Feb 2016	Shōsetsuka no Shiki	Iwanami Shoten	

=== Anthologies ===
Works by Shogo Sato are inside quotation marks ("")

Dates	Title	Works	Publishers
Jul 1988	Liaison–6-tsu no Koi no Monogatari	Shufunotomo	"Itokiriba"
Apr 1989; Jul 1993	Jū Nana-tsubu no Biyaku	Magazine House; Kadokawa Bunko	"Furueru Onna"
Jul 1995; Nov 1997	Tobaku-shi-tachi	Kadokawa Shoten; Kadokawa Bunko	"Kimi wa Gokai shite iru"
Jul 2001	Hito no Monogatari	Kadokawa Shoten	"Ai no Chikara o Uyamae"
Jan 2004	Love Stories	Suiyō-sha	"Earring"
Mar 2005	Himitsu.–Watashi to Watashi no aida no Jū Ni-wa	Da Vinci Books Bunko	"Niratama A", "Niratama B"
Aug 2007; May 2009	Otona no Kataomoi	Kadokawa Haruki Corporation; Haruki Bunko	"Magokoro"

== Imaging works ==
Films

Date	Title	Distributor	Director	Lead actor
21 Nov 1987	Eien no 1/2	Toho	Kichitaro Negishi	Saburō Tokitō
22 Oct 1988	Revolver	Cine Ropponica	Toshia Fujita	Kenji Sawada
8 May 2004	Jump	Cinequanon	Masao Takeshita	Taizo Harada
19 May 2012	Kanojo ni tsuite Shiru koto no subete	King Record	Kishu Izuchi	Ai Sasamine
2022	Tsuki no Michi Kake	Shochiku	Ryūichi Hiroki	Yo Oizumi

TV dramas

Dates	Title	Network	Series	Lead actor	Original work
8 Jan – 12 Mar 2013	Shotenin Michiru no Minoue Banashi	NHK	Yoru Dora	Erika Toda	Minoue Banashi
