= Translations of The Devil's Dictionary =

Ambrose Bierce's book of satirical definitions, The Devil's Dictionary, has acquired an international reputation as an entertaining and important work of satire, and has been translated from its original American English into other languages many times.

In addition, writers in several countries have made critical observations in non-English languages about The Devil's Dictionary in their introductions and afterwords to Bierce's book, and in scholarly essays.

Some translations, with the first year of publication and of reprints (as well as new printings by other publishers of existing editions), include:

== Arabic ==
- قاموس الشيطان, Turkey, 2023, Khalid Hafez, translator.

== Basque ==
- Deabruaren hiztegia, Bizkaia: Ibaizabal, 2000, Xabier Olarra Lizaso, translator.

== Czech ==
- Ďáblův slovník, Praha: Thyrsus, 1996, Ulmanova, translator.
- Ďáblův slovník, Praha: Plus, 2010, Hana Ulmanova, translator.

== Chinese ==
- 魔鬼辞典 / Mo gui ci dian, Gui lin: Li jiang chu ban she, 1991.
- 魔鬼辭典 / Mo gui ci dian, Taibei Shi: Lin yu wen hua shi ye you xian gong si, 1992.
- 魔鬼语录 / Mo gui yu lu, Bei jing: Tuan jie chu ban she, 1998. Xiao Yao Xian, translator.
- 魔鬼辞典 = The Devil's Dictionary / Mo gui ci dian, Bei jing: Zhong guo she hui chu ban she, 1999. Cao Rong Xiang, translator.
- 新魔鬼辭典 : 憤世嫉俗者詞匯手冊 / Xin mo gui ci dian: fen shi ji su zhe ci hui shou ce, Tai bei shi: Feng yun shi dai chu ban Tai bei xian zhong he shi: Cheng xin wen hua zong jing xiao, 2000.
- 魔鬼辞典 / Mo Gui Ci Dian, Bei jing: Jin cheng chu ban she, 2001.
- 魔鬼辞典 / Mo gui ci dian, Hu he hao te: Nei meng gu ren min chu ban she, 2001.
- 魔鬼辞典 / 愤世嫉俗词汇手册 / Mo Gui Ci Dian = The devils dictionary: fen shi ji su ci hui shou ce, Bei jing: Guang ming ri bao chu ban she, 2001.
- 魔鬼辞典, 原名, 一个犬儒主义者的手册 / Mo gui ci dian, Bei jing: Zhong guo mang wen chu ban she, 2002.
- 新魔鬼辭典: 憤世嫉俗者詞匯手册 / Xin mo gui ci dian: fen shi ji su zhe ci hui shou ce, Taibei Shi: Feng yun shi dai chu ban gu fen you xian gong si, 2002.
- 魔鬼辞典 : 插图本 / Mo gui ci dian: cha tu ben, Beijing: Ren min wen xue chu ban she, 2006. Yang Dan, or Wen Hui Jing, translator.
- Mo gui ci dian, Harbin Shi: Harbin chu ban she, 2006.

== French ==
- Le dictionnaire du diable, Paris: Les quatre jeudis, 1955; Paris: Nouvel office d'édition, 1964; Paris: NéO, 1987. Jacques Papy, translator.
- Dictionnaire du diable, Paris: Pierre Bordas, 1989; Paris: Omnibus, 1998, 2003, 2016. Roland Villeneuve, translator.
- Le dictionnaire du diable, Paris: Payot & Rivages, 1989, 1993, 1996, 1998, 2000, 2014. Bernard Sallé, translator.
- Le dictionnaire du diable: articles inédits (abridged edition). Montélimar: Voix d'Encre 1999. Alain Blanc, translator.
- Le dictionnaire du diable, Paris: Flammarion, DL. 2006. Pascale Haas, translator.
- Le dictionnaire du diable: nouvelles définitions, Montélimar: Voix d'encre, 2005, 2008, 2011. Alain Blanc, translator.

== German ==
- Aus dem Wörterbuch des Teufels. Zurich: Sanssouci, 1964. Afterword by Hugo Loetscher.
- Aus dem Wörterbuch des Teufels. Dieter E. Zimmer, ed. Frankfurt am Main: Insel, 1966; Frankfurt am Main: Taschenbuch, 1980. Translation and afterword by Dieter E. Zimmer.
- From The Devil’s Dictionary – Aus dem Wörterbuch des Teufels (bilingual abridged edition). München: Deutscher Taschenbuch Verlag, 1981, 1988. Translation and afterword by Richard Fenzl.
- Des Teufels kleines Wörterbuch (abridged edition), Hanau: Dausien, 1984, 1986, 1989; Berlin: Eulenspiegel Verlag, 1984, 1985, 1986, 1989; 1996, Hans Petersen, translator.
- Des Teufels Wörterbuch. Wort-Schätze. Zurich: Haffmans 1986; Zurich: Manesse, 2013. Gisbert Haefs, translator.
- The Devil's Dictionary, Stuttgart: Reclam. 1999, Klaus Werner, translator.

== Greek ==
- Alphabetari tou Diavbolou, Athens: Minoas, 2013; Athens: To Vima, 2015.

== Icelandic ==
- Orðabók Andskotans, Reykjavík: JPV, 2001. Hallberg Hallmundarson, translator.

== Italian ==
- Dizionario del Diavolo, Varese: Sugarco Edizioni, 1995.

== Japanese ==
- 完訳悪魔の辞典 (Kan'yaku akuma no jiten; Enlarged Devil's Dictionary). Tōkyō: Sōdosha, Shōwa 47 [1972]. Ernest Jerome Hopkins, editor; Okuda Shunsuke, Kuramoto Mamoru, and Ikari Hiroshi, translators.
- 新撰・新訳悪魔の辞典 / Shinsen shin'yaku akuma no jiten, Tōkyō: Kōdansha, 2000,.Shunsuke Okuda, translator.
- 筒井版惡魔の辞典 : 完全補注 / Tsutsui-ban akuma no jiten : kanzen hochū, Tōkyō: Kōdansha, 2002. Yasutaka Tsutsui, translator.

== Korean ==
- 악마의사전 (Angma ŭi sajŏn), Sŏul: Samhan Ch'ulp'ansa, 1987. Kim Chong-sŏk, translator.
- 악마의사전 (Angma ŭi sajŏn), Sŏul: Usinsa, 1993. Yi Tong-jin, translator.

== Persian ==
- دائرة‌المعارف شیطان (Dayerat ol-Ma'aref-e Shaytan), Tehran: Morvarid, 2001, Mahshid Mirmoezzi, translator.
- فرهنگ شیطان (Farhang-e Shaytan), Tehran: Farhang-e Moaser, 2005, Razi Hirmandi, translator.

== Russian ==
- Словарь сатаны и рассказы / Slovarʹ satany i rasskazy, Moskva: Izdatelʹstvo "Khudozhestvennai︠a︡ literatura", 1966.

== Spanish ==
- El diccionario del diablo, Buenos Aires : Alvarez, 1965; Buenos Aires: Ediciones Cepe, 1972; Montevideo: Banda Oriental, 1983: Madrid: Ediciones del dragon, 1986; Madrid: M.E., 1997; Buenos Aires: Leviatán, 1998; México: Grupo Editorial Tomo, 2000; Madrid: Edimat Libros, 1998, 2005, 2007. Rodolfo Walsh, translator.
- El diccionario del diablo, México, D.F.: Premià Editora, 1977; Madrid Valdemar 1993, 1996, 1998, 2002, 2004, 2009, 2015. Eduardo Stilman, translator.
- Diccionario del diablo: seleccion (abridged edition). España: Catedra, 1999. Aitor Ibarrola, editor and translator.
- Diccionario del diablo, Bogotá (Colombia): McGraw-Hill 2001. Felix Manuel Burgos, translator.
- Diccionario del diablo, Buenos Aires: Ambrosía, 2003.
- El diccionario del diablo, Cordoba, Argentina: El Cid Editor, 2003; Santa Fe, Argentina: El Cid Editor, 2003, 2009.
- El diccionario del diablo, Madrid: Edimat Libros, 2003.
- Diccionario del Diablo, [Caracas?]: La Galera de Tiberio, 2004.
- El diccionario del diablo, Barcelona: Galaxia Gutenberg: Círculo de Lectores, 2005; Barcelona: Debolsillo, 2007, Ernest Jerome Hopkins, ed.; Vicente Campos, translator.
- Diccionario del Diablo, México: Editores Mexicanos Unidos, 2005. Alejandro Torres, translator.
- El diccionario del diablo: version completa, Buenos Aires: Longseller, 2005. Marcos Mayer, translator.
- Diccionario del Diablo, Argentina: Andrómeda, 2007. Laura Gottero, translator.
- Diccionario del diablo, México, D.F.: Lectorum; Miami, FL: L.D. Books, 2007. Catherine Seelig, translator.
- El diccionario del diablo, Arganda del Rey Edimat, 2007.
- Diccionario del diablo, Madrid: Catedra, 2010; Madrid: Alianza Editorial, 2011. Aitor Ibarrola-Armendariz, translator.
- El diccionario del diable, Barcelona: Angle 2015. Pere Guixà, translator.
- Diccionario del diablo, Createspace Independent Press, 2016.

== Swedish ==
- Djävulens ABC, Stockholm : Piccolo, 1967. Mårten Edlund, translator.
