= Wang Wusheng =

Chinese photographer (1945–2018)

Wang Wusheng (Chinese: 汪芜生; 1945 – 7 April 2018) was a Chinese photographer known for his black-and-white photographs of Mount Huangshan.

== Biography ==
Wang Wusheng was born 1945 in Wuhu. Anhui, China and graduated from the Department of Physics of Anhui University.

Beginning in 1973, Wang worked as a photographer for a news magazine in Anhui Province, Anhui Newsphoto and Pictorial. In 1974, he started shooting Mounts Huangshan in Anhui.

In 1981 he moved to Japan. He became a research member at the Japan Foundation in 1983. He studied at the Art Institute of Nihon University in Japan as he won grant from the Japan Foundation's endowment for Japanese art studies. During these years he met and married an American exchange student studying at The University of Tokyo. Beginning in 1986, he studied for three years at the Tokyo Arts University.

In 1990, he moved to the U.S., spent a year in New York City and in the 90s his career blossomed at last. In 1998, Wang Wusheng held a solo exhibition titled "Himmelsberge" at the Kunsthistorisches Museum in Vienna. It was the first exhibition of photography and the first solo exhibition for a living artist at the museum. Then in 2005, the Permanent Missions of China and Japan to the United Nations presented Spirit of the East a two-person exhibition of Wang Wusheng's photographs along with paintings by the late Japanese master artist Kaii Higashiyama, in the United Nations General Assembly's Visitor's Lobby. This exhibition was held in commemoration of the 60th anniversary of the United Nations.

Wang's photographs are represented in numerous public and private collections, including those of the Friedrich Christian Flick Collection in Berlin, the Kunsthistorisches Museum in Vienna, National Art Museum of China in Beijing, Shanghai Art Museum, Tokyo Metropolitan Museum of Photography, Robert Klein Gallery in Boston, Kunsthalle Krems in Austria, in Russia, United States, and Ukraine.

Wang died in Shanghai on 7 April 2018, at the age of 73.

== Group exhibitions ==
- 1997 : The Gravity of the Mountains: Mountains and Inner Worlds from the Romantics to the Present at Kunsthalle Krems, Austria
- 2001 : The Photo Exhibition of National Treasure Ganjinwajo at the Tokyo Metropolitan Museum of Photography, Japan
- 2003 : Ganjinwajo: The Fine Art Photography Exhibition of 10 International Masters at the Shanghai Library, Shanghai, China
- 2008 : Yellow Mountain: China's Ever-Changing Landscape, (showed the Chinese landscape paintings of the 17th century and the 18th century, and the photography of Wang Wusheng), at The Arthur M. Sackler Gallery, Washington, D.C. USA
- 2012 : Contemporary Chinese Photography Rising Dragon, at the Krannert Art Museum, Illinois, USA
- 2012 : Contemporary Chinese Photography Rising Dragon, at Katonah Museum of Art, New York, USA
- 2013 : Contemporary Chinese Photography Rising Dragon, at The San Jose Museum of Art, San Jose, USA
- 2015 : Chinese Photography : Twentieth Century and Beyond, at Three Shadows Photography Art Centre, Beijing, China
- 2016 : Celestian Realm, Mt. Huangshang at La Galerie, Hong-Kong

== Solo exhibitions ==
- 2014 : Celestial Realm at Brucie Collections Gallery, Kyiv, Ukraine
- 2013 : Celestial Realm at Barry Friedman, Ltd. New York, USA
- 2010 : Hometown at Shanghai Mart, Shanghai, China
- 2008 : Yellow Mountains at Robert Klein Gallery, Boston, USA
- 2006 : Spirit of the East (with Kaii Higashiyama), Higashiyama Kaii Memorial Hall, Ichikawa, Japan
- 2005 : Spirit of the East (with Kaii Higashiyama), United Nations, New York, USA
- 2002 : Mount Huangshan, Gallery epSITE, Tokyo, Japan
- 2000 : Celestial Mountains at the Tokyo Metropolitan Museum of Photography, Tokyo, Japan
- 1998 : Himmelsberge, at the Kunsthistorisches Museum, Vienna, Austria
- 1996 : Verve of Mt. Huangshan at Asakura Gallery, Tokyo, Japan
- 1995 : Verve of Mt. Huangshan at Shanghai Art Museum, Shanghai, China
- 1994 : Verve of Mt. Huangshan at Galleria Prova, Tokyo; Oxy Gallery, Osaka; Isetan Art Hall, Niigata; Iwataya Art Gallery, Fukuoka; National Art Museum of China, Beijing
- 1993 : Verve of Mt. Huangshan, at Mitsukoshi Main Store Gallery, Tokyo, Japan
- 1988 : Visions of the Tranquility of Mount Huangshan, at Seibu Museum of Art, Tokyo, Japan

== Publications ==
- 1981 : Mt. Huangshan: Works of Wang Wusheng, People's Fine Arts Publishing House, Beijing, China
- 1988 : Visions of the Tranquility of Mount Huangshan, Kodansha Ltd. Publisher, Tokyo, Japan 2011
- 1993 : Verve of Mt. Huangshan, Kodansha Ltd. Publisher, Tokyo, Japan, Hometown, Anhui, China
- 1994 : Artistic Interpretation of the Huangshan Mountain, Kodansha Ltd. Publisher, Tokyo, Japon & China Youth Publishing House, Beijing, China
- 1998 : Himmelsberge Catalog, Kunsthistorisches Museum in Vienna, Austria & Skira Editore Publisher, Milan, Italy
- 2000 : Celestial Mountains Catalog, Japan-China Association, Tokyo, Japon
- 2005 : Celestial Realm: The Yellow Mountains of China, Abbeville Press Publisher, New York, USA/London, UK
- 2006 : Huangshan, Montagnes Célestes, Imprimerie Nationale Publisher, Paris, France

== See also ==
- Lang Jingshan
