= List of Listen to Me, Girls. I Am Your Father! episodes =

The cover of the first Blu-ray compilation for Listen to Me, Girls. I Am Your Father! released by King Records (Japan)

The anime series, Listen to Me, Girls. I Am Your Father! (パパのいうことを聞きなさい!, Papa no Iukoto wo Kikinasai!) is based on the Japanese light novel of the same name written by Tomohiro Matsu and illustrated by Yuka Nakajima. Its anime adaption is produced by PPP and animated by Feel. The story follows Yuuta Segawa, a first year college student. After his sister goes missing in a plane crash, he is left to care for his sister's three daughters from her marriage.

The series aired in Japan between January 11, 2012, and March 28, 2012, with an additional episode released on the fifth Blu-ray/DVD volume on July 1, 2012. The series was simulcast by Crunchyroll. An original video animation was bundled with the 13th light novel volume on June 25, 2013. Sentai Filmworks released the series in North America on February 5, 2013.

Two theme music were used for the series: The opening theme is "Happy Girl" by Eri Kitamura while "Coloring" by Yui Horie is used for the ending.

== Production team ==
List of Listen to Me, Girls, I Am Your Father!'s original work was written by Tomohiro Matsu and illustrated by Yuka Nakajima. The producer company is PPP with animations done by Feel, art by Studio Biho, music by Starchild Records, and voice recordings done by Studio Mausu. The overall series is directed Itsuro Kawasaki and his assistant Kei Oikawa. Other directors includes Toshihiro Kohama who directed the art, Yoshikazu Iwanami the sound, and Yasumasa Koyama the sound effects. The script of the animation were written by Naruhisa Arakawa, Yoshimi Narita, Masaharu Amiya, and Keiichirō Ōchi and the character designs were created by Takashi Mamezuka.

== Episode list ==
No.	Title	Original release date ^{JST}	Refs.
1	"Don't Call Me Daddy"; Transliteration: "Papa to Yobanaide" (Japanese: パパと呼ばないで)	January 11, 2012	
Yuuta Segawa begins his first year of college. Three months later he meets Kouichi Nimura, Raika Oda and Shuntarou Sako, who are members of the Street Observation Research Society. On the request of his older sister, Yuri Takanashi, Yuuta visits her family and is introduced to her daughters, Hina, Miu and Sora.
2	"Come to My House"; Transliteration: "Uchi e Oideyo" (Japanese: 家へおいでよ)	January 18, 2012	
After Yuuta spends the day with his three nieces, Yuri asks him to mind them while she takes a week-long trip with her husband, Shingo. While Yuuta looks after the girls, Yuri's plane crashes and she and Shingo are reported missing. Due to limited living arrangements, the girls' other relatives plan to split them up per but Yuuta intervenes and asks the three girls if they want to live with him.
3	"I Won't Cry"; Transliteration: "Naite Tamaruka" (Japanese: 泣いてたまるか)	January 25, 2012	
In the early morning, Yuuta takes the three girls home with him. On the way, he searches for a restaurant where they can eat without reminders of the girls' parents. They end up at a karaoke restaurant with Nimura, who learns about Yuuta's predicament. Yuuta gets a phone call from his aunt, who questions his dedication to the three girls. Afterwards, the four of them spend time settling into Yuuta's two room apartment; Sora and Miu hide their grief over their parents' death from Hina, who does not yet know.
4	"Wonderful Life"; Transliteration: "Wandafuru Raifu" (Japanese: ワンダフルライフ)	February 1, 2012	
The next day, Yuuta and the girls secretly worry about their financial situation. The girls, noticing Yuuta's food bill, decide to do chores around the apartment in return. Yuuta returns home from work and sees Sora's cooking become a disaster. After scolding them for endangering themselves, Yuuta gives them a cake. That night, Sora expresses her worries about their finances; Yuuta comforts her, telling her they will get by.
5	"What Happened to the Girl"; Transliteration: "Shōjo ni Nani ga Okotta ka" (Japanese: 少女に何が起こったか)	February 8, 2012	
Yuuta leaves for work, forgetting his phone. Sako calls, and is attracted to Miu after hearing her voice and finding out that Yuuta's nieces are living with him. After Sora leaves to deliver Yuuta's phone to him, Miu and Hina meet their neighbor, Kurumi Atarashi. Sora gets lost after returning Yuuta's phone and reminisces about her first meeting with Yuuta, which concluded in her calling him Onii-chan (お兄さん, lit. older brother), a more personal honorific than Oji-san (叔父さん, lit. uncle). Yuuta learns Sora is lost when he calls Miu, and looks for her. After he finds her, Yuuta agrees to let Sora call him Onii-chan from then on. That night, Yuuta accepts a part-time job at a strawberry-daifuku factory per Sako's recommendation.
6	"A Wonderful Family Trip"; Transliteration: "Subarashiki Kazoku Ryokō" (Japanese: 素晴らしき家族旅行)	February 15, 2012	
The girls ask Yuuta to take them back to their old home to retrieve some personal belongings. Along the way Sako calls, demanding to meet Yuuta and his nieces. After Hina answers the phone, Sako wants more than ever to meet the girls. When the girls get home Sora and Miu pack; Yuuta spends time with Hina to distract her from thinking about her parents. That night the three girls sleep in the same room as Yuuta since they are now used to his small apartment.
7	"Thanks for Always Putting Up With Us"; Transliteration: "Maido Osawagase Shimasu" (Japanese: 毎度おさわがせします)	February 22, 2012	
Yuuta's aunt visits to check on the four of them; she sees they are doing well, but warns Yuuta his difficulties will increase when school starts. Later Yuuta is trapped by Sako, who asks to see the girls. He refuses, but Raika persuades him to invite the Street Observation Research Society to dinner. After dinner Yuuta asks Raika to teach him how to cook so he can develop a relationship with her. Jealous of Raika, Sora decides to learn with them. After Yuuta leaves for work Sora spills flour on herself and Raika, forcing the girls to take a bath. When Yuuta returns home the girls discuss their plans for the school semester but they are interrupted by the landlady's daughter, who is evicting Yuuta for violating his lease which stipulates how many people can live with him.
8	"I Won't Let That Happen!"; Transliteration: "Yurushi Masen!" (Japanese: ゆるしません！)	February 29, 2012	
Yuuta begins apartment-hunting, assisted by Sora and the Street Observation Society. Meanwhile the landlady, Midorikawa Sawako, scolds Kurumi for being late with the rent; she makes Hina cry, causing her to get ice cream on herself and Sawako. As the two take a bath at Sawako's home, Miu explains their situation to her. Yuuta returns to ask Sawako to postpone his eviction date. Now knowing his situation and charmed by Hina, Sawako's mother, and the real landlady, cancels their eviction and draws up a new lease.
9	"A Little My Way"; Transliteration: "Chotto Maiwei" (Japanese: ちょっとマイウェイ)	March 7, 2012	
School starts and Sora and Miu try to adjust to their long commute. Miu struggles in school due to exhaustion and becomes depressed after learning that her classmates pity her. She runs into Nimura, who takes her around town and fixes her shoes after they get damaged on a crowded train. Miu tells Nimura her troubles and how ashamed she is that her life evokes pity. Nimura replies that her kindness is the source of the pity, and it is all right to be herself. Comforted, Miu returns home and thanks Sora for letting her wander around town.
10	"My Blue Sky"; Transliteration: "Watashi no Aozora" (Japanese: 私の青空)	March 14, 2012	
Sora and Miu have trouble balancing their lives; as a result, Sora quits the glee club and becomes depressed. At the same time, Kurumi is discouraged with her voice-acting career when she cannot find a job. Time passes; Sora is comforted by Raika, and is advised by Yuuta to ask others for help when needed. She rejoins the glee club; Kurumi acknowledges that she loves her work and finds a job.
11	"You're not There When I Want You To Be..."; Transliteration: "Aitai Toki ni Anata wa Inai..." (Japanese: 逢いたい時にあなたはいない…)	March 21, 2012	
Sora, Miu and Yuuta are sleep-deprived. Yuuta's aunt visits, telling him about Sora and Miu's trouble in school; before leaving, she demands that he answer a letter. When everyone else is asleep, Sora finds the letter detailing another uncle's desire to adopt all three girls into his family.
12	"I Love Daddy Most in the World"; Transliteration: "Sekai de Ichiban Papa ga Suki" (Japanese: 世界で一番パパが好き)	March 28, 2012	
Sora decides to tell Hina their parents will never return, causing her to throw a tantrum. Days later Yuuta goes out without informing anyone, leading Sora to follow him. Yuuta visits his sister's grave, where Sora confronts him about her uncle's letter. Yuuta tells her he intends to continue as their guardian; his aunt and Sora's uncle overhear and accept his decision. During Hina's musical performance at her daycare center, Yuuta asks his friends and neighbors to attend to show Hina her new family. During the ending credits, Yuuta is given the deed to the girls' old home, and the four move in and continue their life together.
13	"Warmth"; Transliteration: "Pokka Poka" (Japanese: ぽっかぽか)	July 11, 2012	TBA
Unaired episode which was released on bluray, sometimes referred to as OVA1 Yuuta and the girls win a family trip to a hot spring resort, where they are unexpectedly followed by Raika, Kouichi and Shuntarou. As they spend time at the swimming pool, Sora becomes concerned that Raika might have feelings for Yuuta. She gets more anxious when she believes Raika wants to take Yuuta to a Lovers' Cape, though in the end, it turns out she wanted to take Hina. The next day, everyone goes to the Lovers' Cape to ring the bell together, making a wish that they'll all be together forever.
OVA1	"8 Boys and Girls' Summer Stories"; Transliteration: "Danjo Hachi-nin no Natsu Monogatari" (Japanese: 男女8人夏物語)	June 25, 2013	TBA
Through certain circumstances, Sora and Raika end up trapped in a closet together, ending up in the further states of undress in order to try to get themselves free. Meanwhile, Miu gives some fashion advice to her friend and neighbor, Shiori Kitahara. Later, Hina goes off by herself towards a Ferris wheel, causing panic amongst Yuuta and the others. After Shiori manages to find Hina and reunite her with her family at the ferris wheel, Hina reveals she wanted to go on the Ferris wheel to show Yuri a picture for her birthday.
OVA2	"A Spring with Special Visitors"; Transliteration: "Ijin-tachi to no Haru" (Japanese: 異人たちとの春)	March 25, 2015	TBA
Four years after their disappearance, the spirits of Yuri and Shingo decide to pay a visit to the Takanashi household to see how Yuuta and the girls have grown. After looking around the house, the pair go to observe each of the girls at their respective schools, learning that Yuuta and Sora are marrying each other. Later, as Hina comes down with a fever, but luckily Yuuta and Sora are there to look after her. Afterwards, Sora and Yuuta give their thanks to Yuri and Shingo, who give their blessing before returning to the afterlife.

== Home media releases ==
King Records (Japan) compiled the individual episodes into Blu-ray and DVD compilations in Japan. The first Blu-ray volume was released on March 7, 2012, while the first DVD volume was slated for April 11, 2012.

King Records (Japan) (Japan, Region 2 Blu-ray)
Volume	Episodes	BD Release date
Volume 1	1	March 7, 2012
Volume 2	2–4	April 11, 2012
Volume 3	5–7	May 9, 2012
Volume 4	8–10	June 6, 2012
Volume 5	11–13	July 11, 2012

King Records (Japan) (Japan, Region 2 DVD)
Volume	Episodes	DVD Release date
Volume 1	1–3	April 11, 2012
Volume 2	4–6	May 9, 2012
Volume 3	7–9	June 6, 2012
Volume 4	10–13	July 11, 2012

== Notes and references ==
Notes

- ^JST The episodes air after midnight JST but are presented on the previous day's schedule.

General

- "Episode title and airdates" (in Japanese). Tokyo MX.

Specific
