= List of Magical Girl Lyrical Nanoha drama CDs =

Fourteen drama CDs have been released between 2004 and 2009 for the anime and manga series Magical Girl Lyrical Nanoha written by Masaki Tsuzuki.

== Magical Girl Lyrical Nanoha ==
=== Magical Girl Lyrical Nanoha Sound Stage 01 ===
Magical Girl Lyrical Nanoha Sound Stage 01 (魔法少女リリカルなのは サウンドステージ01, Mahō Shōjo Lyrical Nanoha Saundo Steeji 01) is a drama CD first released on November 26, 2004, by King Records bearing the catalog number KICA-666. It contains sixteen tracks and covers a duration of 48:24. It features dialogue between the different characters of the anime television series Magical Girl Lyrical Nanoha and takes place between episodes two and three, with the main cast visiting the pool and Nanoha sealing a Jewel Seed while there. It also features three pieces of music entitled "Precious Time", "Kitto Stand By You", and "Flying High!" performed by Rie Kugimiya as Arisa Bannings, Ai Shimizu as Suzuka Tsukimura, and Yukari Tamura as Nanoha Takamachi respectively. It peak ranked 179th on the Oricon albums chart and remained on the chart for one week.

Track list
No.	Title	Length
1.	"Nanoha, Mahō no Renshūchū" (なのは、魔法の練習中, Nanoha, While Magical Training)	4:55
2.	"Ohayō" (おはよう, Good Morning)	1:14
3.	"Nakayoshi Trio, Genki ni Gekō" (なかよしトリオ、元気に下校 Nakayoshi Torio, Genki ni Gekō The Close Trio, Returning Home After School)	1:49
4.	"Miyuki to Yūno" (美由希とユーノ, Miyuki and Yūno)	1:33
5.	"Zen'in Shūgo, Poolside" (全員集合、プールサイド Zen'in Shūgo, Pūrusaido, Everyone Assembled, Poolside)	3:19
6.	"Precious time"	4:21
7.	"Oyogimasu ka!" (泳ぎますか！, Will You Swim!?)	5:26
8.	"Kitto Stand By You" (きっとStand by you, Definitely Stand By You)	4:35
9.	"Kiken no Yokan ~ Jewel Seed Hatsudō!" (危険の予感～ジュエルシード発動！, Premonition of Danger ~ Jewel Seed Activate!)	2:06
10.	"VS Suijū" (VS水獣, Versus Water Beast)	3:48
11.	"Nanoha, Aratanaru Mahō!" (なのは、新たなる魔法！, Nanoha, Newly Gained Magic!)	3:02
12.	"Yūno, Hitorigoto" (ユーノ、ひとりごと, Yūno, Soliloquy)	1:36
13.	"Minna Genki Desu" (みんな元気です, Everyone Is Doing Fine)	1:46
14.	"Sora no Yume" (空の夢, Empty Dream)	3:47
15.	"Flying High!"	4:24
16.	"Jikai Yokoku" (次回予告, Preview)	0:35
Total length:		48:24

=== Magical Girl Lyrical Nanoha Sound Stage 02 ===
Magical Girl Lyrical Nanoha Sound Stage 02 (魔法少女リリカルなのは サウンドステージ02, Mahō Shōjo Lyrical Nanoha Saundo Steeji 02) is a drama CD first released on January 13, 2005, by King Records bearing the catalog number KICA-667. It contains nineteen tracks and covers a duration of 1:11:44. It features dialogue between Fate Testarossa, Aruf, Precia Testarossa, and Rinis that takes place between episodes five and six of the anime series Magical Girl Lyrical Nanoha. It also features three pieces of music entitled "Yasashii Yume wo Mireru Yō", "Onaji Yūki", and "Wish" performed by Masumi Asano as Rinis, Natsuko Kuwatani as Aruf, and Nana Mizuki as Fate Testarossa respectively. It peak ranked 168th on the Oricon singles chart and remained on the chart for one week.

Track list
No.	Title	Length
1.	"Fate no Asa" (フェイトの朝 Feito no Asa, Fate's Morning)	6:25
2.	"Linis to Preshia" (リニスとプレシア Rinisu to Pureshia, Linis and Preshia)	3:54
3.	"Ame, Soshite Deai" (雨、そして出会い, Rain, Then a Meeting)	7:42
4.	"Namae wa Arf" (名前はアルフ Namae wa Arufu, My Name is Arf)	1:37
5.	"Okaasan" (お母さん, Mother)	4:45
6.	"Linis, Omou" (リニス、想う, Linis, Thoughts)	4:24
7.	"Yasashii Yume o Mireru yō" (優しい夢を見れるよう, Like Seeing a Tender Dream)	4:23
8.	"Tsukaima no Shimei" (使い魔の使命, The Code of Familiars)	2:43
9.	"Keiyaku no Hi" (契約の日, Day of the Contract)	6:44
10.	"Onaji Yūki" (同じ勇気, Common Courage)	4:36
11.	"Sodachiyuku Hibi" (育ちゆく日々, Days of Growing Up)	1:43
12.	"Fate, Saishū Kadai" (フェイト、最終課題 Feito, Saishū Kadai, Fate, Final Task)	1:48
13.	"Linis no Negai" (リニスの願い Rinisu no Negai, Linis's Wish)	1:43
14.	"Bansan" (晩餐, Dinner)	2:29
15.	"Sono Na wa Bardiche" (その名はバルディッシュ Sono Na wa Barudisshu, Its Name is Bardiche)	4:10
16.	"Hajimari" (始まり, Beginning)	3:03
17.	"Soshite, Genzai" (そして、現在, And Now, the Present)	3:23
18.	"Wish" (Wish)	5:24
19.	"Jikai Yokoku" (次回予告, Preview)	0:37

=== Magical Girl Lyrical Nanoha Sound Stage 03 ===
Magical Girl Lyrical Nanoha Sound Stage 03 (魔法少女リリカルなのは サウンドステージ03, Mahou Shoujo Lyrical Nanoha Saundo Steeji 03) is a drama CD first released on April 6, 2005, by King Records bearing the catalog number KICA-668. It contains nineteen tracks and covers a duration of 1:11:44. It features dialogue between Nanoha Takamachi, Yūno Scrya, Fate Testarossa, Aruf, and Chrono Harlaown that takes place after the conclusion of the anime series Magical Girl Lyrical Nanoha. It also features three pieces of music entitled "Egao ni Naare", "Kimi no Sora ni", and "Skyblue Graduation" performed by Yukari Tamura as Nanoha Tamachi, Kaori Mizuhashi as Yūno Scrya, and Nana Mizuki as Fate Testarossa respectively. It peak ranked 103rd on the Oricon albums chart and remained on the chart for one week.

Track list
No.	Title	Length
1.	"Nanoha to Yūno" (なのはとユーノ, Nanoha and Yūno)	7:19
2.	"Asa no Gakkō" (朝の学校, Morning School)	1:34
3.	"Haha to Musuko - Kanchō to Shitsumukan" (母と息子・艦長と執務官, Mother and Son - Captain and Duties)	1:15
4.	"Kimochi, Wakeaete" (気持ち、わけあえて, Feelings, Partings)	4:35
5.	"Egao ni Naare" (笑顔になあれ,)	4:52
6.	"Fate to Aruf" (フェイトとアルフ Feito to Arufu, Fate and Aruf)	1:38
7.	"Yūno, Omou" (ユーノ、想う, Yūno, Thoughts)	3:39
8.	"Kimi no Sora ni" (君の空に, To Your Sky)	4:26
9.	"Kizuna, "Ima Made" to "Sore Kara"" (絆、『いままで』と『これから』, Bonds, "Thus Far" and "From Now On")	10:18
10.	"Aruf, Sanpochū" (アルフ、散歩中 Arufu Sanpochū, Aruf, While Walking)	1:15
11.	"Fate to Chrono" (フェイトとクロノ Feito to Kurono, Fate and Chrono)	2:29
12.	"Chotto Shita Yūshoku" (ちょっとした夕食 A Small Dinner)	1:57
13.	"Okurimono" (贈り物, Gift)	4:48
14.	""Eeeee!?"" (『えーーーーっ！？』)	1:46
15.	"Omoi o Komete" (想いをこめて, Imbue With Emotion)	0:55
16.	"Skyblue Gradation"	4:11

== Magical Girl Lyrical Nanoha A's ==
=== Magical Girl Lyrical Nanoha A's Sound Stage 01 ===
Magical Girl Lyrical Nanoha A's Sound Stage 01 (魔法少女リリカルなのはA's サウンドステージ01, Mahou Shoujo Lyrical Nanoha A's Saundo Steeji 01) is a drama CD first released on November 23, 2005, by King Records bearing the catalog number KICA-733. It peak ranked 98th on the Oricon albums chart and remained on the chart for one week. It takes place between episodes three and four of the A's anime, and involves the heroes and the Wolkenritter visiting a public bath one evening.

Track list
No.	Title	Length
1.	"Nakayoshi Yonningumi no Hōkago" (仲良し四人組の放課後, After School for the Four Close Friends)	2:51
2.	"Yami no Sho no Aruji to Shugo Kishi no Gogo" (闇の書の主と守護騎士の午後, The Book of Darkness's Master and Its Guardian Knights' Afternoon)	4:13
3.	"Itoshisa to Yasashisa to" (愛しさと優しさと Love and Kindness)	4:51
4.	"Nanoha & Fate, Kitaku" (なのは&フェイト,帰宅 Nanoha & Feito, Kitaku, Nanoha & Fate, On Their Way Home)	4:32
5.	"Brave Hearts"	4:18
6.	"Fate no Ketsudan...?" (フェイトの決断...? Feito no Ketsudan, Fate's Decision...?)	3:15
7.	"Let's go! Super Sentō" (レッツゴー!スーパー銭湯! Rettsu Gō! Sūpā Sentō, Let's Go! Super Bath-House)	1:44
8.	"Hayate Yagami Ke Oden no Jikan, Ofuro no Jikan" (八神家 おでんの時間,お風呂の時間, Hayate Yagami's Family Oden Time, Bath Time)	7:03
9.	"Nanoha & Fate Ichidō, Sentō Taisei" (なのは&フェイト一同,銭湯体勢 Nanoha & Feito Ichiō, Sentō Taisei,)	2:15
10.	"Hayate & Shugo Kishi Ichidō ~ Nuidara Sugoindesu" (はやて&守護騎士一同~脱いだらスゴイんです?)	4:09
11.	"Ofuro de Kutsurogi Time!" (お風呂でくつろぎタイム! Ofuro de Kutsurogi Taimu!, Relaxation Time in the Bath!)	4:40
12.	"Amy & Miyuki, Chotto Hitoyasumi" (エイミィ&美由希,ちょっと一休み Eimī & Miyuki, Chotto Hitoyasumi, Amy & Miyuki, A Little Rest)	1:53
13.	"Suzuka & Hayate Sōgū" (すずか&はやて遭遇, Suzuka & Hayate Encounter)	2:03
14.	"Nanoha & Fate, Love Love Araikko" (なのは&フェイト ラブラブ洗いっこ Nanoha & Feito Rabu Rabu Araikko)	2:49
15.	"Sorezore no Ieji" (それぞれの家路, Everyone's Road Home)	1:13
16.	"Nanoha & Fate, Chiisana Ketsui" (なのは&フェイト 小さな決意 Nanoha, a Tiny Determination)	0:54
17.	"Shamal, Omou" (シャマル,想う Shamaru, Omou, Shamal, Thoughts)	1:39
18.	"Tabi no Shirube" (旅の標, The Mark of a Journey)	4:13
19.	"Jikai Yokoku" (次回予告, Preview)	0:44
Total length:		59:28

=== Magical Girl Lyrical Nanoha A's Sound Stage 02 ===
Magical Girl Lyrical Nanoha A's Sound Stage 02 (魔法少女リリカルなのはA's サウンドステージ02, Mahō Shōjo Lyrical Nanoha A's Saundo Steeji 02) is a drama CD first released on January 12, 2006, by King Records bearing the catalog number KICA-743. "Snow Rain" was featured as an insert song in episode 11 of the anime Magical Girl Lyrical Nanoha A's. It peak ranked 62nd on the Oricon albums chart and remained on the chart for three weeks. It takes place between episodes six and seven, and shows Hayate learning about the Book of Darkness' past, while Nanoha and Fate visit the TSAB main office to discuss future careers.

Track list
No.	Title	Writer(s)	Length
1.	"Hayate, Kitaku" (はやて,帰宅)		6:37
2.	"Kansei Jinkaku" (管制人格)		5:59
3.	"Mugen no Tabiji ~Tomo he~" (無限の旅路~友へ~)		3:45
4.	"Nanoha & Fate, Honkyoku Naibu Kengaku" (なのは&フェイト,本局内部見学)		3:32
5.	"Nanoha & Fate, Futari no Shōrai?" (なのは&フェイト,二人の将来?)		6:25
6.	"Umi Na Daigaku Byōin" (海鳴大学病院)		1:29
7.	"Hayate, Yami no Sho no Ichi to Deau" (はやて,闇の書の意思と出会う)		5:12
8.	"Yami no Sho no Ishi, Kishi Tachi no Kako o Kataru" (闇の書の意思,騎士たちの過去を語る)		7:56
9.	"Nanoha & Fate, Chrono to" (なのは&フェイト,クロノと)		3:41
10.	"Nanoha, Yūno to Denwa" (なのは,ユーノと電話)		3:27
11.	"Fate, Yozora no Shita de" (フェイト,夜空の下で)		2:51
12.	"Tsubasa" (翼)		5:46
13.	"Hayate to, Yami no Sho no Ishi to" (はやてと,闇の書の意思と)		4:16
14.	"Kioku no Kanata" (記憶の彼方)		1:43
15.	"Yagami Ie no Gogo" (八神家の午後)		1:18
16.	"Yoru ~ Yoru Ten no Shu, Hoshizora o Miagete" (夜~夜天の主,星空を見上げて)		3:25
17.	"Snow Rain"	Masaki Tsuzuki (Lyrics), happy soul man (Composition), Ayumi Yasui (Arrangement), Kana Ueda (Performance)	4:37
18.	"Jikai Yokoku" (次回予告)		0:33

=== Magical Girl Lyrical Nanoha A's Sound Stage M ===
A Christmas Special CD with Nanoha and Fate.

=== Magical Girl Lyrical Nanoha A's Sound Stage 03 ===
Magical Girl Lyrical Nanoha A's Sound Stage 03 (魔法少女リリカルなのはA's サウンドステージ03, Mahō Shōjo Lyrical Nanoha A's Saundo Steeji 03) is a drama CD first released on March 8, 2006, by King Records bearing the catalog number KICA-768. It peak ranked 52nd on the Oricon albums chart and remained on the chart for two weeks. It takes place after the main events of the last episode, and involves the TSAB and civilians going flower gazing together.

Track list
No.	Title	Length
1.	"Haru ga Kite" (春が来て)	1:27
2.	"Yagami Uchi no Sono ato" (八神家のその後)	4:05
3.	"Ohanami?" (お花見?)	1:37
4.	"Guruguru Renrakumō" (ぐるぐる連絡網)	4:48
5.	"Hayate to Kishitachi Okurimono to, Yakusoku to" (はやてと騎士たち 贈り物と、約束と)	4:17
6.	"Anata ga Kureta Sora" (あなたがくれた空)	4:42
7.	"Ohanami desu" (お花見です)	3:32
8.	"Fate no Uta wa..." (フェイトの歌は...)	2:11
9.	"Kaze ni Mau Hana" (風に舞う花)	5:10
10.	"Fate to Signum" (フェイトとシグナム)	2:09
11.	"Lindi to Leti, Kataru" (リンディとレティ、語る)	3:18
12.	"Arisa & Suzuka no Eunos-kan" (アリサ&すずかのユーノ観)	1:42
13.	"Chrono ni Tsuite" (クロノについて)	3:40
14.	"Chrono to Amy" (クロノとエイミィ)	1:09
15.	"Nanoha to Vita" (なのはとヴィータ)	1:06
16.	"Hayate to Ishida-ishi" (はやてと石田医師)	6:42
17.	"Fate no Kotae" (フェイトの答え)	5:19
18.	"Nanoha to Signum" (なのはとシグナム)	4:51
19.	"Utage ga Owatte" (宴が終わって)	2:57
20.	"Sorezore no Katei de" (それぞれの家庭で)	0:43
21.	"Drive Ignition" (ドライブ・イグニッション)	2:21
22.	"STARTing STARS"	5:26

== Magical Girl Lyrical Nanoha StrikerS ==
=== Magical Girl Lyrical Nanoha StrikerS Sound Stage M The StrikerS ===
Magical Girl Lyrical Nanoha StrikerS Sound Stage M The StrikerS (魔法少女リリカルなのはStrikerS サウンドステージM The StrikerS, Mahō Shōjo Lyrical Nanoha StrikerS Saundo Steeji M The StrikerS) is a drama CD first released as part of the vol.84 of Megami Magazine on May 1, 2007. It is set before the StrikerS TV Series started.

Track list
No.	Title	Length
1.	"Kidou Rokuka Taichoutachi Yori Goaisatsu" (機動六課隊長たちよりご挨拶)	4:17
2.	"Shitsumon Otayori Kounaa 1 Fate hen" (質問お便りコーナー1 フェイト編)	3:42
3.	"Shitsumon Otayori Kounaa 2 Hayate & Nanoha hen" (質問お便りコーナー2 はやて&なのは編)	4:25
4.	"Shitsumon Otayori Kounaa 3 Ano Hito Haima" (質問お便りコーナー3 あの人はいま)	6:28
5.	"Owakare no Goaisatsu" (お別れのご挨拶)	1:48
6.	"Shuuroku Owari no Taichoutachi" (収録終わりの隊長たち)	1:00
7.	""SF Dai Go Studio" Subaru & Tea" (「SF第五スタジオ」 スバル&ティア)	4:38
8.	"Anata ni Message ~ Fate T. Harlaown "Kodomo Datta Ano Koro Kara"" (あなたにメッセージ～フェイト・T・ハラオウン「子供だったあの頃から」)	3:35
9.	"Anata ni Message ~ Yagami Hayate "Are Kara 10 Nen"" (あなたにメッセージ～八神はやて「あれから10年」)	3:01
10.	"Anata ni Message ~ Takamachi Nanoha "Egao to Yuuki, Anata to Motto"" (あなたにメッセージ～高町なのは「笑顔と勇気、あなたともっと」)	2:44
Total length:		35:38

=== Magical Girl Lyrical Nanoha StrikerS Sound Stage 01 ===
Magical Girl Lyrical Nanoha StrikerS Sound Stage 01 (魔法少女リリカルなのはStrikerS サウンドステージ01, Mahō Shōjo Lyrical Nanoha StrikerS Saundo Steeji 01) is a drama CD first released on May 23, 2007, by King Records bearing the catalog number KICA-853. "Empty Colored Promise" (空色の約束, Sora Iro no Yakusoku) was used as an insert song in episode 8 of the anime Magical Girl Lyrical Nanoha StrikerS. It peak ranked 20th on the Oricon albums chart and remained on the chart for five weeks. It takes place at some point between the fifth and seventh episodes, and involves the main cast going on a mission to retrieve a Lost Logia on Earth.

Track list
No.	Title	Writer(s)	Length
1.	"Seiō Kyōkai" (聖王教会)		1:33
2.	"Haken Ninmu no Ikisaki wa?" (派遣任務の行き先は?)		2:28
3.	"Riin Sōchō!?" (リイン曹長!?)		2:26
4.	"Genchi Tōchaku Sono 1" (現地到着 その1)		1:44
5.	"Genchi Tōchaku Sono 2" (現地到着 その2)		1:35
6.	"Ninmu Kaishi!" (任務開始!)		3:27
7.	"Nanoha-san no..." (なのはさんの...)		1:56
8.	"Kissa Midori ya" (喫茶翠屋)		2:17
9.	"Ichidō Shūgō in Cottage" (一同集合inコテージ)		3:46
10.	"Kazoku no Omoi, Tomodachi no Omoi" (家族の想い、友達の想い)		5:31
11.	"Subaru to Tiana" (スバルとティア)		3:48
12.	"Sora Iro no Yakusoku" (空色の約束)	Masaki Tsuzuki (Lyrics), Hiroaki Sano (Composition and Arrangement), Chiwa Saitō (Performance)	4:57
13.	"Sōin, Sentō Taisei!" (総員、銭湯態勢!)		2:48
14.	"Sentō Jōkyō 1 Taichō Tachito Yūjin to" (銭湯状況1 隊長たちと友人と)		1:36
15.	"Sentō Jōkyō 2 Erio to Caro" (銭湯状況2 エリオとキャロ)		1:00
16.	"Erio to Caro in Rotenburo" (エリオとキャロin露天風呂)		4:36
17.	"Hayate no Omoi" (はやての想い)		3:31
18.	"Hoshi ni Inori o" (星に祈りを)		3:59
19.	"Mokuhyō Hakken!" (目標発見!)		0:51
20.	"Ceiling Fate" (シーリング・ファイト)		4:14
21.	"Kikan" (帰還)		2:17
22.	"Mahō no Kotoba ~Lyrical harmony~" (魔法の言葉～Lyrical harmony～)		3:53
23.	"Jikai Yokoku" (次回予告)		0:33

=== Magical Girl Lyrical Nanoha StrikerS Sound Stage 02 ===
Magical Girl Lyrical Nanoha StrikerS Sound Stage 02 (魔法少女リリカルなのはStrikerS サウンドステージ02, Mahō Shōjo Lyrical Nanoha StrikerS Saundo Steeji 02) is a drama CD first released on July 18, 2007, by King Records bearing the catalog number KICA-854 It peak ranked 16th on the Oricon albums chart and remained on the chart for four weeks. It takes place between episodes 14 and 15, and mainly concerns Fate, Erio and Caro's relationship as a family.

Track list
No.	Title	Length
1.	"Nanoha to Vivio Asa no Fūkei" (なのはとヴィヴィオ 朝の風景)	4:16
2.	"Alto to Lucino Kyūtō Shitsu Nite" (アルトとルキノ 給湯室にて)	5:02
3.	"Yagami Hayate to Shugo Kishi Ichidō" (八神はやてと守護騎士一同)	1:09
4.	"Vivio no Kioku Nanoha no Omoi" (ヴィヴィオの記憶 なのはの想い)	2:58
5.	"Anata no Egao ni" (あなたの笑顔に)	3:48
6.	"Seiō Kyōkai" (聖王教会)	5:05
7.	"Lightning Tai" (ライトニング隊)	7:05
8.	"Mitsumeru Shisen" (見つめる視線)	1:57
9.	"Futari no Negai Fate no Omoi" (2人の願いフェイトの想い)	1:48
10.	"Chrono to Verossa Claudia Bridge" (クロノとヴェロッサ クラウディアブリッジ)	2:06
11.	"Erio to Caro Futari no Omoi" (エリオとキャロ 2人の想い)	2:44
12.	"Itsunohika" (いつの日か)	3:45
13.	"Senmonka" (専門家)	3:21
14.	"Nanoha to Vivio Bed" (なのはとヴィヴィオ ベッド)	1:50
15.	"Oya Toshite" (親として)	2:34
16.	"Arf to Erio Caro" (アルフとエリオ・キャロ)	1:52
17.	"Kazoku Dakara" (家族だから)	0:49
18.	"Fate to, Erio to, Caro to" (フェイトと、エリオと、キャロと)	5:52
19.	"Present"	5:21
20.	"Yagami Ie no Yoru" (八神家の夜)	1:35
21.	"Jikai Yokoku" (次回予告)	0:33

=== Magical Girl Lyrical Nanoha StrikerS Sound Stage 03 ===
Magical Girl Lyrical Nanoha StrikerS Sound Stage 03 (魔法少女リリカルなのはStrikerS サウンドステージ03, Mahō Shōjo Lyrical Nanoha StrikerS Saundo Steeji 03) is a drama CD first released on October 3, 2007, by King Records bearing the catalog number KICA-855. It peak ranked 15th on the Oricon albums chart and remained on the chart for four weeks. It takes place between episodes 18 and 19, and involves the Riot Force Six members recovering from Scaglietti's attack while preparing for the next battle.

Track list
No.	Title	Length
1.	"Senkan Asura Taichō Tachi" (船艦アースラ 隊長たち)	2:20
2.	"Honkyoku Reinforce II to Mary ~Rein no Miru Yume~" (本局 リインフォースIIとマリー～リインの見る夢～ Honkyoku Riinfōsu II to Mari: Riin no Miru Yume, Main Office Reinforce Zwei and Mary: Rein's Dream)	2:03
3.	"Kohan Lutecia Ikkō" (湖畔 ルーテシア一行 Kohan Rūteshia Ikkō)	4:26
4.	"Scaglietti no Ajito Kyōdaitachi" (スカリエッティのアジト 姉妹たち Sukarietti no Ajito Kyōdaitachi, Scaglietti's Hideout - Sisters)	6:45
5.	"Agito Dōtei o Omou" (アギト 道程を想う)	5:24
6.	"Honkyoku Sentaniryō Gijutsu Center" (本局 先端医療技術センター)	8:00
7.	"Futari no Tsubasa" (2人の翼)	4:34
8.	"Kodai Belka Yami no Sho no Ishi to Shugo Kishi to" (古代ベルカ 闇の書の意志と守護騎士と)	6:16
9.	"Anata o Omou" (あなたを想う)	5:38
10.	"Honkyoku Mugen Shoko Yūno to Verossa Schach" (本局無限書庫 ユーノとヴェロッサ・シャッハ)	2:53
11.	"Honkyoku Vita to Rein" (本局 ヴィータとリイン)	1:51
12.	"Seiō Iryō in Shamal to Zafira" (聖王医療院 シャマルとザフィーラ)	1:23
13.	"Asura Kannai Office Space" (アースラ艦内 オフィススペース)	1:06
14.	"Asura Rōka Erio to Caro Fate" (アースラ廊下 エリオとキャロ、フェイト)	3:52
15.	"Asura Office Nanoha to Euro" (アースラオフィス なのはとユーロ)	1:19
16.	"Vita to Shamal" (ヴィータとシャマル)	0:30
17.	"Shukufuku no Kaze" (祝福の風)	5:40
18.	"Sōten no Negai" (蒼天の願い)	1:46
19.	"Chiisana Chikai" (小さな誓い)	4:36
20.	"Jikai Yokoku" (次回予告)	0:35

=== Magical Girl Lyrical Nanoha StrikerS Sound Stage 04 ===
Magical Girl Lyrical Nanoha StrikerS Sound Stage 04 (魔法少女リリカルなのはStrikerS サウンドステージ04, Mahō Shōjo Lyrical Nanoha StrikerS Saundo Steeji 04) is a drama CD first released on December 12, 2007, by King Records bearing the catalog number KICA-856. It peak ranked 24th on the Oricon albums chart and remained on the chart for four weeks. It takes place between the end of the Jail Scaglietti incident and the dissolution of Riot Force Six, and deals with the futures of the members and their former enemies.

Track list
No.	Title	Length
1.	"Fate no Mail" (フェイトのメール)	0:45
2.	"Jyū Ichi Gatsu Kidō Rokuka" (11月 機動六課)	1:54
3.	"108 Buti Ginga to Gen'ya to Mary to" (108部隊 ギンガとゲンヤと、マリーと)	1:24
4.	"Stars Tai no Kyūka Plan" (スターズ隊の休暇プラン)	3:02
5.	"Nanoha Mama to Vivio" (なのはママとヴィヴィオ)	0:51
6.	"Hayate to Verossa" (はやてとヴェロッサ)	2:37
7.	"Kurono to Gen'ya" (クロノとゲンヤ)	1:25
8.	"Lightning Tai" (ライトニング隊」)	1:45
9.	"Chijō Kakuri Shisetsu" (海上隔離施設)	4:12
10.	"Stars Tai, Shuppatsu" (スターズ隊、出発)	1:43
11.	"Zankuto - Hirude Mahō Gakuin" (ザンクト・ヒルデ魔法学院)	4:31
12.	"Port Fall Memorial Garden" (ポートフォール・メモリアルガーデン)	2:37
13.	"Hayate to Vita" (はやてとヴィータ)	1:50
14.	"Shinkō no Hana" (真紅の花)	4:31
15.	"Agito to Shigunamu" (アギトとシグナム)	3:58
16.	"Chijō Kakuri Shisetsu ~Numbers~" (海上隔離施設～ナンバーズ～)	3:13
17.	"Kyūka Shūryō" (休暇終了)	0:58
18.	"Lindie to Erio Kyaro" (リンディとエリオ・キャロ)	1:33
19.	"Futari no Shinro" (2人の進路)	3:16
20.	"Kizuato" (傷痕)	3:41
21.	"Yonnin no Omoi" (4人の思い)	0:58
22.	"Yonnin no Ketsui" (4人の決意)	2:53
23.	"To The Real"	4:41
24.	"Aozora" (青空)	1:33
25.	"Endless Chain"	4:22

=== Magical Girl Lyrical Nanoha StrikerS Sound Stage M3 ===
Set right after StrikerS. Nanoha, Fate and Hayate now 20 years old tells what happened to them after Mobile 6 disbanded and also about the life of the other characters. Vivio who is now 7 years old is also with Nanoha, Fate and Hayate in this Special CD.

Track list
No.	Title	Length
1.	"Goaisatsu" (ごあいさつ)	1:44
2.	"Shuudai Happyou" (重大発表)	3:06
3.	"Shitsumon: Ota Yori Kounaa" (質問・おたよりコーナー！)	2:42
4.	"Stars na Omoide" (スターズな思い出)	2:26
5.	"Lightning na Omoide" (ライトニングな思い出)	1:19
6.	"Takamachi-san no Mainichi" (高町さんちの毎日)	1:48
7.	"Fate-san no Iroiro" (フェイトさんのいろいろ)	6:16
8.	"Hayate Ie no Sonzai" (八神家の存在)	4:54
9.	"Ending" (エンディング)	5:08
10.	"Teana Kara no Message" (ティアナからのメッセージ)	2:43
11.	"Erio Kara no Message" (エリオからのメッセージ)	2:41
12.	"Caro Kara no Message" (キャロからのメッセージ)	3:18
13.	"Subaru Kara no Message" (スバルからのメッセージ)	3:26
Total length:		41:31

=== Magical Girl Lyrical Nanoha StrikerS Sound Stage M4 ===
Magical Girl Lyrical Nanoha StrikerS Sound Stage M4 Megami Magazine Original Drama CD (魔法少女リリカルなのはStrikerS サウンドステージM3メガミマガジンオリジナルドラマCD, Mahō Shōjo Lyrical Nanoha StrikerS Saundo Steeji M4 Megami Magajin Orijinaru Dorama CD) is a drama CD first released as part of the vol.100 of Megami Magazine on September 1, 2008.. It takes place around two years after StrikerS, Hayate now 21 years old spends a day off together w/ her whole family. This special focuses on the Yagami Family.

=== Magical Girl Lyrical Nanoha StrikerS Sound Stage X ===
Magical Girl Lyrical Nanoha StrikerS Sound Stage X (魔法少女リリカルなのはStrikerS サウンドステージX, Mahō Shōjo Lyrical Nanoha StrikerS Saundo Steeji X) is a drama CD first released on October 29, 2008, by King Records bearing the catalog number KICA-943. It peak ranked 14th on the Oricon albums chart and remained on the chart for five weeks. The sound stage takes place three years after StrikerS and features the characters introduced in StrikerS trying to stop a series of killings by the biological weapons known as the Marriage.

==== Track list ====
From Oricon.

Disk 1
No.	Title	Length
1.	"Prologue" (プロローグ)	1:07
2.	"Jiken" (事件)	4:37
3.	"Wangan Keibi Tai" (湾岸警備隊)	5:07
4.	"Mariāju" (マリアージュ)	1:54
5.	"Saikai ~ Tiana to Subaru" (再会~ティアナとスバル)	3:58
6.	"Henkyou Shizen Hogo Tai ~ Erio to Caro" (辺境自然保護隊~エリオとキャロ)	3:22
7.	"Shihen" (詩編)	2:22
8.	"Seiou Kyoukai ~ Shitsuji Ottō to Shisutādiido" (聖王教会~執事オットーとシスターディード)	2:43
9.	"Guen Sabaku ~ Shisutāshahha to Shisutāsein" (グエン砂漠~シスターシャッハとシスターセイン)	3:22
10.	"Subaru no Heya ~ Futari no Omoide Banashi" (スバルの部屋~二人の思い出話)	6:40
11.	"Rikushi 108 Butai Runessa to Ginga" (陸士108部隊 ルネッサとギンガ)	5:10
12.	"Kaigai Hogo Shisetsu Nakajima ka 4 Shimai" (海外保護施設 ナカジマ家4姉妹)	2:54
13.	"Shin'ya Fukuhshokuten" (深夜 服飾店)	1:02
14.	"X Phase 0"	0:30
15.	"Aruto no Kuruma de" (アルトの車で)	2:06
16.	"Tiana to Runessa (1)" (ティアナとルネッサ(1))	1:11
17.	"Toredia Gurāze" (トレディア・グラーゼ)	1:14
18.	"Kasai" (火災)	1:32
19.	"Beruwiidohoteru" (ベルウィードホテル)	4:23
20.	"Okujō" (屋上 マリアージュvsティアナ)	2:49
21.	"Sagasu Beki Mono" (探すべきもの)	3:08
22.	"Vorushi to Subaru ~ Kyūjo Tai Toshite" (ヴォルツとスバル~救助隊として)	3:19
23.	"Subaru no Heya Erio to Caro" (スバルの部屋 エリオとキャロ)	1:49
24.	"Tiana to Runessa (2)" (ティアナとルネッサ(2))	4:01

Disk 2
No.	Title	Writer(s)	Length
1.	"Mugen Shoko ~ Chiisana Shisho" (無限書庫~小さな司書)		3:27
2.	"Agito, Runessa o Tazuneru" (アギト、ルーテシアを訪ねる)		3:09
3.	"Mugen Shoko & Kyōdō Chōsa" (無限書庫&共同調査)		4:05
4.	"Sōsa" (捜査)		2:28
5.	"Ginga to Chinku" (ギンガとチンク)		0:31
6.	"JX705"		3:57
7.	"Doku" (独想)		1:35
8.	"J.S"		5:57
9.	"Aringāden (1)" (マリンガーデン(1))		1:43
10.	"N2R"		1:21
11.	"Aringāden (2)" (マリンガーデン(2))		1:39
12.	"Sōgū" (遭遇)		2:58
13.	"Shinnen" (信念)		5:49
14.	"Rekishi" (歴史)		3:23
15.	"Vorushi & Tiana" (ヴォルツ&ティアナ)		0:27
16.	"Dakedo, Ima wa" (だけど、今は)		4:07
17.	"StarS"		4:58
18.	"Arashi no Ato" (嵐の後)		2:56
19.	"Sen Nen" (1000年)		8:44
20.	"Subaru & Tiana" (スバル&ティアナ)		2:35
21.	"Epilogue" (エピローグ)		0:33
22.	"My Friend"	Mami Kawada	5:33

== Magical Girl Lyrical Nanoha The Movie 1st Drama CD ==
The following drama CDs were released in 2009 as a preview for Magical Girl Lyrical Nanoha The Movie 1st.

== Magical Girl Lyrical Nanoha The Movie 2nd A's Drama CD ==
The following drama CDs were released in 2011 as a preview for Magical Girl Lyrical Nanoha The Movie 2nd A's

== Magical Girl Lyrical Nanoha GOD Sound Stage ==
=== Magical Girl Lyrical Nanoha GOD Sound Stage M ===
Magical Girl Lyrical Nanoha GOD Sound Stage M is a drama CD released on 2012. It features characters from the video game Magical Girl Lyrical Nanoha A's Portable: The Gears of Destiny meeting the versions of Nanoha and Fate from Magical Girl Lyrical Nanoha The Movie 1st.

=== Magical Girl Lyrical Nanoha GOD Sound Stage A ===
Magical Girl Lyrical Nanoha GOD Sound Stage A is a drama CD released on 2012.
