= Atama no Taisou =

Japanese puzzle book series

Atama no Taisou (頭の体操, lit. 'Head Gymnastics') is a series of puzzle collections that were released by Kobunsha, and written by Akira Tago. As of 2010, there were 23 regular volumes with an e-book volume released.

The first volume was published in 1966 and sold more than 2.5 million copies that year. The series sold over 12 million copies and easily became a bestseller.

== Overview ==
While it is a collection of puzzles, the preface and introductions to each chapter emphasize the importance of developing thinking skills, particularly lateral thinking.

The early series also featured citations and adaptations from puzzle books by Sam Lloyd and Henry Ernest Dewdney. The first volume also featured vertical thinking puzzles. Later, puzzles were published in collaboration with puzzle writers such as Nobuyuki Ashigahara and Shin Onodera, as well as puzzles submitted by readers of the series. Some puzzles were the prototypes of the TV show's IQ Engine, as well as commonly used true-or-false quizzes and situational puzzles.

The cover illustrations for the Kappa Books edition are by Yoshitaro Isaka for volumes 1-4, and by Ryotaro Mizuno for volumes 5-7. The creator for volumes 8 and onwards was Susumu Matsushita, along with the paperback edition, as well as the package illustration for the Nintendo DS version. Additionally, Ryotaro Mizuno has been responsible for most of the illustrations in the text since the beginning.

== Impact ==
As a result of the best-selling series, the term "brain exercises" has become widely used in Japan as a synonym for quizzes, puzzles, and thinking skills training. This series has also inspired numerous other titles, including IQ Engine, Magical Brain Power!!, Brain Beauty IQ Supplement, and the Professor Layton Series, some of which feature Tako as a supervisor. Furthermore, Nippon Broadcasting System aired a nationally broadcast radio mini-show, Tako Akira's Radio Brain Exercises, based on the original story and concept, with Tako himself providing the questions until September 1998.

In addition to this series, other books with "brain exercises" in the title have been published, including some written by Tako, such as "Brain Exercises for Ages 50 and Up" (Kadokawa Shoten) and "Tako Akira's Brain Exercises: Elementary School Edition" (Gakken Educational Publishing).

== Nintendo DS version ==
Tago Akira's Brain Exercises (Tago Akira's Brain Exercises) is a Nintendo DS game released by Level-5 in 2009.

There are more than 1,500 questions in the book version, and they have been reprinted in four software packages, with volumes 1 and 2 released on June 18th, and volumes 3 and 4 released on October 8th.

== Series ==
- Brain Exercises Vol. 1: Train your brain with puzzles and quizzes (Kobunsha Kappa Books edition: ISBN 4334002390 Kobunsha Bunko edition Chie no Mori Bunko: ISBN 4334728057)
- Brain Exercises Vol. 2: Taking on a Million Brains Again (ISBN 4334002420 Paperback: ISBN 4334728561)
- Brain Exercises Vol. 3: Travel Around the World with Puzzles (ISBN 4334002455 Paperback: ISBN 4334728855)
- Brain Exercises Vol. 4 This is a Color TV-Style Puzzle (ISBN 4334002471 Paperback: ISBN 433478402X)
- Brain Exercises Vol. 5: Join the Genius Party (ISBN 4334003400 Paperback: ISBN 433478416X)
- Brain Exercises Vol. 6: The Great Adventure of the Time Machine (ISBN 4334003486 Paperback: ISBN 4334784259)
- Brain Exercises Vol. 7: Adventure in the Jungle of the Brain (ISBN 4334004350 Paperback: ISBN 4334786227)
- Brain Exercises Vol. 8: Dream and Adventure Fantasy Puzzle (ISBN 4334004474 Paperback: ISBN 4334786294)
- Brain Exercises Vol. 9: Amazing Earth Adventure (ISBN 4334004601 Paperback: ISBN 4334786405)
- Brain Exercises Vol. 10 Welcome to the Galactic Adventure Tour (ISBN 4334004733 Paperback: ISBN 4334786596)
- Brain Exercises Vol. 11 Dream Super Baseball Puzzle (ISBN 4334004873)
- Brain Exercises Vol. 12: Welcome to the Brain Endurance Rally (ISBN 4334004970)
- Brain Exercises Vol. 13: Puzzle Olympics (ISBN 4334005101)
- Brain Exercises Vol. 14: Explore the Wonders of the World (ISBN 4334005241)
- Brain Exercises Vol. 15 Challenge! Brain World Cup (ISBN 4334005381)
- Brain Exercises Vol. 16: Aim to be a Super-Creative Iron Man! (ISBN 4334005527)
- Brain Exercises Vol. 17 Special: Invitation to the Mysterious Mansion (ISBN 4334005608)
- Brain Exercises Vol. 18: Labyrinth Psychology: Challenge Yourself to Become a Great Detective (ISBN 4334005713)
- Brain Exercises Vol. 19: Brain Modification: Escape from the Demon Palace (ISBN 4334005934)
- Brain Exercises Vol. 20: A Midsummer Night's Dream (ISBN 4334006337)
- Brain Exercises Vol. 21: The Biggest Ever! Fascinating Magic Puzzle (ISBN 433400654X)
- Brain Exercises Vol. 22: Seven Ideas for Cyberspace (ISBN 4334006833)
- Brain Exercises Vol. 23: Eternal Mysteries (ISBN 4334007163)

Below are selected questions from the regular series:

- Brain Exercises Yotsuya Otsuka Best Selection: Launching the Brain Space Development Project! (ISBN 4334007597) — This is a collaboration with the Yotsuya Otsuka cram school, and the questions are designed with junior high school entrance exam questions in mind.
- Brain Teasers BEST (ISBN 9784334975852) — Contains 100 carefully selected questions from the regular series.
- Brain Teasers BEST 2 (ISBN 9784334976378) — The second edition of the best version with 100 carefully selected questions.

== Related Topics ==
- Comedy Exercises — A variety show hosted by Kyosen Ohashi that began two years after the first volume was released. (However, only the title was borrowed, and the quiz questions were not necessarily based on this book.)
- Tako Akira's Radio Brain Exercises — A mini-program on Nippon Broadcasting System based on this book.
