= List of books about Shinto =

This is a list of books that focus on the study of Shinto.

== General ==
- Hori, Ichiro (1994). Folk Religion in Japan: Continuity and Change. University of Chicago Press. ISBN 978-0226353340
- Evans, Ann Llewellyn (2002). Shinto Norito: A Book of Prayers. Trafford Publishing. ISBN 978-1553691389
- Littleton, C. Scott (2002). Understanding Shinto. Duncan Baird Publisher. ISBN 978-1844831999
- Hay, Jeff (2006). Shinto. Greenhaven Press, Detroit, Michigan. ISBN 978-0737725759
- Ono, Sokyo and William P. Woodard (2006). Shinto: The Kami Way. Tuttle Publishing. ISBN 978-0804835572
- Breen, John and Mark Teeuwen (2010). A New History of Shinto. Wiley-Blackwell. ISBN 978-1405155168
- Rankin, Aidan (2011). Shinto: A Celebration of Life. Mantra Books. ISBN 978-1846944383
- Yamakage, Motohisa (2012). The Essence of Shinto: Japan's Spiritual Heart. Kodansha International. ISBN 978-1568364377
- Imaizumi, Yoshiko. (2013). Sacred Space in the Modern City: The Fractured Pasts of Meiji Shrine, 1912-1958. Brill Publishers. ISBN 978-9004248199
- Hardacre, Helen (2016). Shinto: A History. Oxford University Press. ISBN 978-0190621711
- Miller, Vincent (2018). Shinto - The Way of Gods: Introduction to the Traditional Religion of Japan. CreateSpace Independent Publishing Platform. ISBN 978-1727065060

== Specialized ==
- Nelson, John K. (1996). A Year in the Life of a Shinto Shrine. University of Washington Press. ISBN 978-0295975009
- Cali, Joseph and John Dougill (2012). Shinto Shrines: A Guide to the Sacred Sites of Japan’s Ancient Religion. Latitude 20. ISBN 978-0824837136
- Heldt, Gustav (2014). The Kojiki: An Account of Ancient Matters. Columbia University Press. ISBN 978-0231163897

== Bloomsbury Shinto Studies ==
- Rambelli, Fabio. (2018). The Sea and the Sacred in Japan: Aspects of Maritime Religion. Bloomsbury Academic. ISBN 978-1350147645
- Rots, Aike P. (2019). Shinto, Nature and Ideology in Contemporary Japan: Making Sacred Forests. Bloomsbury Academic. ISBN 978-1350105911
