= The Otaku Encyclopedia =

Encyclopedia of anime, manga, and fandom topics

- Front cover of the book showing Moe-chan
- Author: Patrick W. Galbraith
- Language: English
- Subject: Otaku
- Genre: Encyclopedia
- Publisher: Kodansha
- Publication date: 2009
- Publication place: Japan
- Media type: Print (paperback)
- Pages: 248
- ISBN: 978-4-7700-3101-3
- OCLC: 318409815

The Otaku Encyclopedia is a 2009 encyclopedia written by Patrick Galbraith and published by Kodansha which provides an overview of anime and manga topics, and interviews and profiles of important people in Japanese fandom.

== Content ==
The Otaku Encyclopedia consists of some 600 entries on the subculture concerned with anime, manga, and video games, with 124 color pages and 150 photographs. Frederik L. Schodt provides a foreword to the book. A maid character called Moe-chan accompanies the reader through the book. In addition to entries about the subculture, the encyclopedia contains interviews with a dozen different notable people. Kaichirō Morikawa who is an author, and lecturer at Meiji University talks about the otaku culture of Akihabara. Anime director Yutaka Yamamoto talks about anime in general which include its fans and ones he has directed. As one of the main organizers of Comiket, Koichi Ichikawa talks about the doujinshi fair, including what lies ahead. Author Yunmao Ayakawa known for working as a journalist, and cosplayer, talks about cosplay and what got her into it. Bishojo model figurine sculptor BOME talks about and describes his career in model making. Expert gamer Haruna Anno, who has been dubbed as "Queen of Retro games" in Tokyo, talks about how otaku and gamers relate to one another as well as how she got into gaming. Singer Himeko Sakuragawa known for her single "Goin' to Akiba" talks about her life as an Idoru, and her experience with Akihabara.

A list of recommended anime, video games, and Tokusatsu appears at the end of the book.

Interviews

- Hitomi
- Ako Hazuki
- Toshio Okada
- Takashi Murakami
- Shoko Nakagawa

== Development ==
Galbraith regards the book as being needed due to media coverage of Tsutomu Miyazaki informing people about Japanese fandom.

== Reception ==
Scott Green regards The Otaku Encyclopedia as not being "disposable criticism". Mark Schilling, writing for The Japan Times, regards the encyclopedia's goal as being to "supply facts about the objects of obsession, while opening windows into the mysterious culture that produced them", saying that the book does not have enough "critical distance or analysis". Brian Ruh feels that although the book tries to be broad in its scope, it is written from a fan perspective and shows that Galbraith is primarily a "moe otaku".
