= Tadao Tominari =

Japanese photographer

Tadao Tominari (冨成 忠夫, Tominari Tadao, 1919–1992) was a Japanese nature photographer.

== Life and career ==
Tominari was born on August 17, 1919, in Shimonoseki, Yamaguchi Prefecture. Graduating in 1942 from Tōkyō Bijutsu Gakkō (東京美術学校, now Tokyo University of the Arts), by the 1960s he had begun to specialize in plant photography. He also painted.

In 1975 Tominari established a photography company in Sendagaya, Tokyo. For the following three years he photographed for an encyclopedia, published by Asahi Shinbun-sha, of the plants of the world: Asahi hyakka: Sekai no shokubutsu. He contributed to fifty photographically illustrated guides to plants and similar works. He was awarded the 1990 Japan Picture Book Awards Grand Prize for his photo collection Fuyume Gasshodan (ふゆめがっしょうだん). He died at the age of 73 on September 25, 1992, in Tokyo.

== Collections ==
Seventeen of Tominari's photographs are in the collection of the Tokyo Metropolitan Museum of Photography.

== Books with photography by Tominari ==
- Hana no techō: No no hana (花の手帖 野の花). Tokyo: Kodansha, 1968. Photography by Tominari.
- Kisetsu no hana: Utsukushii hana no miryoku (季節の花 美しい花の魅力). Tokyo: Jitsugyō-no-Nihon-sha, 1968.
- Nihon no kaboku (日本の花木). Tokyo: Kodansha, 1971. Photography by Tominari.
- Gendai tsubaki-shū: Tominari Tadao shashin (現代椿集 富成忠夫写真). Tokyo: Kodansha, 1972.
- Tsutsuji, satsuki, shakunage (躑躅・皐月・石楠花). Tokyo: Kodansha, 1974. Photography by Tominari.
- Genshoku sansai (原色・山菜). Tokyo: Ie-no-hikari Kyōkai, 1974. Photography by Tominari.
- No no kusa to ki to (野の草と木と). Tokyo: Yama-to-keikoku-sha, 1978. ISBN 4635586014. By Tominari.
- Kiyose: Kusaki hana (季寄せ 草木花). 7 vols. Tokyo: Asahi Shinbunsha, 1979–80. Photography by Tominari.
- 1982-ki (1982季). Tokyo: Tokyo Editorial Center, 1982. ISBN 4-635-58602-2. By Tominari.
- Kigi hyakkasen (木々百花撰). Tokyo: Asahi Shinbun-sha, 1989. ISBN 4-02-256008-8. Photography by Tominari.
- Fuyume gashōdan (ふゆめがっしょうだん). Tokyo: Fukuinkan Shoten, 1990. ISBN 4-8340-1020-1. Co-photographed by Tominari.
- Neichā wārudo: Chikyū ni ikiru (ネイチャー・ワールド：地球に生きる) / Nature World: Life on Earth. Tokyo: Tokyo Metropolitan Museum of Photography, 1997. Catalogue of an exhibition of the work of various photographers, with texts and captions in Japanese and English.
