= Ryujin Kiyoshi =

Japanese singer and songwriter (born 1989)

Ryujin Kiyoshi (清 竜人)
- Born: 27 May 1989 (age 37)
- Origin: Yodogawa-ku, Osaka, Japan
- Genres: J-Pop, folk
- Occupation: Singer-songwriter
- Instruments: Guitar, piano
- Years active: 2008–present
- Label: EMI Music Japan
- Website: kiyoshiryujin.com

Ryujin Kiyoshi (清 竜人, Kiyoshi Ryūjin; born 27 May 1989) is a Japanese singer-songwriter. He debuted as a major label artist in 2009, with the single "Morning Sun" and is also known for writing Yui Horie's 2011 single "Immoralist". In 2023, his song "Haruka" was used as an opening theme for the anime Dr. Stone.

== Life and career ==
=== Beginnings ===
Kiyoshi was born in 1989, and grew up in Osaka. At 15 he began to write his own music, and in the summer of 2005 produced demo recordings, which he sent to many music record personnel, beginning his musical career. In 2006, Kiyoshi competed at the Teens Rock high school band music competition and won the grand prize, which led to his appearance at the Rock in Japan Festival summer festival in 2006, as one of his prizes.

=== Debut with Philosophy ===
In 2008, Kiyoshi released his first song commercially before being signed to a record label, with the song "Send" featured on the film Cyborg She's soundtrack. He debuted officially in 2009 under EMI Music Japan with the song "Morning Sun," which was used in a commercial campaign for cellphone provider AU. Kiyoshi released his debut album Philosophy later in the month. The album was awarded a runner up award in the 2010 second CD Shop Awards.

=== World and People ===
In 2010 Kiyoshi released his second album, World, led by the singles "Help Me Help Me Help Me" and "Itai yo." After the release of the album, Kiyoshi held his first major tour across Japan. In 2011, a song written by Kiyoshi, "Immortalist," was released by voice actress Yui Horie, and was used as the theme song for the animation Dragon Crisis!. The song became a top 10 single on Oricon's singles chart. Two months later, Kiyoshi released his third album, People. In 2025, he contributed to the original soundtrack of the Netflix original series Glass Heart.

== Discography ==
=== Albums ===
Year	Album information	Chart positions	Total sales
2009	Philosophy: Released: 25 March 2009; Label: EMI Music Japan (TOCT-26734); Formats: CD, digital download, rental CD	38	9,100
2010	World: Released: 17 February 2010; Label: EMI Music Japan (TOCT-26934); Formats: CD, digital download, rental CD	20	11,100
2011	People: Released: 13 April 2011; Label: EMI Music Japan (TOCT-27063); Formats: CD, digital download, rental CD	29	5,300
2012	Music: Released: 9 May 2012; Label: EMI Music Japan (TOCT-28079); Formats: CD, digital download, rental CD	37	

=== Singles ===
Release	Title	Notes	Chart positions			Oricon sales	Album
Release	Title	Notes	Oricon singles charts	Billboard Japan Hot 100	RIAJ digital tracks	Oricon sales	Album
2009	"Morning Sun"		43	5	—	3,800	Philosophy
2009	"John L. Fly no Uso" (ジョン・L・フライの嘘, Jon Eru Furai no Uso; "The Lies of John L. Fly")	Digital single	—	—	—	—	Philosophy
2009	"Help Me Help Me Help Me" (ヘルプミーヘルプミーヘルプミー, Herupu Mī Herupu Mī Herupu Mī)		82	39	—	1,300	World
2010	"Itai yo" (痛いよ; "It Hurts")		55	17	49	2,500	World
2010	"Mademoiselle" (マドモアゼル, Madomoazeru)	Digital single	—	—	—	—	World
2010	"Bokura wa Tsunagatteru n da na" (ぼくらはつながってるんだな; "'Cause We're All Connected")		43	21	—	2,600	People
2010	"Please Repeat After Me" (プリーズリピートアフターミー, Purīzu Ripīto Afutā Mī)		64	58	—	2,600	People
2011	"Boy and Girl Love Song" (ボーイ・アンド・ガール・ラヴ・ソング, Boi ando Gāru Rabu Songu)		48	53	—	2,400	People
2011	"Gakincho no Uta" (がきんちょのうた; "Little Brats Song")	Digital single	—	—	—	—	People

=== Other charted songs ===
Release	Title	Chart positions		Album
Release	Title	Billboard Japan Hot 100	RIAJ digital tracks	Album
2010	"World" (ワールド, Wārudo)	73	—	World

=== DVDs ===
Year	Title
2012	Kiyoshi Ryujin MUSIC SHOW

== Music videos ==
Director	Title
Alex Profit	Bokura wa Tsunagatterun da na
Ishii Yuuya	Homo sapiens wa Uta wo Utau
Ichimura Hayato	All My Life
Ootsubo Soujirou	Itai yo (LIVE@SHIBUYA-AX)
groovisions	Zipangu
Kurokawa Shizuka	Boy and Girl Love Song
Kojima Junji	Please Repeat After Me
Nakagawa Migiwa	Uso no Koi
Fujiyasu Hirohito	Help Me Help Me Help Me
Morimoto Mie	Itai yo
Unknown	Morning Sun

== Awards ==
Year	Nominee / work	Award	Result
2006	Kiyoshi Ryujin	Teens Rock in Hitachinaka 2006	Won
2009	"Morning Sun"	FM Festival "Life Music Award 2009" Best Voice of Life	Nominated
2009	"Morning Sun"	FM Festival "Life Music Award 2009" Best New Artist of Life	Nominated
2010	Philosophy	The Second CD Shop Awards	Silver
2010	"Help Me Help Me Help Me"	Space Shower Music Video Awards 2010 Best New Artist Video	Nominated
