= Ho?: Horie Yui Character Best Album =

Ho?

Compilation album by Yui Horie
- Released: March 26, 2003
- Recorded: ?
- Genre: J-pop
- Length: ?:?
- Label: Star Child
- Producer: Toshimichi Otsuki, Sakumi Matsuda and Atsushi Moriyama

Yui Horie chronology
| Kuroneko to Tsuki Kikyū o Meguru Bōken (2001) | Ho? (2003) | sky (2003) |

Ho?: Horie Yui Character Best Album, also known as ほっ？ (Ho?), is a compilation album by Yui Horie released in 2004. It features songs from various Japanese anime shows, including music from Love Hina and Fruits Basket. It also has exclusive new versions of the Love Hina songs "Sakura saku" and "Itsumademo dokomademo".

== Track listing ==
1. "Pinch"
2. "My Best Friend"
3. "Dear Mama"
4. "Sora no Yō ni…" (空のように...; lit. 'Like the Sky...')
5. "Heart wa Uragaeshi" (ハートはうらがえし; lit. 'My Heart is Upside Down')
6. "Koko de Yokatta ne" (ここで良かったね; lit. 'Isn't It Great to Be Here?')
7. "Destiny"
8. "Girlish"
9. "Haru da Mono!" (春だもの!; lit. 'Because it's Spring!') (Naru Narusegawa version)
10. "Girlish"
11. "For Fruits Basket" (For フルーツバスケット)
12. "Chiisa na Inori" (小さな祈り; lit. 'A Little Prayer')
13. "Kirari Takaramono" (キラリ☆宝物; lit. 'Sparkling Treasure')
14. "Be for You, Be for Me"
15. "Sono Saki no Justice" (その先のJustice; lit. 'That Justice Just Now')
16. "In You"
17. "Aosusuki" (青薄; lit. 'Green eulalia grass')
18. "Sakura Saku" (サクラサク; lit. 'Cherry Blossoms Bloom') (Ho? version)
19. "Itsumademo Dokomademo" (イツマデモドコマデモ; lit. 'Forever, Anywhere') (Ho? version)
