= World End no Niwa =

- Standard Edition

Studio album by Yui Horie
- Released: January 7, 2015
- Genre: J-pop
- Length: 52:19
- Language: Japanese
- Label: Star Child Records

Yui Horie chronology
Himitsu (2012)	World End no Niwa (2015)

Singles from End World no Niwa
- 1. "Stand Up!" Released: March 4, 2015

World End no Niwa (ワールドエンドの庭) is the ninth album by Yui Horie. It was released on January 7, 2015, as a standard edition and two First Press limited editions, that came in a Red or Blue variation.

Album covers and insert photo booklets were shot in England, with the location having been decided before music production had even began. The focus of the shoot was heritage buildings and castles. As a result of this decision, Gothic, Classic and Mysterious elements were purposely included within the musical composition. This was in addition to the "strange mood" musical stylings of previous collaborator Ryujin Kiyoshi, which was seen as complementary to their intended art direction.

The album achieved a peak position of fifth in the Oricon Charts, staying in the chart for seven weeks.

== Track listing ==
1. プロローグ ～edge of the unknown～ (Prologue -Edge of the Unknown-)
  - Lyrics: Yamazaki Hiroko. Composition & Arrangement: Okawa Shigenobu
2. The♥World’s♥End
  - Lyrics, Composition & Arrangement: Ryujin Kiyoshi
  - 2nd opening theme song for Golden Time
3. Stand Up!
  - Lyrics: Masumi Asano. Composition & Arrangement: Okawa Shigenobu
  - Theme song for the game White Cat Project (iOS & Android)
4. Happy End
  - Lyrics: Kawada Ruka. Composition & Arrangement: Tak Miyazawa
5. Sweet & Sweet CHERRY
  - Lyrics: YUKACO. Composition & Arrangement: Kohei by SIMONSAYZ. String Arrangement: Hasegawa Tomoki
  - Ending theme song for Golden Time
6. ミステリー... (Mystery...)
  - Lyrics, Composition & Arrangement: Ryujin Kiyoshi
7. 半永久的に愛してよ♥ (Haneikyuu Teki ni Aishite yo)
  - Lyrics, Composition & Arrangement: Ryujin Kiyoshi
  - 2nd ending theme song for Golden Time
8. ほんのちょっと (Honno Chotto)
  - Lyrics, Composition & Arrangement: Kawada Ruka
9. Golden Time
  - Lyrics: Yoshida Shiori. Composition & Arrangement: Kohei by SIMONSAYZ
  - Opening theme song for Golden Time
10. この場所で (Kono Basho De)
  - Lyrics: Yoshida Shiori. Composition: SHIKI. Arrangement: Okawa Shigenobu
  - Theme of the OVA "Mitsuwano" (みツわの)
11. Innocent Note
  - Lyrics & Composition: Miyazaki Mayu.Arrangement: Hisashi Asano
12. Girl Friend
  - Lyrics, Composition & Arrangement: Ryujin Kiyoshi
13. Garden
  - Lyrics, Composition & Arrangement: Yamazaki Hiroko
