= Himitsu (Yui Horie album) =

- Standard Edition

Studio album by Yui Horie
- Released: February 22, 2012
- Genre: J-pop
- Length: 59:23
- Language: Japanese
- Label: Star Child Records

Yui Horie chronology
Honey Jet!!! (2009)	Himitsu (2012)	World End no Niwa (2015)

Spring-Summer Limited Edition

Singles from Himitsu
- 1. "YAHHO !!" Released: August 26, 2009; 2. "Immoralist (インモラリスト)" Released: February 2, 2011; 3. "PRESENTER" Released: May 25, 2011; 4. "Coloring" Released: January 18, 2012

Himitsu (秘密) is the eighth album by Yui Horie. It was released on February 22, 2012, as a standard edition and two limited editions, that came in a "Spring-Summer" or "Winter" variation.

The album achieved a peak position of third in the Oricon Charts, staying in the chart for six weeks.

== Track listing ==
1. 秘密～プロローグ～ (Himitsu ~Prologue~)
2. kiss to you
3. Coloring
  - Ending theme song for Listen to Me, Girls. I Am Your Father!
4. True truly love
  - Theme song for the online game Divina (defunct as of November 2014)
5. 秘密～君を見てた～ (Himitsu-Kimi wo Miteta-)
6. イマカラキミノモトヘ (Ima Kara Kimi no Moto he)
7. PRESENTER
  - Ending theme for song anime Dog Days
8. インモラリスト (Immoralist)
  - Opening theme song for anime Dragon Crisis!
9. MISSION
10. DEAR FUTURE
  - Ending theme song for anime Penguindrum - Episode 10
11. CHILDISH♥LOVE♥WORLD
12. YAHHO!!
  - Ending theme song for anime Kanamemo
13. sky fish
14. 秘密～待ち合わせ～ (Himitsu ~Machiawase~)
