= Sakura Saku =

2000 single by Megumi Hayashibara

Single by Megumi Hayashibara

from the album Feel Well
- Language: Japanese
- B-side: "Kimi Sae Ireba"
- Released: May 24, 2000
- Genre: J-pop; anime song
- Length: 3:13
- Label: Starchild
- Songwriter: Ritsuko Okazaki

Megumi Hayashibara singles chronology
"Booska! Booska!!" (1999)	"Sakura Saku" (2000)	"Unsteady" (2000)

Audio
- "Sakura Saku" on YouTube

"Sakura Saku (サクラサク; lit. 'Cherry Blossoms Bloom')" is a song by Japanese voice actress and recording artist Megumi Hayashibara. Written by Ritsuko Okazaki, the song was released as a single on May 24, 2000, via Starchild. The song served as opening theme for the television anime series Love Hina. For the single release, the song was coupled with "Kimi Sae Ireba", which was used as ending theme for the same series.

== Background and release ==
Producer Toshimichi Otsuki, then with King Records, specifically commissioned Ritsuko Okazaki for both lyrics and music early in the project's development. When explaining what he wanted for the theme song, Okazawaki shared his personal imagined story concept for the series to Okazaki, rather than sharing the source material of Lone Hina: in his vision, protagonist Keitaro Urashima falls into a coma following a suicide attempt, and during the course of the series an increasing numbers of elderly figures from the world of the dead attempt to guide him back to the land of the living. Through these dreams, Keitaro comprehends the meaning of life and awakens determined to live, surrounded by the real residents of Hinata Inn. Okazaki was reportedly deeply moved by this pitch, which directly influenced the creation of both the opening "Sakura Saku" and the ending theme "Kimi Sae Ireba." Megumi Hayashibara, who voices the role of Haruka Urashima in the series, was commissioned to provide vocals for both songs. Hayashibara and Okazaki shared a professional connection and friendship with Okazaki until her passing in 2004; Okazaki had written several songs for her since early in her career.

The single was released on May 24, 2000, as the first single by Hayashibara on 12-cm maxi single format. Both songs had their first album appearance as the short versions used on TV on the soundtrack album Love Hina Original Sound File released on September 21, 2000, while the full-length versions were first included on the compilation album Love Hina: Hinata Girls Song Best released on March 16, 2001. "Sakura Saku" was subsequently included on Hayashibara's studio album Feel Well released on June 26, 2002. "Kimi Sae Ireba" was then included on the album Center Color released on January 7, 2004.

== Concepts and themes ==
"Sakura Saku" has been described as an atypical cherry blossom-themed song, due to its departure from the common romantic associations typically linked to the motif. "Sakura Saku" is an uplifting encouragement song which celebrates living, standing out within Megumi Hayashibara's discography due to its particularly poppy and energetic feel.

== Commercial performance ==
"Sakura Saku" debuted and peaked at number 7 on the Oricon charts, and selling 64,660 copies on its first week. It charted for seven weeks in total, with cumulative reported sales amounting to 104,500.

The single was certified gold by the Recording Industry Association of Japan in October 2003.

== Cover versions ==
Okazaki recorded self-cover versions of "Sakura Saku" and "Kimi Sae Ireba" in 2001, which were included on her album Love Hina Okazaki Collection. Additionally, the song has been covered by Love Hina voice actors Yūji Ueda, Yui Horie and Satsuki Yukino; (Note: Yui Horie later recorded her own solo version of the song on her album Ho?: Horie Yui Character Best Album released in 2003.) as well as by Erina Nakashima, Mikuni Shimokawa, and Lyrical Lily.

== Track listing ==
All tracks are written by Ritsuko Okazaki.

CD single/digital release track listing
No.	Title	Arrangement	Length
1.	"Sakura Saku" (サクラサク)	Tomoji Sogawa	3:13
2.	"Kimi Sae Ireba" (君さえいれば, lit. 'If Only You Were Here')	Sogawa	4:12
3.	"Sakura Saku" (off vocal version)		3:13
4.	"Kimi Sae Ireba"" (off vocal version)		4:11

== Charts ==
=== Weekly charts ===
Weekly chart performance for "Sakura Saku"
Chart (2000)	Peak position
Japan (Oricon)	7

=== Year-end charts ===
Year-end chart performance for "Sakura Saku"
Chart (2000)	Position
Japan (Oricon)	190

== Certifications ==
Region	Certification	Certified units/sales
Japan (RIAJ)	Gold	100,000^{^}
^{^} Shipments figures based on certification alone.
