= Mizutamari ni Utsuru Sekai =

Studio album by Yui Horie
- Released: December 21, 2000
- Genre: J-pop
- Length: 54:44
- Label: Star Child Records
- Producer: Toshimichi Otsuki, Sakumi Matsuda and Atsushi Moriyama

Yui Horie chronology
Mizutamari ni Utsuru Sekai (2000)	Kuroneko to Tsuki Kikyū o Meguru Bōken (2001)

Mizutamari ni Utsuru Sekai (水たまりに映るセカイ) —The world reflected in a puddle— is Yui Horie's first solo album with mostly original content but also featuring versions of the Love Hina songs "Yakusoku" and "Happy Happy Rice Shower". It peaked at number 28 on Oricon Albums Chart.

== Track listing ==
1. 桜
  (Sakura, Cherry blossom)
2. Insistence
3. おはよう
  (Ohayō, Good morning)
4. ラブリー
  (Raburii, Lovely)
5. 着心地の悪い恋なんて
  (Kigokochi no warui koi nante, I don't need love, it's uncomfortable to wear)
6. 約束 ~eternal promise~
  (Yakusoku, Promise)
7. 洗濯機の中から
  (Sentakuki no naka kara, From the inside of a washing machine)
8. 愛のカタチ
  (Ai no katachi, The shape of love)
9. スコールクロール
  (Sukōru Kurōru, Squall crawl)
10. Happy happy rice shower - type Yui
11. I wish
12. Happy love to you
