= Ho-Kago Tea Time =

2009 mini album by After School Tea Time

EP by Hokago Tea Time
- Released: July 22, 2009
- Genres: J-POP; Anime songs Character songs Girl bands
- Length: 31:28 (Disc-1: 15:33 seconds) (Disc-2: 15:49 seconds)
- Label: Pony Canyon
- Producers: Shigeo Komori（F.M.F） Atsushi Isoyama; Mariko Okamoto; Pony Canyon

Hokago Tea Time chronology
Ho-Kago Tea Time (2009)	After School Tea Time II (2010)

Ho-Kago Tea Time is the first mini-album by Ho-Kago Tea Time ("After School Tea Time"), a band from the TV anime “K-ON!”. It was released by Pony Canyon on July 22, 2009.

== Overview ==
This mini-album features the band “After School Tea Time,” consisting of the four members of the fictional Sakuragaoka High School Light Music Club, Yui Hirasawa (voiced by Aoi Toyosaki), Mio Akiyama (voiced by Yoko Hikasa), Ritsu Tainaka (voiced by Satomi Satō), and Tsumugi Kotobuki (voiced by Minako Kotobuki).

The band name “After School Tea Time,” which is also the album title, was decided in the anime just before the second-year school festival (original volume 2, p. 74; anime episode 11). (Note: Previously released songs (“Cagayake! GIRLS,” “Don't say ‘lazy’,” and “Fuwa Fuwa Time”) are credited under the name “Sakuragaoka High School Light Music Club.”) This work is a two-disc set containing both the Studio Mix and Live Mix versions. As a first-press limited edition, it includes a glittery outer box and full-song melody sheets for one chorus of every track.

While all songs featured in the series are credited in-story as having lyrics written by Mio Akiyama and music composed by Tsumugi Kotobuki, the actual lyrics and arrangements were written and arranged by real life individuals. (Note: Some of the lyrics of "Fuwa Fuwa Time" are taken directly from the original story. The lyrics in the story were written by the original author, Kakifly.)

Disc 3 of the "K-ON! Music History's Box," which released on March 20, 2013, compiles “Disc-1 (Studio Mix)” and “Disc-2 (Live Mix)” from this album.

== Chart performance ==
According to Oricon's tally, After School Tea Time ranked No. 1 on the daily chart on July 21, 2009, which was the day before its release, and then remained at the top for five consecutive days until the daily chart on July 25 of the same year.It debuted at number one on the weekly chart dated August 3, 2009, and as a CD released under an anime character's name, it became the first album in Oricon chart history to achieve this feat.

The Recording Industry Association of Japan announced that this album was Gold certified in July 2009. This marks the third CD related to “K-ON!” to receive Gold certification, following “Cagayake! GIRLS” and “Don't say ‘lazy’”. For full-length songs, the version of “Fuwa Fuwa Time” included on this album received Gold certification for December 2012.

Marty Friedman, a guitarist living in Japan and former member of the American rock band Megadeth, mentioned K-ON! and this CD in his column “Marty Friedman's J-POP Metal Review” in the October 2009 issue of "Nikkei Entertainment!". He wrote, "In America, 30 years ago, a band called The Archies became popular, born from the show 'It's the Archies!' I think the Archies that exist within the anime are a mysterious presence that makes you want to root for them. I think people in Japan who are hooked on ‘K-ON!’ right now feel the same way.“ Regarding the music, he analyzed the first track, ”Curry Then Rice,“ saying, ”If you remove the voice actor's vocals and the organ part, it's just a cool hard rock-style pop punk song, but the vocals are so baby-like you'd think an 8-year-old girl was singing, and the fact that the lyrics are about curry rice is shocking. Lyrics about food are unheard of in Western rock music; it's something only Japan, with its world-class food culture, could produce."

== Personnel ==
- Aki Toyosaki
- Yoko Hikasa
- Satomi Satō
- Minako Kotobuki
- Ayana Taketatsu

== Track listing ==
=== Disc-1（Studio Mix） ===
CD／digital download／streaming
No.	Title	Lyrics	Music	Lead vocals	Length
1.	"Curry Then Rice" ( (Note: Composition & Arrangement: Hiroyuki Maezawa A baked curry bread (medium spicy) inspired by this song was released by Yamazaki Baking during a fair held at Lawson stores starting May 10, 2011.))	Emi Inaba		Yui Hirasawa (5-member lineup)	3:16
2.	"My Love Is a Stapler" ( (Note: Arrangement: Gen Momoi In the first episode of the anime's second season, a humming version performed by Yui was used. This version was released on CD as a campaign prize for purchasers of the DVD/Blu-ray Disc Volume 5 of the anime's second season, titled “After School Tea Time II,” and was mailed to all applicants. Note that it was originally planned to be sent to 10,000 winners.))	Emi Inaba	Itsuki Fujisue	Yui Hirasawa & Mio Akiyama (5-member lineup)	4:24
3.	"Fude Pen ~Ballpoint Pen~" ( (Note: Composition & Arrangement: Susumu Kawaguchi))	Emi Inaba		Yui Hirasawa (5-member lineup)	3:57
4.	"Fuwa Fuwa Time" ( (Note: Composition & Arrangement: Hiroyuki Maezawa This version features a different main vocalist from the previously released single version and includes an additional second guitar part. Used as the CM song for the PSP game software “K-ON! After School Live!!” (15-second version) and as the CM song for Houbunsha's Manga Time KR Comics “K-ON!”.))	Mio Akiyama		Yui Hirasawa (5-member lineup)	3:56
Total length:					15:33

=== Disc-2（Live Mix） ===
CD／digital download／streaming
No.	Title	Lead vocals	Length
1.	"Curry Then Rice (#8 “Welcome Party!” Mix)"	Yui Hirasawa	3:18
2.	"My Love Is a Stapler (#8 “Welcome Party!” Mix)"	Yui Hirasawa (Opening only: Mio Akiyama)	4:28
3.	"Fude Pen ~Ballpoint Pen~ (#12 “K-On!” Mix)"	Mio Akiyama	3:58
4.	"Fuwa Fuwa Time (#12 “K-On!” Mix)"	Yui Hirasawa	4:05
Total length:			15:49

== Charts ==
=== Year-end charts ===
Year-end performance for Ho-Kago Tea Time
Chart (2009)	Peak position
2009 Annual Ranking (Oricon)	75
SoundScan	1
Billboard Japan Hot 100	1
CDTV	1
Music Station	9
Amazon.co.jp, Best of Music 2009 Anime Category	6

=== Monthly charts ===
Weekly chart performance for Ho-Kago Tea Time
Chart (2009)	Peak position
August 2009 Monthly Ranking (Oricon)	5

=== Weekly charts ===
Weekly chart performance for Ho-Kago Tea Time
Chart (2009)	Peak position
Weekly (Oricon)	1
Weekly (Planet)	1

=== Daily charts ===
Daily chart performance for Ho-Kago Tea Time
Chart (2009)	Peak position
Daily (Oricon)	1
Daily (Planet)	1

== Certifications ==
Certifications for Ho-Kago Tea Time
Region	Certification	Certified units/sales
Japan (RIAJ)	Gold	100,000^{^}
^{^} Shipments figures based on certification alone.

== Awards ==
Awards and nominations for "Ho-Kago Tea Time"
Ceremony	Year	Award	Result
4th Seiyu Awards	2010	Best Musical Performance	Won
