= Love Destiny (song) =

Single by Yui Horie
- B-side: Tsubasa (翼); Sweet Baby Love
- Released: May 16, 2001
- Genre: J-pop
- Length: 29:43
- Label: Starchild
- Songwriters: Satomi Arimori (有森聡美); Chinatsu Ito (伊藤千夏); Mio Okada (岡田実音)

Yui Horie singles chronology
"brand-new communication" (1999)	"Love Destiny" (2001)	"Kirari☆Takaramono" (2002)

Love Destiny is the third single album by Yui Horie. It was released on May 16, 2001, by the label Starchild. Two tracks, "Love Destiny" and "Tsubasa" (翼) were used in the first season of the anime series, Sister Princess as well as their alternative versions were used in Horie Yui's album Kuroneko to Tsuki Kikyū o Meguru Bōken.

== Legacy ==
The titular song, Love Destiny, was rumored to be the "anthem" of the company, ASCII Media Works, that owns the Sister Princess franchise; as mentioned by Yui Horie in the company-sponsored entertainment event called DENGEKI MUSIC LIVE!!.

Former AKB48 singer Mayu Watanabe cited Love Destiny as her inspiration to be interested in anime according to a joint interview with Yui Horie.

== Track listing ==
No.	Title	Lyrics	Length
1.	"Love Destiny"	Chinatsu Ito (伊藤千夏)	4:33
2.	"Tsubasa (翼)"	Satomi Arimori (有森聡美)	4:39
3.	"Sweet Baby Love"	Mio Okada (岡田実音)	5:40
4.	"Love Destiny （instrumental）"		4:33
5.	"翼 （instrumental）"		4:39
6.	"Sweet Baby Love （Off Vocal）"		5:39
