= Unscandal =

UNSCANDAL
- Origin: , Japan
- Genres: Rock, ska, Funk
- Years active: 1990–present
- Website: www.unscandal.com

UNSCANDAL is a rock band based in Tokyo, Japan. The band currently consists of 4 members. UNSCANDAL currently mainly performs live in the Kantō region of Japan. The band is most well known for performing the theme music for the anime School Rumble. UNSCANDAL performed as part of a promotional concert in December 2004 in School Rumble Presents Come! Come! Welcome? Party for School Rumble alongside Yui Horie. The concert was released on DVD in 2005.

== Lineup ==
- Takayuki Suzu-ki – vocals, trumpet
- Kanpey Hakama – bass
- Jackey Amano – drums
- kozzz – guitar

"UNSCANDAL Profiles". unscandal.com.

== History ==
UNSCANDAL was formed by Takayuki Suzu-ki in Tokyo in July, 1990. Hybrid brass rock bands by the Japanese crazy men. Funk, Latin, ska, punk mixture... They go back and forth with the various music genres and utter happy music all over the world.

The first maxi single CD "UNSCANDAL UNO" was released in September, 1999 from independent label. In spring, 2003, they supported the recording of album "POP" of LÄ-PPISCH. Gajiro Satoh performed in a live tour in Japan of LÄ-PPISCH as a support trombone player. UNSCANDAL also performed as a front act.

Their song "SCRAMbLE" was used as the opening theme of the anime School Rumble and was released as "Yui Horie with UNSCANDAL" in October 2004. This song got the thirteenth place in Japanese music chart "ORICON."

In February 2005, the 2nd album CD "UNSCANDAL" was released from KING RECORDS. The music "GORI-LLA" which was in this album was used for an ending theme music of movie "Sakigake! Cromartie highschool the movie."

They currently mainly perform live in the Tokyo and Kantō region of Japan. "UNSCANDAL History". Myspace.com.

== Discography ==
Singles

- UNSCANDAL UNO (1999)
- STRIKE (2000)
- PUSH UP (2001)
- 1.2.3!!! (2003)
- Forca! (2008)

Albums

- UNSCANDAL a GO!!!!!!!(2000)
- UNSCANDAL (2005)
- Sweet (2006)
