= Usotsuki Alice to Kujiragō o Meguru Bōken =

Studio album by Yui Horie
- Released: November 23, 2005
- Recorded: ?
- Genre: J-pop
- Length: 55:43
- Label: Star Child Records
- Producer: Toshimichi Otsuki, Sakumi Matsuda and Atsushi Moriyama

Yui Horie chronology
Rakuen (2004)	Usotsuki Alice to Kujiragō o Meguru Bōken (2005)	Darling (2008)

Usotsuki Alice to Kujiragō o Meguru Bōken (嘘つきアリスとくじら号をめぐる冒険, Usotsuki Arisu to Kujiragō o Meguru Bōken) is the fifth album by Yui Horie.

== Track listing ==
1. "はじまりの唄" (Hajimari no Uta, A starting song)
2. "マッシュルームマーチ" (MASSHURUUMU MAACHI, Mushroom March)
3. "世界中の愛を言葉にして" (Sekai juu no ai wo kotoba ni shite, Turning the world's love into words)
4. "蒼い森" (Aoi Mori, Blue forest)
5. "Shiny merry-go-round"
6. "くじら光線" (Kujira Kousen, Whale light beam)
7. "Puzzle"
8. "いつか" (Itsuka, someday)
9. "day by day"
10. "スクランブル" (SUKURANBURU, Scramble)
11. "LET'S GO!!"
12. "Will"
13. "口笛" (Kuchibue, Whistle)
