= Naru Narusegawa =

- Love Hina character
- Created by: Ken Akamatsu
- Voiced by: Japanese; Yui Horie; English; Dorothy Elias-Fahn

In-universe information
- Significant other: Keitaro Urashima

Naru Narusegawa (Japanese: 成瀬川 なる, Hepburn: Narusegawa Naru) is a fictional character in the Love Hina series by Ken Akamatsu and one of the central characters in the franchise. Known for her fiery temper and tendency to use physical violence to punish central character Keitaro Urashima, she is the first female introduced in the series. She is trying to pass the University of Tokyo entrance exams. Her studies along with her developing relationship with Keitaro is one of the focal points in the series. Her Japanese voice actress is Yui Horie and her English voice actor is Dorothy Elias-Fahn. While her character was initially rated positively in fan polls, reviews have since been negative due to her "abusive behavior" towards Keitaro.

== Character design ==
Ken Akamatsu initially designed a character named Midori who would later become the basis for Naru. Her appearance was identical to Naru with the exception of the signature hair antennae. Midori was to be the complete opposite of Naru in character, acting very kind and nice like Mutsumi in personality. Upon first encountering the main character she was to fall naked from the ceiling on top of him, losing her memory in the process. Because of her amnesia, not much is known about her past. She stays with the main character who instantly falls in love with her, and gets a part-time job as a waitress yet due to her clumsiness she's prone to tripping and falling while carrying food.

Some of the sketches of Midori's facial expressions and outfits were still used for Naru in the anime. Before finalizing her design and description, her character was renamed multiple times before the start of the series. In particular, her eyes were worked on the most to match her personality.

== Appearances ==
=== Manga ===
Manga illustration of Naru at her wedding

At the start of the story, Naru is a 17-year-old student and resident of Hinata Inn. She came to live there when she was just in junior high. Naru is characterized by her signature hair antenna (which is only shared by one other character in the series, Mutsumi), short and hot temper, immense strength and agility despite her size, and physically aggressive nature when it comes to Keitaro. Because of this, Naru is described as being "one fuse short of a cannon". This side of her is usually reserved for Keitaro. The other residents of Hinata Inn, of whom she is protective, care for Naru like a sister. She is reliable and responsible. They all cheer her on and support her during her studies. As the story progresses, the girls become envious of Naru, because of her beauty and most importantly because of her relationship with Keitaro. Some are driven to the point where they start to dress and act like her. Despite attempts to break them apart, the girls eventually see Naru as a role model to follow and be like in the future.

Of all the girls in the Hinata House, she is victimized the most by Keitaro's clumsiness which often results in her being naked or exposed in some fashion, touched or grabbed inappropriately, or lying in very suggestive positions, she is also the one who usually hits him when he is in this situation with other girls (despite the fact that half the time it wasn't even his fault). This is further tempered by the fact that his room is directly underneath hers, a hole in the ceiling connects the two making for easy access, and they study together most of the time. Once, she beat Keitaro up because she entered his room while he was changing and later explained that hitting him had become an involuntary reaction. These situations along with her quick retribution thereafter are a recurring element in the series. Her attacks become increasingly more volatile as the story progresses. Despite her reactions towards him, Naru finds her day to feel highly off-center without any of Keitaro's unintentional perversions. She develops strong feelings for Keitaro, though initially has great difficulty in coming to terms with them. Naru's conflicting emotions causes her to become extremely jealous of his closeness with the other girls while at the same time stay in a state of denial and emotional unsteadiness. Because of her aggressive yet caring personality, Naru is a best known example of the tsundere character archetype.

Naru owns a Liddo-kun doll that Keitaro gave her when she was two years old; it was originally Mutsumi's but she gave it to him to give it to "Na-chan" as a love gift. She is also given a flying onsen turtle, Tama-chan, and a kiss as a sign of forgiveness and thanks for helping her get back home after the entrance exams.

Her character follows along with the beautiful-nerd disposition with the exception that she is actually very spontaneous and sometimes quite clumsy. Like Keitaro, she strove to get into Tokyo University because of a promise she had made to someone in the past. She is very intelligent, having placed Tops in the nation on the college practice entrance exams at the same cram school that Keitaro was enrolled in. However, this was not always so as was shown that several years before the beginning of the story Naru was like Keitaro, having horrible grades and little hope of passing. She was able to overcome this by constantly studying under the guidance of Noriyasu Seta, whom she had a crush on at the time. However, this resulted in a decline in her social activities as well as damaging her eyesight. When not using contacts, she has to wear glasses with thick lenses. Despite her dedication to her studies she failed to pass the Tokyo University entrance exam the first time but was able to pass the second time around. One of her goals is to become a teacher.

Towards the end of the series she finally confesses her love for Keitaro. In the anime, she does this several times in the specials but eventually culminates in one moment when she screams it out and kisses Keitaro passionately.

=== Anime ===
In the anime, Naru is less often placed by the writers in compromising or revealing situations than in the manga, and is also less aggressive towards Keitaro. In the manga, for example, her first encounter with Keitaro in the hot springs is more revealing than the manga, when she mistakes him for Mitsune "Kitsune" Konno due to her not wearing her glasses or contacts at the time. She then proceeds to follow him relentlessly, after several embarrassing run-ins around the house, so as to protect the other girls. She is also more prone to being exposed, grabbed, or depicted in very provocative positions in the manga, which are heavily played on in the Love Hina series.

Naru is much more tolerant of Keitaro when he first arrived in the anime than the manga, and halfway through Volume 1 in the manga, she participates in the "Get Rid of Keitaro Plan" devised by the other girls and becomes the coldest of the group towards him.

In the manga, Naru made promises with three people that she would get into Tokyo University. At first, she did it because of her crush for Seta. However, it started when Naru was only two years old and living in Hinata when she and Keitaro promised to go to Tokyo University together. Because she was too young, Naru could not remember that promise. She had also promised Mutsumi Otohime to go to Tokyo University in an effort to be reminded of her promise with Keitaro. In the anime she talks at length about her promise to Seta, and the promise to Keitaro is revealed in a flashback in the beginning of the first episode, but the promise to Mutsumi is left out.

The manga also follows Naru's relationship with Keitaro longer and more closely after they both pass their entrance exams. The main focus of the story switches to their feelings, commitment mishaps and problems, and insecurities—all of which are often depicted in comical manner. Rather surprisingly, Naru is initially the one to ask Keitaro if he wanted to take their relationship to another level. The series ends with them having developed a more mature and committed relationship.

In the epilogue set four years later, Naru marries Keitaro fulfilling their childhood dreams. The anime ends before this happens.

Yui Horie, who voiced Naru in the Japanese version, is also noted for singing the opening theme song Kirari Takaramono (lit. Glittering Treasures) and ending song Be for me, be for you for the Love Hina Again OVA.

== Reception ==
Overexaggerated physical confrontations between the main characters is a recurring theme in the Love Hina series, as well as a criticism of both the manga and anime.

Reviews of Naru's character have been negative with more positive results for fan polls. Author Richard W. Kroon cites Naru as an example of a Tsundere character, who is harsh at first, then later gentle. Freelance Writer Maria Remizova from Comic Book Resources placed Naru as #10 on a "10 Worst-Written Female Characters From Classic Anime" list. While she said that the Tsundere trope can be handled well, this is not the case with Naru, due to her "manipulative, aggressive and outright abusive behavior" that only leads to hatred. Remizova then mentions how Keitaro is "genuinely afraid" of Naru which undermines a well-written love interest. Freelance writer Dallas Marshall from Comic Book Resource shares Remizova's opinion on how she is written so viewers sympathize with her, which he calls "baffling". Marshall describes Naru as "manipulative, obsessive, mean-spirited and throws punches under the slightest provocation". While he says that Keitaro Urashima isn't flawless, the fact that he is constantly insulted and assaulted to the point where he becomes used to the abuse just for laughs is the worst.

Around the halfway point of the Manga run, a character popularity poll was run to find the most popular female character in the series, and the results were printed in Love Hina 0, an official fan reference book. In the poll Naru ranked first, with 3,831 votes in comparison to 1,500 votes for Shinobu Maehara. At the end of the series, another poll was run, with Naru coming third with 20,935 votes. Naru was beaten by Shinobu with 22,517 votes and by Motoko Aoyama with 21,161 votes. Another poll appeared in volume 7 of the manga, with Naru coming first with 784 votes followed by Shinobu with 406 votes. There were 2,506 votes in total. She was ranked 67th out of 100 in a 2002 poll on the favorite heroine of the year in the Japanese edition of Newtype.

Naru has been the subject of a large range of merchandise, such as figures, gashapon, posters, postcards and other goods, both by herself and with other characters from the series. Merchandise is available in both her manga character design and her anime character design. Tokyo Mint produced several cold-cast resin statues of the Love Hina cast in 1/8th scale that were released worldwide. Three of these statues were of Naru. The first statue featured Naru in a pink Bikini and was released in December 2002 in a production run limited to 600 pieces. The statue was a complete sell out. The second Naru statue was released in August 2003, again limited to 600 pieces. The final Naru statue, again limited to 600 pieces but in a new 1/6 size, featured Naru in a typical outfit of a yellow top and a red skirt.
