= Honey Jet!! =

- Standard Edition

Studio album by Yui Horie
- Released: July 15, 2009
- Genre: J-pop
- Length: 52:55
- Language: Japanese
- Label: Star Child Records

Yui Horie chronology
Darling (2008)	Honey Jet!! (2009)	Himitsu (2012)

Singles from Honey Jet!!
- 1. "Vanilla Salt" Released: October 22, 2008; 2. "silky heart" Released: January 28, 2009

HONEY JET!! is the seventh album by Yui Horie. It was released on July 15, 2009, as a standard edition and a limited edition.

The album achieved a peak position of tenth in the Oricon Charts, staying in the chart for five weeks.

== Track listing ==
1. moment
2. JET!!
3. Secret Garden
4. prism
5. Vanilla Salt (バニラソルト)
  - First ending theme song for the anime Toradora!
6. Spica (スピカ)
7. silky heart
  - Second opening theme song for the anime Toradora!
8. Get up and Go
9. Peppermint Days
10. Love Countdown
11. Blue Rainy Days
12. Beside You (君のそばに)
13. Dear...
