= Voice Fantasia =

1997 video game

Voice Fantasia S: Ushinawareta Voice Power
- Developer(s): Pre-Stage; Japan Media Programming
- Publisher(s): ASK Kodansha
- Platform(s): Sega Saturn, PlayStation
- Release: Sega Saturn: JP: July 25, 1997; PlayStation: JP: October 2, 1997
- Genre(s): Role-playing
- Mode(s): Single-player

Voice Fantasia S: Ushinawareta Voice Power (ボイスファンタジアS 失われたボイスパワー) is a role-playing video game (RPG) developed by Pre-Stage and Japan Media Programming and published by ASK Kodansha on July 25, 1997 for Sega Saturn. A port for the PlayStation, simply titled Voice Fantasia: Ushinawareta Voice Power (ボイスファンタジア 失われたボイスパワー), was published on October 2, 1997.

The game features three cute girls as main characters solving a quest. The graphics of the game were dated already by 1997 and so it heavily stressed on voice acting. There was a lot of spoken parts albeit not all the actors were famous by the time the game was made.

Yui Horie also started her career as a voice actress in this game.
