= Music of Kurogane Communication =

Below are single albums pertaining to the anime series, Kurogane Communication.

== my best friend ==
"my best friend"

Single by Yui Horie
- B-side: "Dear mama"
- Released: November 18, 1998
- Genre: J-pop
- Length: 16:06
- Label: Pony Canyon
- Songwriter(s): Sora

Yui Horie singles chronology
"my best friend" (1998)	"brand-new communication" (1999)

my best friend is Yui Horie's first single album under her name as well as the first single album released under Pony Canyon. It was released on 18 March, 1999. They were used as the opening song and the ending song in the anime series, Kurogane Communication. In addition, both songs were re-released in her 2003 complication album, Ho?: Horie Yui Character Best Album.

=== In other media ===
Yui Horie humorously mentioned the song, my best friend, in her radio show, Horie Yui no Tenshi no Tamago, about the selection of songs to sing in a karaoke.

=== Track listing ===
No.	Title	Lyrics	Length
1.	"my best friend"	Sora	3:56
2.	"Dear mama"	Sora	4:01
3.	"my best friend（original karaoke）"
4.	"Dear mama（original karaoke）"

== brand-new communication ==
"brand-new communication"

Single by Yui Horie
- Released: March 17, 1999
- Genre: J-pop
- Length: 10:56
- Label: Pony Canyon
- Songwriter(s): Sora

Yui Horie singles chronology
"my best friend" (1998)	"brand-new communication" (1999)	"Love Destiny" (2001)

brand-new communication (brand-new コミュニケイション) is Yui Horie's second single album. It was released on 17 March, 1999. The specific word in the Japanese title, communication, is unique that it does not use chōonpu (i.e. コミュニケーション) as with the Japanese title of the related anime series. It is the final album released under the Pony Canyon label in Yui Horie's name. The song, Hanagara no One Piece, is included in the separately-released Kurogane Communication original soundtrack.

=== Track listing ===
No.	Title	Lyrics	Length
1.	"brand-new komyunikēshon (brand-new コミュニケイション)"	Sora	4:33
2.	"Yubikiri (ゆびきり)"	Sora	4:01
3.	"Hanagara no One Piece (花柄のワンピース)"	Sora	2:23
