= Kuroneko to Tsuki Kikyū o Meguru Bōken =

Studio album by Yui Horie
- Released: November 29, 2001
- Genre: J-pop
- Length: 56:50
- Label: Star Child Records
- Producer: Toshimichi Otsuki, Sakumi Matsuda and Atsushi Moriyama

Yui Horie chronology
Mizutamari ni Utsuru Sekai (2000)	Kuroneko to Tsuki Kikyū o Meguru Bōken (2001)	Ho? (2003)

Kuroneko to Tsuki Kikyū o Meguru Bōken (黒猫と月気球をめぐる冒険) is Yui Horie's second album. It contains two alternative versions of the songs Love Destiny and Tsubasa (翼) from her third single, Love Destiny which were also used from the show Sister Princess. The name of the album could be translated "The adventures of the Black Cat with the Moon Balloon." The name of the Black Cat League, Yui Horie fan club, probably originates itself from this album. It peaked at number 15 on the Oricon Albums Chart.

== Track listing ==
1. 朝の声
  (Asa no koe, voice of the morning)
2. この指とまれ
  (Kono yubi tomare, Touch this finger)
3. フェイク・ファー
  (Feiku fā, Fake fur)
4. Pure
5. Love Destiny - Album Mix
6. Gravity
7. 翼 - Album Mix
  (Tsubasa, Wings)
8. 月の気球
  (Tsuki no kikyū, Moon balloon)
9. どんなことだって
  (Donna koto datte, Whatever may happen)
10. 心のカギ
  (Kokoro no kagi, Key to the heart)
11. So depecher
12. 新しいドアへ‥
  (Atarashii doa e, Towards a new door)
13. 小さじ一杯の勇気
  (Kosaji ippai no yūki, A little spoonful of courage)
