= Sky (Yui Horie album) =

Studio album by Yui Horie
- Released: July 24, 2003
- Genre: J-pop
- Length: 55:46
- Label: Starchild
- Producer: Toshimichi Otsuki, Sakumi Matsuda and Atsushi Moriyama

Yui Horie chronology
Ho? (2003)	Sky (2003)	Rakuen (2004)

Sky is Yui Horie's third solo album. A limited-edition version of this album was released with an alternate album cover and included a photo book. This album also has the opening and ending themes from her radio show "Tenshi no Tamago". The album peaked at number 10 on the Oricon Albums Chart.

== Track listing ==
1. "お気に入りの自転車"
  (o-Ki ni iri no jitensha, My favourite bicycle)
2. "Romantic flight"
3. "Eyes memorize"
4. "見つめられたら" ~ when I fall in love with you
  (Mitsumeraretara, When being gazed upon)
5. "Rain"
6. "It's my style"
7. "タイムカプセル"
  (Taimu kapuseru, Time capsule)
8. "ひまわりと飛行機雲"
  (Himawari to hikōkigumo, Sunflowers and a vapor trail)
9. "Angel 恋をした"
  (Angel koi o shita, Angel, I fell in love)
10. "All my love" - album mix
11. "Tomorrow"
12. "I just wanna be with you"
13. "In the sky"
