= Darling (Yui Horie album) =

Studio album by Yui Horie
- Released: January 30, 2008
- Genre: J-pop, bubblegum pop
- Length: 60:46
- Label: Star Child Records
- Producer: Toshimichi Otsuki; Yosuke Kinoshita; Atsushi Moriyama

Yui Horie chronology
Usotsuki Alice to Kujiragō o Meguru Bōken (2005)	Darling (2008)	Honey Jet (2009)

Darling is the sixth album by Yui Horie. It was released on January 30, 2008.

== Track listing ==
No.	Title	Length
1.	"Lalala Song of Love (ラララ愛の歌, Lalala Ai no Uta)"	4:15
2.	"Time machine"	4:33
3.	"Days" (Opening theme song of the anime Nagasarete Airantō)	4:12
4.	"God Please (かみさまおねがい, Kami Sama Onegai)"	3:51
5.	"The weather chart in love (恋する天気図, Koisuru Tenkizu)" (Second ending theme song of Nagasarete Airantō)	4:53
6.	"Say cheese!" (First ending theme song of Nagasarete Airantō)	4:01
7.	"The words that can't be conveyed (伝えられない言葉, Tsutaerarenai Kotoba)"	5:36
8.	"Light (ヒカリ, Hikari)" (Opening theme song of the anime Inukami!)	3:48
9.	"LOVE ME DO" (Cover version of the angela song)	5:17
10.	"Lovely Everyday (ラブリ♥エブリデイ, Raburi Eburidei)"	4:56
11.	"The clear wind blows (きれいな風が吹いている, Kirei na Kaze ga Fuiteiru)"	3:35
12.	"Always (ずっと, Zutto)"	5:08
13.	"Hello (ハロー, Haroo)"	4:01
14.	"Little Honey Bee"	2:40
Total length:		60:46
