= Rakuen (album) =

楽園 (Rakuen)

Studio album by Yui Horie
- Released: April 28, 2004
- Genre: J-pop
- Length: 54:01
- Label: Star Child Records
- Producers: Toshimichi Otsuki, Sakumi Matsuda and Atsushi Moriyama

Yui Horie chronology
sky (2003)	楽園 (Rakuen) (2004)	Usotsuki Alice to Kujiragō o Meguru Bōken (2005)

Rakuen (楽園, Paradise) is Yui Horie's fourth solo album. Like sky, her third album, Rakuen also had a limited-edition version with an alternate album cover and an exclusive photo book. The album includes the ending theme for the anime Jubei-chan 2, "Kokoro Harete Yo mo Akete" and the opening theme for the anime Sister Princess Re Pure Character's Part, "A Girl in Love" (used for DVD release only). Although the other sisters from Sister Princess Re Pure and even Ritsuko Okazaki, who wrote the song herself, have performed the latter song, the version on this album is the only full-length version ever recorded. The rest of the tracks are all original songs. It peaked at number 11 on the Oricon Albums Chart.

== Track listing ==
1. クローバー♣ – 2:22
  - (Kurōbā, Clover)
2. A Girl in Love – 3:13
3. 虹色☆サーチ – 4:52
  - (Nijiiro sāchi, Searching for the colour of the rainbow)
4. Baby, I love you! – 3:29
5. Tutty Fruity – 4:07
6. 恋ごころ – 4:06
  - (Koigokoro, Awakening of love)
7. 波のまばたき – 3:44
  - (Nami no mabataki, Sparkling of the waves)
8. on my way – 4:28
9. try again – 5:43
10. 心晴れて夜も明けて – 3:17
  - (Kokoro harete yo mo akete, When the heart becomes unclouded, dawn to will come)
11. 笑顔の連鎖 – 3:33
  - (Egao no rensa, Connection of the smiling faces)
12. BE FREE – 5:34
13. Invitation – 5:33
