= 4th Seiyu Awards =

Japanese voice acting awards ceremony in 2010

- Awarded for: Voice acting in Japan
- Date: March 6, 2010
- Location: UDX Theater; Akihabara, Tokyo
- Country: Japan

Highlights
- Best Lead Actor: Daisuke Ono
- Best Lead Actress: Miyuki Sawashiro
- Website: www.seiyuawards.jp

The 4th Seiyu Awards ceremony was held on March 6, 2010, at UDX Theater in Akihabara, Tokyo. It was followed up by a Special Stage Event with the winners on March 28. The period of general voting lasted from Oct 1, 2009 to Jan 1, 2010.

Winners	Agency	Characters	Anime
Best Actor in leading role
Daisuke Ono	Mausu Promotion	Sebastian Michaelis	Black Butler
Best Actress in leading role
Miyuki Sawashiro	Mausu Promotion	Canaan; Lag Seeing	Canaan; Tegami Bachi
Best Actors in supporting roles
Daisuke Namikawa	Across Entertainment	Mikage; Shota Kazehaya	07-Ghost; Kimi ni Todoke
Shin-ichiro Miki	81 Produce	Roy Mustang; Lockon Stratos	Fullmetal Alchemist; Mobile Suit Gundam 00
Best Actresses in supporting roles
Kikuko Inoue	Office Anemone	Sanae Furukawa	CLANNAD -AFTER STORY- Macross Frontier
Yui Horie	VIMS	Minori Kushieda; Tsubasa Hanekawa	Toradora! Bakemonogatari
Best Rookie actors
Atsushi Abe	Ken Production	Toma Kamijo	A Certain Magical Index
Tomoaki Maeno	Arts Vision	Toya Fujii; Saku Oyagi	White Album; Sora no Manimani
Best Rookie actresses
Kanae Ito	Aoni Production	Mihoshi Akeno; Koume Suzukawa	Sora no Manimani; Taishō Baseball Girls
Aki Toyosaki	Music Ray'n	Yui Hirasawa; Kana Nakamachi	K-On! Kanamemo
Best Personality
Winner	Agency	Radio Programs	Broadcasting Station
Masaya Onosaka	Aoni Production	Atsumare Masakano Henshubu; A&G GAME MASTER GT-R	Radio Kansai; Cho!A&G (AGQR)
Best Musical Performance
Winners	Record Label	Album	Anime
Hokago Tea Time (Aki Toyosaki, Yōko Hikasa, Satomi Sato, Minako Kotobuki, Ayana Taketatsu)	Pony Canyon	Hokago Tea Time	K-On!
Winners	Agency		
Special Achievement Award
Kazue Takahashi	Freelance (final career)		
Achievement Award
Tessho Genda	81 Produce		
Kazuko Sugiyama	Aoni Production		
Nobuo Tanaka	Haikyō		
Synergy Award
Mobile Suit Gundam (Toru Furuya, Shūichi Ikeda)
Kei Tomiyama Memorial Award (Topical Award)
Nana Mizuki	Sigma Seven		
Overseas Fan's Award
Mitsuki Saiga	Ken Production		
Kids Family Award
Wasabi Mizuta	Production Baobab		
