= Yui Horie =

Japanese voice actress and singer (born 1976)

- 堀江 由衣
- Born: September 20, 1976 (age 50); Tokyo, Japan
- Occupations: Voice actress; singer
- Years active: 1997–present
- Agent: VIMS
- Awards: Best Supporting Actress at 4th Seiyu Awards
- Musical career
- Genres: J-pop; Anison
- Instrument: Vocals
- Years active: 1998–present
- Labels: Pony Canyon; Starchild / King
- Website: horie-yui.com

Yui Horie (堀江 由衣, Horie Yui; born September 20, 1976) is a Japanese voice actress and singer affiliated with VIMS and Starchild. She has been affectionately nicknamed "Hocchan" (ほっちゃん) by her Japanese fans. She debuted as a voice actress in 1997, releasing her debut single "My best friend" on November 18, 1998. Since then, she has been involved in excess of 350 productions in addition to promotional material, concert performances, as well as charting several albums and singles. She won the award for Best Supporting Voice Actress in the 4th Seiyu Awards.

She is one of a handful of Japanese idol voice actors that rose to prominence in the 2000s, whose popularity today has been attributed to their solid experience and long-term interaction with their fan base, as opposed to the contemporary norms of youth and beauty in the entertainment industry. As a result of her ongoing success, she has performed solo at large music venues, such as the Nippon Budokan in 2009 and the Yoyogi National Gymnasium's First Stadium in 2015, each with capacities of approximately 14,000 and 13,000, respectively. Her official fanclub is the "Black Cat Alliance".

Some of her notable roles in anime include Naru Narusegawa in Love Hina, Izayoi Riko/Cure Magical in Witchy PreCure!, Multi in To Heart, Tohru Honda in Fruits Basket, Ai in Dōbutsu no Mori, Ayu Tsukimiya in Kanon, Yuki Cross in Vampire Knight, Hanyuu and Maria Ushiromiya in, respectively, Higurashi When They Cry and Umineko When They Cry, Miss Monochrome in Miss Monochrome, Minori Kushieda in Toradora!, Tsubasa Hanekawa in Monogatari, Chie Satonaka in Persona 4, Kōko Kaga in Golden Time, Charle in Fairy Tail and Wiz in KonoSuba.

== Personal life ==
Born in Tokyo, Horie spent much of her younger years as a latchkey kid. As a child, she would spend most of her time alone, playing outside of her residence after school until 7pm, when her parents would return from work. In junior high school, she joined the volleyball club but did not enjoy it much. Horie refers to her time at junior high and high school as her 'dark era'. Early childhood interests included watching the anime series Dirty Pair. She was fascinated by the main premise as a detective. She would act out scenes from memory with a school friend and also record herself with a cassette player.

In 1995, during the first year of college, Horie auditioned at the Japan Voice Acting Institute for a scholarship, the voice training school for Arts Vision. She can be quoted as saying "I went for an audition instead of hunting for a job, hahaha....". Horie graduated after 4 years of training. During this time she entered the SME Voice Actor Audition in 1996, winning the Namco Prize, (with Ayako Kawasumi winning the Special Award). On August 28, 1996, Horie and 21 other voice students (including Yukari Tamura) were unveiled at Nippon Cultural Broadcasting Inc.'s "SOMETHING DREAMS '96" at the Tokyo International Exhibition Centre as the Dorikan Club, a group of aspiring voice actresses.

== Career ==
=== 1997–1999: Early career ===
Whilst still training and under the representation of Arts Vision, Horie made her voice acting debut in the 1997 Sega Saturn game, Voice Fantasia: Ushinawareta Voice Power. Her first leading role was in the 1998 anime Kurogane Communication, of which she sang the theme songs, "My best friend" and "Dear Mama". These two songs were released as Horie's first single under the Pony Canyon music label. In 1999, with the increasing number of eroge and visual novels being adapted to anime, Horie was able to win a major role as Multi, a robotic girl, in the romantic anime To Heart.

=== 2000–2003: Growing success ===
The following year, Horie succeeded in auditioning for the lead female role of the TV anime adaptation of the shōnen manga comedy Love Hina, as Naru Narusegawa. Love Hina was a huge hit, with sales of over one million DVDs. The high popularity at the time lead to Lycos Japan using the anime to advertise its search engine and other services, with narration from Horie. This was to be her first CM. The ascending popularity of Love Hina spawned a lucrative franchise of OVAs, Drama CDs and games, of which Horie reprised the star role.

In regard to their rising fame, Horie worked with Yukari Tamura and form the group Yamato Nadeshiko (やまとなでしこ). This group had two debuts in 2000, on April 30 at the Yoyogi National Gymnasium and May 13 at Nagoya's Nadia Park Complex. The first of these was called "Yamato Nadeshiko Debut Kinen First Live ~suddenly 1000 seconds live in Yoyogi~", which happened during the "Dorikan Club Fifth Anniversary Event". Together they would release two singles, "Mō Hitori no Watashi" (もうひとりの私) in 2000 and "Merry Merrily" in 2001, the latter being used as an insert song in the Love Hina Christmas Special. This collaboration ended with a seven date concert tour during June 2003, including stops at Sapporo, Nagoya, Osaka and Tokyo.

2000 also saw Horie publish her first photobook, Kingyobachi Puranetto (金魚鉢プラネット, Fishbowl Planet), and the release of her debut album, Mizutamari ni Utsuru Sekai, through the Starchild label which featured two songs from Love Hina.

In 2001, Starchild established her official fan club called Kuroneko Union (黒ネコ同盟, Kuroneko dōmei; lit. "Black Cat Alliance"), where member benefits included fan events, priority seating in concerts, bimonthly newsletters, and access to exclusive merchandise. The first meeting, which was named "Black Cat Rally Vol.1 - Akasaka BLITZ" was on July 21, where they held a rally and a quiz show.

Early in 2002, Horie's first solo concert tour kicked off on January 26 at the Club Diamond Hall in Nagoya, a 1000 capacity venue.
"堀江由衣 First Live Tour", lasted a total of 6 nights, travelling to Tokyo and ending on February 11 in Osaka at the Matsushita IMP Hall. In 2002, she voiced Ayu Tsukimiya in the anime adaptation of Kanon, an adult visual novel that she had also voiced in 1999. Horie released her first collection of music videos on July 29. The 27 minute VHS tape was called Yui Horie CLIPS 0 〜since '00〜'01〜, featuring interviews, making-ofs and notably the music video for "Love Destiny" the theme song of the 2001 anime adaptation of Sister Princess.

The same year, Horie started her weekly radio show, "Horie Yui no Tenshi no Tamago" (堀江由衣の天使のたまご), which was first broadcast on October 6, and can currently be heard on the station JOQR (文化放送) (AM 1134 kHz) at 22:00 – 22:30 every Sunday. Her signature catchphrase is "Angel Beam in your Heart!" and frequently features anison guests such as angela, Nana Mizuki and Megumi Hayashibara. As of the end of 2016, the show has run in excess of 740 episodes.

In 2003, Horie established herself as a popular singer when her third album "Sky" peaked at 10th in the Oricon charts.

=== Other activities ===
In October 2005, she founded Aice^{5}, a J-Pop group consisting of four other voice actors, to help launch their careers. Their debut single was "Get Back", released March 13, 2006. Aice^{5} was disbanded on September 20, 2007, at their farewell concert "Final Aice5 Party LAST Aice5" at the Yokohama Arena. During this time, they released six singles and one album. Their album "Love Aice^{5}" was released on February 26, 2007, remaining in the Oricon charts for four weeks with a highest rank of eight. Aice^{5} has since been revived, announced on July 17, 2015, with the intention to release a new single on September 30 and have their comeback concert on November 22.

Horie has collaborated with a few other artists. In 2004, she released "Scramble" together with Unscandal. This ska inspired song was used as an opening theme song for the romantic comedy anime School Rumble . And in 2006, she formed the goth band Kurobara Hozonkai (lit. 'Black Rose Preservation Society'), with Horie taking the stage name of YUIEL. This band released the album "A Votre Sante!!" in 2008 and has been relatively inactive since.

Horie was affiliated with Arts Vision. However, she eventually left the agency in mid-2007 during an unrelated scandal in the agency's top management and became a freelance voice actress. Today, she's affiliated with VIMS, a division of I'm Enterprise. She has published seven independent musical albums. Nearly all of them incorporate at least one track from an anime she has worked with. She currently releases music under the Starchild label (a subdivision of King Records).

In late 2012, Horie created and voiced the 3D animated character Miss Monochrome. Her first appearance was in The Adventure Over Yui Horie III ~Secret Mission Tour~ concert, acting as the antagonist who wanted to turn the world black and white. The character has since had a self-titled anime series, with the premier season televised on October 1, 2013. The opening theme song, Poker Face, was released as a musical single. Other notable appearances include the iOS game Girlfriend Beta, a self-titled manga series and cameos in other anime.

== Filmography ==
=== Anime ===
List of voice performances in anime
Year	Title	Role	Notes	Source
1997	Photon: The Idiot Adventures	Aun Freya	OVA	
1998	Cyber Team in Akihabara	Francesca, Enoken		
1998	Weiß Kreuz	Aya Fujimiya	Also Glühen in 2002	
1998	Marvelous Melmo	Boo-chan	1998 re-dub	
1998	Orphen	Fiena		
1998	Kurogane Communication	Haruka, Mirai		
1998	Ojarumaru	Nezu		
1998	St. Luminous Mission High School	Lita Ford		
1998	Bubblegum Crisis Tokyo 2040	Galatea		
1998	Steam Detectives	Gina		
1999	To Heart	Multi (HMX-12); Cat, Female student		
1999	Arc the Lad	Lieza		
1999–2000	Omishi Magical Theater: Risky Safety	Suzuko Natsume		
1999	Infinite Ryvius	Michelle Cay		
1999	Trouble Chocolate	Mint		
1999	Shukan Storyland	Akane (あかね)		
1999	Dangaizer 3	Pikushisu		
2000	Mon Colle Knights	Rockna Hiiragi		
2000	Platinumhugen Ordian	Carol Quaser		
2000–02	Love Hina series	Naru Narusegawa	OVAs and specials	
2000	Argento Soma	Sue Harris		
2000	Sci-Fi Harry	Catherine Chapman		
2000	Android Kikaider: The Animation	Mitsuko Komyoji		
2001	Tales of Eternia: The Animation	Corina Solgente	Anime original character	
2001	Comic Party	Multi		
2001	Angelic Layer	Hiromi Fujimori		
2001	Prétear	Mikage		
2001–02	Sister Princess series	Sakuya	Also Re Pure	
2001	Figure 17	Sakura Ibaragi		
2001	Cosmic Baton Girl Cometto-san	Mira		
2001–21	Shaman King series	Lilly, Iron Maiden Jeanne		
2001	Fruits Basket	Tohru Honda		
2001	Babel II: Beyond Infinity	Meilin		
2002	One Piece	Aswa	Ep. 100	
2002	Kanon	Ayu Tsukimiya		
2002	Magical Shopping Arcade Abenobashi	Amiryun		
2002	Jing: King of Bandits	Mirabelle		
2002	Samurai Deeper Kyo	Yuya Shiina		
2002	Ground Defense Force! Mao-chan	Silvia Maruyama		
2002	Shrine of the Morning Mist	Koma		
2002–03	Spiral	Rio Takeuchi		
2003	Nanaka 6/17	Yuriko Amemiya		
2003	The Mythical Detective Loki Ragnarok	Mayura Daidouji		
2003	Ultra Maniac	Ayu Tateishi		
2003	Detective School Q	Sayaka Kinoshita		
2003–08	Da Capo series	Kotori Shirakawa, Yume Asakura	Also Second Season, II and II: Second Season	
2003	Bottle Fairy	Sarara		
2004	Re: Cutie Honey	Honey Kisaragi	OVA series	
2004	Jubei-chan 2: The Counter Attack of Siberia Yagyu	Jiyuu Nanohana		
2004	Yugo the Negotiator	Nadenka		
2004	Mars Daybreak	Megumi Higashibara		
2004	Sore Ike! Zukkoke Sannin-gumi (それいけ！ズッコケ三人組)	Noriko		
2004	To Heart 〜Remember my Memories〜	Multi (HMX-12))		
2004–06	School Rumble series	Eri Sawachika	Also Second Semester and OVAs	
2004–05	Futakoi series	Kaoruko Ichijo	Also Alternative	
2005	Negima! series	Makie Sasaki		
2005	Air	Schoolgirl	Ep. 2	
2005–06	Majime ni Fumajime Kaiketsu Zorori	Jeju		
2005	The Law of Ueki	Pekoru		
2005	Loveless	Ginka		
2005	Mahoraba 〜Heartful Days	Tamami Chanohata		
2005	Pani Poni Dash	Miyako Uehara		
2005–06	Canvas 2: Niji Iro no Sketch	Hairdresser		
2005	Immortal Grand Prix	Fantine		
2005	The Wings of Rean	Elebos	OVA	
2006	Kashimashi: Girl Meets Girl	Yasuna Kamiizumi		
2006	Inukami!	Yoko		
2006	Ray the Animation	Sumire Horiuchi (堀内すみれ)		
2006–12	The Familiar of Zero series	Siesta	4 TV series	
2006	D.Gray-man	Meyrin (メイリン)		
2006	Negima!?	Makie Sasaki		
2006	Kanon	Ayu Tsukimiya	2006 remake	
2006	Otome wa Boku ni Koishiteru	Mizuho Miyanokōji		
2007	Gakuen Utopia Manabi Straight!	Manami Amamiya		
2007	Tokyo Majin series	Aoi Misato	Also 2nd Act	
2007	Idolmaster: Xenoglossia	Yukiho Hagiwara		
2007–09	Sugarbunnies series	Shirousa		
2007	Nagasarete Airantou	Suzu		
2007	Shining Tears X Wind	Touka Kureha		
2007	Bokurano: Ours	Chairwoman		
2007	Sky Girls	Nanae Fujieda		
2007–21	Higurashi When They Cry series	Hanyū	starting with Kai	
2007	Fantastic Detective Labyrinth	Byakko, Maru, Mariko Eto		
2008	Shigofumi	Suzune Shinozaki	Ep. 13	
2008–09	The Tower of Druaga	Fatina		
2008	Our Home's Fox Deity.	Miyako Takagami		
2008	Hakken Taiken Daisuki! Shimajirō	Voice of Shinkansen (新幹線の声)		
2008	Vampire Knight series	Yuki Cross	Also Guilty	
2008	Ikki Tousen: Great Guardians	Chuubo Sonken		
2008	Hyakko	Chie Suzugazaki		
2008	Toradora!	Minori Kushieda	Best Actress in a Supporting Role, 4th Seiyu Awards	
2008–09	Corpse Princess series	Kamika Todoroki, Black Cat, Riko		
2009	Lupin the 3rd vs. Detective Conan	Mira Julietta	Anime television film	
2009	Hayate the Combat Butler!!	Sonia Shaflnarz	Also Can't Take My Eyes Off You in 2012	
2009–14	Saki	Mihoko Fukuji	Also Achiga-hen and Nationals	
2009	Natsu no Arashi!	Kanako Yamazaki	Also Akinai-chū	
2009	Umi Monogatari	Urin		
2009	Sweet Blue Flowers	Kyōko Ikumi		
2009	Umineko When They Cry	Maria Ushiromiya		
2009	Bakemonogatari	Tsubasa Hanekawa		
2009	Sayonara, Zetsubou-Sensei	Shōko Maruuchi		
2009	Kanamemo	Haruka Nishida		
2009	GA Geijutsuka Art Design Class	Namiko Nozaki		
2009	Battle Spirits: Shounen Gekiha Dan	Sail		
2009–11	Kämpfer series	Akane Mishima	Also Fur de Liebe	
2009	Tegami Bachi	Roda (girl)	Also Reverse in 2010	
2009	Samurai: Hunt for the Sword	Lei Lin	OAV	
2010	Ikki Tousen: Xtreme Xecutor	Chuubo Sonken		
2010	B Gata H Kei	Miharu Takeshita		
2010	Jewelpet Twinkle ☆	Celine		
2010	Shimajirō Hesoka	Voice of the dinosaur (恐竜の声)		
2010	Mayoi Neko Overrun!	Kanae Naruko		
2010	Ōkami-san	Alice Kiriki		
2010–11	Nura: Rise of the Yokai Clan series	Tsurara Oikawa, Setsura	Also Demon Capital	
2010	Asobi ni Iku yo!	Jens	Also OVA in 2011	
2010	Otome Yōkai Zakuro	Hōzuki		
2010–Present	Fairy Tail	Charle		
2011	Dragon Crisis!	Maruga		
2011	Wandering Son	Anna Suehiro		
2011–15	Dog Days series	Millhiore Firianno Biscotti	Also Dash and Double Dash	
2011	Nichijou	Preview narration	Ep. 23 (preview for Ep. 24)	
2011	Astarotte no Omocha!	Effie	Also EX OVA in 2011	
2011	Kaitō Tenshi Twin Angel	Tesla Violet		
2011–15	YuruYuri series	Akane Akaza		
2011	Penguindrum	Masako Natsume, Esmeralda		
2011	Nekogami Yaoyorozu	Yuzu Komiya	Also OVA in 2012	
2011	Persona 4: The Animation series	Chie Satonaka	Also The Golden Animation in 2014	
2011	Ben-To	Kyō Sawagi (Vice President)		
2012	Nisemonogatari	Tsubasa Hanekawa		
2012	Bodacious Space Pirates	Coorie		
2012	Waiting in the Summer	Emika Takatsuki		
2012	Listen to Me, Girls. I Am Your Father!	Raika Oda	Also OVA in 2013	
2012	Is This a Zombie? of the Dead	Delusion Yu	Ep. 9	
2012	Arashi no Yoru ni	Mii		
2012	Sengoku Collection	Sunshine Rider Liu Bei		
2012	Shining Hearts: Shiawase no Pan	Rufina		
2012–13	AKB0048 series	Yuki Kashiwagi the 6th		
2012	Horizon in the Middle of Nowhere	Mary / "Scarred"	season 2	
2012	Battle Spirits: Sword Eyes	Kizakura Kukuri (キザクラ・ククリ)		
2012	Kamisama Kiss	Himemiko of the Swamp		
2012	From the New World	Reiko Amano		
2012	Busou Shinki	Ach		
2012–15	K series	Anna Kushina	Also Return of Kings	
2012–14	Little Busters! series	Riki Naoe	Also Refrain and EX	
2012–14	Magi: The Labyrinth of Magic series	Yamraiha	Also Adventure of Sinbad	
2012	The Pet Girl of Sakurasou	Ryūnosuke Akasaka, Maid-chan		
2012	Nekomonogatari (Kuro)	Tsubasa Hanekawa		
2013–15	DD Fist of the North Star	Yuria, Mamiya	2 seasons	
2013	Yuyushiki	Yoriko Matsumoto		
2013	Valvrave the Liberator	Rion Nanami	2 seasons	
2013	Symphogear	Serena Cadenzavna Eve	Starting with G	
2013	Monogatari Series Second Season	Tsubasa Hanekawa		
2013	Hyperdimension Neptunia: The Animation	Nepgear / Purple Sister		
2013	Battle Spirits: Saikyou Ginga Ultimate Zero	Eris the Morning Star		
2013–15	Miss Monochrome series	Miss Monochrome	3 seasons	
2013	Coppelion	Kanon Ozu		
2013	Golden Time	Kōko Kaga		
2013	Gargantia on the Verdurous Planet	Storia	OAV only	
2014	Wooser's Hand-to-Mouth Life	Miss Monochrome		
2014	Black Bullet	Kisara Tendō		
2014	Rail Wars!	Nana Iida		
2014–15	Shōnen Hollywood	Sanaka Kazami, Miss Monochrome	2 seasons	
2014	Sabagebu!	Ena Sakura		
2014	Persona 4: The Golden Animation	Chie Satonaka		
2014	Cross Ange	Salamandine		
2014	Girl Friend Beta	Miss Monochrome		
2014–16	Cardfight!! Vanguard	Mikuru Shindou	Starting with G	
2014	Supochan showdown! ~The Great Yokai Battle~	Maya		
2015	Absolute Duo	Sakuya Tsukumo		
2015	Minna Atsumare! Falcom Gakuen SC	Alisa Rheinfort (アリサ・ラインフォルト)		
2015	Kamisama Kiss◎	Himiko		
2015	Kantai Collection	Mamiya		
2015–16	A Simple Thinking About Blood Type	Type B-chan	Starting with season 2	
2015	I Can't Understand What My Husband Is Saying	Kimura Yuzu (木村ユズ)	Season 2	
2015	Wish Upon the Pleiades	El Nat (エルナト)		
2015	Aoharu x Machinegun	Kanae Yajima		
2015	Classroom Crisis	Kaoruko Takanashi		
2015	Shimoneta	Kosuri Onigashira		
2015	Seiyu's Life!	Herself		
2015	Owarimonogatari	Tsubasa Hanekawa		
2015	Aria the Scarlet Ammo AA	Kyouchikytou		
2015	Subete ga F ni Naru	Setsuko Gidō		
2016	Nisekoi	Yui Kanakura	OVA ep. 4	
2016–17	KonoSuba	Wiz	2 seasons	
2016–17	Maho Girls PreCure!	Riko Izayoi / Cure Magical		
2016	Re:Zero − Starting Life in Another World	Felix		
2016	Hundred	Charlotte Dimandias		
2016	Haven't You Heard? I'm Sakamoto	Aina Kuronuma		
2016–17	First Love Monster	Kaho Nikaidō	also OVA	
2016–17	Nyanbo!	Shiro		
2016–17	Digimon Universe: App Monsters	Izumi Kagurazaka		
2017	King's Game The Animation	Natsuko Honda		
2017	In Another World With My Smartphone	Goddess of Love	Ep. 12	
2018	Basilisk: The Ōka Ninja Scrolls	Itaru Yasha		
2018	Major 2nd	Michiru Mayumura		
2018	Cutie Honey Universe	Natsuko Aki		
2018	Lord of Vermilion: The Crimson King	Julia Ichijo		
2018	Phantom in the Twilight	Sha Rijan		
2018	Food Wars! Shokugeki no Soma	Anne	Season 3	
2018	Kyōto Teramachi Sanjō no Holmes	Saori Miyashita		
2019	How Heavy Are the Dumbbells You Lift?	Satomi Tachibana		
2019	Cardfight!! Vanguard: Shinemon	Mikuru Shindou		
2019	Azur Lane	Belfast		
2019	Bokuben: We Never Learn	Shizuru Furuhashi	Ep. 10	
2020	Magia Record	Mitama Yakumo		
2020	My Hero Academia	La Brava	Season 4	
2020	Princess Connect! Re:Dive	Saren / Saren Sasaki	Season 1	
2020	Shachibato! President, It's Time for Battle!	Guide		
2020	White Cat Project: Zero Chronicle	Hikari no Ō Airisu		
2020	Warlords of Sigrdrifa	Misato Honjo		
2020	Dropout Idol Fruit Tart	Oto Kogane		
2021	Hortensia Saga	Mariyus Casteledo		
2021	The Hidden Dungeon Only I Can Enter	Olivia Servant		
2021	Shadows House	Aileen		
2021	Shaman king	Iron Maiden Jeanne		
2021	Scarlet Nexus	Arashi Spring		
2021	How a Realist Hero Rebuilt the Kingdom	Excel Walter		
2021	The Idaten Deities Know Only Peace	Paula		
2021	The Faraway Paladin	Mary		
2021	My Senpai Is Annoying	Yūto Sakurai		
2021–22	Kaginado	Ayu Tsukimiya, Riki Naoe		
2022	Princess Connect! Re:Dive	Saren / Saren Sasaki	Season 2	
2022	She Professed Herself Pupil of the Wise Man	Mariana		
2022	Miss Kuroitsu from the Monster Development Department	Yūto Higatani/Magia Zwart		
2022	The Maid I Hired Recently Is Mysterious	Tsukasa Gojouin		
2022	The Eminence in Shadow	Akane Nishino		
2022	Kantai Collection: Let's Meet at Sea	Mamiya		
2023	16bit Sensation: Another Layer	Meiko Uehara		
2023	The Family Circumstances of the Irregular Witch	Hip		
2024	Ishura	Nastique the Quiet Singer		
2024	My Instant Death Ability Is So Overpowered	Sion		
2024	Chillin' in Another World with Level 2 Super Cheat Powers	Hiya		
2024	Mysterious Disappearances	Manami Uname		
2024	Highspeed Etoile	Sofia Tokitō		
2024	2.5 Dimensional Seduction	Liliel		
2024	Tying the Knot with an Amagami Sister	Yomiko Tsukigami		
2024	The Stories of Girls Who Couldn't Be Magicians	Minami Suzuki		
2025	I'm Living with an Otaku NEET Kunoichi!?	Saya Hazuki		
2025	Mahō Tsukai Precure!!: Mirai Days	Riko Izayoi / Cure Magical		
2025	The Dinner Table Detective	Kuninyan		
2025	Bad Girl	Maria Komari		
2026	High School! Kimengumi	Ran Wakato		
2026	A Misanthrope Teaches a Class for Demi-Humans	Maki Okonogi		

=== Feature films ===
List of voice performances in feature films
Year	Title	Role	Notes	Source
1999	Cyber Team in Akihabara: Summer Vacation of 2011	Francesca		
2000	Doraemon: Nobita and the Legend of the Sun King	Girl		
2000	Mon Colle Knights the Movie: The Legendary Fire Dragon and The Mysterious Tatari-chan	Rockna Hiiragi		
2000	Ah! My Goddess: The Movie	Chrono		
2002	Pia Carrot Movie	Orie Amano		
2006	Dōbutsu no Mori	Ai		
2007	Inukami! The Movie	Yoko		
2008	Keroro Gunso the Super Movie 3: Keroro vs. Keroro Great Sky Duel	Miruru		
2008	Crayon Shin-chan: The Storm Called: The Hero of Kinpoko	Mata Tami		
2009	Doraemon: The Record of Nobita's Spaceblazer	Molina (age 10)		
2011	Negima! Anime Final	Makie Sasaki		
2012	Fairy Tail the Movie: The Phoenix Priestess	Carla		
2013	Doraemon: Nobita's Secret Gadget Museum	Ginger		
2014	Bodacious Space Pirates: Abyss of Hyperspace	Courier		
2014	Sekai-ichi Hatsukoi: Yokozawa Takafumi no Baai	Hiyori Kirishima		
2014	K: Missing Kings	Anna Kushina		
2014	Spochan-Anime The Movie: Youkai Spochan Battle	Spirit Youkai Maya 精霊妖怪 マヤ		
2014	HappinessCharge PreCure! the Movie: The Ballerina of the Land of Dolls	Tsumugi Orihara		
2016	Kizumonogatari Part 1: Tekketsu	Tsubasa Hanekawa		
2016	Pretty Cure All Stars: Singing with Everyone♪ Miraculous Magic!	Riko Izayoi / Cure Magical		
2016	Kizumonogatari Part 2: Nekketsu	Tsubasa Hanekawa		
2016	Maho Girls PreCure! the Movie: The Miraculous Transformation! Cure Mofurun! Cure Miracle and Mofurun's Magic Lesson!	Riko Izayoi / Cure Magical		
2017	Kizumonogatari Part 3: Reiketsu	Tsubasa Hanekawa		
2017	Pretty Cure Dream Stars!	Riko Izayoi / Cure Magical		
2017	Fairy Tail: Dragon Cry	Carla		
2018	Pretty Cure Super Stars!	Riko Izayoi / Cure Magical		
2018	Hugtto! PreCure Futari wa Pretty Cure: All Stars Memories	Riko Izayoi / Cure Magical		
2019	KonoSuba: God's Blessing on this Wonderful World! Legend of Crimson	Wiz		
2020	Kono Sekai no Tanoshimikata: Secret Story Film	Yuko Shibasaki		
2021	Kud Wafter	Riki Naoe		
2022	Re:cycle of Penguindrum	Masako Natsume		
2022	Anime Supremacy!	Dell	Live-action film	
2027	The Eminence in Shadow: Lost Echoes	Akane Nishino		

=== Overseas dubbing ===
List of voice performances in overseas dubbing
Year	Title	Role	Notes	Source
1999	Teaching Mrs. Tingle	Trudie Tucker		
2001	When Good Ghouls Go Bad	Danya Stenson		
2002	Kiss Kiss (Bang Bang)	Mia		
2002	The Ring	Samara Morgan	Dubbed by Fuji TV	
2003	Hitler: The Rise of Evil	Geli Raubal		
2005	Dark Water	Cecilia "Ceci" Williams		
2005	Hide and Seek	Emily Callaway		
2006	Princess Hours	Shin Chae-kyeong	Korean drama - 24 episodes	
2013	Love Rain	Kim Yoon-Hee (1970s) & Jung Ha-na (2012)	Korea drama - 20 episodes Two characters over two time lines	
2014	Winx Club	Roxy	animated TV series (Japanese)	
2021	Mr. Moll and the Chocolate Factory	Evi		

=== Tokusatsu ===
List of performances in tokusatsu
Year	Title	Role	Notes	Source
	Millenarianism Three Musketeers Vanhee Knights	Aris La Zoanis	Voice only	
2014	Ressha Sentai ToQger	Wagon (ワゴン)		
2014	Ressha Sentai ToQger the Movie: Galaxy Line S.O.S.	Wagon (ワゴン)		
2015	Ressha Sentai ToQger vs. Kyoryuger: The Movie	Wagon (ワゴン)		

=== Video games ===
List of voice performances in video games
Year	Title	Role	Notes	Source
1997	Voice Fantasia S: Ushinawareta Voice Power	Nasty	PlayStation, Sega Saturn	
1998	L no Kisetsu ja:Lの季節	Yuuki Mainami	Also 2: Invisible Memories in 2008 and W Pocket in 2009	
1998–2004	Tokyo Majin games	Aoi Misato, Maid	PS2	
1998	Exodus Guilty Neos	Suii	Dreamcast	
1999	To Heart	Multi (aka HMX-12)	PC, PlayStation, Also PSE in 2003	
1999	Little Lovers: She So Game	Tenryaku, Nishimura-senpai, Mysterious girl	PlayStation	
1999	Maboroshi Tsukiyo まぼろし月夜	Ayame Asagiri	DreamCast, PlayStation	
1999	Magical Drop F - Daibouken Mo Rakujyanai! マジカルドロップF 大冒険もラクじゃない！	Fool's cat / star フールのネコ/スター	PlayStation	
1999	Tantei jingūji saburō tomoshibi ga kie nu ma ni 探偵神宮寺三郎 灯火が消えぬ間に	Shoka Matsuzawa 松沢祥香	PlayStation	
1999	Gate Keepers	Schoolgirl	PS1/PS2	
1999	Yuukyuu Gensoukyoku 3 Perpetual Blue 悠久幻想曲3 Perpetual blue	Flone Treatia フローネ・トリーティア	Dreamcast	
1999	Tokimeki Memorial Pocket Sports Hen	Naomi Shuuzou	Game Boy	
2000	RPG Maker 2000	Flora	Hanayome no Kammuri demo, PC	
2000	Scandal スキャンダル	Izumi Sayaka 和泉沙耶香	PS1/PS2	
2000	Orphen	Orchid	PS2	
2000	The desktop maid デスクトップのメイドさん	Millie ミリィ	PC; Windows用個人情報管理ツール集	
2000	Eternal Arcadia	Fina	Dreamcast, GameCube	
2000	Eternal Suite All Star Project	Frone Treatia	PlayStation	
2000–07	Kanon	Ayu Tsukimiya	Dreamcast, PS2, PSP, PC, Android, iOS	
2000	Blue Submarine No. 6: Antarctica	Sagami Rin 相模りん	PS1/PS2	
2000–03	Love Hina games	Naru Narusegawa	PlayStation, Dreamcast, others	
2000	Kimi ni Steady	Nozawa Hinano 野沢ひなの	PS1/PS2	
2001	Angelic Concert エンジェリック・コンサート	Safi-Sweeney	PC	
2001	Private phoenix school 1 year pure love group 私立鳳凰学園 1年純愛組	Mizuki Tone 利根村美玖	PS1/PS2	
2001	Zone of the Enders	Celvice Klein	PS2	
2001	EVE The Fatal Attraction	Fujii Yuka	PC, PlayStation	
2001	Dead or Alive 3	Hitomi		
2001	Prism Heart	Lise	Dreamcast	
2001	Growlanser III	Raimy	PS2	
2001	Doki Doki Pretty League Lovely Star ja:ドキドキプリティリーグ Lovely Star	Niino Miki 新野未来	PlayStation	
2001	Sister Princess series	Sakuya	Dreamcast, PlayStation, GBA; Also RePure in 2003	
2002	Bistro Cupid ja:ビストロ・きゅーぴっと	Lavender Sweet	Windows, PC	
2003	Dead or Alive Xtreme Beach Volleyball	Hitomi		
2003	Venus & Braves	Miretta	PS2, also version in 2011	
2003	EVE burst error PLUS	Ambassador Mido 御堂真弥子	PS2	
2003	Sakura: Snow Yuehua; SAKURA ～雪月華～	Koyuki Kusanagi	PS2	
2003–08	Da Capo games	Yume Asakura, Kotori Shirakawa		
2003–05	Little Witch Parfait ja:ハートフルメモリーズDVD	Rutil-el-Sahle ルティル=エル=サーレ	PC, Also Complete Pack in 2005	
2004	Castle Shikigami 2	Sayo Yuhki 結城小夜	PS2, others	
2004	Shaman King: Funbari Spirits	Iron Maiden Jeanne, Seyrum Munzer	PS2	
2004	Rozen Maiden	crimson 真紅	other	
2004	Kowloon Demon Academy Ji ja:九龍妖魔學園紀	Ayuko Hinakawa 雛川亜柚子	PS2	
2004	Graffiti Kingdom	Pastel	PS2	
2004	Neon Genesis Evangelion: Shinji Ikari Raising Project	Aoi Mogami	PC	
2004	Sentimental Prelude	Ayumi Nishina	PS2	
2004	Dead or Alive Ultimate	Hitomi	Xbox	
2004–06	Magna Carta: Crimson Stigmata	Lease	PS2	
2004	Angelic Concert Encore エンジェリック・コンサート～アンコール	Safi-Sweeney	PC	
2004–05	Futakoi games	Kaoruko Ichijō	PS2, also Alternative	
2005–07	Negima! games	Makie Sasaki		
2005	Radiata Stories	Natsumi Nagi	PS2	
2005	Anima Mundi dance of the end without darkness アニマムンディ 終りなき闇の舞踏	Lilith Zabrisk リリス・ザベリスク	PC	
2005	Shining Force Neo	Meryl	PS2	
2005	Sakura ~ Setsugekka ~ Flower Tank Fuki Premium Edition; SAKURA～雪月花～ 花鳥風月プレミアムエディション	Kusanagi Yuki 草薙小雪	PC	
2005–06	School Rumble games	Eri Sawachika		
2005	Fullmetal Alchemist 3: Kami o Tsugu Shōjo	Janice	PS2	
2005	Bottle Fairy	Sarara	PC	
2005	The Mythical Detective Loki Ragnarok	Mayura Daidouji	PS1/PS2	
2005	Dead or Alive 4	Hitomi	Xbox 360	
2006	Mobile Suit Gundam: Climax UC	Ellen Rochefil	PS2	
2006	Kowloon 妖魔 学園 紀 re: charge ja:九龍妖魔學園紀 re:charge	Yuzuko Chikawa 雛川亜柚子	PS1/PS2	
2006	Kashimashi: Girl Meets Girl	Yasuna Kamiizumi	PS2	
2006	Rumble Roses XX	Makoto Aihara / The Black Belt Demon	Xbox 360	
2006	Zegapain XOR	Mio Readiness	Xbox360	
2006	Minna de kitaeru zennou training	Lisa	Arcade	
2007–08	The Familiar of Zero games	Siesta	PS2	
2007–15	Higurashi When They Cry games	Hanyū, Narrator, others	Various	
2007	Gakuen Utopia Manabi Straight! Kira Kira Happy Fate!	Manami Amamiya	PS2	
2007	Shining Wind	Touka Kureha	PS2	
2007	Magical Halloween	Alice Wish-Heart	Pachinko game	
2007	Imōto Route	Mizuno Lily	PC	
2007	Wonderland Online	Iris	Windows	
2008	Persona 4	Chie Satonaka	PS2	
2008	Tsu Poi! Summer Experience!? 「っポイ！」 ひと夏の経験！？	Ichinose Hiyokohime	PS2	
2008	Momo Taisen Papers ja:桃色大戦ぱいろん	CERFIE · Irish / Himaphana セラフィー・アイリッシュ/姫花	PC	
2009	Dengeki Gakuen RPG: Cross of Venus	Minori Kushieda	DS, from Toradora!	
2009	Last Bullet	Karin Hibiki	DS	
2009	Toradora! games	Minori Kushieda	PSP	
2009	Nuga-Cel!	Maya	PS2	
2009	Rune Factory 3	Dahlia	DS	
2009	Kaitou Tenshi Twin Angel 3	Tesla Violet	Pachi Slot	
2009	Hyakko Yorozuya Jikenbo!	Suzugasaki Chie	PS2	
2009	Imouto Wife	Mizuno	PC	
2009	Last Bullet	Hibiki Karin	Nintendo DS	
2009–11	Umineko When They Cry games	Maria Ushiromiya		
2010	Gamebook DS Aquarian Age Perpetual Period	Mikoto Narumi	DS	
2010	Saki Portable	Mihoko Fukuji	PSP, Also The Nationals in 2015	
2010	Dead or Alive Paradise	Hitomi	PSP	
2010	Ikki Tousen Xross Impact	Chuubo Sonken	PSP	
2010	More Nuga-Cel!	Free Maya	PSP	
2010	Angelic Crest	Miya, Bearer-chan ミーヤ/ベアリィちゃむ	PC	
2010	Blaze Union	Shisukia	PSP	
2010	Busou Shinki Battle Masters	Arc	PSP	
2010	GA Geijutsuka Art Design Class: Slapstick Wonderland	Nozaki Namiko	PSP	
2010	Pastel Chime Continue ja:ぱすてるチャイムContinue	Ceres · Rubrand セレス・ルーブラン	PSP	
2010	Shining Hearts	Rufina	PSP	
2011	Tsukumonogatari	Minami Haruka	PSP	
2011	Dead or Alive: Dimensions	Hitomi	3DS	
2011–Present	Hyperdimension Neptunia games	Nepgear	Starting from Mk2	
2011	Labyrinth ~ of Kaitou Tenshi Twin Angel - when the world	Tesla Violet	PSP	
2011	Nura: Rise of the Yokai Clan	Setsura	PS3, Xbox 360	
2012	Kirameki School Life SP - The Wonder Years	Miho Fujibayashi	PSP	
2012	Gal*Gun	Ekoro	PS3, also in 2015	
2012	Nendoroid Generation	Miruhio · F · Biscotti ミルヒオーレ・F・ビスコッティ	PSP	
2012	Shining Blade	Touka	PSP	
2012	Even in the game, Listen to Me Girls, I'm Your Father!	Raika Oda	PSP	
2012	Kono Bushitsu wa Kitaku Shinai Bu ga Senkyo Shimashita ja:この部室は帰宅しない部が占拠しました。	Kitaki Koi-ko	PSP	
2012	Bakemonogatari	Tsubasa Hanekawa	PSP	
2012	Aquapazza	Multi	PS3	
2012	Girl Friend Beta	Miss Monochrome, Tōko Mashiro	mobile, Also Summer Vacation in 2015	
2012	Ima Sugu Oniichan ni Imōto da tte Iitai!	Ryoko Mitani	PC, PS Vita, also in 2014	
2012	Dead or Alive 5	Hitomi	Arcade, PS3, Xbox 360	
2012	Persona 4 Golden	Chie Satonaka	PS Vita	
2012–14	Fairy Tail games	Carla	Various platforms	
2012	Otome Break	Supika Saotome	iPhone/Android	
2013	The Pet Girl of Sakurasou	Ryunosuke Akasaka	PSP, PS Vita	
2013	Horizon in the Middle of Nowhere	Mary	PC, PSP, PS3, mobile	
2013	Summon Night 5	Manager	PSP	
2013	Girls x Magic ガールズ×マジック	Saori Hayase 早瀬紫織	other	
2013	Seishun Hajimemashita! ja:青春はじめました！	Chitose Futaba	PSP	
2013	The Legend of Heroes: Trails of Cold Steel games	Alisa Reinford	PS3, PS Vita, also II	
2013	Dead or Alive 5 Ultimate	Hitomi	Arcade, PS3, Xbox 360	
2013	Rage of Bahamut	Tina	iOS, Android	
2013	Lord of Vermillion III	Julia	Arcade	
2014	Akaya akashiya ayakashino あかやあかしやあやかしの	Tsuitachi 朔	PSP	
2014–15	Magi: The Labyrinth of Magic games	Yamuraiha	Various platforms	
2014	Golden Time Vivid Memories	Kōko Kaga	PS Vita	
2014	Persona Q: Shadow of the Labyrinth	Chie Satonaka	3DS	
2014	Persona 4 Arena Ultimax	Chie Satonaka	Various platforms	
2014	Gakuen K - Wonderful School Days	Anna Kushina	PSP, also V Edition in 2015	
2014	Dengeki Bunko: Fighting Climax	Kōko Kaga	PS3, PS Vita, also Ignition in 2015	
2014	Rail Wars!	Iina Nana 飯田奈々	other	
2014	Schoolgirl Strikers	Noel-Jaune Beart ノエル=ジョーヌ・ベアール(愛称：ノエル)	Android, iOS	
2014	Kantai Collection	Mamiya, Irako, Asagumo, Yamagumo, Amagi	PC	
2014	Super Heroine Chronicle	Tesla Violet, Siesta	PS3, PS Vita	
2014	Puyo Puyo Tetris	Ess	3DS, Wii U, Nintendo Switch, PS3, PS4, PS Vita, Xbox One	
2014	Gakuen K -Wonderful School Days-	Anna	PSP	
2014	Gattai RPG majo no nīna to tsuchikure no senshi	Lily	Android, iOS	
2014	Gold Rebellion	Iseberu	Android, iOS	
2014	Judas Code	May Yasoshima	PS Vita	
2014	Nagare sen kei en kauntā Second Season	Meteor Officer	Android, iOS	
2014	Thousand Memories	Norun	Android, iOS	
2014	White Cat Project	Iris	Android, iOS	
2015	Princess Connect!	Saren / Saren Sasaki 佐々木咲恋	Android, iOS	
2015	Dead or Alive 5 Last Round	Hitomi	Various platforms	
2015	Cross Ange: Rondo of Angels and Dragons tr.	Salamandine		
2015	Stella Glow	Marie	Nintendo 3DS	
2015	Persona 4: Dancing All Night	Chie Satonaka	PS Vita	
2015	7th Dragon III: Code CFD	Ifel / Hypnos / Character Voice アイテル/ヒュプノス/キャラクターボイス	DS	
2015	Song of First Love	Kyoko Hikawa	Android, iOS	
2015	Picture book studio	Narrator	Android, iOS	
2016	Koyomimonogatari	Tsubasa Hanekawa		
2016	Summon Night 6	Ladiria ラディリア		
2016	Wand of Fortune R ja:ワンド オブ フォーチュン R	Lulu ルル		
2016	Girls' Frontline	Springfield, Kolibri	Android, IOS	
2016	Dead or Alive Xtreme 3	Hitomi	Fortune and Venus	
2016	Tales of Berseria	Teresa Linares	PS3, PS4	
2016	Sengoku Otome: Legend Battle	Thousand Likyuu 千リキュウ		
2017	The Alchemist Code	Ouroboros	Android, iOS	
2017	Azur Lane	HMS Belfast (C35), Belchan, USS North Carolina (BB-55)	Android, iOS	
2017	Honkai Impact 3rd	Ai-Chan, Ai Hyperion Λ	Android, PC, iOS	
2018	Langrisser Mobile	Cherie, Freya	Android, iOS	
2018	Magia Record	Mitama Yakumo, Tart/Jeanne d'Arc, Tsubasa Hanekawa	Android, iOS	
2018	Princess Connect! Re:Dive	Saren / Saren Sasaki	Android, iOS, Windows	
2018	BlazBlue: Cross Tag Battle	Chie Satonaka	PC, PS4, Switch	
2018	Fate/Grand Order	Oryō, Charlotte Corday	Android	
2019	Granblue Fantasy	Kumbhira	Android, iOS, Browser	
2019	Dead or Alive 6	Hitomi	Various platforms	
2019	Fantasy Life Online	Haku	Android/iOS	
2019	Grand Chase: Dimensional Chaser	Nelia Ironwood	Android/iOS	
2020	Moe! Ninja Girls RPG	Ran Kuzuryu	Android, iOS	
2020	Arknights	Surtr	Android, iOS	
2021	Alchemy Stars	Zoya, Barbara	Android, iOS	
2021	Cookie Run: Kingdom	Cotton Cookie	Android, iOS	
2021	Identity V	"Memory"/"Little Girl", Alice DeRoss/Journalist/Reporter	Android, iOS, PC	
2022	Counter: Side	Jaina Kropel/Replacer Queen	Android/iOS, Windows	
2022	Goddess of Victory: Nikke	Maiden/Miranda	Android/iOS	
2022	Genshin Impact	Faruzan	Android/iOS, Windows, PlayStation	
2023	Blue Archive	Mine Aomori	Android/iOS	
2023	Uma Musume: Pretty Derby	Mei Satake	Android/iOS, Windows	
2023	Master Detective Archives: Rain Code	Pucci Lavmin	Nintendo Switch	
2023	Crymachina	Noein		
2025	Stella Sora	Shia	Android/iOS, Windows	
2026	Arknights: Endfield	Laevatain	Android/iOS, Windows, PS5	
2026	Nekopara: Sekai Connect	Suiren	Android/iOS, Windows	

! Title ! Role ! class="unsortable"| Notes ! class="unsortable"| Source |- |2023 |Racing Master |Suou Tamako | | |} -->

== Discography ==
All releases are under King Records, sub-label Starchild, unless otherwise noted.

=== Studio albums ===
List of albums, with selected chart positions
Year	Title	Catalogue Number (Japan)	Oricon	
Year	Title	Catalogue Number (Japan)	Peak position	Weeks charted
2000	Mizutamari ni Utsuru Sekai	KICS-834	–	–
2001	Kuroneko to Tsuki Kikyū o Meguru Bōken	KICS-930	–	–
2003	sky	KICS-1030	–	–
2004	Rakuen	KICS-1077	–	–
2005	Usotsuki Alice to Kujiragō o Meguru Bōken	KICS-1201	20	4
2008	Darling	KICS-1355	8	5
2009	Honey Jet	KICS-1478	10	5
2012	Himitsu (秘密)	KICS-1737	3	6
2015	World End no Niwa (ワールドエンドの庭)	KICS-3122	5	7
2019	Bungaku Shōjo no Kashu (文学少女の歌集)	KICS-3805	8	

=== Compilation albums ===
List of albums, with selected chart positions
Year	Title	Catalogue Number (Japan)	Oricon	
Year	Title	Catalogue Number (Japan)	Peak position	Weeks charted
2003	Ho?	KICA-599	–	–
2012	Best Album	KICS-1819	11	6

=== Singles ===
List of singles, with selected chart positions
Year	Title	Oricon		Album
Year	Title	Peak position	Weeks charted	Album
1998	"my best friend" released via Pony Canyon	–	–	Ho?
1999	"brand-new communication" released via Pony Canyon.	–	–	–
2001	"Love Destiny"	–	–	Kuroneko to Tsuki Kikyū o Meguru Bōken
2002	"Kirari Takaramono" (キラリ☆宝物)	–	–	Ho?
2002	"All My Love"	–	–	sky
2004	"Kokoro Harete Yo mo Akete" (心晴れて 夜も明けて)	–	–	Rakuen
2004	"Scramble" (with Unscandal) (スクランブル)	–	–	Usotsuki Alice to Kujiragō o Meguru Bōken
2006	"Hikari" (ヒカリ)	5	11	Darling
2007	"Days"	8	8	Darling
2007	"Koisuru Tenkizu" (恋する天気図)	14	5	Darling
2007	"Nano Desu" (恋する天気図)	14	5	Higurashi no Naku Koro ni Kai ~Character Case Book~ Vol. 1
2008	"Vanilla Salt"	7	9	Honey Jet!!
2009	"Silky Heart"	9	9	Honey Jet!!
2009	"Ai no sora" (愛の空)	46	3	–
2009	"Yahho!!"	12	5	Himitsu
2011	"Immoralist" (インモラリスト)	8	11	Himitsu
2011	"Presenter"	9	7	Himitsu
2012	"Coloring"	11	8	Himitsu
2012	"Natsu no Yakusoku" (夏の約束)	12	13	Best Album
2013	"Golden Time"	19	8	World End no Niwa
2014	"Poker Face" (ポーカーフェイス)	16	4	–
2014	"The World's End"	9	6	World End no Niwa
2014	"Watashi dake no monogatari" (私だけの物語)	18	4	–
2015	"Stay With Me"	13	3	World End no Niwa
2015	"Asymmetry" (アシンメトリー)	12	7	–

=== Drama CDs ===
Year	Title	Role	Notes	Source
1998	MPD Psycho Sound Story	Kotomi Amano 天野琴美		
1999	Trigger トリガー	Kay ケイ	Radio	
2001	Spiral	Rio Takeuchi		
2001	Chrono Crusade III -The Time of the Beginning-	Fiore Harvenheit		
2002	Nanaka 6/17	Nanaka Kirisato	3 volumes	
2003	Tensho Yao's fall ja:天正やおよろず	Jinki 迅伐		
2004	Nagasarete Airantō	Suzu		
2004	The Gentlemen's Alliance Cross	Ushio Amamiya		
2005	Purism × Egoist – Ponwari School Days	Pizu ピズ		
2005	Chitose Get You!!	Chitose Sakuraba!		
2006	Aquarian Age	弓削遙		
2008–12	Higurashi When They Cry games	Hanyu		
2009	Winter Sonata series	Jung Yoo Jin		
2009	Hyakumonogatari	Tsubasa Hanekawa		
2009	Love Lab	Natsuo Maki		
2010	I, Otariman. ja:ぼく、オタリーマン	Library members 図書委員		
2010	MM!	Arashiko Yuno		
2011	Omae no go hōshi wa sono teido ka? ja:お前のご奉仕はその程度か?	Sara Wand Flower 沙羅野王花		
2012	Kisei Kanojo Sana ja:寄生彼女サナ	Sana		
	Mamotte Shugogetten! Reunion again	Hi 飛		
	Argento Soma	Sue Harris		
	Crescent Noise	Kagura Yayoi		
	Da Capo	Kotori Shirakawa		
	Dog Days	Milhiore F. Biscotti		
	Futakoi Drama Album Twinkle Bright			
	Hanasaki Komachi Girls	Haruki Momoko		
	Idolmaster Xenoglossia	Hagiwara Yukiho		
	Kanon	Ayu Tsukimiya		
	Love Hina	Naru Narusegawa		
	Pani Poni	Miyako Uehara	Pani Poni Dash; Pani Poni Second Season	
	Photon	Aun Freya		
	Sword World Heppoko Boukentai	Iriina		
	YuruYuri	Akane Akaza		
	Yuukyuu Gensoukyoku "Yuukyuu Ongakusai"			
	Yuukyuu Gensoukyoku 3 Perpetual Blue			

== Videography ==
Title (English)	Title (Japanese)	Release & Format	Notes
Yui Horie CLIPS 0 〜since'00〜'01〜		July 29, 2002; VHS	Contains promotional videos for 3 singles, the making-of, and an interview
Yui Horie CLIPS 1		April 28, 2004; DVD	Promotional videos for singles
Live DVD 2006 "The Adventure Over Yui Horie"	Live DVD 2006 "堀江由衣をめぐる冒険"	July 26, 2006; DVD	
Yui Horie Christmas Live; ~ Yui is Chakugae Santa ~	堀江由衣 クリスマスライブ ～由衣がサンタに着がえたら～	June 4, 2008; DVD	Includes a CD Single for Happy Snow
Yui Horie CLIPS 2	–	January 1, 2010; DVD & Blu-ray	Promotional videos for singles
The Adventure Over Yui Horie II; ~Budoukan of Butoukai~ Q & A	堀江由衣をめぐる冒険2 ～武道館で舞踏会～ Q & A	May 12, 2010; DVD & Blu-ray	
The Adventure Over Yui Horie III; Secret Mission Tour	堀江由衣をめぐる冒険? ～Secret Mission Tour～	December 26, 2012; DVD & Blu-ray	
Horie Yui Best Live; Yui and the Time Thief	堀江由衣ベストライブ ～由衣と時間泥棒～	September 20, 2013; DVD & Blu-ray	A special one-off concert for fans that had bought both the BEST ALBUM & the 15th single (PRESENTER). The 6000~ tickets were issued via a lottery.
The Adventure Over Yui Horie IV; Pirates Of Yui 3013	堀江由衣をめぐる冒険 ～パイレーツ・オブ・ユイ3013～	December 25, 2013; DVD & Blu-ray	

== Bibliography ==
- Kingyobachi Puranetto (金魚鉢プラネット) (2000)
- Sutoroberī Biyori (ストロベリー日和) (2001)
- Horie Yui o Meguru Bōken Bōken no Sho (堀江由衣をめぐる冒険冒険の書。。) (2006)
- Sora Sanpo Biyori (空散步日和) (2009)
- Kirakira Mitsubachi o Meguru Boken: # 1–70 (堀江由衣キラキラみつばちをめぐる冒険: # 1–70) (2012)
