= Dragon Crisis! =

Japanese light novel series

- Cover of the first volume of the Dragon Crisis! light novel series

ドラゴンクライシス! (Doragon Kuraishisu!)
- Genre: Action, Fantasy, Romantic comedy
- Light novel
- Written by: Kaya Kizaki
- Illustrated by: Itsuki Akata
- Published by: Shueisha
- Imprint: Super Dash Bunko
- Original run: January 25, 2007 – March 25, 2011
- Volumes: 13
- Anime television series
- Directed by: Hideki Tachibana
- Written by: Hideyuki Kurata
- Music by: Makoto Miyazaki
- Studio: Studio Deen
- Original network: Chiba TV, Chukyo TV, KIDS STATION, Tochigi TV, Tokyo MX, TV Kanagawa, TV Saitama, Yomiuri TV
- Original run: January 11, 2011 – March 29, 2011
- Episodes: 12

Dragon Crisis! (Japanese: ドラゴンクライシス!, Hepburn: Doragon Kuraishisu!) is a Japanese light novel series by Kaya Kizaki, with illustrations by Itsuki Akata. As of March 2011, thirteen volumes have been published by Shueisha under their Super Dash Bunko imprint. An anime adaptation by Studio Deen aired in 2011.

== Plot ==
The series revolves around Ryūji Kisaragi, a seemingly ordinary teenager who is living a peaceful life while also attending high school. However, his peaceful life gets interrupted after his second cousin, Eriko returns from abroad. With no time to waste, Eriko drags Ryūji to a black marketing organization called Fang, led by an evil black dragon named Onyx. They steal a large relic box from the criminals.

After opening the box, Eriko and Ryūji find a young, girl-like dragon with long, blonde hair and sparkling blue eyes. The girl instantly recognizes Ryūji and becomes attracted to him. They decide to name the girl Rose, due to the rose-like pattern on her left hand. Suddenly, the very same organization who kept Rose captive arrive to take her back. But Ryūji is not ready to let her go without a fight!

From that moment on, Ryūji and Eriko embark on an unexpected adventure as they strive to protect Rose from Fang and other evil people who are after her. Ryūji relies on his powers as a Level 10 breaker to fend off assailants. On the way, they meet other dragons who share troubled relationships with each other along with a research group called the Society. Also, Ryūji comes face to face with a truth long kept hidden from him since his birth.

== Characters ==
Ryūji Kisaragi (如月 竜司, Kisaragi Ryūji)
Voiced by: Hiro Shimono
Ryūji is a 15 year old boy and the series' main protagonist. His parents are Lost Precious hunters like the rest of his family and since they are often away from home, he lives mostly on his own. He meets Rose after rescuing her from Fang with the help of his cousin Eriko. At first, he cannot explain why Rose knows him; however, he eventually remembers a vague memory of seeing Rose hatch from her egg when he was much younger and her saving him from an untimely death. Ryūji is a Level 10 Breaker, the most skilled of those who search for and use Lost Precious'. Besides Ryūji, there are only seven other Level 10 breakers in the world, all older than he is. As the story progresses, Ryūji is recognized by some of the dragons as Rose's fiancé, although this is due to a misunderstanding. Ryūji has feelings for Rose and does care about her. This is evident when he first "Engaged" with Rose, which allowed him to borrow Rose's power and achieve unbelievable power. Ryūji begins to feel embarrassed around Rose after he performs the dragon's coming of age ceremony with Rose (a simple kiss on the dragon scale birthmark on her hand). According to Onyx, Ryūji is not human, but the corporeal form of a Lost Precious called "Dragon Crisis" that can exert a great influence over dragons, thus he is able to wield the Lost Precious "Slash Breath" – a powerful weapon made from a dragon tooth and feared by all dragons. Onyx also claims that this is the reason why Rose became weaker after performing the coming of age ceremony with him. This is later proven to be false by Maruga; it was all a ploy set up by Onyx to get Rose from him. After Onyx is defeated, he returns to school life alongside his friends.
Notably, Ryūji means "Dragon Ruler", in Japanese.

Rose (ローズ, Rōzu)
Voiced by: Rie Kugimiya
Little is known about Rose beyond the fact that she is a young dragon, and that she originates from the highlands of Albania plus she is unable to transform. Prior to the series, she is captured and sealed in a relic box by the crime syndicate Fang. While transporting the case to their leader Onyx, Ryūji and Eriko steal it from the criminals and release her. She knows nothing but Ryūji's name, but soon picks up a few words. Since she is unable to communicate at first, Ryūji gives her the name Rose because the dragon scales on the back of her left hand resemble a rose. Rose is aggressive towards nearly everyone except Ryūji, to whom she clings, even insisting on sleeping beside him in his bed. She deeply loves Ryūji, but is unsure of his feelings for her. Rose and Ryūji first met when he was young. He found her when she hatched from her egg and Eriko believes that she fell in love with him at first sight. Later, some of the dragons acknowledged Ryūji as Rose's fiancé due to misunderstanding of the term "Engage". After Ryūji kisses her birthmark as part of her coming of age ritual, Rose becomes flustered and embarrassed around him. When she becomes inexplicably weaker after the ritual. Onyx claims that it is because Ryūji is the corporeal form of the Lost Precious "Dragon Crisis". In the final episode, Maruga reveals that this was a lie and that Rose was sick because her intense feelings for Ryūji manifested themselves physically; Onyx set the whole thing up in order to take Rose for himself, having also wiped her memories of Ryūji to ensure that she remains with him. Ryūji's group later stop Onyx's escape and help restore Rose's memories. Following Onyx's defeat, she now attends school alongside Ryūji.
Eriko Nanao (七尾 英理子, Nanao Eriko)
Voiced by: Yukana
Ryūji's busty 19-year-old second cousin and a Level 7 Breaker. She has been studying abroad for some time, but returns to Japan to intercept a Lost Precious that Fang will be transporting through the city docks. Despite the danger of taking anything that Fang believes is theirs, she does not back down because she believes the contents, which she suspects to be an S rank Lost Precious, will prove her worth to the other Lost Precious hunters, but what was in the case is actually a young girl that would later be named Rose. Initially unable to identify what or who Rose is, she is shocked when she discovers that Rose is a Red Dragon. She wields a staff that can create luminescent butterflies or fireflies, which can blind or stun opponents. It is revealed that her staff is a Lost Precious that once belonged to a magician. Following the defeat of the evil black dragon Onyx, she attends school along with Ryūji and Rose.
Misaki Etō (江藤 実咲, Etō Misaki)
Voiced by: Mayako Nigo
Ryūji's classmate. She has feelings for Ryūji, but is shy whenever she is around him, making it hard for her to approach him casually and express her feelings. Also, she has little to no success in getting his attention. She is in shock after misunderstanding Ryūji and Rose being engaged, but is nevertheless supportive towards them. At the end of the series, she still makes attempts to win Ryūji over.
Maruga (マルガ)
Voiced by: Yui Horie
A dragon whom Ryuji' meets during his trip to the beach. She is the princess of the ice dragons. Initially, she has a haughty attitude towards Ryuji, but she warms up towards him. It is implied that she likes Ryuji, as she blushes when Ryuji is around. She asks Ryuji for a favor – to take a cursed Lost Precious from another Level 10 Breaker, George Evans. After the incident, she shows up in the last two episodes of the anime, where she convinces Ryuji to go save Rose after the black dragon Onyx tricks him into handing her over. Since Onyx used to live in her land, they have known each other since childhood, but it does not mean they are friends. Following Onyx's defeat at the hands of Ryūji and Rose, she starts attending school with Ryūji and his friends.
Ai (アイ)
Voiced by: Yuka Inokuchi
She is 15 years old and is a famous thief of Lost Preciouses, called Odd Eye (because of her one golden eye). Her tattoo is really a Lost Precious which allows her to transform into a half-wolf. Furumori (Ai's master) placed it inside her as an experiment in integrating a person and a Lost Precious, and trains her to be a thief. She was taken from her home by Furumori and grew up believing that her family was dead and that she was born a half-wolf. She later finds out that Furumori lied to her with the help of a Lost Precious that allows her to hear a person's true thoughts and rebels against him before he dies in battle against Ryuji, who then reveals that she was only a tool to him; despite this, Ai shows pity for him before his death. After her story arc, she finds and returns to her real parents after learning from the Society that they are still alive, but also chooses to keep her abilities. She likes Ryuji for saving her from her life of thievery as well as accepting her unusual appearance and continues to visit him in later episodes. After she and her friends defeat Onyx, she attends school alongside them. Her birthname is Aika.
Onyx (オニキス, Onikisu)
Voiced by: Hiroshi Kamiya
Onyx is a black dragon who uses black magic and the series' main antagonist. He is also a wanted man hunted by the Society. He claims to be Rose's fiancé, but only wishes to marry her for his own gain. He is the leader of the crime syndicate Fang. Five years ago, he met Sapphie and became her fiancé. He later had his men capture Rose and deliver her to him, but Ryūji and Eriko steal the case containing her from them when they mistaken her for an S rank Lost Precious, forcing him to retrieve Rose himself. However, Rose chooses not to marry him, earning his wrath as he disapproves of humans and dragons living together. Ryūji defeats him with Rose's help, forcing him to retreat. He later makes another attempt to get Rose by staging her age ritual so to wipe her memories of Ryūji and escape Japan with her and Sapphie, but his deception is revealed by Maruga while Sapphie turns on Onyx (albert without him knowing) as she is unwilling to support Onyx's misdeeds any further, leading Ryūji and his friends to go after him and get Rose back. In the final confrontation, he is killed by Ryūji and Rose's powerful magic that they unleash upon kissing each other, ending his and Fang's reign of terror for good.
Sapphie (サフィ, Safi)
Voiced by: Emiri Kato
A blue dragon girl who seeks to find love. She has lived with Onyx since hatching five years previously. She is jealous of Rose for taking the attention of Onyx away from her. She is also Onyx's fiancée; however, Onyx doesn't like her as much as Rose. She has power over water, but has very little control over it, so her attempts to use water typically end up backfiring on her. Sometime after befriending Rose, her loyalty to Onyx diminishes, eventually leading her to secretly betray him after seeing how antagonistic he is with his determination to get Rose. After Onyx's defeat, she attends school along with Ryūji, Rose, Maruga, Eriko, Bianca, and Ai, all while attempting to find another lover. At that point, Ryūji's classmate Masato seems to have developed feelings for her.
Kai
Onyx's assistant. She is very calm in most situations and loyal to her boss. Following Onyx's defeat, she becomes Ryuji's new teacher.
Bianca Alexandra Lou
Bianca is a young scientist who works for the Society. She comes to Ryuji's school to evaluate him and later befriends him. She is also a big fan of Ryuji's parents. In the final episode, she starts attending school alongside Ryūji and his friends.
Furumori
A criminal and Ai's master who, like Onyx, is also a wanted man hunted by the Society. He also goes by the name Saiki and possesses five Lost Preciouses. Prior to the events of the series, he kidnaps Ai, uses a Lost Precious to turn her into a half-wolf, and trains her into becoming a thief, all while lying to her that her family has died and that she was born as a half-wolf. He only pretended to care for her so that he can use her for his own gain. Once she learns that truth, she turns on him and after being defeated, he commits suicide by dissolving into the atmosphere.
George Evans
A Level 10 Breaker who considers all dragons to be a threat, even though he had never seen one personally. After learning from Kai that Rose and Maruga are dragons and being influenced by a cursed Lost Precious, he becomes dangerously hostile until being freed by Ryūji. Afterwards, he finally lets go of his hatred of dragons. He has feelings for Maruga.
Tokura
A Society researcher who studies dragons and Lost Preciouses. He is good friends with Ryuji and Eriko and even helped them defeat Onyx.
Masato
One of Ryuji's classmates. In the final episode, he appears to have developed a crush on Sapphie.
Mao
Another one of Ryuji's classmates. She always tries to help Misaki win over Ryuji.
Ryūji's Parents
They are a pair of Lost Precious hunters who are always away from home searching for Lost Preciouses, leaving their son on his own. They debut in the final episode where they help take down the black dragon Onyx.

== Anime ==
Dragon Crisis! was adapted into a 12-episode anime television series by Studio Deen under the direction of Hideki Tachibana and with screenplay by Hideyuki Kurata. The series began its broadcast run on Chiba TV on January 11, 2011, and was scheduled to end on March 29, 2011. However, the last three episodes were temporarily put on hold after a 9.0 earthquake and tsunami struck Japan on March 11. The series was rebroadcast by Chukyo TV, KIDS STATION, Tochigi TV, Tokyo MX, TV Kanagawa, TV Saitama and Yomiuri TV days later and simulcast by Crunchyroll to audiences in Australia, Europe, North America, and South America.

=== Episode list ===
No.	Title	Original release date
1	"The Abducted Girl"; Transliteration: "Sarawareta Shōjo" (Japanese: さらわれた少女)	January 11, 2011
High school student Ryuji's older cousin Eriko returns from abroad to drag him to the scene of an underground transaction where he gets caught up in a shootout and car chase after stealing a case from a group of criminal brokers called Fang. While they thought they had stolen a miraculous Lost Precious, the case actually contains a mysterious young girl, who is released from the case after it was broken open by a stray bullet. The young girl helps them escape by using her powers to destroy their pursuers. Once back at Ryuji's apartment, she happily latches on to Ryuji, even though they have never met. Ryuji names the girl Rose. Who is this little girl? Thus begins the romance story of the beautiful young Rose and Ryuji.
2	"The Black Assault"; Transliteration: "Kuro no Shūgeki" (Japanese: 黒の襲撃)	January 18, 2011
Rose, Ryuji and Eriko are suddenly invited to a Japanese branch called the Society by a researcher named Tokura. While Rose is indistinguishable from a young girl, the Society performs a variety of examinations after hearing she is a dragon, and the results are...! Unconcerned by her situation, Rose is simply happy to be with Ryuji, and enjoys eating ice cream. However, a young man in black named Onyx (who is Fang's leader) and his assistant Kai have come for Rose!
3	"Contract of Determination"; Transliteration: "Ketsui no Keiyaku" (Japanese: 決意の契約)	January 25, 2011
Determined to rescue Rose, Ryuji takes possession of a powerful Lost Precious left to him by his parents. Onyx, on the other hand, claims that Rose is meant to marry him because her collar signifies their engagement, and has arranged a wedding for them. After storming Fang's stronghold with Eriko and Tokura to stop him from marrying Rose, Ryuji destroys Rose's collar while Rose chooses not to go through with the marriage. Onyx, revealed to be a black dragon and is resentful towards the idea of humans and dragons coexisting, attacks them in his true form. Ryuji finds out that Onyx is more than he can handle by himself, until Rose joins forces with him to confront the enemy. They engage and Rose lends her power to Ryuji, allowing him to severely hurt Onyx and destroy his hideout. Onyx retreats, but Eriko and Ryuji believes that Onyx is still alive and may be planning to return.
4	"Beautiful Girl of the Beach"; Transliteration: "Umibe no Bishōjo" (Japanese: 海辺の美少女)	February 1, 2011
While taking a vacation at the beach. Ryuji and Rose are approached by Maruga, the empress of the white dragons who asks for their help to recover a Lost Precious in possession of George Evans, a powerful broker who believes that dragons are an evil to be vanquished, despite that he never actually met one in person. Ryuji, Rose and the others go to a festival and coincidentally meet George. After some trouble comes up to the festival Ryuji, Rose, and Maruga escape up a flight of stairs with George right behind them. The episode ends when George looks at Maruga and falls in love, still not knowing the fact that she and Rose are dragons.
5	"Unpleasant Awakening"; Transliteration: "Imawashiki Kakusei" (Japanese: 忌まわしき覚醒)	February 8, 2011
Ryuji learns from Maruga that the sword in George's possession is actually a cursed Lost Precious that corrupts human souls. Rose refuses to believe that George, a usually kind person could become an enemy, but when he finds that Rose is a dragon (with some assistance from Kai), he starts attacking her, and it is up to Ryuji and Rose to bring him back to his senses.
6	"Wolf Attack"; Transliteration: "Ōkami no Shūgeki" (Japanese: 狼の襲撃)	February 15, 2011
Ryuji, Eriko and Rose attend a party with many A class and above Lost Preciouses. They also meet a new collector who seems interested in Eriko; he tells her that if he finds out anything about her other earring, then he will contact her. The guests are attacked by "Odd Eye", a half-beast Lost Precious thief whom Ryuji had just seen in a magazine. She steals all the Lost Preciouses, except for Eriko's earring, which is foiled by Ryuji at the last second. Later at their home, she tries to steal Eriko's earring a second time, but is caught by Ryuji. She tries to escape, but ends up tied to Ryuji by a failed capture device used by Eriko. While waiting for the binding to vanish, they learn that her true name is Ai, and try to figure out who is making her steal, and why. While interrogating her, they end up taking a bath together after making a mess, to their embarrassment. The next day, Eriko answers a knock on the door; it is the new collector who says he has found the other earring. He opens the box supposedly containing the earring, but it releases a sleeping powder which puts Eriko and Rose to sleep. Revealed to be Ai's master, he then tells Ai to follow him, putting Ryuji to sleep as well, taking both him and Eriko's earring with them.
7	"The Truth about Wolves"; Transliteration: "Ōkami-tachi no Shinjitsu" (Japanese: 狼たちの真実)	February 22, 2011
The rope finally came off of Ryuji and Ai. Ai's master puts him in a closed room to ask him of his A-Class precious later. He and Ai then go to a room where he tells Ai to rest for a while. It is also revealed here that her master does actually have the other "True Love" (トル ラ-ブ）earring. Ai's master leaves the room to go get some drinks and Ai, dazzled by the beauty of the earrings, puts them on, soon realizing that the "True Love" earrings, when used together, give the person wearing them the ability to hear a person's true thoughts. Ai's master comes back and, not knowing that she put on the earrings, answers all of Ai's questions falsely, unintentionally "telling" her that he kidnapped her 15 years ago and raised her to be a dog for his experiments, having never cared for her at all. Knowing this, Ai ends her allegiance with her master and flees the room to free Ryuji as Ai's master attempts to stop them. They escape to the balcony where Eriko and Rose come just in time to help. It is revealed that Ai's master is Furumori, a person being looked for by the Society, and he has five Lost Preciouses inside of his body. After having four out of five of these Lost Preciouses destroyed by Rose's dragon fire, Furumori admits defeat and uses his last Lost Precious to disappear into the atmosphere, killing himself. Tokura arrives to take Ai back to her human family where she was kidnapped from after informing her that they are alive and well.
8	"Risked Test"; Transliteration: "Kiken na Tesuto" (Japanese: 危険なテスト)	March 1, 2011
Ryuji wakes up finding Rose dressed up in his school's girl uniform saying she wants to go to school too. Ryuji agrees but makes her promise that she won't use her wings and fire. When they get to school, class is suddenly disrupted by Bianca Alexandra Lou, a woman sent by the Society to evaluate Ryuji. She fires a SMAW at Ryuji and finds his physical level is 326 and his Lost Precious Level is 120. She seems slightly disappointed and says she will test his maximum lost precious level later. After a whole bunch of questioning, Bianca takes Ryuji outside to start the test. Ryuji needs to battle a Neogolem. After Ryuji severely hurts it and the Neogolem still doesn't shut down, Bianca realizes that there's something wrong with it and tries to automatically shut it down when it doesn't work, she climbs up the robot trying to shut it down manually. Ryuji and Rose engage and stop the Neogolem. At the same time all this happens, Misaki figures out it's Ryuji's birthday the day after and tries to figure out what to get him for his birthday present.
9	"Mirror of Truth"; Transliteration: "Shinjitsu no Kagami" (Japanese: 真実の鏡)	March 8, 2011
Rose, Misaki, Eriko, and Ai all get sucked into a Cursed Lost Precious that judges whether women tell the truth or not. Meanwhile, Bianca and Ryuji try to help them escape.
10	"Adult's Rites"; Transliteration: "Otona no Gishiki" (Japanese: オトナの儀式)	March 15, 2011 (Note: Episode 10 was put on hold as a result of the 2011 Tōhoku earthquake and tsunami.)
A new blue dragon named Sapphie appears and claims to be the lover of Onyx (revealed to be still alive) and tries to take revenge on Ryuji. However, it turns out that she is not too battle oriented and is forced to retreat. Misaki learns about Rose being a dragon and over in Maruga's home, a break in by Onyx occurs. Sapphie later meets up with Rose and they become friends. She teaches her of the dragon's coming of age ritual, namely a kiss on the dragon mark. Rose and Ryuji perform the rite, only to have Rose become extremely conscious of Ryuji's presence (with the mere touch or sight of Ryuji sending waves of heat through her body) which in turn makes Ryuji conscious of her. The couple end up shy and embarrassed around each other to an extreme.
11	"Dragon Crisis"; Transliteration: "Doragon Kuraishisu" (Japanese: ドラゴンクライシス)	March 22, 2011
Rose's change in attitude continues even after a night's sleep. This in turn, much to Eriko's dismay, makes the couple awkward around each other. At school, Rose tries to consult Misaki and Ryuji vaguely tries the same with Masato, but to no avail. Rose's condition gets worse during PE, to the point where she collapses. She is transferred to the Society's Dragon Lab. Meanwhile Eriko and Bianca manage to capture Sapphie, who had returned to regain her shoes that she had left behind. Questioning her reveals that Rose's condition is not normal and Sapphie herself does not understand what's going on. Onyx contacts Ryuji and reveals to him that the Dragon's Rite of Adult does not take effect with humans, but only with dragon partners and that Rose's current condition is because Ryuji is not human, but a Lost Precious with power over dragons called the "Dragon Crisis". If Ryuji continues to stay near Rose, her condition will only worsen. Left with no choice, Ryuji hands Rose over to Onyx. More than two weeks later, Ryuji goes to and acts normal in school, but Misaki realizes that Ryuji is hiding his own feelings. Later that night, Maruga return to talk with Ryuji.
12	"Engage"; Transliteration: "Engēji" (Japanese: エンゲージ)	March 29, 2011
Rose wakes up with no memories about her life with Ryuji and her friends. Not willing to take any chances, Onyx and Kai decide to leave Japan with her and Sapphie to the dragons' homeland as soon as possible to ensure that she can never remember. Meanwhile, thanks to Maruga's counseling and suspecting that Onyx was lying to them about Rose's condition just so he can keep Rose for himself (revealing that the age ritual and Rose's condition was all a setup), Ryuji finally comes to terms with his feelings for Rose and together with Eriko and Maruga, he sets to Haneda Airport to rescue her after being tipped off by Sapphie, who is no longer willing to help Onyx. Joined by Ai (who was informed by Misaki), Tokura, and the Society, they stop Onyx's private jet from taking off. While Onyx is distracted by the soldiers, Ryuji, Ai, Eriko, and Maruga board the plane, seemly crushing Onyx in the process, and help Rose remember her life. Having survived, Onyx attempts to escape Japan by carrying the plane in his dragon form. Ryuji's parents halt his escape as Bianca asks for their autograph. Rose and Ryuji then kiss, unleashing a powerful blast of energy that destroys Onyx (who is somewhat impressed by this power just before his demise), but this causes the two to fall unconscious. After recovering, they return to a not so ordinary school life along with Eriko, Ai, Maruga, Bianca, and Sapphie. Misaki still struggles to find a way to win Ryuji's heart while Kai becomes their new teacher. Meanwhile, Tokura watches them from a hidden camera and is amazed by how humans and dragons are living together.

=== Music ===
The opening theme of the anime is "Immoralist" (インモラリスト) by Yui Horie, and the ending theme is "Mirai Bowl" (ミライボウル) by Momoiro Clover.
