= Love Hina =

Japanese manga series

- First tankōbon volume cover, featuring Kitsune and Shinobu (left), Naru (center), and Motoko and Su (right)

ラブ ひな (Rabu Hina)
- Genre: Harem; Romantic comedy; Slice of life
- Manga
- Written by: Ken Akamatsu
- Published by: Kodansha
- English publisher: AUS: Madman Entertainment; NA: Kodansha Comics; Tokyopop (former); SG: Chuang Yi
- Imprint: Shōnen Magazine Comics
- Magazine: Weekly Shōnen Magazine
- Original run: October 21, 1998 – October 31, 2001
- Volumes: 14
- Anime television series
- Directed by: Yoshiaki Iwasaki
- Produced by: Shinichi Ikeda; Keisuke Iwata; Yukinao Shimoji
- Written by: Kurō Hazuki
- Music by: Koichi Korenaga
- Studio: Xebec
- Licensed by: AUS: Madman Entertainment; NA: Funimation; UK: MVM Films
- Original network: TXN (TV Tokyo)
- Original run: April 19, 2000 – September 27, 2000
- Episodes: 24 + OVA
Further information
Original video animation
Love Hina X'Mas Special: Silent Eve
Directed by	Yoshiaki Iwasaki
Produced by	Shinichi Ikeda; Yukinao Shimoji; Fukashi Azuma
Written by	Kurō Hazuki
Music by	Koichi Korenaga; Masaki Iwamoto
Studio	Xebec
Licensed by	AUS: Madman Entertainment; NA: Bandai Entertainment; UK: MVM Films
Released	December 25, 2000
Runtime	44 minutes
Original video animation
Love Hina Spring Special: I Wish Your Dream
Directed by	Yoshiaki Iwasaki
Produced by	Shinichi Ikeda; Yukinao Shimoji; Fukashi Azuma
Written by	Kurō Hazuki
Music by	Koichi Korenaga; Masaki Iwamoto
Studio	Xebec
Licensed by	AUS: Madman Entertainment; NA: Bandai Entertainment; UK: MVM Films
Released	April 1, 2001
Runtime	45 minutes
Original video animation
Love Hina Again
Directed by	Yoshiaki Iwasaki
Produced by	Atsushi Moriyama; Naoki Hiramatsu
Written by	Kurō Hazuki
Music by	Shinkichi Mitsumune
Studio	Xebec
Licensed by	AUS: Madman Entertainment; NA: Discotek Media; UK: MVM Films
Released	January 26, 2002 – March 27, 2002
Runtime	30 minutes
Episodes	3
- icon

Love Hina (Japanese: ラブ ひな, Hepburn: Rabu Hina) is a Japanese manga series written and illustrated by Ken Akamatsu. It was serialized in Kodansha's Weekly Shōnen Magazine from October 1998 to October 2001, with the chapters collected into 14 tankōbon volumes by Kodansha. The series tells the story of Keitarō Urashima and his attempts to find the girl with whom he made a childhood promise to enter the University of Tokyo. The manga was licensed for an English-language release in North America and the United Kingdom by Tokyopop, in Australia by Madman Entertainment, and in Singapore by Chuang Yi. Two novelizations of Love Hina, written by two anime series screenwriters, were also released in Japan by Kodansha. Both novels were later released in North America and the United Kingdom by Tokyopop.

A twenty-four episode anime adaptation of the manga series, produced by Xebec, aired in Japan from April to September 2000. It was followed by a bonus DVD episode, Christmas and Spring television specials, and a three episode original video animation (OVA) entitled Love Hina Again. The anime series, special, and OVA were licensed for release in North America by Bandai Entertainment. In July 2007, the license was acquired by Funimation, who released a boxset of the television series in February 2009. The series is also licensed in Australia by Madman Entertainment and in the United Kingdom by MVM Films.

The series has proved extremely popular around the world, both commercially and critically. In Japan, the manga had 20 million copies in circulation; over 1 million anime DVDs were also sold. The English release of the manga has been reprinted many times. Both anime and manga have received numerous industry awards in Japan and North America, as well as praise from critics.

== Plot ==
The series takes place in the Kanagawa Prefecture, and centers on Keitarō Urashima and his attempts to fulfill a childhood promise that he made with a girl to enter the University of Tokyo together. However, he has forgotten the name of the girl he made the promise to and hopes to be accepted into the university in order to find her. Having failed the entrance exam twice and with his parents no longer willing to support him, he goes to stay at his grandmother's hotel, only to find out that it has been converted into a female-only apartment (Dormitory). The tenants are about to kick him out when his aunt appears and announces that his grandmother has given him the title to the apartments. Much to their dismay Keitarō becomes the new manager of the family-owned girls' dorm Hinata House and must now balance his new responsibilities in addition to studying for the university entrance exam.

At Hinata House, Keitarō meets Naru Narusegawa, who is also studying to enter the university. Naru ranks first in the whole of Japan on the practice exams, and Keitarō convinces her to help him study. As the two of them grow closer through their studies, and after Keitarō accidentally reads a small section of Naru's diary, he becomes increasingly convinced that Naru may be the girl with whom he made the promise. On the second day of the university exam, Keitarō asks Naru about the promise and is stunned when she tells him he is mistaken. Despite their studying, and Naru's mock exam results, they both fail the exams. The pair then have an argument and independently run off to Kyoto to clear their heads. While on their trip they settle their differences and meet Mutsumi Otohime, who lives in Okinawa and is also studying for the university exams.

After returning from Kyoto, Keitarō and Naru decide to retake the exams. After a while, Mutsumi moves to Tokyo, and the three begin to study together. During this period, Naru becomes convinced that Mutsumi is Keitarō's promised girl, but Mutsumi states that she made a childhood promise with Naru, not Keitarō. During the next round of university exams, Keitarō believes he has failed them once again and runs away before finding out his results. After learning of this, Naru chases after him without checking her exam results either, and they are followed by the rest of the residents of Hinata House who announce that Keitarō and Naru both passed the exams along with Mutsumi. Unfortunately for him, Keitarō has an accident at the University of Tokyo opening ceremony and is unable to attend classes for three months. After recovering from his injuries, Keitarō decides to study overseas with Noriyasu Seta. As Keitarō is about to leave, Naru finally confesses her feelings to him at the airport and decides to wait for him to return.

When Keitarō returns, he and Naru finally begin to express their feelings for each other. After they deal with new obstacles, Grandma Hina returns to Hinata House and reveals Naru is the girl of Keitarō's promise. Three years later, a wedding ceremony (with a new girl, Ema Maeda, presented) is held at Hinata House for Naru and Keitarō as they finally fulfill their childhood promise to each other.

== Production ==
Comparison between early and late designs for the character that became Naru

Initial sketches for the series were created between September and December 1997, after the completion of A.I. Love You. Early storyboards with initial character designs were created between December 1997 and January 1998, and further character designs and location sketches followed between January and April 1998. The last storyboards before serialization were created between April and August 1998.

Around six months before the start of serialization, character designs were still going through several revisions before being settled upon. Several characters underwent complete redesigns and name changes. At one stage the character Naru was named Midori, and she was supposed to fall through a hole in the floor naked, bump her head on Keitaro and lose her memory. Naru's name was changed many times before the author settled on Naru Narusegawa, and her final design is similar to Saati Namba from A.I. Love You. Mitsune "Kitsune" Konno's money-grubbing nature and her older, jaded, and more mature personality were originally intended to be used for Kaolla Su. Shinobu Maehara's nature was settled on from the beginning of the series, however her physical appearance and age were extensively redesigned as the series concept was shaped. In her early design, Shinobu had a similar appearance to Forty Namba from A.I. Love You.

Throughout the run of the manga, the series used digital editing processes. After a rough sketch of a page was created, the page layout and basic detail were drawn and scanned into an Apple Macintosh. The major page elements were then shaded or filled with patterns, and elements that were drawn separately were added digitally to the page. The manga also used a series of "banked images", which were basic line drawings of locations, such as a characters room. Instead of redrawing a location from scratch every time it was used, these banked images could be used as a base, and extra detail added to them depending on the requirements for the scene.

Both of these techniques lead to characters having white outlines when copied digitally onto the scene. Parts of Hinata Inn and other locations used were inspired by real life locations and designed from photographs collected during research.

== Media ==
=== Manga ===
Written and illustrated by Ken Akamatsu, Love Hina was serialized in Kodansha's shōnen manga magazine Weekly Shōnen Magazine, between October 21, 1998, to October 31, 2001. Its chapters were collected in 14 tankōbon volumes, released from March 17, 1999, to January 17, 2002. The series was later released in a partially colored format known as the "Iro Hina version". The 14 Iro Hina volumes were released between July 2001 and April 2004. A new seven-volume edition was released by Kodansha between June and December 2014.

Kodansha published a bilingual English and Japanese edition under the Kodansha Bilingual Comics label. Eight volumes were produced under the bilingual format between October 2000 and July 2001. The edition was removed from sale after the series was licensed by Tokyopop.

The series was licensed for an English-language release in North America and the United Kingdom by Tokyopop, which released the 14 volumes between May 21, 2002, and September 16, 2003. The English release was one of Tokyopop's first releases in the "Authentic Manga" lineup of titles using the Japanese right to left reading style. In doing so the artwork remained unchanged from the original. The series appeared consistently in Tokyopop's top five selling manga and has been reprinted several times. In August 2009, it was revealed that Tokyopop's license had been left to expire by Kodansha and would not be renewed. Kodansha Comics licensed the series with a new translation. This omnibus edition was released as 5 volumes between October 2011 and March 2013.

The series is also licensed for an English-language release in Singapore by Chuang Yi and for regional language releases in France and Québec by Pika Édition, in Spain by Glénat, in Brazil by Editora JBC, in Mexico by Grupo Editorial Vid, in Poland by Waneko, in Greece by Compupress, in Germany in German, in Norway by Schibsted Forlag, in Sweden by Bonnier Carlsen and in Denmark by Egmont Manga & Anime.

The September 1, 2010, issue of Weekly Shōnen Magazine included a six-color-page Love Hina one-shot. A crossover one-shot with Aho Girl was released on August 27, 2014.

=== Anime ===
Love Hina was adapted into a 24-episode anime television series by Xebec, a division of Production I.G. The series aired on TV Tokyo April 19 to September 27, 2000. The opening theme was "Sakura Saku" and the closing theme was "Kimi Sae Ireba". Both songs were written by Ritsuko Okazaki and performed by Megumi Hayashibara. The two themes were released as a CD single, which debuted on the Oricon charts at Number 7. A bonus 25th episode was later created and released as a DVD extra. The series and bonus episode were directed by Yoshiaki Iwasaki, written by Shō Aikawa and featured character designs by Makoto Uno.

In Japan, the television series was released on nine DVDs by Starchild Records between August 3, 2000, and April 2, 2001. Love Hina is credited with being one of the first anime series to be available unofficially as a digitally produced fansub, with multiple groups working on the series. The popularity and widespread availability of the series in this form meant that several potential licensors of the series such as ADV Films had concerns over licensing the series. The series was later licensed in North America by Bandai Entertainment, who released six DVDs between February 19 and November 19, 2002. In July 2007, Funimation Entertainment announced they had acquired the license to the series after Bandai's license had expired. A new boxset of the television series across 4 discs was released by Funimation on February 24, 2009. It was then re-released as part of Funimation's Viridian Collection on July 27, 2010. In the United Kingdom, the series is licensed by MVM Films, who released the series on six DVDs between September 6, 2004, and March 7, 2005, and as a boxset on May 14, 2007. In Australia and New Zealand the series is licensed by Madman Entertainment, who also released the series across six DVDs between September 18, 2002, and February 11, 2003. A box set was released on December 3, 2003.

After the television series was completed, a Christmas special, Love Hina Xmas Eve: Silent Night, was produced and shown on December 25, 2000, on TV Tokyo. A DVD was released in Japan on July 4, 2001. It was then released in North America on December 3, 2002, and in the United Kingdom on November 7, 2005. The Spring Special Love Hina Spring Special: I Wish Your Dream was also shown on TV Tokyo on April 2, 2001. The DVD was released in Japan on August 1, 2001, in North American on March 18, 2003, and in the United Kingdom on May 16, 2005. Finally, an OVA series called Love Hina Again was released on DVD in Japan in 3 parts between January 26 and March 27, 2002. A CD single featuring the opening theme "Kirari Takaramono" and the ending theme "Be for Me, Be for You" was released on February 28, 2002. A solo version was used for the first episode, and a duet with Yūji Ueda was used for the third episode. The North American and United Kingdom releases of Love Hina Again grouped the 3 parts together on one disc and were released on September 2, 2003, and January 7, 2008, respectively.

After the end of the television series, Love Hina Final Selection was released, containing a summary of the series and "Love Live Hina", a live concert featuring all of the main cast members.

The anime was later used as the source for a film comic, Love Hina Anime Comics, which told the anime story in comic form using stills from the show as the comic panels. The anime Comics series follows the story of the television series, unaired 25th episode, and the Xmas and Spring specials and each volume contains 3 exclusive trading cards. The film comics also contain anime production info.

=== Light novels ===
Two novels have been written by the anime screenwriters and illustrated by Ken Akamatsu as side stories of the main series. Love Hina: Mystery Guests at Hinata Hotel was written by Shō Aikawa under the pen name "Kurō Hazuki", was published in Japan by Kodansha on May 17, 2001. It was rereleased in a bilingual edition (English and Japanese) in December 2001. The second novel, Love Hina: Secrets at Hinata Hotel was written by Hiroyuki Kawasaki and released in Japan on February 15, 2002, with a bilingual edition released the same month. Tokyopop licensed both novels for an English-language distribution in North America, releasing the first novel under the title Love Hina: The Novel, Volume 1 on April 11, 2006, and the second novel under the title Love Hina: The Novel, Volume 2 on August 8, 2006.

=== Reference books ===
Two reference books for the manga series have been released for fans of the series. Love Hina 0 was released on July 17, 2002, and contains character profiles, interviews and production info as well as other supporting materials for the first seven volumes of the manga. Love Hina Mugendai (ラブひな∞) was released on July 17, 2002, and contains character profiles, a timeline, artwork, interviews and production info. A large section is dedicated to early production sketches and handwritten development notes.

Two reference books have also been released for the anime series. Ani-Hina Ver.1 was released on August 4, 2000, and Ani-Hina Ver.2 was released on November 9, 2000. Each book contains character profiles, episode summaries, production sketches and details as well as interviews and information on the voice actors; each covers half of the anime series.

=== Video games ===
The series has seen several video games released across several platforms. The Game Boy Color received Love Hina Pocket on August 4, 2000, and Love Hina Party on January 26, 2001. The Game Boy Advance received Love Hina Advance on September 7, 2001. The Sega Dreamcast received Love Hina: Totsuzen no Engeji Happening on September 28, 2000, and Love Hina: Smile Again on March 29, 2001. The Sony PlayStation received Love Hina 1: Ai wa Kotoba no Naka ni on September 28, 2000, and Love Hina 2: Kotoba wa Konayuki no Yō ni on November 30, 2000. The Sony PlayStation 2 received Love Hina: Gojasu Chiratto Happening on May 22, 2003.

=== Soundtracks ===
Prior to the start of the anime, several image songs were recorded by the anime cast members. Several maxi singles were released featuring some of these image songs as well as drama tracks, also performed by the anime cast. "I Love Hina" was released on April 26, 2000, and followed by Love Hina 1 on June 26, 2000, Love Hina 2 on July 26, 2000, and Love Hina 3 on August 23, 2000. Love Hina 1 came with a box to hold the other singles.

There have been several Love Hina soundtracks released. Love Hina Original Sound File was released on September 21, 2000, and contains all of the background music for the series as well as many vocal songs. Love Hina — Winter Special Soundtrack was released on January 24, 2001, and was followed by Love Hina — Spring Special Soundtrack on June 6, 2001. Love Hina Again Soundtrack was released on April 3, 2002. Two collections of vocal songs featuring the female cast members were released: Love Hina – Hinata Girls Song Best was released on March 16, 2001, and Love Hina – Hinata Girls Song Best 2 was released on October 3, 2001. Many of the songs featured on these two albums were written by Ritsuko Okazaki, who released the self cover album Love Hina Okazaki Collection on December 16, 2001. Two live concerts called Love Live Hina were performed by the Japanese cast members. The Tokyo Bay performance was bundled on DVD with Love Hina Final Selection, and the Osaka Performance was available separately.

== Reception ==
The first 11 volumes sold over 6 million copies in Japan by October 2001. By 2022, the manga had over 20 million copies in circulation. Love Hina won the Kodansha Manga Award for best shōnen title in 2001. It was selected as the "Best Manga, USA Release" at both the 2002 and 2004 Anime Expo conventions. In 2003, the title was among the top ten graphic novels on Nielsen BookScan's list and one of the first graphic novels to ever appear in the general trade paperback list. The popular culture|pop culture website ICv2 voted Love Hina "Anime Product of the Year" in 2002.

The series was well received by critics. Tony Chen, of Anime News Network (ANN), found it to be a funny series, though finding the 16+ rating appropriate due to the number of jokes involving sexual innuendo. He praised the beautiful artwork, feeling the "sexy and cute" female designs were perfect for the series and that Keitarō's design fit his dorky personality. Chen found Naru's regularly catching Keitarō making a mistake and calling him a pervert redundant and annoying. Eric Luce of Ex.org notes an increased character development over other love comedies, and describes the series as "nothing if not whimsical".

In Japan, the television series DVDs sold over 1 million copies. The release of the second and third DVDs in Japan was only the second time that an anime series had consecutive number 1 chart positions. This would not occur again until over 15 years later with Mr. Osomatsu.

ANN's Bamboo Dong praised the anime adaptation for being very intriguing and mixing "drama, romance, and slapstick comedy in a pleasing combination". She found the music "incredibly cute" and felt it was used in a way which contributed to many of the dramatic effects in the anime. In The Anime Encyclopedia: A Guide to Japanese Animation Since 1917, Jonathan Clements and Helen McCarthy felt the female characters were a "standard rack of female anime archetypes" and that the series as a whole was a "culmination of a decade of geek-centered anime". Kenneth Lee, writing for Ex.org, praised the look and quality of the animation, highlighting the benefits of the digital creation of the adaption over traditional cel animation. Lee recognised elements from other series such as Maison Ikkoku and Kimagure Orange Road, and summarised the series as "simply wonderful". Chris Beveridge, of AnimeOnDVD.com, noted the first anime DVD volume was "really well put together", but also felt the manga did not translate into an anime series particularly well. He praised the Christmas special, noting that it was "several notches above the TV series" but found that while the Spring Special had amusing moments, it was rushed with bad plotting.

The Love Hina Again OVA received more mixed reviews, with ANN's Zac Bertschy feeling it reversed part of the plot of the main anime series and never reached the same entertainment level as the television series. The character of Kanako, Keitarō's sister, was heavily criticized for being "one of the most annoying characters ever created even though she would have been better for Keitaro than Naru." Beveridge praised the fun and comedy as well as the fan service, but also noted that one's enjoyment would depend on whether they still cared for the characters.
