= List of A.I. Love You chapters =

Japanese manga series chapters

A.I. Love You (A・I が止まらない!, A.I. ga Tomaranai!) is a Japanese manga series by author Ken Akamatsu. The story follows Hitoshi Kōbe, a high school guy whose only skill is programming. He creates a program in particular named Program 30 which is that of a female, and is shocked when she comes to life in the real world due to a lightning storm. Hitoshi names her Saati and teaches her about the real world, while she instructs him on how to properly have a girlfriend. Things get more complex however when two more of Hitoshi's programs come to life, and a hacker goes after Saati's program. A.I. Love You was first serialized through Weekly Shōnen Magazine in 1994, but later moved to Magazine Special where it ended in 1997. The series was collected into nine manga volumes that were also released by Kodansha between 1994 and 1997. Two re-releases followed; however, each time a volume was deducted.

In 2003, Tokyopop acquired the license to release the series in North America. The story's title was changed but Tokyopop tried to keep a pun that had been used in the original Japanese title. Eight English language manga volumes were released between February 3, 2004, and April 12, 2005. The volumes were printed until 2009 when Tokyopop announced that the series would go out of print. The English adaptation was well received, and although reviewers pointed out that Akamatsu's artwork was not at the professional level yet, they praised the story and characters.

== Volume list ==
No.	Original release date	Original ISBN	English release date	English ISBN
01	September 16, 1994	4-06-312056-2	February 3, 2004	1591826152
Program 1: The Program Goes Haywire Program 2: Wake Up at Hotel Ryūgūjō Program 3: Join the Club! Program 4: Take Me to the Ocean! Program 5: The Laughing Invader Program 6: SAYONARA Program 7: Money Trouble?!
02	November 17, 1994	4-06-312073-2	April 13, 2004	1591826160
Program 8: Happy (or Unhappy) Birthday Program 9: The Good Life Program 10: The Lady Who Causes Storms Program 11: She's a Real Hottie! Program 12: The Poolside Kiss Program 13: Love Triangle Program 14: Saati vs. Toeni Program 15: Mountain Happening Program 16: A Wish Upon a Star
03	March 16, 1995	4-06-312119-4	June 8, 2004	1591826179
Program 17: Saati's Crisis Program 18: Death Trap Program 19: Aiming for A.I. Program 20: A.I. Memory... Please Come Back! Program 21: Beware of Sudden Data Collection Program 22: A Day with Puppy Program 23: On a Holy Night Program 24: A Snowy Night in the Mountains
04	July 17, 1995	4-06-312161-5	August 3, 2004	1591826187
Program 25: Please, Touch Me! Program 26: The Third Man?! Program 27: The Gloomy Experience Program 28: Boy's Day or Girl's Day Program 29: Her First Errand Program 30: Love Makes You Think Too Much Program 31: Child's Play
05	March 16, 1996	4-06-312249-2	October 5, 2004	1591826195
Special Program The Inevitable Ocean Route to Hawaii! Program 32: From Cheers to Heartbreak? Program 33: Hurting Her Little Heart Program 34: Please, Tell Mee You Love Me! Program 35: Class is in Session!! Program 36: It's Been a While... I Miss You Program 37: Unforgivable Things
06	July 17, 1996	4-06-312296-4	December 7, 2004	1591826209
Volume 6 Program 38: The Call of the Wild Program 39: If We Meet in a Dream (part 1) Program 40: If We Meet in a Dream (part 2) Special Program Four Lbs Short!! Program 41: How to Become a World Martial Arts Champion!! Program 42: My Fair Lady Program 43: From Cindy
07	February 17, 1997	4-06-312379-0	February 8, 2005	1591829437
Program 44: Who Wants to be a Beach Queen? Program 45: The Wheel of Temptation Program 46: The Last Scene is MINE! (part 1) Program 47: The Last Scene is MINE! (part 2) Program 48: The Last Scene is MINE! (part 3)
08	May 16, 1997	4-06-312415-0	April 12, 2005	1591829445
Program 49: I Love Toeni! Program 50: Forty's Feelings Program 51: The Girl with the Inferiority Complex (part 1) Program 52: The Girl with the Inferiority Complex (part 2) Program 53: Reality Transformation Panic Program 54: Take Heart Program 55: Don't Say Goodbye
09	October 17, 1997	4-06-312470-3	—	—
