= Hito Natsu no Kids Game =

Japanese manga

ひと夏のKIDSゲーム (Hito Natsu no KIDS Gēmu)
- Genre: Romance
- Manga
- Written by: Ken Akamatsu
- Published by: Kodansha
- Magazine: Magazine Fresh
- Published: September 10, 1993

Hito Natsu no Kids Game (Japanese: ひと夏のKIDSゲーム, Hepburn: Hito Natsu no KIDS Gēmu; lit. 'One Summer's Kids' Game') is a Japanese manga written and illustrated by Ken Akamatsu; it is his debut work. The manga was published in the September issue of Kodansha's Magazine Fresh on September 10, 1993. Ken Akamatsu later received Kodansha's "Freshman Manga Award" (新人漫画賞/少年マガジン新人賞) and Special Jury Award (審査員特別賞) for this work. The manga was re-published on May 20, 2001.

== Plot summary ==
The narrative revolves around a high school student named Shinya Matsumoto and his love story, which takes place in the summer vacation. Shinya unexpectedly encounters a car accident, which results in a mother and son being taken to a hospital. The son, Daisuke Kirishima, is completely fine while his mother, Reiko Kirishima must stay in the hospital for three weeks and is unable to look after her son thereafter. Reiko's younger sister, Yuki Kirishima, visits the hospital but she turns out to be Shinya's classmate and love interest. Yuki, who needs to care for Daisuke Kirishima, faces problematic situation as there is no place for Daisuke to settle down. Shinya suggests that he will provide room for Daisuke to live and Yuki visits his house on regular basis to care for them. Shinya then starts a romantic relationship with Yuki.

== Main characters ==
Shinya Matsumoto (松本 しんや, Matsumoto Shinya)
The male protagonist. He is a high school student who originally lives alone. He undertakes the task of caring for Yuki Kirishima's nephew Daisuke after the car accident. During the summer period he develops a relationship with Yuki.
Yuki Kirishima (桐島 友紀, Kirishima Yuki)
The female protagonist. Yuki is Shinya's classmate. She visits Shinya's house regularly to look after Shinya and her nephew. She is good at cooking.
Reiko Kirishima (桐島 礼子, Kirishima Reiko)
Yuki's older sister. She left home in her early years and later gave birth to Daisuke. She has to stay in hospital after she get injured in a car accident and since then her son is temporarily looked after by the two leads.
Daisuke Kirishima (桐島 大祐, Kirishima Daisuke)
Reiko's son and Yuki's nephew, a three-year-old boy who loves painting. He lives in Shinya's house when his mother is in hospital.
Shinsaku Kirishima (桐島 晋作, Kirishima Shinsaku)
The father of Reiko and Yuki. In the story he is a member of the House of Representatives.
Akira (明, Akira)
Daisuke's father. He died one year after Daisuke was born. He shares some common characteristics with Shinya.

== Name ==
The manga title literally means "one summer's kids' game". The original title is Natsuyasumi Dake no Pearentsu (夏休みだけのペアレンツ), which means "summer vacation only parents". But the original title was eventually rejected for being criticized by the editors.

== Awards ==
The manga won the 50th Freshman Manga Award and Special Jury Award (1993)

== Significance ==
This is Akamatsu's first manga work to be published by a mainstream manga magazine and Akamatsu received the Shōnen Magazine Freshman Award for this work. It not only encouraged Akamatsu to become a manga artist, but also drew attentions from manga editors. Akamatsu was inspired by the plans of manga editors and this led to the creation of his later work A.I. Love You.
