= Higashikurume =

Higashikurume 東久留米市
- City
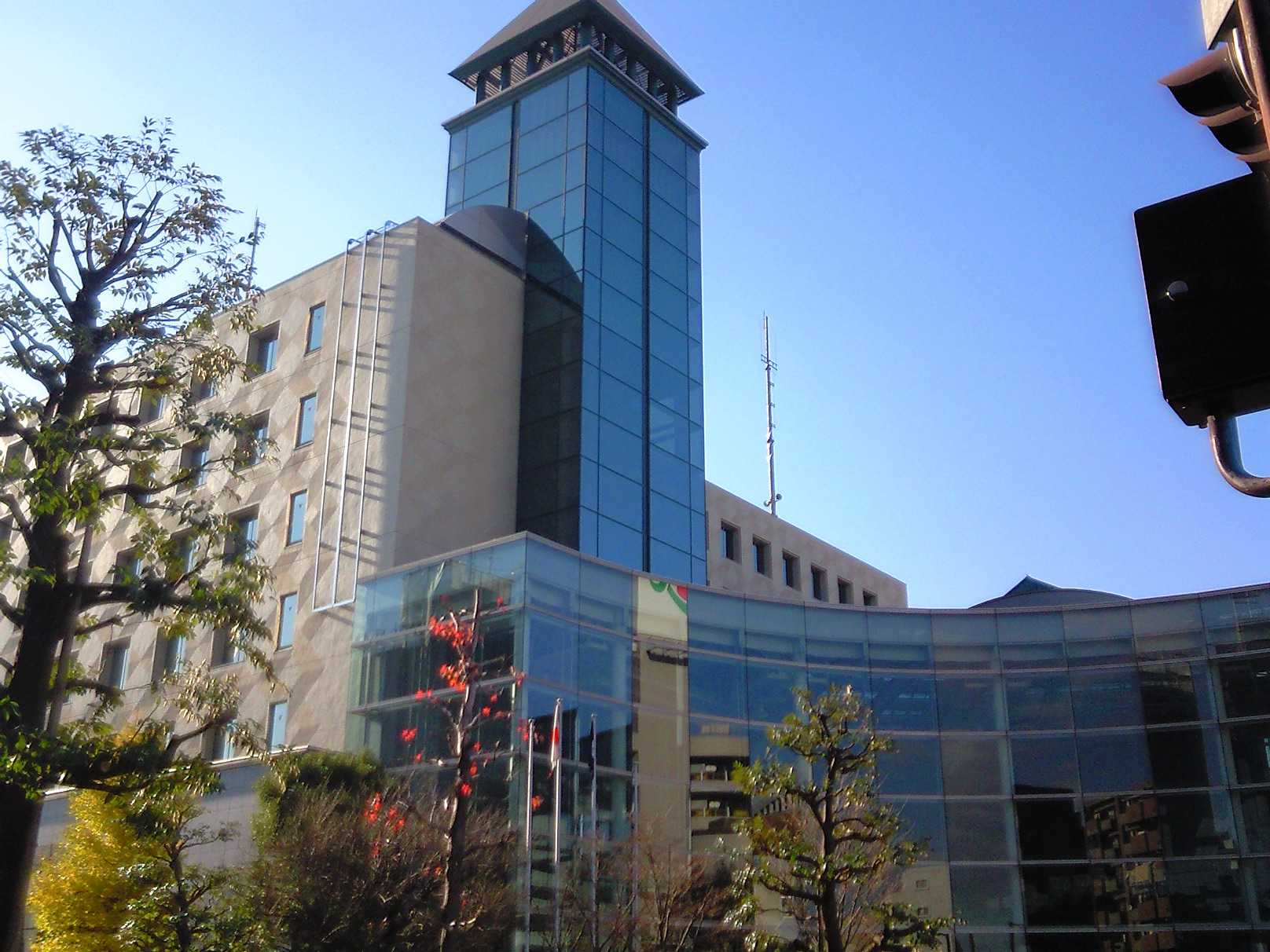
- Higashikurume City Hall

- Flag Seal

- Location of Higashikurume in Tokyo Metropolis

- Location within Japan
- Coordinates: 35°45′28.8″N 139°31′47.5″E
- Country: Japan
- Region: Kantō
- Prefecture: Tokyo

Government
  - Mayor: Ryōma Tomita

Area
  - Total: 12.88 km^{2} (4.97 sq mi)

Population (April 2021)
  - Total: 117,020
  - Density: 9,085/km^{2} (23,530/sq mi)
- Time zone: UTC+9 (Japan Standard Time)
  - Tree: Ginkgo
  - Flower: Azalea
  - Bird: Azure-winged magpie
- Phone number: 042-470-7777
- Address: 3-3-1 Hon-cho, Higashikurume-shi, Tokyo 203-8555
- Website: Official website

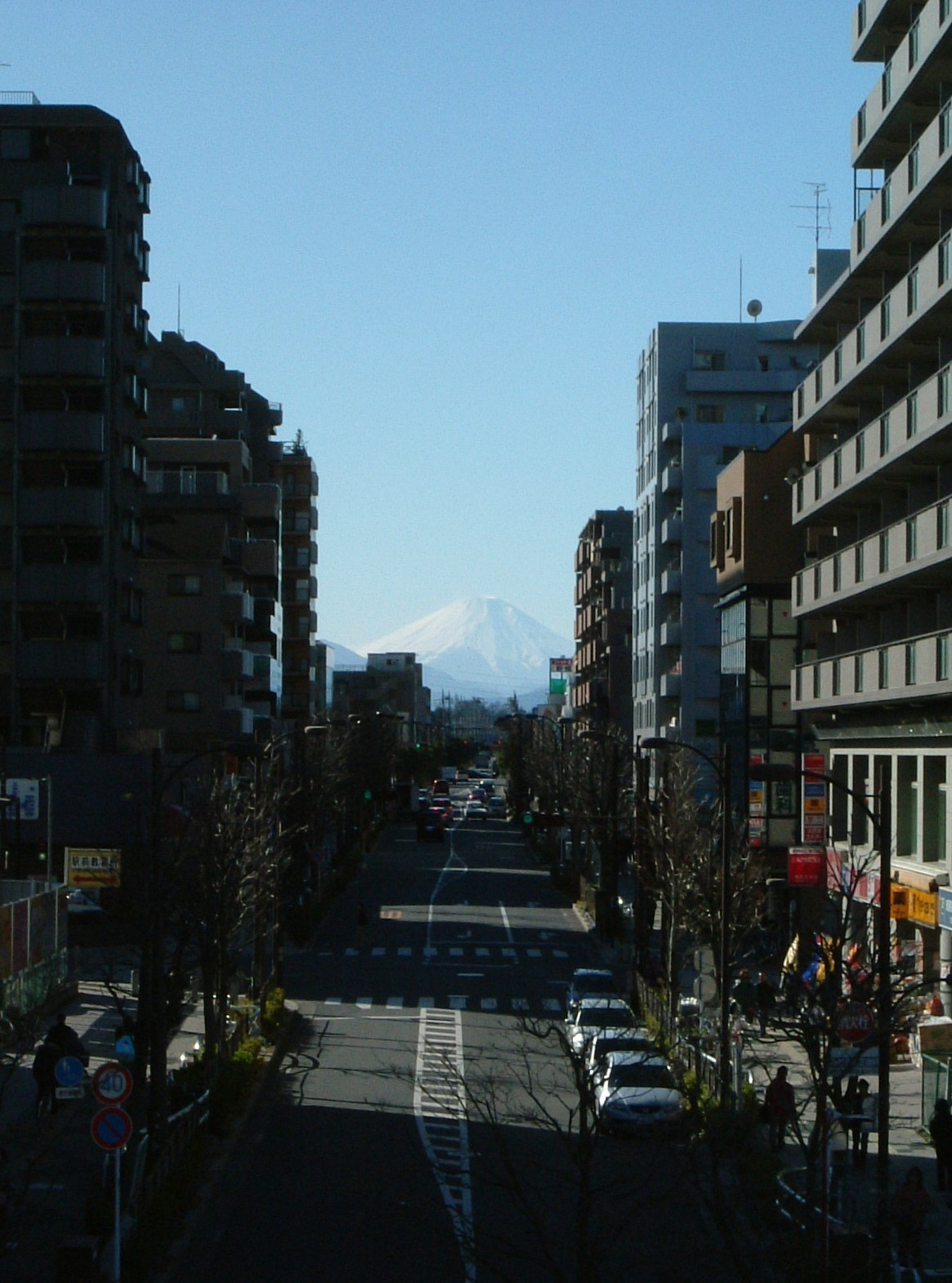
Mt Fuji from downtown Higashikurume

Higashikurume (東久留米市, Higashi-kurume-shi) is a city located in the western portion of the Tokyo Metropolis, Japan. As of 1 April 2021, the city had an estimated population of 117,020, and a population density of 9100 persons per km^{2}. The total area of the city was 12.88 square kilometres (4.97 sq mi).

== Geography ==
Higashikurume is in the north-center of Tokyo Metropolis, on the Musashino Terrace, approximately 25 kilometers from downtown Tokyo. The Kurome River flows through the western end of the city, and the Ochiai River flows through the center of the city. The land slopes gently from west to east.

=== Surrounding municipalities ===
Saitama Prefecture

- Niiza

Tokyo Metropolis

- Higashimurayama
- Kiyose
- Kodaira
- Nishitokyo

=== Climate ===
Higashikurume has a humid subtropical climate (Köppen Cfa) characterized by warm summers and cool winters with light to no snowfall. The average annual temperature in Higashikurume is 14.0 °C. The average annual rainfall is 1647 mm with September as the wettest month. The temperatures are highest on average in August, at around 25.7 °C, and lowest in January, at around 2.3 °C.

== Demographics ==
Per Japanese census data, the population of Higashikurume increased rapidly in the 1960s and 1970s due to the establishment of many large scale public housing complexes, but has remained relatively constant over the past 40 years. As with Japan as a whole, the city's population has aged rapidly in recent decades.

Historical population
Year	Pop.	±%
1920	4,605	—
1930	5,153	+11.9%
1940	6,168	+19.7%
1950	8,415	+36.4%
1960	19,637	+133.4%
1970	78,075	+297.6%
1980	106,556	+36.5%
1990	113,818	+6.8%
2000	113,302	−0.5%
2010	116,546	+2.9%
2020	115,271	−1.1%

== History ==
The area of present-day Higashikurume was part of ancient Musashi Province. In the post-Meiji Restoration cadastral reform of April 1, 1889, Kurume Village were established within Kitatama District of Kanagawa Prefecture. The entire district was transferred to the control of Tokyo Prefecture on April 1, 1893. The area began development after connection to central Tokyo was established by the Musashino Railway from 1915. In 1956, the village of Kurume attained town status. In the 1960s and 1970s, the population rapidly expanded with the construction of large public housing estates. The city was founded on October 1, 1970.

=== Etymology of the city name ===
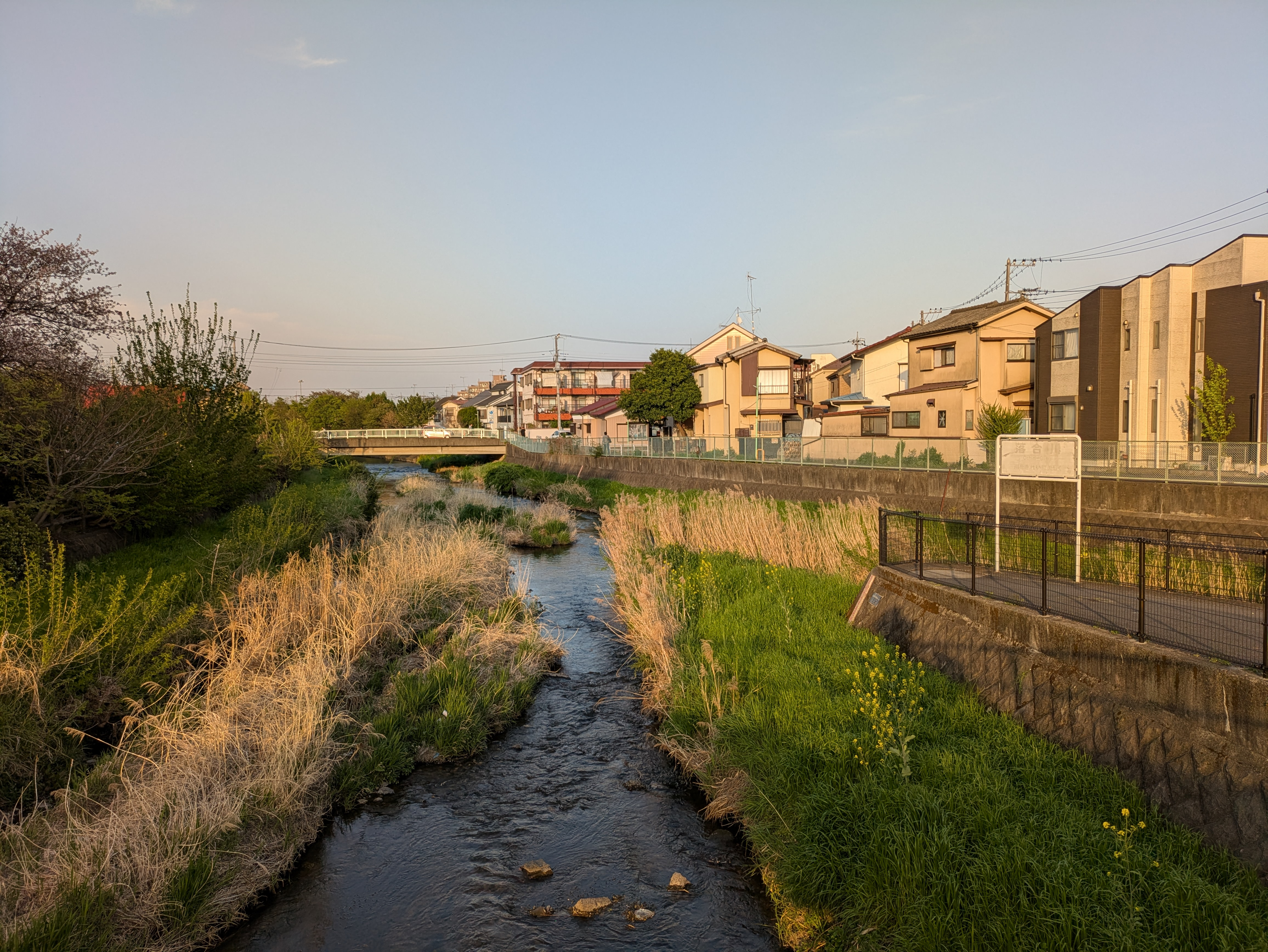
The confluence of the Kurome River and the Ochiai River

The origin of the name Kurume is unclear, but there are several theories:

- as a variante of the ancient "kuruma muchibe", maintenance staff of the emperor's litter
- a dialect form of the Japanese word for "walnut"
- a word meaning "small, flat place"
- The theory that the "Kurome" of the Kuromegawa River：黒目川 flowing through the city turns into the place name of "Kurume". Originally, the Kurome River was also called "Kurume" River, the later people used the kanji notation such as Kurume=久留米or久留目or来梅・Kurome=黒目etc. . This was later recognised as the most likely theory.

At the time of the founding of the city, the name was changed to Higashikurume in order to avoid being confused for Kurume, Fukuoka. Since the new name already had already existed since 1915 as the name of the local train station, the name was already familiar to residents and adopted quickly.

== Government ==
Higashikurume has a mayor-council form of government with a directly elected mayor and a unicameral city council of 22 members. Higashikurume, collectively with the city of Kiyose, contributes two members to the Tokyo Metropolitan Assembly. In terms of national politics, the city is part of Tokyo 20th district of the lower house of the Diet of Japan.

The mayor is Ryōma Tomita, an independent candidate.

=== City council ===
The current city council was elected on April 23, 2023, with 21 council seats currently occupied.

Political party	Number of representatives
Liberal Democratic Party	5
Komeito	5
Japanese Communist Party	3
Citizen Autonomy Forum	2
Constitutional Democratic Party	1
Japan Innovation Party	1
Democratic Party For the People	1
Tomin First no Kai	1
Others	2

=== List of mayors ===
- Kenko Fujii (1970 - 1975)
- Seiju Ishidzuka (1975 - 1978)
- Kojiro Ito (1978 - 1982)
- Saburo Yoshida (1982 - 1990)
- Michio Inaba (1990 - 2001)
- Shigeya Nozaki (2002 - 2010)
- Kazuhiko Baba (2010 - 2014)
- Katsumi Namiki (2014 - 2021)
- Ryōma Tomita (2021 - )

== Economy ==
Higashikurume is primary a regional commercial center, and a bedroom community for central Tokyo. According to the 2010 census, the commuting rate to the special wards of Tokyo is 33.2%. Globeride has its headquarters and a factory in the city. Factories of Coca-Cola and Yamazaki Baking are also located in the city. A few attractions exist, such as Chukurin Park.

== Education ==
Higashikurume is the site for Tokyo Gakugei University's International Student Dormitory.

The city has two metropolitan high schools operated by the Tokyo Metropolitan Board of Education:

- Higashikurume Sogo High School
- Kurume Nishi High School

Higashikurume has 13 public elementary school, and seven public junior high schools operated by the city government.

Municipal junior high schools:

- Chuo (中央中学校)
- Daimon (大門中学校)
- Higashi (東中学校)
- Kurume (久留米中学校)
- Minami (南中学校)
- Nishi (西中学校)
- Shimosato (下里中学校)

Municipal elementary schools:

- No. 1 (第一小学校)
- No. 2 (第二小学校)
- No. 3 (第三小学校)
- No. 5 (第五小学校)
- No. 6 (第六小学校)
- No. 7 (第七小学校)
- No. 9 (第九小学校)
- Hommura (本村小学校)
- Koyama (小山小学校)
- Minamimachi (南町小学校)
- Shinho (神宝小学校)

It is the location of two private schools: Christian Academy in Japan (K-12) and Jiyu Gakuen (coeducational elementary and separate gender junior and senior high schools).

== Transportation ==
=== Railway ===
- Seibu Railway, Seibu Ikebukuro Line

- Higashi-Kurume

=== Highway ===
- Higashikurume is not served by any national highways or expressways

== Notable people from Higashikurume ==
- Ken Akamatsu, manga artist (A.I. Love You, Love Hina, Negima! Magister Negi Magi and UQ Holder!)
- Akihiro Gono, mixed martial arts fighter
- Taichi Kokubun, musician, keyboardist and actor (Tokio)
- Maria Ozawa, Movie actress, model and former AV idol
- Nobunaga Sato, basketball coach
- Hekiru Shiina, Japanese voice actress and singer
- SoulJa (rapper), musician (Real Name: Johannes Maria Leenders Zwaan)
- Papaya Suzuki, musician (Real Name: Hiroshi Suzuki, Nihongo: 鈴木 寛, Suzuki Hiroshi)
- Hinano Yoshikawa, fashion model, actress and singer (Real Name: Ai Takada, Nihongo: 高田愛, Takada Ai)
