= J-Comi =

Japanese ebook website

Manga Library Z
- Owners: J-Comic Terrace Corporation (Ken Akamatsu)
- Website: www.mangaz.com
- Registration: Free/subscription
- Launched: November 26, 2010 (beta), April 12, 2011
- Current status: Online

Manga Library Z (マンガ図書館Z, Manga Toshokan Z), before 2018 known as J-Comi (Jコミ, J Komi), is a Japanese website that distributes out of print manga and doujinshi as DRM-free ebooks, with the permission of the authors and supported by advertising. J-Comi is limited to out of print titles so that quality of the work is assured and so that J-Comi does not compete with publishers. The site was the idea of famed manga artist Ken Akamatsu, officially established on January 25, 2008. But it was not launched until April 12, 2011, after it gained momentum in response to Tokyo Metropolitan Ordinance Regarding the Healthy Development of Youths' 2011 passing of Bill 156, which many manga creators opposed.

== Beta test ==
The first beta test began on November 26, 2010, and included all 14 volumes of CEO Ken Akamatsu's Love Hina. Over the first two days of the beta, there were more than 1 million downloads. Publishers Kodansha and Shueisha are collaborating with J-Comi, and Shueisha provided some additional manga titles for a second beta test.

One of the titles in the beta test, Mayu Shinjo's "After School Wedding", earned 525,000 yen over a month.

== Amnesty program ==
J-Comi created an amnesty program for unauthorised scans of out of print manga, the "Illegal Out-of-Print Manga File Purification Project," whereby users of J-Comi would upload them anonymously to J-Comi, J-Comi would seek permission from the author to publish them, add advertising to the manga and publish them, giving the author the revenues.

== Other developments ==
Currently in Japanese only, J-Comi worked with Google on a comic viewer which could be expanded to American consumers.

Readers can add commentary or translations to J-Comi titles. As of September 2011, J-Comi hosted 103 works. In October 2011, J-Comi added a pay service for erotic manga, including a title which was banned under the revised Tokyo Metropolitan Ordinance Regarding the Healthy Development of Youths.
