= Ken Akamatsu =

Japanese manga artist and politician (born 1968)

- 赤松 健
- Official portrait, 2026

Member of the House of Councillors
- Incumbent
- Assumed office July 26, 2022
- Constituency: National PR

Personal details
- Born: July 5, 1968 (age 58) Nagoya, Aichi, Japan
- Party: Liberal Democratic
- Spouse: Kanon Akamatsu
- Children: 2
- Education: Chuo University
- Occupation: Manga artist, politician
- Known for: Love Hina, Negima! Magister Negi Magi, UQ Holder!
- Awards: Shōnen Magazine Newcomer Award (1993); Kodansha Manga Award (2001)
- Years active: 1993–present
- Website: kenakamatsu.jp

Ken Akamatsu (Japanese: 赤松 健, Hepburn: Akamatsu Ken; born July 5, 1968) is a Japanese manga artist and politician who has served since 2022 as a member of the House of Councillors. He made his professional manga debut in 1993, and is best known as the author of Love Hina (1998–2001) and Negima! Magister Negi Magi (2003–2012), both serialized in Weekly Shōnen Magazine; a sequel to Negima!, UQ Holder!, was serialized from 2013 to 2022. In 2011, Akamatsu founded J-Comi (now Manga Library Z), a free digital distributor of out-of-print manga.

Akamatsu has been a managing director of the Japan Cartoonists Association since 2018, and is a vocal advocate for protecting freedom of expression in manga and anime from expansions in censorship and copyright law. In the 2022 Japanese House of Councillors election, he won a seat as a candidate for the Liberal Democratic Party in the national proportional representation block on a free expression platform, becoming the first manga creator in the National Diet. On November 13, 2024, he was appointed Parliamentary Vice-Minister for Education, Culture, Sports, Science and Technology and Parliamentary Vice-Minister for Reconstruction as part of the Second Ishiba Cabinet. On September 18, 2026, he was appointed Parliamentary Vice-Minister of Digital Agency and Parliamentary Vice-Minister of Cabinet Office as part of the September 2026 cabinet reshuffle of the Second Takaichi Cabinet.

== Early life ==
Ken Akamatsu was born in Nagoya, Aichi Prefecture, on July 5, 1968. His father, a bureaucrat in the Ministry of Agriculture, Forestry and Fisheries, was often transferred, and the family lived in Yamagata, the Kita ward of Tokyo, Kumamoto, Higashikurume, and Kawasaki. Akamatsu attended private Kaijō High School in Shinjuku, Tokyo, and entered Chuo University's Department of Japanese Literature. He has cited Sailor Moon as his introduction to anime and manga. While in college, he was active as a doujinshi creator and sold works at Comiket under the pen name Awa Mizuno (水野 亜和, Mizuno Awa).

== Professional manga ==
In 1993, Akamatsu won the 50th Shōnen Magazine Newcomer Award for his debut work Hito Natsu no Kids Game, published in Kodansha's Magazine Fresh. The following year, he began serializing A.I. Love You (1994–1997) in the publisher's Weekly Shōnen Magazine. Love Hina, published in the magazine from 1998 to 2001, established his popularity, and in 2001 earned him the 25th Kodansha Manga Award (in the shōnen category). His next work, Negima! Magister Negi Magi, was serialized from 2003 to 2012, also in Weekly Shōnen Magazine. Akamatsu's latest manga serial is UQ Holder!, a sequel to Negima! which debuted in the magazine in 2013; it was later transferred to Bessatsu Shōnen Magazine and concluded in 2022. The volumes of UQ Holder! became the first to carry a "Doujin Mark" indicating explicit author permission for use as a source for fan-made works, the result of a publishing initiative led by Akamatsu.

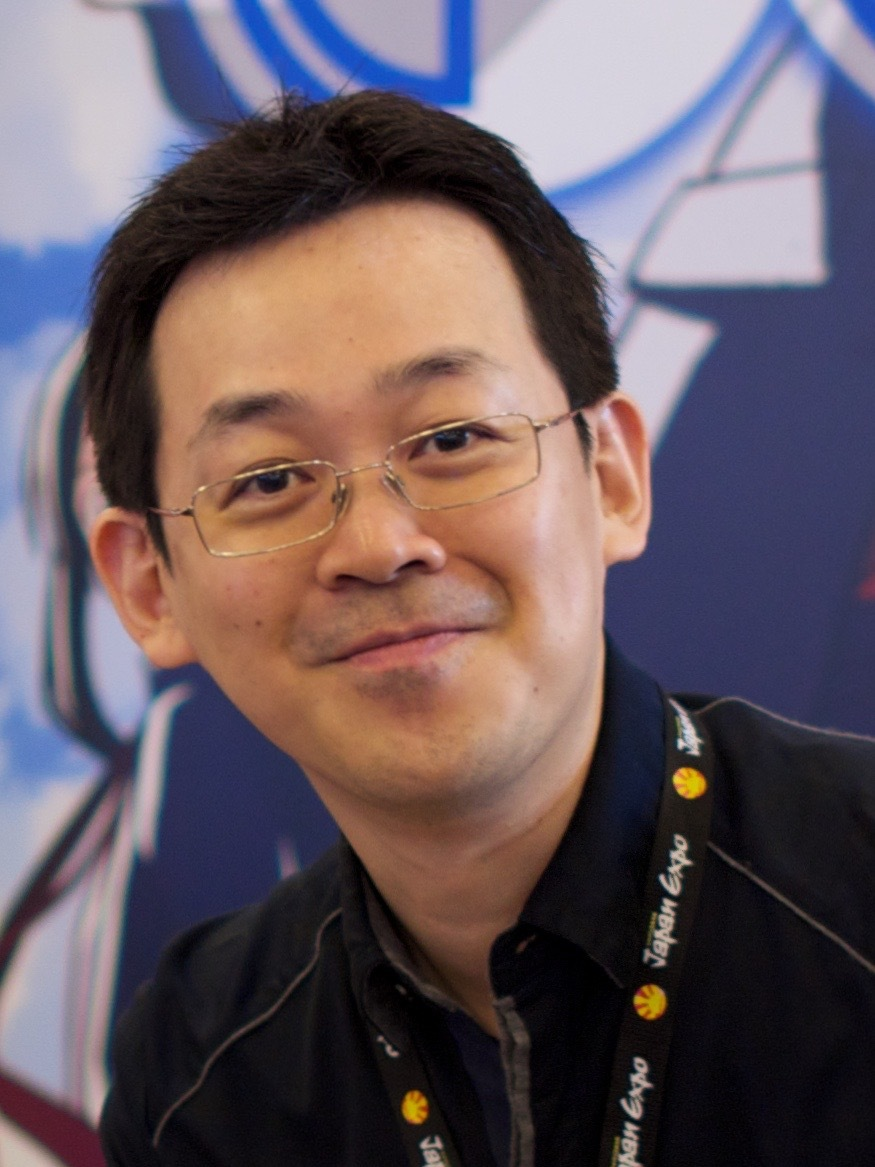
Akamatsu at the Japan Expo in 2015

In 2010, Akamatsu launched a beta test of J-Comi (now Manga Library Z), a free manga download site for out-of-print titles. As the first release, he posted all 14 volumes of Love Hina with six pages of advertising and no digital rights management (DRM) for one month. Manga publishers Kodansha and Shueisha began collaborating with the site after the test, and the site formally launched in 2011. The site gained notoriety later that year when it posted Seiji Matsuyama's Oku-sama wa Shōgakusei ("My Wife Is an Elementary Student") manga, which Tokyo Vice Governor Naoki Inose had cited as an example of a work that should be restricted for physical sale under Tokyo's recently revised Healthy Development of Youths Ordinance.

As of 2022, Akamatsu's manga have a cumulative circulation of over 50 million worldwide. His Love Hina, Negima! Magister Negi Magi, and UQ Holder! have been adapted as anime series; Negima! has also been adapted as a live-action television series.

== Advocacy and politics ==
Akamatsu is a vocal advocate for protection of freedom of expression in anime and manga, and has been an opponent of government attempts to expand censorship and copyright law.

In 2011, he warned that proposed changes to copyright law under the proposed Trans-Pacific Partnership (TPP) would "destroy" Japan's derivative doujin scene; he continued to voice his concerns in following years. In 2013, as spokesman of the Japan Cartoonists Association (JCA), he joined other creators in opposing the Liberal Democratic Party (LDP) and its partners' proposed amendment to Japan's child pornography laws, the draft version of which included wholly-fictional depictions such as lolicon manga in its definitions. Akamatsu visited the National Diet and the LDP headquarters to express his concern, and the final bill passed in 2014 without a ban on explicit anime and manga. He was appointed a managing director of the JCA in 2018. In 2019, Akamatsu and the JCA expressed concern on a government subcommittee's plan to expand copyright law, under which downloading or taking screenshots of anime images and illustrations illegally posted to blogs and Twitter would have been made illegal, as would copying and pasting song lyrics. In 2020, Akamatsu was invited to advise legislators in the Diet on the future of manga, stating that "[c]ompared to other countries, Japan's forte is its freedom of creativity" and that "a situation where Japanese works are regulated by foreign standards" should be avoided.

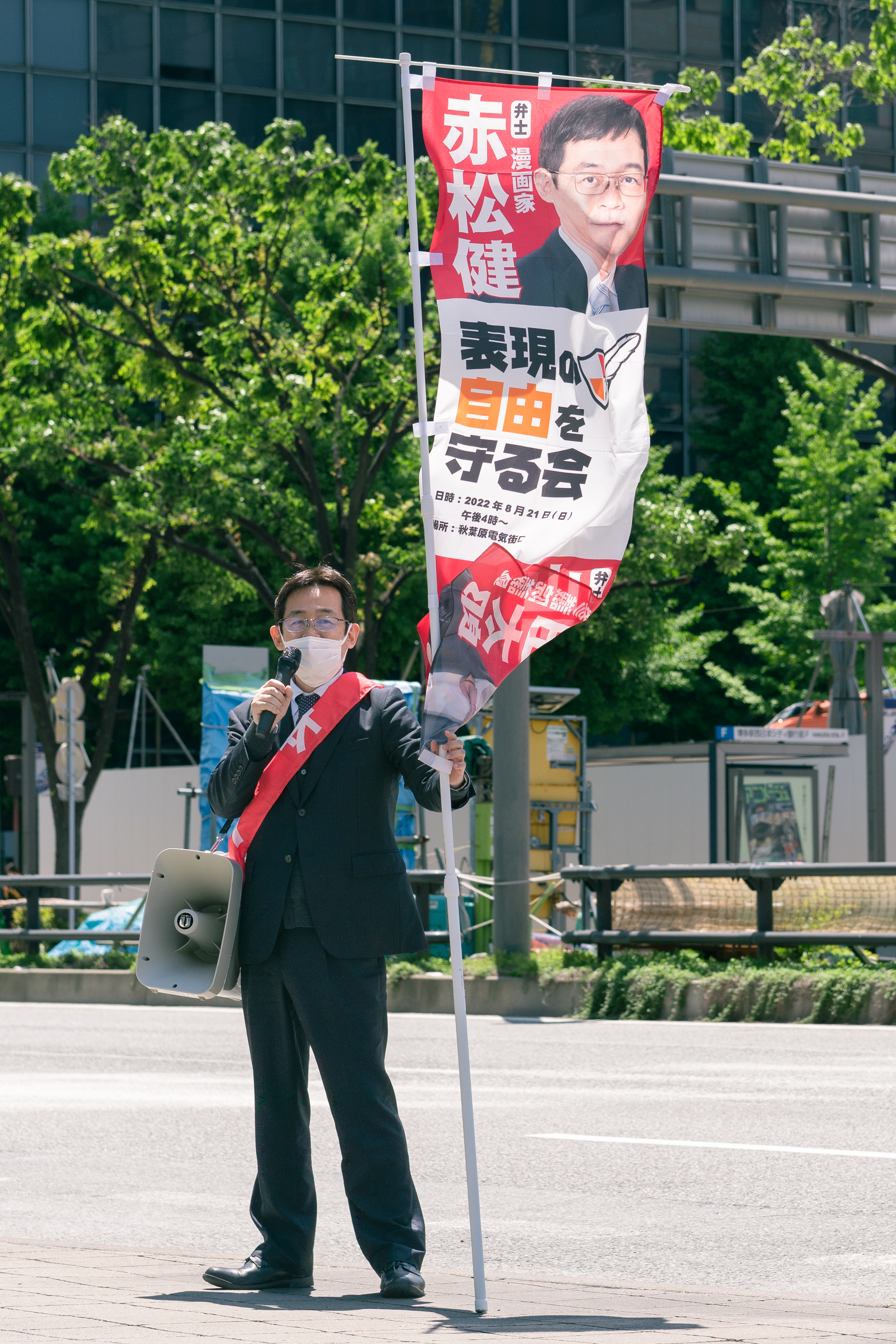
Akamatsu campaigning in Fukuoka in 2022

In December 2021, Akamatsu announced a candidacy in the 2022 election for the national proportional representation block of the House of Councillors, the upper house of the Diet, under the LDP banner. He stated that his major goal was to protect creative freedom of expression, and during the election campaign criticized "external pressure" (both foreign and domestic) to regulate Japan's "freedom of expression, especially for manga, anime, and games", elaborating that such regulations need to be "approached with rationality". On July 10, 2022, Akamatsu won a seat after campaigning in person in all 47 prefectures, becoming the first manga creator in the National Diet. An early initiative of his was a task force on a proposed legal framework for preservation of past and present Japanese video games in a playable state. Since his election, Akamatsu has been pursuing "manga diplomacy", and he argued that capitalizing on intellectual property would strongly benefit Japan.

== Personal life ==
Akamatsu is married to Kanon Akamatsu, a professional cosplayer and former idol; they have two daughters.

== Works ==
=== Manga ===
- Hito Natsu no Kids Game (ひと夏のKIDSゲーム) (1993; one-shot, published in Kodansha's Magazine Fresh)
- A.I. Love You (A・Iが止まらない!, A・I ga Tomaranai) (1994–1997; serialized in Kodansha's Weekly Shōnen Magazine)
- Itsudatte My Santa! (いつだってMyサンタ!) (1997; one-shot, published in Kodansha's Weekly Shōnen Magazine)
- Love Hina (ラブひな) (1998–2001; serialized in Kodansha's Weekly Shōnen Magazine)
- Negima! Magister Negi Magi (魔法先生ネギま!, Mahō Sensei Negima) (2003–2012; serialized in Kodansha's Weekly Shōnen Magazine)
- Ground Defense Force! Mao-chan (陸上防衛隊まおちゃん, Rikujō Bōeitai Mao-chan) (2003–2004; story only, serialized in Kodansha's Magazine Special)
- Negiho (ネギほ) (2010–2011; story only, serialized in Kodansha's Bessatsu Shōnen Magazine)
- UQ Holder! (2013–2022; serialized in Kodansha's Weekly Shōnen Magazine and later Bessatsu Shōnen Magazine)

=== Anime ===
- Ground Defense Force! Mao-chan (陸上防衛隊まおちゃん, Rikujō Bōeitai Mao-chan) (2002; original concept, produced by Xebec)
