= Japan Cartoonists Association =

Japanese association for manga artists

- Native name: 日本漫画家協会
- Industry: Manga
- Founded: December 15, 1964
- Founder: Hidazo Kondo
- Headquarters: Tokyo, Japan
- Website: nihonmangakakyokai.or.jp

The Japan Cartoonists Association (Japanese: 日本漫画家協会, Hepburn: Nihon Mangaka Kyokai), established April 1, 2014, is a Japanese public interest incorporated association and professional association of manga artists. Its predecessor was a voluntary organization of the same name founded on December 15, 1964.

As of November 2020, the president is Machiko Satonaka, and the executive directors are Ken Akamatsu, Ippongi Bang, Takahiro Ozawa "Ume", Miso Suzuki, Noriko Nagano, Mitsuru Miura, and George Morikawa. In addition, the former chairman of the board of directors, Tetsuya Chiba, was appointed chairman.

== Overview ==
The main purpose of the association is "to conduct business related to the dissemination of manga, to encourage creation of manga, to promote manga worldwide, and to contribute to the development of Japanese culture". The organization also organizes and co-sponsors local manga exhibitions and sponsors the Japan Cartoonists Association Award.

The association's offices were located in the "Gingaku Building" in Ginza, Tokyo, from its establishment until 1986.

The YANASE Rabbit Building in Shinjuku, Tokyo, which has been occupied since around 2000, was owned by Takashi Yanase, the fifth president of the association, and it is reported that Yanase did not receive any rent from the association before his death. As of 2015, it is known that he donated the land and building near the building to the association.

=== History ===
For a long time in Japan, there were no professional associations for cartoonists to interact with each other or to negotiate with the government or foreign countries, and there were only groups of individual cartoonists with joint production characteristics, such as the "Manga Group" and the "Dokuritsu Manga School. Isao Kojima of the "Dokuritsu Manga School" thought that "cartoonists from all fields should get together and create an environment where they can recognize each other through social activities and feel secure as artists" and "I wanted to create an association where they could at least join health insurance. In the summer of 1964, he approached Yoshiro Kato, Eijiro Shiota, and Fuyuhiko Okabe of the Manga Group for advice. The Manga Group brought Tatsumi Nishikawa, who had a businessman's background and administrative skills, to Kojima, and eventually they were able to hold a founding meeting on December 15 of the same year.

In 1965, the board of directors established the Health Insurance Department, Taxation Department, Bulletin Department, Copyright Department, and Overseas Department; in 1966, the Planning Department was added; in 1985, the Planning Department was renamed the Business Department, the Bulletin Department the Public Relations Department, and the General Affairs Department was created. Kojima recalls that, on association business, he and the copyright holders went to protest against companies that manufactured character products without permission, and that he accompanied cartoonists who had suffered non-payment of manuscript fees to the publishers.

=== Presidents of the Board of Directors ===
Name	Period in office
Hideo Kondo	December 1964 – May 1976
Yukio Sugiura	May 1976 – May 1981
Yoshiro Kato	June 1981 – June 1992
Kō Kojima	June 1992 – May 2000
Takashi Yanase	May 2000 – July 2012
Tetsuya Chiba	July 2012 – June 2018
Machiko Satonaka	June 2018 – present
