= Higashikurumeshi Chikurin Park =

Park in Higashikurume, Tokyo, Japan

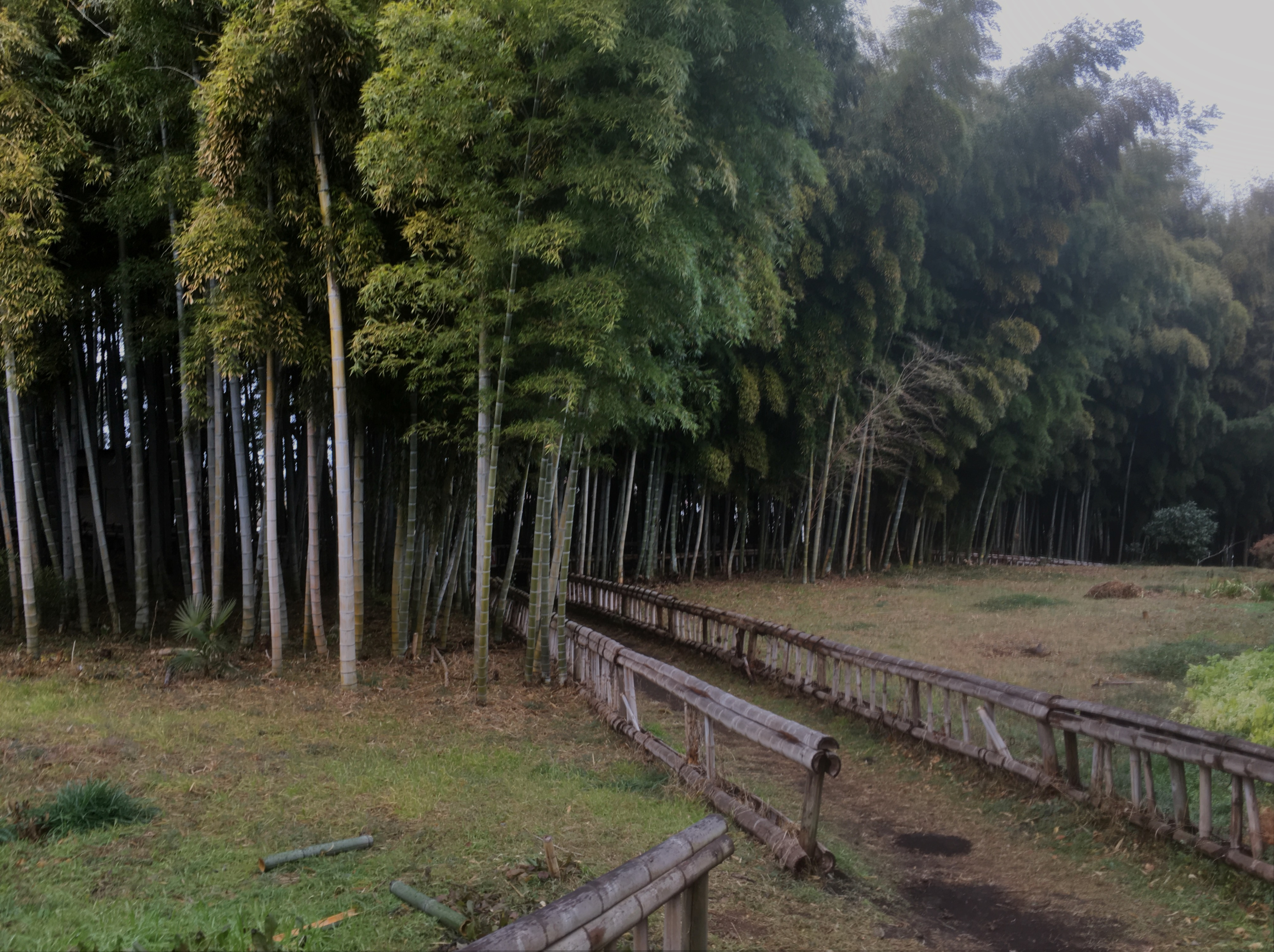
- Interactive map of Higashikurumeshi Chikurin Park
- Location: Higashikurume, Tokyo, Japan
- Coordinates: 35°45′17.3″N 139°32′4.5″E
- Area: 3,300m
- Created: 1974
- Public transit: Higashi-Kurume Station

Higashikurumeshi Chikurin Park is a bamboo grove with natural spring water. It is located in Higashikurume, Tokyo. It was created by taking advantage of the natural shape of the land, and there is a path through the bamboo grove. The park has over 2,000 bamboo trees.

It was constructed in 1974 and was selected as one of the 100 New Tokyo Views in 1983.

== Gallery ==
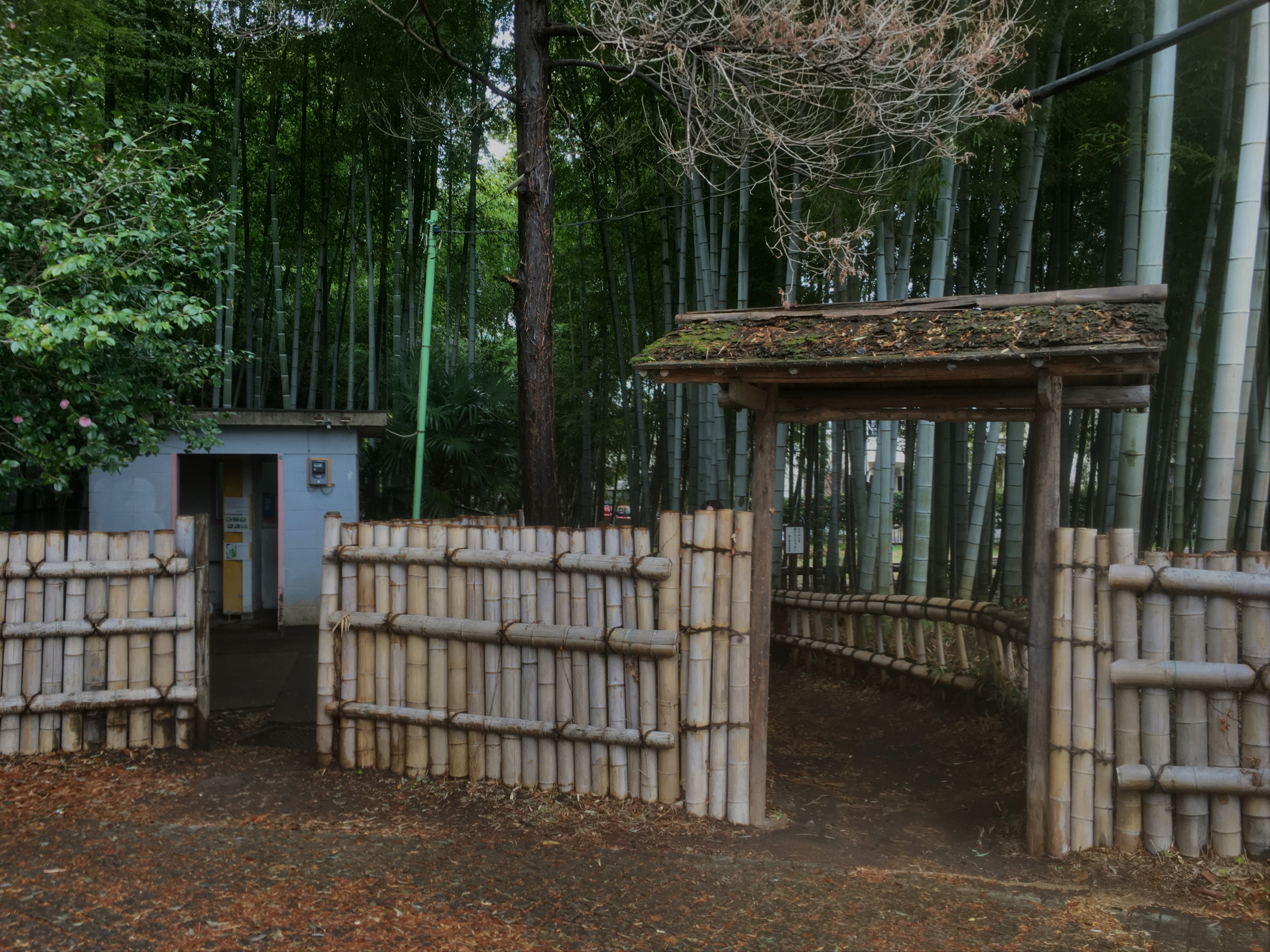

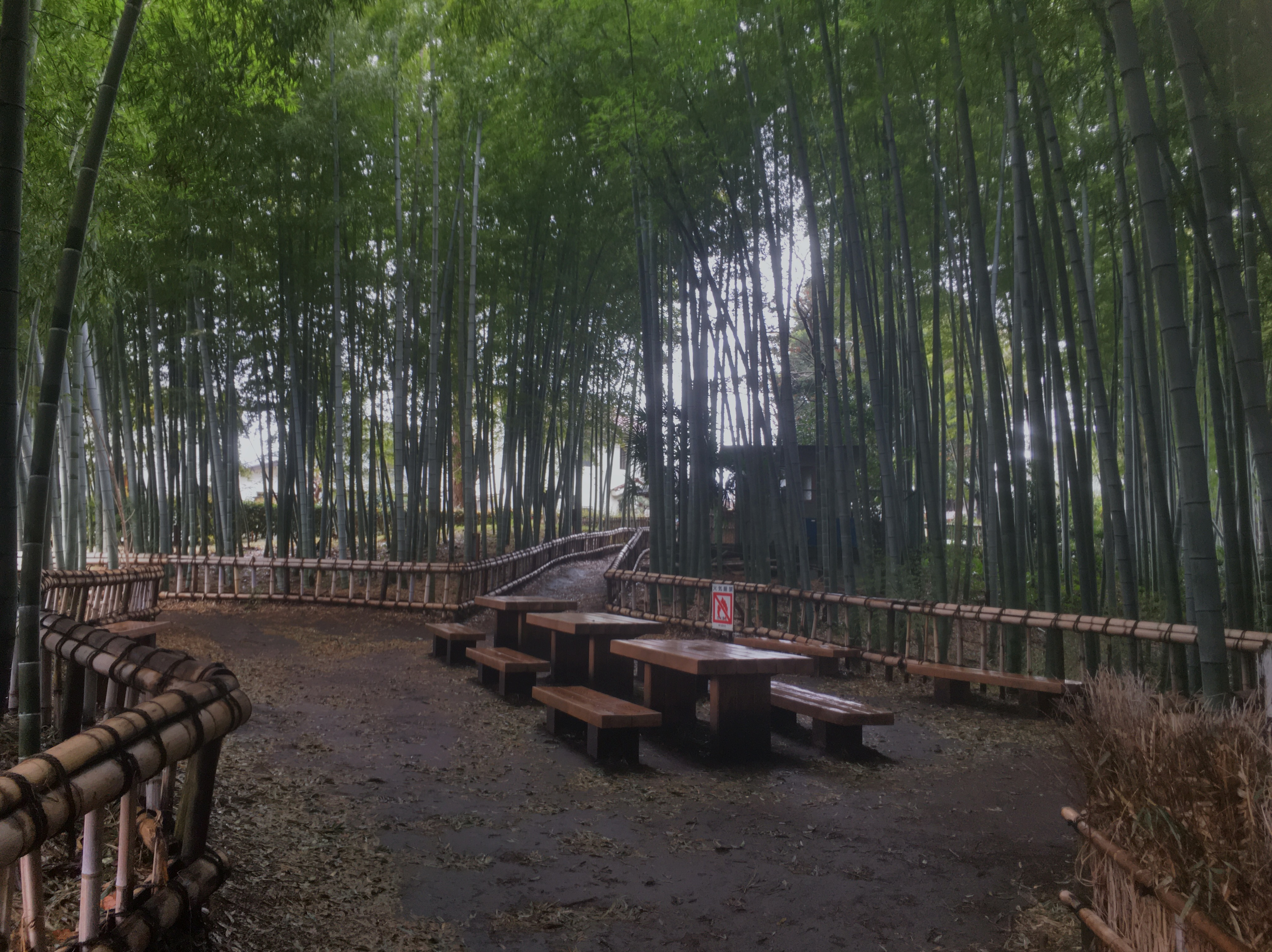

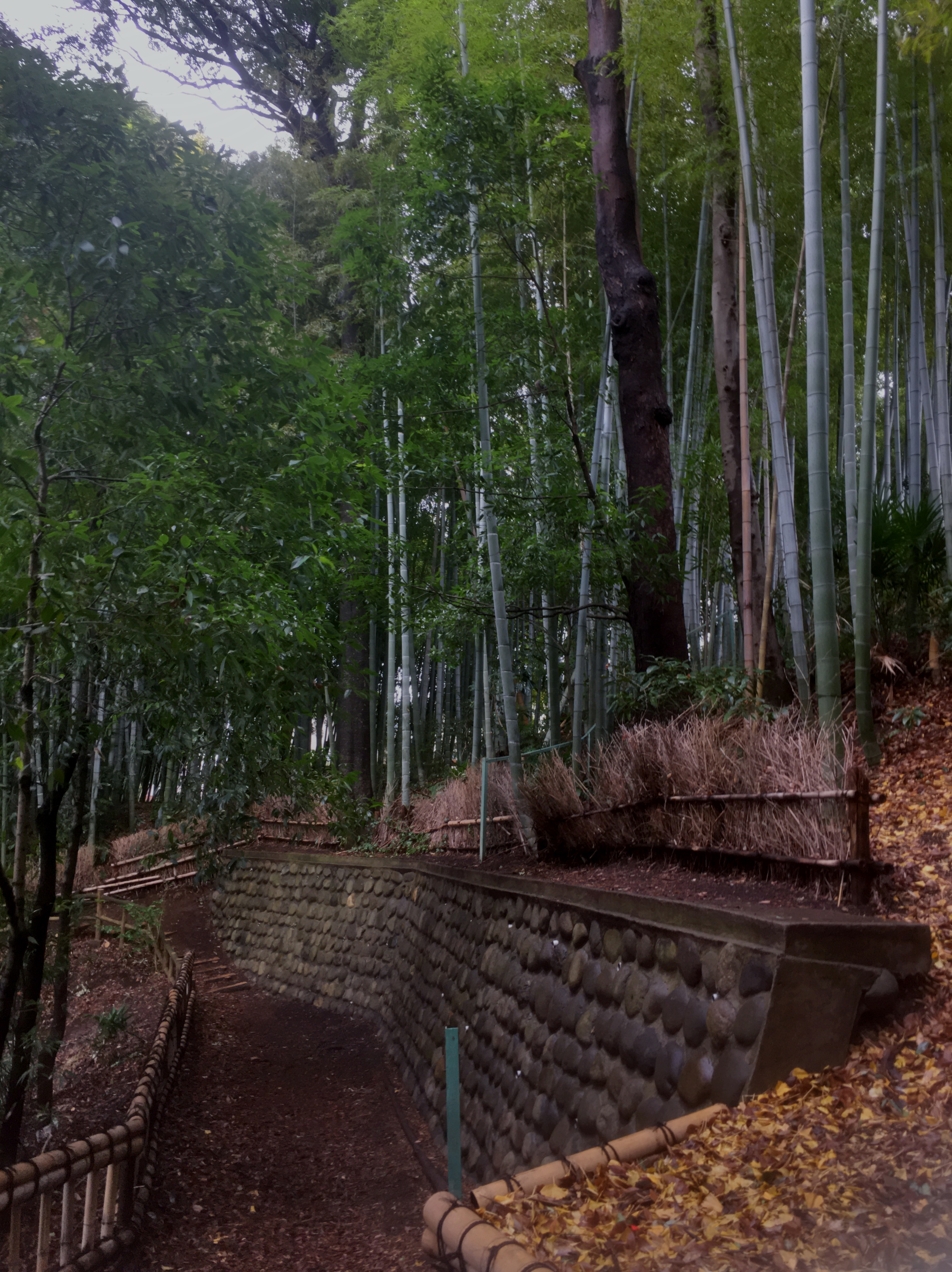
