= Ground Defense Force! Mao-chan =

Japanese anime TV series

陸上防衛隊まおちゃん (Rikujō Bōeitai Mao-chan)
- Created by: Ken Akamatsu
- Anime television series
- Directed by: Yoshiaki Iwasaki
- Produced by: Atsushi Moriyama; Kiyonori Hiramatsu
- Written by: Yōsuke Kuroda
- Music by: Takayuki Hattori
- Studio: Xebec
- Licensed by: NA: Geneon Entertainment
- Original network: TV Tokyo
- Original run: July 3, 2002 – December 25, 2002
- Episodes: 26
- Manga

Mao-chan
- Written by: Ken Akamatsu
- Published by: Kodansha
- English publisher: US: Del Rey Manga
- Magazine: Magazine Special
- Original run: July 2003 – October 2004
- Volumes: 2
- icon

Ground Defense Force! Mao-chan (Japanese: 陸上防衛隊まおちゃん, Hepburn: Rikujō Bōeitai Mao-chan), also known as Earth Defender! Mao-chan, is a Japanese anime television series created by Xebec.

== Plot ==
The series stars three eight-year-old girls, Mao, Misora and Sylvia, as they try to defend Earth against invading aliens. The world's defense has fallen into unlikely straits because the aliens are excessively cute, of which combat engagements are televised: if the forces battling the aliens were not cute themselves, the general public would revolt, as it would be seen as "bullying". Consequently, three military leaders chose their granddaughters to be the defenders, becoming a team even cuter than the aliens. They each have a clover-shaped badge that enables them to transform (this transformation provides no apparent special ability).

The series itself is rife with parodies and references, particularly to Akamatsu's earlier work Love Hina.

== Characters ==
Mao Onigawara
Voiced by: Kimiko Koyama (Japanese), Sandy Fox (English)
Mao is the girl with pink pigtails held by red bows, who defends Japan from the ground by using a plastic tank (the tank was officially named 'White Tiger,' but she refers to it as 'Mi-kun' because when she was little, she had a kitten she called Mi-kun, but it got lost in a river while she was playing near it one day. She re-named the tank that so it seemed it was still there). As revealed in assorted Physical Education scenes, she is a very slow runner. Her physical ability is minimal, but she more than makes up for it with her total seriousness in the spirit of defense. It is revealed that she has no mother and her father is busy with his own work as a secret spy for the Defense Forces. Her least favorite food is carrots. Her clover pin is green.
Her baton initiates the Defense Barrier.
Misora Tsukishima
Voiced by: Yūya Yoshikawa (Japanese), Kari Wahlgren (English)
Misora has purple-blue hair with a blue headband, and defends Japan from the air using an airplane. Her mother (and presumably her father, as well) is a diplomat, and thus is never home. As a result of this, she lives with her grandfather. Her clover pin is blue. Her transformed outfit features a pair of white-feathered wings on her back, which she can use to fly. She's fairly mature and the type who can come up with ideas all the time but physically can't carry them out. Misora's also an Honors student. In the anime, she is known for ending most of her sentences with "...I must say!" while in the manga, she says "Dont'cha know" and "If ya please" compared to her Japanese "arimasu."
Her baton activates the Reflection Barrier.
Silvia Maruyama
Voiced by: Yui Horie (Japanese), Julie Maddalena (English)
Silvia, nicknamed "Sylvie", who has a low grayish-black ponytail held by a green bow, defends Japan from the sea using a submarine. Despite her occupation as a member of the Japanese Maritime Self-Defense Force (JMSDF), she cannot swim. She has a somewhat curious affection for tangerines, and is frequently depicted eating them. Her clover pin is grey. She's Russian and a quarter Japanese despite speaking with a British accent in the English dub, she acts casual and even a little loopy. In the manga, she's crazy about fishing. Her transformation is different from the others, because right after the hat goes on her head, it flies up a bit, and the red part extends and droops down. Her name in the English-language subtitles is alternately written 'Sylvia", though the opening credits show her name as "Silvia". In episode 20 when they come face to face with Naru, Silvia makes plenty of allusions to Love Hina (such as, "When I close my eyes, memories from another life come back to me") because the Japanese voice actress who played Naru plays Silvia, hence, the past allusions, though the same voice actress isn't the case for the english version. In the anime, she is known to referring to herself as "I, the officer..." or the girls as "We, the officers...." In the manga, she uses a "surfer" dialect, using terms such as calling Mao and Misora "dudettes" or "girlfriends" in comparison to her Japanese use of "-yan" instead of "-chan." She has a Love Interest named Taro.
Her baton activates the Restriction Barrier.
Kagome Mishima
Voiced by: Miki Nagasawa (Japanese), Dorothy Elias-Fahn (English)
A Colonel in the Ground Self-Defense Force with an IQ of 250. She is assigned to be Mao-chan's homeroom teacher in order to watch over her for her (Mao's) grandfather who she is madly in love with. In the manga, she is revealed to be the striking image of Rikushiro's late wife, Kunie Onigawara. Despite her better judgement, she will do anything for Rikushiro if asked (and might regret the decision later). As she's pulling double duty with being the United Defense Force's commanding officer and the girls' homeroom teacher, she tends to be tired out a lot and is often asleep in class.
Bears a striking resemblance to Naru Narusegawa from Love Hina minus one hair antennae. The resemblance is noted upon in ep 20 when they come face to face with Naru, and as an added bonus for the english version, the same voice actress for Naru plays Kagome Mishima as well.
After the climactic battle in the manga, she is seen to be still teaching as Mao-chan's homeroom teacher three years later.
Yuriko Ōzora
Voiced by: Yukiko Mannaka (Japanese), Wendee Lee (English)
Yuriko, also known as Yuriko-senpai, is the student council president of her high school. She is actually half-alien (her father was a human, while her mother was an alien); as a result, she has a pair of cat ears that appear when she is nervous or upset. Due to her alien heritage, she attempts to further the Cute Alien's cause. She seems to suffer from an inferiority complex, which frequently hinders her mission. Yuriko also seems to be a fan of Mao-chan and her friends, which often prevents her from hurting them. In the anime, she even assumes the mantle of Lady of Purple Lily when Mao-chan and the others can't handle the current alien threats. In the manga, her hair is blonde, but in the anime it is red. After being branded and imprisoned as traitors with Chinami, she rebels against the alien's forces. Three years later, she's seen to be working with Chinami at their co-owned hot springs. She no longer hides her cat ears.
Chinami Noki
Voiced by: Ai Iura (Japanese), Kari Wahlgren (English)
Chinami is the vice president of the student council in the anime; thus, she is technically lower in rank than Yuriko, but she behaves as if it were the other way around, giving Yuriko orders and formulating plans on her own. However, in the manga, she is secretary of the student council. Chinami is presumably half-alien, as she has cat ears identical to Yuriko's (but Chinami's ears do not appear nearly as often as Yuriko's do). At first, she's secretly jealous of Yuriko's carefree personality and always being in the spotlight, but after winning the title of Queen of the Beach, she realizes that she prefers being a supporting character than a main one. After being branded and imprisoned as traitors with Yuriko, she rebels against the alien's forces. Three years later, she's seen to be working with Yuriko at their co-owned hot springs. Unlike Yuriko, she is not yet brave enough to reveal her cat ears to the public.
Rikushiro Onigawara
Voiced by: Akio Nojima (Japanese), Michael McConnohie (English)
Rikushiro is Mao's grandfather, and he gave her the green clover-shaped pin as a present for her eighth birthday. He is also the head of the Japanese Ground Self-Defense Force (JGSDF). Rikushiro is something of a doting grandfather (he had a weapon-free tank built especially for Mao, saying that his granddaughter deserved only the best toys), but he insists that Mao address him as 'Chief of Staff' instead of 'Grandpa.' His name is a play on words meaning "warrior of the land."
Sorajiro Tsukishima
Voiced by: Kiyonobu Suzuki (Japanese), Tony Pope (credited as Anthony Mozdy) (English)
Sorajiro is Misora's grandfather and the head of the Japanese Air Self-Defense Force (JASDF). His daughter (Misora's mother) is constantly away from home, so Misora lives with Sorajiro. He is always depicted as carrying what appears to be a plush-doll version of Captain Juzo Okita from Space Battleship Yamato. Rikushiro and Sorajiro have been rivals since their college days. Sorajiro enlisted his granddaughter in the Air Defence Forces just to keep up with Rikushiro.
Adalbert Von Marayuma
Voiced by: Takashi Taniguchi (Japanese), Ron Allen (English)
Adalbert is Sylvie's grandfather and the head of the Japanese Maritime Self-Defense Force (JMSDF). He is of German descent, and is almost always shown smoking a large cigar. Adalbert has a mischievous personality. Like Sylvia, he cannot swim either.
Emi Uehara
Voiced by: Machiko Toyoshima (Japanese)
Shoko Akasaka
Voiced by: Machiko Toyoshima (Japanese)
Mio Nanba
Voiced by: Chiaki Takahashi (Japanese)
Keinosuke Urashima / Keitaro Urashima

Voiced by: Yūji Ueda (Japanese), Derek Stephen Prince (English)
He has failed the Tokyo University entrance exam four times. Misora encounters him in the woods on Mt. Fuji in manga chapter 17 just as he is about to fail to commit suicide for the fourteenth time. Misora cheers him up just in time for him to receive 40 e-mail messages from the people who love him. Keinosuke mentions getting mail from his fiancée Nana, from Motoko and even from Tama-chan. Although he looks very much like the Keitaro from Love Hina, he is only referred to as Keitaro in the anime.
His only appearance in the anime is Episode 24 on Mao's TV where Naru uses a "Naru Punch" on him. However, he is briefly mentioned by Naru in the Episode 20 preview.
Nana Nanasegawa / Naru Narusegawa

Voiced by: Yui Horie (Japanese), Dorothy Elias-Fahn (English)
Appears twice in the show (once in ep 20, another in ep 25 on Mao's TV) as a carry over from Love Hina taking place after the aforementioned show. She's turned the Hinata dorms into an inn with her husband Keitaro, and is another victim of the cute aliens' shenanigans.
The manga seems to take place in a parallel world that contains many things that resemble Love Hina. In chapter 25 the Defense Force travels to Hinata Ryokan (hot springs resort) and are greeted by its proprietress Nana Nanasegawa and her fiancé Keinosuke Urashima. Nana looks very much like Naru in Love Hina. Based on the email she sent Keinosuke in chapter 17 she also has the same short temper.
Misorako "Kūko" Tsukushima
Voiced by: Tomoe Hanba (Japanese)
Misora's mother and an ambassador of Japan. She carries a plush doll of Yuki Mori from Space Battleship Yamato. In the anime, she is seen to be equipped with a packable glider that she can summon at will.
Carol Cameron
Voiced by: Masayo Kurata (Japanese), Michelle Ruff (English)
(Anime only) Carol is an 8 year old American Defense Force member who came to Japan to receive her support mecha armor developed by Toko. Upon meeting Mao-chan and company she shows admiration of them by kissing all three girls. Carol has a very outgoing personality. Her popularity with the chiefs of staff especially Rikushiro Onigawara made Kagome Mishima a bit jealous. Carol joins Kagome Mishima's class as an observer which surprises Mishima mistaking her age as junior high or high school. Carol excels both in academics and athletics, particularly soccer. Her only flaw is that she swoons when she sees a cute alien, getting her kidnapped and rescued by Mao-chan, subsequently learning the importance of the defense spirit. Carol Cameron's character design is based on Love Hina's Sara McDougal.
Rikukichi Onigawara
Voiced by: Kōji Haramaki (Japanese)
Mao's father. In the anime, he is only seen once in the second episode. However, in the manga, he is actually a double-agent for the Ground Defense Force, spying on the aliens until the time came to reveal himself. He is seen to be disguised in a dinosaur-type alien costume. He usually wears a veil over his face as to protect his identity.
Kuniko Onigawara
Voiced by: Satsuki Yukino (Japanese)
Mao's mother who died before the beginning of the series. Although she makes no appearance in the anime or revealed in the manga, she does give spiritual support to Mao-chan through her clover pin. She asks Yuriko to help defend Mao-chan, resulting in the Lady of Purple Lady identity.
Prime Minister
Voiced by: Jun'ichi Sugawara (Japanese), David Orosco (English)
Usually seen always wiping his face with a handkerchief, he cares about the well-being of Japan and tends to be a pushover. Whenever the United Defense Forces need to summon their Type-2 Gear or activate the Unified Defense Barrier, public support needs to be high enough before he can approve of their use. In the manga, his eyes are censored out with a black bar for a while.
In the manga, he is eventually replaced with another Prime Minister, who happens to have a grudge with Rikushiro Onigawara for something that happened 60 years ago. This Prime Minister does everything possible to discredit the United Defense Forces and replace them with his own trio of elementary students, The Three Aces Squadron, Haru, Natsu and Tou (which means "spring," "summer," and "winter," respectively). However, they are 11-year-old boys that use firearms instead of trying to solve the alien threat peacefully like the girls. It eventually becomes apparent that their "defense of Japan" are publicity stunts and cannot handle a real alien threat. The girls are eventually reinstated.
Kiku Ichimonji III
Voiced by: Yuri Shiratori (Japanese)
(Anime only) A small puppy-like robot on skis, built for the purpose of detecting Cute Aliens. It barks if it detects a Cute Alien. This was built by Toko when the aliens stopped sending advance warning letters. Girls tend to find him irresistibly cute. So much that it once made Mi-kun feel neglected by Mao-chan and ran away from home until he returned to save Mao and the girls. Although he can detect aliens, he has no combat capabilities whatsoever and is usually needed to be carried around.
Ichiro Steki
Voiced by Hirofumi Nojima (Japanese), Derek Stephen Prince (English)
(Anime only) A friend of the Prime Minister, Kagome is forced into an arranged marriage with him. He seems charming enough, but Kagome's heart lies elsewhere. After the marriage certificates are destroyed by the United Defense Barrier, he changes his mind about the marriage not being able to cope with Kagome's crazy lifestyle.
Galaxy the Great / Emperor Galactica
Voiced by: Keiichi Sonobe (Japanese), David Orosco (English)
The leader of the Cute Aliens and a fanatical collector of Japanese culture and landmarks. He loves hot springs and is usually seen soaking in one. His headquarters is located on the moon. In the manga, he is eventually befriended by Mao-chan and returns all the Japanese landmarks that he's stolen. Three years later, he's seen to be working with Yuriko and Chinami in their public bathhouse.
Tokusaburo "Toko" Tokugawa
Voiced by: Naoki Bandō (Japanese)
Toko is the chief engineer of the Ground Defense Force. He and his staff of female mechanics pieced together Mi-kun initially codenamed Byakko (White Tiger). He also created Kiku Ichimonji III, Kagome Mishima's support mecha Seiryuu (Blue Dragon) and Carol Cameron's support mecha suit.
Mayumi A.
Voiced by: Ryokichi Takahashi (Japanese), Julie Ann Taylor (English)
Mayumi is the only operator named among the three Love Hina Motoko look alike operators. She is a member of the Japanese Air Self-Defense Force (JASDF). Her nickname is "Mayu-Mayu."
Little King
Voiced by: Kurumi Mamiya (Japanese)
(Anime only) The little son of Emperor Galactica. Despite the fact the Cute Aliens stole it in the first place, Mao-chan gave her precious doll Kuniko to him to protect his smile. He doesn't appear in the manga.
Mi-kun
Mao-chan's toy-like support mecha. It is 1:1 scale German Tiger Tank. Initially codenamed by her grandfather as Byakko (White Tiger). Named after Mao-chan's lost kitten (later revealed to be the alien Omega), it has a protective nature of her. It was temporarily given weapons to protect Mao-chan, but later learned that Mao liked it better when there weren't any. Mao-chan gives Mi-kun one of her ribbons to wear as a symbolism of their friendship. Because it's a plastic model, it has no interior, so any passengers have to ride on top.
Hayate
Misora's toy-like support mecha. It is a 1:1 scale British Harrier jump jet. Like Mi-kun, it has no weapons and its own A.I. It also has no interior, so Misora must ride on the outside, usually on its wings.
Nah-chan
Sylvia's toy-like support mecha, a 1:1 scale DSV Shinkai 6500 deep sea submersible. Unlike the other two mecha it has a cockpit inside. The cockpit is a small living area where Sylvia lives. It has two extendable mechanical pincers to grip things with.
Seiryuu
(Blue Dragon) is Colonel Kagome Mishima's tank support mecha which is only 30% complete due to budget restrictions.
Cosmic Tama-chan
The turtle-like Cute Alien who two years prior taken and cared for by a group of female Japanese Defense officers. Before leaving Cosmic Tama-chan laid four egg like capsules. Three of which inside are the alien technology badges that is given to Mao-chan, Misora and Sylvie. The fourth egg contained a warning that Earth is targeted by Cute Aliens.

== Powers and abilities ==
According to the anime, the United Defense Force badges have the ability to summon the Light of Kusanagi. Originally hatched from Cosmic Tama-chan, the badges are able to download "Type-2 Gear" onto the wearer, which consists of a red band uniform and a double-ended baton.

The baton is summoned by a crystal orb that's tucked into a pouch in the belt of the uniform. The orb duplicates itself and connects to form the baton.

Mao-chan's green badge represents the Type-2 Ground Gear. Late in the anime, it gives Mao-chan roller blades to make up for her inability to run.

Misora-chan's blue badge represents Type-2 Flight Gear. These give Misora a pair of wings that she can use to fly, glide or hover.

Sylvia's gray badge represents Type-2 Marine Gear. Unlike the other two, her hat becomes a different shape.

Although the transformations are flashy, the badges don't enhance the physical capabilities of the girls. They can also be used as tracking beacons and communicators to the United Defense Force's headquarters.

It is also apparent in the anime that the badge can be used by anyone who knows how. Yuriko Ōzora is able to use Mao-chan's badge to transform herself into the Lady of Purple Lily.

The girls' main "attack" is the "United Defense Barrier." This focuses the Light of Kusanagi into one end of their batons and form a triangular barrier around the alien. Mao-chan initially begins the procedure by aiming the energy at Misora, who deflects it with her own baton toward Silvia, and then back to Mao-chan.

Mao usually trips and fails to catch the energy beam, which results in a good chunk of Japan to be decimated. In the manga, there is an extra chapter that supposedly takes place in an alternate future ten years later where under Rikushiro, they activate the barrier and Mao-chan misses her mark. With age comes more power, and the Light of Kusanagi is now powerful enough to obliterate planets. As a result, the planet Earth is destroyed.

== Episodes ==
No.	Title	Original release date
1	"I'll Protect Japan by Myself! / I, Myself, Will Protect Japan!"	July 3, 2002
The series begins with Mao Onigwara attempting to leap over a three-tier vaulting horse in her gym class. She doesn't make it. After talking with a sympathetic Misora, her toy tank Mi-Kun arrives to pick Mao up due to a giant cute alien about to land in Yokohama, Kanagawa Prefecture. There is a slight argument about the Prime Minister of Japan spending more budget for the United Defense Force, but Rikushiro Onigawara quickly ends the complaining by stating that the only way to defend against cuteness is with cuteness. The giant alien arrives and reveals itself to be a large, cute cat wearing a parachute. Mao, who had been waiting for its arrival, attempts to bonk the alien with her baton, but a gust of wind carries the cat away, causing Mao to scrape her knee. Mao is helpless to do anything because the cat is in the skies, an area where the Ground Defense cannot go. Suddenly, Second-Lieutenant Misora appears on her toy plane, Hayate to lend support. However, the cat eventually lands in the water where neither Mao nor Misora can go due to the area being inaccessible. As luck would have it, Private First-Class Silvia in her toy submarine Nah-chan arrives and pushes the cat alien back onto dry land. Silvia joins the other two where they find themselves helpless against the alien...and begin crying. Their exploits are being televised live and their sobs generate public sympathy, enough for a government-approved budget approval to use the $300,000 United Defense Barrier. Predictably, because of Mao-chan's lack of athletic prowess, they are unable to complete the barrier, resulting in exploding not only the alien, but a good chunk of the city. The public is sympathetic and forgives the girls.
2	"First Deployment of Mao-chan! / Mao-Chan's First Dispatch!"	July 10, 2002
The origin of Ground Defense Force Private Mao Onigawara, where she received her powers, and how she was chosen. It's Mao's 8th birthday and her grandfather, Rikushiro Onigawara (Ground Defense Force's Chief of Staff), gives her a mysterious green, clover-shaped badge that had been confiscated from aliens. Sensing the purity in her heart, the badge activates, blowing off the side of their house and reveals Mao in her Type-2 Ground Gear outfit. Almost immediately, Mao is recruited into the Ground Defense Force as a Private (to the astonishment of Field Grade First-Class Kagome Mishima). After talking with Misora, whose grandfather happens to be the Air Defense Force's Chief of Staff, Mao is summoned for her first defense of Japan. Despite her newfound gear, she is still only an eight-year-old girl and is scared to face the incoming alien. When the alien reveals itself to be nothing more than a tiny, cute bunny, Mao has conflicting feelings of doing her duty. She regretfully knocks out the alien with a gentle tap on the head with her baton. This is the only voiced anime appearance of Mao's father, Rikukichi Onigawara (his face concealed by a newspaper he's reading).
3	"The Air Defense Force, Misora-chan / Misora-chan of the Air Defense Force!"	July 17, 2002
The origin of Air Defense Force Second-Lieutenant Misora Tsukishima, where she received her powers, and how she was chosen. The episode starts off with Misora-chan watching Mao-chan on TV (who's practicing her salute). Unbeknownst to her, Sorajiro Tsukishima, her grandfather is spying on his granddaughter. Meanwhile, Rikushiro is explaining to a nameless officer the reason why his granddaughter is enlisted: if the Defense Forces used brute force on cute aliens, it would look to the public that they were bullies. Hence, they must use cuteness to defend against cuteness. Kagome Mishima walks in and agrees with Rikushiro (who she's still attracted to). The Chief of Staff suddenly asks her to do a favor for him, which she immediately agrees to without even hearing what it is—and ends up regretting her decision when she finds out that she has to be the new homeroom teacher of Mao-chan's class. After Mao and Misora get over this new development, Mao is presented with her own personal tank, albeit a life-size plastic model (some assembly required). Rikushiro dubs the tank "White Tiger" but Mao-chan quickly begins calling him "Mi-kun," which sticks. Suddenly, there is an alert of another alien heading to Japan in the same exact area from the previous episode. Mao-chan is immediately dispatched with her new tank. The alien is none other than a cute, black bat—that throws bombs. After being protected by an explosion by Mi-Kun, the alien bat escapes into the sky, where Mao-chan cannot follow. Out of nowhere, Misora-chan and Hayate come to lend their support. It seems that Sorajiro was jealous of his friend Rikushiro enlisting Mao into the Ground Defense Forces, so he decided to enlist his own granddaughter, Misora into the Air Defense Forces, complete with her own alien blue, clovered badge to summon Type-2 Flight Gear. The alien is sandwiched between Hayate and Misora, where it is defeated by a stern lecture from Misora. The episode ends with Mao-chan and Misora-chan riding back to headquarters with the cute alien cradled in their arms.
4	"The Sky and Land are One / Air and Ground are One!"	July 24, 2002
The episode begins with Mao visiting the new Air Defense Force headquarters with Misora. Rikushiro accuses Sorajiro of being a copycat, enlisting Misora the same way he enlisted Mao-chan. He's also angry that the airbase had been built within the same area as the Ground Defense headquarters. Sorajiro replies that the government approved of the idea. They both begin to argue about whose granddaughter's the cutest. The next school day, Mao accidentally bumps into Senior Student Body President, Yuriko Ōzora. Before the two can get acquainted, Chinami Noki dashes in and drags Yuriko away, reprimanding her of conversing with the enemy. Meanwhile, Sorajiro is arguing with the Prime Minister of the decision of the new Air Defense Force headquarters and the recruitment of Misora while Kagome is depressed that with the Defense Forces in the spotlight, she never spends time with the Chief of Staff anymore. Both Sorajiro and Rikushiro gather their granddaughters separately and order Mao and Misora not to fight together anymore. Of course, the girls aren't happy about it and brood quietly by themselves. An alien is about to appear, but to Sorajiro's chagrin, Rikushiro is able to deploy Misora before him. The alien reveals itself to be a giant, grayish-blue bird and begins chasing Misora, who becomes frightened. Mao-chan appears and after a quick flying glomp from Misora, the girls decide to fight together, regardless of their grandfather's orders. Mao-chan replies, "Besides, the ground and the sky are connected. All of Japan is Japan." Combining their batons, they unleash an energy shockwave that Yuriko refers to as the "Light of Kusanagi," to what Chinami replies is impossible since Mao and Misora are full-blooded earthlings. The power knocks the alien out of the sky. The girls then plead with their grandfathers to allow themselves to combine forces again, to which Sorajiro and Rikushiro reluctantly agree to.
5	"Sea Defense Force Silvia / Silvia of the Sea Defense Force!"	July 31, 2002
The origin of Sea Defense Force Private First-Class Silvia Maruyama, where she received her powers, and how she was chosen, thus completing the trinity of Ground, Air and Sea Defense Forces. Kagome gives a private lecture to both the Ground and Air Defense Force's Chiefs of Staff and their granddaughters about the origin of the alien invaders. Two years prior, the female members of the Ground Defense Force established contact with a cute alien, Cosmic Tama-chan, who they protected and took care of. Because of everyone's love of her, several months later, Cosmic Tama-chan laid four eggs. Three of the eggs hatched to become the alien clover badges that gives the girls their new gear while the fourth egg hatched a letter that warned Japan was being targeted for attack by cute aliens. Although they were unable to figure out what the alien's motives were, the Special Defense Forces were created. Later, an alien is detected in the atmosphere. Kagome rushes to summon Rikushiro, but due to circumstances that he refuses to explain, Kagome is left in charge of the mission. The cute alien reveals itself to be a giant, red fish with bulging eyes. This becomes a problem when the alien takes to the ocean where Mao and Misora cannot follow. Meanwhile, Rikushiro and Sorajiro appeared to have the same idea and sneaked out to grab the third and final clover badge. However, the badge had already been claimed by the Sea Defense Force's Chief of Staff, Adalbert Von Marayuma, which was given to his granddaughter, Silvia Maruyama. Silvia summons her Type-2 Marine Gear, only to reveal that she can't defend the seas because of her inability to swim. With some encouragement from Mao and Misora, Sylvia attempts to summon the power of her baton, which sends out a powerful blast of light that explodes the ocean and forces the cute alien (which was knocked out) to float up to the surface. The trio finally complete, the question that lingers in everyone's minds: "What will the future be for the Special Defense Forces?"
6	"Anyways, Let's Have a Meal / Shall We Eat Something For Now?"	August 7, 2002
The episode begins with the revealing of the new addition to the Defense Forces, the Sea Defense Force headquarters. While Mao and Misora admire it in awe, Rikushiro and Sorajiro look at it with loathing, furious that they were both copied (although Rikushiro quickly points out that Sorajiro's not one to talk as Sorajiro copied Rikushiro in the first place). Sylvia transfers into Mao and Misora's class. Kagome is asleep at her desk when class starts, so Sylvia is forced to introduce herself by herself. Sylvia asks one of the children to give her seat up by the window so she can sit next to Mao-chan. After school, Sylvia invites Mao and Misora to her house (which happens to be the Sea Defense Force headquarters) for some tangerines. When an alien becomes detected, Mao and Misora are shocked to realize that Sylvia's room is actually the inside of Nah-chan! To make matters worse, the girls are stuck in the middle of the ocean so they're unable to do anything. Forced to leave everything to Sylvia, the girls end up releasing the cute alien by using Nah-chan to grab its capsule and knock it against some rocks. This causes the alien inside (a dolphin) to get knocked out without a fight, scoring another victory for the Defense Forces!
7	"I'll Defend Even the Water Striders! / We Even Defend Against a Water Skipper!"	August 14, 2002
This episode begins from the perspective of Yuriko Ōzora, where she dreamt of a scene from her childhood, where she learns from her "father" that her mother was an alien. She is told that from then on, she has to live her life as an alien. Meanwhile, a bored Kagome is holding the class's physical education period where they must run a lap around the track. As expected, Mao-chan ends up being passed by everyone. Afterwards, the girls are approached by Yuriko, who wants to take their picture, explaining that she's a big fan of theirs. Mao and Misora see no problem in that, but Sylvia is hesitant because every picture of her makes her look ditzy due to her mouth always hanging open. Assured from Mao that's always what she looks like, Sylvia agrees to take the shot. Right before the picture's taken, Sylvia quickly fires off a long equation (5 + 4 + 2 + 7 + 12 + 18 - 46) that confuses Mao and Misora, resulting in the girls' photo to display Mao and Misora with confused looks on their faces while Sylvia smiles and displays the "victory" sign with her fingers (which happens to be the answer to the math equation: 2). Later, Chinami berates Yuriko for making friends with the girls, especially since they're supposed to be alien spies. Chinami begins to wonder how the girls are able to bring out the power of Kusanagi. She also releases a small, cute, white mouse alien, Jirocho, to transfer the picture and data of the girls back to the alien's homebase. Mao, Misora and Sylvia finish their cleaning assignment of sweeping leaves when they suddenly notice a cat that's cornered Jirocho against a tree. The girls panic and Mao calls Ground Defense headquarters for permission to summon her Type-2 Ground Gear to defend the helpless mouse. Rikushiro is at the headquarters and gives Mao permission for "special training". Meanwhile, Kagome finishes grading her student's math problems with lightning speed and rushes off back to headquarters to see the Chief of Staff, but halts at the sight of Mao-chan in her Type-2 Ground Gear. The cat (which Sylvia dubs "Orochi") and Mao have a staredown, neither of them making the first move. Sylvia decides to make the first move instead and reaches out to the cat in hopes of taming it, her hand is quickly scratched at. It looks as if the girls are helpless when Kagome comes running in. One glare from her and the cat immediately loses its ferociousness and flees. The girls are grateful for Kagome's assistance, although she's bewildered because she didn't really do anything. Yuriko and Chinami watch the entire scene hidden behind a building, where Yuriko praises Mao-chan for her bravery, resulting in Chinami scolding her once again. As the girls head home singing victorious, the episode ends with a scene of the alien's homebase where Emperor Galactica receives the picture of Mao-chan and the others.
8	"Project "Defense Barrier!""	August 21, 2002
The episode begins with Mao-chan training to summon the Light of Kusanagi at will. Mao is unable to wield it properly and the energy blast becomes unstable, firing randomly. However, Sylvia is able to fire with 98% accuracy. Yuriko and Chinami are secretly watching the girls' training and Chinami reveals that the aliens are almost ready to attack. Meanwhile, Kagome is presenting Rikushiro the Defense Forces' new project: the "United Defense Barrier." (The same move that the girls attempted in the first episode.) Surrounding the alien in a triangular formation, the girls would summon the Light of Kusanagi and restrain the alien within its boundaries. The plan finds resistance from all three Chiefs of Staff who'd rather have their own granddaughters defend individually. A new alien capsule is detected, but the size is larger than any of its predecessors. The girls are deployed, persuading their grandfathers to reconsider using the Defense Barrier. They are ready to defend......when it's found that the orbit of the capsule was misjudged and passed straight by the Earth. The girls are stunned at first, but quickly celebrate another successful defense. The episode ends with Emperor Galactica saying "Mistake."
9	"Formation, Total Defense Party / The Unified Defense Force Formed!"	August 28, 2002
The Japanese government passes a bill that combines the Ground, Air and Sea Defense Forces into the Unified Defense Force. Kagome watches this news on TV unconcerned until it is revealed that she's put in charge of the girls. This causes her to panic as it means that she'll be seeing the three of them both at school AND at headquarters, giving her no time to be close to Rikushiro. She is initially depressed until Rikushiro calls her to inform Kagome of her new position. Not able to say no, she enthusiastically agrees, only to begin sobbing on the couch as she hangs up. The double duty of teacher and commanding officer of the United Defense Force begins to take its toll on her and eventually needs to take a sick day off from teaching. She starts to finally enjoy a day of relaxation and eat some ramen when Mao, Misora and Sylvia pay her a sympathy visit. Not wanting to get caught playing hookie, Kagome doesn't answer her door. In response, Sylvia summons her Type-2 Marine Gear and blasts her front door off its hinges, saying that it was an emergency action in an emergency situation. Under the cloud of dust, Kagome quickly envelops her body under the covers and pretends to be sick. The girls are suddenly alerted about another alien attack and reluctantly head out (but not before Sylvia finishes eating Kagome's ramen). Before leaving, Mao-chan leaves Kagome some "get-well bread," a.k.a. her leftover lunch, Misora leaves some custard pudding and Sylvia leaves a pint-size carton of milk. Back at headquarters, Rikushiro decides to take command in Kagome's absence, but Kagome herself (touched by the sympathy of the girls) comes back to take charge, realizing that whether she wants to or not, the girls need her.
10	"Japan Collection Mission / Operation Japan Collection!"	September 4, 2002
As the episode begins, the Unified Defense Force has been dispatched to the landing site of a giant alien, 300 km from the shoreline. The water bursts open as an alien capsule shoots out of its surface to reveal a cute, giant sheep. Unable to contend with the enormous alien, the girls retreat behind Mi-kun. The sheep begins making its way to the Shin-Yokohama Station. Paralyzed with fear, the girls continue to sob until Mi-kun and Hayate decide to go after the sheep themselves. Knowing full well that they are only plastic and unarmored, Mi-kun and Hayate attempt to stop the sheep. The girls catch up to the vehicles only to watch in horror as Mi-kun begins to get crushed by the giant alien. Not being able to bear the thought of losing Mi-kun, Mao-chan runs toward the alien when suddenly her badge begins to glow. The girls quickly get into position for the United Defense Barrier and finally succeed in activating it. Sylvia forgot to run into position, so the barrier was wasted and the giant sheep is able to steal the Bullet Train. Although they failed to stop the theft, the girls are overjoyed that Mi-kun and Hayate are safe. The episode ends with Emperor Galactica enjoying his possession of the stolen train.
11	"Put Everything Aside, It's a Field Day! / Before Everything Else, A Sports Meet!"	September 11, 2002
After failing their defense of Japan in the previous episode, the United Defense Forces realize the aliens' true motives: stealing Japan's famous landmarks. Kagome suggests that they begin creating a strategy for countermeasures to protect the landmarks, but the Chiefs of Staff have another issue on their minds... Their granddaughters out-of-season sports competition. The sports meet begins with a televised broadcast, the Chiefs of Staff as guests of honor, a tired Kagome and an introduction by the Prime Minister (who had skipped the Japan/US summit). The meet goes underway with Misora winning a relay race and Sylvia winning the "throw-the-balls-in-the basket" race (where her throwing accuracy happens to be 100%). Mao-chan fails in every event she tries, causing an embarrassment to Rikushiro. Desperate, Rikushiro asks Kagome to help make Mao an active participant in her team's victory, promising to take her to a high-class restaurant if she succeeds (to which Kagome enthusiastically agrees). The final event in the sports meet is the "borrowing objects" competition. Each participant must run down a length of track to a table with a piece of folded paper. Inside is listed an object that they must find and bring to the finish line. Kagome arranges for an easy item to be found by Mao-chan. The race starts and the other contestants quickly pass Mao to discover that all the papers are unmarked except one specifically labeled for "Mao-chan only." Misora's paper lists "a pretty girl" while Sylvia's states "a girl with glasses." Mao finally manages to get to her designated paper, opens it up and freezes with a sad look on her face... Meanwhile, Misora and Sylvia manage to find Yuriko and Chinami (who happened to be spying on them) and use them for their "objects." Panicking, Rikushiro leaps from his seat and urges her to find the object listed on the paper. However, Mao mournfully replies that she can't do it, because the object that she's supposed to find is her "mother," someone that she doesn't have. Heartbroken, Mao begins to cry where she stands. Everyone stops in their tracks and are saddened by her crying, some of them breaking into tears themselves. Taking pity on her, Kagome walks up to Mao-chan and says that she'll be her mother. This cheers Mao up and with a round of applause by everyone, Mao and Kagome make their way hand-in-hand to the finish line. Later that night, Kagome arrives at the restaurant that Rikushiro promised her. She draws stares from the other patrons in her purple evening gown and no glasses. At first she is excited to see the Chief of Staff waving her over from their table, but quickly becomes disappointed when she sees Mao-chan is with them as well. The episode ends with Rikushiro raising a toast to Mao's fine contribution to her team's victory, but becomes puzzled when Kagome begins to cry.
12	"Asleep or Awake, We Must Defend! / Awake or Asleep, We Will Defend!"	September 18, 2002
The episode begins with the United Defense Forces failing to stop the giant sheep alien from stealing more Japanese landmarks. Rikushiro is furious of the constant losses and states that next time they'll defend at all costs. Sorajiro replies that they have no idea where and when the aliens will target next, but Aldalbert comes in and shows them an advanced notice received from the aliens. Angry of the alien's cockiness, Rikushiro sends out the United Defense Forces to the target location, the stone lion in Okinawa. While they wait to be dispatched, Kagome and the girls hang out at the beach's shoreline. However, when it's time for lunch, the girls don't seem to recognize Yuriko and Chinami as their servers. As they take a nap under the sun, it becomes apparent that their food was drugged. As the giant, cute alien arrives (this time a sea serpent), the girls are half-drowzy and seem to be in no condition to defend, yet they transform into their Type-2 Gear anyway while Chinami and Yuriko spy on them. Permission is given to launch the Defense Barrier and the girls drag themselves into position. To Chinami's chagrin, Mao, Misora and Sylvia finally manage to complete the United Defense Barrier with no problems in their sleepy state. With the successful defense, the Chiefs of Staff stand proudly with their granddaughters in front of the press, stating that the United Defense Forces can defend even in their sleep. On that note, the public celebrates their victory......while Kagome finally wakes up under the night sky and is shocked to find herself alone on the beach.
13	"My Mother Came! / Mother Has Come, I Say!"	September 25, 2002
As the episode begins, Misora heads to school as usual......by jumping out of a blimp. She begins to wonder how her mother, Kūko Tsukushima, a Japanese diplomat, is doing. It turns out that Misora's mother has returned to Japan and barges into Sorajiro's office. She is none too pleased at him as she had just found out that her daughter had been recruited into the Air Defense Force. Despite some arguments from Sorajiro, Kūko puts her foot down and decides to take Misora with her. Gliding in through the classroom window on her own personal glider, Kūko interrupts the class to pick Misora up. Without giving Misora any chance to argue, she picks Misora up in her arms and glides away into the sky. Mao-chan and Sylvia find themselves in a predicament as without Misora, the girls can no longer activate the United Defense Barrier, let alone be the United Defense Forces. Meanwhile, Kūko has finished packing up Misora's things, but Misora is still hesitant about leaving her responsibilities and friends behind. As they begin their journey out of Japan on the glider, Misora gets alerted that another alien has arrived. Despite her mother's insistence of not going, Misora decides to go and help her friends. Letting go of the glider, Misora freefalls and tells her mother that she wants to defend Japan with her friends because Japan is their home and wants to keep it safe for her parents to come back anytime they want to. Misora activates her Type-2 Flight Gear and summons Hayate to take her to where Mao-chan and Sylvia are. This time the cute alien is a giant cow that's stealing Japan's fish shipments. Mao and Sylvia can only hide helplessly until Misora flies in to save them. With the trio reunited, they deploy the United Defense Barrier successfully. Seeing the Light of Kusanagi from her sky-high view, Kūko has second thoughts about taking Misora with her. After reprimanding her daughter for worrying her like that, Kūko agrees that Misora should stay with the United Defense Forces to protect Japan. And with that, the press takes a snapshot of the United Defense Forces along with Kūko, to which Misora replies that the Defense Forces will defend Japan forever.
14	"Defense Headquarters Crisis / Headquarters of the Defense Forces in Imminent Danger!"	October 2, 2002
The episode begins with the United Defense headquarters receiving a wrapped-up alien capsule. The Chiefs of Staff are absent for the day's meeting. The security guard in charge opens the capsule, only to release an alien with a cuteness factor that can immobilize anyone who comes into visual contact with it. Kagome arrives in the command center apparently from her apartment due to the lack of her usual uniform. Being acting commander, she orders a security lockdown to prevent the alien from infiltrating any further. She also deploys the Ground Defense Forces (the actual soldiers, not Mao-chan) to head off the alien and defend the headquarters. Kagome quickly tries to contact Mao-chan, but Mao and the girls are busy at the school's pool, their badges inside lockers. The alien proceeds even further into the base, any resistance is immediately defeated by its cuteness. Kagome finally manages to trap the alien within security barriers, but one of the operators (named Mayumi) catches a glimpse of it and sways under its bewitching influence, releasing it from its captivity. Despite the base being on full lockdown, Mao and the others manage to make their way from outside to the control room through an air duct. Kagome quickly dispatches the trio after the alien with special equipment...blindfolds. The girls are sent to intercept the cute alien, but it easily passes them due to their lack of sight. Mi-kun smashes through a wall and stops the alien by knocking into it. Wondering why the alien had stopped, Kagome asks for a visual onscreen while the girls remove their blindfolds......Hours later, Rikushiro arrives at the headquarters and finds all the personnel on base are still immboilized. Demanding to know what happened, his eyes look up at the onscreen visual of Mi-kun and sees the cute alien begin to emerge from the tank's shadow. The episode ends with Rikushiro bewitched by its cuteness.
15	"Kikuchimonji the III Enters! / Kikuchimonji the III Debuts!"	October 9, 2002
The aliens have stopped sending warning letters to the United Defense Forces. As a result, more of Japan's landmarks are stolen, leaving the Defense Forces at a disadvantage. Rikushiro had anticipated this and had the Ground Defense Force's chief engineer, Toko, create a new warning system that could detect cute aliens faster than anything else in Japan. They reveal their new creation, Kiku Ichimonji III, a cute, robot puppy on skis. Kagome tells the girls that "Kiku-chan" isn't a pet and that the Defense Forces spent 70% of their budget to create him. Regardless, the girls take their new friend to school and show him off. As the students fawn over Kiku-chan, the new member of the Defense Forces immediately starts barking, sensing a cute alien nearby... Meanwhile, Yuriko and Chinami have dispatched their alien mouse, Jirocho, to steal the next Japanese artifact, the smallest vase in the world. Out of nowhere, Kiku-chan has led Mao, Misora and Sylvia straight to their position. The girls inquire why Yuriko and Chinami are there and Chinami attempts to make an excuse. Kiku-chan keeps barking in their general direction which causes Sylvia to quickly disbelieve their story. As Sylvia presses on, Yuriko and Chinami's alien cat ears pop out of their head. Thinking quickly, Chinami diverts the girl's attention into the building where the vase is residing and says that they saw a cute alien running in. Headquarters confirms this and the girls transform into their Type-2 Gear. Jirocho comes out with the vase only to be stopped by the United Defense Forces who stand ready for him. In a case of overkill, the girls quickly and easily defeat the mouse alien with the United Defense Barrier. Hiding behind the corner of the building with Yuriko, Chinami silently apologizes for sacrificing him. It is a bittersweet victory when the girls realize that although they stopped the alien theft, the vase was smashed in the process. The next day, Yuriko and Chinami brood over the disaster from the day before when the girls pop out of nowhere with Kiku-chan barking at them again. Sylvia wastes no time in bringing up the cat ears. In a desperate attempt to cover up their alien identity, Yuriko and Chinami pull out headbands with cat ears and begin to flaunt around with them. For them, they're forced to wear them in front of the rest of the student body. However, they're able to fool everyone by using their status of high-ranking student council members, but at the expense of their dignity.
16	"Mi-kun Ran Away / Mi-Kun Has Run Away from Home!"	October 16, 2002
Kikuchimonji the III has been popular with everyone recently. Whether in the classroom or with the female mechanics, Kiku-chan has been the attention of everyone's eyes. However, Mi-kun starts feeling neglected and eventually runs away. Mao becomes depressed by the tank's disappearance, but is forced to leave for another mission without it. While Mi-kun ponders whether it's ready for the scrap yard, the girls face a giant crab alien. It has already disable Hayate in a mountain of bubbles. Sylvia makes a remark that this alien is "rather ugly" which enrages the crab and begins chasing the girls, eventually trapping them in suds as well. Meanwhile, while Chinami is distracted by the sight of the alien's successful attack, Yuriko spots Mi-kun brooding by itself. She gives a quick pep talk of how she wants to help, but can't and reminds Mi-kun that it still has the ability to defend the girls if it wants to. The girls find that despite Kiku-chan's cuteness, it's useless in combat. As the crab alien looms over them, they begin sobbing in fright and Mao-chan shouts for help and eventually cries for Mi-kun. Out of nowhere, Mi-kun leaps out of nowhere, flips the crab over and frees the girls from their imprisonment. Mao is overjoyed to see Mi-kun again, but Sylvia reminds her that they should finish the alien off while they have the chance. After a successful defense, Mao and the others ride off back to headquarters on Mi-kun......and completely forget Hayate who's still trapped in the crab's suds. It's no surprise that the next day, it's Hayate who's disappeared and the girls have no idea why.
17	"An Actor's Road is Harsh... / The Way of Art is a Thorny Path!"	October 23, 2002
The girls are rehearsing for a play about the Defense Forces they're about to perform the next day. Mao plays a cute alien, Misora, a damsel in distress and Sylvia plays the solo Defense Force member and activates her Type-2 Marine Gear. Sylvia gets caught up in her performance and almost blasts Mao-chan with the Light of Kusanagi. Misora snaps her out of it and a trembling Mao-chan notices that if Sylvia hadn't stopped, she would've gone through with her attack. To Mao and Misora's relief, Kagome steps in and reprimands Sylvia for downloading her Type-2 Marine Gear 23 times. She tells the girls that if they're going to do a play about the Defense Forces, they should do it the normal way as downloading the Type-2 Gear comes out of the Defense Force budget. Mao asks if Kagome can take part in the play too. She is reluctant at first, but quickly changes her attitude when she learns Rikushiro will be seeing the play. The girls quickly get Kagome into costume—a bunny suit. Kagome wonders why she has to wear it, yet alone why a costume even exists in the elementary school. The girls are now worried about casting. Mao doesn't want to play an alien anymore. Sylvia agrees and thinks for a few seconds. That's when she notices Yuriko and Chinami spying on them and quickly casts them into the play. Yuriko will play the "princess in distress" in a maid outfit while Chinami will be the "cute alien" being the only cast member in an animal outfit. While the girls convince Kagome to keep the bunny girl outfit, Chinami tells Yuriko that while they pretend to be acting their parts, they'll steal away the girls' pins. Yuriko puts up some resistance and collapses to the ground. Thinking it part of the rehearsal, the girls quickly get into character with Kagome dispatching them to defend. Realizing that the rehearsal's started, Chinami begins to gloat that the Defense members can't win because they haven't downloaded their Type-2 Gear. Kagome stands offstage confused as this wasn't in the script, but agrees with Chinami's observation. The girls begin to retreat, but Chinami picks Yuriko up and uses her as a hostage. She states that the "Princess" gets weak when she blows down her neck (which she does seductively), causing Yuriko to go limp. The girls plead to stop harming Yuriko to which Chinami replies that she'll stop on the condition that they hand over their badges. Feeling that it's necessary in order to help Yuriko, Mao gives up her badge with almost no hesitation. Misora and Sylvia follow suit. Yuriko and Kagome are touched by their performance. Chinami finally seeing victory in their grasp, reaches for Mao's badge......when Mi-kun, Hayate and the soldiers of the Defense Forces burst into the gymnasium to protect the girls from the "alien thief," arresting Chinami and taken into custody. Kagome congratulate the Defense Forces for their quick reaction, but is confused due to the performance was supposed to be all a rehearsal. The episode ends with Chinami sitting in a holding cell about to be thoroughly interrogated.
18	"The Cheerful Snow Festival! / Heave-Ho at the Snow Festival!"	October 30, 2002
The Defense Forces have come to Sapporo to assist in helping with ice sculptures. Despite all the complex art pieces, the snowmen created by the girls grab the most attention. Meanwhile, Chinami and Yuriko are awaiting a rendezvous with another alien...in the middle of a snowstorm. Chinami wonders if they're waiting in the right location. Yuriko takes out a piece of paper that has their instructions on it. Chinami is shocked to find that the written "instructions" from Emperor Galactica is nothing but just a big "Oh!" The girls wander through the festival enjoying the comfortable weather when Sylvia points over toward the mountains and draws attention to the dark clouds hovering over it saying that the weather is bad enough for people to get lost up there. She continues to mention that bears and people in distress are common in places like that. Ironically, as Sylvia says all this, Chinami and Yuriko are experiencing exactly what she describes, meeting up with their alien, a black bear with a white muzzle, and getting lost in the snowstorm. Events coincidentally happen to the two as the girls of the Defense Forces describe the dangers of being trapped in a snowstorm, such as almost falling asleep, taking shelter in a cave and keeping each other warm with body heat. Eventually Sylvia and Misora begin to tell Mao that it couldn't possibly happen, but Mao-chan leaves before they can convince her otherwise. A search party is formed to find Mao, who is now convinced that there are people that need to be rescued in the mountains. Mao transforms into her Type-2 Ground Gear as not to be so cold, but to no effect. The transformation alerts Misora and Hayate to Mao-chan's location and comes to rescue her immediately. Chinami and Yuriko are happy to see Mao-chan too, but are blown away by Hayate's jets and begin rolling down the mountain in giant snowballs. The snowballs form an enormous snowman to which Kiku-chan begins barking at. Still unaware of Chinami and Yuriko, the girls form the United Defense Barrier around them, effectively rescuing the two. Not sure what to do about Emperor Galactica's order, Yuriko and Chinami send back an ice chest with a mini snowman inside. Emperor Galactica is thrilled to see the little piece of Japan, but due to being in an open hot springs environment, the snowman quickly melts in his hand and he yells out in disappointment.
19	"Apples - Tangerines - Melons"	November 6, 2002
The episode begins with the girls enjoying a snack. Mao eats pieces of apple, Misora snacks on melon and Sylvia munchs on tangerines. Suddenly, Kagome alerts them to another alien attack, this time three of them all at the same time: the apple orchard at Aomori Prefecture, the tangerines at the Ehime Prefecture, and the melons at the Kumamoto Prefecture. The girls split up to protect their favorite fruit producers. The aliens are small enough for the girls to handle on their own. However, it becomes apparent that the three targets were distractions for the alien's real target: the United Defense Headquarters itself. A giant red dragon bursts out from the ocean and towers over the base. It seems that the girls won't be able to return in time. Furious that the headquarters is helpless to resist, Kagome makes her way to the hangar to bring out HER support vehicle. Because of the budget cuts, it's only at 30%, but she resolves to go anyway. The hangar opens and reveals Kagome's tank, the Blue Dragon. The alien dragon is intimidated at first, but due to Kagome forgetting to turn off her megaphone, she reveals that she was only buying some time for Mao-chan and the others to arrive. In a chivalrous gesture of goodwill, Rikushiro comes to Kagome's aid and states that he'll be the dragon's next opponent. Touched by how important she is to him, Kagome begins to sob into Rikushiro's chest, drawing tears from everyone watching, including the dragon. This display was long enough for Mao-chan and the others to return. They waste no time and deploy the United Defense Barrier, defeating the alien. Rikushiro thanks Kagome for helping to defend them, to which she's overflowing with tears. Mao brings up that she brought souvineir apples from her mission and Rikushiro quickly rushes over and begins chomping on them, leaving Kagome to sob that she can't believe that she was beaten out by apples.
20	"To the Hot Springs to Pass the Exams for Tokyo U! / Let's Go to the Hot Springs to Pass the Tokyo U Exam!"	November 13, 2002
The famous "Love Hina crossover" episode. The United Defense Forces (the girls, Kagome and the Chiefs of Staff) arrive at the Hinata Inn on a company trip. Sylvia closes her eyes and says that she can almost remember another life. This joke doesn't make sense in the English dub, but in the original Japanese version, Sylvia's played by Yui Horie, who's also the original voice actress for Naru Narusegawa. This cues the appearance of the landlady of the Inn, who Sylvia keeps Misora from asking her name, stating that it's an adult thing. Mao-chan is astonished that the landlady looks almost exactly Kagome. This is referenced by the English dub by using the same voice actress, Dorothy Elias-Fahn, to reprise her role as Naru. As the Chiefs of Staff enjoy a friendly table tennis competition amongst each other, Kagome and the girls soak in the hot springs. They notice that the inn seems raggity, cuing a super-apologetic Naru. She blames it all on her husband and states that he won't fix anything, to which Kagome realizes why the inn was discounted and cheap. Suddenly, Naru pulls out her Tama radar and says that her husband's having another affair again. She storms out, but not before firing off a Naru punch through a wall, which explains the REAL reason why the inn is in shambles. This leaves the United Defense Forces without a host, as none of the usual Hinata residents happen to be there. When Sylvia brings up the possibility of the inn becoming bankrupt, Mao unites the girls into working the lodge until the landlady returns. Another guest appears, an alien monkey. The girls are unaware of the predicament and it is up to Kagome to figure out what the true motive of the alien is. After remembering what Rikushiro once said about the hot springs giving good luck to those who try to pass the Tokyo U exam, she gets the idea that the alien's trying to pass the Tokyo U exam so it can become wealthy and take over the corporate businesses, destroying Japan from within. Of course, the real target is the hot springs themselves and before she can warn the girls, the Chiefs of Staff find the hot springs gone. Kagome quickly gets the girls to download their Type-2 Gear and asks Sylvia to call Nah-chan. Surprisingly, Nah-chan is able to burst out through the dried up hotsprings with the monkey alien in tow. Kagome explains that the hot springs was actually connected to an underwater tunnel to the ocean. The girls activate the United Defense Barrier and begin celebrating......until Naru shows up and is horrified to see all of the collateral damage the Defense Barrier caused. It was a bittersweet victory as they defended Japan, but couldn't stop the Hinata hotsprings from being destroyed.
21	"American Defense Girl / American Defense Force Girl"	November 20, 2002
Special Envoy Carol Cameron is an 8 year-old American Defense Force member who's arrived in Japan to pick up new Defense weaponry from the Japanese United Defense Forces. Despite being the same age, Carol is a head taller than the other girls and is excited to meet the United Defense Force members that she's heard so much about. She greets the three girls with a kiss on the cheek, making Mao and Misora blush (and the Chiefs of Staff pucker up until Kagome gives them a stern glare and asks what the three grown men are thinking). The new weapon is a special mech armor that Toko specially built for Carol. This special armor gives her superhuman strength and the ability to fly. After Carol impresses the girls in their class with her excitedness in their class, the enormous size of her lunch and her powerful athletic ability (her sports uniform displays the Xebec logo), the Defense Force members are alerted of another alien attack. When asked where the alien is, headquarters tells them to look to their left. The girls are stunned to see the alien is a giant armadillo (how they missed it isn't explained). Before Mao and the others can download their Type-2 Gear, Carol activates her new armor for a test drive. She kicks the alien into the air, but it remains unharmed. It opens up and Carol is completely awestruck by its cuteness and proceeds to hug it. However, it turns out that Carol's new armor is the alien's target as it traps her inside of its indestructible shell and quickly rolls away. The girls transform and begin running after the alien on foot with Mao falling behind. Mao wants to defend Carol and surprisingly, her badge responds to her spirit of defense and releases the Light of Kusanagi. Her Type-2 Ground Gear upgrades to a pair of jet blades that allows her to ram into the alien, releasing Carol and sending all three of them flying. Carol manages to catch Mao in midair and now understands that defending Japan doesn't necessarily mean using brute force. The United Defense Forces activate their Defense Barrier and manage to defeat the alien. The episode ends with Carol flying back to America with Mao and the others waving goodbye.
22	"Let's Defend Happiness!"	November 27, 2002
It's no secret by now that Kagome has her heart set on the Chief of Staff, Rikushiro. However, he doesn't seem to realize this as he offers her an arranged marriage. Mao and Misora are none the wiser as they are excited for her while Sylvia's women's intuition is telling her that something's not right about it. Time passes and it's time for the arranged marriage meeting. Kagome's still not pleased with the plan. It doesn't take Kagome much convincing to sign the papers when Rikushiro flashes one of his irresistible smiles. She snaps out of her daze and realizes in horror what she's done. Meanwhile, the girls spot another incoming alien (a kangaroo) in their general area and vow to stop it without interrupting the meeting. They manage to find it, but the alien is too fast for them to catch up with. Eventually, the girls decide to split up and surround it before launching the United Defense Barrier. The girls corner the alien......in the same building that the meeting is taking place. Rikushiro opens up the doors to figure out what all the ruckus is about. He looks down and notices the barrier beam, unintentionally allowing the alien to escape. The building destroyed, the suitor fleeing and the marriage certificates incinerated, Rikushiro apologizes to Kagome and says that they should probably forget the whole thing ever happened. Kagome displays relief while Sylvia quips that they shouldn't need an arranged marriage when Kagome's got someone in mind. Clueless, Mao, Misora and Rikushiro ask who the certain someone is. Kagome looks into the Chief of Staff's eyes and replies that it's the person right in front of her. Rikushiro thinks for a moment and then turns around to look at who's in front of her, albeit, behind him. At that moment a man on a bike pedals past them, causing Rikushiro to chase him down with Kagome running after them, pleading that wasn't what she meant. The episode ends with Emperor Galactica receiving the stolen item.
23	"I'm Sorry, Mi-kun"	December 4, 2002
With Mao's new rollerblades, she's now able to surpass Mi-kun in a footrace. After the two smash into a rock wall, Kagome alerts the girls that another alien is approaching, this time the Lighthouse in Inubousuki. The girls transform and head for the Pacific Ocean using Nah-chan. After travelling for a while, they eventually realize that the alien (a giant whale) is directly underneath them. The alien blasts them out of the water, ejecting them from Nah-chan. Mao and Misora are okay, but Sylvia needs a quick saving as she can't swim. They believe they're safe until the whale bursts out of the water and towers over them, intent in swallowing the girls up. Completely helpless, they cry out for someone, anyone to help them. Mao cries out for her mother, causing her badge to glow. The clover's glow resonates with Mi-kun's own and in a surprising move, Mi-kun barrels out of the hangar, roars off a cliff and begins flying toward the girls' position. Headquarters is stunned by this turn of events, but Rikushiro believes that Mao's mother might be responsible. The whale is about to dive and swallow the girls, but flinches at the sight of a glowing object rocketing toward it. Mao realizes that it's Mi-kun to the rescue by sacrificing itself to defeat the alien. Despite Mao's pleas, Mi-kun is destroyed on impact... Mao and Mi-kun's relationship throughout the series flashs before her eyes... Sometime later, Mao is overjoyed to find that Mi-kun has been repaired and finally hears Mi-kun's voice for the first time (although it's really Kagome's voice via walkie-talkie). Mao promises that she and Mi-kun will defend the peace of Japan.
24	"The Woman of the Purple Lilies / Lady of Purple Lily"	December 11, 2002
Mao-chan is once again running late for school today. As she runs for the school gate, Misora, Sylvia, Yuriko and Chinami are waiting for her. Chinami tells Mao that she has to make it through the gate before the bell finishes ringing or she's considered late. In a last-ditch effort, Mao makes a flying dive. She lands face first in the ground, but she makes it. As the girls head off to class, Yuriko finds Mao's clover badge on the ground. Later at headquarters, Rikushiro and Kagome are shocked to hear that Mao lost her badge. Mao and the girls aren't too happy and begin wailing. Kagome is sent to alert the entire base while Rikushiro sends Mao home. The girls aren't too happy with the decision, but Mao goes home nonetheless. Meanwhile, Yuriko watches Mao with a guilty conscience, knowing that the right thing to do would be to return the badge, but she's still on the alien's side... Mao spends the rest of the day watching a scene from Love Hina on TV hugging her doll Kunie-chan (a doll named after and given to by her mother of the same name). The broadcast is interrupted by a special televised report of Misora and Sylvia defending against the most recent alien attack, a giant seahorse. The two can't do much by themselves and Mao decides that even without her badge, she's going to try to defend anyway. As if hearing her, Mi-kun drives by and picks her up. Hayate tries to help, but gets immobilized by the alien. The same happens to Misora and Sylvia. Mao and Mi-kun arrive to help, but meet the same fate. Chinami and Yuriko watch the action from a safe distance. Chinami is thrilled that the last line of defense is finally out of the way, but Yuriko is sympathetic toward the girls. She takes out Mao's clover badge which begins glowing. A woman's voice begins speaking through the badge (most likely Mao's mother) pleading for Yuriko to help Mao and defend everyone's smiles. It looks as if the alien is going to finish Mao off, but a blast from a Defense baton eliminates the Defense Forces' imprisonment. A girl wearing an adult-sized Defense uniform (obviously Yuriko to only Chinami) comes to the girls' aid. She activates a never-before-seen ability with Mao's baton, encircling the giant alien in a purple ring of light and transports it back to the alien's home base. A successful defense and no one catching onto the identity of the Lady of Purple Lady, Yuriko promises Mao-chan to return the badge back to her later. Chinami is slightly irked that Yuriko helped the girls again, but Yuriko's secretly glad to have protected their smiles nonetheless.
25	"Protect the Memories / Defense of Memories"	December 18, 2002
The episode begins with the Defense Force girls showing off their greatest treasures, dolls given to them by their parents and grandparents. Suddenly, Kagome and Kiku-chan come running in and alert the girls that another alien has appeared right behind them. Startled, Mao and Sylvia toss their dolls up in the air. The target this time is Mao-chan's doll, Kunie-chan. Mao, Misora and Sylvia begin to download their Type-2 Gear, but Kagome interrupts them, reminding the girls that they can only use their powers in DEFENSE, never to initiate attacks. Although Misora and Sylvia still want to go after the alien, Mao-chan says that Kagome's right and that a Defense Force member never goes against the philosophy of defense. Regardless, Misora and Sylvia offer their dolls to Mao-chan to replace the one she lost. It becomes apparent how depressed Mao is when she doesn't show up for class the next day, her spirit of defense broken. Yuriko leaves school early only to be chased down by Chinami. Chinami says that Mao's depression is an advantage for the alien's operation, but Yuriko finally snaps back at her, hating that Chinami has to say things like that. As Yuriko runs off, Chinami mutters to herself that she can't blame her as she also believes that headquarters went too far this time. Mao reminisces about Kunie-chan, which has been with her since she was born. She resolves that if she quits being a Defense member, Mao can go after the alien freely. She runs out of her house and heads toward the Defense Force headquarters, ready to hand in her badge. After tripping, she's stopped by Mi-kun. Hayate, Misora and Sylvia soon arrive afterwards in their Type-2 Gear, who were given permission by Sorajiro and Adalbert (who also appear) to protect Mao-chan's smile, thereby still defending and not going against the Defense Forces' code. Kagome and Rikushiro arrive on Blue Dragon, giving Mao permission to defend her memories of Kunie-chan. Soon, the entire United Defense Force (the actual force), the Japanese public and the Prime Minister all arrive, supporting Mao-chan. Yuriko and Chinami watch this from behind a building, Chinami saying that she didn't see or hear anything that's going on, therefore nothing to report to headquarters. The girls are ready to go after the culprit when Sylvia brings up the question that causes everyone's celebration to be brought to an abrupt halt: "Where and how do they find the cute alien?"
26	"Today I'll Defend Loosely as Usual! / Today's Defense is Yuru-Yuru Too!"	December 25, 2002
The Defense Force arrives at the alien base, but the alien boss refuses to give up the Mao-chan's dolly because his kid has become attached to it. Seeing this, the Defense Force resolves to let the aliens keep the dolly, and the girls return to earth, ready to defend whenever another cute alien threat comes.
