= Tokyo Metropolitan Ordinance Regarding the Healthy Development of Youths =

1964 legislation in Tokyo, Japan

Tokyo Metropolitan Assembly
- Territorial extent: Tokyo, Japan
- Enacted: 1 August 1964

The Tokyo Metropolitan Ordinance Regarding the Healthy Development of Youths (東京都青少年の健全な育成に関する条例, Tōkyō-to Seishōnen no Kenzen na Ikusei ni Kansuru Jōrei) is a prefectural law passed by the Tokyo Metropolitan Assembly on 1 August 1964. Its purpose is to promote the healthy development of people under the age of 18 by restricting their access to published material that is considered inappropriate. The restrictions are primarily carried out through self-regulation by the publishing industry.

The Ordinance was controversially revised in December 2010 to expand the definition of "harmful publications" and to give the Metropolitan government greater powers to enforce the law's provisions.

== Introduction ==
According to Michiko Nagaoko, director of a non-profit organization in Kyoto called Juvenile Guide, founded in 2003, approximately half of the 2,000 pornographic animation titles distributed in Japan every year, including films and video games, feature schoolgirl characters. On 11 March 2008, UNICEF Japan issued a statement calling for further tightening of child pornography laws in Japan, including the ban of sexual depictions of minors in manga, anime and video games. Such a ban was not considered by Japan's officials at the time.

=== Sale of restricted works ===
Currently, works that are "restricted" under the ordinance bear a mark labeling them as "seinen" (成年, "adult") or "18-kin" (１８禁, "18+"); retailers are required to shelve such material separately from unrestricted works and to perform age-checks on purchasers of restricted material. Publisher self-regulation and retail compliance is administered by the Shuppan Rinri Kyogikai (出版倫理協議会,, Council on Publishing Ethics), which is operated by the Japan Book Publishers Association.

=== "Nonexistent youth" bill ===
On 24 February 2010, the Metropolitan government submitted a proposed revision to the ordinance that would restrict sexually provocative depictions of fictional characters who appear to be under 18 years of age, referred to in the bill as "non-existent youths" (非実在青少年, hijitsuzai seishōnen). This proposal was criticised by many manga authors and received strong opposition from the publishing industry, the Writers Guild of Japan and the Japan Federation of Bar Associations, and was rejected by the Tokyo Metropolitan Assembly on 16 June 2010. Voting on the bill was put on hold until June, and Shintarō Ishihara, the governor of Tokyo, admitted that the bill's language needed revision.

Despite revisions made which changed "nonexistent youths" to "depicted youths", the bill continued to be opposed by the Democratic Party of Japan and was rejected by the Assembly in June.

== Bill 156 ==
After the original bill's defeat, Tokyo governor Shintarō Ishihara announced his intent to submit a new revision later in the year. This revision, informally referred to as Bill 156, was submitted by the government in November 2010. It removed the controversial "non-existent youth" term but still proposed a number of significant changes to the law:

- The Metropolitan government is given the authority to propose controls on internet access for children of different ages, although it is required to consult with the telecommunications industry, parents' representatives and educators.
- The definition of harmful material is expanded to include "any manga, animation, or pictures (but not including real life pictures or footage) that features either sexual or pseudo sexual acts that would be illegal in real life, or sexual or pseudo sexual acts between close relatives whose marriage would be illegal, where such depictions and/or presentations unjustifiably glorify or exaggerate the activity."
- Any publisher who has more than six works declared harmful under the new criteria in a 12-month period can be referred to the relevant industry self-regulation body. If the publisher breaches the criteria again within the next six months, the Governor can publicly identify the offender and comment on the reasons for declaring their work in breach.
- The Metropolitan government is authorised to "encourage the establishment of an environment where child pornography could be eliminated and prevent its creation." The bill specifically mentions "any sexually arousing posing on the behalf of children under the age of 13 wholly or partially naked, or wearing swimwear or only underwear, published in books or featured in film," although as with its other provisions this only applies to drawings and animation, not to photography or film of real children.
- The bill affirms the Metropolitan government's role in promoting safe use of the internet and increasing awareness of risks the medium poses.
- Internet filtering services to protect children from harmful content must be more widely accessible. Parents who wish to remove filtering from their children's mobile phones must submit a written request to their phone service provider, and this request must be for reasons the Metropolitan government considers justified.
- Parents and guardians must take responsibility for ensuring children in their care use the internet in a safe manner that limits their exposure to harmful material.

Like its predecessor, the bill was opposed by many writers, publishers and lawyers. However, the Japanese Parent Teacher Association expressed its support for the changes.

Bill 156 was approved by the Metropolitan Assembly's general affairs committee on 13 December 2010 and passed by the full Assembly two days later. The committee added a non-binding clause to the bill that calls on regulators to take into account "merits based on artistic, social, educational, and satirical criticism criteria" when evaluating publications under the revised law. Only two small political parties, the Japanese Communist Party and the Tokyo Seikatsusha Network, opposed the bill. The revised law took full effect on 1 July 2011.

=== Passage ===
A revised edition was presented in November to the Tokyo Metropolitan Assembly, which would require self-regulation of "'manga, anime and other images'...that 'unjustifiably glorify or emphasize' certain sexual or pseudo sexual acts...depictions of 'sexual or pseudo sexual acts that would be illegal in real life'". However, the bill no longer uses the term nonexistent youth and applies to all characters and to material that is not necessarily meant to be sexually stimulating. On 13 December 2010 it passed through committee. It was approved in December and will take full effect in July 2011. According to the Tokyo Metropolitan Government Office for Youth Affairs and Public Safety, the bill does not regulate mobile sites or downloaded and is only intended for publications such as books and DVDs.

=== Industry opposition ===
The original proposal was criticized by a group of manga artists, who prepared a statement for the Tokyo Metropolitan Assembly signed by many anime and manga industry personnel opposing the legislation. After Bill 156 passed through committee, Shueisha's management tried to calm worries for new manga artists. According to Anime News Network (ANN), at the New Manga Creators Awards ceremony Kazuhiko Torishima, senior managing director and editor, said he wanted "new manga authors to produce manga that would blow away [Tokyo Governor] Shintaro Ishihara" and Masahiko Ibaraki, editor-in-chief of its third editorial department, added that he did not want the increased regulations to have a chilling effect on their content and they would still feature anything that was exciting. In an interview with Ollie Barder of Forbes, Torishima explained his opposition. Firstly, he did not like that a political body was trying to decide creative expression. Secondly, because the restrictions would only apply to manga and anime, he viewed the bill as discriminating against those specific mediums while ignoring content from films or novels; noting how Ishihara was formerly a novelist himself. In addition, the Mobile Content Forum and a group of female yaoi authors voiced their opposition.

Takeshi Nogami announced the publication of an anti-Ordinance dōjinshi at Comiket 79, entitled An Idiot's Guide to Tokyo's Harmful Books Regulation. The all-ages dōjin sold out its first printing of over 1000 copies and went into a second printing; it will be officially translated into English & released online. In a blog post on 13 December 2010, the Japanese Prime Minister Naoto Kan expressed concern about the impact of the boycott and urged the parties involved to work towards resolving the situation.

The Association of Japanese Animations (AJA) along with the Comic 10 Society (コミック10社会, Comikku 10 Shakai) and several Japanese anime and manga publishers have voiced opposition to the bill. For its part, the AJA has voiced concerns the bill has major freedom of expression problems which are guaranteed by the Constitution of Japan. Specifically, the bill's scope and its vague requirements. In addition, the AJA said that they did not receive prior notice or hearings on the matter even though the bill deals with anime and thus it did not receive due process.

In response to the bill, Comic 10 Society has said it will boycott the 2011 Tokyo International Anime Fair organized by the AJA which, according to AJA, threatens the event's quality. Shueisha has asked anime production companies to pull its material and asked other publishers to do the same. In response, Shogakukan and Kodansha posted similar responses. Other vendors have backed out of the fair in response to the bill with rented space down 20%. The resulting cancellations TAF lowered its expectations ¥110 million (about US$1.3 million). According to ANN, the Japanese Prime Minister Naoto Kan wrote in his blog about the concerns of TAF's cancellation.

There is another topic I would like to talk about concerning [the strength of] the Japanese brand. Currently, there are concerns over the possibility that the Tokyo International Animation Fair could be cancelled due to controversies related to the healthy development of youth issues. Healthy development of youth is an important issue. At the same time, it is important that Japanese animation is broadcast to a global audience. I urge all parties involved to try to work toward preventing a situation where an international animation fair cannot be held within Tokyo.

— Naoto Kan

=== Enforcement ===
After some publishers asked for a list of standards required by the newly revised bill before they start the sale of a book, Mika Sakurai, the section chief of youth affairs at the Office for Youth Affairs and Public Safety, stated that the publishers can ask the government whether or not a specific work is subject to the law before sale, but a response might not be immediate as "the assessment may not be clear until release".

On 14 April 2011, a list of the first six titles to be "considered for restrictions" under the bill was published in the magazine Weekly Playboy, based on materials presented by the Tokyo Metropolitan Government during meetings with the Council on Publishing Ethics. The works listed include five seinen titles and one shōjo title, with reasons for restriction varying from "rape" and "incest" to "sexual intercourse in a school building". One week after the meeting, Masahiro Itosugi, the author of the listed work Aki Sora, announced that there would be no further reprints of volumes 1 and 3 of the manga after the law goes into effect in July 2011.

In March 2013, manga artist Yuzupon claimed on their Twitter account that the first volume of their work Welcome to Sugarpot, which was released about a month earlier, had been withdrawn from stores due to the Tokyo bill. The volume was still available digitally; the ordinance does not apply to digital sales.

In May 2014, the Imouto Paradise 2 manga became the first work to officially be restricted as "unhealthy" in Tokyo under the 2010 revisions to the youth law for "glorifying incestuous acts".

== See also ==
- Censorship in Japan
- Comics Code Authority
- Lolicon
