= A.I. Love You =

Japanese manga series

- Cover of the first tankōbon volume

A・Iが止まらない! (A.I. ga Tomaranai!)
- Genre: Romance; Science fiction
- Manga
- Written by: Ken Akamatsu
- Published by: Kodansha
- English publisher: NA: Tokyopop
- Magazine: Weekly Shōnen Magazine
- Original run: 1994 – 1997
- Volumes: 9
- icon

A.I. Love You (Japanese: A・I が止まらない!, Hepburn: A.I. ga Tomaranai!) is a Japanese manga series written and illustrated by Ken Akamatsu. The story follows Hitoshi Kōbe, a high school boy who is not good at anything but programming. He creates a program in particular named Program 30 which is that of a female, and is shocked when she comes to life in the real world due to a lightning storm. Hitoshi names her "Thirty" (Saati) and teaches her about the real world, while she instructs him on how to properly have a girlfriend. Things get more complex however when two more of Hitoshi's programs come to life, and a hacker goes after Saati's program. A.I. Love You was first serialized through Weekly Shōnen Magazine in 1994, but later moved to Magazine Special where it ended in 1997. The series was collected into nine manga volumes that Kodansha also released between 1994 and 1997. Two re-releases followed; however, each time a volume was deducted.

In 2003, Tokyopop acquired the license to release the series in North America. The story's title was changed but Tokyopop tried to keep a pun that had been used in the original Japanese title. Eight English language manga volumes were released between February 3, 2004, and April 12, 2005. The volumes were printed until 2009 when Tokyopop announced that the series would go out of print. The English adaptation was well received, and although reviewers pointed out that Akamatsu's artwork was not at the professional level yet, they praised the story and characters.

== Plot ==
The story centers on Hitoshi Kobe, an average first-year in high school who fails miserably in academic, athletic and social situations. He creates over thirty computer programs, all of which possess artificial intelligence and are able to rewrite themselves. The latest of his programs—which he names Thirty (Saati, the Japanese pronunciation of the English word "thirty")—is so advanced that it can converse just like a human.

One day, a freak lightning strike materializes Thirty into the real world, where she becomes Hitoshi's girlfriend. The series follows the two's lives, as well as other A.I.s of Hitoshi's creation as they attempt to keep Thirty's secret while she adapts to the lifestyle of humans.

== Characters ==
- Hitoshi Kobe (神戸 仁, Kōbe Hitoshi) is a freshman high-school student at Menjō High School who struggles at school both physically and in academics. He develops an ability to program and create artificial intelligence.
- Number Thirty (ナンバー サーティ, Nanbā Sāti) is the 30th A.I. program Hitoshi created, and is the first he loves.
- Number Twenty (ナンバー トゥエニー, Nanbā Tūenī) is Hitoshi's A.I. Program No. 20.
- Number Forty (ナンバー フォーティ, Nanbā Fōti) is Hitoshi's A.I. Program No. 40, the first he brought to life on purpose.
- Kimika Asoo (麻生 希美華, Asō Kimika) is a girl loved by Hitoshi to the point where he makes Twenty, who is almost identical in physical appearance to Kimika apart from looking about five years older and having much larger breasts. She never gives Hitoshi any consideration and played a trick on him at the beginning of the series.
- Nitta-sensei (新田先生) is Hitoshi's math and homeroom teacher.
- Makoto (まこと) is a boy who guards Kujūkuri Beach from litterbugs. Wanting to avoid getting hurt anymore by Makoto's booby traps, Hitoshi and Thirty help him collect every soft drink can buried in the sand, in and out of the water – 138,652 in total – which Makoto cashes in to build a special watchtower to guard the beach better.
- "Billy-G" (ビリー・G, Birī G) is a skilled computer programmer/hacker who lived briefly in the United States, producing operating systems. He was the main antagonist of Volume 3.
- A.I. Program No. 31 is Billy-G's version of Saati created from a back-up file when he captured her in Volume 3. She appears in Volume 8.
- Takako Miyahara (宮原 たかこ, Miyahara Takako) is a school newspaper reporter in Hitoshi's high school who wears glasses due to being far-sighted.
- Kikuko Kobe (神戸 菊子, Kōbe Kikuko) is Hitoshi's paternal cousin who lives in Aomori. She refers to Hitoshi as "big brother".
- A.I. Program No. 29 is Thirty's previous incarnation until a bug in her linguistics program caused her to be shut down, 80% of Twenty-Nine's programming went into making Saati.
- Misako Takemoto (竹本 美佐子, Takemoto Misako) is Forty's 26-year-old homeroom teacher who becomes the object of his first crush.
- Yuko Watanabe (渡辺 裕子, Watanabe Yūko) is a library representative in Hitoshi's high school who is referred to as the "Madonna of the Library". Her quiet nature compliment her 90 cm (35 in) D-cup bust.
- Misato Sekii (赤井 美里, Sekii Misato), Aki Ito (伊藤 亜紀, Itō Aki), and Ryoko Sakakihara (榊原 亮子, Sakakihara Ryōko): Three girls from class 2-D whose names are identifiable inside the school's system when Thirty and Hitoshi accidentally implant, then remove, Yuko's breast engorgement virus.
- Sayo Ishihara (石原 砂代, Ishihara Sayo) is a widow living with her child's family in Nerima, Sayo once worked as a Grade 1 teacher at Jinjō Elementary School in Nagano since 1926, but it was closed down in 1945 before she could hand out her last class' graduation diplomas. When she learns that the school was scheduled to be demolished, she starts an online diary in order to find her last students or allow them to find her.
- Chitose Yamazaki (山崎 千歳, Yamazaki Chitose) is the fraudulent owner/operator of the Yamazaki Dieters' Spa Resort in Izu that Toyotomi Hideyoshi allegedly visited during the Muromachi period. When Saati, Toeni, and Hitoshi found they had put on weight, Chitose took their money for ridiculous diet plans and ran.
- Yuzo Namako is president of Namako computer game company that employs Hitoshi and the girls when Twenty spends all their money.
- Cynthia McDougal (シンシア・マクドゥガル, Shinshia Makudougaru) is a Japanese-American teen idol who ran away from home to her mother's homeland due to her strained relationship with her father, who is CEO of IBN.
- Nakanishi (中西), Yamaguchi (山口), and Mizuki (三月): Three students from Hitoshi's class seen during rehearsals for their school festival play, The Little Mermaid, in Volume 7. Their surnames are identified by name-tags on their gym clothes, Nakanishi and Yamaguchi are the boys' surnames, Mizuki is the girl's.
- Yayoi Kobe (神戸 弥生, Kōbe Yayoi) and Ma-kun (まーくん, Mā-kun): Hitoshi's self-proclaimed "beautifully developed and big-breasted little sisters".

== Release ==
The chapters A.I. Love You were collected into nine tankōbon volumes between September 16, 1994, and October 17, 1997. The series was subsequently re-released by Kodansha through KC Deluxe from November, 1999 to June, 2000 this time though with eight volumes. The final re-release took place between November 17, 2004, and June 17, 2005, again by Kodansha, but with seven volumes.

In June 2003, A.I. Love You showed up on Tokyopop's website but was removed shortly afterwards. Tokyopop announced a month later though at Anime Expo 2003 that it had officially licensed the series for an English language release in North America. The first volume released came out on February 3, 2004, eight volumes were released altogether. Tokyopop released the final volume on April 12, 2005, and continued printing the series up until August 31, 2009, when it was announced that all eight volumes would be out of print. Despite being discontinued, the company offered returns for those who desired up until March 1, 2010. The discontinuation was a result of Kodansha letting its licenses expire with Tokyopop which led to the removal of some of company's biggest titles.

== Naming ==
The original Japanese title, A.I. ga Tomaranai! (A・I が止まらない!), is a play on words. Although it roughly means "Can't Stop Love" the word "A.I." has several meanings. Besides being the acronym for artificial intelligence, it is also the Japanese word for "love" (愛, ai) and the Japanese transcription of the English word "I" (アイ, Ai). Tokyopop did its best to recreate this pun with its US release of the series in which this case they added "Love You" to create a pun referring to the statement "I Love You" in A.(I. Love You).

== Reception ==
The English language adaptation of the manga has received reviews from various media outlets that provide feedback, and reception regarding the manga. Samantha from Manga Life gave the first book an A rating calling it a "very deep series". When talking about the characters, she said that they have bright personalities and are loveable overall. Allen Divers from Anime News Network also gave the first volume a review calling the story predictable. In his review of the first volume, Mike Dungan from Mania called the story "amateurish" saying that they have predictable plots to them. Mike praised the English release though for being far better when it comes to the artwork and design than the original Japanese release. He finished his review saying that although the artwork is not yet at the Love Hina level, Akamatsu's fans "don't want to do without it" citing the evolution of Akamatsu's artwork.
