= List of things named after Narendra Modi =

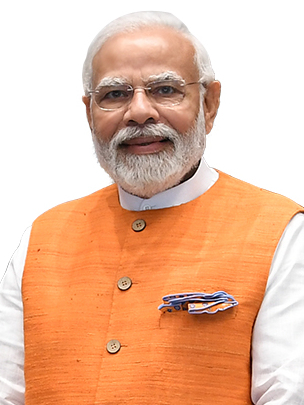

Narendra Modi is an Indian politician who is currently serving as the fourteenth Prime Minister of India, since 2014. Places and institutions named after him include:

== Airports ==
- NaMo Airport, Daman
- Narendra Modi International Airport, Noida

== Educational institutions ==
- Narendra Modi Medical College

== Stadiums ==
- Narendra Modi Stadium

== Parks ==
- NaMo Ghat
- NaMo Grand Central Park

== Roads ==
- Narendra Modi Marg, Sikkim

== Organisms ==
=== Animals ===
- Modi (a male Indian elephant in Kerala)
- Pseudozaphanera narendramodii (a whitefly species in Tamil Nadu)

=== Flowers ===
- Cymbidium Namo (an orchid variety in Sikkim)
- Dendrobium Narendra Modi (an orchid hybrid in Singapore)
- MODI (a chrysanthemum strain in Israel)
- Modi rose (a rose variety in Maharashtra)
- Namoh 108 (a lotus variety in Uttar Pradesh)

=== Fruits ===
- Modi (a mango variety in Uttar Pradesh)
- Modi-1, Modi-2, and Modi-3 (mango varieties in Bihar)
- NaMo (a mango variety in Madhya Pradesh)

== Food and beverages ==
- Modi burger (a type of burger)
- Modi masala chai (a type of flavoured tea)
- Modi thali (a type of meal)
- NaMo vada pav (a type of fast food)
- Modizza (a type of pizza)
- NaMo dhokla (a type of sweet snack)

== Fashion ==
- Modi kurta (a type of kurta popularised by Modi)

== Arts and media ==
=== Television ===
- India: The Modi Question
- Le monde selon Modi: La nouvelle puissance indienne
- Modi: Journey of a Common Man
- NaMo TV

=== Films ===
- Hu Narendra Modi Banva Mangu Chu
- Modi Ji Ki Beti
- Modi Kaka Ka Gaon
- PM Narendra Modi

=== Literature ===
- Price of the Modi Years
- Swarnim Bharat Ke Swapnadrishta Narendra Modi
- The Modi Effect

== Policies and schemes ==
- Modicare
- Modinomics
- Modi doctrine

== Others ==
- Howdy Modi
- NaMo Kabaddi
- Narendra Modi Panchayati Raj Evam Gramin Vikas Sansthan, Gandhinagar

== See also ==
- List of awards and honours received by Narendra Modi
- List of things named after prime ministers of India
