= Namo =

Namo, Na Mo, or variants, may refer to:

== People and characters ==
=== Persons ===
- Narendra Modi (born 1950), occasionally shortened to NaMo, Indian politician and the current Prime Minister of India
- Namo Hermios (died 1981), a Marshallese chief and politician
- Namo Narayana, Indian actor
- Namo Narain Meena (born 1943), former Minister of State for Finance in Government of India
- Namo Tongkumnerd (born 1987), Thai actor
- Namo, Japanese mangaka who illustrated Baka and Test
- Lilla Namo (born 1988, as Namo Marouf), Swedish singer
- Sylvester Namo (born 2000), a Papua New Guinean professional rugby league footballer
- Victor Namo (born 1988), a Nigerian soccer player
- Frida Nåmo Rønning (born 1997), a Norwegian handball player

=== Fictional characters ===
- Námo, a character from J. R. R. Tolkien's Middle-earth
- Duke Namo, a character from the medieval legends of Charlemagne
- Nyamo Namo, a fictional character from Love Hina, a South Seas indigenous islander

== Places ==
- Namo Falls, waterfalls in Guam
- Namo River, a river in Guam
- Na Mo District, a district in Laos
- Namu Atoll (Marshallese: Naṃo), Ralik Chain, Marshall Islands
- NaMo Grand Central Park, Thane, India
- Nam Ô, Vietnam; a village involved in the Tet offensive attacks on Da Nang

== Film ==
- Namo (film), a 2024 Indian Telugu-language film by Aditya Reddy Kunduru
- Namo Venkatesa, a 2010 Indian Telugu-language film by Srinu Vaitla

== Groups, organizations ==
- Namo Media, a technology company that provides in-stream advertisements for mobile applications
- NAMO Medical Education and Research Institute, Silvassa, Dadra and Nagar Haveli and Daman and Diu, India; a government medical college
- Namo Elementary School, Namu Atoll; see Marshall Islands Public School System
- Namo Taoism (Chinese: 南無派, romanized: Námó pài), one of the Daoist schools, a branch of Taoist philosophy
- Namassej or Namo, a community of Bengal

== Other uses ==
- Namo language, a Papuan language in the Nambu dialect cluster of Papua New Guinea
- Namo Bharat, Indian trainset

== See also ==
- Namas (disambiguation)
- Namos (disambiguation)
- Namo amitabha, a Mahāyāna Buddhist text in the Pure Land Buddhist schools
- Namo, Namo, Matha, former first line of the national anthem of Sri Lanka
- Nammo, a Norwegian-Finnish aerospace and defence company
