= Nama =

Nama or NAMA may refer to:

== Biology ==
- NAMA (gene), a long non-coding RNA gene
- Nama (plant), a genus of plants in the family Boraginaceae
- N-Acetylmuramic acid, a component of bacterial cell walls
- North American Mycological Association, a learned society devoted to mushrooms and other fungi

== Companies ==
- Nama Chemicals, a Saudi Arabian industrial company
- Nama (department store), a chain of department stores in Slovenia and a chain of department stores in Croatia

== Food ==
- Nama bīru, Japanese term for draught beer
- Nama (wine), used by the Greek Orthodox in the Divine Liturgy

== Geology ==
- Nama Group, group of stratigraphic sequences in Namibia
- Nama assemblage, final Ediacaran biotic assemblage

== Politics ==
- National Asset Management Agency, Irish government agency dealing with land and property development loans
- Nationally Appropriate Mitigation Action, policies regarding greenhouse gas emissions
- Non-Agricultural Market Access, the question of non-agricultural market access as debated in the WTO trade negotiations

== Organizations ==
- National Agri-Marketing Association, United States
- National Movement of Amhara, a right-wing Amhara ethnic nationalist political party created in June 2018
- National Archaeological Museum, Athens
- National Automatic Merchandising Association, an American trade association for vending industries
- Swedish National Academy of Mime and Acting

== Places ==
- Nama, Burkina Faso, village in the Tenkodogo Department, Boulgou Province
- Nama (Chile), an archaeological site featuring pucará (ruined Inca fortifications)
- Nama (crater), a crater on Callisto, a moon of Jupiter
- Nama, India, a village at the foot of the Nama Pass
- Nama (island), an island of the State of Chuuk in the Federated States of Micronesia
- Nama, Nanning (那马镇), town in Liangqing District, Nanning, Guangxi, China
- Mingjian, the name of which was changed to Nama during Japanese rule

== Peoples and languages ==
- Nama people of Namibia and Namaqualand in South Africa
- Nama language, the language spoken by the Nama
- Nama language (Papuan), one of the Nambu languages of Papua New Guinea
- Nama, a variety of the Tigon language of Cameroon

== Other uses ==
- Nāma, Pali and Sanskrit for "name"
- Nama (band), a Greek pop/jazz/new age music group
- Namibian Annual Music Awards
- Native American Music Awards
- National Arts Merit Awards, annual award presented by the National Arts Council of Zimbabwe

== See also ==
- Naam (disambiguation)
- Namah (disambiguation)
- Naama (disambiguation)
- Naamah (disambiguation)
- Namam (disambiguation), the identification mark of South Indian Vaishnavites
- Namas (disambiguation)
- Naaman (disambiguation)
