= Namos =

Namos may refer to:

- Namos S. Hatiririe, an alias of Red Thunder Cloud (1919–1996), American entertainer
- Namos, an Oxford horse, a racehorse, winner of the 2019 and 2020 Silberne Peitsche
- National Art Museum of Sport (NAMOS), Indianapolis, Indiana, USA

== See also ==
- Namo (disambiguation), for the singular of Namos, NAMOs
- Namsos (disambiguation)
- Namas (disambiguation)
