= Nam =

Nam, 'Nam, or The Nam are shortened terms for:

- Vietnam, which is also spelled Viet Nam
- The Vietnam War

Nam, The Nam or NAM may also refer to:

== Arts and media ==
- Nam, a fictional character in anime series Dragon Ball
- NAM (1986 video game), a 1986 computer war game for 8-bit computers
- NAM (video game), a 1998 PC game
- The 'Nam, a Vietnam War comic series by Marvel

== Organizations and movements ==
- NAM Aidsmap, a UK organization and website formerly named the National AIDS Manual and now often simply aidsmap
- National Academy of Medicine, of the US National Academies of Sciences
- National-Anarchist Movement, a radical, racist, anti-capitalist, anti-Marxist, and anti-statist ideology
- National Anti-crisis Management, a shadow government created in Belarus in October 2020
- National Army Museum, a national museum of the British Army in London, England
- National Association of Manufacturers, an industrial trade association and advocacy group in the US
- National Association of Mathematicians, an association for mathematicians in the US
- Nederlandse Aardolie Maatschappij, a Dutch oil and gas company, owned by Shell and ExxonMobil
- New Age movement, a mid-20th century Western spiritual movement
- New American Movement, a former New Left socialist and feminist political organization in the US
- Non-Aligned Movement, of states not aligned with a major bloc during the Cold War

== Science and technology ==
- N-Acetylmescaline, an alkaloid and minor metabolite of the psychedelic drug mescaline
- N-Acetylmuramic acid, component of bacterial cell walls
- Negative electrode Active Material, surface layer of the negative electrode of a rechargeable battery
- Negative allosteric modulator, a type of allosteric modulator
- Nested association mapping, in statistical genetics
- Nicotinamide, a form of vitamin B3 found in food and used as a dietary supplement
- Non-Animal Methods or New Approach Methodologies (called NAMs), biomedical research models that use human data and do not use nonhuman animals as research models; includes in vivo and in silico
- North American Mesoscale Model, a short-term weather forecasting model
- Northern Annular Mode, a climate pattern
- Number Assignment Module, where phone number etc. is stored
- Network Access Module, a wall connection outlet with Ethernet network plugs

== People ==
=== Given name ===
- Nam Kiwanuka (born 1975), Canadian television personality
- Nam Le (poker player) (born 1980), Vietnamese-American professional poker player
- Nam Yimyaem, retired judge of Thailand

=== Surname ===
- Nam (Korean surname)

== Places ==
- Namibia, country code
- Nam River (disambiguation)
- North America (N.Am.)

== Other uses ==
- Nam Nam Alley, a lager-style beer brewed in Vietnam and sold in Australia
- Nam language, an extinct language preserved in Tibetan manuscripts
- Navy and Marine Corps Achievement Medal, US
- Network Addon Mod, for the game SimCity 4

== See also ==
- Vietnam (disambiguation)
- Naam (disambiguation)
- NAMS (disambiguation)
- Badnam (disambiguation)
