= Namah =

Namah (Persian for "reflection on" or Sanskrit for "salution to" ) may refer to:

- Faramarz Namah, a Persian epic recounting the adventures of the hero Faramarz
- Sindbad Namah, a Persian epic recounting the adventures of the hero Sindbad
- Shah Namah, a Persian epic recounting the adventures of the King
- Namah (TV series), 2019 Indian television series
- Namah (Peter Machajdík album), 2008
- Namah (Thaikkudam Bridge album), 2019
- "Namah", a song by David S. Ware from Shakti (2008)

== See also ==
- Nama (disambiguation)
- Naama (disambiguation)
- Naamah (disambiguation)
- Om Namah Shivaya (disambiguation)
