= Namas =

Namas may refer to:

== People ==
- Nama people, the Namas, an African ethnic group of South Africa, Namibia and Botswana
- Namas (rishi), a Hindu rishi (sage)
- Namas Chandra (born 1952), Indian-American engineering professor

== Places ==
- Nămaş, a village in Bistra Commune, Alba County, Romania
- Al-Namas, a governorate in 'Asir Province, Saudi Arabia
- Namas Creek, Manitoba, Canada; a tributary of the Hayes River

== Other uses ==
- Namaste, a customary greeting from the Sanskrit for "bow, obesiance"
- Keshava Namas, 24 names of Bhagavan in Hinduism
- The former National Measurement Accreditation Service, formed in 1985, which in 1995 became the United Kingdom Accreditation Service, when it merged with the National Accreditation Council for Certification Bodies
- National Academy of Media Arts & Sciences, a division of the National Academy of Television Arts and Sciences
- Namibian Annual Music Awards (NAMAs) awards show presenting the individual NAMA
- Native American Music Awards (NAMAs) awards show presenting the individual NAMA

== See also ==
- Nama (disambiguation)
- Namo (disambiguation)
- Namos (disambiguation)
