= Miki Nagasawa =

Japanese voice actress (born 1970)

- 長沢 美樹
- Born: July 11, 1970 (age 56); Obihiro, Hokkaido, Japan
- Occupation: Voice actress
- Years active: 1994–present
- Agent: Atomic Monkey

Miki Nagasawa (長沢 美樹, Nagasawa Miki; born July 11, 1970) is a Japanese voice actress. She was raised in Fukushima. Formerly affiliated for Haikyo, she is affiliated with Atomic Monkey. On anime roles, she voiced the eponymous character in Vampire Princess Miyu, Wedy in Death Note and Maya Ibuki in Neon Genesis Evangelion. In video games, she voiced Shelinda in Final Fantasy X and X-2, Kuyo in Genji: Dawn of the Samurai, Karin in Shadow Hearts 2, and Sleigh Presty in Super Robot Wars. Nagasawa attended Nan Desu Kan in 2009.

== Filmography ==
=== Animation ===
1994

- Key the Metal Idol (OVA) – Sakura Kuriyagawa
- Macross 7 – Jessica

1995

- Neon Genesis Evangelion – Maya Ibuki

1996

- After War Gundam X – Pala Sys
- Brave Command Dagwon – Maria Tobe, Gunkid
- Martian Successor Nadesico – Izumi Maki

1997

- Vampire Princess Miyu (TV series) – Miyu

1998

- Anpanman – Creampanda
- Blue Submarine No. 6 – Mutio
- Cowboy Bebop – Judy
- Cyber Team in Akihabara – Kamome Sengakuji
- Getter Robo Armageddon (OVA) – Michiru Saotome
- Princess Nine – Ryo Hayakawa

2000

- Boys Be – Yumi Kazama
- The Candidate for Goddess – Kizna Towryk
- éX-Driver – Lisa Sakakino
- Gate Keepers – Keiko Ochiai

2001

- Captain Tsubasa: Road to 2002 – Manabu Okawa
- Case Closed – Yoko Okino (episode 249 – present)
- Fruits Basket - Kyo's Mother
- Love Hina – Tsuruko Aoyama (Bonus episode: "Motoko's Choice, Love or the Sword: Don't Cry")

2004

- Kyo Kara Maoh! – Lyra
- Mobile Suit Gundam MS IGLOO (OVA series) – Monique Cadillac

2005

- Onegai My Melody – Patricia
- Naruto – Toki

2006

- Death Note – Wedy
- Koi suru Tenshi Angelique – Rachel

2007

- Claymore series – Helen

2010

- Super Robot Wars Original Generation: The Inspector – Sleigh Presty

2011

- Mobile Suit Gundam AGE – Lalaparly Madorna

2012

- Hunter × Hunter (Second Series) (Baise, Coco Loo)

2013

- Magi: The Kingdom of Magic – Leraje

2014

- One Piece – Wicca

2024

- Chi's Sweet Summer Vacation (ONA) – Grandmother

=== Video games ===
Pre-2023

- Angelique – Rachel
- Final Fantasy X – Shelinda
- Final Fantasy X-2 – Shelinda
- Fushigi Yūgi Genbu Kaiden Gaiden: Kagami no Miko – Uruki
- Mobile Suit Gundam Side Story: The Blue Destiny – Maureen Kitamura
- Atelier Elie ~The Alchemist of Salburg 2~ – Elfile
- True Love Story 2 – Sawada
- Blood: The Last Vampire – Ruria
- Super Robot Wars – Sleigh Presty
- Tales of Vesperia – Sodia, Droite
- Tales of Fandom – Primula Rosso
- Capcom vs. SNK 2 – Cammy and Maki
- Genji: Dawn of the Samurai – Kuyo
- Genji: Days of the Blade – Kuyo
- Shadow Hearts 2 – Karin Koenig
- JoJo's Bizarre Adventure: Heritage for the Future – Mannish Boy, Midler, Mariah and Death 13

2023

- Honkai: Star Rail - Pom-Pom

=== Dubbing ===
- Cowboy Bebop (Judy (Lucy Currey))

== Discography ==
=== Drama CDs ===
- Century Prime Minister (vol. 1–3) – Miki Nagashima
- Skip Beat! – Kyōko Mogami
- Fushigi Yugi Genbu Kaiden as Uruki (female form)
- Saredotsumibitoharyūtoodoru – Saredo Shivunya
- Hayate X Blade – Miyamoto Shizuku
- Fruits Basket – Momiji Sohma
- Hogen Renai Vol.5 – "Kanagawa Prefecture", "Fukushima" – Hyakuhana Atsumi
- Anime tenchō series – Ramika Hoshi
