= List of Love Hina episodes =

Cover of the "Anime Legends" boxset

Love Hina (ラブ ひな, Rabu Hina) is a Japanese manga series written and illustrated by Ken Akamatsu. It was adapted into a 24 episode anime series by Xebec, which aired in Japan on TV Tokyo from April 19, 2000, to September 27, 2000. The opening theme was Sakura Saku (サクラサク) and the closing theme was Kimi Sae Ireba (君さえいれば). Both songs were written by Ritsuko Okazaki and performed by Megumi Hayashibara. The two themes were released as a CD single, which debuted on the Oricon charts at Number 7. A 25th episode was later created and released as a DVD bonus. The series and bonus episode were directed by Yoshiaki Iwasaki, written by Shō Aikawa and featured character designs by Makoto Uno. After the series finished, Christmas and Spring specials followed, and finally a three-part original video animation (OVA) series called Love Hina Again. The series follows the daily life of Keitaro Urashima, the manager of an all-girls dorm, as he attempts to pass the Tokyo University entrance exams and to find the girl he promised to enter Tokyo U with when he was a child.

In Japan, the series was released on nine DVDs by Starchild Records between August 3, 2000, and April 2, 2001. Several volumes were also released with a bundled character figure for an additional price. The Christmas special was released on July 4, 2001, and the spring special was released on August 1, 2001. Love Hina Again was released as 3 separate DVDs between January 26, 2002, and March 27, 2002. A complete box set containing the entire TV series, the two specials, and the OVA series was released on July 6, 2005.

The series was originally licensed in North America by Bandai and released across six DVDs from February 19, 2002, to November 19, 2002. The Christmas special was released on December 3, 2002, and followed by the Spring special on March 18, 2003. Love Hina Again was released on September 2, 2003. A box set containing the Christmas and Spring specials and Love Hina Again was released as "Love Hina Movie Set" on September 4, 2002. A complete box set of the television series, Christmas Special, Spring Special and Love Hina Again was released on September 28, 2004, as "Love Hina - Perfect Collection". A complete box set of the television series was released on June 27, 2006, as "Love Hina Anime Legends Complete Collection". In July 2007, Funimation Entertainment announced they had acquired the license to Love Hina after Bandai's license had expired, and a box set of the series over 4 discs was released on February 24, 2009.

In the United Kingdom, Love Hina is licensed by MVM Films, who released the series on six DVDs between September 6, 2004, and March 7, 2004. A box set was released on May 14, 2007. The Christmas and Spring specials were released out of order, with the Spring special released on May 16, 2005, and the Christmas special on November 7, 2005. Love Hina Again was released on January 8, 2008. A box set containing the Christmas and Spring specials and Love Hina Again was released as "Love Hina - Specials Collection" on September 4, 2002.

Love Hina is also licensed in Australia and New Zealand by Madman Entertainment, who released the series across six DVDs between September 18, 2002, and February 11, 2003. A box set was released on December 3, 2003. A box set containing the specials and Love Hina Again was released on March 14, 2007.

== Episodes ==
| No. | Title | Original release date |
|---|---|---|
| 1 | "All-girls Dorm with Outdoor Bath: Hot Springs"; Transliteration: "Rotenburo tsuki no Joshiryō: Onsen na" (Japanese: 露天風呂つきの女子寮 温泉な) | April 19, 2000 |
15 years ago, Keitaro Urashima made a promise to a girl, whose face and name he can't remember, that they would go to Tokyo U together. Now he is trying to fulfill that promise more than ever. One day he goes to visit his Grandma Hina and ends up running the Hinata Apartments where all the residents are over-the-top girls.
| 2 | "The Hinata's New Resident, Shinobu: Arrow Signs"; Transliteration: "Hinata sō no Shinjūnin Shinobu Yajirushi na" (Japanese: ひなた荘の新住人しのぶ 矢印な) | April 26, 2000 |
Shinobu Maehara is a girl going through troubling times. Her parents are going through a divorce, she has no friends and is moving away from Hinata. She has a chance encounter with Keitaro and ends up with his sketchbook which has drawings of her in it, smiling. After knowing what Shinobu was going through, Keitaro invites her to the apartment for a special going away party. When Shinobu's parents arrive at the apartment, Keitaro and the others hide her. After a brief talk on the roof where Keitaro appreciated Shinobu's cooking, she decided to tell her parents that she is going to stay at the apartment. Shinobu's parents reluctantly let her live at the Hinata Apartments, where Shinobu becomes the cook.
| 3 | "Kendo Girl in Love?: Swordplay"; Transliteration: "Koi suru!? Kendō musume Kengeki na" (Japanese: 恋する!?ケンドー娘 剣劇な) | May 3, 2000 |
Keitaro's first encounter with Motoko Aoyama when his friends were trying to flirt with Motoko and her comrades. She then attacks them. When Keitaro returns to the Hinata Apartments he finds Motoko in the laundry room and is shocked to find a man in charge. She tries to attack Keitaro with her wooden sword numerous times, yet eventually comes to more or less accepting him as the manager after being convinced by the other residents to accept him.
| 4 | "The Tokyo U Promise from 15 Years Ago: Diary"; Transliteration: "Tōdai no yakusoku wa jūgonen mae Nikki na" (Japanese: 東大の約束は15年前 日記な) | May 10, 2000 |
After finding out that Keitaro was actually a prep school student and not a Tokyo U student, the other resident were disappointed that he lied to them. Even so, they still let Keitaro stay as manager as long as he does work around the apartment. When Keitaro sneaks a peak at Naru's diary and finds out about a promise that apparently she made many years ago to go to Tokyo U, he starts to think that Naru could be his promise girl. However when Naru walks in and saw Keitaro was reading her diary, she became disappointed and starts giving him the cold shoulders. As it turns out, the promise was supposed to be to a man named Seta, even though Keitaro still doesn't know it yet. So Keitaro tries to make it up to Naru by impressing her on their latest prep school exam. While grading his own exam, Keitaro sees that he got the first 3 questions wrong and thinking that he failed, he ran away from the apartment.
| 5 | "Wow. A Trip to Kyoto! Exciting"; Transliteration: "Kyūsekkin! Kyōto futari tabi Dokidoki harahara na" (Japanese: 急接近!京都二人旅 ドキドキハラハラな) | May 17, 2000 |
After Keitaro and Naru were embarrassed about failing the entrance exams, Keitaro for the third time and Naru for the first time, they both decided to go their separate ways and go on a short vacation to Kyoto. They are oblivious to the fact that they are sharing the same seat on the train due to the fact that both their glasses are broken. They spend a day together and both think they have found an ideal match. Then they were forced into sharing a hotel room and they finally get their glasses back and realize that they spent the day with each other. After a brief disagreement, Naru and Keitaro both made up and decide to go sight seeing together.
| 6 | "Keitaro's First Kiss is with...? Journey"; Transliteration: "Keitarō, hatsu kisu? No aite Tabiji na" (Japanese: 景太郎、初キス?の相手 旅路な) | May 24, 2000 |
When the residents of the Hinata Apartments saw Keitaro on TV, they decide to mount a rescue mission. But they get completely sidetrack because nobody seems to know where they are. Meanwhile, Keitaro and Naru continue their shared holiday, much to Naru's disgust. They meet up with Mutsumi Otohime, the girl Keitaro ran into at their second exam, who is having difficulty in getting home to Okinawa. Keitaro offers to accompany Mutsumi, and Naru eventually tags along, but because of Mutsumi's bad sense of direction, they end up in several other Japanese cities that aren't Okinawa. Along the way they just miss the rest of the girls, whose efforts to find Keitaro and Naru lead them to unusual experiences.
| 7 | "First Date. Keitaro's True Feelings: Nowadays"; Transliteration: "Hatsu dēto, Keitarō no shitagokoro Imadokina" (Japanese: 初デート、景太郎のしたごころ いまどきな) | May 31, 2000 |
Su has created a new device, Virtual-Kun, which allows you to see what a person desires in their heart. When used on Keitaro, it reveals his affection for Naru, and his intention to take her on a date to a newly-opened amusement park. But when one of Naru's classmates, the calculating Kentaro, offers her the same deal, the two men end up in a competition for her affection.
| 8 | "Kendo Girl and the Legend of the Dragon Palace: Is This A Dream"; Transliteration: "Kendō musume no Ryūgū Densetsu: Yumeka na" (Japanese: ケンドー娘の竜宮伝説 夢かな) | June 7, 2000 |
Keitaro has obtained an old video game, 'Legend of the Dragon Palace'. At first Motoko is eager to dismiss it, but soon she and the Hinata girls get roped into the plot in a dream.
| 9 | "The Case of the Missing Hinata Apartment Money: A Mystery"; Transliteration: "Hinata sō Misshitsu genkin gōdatsu jiken Misuteri na" (Japanese: ひなた荘密室現金強奪事件 ミステリな) | June 14, 2000 |
The monthly rent is due in Hinata House, but since Keitaro is too sleepy to pay attention, the money disappears. It falls to Kitsune and Su, the only ones with a steadfast alibi, to discover who the thief is.
| 10 | "Who is the Beautiful Women Wandering in the Moonlight? Transformation"; Transliteration: "Tsukiyo ni Samayou Bijo no Shōtai wa? Henshin na" (Japanese: 月夜にさまよう美女の正体は? 変身な) | June 21, 2000 |
While trying to win Naru's favor (once again), Kentaro is ambushed by a girl who looks like an older version of Su. Keitaro and Naru struggle to prove Su's innocence, especially with every other male pointing the finger.
| 11 | "The Idol Shooting for Tokyo U is a Prep School Student: Sing"; Transliteration: "Mezase Tōdaisei Aidoru wa Yobikōsei Utau na" (Japanese: 目指せ東大生アイドルは予備校生 歌うな) | June 28, 2000 |
Naru wins a singing contest in Hinata, propelling her into singing stardom. But with a new career ahead of her, can she come back to her studies and aim once again for Tokyo U?
| 12 | "Changing After the Wedding? Swordmaster Motoko's Sunday Best: Feminine"; Transliteration: "Oironaoshi? Kengō Motoko no Haregisugata Onna no ko na" (Japanese: お色直し?剣豪モトコの晴れ着姿 女の子な) | July 5, 2000 |
Motoko has a secret fear: turtles. So when Naru's pet Tama-chan falls in with the laundry, Motoko finds herself asking everyone for clothes, even Keitaro! The only problem is, without her own clothes, she cannot summon her ki, and therefore has no skill with the sword. And when Su's robotic Tama-chan comes crashing towards Hinata House, the residents definitely need a swordswoman.
| 13 | "The First Kiss Tastes Like Lemon? Marshmallow? Grown-up"; Transliteration: "Hatsu kisu no aji wa remon? Mashumaro? Otona" (Japanese: 初キスの味はレモン?マシュマロ? おとな) | July 12, 2000 |
After spying on one of Keitaro's failed attempts to kiss Naru, Shinobu ends up worrying who her first kiss will be with. Her mind says Keitaro, but with Su added into the equation, who knows who it will be?
| 14 | "Naru's Crush Is Now a Tokyo U Professor: Turning Into Love?"; Transliteration: "Saikai? Naru akogare no hito wa ima Tōdai Kōshi Rabu he na" (Japanese: 再会?なる憧れの人は今東大講師 ラブへな) | July 19, 2000 |
There is a financial crisis at Hinata House: if the residents don't come up with 67,000 yen in three days, the utility companies will cut off all services. Keitaro ends up working for one of Tokyo U's scientists, not to mention his hyperactive daughter, but doesn't know about the old connection between this man and Naru.
| 15 | "I Love You!? Romantic Confession Inside a Cave: Tall Tale"; Transliteration: "Suki! Dōkutsu no naka no Rabu Rabu Sengen Horaana" (Japanese: 好き!洞くつの中のラブラブ宣言 ほらあな) | July 26, 2000 |
Keitaro is forced to look after Seta's adoptive daughter Sarah while the archaeologist is on a dig. A series of events leads them to the darker part of Hinata House, where everyone makes a startling discovery.
| 16 | "Monkey Performance at the Seaside Teahouse Hinata: A Kiss?"; Transliteration: "Umi no Ie, Hamachaya Hinata no Saru Shibai Chū ka na" (Japanese: 海の家·浜茶家ひなたのサル芝居 チュウかな) | August 2, 2000 |
Haruka is opening a tea house by the beach over the summer, and the residents have to put on a play to draw in customers. But when Su destroys the main building, Seta appears with an alternate venue. The price for this venue, however, is a change in the castings.
| 17 | "Mesmerized by Naru on the Haunted Island! Something's Fishy!"; Transliteration: "Umi... Naru ni Doki!! Yōkai ni Kura Ayashii na" (Japanese: 海...なるにドキッ!妖怪にクラッ 妖しいな) | August 9, 2000 |
Shirai and Haitani offer to help Keitaro earn Naru's heart, with a scary boat ride that drives her into his arms. Their plans are dashed, however, when a real ghost seizes Naru, and Motoko has to fight on her behalf.
| 18 | "Girls Dressed in Yukata for the Summer Festival: Let's!"; Transliteration: "Sorezore no yukata no kimi to Natsumatsuri Hona" (Japanese: それぞれの浴衣のきみと夏祭り ほな) | August 16, 2000 |
Just before the residents go back from their summer break, they attend the Summer festival in the local town, dressed in traditional outfits. Kitsune, however, seems determined to force Naru and Seta away from one another for their own good. Could she have an ulterior motive?
| 19 | "Marry into Money? A Prince from Across the Sea: Warm"; Transliteration: "Tama no koshi? Umi no mukou no Kōtaishi Atataka na" (Japanese: 玉の輿?海のむこうの皇太子 暖かな) | August 23, 2000 |
A man who happens to look exactly like Keitaro when he wears glasses appears and is later found out to be from Kaolla's home country. He is here to marry Kaolla but she decides she isn't quite ready yet, but tradition says she must.
| 20 | "A Sepia-colored Promise with a Sleeping Girl: A Trick?"; Transliteration: "Nemuri no shōjo to Sepia iro no yakusoku Karakuri na" (Japanese: 眠りの少女とセピア色の約束 カラクリな) | August 30, 2000 |
Keitaro discovers a doll that can move on its own. Everyone is amazed by it but Keitaro and Mutsumi seem to be able to hear it talk also. Keitaro finds out from the doll that his great grandfather promised to fix its legs but never did and being the good guy he is, Keitaro decides to fulfill his ancestor's promise with the help of the girls, of course.
| 21 | "Jealous Outburst? Two Lovebirds on a Boat: Tremble"; Transliteration: "Shitto Bakuhatsu!? Bōto ueno oatsui futari Wanawana" (Japanese: 嫉妬爆発!?ボート上のお熱い二人 わなわな) | September 6, 2000 |
Naru and Keitaro decide to go out to celebrate the latest grades and while both are wondering whether it's a date or not, a mysterious little girl appears.Mutsumi also states that she is trying for Tokyo U because of a promise she made while she was still a little girl, but can't remember the name or face of the boy, hinting to the fact that she might be the girl that Keitaro made the promise to.
| 22 | "Little Sister Mei's Devious Plan: It Can't Be!"; Transliteration: "Imōto Mei no takurami, Misshitsu Daisakusen Sonna" (Japanese: 妹メイのたくらみ、密室大作戦 そんな) | September 13, 2000 |
Mei is Naru's stepsister and hopes to take Naru back home. To accomplish this, she decides she has to hook Keitaro up with Mutsumi and it is in this episode that Naru finds out something shocking.
| 23 | "Naru Narusegawa - Her Wavering Heart and Keitaro: Crushed"; Transliteration: "Narusegawa Naru, Yureru onnagokoro to Keitarō Konagona" (Japanese: 成瀬川なる、揺れる女心と景太郎 こなごな) | September 20, 2000 |
Naru now wonders what she should do with her newfound knowledge and it seems like Keitaro is going to be returning home since his grandma has returned to reclaim the inn. To add more to the mess, it doesn't look like Keitaro's studies are going to be enough to help him into Tokyo University.
| 24 | "Celebrate! Are the Blooming Flowers Tokyo U? Love? Everybody"; Transliteration: "Shuku! Sakura saku no wa Tōdai? Koi? Minna" (Japanese: 祝!サクラサクのは東大?恋? みんな) | September 27, 2000 |
Everyone has to leave Hinata House for a day because the inn is undergoing repairs and renovations. It also becomes apparent that Keitaro won't be coming back to Hinata Inn and Naru has completely given up on Keitaro. Who will Keitaro decide to be his soulmate, Naru or Mutsumi?
| 25 | "Motoko's Choice, Love or the Sword: Don't Cry"; Transliteration: "Motoko no Sentaku, Koi ka Ken... Naku na" (Japanese: 素子のセンタク、恋か剣... 泣くな) | September 27, 2000 |
Out of nowhere, Motoko's sister appears and is ready to pass on the dojo. However, Motoko is still not quite as strong as her sister and when her sister finds out about this, she gives Motoko an ultimatum: Motoko must beat her sister or marry Keitaro.

== TV specials ==
| No. | Title | Original release date |
|---|---|---|
| 1 | "Love Hina Christmas Special - Silent Eve"; Transliteration: "Rabu Hina Kurisumasu Supesharu ~ Sairento Ibu ~" (Japanese: ラブひな クリスマススペシャル〜サイレント·イヴ〜) | December 25, 2000 |
Keitaro, Naru, and the gang get caught up in the turmoil of the legendarily romantic night of Christmas Eve.
| 2 | "Love Hina Spring Special - I wish Your Dream"; Transliteration: "Rabu Hina Haru Supesharu ~ Kimi Sakurachiru nakare!! ~" (Japanese: ラブひな 春スペシャル 〜キミサクラチルナカレ!!〜) | April 1, 2001 |
Keitaro, convinced he's failed the Todai entrance exam yet again, ends up on a wild adventure in the south seas. And Naru is set out to look for him.

== OVAs ==
Love Hina Again

| No. | Title | Original release date |
|---|---|---|
| 1 | "Kanako"; Transliteration: "Kanako" (Japanese: 可奈子) | January 26, 2002 |
After deciding to take the semester off from Tokyo U, Keitaro goes to America with Seta to explore different archaeology sites. Kanako, Keitaro's step sister, comes to the Hinata apartments and appoints herself as the new landlord in Keitaro's absence, much to the annoyance of all the residents. Kanako makes many new rules, one which the residents try to break in order to find her weakness. What they didn't know was that it had to do with a certain promise Keitaro made with his "little sister." Although, Naru remembering her sister tries to help and defend Kanako, not knowing she plans to drive her out. At the end of the episode, Keitaro returns.
| 2 | "Keitaro"; Transliteration: "Keitarō" (Japanese: 景太郎) | February 28, 2002 |
After returning from overseas with Seta, Keitaro brings gifts for all the Hinata residents. After seeing Kanako, Keitaro thinks she's a new resident, but then recognizes her as the little girl who followed him. Kanako plans to get her and Keitaro alone, sending the dorm residents on "errands" that turn out to be fake. Tension rises a lot between Kanako and Naru. Keitaro asks Naru to meet him at the abandoned annex. Since the legend of the annex says if a couple stays there over night, they'll live happily ever after. Naru, once again trying to help Kanako and Keitaro sends Kanako to the annex, but regrets it after Haruka explained the legend, and how powerful its magic was. Of course Keitaro still doesn't remember he promised Kanako they'd go to the annex as children! In the dark he grabbed Kanako thinking she was Naru, and Kanako thinking he really loved her. When Keitaro realizes its Kanako, Naru arrives. It was too late! The magic forms a field around Kanako and Keitaro. Kanako still thinking Keitaro loves her says the ring he dropped was proof. Keitaro then says his gift for Naru. Naru tries to put the ring on, but it flies out of her hands.
| 3 | "Naru"; Transliteration: "Naru" (Japanese: なる) | March 27, 2002 |
Things are a little strange after Kanako, Keitaro, and Naru were in the annex. Both seem to have dreams with Moe as guide showing their true feelings and past promises. Naru still can't show her feelings for Keitaro, causing Shinobu, Matoko, and Kanako in particular much frustration. Kanako tries to find out both of their feelings using her usual method of disguise. To her disappointment, Naru seems too confused. Both of them are in love of course, however Naru's too afraid to face Shinobu and Motoko. Kanako tries to lure Keitaro again as Naru. Knowing its really her Keitaro goes after her to explain how he loved her as a kid sister. Keitaro's feelings goes against the abandoned annex's spell. He and his sister are brought to its top floor. Naru in an effort to find Keitaro's ring to confess and prove her love tries to go to the top floor clock. But she must go through her own friends, the residents of Hinata. As Naru makes her way up, Keitaro apologizes for forgetting his annex promise to Kanako, but explains how he'll love her as a sister. Naru retrieves the ring and finally confesses her love to Keitaro Urishima. Being one of his promise girls Moe helped Naru and Keitaro.

== See also ==
- List of Love Hina characters
- List of Love Hina chapters
