= Vietnam (disambiguation) =

Vietnam is a country at the eastern edge of mainland Southeast Asia.

Vietnam or Viet Nam may also refer to:

== Music ==
- VietNam (band), an American rock band from Brooklyn, New York
  - VietNam (album), 2007
- Vietnam (band), an American rock, post-punk and new wave band from Atlanta, Georgia
- Vietnam (Revolutionary Ensemble album), 1972
- Vietnam (Shockabilly album), 1984
- "Vietnam", a 1970 song by Jimmy Cliff

== Publication ==
- Vietnam: State, War, and Revolution (1945–1946), a 2013 book by David G. Marr
- Vietnam: A New History, a 2016 book by Christopher Goscha
- Vietnam: An Epic Tragedy, 1945–1975, a 2018 book by Max Hastings

== Other uses ==
- Vietnam (Kanso), a 1974 painting by Nabil Kanso
- Vietnam (miniseries), a 1987 Australian TV series
- Vietnam Airlines, a Vietnamese airline
- Air Vietnam, a former airline from South Vietnam

== See also ==
- Nam (disambiguation)
- Vietnamese people
- Vietnam War
- List of wars involving Vietnam
- History of Vietnam
- Names of Vietnam
