= Naam (disambiguation) =

Naam may refer to:

- Nāma, term for "name" in Sanskrit and Indic languages
  - Nāmakaraṇa, Hindu naming ceremony
- Naam (1953 film), a 1953 Indian film
- Naam (1986 film), a 1986 Indian Hindi-language film, starring Sanjay Dutt, Kumar Gaurav and Nutan
- Naam (2003 film), a 2003 Indian film
- Naam (2018 film), a 2018 Indian film
- Naam (2024 film), a 2024 Indian film
- "Naam", a 2020 single by Tulsi Kumar and Millind Gaba
- Northwest African American Museum in Seattle, Washington, USA
- NAAM (alliance), an alliance in Illyriad which stands for Non-Aligned-Alliance-Movement.
- NAAm, the synthetic auxin 1-Naphthaleneacetamide

== See also ==
- Nama (disambiguation)
- Namam (disambiguation)
- Naamah (disambiguation)
- Badnam (disambiguation)
