= Badnam (disambiguation) =

Badnam is a 1990 Indian Bengali-language drama film.

Badnam or Badnaam may also refer to:

- Badnaam (film), a 1966 Pakistani film
- Badnaam (band) from Pakistan
- Badnaam (TV series), a 2017 Pakistani drama serial
- Badnami, 1946 Indian film

== See also ==
- Nam (disambiguation)
- Naam (disambiguation)
- Badnam Basti, Hindi-language gay novel by Indian writer Kamleshwar
  - Badnam Basti, a 1971 Indian Hindi-language drama film by Prem Kapoor based on the novel
- Badnam Farishte, a 1971 Indian Hindi-language courtroom drama film, starring Rajesh Khanna and Sharmila Tagore
- Badnaam Gali, 2019 Indian Hindi-language web film by Ashwin Shetty
