= Nam River =

Nam River may refer to:

- Nam River (Burma), a river in Burma
- Nam River (South Korea), a tributary of the Nakdong
- Nam River (North Korea), a tributary of the Taedong

== Other ==
- Nam Hinboun River
- Nam Pang River
- Nam Song River
- Nam Xan River

== See also ==
- Nam (disambiguation)
