= NAMS =

NAMS may refer to:

- National Academy of Medical Sciences, a non-constitutional, non-statutory advisory body to the government of India
- National Academy of Medical Sciences, Nepal, based in Bir Hospital, Mahaboudha, Kathmandu, Nepal
- New Asia Middle School, a secondary school in Hong Kong
- Nuclear Accident Magnitude Scale, an alternative to the International Nuclear and Radiological Event Scale
- The Menopause Society, a nonprofit, organization promoting the health and quality of life of women during midlife and beyond

== See also ==
- Nam (disambiguation)
