= Namam =

Namam may refer to:

- Sricharanam, identification mark of Sri Vaishnavites and Iyengars
- Thirunamam, identification mark used by Ayyavali

== See also ==
- Naam (disambiguation)
- Nama (disambiguation)
