= List of Love Hina chapters =

First tankōbon volume cover, released by Kodansha on March 17, 1999

Love Hina is a manga series written and illustrated by Ken Akamatsu. The series was originally serialized in Weekly Shōnen Magazine from 1998 to 2001, running weekly for 118 chapters. The individual chapters were collected and published in 14 tankōbon volumes by Kodansha, with the first volume released on March 17, 1999, and the last released on January 17, 2002. The manga was also later released in Japan in a partially colored format known as "Iro Hina version" (literally "Color Hina version") at an increased price. In November 2010, all 14 volumes of Love Hina were offered for free in the beta test of Ken Akamatsu's J-Comi website. Kodansha has also published a bilingual (English and Japanese) edition under its Kodansha Bilingual Comics label, with the English translation provided by Giles Murray. Eight volumes were produced under the bilingual format. Kodansha stopped publishing the bilingual version in 2001.

The series is licensed for an English language release in North America and the United Kingdom by Tokyopop, which released the 14 volumes between May 7, 2002 and September 16, 2003. The English release was one of Tokyopop's first releases in the "Authentic Manga" lineup of titles using the Japanese right to left reading style. In doing so the artwork remained unchanged from the original. The series has appeared consistently in Tokyopop's top five selling manga and has been reprinted several times. In August 2009, it was revealed that Tokyopop's license had been left to expire by Kodansha and would not be renewed. Kodansha USA, Kodansha's American division re-released the manga in a five-volume omnibus format with a new translation from October 25, 2011, to March 26, 2013.

== Volumes ==
No.	Original release date	Original ISBN	English release date	English ISBN
01	March 17, 1999	978-4-06-312670-9	May 21, 2002	978-1-931514-94-1
001. "Welcome to Hinata House" (ようこそ! ひなた荘へ, "Yōkoso! Hinatasō e"); 002. "Landlord of a Girls Dorm?" (就任! 女子寮管理人?, "Shūnin! Joshiryō Kanrinin?"); 003. "Prep School Surprise" (予備校でドッキリ!?, "Yobikō de Dokkiri!?"); 004. "Kotatsu Complications" (コタツな関係, "Kotatsu de Kankei"); 005. "Don't Cry, Shinobu" (泣かないで, しのぶちゃん!, "Nakanaide, Shinobu-chan!"); 006. "Kendo Challenge" (勝負! カンドー一直線, "Shōbu! Kendō Itchokusen"); Early Character Designs
Keitaro Urashima is a second year ronin who has been kicked out from home by his parents for failing to enter Tokyo University. He heads to Hinata House, an inn owned by his grandmother, in order to find a place to live and study for his exams. After a misunderstanding, Keitaro is shocked to find that Hinata House is now an all-girls dorm, and because of this he cannot stay there. As he prepares to leave, it is announced that Hinata House now belongs to Keitaro and he must become the landlord. Keitaro then learns that Naru Narusegawa, a resident of Hinata House, is ranked number one in the nation on the mock exams, and he convinces her to help him study. As he begins to study, Keitaro plans a birthday surprise for Shinobu Maehara and is challenged to a Kendo duel by Motoko Aoyama
02	April 16, 1999	978-4-06-312681-5	June 25, 2002	978-1-931514-97-2
007. "Come On, Let's Sleep Together! ♥" (いっしょに寝ヨ, "Issho ni Ne yo"); 008. "The Eve of Goodbye (Part 1)" (さよならの聖夜 (前編), "Sayonara no Seiya (Zenpen)"); 009. "The Eve of Goodbye (Part 2)" (さよならの聖夜 (後編), "Sayonara no Seiya (Kōhen)"); 010. "Lucky in the New Year" (初もうででラッキー, "Hatsumōde de Rakkī"); 011. "Run! Center Test" (はしれ! センター試験, "Hashire! Sentā Shiken"); 012. "Happy or Unhappy?"; 013. "In Dreams" (夢の中へ, "Yume no Naka e"); 014. "I Hate Valentine's Day!" (バレンタインなんて大きらい!, "Barentain Nante Daikirai!"); 015. "Together Forever" (ずっといっしょに, "Zutto Issho ni"); Love Hina Initial Reference Collection Part 2
Motoko Aoyama leaves Hinata House for a few days to go on a training trip. Feeling lonely without Motoko, Kaolla Su begins to follow Keitaro around the inn, and physically prevents him from studying. Keitaro is convinced he will do well on the Tokyo university mock exam due a small increase in his grades. He accidentally reads Naru's diary and becomes convinced Naru is the girl he made the promise with. After failing the mock exam and receiving a 0% chance of passing the Tokyo University exam, Keitaro attempts to run away from Hinata House out of shame. After being prevented from leaving by Naru, Keitaro receives a bad luck charm at a New years visit to a temple. However, he is able to pass a later exam at the prep school. After receiving chocolates from all the girls for Valentines Day, Keitaro and Naru finally sit the real exam for Tokyo University.
03	June 17, 1999	978-4-06-312705-8	July 23, 2002	978-1-59182-014-7
016. "Birth of the Tokyo University Couple!" (誕生! 東大生カップル?, "Tanjō! Tōdaisei Kappuru?"); 017. "Congratulations on Getting Into Tokyo U!" (東大合格オメデトウ!?, "Tōdai Gōkaku Omedetō!?"); 018. "A Journey of Sorrow and Youth" (哀と青春の旅立ち, "Ai to Seishun no Tabidachi"); 019. "Heart Flutterings and Mixed Bathings" (混浴でドッキリ, "Kon'yoku de Dokkiri"); 020. "A Virginal Night" (バージンな夜, "Bājin na Yoru"); 021. "Oh Me, Oh My! Otohime Appears!!" (あらまぁ, 乙姫登場!, "Ara Maa, Otohime Tōjō!"); 022. "Sorry For Being So Alike ♥" (似た者どーしでゴメン, "Nitamono Dōshi de Gomen"); 023. "Palpitations While Floating Away!" (流されちゃってドキドキ!, "Nagasarechatte Dokidoki!"); 024. "Everyone Get Together! The Little Match Girl Plan." (全員集合! マッチ売り作戦, "Zen'in Shūgō! Matchi Uri Sakusen")
After the first day of the Tokyo University exam, Keitaro feels he did well on the test. Keitaro and Naru find a park close to Hinata Inn that he used to play in as a child, and he becomes even more convinced Naru is the girl of his promise. The next morning Naru asks Keitaro about his promise as he keeps referring to it. She corrects his mistaken belief, as she was only two years old at the time, and she reveals she made her own promise with someone else two years ago. Keitaro goes into shock for the next two weeks until Naru forces him to go with her to check their test results. Keitaro discovers he has failed the exam, and chases after Naru who has run off after also failing the exam. The two have a heated argument, and both independently run off to Kyoto for a trip of self healing. The other residents of Hinata Inn travel to Kyoto to retrieve the pair. In Kyoto, Keitaro and Naru frequently run into each other and meet Mutsumi Otohime, a fellow Tokyo University hopeful. After escorting Mutsumi back to Okinawa, Keitaro and Naru finish settling their differences and are met by the other residents.
04	September 16, 1999	978-4-06-312739-3	August 20, 2002	978-1-59182-015-4
025. "When the Cherry Blossoms Bloom" (桜のさく頃, "Sakura no Saku Koro"); 026. "The Hinata House Runaway" (ひなた荘ランナウェイ, "Hinatasō Rannawei"); 027. "Kendo Girl's Tiny Little Problem" (剣道娘の小さな悩み, "Kendō Musume no Chiisana Nayami"); 028. "In the Downpour With You" (どしゃ降りの二人, "Doshaburi no Futari"); 029. "HELP! Working Part-Time is a Killer" (HELP! バイトはつらいよ, "Help! Baito wa Tsurai yo"); 030. "Battle! Print Club Man vs. Earthenware Girl" (決戦! プリクラ男VS土偶娘, "Kessen! Purikura Otoko vs. Dogū Musume"); 031. "Missing You at Hinata House" (すれちがって, ひなた荘, "Surechigatte, Hinatasō"); 032. "A Sudden Resume" (突然のresume, "Totsuzen no Resume"); 033. "I Love You, Senpai!" (好きです先輩!, "Suki desu Senpai!")
Everyone returns to Hinata Inn together, just in time for Naru's high school graduation. The annual Hinata Inn Cherry blossom festival is held as Naru comes to terms with no longer being a formal student. Motoko then loses a duel to Keitaro, and due to an agreement between the two, Motoko agrees to try being more feminine. Due to her insecurities, she challenges Keitaro to another duel, but upon winning does not deliver the agreed punishment. Instead, she decides that being unfeminine balances Keitaro's lack of masculinity. Keitaro gets a part time job, but is sacked when Mitsune causes a problem. To make up for it, she tells Keitaro about the promise Naru made two years ago. Keitaro then ultimately gets a job assisting Noriyasu Seta, a Tokyo university graduate and former crush of Naru's. After Keitaro begins looking after Sarah McDougal, Mitsune launches a plan to keep Seta and Naru apart, but they meet in the hot spring and Keitaro tells Seta how Naru feels about him.
05	November 17, 1999	978-4-06-312776-8	September 17, 2002	978-1-59182-016-1
034. "Let's Go To The Beach" (海へいこう!, "Umi e Ikō!"); 035. "Midsummer Night's Passion" (真夏の夜のパッション, "Manatsu no Yoru no Passhon"); 036. "He Became Fireworks" (花火になったアイツ, "Hanabi ni Natta Aitsu"); 037. "Lovely Goku And Friends ♥" (ラブリー悟空と愉快な仲間たち, "Raburī Gokū to Yukai na Nakamatachi"); 038. "Happening Chu ♥" (パプニングCHU, "Papuningu Chu"); 039. "Kiss Me Senpai ♥" (キスMeセンパイ, "Kisu Me Senpai"); 040. "Blooming Innocence's Retreat To A Mountain!?" (花咲く乙女の山ごもり!?, "Hanasaku Otome no Yamagomori!?"); 041. "Mysterious Girl's Secret" (不思議少女のヒミツ, "Fushigi Shōjo no Himitsu"); 042. "Somehow I Can't Become Honest..." (なんか素直になれなくて..., "Nanka Sunao ni Narenakute...")
The residents of Hinata Inn travel to the Beach to help Haruka run the Beach Cafe Hinata. Keitaro's friends Shirai and Haitani also arrive at the Beach and try to convince Keitaro that Naru is in love with him. While Keitaro and Naru are having a private chat, Shirai and Haitani throw drinks cans at Keitaro, hitting him in the head. This causes Keitaro to fall over Naru in a compromising position, leading her to believe he was trying to take advantage of her drunken state. Naru runs into Seta, and uses him to make Keitaro jealous when everyone attends a local festival. At the end of the night Keitaro tries to apologize to Naru, but she mishears him due to a fireworks display and believes he is trying to blame her. At Haruka's request, the residents of Hinata Inn, along with Seta, put on a play of Journey to the West to children. Due to Keitaro's inability to properly apologize to Naru, Shirai and Haitani apologize to her for their role in the misunderstanding between the two. As everyone prepares to leave the beach, Seta announces that he is leaving Sarah in the care of Hinata House. This causes Sarah to try and leave Naru and Keitaro on a deserted island, but her plan is foiled.
06	February 17, 2000	978-4-06-312805-5	October 22, 2002	978-1-59182-017-8
043. "Invite Me, Keitaro!" (誘って! 景太郎, "Sasotte! Keitarō"); 044. "The Happy, but Embarrassing, First Date ♥" (嬉しハズかし初デート, "Ureshi Hazukashi Hatsu Dēto"); 045. "The Sudden Goodbye..." (突然のサヨナラ, "Totsuzen no Sayonara"); 046. "Looking Through 3000 Villages for a Place to Stay?!" (下宿さがして三千里, "Geshuku Sagashite Sanzenri"); 047. "Made Public! Mutsumi's Study Methods ♥" (公開! むつみの勉強法, "Kōkai! Mutsumi no Benkyōhō"); 048. "Talk of True Feelings in the Nude ♥" (裸で本音トーク, "Hadaka de Honne Tōku"); 049. "The Disturbance, Liddo-kun!! ♥" (お騒がせ リッドくん!!, "Osawagase Riddo-kun!!"); 050. "The Destined Two ♥" (運命の2人, "Unmei no Futari"); 051. "A Holy Night with that Girl ♥" (あの子とHolly Night, "Ano Ko to Holly Night")
Keitaro gets two tickets from Shirai and Haitani for the opening event of a new amusement park, so he decides to ask Naru out on a date. However, things get complicated when the other residents at Hinata Inn start asking Keitaro to let them go with him. In the end, he ends up buying tickets for everyone to go. His plan fails, so he decides to ask Naru out again. This time things go pretty well for them and afterwards they seem to get closer more and more. One day, Tama-chan gets lost and while Keitaro and the girls are looking for him, they ran into Otohime Mutsumi again. They learn that she's also aiming for Tokyo U again, and that she's also living in a house right beside Hinata Inn. Since she's too clumsy to study by herself, Keitaro and Naru decide to form a study group with her. While autumn comes to an end, Naru discovers by looking at an old photo that Mutsumi knew Keitaro 15 years ago. She comes to the conclusion that Mutsumi is the girl Keitaro made the promise with, and on Christmas Eve she shows Keitaro the photo and tells him he and Mutsumi are destined to be together.
07	April 14, 2000	978-4-06-312827-7	November 12, 2002	978-1-59182-018-5
052. "A Little Lost Sheep on a Holy Night?!" (聖なる夜の迷える子羊!?, "Seinaru Yoru no Mayoeru Kohitsuji!?"); 053. "The Heart-Pounding ♥ Bad Luck Cleansing Scheme?!" (ドッキリ 厄払い大作戦!?, "Dokkiri Yakubarai Daisakusen!?"); 054. "Love Confession on Ice?!" (氷上の告白!?, "Hyōjō no Kokuhaku!?"); 055. "That Serious Guy is a Criminal?!" (まじめなアイツは罪つくり, "Majime na Aitsu wa Tsumi Tsukuri!?"); 056. "Palpitations on the Love Love Boat. ♥" (ラブラブボートでドキッ, "Raburabu Bōto de Doki"); 057. "Sweet Cho-co-late ♥" (スゥイート ち·よ·こ·れ·い·と, "Sūīto Chiyokoreito"); 058. "My Papa is a Ronin Stone?!" (パパは浪人生!?, "Papa wa Rōninsei!?"); 059. "Please Don't Say Those Words." (その言葉はいわないで, "Sono Kotoba wa Iwanaide"); 060. "A Happy End with You." (ハッピーエンドは君と., "Happī Endo wa Kimi to."); Ken Akamatsu x Yui Horie Love Love Talk! (Japan only)
Now that he knows Mutsumi was the girl he made the promise with 15 years ago, Keitaro isn't sure about whether or not he should be with her or with Naru. He then decides its too difficult to choose at the moment. Since exams are getting nearer, the three ronins start focusing on their studies more than before. After her house gets burned down, Mutsumi goes to live with Haruka on the 2nd floor of the tea house. In order to relax a bit from the study, Mutsumi asks Keitaro on a date. To add even more tension, Mutsumi starts to remember about the time she lived at Hinata Inn 15 years, and also about a promise she made with a certain someone. It is at this moment that Naru tells Keitaro he should be with Mutsumi. However, Keitaro tries to tell her that he's actually in love with her, but Naru kisses him before he could finish. She then says there's only ten days left (before the exam, that is), implying he should focus on studying. Then, on the first day of exams, Mutsumi states that the promise she made 15 years ago was with a girl. That night, Naru and Keitaro start wondering if Naru is actually the girl he made the promise with. The second day of exams, Keitaro starts daydreaming about the recent events and reacts 5 minutes before the end of the exam, thinking that there's no chance now that he can pass.
08	July 17, 2000	978-4-06-312863-5	January 7, 2003	978-1-59182-019-2
061. "Runaway to the Ends of the Earth" (最果てランナウェー, "Saihate Rannawei"); 062. "The Cherry Blossoms Are Blooming... Or Are They?" (サクラサク...カ?, "Sakura Saku... ka?"); 063. "Follow Me to Pararakelse Island" (追いかけてパララケルス, "Oikakete Pararakerusu"); 064. "Finding Paradise in Pararakelse" (パラダイスinパララケルス島, "Paradaisu in Pararakerusu Tō"); 065. "Go, Shinobu Go!" (しのぶ, いきます!, "Shinobu, Ikimasu!"); 066. "Cherry Blossoms Bloom in the Desert" (サバクニサクラサク, "Sabaku ni Sakura Saku"); 067. "I'd Like to Be Your Friend" (友達になりたい, "Tomodachi ni Naritai"); 068. "From Pararakelse With Love (Part 1)" (パララケルスより愛をこめて (前編), "Pararakerusu Yori Ai o Komete (Zenpen)"); 069. "From Pararakelse With Love (Part 2)" (パララケルスより愛をこめて (後編), "Pararakerusu Yori Ai o Komete (Kōhen)"); Pararakelse Adventure Character Designs (Japan Only)
Believing not to have passed the exam for the umpteenth time, Keitaro decides to give up forever on Naru and Tokyo University and steals on a ship to flee. By mistake, however, he ends on Pararakelse island, Hawaii, where he meets Professor Seta, who is being assisted in his excavations by a local young woman, Nyamo, which looks very much like Shinobu. Naru goes looking for him, even before knowing the results of the exam, and the other Hinata Inn girls discover that both ronins and Mutsumi have finally passed the exam, but have a few days to confirm the results, otherwise everything will be lost. On the island, Keitaro, Naru and Nyamo are lost in the desert during an expedition, but they find a kind of earthly paradise where they spend a good time together. In the end, the girls find them after many adventures, Keitaro is informed of the results of the examination and they all begin a desperate race to get home in time.
09	October 17, 2000	978-4-06-312892-5	March 11, 2003	978-1-59182-103-8
070. "Let's Go to Tokyo U!" (東大へ行こう!, "Tōdai e Ikō!"); 071. "Yes or No or ?" (○or×, それとも...?, "Iesu or Nō, Sore Tomo...?"); 072. "Burn Up Blade: Part 1 (Big Sister Comes to Tokyo!)" (萌えよ剣〜その1〜姉上上京!, "Moeyo Ken -Sono 1- Aneue Jōkyō!"); 073. "Burn Up Blade: Part 2 (A Sudden Hold On Me)" (萌えよ剣〜その2〜突然Hold on me, "Moeyo Ken -Sono 2- Totsuzen Hold on Me"); 074. "Burn Up Blade: Part 3 (Battle Royale: Big Sister VS. Little Sister)" (萌えよ剣〜その3〜決闘 姉VS.妹, "Moeyo Ken -Sono 3- Kettō Ane vs. Imōto!"); 075. "Shinobu's B-Line to Tokyo U ♥" (しのぶ, とーだい一直線, "Shinobu, Tōdai Itchokusen"); 076. "I Wanna Grow Up!" (オトナにありたい!, "Otona ni Naritai!"); 077. "A Sudden Proposal?" (突然プロポーズ?, "Totsuzen Puropōzu?"); 078. "An Honest I Love You" (素直にI Love You, "Sunao ni I Love You"); Ken Akamatsu x Megumi Hayashibara Love Love Talk! (Japan only)
Keitaro is finally a student at Tokyo University, but before starting the lessons he breaks his leg and he's forced to stay at home until summer. Finally he's able to confess his love to Naru, but she doesn't answer. Meanwhile Mokoto receives a visit from her older sister, Tsuruko, who wants to bring her home to make her inherit the dojo. Motoko, who feels she isn't ready for such a responsibility, pretends to be about to marry Keitaro to stay at Hinata House, but she is discovered and defeated in a duel by her sister. To redeem herself, they confront once again: if she wins will be free to remain to Hinata Inn, otherwise she will really marry Keitaro. With the help of both Ketaro and Naru, she's finally able to meet the challenge in some way. Shinobu dreams one day to get herself to Tokyo University to be with Keitaro, but her grades are not the best, so Keitaro first offers himself to help her at studying and then fulfills her desire for a date together. While he's still waiting for Naru's answer, Keitaro and the girls discover that Haruka and Professor Seta had been in a relationship when they were young, and they still feel something for each other.
10	January 17, 2001	978-4-06-312923-6	May 6, 2003	978-1-59182-116-8
079. "Kiss, Kiss, Kiss!" (キス·キス·キス!, "Kisu Kisu Kisu!"); 080. "A Sudden Summarizing Smooch! ♥" (トコナツDAITANチュ, "Tokonatsu Daitan Chu"); 081. "A Kiss Between the Sea and Sky" (空と海の間のキッス, "Sora to Umi no Aida no Kissu"); 082. "Memories a Blur?!" (記憶不鮮明!?, "Kioku Fusenmei!?"); 083. "For Whom the Wedding Bell Tolls" (ウェディングベルは誰が為に, "Wedingu Beru wa Ta ga Tame ni?"); 084. "The Season of Maidens in Love" (恋する乙女のキセツ, "Koisuru Otome no Kisetsu"); 085. "And When She Changed Her Attire" (彼女がスーツに着替えたら, "Kanojo ga Sūtsu ni Kigaetara"); 086. "I Miss You (A Week Later)" (1週間後のI miss you, "1 Shūkango no I Miss You"); 087. "Zen and the Art of Coming Out" (告白のタイミング, "Kamingu Auto no Taimingu")
Mutsumi calls Keitaro and Naru on holiday at her home in Okinawa. The two are very shy in spite of their feelings, so Mutsumi promises to help her friend. But then she kisses Keitaro right in front of Naru. Falling from a tree, Mutsumi has amnesia that shows when she, Keitaro and Naru were children and played together to the Hinata Inn. Mutsumi also becomes seriously ill, and only a great joy could save her, so she asks Keitaro to marry her. He agrees to stage the wedding, but everything seems all too real, and so Naru interrupts the ceremony. Mutsumi then challenge her to rock, paper, scissors with Keitaro as a prize for the winner, but in the end she loses on purpose. During this period, Naru remembers many things of their childhood. For losing his first semester at Tokyo University, Keitaro decides to follow Professor Seta in the USA for six months and develop his passion for archaeology.
11	April 17, 2001	978-4-06-312958-8	June 10, 2003	978-1-59182-117-5
088. "The Gift of a Moment" (神様がくれた瞬間, "Kamisama ga Kureta Toki"); 089. "Is That You... Naru?!" (なる... ...かな!?, "Naru... ...kana!?"); 090. "Hinata House's Last Stand?!" (ひなた荘, 最後の日!?, "Hinatasō, Saigo no Hi!?"); 091. "And Then There Were None?!" (そして誰みいなくなっちゃう!?, "Soshite Dare mo Inakunatchau!?"); 092. "A Criminal Correspondence" (罪つくりなエアメール, "Tsumi Tsukuri na Ea Mēru"); 093. "The Secret of the Smile ♥" (笑顔のヒミツ, "Egao no Himitsu"); 094. "A Love-Love Simulation" (恋の予行演習, "Raburabu no Shimyurēshon"); 095. "Trouble on the Hinata Front?!" (ひなた戦線異状アリ!?, "Hinata Sensen Ijō Ari!?"); 096. "Assault on Fort Hinata" (ひなた城討ち入りでござる, "Hinatajō Uchi Iri de gozaru")
Keitaro leaves for the USA, is seen off by the girls and especially Naru, and promises to return after six months. The expected time passes, and all are waiting for his return to the Hinata Inn, but they have a nasty surprise. In his place comes Kanako, Keitaro's sister, who has become the new manager in his absence. Skilled in disguise, she will turn the house into an inn, and while doing so puts girls at a crossroads: either work there to pay for the room, or they can go. All except Naru seem to give up, but eventually return to their steps and the situation appears to be improving. Kanako, however, has a real love for her brother, and when she realizes that all the girls have a crush on him, the war between them begins again. Only Naru and Mutsumi are on her side and want to help her fix things.
12	July 17, 2001	978-4-06-312991-5	July 8, 2003	978-1-59182-118-2
097. "Please Give Me This Memory!" (思い出をください!, "Omoide o Kudasai!"); 098. "Blonde Misgivings!!" (疑惑のキンパツ!!, "Giwaku no Kinpatsu"); 099. "A Double-Booked Promise!" (約束はダブルブッキング!, "Yakusoku wa Daburu Bukking!"); 100. "Sister Syndrome" (シスター·シンドローム, "Shisutā Shindorōmu"); 101. "A Future Overflowing With Magic" (魔力ミチミチテ, "Maryoku Michimichite"); 102. "Heart Break Crossing" (ハートブレイク·クロッシング, "Hātobureiku Kurosshingu"); 103. "Escape En Route With My Stalker" (逃避行はストーカーとともに, "Tōhikō wa Sutōkā to Tomo ni"); 104. "Never Give Up!" (ネバー·ギブアップ!, "Nebā Gibu Appu!"); 105. "Crazy For You to the Ends of the Earth" (さいはてのCrazy for you, "Saihate no Crazy For You")
Keitaro has finally returned to the delight of everyone in the Hinata Inn. The affection that Kanako has for him bothers Keitaro, and he tries to clear things up between her and Naru, but due to a series of misunderstandings, he can't. The other girls have realized that Keitaro's love is only Naru, so they ask the girl to confess her feelings, but she is still insecure and decides to leave for a while, starting a trip to the north of Japan. Keitaro and the rest of the girls chase her, while Kanako tries repeatedly to seduce her brother and make him forget Naru. But in the end, she realizes she isn't the woman he loves, and she decides to support their relationship. Arriving in the northernmost city in Japan after a long and thrilling car chase, Keitaro reiterates his feelings for Naru, and she finally manages to confess him her love and kiss him.
13	October 17, 2001	978-4-06-313029-4	August 12, 2003	978-1-59182-119-9
106. "Kiss Kiss Rhapsody." (Chu Chu狂騒曲, "Chu Chu Rapusodei"); 107. "Big Troubles For the Little Ronin Girl." (悩み多きローニン娘., "Nayami Ōki Rōnin Musume."); 108. "The Sword, Exams, and Love..." (剣も受験も恋愛も..., "Ken mo Juken mo Ren'ai mo..."); 109. "K and N's "Give Me Tokyo U or Give Me Death" Assault!" (景&成, 決死の東大行!, "Keitarō & Naru, Kesshi no Tōdai Kō!"); 110. "Set a Course For the Kingdom of Molmol." (モルモル王国へ進路を取れ, "Morumoru Ōkoku e Shinro o Tore"); 111. "God Save Kingtaro!" (国王を奪還せよ!, "Keitaro o Dakkanseyo!"); 112. "Todai - Honeymoon Capital of the World." (蜜月の街·トーダイ, "Hanemūn no Machi Tōdai"); 113. "A Wonderful Coup D'Etat." (素敵なクーデター?, "Suteki na Kūdetā?"); 114. "A Happy Todai Wedding." (はっぴぃトーダイウェディング, "Happī Tōdai Wedingu")
Motoko has feelings for Keitaro, even though she knows that he loves Naru, and this distracts her from studies and from training. The return of her sister Tsuruko does not improve things, but in the end Motoko confesses her love and manages to beat her sister in a duel, obtaining her permission to remain at the Hinata Inn and retry the exams to enter Tokyo University. Seta brings Keitaro into the Kingdom of Molmol for further research, and the girls discover that this is the land of origin of Su (who is also the princess). Not only that, the capital of the kingdom is called Todai, and a legend says that the first couple to enter the sacred ruins and kiss there live an everlasting love. Each girl tries to convince Keitaro to join her, but eventually they are convinced that Naru is the girl destined to marry him. At the last moment, however, everyone leaves this possibility to Seta and Haruka, who finally crown their dream of love.
14	January 17, 2002	978-4-06-313070-6	September 16, 2003	978-1-59182-120-5
115. "And When You Wake From Dreaming...?!" (夢から覚めたその瞬間...!?, "Yume kara Sameta Sono Shunkan...!?"); 116. "Secret Letter From Nyamo"; 117. "The Promise Girl (Part 1 of 2)" (約束の女の子 (前編), "Yakusoku no Onnanoko (Zenpen)"); 118. "The Promise Girl (Part 2 of 2)" (約束の女の子 (後編), "Yakusoku no Onnanoko (Kōhen)"); Bonus Pages; Epilogue I. "When the Cherry Blossoms Bloom" (桜咲く季節, "Sakura Saku Kisetsu"); Epilogue II. "Where We Begin" (はじまりはここから, "Hajimari wa Koko Kara"); Afterword
Keitaro and Naru can finally go to Tokyo University together, but she is worried because she fears not being the child to whom, when he was a child, he made the famous promise to. Nyamo sends Keitaro a letter in which he is called to Pararakelse to continue his excavations. The thought of his long absence, and the temporary departure of all the other girls of the Hinata Inn, pushes Naru to go home for a while. The words of Keitaro convince her to stay, and the arrival of Grandma Hinata finally reveals the mystery: Naru is in fact the girl of promise. Three years later, a new girl, Ema Maeda, who is very similar to the protagonists at the beginning of the story, arrives at the Hinata Inn the day before the wedding between Keitaro and Naru.
