= Nam Nam Alley =

Vietnamese lager beer

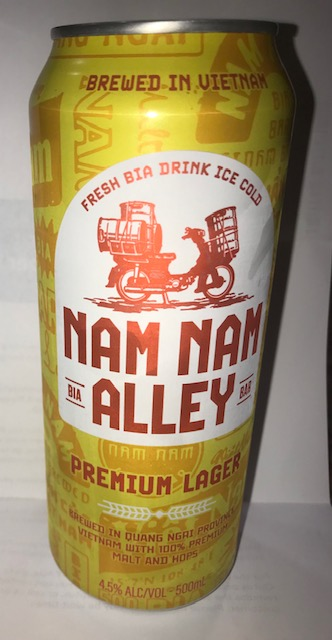
- Distributor: Pinnacle Drinks
- Origin: Vietnam
- Introduced: 2022
- Alcohol by volume: 4.5%

Nam Nam Alley is a lager-style beer brewed in Quang Ngai province in Vietnam. It is imported into Australia by Pinnacle Drinks, and sold through stores of the Endeavour Group, including Dan Murphy's and BWS.

The beer has an alcohol content of 4.5% ABV. It has been rated 2.93 out of 5 at the beer ratings website untappd.com.
