= NaMo Kabaddi =

Initiative to promote rural Indian kabaddi

NaMo Kabaddi (Narendra Modi Kabaddi) was a programme organised by the Bharatiya Janata Party (BJP)'s Kisan Morcha in November and December 2023 to play kabaddi matches across India. Only those between 18 and 40 years of age were allowed to participate.

NaMo Kabaddi was meant to reach rural youth by taking advantage of the rural popularity of traditional Indian games, and to give a political boost to the BJP.

== See also ==
- Kabaddi in India
- Pro Kabaddi League
- Khelo India
