= Namas Chandra =

Retired professor of the New Jersey Institute of Technology

- Born: April 17, 1952 (age 74)
- Education: Ph.D. Mechanical Engineering, Texas A&M University; M. S. Mechanical Engineering, University of Houston; AMIE Metallurgy, Institute of Engineers, Calcutta; B.E. Mechanical Engineering, University of Madras.
- Engineering career
- Discipline: Mechanical Engineering
- Institutions: University of Nebraska, Lincoln
- Projects: Trauma Mechanics Research Initiative

Namas Chandra (born April 17, 1952) is the retired Professor of Biomedical Engineering and Director, Center for Injury Bio-mechanics, Materials, and Medicine at New Jersey Institute of Technology. He was Elmer-Koch Professorship of Engineering and Associate Dean for research and Graduate Studies at the College of Engineering at the University of Nebraska-Lincoln (UNL). He was the director of the Trauma Mechanics Research Initiative and the BioMechanics and Materials Laboratory at UNL. He was also the Director of $5.8 M UNL-Army Center for Trauma Mechanics. From 1986 to 2006, he was at Department of Mechanical Engineering at the Florida State University. He finished his MS from University of Houston in 1983 and PhD from Texas A&M University in 1986. In 2005, he won FSU's 'Outstanding Researcher' award.

Chandra's research interests included materials science, mechanics of materials and structures, molecular dynamics, superplasticity, composites, and thermal properties of composites. His research was on the mechanics of improvised explosive devices (IEDs) and their effects on brain tissue. Chandra's study of traumatic brain injury (TBI) was primarily for the United States military, a major sponsor of the research initiative.

== Chapters in books ==
1. Superplastic Materials and Superplastic Metal Forming, Handbook of Metallurgical Process Design, ed. G. E. Totten, K. Funatani and L. Xie, Mercel Dekker Publications, ISBN 0-8247-4106-4, 46 Pages, 205-250 (2004).
2. Hierarchical Modeling of Deformation of Materials from the Atomic to Continuum Scale, Multiscale Modeling and Simulation of Composite Materials and Structures, ed. Y.W. Kwon, D. H. Allen, R. Talreja, Spring Publications, ISBN 0-8247-4106-4, 48 Pages, 579-624 (2008).

== Research contracts and grants ==
1. Factors that Facilitate or Inhibit Enrollment of Domestic Engineering PhD Students; A Mixed Methods Study, National Science Foundation, $149,851, PI: N. Chandra, 9/1/2009 to 8/30/2011.
2. UNL-Army Center for Trauma Mechanics, Army Research Office, $3,261,250, PI: N. Chandra, 9/1/2008 to 8/31/2010.
3. Adaptive heat sinks: alloyed copper/carbon nanofibers, Cooperation Program between Midi-Pyrenees and Aquitaine (FRANCE), €306, 900, co-PI: N. Chandra, 2006 to 2009 for Amelie Veillere.
4. Heat sinks with controlled architecture and carbon nanotubes and/or nanofibers, €657, 550, Research Foundation for aeronautics and space, co-PI: N. Chandra, 2006 to 2009 for Guillaume Lacombe.
5. UNL-Advance, National Science Foundation, $3, 181, 000, PI: B. Couture, Co-PI: N. Chandra, M. Holmes, J. McQuillan, D. Mandersheid, 7/01/2008 to 8/31/2013.
