= Economic policy of the Narendra Modi government =

The economic policies of the Narendra Modi government, also known as Modinomics, focused on privatization and liberalization of the economy, based on a neoliberal framework. Modi liberalized India's foreign direct investment policies, to allow for more foreign investment in several industries, including in defense and the railways. Other proposed reforms included making the forming of unions more difficult for workers, and making recruitment and dismissal easier for employers. In 2021–22, the foreign direct investment (FDI) in India was $82 billion. India's gross domestic savings rate stood at 29.3% of GDP in 2022.

== Economy ==
In his first budget, Finance Minister Arun Jaitley promised to gradually reduce the budgetary deficit from 4.1% to 3% over two years and to divest from shares in public banks.

Over Modi's first year in office, the Indian GDP grew at a rate of 7.5%. However, the first eight years of Modi's premiership, India's GDP grew at an average rate of 5.5% per cent compared to the rate of 7.03 per cent under the previous government. In recent years, independent economists and financial institutions have accused the government of manipulating various economic data, especially GDP growth rate.

In July 2014, Modi refused to sign a trade agreement that would permit the World Trade Organization to implement a deal agreed in Bali, citing that agreement will lead to "lack of protection to Indian farmers and the needs of food security" and "Lack of bargaining power". The addition to Indian airports grew by 23 percent in 2016 while the airfares dropped by over 25 percent.

The level of income inequality increased drastically, while an internal government report said that in 2017, unemployment had increased to its highest level in 45 years.

The loss of jobs was attributed to the 2016 demonetisation, and to the effects of the Goods and Service Tax. The last year of Modi's first term didn't see much economic development and focused on the policies of defence and on the basic formula of Hindutva.

His government focused on pension facilities for old-age group people and depressed sections of society. The economic growth rate in 2018-19 was recorded to be 6.1%, which was lower than the average rate of the first four years of premiership.

The fall in the growth rate was again attributed to the 2016 demonetisation and to the effects of the GST on the economy. In 2025, Modi's government announced reforms to the country's goods and services tax (GST).

=== Make in India ===
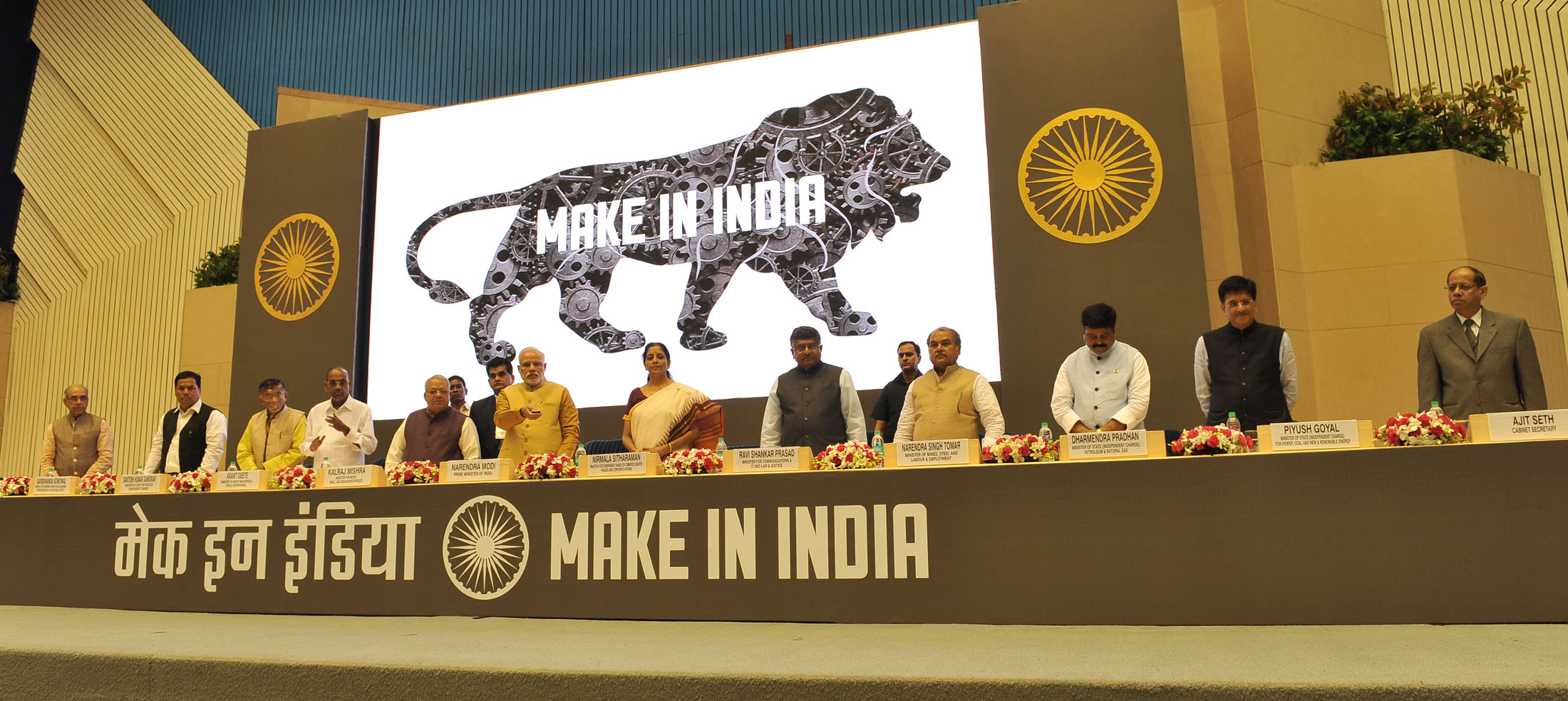
Indian Government at the launch of the Make in India program

In September 2014, Modi introduced the Make in India initiative to encourage foreign companies to manufacture products in India, with the goal of turning India into a global manufacturing hub. Supporters of economic liberalisation supported the initiative, while critics argued it would allow foreign corporations to capture a greater share of the Indian market. "Make in India" had three stated objectives:

- to increase the manufacturing sector's growth rate to 12-14% per annum
- to create 100 million additional manufacturing jobs in the economy by 2022
- to ensure that the manufacturing sector's contribution to GDP is increased to 25% by 2022 (later revised to 2025).

Make in India has been unsuccessful at achieving its stated targets. Under this programme, the share of manufacturing in GDP was projected to reach 25% by 2022. However, the GDP share of manufacturing has actually fallen from 16.7% in 2013–2014 to 15.9% in 2023–2024.

== Labour ==
Modi's labour reforms received support from institutions such as the World Bank but faced opposition from scholars, socialist and communist parties, and worker rights groups within the country. The labour laws also drew strong resistance from unions: on 2 September 2015, eleven of the country's largest unions went on strike, including one affiliated with the BJP. The strike was estimated to have cost the economy $3.7 billion.

The Bharatiya Mazdoor Sangh, a constituent of the Sangh Parivar, stated that the reforms would hurt labourers by making it easier for corporations to exploit them.

== Healthcare ==
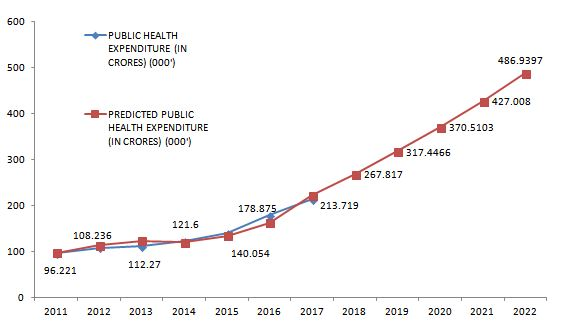
Forecasting public healthcare expenditure by Government of India

India's health budget increases under Modi's premiership have been criticised as disappointing despite new measures such as expanded health insurance, a national dialysis programme, and more government-run pharmacies offering low-cost generic medicines. While private healthcare welcomed these steps, public health experts expressed concerns that public healthcare funding remains inadequate, and that public health services were being outsourced to the private sector.

The COVID-19 pandemic led to a major economic fallout in India, with a rise in poverty, unemployment, and a recession. In May 2020, Modi announced an overall economic stimulus package worth ₹20 lakh crore (equivalent to ₹26 trillion or US$270 billion in 2026). By December 2020, it was revealed that less than 10% of the stimulus had been disbursed. By December 2021, India was back to pre-COVID-19 growth.

== Public transportation ==
The government entered into significant agreements with General Electric and Alstom to supply India with 1,000 new diesel locomotives as part of a broader effort to reform the Indian railway system, which also encompassed privatisation initiatives.

In December 2015, the Modi administration signed an agreement with Japan to jointly develop a high-speed rail network connecting Mumbai and Ahmedabad.

Under his leadership, the Railway Budget was merged with the Union Budget of India. Additionally, the date for presenting the budget was changed from 28 February to 1 February, and the financial year was adjusted from July to April. Moreover, the distinction between planned and non-planned expenditure was abolished. The Modi government also dismantled the Foreign Investment Promotion Board (FIPB), which had been viewed as a barrier to foreign direct investments.

== See also ==
- Privatisation of public sector undertakings in India
- Premiership of Narendra Modi
- Timeline of the Narendra Modi premiership
- Foreign policy of the Narendra Modi government
