= Namo River =

River in the United States territory of Guam

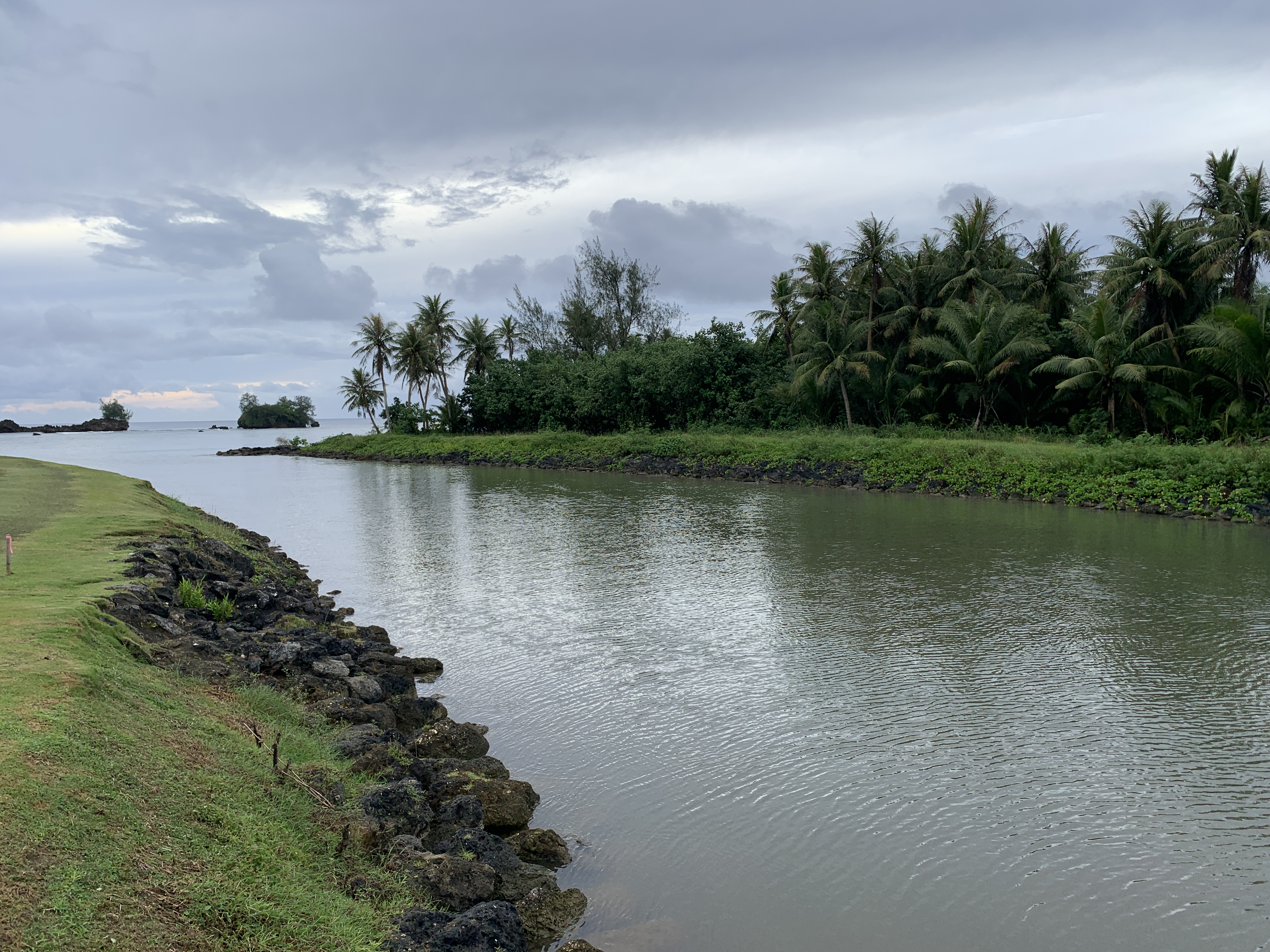

Location
- Country: Guam

Physical characteristics
- Mouth
  - coordinates: 13.4013889°N 144.6597222°E

The Namo River is a river in the United States territory of Guam.

== See also ==
- List of rivers of Guam
- Namo Falls
