= Naamah =

Naamah or Na'amah can refer to:

== Religion ==
- Naamah (Genesis), the daughter of Lamech the Cainite
- Naamah, Noah's wife in some extra-Biblical traditions
- Naamah (wife of Solomon), mother of Rehoboam
- Naamah, a city of Canaan, listed in Joshua as having been conquered and subsequently settled by the Tribe of Judah
- Naamah (demon), one of the demonic wives of the archangel Samael in the Zohar
- Naamah Kelman (born 1955), American-born rabbi and dean of the Hebrew Union College – Jewish Institute of Religion

== Music ==
- "Dark Princess Naamah" and "Invocation of Naamah", songs from Swedish symphonic metal band Therion
- Nahemah (band), a Spanish progressive death metal band

== Literature ==
- Naamah, one of the Companions of Elua in Jacqueline Carey's Kushiel's Legacy saga
- Naamah, an antagonist in the Dragons In Our Midst series by Bryan Davis (author)
- Naamah Darling, Andan Cly's airship in the Clockwork Century books by Cherie Priest

== Gaming ==
- Naamah, a changeling girl in the roleplay game Changeling: the Lost
- Naamah, a Manei Domini agent of the Word of Blake in the tabletop war game BattleTech
- Naamah the Soul-Eater, boss of the Sanctum Of Destruction hero map on Grand Chase

== See also ==
- Namah (disambiguation)
- Naama (disambiguation)
- Nama (disambiguation)
