= Swarnim Bharat Ke Swapnadrishta Narendra Modi =

2014 nonfiction book by Vijay Nahar

- Author: Vijay Nahar
- Language: Hindi
- Genre: reference work
- Publisher: Pinkcity Publishers, Jaipur
- Publication date: 2014
- Publication place: India
- Pages: 260
- ISBN: 9789380522500

Swarnim Bharat Ke Swapnadrishta Narendra Modi is a 2014 nonfiction book written by Vijay Nahar and published by Pinkcity Publishers. The book covers the personal and political life of Narendra Modi based on references and press releases. It contains details of his childhood and marriage, and covers his time as RSS member, Gujarat Chief Minister, and BJP prime minister.

== History ==
The book was published in 2014, and was selected for government school libraries in Rajasthan in 2017. Rajasthan State Education Minister Vasudev Devnani claimed that the book would help students build character and remind the present generation about the contributions of their national heroes.

The book was promoted by Rashtriya Swayamsevak Sangh (RSS) leader Indresh Kumar, ex-State BJP President of Rajasthan Ashok Parnami, and ex-Vice Chancellor of MDS University P. L. Chaturvedi at the Rajasthan Chamber of Commerce and Industries. At the book launch Nahar stated that Modi was born to a financially weak Other Backward Caste Ghanchi family and that he displayed qualities such as self-dependence, self-respect, courage, and determination from childhood.

The book is said to have revealed the truth about Modi and his wife Jasodaban. The book says that after completing his education, Modi's family forced him to bring Jasodaban home, but he told his family to ask Jasodaban's parents to marry her off to another man. As in the book, Modi married Jasodaban as per Ghanchi's tradition in childhood. Living in Ahmedabad, Narendra Modi's personality was also very effective. He had become a leader of the student and a senior officer of the Sangh. The big men of the metropolis came to meet him and advise him. Father-Mother and elder brother were also afraid of putting emphasis on such an effective personality. Were hesitant. They also knew this very well that Narendra Modi will do the same thing which he has decided. Nobody can distract them. In such a case, the talk of marriage has ignored. Nahar wrote in the book that Modi was receiving 5 Rs. wage to carry one oil container for an oil company. He sold tea and water bottles at the railway platform. In this book, comparison of Narendra Modi and Arvind Kejriwal's 14-page article has been compared. While Rahul Gandhi's mention in astrology article, only two times is related to his zodiac sign. In this article, the future fruits of Sonia Gandhi and Manmohan Singh have been compared to Modi.

Author Vijay Nahar worked as Prant Pracharak of Rashtriya Swayamsevak Sangh and has written various reference books on Indian history and political leaders. His other popular books include Vasundhara Raje aur Vikasit Rajasthan, Samrat Bhoj Parmar, Aapaatkaal Ke Kaale Divas, Prarambhik Islamic Aakraman Evam Bhartiya Pratirodh, and Aadhunik Bharat Ke Bramharshi-Pt. Deendayal Upadhyaya.
