= Nama (wine) =

Nama (Greek: Νάμα) is a sweet red wine that is usually used in Greek Orthodox Churches in Holy Communion. It is similar to Mavrodaphne, with the difference that it is sweeter and it contains less alcohol.

In Greece 'Narma' is a controlled appellation corresponding to the grape variety.

== See also ==
- Greek wine
