= Namas (rishi) =

Sage in Hinduism

Namas was an ancient sage (rishi), who was a descendant of Sage Kashyapa.
