= NAMA (gene) =

RNA gene found in humans

Identifiers
- Aliases: NAMA, non-protein coding RNA, associated with MAP kinase pathway and growth arrest
- External IDs: GeneCards: NAMA

Gene location (Human)
Chr.	Chromosome 9 (human)
Band	9q22.33	Start	99,355,337 bp
Band	9q22.33	End	99,377,240 bp
RNA expression pattern
Bgee	Human / Mouse (ortholog); Top expressed in: testicle; bone marrow cell; gonad; right testis; left testis; gastrocnemius muscle; skeletal muscle tissue; muscle of thigh; right hemisphere of cerebellum; tonsil / n/a; More reference expression data
BioGPS	n/a
Orthologs
Databases	NCBI: entry; OMA: entry
Species	Human	Mouse
Entrez	100996569	n/a
Ensembl	ENSG00000271086	n/a
UniProt	n a	n/a
RefSeq (mRNA)	n/a	n/a
RefSeq (protein)	n/a	n/a
Location (UCSC)	Chr 9: 99.36 – 99.38 Mb	n/a
PubMed search		n/a
- Wikidata
View/Edit Human

NAMA (noncoding RNA associated with MAP kinase pathway and growth arrest) is a long non-coding RNA gene. It is induced by cell growth arrest, apoptosis, and inhibition of the MAP kinase pathway.

== See also ==
- Long noncoding RNA
