= Namo Falls =

- Interactive map of Namo Falls
- Location: Agat, Guam
- Coordinates: 13°23′27″N 144°40′22″E
- Watercourse: Namo River

The Namo Falls are two waterfalls, the Grandmother (Guella) and the Grandfather (Guello), in the Namo River within the Namo park area on the island of Guam. The botanical park is located on the border of the villages of Agat and Santa Rita off Route 12, in the south-west coast of the island. The Namo Falls Botanic Park is privately owned and a fee is required. The park provides a walk through a botanic garden featuring tropical flowers like mangoes, breadfruit, coconut, star apple, jackfruit, bananas, hibiscus, bougainvillea, orchids, and a large variety of gingers and heliconias, The Grandmother Falls (Guella) can be used for swimming.
