= Om Namah Shivaya (disambiguation) =

Om Namah Shivaya or Om Namah Shivay is a mantra in Hinduism dedicated to Shiva.

It may also refer to:

- Om Namah Shivay (1997 TV series), a 1997 Indian television series
- Om Namah Shivay (2018 TV series), a 2018 Indian Bengali television series
- Om Namah Shivay (album), a 1999 album by Nina Hagen

== See also ==
- Om Namo Bhagavate Vāsudevāya, a Hindu mantra dedicated to Vishnu
- Oṃ Namaḥ Siddhanam or Namokar Mantra, a Jain mantra
