= Namsos =

Namsos may refer to:

== Places ==
- Namsos Municipality, a municipality in Trøndelag county, Norway
- Namsos (town), a town within Namsos Municipality in Trøndelag county, Norway
- Namsos Airport, an airport in Namsos Municipality in Trøndelag county, Norway
- Namsos Church, a church in Namsos Municipality in Trøndelag county, Norway
- Namsos Hospital, a hospital in Namsos Municipality in Trøndelag county, Norway
- Vemundvik Municipality, Nord-Trøndelag county, Norway; formerly called the landdistrikt of Namsos herred (1838–1891)

== Other ==
- Namsos IL, a sports club based in Namsos Municipality in Trøndelag county, Norway
- Namsos Line, a now-defunct railway line in Trøndelag county, Norway
- Namsos Trafikkselskap, a public transport company based in Namsos, Norway
- Namsos campaign, a campaign in Norway during World War II
