= NaMo Grand Central Park =

Urban public park in India

- नमो ग्रँड सेंट्रल पार्क
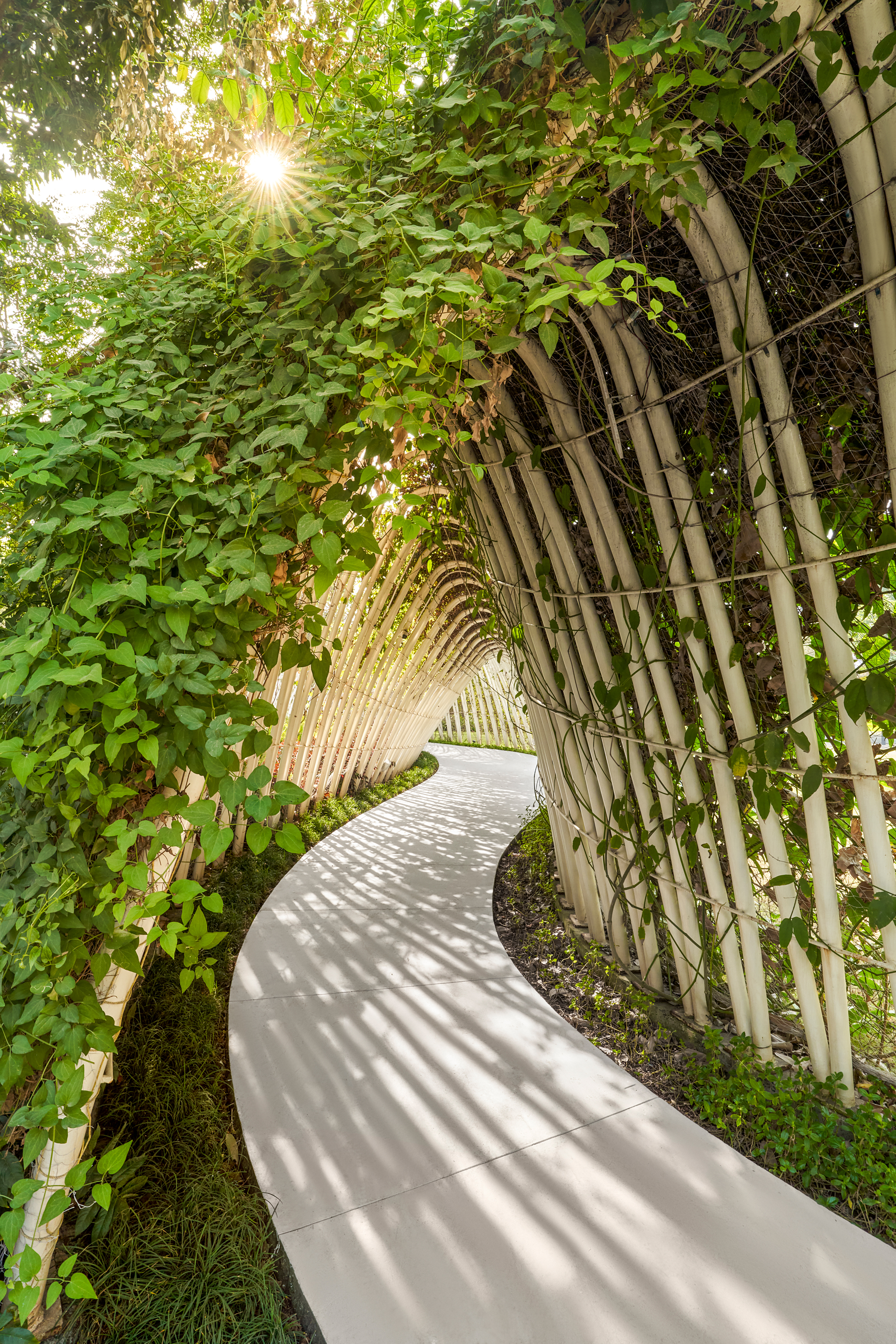
- Flora Trellis at the Grand Central Park, Thane
- Interactive map of NaMo Grand Central Park
- Type: Urban and public park
- Location: Thane, Maharashtra, India
- Coordinates: 19°13′44″N 72°59′25″E
- Area: 20.5 acres (8.296 ha; 0.083 km^{2}; 0.032 mi^{2})
- Created: 9 February 2024
- Operator: Thane Municipal Corporation (Thane Municipal Corporation)
- Status: Open all year, Monday to Sunday: 6:00am to 11:00am and 13:00 to 23:00

NaMo Grand Central Park (नमो ग्रँड सेंट्रल पार्क) is an urban public park located on Kolshet Road in Thane, India. The 20.5-acre project includes themed parks, a three-acre lake with landscaped promenade, bridge for selfies and various other facilities like a 400m jogging track, amphitheater and an open gymnasium among others.

== Background ==
The construction work was flagged off by the Shiv Sena President Uddhav Thackeray on Saturday 29 July 2017. The project cost of 90cr will be bourne by the developer Kalpataru Group.

The park was opened to the public in February 2024 by Maharashtra Chief Minister Eknath Shinde. Developed under the Suvidha Plot Development Project by the Thane Municipal Corporation, the NaMo Grand Central Park draws inspiration from renowned parks worldwide, including New York's Grand Central Park and London's Hyde Park.

It is named after the Prime Minister of India, Narendra Modi.

== Activities ==
The Grand Central Park features a diverse collection of over 3,500 tree species and provides various amenities to enhance visitor experience. These include four themed parks—a Mughal garden, a Chinese park, a Moroccan park showcasing Moroccan culture, and a Japanese garden. Additionally, the park offers facilities for fitness activities such as a jogging track, a skating yard, tennis and volleyball courts, play equipment for children, and designated spaces for yoga and meditation along with a large open amphitheater. Due to its diverse ecosystem, the park is likely to attract various bird species.

The park’s greenery is said to be able to generate 8.84 lakh pounds of oxygen each year and the park can accommodate approximately 5000 visitors at any given time
