= Naama =

Naama may refer to:

- NAAMA, the National Arab American Medical Association
- Naâma, municipality in Algeria, capital of Naâma Province
- Naâma Province in Algeria
- Naama Bay, resort town in Egypt, just north of Sharm El Sheikh
- Nāma, Pali and Sanskrit for "name"
- Naamam, the identification mark of South Indian Vaishnavites
- Naama (singer), Tunisian singer
- Naama, Bong County, Liberia
- Naama, a composition by Iannis Xenakis

== See also ==
- Naamah (disambiguation)
