= List of Love Hina characters =

This is a list of fictional characters in the anime and manga series Love Hina created by Ken Akamatsu. The character names are listed in Western order, with the given name before the family name.

Note because the story spans over several years, any characters age mentioned below describes their age at the point of their introduction.

== Main characters ==
The main characters are residents of the Hinata Inn, a former hot springs resort that is converted to an all-girls dormitory managed by Keitaro Urashima, the sole male resident.

=== Keitaro Urashima ===
Keitaro Urashima (浦島 景太郎, Urashima Keitarō) is a second-year ronin studying to enter Tokyo University (abbreviated as "Todai"). As a child, Keitaro made a promise to a girl, based on a story the children overheard, that two people who love each other will live "happily ever after" if they enter 'Todai'. Keitaro is set on gaining entrance to Todai to fulfill the promise he made to his childhood friend, even though he cannot recall her name or her face. Later, in volume 13, it is revealed that Todai may not even refer to Tokyo University after all.

After failing to pass the entrance exams on his second attempt, Keitaro's parents seem unwilling and/or unable to let him continue living at home while he studies. He then receives a call from his grandmother. As a result, he travels to "Hinata Inn", a hotel owned by his grandmother, to find a place to stay and study. Following a misunderstanding where the residents believe him to be a burglar and a peeping tom, Keitaro discovers the hotel is now a female-only dormitory.

To compound the confusion, Keitaro's Aunt Haruka mistakenly assumes he has passed the entrance exams and is already a Todai student; consequently, the residents agree to let him stay. When he fails to correct her, and they discover that he is lying, Keitaro is forced to leave until Haruka announces that his grandmother has transferred the ownership of the inn to him. Keitaro, thus, becomes the new landlord.

In the anime television series, Keitaro is voiced by Yūji Ueda in Japanese and Derek Stephen Prince in English. Keitaro's name is supposedly taken from manga artist Keitarō Arima. It is also believed to be a pun on the Japanese myth of fisherman Urashima Tarō.

=== Naru Narusegawa ===
Naru Narusegawa (成瀬川 なる, Narusegawa Naru) is a 17-year-old resident of the Hinata Inn, who is about to graduate from high school. She is very intelligent, having placed top in the nation in the college practice entrance exams at their cram school. She is popular and beautiful, but constantly tries to hide this as she studies to gain entrance to Todai. However, she has an extremely fiery temper and tends to inflict violent physical punishment (mostly on Keitaro). She arrived at the Hinata Inn as a result (she believes) of her friendship with Kitsune, who introduced her to Granny Hina. At that stage, she does not remember staying at the Hinata Inn as a very young child.

Of all the girls at the Hinata Inn, she is most often the unwilling and unwitting victim of Keitaro's clumsiness, which often results in her ending up naked, partially clothed, or placed in any number of compromising positions. Keitaro invariably suffers as a result.

Despite initially taking a (literally) violent dislike of Keitaro, she comes to develop very strong feelings for him. The main part of her character arc is that she has great difficulty in admitting these feelings, both to herself, to the hopeless Keitaro, and the world in general. Due to this, she often becomes annoyed or irritated with Keitaro when she believes he is not taking things seriously. Naru had repeatedly denied having feelings for Keitaro even when asked. Naru while speaking to Mutsumi said, "What could you possibly see in a guy like that? You probably don't know this Mutsumi-san, but he's clumsy, stupid, and a total pervert that has no redeeming qualities whatsoever!". She also says to Kanako she would spy on him or sabotage any dates he did get but finds the idea of dating him herself disgusting. This comment and similar situations are played for laughs. When they do date, she hits Keitaro occasionally. Like Keitaro, she strives to get into Tokyo University for two reasons: the first is a promise she made to her one-time tutor (and object of an enormous crush) Noriyasu Seta, and the second is the dimly recalled promise made to someone whose name and face she cannot remember.

In the anime television series, Naru is voiced by Yui Horie in Japanese and Dorothy Melendrez in English.

=== Mutsumi Otohime ===
Mutsumi Otohime (乙姫 むつみ, Otohime Mutsumi) is a very sweet, gentle, kind, and soft-spoken girl. Naru and Keitaro first encounter her while taking some time off for a brief vacation after the three of them failed on their Todai entrance exam. Keitaro and Mutsumi failed for a third successive time, and Naru failed for the first time.

Despite her ditziness, she is very intelligent and empathetic. Mutsumi also has anemia which caused all sorts of situations, but she is actually extremely resilient, having a strong vice-like grip even when she first appeared and just like Keitaro is seemingly able to recover quickly. Naru notices in both the manga and anime the similarities between Keitaro and Mutsumi many times. One such notable time was when they believed they first met Mutsumi (they are actually all friends from childhood) on Naru and Keitaro's trip to Kyoto. She has a very sweet and generous personality. Being very empathetic to others, Mutsumi often puts others happiness before herself. She can also be comically clumsy at times, another trait like Keitaro. She lives on a small island off the west coast of Okinawa's main island city Naha with her parents and seven younger siblings before moving closer to the Hinata herself. Over the course of the manga she gradually gets over her anemia to the point that in the latter parts it has left her.

Both beautiful and kind-hearted, Mutsumi shows superlative optimism when faced with even the most difficult of situations. She has a number of unusual abilities, such as being able to speak "turtlese", which she uses to communicate with her turtles, namely Tama; the extreme habit of putting others' happiness before her own; a very strong propensity for watermelons; and sleepwalking on a few rare occasions (which led her into trouble once as she sleepwalked out of her window and was hit by a car). Despite her many eccentricities, she is extremely intelligent, scoring full marks in the practice exams. Yet, she still fails to get into Tokyo University because, among other things, she forgets to write her name on the test paper, causing her to obtain a grade of Z, or fainting from her anemia.

In both manga and the anime, Mutsumi is very intuitive and has a keen eye for details, noticing things her friends do not, such as, but not limited to, being the only one to know that Pararakelse island was on the opposite side of the international dateline which meant Keitaro would still be able to send his letter in time to Tokyo U and thus finally be able to attend. In the anime, she is the only one who could instinctively tell Keitaro and Kaolla Su's brother (cousin) apart and knew which was which at all times, excluding Keitaro and Lamba themselves.

It is revealed in volume 10 that as a young child, Mutsumi spent some time living at the Hinata inn. She had learned of the stories of how if a couple was to attend Tokyo U together, they will find happiness and in turn told Keitaro of the story because she (Mutsumi) wanted to go to Tokyo U with Keitaro. She then played matchmaker for Naru and Keitaro after it became clear that Naru liked Keitaro. Mutsumi let him go for Naru's sake by deliberately losing a game of rock-paper-scissors to decide which of them would become Keitaro's wife (deliberately losing a game of rock-paper-scissors is something she would do a second time in the manga during the mock wedding started to help her regain her memory after falling from a tree while she was trying to help Naru down from the tree), although she (Mutsumi) loved Keitaro (and admits that she still loves him to Naru).

But even after that Naru had forgotten all about her promise to Keitaro, Mutsumi then made a subsequent promise with Naru that both of them would later go to Tokyo University so Naru would remember the promise made to Keitaro. Before leaving Hinata, she gave Naru her Liddo-kun doll in memory of their friendship. She eventually moves to an apartment very close to the Hinata Inn and starts working at the Hinata Teashop for Haruka Urashima, even staying in a spare room at Haruka's Teashop after her apartment burnt down on New Year's Eve. Like Keitaro and Naru, she finally passes the Todai entrance exam, discovering her result just before setting off to rescue Keitaro from the island of Pararakelse.

She studies at Todai, and later is the only one of the group to enter a graduate school. At the end of the manga, she helps out in organizing Keitaro and Naru's wedding, and she brings a plethora of watermelons.

Mutsumi is skilled at cooking and like Keitaro is exceptional at baking cakes and other confectioneries.

Tamago or Tama for short was originally Mutsumi's pet turtle, That she gives to Naru after she and Keitaro help her get back to her home in Okinawa. But Tama's friendship with her is as strong as ever.

Mutsumi is also the only one of the girls to never intentionally cause physical harm to Keitaro.

She enjoys collecting photo stickers, a hobby she and Keitaro share.

Mutsumi is stated as being very well-endowed, even though her clothes downplay her hourglass figure. Her bust is the biggest of all the girls, which is used for comical effect and fan service many times throughout the anime/manga series.

Tokyopop sometimes misspells her name as "Mitsumi" or "Matsumi".

In the anime television series, Mutsumi is voiced by Satsuki Yukino in Japanese and Julie Ann Taylor in English.

=== Shinobu Maehara ===
Shinobu Maehara (前原 しのぶ, Maehara Shinobu) is a 13-year-old schoolgirl who, after getting off to a bad start with Keitaro, develops a crush on him. Shinobu is a boarder at the Hinata Inn, in room 201. In the anime, she is introduced as a grieving girl who has run away from home due to domestic turmoil. However, in the manga, she is already at the Hinata Inn when Keitaro arrives, and her parents are still together. Shinobu is quite skilled in cooking and household chores, so she becomes the resident cook (in the anime, her family once owned a restaurant in town before their divorce). Quiet and shy, she contributes to her emotional frailty.

She is the first girl to fall for Keitaro, and in the manga, she attempts to avoid him because of this. In both the anime and manga, she holds Keitaro in high regard and is often on the verge of tears when Shinobu believes that he is in trouble or likes someone else.

Shinobu decides to leave home and live at the Hinata Inn because of the marital problems between her father and her mother, whose names are never mentioned (in the anime). Their marital problems lead to their divorce. Shinobu's parents arrive at the Hinata Inn and argue over whom Shinobu should live with. However, Shinobu decides to remain at the Hinata Inn, which her mother is against as she believes the Hinata Inn is a bad place full of rowdy young girls. They eventually concede, allowing Shinobu to remain living at the Inn.

Four years later (in the epilogue), she has since grown her hair out and has become more mature, though she retains her sincere personality. She still has a crush on Keitaro and hasn't given up on her dream of becoming his girlfriend (even though Keitaro is set to marry Naru).

In the anime television series, Shinobu is voiced by Masayo Kurata in Japanese and Ellen Arden in English.

=== Motoko Aoyama ===
Motoko Aoyama (青山 素子, Aoyama Motoko) is an intense 15-year-old school girl, who practices the martial art of kendo, as well as being a member of the Shinmei-ryū sword school (which is also referred to in Akamatsu's later work Mahou Sensei Negima, as the school of the character Setsuna). Motoko is a resident at the Hinata Inn, living in room 302.

She has difficulty relating to other people, especially men, whom she finds to be a distraction that keeps her from being able to concentrate fully on her studies and practice. She also dislikes men because her sister left the dojo to marry. Her relationship with Keitaro initially resembles Naru's relationship with him in some ways; all too often he finds himself on the receiving end of various attacks as a result of his frequent mishaps or simply bad luck. She eventually warms up to him somewhat and eventually finds herself developing strong feelings for him, which she vehemently denies until near the end of the series. On two occasions, this causes severe problems for both Motoko and Keitaro. In later volumes, she develops a habit of writing trashy romance stories involving the two of them, often involuntarily.

Motoko has an older sister, Tsuruko, who gave up the life of the sword to marry. Tsuruko is far stronger at kendo than Motoko; Motoko both greatly admires and fears her older sister. However, Tsuruko believes that Motoko has more potential than she herself does, and that Motoko lost her drive to improve when Tsuruko married. Motoko is also the next in line to inherit the Aoyama family's Kyoto dojo, as she is not married. It is notable that Tsuruko is actually Motoko's biological sister, as they are two of the few characters in the series who are siblings by blood relation (the second siblings couple is presented by Kaolla and Amalla Su).

Motoko has only two serious fears in the world: Tsuruko and, for some unspecified reason, turtles (even though Tsuruko correlates it to her intense dislike for men).

In the anime, Motoko is popular at her school for her kendo skills. She frequently spends time with Sachiyo Matsumoto (松本 幸代, Matsumoto Sachiyo), Emi Ichikawa (市川 えみ, Ichikawa Emi) and Kikuko Onoue (尾上 菊子, Onoue Kikuko), who are all fans of her. Kikuko is especially protective of Motoko and has criticised Motoko's change in personality and decline in kendo skills since Keitaro began living at Hinata Inn, referring to him as a distraction. In the anime television series, Motoko is voiced by Yū Asakawa in Japanese and Mona Marshall in English.

=== Kaolla Su ===
Kaolla Su (カオラ・スゥ, Kaora Sū) is a 13-year-old foreign transfer student. She is also a boarder at the Hinata Inn, in room 301.

Su is the princess of Molmol, a fictional island nation located near the International Date Line. The dot on her forehead seems to have something to do with the 3-eyed symbol of Molmol. She is often barefoot and dressed in nothing else except her heavily altered school uniform in almost every anime episode and manga chapter, or some otherwise scant costume. To top her personality, she is above all extremely hyperactive, usually hugging (or, in Keitaro's case, kicking) someone, trying to eat something, especially bananas and Tama-chan, or inventing some potentially dangerous new device. She also has a tendency to snuggle against a person while she is sleeping, and usually crushes them while doing it.

Molmol is a kingdom where the moon sometimes appears red. It also uses a western naming order, although the Hinata Inn residents never seem to pick this up until later: Su is actually Kaolla Su's family name.

Su likes all the other residents in the Hinata Apartments and gets along well with them, though they have difficulty keeping up with her hyperactive tendencies; only the athletic Motoko seems to be able to tolerate and keep up with her. Her like for Keitaro stems from the fact that he reminds her of the person she refers to as her older brother (actually her cousin, whom she grew up with). However, it can be inferred that she eventually comes to care about Keitaro as much as and perhaps even more than her older brother.

While she has stated that she likes everyone in the Hinata apartments (including Sarah, who was sent there for a short period of time), it is apparent that Kaolla shares a much deeper relationship with Sarah and Motoko as compared to the other residents. Her ambition is to return to her homeland to start a computing school and transform her country into a technological power that will rival, and eventually conquer, Japan.

Su also possesses the ability to transform into a more adult version of herself on a single night every year, when the moon glows red. In the anime, she admitted having fallen in love with Keitaro while she was in this form, despite her transformation just last a few seconds because there was no red moon. Though this is not explicitly stated in the manga, it is implied extremely heavily, with the adult Su even kissing Keitaro and proclaiming herself his girlfriend afterwards.

Her room in the Hinata Inn is a faithful recreation of Molmol's natural habitat, complete with banana trees, a waterfall, and a small lake, along with a high-tech laboratory. In the anime television series, Su is voiced by Reiko Takagi in Japanese and Wendee Lee in English.

=== Mitsune "Kitsune" Konno ===
Mitsune Konno (紺野 みつね, Konno Mitsune), also known as Kitsune, which means "fox" in Japanese, is a 19-year-old freelance writer (who never seems to write anything). She is frequently drunk and seems to enjoy teasing Keitaro at every opportunity. Kitsune is also a boarder at the Hinata Inn, in room 205. She rarely pays any rent or contributes and has had a number of low paying jobs. Despite this she has never been evicted from the lodge. Her best friend is Naru. Although Naru is the more intellectual of the two, Kitsune is often the one to see things sensibly (although often she will encourage madness out of boredom), though she usually tries to reason when things are really out of control. Her nickname comes from a combination of her first and last names, and the fact that she hardly ever fully opens both eyes at the same time (mostly when she is surprised). As a result, she has a perpetually fox-like, vulpine expression. She's a practical joker and troublemaker; her mission in life seems to be to ensure that things never get too dull or those around her too complacent. She is also seen drinking a lot. She speaks with a Kansai dialect. In the manga (Volume 4) Kitsune's bedroom walls are densely lined with bottles of alcoholic drinks. She is also the one who taught Kaolla Japanese.

Kitsune is more flirtatious, especially with Keitaro, than any of the other residents. Mostly this is to tease him; however, she does develop a strong crush on him; eventually she shows little serious romantic interest in him. She is also the bustiest in the household, her bust being second only to Mutsumi Otohime in size, and is unafraid of using her charms to get what she wants, whatever it might be. Her relationship with Keitaro eventually develops into a "little brother/big sister" connection (though Keitaro is actually older than she is).

She also is a bit greedy, as seen in a flashback sequence when she tells Keitaro about how much Naru's innocence ended up dismissing possible boyfriends; Kitsune was shown to encourage her to date a rich boy just because of his wealth. Also, when the girls are traveling to Molmol to try to bring Keitaro back to Hinata Inn, the only thing she thinks of is the inheritance that will be left to him and the girl that he chooses whenever Hina returns, even though, later on, Kitsune lets him stay with Naru. She eventually takes over the Hinata Tea House when Haruka leaves and picks up Haruka's habit of smoking. Between the start and the finish Kitsune held two other jobs. Her name is derived from the name of manga artist Mitsune Ayasaka. In the anime television series, Kitsune is voiced by Junko Noda in Japanese and Barbara Goodson in English.

== Relatives ==
=== Haruka Urashima ===
Haruka Urashima (浦島 はるか, Urashima Haruka) is Keitaro Urashima's "aunt" (actually his cousin). In the anime, she dislikes being called aunt by Keitaro and often smashes him in the face when she is referred to as and corrects him by saying "its Haruka-san" (san being a respectful term to your elder in most cases)

Haruka Urashima is the only child of Hinata Urashima's eldest daughter, Yoko Urashima; her second daughter was Keitaro's mother. After the death of Yoko, Hinata adopted her granddaughter. Therefore, Haruka is Keitaro's legal aunt in addition to being his actual cousin. It was as a teenager that, while working at the inn, she was first called "Aunty Haruka" by her baby cousin Keitaro – the same time that Keitaro first met both Mutsumi and Naru.

Haruka is the ryōbo ("house-mother") of the Joshi Senyō Ryō Hinata-sō ("Women's Only Dormitory, Hinata House") and runs the Wafū Chabō Hinata ("Traditional Japanese Tea-Room Hinata"). Haruka is constantly seen smoking a cigarette. Like Naru, she has a fiery temper (and great physical prowess to match), which she hides under a calm, detached exterior.

Having traveled the world with Seta and Sara's mom, and it is hinted that a love triangle existed between the three at one point (or at least that Haruka and Seta were romantically involved); this is explored more fully in the manga, to the point that Haruka and Seta get married. Haruka's skills in martial arts rival Seta's and can even surpass his when she is angry. She is also very skilled with firearms, which shows when she shoots Kaolla's missiles at Seta's head after being teased by him. Haruka is voiced by Megumi Hayashibara in Japanese and Jane Alan in English.

=== Hinata Urashima ===
Hinata Urashima (浦島 ひなた, Urashima Hinata), also known as Grandma Hina, is the original manager of Hinata. Upon retiring, she entrusted Keitaro with looking over the Hinata Inn, so she could travel the world.

In the manga, Grandma Hina knew all along that Naru was the girl Keitaro promised to go to Tokyo U with. She also knew the location of the Liddo-Kun shaped time capsule Keitaro, Naru, and Mutsumi buried beneath the sandbox when they were children. In the anime television series, Grandma Hina is voiced by Masako Nozawa in Japanese and Barbara Goodson in English.

=== Noriyasu Seta ===
Noriyasu Seta (瀬田 記康, Seta Noriyasu) is a Tokyo University graduate and professor who specialises in archaeology, appearing to be a parody of Indiana Jones. Like Keitaro, he was a third-year ronin. He's clumsy — especially with women, and his relationship to Haruka seems to be similar to Keitaro's relationship with Naru (i.e., both get physically thrashed around by their respective female and are married to them eventually as well as both of them apparently being invulnerable to just about everything), a terrible driver (his arrival often heralded by his van crashing down from the sky), and an exceptionally skilled martial artist, all partly due to his complete lack of self-preservation. Seta spends a good deal of his time traveling the world on one expedition or another. His goal seems to be to find evidence of the ancient turtle civilization that once flourished throughout East Asia.

Seta is also something of an adventurer, and possesses a van that shares his indestructible nature, and apparently has a submarine mode. In the past, Haruka had a major crush on him, though he seemed oblivious. They went on many expeditions together. Along with them on the expeditions was Sara's mother, an American that looked remarkably like Naru, who later died. Her last request was that Seta marry Haruka. This wish was granted, and Haruka and Seta married at the ruins of Todai, capital of the Turtle civilization. Seta is Sara's guardian, and she refers to him as "papa."

Seta is most probably a practitioner of Jeet Kune Do. In most situations, his fighting stance is almost an exact mirror of Bruce Lee's proprietary stance. Also, in the anime, Sara even uses the term "Jeet Kune Do" in reference to her father's fighting technique. In the anime television series, Seta is voiced by Yasunori Matsumoto in Japanese and Kirk Thornton in English.

His name is derived from the name of manga artist Noriyasu Seta.

=== Sarah McDougal ===
Sarah McDougal (サラ・マクドゥガル, Sara MakuDugaru), is a 9-year-old American from California and Seta's adopted daughter. She initially delights in making Keitaro's life miserable, however, like most of the girls in the story, she eventually warms up to him, even if she still calls him a dork.

Sarah is left for a time in the care of the Hinata Inn residents by Seta, as he feels that travelling the world with him on expeditions would be too disruptive to her childhood. There, she develops a close friendship with Su, most likely because of their shared disdain for the general order of things. In both the manga and anime version, Sarah even comments on how "Kaolla and I are not Japanese!" during a meal, when Motoko forces them all – sans Naru, who is in a field trip to Kyoto – to have a samurai-like diet. Sara quickly becomes Su's new playmate, taking the place of Motoko, who was the only person in the house to keep up with Su's energy. Sara and Su eventually become so close they change their hairstyles to match, both of them with two pigtails. Sara eventually does return to travelling with Seta after his marriage to Haruka.

Sarah has an uncle in California; in the anime, it was implied that she had stayed with, and been the victim of abuse, at the hands of her biological relatives. Her mother, now deceased, formerly worked with Seta and Haruka on an archaeological dig and competed for Seta's romantic attention.

Sara possesses no unusual talents or skills, save for a certain gift for Jeet Kune Do learned from Seta, though she is adept at bashing Keitaro on the head with priceless artifacts often pulled out of nowhere. She has a panda-shaped birthmark on her buttocks, which she avoids showing at all costs. She shares her family name with Cynthia McDougal from Ken Akamatsu's previous manga series A.I. Love You. In the anime television series, Sarah is voiced by Yumiko Kobayashi in Japanese and Julie Maddalena in English.

=== Kanako Urashima ===
Kanako Urashima (浦島 可奈子, Urashima Kanako) is Keitaro's adopted younger sister. Kanako is a master of disguise and is able to impersonate anyone, which she uses to try to get control over the Hinata Inn (Keitaro is the only one who can see through her disguise at simple view), and she also has a strong fable and skills in Japanese bondage techniques. Kanako never came to see Keitaro as a brother, and had loved him since they were children. When they promised to run an inn together when they grew up, she had assumed it would be as husband and wife. However, Keitaro does not share these thoughts and only sees her as a sister.

She first appears in Volume 11 of the manga, and in the Love Hina Again OVA. Her appearance is often accompanied by the sound of a bell carried on the tail of her unusual cat Kuro.

After travelling with her grandmother for some years, she returns to Japan to fulfill her promise to her brother to run an inn together. She arrives while Keitaro was away in the United States, and after assuming control, immediately changes the Hinata Inn from a girls' dormitory back into an inn. The residents are forced to either stay and work for her, or to leave.

She soon realizes that all of the girls in Hinata Inn have some sort of affection for her brother, and tests their affection in a variety of ways. She then tries to drive them away by being as mean and cruel as she could to them. At first it seemed to be working, as one by one everyone but Naru left the new Hinata Inn. When the girls (except for Naru) start to suspect Kanako's feelings for Keitaro and why she forces them to be mean to him, they form the "Hinata House Liberation Front" in order to reclaim the Inn. Kanako, Naru and Mutsumi form the Hinata-rōshi (日向浪士, translated as "Hinata Rebel Alliance") to reclaim it under the name Urashima Kanako-no-suke (浦島可奈子之助).

Even without knowing her, Kanako had harbored a deep hatred for the little girl to which Keitaro promised to go to Tokyo University with, as she believes that the promise is what plagued his life with bad luck. As such, she believed that by eliminating this girl, the "curse" would be lifted. At first, she thought that Kitsune, who was leading the "Liberation Front", was this girl, but in the nick of time, Naru ended up revealing that she was most likely the girl. Disheartened for having trusted her unwilling sworn enemy, Kanako attempted to sabotage Naru's relationship with Keitaro upon his return. However, in the end, she recognized that it was Naru whom he liked, and reluctantly accepts their relationship. In the anime television series, Kanako is voiced by Natsuko Kuwatani in Japanese and Melissa Fahn in English.

== Minor characters ==
=== Amalla Su ===
Amalla Su (アマラ・スゥ, Amara Sū) is Kaolla Su's older sister. She has long white hair, blue eyes, and wears an outfit resembling that of an Indian/Arabian princess. Both she and her sister are magical girls, and both are members of the royal family of the kingdom of Molmol. Amalla has been in love with cousin Crown Prince Lamba Lu for a long time, but has never admitted her feelings to him. She speaks Japanese in an Edokko accent, and claims to be from the deserts of Edo (Edo is an old name for Tokyo, which of course has no deserts). In combat, she possesses two weapons: a magical flute that controls the weather, and her pet albino alligator Shiro. She is referenced in the manga and has several appearances in the anime. In the anime television series, Amalla is voiced by Aya Hisakawa in Japanese and Wendee Lee in English.

=== Lamba Lu ===
The "Brother" to Amalla and Kaolla. In reality, he is a cousin of theirs, but they have grown up as siblings. He is the king of their nation, and in the tradition of their people, he has to serve in the military for a period of time. Before that happens, he is required to marry. Once when Kaolla was a very young girl he promised to marry her, but then he realises that she only sees him as a brother, whereas Amalla is in love with him. He marries Amalla instead.

Lamba Lu looks almost exactly like Keitaro when they both have their glasses on; the only striking differences are that he's a bit more tanned than Keitaro is, has darker hair and dark green eyes, and a somewhat Indian/South Asian appearance. Unlike Keitaro, however, Lamba Lu is very calm, collected, and 'together', and not at all clumsy or awkward.

While Lamba Lu does not appear explicitly in the manga, he does interact with Keitaro at one point and has a different role. In volume 14, Keitaro receives a letter from Lamba Lu inviting the former ronin to take part in a joint research project between Tokyo University and the University of Molmol (in which case Lamba Lu is actually the chairman of the joint research project) on the Lost Todai Ruins. In the anime television series, Lamba is voiced by Yūji Ueda in Japanese and Derek Stephen Prince in English.

=== Kentaro Sakata ===
Kentaro Sakata (坂田 健太朗, Sakata Kentarō), an anime-specific character, had a crush on Naru. Originally Keitaro's rival for Narusegawa, he eventually loses all of his money in his pursuit of her. He remained fairly tenacious for a time, but eventually gave up after getting deep into debt with the Hinata Inn. Haruka let him try to work off his debts at a very low pay rate of $1.50 an hour; from that point on, Kentaro became an occasional background character and plot device, like giving advice to Keitaro and supporting his feelings for Narusegawa.

Moreover, Kentaro has been repeatedly mispronounced as 'Keitaro' by the residents, and occasionally by himself, mainly before they grew too familiar with him. Strangely enough though, he has absolutely nothing, besides his original affection for Naru, in common with Keitaro. In the anime television series, Kentaro is voiced by Ryotaro Okiayu in Japanese and Steve Areno in English.

=== Mei Narusegawa ===
Mei Narusegawa (成瀬川 メイ, Narusegawa Mei) is Naru's younger sister. Naru describes her as her "half-sister" in manga volumes 11 and 14. On the other hand, in the anime, episode 22, Mei said "My father married her mother." This leads some to speculate that they are stepsisters, although this is never confirmed. She initially tries to get Keitaro and Mutsumi together in the hopes that Naru would return home if Keitaro were taken. She gives up on this when she and Naru clear up a few family misconceptions. Furthermore, in Love Hina Again, she makes a very brief appearance to help all the Hinata residents about Keitaro and Naru's relationship & help speed it up. She also appears in the last volume of the manga, seen standing off on the side with the rest of the residents of Hinata Inn, while Naru is chasing Keitaro down after accidentally undressing her. She also plays a minor role in the Spring Movie.

Mei was created for and appears primarily in the Love Hina anime, though she is referred to in at least two places in the manga and is seen in the last chapter of the final volume of the manga. In the anime television series, Mei is voiced by Yuri Shiratori in Japanese and Rebecca Forstadt in English.

=== Tsuruko Aoyama ===
Tsuruko Aoyama (青山 鶴子, Aoyama Tsuruko) is Motoko's older sister and the one currently entrusted with the keeping of their family's Shinmeiryuu tradition. She is not active in running the school, having given up the life of the sword for marriage, and it is her duty to hand the school over to Motoko's care when the time comes.

Though Motoko has lived in fear of Tsuruko for years, Tsuruko has Motoko's best interests at heart and her only real wish is for her sister to be happy on whatever path she chooses to walk. Unfortunately, she has a habit of trying to kill her sister when she lies to her (when she tried to take Motoko back to Kyoto and, to prevent this, she pretended to be engaged with Keitaro) or does not tell her the full details of a situation (when Motoko admitted that she flunked the Todai admittance exam). She also enters a bloodthirsty state whenever Motoko is inactive and does not do her best (this is only seen in a nightmare sequence of Motoko).

While her usual appearance is that of a very proper lady well versed in Japanese culture, she sometimes has the eyes of a demon and becomes extremely violent. She is also a skilled swordswoman, even though she abandoned the dojo after getting married. She is depicted a serious and just, whilst also caring deeply for her younger sister, Motoko.

She has a pet crane named "Shippu", which she later gives to Motoko in the thirteenth volume after Motoko finally defeats her. Like her sister, her sword techniques are centered around the destruction of evil, using ki attacks with her slash, some of them hurting only evil beings, but mostly slashing through rocks, people or larger objects (like a sports car, driven by Kentaro, that was 'accidentally' about to run over Keitaro – in the manga, it was a truck whose driver was tired and drunk– with relative ease. In the anime television series, Tsuruko is voiced by Miki Nagasawa in Japanese and Philece Sampler in English.

=== Kimiaki Shirai ===
Kimiaki Shirai (白井 功明, Shirai Kimiaki) is one of Keitaro's friends. He loves to make fun of Keitaro, calling him a failure in girls and academics, but pulls back later on when Keitaro becomes more successful. He almost always appears with Haitani. His main interests are in women, and one of his only upside is some degree of skill in computers. He also seems to have an interest in older woman like Haruka. He is short, and is almost always shown with big round glasses. In the manga's fifth volume, Su even calls him a "small, fat, Hobbit". In the anime television series, Shirai is voiced by Michio Miyashita in Japanese and Gene Holliday in English.

=== Masayuki Haitani ===
Masayuki Haitani (灰谷 真之, Haitani Masayuki) is one of Keitaro's friends, and is (apart from a few physical differences) almost exactly like Shirai. He is taller, wearing tiny round glasses, and enters a university before Shirai or Keitaro. Like Shirai, Haitani's primary interests lie in women, relying on his charm to attract female attention, but to no avail. He appears to be the leader of the trio, formulating many schemes to gain girlfriends for himself, Keitaro, and Shirai (despite Keitaro's reluctance to go along with them), most notably the Hinata tenants, but they end in constant failure, getting them into trouble (if not all three, then only Keitaro) with the girls. In the anime television series, Haitani is voiced by Hiroyuki Yoshino in Japanese and Steven Blum in English.

=== Ema Maeda ===
Ema Maeda (真枝 絵馬, Maeda Ema) appears in the epilogue of the Love Hina manga, Volume 14, which is set three years (four in the English manga) after the end of the main storyline.

A timid 15-year-old girl who dabbles in conspiracy theories, Ema hopes to get into Tokyo University so she can improve her life and have people notice her. Due to her poor grades, she left home in order to live at the "legendary" Hinata Inn, which is believed to have the power to get anyone into Tokyo University. Being very clumsy, her arrival at the Hinata Inn mirrors Keitaro's initial arrival, as she is mistaken for a peeping tom and is chased out of the hot springs. In awe of all the beautiful girls living at the Hinata Inn, she accidentally steals Naru's wedding veil, tripping a theft alarm in the process. She is rescued by and flees with Keitaro. Despite a shaky first day, everything is set right when she is given a thank you kiss by Naru for finding and returning both her veil and groom. She then realizes that she can achieve her dreams if she tries hard enough. She has a pet chameleon named Leon.

=== Nyamo Namo ===
Nyamo Namo (ニャモ・ナーモ, Nyamo Nāmo) is a young girl of the island Pararakelse. Her grandfather was once an acquaintance of Seta, and after her grandfather's death, Nyamo decided to work with Seta on his excavations to continue her grandfather's work. Nyamo is physically almost identical to Shinobu, except for her darker skin and longer hair. She also shares a number of other traits with Shinobu as well, including her extreme initial shyness and reluctance to speak and a crush on Keitaro (which is shown when she glomps Keitaro in her second appearance and for which Naru punches him into the ground for "assaulting" Nyamo). She also seems to have developed a fear of Naru after seeing her bludgeon Keitaro into the air (even hiding behind her giant tortoise when she saw Naru afterwards) though she is also very hard to surprise, often having the same innocent quizzical expression in any situation. Nyamo and Shinobu quickly become good friends and correspond when apart. In the manga, when she visits the Hinata Dorms, she brings with her a pet giant tortoise named Gidget. In the anime television series, Nyamo is voiced by Nana Mizuki in Japanese and Michelle Ruff in English.

=== Ken Akamatsu ===
Ken Akamatsu (赤松 健, Akamatsu Ken) makes brief cameo appearances in the anime television series and Love Hina Specials, serving as a minor plot device character. He is referred to as Akamatsu Sensei, and is voiced by Akamatsu himself.

== Animals/Pets ==
=== Tama-chan ===
Tama (タマ) (in full Onsen Tamago (温泉 たまご; lit. 'Hot Springs Egg') is the turtle given to Keitaro by Mutsumi. Keitaro points out that the turtle is male, but the girls are convinced he is a 'she' and so 'he' is referred to as 'she' throughout the manga. She is an 'onsen kame' or hot-springs turtle, and like others of her species, she can fly. Su, Mutsumi, Seta, and (later in the series) Keitaro appear to have the ability to speak with Tama-chan, and Su occasionally develops the urge to eat her, though sometimes it is just to tease Shinobu (in the manga, it is said on a side note that Su drops this habit in order to wait for Tama-chan to reproduce). She appears in Negima on Chizuru Naba's apron on the back cover of volume 8, in chapter 85 of volume 10, and in other places as pictures. In the anime television series, Tama is voiced by Yukie Maeda in Japanese and Wendee Lee in English.

=== Mecha-Tama-chan ===
Su, convinced she is going to have to face Tama-chan down at some point (Su wants to eat her), has designed multiple mechanical versions of Tama. Every Mecha-Tama has turned out to be dangerous to the residents of the Hinata Inn.

- Mecha-Tama-Chan 0 (a prototype): Volume 11
- Mecha-Tama-chan 1: Volume 5
- Mecha-Tama-chan 2: Volume 5
- Mecha-Tama-chan Mark 3: Volume 7
- Mecha-Tama-chan 4: Volume 8
- Mecha-Tamago 5: Volume 13
- Mecha-Tama-chan 6: Volume 14
- Mecha-Tama-chan 30: Volume 14

Su has been developing Mecha Tama-chans during the three years that have passed since the end of the main story until the marriage of Keitaro and Naru. Kanako Urashima gets ahold of Su's prototype Mecha-Tama in her reign over the house in volume 11, and is the only time someone besides Su used a Mecha-Tama, aside from Naru in volume 7 in her attempt to keep Keitaro and Mutsumi apart.

=== Kuro ===
Kuro (クロ, Kuro lit. Black) is a black cat with huge ears which follows Kanako. It first appears in book 11 of the manga, and in the Love Hina Again OVA. It becomes friends with Tama-chan. Kaolla is very interested in researching it, and Sarah calls him "witch cat" after knowing about Kuro's unusual abilities to fly (using its oversized ears) and talk. In the anime, Kuro can talk, but in the manga, instead of Kuro being able to talk, it is just Kanako's ventriloquism. It carries a bell on its tail, which sounds as characteristic when Kanako appears. As a footnote, Ken Akamatsu explained in his notes in Volume 14, page 148 that Tama, Kuro, Shippu, and Leon were inspired by the "Four Legendary Animals of Japanese Mythology". Tama was inspired by Genbu, Kuro by Byakko, Shippu by Suzaku, and Leon by Seiryuu. In the anime television series, Kuro is voiced by Yuki Matsuoka in Japanese and Sandy Fox in English.
