= Shouta Aoi discography =

Discography

- Studio albums: 4
- EPs: 2
- Soundtrack albums: 43
- Compilation albums: 2
- Singles: 17
- Music videos: 16

The discography of Shouta Aoi consists of four studio albums, two compilation albums, two mini-albums, and seventeen singles. In addition to this, Aoi has released music and drama CDs for characters he has voiced as well as contributing to anime and video game soundtracks.

Aoi debuted as a singer in 2006 with the song "Negaiboshi" and used the stage name Showta until 2009. Afterwards, he began releasing music independently under the pseudonym Noboru Ryugaki. Once he made his voice acting debut in 2011, he restarted his music career and later began releasing songs under the stage name Shouta Aoi, with his current music career separate from his previous. (Note: Official descriptions for Shouta Aoi's discography lists his work released under the name "Showta" as separate from his current work, i.e. while Unlimited is his overall second studio album, it is the first album released under the name "Shouta Aoi" and official descriptions list it as his debut studio album.) Since 2011, Aoi's music has been primarily produced by Elements Garden with his oversight.

== Albums ==
=== Studio albums ===
List of studio albums, with selected chart positions, sales figures and certifications
Title	Album details	Peak chart positions		Sales
Title	Album details	JPN	JPN Hot (Note: The Billboard Japan Hot Albums Charts were launched on June 4, 2015. Chart information for releases prior to that date are unavailable.)	Sales
As Showta
Eve	Released: March 5, 2008; Label: King Records; Formats: CD	115	—	—
As Shouta Aoi
Unlimited	Released: April 22, 2015; Label: B-Green; Formats: CD, digital download	7	7	—
0	Released: October 11, 2017; Label: King Records; Formats: CD, digital download	7	7	JPN: 11,361
Detonator	Released: November 8, 2023; Label: King Records; Formats: CD, digital download	12	15	JPN: 4,047
Limitless	Released: July 1, 2026; Label: King Records; Formats: CD, digital download	29	—	JPN: 2,984
"—" denotes releases that did not chart or were not released in that region.

=== Compilation albums ===
List of compilation albums, with selected chart positions, sales figures and certifications
Title	Year	Album details	Peak chart positions		Sales
Title	Year	Album details	JPN	JPN Hot	Sales
As Showta
Showta Best	2016	Released: July 6, 2016; Label: King Records; Formats: CD, digital download	21	19	4,799
As Shouta Aoi
S	2016	Released: May 18, 2016; Label: B-Green; Formats: CD, digital download	4	4	12,475+

== Extended plays ==
List of extended plays, with selected details and peak chart positions
Title	Year	EP details	Peak chart positions
Title	Year	EP details	JPN
Blue Bird	2013	Released: June 26, 2013; Label: B-Green; Formats: CD, digital download	20
Collage	2024	Released: December 4, 2024; Label: King; Formats: CD, digital download	24

== Singles ==
Title	Year	Peak chart positions			Sales	Album
Title	Year	JPN	JPN Hot (Note: The Billboard Japan Hot 100 Charts were launched on March 3, 2008. Chart information for releases prior to that date are unavailable.)	JPN Ani. (Note: The Billboard Japan Hot Animation Charts were launched on December 1, 2010. Chart information for releases prior to that date are unavailable.)	Sales	Album
As Showta
"Negaiboshi" (願い星)	2006	115	—N/a	—N/a	—	Eve
"Trans-winter (Fuyu no Mukōgawa)" (Trans-winter ～冬のむこう側～)	2006	32	—N/a	—N/a	—	Eve
"Hito Shizuku"	2007	31	—N/a	—N/a	—	Eve
"Kimi ni, Kaze ga Fukimasu You ni" (君に、風が吹きますように)	2007	95	—N/a	—N/a	—	Eve
"Haru na no ni"	2008	90	—N/a	—N/a	—	Eve
"Hikaru no Gen-chan"	2008	140	—	—N/a	—	Showta Best
As Shouta Aoi
"Virginal"	2014	8	22	2	—	Unlimited
"True Hearts"	2014	13	20	7	—	Unlimited
"Himitsu no Kuchizuke"	2014	11	20	3	—	Unlimited
"Murasaki"	2015	6	21	3	—	S
"Zessei Stargate" (絶世スターゲイト)	2016	7	21	1	1,927+	S
"Innocent" (イノセント)	2016	19	31	10	1,639+	Zero
"DDD"	2016	11	34	7	1,507+	Zero
"Flower"	2017	11	34	6	1,549+	Zero
"Eclipse"	2018	7	18	6	1,886+	TBA
"Tone"	2019	10	23	4	1,819+	TBA
"Harmony"	2019	6	73	12	8,502 (Phy.)	TBA
"BAD END"	2020	8	—	14	2,913+	TBA
"Give me love me"	2021	16	—	—	4,295 (Phy.)	TBA
"—" denotes releases that did not chart or were not released in that region.

== Soundtrack ==
=== Guest appearances ===
List of non-single guest appearances, with other performing artists, showing year released and album name
Title	Year	Other artists	Album
As Showta
"Ekubo" (えくぼ)	2009	None	Kanna-san Daiseikō Desu! the Movie: Premium Edition
As Shouta Aoi
"Ai no Sasameki Goto" (愛のささめきごと)	2011	None	Sangokushi Lovers Drama CD 1
"Sora"	2012	None	Kimi to Boku 5 (limited edition)
"Graffiti"	2012	None	Kimi to Boku 5 (limited edition)
"Tomorrow"	2012	None	Kimi to Boku 5 (limited edition)
"Gekka no Hana" (月下の華)	2012	None	Ikemen Ooku Drama CD
"Soul Phrase"	2014	Maho Tomita, Genki Okawa, Yuki Fujiwara, Asami Tano, and Marina Tanoue	Persona 3: The Weird Masquerade: Graduation
"Kimi no Kioku"	2014	Maho Tomita, Genki Okawa, Yuki Fujiwara, Asami Tano, and Marina Tanoue	Persona 3: The Weird Masquerade: Graduation
"Burn My Dread"	2014	None	Persona 3: The Weird Masquerade: Graduation
"Touch My Heartstrings"	2014	ZAQ	Persona 3: The Weird Masquerade: Graduation
"Glitter Wish"	2014	None	None
"Tenshi no Inori" (天使の祈り)	2015	None	Unlimited
"Kimi no Kotoba" (汝の言霊)	2015	None	S
"Endless Song"	2015	None	None
"Pride (Louis ver.)"	2016	None	King of Prism by Pretty Rhythm: Song & Soundtrack
"Crazy Gonna Crazy"	2017	Junta Terashima	King of Prism: Pride the Hero Song & Soundtrack
"Lunatic Destiny"	2017	None	King of Prism: Pride the Hero Song & Soundtrack
"Poppy Pappy Day (Shouta Aoi ver.)"	2018	None	Pop Team Epic: All Time Best
"Gift (Louis ver.)"	2019	None	None

=== Character singles ===
Title	Year	Peak chart positions		Character
Title	Year	JPN		Character
Title	Year	Oricon	Hot 100	Character
"Open Your Mind"	2014	23	—	Wandering Bard Elta (Rage of Bahamut)
"A.I" (Note: The single is titled Uta no Prince-sama: Idol Song: Ai Mikaze (A.I) (うたの☆プリンスさまっ♪アイドルソング 美風 藍(A.I)), but the A-side is titled "A.I.")	2014	4	6	Ai Mikaze (Uta no Prince-sama: All Star After Secret)
"Boku-tachi no Revolution" (僕たちのRevolution)	2014	50	—	Daiki Tomii (Shōnen Hollywood: Holly Stage for 49)
"Loop Slider Cider" (Note: The single is titled Ranran Tries Singing "Loop Slider Cider" (蘭々が「Loop Slider Cider」歌ってみた), but the song is titled "Loop Slider Cider.")	2015	42	—	Ranran Kurumiya (Happy Sugar Darlin)
"Innocent Wind" (Note: The single is titled Uta no Prince-sama: Idol Song: Ai Mikaze (Innocent Wind) (うたの☆プリンスさまっ♪アイドルソング 美風 藍(Innocent Wind)), but the A-side is titled "Innocent Wind.")	2015	9	15	Ai Mikaze (Uta no Prince-sama: Maji Love Revolution)
"Fight Like Dancing!" (Note: The single is titled Kenka Bancho Otome Character Song CD Vol.2: "Fight Like Dancing!" (喧嘩番長 乙女 キャラクターソングCD Vol.2「Fight Like Dancing!」), but the song is titled "Fight Like Dancing!")	2015	178	—	Takayuki Konparu (Kenka Bancho Otome)
"Win Glory" (Note: The single is titled TV Anime Ace of Diamond Character Song Series Vol. 13: Hideaki Tōjō: "Win Glory" (TVアニメ「ダイヤのA」キャラクターソングシリーズVOL.13 東条秀明 "WIN GLORY"), but the song is titled "Win Glory.")	2015	93	—	Hideaki Tōjō (Ace of Diamond)
"Milky Star Ranran ver." (Note: The single is titled Try Singing One More Time Series: Ranran Tries Singing "Milky Star": Ranran Kurumiya (もういちど歌ってみたシリーズ 蘭々が「Milky Star」歌ってみた 来宮蘭々), but the song is titled "Milky Star Ranran ver.")	2015	90	—	Ranran Kurumiya (Kare to Futari de Torokeru)
"Mogitate Resuka!" (もぎたて☆レスカ!) (Note: The single is titled Sendo 100% Tries Singing CD: "Mogitate Resuka!" Ruka (鮮度100%の歌ってみたCD「もぎたて☆レスカ!」ルカ), but the song is titled "Loop Slider Cider.")	2016	154	—	Ruka (Fresh Kiss 100%)
"Natsu no Yakusoku Ranran ver." (夏の約束 蘭々 ver.) (Note: The single is titled Try Singing One More Time Series Encore: Ranran Tries Singing "Natsu no Yakusoku": Ranran Kurumiya (もういちど歌ってみたシリーズ アンコール 蘭々が「夏の約束」歌ってみた 来宮蘭々), but the song is titled "Natsu no Yakusoku.")	2016	123	—	Ranran Kurumiya (Kare to Futari de Torokeru)
Solo-kyun! Songs vol.5: Monet Tsukushi (TVアニメ「マジきゅんっ!ルネッサンス」Solo-kyun!Songs vol.5 土筆もね)	2016	38	—	Monet Tsukushi (Magic-kyun! Renaissance)
"—" denotes releases that did not chart or were not released in that region.

==== Participating singles ====
List of participating character songs, with other performing artists, showing year released and album name
Title	Year	Peak chart positions		Sales	Other artist(s)	Album
Title	Year	JPN		Sales	Other artist(s)	Album
Title	Year	Oricon	Hot 100	Sales	Other artist(s)	Album
"Evolution Eve" (エボリューション・イヴ)	2015	3	3	—	Tatsuhisa Suzuki, Showtaro Morikubo, and Tomoaki Maeno (as Quartet Night)	Non-album single
"God's S.T.A.R."	2016	1	3	108,000+	Tatsuhisa Suzuki, Showtaro Morikubo, and Tomoaki Maeno (as Quartet Night)	Non-album single
"Prince Night (Doko ni Ita no sa!? My Princess)" (Prince Night～どこにいたのさ!? MY PRINCESS～)	2017	19	—	—	Keisuke Ueda, Yūya Asato, Yūto Adachi, and Daisuke Hirose (as P4 with T)	Non-album single
"Fly to the Future"	2018	2	2	174,889+	Tatsuhisa Suzuki, Showtaro Morikubo, and Tomoaki Maeno (as Quartet Night)	Non-album single
"Tomodachi Ijō × Teki Miman" (友達 以上×敵 未満)	2019	78	—	—	Keisuke Ueda, Yūya Asato, Yūto Adachi, and Daisuke Hirose (as P4 with T)	Non-album single
"Secret Scarlet ~Yume Live Touji & Shion" (Secret Scarlet ~ゆめライブ 藤次&紫)	2019	-	—	—	Toshiyuki Toyonaga, (as Toiji Harimiya and Shion Mikekado from DREAM!ing)	Non-album single
"—" denotes releases that did not chart or were not released in that region.

=== Character albums ===
Title	Year	Peak chart positions	Character
Title	Year	JPN Oricon	Character
Tsukiuta: June: Rui Minazuki: "Rainy Moment" (ツキウタ。6月 水無月涙 「Rainy Moment」)	2013	43	Rui Minazuki (Tsukiuta)
Sengoku Soine Series Vol. 3: Ishida Mitsunari version (戦国添い寝シリーズVol.3 石田三成編)	2013	129	Ishida Mitsunari (Sengoku Soine)
Ginga Idol Cho Kareshi Character Song Zoku: Dosei no Chizane Okawari! (銀河アイドル超カレシキャラクターソング 続・土星のチザネおかわり!)	2014	—	Chizane (Ginga Idol Cho Kareshi)
Kare to Futari de Torokeru CD: Happy Sugar Darlin' 3rd: Ranran (カレとふたりでトロけるCD「√HAPPY+SUGAR=DARLIN」3rd 蘭々)	2014	35	Ranran Kurumiya (Happy Sugar Darlin')
Idol to Futari de Torokeru CD: Happy Sugar Idol 2nd: Ranran (アイドルとふたりでトロけるCD 「√HAPPY+SUGAR=IDOL」 2nd 蘭々)	2015	52	Ranran Kurumiya (Happy Sugar Idol)
Sendo 100% no Kiss CD: "Fresh Kiss 100%" 3rd Twinkle: Ruka (鮮度100%のキスCD「FRESH KISS 100%」3rd Twinkle ルカ)	2016	137	Ruka (Fresh Kiss 100%)
Moso Kareshi: Koakuma Pet-kun (妄想彼氏—小悪魔ペットくん—)	2016	144	Kuro (Moso Kareshi)
Idol wo Hitorijime Suru CD "Happy Sugar Vacation" 2nd: Ranran (アイドルを独り占めするCD「√HAPPY+SUGAR=VACATION」2nd 蘭々)	2016	131	Ranran Kurumiya (Happy Sugar Vacation)
Dynamic Chord Love U Kiss Series vol. 16: Nal	2017	131	Nal (Dynamic Chord)
Heiko Sekai to Hakoniwa Heya vol. 4 (並行世界と箱庭の部屋vol.4)	2017	—	Asanaga Shijyo, Osamu Shijyo (Heiko Sekai to Hakoniwa Heya)
Blackish House Alone with U Series vol. 8: Sera	2017	—	Sera (Blackish House)
Otodoke Kareshi vol. 5: Haruka Hinata (おとどけカレシ Vol.5 陽向 遥)	2017	110	Haruka Hinata (Otodoke Kareshi)
Otodoke Kareshi: More Love vol. 7: Haruka Hinata (おとどけカレシ -More Love- Vol.7 陽向 遥)	2018	103	Haruka Hinata (Otodoke Kareshi)
Yozora no Kagayaku Idol to Futarikiri de Sugosu CD: "Marginal #4 Starry Lover" vol. 7: Tsubasa (夜空に輝く星(アイドル)とふたりきりで過ごすCD「MARGINAL#4 Starry Lover」Vol.7 ツバサ)	2018	116	Tsubasa (Marginal Lover)
Twinkle Star	2018	—	Shoutan (Shouta Aoi × Little Twin Stars)

== Other songs ==
Title	Year	Album
As Noboru Ryugaki
"Oji-sama to Cheek" (おじさまとチーク) (Kenzo Saeki and Boogie the Mach Motors feat. Noboru Ryugaki)	2010	21 Seiki-san sings Harlmens

== Videography ==
=== Music videos ===
Title	Year	Director	Ref.
As Showta
"Negaiboshi"	2006	—	
"Trans-winter: Fuyu no Mukōgawa"	2006	—	
"Hito Shizuku"	2007	—	
"Kimi ni, Kaze ga Fukimasu You ni"	2007	—	
"Haru na no ni"	2008	—	
As Shouta Aoi
"Blue Bird"	2013	—	
"Virginal"	2014	—	
"True Hearts"	2014	—	
"Himitsu no Kuchizuke"	2014	—	
"Unlimited"	2015	—	
"Murasaki"	2015	—	
"Zessei Stargate"	2016	—	
"Innocent"	2016	—	
"DDD"	2016	—	
"Flower"	2017	Nozomi Tanaka	
"Zero"	2017	Nozomi Tanaka	
"Eclipse"	2018	—	
"Tone"	2019	—	
"Harmony"	2019	—	
"BAD END"	2020	—	
