= Uta no Prince-sama discography =

- Studio albums: 0
- EPs: 1
- Soundtrack albums: 3
- Compilation albums: 7
- Singles: 59
- Drama: 25
- Radio: 5

Uta no Prince-sama is an otome game media franchise centered on the fictional Japanese idol boy band STARISH (stylized as ST☆RISH), starting with the release of the first game in 2010. Music for the series is managed by B-Green for the games and King Records for the anime. All songs in the franchise were produced by Elements Garden. All music released is credited under the characters' names.

The voice actors for STARISH consist of Takuma Terashima as Otoya Ittoki, Mamoru Miyano as Tokiya Ichinose, Junichi Suwabe as Ren Jinguji, Kenichi Suzumura as Masato Hijirikawa, Kisho Taniyama as Natsuki Shinomiya, and Hiro Shimono as Syo Kurusu. Kohsuke Toriumi, who plays as Cecil Aijima, was included in the group starting from the second season of the anime and the game Uta no Prince-sama: Debut.

The game Uta no Prince-sama: All Star and the second season of the anime series, Uta no Prince-sama: Maji Love 2000%, introduced a rival idol group, Quartet Night (stylized as QUARTET NIGHT), with the characters voiced by Tatsuhisa Suzuki as Ranmaru Kurosaki, Shouta Aoi as Ai Mikaze, Showtaro Morikubo as Reiji Kotobuki, and Tomoaki Maeno as Camus. STARISH and Quartet Night have performed as two subgroups: Day Dream, consisting of Otoya (Terashima), Natsuki (Taniyama), Ren (Suwabe), Syo (Shimono), Reiji (Morikubo), and Ranmaru (Suzuki); and Night Dream, consisting of Tokiya (Miyano), Masato (Suzumura), Cecil (Toriumi), Ai (Aoi), and Camus (Maeno).

A third group, HEAVENS (stylized as HE★VENS), was introduced beginning with the second season of the anime series, consisting of Hikaru Midorikawa as Eiichi Otori, Daisuke Ono as Kira Sumeragi, Tsubasa Yonaga as Nagi Mikado, Ryōhei Kimura as Yamato Hyuga, Yuma Uchida as Eiji Otori, Hidenori Takahashi as Van Kiryuin, and Daiki Yamashita as Shion Amakusa.

== Albums ==
=== Extended plays ===
List of extended plays, with selected chart positions, sales figures and certifications
Title	Year	Album details	Peak chart positions		Sales
Title	Year	Album details	JPN Oricon	JPN Hot	Sales
Heavens (Ryōhei Kimura, Hikaru Midorikawa, Hidenori Takahashi, Yuuma Uchida, Daiki Yamashita, Tsubasa Yonaga, and Daisuke Ono)
Anthem of the Angel (アンセム フォー ジ エンジェル)	2019	Released: March 13, 2019; Label: King Records; Formats: CD	7	20	TBA
"—" denotes releases that did not chart or were not released in that region.

=== Compilation albums ===
List of compilation albums, with selected chart positions, sales figures and certifications
Title	Year	Album details	Peak chart positions		Sales
Title	Year	Album details	JPN Oricon	JPN Hot	Sales
Uta no Prince-sama: Solo Best Album: Otoya Ittoki "I am Here" (うたの☆プリンスさまっ♪ソロベストアルバム 一十木音也「I am Here.」) (Takuma Terashima)	2019	Released: June 5, 2019; Label: B-Green; Formats: CD	4		TBA
Uta no Prince-sama: Solo Best Album: Masato Hijirikawa "Holy Knight" (うたの☆プリンスさまっ♪ソロベストアルバム 聖川真斗「HOLY KNIGHT」) (Kenichi Suzumura)	2019	Released: July 3, 2019; Label: B-Green; Formats: CD	6		TBA
Uta no Prince-sama: Solo Best Album: Natsuki Shinomiya "Suki x Suki Hanamaru!" (うたの☆プリンスさまっ♪ソロベストアルバム 四ノ宮那月「SUKI×SUKIはなまる!」) (Kisho Taniyama)	2019	Released: August 7, 2019; Label: B-Green; Formats: CD	5		TBA
Uta no Prince-sama: Solo Best Album: Tokiya Ichinose "Target is You" (うたの☆プリンスさまっ♪ソロベストアルバム 一ノ瀬トキヤ「Target is you!」) (Mamoru Miyano)	2019	Released: September 4, 2019; Label: B-Green; Formats: CD	3		TBA
Uta no Prince-sama: Solo Best Album: Ren Jinguji "Rose Rose Romance" (うたの☆プリンスさまっ♪ソロベストアルバム 神宮寺レン「Rose Rose Romance」) (Junichi Suwabe)	2019	Released: October 2, 2019; Label: B-Green; Formats: CD	2		TBA
Uta no Prince-sama: Solo Best Album: Syo Kurusu "Sweet Kiss" (うたの☆プリンスさまっ♪ソロベストアルバム 来栖翔「Sweet Kiss」) (Hiro Shimono)	2019	Released: November 6, 2019; Label: B-Green; Formats: CD	1		TBA
Uta no Prince-sama: Solo Best Album: Cecil Aijima "Light Night" (うたの☆プリンスさまっ♪ソロベストアルバム 愛島セシル「☆light ☆night」) (Kohsuke Toriumi)	2019	Released: December 4, 2019; Label: B-Green; Formats: CD	4		TBA
"—" denotes releases that did not chart or were not released in that region.

=== Soundtrack albums ===
List of soundtrack albums, with selected chart positions, sales figures and certifications
Title	Year	Album details	Peak chart positions		Sales
Title	Year	Album details	JPN		Sales
Title	Year	Album details	Oricon	Billboard Japan	Sales
Sound no Prince-sama (サウンドの☆プリンスさまっ♪)	2010	Released: June 30, 2010; Label: B-Green; Formats: CD	138	—	—
Uta no Prince-sama: AA Disc (うたの☆プリンスさまっ♪AAディスク)	2010	Released: December 8, 2010; Label: B-Green; Formats: CD	135	—	—
Uta no Prince-sama: SS Disc (うたの☆プリンスさまっ♪SSディスク)	2011	Released: February 9, 2011; Label: B-Green; Formats: CD	135	—	—
"—" denotes releases that did not chart or were not released in that region.

=== Drama CD albums ===
List of drama CD albums, with selected chart positions, sales figures and certifications
Title	Year	Album details	Peak chart positions		Sales
Title	Year	Album details	JPN		Sales
Title	Year	Album details	Oricon	Billboard Japan	Sales
Uta no Prince-sama: Drama CD 1 (うたの☆プリンスさまっ♪ ドラマCD1)	2010	Released: January 13, 2010; Label: Broccoli; Formats: CD	176	—	—
Uta no Prince-sama: Character Drama CD: Otoya & Tokiya (うたの☆プリンスさまっ♪ キャラクタードラマCD 音也&トキヤ)	2010	Released: March 31, 2010; Label: Broccoli; Formats: CD	176	—	—
Uta no Prince-sama: Character Drama CD: Masato & Ren (うたの☆プリンスさまっ♪ キャラクタードラマCD 真斗&レン)	2010	Released: April 28, 2010; Label: Broccoli; Formats: CD	187	—	—
Uta no Prince-sama: Character Drama CD: Natsuki & Syo (うたの☆プリンスさまっ♪ キャラクタードラマCD 那月&翔)	2010	Released: May 26, 2010; Label: Broccoli; Formats: CD	181	—	—
Uta no Prince-sama: Whisper CD: Sweet Holiday (うたの☆プリンスさまっ♪ささやきCD ～Sweet Holiday～)	2010	Released: August 25, 2010; Label: B-Green; Formats: CD	117	—	—
Uta no Prince-sama: Duet Drama CD: Natsuki & Syo (うたの☆プリンスさまっ♪ デュエットドラマCD 那月&翔)	2010	Released: December 22, 2010; Label: B-Green; Formats: CD	129	—	—
Uta no Prince-sama: Duet Drama CD: Masato & Ren (うたの☆プリンスさまっ♪ デュエットドラマCD 真斗&レン)	2011	Released: February 2, 2011; Label: B-Green; Formats: CD	78	—	—
Uta no Prince-sama: Duet Drama CD: Otoya & Tokiya (うたの☆プリンスさまっ♪ デュエットドラマCD 音也&トキヤ)	2011	Released: February 23, 2011; Label: B-Green; Formats: CD	75	—	—
Uta no Prince-sama: Shuffle Unit CD: Reiji & Otoya (うたの☆プリンスさまっ♪ シャッフルユニットCD 嶺二&音也)	2012	Released: November 14, 2012; Label: B-Green; Formats: CD	75	—	—
Uta no Prince-sama: Shuffle Unit CD: Ranmaru & Cecil (うたの☆プリンスさまっ♪ シャッフルユニットCD 蘭丸&セシル)	2012	Released: December 10, 2012; Label: B-Green; Formats: CD	11	—	—
Uta no Prince-sama: Shuffle Unit CD: Ai & Masato & Syo (うたの☆プリンスさまっ♪ シャッフルユニットCD 藍&真斗&翔)	2012	Released: December 12, 2012; Label: B-Green; Formats: CD	12	—	—
Uta no Prince-sama: Shuffle Unit CD: Camus & Ren (うたの☆プリンスさまっ♪ シャッフルユニットCD カミュ&レン)	2012	Released: December 26, 2012; Label: B-Green; Formats: CD	7	—	—
Uta no Prince-sama: Shuffle Unit CD: Natsuki & Tokiya (うたの☆プリンスさまっ♪ シャッフルユニットCD 那月&トキヤ)	2012	Released: January 9, 2013; Label: B-Green; Formats: CD	2	—	—
Uta no Prince-sama: "Heaven Sky" Episode CD (うたの☆プリンスさまっ♪「HEAVEN SKY」エピソードCD) (Heavens)	2012	Released: November 1, 2017; Label: B-Green; Formats: CD	8	—	—
Uta no Prince-sama: Duet Drama CD: "Fiction" Reiji & Ai (うたの☆プリンスさまっ♪デュエットドラマCD「Fiction」嶺二&藍) (Showtaro Morikubo and Shouta Aoi)	2018	Released: October 17, 2018; Label: B-Green; Formats: CD	2	—	—
Uta no Prince-sama: Duet Drama CD: "Non-fiction" Ranmaru & Camus (うたの☆プリンスさまっ♪デュエットドラマCD「Non-Fiction」蘭丸&カミュ) (Tatsuhisa Suzuki and Tomoaki Maeno)	2018	Released: October 17, 2018; Label: B-Green; Formats: CD	3	—	—
"—" denotes releases that did not chart or were not released in that region.

=== Radio show albums ===
List of radio show albums, with selected chart positions, sales figures and certifications
Title	Year	Album details	Peak chart positions		Sales
Title	Year	Album details	JPN		Sales
Title	Year	Album details	Oricon	Billboard Japan	Sales
DJ CD: Suzumura & Shimono no Kiss yori Sugoi: UtaPri Hoso Jitsu vol. 1 (DJCD「鈴村&下野のキスよりすごい うた☆プリ放送室」第1巻)	2010	Released: October 27, 2010; Label: Frontier Works; Formats: CD	—	—	—
Omae no Heart wo Ai de Atatamete Ageru Fuyu no DJ CD: Suzumura & Shimono no Kiss yori Sugoi: UtaPri Hoso Jitsu (お前のハートを愛で温めてあげる冬のDJCD「鈴村&下野のキスよりすごい うた☆プリ放送室」)	2012	Released: January 25, 2012; Label: Frontier Works; Formats: CD	75	—	—
DJ CD: Suzumura & Shimono no Tomo ni Ai o Kanaderu: UtaPri Hoso Jitsu Debut Vol. 1 (DJCD「鈴村&下野の共に愛を奏でる うた☆プリ放送室Debut」Vol.1)	2012	Released: April 25, 2012; Label: Frontier Works; Formats: CD	75	—	—
Kimi ni Sasageru Ai no DJ CD: Suzumura & Shimono no Futari demo UtaPri Hoso Kyoku All Star Vol. 1 (君に捧げる愛のDJCD「鈴村&下野の2人でも うた☆プリ放送局All Star」Vol.1)	2013	Released: January 30, 2013; Label: Frontier Works; Formats: CD	199	—	—
DJ CD-ROM: Suzumura & Shimono no UtaPri Hoso Kyoku Memorial Box (DJCD-ROM「鈴村&下野のうた☆プリ放送局」MEMORIAL BOX)	2018	Released: September 28, 2018; Label: Frontier Works; Formats: CD	43	—	—
"—" denotes releases that did not chart or were not released in that region.

=== Musical theatre albums ===
List of drama CD albums, with selected chart positions, sales figures and certifications
Title	Year	Album details	Peak chart positions		Sales
Title	Year	Album details	JPN		Sales
Title	Year	Album details	Oricon	Billboard Japan	Sales
Uta no Prince-sama: Gekidan Shining: Masquerade Mirage (うたの☆プリンスさまっ♪ 劇団シャイニング マスカレイドミラージュ)	2013	Released: December 25, 2013; Label: B-Green; Formats: CD	2	—	—
Uta no Prince-sama: Gekidan Shining: Tenka Muteki no Shinobu Michi (うたの☆プリンスさまっ♪ 劇団シャイニング 天下無敵の忍び道)	2014	Released: January 29, 2014; Label: B-Green; Formats: CD	2	—	—
Uta no Prince-sama: Gekidan Shining: Joker Trap (うたの☆プリンスさまっ♪ 劇団シャイニング 天下無敵の忍び道)	2014	Released: February 26, 2014; Label: B-Green; Formats: CD	2	—	—
Uta no Prince-sama: Theatre Shining: Bloody Shadows (うたの☆プリンスさまっ♪シアターシャイニング BLOODY SHADOWS)	2015	Released: November 18, 2015; Label: B-Green; Formats: CD	2	—	—
Uta no Prince-sama: Theatre Shining: Pirates of the Frontier (うたの☆プリンスさまっ♪シアターシャイニング Pirates of the Frontier)	2015	Released: December 9, 2015; Label: B-Green; Formats: CD	7	—	—
Uta no Prince-sama: Theatre Shining: Everybuddy! (うたの☆プリンスさまっ♪シアターシャイニング エヴリィBuddy!)	2015	Released: December 23, 2015; Label: B-Green; Formats: CD	4	—	—
Uta no Prince-sama: Shining Masterpiece Show: Lost Alice (うたの☆プリンスさまっ♪Shining Masterpiece Show Lost Alice)	2018	Released: January 17, 2018; Label: B-Green; Formats: CD	5	—	27,020+
Uta no Prince-sama: Shining Masterpiece Show: Trois: Ken to Kizuna no Monogatari (うたの☆プリンスさまっ♪Shining Masterpiece Show トロワ-剣と絆の物語-)	2018	Released: February 7, 2018; Label: B-Green; Formats: CD	4	—	—
Uta no Prince-sama: Shining Masterpiece Show: The Forest of Lycoris (うたの☆プリンスさまっ♪Shining Masterpiece Show リコリスの森)	2018	Released: February 28, 2018; Label: B-Green; Formats: CD	2	—	—
"—" denotes releases that did not chart or were not released in that region.

== Singles ==
Title	Year	Peak chart positions			Sales	Album	Certifications
Title	Year	JPN Oricon	JPN Hot	JPN Ani	Sales	Album	Certifications
STARISH (Takuma Terashima, Mamoru Miyano, Junichi Suwabe, Kenichi Suzumura, Kisho Taniyama, Hiro Shimono, and Kohsuke Toriumi (Note: Kohsuke Toriumi, who plays Cecil Aijima, is not included in STARISH's releases until 2013 onwards.))
"Maji Love 1000%"	2011	7	20	1	54,000	Non-album single	—
"Maji Love 2000%" (マジLOVE2000%)	2013	3	5	1	—	Non-album single	—
"Maji Love Revolutions" (マジLOVEレボリューションズ)	2015	3	1	1	—	Non-album single	—
"Maji Love Legend Star" (マジLOVEレジェンドスター)	2016	7	14	4	3,957	Non-album single	—
"Ultra Blast"	2018	2	3	1	137,504	Non-album single	RIAJ: Gold
Quartet Night (Tatsuhisa Suzuki, Shouta Aoi, Showtaro Morikubo, and Tomoaki Maeno)
Uta no Prince-sama: Quartet Night Idol Song (うたの☆プリンスさまっ♪カルテットアイドルソング)	2014	3	—	—	—	Non-album single	—
"Evolution Eve" (エボリューション・イヴ)	2015	3	3	1	39,000	Non-album single	—
"God's S.T.A.R."	2016	1	3	1	108,000	Non-album single	RIAJ: Gold
"Fly to the Future"	2018	2	2	1	174,889	Non-album single	RIAJ: Gold
Heavens (Ryōhei Kimura, Hikaru Midorikawa, Hidenori Takahashi, Yuma Uchida, Daiki Yamashita, Tsubasa Yonaga, and Daisuke Ono)
"Fumetsu no Inferno" (不滅のインフェルノ)	2017	4	23	4	1,863	Non-album single	—
"Ai o Sasage yo (The Secret Shangri-La)" (愛を捧げよ ～the secret Shangri-la～)	2019	12	51	6	—	Non-album single	—
Collaborations
Uta no Prince-sama: Shining All Star CD (うたの☆プリンスさまっ♪Shining All Star CD)	2012	5	—	—	—	Non-album single	—
Uta no Prince-sama: Shining All Star CD 2 (うたの☆プリンスさまっ♪Shining All Star CD2)	2015	5	—	—	—	Non-album single	—
Uta no Prince-sama: Shining Dream CD (うたの☆プリンスさまっ♪Shining Dream CD) (Day Dream and Night Dream)	2016	3	—	—		Non-album single	—
Uta no Prince-sama: Shining Live Theme Song CD (うたの☆プリンスさまっ♪ Shining Live テーマソングCD)	2017	3	—	—	—	Non-album single	—
"Setsugetsuka" (雪月花)	2018	3	4	1	72,345	Non-album single	—
Uta no Prince-sama: Shining Live Theme Song CD 2 (うたの☆プリンスさまっ♪ Shining Live テーマソングCD2)	2019	5	—	—	—	Non-album single	—
"—" denotes releases that did not chart or were not released in that region.

=== Character singles ===
Title	Year	Peak chart positions	Sales	Album
Title	Year	JPN Oricon	Sales	Album
Uta no Prince-sama: Audition Song 1 (うたの☆プリンスさまっ♪ オーディションソング1) (Takuma Terashima and Mamoru Miyano)	2009	78	—	—
Uta no Prince-sama: Audition Song 2 (うたの☆プリンスさまっ♪ オーディションソング2) (Kenichi Suzumura and Junichi Suwabe)	2010	47	—	—
Uta no Prince-sama: Audition Song 3 (うたの☆プリンスさまっ♪ オーディションソング3) (Kisho Taniyama and Hiro Shimono)	2010	60	—	—
Uta no Prince-sama: Audition Song 4 (うたの☆プリンスさまっ♪ オーディションソング4) (Takuma Terashima, Kenichi Suzumura, and Kisho Taniyama)	2010	56	—	—
Uta no Prince-sama: Happy Love Song 1 (うたの☆プリンスさまっ♪ ハッピーラブソング1) (Takuma Terashima and Mamoru Miyano)	2010	40	—	—
Uta no Prince-sama: Happy Love Song 2 (うたの☆プリンスさまっ♪ハッピーラブソング2) (Kenichi Suzumura and Junichi Suwabe)	2010	50	—	—
Uta no Prince-sama: Happy Love Song 3 (うたの☆プリンスさまっ♪ ハッピーラブソング3) (Kisho Taniyama and Hiro Shimono)	2010	46	—	—
Uta no Prince-sama: Maji Love 1000%: Idol Song: Otoya Ittoki (うたの☆プリンスさまっ♪マジLOVE1000%アイドルソング 一十木音也) (Takuma Terashima)	2011	23	—	—
Uta no Prince-sama: Maji Love 1000%: Idol Song: Masato Hijirikawa (うたの☆プリンスさまっ♪マジLOVE1000%アイドルソング 聖川真斗) (Kenichi Suzumura)	2011	17	—	—
Uta no Prince-sama: Maji Love 1000%: Idol Song: Ren Jinguji (うたの☆プリンスさまっ♪マジLOVE1000%アイドルソング 神宮寺レン) (Junichi Suwabe)	2011	22	—	—
Uta no Prince-sama: Maji Love 1000%: Idol Song: Syo Kurusu (うたの☆プリンスさまっ♪マジLOVE1000%アイドルソング 来栖翔) (Hiro Shimono)	2011	17	—	—
Uta no Prince-sama: Maji Love 1000%: Idol Song: Natsuki Shinomiya (うたの☆プリンスさまっ♪マジLOVE1000%アイドルソング 四ノ宮那月) (Kisho Taniyama)	2011	10	—	—
Uta no Prince-sama: Maji Love 1000%: Idol Song: Tokiya Ichinose (うたの☆プリンスさまっ♪マジLOVE1000%アイドルソング 一ノ瀬トキヤ) (Mamoru Miyano)	2011	7	—	—
Uta no Prince-sama: Maji Love 1000%: Idol Song: Cecil Aijima (うたの☆プリンスさまっ♪マジLOVE1000%アイドルソング 愛島セシル) (Kohsuke Toriumi)	2011	13	—	—
Uta no Prince-sama: Idol Song: Reiji & Ai (うたの☆プリンスさまっ♪ アイドルソング 嶺二&藍) (Showtaro Morikubo and Shouta Aoi)	2012	9	—	—
Uta no Prince-sama: Idol Song: Ranmaru & Camus (うたの☆プリンスさまっ♪ アイドルソング 蘭丸&カミュ) (Tatsuhisa Suzuki and Tomoaki Maeno)	2012	9	—	—
Uta no Prince-sama: Duet CD: Reiji & Ai / Ranmaru & Camus (うたの☆プリンスさまっ♪ デュエットCD 嶺二&蘭丸/藍&カミュ) (Showtaro Morikubo, Tatsuhisa Suzuki, Shouta Aoi, and Tomoaki Maeno)	2012	4	—	—
Uta no Prince-sama: Maji Love 2000%: Idol Song: Syo Kurusu (うたの☆プリンスさまっ♪マジLOVE2000% アイドルソング 来栖 翔) (Hiro Shimono)	2013	4	—	—
Uta no Prince-sama: Maji Love 2000%: Idol Song: Masato Hijirikawa (うたの☆プリンスさまっ♪マジLOVE2000% アイドルソング 聖川真斗) (Kenichi Suzumura)	2013	2	—	—
Uta no Prince-sama: Maji Love 2000%: Idol Song: Otoya Ittoki (うたの☆プリンスさまっ♪マジLOVE2000% アイドルソング 一十木音也) (Takuma Terashima)	2013	4	—	—
Uta no Prince-sama: Maji Love 2000%: Idol Song: Ren Jinguji (うたの☆プリンスさまっ♪マジLOVE2000% アイドルソング 神宮寺レン) (Junichi Suwabe)	2013	5	—	—
Uta no Prince-sama: Maji Love 2000%: Idol Song: Natsuki Shinomiya (うたの☆プリンスさまっ♪マジLOVE2000% アイドルソング 四ノ宮那月) (Kisho Taniyama)	2013	5	—	—
Uta no Prince-sama: Maji Love 2000%: Idol Song: Cecil Aijima (うたの☆プリンスさまっ♪マジLOVE2000% アイドルソング 愛島セシル) (Kohsuke Toriumi)	2013	8	—	—
Uta no Prince-sama: Maji Love 2000%: Idol Song: Tokiya Ichinose (うたの☆プリンスさまっ♪マジLOVE2000% アイドルソング 一ノ瀬トキヤ) (Mamoru Miyano)	2013	5	—	—
Uta no Prince-sama: Idol Song: Reiji Kotobuki (うたの☆プリンスさまっ♪アイドルソング 寿 嶺二) (Showtaro Morikubo)	2014	3	—	—
Uta no Prince-sama: Idol Song: Ranmaru Kurosaki (うたの☆プリンスさまっ♪アイドルソング 黒崎蘭丸) (Tatsuhisa Suzuki)	2014	8	—	—
Uta no Prince-sama: Idol Song: Ai Mikaze (うたの☆プリンスさまっ♪アイドルソング 美風 藍) (Shouta Aoi)	2014	4	—	—
Uta no Prince-sama: Idol Song: Camus (うたの☆プリンスさまっ♪アイドルソング カミュ) (Tomoaki Maeno)	2014	9	—	—
Uta no Prince-sama: Maji Love Revolutions: Cross Unit Idol Song: Otoya Ittoki, Natsuki Shinomiya (うたの☆プリンスさまっ♪マジLOVEレボリューションズ クロスユニットアイドルソング 一十木音也・四ノ宮那月) (Takuma Terashima and Kisho Taniyama)	2015	9	—	—
Uta no Prince-sama: Maji Love Revolutions: Idol Song: Ai Mikaze (うたの☆プリンスさまっ♪マジLOVEレボリューションズ アイドルソング 美風 藍) (Shouta Aoi)	2015	9	—	—
Uta no Prince-sama: Maji Love Revolutions: Cross Unit Idol Song: Ren Jinguji, Syo Kurusu, Cecil Aijima (うたの☆プリンスさまっ♪マジLOVEレボリューションズ クロスユニットアイドルソング 神宮寺レン・来栖 翔・愛島セシル) (Junichi Suwabe, Hiro Shimono, and Kohsuke Toriumi)	2015	3	—	—
Uta no Prince-sama: Maji Love Revolutions: Idol Song: Camus (うたの☆プリンスさまっ♪マジLOVEレボリューションズ アイドルソング カミュ) (Shouta Aoi)	2015	7	—	—
Uta no Prince-sama: Maji Love Revolutions: Idol Song: Ranmaru Kurosaki (うたの☆プリンスさまっ♪マジLOVEレボリューションズ アイドルソング 黒崎蘭丸) (Tatsuhisa Suzuki)	2015	6	—	—
Uta no Prince-sama: Maji Love Revolutions: Cross Unit Idol Song: Masato Hijirikawa, Tokiya Ichinose (うたの☆プリンスさまっ♪マジLOVEレボリューションズ クロスユニットアイドルソング 聖川真斗・一ノ瀬トキヤ) (Kenichi Suzumura and Mamoru Miyano)	2015	8	—	—
Uta no Prince-sama: Maji Love Revolutions: Idol Song: Reiji Kotobuki (うたの☆プリンスさまっ♪マジLOVEレボリューションズ アイドルソング 寿 嶺二) (Showtaro Morikubo)	2015	3	—	—
Uta no Prince-sama: Maji Love Legend Star: Duet Idol Song: Tokiya Ichinose & Eiji Otori (うたの☆プリンスさまっ♪マジLOVEレジェンドスター デュエットアイドルソング 一ノ瀬トキヤ&鳳瑛二) (Mamoru Miyano and Yuma Uchida)	2016	14	—	—
Uta no Prince-sama: Maji Love Legend Star: Duet Idol Song: Syo Kurusu & Yamato Hyuga (うたの☆プリンスさまっ♪マジLOVEレジェンドスター デュエットアイドルソング 来栖翔&日向大和) (Hiro Shimono and Ryohei Kimura)	2016	11	—	—
Uta no Prince-sama: Maji Love Legend Star: Duet Idol Song: Cecil Aijima & Shion Amakusa (うたの☆プリンスさまっ♪マジLOVEレジェンドスター デュエットアイドルソング 愛島セシル&天草シオン) (Kohsuke Toriumi and Daiki Yamashita)	2016	14	—	—
Uta no Prince-sama: Maji Love Legend Star: Duet Idol Song: Ren Jinguji & Van Kiryuin (うたの☆プリンスさまっ♪マジLOVEレジェンドスター デュエットアイドルソング 神宮寺レン&桐生院ヴァン) (Junichi Suwabe and Hidenori Takahashi)	2016	12	—	—
Uta no Prince-sama: Maji Love Legend Star: Duet Idol Song: Natsuki Shinomiya & Nagi Mikado (うたの☆プリンスさまっ♪マジLOVEレジェンドスター デュエットアイドルソング 四ノ宮那月&帝ナギ) (Kisho Taniyama and Tsubasa Yonaga)	2016	14	—	—
Uta no Prince-sama: Maji Love Legend Star: Duet Idol Song: Masato Hijirikawa & Kira Sumeragi (うたの☆プリンスさまっ♪マジLOVEレジェンドスター デュエットアイドルソング 聖川真斗&皇綺羅) (Kenichi Suzumura and Daisuke Ono)	2016	7	—	—
Uta no Prince-sama: Maji Love Legend Star: Duet Idol Song: Otoya Ittoki & Eichi Otori (うたの☆プリンスさまっ♪マジLOVEレジェンドスター デュエットアイドルソング 一十木音也&鳳瑛一) (Takuma Terashima and Hikaru Midorikawa)	2016	9	—	—
Uta no Prince-sama: Idol Song: Reiji and Camus (うたの☆プリンスさまっ♪アイドルソング 嶺二&カミュ) (Showtaro Morikubo and Tomoaki Maeno)	2017	4	—	—
Uta no Prince-sama: Idol Song: Ranmaru and Ai (うたの☆プリンスさまっ♪アイドルソング 蘭丸&藍) (Tatsuhisa Suzuki and Shouta Aoi)	2017	4	—	—
"—" denotes releases that did not chart or were not released in that region.

== Other charted songs ==
Title	Year	Peak chart positions			Sales	Album
Title	Year	JPN Oricon	JPN Hot	JPN Ani	Sales	Album
"Brand New Melody" (Takuma Terashima)	2011	—	—	1	—	Uta no Prince-sama: Solo Best Album: Otoya Ittoki "I am Here"
"Knocking on the Mind" (Kenichi Suzumura)	2011	—	—	8	—	Uta no Prince-sama: Solo Best Album: Masato Hijirikawa "Holy Knight"
"Sekai no Hate Made Believe Heart" (世界の果てまでBelieve Heart) (Junichi Suwabe)	2011	—	—	11	—	Uta no Prince-sama: Solo Best Album: Ren Jinguji "Rose Rose Romance"
"Otokogi Zenkai Go! Fight!" (男気全開Go!Fight!) (Hiro Shimono)	2011	—	—	5	—	Uta no Prince-sama: Solo Best Album: Syo Kurusu "Sweet Kiss"
"Orion de Shout Out" (オリオンでSHOUT OUT) (Kisho Taniyama)	2011	—	—	4	—	Uta no Prince-sama: Solo Best Album: Natsuki Shinomiya "Suki x Suki Hanamaru!"
"Nanairo no Compass" (七色のコンパス) (Mamoru Miyano)	2011	—	—	2	—	Uta no Prince-sama: Solo Best Album: Tokiya Ichinose "Target is You"
"Eternity Love" (Kohsuke Toriumi)	2011	—	—	3	—	Uta no Prince-sama: Solo Best Album: Cecil Aijima "Light Night"
"True Wing" (Hiro Shimono)	2013	—	24	3	—	Uta no Prince-sama: Solo Best Album: Syo Kurusu "Sweet Kiss"
"Koizakura" (恋桜) (Kenichi Suzumura)	2013	—	19	6	—	Uta no Prince-sama: Solo Best Album: Masato Hijirikawa "Holy Knight"
"Smile Magic" (Takuma Terashima)	2013	—	18	4	—	Uta no Prince-sama: Solo Best Album: Otoya Ittoki "I am Here"
"Orange Rhapsody" (オレンジラプソディ) (Junichi Suwabe)	2013	—	19	4	—	Uta no Prince-sama: Solo Best Album: Ren Jinguji "Rose Rose Romance"
"Sirius e no Chikai" (シリウスへの誓い) (Kisho Taniyama)	2013	—	20	3	—	Uta no Prince-sama: Solo Best Album: Natsuki Shinomiya "Suki x Suki Hanamaru!"
"Hoshi no Fantasia" (星のファンタジア) (Kohsuke Toriumi)	2013	—	24	6	—	Uta no Prince-sama: Solo Best Album: Cecil Aijima "Light Night"
"Crystal Time" (Mamoru Miyano)	2013	—	6	1	—	Uta no Prince-sama: Solo Best Album: Tokiya Ichinose "Target is You"
STARISH (Takuma Terashima, Mamoru Miyano, Junichi Suwabe, Kenichi Suzumura, Kisho Taniyama, Hiro Shimono, and Kohsuke Toriumi)
"Rainbow Dream"	2012	—	11	1	—	Non-album single
"Tenkuu no Miracle Star" (天空のミラクルスター)	2015	—	10	2	—	Non-album single
"Shining Romance"	2017	—	9	5	4,042	Non-album single
"Fantasic Prelude"	2018	—	31	9	1,757	Non-album single
Quartet Night (Tatsuhisa Suzuki, Shouta Aoi, Showtaro Morikubo, and Tomoaki Maeno)
"Marriage" (マリアージュ)	2014	—	8	5	—	Non-album single
Collaborations
"Day Dream" (Day Dream)	2016	—	13	3	3,905	Non-album single
"—" denotes releases that did not chart or were not released in that region.

== Tours ==
=== Concert participation ===
- Animelo Summer Live 2012: Infinity 8.26 (2012)
- Animelo Summer Live 2013: Flag Nine 8.25 (2013)
