= Showta Best =

- Regular edition

Greatest hits album by Showta
- Released: July 6, 2016
- Recorded: 2006–2009
- Genre: J-pop
- Length: 1:12:31
- Label: King Records

Showta chronology
S (2016)	Showta Best (2016)	0 (2017)

Alternate cover
- Limited edition

Showta Best (stylized as SHOWTA. BEST) is a compilation album by Showta (currently known as Shouta Aoi). (Note: Official descriptions for Shouta Aoi's discography lists his work released under the name "Showta" as separate from his current work.) The album was released on July 6, 2016.

== Background and release ==
Before entering voice acting under the stage name Shouta Aoi, Aoi had previously released music with King Records under the stage name Showta from 2006 to 2009. After Aoi left B-green and returned to King Records in 2016, King Records re-released his previous songs as a compilation album.

Showta Best was released on July 6, 2016. The limited version of the album included an alternate cover and a DVD containing all five music videos Aoi had released during the time he performed as Showta.

== Music ==
Showta Best compiles songs from Showta's six singles released from 2006 to 2008 and his debut album Eve. The album also included "Ekubo", a song performed for the soundtrack for Kanna-san Daiseikō Desu! the Movie, which was released as a promotional digital single.

== Reception ==
The album debuted at #19 in the Oricon Weekly Albums Chart, charting for 5 weeks. The album peaked at #21 on the Billboard Japan Top Album Sales, selling 4,799 copies.

== Track listing ==
Album
No.	Title	Lyrics	Music	Arrangement	Length
1.	"Negaiboshi (願い星)"	Masumi Kawamura	Hiroo Yamaguchi	Takao Kosai, Shingo Kobayashi	4:53
2.	"Hotaru (ホタル)"	Satomi	H-Wonder	Nobuyuki Shimizu	4:40
3.	"Trans-winter (Fuyu no Mukōgawa) (Trans-winter 〜冬のむこう側〜)"	Sonomi Tameoka	Sonomi Tameoka	Daisuke Kahara, REO	3:56
4.	"Fuyu no Oto (雪の音)"	Masumi Kawamura	Yasuo Ōtani	Jun Ichikawa	3:56
5.	"Hito Shizuku (ひとしずく)"	Taiyō Morito, Juli Shono	Hideya Nakazaki	Hideya Nakazaki	4:14
6.	"Reality"	mavie	Makoto Sakuma	U-Key	3:48
7.	"Kimi ni, Kaze ga Fukimasu You ni (君に、風が吹きますよ)"	Gorō Matsui	Akimitsu Honma	CMJK	4:07
8.	"Haru na no ni (春なのに)"	Miyuki Nakajima	Miyuki Nakajima	Masayuki Sakamoto	4:11
9.	"Go-gatsu Ame no Uta (五月雨のうた)"	SyunaCo., Chokkyu Murano	Tsunetaka Danjo	Masayuki Sakamoto	5:24
10.	"Gozen Ni-ji no Angel (午前2時のエンジェル)"	Caoli Cano	Caoli Cano	Seikō Nagaoka	5:04
11.	"Tameiki Button (ため息ボタン)"	Mikio Sakai	Mikio Sakai	Mikio Sakai	5:05
12.	"Watashi no Haru ga Hajimaru (私の春がはじまる)"	Ren Takayanagi	Kei Yoshikawa	Kei Yoshikawa	5:13
13.	"Yubikiri (ゆびきり)"	mavie	H-Wonder	Takao Konishi	4:45
14.	"Sausage (ソーセージ)"	Jun Ichikawa	Jun Ichikawa	Jun Ichikawa	3:52
15.	"Hikaru no Gen-chan (光のゲンちゃん)"	Kenzo Saeki	Akira Senju	Akira Senju	4:35
16.	"Ekubo (えくぼ)"	Yutaka Shinya	Yutaka Shinya	DJ Kent, Yutaka Shinya	4:48
Total length:					1:12:31

Limited edition DVD
No.	Title	Length
1.	"Negaiboshi" (MV)
2.	"Trans-winter (Fuyu no Mukōgawa)" (MV)
3.	"Hito Shizuku" (MV)
4.	"Kimi ni, Kaze ga Fukimasu You ni" (MV)
5.	"Haru na no ni" (MV)

== Charts ==
Chart (2015)	Peak position
Billboard Japan Top Albums Sales	19
Oricon Weekly Albums Chart	21
