= Ultra Blast =

Single by STARISH
- A-side: "Ultra Blast"
- B-side: "Fantasic Prelude"
- Released: February 14, 2018
- Recorded: 2018
- Genre: Anison
- Label: King Records
- Songwriter: Noriyasu Agematsu
- Producer: Elements Garden

STARISH singles chronology
"Maji Love Legend Star" (2016)	"Ultra Blast" (2018)

"Ultra Blast" (ウルトラブラスト, Urutora Burasuto) is an insert song featured in the 2019 animated film Uta no Prince-sama: Maji Love Kingdom. The song is performed by STARISH, a fictional Japanese idol boy band consisting of the characters Otoya Ittoki (voiced by Takuma Terashima), Tokiya Ichinose (voiced by Mamoru Miyano), Ren Jinguji (voiced by Junichi Suwabe), Masato Hijirikawa (voiced by Kenichi Suzumura), Natsuki Shinomiya (voiced by Kisho Taniyama, Syo Kurusu (voiced by Hiro Shimono), and Cecil Ajima (voiced by Kohsuke Toriumi). The song was released on February 14, 2018.

== Background ==
The animated film Uta no Prince-sama: Maji Love Kingdom was announced in 2017, and "Ultra Blast" was announced as the film's insert song. The single was released on February 14, 2018, along with the B-side "Fantasic Prelude."

== Reception ==
The single ranked #2 on the Oricon Weekly Singles Chart. "Ultra Blast" was ranked #3 on the Billboard Japan Hot 100, selling 13,630 copies within the first week of sales, while the B-side, "Fantasic Prelude", ranked at #31 on its first week and sold 1,757 copies. "Ultra Blast" was also ranked #1 on the Billboard Japan Hot Animation, while "Fantasic Prelude" debuted at #9. The single was ranked #13 in the Top Anime Singles of 2018, selling over 137,504 physical copies by the end of 2018. The single was certified gold by the Recording Industry Association of Japan.

== Track listing ==
All tracks are written by Elements Garden.

No.	Title	Lyrics	Music	Arrangement	Length
1.	"Ultra Blast" (ウルトラブラスト)	Noriyasu Agematsu	Junpei Fujita	Yuta Kasai	4:04
2.	"Fantasic Prelude" (ファンタジック☆プレリュード)	Noriyasu Agematsu	Noriyasu Agematsu	Hitoshi Fujima	4:49
3.	"Ultra Blast" (Instrumental)	—	Junpei Fujita	Yuta Kasai	4:04
4.	"Fantasic Prelude" (Instrumental)	—	Noriyasu Agematsu	Hitoshi Fujima	4:50
Total length:					17:49

== Charts ==
Chart (2018)	Peak position
Billboard Japan Hot 100	3
Billboard Japan Hot Animation	1
Oricon Weekly Singles Chart	2
