= 6th Seiyu Awards =

Japanese voice acting awards ceremony in 2012

- Awarded for: Voice acting in Japan
- Date: March 3, 2012
- Location: JOQR Media Plus Hall; Minato, Tokyo
- Country: Japan

Highlights
- Best Lead Actor: Hiroaki Hirata
- Best Lead Actress: Aoi Yūki
- Website: www.seiyuawards.jp

The 6th Seiyu Awards ceremony was held on March 3, 2012.

Winners	Agency	Characters	Anime
Best Actor in leading role
Hiroaki Hirata	Theater Company Subaru	Kotetsu T. Kaburagi; Yasuyoshi Sano; Vinsmoke Sanji	Tiger & Bunny; Air Gear; One Piece
Best Actress in leading role
Aoi Yūki	Pro-Fit	Madoka Kaname; Victorique de Blois; Tōru Ichii	Puella Magi Madoka Magica; Gosick; A-Channel
Best Actors in supporting roles
Ryōhei Kimura	Himawari Theatre Group	Kuga Aki; Kodaka Hasegawa; Satoru Nishimura	Kamisama Dolls; Haganai; Natsume Yūjinchō San
Mamoru Miyano	Himawari Theatre Group	Tokiya Ichinose; Taichi Mashima; Rintarō Okabe	Uta no Prince-sama Maji Love 1000% Chihayafuru; Steins;Gate
Best Actress in supporting role
Emiri Katō	81 Produce	Kyubey; Mei-Rin; Kiko Kayanuma	Puella Magi Madoka Magica; Black Butler; Darker than Black
Best Rookie Actors
Takuya Eguchi	81 Produce	Kazuya Kujo; Amemiya Taiyou	Gosick; Inazuma Eleven GO
Yoshitsugu Matsuoka	I'm Enterprise	Narumi Fujishima; Riku Seya	Kami-sama no Memo-chō; Wandering Son
Best Rookie Actresses
Ai Kayano	Pro-Fit	Meiko "Menma" Honma; Kanade Ōe	Anohana: The Flower We Saw That Day; Chihayafuru
Shiori Mikami	Aoni Production	Akari Akaza; Kaibashira-chan	YuruYuri; Sakiika-kun
Best Musical Performance
Winners		Record Label	
ST☆RISH (Takuma Terashima, Kenichi Suzumura, Kisho Taniyama, Mamoru Miyano, Junichi Suwabe, Hiro Shimono)		King Records	
Winners		Agency	
Best Personality
Yuka Iguchi		Office Osawa	
Special Achievement Award
Osamu Kobayashi		Dōjinsha Production	
Junpei Takiguchi		freelance	
Takeshi Watabe		81 Produce	
Achievement Award
Miyoko Asō		Haikyō	
Kaneta Kimotsuki		Theatre Company 21st Century Fox	
Synergy Award
Inazuma Eleven (Junko Takeuchi, Yuka Terasaki)
Kei Tomiyama Memorial Award (Topical Award)
Kenyu Horiuchi		Kenyu Office	
Kids Family Award
Ikue Ōtani		Mausu Promotion	
Kazue Takahashi Memorial Award
Keiko Toda		Look Up	
Overseas Fan's Award
Takahiro Sakurai		81 Produce	
Most Votes Award
Hiroshi Kamiya		Aoni Production	
Special Award
Ehon Yomikikase Caravantai, Tomoko Kawakami
