= God's S.T.A.R. =

2016 single by Quartet Night

Single by Quartet Night
- A-side: "God's S.T.A.R."
- B-side: "Kizuna"
- Released: December 21, 2016
- Recorded: 2016
- Genre: Anison
- Label: King Records
- Songwriter: Noriyasu Agematsu
- Producer: Elements Garden

Quartet Night singles chronology
"Evolution Eve" (2014)	"God's S.T.A.R." (2016)	"Fly to the Future" (2018)

Music video
- "God's S.T.A.R." on YouTube

"God's S.T.A.R." (pronounced "god's star") is an insert song featured in the 2016 anime series Uta no Prince-sama: Maji Love Legend Star, the fourth season of the Uta no Prince-sama anime series. The song is performed by Quartet Night, a fictional Japanese idol boy band consisting of the characters Ranmaru Kurosaki (voiced by Tatsuhisa Suzuki), Ai Mikaze (voiced by Shouta Aoi), Reiji Kotobuki (voiced by Showtaro Morikubo), and Camus (voiced by Tomoaki Maeno). The song was released on December 21, 2016.

== Reception ==
The single ranked #1 on the Oricon Weekly Singles Chart, selling over 108,000 physical copies within the first week of sales. "God's S.T.A.R." was ranked #2 on Billboard Japan Hot 100, selling 11,477 copies within the first week of sales. "God's S.T.A.R." was also ranked #1 on Billboard Japan Hot Animation. The single was certified gold by the Recording Industry Association of Japan.

== Track listing ==
All tracks are written by Elements Garden.

No.	Title	Lyrics	Music	Arrangement	Length
1.	"God's S.T.A.R"	Noriyasu Agematsu	Junpei Fujita	Junpei Fujita	4:26
2.	"Kizuna"	Noriyasu Agematsu	Noriyasu Agematsu	Daisuke Kikuta	5:18
3.	"God's S.T.A.R." (Instrumental)	—	Junpei Fujita	Junpei Fujita	4:26
4.	"Kizuna" (Instrumental)	—	Noriyasu Agematsu	Junpei Fujita	5:19
Total length:					19:29

== Charts ==
Chart (2018)	Peak position
Billboard Japan Hot 100	2
Billboard Japan Hot Animation	1
Oricon Weekly Singles Chart	1
