= Yoshie Kashiwabara =

Japanese singer and actress

Yoshie Kashiwabara 柏原芳恵
- Born: October 1, 1965 (age 60); Osaka, Japan
- Origin: Tokyo, Japan
- Genres: Kayōkyoku, Idol Kayōkyoku, Enka
- Occupations: Singer; actress; idol; singer
- Years active: 1979–present
- Labels: Philips Records; Universal Music Japan; Freeload
- Spouse: Unnamed
- Website: http://kashiwabarayoshie.com

Yoshie Kashiwabara (柏原芳恵, Kashiwabara Yoshie; born on October 1, 1965) is a Japanese pop singer and actress currently signed under Freeload agency. In the early 1980s, she gained her popularity as a teen idol and made singing debut with single No.1.

She represented Japan at the 1986 ABU Popular Song Contest.

== History ==
Born in Osaka, Yoshie Kashiwabara first rose to fame as a participant and winner of the "Star Tanjo" contest in 1979, which led to her debut as a teen idol at 14 years old with the song "No. 1." In autumn of 1981, Yoshie's 7th single "Hello Goodbye" skyrocketed in popularity, peaking as a top 6th song on the Oricon chart---marking the song her biggest hit at over 380,000 sold copies.

Yoshie's strong performance continued in 1982, with all four of her singles in that year making it into the top 10, and many were expecting her to be selected for the year-end NHK Red and White Song festival, but she was surprisingly dropped while Junko Mihara, who also debuted in 1980 along with Yoshie, was chosen, making it the headline news for that year's annual show.

Yoshie continued to work hard the next year (1983) not only by singing; she acted in a few dramas as well, and as expected, she was finally rewarded by being selected for that year's Red and White Song Festival. One of her biggest hits, "Haru na no ni", composed by Miyuki Nakajima, which was released in spring 1983, was a song about graduation, and is still one of the most popular graduation-themed songs, which is performed all over Japan during graduation period.

In 1985, Yoshie tried to leave her teen idol image behind by portraying a more mature, sexier image, and was well recognised. Her sexy posters for her hit song "Shinobi no Ai", which were hung on buildings and advertisement venues, were all stolen within days, and in this year it was found out that the then Crown Prince of Japan was a big fan of Yoshie, and instantly she was the talk of the town, pushing her to return to the stage of Kōhaku Uta Gassen (Red and White) for a second (and final) appearance.

From 1986 onwards, Yoshie began writing lyrics for her own songs, but in the ever-competitive Japanese music industry, her popularity began to decline precipitously. She then began to focus on acting and releasing many photography album, mostly featuring her in swimsuits and/or sexy lingerie. After 1990, she temporarily suspended her music activities and focuses more on releasing photo books, television appearances as a host and actress on the movies, theatre stage and television dramas.

In 2007, she released her first enka cover-album Encore under enka recording label Freeload.

In 2020, to commemorate her 40th singing debut, released new single Ku・zu:Watashi no Kare. As of now, Yoshie still sings and held her annual gala dinner show.

=== Personal life ===
Yoshie is married to common-law husband, the name hasn't been revealed to the public. In 2020, it was reported of Kashiwabara's husband being diagnosed with leukemia and has been taking care of him on daily basis.

== Legacy ==
In 2011, one of the most famous Japanese music programs, Music Station, held a special program where they counted down the Top 50 Idols of All-Time (the list spanning over four decades) based on their sales total; Yoshie Kashiwabara was in the 40th position, with total sales of 4,400,000 copies.

Other than producing 18 top-ten singles from 1981 to 1986 and performing twice (1983 and 1985) on the annual Kohaku, Yoshie's biggest achievement during her career was perhaps, despite being labelled as a pop idol, to be nominated for the best singing female artist for three consecutive years (1985–1987).

== Discography ==
=== Singles ===
List of singles, with selected chart positions
| Year | Single | Peak chart positions | Formats |
| Year | Single | JPN Physical | Formats |
|---|---|---|---|
| 1980 | "No.1" | 76 | CD, LP, Cassette |
| 1980 | "Mainichi ga Valentine" （毎日がバレンタイン） | 64 | CD, LP, Cassette |
| 1980 | "Dan 2 shō: Kuchizuke " （第二章・くちづけ） | 49 | CD, LP, Cassette |
| 1981 | "Otomegokoro Naniiro?" （乙女心何色?） | 55 | CD, LP, Cassette |
| 1981 | "Glass no Natsu" （ガラスの夏） | 21 | CD, LP, Cassette |
| 1981 | "Melancholy Hakusho" （めらんこりい白書） | 23 | CD, LP, Cassette |
| 1981 | "Hello Good-Bye" (ハロー・グッバイ) | 6 | CD, LP, Cassette |
| 1982 | "Koibitotachi no Cafe Teras" (恋人たちのキャフェテラス) | 9 | CD, LP, Cassette |
| 1982 | "Nagisa no Cinderella" （渚のシンデレラ） | 7 | CD, LP, Cassette |
| 1982 | "And Basho Kara" （あの場所から） | 9 | CD, LP, Cassette |
| 1982 | "Karin" （花梨） | 10 | CD, LP, Cassette |
| 1983 | "Haru nano ni" （春なのに） | 6 | CD, LP, Cassette |
| 1983 | "Chotto Nara Biyaku" （ちょっとなら媚薬） | 10 | CD, LP, Cassette |
| 1983 | "Natsumoyou" （夏模様） | 8 | CD, LP, Cassette |
| 1983 | "Tiny Memory" （タイニー・メモリー） | 6 | CD, LP, Cassette |
| 1983 | "Camouflage" （カム・フラージュ） | 6 | CD, LP, Cassette |
| 1984 | "Tremolo" （ト・レ・モ・ロ） | 8 | CD, LP, Cassette |
| 1984 | "Itazura Night Doll" （悪戯NIGHT DOLL） | 10 | CD, LP, Cassette |
| 1984 | "Saiai" （最愛） | 8 | CD, LP, Cassette |
| 1985 | "Lonely Kanaria" （ロンリー・カナリア） | 9 | CD, LP, Cassette |
| 1985 | "Machikutabirete Yokohama" （待ちくたびれてヨコハマ） | 9 | CD, LP, Cassette |
| 1985 | "Taiyo ha Shitteru" （太陽は知っている） | 10 | CD, LP, Cassette |
| 1985 | "Shinobi Ai" (し・の・び・愛) | 9 | CD, LP, Cassette |
| 1986 | "Haru Gokoro" （春ごころ） | 10 | CD, LP, Cassette |
| 1986 | "Hanayome ni naru Asa" （花嫁になる朝） | 18 | CD, LP, Cassette |
| 1986 | "Onna Tomodachi" （女ともだち） | 14 | CD, LP, Cassette |
| 1987 | "Tochuu Gesha" （途中下車） | 46 | CD, LP, Cassette |
| 1987 | "A・r・i・e・s" | 13 | CD, LP, Cassette |
| 1987 | "Fuyu no Kujaku" （冬の孔雀） | 67 | CD, LP, Cassette |
| 1988 | "Tasogare no Diary" （黄昏のダイアリー） | 79 | CD, LP, Cassette |
| 1988 | "Aishita Dakeyo" （愛しただけよ） | 139 | CD, Cassette |
| 1989 | "Kaseki no Mori" （化石の森) | 27 | CD, Cassette |
| 1989 | "Anata nara Dousuru" （あなたならどうする） | 184 | CD, Cassette |
| 2006 | "MaMa" | 173 | CD, digital download, streaming |
| 2008 | "Kuchizuke ni Negai wo" (くちづけに願いを) | - | CD, digital download, streaming |
| 2020 | "Kuzu: Watashi no Kare" (KU・ZU 〜ワタシの彼〜) | 172 | CD |

=== Studio albums ===
List of albums, with selected chart positions
| Title | Album details | Peak positions |
| Title | Album details | JPN Oricon |
|---|---|---|
| How To Love | Released: December 10, 1980; Label: Philips Records; Formats: CD, LP, Cassette tape, digital download, streaming | 48 |
| Lovely Songs | Released: August 13, 1981; Label: Philips Records; Formats: CD, LP, Cassette tape, digital download, streaming | 25 |
| Hello Good-bye | Released: December 15, 1981; Label: Philips Records; Formats: CD, LP, Cassette tape, digital download, streaming | 22 |
| Summer Sensation | Released: June 8, 1982; Label: Philips Records; Formats: CD, LP, Cassette tape, digital download, streaming | 15 |
| Seventeen | Released: November 25, 1982; Label: Philips Records; Formats: CD, LP, Cassette tape, digital download, streaming | 17 |
| Haru Nano ni | Released: February 10, 1983; Label: Philips Records; Formats: CD, LP, Cassette tape, digital download, streaming | 4 |
| Natsumoyou | Released: July 30, 1983; Label: Philips Records; Formats: CD, LP, Cassette tape, digital download, streaming | 16 |
| Tiny Memory | Released: November 23, 1983; Label: Philips Records}; Formats: CD, LP, Cassette tape, digital download, streaming | 20 |
| Luster | Released: April 25, 1984; Label: Philips Records; Formats: CD, LP, Cassette tape, digital download, streaming | 22 |
| Saiai | Released: October 25, 1984; Label: Philips Records; Formats: CD, LP, Cassette tape, digital download, streaming | 18 |
| Machikutabirete Yokohama | Released: June 1, 1985; Label: Philips Records; Formats: CD, LP, Cassette tape, digital download, streaming | 33 |
| Shinobi Ai | Released: October 5, 1985; Label: Philips Records; Formats: CD, LP, Cassette tape, digital download, streaming | 17 |
| Hatachi no Souvenir | Released: July 7, 1986; Label: Philips Records; Formats: CD, LP, Cassette tape, digital download, streaming | 55 |
| High heel wo Nugisuteta Onna | Released: October 15, 1986; Label: Philips Records; Formats: CD, LP, Cassette tape, digital download, streaming | 47 |
| A・r・i・e・s | Released: July 6, 1987; Label: EASTWORLD; Formats: CD, LP, Cassette tape, digital download, streaming | 37 |
| Aishuu | Released: December 5, 1987; Label: EASTWORLD; Formats: CD, LP, Cassette tape, digital download, streaming | - |
| Lover's Sunset | Released: July 6, 1988; Label: EASTWORLD; Formats: CD, LP, Cassette tape, digital download, streaming | - |
| YES, I LOVE YOU: Unmei wo Koete | Released: May 10, 1989; Label: EASTWORLD; Formats: CD, LP, Cassette tape, digital download, streaming | - |
| YES, I LOVE YOU: Unmei wo Koete | Released: June 22, 2005; Label: Freeboard; Formats: CD, LP, Cassette tape, digital download, streaming | - |
"—" denotes items which did not chart.

=== Live albums ===
List of live albums, with selected chart positions
| Title | Album details | Peak positions |
| Title | Album details | JPN Oricon |
|---|---|---|
| Dai 1 fureai: Kashiwabara Yoshie on stage | Released: May 5, 1981; Label: Philips Records; Formats: CD, LP, Cassette tape | 29 |
| Yoshie no Love Love Carnival | Released: May 1, 1982; Label: Philips Records; Formats: CD, LP, Cassette tape | 20 |
| Kashiwabara Yoshie Recital: Onna no Hishō | Released: November 25, 1986; Label: Philips Records; Formats: CD, LP, Cassette tape | - |
"—" denotes items which did not chart.

=== Cover albums ===
List of cover albums, with selected chart positions
| Title | Album details | Peak positions |
| Title | Album details | JPN Oricon |
|---|---|---|
| Encore | Released: January 11, 2007; Label: Freeboard; Formats: CD | - |
| Encore II | Released: May 6, 2010; Label: Freeboard; Formats: CD | - |
| Encore III | Released: April 27, 2016; Label: Freeboard; Formats: CD | - |
"—" denotes items which did not chart.

=== Compilation albums ===
List of compilation albums, with selected chart positions
| Title | Album details | Peak positions |
| Title | Album details | JPN Oricon |
|---|---|---|
| Kashiwabara Yoshie Best | Released: October 25, 1981; Label: Philips Records; Formats: CD, LP, Cassette tape | 32 |
| Gallery | Released: December 16, 1983; Label: Philips Records; Formats: CD LP, Cassette tape | 29 |
| Monument | Released: December 16, 1984; Label: Philips Records; Formats: CD LP, Cassette tape | 27 |
| Yoshie Complete 15 | Released: August 21, 1985; Label: Philips Records; Formats: CD | - |
| Kashiwabara Yoshie The Best | Released: December 21, 1985; Label: Philips Records; Formats: CD, LP, Cassette tape | - |
| Merci! | Released: February 2, 1986; Label: Philips Records; Formats: CD, LP, Cassette tape | 33 |
| Kashiwabara Yoshie Best Collection | Released: December 21, 1986; Label: Philips Records; Formats: CD, LP, Cassette tape | - |
| New Best Now Kashiwabara Yoshie | Released: March 5, 1988; Label: EASTWORLD; Formats: CD | - |
| TOMORROW: Kawashibara Yoshie BEST SELECTION | Released: July 5, 1989; Label: EASTWORLD; Formats: CD | - |
| The Best Kashiwabara Yoshie | Released: August 15, 1989; Label: Philips Records; Formats: CD, Cassette tape | - |
| FALL IN LOVE: Yoshie Kashiwabara BEST SELECTION II | Released: August 23, 1989; Label: EASTWORLD; Formats: CD | - |
| New Best Kashiwabara Yoshie | Released: May 26, 1993; Label: Philips Records; Formats: CD | - |
| Super Value Kashiwabara Yoshie | Released: December 19, 2001; Label: Kitty Mme; Formats: CD | - |
| GOLDEN☆BEST Kashiwabara Yoshie | Released: November 26, 2003; Label: Universal Music Japan; Formats: CD | 163 |
| CD & DVD THE BEST YOSHIE Select BEST 20 | Released: June 29, 2005; Label: Universal Music Japan; Formats: CD | - |
| Premium Selection Kashiwabara Yoshie | Released: January 18, 2006; Label: Universal Music Japan; Formats: CD | - |
| The Premium Best Kashiwabara Yoshie | Released: March 18, 2009; Label: Universal Music Japan; Formats: CD | - |
| Golden Best Kashiwabara Yoshie EMI YEARS | Released: November 23, 2011; Label: EMI Music Japan; Formats: CD | - |
| Yoshie Uta shuu | Released: April 25, 2018; Label: Free Board; Formats: CD | - |
"—" denotes items which did not chart.

=== Box sets ===
List of box sets, with selected chart positions
| Title | Album details | Peak positions |
| Title | Album details | JPN Oricon |
|---|---|---|
| Kashiwabara Yoshie Premium Box | Released: March 10, 2004; Label: Universal Music Japan; Formats: set of CDs | - |
| Kashiwabara Yoshie 25 Shuunen Kinen Box: 25TH ANNIVERSARY COMPLETE ALBUM | Released: June 29, 2005; Label: Universal Music Japan; Formats: set of CDs | - |
| 30th Anniversary Single Collection | Released: March 24, 2010; Label: Universal Music Japan; Formats: set of CDs | - |
| Live & Rarities CD+DVD BOX | Released: July 21, 2010; Label: Universal Music Japan; Formats: set of CDs | - |
"—" denotes items which did not chart.
