= Fly to the Future =

2018 song by Quartet Night

Single by Quartet Night
- A-side: "Fly to the Future"
- B-side: "The World is Mine"
- Released: August 1, 2018
- Recorded: 2018
- Genre: Anison
- Label: King Records
- Songwriter: Noriyasu Agematsu
- Producer: Elements Garden

Quartet Night singles chronology
"God's S.T.A.R." (2016)	"Fly to the Future" (2018)

"Fly to the Future" (stylized as "FLY TO THE FUTURE") is an insert song featured in the 2019 animated film Uta no Prince-sama: Maji Love Kingdom. The song is performed by Quartet Night, a fictional Japanese idol boy band consisting of the characters Ranmaru Kurosaki (voiced by Tatsuhisa Suzuki), Ai Mikaze (voiced by Shouta Aoi), Reiji Kotobuki (voiced by Showtaro Morikubo), and Camus (voiced by Tomoaki Maeno). The song was released on August 1, 2018.

== Background ==
"Fly to the Future" was announced as an insert song to the animated film Uta no Prince-sama: Maji Love Kingdom. The single was released on August 1, 2018, along with the B-side "The World is Mine", which was an insert song in the series' fourth season, Uta no Prince-sama: Legend Star.

== Reception ==
The single ranked #2 on the Oricon Weekly Singles Chart. "Fly to the Future" was ranked #2 on Billboard Japan Hot 100, selling 14,591 physical copies within the first week of sales. "Fly to the Future" was also ranked #1 on Billboard Japan Hot Animation. The single was the 5th best-selling anime single of 2018, selling over 174,889 physical copies by the end of 2018. The single was certified gold by the Recording Industry Association of Japan.

== Track listing ==
All tracks are written by Elements Garden.

No.	Title	Lyrics	Music	Arrangement	Length
1.	"Fly to the Future"	Noriyasu Agematsu	Noriyasu Agematsu	Daisuke Kikuta	5:18
2.	"The World is Mine"	Noriyasu Agematsu	Noriyasu Agematsu	Junpei Fujita	4:28
3.	"Fly to the Future" (Instrumental)	—	Noriyasu Agematsu	Daisuke Kikuta	5:18
4.	"The World is Mine" (Instrumental)	—	Noriyasu Agematsu	Junpei Fujita	4:02
Total length:					19:06

== Charts ==
Chart (2018)	Peak position
Billboard Japan Hot 100	2
Billboard Japan Hot Animation	1
Oricon Weekly Singles Chart	2
