= Hikaru no Gen-chan =

Single by Showta

from the album Showta Best
- A-side: "Hikaru no Gen-chan"
- B-side: "Sausage"
- Released: April 23, 2008
- Genre: J-pop
- Label: King Records

Showta singles chronology
"Haru na no ni" (2008)	"Hikaru no Gen-chan" (2008)	"Virginal" (2014)

"Hikaru no Gen-chan" (光のゲンちゃん) is a song by Showta, released as his 6th single on April 23, 2008. The song was featured on NHK's Minna no Uta for the months of April and May 2008 to celebrate the 1000th anniversary of The Tale of Genji.

== Background and release ==
"Hikaru no Gen-chan" is a dance song composed by Akira Senju, with lyrics written by Kenzo Saeki, for the Minna no Uta segments on NHK. The song was written to celebrate the 1000th anniversary of The Tale of Genji and was broadcast from April to May 2008. Showta performed the song, and his voice was described as having "succeeding high notes." The television segment was animated by Hiroshi Nishimura.

The single was released on April 23, 2008, under the King Records, along with "Sausage", the B-side. "Sausage", an R&B song, had previously been released on Showta's album, Eve.

== Reception ==
"Hikaru no Gen-chan" reached #140 on the Oricon Weekly Singles Chart. CDJournal described "Hikaru no Gen-chan" as having a "unique sparkle", while "Sausage" had a warm R&B taste that made an impact with Showta's "unisex-sounding" voice.

== Track listing ==
Single
No.	Title	Lyrics	Music	Arrangement	Length
1.	"Hikaru no Gen-chan (光のゲンちゃん)"	Kenzo Saeki	Akira Senju	Akira Senju	4:35
2.	"Sausage (ソーセージ)"	Jun Ichikawa	Jun Ichikawa	Jun Ichikawa	3:52
3.	"Hikaru no Gen-chan" (Instrumental)	—	Akira Senju	Akira Senju

== Charts ==
Chart	Peak position
Oricon Weekly Singles Chart	140
