= Eve (Showta album) =

Studio album by Showta
- Released: March 5, 2008
- Recorded: 2006–2008
- Genre: J-pop
- Label: King Records

Showta chronology
Eve (2008)	Blue Bird (2013)

Singles from Eve
- 1. "Negaiboshi" Released: July 26, 2006; 2. "Trans-winter (Fuyu no Mukōgawa)" Released: November 22, 2006; 3. "Hito Shizuku" Released: April 4, 2007; 4. "Kimi ni, Kaze ga Fukimasu Yō ni" Released: July 25, 2007; 5. "Haru na no ni" Released: January 23, 2008

Eve (stylized as EVE) is the debut (Note: Official descriptions for Shouta Aoi's discography lists his work released under the name "Showta" as separate from his current work, i.e. while Unlimited is his overall second studio album, it is the first album released under the name "Shouta Aoi" and official descriptions list it as his debut studio album.) studio album of Showta. The album was released on March 5, 2008.

== Background and release ==
Eve is the debut studio album of Showta. The album was released on March 5, 2008 under King Records. The limited edition included a DVD consisting of all music videos released from his first five singles.

Showta described the album as having "different voices", mentioning that he sings from different perspectives in each song, including a "pure-hearted young male protagonist" and a woman. He selected Eve as the title as a reference to Adam and Eve, representing how his performances surpassed gender and allowing him to sing from the sound and perspective of a woman.

== Music ==
Aside from containing new original songs, Eve compiles songs from Showta's previous singles released from 2006 to 2008. His debut single, "Negaiboshi", first released on July 26, 2006, was described as being sung from the perspective of a "pure-hearted young male protagonist." Other singles included "Trans-winter (Fuyu no Mukōgawa)", which was used as an insert song to the live-action television adaptation of Damens Walker; "Hito Shizuku"; "Kimi ni, Kaze ga Fukimasu Yō ni", the ending theme song to Ichiteru!; and a cover of Yoshie Kashiwabara's 1983 song "Haru na no ni."

Along with "Haru na no ni", the album also included cover renditions of other songs, such as Caoli Cano's 1995 song "Gozen Ni-ji no Angel", which Showta's producer had wanted to release after having him do demo recordings of several kayōkyoku songs. "Sausage", which was later re-released as a B-side to Showta's 6th single, "Hikaru no Gen-chan", was described as a "warm R&B song."

== Reception ==
The album debuted at #115 in the Oricon Weekly Albums Chart, charting for one week.

CDJournal described the album as having a "healing effect" and felt that Showta's clear voice suited the elegant and acoustic sound, recommending his cover renditions of "Gozen Ni-ji no Angel" and "Ichikōnen."

== Track listing ==
Album
No.	Title	Lyrics	Music	Arrangement	Length
1.	"Negaiboshi" (願い星 lit. Wishing Star)	Masumi Kawamura	Hiroo Yamaguchi	Takao Kosai; Shingo Kobayashi
2.	"Gozen Ni-ji no Angel" (午前2時のエンジェル lit. Angel at 2 PM)	Caoli Cano	Caoli Cano
3.	"Haru na no ni" (春なのに lit. Even Though It's Spring)	Miyuki Nakajima	Miyuki Nakajima	Masayuki Sakamoto
4.	"Tameiki Button" (ため息ボタン lit. Sigh Button)	Mikio Sakai	Mikio Sakai
5.	"Watashi no Haru ga Hajimaru" (私の春がはじまる lit. Spring Begins For Me)	Ren Takayanagi	Kei Yoshikawa
6.	"Yubikiri" (ゆびきり lit. Pinky Promise)	mavie	H-Wonder
7.	"Ichikōnen" (一光年 lit. One Light Year)	Masumi Kawamura	H.Wonder
8.	"Sausage" (ソーセージ)	Jun Ichikawa	Jun Ichikawa	Jun Ichikawa
9.	"Trans-winter (Fuyu no Mukōgawa)" (Trans-winter 〜冬のむこう側〜 lit. Trans-winter (The Other Side of Winter))	Sonomi Tameoka	Sonomi Tameoka	Daisuke Kahara, REO
10.	"Kimi ni, Kaze ga Fukimasu You ni" (君に、風が吹きますよ lit. May the Wind Blow Towards You)	Gorō Matsui	Akimitsu Honma	CMJK
11.	"Hito Shizuku" (ひとしずく lit. One Drop)	Taiyō Morito, Juli Shono	Hideya Nakazaki	Hideya Nakazaki
12.	"Kokuhaku" (告白 lit. Confession)	Masumi Kawamura	Oh Seok-jun
13.	"Negaiboshi" (Winter Version, bonus track)	Masumi Kawamura	Hiroo Yamaguchi

Limited edition DVD
No.	Title	Length
1.	"Negaiboshi" (promotional video)
2.	"Trans-winter (Fuyu no Mukōgawa)" (promotional video)
3.	"Hito Shizuku" (promotional video)
4.	"Kimi ni, Kaze ga Fukimasu You ni" (promotional video)
5.	"Haru na no ni" (promotional video)

== Charts ==
Chart (2008)	Peak position
Oricon Weekly Albums Chart	115
