= Uta no Prince-sama =

Japanese multimedia franchise

- Cover of the first Uta no Prince-sama game, released in 2010 for the PlayStation Portable
- Created by: Broccoli
- Original work: Uta no Prince-sama

Print publications
- Comics: See below

Films and television
- Film(s): See below
- Television series: See below

Theatrical presentations
- Musical(s): Gekidan Shining

Games
- Video game(s): See below

Audio
- Original music: Uta no Prince-sama discography

Uta no Prince-sama (Japanese: うたの☆プリンスさまっ♪, Hepburn: Uta no☆Purinsu-sama♪; lit. "Princes of Song") is a Japanese multimedia franchise by Broccoli. The original game of the same name was first released on the PlayStation Portable on June 24, 2010, and since its release, the game has spawned multiple sequels and rhythm game spin-offs. The series has also been adapted into several manga series.

An anime adaptation by A-1 Pictures began airing in 2011, titled Uta no Prince-sama: Maji Love 1000% (うたの☆プリンスさまっ♪ マジLOVE1000%), which was then followed by three sequels, a 2019 animated film titled Uta no Prince-sama: Maji Love Kingdom, and a 2022 animated film titled Uta no Prince-sama: Maji Love ST☆RISH Tours.

The franchise has been well received in Japan, with thousands of music CDs sold and charting on mainstream music charts. The games have been awarded "Best Consumer Game" in Dengeki Girls' Style Otome Game Awards 2011.

== Gameplay ==
Uta no Prince-sama is a comedy and romance visual novel in which the player assumes the character of Haruka Nanami. Uta no Prince-sama follows a branching plot line with multiple endings; depending on the decisions that the player makes during the game, the plot will progress in a specific direction.

There are seven main plot lines that the player will have the chance to experience, three of which are initially available (four in All Star). Throughout gameplay, the player is given multiple options to choose from, and text progression pauses at these points until a choice is made. To view all plot lines in their entirety, the player must replay the game multiple times and make different choices to change the plot progression. The player must also complete various minigames, which affect the different endings.

== Plot ==
With dreams of becoming a composer and someday writing a song for her favorite idol, Haruka Nanami enters the Saotome Academy, a prestigious performing arts school made up of students who are either vying to become an idol or a music producer. Haruka becomes acquainted with six of her classmates, who are all competing to become idols. For her project, she must team up with another student as an idol-producer team, and if they are successful, they will join Shining Agency after graduation. In addition, romance is strictly prohibited at their school.

== Media ==
=== Games ===
Release timeline
2010	Uta no Prince-sama (PSP)
2010	Uta no Prince-sama: Amazing Aria (PSP)
2011	Uta no Prince-sama: Sweet Serenade (PSP)
2011	Uta no Prince-sama Music (PSP)
2012	Uta no Prince-sama: Debut (PSP)
2013	Uta no Prince-sama: All Star (PSP)
2013	Uta no Prince-sama Music 2 (PSP)
2014
2015	Uta no Prince-sama Music 3 (PSVita)
2015	Uta no Prince-sama: All Star After Secret (PSP)
2016
2017	Uta no Prince-sama: Shining Live (Android & iOS)
2018
2019
2020
2021
2022
2023
2024	Uta no Prince-sama: Live Emotion (Android & iOS)

==== Main games ====
- Uta no Prince-sama was first released for the PlayStation Portable on June 24, 2010. The game's theme song, "Ao no Tsubasa", was performed by Mamoru Miyano. The game was later remastered for a PlayStation Vita port and released on August 11, 2011, under the title Uta no Prince-sama Repeat. It also released on Nintendo Switch on December 19, 2019, under the title Uta no Prince-sama Repeat Love.
- Uta no Prince-sama: Amazing Aria was released on December 23, 2010. The theme song, "Amazing Love", was performed by Takuma Terashima, Kenichi Suzumura, and Kisho Taniyama.
- Uta no Prince-sama: Sweet Serenade was released on February 10, 2011. The theme song, "Netsujou Serenade" (熱情SERENADE), was performed by Mamoru Miyano, Junichi Suwabe, and Hiro Shimono.
- Uta no Prince-sama Debut was released on May 24, 2012. The theme song is "Innocence" and performed by Mamoru Miyano.
- Uta no Prince-sama All Star was released on March 7, 2013, and introduced the characters Quartet Night. The theme song is "Quartet Night" and was performed by Tatsuhisa Suzuki, Shouta Aoi, Showtaro Morikubo, and Tomoaki Maeno as Quartet Night.
- Uta no Prince-sama All Star After Secret was released on March 12, 2015, for the PlayStation Portable. The game is a sequel to Uta no Prince-sama All Star and is centered on Quartet Night, with the members of STARISH appearing as extra routes. The theme song is "Marriage" and was performed by Tatsuhisa Suzuki, Shouta Aoi, Showtaro Morikubo, and Tomoaki Maeno as Quartet Night.
- Uta no Prince-sama: Dolce Vita was announced on June 24, 2016, to be in development for the PlayStation Vita. It was later announced on June 24, 2019, that the game would be ported to the Nintendo Switch and was cancelled for the PlayStation Vita. In June 2024, Broccoli confirmed that the game was still in development for the Nintendo Switch. On January 10, 2026, a teaser trailer was released for the game. On June 24, 2026, it was announced that the game is scheduled to release in 2027.

==== Spin-off games ====
- Uta no Prince-sama Music was released on November 24, 2011, and is a music rhythm game spin-off of the main series. The theme song is "Welcome to UtaPri World!!" and was performed by Takuma Terashima, Kenichi Suzumura, Kisho Taniyama, Mamoru Miyano, Junichi Suwabe, and Hiro Shimono as STARISH.
- Uta no Prince-sama Music 2 is the sequel to the first rhythm game spin-off and was released on September 5, 2013. The theme song is "Color Full Music."
- Uta no Prince-sama Music 3 was released on January 28, 2015, for the PlayStation Vita.
- Uta no Prince-sama Shining Live is a rhythm gacha game released on August 27, 2017, in Japan for the iOS and Android systems. The Global release was on January 24, 2018. It was co-developed by Broccoli and KLab and saw releases in both Japanese and English. The Global is scheduled to end service on December 26, 2022.
- Uta no Prince-sama Live Emotion is a rhythm gacha game released in 2024 in Japan for the iOS and Android systems.

=== Music ===
Uta no Prince-sama has seen the release of multiple CD releases, with Broccoli handling the music for the games and King Records handling the music for the anime. All songs in the franchise are produced by Elements Garden.

"Fly to the Future" by Quartet Night and "Ultra Blast" by STARISH sold over 11,000 physical copies within its first week and were both some of the top-selling anime singles of 2018. "Fly to the Future", "Ultra Blast", and "God's S.T.A.R." were certified gold by the Recording Industry Association of Japan.

=== Stage plays ===
Uta no Prince-sama has also inspired a series of stage plays, with the characters playing roles in a stage production and select characters appearing in certain plays. Music of the stage productions were later released onto CD. The first series, titled Gekidan Shining (劇団シャイニング), featured the stage plays Masquerade Mirage, Tenka Muteki no Shinobu Michi, and Joker Trap from 2013 to 2014.

The second series, titled Theatre Shining (シアターシャイニング), featured the stage plays Bloody Shadows, Pirates of the Frontier, and Everybuddy!

The third series, titled Shining Masterpiece Show, was screened at Gallery AaMo in Tokyo from February 23 to April 15, 2018, with each of the three stage plays rotating every month. The plays featured were Lost Alice, Trois: Ken to Kizuna no Monogatari, and Lycoris no Mori.

=== Anime ===
- Uta no Prince-sama

うたの☆プリンスさまっ♪ (Uta no☆Purinsu-sama♪)
- Genre: Romantic comedy
- Anime television series

Uta no Prince-sama: Maji Love 1000% Uta no Prince-sama: Maji Love 2000% Uta no Prince-sama: Maji Love Revolutions Uta no Prince-sama: Maji Love Legend Star
- Directed by: Yuu Kou (Seasons 1 & 2); Yūki Ukai (Season 2); Makoto Hoshino (Season 3); Takeshi Furuta (Season 4)
- Written by: Tomoko Konparu (Seasons 1, 3 & 4); Yuu Kou (Season 2); Yūki Ukai (Season 2); Sayaka Konno (Season 4)
- Music by: Elements Garden
- Studio: A-1 Pictures
- Licensed by: NA: Sentai Filmworks; SEA: Muse Communication
- Original network: Tokyo MX, GTV, GYT, TVA, MBS, BS11, AT-X
- Original run: July 3, 2011 – December 24, 2016
- Episodes: 52 + 1 special
- Anime film

Uta no Prince-sama: Maji Love Kingdom
- Directed by: Takeshi Furuta (chief); Chika Nagaoka
- Music by: Elements Garden
- Studio: A-1 Pictures
- Licensed by: Sentai Filmworks
- Released: June 14, 2019
- Runtime: 84 minutes
- Anime film

Uta no Prince-sama: Maji Love ST☆RISH Tours
- Directed by: Chika Nagaoka
- Music by: Elements Garden
- Studio: A-1 Pictures
- Licensed by: Sentai Filmworks
- Released: September 2, 2022
- Runtime: 102 minutes
- Anime film

Uta no Prince-sama: Taboo Night XXXX
- Directed by: Akiko Seki
- Music by: Elements Garden
- Studio: A-1 Pictures
- Released: May 9, 2025
- Runtime: 56 minutes

The March 2011 issue of Newtype magazine announced that an anime television adaptation franchise would air during the summer. Titled Uta no Prince-sama: Maji Love 1000%, the series was produced by A-1 Pictures, with Yuu Kou directing the series, Tomoko Konparu supervising the scripts, and Mitsue Mori adapting the game's original character designs. The anime series began its broadcast run on Tokyo MX, Gunma TV, and Tochigi TV on July 2, 2011 (July 3, 2011, at 12:00 AM). The video streaming service Niconico simulcasted the series to audiences in the United States, Canada, the United Kingdom, Australia, New Zealand, and South Africa.

The second season premiered on April 4, 2013, under the title Uta no Prince-sama: Maji Love 2000% (うたの☆プリンスさまっ♪マジLOVE2000%) on TV Aichi. The first season was released on January 7, 2014, on DVD/Blu-ray subtitled-only format.

A third season began airing on April 4, 2015, under the title Uta no Prince-sama: Maji Love Revolutions (うたの☆プリンスさまっ♪マジLOVEレボリューションズ). On June 27, 2015, following the broadcast of the last episode of the third season, the ending message revealed that a fourth season had been confirmed.

The fourth season, titled Uta no Prince-sama: Maji Love Legend Star, began airing on October 2, 2016. Sentai Filmworks has licensed the first and second seasons for a release in 2014, and has also licensed the third and fourth seasons. Muse Communication has licensed the series in Southeast Asia and streamed it on Muse Asia YouTube channel.

=== Films ===
During the Uta no Prince-sama: Maji Love Live 6th Stage event, the staff announced that an anime concert film titled Uta no Prince-sama: Maji Love Kingdom has been green-lit. Uta no Prince-Sama: Maji Love Kingdom is produced by A-1 Pictures and directed by Tomoka Nagaoka, with Takeshi Furuta serving as chief director. The rest of the main staff and cast from the anime series are returning to reprise their roles. The film was released in theaters on June 14, 2019. The film grossed ¥1.72 billion at box office upon its release. An English subtitled version was screened at Anime Expo 2019.

It was announced on March 27, 2021, that the a new anime concert film, Uta no Prince-sama: Maji Love ST☆RISH Tours, has been green-lit, and premiered on September 2, 2022. A-1 Pictures is returning to produce the concert film, with Chika Nagaoka serving as the director, Maki Fujioka designing the characters, and Elements Garden composing the music.

=== Manga ===
Uta no Prince-sama was adapted into several manga series. The first two manga adaptations, Uta no Prince-sama and Uta no Prince-sama Debut, were illustrated by Utako Yukihiro and serialized in Sylph. The gag comic, Uta no Prince-sama PP was illustrated by Kotoko Ichi and serialized in Comic B's Log. Alongside of that, several manga anthologies were also released with contributing fan artists.

No.	Title	Release date	ISBN
1	Uta no Prince-sama	December 22, 2010	978-4048701501
2	Uta no Prince-sama Debut	December 22, 2010	978-4048911856
3	Uta no Prince-sama PP	October 1, 2012	978-4047283886

== Reception ==
Uta no Prince-sama was the 13th top selling franchise in Japan in 2017, with a total of ¥1,667,975,801 in estimated sales. Part of its wide appeal comes from Twitter accounts run by the characters, where fans are able to be updated on the characters' music and merchandise activities, and are in turn treated like real-life celebrities.

=== Games ===
Uta no Prince-sama Repeat was awarded the Best Consumer Game by Dengeki Girl's Style for the Otome Game Awards 2011, while Uta no Prince-sama: Sweet Serenade was ranked #7 in the same category. Syo Kurusu won Best Character, while Tokiya Ichinose ranked #3 and Masato Hijirikawa as #9 in the same category.

Over 1 million users downloaded Uta no Prince-sama Shining Live upon the first week of its release.

=== Anime ===
Rebecca Silverman from Anime News Network praised Uta no Prince-sama: Maji Love 1000%, the anime's first season, for its music and fluid animation, while citing its weaknesses in the "ridiculous" plot points, poor choice in color, Haruka's character design, and that the characters never "evolve beyond their types". Bamboo Dong from Anime News Network called the series "entertaining", but felt the character designs made the characters look more like adults instead of high school students and that adapting from the original video game resulted in the "archetypal" characters having "jerky" character development. The voice actors for STARISH won the award for Best Musical Performance at the 6th Seiyu Awards, while Mamoru Miyano won the award for Best Actor in Supporting Roles.

Regarding the series' fourth season, Uta no Prince-sama: Maji Love Legend Star, Silverman praised the music and character development, but felt that the show became oversaturated with "too many characters", as well as the plot and animation going "downhill". Uta no Prince-sama has also been linked to the Odagiri effect, as seen in the later anime series where Haruka's role has been increasingly diminished in favor of the relationships between the male characters.

== Awards and nominations ==
Year	Award	Category	Work/Recipient	Result
2011	Dengeki Girl's Style Otome Game Awards 2011	Best Consumer Game	Uta no Prince-sama Repeat	Won
2011	Dengeki Girl's Style Otome Game Awards 2011	Best Consumer Game	Uta no Prince-sama: Sweet Serenade	Nominated
2011	Dengeki Girl's Style Otome Game Awards 2011	Best Character	Syo Kurusu	Won
2011	Dengeki Girl's Style Otome Game Awards 2011	Best Character	Tokiya Ichinose	Nominated
2011	Dengeki Girl's Style Otome Game Awards 2011	Best Character	Masato Hijirikawa	Nominated
2012	6th Seiyu Awards	Best Musical Performance	STARISH (Takuma Terashima, Mamoru Miyano, Junichi Suwabe, Kenichi Suzumura, Kisho Taniyama, and Hiro Shimono)	Won
2012	6th Seiyu Awards	Best Actor in Supporting Roles	Mamoru Miyano (also for Chihayafuru and Steins;Gate)	Won
