= Junichi Suwabe =

Japanese voice actor (born 1972)

- 諏訪部 順一
- Born: March 29, 1972 (age 54); Tokyo, Japan
- Occupation: Voice actor
- Years active: 1995–present
- Agent: Haikyō

Junichi Suwabe (諏訪部 順一, Suwabe Jun'ichi; born March 29, 1972) is a Japanese voice actor from Tokyo. He is affiliated with Haikyō. His popular roles include Grimmjow Jaegerjaquez in Bleach, Omega Zero in Megaman Zero 3, Keigo Atobe in The Prince of Tennis, Victor Nikiforov in Yuri!!! on ICE, Freed Justine in Fairy Tail, Masataka Ninomiya in World Trigger, Yami Sukehiro in Black Clover, Sentinel Prime in Transformers: Animated and Transformers One, Ryomen Sukuna in Jujutsu Kaisen, Archer in Fate/stay night, Ren Jinguji in Uta no Prince-sama, Undertaker in Black Butler, Leone Abbacchio in JoJo's Bizarre Adventure: Golden Wind, Daiki Aomine in Kuroko's Basketball, Jurota Shishida and Shōta Aizawa in My Hero Academia, Dandy in Space Dandy, Bercouli Synthesis One in Sword Art Online, Akira Hayama in Food Wars! Shokugeki no Soma, Dark Choco Cookie in Cookie Run: Kingdom, Shoei Barou in Blue Lock, Oda Sakunosuke in Bungo Stray Dogs, and Ryoh Grantz in Mashle: Magic and Muscles.

He was nominated for a Best Singing Award at the 6th Seiyu Awards, and received a Best Supporting Actor award at the 7th Seiyu Awards. He has also provided dubbing for Korean actor Gong Yoo.

He is in a group called PHERO☆MEN (フェロ☆メン) with fellow voice actor Kohsuke Toriumi.

== Health ==
On January 22, 2022, Suwabe tested positive for COVID-19 Omicron variant, and had been experiencing "very mild" symptoms. A month later, it was announced that Suwabe had recovered and returned to work. On December 8, 2023, he announced through his blog that starting January 1, he would be on hiatus for a few weeks to undergo surgery. He was later discharged from the hospital, and announced he would return to acting at a later date.

== Filmography ==
=== Anime ===
List of voice performances in anime television series, videos, specials, and films
Year	Title	Role	Notes	Ref
1999–2000	Great Teacher Onizuka	Koji Fujiyoshi		
2001	The Prince of Tennis	Keigo Atobe		
2001–02	X/1999	Fūma Monou		
2003	E's Otherwise	Leonid		
2003	Someday's Dreamers	Masami Oyamada		
2003	Gad Guard	Katana		
2003–04	Gilgamesh	Tria		
2003–04	Peacemaker Kurogane	Toshimaro Yoshida		
2004	Fullmetal Alchemist	Greed		
2004	Tenjho Tenge	Dan Inosato	Ep. 22	
2004	Burst Angel	Monitor Man B		
2004	DearS	Hirofumi Nonaka		
2005	Trinity Blood	Cain Nightroad		
2005	Final Fantasy VII: Advent Children	Tseng		
2005	Last Order: Final Fantasy VII	Tseng		
2005–09	Shakugan no Shana	Friagne	Also movie	
2005–06	Blood+	Van Argiano		
2005–06	Chibi Vampire	Ren Maaka		
2005–06	Keroro	Air Conditioner (Ep. 241)		
2007	Naruto	Seimei		
2007–present	Bleach	Grimmjow Jaegerjaquez	also Thousand-Year Blood War 2022-2026	
2006	Fate/stay night	Archer/Emiya		
2006	Night Head Genesis	Mikumo		
2006	Intrigue in the Bakumatsu – Irohanihoheto	Shiranui Kozo		
2006	Gintama	Goemon		
2006–07	Nana	Kyosuke Takakura		
2007–08	Dragonaut: The Resonance	Gio		
2008	Nabari no Ou	Shimizu Raikou		
2008	Vampire Knight	Akatsuki Kain		
2008	Monochrome Factor	Shirogane		
2008–present	Natsume's Book of Friends	Seiji Matoba		
2008	Black Butler	Undertaker		
2008	Legends of the Dark King: A Fist of the North Star Story	Ryurou		
2009	Pandora Hearts	Reim Lunettes		
2009	07-Ghost	Frau		
2010	Fairy Tail	Freed Justine		
2010	Fate/stay night: Unlimited Blade Works (film)	Archer	feature film	
2010	Princess Jellyfish	Shu Koibuchi		
2010	The Tatami Galaxy	Masaki Jōgasaki		
2010	The Legend of the Legendary Heroes	Miran Froaude		
2010	Highschool of the Dead	Takashi Komuro		
2010–12	Tantei Opera Milky Holmes	Narrator, Holmes		
2011	We Without Wings	Hayato Narita		
2011	Deadman Wonderland	Tsunenaga Tamaki		
2011–12	Mobile Suit Gundam AGE	Ract Elfamel		
2011–present	Uta no Prince-sama series	Ren Jinguji		
2011	A Dark Rabbit Has Seven Lives	Kurosu Phillier Yuuchi		
2011	Maji de Watashi ni Koi Shinasai!	Tadakatsu Minamoto		
2012–15	High school DxD series	Sirzechs Lucifer		
2012	Medaka Box series	Kurokami Maguro		
2012–14	Saint Seiya Omega	Orion Eden		
2012–17	Kuroko's Basketball series	Daiki Aomine	3 seasons and Last Game	
2012	Kids on the Slope	Junichi Katsuragi		
2012	Chōyaku Hyakunin isshu: Uta Koi	Ariwara no Narihira		
2012	Battle Spirits: Sword Eyes	Bullinger		
2012–20	Kingdom	Shou Hei Kun		
2012–15	Kamisama Kiss	Kirihito / Akura-Ou	Also O	
2012–13	Blast of Tempest	Natsumura Kusaribe		
2013	BlazBlue Alter Memory	Relius Clover		
2013	Unlimited Psychic Squad	Andy Hinomiya		
2013	Cuticle Detective Inaba	Hiroshi Inaba		
2013	Devil Survivor 2 The Animation	Yamato Hotsuin		
2013–present	One Piece	Vergo, Ryokugyū (1079-)		
2013	The Eccentric Family	Yaichirō		
2013	Brothers Conflict	Kaname Asahina		
2013	Meganebu!	Yukiya Minabe		
2013	Unbreakable Machine-Doll	Professor Percival		
2013	Yowamushi Pedal	Toji Kanzaki		
2013	Assassination Classroom	Tadaomi Karasuma	OVA	
2014	Space Dandy	Dandy		
2014	Wizard Barristers: Benmashi Cecil	Kiba Sameoka		
2014	Natsume's Book of Friends: Sometime on a Snowy Day	Seiji Motoba	OVA	
2014	The Irregular at Magic High School	Katsuto Jyumonji		
2014–17	PriPara	Meganii Akai		
2014	Barakamon	Takasei Kawafuji		
2014	Black Butler: Book of Circus	Undertaker	TV series	
2014	New Initial D the Movie: Legend 1: Awakening	Takeshi Nakazato		
2014	Fate/stay night: Unlimited Blade Works (TV)	Archer/Emiya	TV series	
2014	Amagi Brilliant Park	Takaya Kurisu		
2014	Gundam Reconguista in G	Fukuchō, Jugan Meinstron, Medi Susun, Rosenthale Kobashi		
2014	Akatsuki no Yona: Yona of the Dawn	Jae-Ha (Green dragon)		
2014	Space Battleship Yamato 2199: Odyssey of the Celestial Ark	Fomuto Berger	film	
2015	Yurikuma Arashi	Life Sexy		
2015	Gunslinger Stratos	Ricardo Martini		
2015	JoJo's Bizarre Adventure: Stardust Crusaders	Telence T. D'Arby		
2015	New Initial D the Movie: Legend 2: Racer	Takeshi Nakazato		
2015	Gangsta.	Worick Arcangelo		
2015	Sosei no Aquarion Love	Donar Dantes	OVA	
2015	Gate	Yōji Itami		
2015	Wooser's Hand-to-Mouth Life: Phantasmagoric Arc	The Animal Whose Name Must Not be Spoken		
2015	Food Wars! Shokugeki no Soma	Akira Hayama		
2015	Fist of the North Star: Strawberry Flavor	Shū / Toki		
2015	World Trigger	Masataka Ninomiya		
2015–17	Star-Myu: High School Star Musical	Itsuki Ōtori	season 2 in 2017	
2016	Fate/Grand Order -First Order-	Emiya		
2016	Kiznaiver	Kazunao Yamada		
2016	Prince of Stride: Alternative	Kyousuke Kuga		
2016	Twin Star Exorcists	Seigen Amawaka		
2016	The Morose Mononokean	Rippō		
2016–25	My Hero Academia	Shōta Aizawa, Jurota Shishida		
2016	Servamp	World End		
2016	Thunderbolt Fantasy	Shāng Bù Huàn	Puppet show	
2016	Danganronpa 3: The End of Hope's Peak High School	Juzo Sakakura		
2016	Food Wars! Shokugeki no Souma: The Second Plate	Akira Hayama		
2016	Yuri!!! on Ice	Viktor Nikiforov / Makkachin		
2016	Izetta: The Last Witch	Berckmann or Belkmann		
2016	Bungo Stray Dogs	Sakunosuke Oda		
2017	Interviews with Monster Girls	Takahashi Tetsuo		
2017	ACCA: 13-Territory Inspection Dept.	Grossular		
2017	The Eccentric Family 2	Yaichirō		
2017–18	Idol Time PriPara	Meganii Akai	Eps. 8 –	
2017	Black Butler: Book of the Atlantic	Undertaker	Movie	
2017	The Irregular at Magic High School: The Movie – The Girl Who Summons the Stars	Katsuto Jumonji	film	
2017	Godzilla: Planet of the Monsters	Mulu Elu Galu Gu	film	
2017	Vatican Kiseki Chousakan	Roberto Nicolas		
2017	No Game No Life: Zero	Einzieg		
2017	Nobunaga no Shinobi	Takigawa Kazumasu		
2017	Fate/Apocrypha	Saber of Black/Siegfried		
2017–21	Restaurant to Another World	Master		
2017	Saiyuki Reload Blast	Saitaisai		
2017	Shōkoku no Altair	Abiriga		
2017	Code:Realize ~Sousei no Himegimi~	Abraham Van Helsing		
2017	Dies Irae	Reinhard Heydrich		
2017	The Ancient Magus' Bride	Seth Noel		
2017	ClassicaLoid 2	Antonín Dvořák/Hippo		
2017–21	Black Clover	Yami Sukehiro		
2017	Thunderbolt Fantasy: The Sword of Life and Death	Shāng Bù Huàn	Puppet show	
2018	Bungo Stray Dogs: Dead Apple	Sakunosuke Oda	film	
2018	Rokuhōdō Yotsuiro Biyori	Sui		
2018	Space Battleship Tiramisu	Vulgar Hummer		
2018	Touken Ranbu: Hanamaru 2	Sengo Muramasa		
2018	Killing Bites	Narration		
2018	Hakumei to Mikochi	Tsumujimaru	Episode. 8	
2018	Batman Ninja	Deathstroke		
2018	Legend of the Galactic Heroes: Die Neue These	Paul von Oberstein		
2018	Gundam Build Divers	Kotaro Ogami / Tigerwolf		
2018–19	JoJo's Bizarre Adventure: Golden Wind	Leone Abbacchio		
2018	Back Street Girls	Mandarin Kinoshita		
2018	Lord of Vermilion: The Crimson King	Aoi Jun		
2018	The Seven Deadly Sins: Revival of the Commandments	Zhivago	Episode 9 (S2)	
2018	Thunderbolt Fantasy: Sword Travels in the East2	Shāng Bù Huàn	Puppet show	
2019	Sword Art Online: Alicization	Integrity Knight Bercouli		
2019	Ace of Diamond Act II	Enjō Renji		
2019	The Helpful Fox Senko-san	Kuroto Nakano		
2019	Sarazanmai	Keppi		
2019	Demon Slayer: Kimetsu no Yaiba	Kyogai		
2019	Ensemble Stars!	Nagisa Ran		
2019	BEM	Mr. Recycle		
2019	Carole & Tuesday	Kyle		
2019–20	No Guns Life	Juzo Inui		
2019	Mairimashita! Iruma-kun	Baal		
2019	Case File nº221: Kabukicho	Mrs. Hudson		
2019	Levius	Zachs Cromwell		
2020	Drifting Dragons	Gibbs		
2020	Oda Cinnamon Nobunaga	Seira Honganji		
2020	Smile Down the Runway	Hazime Yanagida		
2020	Cagaster of an Insect Cage	Qasim		
2020	Listeners	Denka		
2020	Bungou to Alchemist: Shinpan no Haguruma	Akutagawa Ryuunosuke		
2020–21	Kiratto Pri Chan	Meganii Akai		
2020	Woodpecker Detective's Office	Mori Ōgai		
2020	Great Pretender	Laurent Thierry		
2020	The Misfit of Demon King Academy	Medoin Garsa		
2020–present	Jujutsu Kaisen	Ryomen Sukuna / Double-Faced Spectre		
2020	Ikebukuro West Gate Park	Zero-One		
2021	Heaven's Design Team	Mizushima		
2021	Dr. Ramune: Mysterious Disease Specialist	Momiji		
2021	Kemono Jihen	Kohachi Inugami		
2021	Re:Zero − Starting Life in Another World	Hector		
2021	Thunderbolt Fantasy: Sword Seekers 3	Shāng Bù Huàn	Puppet show	
2021	Farewell, My Dear Cramer	Gōro Fukatsu		
2021	Mars Red	Yoshinobu Maeda		
2021	Mobile Suit Gundam: Hathaway's Flash	Kenneth Sleg	Film	
2021	Dragon Goes House-Hunting	Werepanther		
2021	Record of Ragnarok	Hermes		
2021	Kageki Shojo!!	Mamoru Ando		
2021	Tesla Note	Mickey Miller		
2021	The Night Beyond the Tricornered Window	Kazuomi Sakaki		
2021	Super Crooks	Josh (The Ghost)		
2022	Tribe Nine	Ōjirō Ōtori		
2022	Life with an Ordinary Guy Who Reincarnated into a Total Fantasy Knockout	Shen		
2022	Doraemon: Nobita's Little Star Wars 2021	Dorakoruru	Film	
2022	Ensemble Stars!! Road to Show!!	Nagisa Ran	Film	
2022	Kotaro Lives Alone	Isamu Tamaru		
2022	Ultraman Season 2	Alien Pedanto		
2022	Spy × Family	Shopkeeper		
2022	Chimimo	Jigoku-san		
2022	The Prince of Tennis II: U-17 World Cup	Keigo Atobe		
2022	Uta no Prince-sama: Maji Love ST☆RISH Tours	Ren Jinguji	Film	
2022	Tatami Time Machine Blues	Masaki Jōgasaki		
2022–23	Bastard!! -Heavy Metal, Dark Fantasy-	Yngwie von Mattström		
2022	My Master Has No Tail	Buncho Daikokutei		
2022–present	Blue Lock	Shouei Barou		
2022	Akiba Maid War	Suehiro		
2023	The Tale of the Outcasts	Naberius		
2023	Revenger	Sada the Pilgrim		
2023	Trigun Stampede	Brad		
2023	My Home Hero	Tetsuo Tosu		
2023	KamiKatsu	Bertrand		
2023	The Ancient Magus' Bride 2nd Season	Seth Noel	Ep. 10–12	
2023	Why Raeliana Ended Up at the Duke's Mansion	Siatrich Newreal Chamos		
2023	Hell's Paradise: Jigokuraku	The Seven Tensen (Yang Form)		
2023	Black Clover: Sword of the Wizard King	Yami Sukehiro	Film	
2023	The Most Heretical Last Boss Queen	Val		
2023	Ragna Crimson	Woltekamui		
2023	The Family Circumstances of the Irregular Witch	Auri		
2023	MF Ghost	Kaito Akaba		
2023	My Daughter Left the Nest and Returned an S-Rank Adventurer	Belgrieve		
2023	Frieren: Beyond Journey's End	Lügner		
2024	Mashle: The Divine Visionary Candidate Exam Arc	Ryoh Grantz		
2024	Mobile Suit Gundam SEED Freedom	Maas Symeon	Film	
2024	Dead Dead Demon's Dededede Destruction	Hiroshi Nakagawa	2 films	
2024	Astro Note	Naosuke		
2024	Blue Lock: Episode Nagi	Shouei Barou	Film	
2024	Failure Frame: I Became the Strongest and Annihilated Everything with Low-Level Spells	Civit Garland		
2024	Pseudo Harem	Motokuni Nakayama		
2024	Bye Bye, Earth	Sian Lablac		
2024	Kinnikuman: Perfect Origin Arc	Grim Reaper		
2024	2.5 Dimensional Seduction	Yoichi Higarashi		
2025	Ameku M.D.: Doctor Detective	Ryūya Naruse		
2025	Rurouni Kenshin: Kyoto Disturbance	Uonuma Usui		
2025	The Daily Life of a Middle-Aged Online Shopper in Another World	Ken'ichi		
2025–26	You and Idol Pretty Cure	Tanaka		
2025	Thunderbolt Fantasy: Sword Seekers 4	Shāng Bù Huàn	Puppet show	
2025	Yaiba: Samurai Legend	Musashi Miyamoto		
2025–26	Himitsu no AiPri: Ring-hen	Meganii Akai		
2025	My Hero Academia: Vigilantes	Shōta Aizawa/Eraser Head		
2025	Detectives These Days Are Crazy!	Keiichirō Nagumo		
2025	Private Tutor to the Duke's Daughter	Walter Howard		
2025	Secrets of the Silent Witch	Louis Miller		
2025	Uglymug, Epicfighter	Shigeru Yoshioka		
2025	Plus-Sized Misadventures in Love!	Motoki Minami		
2025	My Status as an Assassin Obviously Exceeds the Hero's	Saran Mithray		
2025	Tatsuki Fujimoto 17–26	Alien	Compilation Film (Segment: Love is Blind)	
2025	Whoever Steals This Book	Ayumu Mikura	Film	
2026	Journal with Witch	Shingo Kasamachi		
2026	Hikuidori	Kankurō Ōto		
2026	Trigun Stargaze	Brad		
2026	The Villainess Is Adored by the Prince of the Neighbor Kingdom	Keith		
2026	Love Through a Prism	Richard Church		
2026	Mobile Suit Gundam: Hathaway – The Sorcery of Nymph Circe	Kenneth Sleg	Film	
2026	Daemons of the Shadow Realm	Jin Kagemori		
2026	Witch Hat Atelier	Easthies		
2026	Black Torch	Ryosuke Shiba		
2026	Nia Liston: The Merciless Maiden	Hyurence Altoire		
2027	The Kept Man of the Princess Knight	Matthew		
2027	Mercedes and the Waning Moon	Florian		
2027	Happy Kanako's Killer Life	Assassin Company President		
2027	The Demons Are Planning Something Good!	Lord Mercysnare		

=== Video games ===
List of voice performances in video games
Year	Title	Role	Notes	Ref
2001	Final Fantasy X	Seymour Guado		
2003	Final Fantasy X-2	Seymour Guado		
2004	Mega Man Zero 3	Omega	GBA, NDS	
2004	Dragon Quest VIII: Journey of the Cursed King	Marcello		
2004	Gran Turismo 4	Car introduction narration		
2005	Kingdom Hearts II	Tournament Announcer		
2006	Enchanted Arms	Makoto		
2006	Genji: Days of the Blade	Buson		
2006	Guilty Gear series	Venom	Accent Core onwards	
2006	Mega Man ZX	Omega		
2007	Reijou Tantei Office no Jikenbo	Ryuki Kongoji	PS2	
2007	Dragoneer's Aria	Langley Boldwin	PSP	
2007	Crisis Core: Final Fantasy VII	Tseng		
2007	Tengen Toppa Gurren Lagann	Cave Nilga	NDS	
2007	Orange Honey: Boku ha KIMI ni koi shiteru	Shibazaki Hiroto	PS2	
2008	Bleach: The 3rd Phantom		NDS	
2008–2014	Street Fighter IV series	Vega (listed as Balrog)		
2008	Fate/Tiger Colosseum Upper	Archer		
2008–present	Tekken series	Lars Alexandersson		
2008	Hanayoi Romanesque: Ai to kanashimi -sore ha kimi no tame no ARIA	Houshou Kikyou	PS2	
2010	Last Escort: Club Katze	Hiragi Sannomiya	PS2, PSP	
2010	Tokimeki Memorial Girl's Side: 3rd Story	Kouichi Sakurai		
2010–present	Uta no Prince-sama series	Ren Jinguuji		
2010	Assassin's Creed Brotherhood	Cesare Borgia		
2011	Harukanaru Toki no Naka de 5 Kazahanaki (ja:遙かなる時空の中で5	Amami		
2011	Final Fantasy Type-0	Nimbus		
2011	BlazBlue series	Relius Clover		
2011	Warriors Orochi 3	Benkei		
2012	Street Fighter X Tekken	Vega (listed as Balrog), Lars Alexandersson		
2012	Asura's Wrath	Yasha		
2012	Devil Summoner: Soul Hackers	Carol J		
2013	Phantasy Star Online 2	Archer	costume option, online content	
2014	Kuroko's Basketball:The Path to Victory	Daiki Aomine	3DS	
2014	Granblue Fantasy	Seofon/Siete		
2014	JoJo's Bizarre Adventure: All Star Battle	Darby Younger	PS3	
2014	The Legend of Heroes: Trails of Cold Steel II	McBurn		
2014	Persona Q: Shadow of the Labyrinth	Theodore		
2014	Code:Realize ~Sousei no Himegimi~	Abraham Van Helsing		
2015	Shin Megami Tensei: Devil Survivor 2 Record Breaker	Yamato Hotsuin		
2015	Final Fantasy XIV: Heavensward	Warrior of Darkness		
2015	Fire Emblem Fates	Jakob (listed as Joker)		
2015	Xuccess Heaven		smartphone RPG	
2016	Fate/Grand Order	Siegfried, Emiya		
2016	Street Fighter V	Vega (listed as Balrog)		
2016	Star Ocean: Integrity and Faithlessness	Emmerson T. Kenny		
2016	Mighty No. 9	Dr. White		
2016	Ikemen Revolution: Love & Magic in Wonderland	Sirius Oswald	Otome Game on Mobile	
2016	Bungou to Alchemist	Akutagawa Ryuunosuke	PC	
2017	Fire Emblem Heroes	Joker		
2017	Nioh	Sasuke Sarutobi		
2017	Final Fantasy XIV: Stormblood	Ardbert		
2017	Xenoblade Chronicles 2	Amalthus		
2017	Touken Ranbu	Sengo Muramasa		
2017	Ensemble Stars!	Ran Nagisa		
2017	Shadowverse	Vega (listed as Balrog)	Street Fighter Expansion	
2017	Another Eden	Claude	Mobile game	
2018	Black Clover: Quartet Knights	Yami Sukehiro / young Yami		
2018	Xenoblade Chronicles 2: Torna – The Golden Country	Amalthus		
2018	Persona Q2: New Cinema Labyrinth	Theodore		
2018	My Hero One's Justice	Shōta Aizawa		
2019	Dragon Marked for Death	Warrior		
2019	Final Fantasy XIV: Shadowbringers	Ardbert		
2019	Code Vein	Jack Rutherford		
2020	My Hero One's Justice 2	Shōta Aizawa		
2020	Final Fantasy VII Remake	Tseng		
2020	HELIOS Rising Heroes	Victor Valentine		
2021	Arknights	Mr. Nothing (Wuyou)	Mobile game	
2021	Tears of Themis	Artem Wing	Otome Game on Mobile	
2021	Cookie Run: Kingdom	Dark Choco Cookie	Mobile game	
2022	Sin Chronicle	Lion	Mobile Game	
2022	The Diofield Chronicle	Fredret Lester		
2022	Dragon Quest Treasures	Muddimer, Monsters		
2022	Crisis Core: Final Fantasy VII Reunion	Tseng		
2023	Fire Emblem Engage	Diamant		
2023	Sword Art Online: Last Recollection	Bercouli		
2024	Lovebrush Chronicles	Lars Rorschach		
2024	Jujutsu Kaisen: Cursed Clash	Ryomen Sukuna		
2024	Final Fantasy VII Rebirth	Tseng		
2025	Honkai: Star Rail	Archer		
2026	The Adventures of Elliot: The Millennium Tales	Kaifried		
2026	Marvel Tōkon: Fighting Souls	Erik Brooks/Blade	Japanese voice over	
2026	Morimens: Don't Forget Last Night	Pontos		
2027	Fate/Extra Record	Archer		

=== Drama CDs ===
List of voice performances in Drama CDs
Title	Role	Notes	Ref
07-Ghost	Frau		
Brothers Conflict	Asahina Kaname		
Watashi ga Motete Dousunda	Kazuma Mutsumi		
Code:Realize ~Sousei no Himegimi~	Abraham Van Helsing		
Paradox Live	Haruomi Shingu		

=== Live-action drama ===
List of voice performances in Live-Action Drama
Year	Title	Role	Notes	Ref
1996	B-Fighter Kabuto	Heat Wind Beast Zarst	Ep. 21	
2000	Kamen Rider Kuuga	Radio DJ		
2009	Samurai Sentai Shinkenger	Ayakashi Ushirobushi	Ep. 11 – 12	
2012	Tokumei Sentai Go-Busters	Tubaloid (ep. 13), Tubaloid 2 (ep. 13 – 14)	Ep. 13 – 14	
2014	Ressha Sentai ToQger	Lamp Shadow	Ep. 11 – 12	
2016	Kamen Rider Ex-Aid	Narration, Ren Amagasaki (Partial voice) (Actor by Shinya Kote)/Loverica Bugster, Kamen Rider Chronicle Gashat Voice, Buggle Driver II Voice	Episodes 1–12, 25 – (Narration), 24 – 27 & 32 (Ren Amagasaki (Partial voice)/Loverica Bugster (Ep. 27, 32))	
2017	Kamen Rider Ex-Aid the Movie: True Ending	Mighty Creator VRX Voice, Gashacon Bugvisor II Voice/Buggle Driver II Voice	Movie	
2019	Dimension High School	Paramesos, Dictis, Green Hill, Adihilas, Dactyla (all credited as Sphinx)	Episodes 1–11	
2020	Ultra Galaxy Fight: The Absolute Conspiracy	Absolute Tartarus		
2021	Ultraman Trigger: New Generation Tiga	Absolute Tartarus	Episode 14–15	
2022	Ultra Galaxy Fight: The Destined Crossroad	Absolute Tartarus		
2024	Bakuage Sentai Boonboomger	Decotrade		
2024	ACMA:GAME	Gado		
2024	Acma: Game: The Final Key	Gado	Movie	

== Dubbing roles ==
List of voice performances in overseas film and TV
Title	Role	Voice dub for	Notes	Ref
Guardian: The Lonely and Great God	Kim Shin / Goblin	Gong Yoo	Korean drama	
Kim Ji-young: Born in 1982	Jung Dae-hyun	Gong Yoo		
Seo Bok	Min Gi-heon	Gong Yoo		
Squid Game	Recruiter	Gong Yoo	Korean drama	
The Silent Sea	Han Yoon-jae	Gong Yoo	Korean drama	
The Acolyte	Sol	Lee Jung-jae		
Ambulance	Will Sharp	Yahya Abdul-Mateen II		
American Heist	James / Jimmy Kelly	Hayden Christensen		
Backrooms	Clark	Chiwetel Ejiofor		
Barbie	Basketball Ken	Kingsley Ben-Adir		
Blonde	Cass Chaplin	Xavier Samuel		
Chennai Express	Rahul Mithaiwala	Shah Rukh Khan		
Clifford the Big Red Dog	Zac Tieran	Tony Hale		
The Continental: From the World of John Wick	Winston Scott	Colin Woodell		
Crash Landing on You	Cho Cheol-gang	Oh Man-seok		
Day of the Dead	Pvt. Rickles	Ralph Marrero	2020 Blu-ray edition	
Deadwater Fell	Steve Campbell	Matthew McNulty		
Decision to Leave	Det. Jang Hae-jun	Park Hae-il		
Dolittle	Hare	Will Arnett		
Dungeons & Dragons: Honor Among Thieves	Corpse Ven Salafin	Paul Lancaster		
Escape Room: Tournament of Champions	Nathan	Thomas Cocquerel		
Eternals	Blade	Mahershala Ali		
The Exorcist: Believer	Victor Fielding	Leslie Odom Jr.		
F4 Thailand: Boys Over Flowers	Thyme Akira Paramaanantra	Vachirawit Chivaaree		
The Flight Attendant	Buckley Ware	Colin Woodell		
Green Book	Don Shirley	Mahershala Ali		
House of the Dragon	Ser Criston Cole	Fabien Frankel		
IF	Art Teacher	Richard Jenkins		
It Chapter Two	Richie Tozier	Bill Hader		
Justice League	Victor Stone / Cyborg	Ray Fisher		
Kim Su-ro, The Iron King	Young Tal-hae	Shin Dong-ki		
The Lost Symbol	Robert Langdon	Ashley Zukerman		
Mars	Paul Richardson	John Light		
The Matrix Resurrections	Morpheus	Yahya Abdul-Mateen II		
Megalopolis	Cesar Catilina	Adam Driver		
NCIS: Origins	Mike Franks	Kyle Schmid		
The Nevers	Hugo Swann	James Norton		
Night of the Living Dead	Ben	Duane Jones	2022 Blu-Ray edition	
The Pembrokeshire Murders	Detective Superintendent Steve Wilkins	Luke Evans		
Raised by Wolves	Marcus / Caleb	Travis Fimmel		
Rebel Moon	Darrian Bloodaxe	Ray Fisher		
Snow White	Magic Mirror	Patrick Page		
Spider-Man: Homecoming	Herman Schultz / Shocker	Bokeem Woodbine		
Street Fighter	Vega	Orville Peck		
Superman	Michael Holt / Mister Terrific	Edi Gathegi		
Tomb Raider	Mathias Vogel	Walton Goggins		
Tron: Ares	Ares	Jared Leto		
The Unbearable Weight of Massive Talent	Javi Gutierrez	Pedro Pascal		
Venom	Eddie Brock	Tom Hardy		
Venom: Let There Be Carnage	Eddie Brock	Tom Hardy		
Venom: The Last Dance	Eddie Brock	Tom Hardy		
Voltes V: Legacy: Super Electromagnetic Edition	Prince Zardoz	Martin del Rosario	Filipino live-action adaptation	
West Side Story	Bernardo	David Alvarez		
Zack Snyder's Justice League	Victor Stone / Cyborg	Ray Fisher		

List of voice performances in overseas animation
Title	Role	Notes	Ref
Early Man	Jurgend		
Marvel Zombies	Eric Brooks / Blade Knight		
PAW Patrol: The Movie	Marty Muckraker		
Toy Story 5		Cameo	
Transformers One	Sentinel Prime		

== Others ==
- Suwabe Junichi no Tobedase! Nomi Nakama Vol. 1 (2015) – reached number 41 on Oricon's list for Animation DVDs.
- Suwabe Junichi no Tobidase! Nomi Nakama Vol. 2 (2015) – reached number 71 on Oricon's list for Animation DVDs.
- Kimi ka, kimi igai ka. Kimi he okuru Roland no kotoba audiobook version (scheduled for a November 14, 2022, release on Audible).
