= Hito Shizuku =

Single by Showta

from the album Eve
- A-side: "Hito Shizuku"
- B-side: "Reality"
- Released: April 4, 2007
- Genre: J-pop
- Label: King Records

Showta singles chronology
"Trans-winter (Fuyu no Mukōgawa)" (2006)	"Hito Shizuku" (2007)	"Kimi ni, Kaze ga Fukimasu You ni" (2007)

"Hito Shizuku" (ひとしずく; lit. "One Drop") is a song by Japanese singer Showta, released as his 3rd single on April 4, 2007.

== Background and release ==
"Hito Shizuku" is a mid-tempo ballad composed by Hideya Nakazaki, with lyrics written by Taiyo Morito and Juli Shono. The single was released on April 4, 2007 under the King Records, along with "Reality", the B-side.

== Reception ==
"Hito Shizuku" reached #31 on the Oricon Weekly Singles Chart and charted for 3 weeks. CDJournal described "Hito Shizuku" as healing and mentioned that Showta's androgynous voice and appearance had a mysterious charm. Barks described "Hito Shizuku" as having an "Asian taste" that will "touch the heart of any Japanese person", with Showta's vocals likely to "heal" both physically and emotionally. The music video was also praised for being masculine and mature compared to his debut.

== Track listing ==
Single
No.	Title	Lyrics	Music	Arrangement	Length
1.	"Hito Shizuku" (ひとしずく lit. One Drop)	Taiyō Morito; Juli Shono	Hideya Nakazaki	Hideya Nakazaki	4:14
2.	"Reality"	mavie	Makoto Sakuma	U-Key	3:48
3.	"Hito Shizuku" (instrumental)	—	Hideya Nakazaki	Hideya Nakazaki
4.	"Reality" (instrumental)	—	Makoto Sakuma	U-Key

== Charts ==
Chart	Peak position
Oricon Weekly Singles Chart	31
Tower Records Japanese Rock & Pop Singles	8
