= Haru na no ni =

1983 single by Yoshie Kashiwabara

Single by Yoshie Kashiwabara

from the album Haru na no ni
- A-side: "Haru na no ni"
- B-side: "Nagisa Tayori"
- Released: January 11, 1983
- Genre: Kayōkyoku
- Label: Philips Records
- Producer: Miyuki Nakajima

Yoshie Kashiwabara singles chronology
| "Karin" (1982) | "Haru na no ni" (1983) | "Chotto Nara Byaku" (1983) |

"Haru na no ni" (春なのに; lit. "Even Though It's Spring") is a song by Japanese singer Yoshie Kashiwabara, released as her 12th single on January 11, 1983.

== Background and release ==
"Haru na no ni" is a song by Yoshie Kashiwabara, released as her 12th single. The song was composed by Miyuki Nakajima. The song was also the title track of Kashiwabara's debut album of the same name.

The single was released on January 11, 1983 under the Philips Records label, along with the B-side "Nagisa Tayori", a song originally written and performed by Nakajima from her 1976 album, Watashi no Koe ga Kikoemasu ka. "Haru na no ni" was re-released as a single on February 25, 1994 by Mercury Music Entertainment, coupled with "Camouflage" as a B-side.

== Reception ==
"Haru na no ni" reached No. 6 on the Oricon Weekly Singles Chart, selling at least 33,000 copies. Because of its spring theme, the song is often used as a graduation song for Japanese students graduating in the spring.

== Track listing ==
=== 1983 version ===
All tracks are written by Miyuki Nakajima.

Single
| No. | Title | Lyrics | Music | Arrangement | Length |
|---|---|---|---|---|---|
| 1. | "Haru na no ni" (春なのに lit. Even Though It's Spring) | Miyuki Nakajima | Miyuki Nakajima | Katsuhisa Hattori; J. Saless | 3:25 |
| 2. | "Nagisa Tayori" (渚便り lit. Beach News) | Miyuki Nakajima | Miyuki Nakajima | Katsuhisa Hattori; J. Saless |

=== 1994 version ===
All tracks are written by Miyuki Nakajima.

Single
| No. | Title | Lyrics | Music | Arrangement | Length |
|---|---|---|---|---|---|
| 1. | "Haru na no ni" (春なのに lit. Even Though It's Spring) | Miyuki Nakajima | Miyuki Nakajima | Katsuhisa Hattori; J. Saless | 3:25 |
| 2. | "Camouflage" (カム・フラージュ) | Miyuki Nakajima | Miyuki Nakajima |
| 3. | "Haru na no ni" (Instrumental) | — | Miyuki Nakajima | Katsuhisa Hattori; J. Saless |
| 4. | "Camouflage" (Instrumental) | — | Miyuki Nakajima |

== Charts ==
| Chart | Peak position |
|---|---|
| Oricon Weekly Singles Chart | 6 |

== Awards and nominations ==
| Year | Award | Category | Recipient | Result |
|---|---|---|---|---|
| 1983 | 25th Japan Record Award | Composition Award | Miyuki Nakajima | Won |

== Showta version ==
"Haru na no ni"

Single by Showta

from the album Eve
- A-side: "Haru na no ni"
- B-side: "Go-gatsu Ame no Uta"
- Released: January 23, 2008
- Genre: J-pop
- Label: King Records

Showta singles chronology
| "Kimi ni, Kaze ga Fukimasu You ni" (2007) | "Haru na no ni" (2008) | "Hikaru no Gen-chan" (2008) |

=== Background and release ===
Showta released a cover of "Haru na no ni" as his 5th single on January 23, 2008. While recording demo songs, Showta's producer had him sing kayōkyoku songs and had decided to release his cover rendition of "Haru na no ni" as a single.

Tadashi Harada, who had previously worked on Shiseido commercials and won the Grand Prix Award in the JMan Make-up Contest, was in charge of the CD jacket and decided on a "diva" concept, where Showta was depicted in rhinestones and blond hair that portrayed his androgyny.

=== Reception ===
"Haru na no ni" peaked at No. 90 on the Oricon Weekly Singles Chart. CDJournal praised Showta's "vibrant singing voice", describing it as sounding like a woman, while also calling the B-side, "Go-gatsu Ame no Uta", "impressive" and comparing it to a graduation song.

=== Track listing ===
Single
| No. | Title | Lyrics | Music | Arrangement | Length |
|---|---|---|---|---|---|
| 1. | "Haru na no ni (春なのに)" (春なのに lit. Even Though It's Spring) | Miyuki Nakajima | Miyuki Nakajima | Masayuki Sakamoto | 4:11 |
| 2. | "Go-gatsu Ame no Uta" (五月雨のうた lit. The Song of Rain in May) | SyunaCo.; Chokkyu Murano | Tsunetaka Danjo | Masayuki Sakamoto | 5:24 |
| 3. | "Haru na no ni" (Instrumental) | — | Miyuki Nakajima | Masayuki Sakamoto |

=== Charts ===
| Chart | Peak position |
|---|---|
| Oricon Weekly Singles Chart | 90 |

== See also ==
- 1983 in Japanese music
