= List of Uta no Prince-sama characters =

This is a list of characters that appear in the Uta no Prince-sama franchise.

== Main characters ==
Haruka Nanami (七海 春歌, Nanami Haruka)
Voiced by: Miyuki Sawashiro (anime)
Haruka is a 15-year-old girl whose name and class can be selected by the player. She enrolls into Saotome Academy to pursue her dream of becoming a music composer and create a song for her idol, HAYATO, but she eventually becomes the sole producer for Starish. In the anime, Haruka has lived with her grandmother and has no professional music experience prior to enrolling into Saotome Academy.

=== STARISH ===
STARISH (stylized as ST☆RISH) is a Japanese idol boy band composed of students from Saotome Academy. Beginning in the second game, Uta no Prince-sama: Debut and the anime, the students were assigned to the group, with Haruka as their producer. Each member serves as possible love interests for Haruka, depending on whether the player decides to join Class A or Class S. The group's name is an acronym of the members' names. Initially starting out with six, Cecil is added to the group at the end of the first game and the anime's second season, Uta no Prince-sama: Maji Love 2000%.

Otoya Ittoki (一十木 音也, Ittoki Otoya)
Voiced by: Takuma Terashima
Otoya is a student in Class A. He's a friendly and positive person whose hobbies include soccer and raising cacti. He shares a room with Tokiya. Otoya is an orphan, as his mother supposedly died in a plane crash, and he has never met his father. He often returns to the orphanage he grew up in to play with and take care of the children. Otoya decided to become an idol because he heard his father was one. He plays the guitar. His image color is red and his birthday is on April 11.
Tokiya Ichinose (一ノ瀬 トキヤ, Ichinose Tokiya)
Voiced by: Mamoru Miyano
Tokiya is a student in Class S who bears a strong resemblance to Haruka's idol, HAYATO. Tokiya initially claims to be HAYATO's identical twin brother and seems to bear a complex from being in his brother's shadow. He appears to be cold and aloof, as well as being a perfectionist. Later on, Tokiya reveals he is HAYATO, and enrolled into Saotome Academy to debut as a more serious artist, as he despised his image as HAYATO. He believes his voice is his strongest instrument, though he is talented at a multitude of instruments. His image color is purple and his birthday is on August 6.
Ren Jinguji (神宮寺 レン, Jingūji Ren)
Voiced by: Junichi Suwabe
Ren is a student in Class S. He is the third son of the Jingūji family. He is flirtatious and affectionately calls Haruka "lady" and "little lamb." He, Masato and Ranmaru were childhood friends because they were all heirs to rich corporations, but stopped talking to each other after acknowledging their family status. His late mother was an idol, and his father hid her work after her death, though Ren later found one of her demo CDs that was dedicated to him, inspiring him to become an artist. He plays the saxophone. His image color is orange and his birthday is on February 14.
Masato Hijirikawa (聖川 真斗, Hijirikawa Masato)
Voiced by: Kenichi Suzumura
Masato is a student in Class A. Raised in a strict, traditional environment, he is the oldest son and heir to the Hijirikawa Group. He, Ranmaru and Ren were childhood friends because they were all "heirs to rich corporations." He has a strained relationship with his father due to the fact that he has chosen to become an idol rather than the head of the Hijrikawa family. Masato is serious and has a conservative way of thinking, which causes him to clash with Ren at times. He has a younger sister named Mai. He plays the piano. His image color is blue and his birthday is on December 29.
Natsuki Shinomiya (四ノ宮 那月, Shinomiya Natsuki)
Voiced by: Kishō Taniyama
Natsuki is a student in Class A. He has an extreme fondness for cute and small things, and enjoys baking, though he uses unusual ingredients and his recipes often have disastrous results. Though he currently plays the viola, he played the violin as a child, but abandoned it after his violin instructor plagiarized a composition he wrote for her and claimed it as her own. This betrayal of trust led Natsuki to develop a violent and cruel alter ego named Satsuki (砂月, Satsuki) who appears when he takes his glasses off. While Natsuki is unaware of Satsuki at first, he speaks directly to Satsuki later on in the series, the latter disappearing after acknowledging that Natsuki no longer needs his protection. His image color is yellow and his birthday is on June 9.
Syo Kurusu (来栖 翔, Kurusu Shō)
Voiced by: Hiro Shimono
Syo is a student in Class S. He is the shortest member of STARISH, but makes up for his stature with his energy, confidence, and passion. He idolizes Ryuya Hyuga and hopes to become like him. Syo has an identical twin brother, Kaoru. In the game, Syo suffers from an unnamed chronic heart condition that causes Kaoru to constantly worry about him. In the anime, Syo briefly has a fear of heights, which is later remedied with help from the others. He plays the violin. His image color is pink and his birthday is on June 9.
Cecil Aijima (愛島 セシル, Aijima Seshiru)
Voiced by: Kohsuke Toriumi
Cecil is the half-Japanese prince of the foreign nation of Agnapolis. His uncle, who did not approve of his parents' interracial relationship, used magic to curse Cecil to turn into a black cat, whom Haruka encountered and affectionately named Kuppuru. As Kuppuru, Cecil fell in love with Haruka due to her kindness toward him, eventually calling her "my princess" after he becomes human again. In the first game, he joins Saotome Academy after being freed of his curse. In Debut and the anime's second season, he is scouted by Saotome to be in the idol course. He is very cheerful, sensitive, modest, and respectful toward his peers. He plays the flute. His image color is lime green and his birthday is on October 31.

=== Quartet Night ===
Quartet Night (stylized as QUARTET NIGHT) is a veteran idol group from STARISH's company who first appears in the 2013 game Uta no Prince-sama: All Star and the anime's second season, Uta no Prince-sama: Maji Love 2000%. The group acts as mentors to STARISH.

Reiji Kotobuki (寿 嶺二, Kotobuki Reiji)
Voiced by: Showtaro Morikubo
Reiji is Otoya and Tokiya's mentor. He has a light-hearted personality and enjoys nicknaming his friends and pulling pranks, especially on Ranmaru, whom he considers an easy target. Despite his fun-loving nature, he can become very serious and competitive when there is tension between him and his opponents. He plays the maracas. His image color is dark green and his birthday is on July 13.
Ai Mikaze (美風 藍, Mikaze Ai)
Voiced by: Shouta Aoi
Ai is Syo and Natsuki's mentor. He's very apt and hardworking, and often acts as the mediator whenever Camus and Ranmaru argue. He is also notoriously strict when it comes to his teaching, and has a habit of making his previous students quit after just one month of training under him. It is eventually revealed that he is a robotic clone of Aine Kisaragi, a former idol who disappeared years ago. Because of his nature as an artificial intelligence, he often struggles to understand human emotions, but gradually becomes more adept at processing positive emotions such as love and happiness. He plays the synthesizer. His image color is lavender and his birthday is on March 1.
Ranmaru Kurosaki (黒崎 蘭丸, Kurosaki Ranmaru)
Voiced by: Tatsuhisa Suzuki
Ranmaru is a half-Japanese, half-Italian punk rocker who is Masato and Ren's mentor. He loves cats and cooking, and can be easily bribed by the food that Reiji's family shop sells. Ranmaru, Masato and Ren were childhood friends because they were all heirs to rich corporations. Ranmaru's family later lost all their fortune after his father was betrayed by a colleague, and his father died of a stress-induced heart attack after overworking himself to pay back his debt. Ranmaru became an idol in the hopes that it would alleviate his family's financial burdens, and was previously in several different rock and roll bands that all eventually dissolved. He plays the bass. His image color is maroon and his birthday is on September 29.
Camus (カミュ, Kamyu)
Voiced by: Tomoaki Maeno
Camus is a count from the fictional country of Permafrost who becomes Cecil's mentor in the anime. In front of fans, he is flirtatious, charming, and gentlemanly, but when interacting with peers, he reveals his true arrogant, rude, and abrasive nature. He often argues with his colleagues due to his stubborn personality, particularly Ranmaru, and has no intentions to become friendly with his groupmates or mentees outside of work. He is known for his love of desserts, which he often consumes in excess, and owns a borzoi named Alexander. He plays the cello. His image color is ice blue and his birthday is on January 23.

=== HEAVENS ===
HEAVENS (stylized as HE★VENS) is the rival idol group of STARISH who briefly appears in the anime's second season, Uta no Prince-sama: Maji Love 2000%, before debuting again as a seven-member group in the final episode of the third season, Uta no Prince-sama: Maji Love Revolutions. They were established as recurring characters in the fourth season, Uta no Prince-sama: Legend Star. The group's name is an acronym of the members' names.

Eiichi Ōtori (鳳 瑛一, Ōtori Eīchi)
Voiced by: Hikaru Midorikawa
Eiichi is the leader of HEAVENS and the son of the group's manager, Raging Ōtori. Eiichi has a very flamboyant and dramatic personality, and can sometimes be manipulative or invasive of others' personal space, but his actions are driven by a desperate need to meet his unaffectionate father's constant demands. Eiichi believes HEAVENS is unmatched and that it is laughable to compare other groups to them, but has also displayed genuine respect and admiration for his rivals' talents. His image color is purplish-red and his birthday is September 1.
Yamato Hyuga (日向大和, Hyuga Yamato)
Voiced by: Ryōhei Kimura
Yamato is the abrasive, athletic younger brother of Ryuya Hyuga. Unlike Syo, who idolizes Ryuya, Yamato resents his brother for constantly overshadowing him and joined HEAVENS in order to surpass Ryuya. His image color is yellowish-green and his birthday is March 30.
Van Kiryuin (桐生院ヴァン, Kiryuin Van)
Voiced by: Hidenori Takahashi
Van is a flirtatious and brash man who sometimes appears to be laid-back and uninterested in his idol work, but can actually become serious when the situation demands it. He developed feelings for Haruka after he first heard her music, and in the anime is the only character to directly ask her out on a date. His image color is cobalt blue and his birthday is on December 12.
Eiji Ōtori (鳳 瑛二, Ōtori Eiji)
Voiced by: Yuuma Uchida
Eiji is Eiichi's younger brother. Unlike his brother and father, he has a shy and polite personality. He was asked to join HEAVENS by both his brother and father. Initially, he doubted this career choice but soon came to enjoy performing as an idol. His image color is sky blue and his birthday is on October 20.
Shion Amakusa (天草シオン, Amakusa Shion)
Voiced by: Daiki Yamashita
Shion was the last member to join HEAVENS. He is quiet and introverted and often speaks in metaphors, which sometimes leads others to have a hard time understanding him. He also has a habit of falling asleep at inopportune moments. Initially completely loyal to HEAVENS, he becomes distraught to the point of panic attacks at the prospect of making music with anyone else, but eventually agrees to sing with the members of STARISH. His image color is periwinkle and his birthday is on November 4.
Nagi Mikado (帝 ナギ, Mikado Nagi)
Voiced by: Tsubasa Yonaga
Nagi is the youngest member of the group at 13 years old. He tends to get a lot of compliments from fans and acts childish because of his cute appearance. Despite his cute and innocent demeanor, he can sometimes be hostile. His image color is light pink and his birthday is January 7.
Kira Sumeragi (皇 綺羅, Sumeragi Kira)
Voiced by: Daisuke Ono
Kira has a serious, taciturn personality and prefers not to speak. Others often read him as rude due to his stoic demeanor, but he is a kind and intelligent man underneath his outward appearance. Kira pursued music as he feels it is more effective for him to express his emotions through song than through merely speaking. He was originally the heir of the Sumeragi Group, and his father opposed him becoming an idol, but Kira defied him to pursue his musical ambitions. His image color is gold and his birthday is on May 5.

== Supporting characters ==
=== Saotome Academy ===
Tomochika Shibuya (渋谷 友千香, Shibuya Tomochika)
Voiced by: Yuka Imai
Tomochika is Haruka's best friend, classmate, and roommate. Her dream is to become a famous idol. She plays the electone and is 15 years old at the start of the series. Her birthday is on July 7.
Kaoru Kurusu (来栖 薫, Kurusu Kaoru)
Voiced by: Yūki Kaji
Kaoru is Syo's younger twin brother. He attends Saotome Academy's sister school and studies to become a doctor. His birthday is on June 9.
Shining Saotome (シャイニング早乙女, Shainingu Saotome)
Voiced by: Norio Wakamoto
Shining Saotome is the eccentric principal of the Saotome Academy, a prestigious idol school. He was a famous idol when he was younger, popular for the song "Owing to Love" (愛故に, Ai yue ni). He has a habit of spying on students and popping up at random times to give advice. In Debut, it is revealed that he is Otoya's father, but covered up this fact to avoid scandals. His 14-year-old self, using his real name Mitsuo Saotome (早乙女 光男, Saotome Mitsuo), appears as a love interest in Amazing Aria. He plays the bongos. His birthday is on November 22.
Ringo Tsukimiya (月宮 林檎, Tsukimiya Ringo)
Voiced by: Yuuichi Nakamura
Ringo is Class A's teacher. He is a male idol who crossdresses as a female because of his agency, and his biggest dream is to perform as a male idol. He plays the clarinet. His birthday is on September 15.
Ryuya Hyuga (日向 龍也, Hyūga Ryūya)
Voiced by: Kouji Yusa
Ryuya is Class S's teacher and the older brother of Yamato Hyuga. He is an actor who Syo idolizes. He was formerly an idol, but he quit after his former partner, Haruki, died in a car accident. He plays the trumpet. His birthday is on May 15.

=== Raging Entertainment ===
Raging Otori (レイジング 鳳, Reijingu Ootori)
Voiced by: Tomokazu Sugita
Raging Otori is the president of Raging Entertainment who manages HEAVENS, in which both his sons, Eiichi and Eiji Otori are part of. Like Saotome, he was also a famous idol when he was younger, popular for the song "LOVE IS DEAD". He has an intimidating and harsh personality, fueled by his rivalry towards Saotome whom he is desperate to crush.
