= List of Kuroko's Basketball characters =

This is a list of characters from the manga series Kuroko's Basketball by Tadatoshi Fujimaki.

== Characters ==
=== Seirin High ===
Seirin High's basketball team was founded only the year before the manga; despite this setbacks and only including freshmen, the team made it all the way to the final league in that year's Inter-High school tournament. This year, the team's notable newcomers include Tetsuya Kuroko, the main character of the manga, as well as Taiga Kagami.

Tetsuya Kuroko (黒子 テツヤ, Kuroko Tetsuya)
Voiced by: Kenshō Ono; Ami Koshimizu (VOMIC) (Japanese); Khoi Dao (English)
Kuroko is the "phantom" sixth man of the "Generation of Miracles" (キセキの世代, Kiseki no Sedai). Although he was an essential member of the Teiko Middle School basketball team, Kuroko was largely unknown due to his unassuming physique and natural lack of presence. A running gag in the series is that he is nearly invisible and everyone tends to forget he is there. He capitalizes on this ability on the court by combining it with misdirection, which allows him to stay unguarded by opponents and in turn, make open passes or steals. Due to his unusual playstyle, his position is often listed as a question mark. His talent was first discovered by Akashi who helped him perfect his passing skill but did not teach him anything else. It was proved to be intentional as Akashi already predicted that learning other skills will attract people's attention to Kuroko, making his misdirection and lack of presence, his greatest weapons, ineffective. Kuroko is satisfied with playing the assist role and considers himself a "shadow", whose goal is to help his "light" shine. At the beginning of the series, he chooses Kagami to be his "light".
Kuroko is usually quiet, polite and has a tendency to speak and act in a completely deadpan manner. However, there are rare moments when he displays emotion, such as anger towards Kirisaki Daīchi's dirty playstyle.
Taiga Kagami (火神 大我, Kagami Taiga)
Voiced by: Yūki Ono; Katsuyuki Konishi (VOMIC) (Japanese); Zeno Robinson (English)
Kagami is a freshman and the power forward on Seirin's basketball team. He is a naturally gifted player and has developed to be equal to the Generation of Miracles. He immigrated to the United States as a child and only returned to Japan near the end of middle school. At first, he was disappointed by Japan's relatively low level of basketball skill compared to what he is used to in the United States, however once he learns of the existence of the "Generation of Miracles", he becomes motivated by the desire to compete with them. While he is a powerful all-around player, Kagami's unique skill is his impressive jumping ability. With Kuroko's help, he quickly becomes the star player on Seirin's team.
Kagami has a direct and quick-tempered personality. He often acts before he thinks and plays basketball with instinct. He is childhood friends with Himuro Tatsuya, who he calls his "brother", and they were both trained by Alex Garcia while in America. Despite his tough appearance, he is extremely afraid of dogs.
Junpei Hyūga (日向 順平, Hyūga Junpei)
Voiced by: Yoshimasa Hosoya; Shinji Kawada (VOMIC) (Japanese); Alan Lee (English)
Captain of the Seirin team, Hyuuga is a clutch shooter, his capabilities escalating immensely when the team is in a pinch. Along with Hyuuga's change in skill comes a change in personality; normally Hyuuga is a collected and calm individual, but when he isn't, he becomes heated and rude. This is called "clutch time" and happens primarily when the match intensifies but he has been seen acting like this outside of games. He is the best shooter on the team, regularly making three-point shots throughout the course of a game. Prior to the addition of Kuroko and Kagami, he was one of the centerpieces of the Seirin team's 'run and gun' play style, catching balls scooped by Kiyoshi near the net to shoot as three-pointers. He is also seen being able to shoot a three-pointer two meters from the three-point line. His special move is called "Barrier Jumper", in which he takes a quick jab step away from the opponent and successfully make a jumpshot. The downside of this technique is that, when used repeatedly, the defender starts to adjust to its timing. Near the end of the 4th quarter of the Seirin vs Rakuzan match, he manages to perfectly copy Mibuchi's "Earth Shot". Notably, he is the only player in the series so far to receive a technical foul (for excessive complaining) and out of all the players in Seirin, he has the highest shooting success rate. Also, prior to the four fouls he received in the finals against Rakuzan, he is also the only player who has almost never been seen subbed out once. This is most probably due to him being the captain and the only shooting guard in the team. He is very big on respect for the seniors.
Shun Izuki (伊月 俊, Izuki Shun)
Voiced by: Hirofumi Nojima; Takashi Ōhara (VOMIC) (Japanese); Brandon Winckler (English)
Acting as the team's "control tower", Izuki is always calm and collected. While he has no special physical abilities, he has the "Eagle Eye", a mental skill that helps him visualize the court from any point of view and make accurate blind passes. Izuki's special move is called Eagle Spear, in which he steals the ball from an opponent using his arm to knock it away in their blind spot. His Eagle Eye helps him in doing so, associated with his ability to think ahead before the opponent. His Eagle Eye has developed to the point that he can pass through Yosen High's Eagle Wall and predict Hayama's Lightning Dribble. However, his Eagle Eye has a blind spot unlike the Hawk Eye, which Mayuzumi takes advantage of. He loves puns, a running gag being that he makes them quite frequently much to the chagrin of his teammates.
Shinji Koganei (小金井 真司, Koganei Shinji)
Voiced by: Takuya Eguchi; Atsushi Abe (VOMIC) (Japanese); Tommy Arciniega (English)
Considered a jack of all trades, master of none, Koganei is a fairly skilled all-rounder, having started playing basketball during his first year in high school. This is driven home when his coach denotes his special skill as 'being able to shoot from any point on the court, with a so-so accuracy rate'; a decidedly normal ability. He serves as the sixth man of Seirin's team, often coming off the bench for the other players, and has the most energetic personality out of all the players on the team. He is, however, quite intelligent, ranking in the top 20% of his class, though he does not excel in any particular subject. Players compare Koganei's seemingly wild reflexes to that of a feral cat. He is the only non-prodigal player to possess this skill, having acquired it from his experience in playing tennis.
Rinnosuke Mitobe (水戸部 凛之助, Mitobe Rinnosuke)
Voiced by: unknown; Fumihiro Okabayashi (VOMIC) (Japanese); Phillip Reich (English)
A stalwart player, Mitobe is very quiet and reserved. Although he is never shown speaking (except for in VOMIC), Koganei seems to understand his gestures and expressions perfectly. A hard worker with excellent defensive skills, he is also an accomplished hook shooter. He lives in a small house with a very large family, and is tasked with making and serving breakfast. He was the team's starting center while Kiyoshi was injured.
Satoshi Tsuchida (土田 聡史, Tsuchida Satoshi)
Voiced by: Gō Inoue (Japanese); Landon McDonald (English)
While a regular member of the team in his first year, Tsuchida now sees little game-time due to the addition of Kuroko and Kagami. Good with rebounds, he is apparently not quite as skilled as the other regulars, but remains a key component of the old team's playing style.
Teppei Kiyoshi (木吉 鉄平, Kiyoshi Teppei)
Voiced by: Kenji Hamada (Japanese); Jalen K. Cassell (English)
Teppei is a second-year student and one of the founders of Seirin's basketball team. He was not present throughout the Interhigh tournament due to being hospitalized for a knee injury. While he returned to the team for Winter Cup, his knee is not fully healed and it is to be the last year he plays for Seirin. He is typically a center, but his playmaking ability allows him to occasionally play the point guard position as well. Since middle school, he has been known as one of the "Five Uncrowned Kings" (無冠の五将, Mukan no Goshō), a group of prodigal players overshadowed by the Generation of Miracles. Famous for his tenacity and determination, Kiyoshi is nicknamed the "Iron-Heart" (鉄心, Tesshin).
Koki Furihata (降旗 光樹, Furihata Kōki), Hiroshi Fukuda (福田 寛, Fukuda Hiroshi), Koichi Kawahara (河原 浩一, Kawahara Kōichi)
Koki Voiced by: Naoki Mizutani (Japanese); David Errigo Jr. (English)
Hiroshi Voiced by: Tetsuo Sasaki (Japanese); Dave Wallace (English)
Koichi Voiced by: Yasuhiro Yoshimoto (Japanese); Lucien Dodge (English)
The three first-year students joined Seirin's team along with Kuroko and Kagami. They see very limited playing time and are mostly found on the bench. They play point guard, center and small forward respectively.
Riko Aida (相田 リコ, Aida Riko)
Voiced by: Chiwa Saitō (Japanese); Abby Trott (English), Ayumi Fujimura (VOMIC)
Riko is a second-year student and the coach of Seirin. Despite being a student, she is very authoritative while acting as coach. She has the unique ability to scan and evaluate the physical capabilities of players at a glance, which she gained from work with her sports trainer father and spending her time looking at the muscles of athletes and their related data. She is very devoted to the team and even uses her father's sports facilities to devise unique training programs. She is a very bad cook, almost always making people sick after eating her food.
Tetsuya #2 (テツヤ二号, Tetsuya Nigō)
Voiced by: Hirofumi Nojima (Japanese); Khoi Dao (English)
He is a stray dog that was taken in by the team as a sort of mascot, and wears a Seirin jersey #16. He is given the name Tetsuya #2 for having eyes that look like Kuroko's.

=== Kaijō High ===
Kaijō is a National-level school that makes it to the Interhigh tournament each year. Although it is the first team Seirin plays, it is not in the Tokyo district like Seirin, Shūtoku, Seihō, Senshinkan and Tōō Academy.

Ryōta Kise (黄瀬 涼太, Kise Ryōta)
Voiced by: Ryōhei Kimura (Japanese); Erik Scott Kimerer (English), Takashi Ōhara (VOMIC)
Kise is a freshman at Kaijō High and plays the small forward position. He was the fifth member of the "Generation of Miracles" and only started playing basketball in the second year of middle school. Kise is a well-rounded athlete and has the ability to copy other players' moves after only seeing them once, although his copying is limited by what he is physically capable of. Early in the series, Kise calls himself the weakest of the Generation of Miracles and notes that the other members all have abilities that he is unable to copy. This later changes when he develops the skill "Perfect Copy". In middle school, Kise became inspired to play basketball upon seeing Aomine play. While he had been bored by how easy it was to master other sports he had tried, Aomine made him doubt if he can ever become as good in basketball.
Kise is friendly and pleasant to those he respects and adds a "-chii" suffix to their names, however he can be arrogant and mischievous to those he does not. Kise is noted to be very handsome and has a large female fanbase within the story. He works as a model outside of school and basketball activities.
Yukio Kasamatsu (笠松 幸男, Kasamatsu Yukio)
Voiced by: Sōichirō Hoshi (Japanese); Alejandro Saab (English), Tooru Sakurai (VOMIC)
The captain of Kaijō's basketball team, Kasamatsu is a nationally credited point guard. Possessed of a short temper and often exceedingly serious demeanor, he can become quickly irritated by the antics of his teammates. He takes his responsibility as team captain very seriously and is extremely devoted to his team, which Kise eventually learns to respect. He is the emotional pillar of Kaijō's team.
Mitsuhiro Hayakawa (早川 充洋, Hayakawa Mitsuhiro)
Voiced by: Kazunori Nomata (Japanese); Keith Silverstein (English)
A lively and excitable second-year, Hayakawa excels in offensive rebounds and is a ferocious power forward. Very energetic and modestly immature, he has a strange tendency in his speech to skip over certain letters, making it difficult even for his teammates to understand him.
Yoshitaka Moriyama (森山 由孝, Moriyama Yoshitaka)
Voiced by: Tomoyuki Higuchi (Japanese); Landon McDonald (English)
The flirtatious, third-year Shooting Guard of the Kaijō team, Moriyama is a reliable player with a unique shooting form. He is quick to notice pretty women and often claims to fight for them on the court.
Kōji Kobori (小堀浩二, Kobori Kōji)
Voiced by: Yoshihito Sasaki (Japanese); Mick Lauer (English)
A tall and muscular third-year Center, Kobori can hold his own defensively against most centers and can score in the low post. He is rather calm and prefers to stay out of the spotlight and out of trouble. He is focused and passionate.

=== Shūtoku High ===
Shūtoku High is one of the "Three Kings" of Tokyo, along with Seihō High and Senshinkan High - three schools that have represented Tokyo in the InterHigh Nationals every year for the past ten years. Beyond the Tokyo finals, Shūtoku has made it to the Final Eight in the Nationals. Last year, the Seirin team was defeated by the Shūtoku team. Now, a member of the "Generation of Miracles" plays for Shūtoku.

Shintarō Midorima (緑間 真太郎, Midorima Shintarō)
Voiced by: Daisuke Ono (Japanese); Daman Mills (English)
Midorima was known as the #1 shooter of the "Generation of Miracles". He is now the shooting guard on Shūtoku High's basketball team. He has incredible accuracy and is said to never miss, even when his three pointers have the shooting range of the entire court. He is also a well-rounded player but his other skills are often overshadowed by his unbelievable threes. He was the vice captain at Teiko and often accompanied Akashi. They frequently played Shogi together between classes. Unlike some of the other "Generation of Miracles", Midorima consistently trains hard and stays late for practice, with the motto that he does "everything humanly possible." He did not like his new team at Shūtoku initially, but grows to respect everyone for their efforts and hard work.
Midorima is shown to be caring and considerate, despite always speaking harshly. He has a verbal tic that ends all sentences with "-nanodayo". He is deeply superstitious and follows the Oha-Asa Daily Horoscope religiously. His sign is Cancer and he always carries a corresponding lucky item depending on the day, and believes that the horoscope predictions have a direct impact on his game.
Kazunari Takao (高尾 和成, Takao Kazunari)
Voiced by: Tatsuhisa Suzuki (Japanese); Sean Chiplock (English)
A freshman at Shūtoku High, Takao is much like Kuroko in that he is a passing expert. However, unlike Kuroko, Takao has none of Kuroko's invisibility. Instead, Takao possesses the "Hawk Eye", a mental skill superior even to Seirin's Izuki's Eagle Eye. Like the Eagle Eye, it also enables him to make blind passes. The main difference between the Hawk Eye and the Eagle Eye is scope; the Hawk Eye has an even wider range of vision, allowing the player to see everything on the court without focusing on anything. Because of this, Takao is not fooled by Kuroko's misdirection, which utilizes both Kuroko's naturally invisible nature and techniques to divert the attention of those trying to focus on him in particular. Takao's Hawk Eye only weakness results from when Kuroko purposely draws attention to himself, which forces Takao to unconsciously focus on him. This allows Kuroko to use misdirection successfully and disappear from Takao's view. During their match against Rakuzan, he and Midorima showed their new technique called the Sky Direct 3P Shot that utilizes his own accurate passes and Midorima's shooting. They made this play to counter Akashi's Emperor Eye, since the height difference leads to Akashi simply not being able to steal the ball because it is out of his reach, even if he can foresee the move. This play is a huge gamble though, something Midorima had to overcome himself by trusting his teammates greatly. It consists of Midorima shooting without the ball and during the process of shooting he receives the ball in his hands, passed by Takao. If the pass goes through and the shot is unaltered, this play is almost impossible to stop, especially with Midorima's shooting and Takao's passing. However, as Midorima is left-handed, the pass course must always come from the left, making the passes somewhat predictable as showcased by Akashi.
Takao often hangs out with Midorima in his spare time, as he is constantly seen driving Midorima around in a rickshaw-like cart attached to his bicycle. Although they always play paper-rock-scissors to determine who will drive the other, Midorima wins every time. Takao possesses a funny and mischievous personality, contrasting Midorima's tsundere demeanor.
Taisuke Ōtsubo (大坪 泰介, Ōtsubo Taisuke)
Voiced by: Kensuke Satō (Japanese); Xander Mobus (English)
Shūtoku's third-year Center and captain, he was largely responsible for the team's success the previous year. Possessed of a size and skill that surpasses most other Centers in high school basketball, he can devastate opposing defenses single-handedly and control the inside of the court with impunity.
Kiyoshi Miyaji (宮地 清志, Miyaji Kiyoshi)
Voiced by: Masayuki Shoji (Japanese); Jon Allen (English)
A third-year Shūtoku regular and the starting small forward. He dislikes Midorima's attitude and special status greatly; whenever Midorima makes an outlandish demand he frequently responds with a violent threat, often asking if anyone has a pineapple or durian, assumed to be for throwing at the object of his dislike. He is hardworking and skilled, and is known as the most intimidating of the upperclassmen by the first-years.
Shinsuke Kimura (木村 信介, Kimura Shinsuke)
Voiced by: Yoshikazu Sato (Japanese); Bill Rogers (English)
A third-year Shūtoku regular and the starting power forward. He shares Miyaji's distaste for Midorima, and frequently offers support of the latter's violent proposals, often offering to help Miyaji acquire fruit to throw. He shares a similar history with Miyaji, being very hardworking and having entered the Shutoku first string his second year, having been placed in the second string during his first year. Despite his height and position as a power forward, he is apparently unable to dunk.

=== Tōō Academy ===
Daiki Aomine (青峰 大輝, Aomine Daiki)
Voiced by: Junichi Suwabe (Japanese); Ben Diskin (English)
Aomine is a freshman at Tōō Academy and the former ace of the "Generation of Miracles". He plays the power forward position. He is known for his agility, free playstyle, and the ability to make seemingly impossible shots. He is so talented that he can dominate the game despite never going to practice. He chose to attend Tōō Academy, a school that is not historically strong, because they are willing to accommodate his antics, such as skipping practice and not attending games. He is often found napping on the school's roof during class or practice time.
Aomine used to partner very well with Kuroko during the early days in Teiko and was Kuroko's "light" before Kagami. This was until his view on basketball changed and he adopted a solo playstyle that doesn't rely on anyone else. His uncooperative attitude stems from his love for basketball and the game becoming dull from the lack of challenge. Despite his favorite saying being "the only one who can beat me is me", Aomine actually wishes for a worthy opponent and his game is elevated further when he is under pressure. He is the first person to master using a trigger to enter "Zone" at will. He is childhood friends with Momoi.
Satsuki Momoi (桃井 さつき, Momoi Satsuki)
Voiced by: Fumiko Orikasa (Japanese); Xanthe Huynh (English)
Formerly the manager of Teikō's "Generation of Miracles", she is now the manager of Tōō Academy's team. Proclaiming herself to be Kuroko's girlfriend, she harbors a vivid fascination for her former teammate, hugging him with extreme glee whenever they meet; Kuroko never fails to return her advances with kindness (though in rebuke). Shrewd, calculating and observant, Momoi is renowned for her exceptional ability to plan nearly flawless strategies. She is able analyze every ability of the player and predict their moves. So far, the only person she cannot predict is Kuroko, because of his lack of presence. Just like Riko, she is also a bad cook; she served uncut lemons to her team as well.
She is Aomine's childhood friend, calling him "Dai-chan" and one of the few people he makes any effort to behave jovially to. Though she expresses devotion to Kuroko, she cares deeply for Aomine's welfare and state of mind, and is heavily concerned about his opinion of her.
Shōichi Imayoshi (今吉 翔一, Imayoshi Shōichi)
Voiced by: Kazuya Nakai (Japanese); Brian Beacock (English)
Tōō Academy's captain and Point Guard, he is a well-spoken and superficially kind on first glance, but hides a somewhat darker personality that more subtly reveals itself in conversation. Speaking in the typically polite Kansai dialect, Imayoshi laces what would be pleasant conversation with slight jabs at others' weaknesses and understated but absolute expressions of his own confidence. While he displays no unique skills, he is a highly effective captain, culling the collective efforts of the Tōō team (widely known for being composed of individuals with very specialized styles and poor compatibility with other teammates).
Ryō Sakurai (桜井 良, Sakurai Ryō)
Voiced by: Nobunaga Shimazaki (Japanese); Griffin Burns (English)
A first-year of the Tōō team, Sakurai is the team's shooting guard and "preemptive strike leader", and is skilled at releasing the ball in the middle of a jump shot with great accuracy. He possesses a very weak and delicate personality, frequently feeling blame for things out of his control and apologizing for them frequently and comically. Facing Seirin a second time, it is revealed that like Hyuga, he has another personality that is the exact opposite of his true self. The same as Hyuga, his shots also gets better and more accurate.
Kōsuke Wakamatsu (若松 孝輔, Wakamatsu Kōsuke)
Voiced by: Kōsuke Toriumi (Japanese); Jonah Scott (English)
Second-year regular and center of the Tōō team, Wakamatsu is easily agitated and extremely loud. Being a player of notable stature, he performs commendably on the defensive, and scoops up rebounds with relative ease. He despises Aomine and frequently expresses his distaste for the latter's lackluster attitude and special treatment within the team, both out of personal jealousy and concern for their team's longevity. He is on very bad terms with Aomine, as he cannot accept someone who skips practice and eats Sakurai's food. Nevertheless, he acknowledges Aomine as the best player on the team.

=== Yōsen High ===
Atsushi Murasakibara (紫原 敦, Murasakibara Atsushi)
Voiced by: Kenichi Suzumura (Japanese); Robbie Daymond (English)
Formerly the center of the "Generation of Miracles", Murasakibara now attends Yōsen High School in Akita. He stands out as extremely tall among his peers with a height of 208 cm (6 ft 10 in) and is the most physically gifted player, even among the "Generation of Miracles". Not only does he have a power and size advantage over his opponents, he is also very fast due to his long strides and can singlehandedly defend the entire area within the three point line. On offense, his "Thor's Hammer" dunk is unstoppable and can knock down multiple defenders in the paint. He is said to have scored over 100 points in a single game in middle school.
Murasakibara loves snacks, especially different flavors of the Maiubō (based on the real life Umaibō). He is usually lazy and unmotivated with everything except snacks, but has also occasionally shown a competitive side that hates to lose. He is somewhat absent-minded and immature, such as falling for obvious taunts and only willing to obey someone stronger than him. He also has a childish malice for tryhards like Kiyoshi, whom he sees as struggling in futility without the natural talent.
Tatsuya Himuro (氷室 辰也, Himuro Tatsuya)
Voiced by: Kishō Taniyama (Japanese); Howard Wang (English)
The other ace in Yōsen's basketball team and shooting guard, Himuro was Kagami's mentor and rival in the United States. Originally around the same level of skill as Kagami, he has since apparently evolved to equal the members of the Generation of Miracles. Though little of his playing has been seen, he possesses uncannily beautiful shooting form, and the ability to make pro-level fakes that are very realistic that Kagami and even Aomine fell for it, allowing him to easily slip through an opponent's defense. His signature move is the Mirage Shot, in which he shoots and the ball seems to pass through the defender easily, by combining his perfect fakes and throwing the ball in the air twice, fooling the defender that Himuro simply shot twice. It is stated even if the blocker figures out the trick behind the move, jumping later with the goal of blocking the real shot is useless, as Himuro can see that, adapt and shoot sooner, which the blocker will be too late for-which is advantageous to Himuro. Aside from basketball, he is also a skilled fighter, holding off Haizaki from Alex on his own. Usually collected and quietly friendly, he is said to be willing to do anything to fulfill his objectives. In America, they call each other brothers, Himuro being the older one. However, when Kagami starts to beat him in games, he doesn't want to be the big brother. After Kagami discovered the secret of the Mirage Shot, deeming it useless, Himuro had an emotional fest; believing he could never surpass his " younger brother". He admits that he is jealous of Kagami's abilities. He dislikes the fact that despite being the one who introduced Kagami to basketball, he himself is not naturally "gifted" like Kagami. Kise also said that he lacks enough talent to enter the "zone". However in the Winter Cup, Kagami and Himuro make up and happily accept one another as rivals and brothers. His voice actor is the lead vocalist of the band GRANRODEO, which performs 6 openings in the series.

=== Rakuzan High ===
Seijūrō Akashi (赤司 征十郎, Akashi Seijūrō)
Voiced by: Hiroshi Kamiya (Japanese); Aleks Le (English)
Akashi is a freshman at Rakuzan High and the captain of its national champion basketball team. He was the captain and leader of the "Generation of Miracles" and plays the point guard position. Akashi is the heir to one of the most prominent families in Japan and he was raised in an extremely demanding environment by his father, causing him to develop an absolute winner-takes-all philosophy. He believes that winning is the only validation and losers are denied everything. He is usually polite and mild-mannered, but the extreme pressure and emphasis on excelling in all areas made him develop a second personality that is cold, ruthless and domineering, with a singular focus on victory. He has never lost before in his life, and therefore believe himself to be right and justified in all things. He is very influential as the team captain in both Teiko and Rakuzan, making all the key decisions from who is promoted to the regular team to what plays to make on the court. Players and coaches alike, including the "Generation of Miracles", respect his decisions without question. He is highly intelligent and analytical, and likes to play Shogi in his spare time.
Akashi's ability "Emperor Eye" allows him to perfectly read and predict movements, which is likened to seeing into the future. As a result, he can easily steal the ball or ankle-break opponents by shifting their center of gravity. In another application, "Emperor Eye" allows him to create "Perfect-Rhythmed Plays" with his own team, which draws out his teammates' true potential close to that of the Zone.
Kotarō Hayama (葉山 小太郎, Hayama Kotarō)
Voiced by: Toshiki Masuda (Japanese); Matt Shipman (English)
Hayama is one of the Uncrowned Kings. He is very energetic and often fools around carelessly. His specialty is dribbling, with his ball control on such a high level, that he actually presses the ball downwards with enough force for it to explode perfectly into a quick cross-over. Because he slams the ball so fiercely onto the ground, it becomes too fast for the eyes to follow, making it very hard to steal. It is seen when he dribbles, he only uses his fingers, channeling the strength of his whole body to his fingers to dribble with more force. It is also shown that the noise his dribble made is loud enough to be heard by spectators that forced them to cover their ears. It is called the Lightning Dribble. He can also perform a near-perfect double clutch, dive under the defender and lay it in. His seemingly wild reflexes have been compared by players to that of a cheetah's. Being overly conceited and underestimating his opponent, Hayama was beaten by Izuki Shun and became enraged, affecting his play negatively. Furthermore, he is the only one who laughed at Izuki's puns. He is nicknamed "Thunder Beast" due to his speed.
Reo Mibuchi (実渕 玲央, Mibuchi Reo)
Voiced by: Wataru Hatano (Japanese); JP Karliak (English)
Mibuchi is another one of the Uncrowned Kings of Rakuzan. Mibuchi is pretty uptight. He likes to keep things in line and gets annoyed easily when others fool around or act weird. He criticizes them and tries to correct them, but is not always successful. He is Rakuzan's best shooter, and one of the best in the series, only surpassed by Midorima. Hyuuga patterned his shooting style to him, to the point of being in awe of his shots. It seems that Mibuchi wants as many points as possible, as he commented that he is quite greedy and can make 3 or 4 points in one play. He has three types of shooting forms, which are named: "Earth", "Heaven", and "Void". The "Heaven" is a simple fade-away shot, while the "Earth" shooting form is a foul-drawing technique. The "Void" is a shooting form that disables the defender from doing anything, however, Mibuchi only uses this when he faces an opponent he acknowledges. Because of his acknowledgement to Hyuga, he used his "Void" to gain the upper hand. However, it doesn't end there, as Hyuga discovered the weaknesses of his shooting forms and managed to fight back. Mibuchi states that he has a crush on one of his own team members in an extra. His nickname is the "Demon Guardian".
Eikichi Nebuya (根武谷 永吉, Nebuya Eikichi)
Voiced by: Takahiro Fujiwara (Japanese); Imari Williams (English)
The final member of the Uncrowned Kings of Rakuzan. He is 190 cm tall and has a well-muscled body, as he believes that brute strength is enough to beat his opponents. Nebuya is a glutton who is shown to be able to eat comparable amounts to or even more than Kagami, and owes his spot to Akashi, who discovered and exploited his potential. He claims that he gets more power when he eats meat and even overeats before a game. Also, he believes that "muscles improve everything"- the main reason he decided to get buffer. He is often called "Muscle Gorilla" because he loves to add the word "muscle" while playing such as 'muscle screen-out', 'muscle rebound' and 'muscle dunk' though it appears that these are just normal plays but with raw power, which gives him great advantage in the post, allowing him to easily overpower centers like Kiyoshi or Otsubo. He also has a decent speed to back up his strong build. He's known as the "Herculean Strength".
Chihiro Mayuzumi (黛 千尋, Mayuzumi Chihiro)
Voiced by: Ryōta Ōsaka (Japanese); Kyle McCarley (English)
Mayuzumi was put on Rakuzan's strong team for a sole reason: he possesses the rare ability of misdirection. Akashi trained him to be like Kuroko, but with finer skills. The reason for this is that Mayuzumi has solid basketball fundamentals whereas Kuroko's general basketball skills are below average, this allows him to score normally, when Kuroko can't. However unlike Kuroko, Mayuzumi doesn't use flashy moves, enabling himself to draw less attention to himself. Mayuzumi claims to pass only for himself and is short-tempered. Without misdirection Mayuzumi is an average player and becomes his teammates' topic of insult, affecting his abilities negatively.

=== Kirisaki Daīchi High ===
Makoto Hanamiya (花宮 真, Hanamiya Makoto)
Voiced by: Jun Fukuyama (Japanese); Stephen Fu (English)
Hanamiya is the coach and captain of the Kirisaki Daīchi team and the final Uncrowned King. An intelligent and shrewd point guard, his dishonest and underhanded playing style has earned him the nickname "Bad Boy" (悪童, Akudō). He was the cause of Kiyoshi's knee injury in the previous year. Hanamiya's skill is analyzing the possible passing and attack patterns of an opposing team he has observed, swooping down the passing line and stealing the ball. He can do this by narrowing down the pass courses with the help of his fellow teammate Kentaro Seto positioning himself in the main passing lanes in order to force the opposing point guard into a risky pass course Hanamiya can predict, allowing Hanamiya to steal every single ball. This is referred to as Hanamiya's Spider Web. According to Kiyoshi, Hanamiya's stealing accuracy is insanely high, even stealing Izuki's passes, a possessor of the "Eagle Eye". His foul methods and underhanded play have misled players to underestimate him in offense, but Hanamiya has proven this to be wrong, even pulling off a difficult teardrop shot. He claims that he that doesn't want to win that badly with his foul methods, and that is to simply make the other suffer.

=== Others ===
Kagetora Aida (相田 景虎, Aida Kagetora)
Voiced by: Shin-ichiro Miki (Japanese); Keith Silverstein (English)
Riko's father, he used to play on a Japanese professional basketball team. He has the same ability as his daughter Riko, to estimate a person's capability, from height to muscle mass and flexibility, just by visually scanning their body.
Alexandra Garcia (アレクサンドラ・ガルシア, Arekusandora Garushia)
Voiced by: Yuki Kaida (Japanese); Allegra Clark (English)
A charismatic American who was Kagami and Himuro's basketball teacher when they lived in the US. She is a former WNBA player and now teaches kids basketball in the local neighborhood. She studied the Japanese language with the help of Kagami, and can speak Japanese fluently with ease. She traveled to Japan to watch Kagami and Himuro face off in the Winter Cup. She has a habit of greeting people with a kiss, surprising all but her former students. She treats her two students as if they were her own sons and loves them both because they inspired her to teach basketball to kids. In an extra, she stated that she would choose between Kagami and Himuro when they've grown older.
Shigehiro Ogiwara (荻原 シゲヒロ, Ogiwara Shigehiro)
Voiced by: Hayashi Yuu (Japanese); Bryce Papenbrook (English)
Kuroko's childhood friend who quit basketball after being severely defeated by Teiko's Generation of Miracles. He is kind and supportive to Kuroko, telling him to continue playing even though he, himself, quit basketball. In the final of the Winter Cup, Ogiwara is the one who changes the game's momentum; yelling encouragement to Kuroko when Kuroko was at the brink of defeat. Kuroko then discovers that Ogiwara regained his passion for basketball and is overjoyed.
