= Kuroko's Basketball discography =

- EPs: 1
- Soundtrack albums: 3
- Singles: 45

A number of musical CDs have been created for the media franchise built around Tadatoshi Fujimaki's manga Kuroko's Basketball. Various theme songs and character songs were released on singles. One extended play and three soundtrack have also been released.

The anime television series consists of seven opening themes and seven ending themes.

== EPs ==
Year	Title	Charts		Ref.
Year	Title	Peak	Weeks	Ref.
2013	Seirin Kōkō Mini Album (誠凛高校ミニアルバム, Seirin High Mini Album): Released: December 11, 2012; Label: Lantis	24	5	

== Singles ==
Year	Title	Artist	Charts		Ref.
Year	Title	Artist	Peak	Weeks	Ref.
2012	"Can Do": Released: April 18, 2012; Label: Lantis; Used as the opening theme for episodes 1–13	GRANRODEO	14	20	
2012	"Start It Right Away": Released: May 9, 2012; Label: Lantis; Used as the ending theme for episodes 1–13	Hyadain	27	12	
2012	"Character Song Solo Series Vol.1": Released: May 23, 2012; Label: Lantis	Tetsuya Kuroko (Kenshō Ono)	24	24	
2012	"Character Song Solo Series Vol.2": Released: May 23, 2012; Label: Lantis	Taiga Kagami (Yūki Ono)	30	18	
2012	"Character Song Solo Series Vol.3": Released: May 23, 2012; Label: Lantis	Ryōta Kise (Ryōhei Kimura)	22	25	
2012	"Character Song Solo Series Vol.4": Released: June 20, 2012; Label: Lantis	Shintarō Midorima (Daisuke Ono)	11	17	
2012	"Character Song Solo Series Vol.5": Released: June 20, 2012; Label: Lantis	Kazunari Takao (Tatsuhisa Suzuki)	9	15	
2012	"RIMFIRE": Released: July 18, 2012; Label: Lantis; Used as the opening theme for episodes 14–25	GRANRODEO	11	9	
2012	"Catal Rhythm" (カタルリズム, Katarurizumu): Released: August 8, 2012; Label: Lantis; Used as the ending theme for episodes 14–25	OLDCODEX	20	10	
2012	"Character Song Duet Series Vol.1": Released: August 29, 2012; Label: Lantis	Tetsuya Kuroko (Kenshō Ono) & Taiga Kagami (Yūki Ono)	12	9	
2012	"Character Song Duet Series Vol.2": Released: August 29, 2012; Label: Lantis	Tetsuya Kuroko (Kenshō Ono) & Ryōta Kise (Ryōhei Kimura)	9	12	
2012	"Character Song Solo Series Vol.6": Released: September 12, 2012; Label: Lantis	Junpei Hyūga (Yoshimasa Hosoya)	12	7	
2012	"Character Song Solo Series Vol.7": Released: September 12, 2012; Label: Lantis	Shun Izuki (Hirofumi Nojima)	13	6	
2012	"Character Song Solo Series Vol.8": Released: September 12, 2012; Label: Lantis	Shinji Koganei (Takuya Eguchi)	17	5	
2012	"Character Song Duet Series Vol.3": Released: September 26, 2012; Label: Lantis	Shintarō Midorima (Daisuke Ono) & Kazunari Takao (Tatsuhisa Suzuki)	3	16	
2012	"Character Song Solo Series Vol.9": Released: December 5, 2012; Label: Lantis	Daiki Aomine (Junichi Suwabe)	8	7	
2012	"Character Song Solo Series Vol.10": Released: December 5, 2012; Label: Lantis	Teppei Kiyoshi (Kenji Hamada)	12	5	
2012	"Character Song Solo Series Vol.11": Released: December 5, 2012; Label: Lantis	Yukio Kasamatsu (Sōichirō Hoshi)	10	7	
2012	"Character Song Solo Series Vol.12": Released: December 5, 2012; Label: Lantis	Riko Aida (Chiwa Saitō) / Satsuki Momoi (Fumiko Orikasa)	19	5	
2013	"Character Song Duet Series Vol.4": Released: March 27, 2013; Label: Lantis	Tetsuya Kuroko (Kenshō Ono) & Daiki Aomine (Junichi Suwabe)	7	6	
2013	"Character Song Duet Series Vol.5": Released: March 27, 2013; Label: Lantis	Junpei Hyūga (Yoshimasa Hosoya) & Teppei Kiyoshi(Kenji Hamada)	12	4	
2013	"The Other Self": Released: October 16, 2013; Label: Lantis; Used as the opening theme for episodes 26–38	GRANRODEO	10	15	
2013	"Walk": Released: November 13, 2013; Label: Lantis; Used as the ending theme for episodes 26–38	OLDCODEX	18	10	
2013	"Character Song Solo Series Vol.13": Released: November 27, 2013; Label: Lantis	Tatsuya Himuro (Kishō Taniyama)	20	8	
2013	"Character Song Solo Series Vol.14": Released: November 27, 2013; Label: Lantis	Makoto Hanamiya (Jun Fukuyama)	21	9	
2014	"Character Song Duet Series Vol.6": Released: January 8, 2014; Label: Lantis	Tetsuya Kuroko (Kenshō Ono) & Shintarō Midorima (Daisuke Ono)	5	5	
2014	"Character Song Duet Series Vol.7": Released: January 8, 2014; Label: Lantis	Taiga Kagami (Yūki Ono) & Daiki Aomine (Junichi Suwabe)	3	5	
2014	"Hengen Jizai no Magical Star" (変幻自在のマジカルスター): Released: February 12, 2014; Label: Lantis; Used as the opening theme for episodes 39–49	GRANRODEO			
2014	"FANTASTIC TUNE": Released: February 26, 2014; Label: Lantis; Used as the ending theme for episodes 39–50	Kenshō Ono			
2014	"Character Song Solo Series Vol.15": Released: March 5, 2014; Label: Lantis	Ryō Sakurai (Nobunaga Shimazaki)			
2014	"Character Song Solo Series Vol.16": Released: March 5, 2014; Label: Lantis	Atsushi Murasakibara (Kenichi Suzumura)			
2014	"Character Song Duet Series Vol.8": Released: April 16, 2014; Label: Lantis	Atsushi Murasakibara (Kenichi Suzumura) & Tatsuya Himuro (Kishō Taniyama)			
2015	"Punky Funky Love": Released: January 28, 2015; Label: Lantis; Used as the opening theme for episodes 51–62	GRANRODEO			
2015	"GLITTER DAYS": Released: February 4, 2015; Label: Lantis; Used as the ending theme for episodes 51–61	Fo'xTails			
2015	"Character Song Duet Series Vol.9": Released: February 5, 2015; Label: Lantis	Tetsuya Kuroko (Kenshō Ono) & Atsushi Murasakibara (Kenichi Suzumura)			
2015	"Character Song Duet Series Vol.10": Released: February 25, 2015; Label: Lantis	Taiga Kagami (Yūki Ono) & Tatsuya Himuro (Kishō Taniyama)			
2015	"Character Song Duet Series Vol.11": Released: March 25, 2015; Label: Lantis	Ryōta Kise (Ryōhei Kimura) & Yukio Kasamatsu (Sōichirō Hoshi)			
2015	"Character Song Solo Series Vol.17": Released: March 25, 2015; Label: Lantis	Shogo Haizaki (Masakazu Morita)			
2015	"ZERO": Released: April 8, 2015; Label: Lantis; Used as the opening theme for episodes 63–66	Kenshō Ono			
2015	"Ambivalence": Released: April 8, 2015; Label: Lantis; Used as the ending theme for episodes 63–66	SCREEN mode			
2015	"Teiko Middle School Single": Released: April 29, 2015; Label: Lantis	Tetsuya Kuroko (Kenshō Ono); Ryōta Kise (Ryōhei Kimura); Shintarō Midorima (Daisuke Ono); Daiki Aomine (Junichi Suwabe); Atsushi Murasakibara (Kenichi Suzumura); Seijuro Akashi (Hiroshi Kamiya)			
2015	"Memories": Released: June 3, 2015; Label: Lantis; Used as the opening theme for episodes 67–75	GRANRODEO			
2015	"Lantana": Released: June 10, 2015; Label: Lantis; Used as the ending theme for episodes 67–75	OLDCODEX			
2015	"Character Song Duet Series Vol.12": Released: July 8, 2015; Label: Lantis	Taiga Kagami (Yūki Ono) & Tetsuya Kuroko (Kenshō Ono)			
2015	"Character Song Solo Series Vol.18": Released: July 8, 2015; Label: Lantis	Seijuro Akashi (Hiroshi Kamiya)			

== Soundtrack ==
Year	Title	Charts		Ref.
Year	Title	Peak	Weeks	Ref.
2012	Kuroko's Basketball Original Soundtrack (『黒子のバスケ』オリジナルサウンドトラック): Released: December 11, 2012; Label: Lantis	40	2	
2014	Kuroko's Basketball Original Soundtrack Vol. 2 (『黒子のバスケ』オリジナルサウンドトラック Vol.2): Released: May 14, 2014; Label: Lantis			
2015	Kuroko's Basketball Original Soundtrack Vol. 3 (『黒子のバスケ』オリジナルサウンドトラック Vol.3): Released: July 29, 2015; Label: Lantis			
