= Takashi Masada =

Japanese screenwriter

- 正田 崇
- Born: October 31, 1975 (age 50); Yamaguchi Prefecture, Japan
- Occupations: Game scenario writer, novelist
- Years active: 2004–present
- Notable work: Dies irae, Shinza Bansho Series

Takashi Masada (Japanese: 正田 崇, Masada Takashi, born October 31) is a Japanese video game scenario writer and novelist. He is a prominent independent creator and the great-grandson of the historical Japanese anarchists Sakae Ōsugi and Noe Itō. He is best known for creating the Shinza Bansho Series a shared universe of dark fantasy visual novels and light novels.

== Career ==
After changing jobs several times, Masada made his professional debut as a scenario writer in 2004 with the release of the visual novel PARADISE LOST under the game studio Light (a brand of Greenwood).

In 2009, his visual noveDies irae ~Acta est Fabula~l received the Silver Award in the Scenario Category at the Moe Game Awards 2010. Later in 2014, Soushuu Senshinkan Gakuen: Hachimyoujin won the Gold Award in the "Moe Game Category" at the Moe Game Awards 2014.

Following the dissolution and closure of Greenwood (Light) in March 2019, Masada became a freelance creator. In September 2019, he partnered with long-time illustrator G-Yuusuke to serialize the light novel series Avesta of Black and White initially on the platforms Enty and Fantia. In December 2019, they formed the independent doujin circle "Shinza Bansho Dai-Juyon Kikan" (神座万象・第十四機関) to publish physical compiled volumes.

After completing Avesta on July 16, 2021, Masada announced his next project, Jishou Chihei Sensen Aditya (事象地平戦線アーディティヤ), which began serialization in February 2022. In February 2025, he temporarily paused *Aditya* to begin serializing a new project titled Dies Entelecheia.

== Works ==
=== Video Games ===
- PARADISE LOST (Light, 2004)
- Dear My Friend (Light, 2004) – Wheat route
- Dies irae -Also sprach Zarathustra- (Light, 2007)
  - Dies irae Also sprach Zarathustra -die Wiederkunft- (Light, 2009)
  - Dies irae 〜Acta est Fabula〜 (Light, 2009)
  - Dies irae 〜Amantes amentes〜 (PSP/PC, 2012)
  - Dies irae 〜Interview with Kaziklu Bey〜 (Light, 2016)
- Kajiri Kamui Kagura (Light, 2011)
  - Kajiri Kamui Kagura: Akebono no Hikari (PS Vita, 2013)
- Soushuu Senshinkan Gakuen: Hachimyoujin (Light, 2014)
  - Soushuu Senshinkan Gakuen: Hachimyoujin - Ten no Toki (PS Vita, 2014)
- Soushuu Senshinkan Gakuen: Manshenjin (Light, 2015)

=== Anime ===
- Dies irae (2017) – Series Composition, Scriptwriter

=== Drama CDs ===
- Dies irae Todestag Verloren (Light, 2015)
- Soushuu Senshinkan Gakuen: Chusenjin (Light, 2015)
- Llywelyn Shinden (螺湮城新伝) (2016)

=== Light Novels ===
- Avesta of Black and White (黒白のアヴェスター) (2019–2021)
- Event horizon battlefront: Aditya (事象地平戦線アーディティヤ) (2022–2025)
- Dies Entelecheia (2025–present)
