= Instinct (Granrodeo album) =

Studio album by Granrodeo
- Released: 26 September 2008
- Genre: Rock
- Length: 63:33
- Label: Lantis
- Producer: E-Zuka

Granrodeo chronology
Ride on the Edge (2007)	Instinct (2008)	Brush the Scar Lemon (2009)

Instinct is the second album of Japanese rock band, Granrodeo. It was released on 26 September 2008.

== Song information ==
- "Heaven" was used as the ending theme to the 2007 anime television series Kotetsushin Jeeg.
- "delight song" – The band's first non-tie-up Maxi-single.
- "Not for Sale" was used as the theme to the 2008 Game "Duel Love".
- "Detarame na Zanzō" (デタラメな残像) was used as the opening theme to the 2008 anime television series Blassreiter.
- "Darlin'" – a Single cut on 10 December the same year..

== Track listing ==
All lyrics are written by KISHOW; all music is composed by e-ZUKA.

No.	Title	Length
1.	"Black out"	4:31
2.	"Detarame na Zanzō (デタラメな残像)"	4:06
3.	"Darlin'"	4:27
4.	"CANNON★BALL"	5:13
5.	"Amai Itami wa Gensō no Hate ni (甘い痛みは幻想の果てに)"	4:41
6.	"Outsider (アウトサイダー)"	5:04
7.	"Instinct" (Instrumental)	0:46
8.	"Aisubeki STUPID (愛すべきSTUPID)"	5:50
9.	"Koko ni Aru Nukumori (ここにあるぬくもり)"	6:28
10.	"HEAVEN"	4:10
11.	"NOT for SALE"	4:50
12.	"delight song"	5:42
13.	"Beautiful world"	7:41
Total length:		63:36

== Personnel ==
- Kishow: vocals, lyrics
- E-Zuka: lead guitar, backing vocals, Arranging

== Charts ==
Chart	Peak position
Oricon Weekly Albums	18
