= Ride on the Edge =

Studio album by Granrodeo
- Released: 25 July 2007
- Genre: Rock
- Length: 69:04
- Label: Lantis
- Producer: E-Zuka

Granrodeo chronology
| Ride on the Edge (2007) | Instinct (2008) |

Singles from Ride on the Edge
- 1. "Go For It!" Released: 23 November 2005; 2. "Infinite Love" Released: 26 July 2006; 3. "DECADENCE" Released: 23 August 2006; 4. "Dōkoku no Ame" Released: 24 January 2007

Ride on the Edge (stylized as RIDE ON THE EDGE) is the debut album of Japanese rock band, Granrodeo. It was released on 25 July 2007.

It is composed with songs from Game and Anime and Insert Song, but it is also contains original songs. Many songs have been released as singles, for this album, some songs were a re-remake.

== Song Information ==
- "Go For It!" was used as the opening theme to the 2005 anime television series IGPX.
- "Infinite Love" was used as the opening theme to the 2006 TV Season 1 anime "Koi suru Tenshi Angelique".
- "Decadence" was used as the ending theme to the 2006 anime television series Demon Prince Enma.
- "Dōkoku no Ame" (慟哭ノ雨)) was used as the opening theme to the 2007 Season 2 anime television series "Koi suru Tenshi Angelique".
- "style GR" mark the remake of 2 previously written songs by the band:
  - "Mikansei no GUILTY" (未完成のGUILTY) was used as a Character song in the Kimi ga Nozomu Eien series, sung by Takayuki Narumi starring Kishō Taniyama (also made by Kishō and Masaaki).
  - "Last Smile" was used as an extra song to the Character song in the Kimi ga Nozomu Eien series, also sung by Kishō Taniyama (also made by Kishō and Masaaki).

== Track listing ==
All music is composed by e-ZUKA

| No. | Title | Lyrics | Length |
|---|---|---|---|
| 1. | "RIDE ON..." (Instrumental) | – | 1:00 |
| 2. | "Dōkoku no Ame (慟哭ノ雨))" | KISHOW | 3:48 |
| 3. | "Infinite Love" | KISHOW | 4:04 |
| 4. | "Mikansei no GUILTY "style GR" (未完成のGUILTY "style GR")" | KISHOW | 5:13 |
| 5. | "Silhouette (シルエット)" | KISHOW | 4:36 |
| 6. | "Go For It!" | mavie | 4:04 |
| 7. | "059/21" | KISHOW | 5:13 |
| 8. | "Murasaki Honō (紫炎)" | KISHOW | 4:42 |
| 9. | "EDGE OF..." (Instrumental) | – | 0:48 |
| 10. | "RIDE ON THE EDGE" | KISHOW | 5:11 |
| 11. | "LAST SMILE "style GR"" | KISHOW | 5:12 |
| 12. | "DECADENCE" | KISHOW | 5:00 |
| 13. | "Vanessa" | KISHOW | 1:13 |
| 14. | "mistake" | KISHOW | 3:52 |
| 15. | "Once&Forever" | KISHOW | 4:39 |
| 16. | "Kenzen na Honnō (ケンゼンな本能)" | KISHOW | 4:16 |
| 17. | "Two of us" | KISHOW | 4:46 |
| Total length: | | | 69:04 |

== Personnel ==
- Kishow: vocals, lyrics
- E-Zuka: lead guitar, backing vocals, Arranging

== Cover ==
"Infinite Love" was covered by Sid respectively, on the 2020 Granrodeo tribute album Rodeo Freak.

== Charts ==
| Chart | Peak position | Sales |
|---|---|---|
| Oricon Weekly Albums | 26 | — |
