= Karma to Labyrinth =

Studio album by Granrodeo
- Released: 24 September 2014
- Recorded: 2012–2014
- Genre: Rock
- Length: 66:59
- Label: Lantis
- Producer: E-Zuka

Granrodeo chronology
Crack Star Flash (2012)	Karma to Labyrinth (2014)	Pierrot Dancin' (2017)

Singles from Supernova
- 1. "DARK SHAME" Released: 11 November 2012; 2. "Henai no Rondo" Released: 17 April 2013; 3. "The Other self" Released: 16 October 2013; 4. "Hengenjizai no Magical Star" Released: 12 February 2014

Karma to Labyrinth (カルマとラビリンス, Karma and Labyrinth) is the sixth album of Japanese rock band, Granrodeo. It was released on 24 September 2014.

== Song information ==
- "DARK SHAME" was used as the opening theme to the 2012 anime television series Code:Breaker.
- "Henai No Rondo" was used as the opening theme to the 2013 anime television series Karneval.
- "The Other Self" was used as the 1st opening theme to the 2013 anime television series "Kuroko's Basketball 2".
- "Hengenjizai no Magical Star" was used as the second opening theme to the 2013 anime television series "Kuroko's Basketball 2".
- "Sakura-iro dai 2 Button" was added as an insert song for the single "Henai no Rondo".
- "baby bad boy" was added as an insert song for the single "The Other self".
- "DAWN GATE" was added as an insert song for the single "The Other self".
- "Zetchou Poison" was added as an insert song for the single "Hengenjizai no Magical Star".

== Track listing ==
All lyrics are written by KISHOW; all music is composed by e-ZUKA

No.	Title	Length
1.	"Blue Pandora Box"	2:19
2.	"silence"	5:40
3.	"Hengenjizai no Magical Star (変幻自在のマジカルスター)"	4:42
4.	"Volcano (ボルケーノ)"	5:12
5.	"DARK SHAME"	4:50
6.	"baby bad boy"	4:17
7.	"The Other self"	4:45
8.	"Sakura-iro dai 2 Button (桜色第2ボタン)"	6:32
9.	"Henai no Rondo (偏愛の輪舞曲)"	4:10
10.	"Zetchou Poison (絶頂ポイズン)"	4:43
11.	"Pink Phantom"	4:36
12.	"wonder color"	5:18
13.	"DAWN GATE"	9:50
Total length:		66:59

== Personnel ==
- Kishow: vocals, lyrics
- E-Zuka: lead guitar, backing vocals, Arranging

== Cover ==
"The Other self" and "Henai no Rondo" were covered by Breakerz and Takanori Nishikawa respectively, on the 2020 Granrodeo tribute album Rodeo Freak.
