= Dies irae (video game) =

Japanese visual novel video game

- Japanese Amantes amentes Windows cover art
- Developer: Light
- Publisher: Views
- Producer: Hattori Michisato
- Artist: G-Yuusuke
- Writer: Takashi Masada
- Composer: Keishi Yonao
- Platforms: Microsoft Windows, PlayStation Portable, Android, iOS, Nintendo Switch
- Release: December 21, 2007: Also sprach Zarathustra; JP: December 21, 2007 (Win) Acta est Fabula; JP: December 25, 2009 (Win) Amantes amentes; JP: June 28, 2012 (PSP); JP: August 31, 2012 (Win); JP: August 19, 2015 (Android); JP: December 2, 2016 (iOS); WW: June 2, 2017 (Win); JP: October 18, 2018 (NS); WW: TBA (PSV)
- Genre: Visual novel
- Mode: Single-player

Dies irae (Japanese: ディエス・イレ, Hepburn: Diesu Ire) is a visual novel video game developed by Light, originally released in 2007 in Japan. A TV anime adaptation, Dies Irae, premiered in October 2017.

== Gameplay ==
Gameplay from Acta est Fabula, showing character artwork along with text representing narration

As in most visual novels, the gameplay mostly consists of reading text on the screen (representing narration or dialogue) accompanied by images showing characters and locations. At certain points in the story, the player can choose options which influence the path, or "route", the story takes, as well as the ending of the story.

== Synopsis ==
Prior to the events of the story, the Longinus Dreizehn Orden, a group of sorcerers, perform a ritual in Berlin during World War II, using the lives lost in battle as a sacrifice for their spell. After the war ends, they disappear, but are rumored to return. In present-day Japan, Ren Fuji is released from the hospital after recovering from a brawl with his friend Shirou, when the Longinus Dreizehn Orden returns.

== Development and release ==
Dies irae was developed by Light, and was produced by Hattori Michisato and written by Takashi Masada, with art by G-Yuusuke and music by Keishi Yonao. It was developed during the 2000s PC boom in Japan, when the audience of Japanese video game players on Microsoft Windows grew, and the introduction of simpler development tools lowered the barrier of entry. Light experimented with games at the time, and created things they wanted to make; after developing Paradise Lost, they decided they wanted to make a serious game themed around battles, which led to the creation of Dies irae. Michisato described the game's theme as "the reason to fight for and protect your loved ones", and "the stubborn pride of men".

Development was challenging, leading to the game being released unfinished; this first version was released on December 2, 2007 for Microsoft Windows with the subtitle Also sprach Zarathustra. Development continued, and a second version, Acta est Fabula, was released on December 25, 2009; the game was not completed until its third version, Amantes amentes, which was released on June 28, 2012 for PlayStation Portable and on August 31 of the same year for Microsoft Windows. To show gratitude to users who bought the original releases despite them being incomplete, Light included 200-page fan books with each new release, which were not made available to purchase in book stores. Amantes amentes was later ported to smartphones, and was released for Android on August 19, 2015 and for iOS on December 2, 2016.

A Nintendo Switch version of Amantes amentes, which includes an additional scenario that serves as a prequel to the mobile game Dies irae Pantheon. Dies irae Pantheon was planned for release in Japan on October 18, 2018. Dies irae Pantheon was later cancelled. The Nintendo Switch version, which is developed by Greenwood, was delayed from the originally announced release date of September 27, 2018 due to bugs being found late in development, releasing instead on October 18, 2018 and coinciding with the original release date of Pantheon. The Nintendo Switch version also features a new opening theme, "Einsatz～zugabe～", a remix of the original opening theme "Einsatz" from Acta est Fabula.

Amantes amentes has not been fan translated, something Michisato attributed to the story's length and complexity. An official English localization was worked on by a team led by the American translator John Hooper, who had previously worked on the localization of Root Double: Before Crime * After Days, and had approached Light with the proposal to localize Dies irae. In addition to the translation, the localization team handled the debugging of the English release and advised Light on what kind of merchandise would appeal to American players.

== Reception ==
Also sprach Zarathustra was the twelfth best selling PC game of 2007 on the web shop Getchu; Acta est Fabula was the twenty-fifth of 2009. The PlayStation Portable version of Amantes amentes sold a total of 5,669 copies during its debut week, making it the third best selling PlayStation Portable game of the week in Japan, and twentieth best-selling game in Japan across all systems. By May 2017, over 100,000 copies of Dies irae had been sold across all versions.

The game has won awards: Also sprach Zarathustra was given an Award of Excellence in the Background Music Division of the 2008 Bishoujo Game Awards, and Acta est Fabula won the gold award in the background music category in the 2010 Moe Game Awards.

According to Michisato, users were upset by the initial, incomplete releases.

== Other media ==
Media based on the game has been released: a manga adaptation by Kazuomi Minatogawa started serialization on January 27, 2016 in the March 2016 issue of Kadokawa Corporation's Dengeki Maoh until it came to an abrupt end in July 2019; a novelization by Ryō Morise was released in early 2016; and an anime adaptation, titled Dies Irae, began broadcast in 2017. A spin-off video game, Dies irae: Interview with Kaziklu Bey, was released in Japan in March 2016, and internationally on February 28, 2019. A mobile game, Dies irae Pantheon, was in development by Super Appli, with a scenario by Masada and art by G-Yuusuke. Dies irae Pantheon was planned for release in Q4 2017 in Japan—however, development was canceled after Light was forced to close its doors due to three changes in development companies for the game. Light had initially expressed interest in an English localization of the smartphone game before its cancelation.

== See also ==
- Kajiri Kamui Kagura
- Avesta of black and white
