= Crack Star Flash =

Studio album by Granrodeo
- Released: 10 October 2012
- Recorded: 2011–2012
- Genre: Rock
- Length: 63:49
- Label: Lantis
- Producer: E-Zuka

Granrodeo chronology
SUPERNOVA (2011)	Crack Star Flash (2012)	Karma to Labyrinth (2014)

Singles from Supernova
- 1. "Ai no Warrior" Released: 23 November 2011; 2. "Can Do" Released: 18 April 2012; 3. "RIMFIRE" Released: 18 July 2012

Crack Star Flash (stylized as CRACK STAR FLASH) is the fifth album of Japanese rock band, Granrodeo. It was released on 10 October 2012.

== Song Information ==
- "Ai no Warrior" was used as the opening theme to the 2011 Game Angelique: Maren no Rokukishi.
- "Can Do" was used as the 1st opening theme to the 2012 anime television "Kuroko's Basketball".
- "RIMFIRE" was used as the 2nd opening theme to the 2012 anime television "Kuroko's Basketball".
- "HAPPY LIFE" was added as an insert song for the single "Ai no Warrior".
- "Mesmerise" was added as an insert song for the single "Can Do".
- "Urban Sweet" was added as an insert song for the single "RIMFIRE".

== Track listing ==
All lyrics are written by KISHOW; all music is composed by e-ZUKA

No.	Title	Length
1.	"CRACK STAR FLASH"	4:54
2.	"Can Do"	5:19
3.	"NO PLACE LIKE A STAGE"	4:48
4.	"Urban Sweet"	5:17
5.	"Merry-Go-Round (メリーゴーランド)"	5:14
6.	"Mesmerise (メズマライズ)"	5:58
7.	"HAPPY LIFE"	6:49
8.	"RIMFIRE"	4:38
9.	"0-GRAVITY"	4:33
10.	"Sameyukunetsu (冷めゆく熱)"	6:15
11.	"Ai no Warrior (愛のWarrior)"	4:20
12.	"Kibou no kanata e (希望の彼方へ)"	6:36
Total length:		63:49

== Personnel ==
- Kishow: vocals, lyrics
- E-Zuka: lead guitar, backing vocals, Arranging

== Cover ==
FLOW covered "Can Do" on their 15th anniversary tour Anime Shibari in 2018.

"Can Do" and "Mesmerize" were covered by Dempagumi.inc and Mucc respectively, on the 2020 Granrodeo tribute album Rodeo Freak.

== Charts ==
Chart	Peak position	Sales
Oricon Weekly Albums	3	-
