= Brush the Scar Lemon =

Studio album by Granrodeo
- Released: 28 October 2009
- Recorded: 2008–2009
- Genre: Rock
- Length: 61:43
- Label: GloryHeaven
- Producer: E-Zuka

Granrodeo chronology
Instinct (2008)	Brush the Scar Lemon (2009)	SUPERNOVA (2011)

Singles from Ride on the Edge
- 1. "tRANCE" Released: 22 April 2009; 2. "modern strange cowboy" Released: 29 July 2009

Brush the Scar Lemon (stylized as BRUSH the SCAR LEMON) is the third album of Japanese rock band, Granrodeo. It was released on 28 October 2009.

== Song information ==
- "tRANCE" was used as the second opening theme to the 2009 anime television Black God.
- "modern strange cowboy" was used as the first opening theme to the 2009 anime television series Needless.
- Songs "Tsuki ni Neko" and "SUGAR" were added as insert songs for the single "Darlin".
- "Canary" was used as the first opening theme the second season of anime Senyu.

== Track listing ==
All lyrics are written by KISHOW; all music is composed by e-ZUKA

No.	Title	Length
1.	"cage" (Instrumental)	0:59
2.	"CANARY (カナリヤ))"	4:33
3.	"tRANCE"	4:48
4.	"Othello (オセロ)"	5:01
5.	"BRUSH the SCAR LEMON"	5:14
6.	"Lonely Fighter (ロンリーファイター)"	4:18
7.	"Tsuki ni Neko (月に猫)"	5:34
8.	"silent DESIRE"	4:27
9.	"SUGAR"	4:59
10.	"Passion"	5:02
11.	"modern strange cowboy"	5:18
12.	"Nantoku Keshita Story (なんとなく消したストーリー)"	6:32
13.	"21st CENTURY LOVERS"	5:09
14.	"point of no return" (Instrumental)	0:52
Total length:		61:43

== Personnel ==
- Kishow: vocals, lyrics
- E-Zuka: lead guitar, backing vocals, Arranging

== Cover ==
"modern strange cowboy" was covered by FLOW on the 2020 Granrodeo tribute album Rodeo Freak.

== Charts ==
Chart	Peak position	Sales
Oricon Weekly Albums	14	-
