= Supernova (Granrodeo album) =

Studio album by Granrodeo
- Released: 6 April 2011
- Recorded: 2009–2011
- Genre: Rock
- Length: 68:07
- Label: GloryHeaven
- Producer: E-Zuka

Granrodeo chronology
Brush the Scar Lemon (2009)	Supernova (2011)	Crack Star Flash (2012)

Singles from Supernova
- 1. "Koi Oto" Released: 9 December 2009; 2. "Rose Hip-Bullet" Released: 27 October 2010

Supernova (stylized as SUPERNOVA) is the fourth album of Japanese rock band, Granrodeo. It was released on 6 April 2011.

== Song Information ==
- "Koi Oto" was released as a single.
- "Rose Hip-Bullet" was used as the 1st opening theme to the 2009 TV anime "Togainu no Chi".
- "Shanimuni" was added as an insert song for the single "Koi Oto"
- "SEA OF STARS" was added as an insert song for the Non–album single "We wanna R&R SHOW"

== Track listing ==
All lyrics are written by KISHOW; all music is composed by e-ZUKA

No.	Title	Length
1.	"rocket ride" (Instrumental)	2:23
2.	"SEED BLASTER"	5:19
3.	"ROSE HIP-BULLET"	4:25
4.	"SUPERNOVA"	4:39
5.	"Boku to Kimi no Aida (僕と君の間)"	5:14
6.	"Who Is The Witch?" (Instrumental)	0:44
7.	"Witch Hunter (ウィッチハンター)"	5:12
8.	"Shinka to Daraku no Nigenron (進化と堕落の二元論)"	6:53
9.	"Uso no Iro (ウソノイロ)"	5:54
10.	"Koi Oto (恋音)"	6:05
11.	"Yokubou (欲望∞)"	4:27
12.	"SEA OF STARS"	5:46
13.	"Shanimuni (シャニムニ)"	4:19
14.	"Haitoku no Kodō (背徳の鼓動)"	6:29
Total length:		68:07

== Personnel ==
- Kishow: vocals, lyrics
- E-Zuka: lead guitar, backing vocals, Arranging

== Charts ==
Chart	Peak position	Sales
Oricon Weekly Albums	13	-
