= Eiji Miyashita =

Japanese voice actor (born 1978)

- 宮下 栄治
- Born: September 26, 1978 (age 47); Hyōgo Prefecture, Japan
- Occupation: Voice actor
- Years active: 2003–present
- Agent: aptepro
- Height: 176 cm (5 ft 9 in)

Eiji Miyashita (宮下 栄治, Miyashita Eiji; born September 26, 1978) is a Japanese voice actor affiliated with Aptepro. His main roles include Kyohei Kashihara in Arpeggio of Blue Steel, Sosuke Sugaya in Assassination Classroom, Hajun in Kajiri Kamui Kagura, Airzel in Bakugan, Papa in Higepiyo, Kenji Ito in Horizon in the Middle of Nowhere, Gen Shishio in Kekkaishi, and Takeo Tsurumaru in Shadow Star.

== Career ==
When Miyashita was a child, he admired Kōichi Yamadera, who played Kurama Wataribe in Mashin Hero Wataru, and decided to become a voice actor in his third year of high school. On the recommendation of his parents, he enrolled in a university in Nara, but he could not give up his dream of becoming a voice actor, so he dropped out after one year and attended Yoyogi Animation Academy in Osaka while working part-time. On the advice of a lecturer at Yoyogi Animation Academy, he entered the training school of Ken Production in the Kanto region, and began working as a voice actor around the age of 22 when he was placed under the care of the office.

In 2007, he attracted attention for playing three completely different types of characters: the role of Gen Shishio in Kekkaishi, the role of Predator in Bakugan Battle Brawlers, and the role of Raphael in Teenage Mutant Ninja Turtles. Afterwards, he left Ken Production in 2008 and worked as a freelancer until June 2009, but after belonging to Production Baobab from July 2009 to August 2011, he started working as a freelancer again in September 2011.

Miyashita has been a member of Aptepro since February 2013. As part of his activities, he has formed a recital theater unit called "Lit Klatch" (formerly "LK VI").

In an interview with Girs-Style, Miyashita said that he doesn't remember exactly the first job he got, but it was probably a Western movie. He recalled that the first role he remembered was an unnamed character in Big Wolf on Campus, and that the first named role was Takeo Tsurumaru in Shadow Star. In the aforementioned interview, Miyashita said that he was advised by a Western film dubbing director to just be there as the character and not to think too much about the role, and he felt that well thought out words are not convincing. He said that he tried to concentrate on the role rather than doing calculations, and that he did not remember much about his roles after performing them.

== Filmography ==
=== Anime ===
2003

- Shadow Star as Takeo Tsurumaru

2005

- Black Cat as Victor
- Immortal Grand Prix as Glass Jones

2006

- Innocent Venus as Kaneda
- Nana as Nakamura
- Yomigaeru Sora – Rescue Wings as Hitoshi Tsujido, Kazushi Sugiura, Oyama, Sawada

2007

- Bakugan Battle Brawlers as Predator
- Dragonaut: The Resonance as Keiichi Amagi
- Kaze no Stigma as Tsang
- Kekkaishi as Gen Shishio
- Reideen as Toshihisa Takahashi
- Romeo × Juliet as Vittorio, Paolo

2008

- Nogizaka Haruka no Himitsu as Nagai

2009

- Black God as Raiga
- The Girl Who Leapt Through Space as Uno, Koga, Wanibuchi
- Nogizaka Haruka no Himitsu: Purezza as Nagai
- Sōten Kōro as Liu Xie
- Yu-Gi-Oh! 5D's as Ramon

2010

- Bakugan Battle Brawlers: New Vestroia as Predator
- Shiki as Sadafumi Tamo

2011

- Bakugan: Gundalian Invaders as Airzel, Lythirius
- Fairy Tail as Hughes
- Fractale as Takamy
- Future Diary as Kobayashi, Detective Suzuki, Itabashi, Mr. Moriya, Rocky, Shiraishi, Ushio Gasai
- Horizon in the Middle of Nowhere as Kenji Ito, Yasumasa Sakakibara
- Last Exile: Fam, the Silver Wing as Hector, Oscar, Rakesh
- Mayo Chiki! as Jirō Sakamachi
- Nurarihyon no Mago as Do-Hiko

2012

- The Ambition of Oda Nobuna as Shokakuin Gosei
- Accel World as Sand Duct, Sugeno, Yūya Kamioka
- Detective Conan as Sumio Fujinami
- Fairy Tail as Nullpudding, Rocker, Velveno
- Horizon in the Middle of Nowhere Season 2 as Kenji Ito
- Hyōka as Oda, Naoki Goto
- Ixion Saga DT as Limpus
- Sankarea: Undying Love as Edogawa

2013

- Arpeggio of Blue Steel ~Ars Nova~ as Kyōhei Kashihara
- Devil Survivor 2 The Animation as Bifrons
- Fairy Tail as Jiemma
- Log Horizon as Londark, Schreider
- Sasami-san@Ganbaranai as Awajima

2014

- Buddy Complex as Soeharto, Green
- Dragonar Academy as Klaus Witershausen
- Dramatical Murder as Koujaku (young)
- Tokyo ESP as Yoshito Sorimachi

2015

- Assassination Classroom as Sōsuke Sugaya
- Log Horizon 2 as Londark
- Ninja Slayer From Animation as Daedalus
- The Rolling Girls as Marukome
- Yamada-kun and the Seven Witches as Miyashita

2016

- Assassination Classroom 2nd Season as Sōsuke Sugaya
- Kiznaiver as Yoshizawa
- Mobile Suit Gundam Unicorn RE:0096 as Marco
- Poco's Udon World as Matsunaga
- Tanaka-kun is Always Listless as Inokuma
- Tōken Ranbu: Hanamaru as Iwatooshi and Jiroutachi

2017

- Time Bokan 24 as Simplicio

2018

- Happy Sugar Life as Shio and Asahi's father

2019

- Midnight Occult Civil Servants as Maki

2021

- Seven Knights Revolution: Hero Successor as Castor

2022

- To Your Eternity Second Season as Messar Robin Bastar

=== Video games ===
- Toukiden 2 as Homura
- Xenoblade Chronicles as Reyn
- Xenoblade Chronicles X as Custom Male Avatar
- Touken Ranbu as Iwatooshi and Jiroutachi
- The King of Fighters XIV as Bandeiras Hattori
- Dragon Nest as Rubinart
- Kajiri Kamui Kagura as Hajun
- Identity V as Kurt Frank (Explorer)

=== Theatrical animation ===
- Dragon Age: Dawn of the Seeker as Anthony Pentaghast
- Pokémon: Lucario and the Mystery of Mew as Regirock

=== Drama CD ===
- The Comic Artist and Assistants as Kazuma Tsuranuki

=== Dubbing ===
==== Live-action ====
- Adam Hicks
  - Zeke and Luther as Luther Waffles
  - Pair of Kings as King Boz
  - Lemonade Mouth as Wen Gifford
- 17 Again as Stan (Hunter Parrish)
- 31 as Doom-Head (Richard Brake)
- Collide as Matthias (Marwan Kenzari)
- Friday the 13th as Chewie (Aaron Yoo)
- Hannah Montana as Cooper Montgomery (Andre Kinney)
- Hawthorne as Miles Bourdet (Derek Luke)
- Hostel as Alexei
- I, Robot as Farber (Shia LaBeouf)
- Jurassic World Dominion as Rainn Delacourt (Scott Haze)
- The Last Song as Scott
- Primeval as Connor Temple (Andrew-Lee Potts)
- The Social Network as Billy Olson (Bryan Barter)

==== Animation ====
- Hoodwinked Too! Hood vs. Evil as Wolf W. Wolf
- Meet the Robinsons as Frankie
- Mighty Magiswords as Prohyas Warrior
- Ratatouille as Lalo
- Ruby Gloom episode "Skull in the Family" as Skull Roy
- Teenage Mutant Ninja Turtles as Raphael
- TMNT as Raphael
