= Megumi Matsumoto =

Japanese voice actress (born 1977)

- 松元 惠
- Born: February 6, 1977 (age 49); Kumamoto Prefecture, Japan
- Other names: Fujikami Shirou, Moruda Baito, Sayama Shin, Yoshiyuki Sue
- Occupation: Voice actress
- Agent: Ken Production
- Notable work: Crush Gear Turbo as Kouya Marino; Dinosaur King as Ryuta Kodai; The Melancholy of Haruhi Suzumiya as Kunikida; Cardfight!! Vanguard as Saori Fuchidaka

Megumi Matsumoto (松元 惠, Matsumoto Megumi; born February 6, 1977 in Kumamoto) is a Japanese voice actress who works for Ken Production. She is known as the voice of Kouya Marino in Crush Gear Turbo.

== Selected filmography ==
=== Television animation ===
- 009-1 – Tony
- Beyblade G-Revolution – (Ep. 9)
- Cardfight!! Vanguard G: NEXT – Saori Fuchidaka
- Cardfight!! Vanguard G: Z – Saori Fuchidaka
- Crush Gear Turbo – Kouya Marino
- D.I.C.E. – Sam N'Dool
- Death Parade – Jiro (Ep. 5)
- Dinosaur King – Ryuta Kodai (Max Taylor)
- Dramatical Murder – Nao Kuniyashi
- Fantasista Doll – Kaiyo Yamada
- Free! – Haruka Nanase (child)
- Gakuen Alice – Kokoroyomi-kun
- Ga-Rei Zero – Kazuhiro Mitogawa
- Hajime no Ippo: New Challenger – Wataru Takamura
- Higurashi When They Cry – Daiki Tomita
- Hunter × Hunter (2011) – Spinner Clow
- Kuromajo-san ga Toru!! – Shou Sanjou
- Le Chevalier D'Eon – Robin
- Machine Robo Rescue – Ken Minami
- Mirai Nikki – Marco Ikusaba (child)
- Paranoia Agent – (Ep. 12)
- Rideback – Suzuri Uchida
- Rozen Maiden – Kazuki Shibasaki
- Samurai Champloo – Izumi (Ep. 6)
- Shuffle! – Rin Tsuchimi (child)
- Star Ocean EX – Yuki
- The Disappearance of Nagato Yuki-chan – Kunikida
- The Melancholy of Haruhi Suzumiya – Kunikida
- Yakitate!! Japan – Shadow White (child)
- Yattermen! – Chiaki-kun (Ep. 42)

=== Original net animation (ONA) ===
- KY Kei JC Kuuki-chan – Betao Joseki

=== Drama CD ===
- Reverse/End – Senju (child)
- Wild Adapter – Shouta

=== Video games ===
- Crush Gear Turbo (PlayStation) – Kouya Marino
- Everybody's Tennis – JJ
- Kajiri Kamui Kagura – Sojiro Mibu
- Samurai Shodown IV – Rimururu
- Suzumiya Haruhi no Tomadoi – Kunikida
- Suzumiya Haruhi no Tsuisō – Kunikida
- Wonderful Everyday - Mamiya Takuji
- Sakura no Uta - Natsume Kei

=== Dubbing roles ===
- Atonement, Briony Tallis (Saoirse Ronan)
- Oscar's Oasis – Popy
- Phineas and Ferb – Stacy Hirano (2nd voice)
- Shuriken School – Eizan Kaburagi
- Spider-Man Unlimited – Shane Yamada-Jones
