= Dies Irae (TV series) =

Japanese anime television series

- Key visual

ディエス・イレ (Diesu Ire)
- Anime television series
- Directed by: Susumu Kudō
- Produced by: Naokazu Tsuruta; Harutaka Ashitate; Eiji Maesaka; Hiroto Yonemori
- Written by: Takashi Masada
- Music by: Keiji Yonao
- Studio: A.C.G.T
- Licensed by: Crunchyroll
- Original network: Tokyo MX, BS11
- Original run: October 7, 2017 – December 23, 2017
- Episodes: 11 + Special + Recap
- Original net animation

Dies Irae: To the Ring Reincarnation
- Directed by: Susumu Kudō
- Produced by: Naokazu Tsuruta; Harutaka Ashitate; Eiji Maesaka; Hiroto Yonemori
- Written by: Takashi Masada
- Music by: Keiji Yonao
- Studio: A.C.G.T
- Licensed by: Crunchyroll
- Released: July 1, 2018
- Episodes: 6

Dies Irae (Japanese: ディエス・イレ, Hepburn: Diesu Ire) is a Japanese anime television series based on Light's visual novel of the same name, animated by A.C.G.T.

== Synopsis ==
On May 1, 1945, in Germany, a group of Nazi officers carried out a certain ritual during Berlin's collapse since the countless lives lost in the battle served as a catalyst to their sacrificial ceremony. Following the war, they faded into the realm of myth with no one knowing if this group of officers succeeded in reviving the Order of the 13 Lances. 61 years later in Japan, Ren Fujii's friendship with Shirou Yusa shatters to pieces following a certain incident, ending in a vicious fight that sends Ren into the hospital for two months. After leaving the hospital, Ren intended to rebuild his new life without Shirou, but his plan falls apart as irrationality that defies the realm of common sense begins to assault and devour the city. Abnormalities soon seek to destroy everything Ren holds dear before his eyes with overwhelming violence. Even if it means crossing the boundary between the ordinary and the extraordinary, Ren must change though his desires are hardly anything grand. All he wants is to return to the old days filled with simple, everyday joy.

== Characters ==
Ren Fujii (藤井蓮, Fujii Ren)
Voiced by: Kohsuke Toriumi (Japanese); Brandon McInnis (English)
A lone wolf lacking in sociality, who just leaves the hospital after two months due to a fight between him and Shirou. He receives his powers after a transfer from Kasumi, and learns to harness them with training from Kei Sakurai.
Marie / Marguerite Breuil (マリィ / マルグリット・ブルイユ, Marī / Maruguritto Buruiyu)
Voiced by: Yui Sakakibara (Japanese); Jad Saxton (English)
A mysterious blonde haired girl with a large scar around her neck who appears in Ren's dreams after seeing a guillotine at a sword exhibition. She forms a contract with Ren to exhibit his powers.
Kasumi Ayase (綾瀬香純, Ayase Kasumi)
Voiced by: Ayaka Fukuhara (Japanese); Madeleine Morris (English)
An unyielding and masculine girl, who looks after Ren and cares for him.
Rea Himuro (氷室玲愛, Himuro Rea)
Voiced by: Hitomi Nabatame (Japanese); Trina Nishimura (English)
A popular upperclassman with a mixed heritage of German and Japanese blood. She normally tends to keep her distance from those around her.
Shirou Yusa (遊佐司狼, Yusa Shirō)
Voiced by: Takeshi Maeda (Japanese); Austin Tindle (English)
Ren's childhood best friend who is a genius but bored with life. Due to being constant thrill seeker, he has a brutal fight with Ren, breaking their friendship. He then disappears from school and hasn't been heard since.
Erii Honjou (本城恵梨依, Honjō Erii)
Voiced by: Yoshina Makino (Japanese); Elizabeth Maxwell (English)
A young woman whom Shirou meets while he was hospitalized, and the daughter of the director of the hospital Shiro stayed at.
Reinhard Heydrich (ラインハルト・ハイドリヒ, Rainharuto Haidorihi)
Voiced by: Junichi Suwabe (Japanese); Dave Trosko (English)
Leader of the Longinus Dreizehn Orden and a high-ranking official in Germany. He is known as a highly dangerous individual, due to his seemingly boundless talent in all fields. He then forms the Obsidian Round Table alongside Mercurius after faking his death and acted behind the scenes of World War II and kept on destroying friend and foe alike. Reinhard disappears after the fall of Berlin with current whereabouts a mystery.
Valeria Trifa (ヴァレリア・トリファ, Vareria Torifa)
Voiced by: Ken Narita (Japanese); Ian Sinclair (English)
Wilhelm Ehrenburg (ヴィルヘルム・エーレンブルグ, Viruherumu Ērenburugu)
Voiced by: Kishō Taniyama (Japanese); Aaron Roberts (English)
An albino with a long criminal record, Wilhelm served as First Lieutenant for the infamous 36th Waffen Grenadier Division of the SS. His senses magnify in the darkness, almost as if he was a vampire and embraces it as part of his identity. Even Wilhelm's designation and fondness for vampiric characteristics is no coincidence.
Kei Sakurai (櫻井螢, Sakurai Kei)
Voiced by: Kei Mizusawa (Japanese); Brittany Lauda (English)
Descendant of a bloodline that allied with the Obsidian Round Table during World War II. She joined the Table to fill the spot left by Beatrice Kirchisen, who had passed away eleven years prior.
Beatrice Waltrud von Kircheisen (ベアトリス・ヴァルトルート・フォン・キルヒアイゼン, Beatorisu Varutorūto fon Kiruhiaizen)
Voiced by: Kei Mizusawa (Japanese); Alexis Tipton (English)
The former seat of which is now presided by her descendant, Kei Sakurai. She was the lover of Kei's older brother Kai, who is the current Sakurai to inhibit the spirit of Tubal Cain.
Isaak (イザーク, Izāku)
Voiced by: Hitomi Nabatame
One of the twins born from Lisa Brenner, alongside his brother Johann, and the grandfather from Rea Himuro.
Göetz Von Berlichingen / Michael Wittmann (ゲッツ・フォン・ベルリッヒンゲン, Gettsu Fon Berurihhingen)
Voiced by: Hiroki Yasumoto
Rusalka Schwägelin (ルサルカ・シュヴェーゲリン, Rusaruka Shuvēgerin)
Voiced by: Yuka Inokuchi (Japanese); Jeannie Tirado (English)
An early member of the Deutsches Ahnenerbe, Nazi Germany's institute of archaeological and occult research, and a genuine witch who had stepped into the realm of sorcery even before joining the LDO. Her youthful appearance shelters one of the most ancient souls to have sworn loyalty to the Obsidian Round Table. Despite being cunning and crafty at her core, she is playful and flirtatious on the outside, making her a very dangerous individual to associate with. She also has a fondness for torture and is known to be extremely moody. Though essentially not a fighter, her cruelty rivals even Wilhelm's.
Eleonore Von Wittenburg (エレオノーレ・フォン・ヴィッテンブルグ, Ereonōre Fon Vittenburugu)
Voiced by: Asami Yaguchi (Japanese); Alex Moore (English)
Rote Spinne (ロート・シュピーネ, Rōto Shupīne)
Voiced by: Kōki Harasawa (Japanese); Marcus Stimac (English)
A spider-like man who generates razor-sharp strands of webbing that can cut through human bodies with ease. Despite his status as the Tenth member of the obsidian round table, he is one of the weaker minions of Reinhard.
Lisa Brenner (リザ・ブレンナー, Riza Burennā)
Voiced by: Risato Habuki (Japanese); Caitlin Glass (English)
Wolfgang Schreiber (ウォルフガング・シュライバー, Worufugangu Shuraibā)
Voiced by: Yukiko Tamaki (Japanese); Mikaela Krantz (English)
Mercurius / Karl Kraft (メルクリウス / カール・クラフト, Merukuriusu / Kāru Kurafuto)
Voiced by: Kohsuke Toriumi (Japanese); Brandon McInnis (English)
An ominous magician and alchemist who created Ewigkeit and established the Obsidian Round Table. He was the one responsible for turning the LDO from a clique of elite army officers merely dabbling in the occult into a den of genuine demons. Not only is Mercurius the one sworn friend of the Table's leader, he also stands as the only being capable of matching his sublime prowess. Although his position could be considered that of a mentor and a father, the other LDO members – with the exception of their master – shun him as a hateful taboo. His whereabouts have remained a mystery for the past six decades.
Lotus Reichhart (ロートス・ライヒハート, Rōtosu Raihihāto)
Voiced by: Kohsuke Toriumi
Kai Sakurai (櫻井 戒, Sakurai Kai)
Voiced by: Takuma Terashima
Tubal Cain (トバルカイン, Tobarukain)
Voiced by: Hiroki Yasumoto

== Anime ==
The anime was unveiled in December 2015, and aired on television in Japan from October 7 to December 29, 2017. It is produced by the studio Genco, with script supervision by the game's designer, Takashi Masada. The series ran for 12 episodes and the remaining 6 episodes aired on July 1, 2018. The opening theme is "Kadenz" by Yui Sakakibara, while Junichi Suwabe and Kōsuke Toriumi of the voice actor unit Phero Men perform the ending theme. Crunchyroll streamed the series worldwide outside of Asia, (Note: Worldwide, outside of Asia.) and Funimation released a dub for it. On March 14, 2018, it was announced that Dies Irae will return with a second cour and premiered on July 1. Crunchyroll streamed the last 6 episodes.

No.	Title	Original air date
0	"The Dawning Days"; Transliteration: "Reimei" (Japanese: 黎明)	October 7, 2017
At the start of a great war, an important leader in the German security bureau takes on a mission to fight supernatural mutants himself.
1	"Twilight Girl"; Transliteration: "Tasogare no Shōjo" (Japanese: 黄昏の少女)	October 14, 2017
2	"The Claws and Fangs of a Beast"; Transliteration: "Kemono no Sōga" (Japanese: 獣の爪牙)	October 21, 2017
3	"The End of the Nightmare Is a Beginning"; Transliteration: "Akumu no Owari wa hajimari" (Japanese: 悪夢の終わりは始まり)	October 28, 2017
4	"Spider"; Transliteration: "Kumo" (Japanese: 蜘蛛)	November 4, 2017
Sakurai tells Ren the history of the Obsidian Round Table and begins training him to use his powers. When Kasumi tries to find out why Ren and Sakurai are spending so much time together, Ren lies and tells her that he and Sakurai are dating (which quickly earns his manhood a taste of Sakurai's iron grip). Rote Spinne uses Kasumi in order to lure out Ren – who must embrace his powers in order to rescue his victims and defeat him.
5	"Reunion"; Transliteration: "Saikai" (Japanese: 再会)	November 11, 2017
Ren wakes up with the mysterious girl from his visions next to him. With the Obsidian Round Table putting his friends' lives in danger, Ren confronts Shirou to see what he knows. Their reunion is interrupted by an attack from Wilhelm.
6	"Golden Beast"; Transliteration: "Kogane no kemono" (Japanese: 黄金の獣)	November 18, 2017
Wilhelm is stunned by Shirou's ability to dodge his attacks and decides to take things seriously. Ren gets the upper hand against Sakurai, only for Reinhard to reveal himself and his overwhelming power.
7	"Swastika"; Transliteration: "Suwasuchika" (Japanese: スワスチカ)	November 25, 2017
Reinhard explains to Ren that he requires a powerful foe who can break him from his constant deja vu. Ren agrees to be Reinhard's opponent and fight his minions on the condition that Marie is returned to him.
8	"Promise"; Transliteration: "Yakusoku" (Japanese: 約束)	December 1, 2017
The Obsidian Round Table commence their slaughter of Suwahara City, beginning with an attack on the nightclub where Shirou, Honjou and a kidnapped Kasumi are hiding.
9	"A Mother's Sins"; Transliteration: "Haha no Ai" (Japanese: 母の罪(アイ))	December 8, 2017
Ren must fight Sakurai to prevent Lisa from destroying the hospital where Kasumi is resting. Their fight is interrupted by an even more powerful minion of Heydrich.
10	"Einherjar"; Transliteration: "Einferia" (Japanese: 不死英雄(エインフェリア))	December 15, 2017
11	"Self-Destruction Factor"; Transliteration: "Jimetsu inshi" (Japanese: 自滅因子)	December 22, 2017
SP	Transliteration: "Dies irae Marie's Memory "michi ni tsūzu kiseki"" (Japanese: Dies irae Marie's Memory『未知に通ず軌跡』)	December 29, 2017
12	"Emanation Level"; Transliteration: "Ryūshutsu ikai" (Japanese: 流出位階)	July 1, 2018
Kraft reveals his plans for a successor.
13	"Gladsheim"; Transliteration: "Shura dō shikō ten" (Japanese: 修羅道至高天)	July 1, 2018
The truth of the Grail is revealed.
14	"Golden Alchemy"; Transliteration: "Ōgon rensei" (Japanese: 黄金錬成)	July 1, 2018
With the Grail destroyed, Heydrich is resurrected. Ren, Maria, Shirou and Sakurai resolve to fight Heydrich to the bitter end.
15	"Valhalla Emanation"; Transliteration: "Varuhara ryūshutsu" (Japanese: ヴァルハラ流出)	July 1, 2018
Realizing that neither he nor Ren are at their full power just yet, Heydrich has Machina fight Ren instead.
16	"Verweile Doch"; Transliteration: "Toki yo tomare" (Japanese: 時よ止まれ)	July 1, 2018
Ren discovers his full power during his fight with Machina. Ren's allies play their part, but at a heavy cost.
17	"To the New World"; Transliteration: "Shin sekai e" (Japanese: 新世界へ)	July 1, 2018
The final battle between Ren and Heydrich reaches its conclusion, after which Kraft decides on his successor.

== Production ==
The Dies Irae anime project was financed through a crowdfunding campaign ending in July 2015, through which ¥96,560,858 was raised, over three times the target figure of ¥30,000,000.
