= Ankle breaker =

Holes drilled into bridges to facilitate crossing

Ankle breakers are small but deep holes drilled into drawbridges, stone bridges, and other defensive fortifications, in order to allow a slow moving party to cross easily, while causing a running person to twist their ankle and fall, which could result in injury. Its purpose was to slow down or harm those attempting to enter the fortress.

== In sports ==
In sports, ankle breakers are a combination of legal moves within the confines of a sport's rules that send a player on the ground, hence the name 'ankle breaker'. The ankle breaker occurs most notably in football or basketball, with a crossover or other ball handling move, or in hockey.

== In games ==
In games, ankle breakers are when someone tricks something, usually another player into moving the wrong way to win or to help something or someone.
