= Eternal Eden =

2008 video game

- Eternal Eden Main Title
- Developer: Blossomsoft
- Publisher: Blossomsoft
- Series: Eternal Eden
- Engine: RPG Maker VX
- Platform: Microsoft Windows
- Release: December 11, 2008
- Genre: Role-playing game
- Mode: Single player

Eternal Eden is a 2D Japanese-style RPG created for the PC by Blossomsoft. The game was created using RPG Maker VX.

== Gameplay ==
The game is presented in a top-down tile-based view, and enemies are only present in dungeons and appear as puffs of smoke on the field. Touching a puff of smoke starts a battle. Enemies do not respawn once they've been killed. An exclamation point will emerge above the player's head whenever he finds a hidden item. Every dungeon has a Treasure Room in which treasures and bonus experience points can be earned provided a condition is met, such as "kill all the monsters on this floor".

== Plot ==
The player controls a child, Noah, who lives in a utopia called Eden. In Eden, all needs are provided for by Eden Tower and everyone lives eternally at their prime age. Noah wakes from a dream – the tutorial of the game – in time for the Princess's 900th birthday. Noah's friend Downey wants to present her with the best pie. He convinces Noah to take the forbidden Wisdom Fruit as an ingredient. The Princess eats the pie, turns into a monster, and escapes through a mysterious gate. Storms begin to rage, Eden Tower's door shuts and the land's magic is negated: people begin to fall ill and grow old. Noah, Downey and Downey's rival Jean pursue the Princess.

Across a gateway, they return to a ruined version of the town, with Eden Tower still shut. A mysterious priest named Dogan appears, and then confronts Noah, explaining that they've traveled 1000 years in the future, and that the princess has transformed into a monster. Dogan heads to the site of Rishi, who he claims to be helpful to them. They find an airship, and then a monster appears. After defeating the monster, they hear voices of the Princess, before being sent through time.

The three end up back at the present day, but right around at the same time when the past selves come in. Trying to get a workaround, they try to change the fruits of wisdom in attempt to save the princess and stop events, but it backfires and a thunderstorm begins which hits Dogan's home, setting it on fire. Dogan is revealed to be eating the fruits of wisdom, and then attacks Noah back. Noah wakes up again in someone else's house, and regroup with Downey and Jean, somewhere between time, and with Dogan missing. They then find out that new people have taken their spots, and then they find out that the ship has landed in the shore, still functional.

== Reception ==
RPGFan rates Eternal Eden at 90/100 a few months later critic Neal Chandran awarded the game #1 of his Editor's Pick choices of 2008. Gamertell praised the storyline of Eternal Eden, with its "message of redemption" and use of "religious archetypes". Game Tunnel highlighted the game's music and artwork, with "vivid and crisp" environments, and "massive, intimidating and detailed" boss battles. The gameplay of Eternal Eden, while typical of the genre, has drawn comparisons with classic JRPGs such as early Final Fantasy titles. However, reviews have criticized the English localization: the dialogue includes occasional grammatical errors and awkward delivery, with the game's JayIsGames review noting that the dialogue was "awkward" in places.

== Sequel ==
Eternal Eden: Ecclesia was to be the direct sequel of Eternal Eden. The standalone sequel was cancelled and is planned to be included into the reboot of the original game.
