= Koi suru Tenshi Angelique =

2006 Japanese anime series

恋する天使アンジェリーク
- Anime television series

Koi suru Tenshi Angelique ~ Kokoro no Mezameru Toki ~
- Directed by: Susumu Kudo
- Produced by: Oshi Yoshinuma; Yūka Sakurai; Michiaki Satō; Kaoru Murakami; Mami Matsushita
- Written by: Michiru Shimada
- Music by: Hikaru Nanase
- Studio: Satelight
- Original network: Asahi Broadcasting, Chiba TV, Kids Station, Tokyo MX TV, TV Aichi, TV Hokkaido, TV Kanagawa, TV Saitama
- Original run: July 8, 2006 – September 30, 2006
- Episodes: 13
- Anime television series

Koi suru Tenshi Angelique ~ Kagayaki no Ashita ~
- Directed by: Susumu Kudo
- Produced by: Oshi Yoshinuma; Yūka Sakurai; Kaoru Murakami; Mami Matsushita; Tsutomu Kasai
- Written by: Michiru Shimada
- Music by: Hikaru Nanase
- Studio: Satelight
- Original network: Kids Station
- Original run: January 5, 2007 – March 23, 2007
- Episodes: 12

Koi suru Tenshi Angelique (恋する天使アンジェリーク; lit. 'Beloved Angel Angelique') is a spinoff anime series of the Angelique series. Koi suru Tenshi Angelique: Kokoro no Mezameru Toki (恋する天使アンジェリーク 〜心のめざめる時〜; lit. Beloved Angel Angelique: When Hearts Awaken) and its sequel Koi suru Tenshi Angelique: Kagayaki no Ashita (恋する天使アンジェリーク 〜かがやきの明日〜; lit. Beloved Angel Angelique: Radiant Tomorrow) were directed by Susumu Kudo and animated by Satelight.

== Plot ==
There are two universes in the Cosmos. One is old and pretty mature universe, the Shinchō (Divine Bird Universe). The other is the new, and inmature world, the Seijū (Sacred Beast Universe), in which there is a new queen, Angelique Collet. The crisis takes place in the Seijū. The queen Collet asks the help to the queen of the Shinchō, Angelique Limoges. The story begins.

First Part - When the Heart Awaken

Queen Limoges opens the conference with 9 guardians of the Shinchō how to save the Seijū. The "monolith of Gabel" discloses the prediction that the Legendary Etoile may help the new universe.

There is a girl in the local, country planet. She is Ange who is insecure and does not realise the power she possesses until she is invited to a holy land of the Shinchō. Queen Limoges and her nine guardians think she might be a legendary etoile. So Ange starts to save the universe of Seijū and its queen Collet by the power of nine sacrea. This is the mission of Ange, that is, saving the new universe.

Ange finds the crisis of the Seijū is brought by "the Spirit of Sacrea". The spirit declares that they will inactivate Ange because she will save the human beings of the Seijū which are the evil thing. And the spirit kidnappes sleeping queen of the Seijū, Collet. Ange is left in the holy land of the Seijū universe alone.

Second Part - Radiant Tomorrow

There are no guardians in the Seijū universe because it is still young world. Ange tries to find candidates of guardians with Rachel Hart, the Aide of queen Collet. They finds one, the guardian of the wind, and the second... If they can find all 9 guardians in the Seijū，they may defeat the spirit of the Sacrea, and save the Seijū...

== Characters ==
Name	Role (former)	Origin	Universe	Age	Voiced by
Ange (Enju) エンジュ	Legendary Etoile (Girl of local, country planet)	Shinchō	Both universes	17	Yōko Honna
Constantan タンタン	Spirit of Monolith (Stone Tablet of Gabel)	Shinchō	Both universes	?	-
Name	Role (former)	Origin	Universe	Age	Voiced by
Angelique Limoges (アンジェリーク・リモージュ)	256th Queen of the Shinchō universe (Student of Smallney girls Academy)	Shinchō	Shinchō	17	Yuri Shiratori
Rosalia de Catargena (ロザリア・デ・カタルヘナ)	Aide of the queen Limoges (Daughter of high-ranking Noble)	Shinchō	Shinchō	17	Kotono Mitsuishi
Julious (ジュリアス)	Guardian of the light, (Shinchō)	Shinchō	Shinchō	25	Shō Hayami
Clavis (クラヴィス)	Guardian of the darkness, (Shinchō)	Shinchō	Shinchō	25	Kaneto Shiozawa
Luva (ルヴァ)	Guardian of the earth, (Shinchō)	Shinchō	Shinchō	26	Toshihiko Seki
Oscar (オスカー)	Guardian of the fire, (Shinchō)	Shinchō	Shinchō	22	Kenyū Horichi
Lumiale (リュミエール)	Guardian of the water, (Shinchō)	Shinchō	Shinchō	21	Nobuo Tobita
Olivie (オリヴィエ)	Guardian of the dream, (Shinchō)	Shinchō	Shinchō	22	Takehito Koyasu
Randy (ランディ)	Guardian of the wind, (Shinchō)	Shinchō	Shinchō	18	Nobutoshi Canna
Zephel (ゼフェル)	Guardian of the steel, (Shinchō)	Shinchō	Shinchō	17	Mitsuo Iwata
Marcel (マルセル)	Guardian of the green, (Shinchō)	Shinchō	Shinchō	14	Hiro Yūki
Name	Role (former)	Origin	Universe	Age	Voiced by
Angelique Collet (アンジェリーク・コレット)	1st Queen of the Seijū universe	Shinchō	Seijū	17	Yōko Asada
Rachel Hart (レイチェル・ハート)	Aide of the queen Collet	Shinchō	Seijū	16	Miki Nagasawa
Leonard (レオナード)	Guardian of the light, (Seijū) (Bartender of planet Branagan, Seijū)	Seijū	Seijū	27	Rikiya Koyama
Francis (フランシス)	Guardian of the darkness, (Seijū) (Psychotherapist of planet Kirievire, Seijū)	Seijū	Seijū	23	Tomokazu Sugita
Victor (ヴィクトール)	Guardian of the earth, (Seijū) (General of Royal expeditionary force, Tutor)	Shinchō	Seijū	34	Fumihiko Tachiki
Charlie Won (チャーリー)	Guardian of the fire, (Seijū) (Head of large conglomerate, Collaborator)	Shinchō	Seijū	26	Mitsuaki Madono
Timka (ティムカ)	Guardian of the wate,r (Seijū) (Young King of Hakua palace planet, Tutor)	Shinchō	Seijū	16	Atsushi Kisaichi
Mel (メル)	Guardian of the dream, (Seijū) (Fortune teller of Fire-dragon clan, Collaborator)	Shinchō	Seijū	18	Yumi Tōma
Heuye (ユーイ)	Guardian of the wind, (Seijū) (Boy of planet Jiire, Seijū)	Seijū	Seijū	17	Daisuke Namikawa
Ernst (エルンスト)	Guardian of the steel, (Seijū) (Chief of Royal Research Institute, Collaborator)	Shinchō	Seijū	30	Toshiyuki Morikawa
Sei-lan (セイラン)	Guardian of the green, (Seijū) (Famous Artist (painter), Tutor)	Shinchō	Seijū	22	Tetsuya Iwanaga
Arios (アリオス)	Shadow of the queen Collet (Mysterious Man)	Shinchō	Seijū	28	Ken Narita
Sacrea no Seirei サクリアの精霊	Spirit of the Sacrea	Seijū	Seijū	?	Akimitsu Takase / Eri Ōno
Moira モイラ	Cosmic Mind of Ange	Shinchō	Both universes	?	Yōko Honna

== Media ==
=== Anime ===
==== Koi suru Tenshi Angelique: Kokoro no Mezameru Toki ====
Koi suru Tenshi Angelique: Kokoro no Mezameru Toki was released by Satelight between July 8, 2006, and September 30, 2006. It uses two pieces of theme music. The opening theme is "Infinite Love" by Granrodeo and the ending theme is "Dearest You" by 2Hearts.

The main character Ange along with the Nine Guardians of the Shinchou Universe Top L-R: Clavis, Julious, Luva, Oscar, Lumiale Mid Row L-R: Randy, Ange Bottom Row L-R: Zephel, Marcel, Olivie

No.	Title	Original release date
1	"The Legendary Etoile"; Transliteration: "Densetsu no Etowaru" (Japanese: 伝説のエトワール)	July 8, 2006
The story opens with the Queen of the Shinchou universe conversing with the Queen of the Seijuu universe, and the Seijuu Queen mentioning her stars breaking. Concerned, she has her assistant, Rosalia, call her nine Guardians together. After the Queen explains the situation, Luva, the Guardian of Earth, takes the other Guardians, the Queen, and Rosalia to a sacred stone of prophecy, where he reveals that there is a prophecy about one who will come to the Holy Land and shine like an angel. Soon after, a ship carrying a group of young girls arrives to the Holy Land, one of them destined be the Legendary Etoile. Ernst briefs the Guardians as the girls arrive, one among them dressed like a boy with glasses. The other girls snub her as interviews begin. Zephel, the Guardian of Steel, hides in the forest to avoid participating and encounters the odd girl in question, saving her from falling and revealing her to be extremely beautiful. The girl pushes him away and runs away with her bags as the Guardians are discussing that they have not found the girl with that special shine. It is revealed the girl, named Ange, declined her interview, believing herself not to be suitable to be the Legendary Etoile. She ends up at the stone that Luva showed the Guardians, and her memories are shown. As the Guardians arrive, it is revealed Ange is the Legendary Etoile.
2	"First Time In The Sacred Land"; Transliteration: "Hajimete no Seichi De" (Japanese: 初めての聖地で)	July 15, 2006
Ange wakes up in a bedroom after the previous day's events. After Rosalia comes and tells her she is to meet the Queen, Ange dresses in her old clothes and meets some of the other Guardians, including Randy, Marcel, and Lumiale. Olivie, the Guardian of Dreams, then comes and whisks her away and gives her a makeover. Ange runs away as the Guardians observe her, only to run into the Guardian of Fire, Oscar, and is whisked away by him to a nearby village festival. Oscar scolds her for not dancing, and Ange responds by performing a folk dance. Later, Oscar chides her for not wanting to be the Etoile, and encourages her to find her own eternal galaxy. Ange prepares to run away, but shows up in the throne room instead and asks what her mission is as the Queen arrives.
3	"The Holy Sacrea"; Transliteration: "Seinaru Sakuria" (Japanese: 聖なるサクリア)	July 22, 2006
The Queen arrives and tells Ange of the Sacrea and the Guardians, and which Sacrea they represent (Julious, light and pride; Clavis, darkness and tranquility; Randy, wind and courage; Lumiale, water and kindness; Oscar, fire and strength; Marcel, greenery and abundance; Zephel, steel and ingenuity; Olivie, beauty and dreams; and Luva, knowledge and earth). The Queen then reveals to Ange the fate of the Seijuu galaxy, and states that her mission is to awaken the Queen of the Seijuu universe from her slumber. Ange initially is unsure, but decides to help. Julious bestows on her the Sacrea of Light, which causes Ange to faint. She rests, then Luva comes, and takes Ange and tells her the story of how he became a Guardian, and also of the Queen and Rosalia. Ange then reacts to the Sacrea of Light, and Julious and Luva take her to the Seijuu galaxy, where Ange releases the Sacrea over the land, allowing things to thaw a little.
4	"A Small Bud"; Transliteration: "Chiisana Me" (Japanese: ちいさな芽)	July 29, 2006
Ange goes around to collect Sacrea from the Guardians. Upon approaching Olivie, he expresses concern for her, but Ange insists she is fine. After gathering Sacrea from Marcel, Ange and Zephel encounter each other and exchange few words before Ange goes to the Seijuu universe. Once there she releases the Sacrea, but a projection of the future shows a problem with the balance of Sacrea. Ange is horrified and wishes to remedy the situation by herself, but Zephel scolds her for not asking for help. Ernst reveals that the Sacreas need to balance out, and Marcel and Randy give her Sacrea. The three of them, along with Zephel, journey to the Seijuu universe, where the Sacrea is released into the land.
5	"Recollections of Darkness"; Transliteration: "Yami no Tsuioku" (Japanese: 闇の追憶)	August 5, 2006
6	"A Day Off in the Sacred Land"; Transliteration: "Seichi no Kyujitsu" (Japanese: 聖地の休日)	August 12, 2006
7	"The Spring of Life"; Transliteration: "Inochi no Izumi" (Japanese: 命の泉)	August 19, 2006
8	"A Growing Miracle"; Transliteration: "Ōi Naru Kiseki" (Japanese: 大いなる奇跡)	August 26, 2006
9	"The Door of Ice"; Transliteration: "Kōri no Tobira" (Japanese: 氷の扉)	September 2, 2006
10	"Swaying Emotion"; Transliteration: "Yureru Omoi" (Japanese: 揺れる想い)	September 9, 2006
11	"Two Loves"; Transliteration: "Futatsu no Ai" (Japanese: ふたつの愛)	September 16, 2006
12	"Wandering"; Transliteration: "Sasurai no Naka de" (Japanese: さすらいのなかで)	September 23, 2006
13	"The Time of the Showdown"; Transliteration: "Taiketsu no Toki" (Japanese: 対決の時)	September 30, 2006

==== Koi suru Tenshi Angelique: Kagayaki no Ashita ====
Koi suru Tenshi Angelique: Kagayaki no Ashita was broadcast by Kids Station between January 5, 2007, and March 23, 2007. It uses two pieces of theme music. The opening theme is "Doukoku no Ame" (慟哭ノ雨) by Granrodeo and the ending theme is "Yakusoku no Chi e" (やすそくのちえ) by 2Hearts.

Ange and the Nine Guardians of the Seijuu universe Top: Arios, Charlie 2nd Row: Victor, Ernst 3rd Row: Leonard, Ange, Francis 4th Row: Sei-lan, Timka 5th Row: Mel, Hueye

No.	Title	Original release date
1	"A New Mission"; Transliteration: "Arata na Shimei" (Japanese: 新たな使命)	January 5, 2007
After the events of the previous season's conclusion, Ange finds herself stranded in the Seijuu universe with no way back to her home in the Shinchou Universe. After a month, a despondent Ange is able to speak with the Guardians of the Shincou universe's spirits, and decides her new mission is to find nine Guardians for the Seijuu universe in order to release the Queen of that universe, who is being held imprisoned by the Spirit of Sacrea in the Land of Shadows, as Mel reveals this to the Guardians of the Shinchou universe. With the aid of Rachel, the Queen's aide, and the palace staff, she locates the first Guardian on planet Jiire. When Rachel suggests that they bring the Guardian to the palace against his will, Ange intervenes, remembering Clavis' story of being torn from his mother, and travels there to convince him to come and become a guardian.
2	"The Boy of Wind"; Transliteration: "Kaze no Shōnen" (Japanese: 風の少年)	January 12, 2007
Ange finds the Guardian of Wind in a small seaside town, a young man named Heueye who lives in the town with his grandfather Vitto. Ange attempts to convince Heuye to return with her as a guardian but he refuses, especially when Ange reveals he cannot return to Jiire. When a storm strikes the town, Vitto is caught at sea, and Heueye attempts to rescue him, only to have Vitto cut the rope. Ange then uses her powers to unlock the Sacrea of Wind and Heueye uses the power to calm the wind down, saving Vitto. He finally accepts his place in the universe as the Guardian of Wind, and pledges himself to the Queen.
3	"The Lightless Star"; Transliteration: "The Lightless Star" (Japanese: 光なき星)	January 19, 2007
As Heueye attempts to adjust to his role as a Guardian, the palace staff locate the candidate for the Guardian of Light on planet Branagan, much to Rachel's surprise, due to the fact that the planet is considered a criminal underworld. Ange arrives and meets a young street urchin named Matt, who takes her to a bar and discovers the bar owner, Leonard, is the Guardian of Light. However, she soon discovers he is greedy and will only come with her for a fee. After being accosted by thugs and discovering he is smuggling, she runs off frustrated, saying he is the worst, but Matt takes her to a small orphanage, where it is revealed that Leonard is smuggling and earning money for the small orphanage where he grew up. Despite his best efforts, it closes, but the kids thank him for showing him strength. After thinking it over, he decides leave with Ange to become the Guardian of Light.
4	"The Street Under the Hazy Moon"; Transliteration: "Rougetsu no Machi" (Japanese: 朧月の街)	January 26, 2007
Heueye and Leonard are lazing around the palace much to Rachel's chagrin as Ange is sent on her next mission to planet Kirieveru to retrieve the Guardian of Darkness. Ange finds Francis, an escort and playboy, at an old mansion, where he believes her story very readily much to her surprise. However, his playboy exterior makes Ange believe he is not taking her seriously. At a ball, it is revealed he cares about his city and wants to make changes to better improve the smog conditions. Ange attempts to convince the mayor, but comes up short, and Francis makes things worse by acting like his playboy self again. She returns to his mansion and confronts Francis. Francis ends up falling off a balcony due to the decaying rain, and Ange grabs him but both are pulled over the edge. The Sacrea of Darkness activates and saves them, and Francis agrees to come with Ange, as long as she promises to stay by his side as much as possible.
5	"Reunion"; Transliteration: "Saikai" (Japanese: 再会)	February 2, 2007
Francis is initiated into the Guardians, while Leonard accosts Ange on her promise that bars and casinos will be built, and Heueye attempts to take her to see some flowers out back. The Guardians in Ange's old universe are missing her, and the Queens of each universe converse, and are able to restore the Dimensional pathway so Ange can return. Ange come with the three Guardians from the other universe, and joyously reunites with her old friends. Meanwhile, a worker in the palace staff, Ernst, observes a rise in the Sacrea of Steel as Ange and her old and new friends enjoy a banquet, and Julious expresses his concern at Leonard being a Guardian of light and leader of the Guardians of the Seijuu universe. At a meeting with the Queen, it is revealed the remaining six Guardians of the Seijuu universe are located in the Shinchou Universe. Their identities, Victor, Sei-lan, Timka, Ernst, Mel, and Charlie, are soon revealed, and Ernst reveals himself to be the Seijuu universe's Guardian of Steel and accepts his position.
6	"The Bond Protecting the Cosmos"; Transliteration: "Uchuu wo Mamoru Kizuna" (Japanese: 宇宙を護る絆)	February 9, 2007
7	"Fate is Revolving"; Transliteration: "Unmei wa Meguru" (Japanese: 運命はめぐる)	February 16, 2007
Ange prepares to go find the flame sacrea guardian, however in the garden she sees Arios and has a flashback to when her heart was broken by him. Then she goes to the Won Financial group building to look for the guardian of the flame sacrea named charlie the Spirit of Sacrea is planning something but what?
8	"Love and the Mission"; Transliteration: "Koi to Shimei to" (Japanese: 恋と使命と)	February 23, 2007
9	"The Young King"; Transliteration: "Wakaki Ou" (Japanese: 若き王)	March 2, 2007
10	"The Ninth Guardian"; Transliteration: "Kuninme No Shigosei" (Japanese: 九人目の守護聖)	March 9, 2007
11	"The Final Test"; Transliteration: "Saigo no Shiren" (Japanese: 最後の試練)	March 16, 2007
12	"Toward a Shining Tomorrow"; Transliteration: "Kagayakeru Ashita e" (Japanese: 輝ける明日へ)	March 23, 2007

=== Character CDs ===
King Records released 19 character CDs for Koi suru Tenshi Angelique. The songs are sung by the characters' voice actor/actress. The first and second character CDs for Zephyr and Randy, respectively were released on June 5, 2007. The third, fourth and fifth character CDs for Marcel, Luva and Clavis, respectively, were released on August 9, 2006. The sixth, seventh and eighth character CDs were released on October 4, 2006. The ninth, tenth and eleventh character CDs for Oliver, Arios and Yui, respectively, were released on October 25, 2006. The twelfth, thirteenth and fourteenth character CDs were released on December 21, 2006. The fifteenth and sixteenth character CDs were released on January 11, 2007. The seventeenth, eighteenth and nineteenth character CDs were released on March 21, 2007.

On February 27, 2008, King Records released an album for Koi suru Tenshi Angelique containing all 19 character songs.

=== Soundtrack CDs ===
On July 26, 2006, King Records released a soundtrack CD for the Koi Suru Tenshi Angelique: Kokoro no Mezameru Toki opening theme, "Infinite Love" by Granrodeo. On August 23, 2006, King Records released a soundtrack CD for the Koi Suru Tenshi Angelique: Kokoro no Mezameru Toki ending theme, "Dearest You" by 2Hearts. On February 14, 2007, King Records released a soundtrack CD for the Koi Suru Tenshi Angelique: Kagayaki no Ashita opening theme, "Yakusoku No Chi He" by 2Hearts.

=== Radio CDs ===
On August 23, 2006, King Records released a radio CD for Koi suru Tenshi Angelique called, Koi Suru Tenshi Angelique Sweet Paradise memory 01. The songs were sung by Kenyu Horiuchi and Daisuke Namikawa. The second radio CD, Koi Suru Tenshi Angelique Sweet Paradise memory 02, was released on December 6, 2006. The songs were sung by Kenyu Horiuchi, Daisuke Namikawa, Show Hayami, Mitsuo Iwata, Nobutoshi Kanna, Nobio Tobita and Toshihiko Seki. The third radio CD, Koi Suru Tenshi Angelique Sweet Paradise memory 03, was released on May 9, 2005.

=== Drama CDs ===
On February 21, 2007, King Records released a Drama CD for Koi Suru Tenshi Angelique, called Seichi no Hitotoki Shincho Hen. The songs were sung by Kenyu Horiuchi, Daisuke Namikawa, Show Hayami, Mitsuo Iwata, Nobio Tobita, Hideyuki Tanaka, Hiro Yuuki, Takehito Koyasu, Kyoko Hikami, and Toshihiko Seki.

On April 9, 2008, King Records released another Drama CD for Koi Suru Tenshi Angelique. The songs are sung by Mitsuo Iwata, Nobutoshi Kanna, Toshihiko Seki, Hideyuki Tanaka, Kenyu Horiuchi, Nobio Tobita, Show Hayami, Takehito Koyasu, Kyoko Hikami, Ken Narita, Fumihiko Tachiki, Mitsuaki Madono, Tetsuya Iwananaga, and Yumi Toma.
