= Kajiri Kamui Kagura =

2011 visual novel video game

- Developer: Light
- Publisher: Wen Yang
- Designer: G-Yuusuke
- Writer: Takashi Masada
- Composer: Keishi Yonao
- Platforms: Windows; PlayStation Vita
- Release: September 2011
- Genre: Visual novel
- Mode: Single-player

Kajiri Kamui Kagura (かじりかむいかぐら or 神咒神威神楽) commonly abbreviated to K3 or KKK, is a Japanese eroge visual novel video game. It was originally released for Windows in September 2011, and was later remade for the PlayStation Vita. The Vita version, titled Kajiri Kamui Kagura: Akebono no Hikari (神咒神威神楽 曙之光), was released on 25 April 2013, it removed all H-scenes from the original release, and added additional CGs.

Kajiri Kamui Kagura is part of the "Shinza Bansho" series (神座万象シリーズ) of visual novels by the company Light. The other two titles in the series are Dies irae and Paradise Lost.

== Characters ==
=== Main characters ===
Habaki Sakagami (坂上 覇吐, Sakagami Habaki)
Voiced by: Shinobu Horikawa (Windows), Eiji Miyashita (PlayStation Vita)

Rindo Koga (久雅 竜胆, Koga Rindō)
Voiced by: Buke Hanataba (Windows), Saki Nakajima (PlayStation Vita)

Keishiro Kyogetsu (凶月 刑士郎, Kyōgetsu Keishirō)
Voiced by: Kazuya Sugisaki (Windows), Kisho Taniyama (PlayStation Vita)

Sakuya Kyogetsu (凶月 咲耶, Kyōgetsu Sakuya)
Voiced by: Miyabi Arisugawa (Windows), Hatsumi Takada (PlayStation Vita)

Sojiro Mibu (壬生 宗次郎, Mibu Sōjirō)
Voiced by: Shi Sayama (Windows), Megumi Matsumoto (PlayStation Vita)

Shiori Kujo (玖錠 紫織, Kujō Shiori)
Voiced by: Kaname Yuzuki (Windows), Shiho Kawaragi (PlayStation Vita)

Yako Madara (摩多羅 夜行, Madara Yakō)
Voiced by: Kaze Haruno (Windows), Wataru Hatano (PlayStation Vita)

Ryusui Mikado (御門 龍水, Mikado Ryūsui)
Voiced by: Mizuki (Windows), Keiko Kobayashi (PlayStation Vita)
