= Granrodeo =

Japanese rock band

- Also known as: Gran Rodeo; KiSHOW+e-ZUKA
- Origin: Tokyo, Japan
- Genres: Hard rock; heavy metal; J-pop; anison; VGM
- Years active: 2005–present
- Labels: Lantis (2005–2009, 2012–2024); GloryHeaven (2009–2012); GLEAN (2024-present)
- Members: Ki-Show; E-Zuka
- Website: www.granrodeo.net

Granrodeo (stylized in all caps) is a Japanese rock band specializing in anime soundtracks. Its members consist of voice-actor and singer Kishō Taniyama (Ki-Show) and songwriter Masaaki Īzuka (E-Zuka).

== Career ==
In 2005 voice actor Kishō Taniyama ("Ki-Show") and musician Masaaki Īzuka ("E-Zuka"), known for his collaborations in creating anime soundtracks, decided to create a new project. During their years as a band, they released a few singles that were used as opening singles for the anime series.

In 2007 they released their first album, Ride on the Edge, and in 2008 they release a second album, Instinct. In spring 2009 they started working on the soundtrack, the series Needless, for which E-Zuka wrote the soundtracks and Ki-Show wrote the lyrics for the song "Modern Strange Cowboy". By the end of 2009, they released their third album, Brush the Scar Lemon. In 2011 they released their fourth album, Supernova, and in 2012 they released their fifth album Crack Star Flash.

Granrodeo covered "Tell Me" for the 6 June 2018 hide tribute album Tribute Impulse.

They provided a cover of "Tenshi wa Dare da" for the 29 January 2020 Buck-Tick tribute album Parade III ~Respective Tracks of Buck-Tick~

== Members ==
- Ki-Show (Kishō Taniyama) – vocals, lyrics. According to him, the role of a vocalist is more suitable for him than the role of a voice actor.
- E-Zuka (Masaaki Īzuka) – Guitar, composer, arranging. His style of playing the guitar combines melodic solo parts and aggressive guitar riffs. He also collaborates with Minami Kuribayashi.

=== Session musicians ===
- Ikuo – bass guitar (bassist of the band Bull Zeichen 88). Previously played in the progressive rock band Lapis Lazuli, known for its soundtrack albums for the game Guilty Gear. He also plays the bass for the band Abingdon Boys School & Minami Kuribayashi.

== Discography ==
=== Albums ===
==== Studio albums ====
| Year | Album details | Catalog No. | Peak Oricon chart position |
|---|---|---|---|
| 2007 | Ride on the Edge: Released: 25 July 2007; Label: Lantis; Format: CD | LACA-5670 | 26 |
| 2008 | Instinct: Released: 26 September 2008; Label: Lantis; Format: CD | LACA-5810 | 18 |
| 2009 | Brush the Scar Lemon: Released: 28 October 2009; Label: Lantis; Format: CD | LASA-35024 (Limited Edition), LASA-5024 (Regular Edition) | 14 |
| 2011 | Supernova: Released: 6 April 2011; Label: Lantis; Format: CD | LASA-35094/5 (Limited Edition), LASA-5094 (Regular Edition) | 13 |
| 2012 | Crack Star Flash: Released: 10 October 2012; Label: Lantis; Format: CD | LACA-35240 (Limited Edition), LACA-15240 (Regular Edition) | 3 |
| 2014 | Karma to Labyrinth (カルマとラビリンス): Released: 24 September 2014; Label: Lantis; Format: CD | LACA-35430 (Limited Edition), LACA-15430 (Regular Edition) | 3 |
| 2017 | Pierrot Dancin': Released: 8 February 2017; Label: Lantis; Format: CD | LACA-35640 (Limited Edition), LACA-15640 (Regular Edition) | 3 |
| 2019 | Fab Love: Released: 15 May 2019; Label: Lantis; Format: CD | LACA-35778 (Limited Edition), LACA-15778 (Regular Edition) | 8 |
| 2022 | Question: Released: 23 March 2022; Label: Lantis; Format: CD | | |
| 2024 | GR STORY: Released: 25 September 2024; Label: GLEAN; Format: CD | | |
| 2026 | ChaosBlue: Released: 18 February 2026; Label: GLEAN; Format: CD | | |

==== Mini albums ====
| Year | Album details | Catalog No. | Peak Oricon chart position |
|---|---|---|---|
| 2018 | M.S COWBOY no Gyakushu (M・S COWBOYの逆襲): Released: 24 October 2018; Label: Lantis; Format: CD | LACA-35739 (Limited Edition), LACA-15739 (Regular Edition) | 11 |

==== Best albums ====
| Year | Album details | Catalog No. | Peak Oricon chart position |
|---|---|---|---|
| 2012 | Granrodeo B‐side Collection "W": Released: 15 February 2012; Label: Lantis; Format: CD | LASA-9023 | 25 |
| 2013 | Granrodeo Greatest Hits: Gift Registry: Released: 6 March 2013; Label: Lantis; Format: CD | LACA-9270 | 9 |
| 2015 | Granrodeo DECADE OF GR: Released: 30 September 2015; Label: Lantis; Format: CD | LACA-9414 | 5 |
| 2025 | DOUBLE DECADES OF GR: Released: 19 February 2025; Label: GLEAN; Format: CD | | |

==== Soundtrack albums ====
| Release date | Album | Song | Catalog No. |
|---|---|---|---|
| 2007.04.25 | Kikoshi Enma Original Soundtrack | Decadence [Short version] | LACA-5629 |
| 2007.06.27 | Kotetsushin Jeeg Original Soundtrack | Heaven (TV version) | LACA-5647 |
| 2008.09.10 | Blassreiter Original Soundtrack | "Detarame na Zanzō" (デタラメな残像) (TV size) | LACA-9123~4 |
| 2009.12.23 | Needless Original Soundtrack | Modern Strange Cowboy (TV size) | LASA-5032 |
| 2009.05.09 | Togainu no Chi Ending Theme Complete Collection | Grind "style GR" | LASA-5123 |
| 2012.09.26 | Kuroko no Basket Original Soundtrack | Can Do (TV Size), Rimfire (TV Size) | LACA-9248~9 |
| 2012.12.26 | Code:Breaker Original Soundtrack | Dark Shame (TV ver.) | LACA-9264 |

==== Compilation albums ====
| Release date | Album | Song | Catalog No. |
|---|---|---|---|
| 2006.12.06 | Muv-Luv Alternative Collection of Standard Edition Songs "Name" | Once&Forever | LACA-5575 |
| 2008.03.12 | TV Drama Cutie Honey The Live Vocal Album Metamorphoses | Outsider (アウトサイダー) | LACA-5737 |
| 2008.04.23 | @Lantis NonStop Dance Remix Vol.1 | Infinite Love | LACA-5767 |
| 2009.09.09 | Lantis 10th anniversary Best 090927 | Once&Forever | LACA-9161~2 |
| 2009.12.09 | Gundam Tribute from Lantis | Meguriai (めぐりあい) | LACA-5985 |
| 2012.09.28 | Muv-Luv Alternative Total Eclipse Vol.1 Bonus CD | No Place Like a Stage | AVXA-49879B |
| 2013.02.06 | "Muv-Luv (Game)" Series Vocal Shu | 0-Gravity, Once&Forever | LACA-9266 |
| 2013.02.06 | Total Eclipse Song Collection | No Place Like a Stage | AVCA-62137 |

=== Singles ===
| Year | Song | Catalog No. | Peak Oricon chart position | Album |
|---|---|---|---|---|
| 2005 | "Go For It!" (IGPX opening theme) | LACM-4230 | 71 | Ride on the Edge |
| 2006 | "Infinite Love" (Koi suru Tenshi Angelique (season 1) opening theme) | LACM-4275 | 43 | Ride on the Edge |
| 2006 | "Decadence" (Demon Prince Enma ending theme) | LACM-4285 | 83 | Ride on the Edge |
| 2007 | "Dokoku no Ame" (慟哭ノ雨) (Koi suru Tenshi Angelique (season 2) opening theme) | LACM-4336 | 33 | Ride on the Edge |
| 2007 | "Heaven" (Kotetsushin Jeeg ending theme) | LACM-4369 | 36 | Instinct |
| 2007 | "delight song" | LACM-4446 | 21 | Instinct |
| 2008 | "Not for Sale" (Game Duel Love theme song) | LACM-4482 | 34 | Instinct |
| 2008 | "Detarame na Zanzō" (デタラメな残像) (Blassreiter opening theme) | LACM-4483 | 22 | Instinct |
| 2008 | "Darlin'" | LACM-4552 | 20 | Instinct |
| 2009 | "Trance" (Black God 2nd opening theme) | LACM-4605 | 18 | Brush the Scar Lemon |
| 2009 | "modern strange cowboy'" (Needless opening theme) | LASM-4016 | 15 | Brush the Scar Lemon |
| 2009 | "Koi Oto" (恋音) | LASM-4039 | 20 | Supernova |
| 2010 | "We wanna R&R Show" | LASM-4054 | 18 | Non–album single |
| 2010 | "Rose Hip-Bullet" (Togainu no Chi opening theme) | LASM-34078/9 (Limited Edition), LASM-4078 (Regular Edition) | 7 | Supernova |
| 2011 | "Ai no Warrior" (Game Angelique: Maren no Rokukishi opening theme) | LASM-34120/1 (Limited Edition), LASM-4120 (Regular Edition) | 25 | Crack Star Flash |
| 2012 | "Can Do" (Kuroko's Basketball 1st opening theme) | LACM-34916/7 (Limited Edition), LACM-4916 (Regular Edition) | 14 | Crack Star Flash |
| 2012 | "Rimfire" (Kuroko's Basketball 2nd opening theme) | LACM-34948/9 (Limited Edition), LACM-4948 (Regular Edition) | 7 | Crack Star Flash |
| 2012 | "Dark Shame" (Code:Breaker opening theme) | LACM-34020 (Limited Edition), LACM-14020 (Regular Edition) | 12 | Karma to Labyrinth |
| 2013 | "Henai no Rondo" (偏愛の輪舞曲) (Karneval opening theme) | LACM-34066 (Limited Edition), LACM-14066 (Regular Edition) | 7 | Karma to Labyrinth |
| 2013 | "The Other self" (Kuroko's Basketball 2 1st opening theme) | LACM-34140 (Limited Edition), LACM-14140 (Regular Edition), LACM-14141 (Anime Edition) | 10 | Karma to Labyrinth |
| 2014 | "Hengenjizai no Magical Star" (変幻自在のマジカルスター) (Kuroko's Basketball 2 2nd opening theme) | LACM-34189 (Limited Edition), LACM-14189 (Regular Edition), LACM-14190 (Anime Edition) | 10 | Karma to Labyrinth |
| 2015 | "Punky Funky Love" (Kuroko's Basketball 3 1st opening theme) | LACM-34298 (Limited Edition), LACM-14298 (Regular Edition), LACM-14299 (Anime Edition) | 8 | Pierrot Dancin' |
| 2015 | "Memories" (メモリーズ) (Kuroko's Basketball 3 3rd opening theme) | LACM-34346 (Limited Edition), LACM-14346 (Regular Edition), LACM-14347 (Anime Edition) | 6 | Pierrot Dancin' |
| 2016 | "Trash Candy" (Bungō Stray Dogs 1 opening theme) | LACM-34465 (Limited Edition), LACM-14465 (Regular Edition), LACM-14466 (Anime Edition) | 9 | Pierrot Dancin' |
| 2016 | "Shōnen no Hate" (少年の果て) (Mobile Suit Gundam: Iron-Blooded Orphans second season 1st ending theme) | LACM-34555 (Limited Edition), LACM-14555 (Regular Edition) | 16 | Pierrot Dancin' |
| 2017 | "Glorious days" (Kuroko's Basketball The Movie: Last Game theme song) | LACM-34585 (Limited Edition), LACM-14585 (Regular Edition), LACM-14584 (Anime Edition) | 10 | FAB LOVE |
| 2017 | "move on! Ibara Michi" (move on! イバラミチ) (Saiyuki ReLoad Blast opening theme) | LACM-34625 (Limited Edition), LACM-14625 (Regular Edition), LACM-14626 (Anime Edition) | 12 | FAB LOVE |
| 2018 | "Deadly Drive" (Bungō Stray Dogs: DEAD APPLE opening theme) | LACM-34729 (Limited Edition), LACM-14729 (Regular Edition), LACM-14730 (Anime Edition) | 16 | FAB LOVE |
| 2018 | "Beastful" (Baki opening theme) | LACM-34772 (Limited Edition), LACM-14772 (Regular Edition) | 18 | FAB LOVE |
| 2019 | "Setsuna no Ai" (Bungō Stray Dogs 3 opening theme) | LACM-34867 (Limited Edition), LACM-14867 (Regular Edition), LACM-14868 (Anime Edition) | 9 | Question |
| 2021 | "Treasure Pleasure" (Baki Hanma opening theme) | LACM-34175 (Limited Edition), LACM-24175 (Regular Edition) | 18 | Question |
| 2022 | "Kamimo Hotokemo" (カミモホトケモ) (Saiyuki Reload: Zeroin opening theme) | LACM-34223 (Limited Edition), LACM-24223 (Regular Edition), LACM-24224 (Anime Edition) | 10 | Question |
| 2023 | "Tetsu no Ori" (鉄の檻) (Bungō Stray Dogs 5 opening theme) | LACM-34404 (Limited Edition), LACM-24404 (Regular Edition), LACM-24405 (Anime Edition) | 16 | Tetsu no Ori |

==== Collaboration Singles ====
| Year | Song | Catalog No. | Peak Oricon chart position | Album |
|---|---|---|---|---|
| 2014 | "7 -seven-" (The Seven Deadly Sins ending theme) (with FLOW) | KSCL-2513/4 (Limited Edition), KSCL-2515 (Regular Edition), KSCL-2516 (Anime Edition) | 10 | TBA |
| 2018 | "Howling" (The Seven Deadly Sins: Revival of the Commandments opening theme) (with FLOW) | KSCL-3013/4 (Limited Edition), KSCL-3015 (Regular Edition), KSCL-3016/7 (Anime Edition) | 12 | TBA |
