= Kishō Taniyama =

Japanese voice actor and singer (born 1975)

- 谷山 紀章
- Born: August 11, 1975 (age 51); Ube, Yamaguchi, Japan
- Other names: Kazuya Sugisaki; Kishow
- Education: Yoyogi Animation Academy
- Occupations: Voice actor, singer, lyricist
- Years active: 1995–present
- Agent: Ken Production
- Musical career
- Genres: J-pop, rock, hard rock, heavy metal, Anison
- Instrument: Vocals
- Label: Lantis

Kishō Taniyama (谷山 紀章, Taniyama Kishō; born August 11, 1975) is a Japanese voice actor, singer, and lyricist affiliated with Ken Production. He is also the vocalist and lyricist of the Japanese rock band Granrodeo under his stage name Kishow (also spelled Ki-Show). He is the official Japanese dubbing voice for Fred Jones in the Scooby-Doo franchise.

== Filmography ==
=== Anime ===
List of voice performances in anime
Year	Title	Role	Notes	Source
1997	The King of Braves GaoGaiGar	Nail		
1998	Sexy Commando Gaiden: Sugoi yo!! Masaru-san	Kawashima		
1999	Omishi Magical Theater Risky Safety	Wakatake		
2000	Hand Maid May	Juliano		
2001–02	One: Kagayaku Kisetsu e	Kōhei Orihara	OVA series	
2001	X	Daisuke Saiki, others		
2001–02	Captain Tsubasa Road to 2002	Luciano Leo		
2002	Digimon Frontier	Tomoki's brother		
2002	SaiKano	Take, Takamura		
2002	Shrine of the Morning Mist	Kishino		
2002	Getbackers	Ma		
2002	Kiddy Grade	Perkin		
2002	Weiß Kreuz Glühen	Sagiri		
2003	Ashita no Nadja	B's brother		
2003	Zatch Bell!	Albert		
2003	Rumbling Hearts	Takayuki Narumi		
2003	Bottle Fairy	Sensei-san		
2003	R.O.D the TV	Staff man		
2003	Bobobo-bo Bo-bobo	Shou Mei		
2004	Monkey Turn	Kazumi Kono		
2004	Daphne in the Brilliant Blue	Twink		
2004	Midori Days	Seiji Sawamura		
2004	Doki Doki School Hours	Joji Seki		
2004	Tetsujin 28th	Workman		
2004	Duel Masters Charge	Oasis		
2004	Enzai: Falsely Accused	Durer		
2004	DearS	Takeya Ikuhara		
2004	Monkey Turn V	Kazumi Kono		
2004	Beet the Vandel Buster	Lambert		
2004	Rockman.EXE Stream	SwallowMan		
2004	Tactics	Takahashi		
2004	Haruka: Beyond the Stream of Time: A Tale of the Eight Guardians	Tengu		
2004	Bleach	Kazeshini 風死		
2005	MÄR	Stanley		
2005	The Law of Ueki	B.J.		
2005	Best Student Council	Ryuuheita Iwazakura		
2005	Zoids Genesis	Ron Mangan		
2005	Petopeto-san	Jeremy Moriguchi		
2005	Rockman.EXE Beast	Zoano SwallowMan		
2005	Canvas 2: Niji Iro no Sketch	Shintaro Yanagi		
2005	Lamune	Kenji Tomosaka		
2005–09	Major	Akutsu, Hayashida	Starting from 2nd series	
2006	Renkin 3-kyuu Magical? Pokahn	Hyouga, others		
2006	Nishi no Yoki Majo: Astraea Testament	Eusis Roland		
2006	Tona-Gura!	Yuki Kogoro		
2006	La Corda D'Oro: primo passo	Len Tsukimori		
2006	Tokimeki Memorial Only Love	Ichiro Ishiuchi		
2006	Pumpkin Scissors	Viscount Wolkins		
2006	Buso Renkin	Shusui Hayasaka		
2006	Strain: Strategic Armored Infantry	Decon Sidnok		
2007	Gurren Lagann	Kittan		
2007	Over Drive	Takeshi Yamato		
2007	Kishin Taisen Gigantic Formula	Olivier Mirabeau		
2007	Big Windup!	Azusa Hanai		
2007	Devil May Cry	Ernest		
2007	Nanatsuiro Drops	Natsume Kisaragi		
2007	Sky Girls	Ryohei Tachibana		
2007	You're Under Arrest: Full Throttle	Spider		
2007	One Piece	Puzzle		
2007–08	Rumbling Hearts: Next Season	Takayuki Narumi	OVA series	
2008	Hatenkō Yugi	Soresta		
2008	Porphy no Nagai Tabi	Maximilian		
2008	S · A: Special A	Yahiro Saiga		
2008	Zettai Karen Children: Psychic Squad	Shūji Sakaki		
2008	Top Secret: The Revelation	Shinichi Saijo		
2008–09	Junjō Romantica series	Takahiro Takahashi		
2008	Antique Bakery	Atsushi		
2008	Legends of the Dark King: A Fist of the North Star Story	Judah ユダ		
2008–18	A Certain Magical Index series	Stiyl Magnus	Also II in 2010 & III in 2018	
2009	Chrome Shelled Regios	Sharnid Elipton		
2009	La Corda D'Oro: secondo passo	Len Tsukimori		
2009	Basquash!	Falcon Lightwing		
2009	Pandora Hearts	Glen Baskerville		
2009	Needless	Saten, Kannazuki Kyouji		
2010	Ōkiku Furikabutte ~Natsu no Taikai-hen~	Azusa Hanai		
2010	Duel Masters Cross Shock	Oasis		
2010	Sekirei: Pure Engagement	Nishi Sanada		
2010	Highschool of the Dead	Kōichi Shidō		
2010–11	Nura: Rise of the Yokai Clan series	Kiyotsugu Kiyojūji	Also Demon Capital	
2010	Panty & Stocking with Garterbelt	Ghost		
2010	Togainu no chi: Bloody Curse	Gunji		
2011–present	Uta no Prince-sama series	Natsuki Shinomiya		
2011	Mayo Chiki!	Butler B		
2011–13	Phi Brain: Puzzle of God series	Diceman		
2012	Shirokuma Cafe	Sloth		
2012–15	Kuroko's Basketball series	Tatsuya Himuro		
2012	Inazuma Eleven GO: Chrono Stone	Alpha		
2012	Hyouka	Punk		
2012	From the New World	Kōfū Hino		
2012	Code:Breaker	Former Code: 05		
2013	The Unlimited - Hyōbu Kyōsuke	Shūji Sakaki		
2013	Amnesia	Ikki		
2013–23	Attack on Titan	Jean Kirstein		
2013	Yondemasuyo, Azazel-san Z	Eurynome		
2013	Gaist Crusher	Gabbroic ハンレイ		
2013	Magi: The Kingdom of Magic	Lolo ロゥロゥ		
2014	No-Rin	Kaoru Hanazono		
2014	La Corda d'Oro Blue Sky	Chiaki Togane, Len Tsukimori		
2014	Bakumatsu Rock	Ryoma Sakamoto		
2015–21	Show by Rock!!	Crow		
2015	Junjo Romantica 3	Takahiro Takahashi		
2015	Attack on Titan: Junior High	Jean Kirstein		
2015	Hokuto no Ken: Ichigo Aji	Judah		
2016–present	Bungo Stray Dogs series	Chūya Nakahara		
2016	Kuromukuro	Yoruba		
2016	The Morose Mononokean	Joumatsu		
2016	JoJo's Bizarre Adventure: Diamond Is Unbreakable	Yuya Fungami		
2017	Love and Lies	Hajime Yajima		
2017	Dies Irae	Wilhelm Ehrenburg		
2017	Blue Exorcist: Kyoto Saga	Kinzo Shima		
2018	Magical Girl Ore	Magical Girl Everything Crazy Beauty		
2019	Ahiru no Sora	Kenji Natsume		
2020	Pet	Tsukasa		
2020	Boruto: Naruto Next Generations	Garashi Tono		
2020	The Misfit of Demon King Academy	Avos Dilhevia		
2020	Sleepy Princess in the Demon Castle	Hades		
2020	Moriarty the Patriot	Dudley Bale		
2021	Shaman King	Zen Yoneda		
2021	My Hero Academia 5	Ending		
2021	The World's Finest Assassin Gets Reincarnated in Another World as an Aristocrat	Setanta Macness		
2022	Love All Play	Kento Yusa		
2022	Tomodachi Game	Hyakutarō Onigawara		
2022	Bastard!! -Heavy Metal, Dark Fantasy-	Dark Schneider		
2022	Welcome to Demon School! Iruma-kun Season 3	General Furfur		
2023	Bastard‼ Heavy Metal, Dark Fantasy Season 2	Dark Schneider		
2023	The Kingdoms of Ruin	Shirousagi		
2024	Mashle: Magic and Muscles – The Divine Visionary Candidate Exam Arc	Renatus Revol		
2024	Frieren: Beyond Journey's End	Wirbel		
2024	An Archdemon's Dilemma: How to Love Your Elf Bride	Barbatos		
2024	Quality Assurance in Another World	Sakai		
2025	Dandadan	Toshiro		
2025–present	Sakamoto Days	Club Jam		
2026	The Daily Life of a Part-time Torturer	Hera		

=== Drama CDs ===
List of voice performances in drama CDs
Title	Role	Notes	Source
Buso Renkin	Shusui Hayasaka 早坂秋水		
DearS	Takeya Ikuhara		
A Certain Magical Index	Stiyl Magnus		

=== Film ===
List of voice performances in film
Year	Title	Role	Notes	Source
1998	Perfect Blue	Blue ブルー		
2007	Naruto Shippuden The Movie	Gitai		
2008	Gurren Lagann The Movie: Childhood's End	Kitan		
2009	Gurren Lagann The Movie: The Lights in the Sky are Stars	Kitan		
2010	Detective Conan: The Lost Ship in the Sky	Waiter		
2013	A Certain Magical Index: The Movie – The Miracle of Endymion	Stiyl Magnus		
2013	Aura: Koga Maryuin's Last War	Kinoshita 木下		
2018	Bungō Stray Dogs DEAD APPLE	Chūya Nakahara		
2021	Gekijōban Argonavis: Ryūsei no Obligato	Kōga Iryū		
2022	Uta no Prince-sama: Maji Love ST☆RISH Tours	Natsuki Shinomiya		

=== Video games ===
List of voice performances in video games
Year	Title	Role	Notes	Source
1999	Eternal Eden	King Solomon ソロモン王	PS1/PS2	
2003	Saikano	Bamboo / Nakamura タケ/ナカムラ	PS1/PS2	
2003–present	La Corda d'Oro series	Len Tsukimori, Chiaki Togane		
2004	Rumbling Hearts games	Takayuki Narumi	Adult PC	
2004	Monkey Turn V	Kazumi Kono	PS1/PS2	
2004	Suikoden 4	Snow スノウ	PS1/PS2	
2004–05	Zatch Bell! games	Albert		
2005	Togainu no Chi	Gunji	Adult PC	
2005	Bobobo-bo Bo-bobo escape! ! Pubic Royale	Over		
2005	Zettai Fukuju Meirei	Ashraf Ali Ibrahim	Adult PC	
2005	Angel's Feather series	Furuya Yukihiko 降谷幸彦	PS1/PS2 from Kuro	
2005–06	Yo-Jin-Bo games	Kasumimaru Fuuma	PC	
2005	Best Student Council	Iwasakura Ryuhei thick 岩桜龍平太	PS1/PS2	
2005	Yume Miru Kusuri	Hirofumi Tsubaki	Adult PC	
2006	Canvas 2: Niji Iro no Sketch	Shinichiro Yanagi 柳慎一郎	PS1/PS2	
2006	Muv-Luv	斯衛 troops commander 斯衛部隊指揮官	Adult PC	
2006– 07	Nanatsuiro Drops series	Kisaragi jujube 如月ナツメ	Also Pure	
2006	Palais de Reine	Ilya イリヤ	PC	
2007	Buso Renkin Welcome Papillon to Park	Shusui Hayasaka 早坂秋水	PS1/PS2	
2007	Big Windup! games	Azusa Hanai 花井梓	DS	
2008	Zettai Karen Children: DS fourth of Children 絶対可憐チルドレンDS 第4のチルドレン	Kenki Shuji 賢木修二	DS	
2009	Fist of the North Star Raoh Gaiden heaven of Overlord 北斗の拳 ラオウ外伝 天の覇王	Judah ユダ	PSP	
2009–10	Baldr Sky series	Gilbert Gilberto	Adult PC; As Kazuya Sugisaki	
2009	Little Anchor	Violet Lafarre ヴィオレ・ラファール		
2010	Hetalia: World Series	Germany		
2010–present	Uta no Prince-sama series	Natsuki Shinomiya		
2011	A Certain Magical Index games	Stiyl Magnus	PSP	
2011	Catherine	Tobias Nebbins	PS3	
2011–13	Starry Sky: After Summer series	Miyaji Takakai 宮地鷹介	PC	
2011	Aiyoku no Eustia	Lang Scrope	Adult PC; As Kazuya Sugisaki	
2011–14	Amnesia series	Ikki		
2011	Shin Megami Tensei: Devil Survivor	Naoya	3DS	
2011	Kajiri Kamui Kagura	Kyougetsu Keishirou 凶月刑士郎	Adult PC; As Kazuya Sugisaki	
2012–15	Kuroko's Basketball games	Tatsuya Himuro		
2012	E.X. Troopers	Chris Landbaird		
2012	Inazuma Eleven GO 2: Chrono Stone	Alpha	3DS	
2012	Inazuma Eleven GO Strikers 2013	Alpha	Wii	
2013	Inazuma Eleven GO: Galaxy	Alpha	3DS	
2014	Bakumatsu Rock series	Sakamoto Ryoma		
2014	Granblue Fantasy	Aoidos/Benjamin, Sho		
2016	Attack on Titan series	Jean Kirstein	PS3	
	Tokimeki Memorial Girl's Side: 2nd Kiss	Taro Majima		
	Cross Detective Story クロス探偵物語			
2017	9 Hours, 9 Persons, 9 Doors	Santa サンタ	PC/PS4/PSVITA	
2017	Fire Emblem Echoes: Shadows of Valentia	Gray		
2019	Fate/Grand Order	Mori Nagayoshi	Android/iOS	
2021	Monster Hunter Rise	Utsushi	Nintendo Switch, Windows, PlayStation 4, PlayStation 5, Xbox One and Xbox Series X/S	
2021	Shin Megami Tensei V	Ichiro Dazai	Nintendo Switch	
2023	JoJo's Bizarre Adventure: All Star Battle R	Yuya Fungami	PlayStation 5, Xbox Series X/S and Nintendo Switch	

=== Live-action ===
Year	Title	Role	Notes	Source
2022	Sono Koe no Anata e	Himself	Documentary film	
2023	Ohsama Sentai King-Ohger	Ohger Caliber, Ohger Crown Lance (voice)	Tokusatsu	

=== Other dubbing ===
List of voice performances in other dubbing
Title	Role	Notes	Source
Bad Boys for Life	Armando Aretas		
Black Rock 処刑島	Column/protagonist カラム/主役		
Code Name: Eternity	Diver		
Four Brothers	Jack		
Hit and Run	Rick		
Hot Shots!	Uzi Dung (Uzun) ウージー・ズン（ウーズン）		
Meteor Garden	Rui Hanazawa (Big Butterfly) 花沢類（ビックチョウ）		
NYPD Blue			
The Princess Diaries	Josh Bryant		
Robin Hood			
Temptation Island			
Twilight	Eric		
The Twilight Saga: New Moon	Eric		
War God Mars 戦神MARS	Rei Kashino (big Butterfly) 樫野零（ビックチョウ）		
Without a Trace	Kyle		
Growing Pains			
Fireman Sam			
New Looney Tunes	Axl Rose		
Scooby-Doo series	Freddy Jones		
Sing	Lance		
We Bare Bears	Panda		
Winning Time: The Rise of the Lakers Dynasty	Norm Nixon		

== Discography ==
Granrodeo

Main article: Granrodeo § Discography
- Ride on the Edge (2007)
- Instinct (2008)
- Brush the Scar Lemon (2009)
- Supernova (2011)
- Crack Star Flash (2012)

Stella Quintet (Stella Quintet+)

Main article: Stella Quintet § Singles
- Crescendo (single) (2006)
- Stella Quintet Players Side (2007)
- 蒼穹のスコア ~The score in blue~ (single) (2009)

Solo

- Daydreamin' (2005) (Single)
- Warrior (2005) (Single)
