= Duel Love =

2008 video game

- Developer: Namco Bandai Games
- Publisher: Namco Bandai Games
- Platform: Nintendo DS
- Release: JP: March 13, 2008
- Genre: Action Visual Novel
- Modes: Single-player, multiplayer

Duel Love (デュエルラブ 恋する乙女は勝利の女神) is a Japanese otome video game for the Nintendo DS by Namco Bandai Games. It was released on 13 March 2008 and the character designs and artwork were created by Hisaya Nakajo. The story concerns a female protagonist who becomes friends with the (male) members of her high school's boxing club. It is rated C for ages 15 and up by the Japanese board CERO.

== Gameplay ==
Three of the moods of a boy being dried off

Primarily a dating sim, the overall goal of the game is to form a relationship with the chosen character. There are also several minigames, in which the player assists the young men in training, cheers them on during matches (which affects their performance), treats their post-fight scrapes and bruises, peeks at them in the shower, gives them back rubs and wipes sweat off their chests. The game has not been announced for regions outside Japan but has received attention from non-Japanese gaming media for its quasi-sexual nature. In fact, in the part of the game which involves boys showering, the entire body is naked and the genitals are hidden by the gap between the top and bottom DS screens.

== Characters ==
Jin Yuki (結城 仁)
Voiced by Daisuke Namikawa
He's good at all sports and highly regarded at school. His cold attitude keeps people at a distance, so few girls approach him. He excels at boxing and has a well-toned physique, even among the B-1 competitors. His goal from the start has been to defeat the King. He often trains at the beach and is usually in the classroom during breaks.
Yuma Asakura (朝倉 勇馬)
Voiced by Jun Fukuyama
He never gets down in the dumps, and is a mood-maker at school. He's cheerful and treats girls like friends. He works part-time at a takoyaki stand in the park after school to support his not-so-wealthy family. He compliments the protagonist, calling her cute and like a flower.
Shinichiro Nagao (長尾 信一郎)
Voiced by Kouji Yusa
He's not very talkative, and often his words are insufficient. He's not good at expressing his emotions, which sometimes leads to misunderstandings. However, he will show a smile to people he trusts. Having trained at a prestigious family since childhood, he has been very active in B-1. He excels academically and is often found in the library. After school, he is often at a general store looking for ideas for the handicraft club.
Kei Ryuzoji (竜造寺 景)
Voiced by Ryoutaro Okiayu
He's a celebrity from a well-known family, but he's not arrogant about it and has a gentlemanly personality. He's an excellent student, good at sports, and has a great personality, making him the object of admiration for all students, both boys and girls. He's also a B-1 basketball player, and he ties his hair up when playing matches. After school, he's often found in the music room or near the train station.
Tomohiko Tachibana (立花 智彦)
Voiced by Yuuta Kasuya
He has the innocent look of a high schooler who never grew up. However, he has a cunning side. During middle school, he was often mistaken for a girl because of his appearance, and was teased every time. He would just stay silent instead of denying it because it was too much trouble, but that only made things worse, so in high school, he acts cheerful. Because his parents are busy with work, he lives with his grandparents. He hadn't practiced seriously until he was punched by King in front of the protagonist, but he started practicing after that.
Masayoshi Date (伊達 正義)
Voiced by Kazuya Nakai
He's the student council president at the academy and also the B-1 King. His route becomes available when certain conditions are met.
Marco Giannini (マルコ・ジャンニーニ)
Voiced by Junichi Suwabe
Atsushi Nikaidou (二階堂 敦也)
Voiced by Kenji Nojima
Tetsuya Nikaidou (二階堂 鉄也)
Voiced by Hisayoshi Suganuma
Kyoji Takigawa (滝川 恭士)
Voiced by Daisuke Ono
Akira Shimatsu (島津 晃)
Voiced by Tomokazu Sugita

- Seita Anekoji

== Manga ==
Serialized in The Hana to Yume (Hakusensha) from the March 25, 2008 issue (released February 15) to the April 1, 2009 issue (released February 27, 2009), and published in two volumes by Hana to Yume Comics. With character designs by Hisaya Nakajo, and illustrated by Sakura Hinata.

| No. | Release date | ISBN |
|---|---|---|
| 1 | October 17, 2008 | 978-4592182559 |
| 2 | April 17, 2009 | 978-4592182566 |

== Drama CD ==
A drama CD was released by Lantis under the title The Prince in Love is in Victory Heaven (恋する王子は勝利のヘブン, Koisuru Ouji wa Shouri no Hebun). It was released on August 27, 2008.
