= Unlimited (Shouta Aoi album) =

- Regular edition cover

Studio album by Shouta Aoi
- Released: April 22, 2015
- Genre: J-pop
- Length: 53:36
- Label: B-Green
- Producer: Elements Garden

Shouta Aoi chronology
Blue Bird (2013)	Unlimited (2015)	S (2016)

Singles from Unlimited
- 1. "Virginal" Released: January 15, 2014; 2. "True Hearts" Released: August 6, 2014; 3. "Himitsu no Kuchizuke" Released: December 3, 2014

Music video
- "Unlimited" on YouTube

Unlimited (stylized as UNLIMITED) is the debut (Note: Official descriptions for Shouta Aoi's discography lists his work released under the name "Showta" as separate from his current work, i.e. while Unlimited is his overall second studio album, it is the first album released under the name "Shouta Aoi" and official descriptions list it as his debut studio album.) studio album of Shouta Aoi and his second overall. The album was released on April 22, 2015.

== Background and release ==
Unlimited is Shouta Aoi's debut studio album and the first under his voice acting stage name. The album compiles songs from his previous singles, "Virginal", "True Hearts", and "Himitsu no Kuchizuke", as well as his work in the stage play Margarita: Sengoku no Tenshi-tachi, along with seven new original songs. The album was released on April 22, 2015 under the B-green label. The album was also released in two different limited edition versions with alternate covers and DVD exclusives. The limited edition A version's DVD exclusive contains the music video for "Unlimited" and making-of footage, while the limited edition B's version includes a short documentary and a dance lesson for the choreography featured in "Unlimited."

== Music ==
Aoi called the album his "crystal" and created it with an image of a "jewelry box", where each song was a "jewelry hunt", with listeners finding something new with every song. He worked with Elements Garden and requested them to produce songs where "multicolored gems would pop out when opened."

The album's title track, "Unlimited", was produced by Junpei Fujita and is a "digital-ic" dance tune that represents the key to Aoi's future activities. Aoi described the song as a duet with himself, where one side of him looks towards important events in the future while the other side of him looks at himself with a lack of self-confidence. The music video was shot over the course of two days and used four back-up dancers, two of whom previously appeared in the music video for "True Hearts." In the video, Aoi wore a costume he requested to contain the meaning of his past and future self. The dual concept also carried over to the CD cover shooting, where he is pictured "slowly removing" himself from his "past days."

Aside from seven new original songs, Unlimited also contained Aoi's singles previously released in 2014, including "Virginal", the ending theme song for Break Out; "True Hearts"; and "Himitsu no Kuchizuke." The album also contains Aoi's work in the stage play Margarita: Sengoku no Tenshi-tachi, with "Tenshi no Inori" was featured as the theme song as well as a CD version of the song "Sora wa Tomei na Chikai."

== Reception ==
The album debuted at #7 in the Oricon Weekly Albums Chart and Billboard Japan Top Album Sales, charting for 5 weeks.

== Track listing ==
All tracks are written by Elements Garden.

Album
No.	Title	Lyrics	Music	Arrangement	Length
1.	"Unlimited"	Rucca	Junpei Fujita (Elements Garden)	Junpei Fujita (Elements Garden)	4:28
2.	"Virginal"	Noriyasu Agematsu (Elements Garden)	Noriyasu Agematsu (Elements Garden)	Junpei Fujita (Elements Garden)	4:24
3.	"Himitsu no Kuchizuke"	Noriyasu Agematsu (Elements Garden)	Noriyasu Agematsu (Elements Garden)	Seima Iwahashi (Elements Garden)	4:50
4.	"Sora wa Tomei na Chikai (空は透明な誓い)"	Aki Hata	Hitoshi Fujima (Elements Garden)	Tomohiro Kita (Elements Garden)	4:30
5.	"Setsuna Drop"	Rucca	Ryutaro Fujinaga (Elements Garden)	Ryutaro Fujinaga (Elements Garden)	5:13
6.	"Split Memories"	Yoshikazu Kuwashima	Haruki Mori (Elements Garden)	Haruki Mori (Elements Garden)	4:36
7.	"Heaven!"	Rucca	Seima Iwahashi (Elements Garden)	Seima Iwahashi (Elements Garden)	3:30
8.	"Touch See Take Toriko (タッチ ツー テイク トリコ)"	Rucca	Tomohiro Kita (Elements Garden)	Tomohiro Kita (Elements Garden)	5:07
9.	"True Hearts"	Rucca	Noriyasu Agematsu (Elements Garden)	Daisuke Kikuta (Elements Garden)	4:53
10.	"No Weak, Yes Week" (stylized as "NO WEAK⇔YES WEEK")	Rucca	Hitoshi Fujima (Elements Garden)	Hitoshi Fujima (Elements Garden)	3:44
11.	"Tenshi no Inori (天使の祈り)"	Ayane Katsuki	Evan Call (Elements Garden)	Evan Call (Elements Garden)	3:43
12.	"Melodia"	Shouta Aoi	Shouta Aoi	Hitoshi Fujima (Elements Garden)	4:38
Total length:					53:36

Limited edition DVD (A version)
No.	Title	Length
1.	"Unlimited" (Music Video)
2.	"Making of"

Limited edition DVD (B version)
No.	Title	Length
1.	"Shouta Aoi's True Face Documentary (蒼井翔太の素顔がみえるドキュメンタリー映像)"
2.	"Choreography lecture (振付レクチャー)"

== Charts ==
Chart (2015)	Peak position
Billboard Japan Top Albums Sales	7
Oricon Weekly Albums Chart	7
