= True Hearts =

Single by Shouta Aoi

from the album Unlimited
- A-side: "True Hearts"
- B-side: "Burning Magic (BurniMagi)"
- Released: August 6, 2014
- Genre: J-pop
- Label: B-green
- Producer: Elements Garden

Shouta Aoi singles chronology
"Virginal" (2014)	"True Hearts" (2014)	"Himitsu no Kuchizuke" (2014)

Music video
- "True Hearts" on YouTube

"True Hearts" (stylized as "TRUE HEARTS") is the second (Note: Official descriptions for Shouta Aoi's discography lists his work released under the name "Showta" as separate from his current work. "True Hearts" is Aoi's 8th single overall, but official descriptions list it as his second single.) single by Shouta Aoi, released on August 6, 2014.

== Background and release ==
"True Hearts" is Shouta Aoi's second single released under his current stage name.

The single was released on August 6, 2014 under the B-green label, along with the B-side "Burning Magic (BurniMagi)." Along with the regular edition, two limited edition versions of the single were released with alternate covers and DVD exclusives. The limited edition A version's DVD exclusive contains the music video for "True Hearts" and making-of footage, while the limited edition B's version includes a digest video for Aoi's first concert, Shouta Aoi 1st Live: Virginal.

== Reception ==
"True Hearts" reached #13 on the Oricon Weekly Singles Chart and charted for 6 weeks. The song also debuted at #20 on the Billboard Japan Hot 100.

== Track listing ==
All tracks are written by Elements Garden.

Single
No.	Title	Lyrics	Music	Arrangement	Length
1.	"True Hearts"	Rucca	Noriyasu Agematsu (Elements Garden)	Daisuke Kikuta (Elements Garden)	5:00
2.	"Burning Magic (BurniMagi)" (BURNING☆MAGIC -バニ☆マジ-)	Shouta Aoi	Shouta Aoi	Hitoshi Fujima (Elements Garden)	3:45
3.	"True Hearts" (off vocal)	—	Noriyasu Agematsu (Elements Garden)	Daisuke Kikuta (Elements Garden)	5:00
4.	"Burning Magic (BurniMagi)" (off vocal)	—	Shouta Aoi	Hitoshi Fujima (Elements Garden)	3:41

Limited edition DVD (A version)
No.	Title	Length
1.	"True Hearts" (promotional video)
2.	"True Hearts" (making)

Limited edition DVD (B version)
No.	Title	Length
1.	"Blue Bird" (ブルーバード)
2.	"Gekka no Hana" (月下の華 lit. Moonlight Flower)
3.	"MC 1"
4.	"Ai no Sasameki Goto" (愛のささめきごと lit. Love Whispers)
5.	"MC 2"
6.	"Shot a Love!"
7.	"Yume no Tsuzuki" (ユメノツヅキ lit. The Dream Continues)
8.	"MC 3"
9.	"Virginal"
10.	"MC 4"
11.	"Kimi no Tonari de" (君のとなりで lit. By Your Side)
12.	"MC 5"
13.	"Shot a Love!"
14.	"MC 6"

== Charts ==
Chart	Peak position
Oricon Weekly Singles Chart	13
Billboard Japan Hot 100	20
