= Virginal (song) =

Single by Shouta Aoi

from the album Unlimited
- A-side: "Virginal"
- B-side: "Yume no Tsuzuki"
- Released: January 15, 2014
- Genre: J-pop; anison
- Length: 18:07
- Label: B-green
- Producer: Elements Garden

Shouta Aoi singles chronology
"Hikaru no Gen-chan" (2008)	"Virginal" (2014)	"True Hearts" (2014)

Music video
- "Virginal" on YouTube

"Virginal" is the debut (Note: Official descriptions for Shouta Aoi's discography lists his work released under the name "Showta" as separate from his current work. "Virginal" is Aoi's 7th single overall, but official descriptions list it as his debut single.) single by Shouta Aoi, released on January 15, 2014. The song served as the ending theme song to the show Break Out for the month of January 2014.

== Background and release ==
"Virginal" is Shouta Aoi's first single released under his current stage name. The song was used as the ending theme to the show Break Out for the month of January 2014.

The single was released on January 15, 2014 under the B-green label, along with the B-side "Yume no Tsuzuki." Along with the regular edition, a limited-edition version of the single was released with an alternate cover and a DVD exclusive containing the music video for "Virginal."

== Reception ==
"Virginal" reached #8 on the Oricon Weekly Singles Chart and charted for 4 weeks. The song also debuted at #22 on the Billboard Japan Hot 100.

== Track listing ==
All tracks are written by Elements Garden.

Single
No.	Title	Lyrics	Music	Arrangement	Length
1.	"Virginal"	Noriyasu Agematsu (Elements Garden)	Junpei Fujita (Elements Garden)	Junpei Fujita (Elements Garden)	4:26
2.	"Yume no Tsuzuki" (ユメノツヅキ lit. The Dream Continues)	Shouta Aoi	Tomohiro Kita (Elements Garden)	Tomohiro Kita (Elements Garden)	4:39
3.	"Virginal" (off vocal)	—	Junpei Fujita (Elements Garden)	Junpei Fujita (Elements Garden)	4:26
4.	"Yume no Tsuzuki" (off vocal)	—	Tomohiro Kita (Elements Garden)	Tomohiro Kita (Elements Garden)	4:36
Total length:					18:07

Limited edition DVD
No.	Title	Length
1.	"Virginal" (promotional video)
2.	"Virginal" (making)

== Charts ==
Chart	Peak position
Oricon Weekly Singles Chart	8
Billboard Japan Hot 100	22
