= Blue Bird (EP) =

EP by Shouta Aoi
- Released: June 26, 2013
- Genre: J-pop
- Label: B-green
- Producer: Elements Garden

Shouta Aoi chronology
| Eve (2008) | Blue Bird (2013) | Unlimited (2015) |

Blue Bird (ブルーバード, Buru Bado) is the debut extended play of Japanese singer Shouta Aoi and the first physical release under a new stage name from his voice acting career. The album was released on June 26, 2013 and compiles songs from Aoi's work with Broccoli. The album was produced by Elements Garden.

== Background and release ==
Blue Bird is the debut mini album of Shouta Aoi and the first album release under his new stage name from when he entered voice acting. The album was released under Broccoli's music label, B-green, on June 26, 2013.

Aoi selected the name Blue Bird for his album, which was meant to picture "flying" and "sending feelings" over to his fans and people who supported him over the years. He opted for a "simple" and "elegant" shot for the album's cover, which features him against a black background with lighting against him. The image itself was meant as a direct contrast to Aoi's typically "soft" image.

== Composition ==
Aoi worked with Elements Garden while recording the album's title track, "Blue Bird", mentioning that it was difficult for him to record. "Blue Bird" was the image of a "bluebird of happiness" and was a song meant for the fans who supported him. The lyrics for the album's tracks took longer than the song's composition.

The album compiles songs he worked on for Broccoli's drama CD series, as well as some original songs. "Ai no Sasameki Goto" was the theme song for the drama CD series Sangokushi Lovers and was the first song he released as Shouta Aoi. "Gekka no Hana" was the theme song for the drama CD series Ikemen Ooku.

== Reception ==
The album debuted at #20 in the Oricon Weekly Albums Chart and charted for 4 weeks.

== Track listing ==
All tracks are written by Elements Garden.

| No. | Title | Lyrics | Music | Arrangement | Length |
|---|---|---|---|---|---|
| 1. | "Blue Bird" (ブルーバード) | Noriyasu Agematsu (Elements Garden) | Noriyasu Agematsu (Elements Garden) | Junpei Fujita (Elements Garden) | 4:32 |
| 2. | "Gekka no Hana" (月下の華 lit. Moonlight Flower) | Ayane Katsuki | Junpei Fujita (Elements Garden) | Junpei Fujita (Elements Garden) | 4:46 |
| 3. | "Ai no Sasameki Goto" (愛のささめきごと lit. Love Whispers) | Rucca | Masato Nakayama (Elements Garden) | Masato Nakayama (Elements Garden) | 4:17 |
| 4. | "Shot a Love!" | Rucca | Daisuke Kikuta (Elements Garden) | Daisuke Kikuta (Elements Garden) | 4:59 |
| 5. | "Kimi no Tonari de" (君のとなりで lit. By Your Side) | Rucca | Hitoshi Fujima (Elements Garden) | Hitoshi Fujima (Elements Garden) | 4:54 |

== Charts ==
| Chart (2013) | Peak position |
|---|---|
| Oricon Weekly Albums Chart | 20 |
