= Himitsu no Kuchizuke =

Single by Shouta Aoi

from the album Unlimited
- A-side: "Himitsu no Kuchizuke"
- B-side: "Glitter Wish"
- Released: December 3, 2014
- Genre: J-pop; anison
- Length: 18:29
- Label: B-green
- Producer: Elements Garden

Shouta Aoi singles chronology
| "True Hearts" (2014) | "Himitsu no Kuchizuke" (2014) | "Murasaki" (2015) |

Music video
- "Himitsu no Kuchizuke" on YouTube

"Himitsu no Kuchizuke" (秘密のクチヅケ; lit. "Secret Kiss") is the third (Note: Official descriptions for Shouta Aoi's discography lists his work released under the name "Showta" as separate from his current work. "Himitsu no Kuchizuke" is Aoi's 9th single overall, but official descriptions list it as his third single.) single by Shouta Aoi, released on December 3, 2014. "Himitsu no Kuchizuke" served as the ending theme song to the show Break Out for the month of December 2014, while the B-side, "Glitter Wish", was the theme song to the OVA This Boys Suffers From Crystallization.

== Background and release ==
"Himitsu no Kuchizuke" is Shouta Aoi's third single released under his current stage name. The song was used as the ending theme song to the show Break Out for the month of December 2014, while the B-side, "Glitter Wish", was the theme song to the OVA This Boy Suffers From Crystallization, which Aoi also starred in as Ayumu Tamari.

The single was released on December 3, 2014, under the B-green label, along with the B-side "Glitter Wish." Along with the regular edition, a limited-edition version of the single was released with an alternate covers and a DVD exclusive featuring the music video for "Himitsu no Kuchizuke."

== Reception ==
"Himitsu no Kuchizuke" reached #11 on the Oricon Weekly Singles Chart and charted for 4 weeks. The song also debuted at #20 on the Billboard Japan Hot 100.

== Track listing ==
All tracks are written by Elements Garden.

Single
| No. | Title | Lyrics | Music | Arrangement | Length |
|---|---|---|---|---|---|
| 1. | "Himitsu no Kuchizuke" (秘密のクチヅケ lit. Secret Kiss) | Noriyasu Agematsu (Elements Garden) | Noriyasu Agematsu (Elements Garden) | Seima Iwasaki (Elements Garden) | 4:50 |
| 2. | "Glitter Wish" | Shouta Aoi | Shouta Aoi | Hitoshi Fujima (Elements Garden) | 4:26 |
| 3. | "Himitsu no Kuchizuke" (off vocal) | — | Noriyasu Agematsu (Elements Garden) | Seima Iwasaki (Elements Garden) | 4:50 |
| 4. | "Glitter Wish" (off vocal) | — | Shouta Aoi | Hitoshi Fujima (Elements Garden) | 4:23 |
| Total length: | | | | | 18:29 |

Limited edition DVD
| No. | Title | Length |
|---|---|---|
| 1. | "Himitsu no Kuchizuke" (promotional video) |
| 2. | "Himitsu no Kuchizuke" (making) |

== Charts ==
| Chart | Peak position |
|---|---|
| Oricon Weekly Singles Chart | 11 |
| Billboard Japan Hot 100 | 20 |
