= Shouta Aoi =

Japanese singer and actor (born 1987)

- 蒼井 翔太
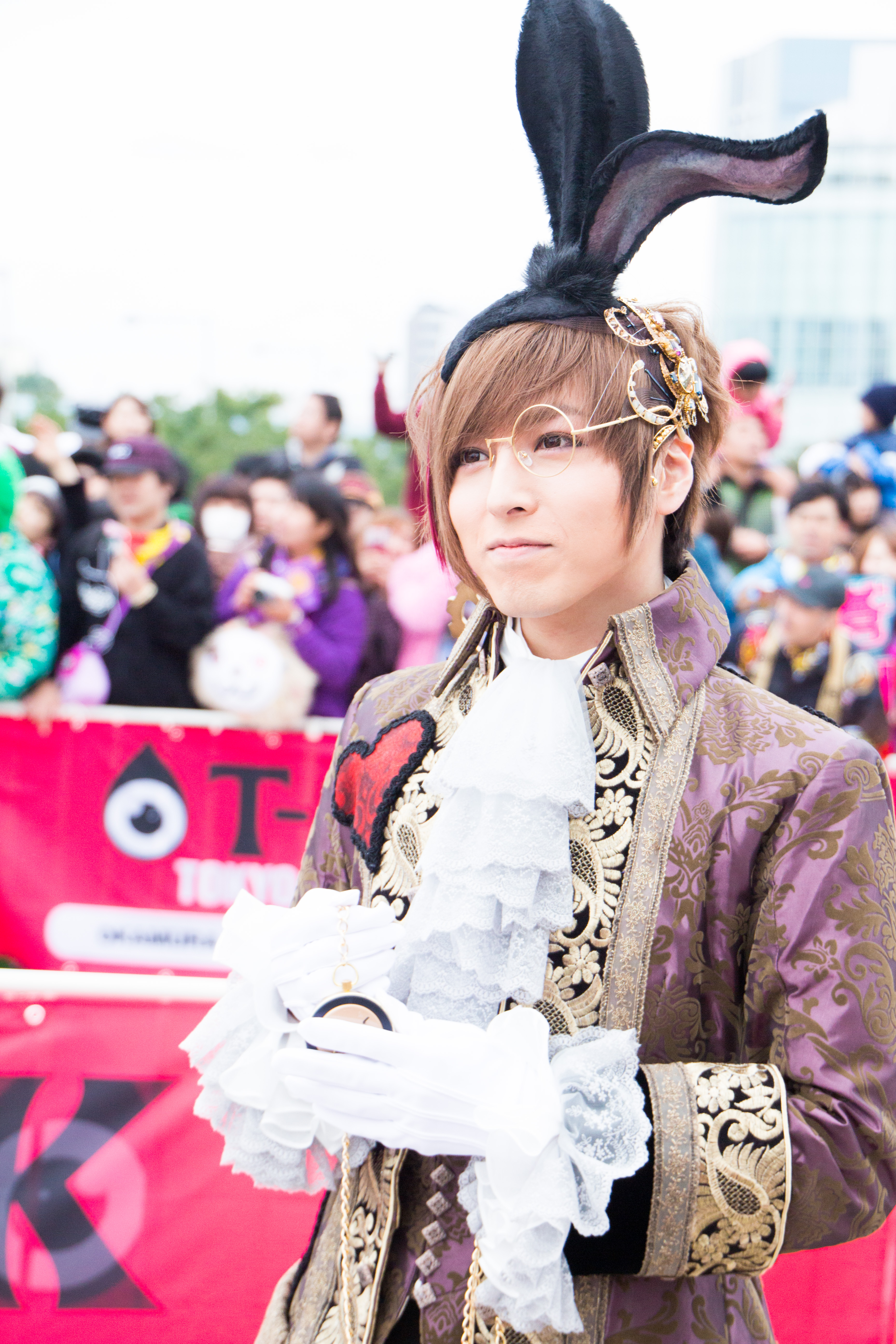
- Aoi at T-Spook 2016 on October 30, 2016
- Born: August 11, 1987 (age 39); Fukui Prefecture, Japan
- Other names: Noboru Yanagawa (柳川 昇) (2004); Showta (2006-2009); Noboru Ryugaki (柳ヶ木 昇) (2009-2010)
- Occupations: Singer; actor
- Years active: 2006–present
- Height: 174 cm (5 ft 9 in)
- Musical career
- Genres: J-pop; anime song
- Labels: King Records (2006-2009, 2016-present); B-Green (2011-2016)
- Website: www.shouta-aoi.jp

Shouta Aoi (蒼井 翔太, Aoi Shōta; born August 11, 1987), is a Japanese singer and actor. Under the stage name Showta (stylized as "SHOWTA."), he debuted as a singer with the song "Negaiboshi" in 2006 and released his first studio album, Eve, in 2008. In 2009, he left his agency and briefly released music independently under the pseudonym Noboru Ryugaki (柳ヶ木 昇).

After making his acting debut as Saki Hanajima in the Fruits Basket musical in 2009, Aoi has been involved in multiple musical theatre productions, including Sakuya Shiomi in Persona 3: The Weird Masquerade. In 2011, he began voice acting and gained media attention after voicing Ai Mikaze from Uta no Prince-sama. Since then, he has been recognized for roles such as Hideaki Tojo from Ace of Diamond, Monet Tsukushi in the Magic-kyun! Renaissance series, Rui Minazuki from the Tsukiuta series, Louis Kisaragi from King of Prism series, and Licht von Glanzreich from The Royal Tutor.

In 2013, Aoi relaunched his singing career under his new stage name with the extended play Blue Bird, followed by the release of "Virginal" in 2014. In 2015, he released his first studio album, Unlimited. Since the relaunch of his music career, his music is produced by Elements Garden.

Throughout his career, Aoi has been given titles such as "Archangel" and was praised for his "angelic" singing voice. He is known for his soft, high-pitched voice and androgynous appearance, allowing him to play female parts as well.

== Early life ==
Aoi was born in Fukui Prefecture, Japan. He has one older sister. From elementary to high school, he played tennis and won many trophies. As a child, he watched a lot of anime and played video games, citing his interest in voice acting through Akira Ishida's portrayal of Fish Eye from Sailor Moon SuperS. In school, he was bullied for his high-pitched, feminine voice. He credits his friends from junior high school for helping him regain his confidence after they complimented his performance of "So Into You" by Koda Kumi during a karaoke outing. In 2004, he competed in the Yamaha Teens' Music Festival under the name "Noboru Yanagawa" and won the Grand Prix for the Tokai, Ibaraki region. Initially, when he first auditioned, he had mistakenly believed it was an amateur karaoke competition. He was a finalist at the national competition, along with Ataru Nakamura, where he performed "1000 no Kotoba" by Koda Kumi.

== Career ==
=== 2006–2010: Musical debut, Eve, and indies activities ===
Aoi debuted under the name Showta with the single "Negaiboshi" on July 26, 2006, under King Records, which charted at #119 on the Oricon Weekly Singles Chart. On November 22, 2006, he released his second single, "Trans-winter (Fuyu no Mukōgawa)", which served as the theme song to the live-action television adaptation of the manga Damens Walker. His third single, "Hito Shizuku", a mid-tempo ballad, was released on April 4, 2007. His fourth single, "Kimi ni, Kaze ga Fukimasu You ni" was released on July 27, 2007, as the ending theme song to Ichiteru. For his fifth single, he released a cover of Yoshie Kashiwabara's 1983 song "Haru na no ni" on January 23, 2008.

Aoi released his first studio album, Eve, on March 5, 2008, which charted at #115 on the Oricon Weekly Albums Chart. His sixth single, "Hikaru no Gen-chan", was released on April 23, 2008, for NHK's Minna no Uta segments during the months of April and May. In 2009, Aoi contributed the song "Ekubo" to the movie soundtrack of Kanna-san Daiseiko Desu! the Movie, which was released as a promotional digital single. He made his first acting appearance as Saki Hanajima in the Fruits Basket stage play adaptation.

In 2010, Aoi left King Records, citing his desire to become a voice actor and theme song performer. He began releasing music and performing independently under the name Noboru Ryugaki. He was a featured artist in the song "Oji-sama to Cheek" on Kenzo Saeki and Boogie the Mach Motors' collaboration album, 21-Seiki-san sings Harlmens. During this time, he also performed in independent musical theatre and stage productions.

=== 2011–2016: Voice acting debut and stage activities ===
Aoi signed onto S Inc. in 2011 for voice acting and debuted under the name Shouta Aoi, making his first appearance as Kanshiki in the game Black Robinia. He performed "Ai no Sasameki Goto" as the first song released under his new stage name, which served as the theme song to the drama CD series Sangokushi Lovers. In October, he voiced Ryunosuke Matsushita in the anime Kimi to Boku and also performed the songs "Sora", "Tomorrow" and "Over" for the show's soundtrack.

In 2012, Aoi was cast as Ai Mikaze in the Uta no Prince-sama media franchise, where he performed and sang several songs for the character in the game and anime soundtracks. After gaining recognition from the success of his role, Aoi released his first extended play, Blue Bird, on January 13, 2013, which contained theme songs he performed for Broccoli drama CDs. On January 15, 2014, Aoi released his first single, "Virginal", under his stage name, as the ending theme song to Break Out, which was then followed by his first concert, Shouta Aoi 1st Live: Virginal. On August 6, 2014, he released his second single, "True Hearts." Alongside of singing and voice acting, Aoi continued participating in stage productions, including playing Sakuya Shiomi in the Persona 3: The Weird Masquerade musicals.

In late 2014, Aoi was cast as Ayumu Tamari in the OVA This Boy Suffers From Crystallization, his first leading role in animation. He also provided the theme song, "Glitter Wish", which was later released as the B-side to his third single, "Himitsu no Kuchizuke", on December 3, 2014. In 2015, he released his first studio album, Unlimited, which charted at #7 on the Oricon Weekly Albums Chart. Aoi's fourth single, "Murasaki", was released on September 2, 2015, serving as the theme song to the stage musical Prince Kaguya, which he also starred in as the title character. On February 3, 2016, he released the single "Zessei Stargate" as the opening theme song to Phantasy Star Online 2: The Animation, in which he also voiced the character Itsuki Tachibana.

=== 2016–present: Label change ===
Aoi returned to King Records in 2016. During that year, both B-green and King Records released compilation albums of his previous works, S and Showta Best. After changing labels, Aoi released his sixth single, "Innocent", as the opening theme song to First Love Monster on July 27, 2016, in which he also played Renren. His seventh single, "DDD", was released October 19 as the theme song to Future Card Buddyfight DDD, a series in which he also played recurring character Gaito Gurenzo. On January 25, 2017, Aoi released the song "Flower", which was the ending theme song for the variety show King's Brunch for the month of January. On October 11, 2017, he released his second studio album, Zero, which sold 11,361 copies within its first week.

On May 9, 2018, Aoi released the song "Eclipse" as the opening theme song to Devils' Line, in which he also appeared in as Kenichi Yoshii. In 2019, he provided the narration to Dimension High School and later appeared in the show as Shiro Oide, his first role in live-action television. On April 10, 2019, Aoi released his ninth single, "Tone", as the opening theme song to Kono Oto Tomare! Sounds of Life, in which he was also cast as Mio Kanzaki. On May 3, 2019, a set of 24 voiced stickers featuring Aoi for the messaging application Line was released, based on his radio show Shouta Aoi: Hungry Night. In September 2019, Aoi appeared in the live-action television drama Real Fake as Akane.

On October 10, 2022, Aoi released "Psycho:Logy" as a digital single; the title song was used as the opening theme of the second season of Pop Team Epic. On October 15, 2022, Aoi announced that he has left his management company S and will be working freelance.

== Public image ==
Since the beginning of his career, Aoi has been recognized for his soft, high-pitched voice and has been given nicknames such as "archangel" and "angelic singing voice." He is also branded as being a "genderless singer" due to his androgynous voice and appearance, which allowed him to play female roles. In a survey conducted by Anime! Anime!, 50% women and 50% men in the questionnaire ranked him as #2 as the voice actor with the most "angelic" voice. Aoi himself became an Internet meme following his appearance in Pop Team Epic, in which the studio responded by releasing exclusive merchandise of him. In 2018, Aoi was the second most-followed voice actor on Twitter in Japan.

== Other ventures ==
=== Endorsements ===
Aoi has appeared in commercials for CyberStep Toreba 2D. In 2016, Aoi appeared and sang in the commercial for Lotte's Lady Borden ice cream along with Yuki Kaji and Kenshō Ono.

=== Collaborations ===
In 2017, Denon produced a collaboration headphone set with Aoi, and he also starred in their commercial. In April 2018, Sanrio released a fashion collaboration line with Aoi and Little Twin Stars, featuring a character based on himself named "Shoutan" and Tamutamu, a character Aoi personally designed. The character line ranked #5 in the 2018 Sanrio Character Ranking in the collaborations category. Sanrio distributed a mini album for the Shoutan character performed by Aoi himself, titled Twinkle Star.

== Discography ==
=== As Showta ===
Studio albums

- Eve (2008)

Compilation albums

- Showta Best (2016)

=== As Shouta Aoi ===
Studio albums

- Unlimited (2015)
- Zero (2017)
- Detonator (2023)

Mini albums

- Blue Bird (2013)

Compilation albums

- S (2016)

== Filmography ==
=== Theatre ===
Year	Title	Role	Notes
2009	Fruits Basket	Saki Hanajima, female student	Also acted as Saki Hanajima in the Strawberry Team version; double-cast with Yosuke Kogawa; credited as Showta
2009	It Runs in the Family	Nurse	—
2010	Shibuya × Akiba	Takashi	Credited as Noboru Ryugaki
2010	Moon War: Tsuki ga Kiiro ka, Shiro, Kuro ka...	Atra	Credited as Noboru Ryugaki
2013	In a Grove	Female suspect	—
2013	Yoha na Bokura (余白な僕ら)	Atsuo	—
2013	The Ascenscion of K, or His Death by Drowning	Boku	—
2014	Persona 3: The Weird Masquerade: The Blue Awakening	Sakuya Shiomi	
2014	Shunpu Gaiden	Momoyako	—
2014	Persona 3: The Weird Masquerade: The Ultramarine Labyrinth	Sakuya Shiomi	
2014	Valkyrie: Story from Rhine Gold	Ask Embra	—
2014	Phantasy Star Online 2: On Stage	Takuya	—
2015	Shunpu Gaiden	Momoyako	—
2015	Persona 3: The Weird Masquerade: The Bismuth Crystals	Sakuya Shiomi	
2015	Prince Kaguya	Aoi, Kaguya	
2016	Relic: Tale of the Last Ninja	Shōji Jinnai	
2016	The Smile Mermaid	Marina	
2017	Persona 3: The Weird Masquerade: The Indigo Pledge and Beyond the Blue Sky	Sakuya Shiomi	
2017	Le Petit Prince	The Prince	
2017	The Royal Tutor	Licht von Glanzreich	
2019	The Royal Tutor: Musical II	Licht von Glanzreich	
2019	West Side Story: Season 1	Tony	Double-cast with Mamoru Miyano
2021	ROAD59 -Shin Jidai Ninkyō Tokku-	Benedict Lorenzo Vasari	

=== Anime ===
Year	Title	Role	Notes
2011	Kimi to Boku	Ryunosuke Matsushita	—
2012	Kimi to Boku 2	Ryunosuke Matsushita	—
2013	Uta no Prince-sama Maji Love 2000%	Ai Mikaze	—
2014	Shōnen Hollywood: Holly Stage for 49	Daiki Tomii	—
2014	Rage of Bahamut: Genesis	Michael	—
2015	Shōnen Hollywood: Holly Stage for 50	Daiki Tomii	—
2015	Ace of Diamond	Hideaki Tōjō	
2015	Uta no Prince-sama Maji Love Revolutions	Ai Mikaze	—
2015	Ace of Diamond: Second Season	Hideaki Tōjō	—
2015	The Transformers: Mystery of Convoy	Cliff	—
2015	Fist of the North Star: Strawberry Flavor	Lin	
2016	Phantasy Star Online 2 The Animation	Itsuki Tachibana	—
2016	Prince of Stride: Alternative	Tōya Natsunagi	—
2016	Future Card Buddyfight DDD	Gaito Kurouzu	—
2016	First Love Monster	Renren	—
2016	Tsukiuta. The Animation	Rui Minazuki	—
2016	Handa-kun	Sōsuke Kojika	—
2016	Uta no Prince-sama Maji LOVE Legend Star	Ai Mikaze	—
2016	Magic-kyun! Renaissance	Monet Tsukushi	
2016	Kiss Him, Not Me	Akane	—
2017	Marginal#4: Kiss kara Tsukuru Big Bang	Tsubasa Shindō	—
2017	Kenka Bancho Otome: Girl Beats Boys	Takayuki Konparu	—
2017	Chiruran: Nibun no Ichi	Sanosuke Harada	—
2017	Future Card Buddyfight X	Gaito Kurouzu	—
2017	The Royal Tutor	Licht von Grannzreich	—
2017	Symphogear AXZ	Cagliostro	—
2017	Dynamic Chord	Narumi Amagi	—
2018	Pop Team Epic	Himself (episode 12, 14)	
2018	Real Girl	Yuuto Itō	
2018	Devils' Line	Kenichi Yoshii	
2018	Caligula	Kagi-P/Kensuke Hibiki	
2018	The Thousand Musketeers	Springfield	
2019	Dimension High School	Dimensional Messenger, Shiro Oide	
2019	Meiji Tokyo Renka	Rentaro Taki (episode 7)	—
2019	Real Girl 2nd Season	Yuuto Itō	—
2019	Ace of Diamond Act II	Hideaki Tōjō	—
2019	Kono Oto Tomare! Sounds of Life	Mio Kanzaki	
2019	King of Prism: Shiny Seven Stars	Louis Kisaragi	
2019	Carole & Tuesday	Pyotr	
2020	My Next Life as a Villainess: All Routes Lead to Doom!	Geordo Stuart	
2020	My Roomie Is a Dino	Himself (episode 1, 2)	
2020	Princess Connect! Re:Dive	Kaiser Insight	
2020	Tsukiuta. The Animation 2	Rui Minazuki	
2021	2.43: Seiin High School Boys Volleyball Team	Akito Kanno	
2021	Joran: The Princess of Snow and Blood	Makoto Tsukishiro	
2021	My Next Life as a Villainess: All Routes Lead to Doom! X	Geordo Stuart	—
2021	Cardfight!! Vanguard overDress	Yu-yu Kondo	—
2021	Visual Prison	Hyde Jayer	
2022	She Professed Herself Pupil of the Wise Man	Cleos	
2022	Cardfight!! Vanguard will+Dress	Yu-yu Kondo	
2022	Detective Conan: The Culprit Hanzawa	Makoto Hanzawa	
2024	The Banished Former Hero Lives as He Pleases	Allen	
2024	A Terrified Teacher at Ghoul School!	Akira Takahashi	
2025	Disney Twisted-Wonderland: The Animation	Ortho Shroud	
2027	Shin Kochira Katsushika-ku Kameari Kōen Mae Hashutsujo	Keiichi Nakagawa	

=== Films ===
Year	Title	Role	Notes
2016	King of Prism by Pretty Rhythm	Louis Kisaragi	Voice
2017	King of Prism: Pride the Hero	Louis Kisaragi	Voice
2019	The Royal Tutor	Licht von Glanzreich	Voice
2019	King of Prism: Shiny Seven Stars	Louis Kisaragi	Voice
2019	Uta no Prince sama Movie Maji Love Kingdom	Ai Mikaze	Voice
2021	Pretty Guardian Sailor Moon Eternal: The Movie -Part 1-	Fisheye	Voice
2023	My Next Life as a Villainess: All Routes Lead to Doom! The Movie	Geordo Stuart	Voice
2023	Wish	Gabo	Voice Dubbing
2025	Dream Animals: The Movie	Hippo	Voice

=== Video games ===
Year	Title	Role	Notes
2011	Black Robinia	Kanshiki	Debut voice acting role
2013—present	Uta no Prince-sama series	Ai Mikaze	
2014	Granblue Fantasy	Elta	
2014	Sky Lore	Travelling Prince	
2014	Voice Meets Girl: Luck of Cinderella	Shouta Kiriya	
2015	Cafe Cuillere	Minato Sakuma	
2015	Kobayashi ga Kawai Sugite Tsurai!! Game demo Kyun Moe Max ga Tomaranai	Chinaga Uesugi	
2015	Thousand Memories	Lizard, Dennis	
2015	Taishō × Taishō Alice	Snow White	—
2015	Ninmu suikō	Shō Tsuzuki	
2015	Prince of Stride	Tōya Natsunagi	
2015	100 Sleeping Princes and the Kingdom of Dreams	Sai, Michiru	
2015	Band Yarouze!	Asahi Ohtori	—
2016	Magic-kyun! Renaissance	Monet Tsukushi	—
2016	The Caligula Effect	Kagi-P/Kensuke Hibiki	—
2016	Kenka Bancho Otome: Girl Beats Boys	Takayuki Konparu	—
2017	Akane-sasu Sekai de Kimi to Utau	Mori Ranmaru	—
2018	Meiji Tokyo Renka: Haikara Date	Rentaro Taki	
2018	Princess Connect! Re:Dive	Kaiser Insight	—
2018	Dream!ing	Shion Mikekado	
2018	Starry Palette	Sakurai Toma	—
2018	Ikémen Vampire: Temptation in the Dark	Isaac Newton	—
2019	Bungou to Alchemist	Lewis Carroll	—
2019	Overhit	Lilith	—
2019	Ikémen Sengoku: Romances Across Time	Mori Ranmaru	—
2020	Disney: Twisted-Wonderland	Ortho Shroud	
2020	Collar × Malice	Yasuhiro Isshiki	—
2021	Blaster Master Zero Trilogy	Leibniz	—
2021	The Legend of Heroes: Trails Through Daybreak	Melchior	—
2022	Cardfight!! Vanguard Dear Days	Yu-yu Kondo	
2022	Dragon Quest Treasures	Euston	
2023	Fire Emblem Engage	Rosado	

=== Drama CD ===
Year	Title	Role	Notes
2013–present	Tsukiuta series	Rui Minazuki	
2013	Sengoku Soine	Ishida Mitsunari	
2014	Ginga Idol Cho Kareshi	Chizane	
2014–present	Happy Sugar Darlin' series	Ranran Kurumiya	
2016	Fresh Kiss 100%	Ruka	
2016	Moso Kareshi	Kuro	
2017	Dynamic Chord	Nal	
2017	Heiko Sekai to Hakoniwa Heya	Asanaga Shijyo, Osamu Shijyo	
2017	Blackish House	Sera	
2017–18	Otodoke Kareshi series	Haruka Hinata	
2018	Marginal Lover	Tsubasa	
2019	Makai Ōji-sama no Chōzetsu Amayakashi Drama CD	Prince of the Demon World	
2021	Magia Circus DramaCD 〜 It's Showtime 〜	Ciel	
2021	Fabulous Night	Algernon	

=== Original video animation (OVA) ===
Year	Title	Role	Notes
2014	This Boy Suffers From Crystallization	Ayumu Tamari	
2021	Hakuoki	Hyōgo Sakai	

=== Live-action and variety shows ===
Year	Title	Role	Network	Notes
2014–2016	Motefuku	Member	Television Saitama	—
2014–present	Animate Ongakan	Host	Animate Channel	
2015–present	Night also Shouta Aoi	Host	Nico Live	
2015	Shouta Aoi Aozora sunshine with Joymax	Host	YouTube	
2017–present	Otawamure	Host	Fuji TV	—
2019	Real Fake	Akane Kaburagi	MBS TV	
2020	Kikenna Venus	Sherry	TBS	
2021	Real Fake 2nd STAGE	Akane Kaburagi	MBS TV	

== Tours ==
- Shouta Aoi 1st Live: Virginal (2014)
- Shouta Aoi 2nd Live: Unlimited (2015)
- Shouta Aoi LIVE: 2016 WONDER lab. 〜Bokutachi no (僕たちの) sign〜 (2016)
- Shouta Aoi LIVE: 2017 WONDER lab. 〜prism〜 (2017)
- Shouta Aoi LIVE: 2017 WONDER lab. Ø (2017)
- Shouta Aoi LIVE: 2019 WONDER lab. I (2019)
- Shouta Aoi LIVE: 蒼井翔太 ONLINE LIVE at 日本武道館 うたいびと (2021)
- Shouta Aoi LIVE: 2021–2022 WONDER lab. coRe (2021–2022)
- Shouta Aoi LIVE: 2022 WONDER lab. Garden (2022)
