= Blackguard (manga) =

Japanese manga series

- First volume cover

ブラックガルド (Burakkugarudo)
- Genre: Dark fantasy
- Manga
- Written by: Ryo Hanada
- Published by: Kodansha
- English publisher: NA: Vertical
- Magazine: Monthly Morning Two
- Original run: September 20, 2019 – October 21, 2021
- Volumes: 5
- icon

Blackguard (Japanese: ブラックガルド, Hepburn: Burakkugarudo) is a Japanese manga series written and illustrated by Ryo Hanada. It was serialized in Kodansha's seinen manga magazine Monthly Morning Two from September 2019 to October 2021, with its chapters collected in five tankōbon volumes.

== Publication ==
Blackguard, written and illustrated by Ryo Hanada, was serialized in Kodansha's seinen manga magazine Monthly Morning Two from September 20, 2019, to October 21, 2021. Kodansha collected its chapters in five tankōbon volumes, released from February 21, 2020, to December 23, 2021.

In June 2021, Vertical announced the English release of the manga in North America. The five volumes were released from April 26 to November 22, 2022.

=== Volumes ===
No.	Original release date	Original ISBN	English release date	English ISBN
1	February 21, 2020	978-4-06-518525-4	April 26, 2022	978-1-64-729115-0
2	August 20, 2020	978-4-06-520267-8	May 3, 2022	978-1-64-729116-7
3	February 22, 2021	978-4-06-522264-5	August 9, 2022	978-1-64-729117-4
4	July 20, 2021	978-4-06-524221-6	August 30, 2022	978-1-64-729151-8
5	December 23, 2021	978-4-06-526222-1	November 22, 2022	978-1-64-729162-4

== See also ==
- Devils' Line, another manga series by the same author
