= Devils' Line =

Japanese manga series

- First tankōbon volume cover, featuring Yūki Anzai

デビルズライン (Debiruzu Rain)
- Genre: Dark fantasy
- Manga
- Written by: Ryo Hanada
- Published by: Kodansha
- English publisher: NA: Vertical
- Magazine: Monthly Morning Two
- Original run: March 22, 2013 – December 22, 2018
- Volumes: 13 (+1 short story)
- Anime television series
- Directed by: Hideaki Nakano (Note: Yoshinobu Tokumoto was originally credited as the director of the series, with Nakano as assistant director. Later, Nakano took the role of director, with Ryouma Mizuno as assistant director.)
- Produced by: Yoshihiko Yamazaki; Kisara Takahashi; Kazumi Satiō
- Written by: Kenji Konuta; Ayumu Hisao
- Music by: Kana Shibue
- Studio: Platinum Vision
- Licensed by: Sentai Filmworks: SEA: Medialink; UK: MVM Entertainment
- Original network: AT-X, Tokyo MX, BS11, Sun TV, KBS
- Original run: April 7, 2018 – June 23, 2018
- Episodes: 12 + OVA
- Manga

Devils' Line II: Trigger
- Written by: Ryo Hanada
- Published by: Kodansha
- Magazine: Morning Two
- Original run: January 20, 2022 – present
- Volumes: 7
- icon

Devils' Line (Japanese: デビルズライン, Hepburn: Debiruzu Rain) is a Japanese manga series written and illustrated by Ryo Hanada. It was serialized in Kodansha's seinen manga magazine Monthly Morning Two from March 2013 to December 2018. The manga is licensed for English release in North America by Vertical. An anime television series adaptation by Platinum Vision aired from April to June 2018.

== Plot ==
In modern Japan, vampires live peacefully among humans. Yūki Anzai, a half human, half-vampire, is a member of the Metropolitan Police Department's Public Safety Division 5 and is in charge of cracking down on vampire crimes. During an investigation on a series of vampire murders, he meets graduate student Tsukasa Taira, and the two are drawn to each other, and soon become embroiled in a conspiracy involving the "CCC", an organization that schemes to eliminate vampires, and the mastermind behind the plot.

== Characters ==
Yūki Anzai (安斎結貴, Anzai Yuki)
Voiced by: Yoshitsugu Matsuoka (Japanese); Adam Gibbs (English)
Yūki is a half vampire on his paternal side. He works as part of division 5.
Tsukasa Taira (平つかさ, Taira Tsukasa)
Voiced by: Yui Ishikawa (Japanese); Luci Christian (English)
Hans Lee (李ハンス, Ri Hansu)
Voiced by: Ryōhei Kimura
Takashi Sawazaki (沢崎孝, Sawasaki Takashi)
Voiced by: Yoshimasa Hosoya (Japanese); Justin Doran (English)
Juliana Lloyd (ジュリアナ・ロイド, Juriana Roido)
Voiced by: Miyuki Sawashiro (Japanese); Carli Mosier (English)
Kirio Kikuhara (菊原桐郎, Kikuhara Kirirō)
Voiced by: Takahiro Sakurai
Takeshi Makimura (牧村武史, Makimura Takeshi)
Voiced by: Hiroshi Kamiya
Nanako Tenjō (天城那々子, Tenjō Nanako)
Voiced by: Nao Tōyama
Kenichi Yoshii (吉井健一, Yoshii Ken'ichi)
Voiced by: Shouta Aoi (Japanese); Nathan Wilson (English)
Yōsuke Asami (朝海洋祐, Asami Yōsuke)
Voiced by: Kazuyuki Okitsu
Naoya Ushio (牛尾直也, Ushio Naoya)
Voiced by: Ryōta Ōsaka
Megumi Ishimaru (石丸惠巳, Ishimaru Megumi)
Voiced by: Akira Ishida
Midori Anzai (安斎みどり, Anzai Midori)
Voiced by: Mayumi Asano
Tamaki Anzai (安斎環, Anzai Tamaki)
Voiced by: Mamoru Miyano
Shōta Akimura (秋村肖太, Akimura Shōta)
Voiced by: Hiro Shimono (Japanese); Scott Searles (English)
Ryūsei Yanagi (柳劉生, Yanagi Ryūsei)
Voiced by: Satoshi Hino (Japanese); John Ramirez (English)
Ryūnosuke Katagiri (片桐龍之介, Katagiri Ryūnosuke)
Voiced by: Daisuke Hirakawa

== Media ==
=== Manga ===
Devils' Line, written and illustrated by Ryo Hanada, was serialized in Kodansha's seinen manga magazine Monthly Morning Two from March 22, 2013, to December 22, 2018. A series of extra chapters were published in the magazine from January 22 to May 22, 2019. Kodansha collected its chapters in thirteen tankōbon volumes, released from September 20, 2013, to February 22, 2019. An additional volume, listed as fourteenth, was released on June 21, 2019.

In North America, the manga was licensed for English release by Vertical. The fourteen volumes were released from May 24, 2016, to March 24, 2020. Kodansha USA published the series digitally.

A sequel manga series, titled Devils' Line II: Trigger (デビルズラインII［逆襲(トリガー)］, Debiruzu Rain Tsū Torigā), began serialization in Morning Two on January 20, 2022. The magazine ceased print publication and move to a digital release starting on August 4, 2022. Kodansha released the first tankōbon volume on June 22, 2022. As of September 22, 2025, seven volumes have been released.

==== Volumes ====
No.	Original release date	Original ISBN	English release date	English ISBN
1	September 20, 2013	978-4-06-387255-2	May 24, 2016	978-1-942993-37-7
1. "Dark Side" (ダークサイド, Dāku Saido); 2. "Safe House" (セーフハウス, Sēfu Hausu); 3. "Merry Christmas" (メリークリスマス, Merī Kurisumasu); 4. "Paradox" (パラドクス, Paradokusu); 5. "Head Shot" (ヘッドショット, Heddo Shotto); 6. "Monster" (モンスター, Monsutā)
2	April 23, 2014	978-4-06-388329-9	July 26, 2016	978-1-942993-38-4
7. "Out of Control" (アウトオブコントロール, Auto obu Kontorōru); 8. "Under Control" (アンダーコントロール, Andā Kontorōru); 9. "Plan B" (プランB, Puran B); 10. "I Love You" (アイラブユー, Ai Rabu Yū); 11. "Human" (ヒト, Hito); 12. "Survival Time" (サバイバルタイム, Sabaibaru Taimu)
3	August 22, 2014	978-4-06-388363-3	September 27, 2016	978-1-942993-39-1
13. "Secret Matter" (シークレットマター, Shīkuretto Matā); 14. "Incident Room" (インシデントルーム, Inshidento Rūmu); 15. "Double Cross" (ダブルクロス, Daburu Kurosu); 16. "Dogmatic" (ドグマティック, Dogumatikku); 17. "Face" (フェイス, Feisu); Special: "Line of Zero" (ゼロの線路, Zero no Senro)
4	January 23, 2015	978-4-06-388418-0	December 6, 2016	978-1-942993-40-7
18. "Restart" (リスタート, Risutāto); 19. "Chaser" (チェイサー, Cheisā); 20. "Lock On" (ロックオン, Rokku On); 21. "Metamorphose" (メタモルフォーゼ, Metamorufōze); 22. "First End" (ファーストエンド, Fāsuto Endo); "Terrorists' Side" (テロリストサイド, Terorisuto Saido)
5	June 23, 2015	978-4-06-388470-8	February 21, 2017	978-1-942993-62-9
23. "Copy" (コピー, Kopī); 24. "Don't Cry" (ドントクライ, Donto Kurai); 25. "Offline" (オフライン, Ofurain); 26. "Near" (ニア, Nia); 27. "Command" (コマンド, Komando); Sketch: "Break Time" (ブレイクタイム, Bureiku Taimu)
6	November 20, 2015	978-4-06-388533-0	April 11, 2017	978-1-942993-91-9
28. "Support Tech Gardens" (サポートテックガーデンズ, Sapōto Tekku Gādenzu); 29. "Ego Defense" (エゴディフェンス, Ego Difensu); 30. "Zero Seven" (ゼロナナ, Zero Nana); 31. "Isolation" (アイソレーション, Aisorēshon); 32. "Who Are You" (フーアーユー, Fū Ā Yū); 29.5: "Go Nowhere" (ゴー ノーウェア, Gō Nō Wea)
7	April 22, 2016	978-4-06-388588-0	June 6, 2017	978-1-945054-00-6
33. "Children" (チルドレン, Chirudoren); 34. "Outsider" (アウトサイダー, Autosaidā); 35. "Inferno" (インフェルノ, Inferuno); 36. "Ouroboros (ウロボロス, Uroborosu); 37. "Second End" (セカンドエンド, Sekando Endo); 3.5: "C U T" (CUT)
8	September 23, 2016	978-4-06-388634-4	August 15, 2017	978-1-945054-17-4
38. "Dive ①" (ダイブ1, Daibu 1); 39. "Dive ②" (ダイブ2, Daibu 2); 40. "Ask the Dark" (アスク ダーク, Asuku Dāku); 41. "Stand Back" (スタンドバック, Sutando Bakku); 42. "Mother's Devils' Line" (マザーズ デビルズライン, Mazāzu Debiruzu Rain); 41.5: "Cloak" (クローク, Kurōku)
9	February 23, 2017	978-4-06-388698-6; ISBN 978-4-06-362352-9 (SE)	October 3, 2017	978-1-945054-31-0
43. "Closer" (クローサー, Kurōsā); 44. "Familiar" (ファミリア, Famiria); 45. "Corvus Corax" (ワタリガラス, Watarigarasu); 46. "ReMI" (ReMI); 47. "Scapegoat" (スケープゴート, Sukēpugōto); 46.5: "Heart" (ハート, Hāto)
10	July 21, 2017	978-4-06-510047-9; ISBN 978-4-06-510059-2 (SE)	March 6, 2018	978-1-945054-52-5
11	March 23, 2018	978-4-06-510807-9	August 21, 2018	978-1-947194-12-0
12	August 23, 2018	978-4-06-512639-4; ISBN 978-4-06-512883-1 (SE)	February 12, 2019	978-1-947194-72-4
13	February 22, 2019	978-4-06-514670-5; ISBN 978-4-06-514671-2 (SE)	August 6, 2019	978-1-947194-63-2
14	June 21, 2019	978-4-06-516025-1; ISBN 978-4-06-515494-6 (SE)	March 24, 2020	978-1-947194-87-8

==== Devils' Line II: Trigger ====
No.	Japanese release date	Japanese ISBN
1	June 22, 2022	978-4-06-528191-8
2	November 22, 2022	978-4-06-529857-2
3	May 23, 2023	978-4-06-531747-1
4	December 21, 2023	978-4-06-533587-1
5	September 20, 2024	978-4-06-536842-8
6	March 21, 2025	978-4-06-538763-4
7	September 22, 2025	978-4-06-540681-6

=== Anime ===
An anime adaptation was announced in Monthly Morning Two on July 22, 2017. The series is directed by Hideaki Nakano at animation studio Platinum Vision, with Ryouma Mizuno serving as assistant director. Kenji Konuta and Ayumu Hisao have written the series. Pony Canyon Enterprises produced the series. The music is composed by Kana Shibue and recorded by King Records. The opening theme song is "Eclipse" by Shouta Aoi, and the ending theme song is "Sotto Toketeyuku Yō ni" by Mamoru Miyano. The series aired from April 7 to June 23, 2018. It broadcast on AT-X, Tokyo MX, BS11, Sun TV, and KBS Kyoto.

Sentai Filmworks have licensed the series in North America, the British Isles, Australasia, and other regions, and streamed the series on Hidive. MVM Entertainment released the series in the United Kingdom and Ireland. Medialink licensed the series in Southeast Asia, streaming it on its Ani-One Asia YouTube channel.

==== Episodes ====
No.	Title (Note: All English titles are taken from Hidive.)	Original release date
1	"Dark Side"; Transliteration: "Dākusaido" (Japanese: ダークサイド)	April 7, 2018
Tsukasa thought she knew everything about Akimura. She's unsuspectedly rescued from half-devil, Anzai, who works with the police force specializing in devil-related crime.
2	"Safe House"; Transliteration: "Sēfuhausu" (Japanese: セーフハウス)	April 14, 2018
Trouble arises and blood is shed as Tsukasa tries to make sense of her new lustful feelings towards Anzai.
3	"Paradox"; Transliteration: "Paradokusu" (Japanese: パラドクス)	April 21, 2018
Anzai takes refuge with Tsukasa after being suspended. Meanwhile, the authorities are on the lookout for a missing murder suspect.
4	"Monster"; Transliteration: "Monsutā" (Japanese: モンスター)	April 28, 2018
A sniper is out for revenge. Another random passing half-devil helps Anzai to recover by giving him a taste of blood.
5	"Plan B"; Transliteration: "Puran B" (Japanese: プラン B)	May 5, 2018
Devils throughout Kanto Region are transforming after witnessing a slasher attack broadcast on live TV. Tsukasa suggests a new method to extend Anzai's lifespan.
6	"Dogmatic"; Transliteration: "Dogumatikku" (Japanese: ドグマティック)	May 12, 2018
Tsukasa is confronted about her relationship with Anzai. Anzai is called back into duty to take care of an emergency situation as he learns to accept his demon instincts.
7	"Chaser"; Transliteration: "Cheisā" (Japanese: チェイサー)	May 19, 2018
As Anzai is struggling to keep a distance from Tsukasa in order to protect her, she is kidnapped by a devil hunter.
8	"Offline"; Transliteration: "Ofurain" (Japanese: オフライン)	May 26, 2018
After being involved in a risky situation, Tsukasa asks Anzai if they are dating. Will Anzai be able to control his bloodlust in a relationship with her?
9	"Command"; Transliteration: "Komando" (Japanese: コマンド)	June 2, 2018
Operations within the police force get shaken up as Lieutenant Ishimaru becomes the new leader of F Squad.
10	"Ego Defense"; Transliteration: "Ego Difensu" (Japanese: エゴディフェンス)	June 9, 2018
Anzai's ability to control his transformation is severely tested as he is confronted by a person from his past seeking revenge.
11	"Ouroburos"; Transliteration: "Uroborosu" (Japanese: ウロボロス)	June 16, 2018
Immediately after Lieutenant Ishimaru issues a deployment ban on devils from the CCC, the police force ends up in a risky situation.
12	"Devils' Line"; Transliteration: "Debiruzu Rain" (Japanese: デビルズライン)	June 23, 2018
Tsukasa is willing to risk everything to rescue Anzai. Anzai learns about his past as he recovers from his injuries.
OVA	"Anytime Anywhere" (Japanese: デビルズライン エニタイム エニウェア)	August 23, 2018

== See also ==
- Blackguard, another manga series by the same author
