= Masato Saki =

Japanese actor and singer

- 碕 理人
- Born: 1 March 1991 (age 34); Kyoto Prefecture, Japan
- Occupations: Actor, singer
- Years active: 2010–present
- Agent: Bamboo
- Height: 1.79 m (5 ft 10 1/2 in)
- Website: Masato Saki

Masato Saki (碕 理人, Saki Masato; born March 1, 1991 in Kyoto Prefecture) is a Japanese actor and singer, best known for portraying Kenya Oshitari in the Tenimyu musicals. He is represented by Bamboo.

== Filmography ==
=== Television ===
- Music Station (TV Asahi) as Dancer
- London Hearts Friday (2013, TV Asahi) as Seike
- Kamisama no Bōto (2013, NHK-BS)
- Friday Prestige: Gekai Hatomura Shugoro Yami no Chart (2014, Fuji Television)
- Watashitachi ga Puropōzu sa Renai ni wa, 101 no riyū ga atteda na (2015, LaLa TV) as Suzuki
- Butaimon hansamu rakugo awā #9 (2016, Tokyo MX)
- Shūkatsu Kazoku ~Kitto, umaku iku~ (2017, TV Asahi) as Host

=== Movies ===
- Vanilla Boy: Tomorrow Is Another Day (2016) as Kikuhara

=== Theater ===
- Asuhe no Tobira as Dancer
- Tsuki no Kyōshitsu as Tetsuya
- Harō guddobai
- Godzilla as Godzilla
- Sutēji doa as Sam Hesting
- in the blue (2011) as Matsuoka
- Orenji Inochi no Kiseki (2012, Hakuhinkan Theater) as Various
- Pool Side Story (2012, Akashi Studio) as Ippei Nakajima
- Stand by Me (2012, Studio twl) as Man
- Nemurenu machi no Oji-sama (2012, Space Zero) as Jin
- 〜Rōdoku ☆ Danshi〜 Haru no Rōdoku Shūkan Jōnetsu no Arika (2013, Sasazuka Factory) as Liúdōu Niibori
- Nemurenu machi no Oji-sama 〜dreams like bubbles of champagne〜 (2013, Theatre sunmall) as Jin Ōsaka
- Tenimyu (2013) as Kenya Oshitari
  - Seigaku vs. Shitenhoji (2013, Nippon Seinenkan)
  - Undoukai 2014 (2014, Yokohama Arena)
  - Seigaku vs. Rikkai ~ Nationals (2014, Tokyo Dome City Hall)
  - Budōkan 2014 (2014, Nippon Budokan)
  - Dream Live 2014 (2014, Saitama Super Arena)
- How to kill a cat in New York (2014, Theater Green) as Yū Matsuki
- Hāto no Kuni no Arisu ~Wandafuru Wandā Wārudo~ (2015, Space Zero) as Ace
- Fushigi Yūgi (2015, Shinagawa Prince Hotel) as Yado Tsubasa
- Moon & Day 〜Uchi no Tamashi Rimasen ka?〜 (2015, Space Zero) as Masayuki Sakai
- Nemurenu Yoru no Honkītonkuburūsu Dainishō 〜hiyaku〜 (2015, Kinokuniya Hall) as Rintarō
- A. & C. -Adult Children- (2015, The Pocket) as Danchi
- Katakoi. (2015, The Pocket) as Guest
- La Corda d'Oro: Blue♪Sky First Stage (2015, Space Zero) as Chiaki Tōgane
- Gei-sai (2015, The Pocket)
- Seishun -Aoharu- Tetsudō (2015, Space Zero) as Guest
- Prince Kaguya (2015, Hakuhinkan Theater) as San
- Mayonaka no Yaji-san Kita-san (2016, Tokyo Dome City) as Guest
- Hāto no Kuni no Arisu 〜The Best Revival〜 (2016, Space Zero) as Ace
- Hansamu rakugo dai nana-maku (2016, Red Theater)
- Akatsuki no Yona (2016, Ex Theater Roppongi) as Soo-Won
- Kujira no Kora wa Sajō ni Utau (2016, AiiA 2.5 Theater Tokyo) as Ryodari
- Devils and Realist (2016, Space Zero) as Gilles de Rais
- Tarō Urashima (2016, Meiji-za) as Hiramen
- Jōzu ~Takarakuji Atattande Yarimasu~ (2016, Haiyuza Theater) as Guest
- La Corda d'Oro: Blue ♪ Sky Prelude of Ikishikan (2016, Theatre senjyu) as Chiaki Tōgane
- Hansamu rakugo dai hachi-maku (2016, CBGK Shibugeki!!)
- La Corda d'Oro: Blue♪Sky Second Stage (2016, Space Zero) as Chiaki Tōgane
- Hochikisu myūjiamu (2017, Nakano Theater) as Guest
- Prefecture Puzzle 2017 (2017, Theater Guide) as Tōru Kamoshita
- Tabi Neko Report (2017, Hakuhinkan Theater) as Nana / Satoru
- Sengoku Wars (2017, Tokyo Metropolitan Art Space) as Oda Nobukatsu, Shibata Katsuie
- Snow Princess (2017, Space Zero) as Chris
- Hakuohki SSL: Sweet School Life ~The Stage Route~ (2017, Theater Sunmall) as Nagakura Shinpachi
- Sorekara (2017, Haiyuza Theater) as Guest
- Acharaka (2017, Kichijoji Theater) as Jakū
- Yume ōkoku to nemureru 100-ri no Oji-sama ~Prince Theater~ (2017, AiiA 2.5Theater Tokyo) as Hatter
- Rengoku ni Warau (2017, Sunshine Theatre) as Momochi Shishimon
- Devils and Realist: The Second Spirit (2017, Shijuku Face) as Gilles de Rais
- The Years of the Winter Camp in the Meiji Period Festival (2017, Umeda Arts Theater) as one of the Sanada Ten Braves
