= Symphogear =

Japanese anime television series

- Key visual for Symphogear AXZ, featuring protagonist Hibiki Tachibana (center) and other lead characters

戦姫絶唱シンフォギア (Senki Zesshō Shinfogia)
- Genre: Magical girl; Musical; Science fiction
- Created by: Akifumi Kaneko; Noriyasu Agematsu
- Manga
- Written by: Akifumi Kaneko; Noriyasu Agematsu
- Illustrated by: Dan Yoshii
- Published by: Kadokawa Shoten
- Magazine: Newtype Ace
- Original run: December 10, 2011 – March 9, 2013
- Volumes: 3
- Anime television series
- Directed by: Tatsufumi Itou
- Produced by: Tsuyoshi Oda; Keisuke Hori; Yuusuke Morii; Atsushi Shimada; Masama Saijou
- Written by: Akifumi Kaneko
- Music by: Elements Garden: Noriyasu Agematsu; Hitoshi Fujima; Junpei Fujita
- Studio: Satelight (Note: During the broadcast release of the series, Satelight was originally credited as アニメーション制作協力 (Animation Work Assistance) for the first two episodes of the series, and thereafter credited as アニメーション制作 (Animation Work). In the Blu-ray release, however, Satelight is credited for Animation Work in the first two episodes as well.); Encourage Films (Note: During the broadcast release of the series, Encourage Films was originally credited with アニメーション制作 (Animation Work) for the first two episodes of the series, and thereafter credited as Animation Planning.In the Blu-ray release, however, Encourage Films is solely credited as Animation Planning for the season.); Studio Pastoral (#3) (Note: The ending credits to episode 3 list Studio Pastoral for Animation Work.)
- Licensed by: Crunchyroll (streaming); NA: Discotek Media
- Original network: Tokyo MX, tvk, TVA, CTC, MBS
- Original run: January 6, 2012 – March 30, 2012
- Episodes: 13
Further information
Anime television series
Symphogear G
Directed by	Katsumi Ono
Produced by	Yuusuke Morii
Written by	Akifumi Kaneko
Music by	Elements Garden: Noriyasu Agematsu; Junpei Fujita; Hitoshi Fujima; Evan Call
Studio	Satelight
Licensed by	Crunchyroll (streaming); NA: Discotek Media
Original network	MBS, TVA, BS11, Tokyo MX
Original run	July 4, 2013 – September 26, 2013
Episodes	13 + 2 OVA
Anime television series
Symphogear GX
Directed by	Katsumi Ono
Produced by	Yuusuke Morii
Written by	Akifumi Kaneko
Music by	Elements Garden: Junpei Fujita; Hitoshi Fujima; Evan Call
Studio	Satelight
Licensed by	Crunchyroll (streaming); NA: Discotek Media
Original network	MBS, Tokyo MX, TVA, BS11
Original run	July 4, 2015 – September 25, 2015
Episodes	13 + 4 OVA
Anime television series
Symphogear AXZ
Directed by	Katsumi Ono
Produced by	Yuusuke Morii
Written by	Akifumi Kaneko
Music by	Elements Garden: Junpei Fujita; Hitoshi Fujima
Studio	Satelight
Licensed by	Crunchyroll (streaming); NA: Discotek Media
Original network	Tokyo MX, BS11, TVA, MBS
Original run	July 1, 2017 – September 30, 2017
Episodes	13 + 4 OVA
Anime television series
Symphogear XV
Directed by	Katsumi Ono
Produced by	Yuusuke Morii
Written by	Akifumi Kaneko
Music by	Elements Garden: Junpei Fujita; Hitoshi Fujima
Studio	Satelight
Licensed by	Crunchyroll (streaming); NA: Discotek Media; SA/SEA: Medialink
Original network	Tokyo MX, BS11, MBS, TVA, AT-X
Original run	July 6, 2019 – September 28, 2019
Episodes	13 + 4 OVA
Manga
Senki Kanshoku Symphogear: Shirabe Meshi
Written by	Tsutanoha
Published by	Takeshobo
Magazine	Storia Dash
Original run	June 11, 2021 – present
Volumes	7
- icon

Senki Zesshō Symphogear (Japanese: 戦姫絶唱シンフォギア, Hepburn: Senki Zesshō Shinfogia; lit. 'Superb Song of the Valkyries: Symphogear'), also known as simply Symphogear, is a Japanese anime television series produced by Satelight. The original season aired on Tokyo MX between January and March 2012. The second season entitled Symphogear G aired between July and September 2013, The third season, Symphogear GX, aired between July and September 2015, and the fourth season, Symphogear AXZ, aired between July and September 2017. The fifth and final season, Symphogear XV, aired between July and September 2019. A manga adaptation was serialized in Kadokawa Shoten's Newtype Ace magazine between December 2011 and March 2013. A mobile game titled Symphogear XD Unlimited was released in June 2017 in Japan.

== Plot ==
Two idols, Tsubasa Kazanari and Kanade Amō, collectively known as Zwei Wing, battle against an alien race known as Noise using armor known as Symphogear, which uses the power of music to counteract the Noise's destructive capability. However, Kanade sacrifices herself to protect a girl named Hibiki Tachibana, who ends up with a piece of Kanade's Symphogear relic, Gungnir, embedded in her chest. Two years later, Hibiki awakens the power of the Gungnir relic inside her body, gaining the same Symphogear armor that Kanade had. Using the power of song, Hibiki and her fellow Symphogear wielders must fight to protect the innocent and defeat those who would use the Noise for evil.

== Characters ==
=== Symphogear Users ===
Symphogear Adaptors are individuals capable of wielding a Symphogear (シンフォギア, Shinfogia), an powered armament system created by converting an ancient mythological artifact into a gem-like relic crystal, where each Candidate (適合者, Tekigōsha; lit. 'suitable person') bonds with a ruby-like relic (聖遺物, Seiibutsu) shard that generates their unique Symphogear through Phonic Gain (フォニックゲイン, Fonikku Gein), an energy source in the form of song; these Gears (ギア, Gia) manifest a personalized weapon called an Armed Gear (アームドギア, Āmudo Gia) and can assume multiple forms by overcoming system locks, with the strongest form, the X-Drive (エクスドライブ, Ekusu-Doraibu), requiring immense Phonic Gain and excess energy to activate. Users may also unleash a Superb Song (絶唱, Zesshō), (Note: A conjugation of zetsu (絶; 'to end') and shō (唱; 'performance/song')) a devastating attack that risks fatal backlash,; multiple users can combine their individual Superb Songs via S2CA (Superb Song Combination Arts) to create a more powerful version where the harmonization prevents backlash by either transmuting the excess power into usable energy for counterattacks or enhancing into X-Drive. Although each relic is typically restricted to Candidates with high link coefficiencies (適合係数, tekigō keisū) with the relic, some bypass this restriction via the experimental drug "Linker" (リンカ, Rinka) or by fusing with the relic.

Hibiki Tachibana (立花 響, Tachibana Hibiki)
Voiced by: Aoi Yūki
Hibiki Tachibana is the protagonist of the franchise. She is a clumsy schoolgirl with an positive attitude, fueled by her catchphrase "It's alright. Everything is just fine." (へいきへっちゃら, Heiki hecchara). At the start of the series, she survives a Noise attack at a Zwei Wing concert due to Kanade's sacrifice, which influences her to help others no matter the cost to herself. Two years later, when cornered by another Noise attack, she unconsciously activates a Symphogear by singing Kanade's song, empowered by a fragment of Kanade's relic embedded within her. In battle, she sometimes enters a frenzied state. Though initially wielding only a partial relic, she compensates with martial arts prowess, using piston-enhanced gauntlets to deliver powerful strikes. Her Symphogear, SG-r03' Gungnir (ガングニール, Gangunīru), later evolves after merging with energy from Maria's relic, granting her drill or jet-powered gauntlets. Exposure to the Shénshòujìng's laser removes the Curse of Balal from her, enabling her to harness divine power as a "God Slayer" (神殺し, Kami koroshi). Her battle songs are characterized by the violins, with aspects of Celtic rock.
Tsubasa Kazanari (風鳴 翼, Kazanari Tsubasa)
Voiced by: Nana Mizuki
Tsubasa Kazanari is a Symphogear Adaptor who fights the Noise using armor powered by song. She was once part of the idol duo Zwei Wing (ツヴァイウィング, Tsuvai Wingu), but after her partner Kanade sacrifices herself against the Noise, Tsubasa becomes cold and distant, refusing to accept Hibiki as a replacement at first. Despite being a popular idol, she initially rejects international performances, viewing herself solely as a weapon. In a battle against Chris Yukine, Tsubasa suffers a near-death experience from the recoil of her own Superb Song. While comatose, she converses with Kanade's memory, catalyzing a gradual process of self-reflection as she recovers from her injuries and opens up to others. Her Symphogear, SG-r01 Ame no Habakiri (天羽々斬), specializes in close combat, generating blades across her body. Her primary weapon is a katana, adjustable in size to match her opponent's strength. As the granddaughter and heir of Fudō Kazanari, she is biologically his daughter and half-sister to Yatsuhiro and Genjūrō Kazanari, tying her to the influential Kazanari family. Her songs feature traditional Japanese musical instruments mixed with elements of traditional J-Pop.
Chris Yukine (雪音 クリス, Yukine Kurisu)
Voiced by: Ayahi Takagaki
Chris Yukine is a half-Japanese Symphogear Adaptor initially working under Finé. She wields the stolen Nehushtan Armor (ネフシュタンの鎧, Nefushutan no Yoroi) and can summon Noise using "Solomon's Cane". Despite possessing a Symphogear, she refuses to sing due to past trauma. Eight years prior, her parents, Masanori Yukine (雪音 雅律, Yukine Masanori) and Sonnet M. Yukine (ソネット・M・ユキネ), used music to aid war refugees in South America before being killed in a terrorist attack. Chris was subsequently kidnapped and sold into slavery. After being rescued by the UN, she was taken in by Section Two—only to be abducted by Finé, who sought to exploit her abilities. When Finé abandons her for failing expectations, Chris allies with Hibiki and Tsubasa. Her initial hostility towards others evolves into fierce protectiveness over her teammates, especially Kirika and Shirabe, the younger members of Section Two. Her Symphogear, SG-r02 Ichaival (イチイバル), specializes in long-range combat, manifesting as a crossbow that shifts into firearms or missiles. Chris' battle songs involve elements of hard rock.
Maria Cadenzavna Eve (マリア・カデンツァヴナ・イヴ, Maria Kadentsavuna Ivu; Марія Кадензавна Єва)
Voiced by: Yōko Hikasa
First appearing in Symphogear G, Maria Cadenzavna Eve is a singer who rapidly achieved international fame after her debut. According to series co-creator Akifumi Kaneko, Maria and her sister Serena are Ukrainian. Along with Kirika and Shirabe, she initially fights Section Two while wielding an unauthorized Gungnir Symphogear featuring a spear-cannon hybrid weapon. Despite being led to believe she is Finé's reincarnation, this later proves false. Like Kanade, she requires Linker for synchronization, imposing battle time limits and making her Superb Song potentially lethal. After temporarily using Hibiki's Gungnir to protect their allies, she later adopts SG-x00 Airgetlam (アガートラーム, Agātorāmu), whose versatile whip-sword Armed Gear transforms between melee weapons and a Divine Weapon-crippling railgun. While initially seeing her emotional weakness as a fatal flaw, she grows to accept it as a source of personal strength by following Elfnein's example. Her battle songs have orchestral rock motifs with country rock influences.
Shirabe Tsukuyomi (月読 調, Tsukuyomi Shirabe)
Voiced by: Yoshino Nanjō
Shirabe Tsukuyomi is a Symphogear user introduced in Symphogear G who works with Maria and Kirika. Despite her quiet demeanor, she employs ruthless tactics and initially distrusts Hibiki, frequently criticizing her as a "hypocrite". During a confrontation with Kirika, she is revealed to be Finé's true vessel; Finé's soul later sacrifices herself to save Shirabe. She later redeems herself in GX, apologizing to Hibiki for her actions. Her backstory reveals she suffered amnesia from a car accident that killed her parents before being forced to join FIS. The name "Shirabe Tsukuyomi" was assigned based on recovered personal items. Her SG-i01 Shul Shagana (シュルシャガナ, Shuru Shagana) Symphogear specializes in high mobility, with disc blade Armed Gears stored throughout her body that can be launched as projectiles or used for rapid Noise elimination. Her electronic rock-influenced songs harmonize with Kirika in battle.
Kirika Akatsuki (暁 切歌, Akatsuki Kirika)
Voiced by: Ai Kayano
Kirika Akatsuki is a Symphogear user introduced in Symphogear G. As one of the "Receptor Children" raised in a research facility alongside Maria, Serena and Shirabe, she maintains a cheerful demeanor despite her traumatic past. Her strong bonds with comrades give her fearless determination in battle. Initially believed to be Finé's vessel after unconsciously using her powers, this is later disproven when Shirabe is revealed as the true host. This revelation leads to a tragic accident where her scythe Armed Gear fatally wounds Shirabe during a suicide attempt. Kirika's past remains largely unknown; like Shirabe, she lacks any memories of her family or origins. She frequently ends sentences with "Death" (デス, Desu) as a speech mannerism. Her SG-i02 Igalima (イガリマ, Igarima) Symphogear specializes in mass Noise combat, wielding a transforming scythe Armed Gear. She has excellent combat synergy with Shirabe, and has a symphonic rock motif for her battle songs.
Miku Kohinata (小日向 未来, Kohinata Miku)
Voiced by: Yuka Iguchi
Miku Kohinata is Hibiki's closest friend and dormmate. After discovering Hibiki's secret identity, she joins Section Two to support her. In Symphogear G, Dr. Ver corrupts her into wielding the relic SG-i03 Shénshòujìng (神獣鏡, Shenshōjin; lit. 'God Beast Mirror'), using its mirror Armed Gear to fire relic-negating lasers. Hibiki eventually frees her from this control. The AXZ epilogue reveals the Shénshòujìng's laser purged both girls from the Curse of Balal. This backfires in XV when Shem-Ha exploits this vulnerability to possess Miku, forcing Hibiki to rescue her again. In XD Unlimited, Miku voluntarily wields a parallel timeline's Shénshòujìng to aid allies in battle. Her dark wave techno motif reflects both her combat style and complex relationship with Hibiki.

=== Supporting characters ===
Kanade Amō (天羽 奏, Amō Kanade)
Voiced by: Minami Takayama
Kanade Amou was Tsubasa's partner in the vocal duo Zwei Wing. After losing her family to a Noise attack, she underwent experimental procedures to wield the SG-r03 Gungnir Symphogear, gaining a lance Armed Gear with full armor coverage. She sacrificed herself during a concert two years later, using her Superb Song to protect Hibiki while embedding a relic fragment in her body. She continues to support Tsubasa in her times of need through her spirit and Tsubasa's dreams. In XD Unlimited, a parallel timeline reveals an alternate outcome where Kanade survived instead of Tsubasa. With a fiery personality that complements Tsubasa's reserved demeanor, her musical motif is Japanese pop.
Genjūrō Kazanari (風鳴 弦十郎, Kazanari Genjūrō)
Voiced by: Hideo Ishikawa
The commander of Special Disaster Response Team Section Two, Genjūrō is Section Two's mentor figure and a fan of action movies. He is Tsubasa's uncle and her biological older half-brother. His physical strength is strong enough to deflect Tsubasa's Symphogear and her Armed Gear alone. After the first attack by Chris, he becomes Hibiki's teacher in martial arts at her request. He blames himself for his agents not being able to find Chris when she was kidnapped by Finé two years ago, but Genjūrō and Chris make up and she willingly cooperates with Tsubasa and Hibiki under Genjūrō's supervision only.
Ryōko Sakurai (櫻井 了子, Sakurai Ryōko)
Voiced by: Miyuki Sawashiro
Head scientist of Special Disaster Response Team Section Two and creator of the Symphogear. She has the ability to form powerful force-fields. She tends to sexually harass Hibiki and shows inappropriate interest in her. Her loyalties are somehow questionable, as she concerns herself more over the Symphogears and related relic experiments. Ryōko is revealed to be in actuality the main antagonist, Finé, who had possessed Ryōko's body and erased her consciousness long ago, for Finé's ultimate goal of using the power of Kadingir (Sumerian name of Babylon) to destroy the moon and exploit the subsequent chaos on Earth.
Shinji Ogawa (緒川 慎次, Ogawa Shinji)
Voiced by: Sōichirō Hoshi
Shinji is one of the agents of Special Disaster Response Team Section Two and Tsubasa's manager during her shows. He is an experienced veteran fighter, who can fight without having a gear. This allows him to help the girls in some parts, but his role is mostly supportive rather than taking direct combat.
Aoi Tomosato (友里 あおい, Tomosato Aoi)
Voiced by: Asami Seto
Aoi is a member of Special Disaster Response Team Section Two who is always in the underground part of the school.
Sakuya Fujitaka (藤尭 朔也, Fujitaka Sakuya)
Voiced by: Kenji Akabane
Sakuya is a member of Special Disaster Response Team Section Two who is always in the underground part of the school.
Serena Cadenzavna Eve (セレナ・カデンツァヴナ・イヴ, Serena Kadentsavuna Ivu)
Voiced by: Yui Horie
Maria's younger sister. Wanting to protect Maria and the other receptor children, she dies from a fatal performance of her Superb Song to disable the rampaging artifact Nephilim. An alternate timeline version of Serena appears in XD Unlimited, who in her reality took on more of Maria's role in the series as the circumstances of the two's respective survivals had been reversed. She wields the SG-x00 Airgetlam (アガートラーム, Agātorāmu), whose shortsword Armed Gear transforms into throwing knives. Serena shares her sister Maria's musical genre motif of Orchestral Rock, albeit with an added angelic-sounding church choir melody.
Nastassja Sergeyevna Tolstaya (ナスターシャ・セルゲイヴナ・トルスタヤ, Nasutāsha Serugeivuna Torusutaya; Настасья Сергеевна Толстая)
Voiced by: Kikuko Inoue
A heretical engineer introduced in Symphogear G, known as "Professor Nastassja" (ナスターシャ教授, Nasutāsha-kyouju) or "Mom" (マム, Mamu) by Maria's team. She serves as their technical advisor, possessing extensive classified knowledge about sacred relics beyond what was released after the Lunar Attack. Though genuinely caring for the team, she maintains strict discipline to prepare them for their missions. During the disaster that killed Serena, Nastassja saved Maria and was paralyzed from the waist down. Subsequently, she uses a wheelchair.
Elfnein (エルフナイン, Erufunain)
Voiced by: Misaki Kuno
Debuting in Symphogear GX. A girl from the world of alchemy who bears a resemblance to Carol. She comes before the other Symphogear users to provide them with a means of combating the Alca-Noise. From the end of GX onwards, she works with S.O.N.G as their mechanic.

=== Minor characters ===
Yumi Itaba (板場 弓美, Itaba Yumi)
Voiced by: Chinatsu Akasaki
Yumi is Hibiki and Miku's classmate. An anime lover, a running gag involves her proclaiming how life is similar to an anime.
Kuriyo Andō (安藤 創世, Andō Kuriyo)
Voiced by: Mikako Komatsu
Kuriyo is one of Hibiki and Miku's classmates and friends. Calls Hibiki, Miku, and Chris by the nicknames "Bikki", "Hina", and "Kinechri", respectively.
Shiori Terashima (寺島 詩織, Terashima Shiori)
Voiced by: Nao Tōyama
Shiori is one of Hibiki and Miku's classmates and friends. Calls her friends by their last names.
Komichi Ayano (綾野 小路, Ayano Komichi), Yuki Godai (五代 由貴, Godai Yuki), Otome Kaburagi (鏑木 乙女, Kaburagi Otome)
Voiced by: Akari Harashima, Mana Shimizu, and Harumi Sakurai
Debuting in Symphogear G, they are Chris' classmates who attempt to befriend her despite her attempts at avoiding them.
Ayumu Takasaka (高坂 歩, Takasaka Ayumu), Tōko Sabe (佐部 瞳子, Sabe Tōko), Ako Ōki (大木 杏胡, Ōki Ako)
Voiced by: Saori Ōnishi, Minami Takahashi, and Harumi Sakurai
Debuting in Symphogear G, they are Tsubasa's classmates.
Owner of Flower
Voiced by: Ai Orikasa
A woman who runs the okonomiyaki shop named "Flower", which Hibiki, Miku, and other classmates from Lydian visit frequently.
Tony Glazer (トニー・グレイザー, Tonī Gureizā)
Voiced by: Hidetoshi Nakamura (season 1), Masashi Ogawa (season 3)
Tony Glazer is the head of the music company "Metro Music", who supports Tsubasa and her music performances.
Taketsugu Hiroki (広木 威椎, Hiroki Taketsugu)
Voiced by: Yasunori Masutani
Hiroki is Minister of Defence who supports Special Disaster Response Team Section Two. He is assassinated by the American government on the order of Finé so that she, as Ryoko in disguise, can get a new Minister of Defence elected who will unintentionally further the construction of Kadingir, as Hiroki was against Finé's plans to do so.
Masahito Shibata (斯波田 賢仁, Shibata Masahito)
Voiced by: Hidekatsu Shibata
Debuting in Symphogear G, Shibata is Vice Minister of Foreign Affairs. He is often caught up in dealing with the complexities of current world affairs, but his main duty is to protect the Japanese government's national interest and the black art crystallized technology of the Symphogear system. Although Shibata is often seen as having a rude personality, he is the only man that understands Genjūrō, and is generally a person who cooperates with the Special Disaster Response Team Section Two's operations.
Akira Tachibana (立花 洸, Tachibana Akira)
Voiced by: Toshihiko Seki
Debuting in Symphogear GX, Akira is Hibiki's father who abandoned the family following the Zwei Wing concert tragedy. He reappears during Carol's attack to attempt to make amends with Hibiki and become part of the family again.
Yatsuhiro Kazanari (風鳴 八紘, Kazanari Yatsuhiro)
Voiced by: Kazuhiro Yamaji
Debuting in Symphogear GX, Yatsuhiro is Tsubasa's father and Genjūrō's brother. A government agent who carries out actions on the line between legal and illegal, he is the one who allowed Maria to transfer to SONG upon her request. Although Yatsuhiro treats his daughter, Tsubasa, coldly and calls her a "stained tool of the Kazanari clan", he cares about Tsubasa and only pushes her away in an attempt to allow her to follow her dreams as an idol. He dies in XV after shielding Tsubasa from a bullet fired by Fudō.
Fudō Kazanari (風鳴 訃堂, Kazanari Fudō)
Voiced by: Mugihito
Debuting in Symphogear AXZ, Fudō is Tsubasa's grandfather as well as the father of Genjūrō and Yatsuhiro. Wishing for a pure-blooded heir to the Kazanari clan, Fudō impregnated Yatsuhiro's wife to give birth to Tsubasa.
Sonia Virena (ソーニャ・ビレーナ, Sōnya Birēna)
Voiced by: Natsumi Fujiwara
Debuting in Symphogear AXZ, Sonia is woman from Val Verde who was a friend of Chris' parents, helping the Yukine family to realize their dream of bringing peace to the world with songs. Chris looked up to Sonia and thought of her as an older sister. However, due to Sonia's carelessness, terrorists were able to sneak a bomb into the camp the Yukine family resided in, killing both Chris' parents. Chris and Sonia were separated in the confusion. However, after Sonia eventually survived harm, Chris was captured by the terrorists and sold into slavery. Chris and Sonia meet again nine years later when SONG intervenes in Val Verde due to reports of Alca-Noise.
Stephan Virena (ステファン・ビレーナ, Sutefan Birēna)
Voiced by: Asuna Tomari
Debuting in Symphogear AXZ, Stephan is Sonia's little brother who played soccer. Stephan and his village were enslaved, but after he is rescued by Hibiki during a conflict with the Alca-Noise, he request the help of Hibiki, Tsubasa, and Chris to rescue his village. However, Stephan's leg is grabbed by an Alca-Noise, and Chris is forced to shoot it off to stop Stephan from disintegrating entirely.

=== Antagonists ===
Finé (フィーネ, Fīne)
Voiced by: Miyuki Sawashiro
Finé is an immortal priestess whose consciousness reincarnates through descendants. She orchestrates attacks to acquire relics and weaponize Hibiki's Gungnir fusion, having caused the Zwei Wing incident and stolen the Nehushtan Armor.
John Wayne Vercingetorix (ジョン・ウェイン・ウェルキンゲトリクス, Jon Wein Uerukingetorikusu)
Voiced by: Tomokazu Sugita
Dr. John Wayne Vercingetorix, commonly called Dr. Ver (ウェル博士, Weru-hakase), is a rogue researcher introduced in Symphogear G. A brilliant but unstable biochemist specializing in relic-human fusion, he develops enhanced Linker drugs while exhibiting erratic behavior.
His surname was named after the legendary Gaul chieftain who led a failed anti-Roman uprising, Vercingetorix.
Carol Malus Dienheim (キャロル・マールス・ディーンハイム, Kyaroru Mārusu Dīnhaimu)
Voiced by: Inori Minase
Carol Malus Dienheim is an alchemist introduced in Symphogear GX seeking to destroy the world to avenge her father's death. She was designed by series co-creator Kaneko as a foil to Hibiki. Both Carol and Hibiki experienced similar tragedies in their past, but Carol was left orphaned without any friends to rely on. She can transform into an adult form by sacrificing memories and commands powerful relics.
Phara Suyuf (ファラ・スユーフ, Fara Suyūfu)
Voiced by: Masumi Tazawa
Debuting in Symphogear GX, Phara is of the four Autoscorers Carol has under her command. She has incredible flexibility and wields swords.
Leiur Darahim (レイア・ダラーヒム, Reia Darāhimu)
Voiced by: Shizuka Ishigami
Debuting in Symphogear GX, Leiur is an Autoscorer who uses coins to perform high speed projectile attacks. She also has a "little sister" Autoscorer who is capable of incredible destruction.
Garie Tuman (ガリィ・トゥーマーン, Garyi Tūmān)
Voiced by: Michiyo Murase
Debuting in Symphogear GX, Garie is an Autoscorer who can manipulate water to create illusions or form ice attacks.
Micha Jawkan (ミカ・ジャウカーン, Mika Jaukān)
Voiced by: Shiori Izawa
Debuting in Symphogear GX, Micha is a combat-type Autoscorer who has a violent and psychotic personality, possessing claws and rocket-powered hair.
Saint-Germain (サンジェルマン, San-Jeruman)
Voiced by: Minako Kotobuki
Saint-Germain is an immortal alchemist introduced in Symphogear AXZ as a leader of the Bavarian Illuminati. Having perfected her body through alchemy, she seeks divine power to liberate humanity from oppression. Her mother was a sex slave who died of illness after being abandoned by Saint-Germain's father. In the climax, she and her allies sacrifice themselves by transforming a nuclear missile into Divine Power through alchemical purification, dissolving their physical forms in the process. She returns in XV as a spirit who aids Hibiki in the battle against Noble Red.
Cagliostro (カリオストロ, Kariosutoro)
Voiced by: Shōta Aoi
Debuting in Symphogear AXZ, Cagliostro is an alchemist from the Bavarian Illuminati. She used to be a man who was a swindler known for his endless lies, before being granted a perfect body by Saint-Germain.
Prelati (プレラーティ, Purerāti)
Voiced by: Rina Hidaka
Debuting in Symphogear AXZ, Prelati is an alchemist from the Bavarian Illuminati. She used to be a man who indulged in luxury and pleasure, before being granted a perfect body by Saint-Germain, following his defeat at her hands. Prelati has since sworn to become an earnest researcher, but sometimes lets her preference for fun get in the way of her work.
Tiki (ティキ)
Voiced by: Hina Kino
Debuting in Symphogear AXZ, Tiki is an Autoscorer from the Bavarian Illuminati. She was created by Adam to observe the motions of the planets and record them as star maps.
Adam Weishaupt (アダム・ヴァイスハウプト, Adamu Vaisuhauputo)
Voiced by: Shinichiro Miki
Debuting in Symphogear AXZ, Adam is a alchemist who is the founder of the Bavarian Illuminati. He is destroyed when Hibiki uses the power of Chrysopoeia, with the help of the spirits of the alchemists.
Vanessa Diodati (ヴァネッサ・ディオダティ, Vanessa Diodati)
Voiced by: Mao Ichimichi
Debuting in Symphogear XV, Vanessa is the leader of the Bavarian Illuminati remnants known as Noble Red after Adam's death in AXZ.
Millaarc Cranstoun (ミラアルク・クランシュトウン, Miraaruku Kuranshuton)
Voiced by: Aimi
Debuting in Symphogear XV, Millaarc is a failed experiment by the Bavarian Illuminati to produce a vampire of legend.
Elsa Bête (エルザ・ベート, Eruza Bēto)
Voiced by: Kana Ichinose
Debuting in Symphogear XV, Elsa was an experimental subject of the Bavarian Illuminati implanted with bestial DNA.
Shem-Ha Mephorash (シェム・ハ・メフォラス, Shemu Ha Meforasu)
Voiced by: Noriko Hidaka
Debuting in Symphogear XV, Shem-Ha Mephorash was awakened from her slumber by Fudo Kazanari and Noble Red, and reborn into the body of Miku Kohinata.

== Media ==
On November 20, 2022, it was announced at the end of the "Symphogear Live 2020→2022" concert that a new project in the Symphogear franchise was being developed and would be released at an unannounced date.

=== Manga ===
A manga series illustrated by Dan Yoshii was serialized in Kadokawa Shoten's Newtype Ace magazine from December 10, 2011, to March 9, 2013. Its chapters were collected in three tankōbon volumes, released from May 10, 2012, to July 10, 2013.

A spin-off manga by Tsutanoha, titled Senki Kanshoku Symphogear: Shirabe Meshi (戦姫完食シンフォギア〜調めし〜; lit. 'Feast of the Valkyries: Symphogear – Cooking with Shirabe'), began serialization in Takeshobo's Storia Dash website on June 11, 2021. The series is set in an alternate universe where the characters who died during the events of the main series have come back to life. Its chapters have been collected into individual tankōbon volumes, with the first one released on March 30, 2022. As of December 17, 2025, seven volumes have been released.

=== Anime ===
The anime, produced by Satelight and Encourage Films, began airing in Japan on Tokyo MX between January 6, 2012, and March 30, 2012. Nico Nico simulcast the series in Japan. The opening theme was "Synchrogazer" performed by Nana Mizuki, and the ending theme was "Meteor Light" performed by Ayahi Takagaki, with multiple character and insert songs performed by Aoi Yūki, Nana Mizuki, Ayahi Takagaki, Minami Takayama, and Yuka Iguchi used throughout the season. Discotek Media released this season on subtitled Blu-ray Disc in North America on October 27, 2020.

On September 5, 2012, Thomas Romain – an animator on the series – wrote on Twitter "for the ones who liked Symphogear, there will be good news soon!", later revealing on October 6, 2012, that production on a second season has begun. The second season, titled Senki Zesshō Symphogear G, aired between July 4 and September 26, 2013. The opening theme for the second season was "Vitalization" performed by Nana Mizuki, and the ending theme was "Next Destination" performed by Ayahi Takagaki, with multiple new character and insert songs performed by Aoi Yūki, Nana Mizuki, Ayahi Takagaki, Yōko Hikasa, Yoshino Nanjō, Ai Kayano, and Yuka Iguchi used throughout the season. Discotek Media released this season on subtitled Blu-ray Disc in North America on January 26, 2021.

A third season, titled Senki Zessho Symphogear GX, aired in Japan between July 4, 2015, and September 25, 2015, and was simulcast by Chernin-owned Crunchyroll. Crunchyroll also began streaming the first season on September 2, 2015, followed by Symphogear G on September 18 of that same year.

The fourth and fifth seasons were announced on February 28, 2016, at the Symphogear Live 2016 event in Japan. The former, titled Symphogear AXZ (pronounced "axis"), began airing between July 1, 2017, and September 30, 2017.

The fifth and final season, titled Symphogear XV, was originally scheduled to premiere in April 2019, but the air-date was pushed back to July 2019 in order to further refine the anime before its release. The fifth season aired between July 6, 2019, and September 28, 2019. Its opening theme is "Metanoia" performed by Nana Mizuki while the ending theme is "Lasting Song" performed by Ayahi Takagaki. Medialink licensed the fifth and final season in South and Southeast Asia and streamed the anime in their YouTube channel.

=== Video games ===
Characters from Symphogear appear in Super Heroine Chronicle, a role-playing game developed by Bandai Namco Entertainment for PlayStation 3 and PlayStation Vita and released in Japan on February 6, 2014.

A smartphone game developed by Bushiroad, titled Symphogear XD Unlimited, was released in Japan on June 26, 2017. An English version of the smartphone game was released by Pokelabo on February 14, 2020. However, due to mismanagement and lack of a large playerbase needed to maintain the game in the long run, the English version was shut down on July 31 of the same year, with all information about it purged from all official sites. The Japanese version of the game ended service on January 31, 2024.

== Reception ==
=== Critical response ===
The first season of Symphogear received generally positive reviews from critics, who praised its delivery of extravagant battle scenes and melodrama, but objected to the lack of originality in the narrative. While recognizing shortcomings in the production value of the original season, Ryan Thomson of SakugaBlog showed a steady increase in animation quality across subsequent seasons, stemming in the "conceptually exciting" and well-executed action sequences of Symphogear XV.

=== Awards ===
In the 2019 Anime UK News Readers' Choice Awards, Symphogear XV won the category for Best TV Anime. Symphogear won the category for "Most Wanted Anime License", and was runner-up for the category of "Most Wanted Manga License". Hibiki and Miku were runner-up for the category of "Best Couple".
