= Junpei Fujita =

Junpei Fujita 藤田 淳平
- Genres: Anison, electronica
- Occupations: Composer, arranger, sound producer
- Instrument: Piano
- Spouse: Akiko Tatsumi (m. 2009)

Junpei Fujita (藤田 淳平, Fujita Junpei) is a Japanese arranger and composer, and a founding member of Elements Garden. His work includes composition and arrangement of some tracks of singles and albums of Nana Mizuki including albums Hybrid Universe, Ultimate Diamond and Impact Exciter and singles "Wild Eyes", "Super Generation", "Junketsu Paradox", "Mugen" and Starcamp EP. He also composed music for a track on Mamoru Miyano album Wonder and Mamoru Miyano single Refrain. Along with other members of Elements Garden, he also worked on the soundtrack of the game Wild Arms XF, and composed and arranged music for the game G Senjō no Maō and franchise BanG Dream!. He also arranged music from the PC version of the visual novel Akaneiro ni Somaru Saka. He married singer Suara in 2009.

== Filmography ==
=== Anime ===
List of production work in anime
Year	Title	Crew role	Notes	Source
2007	Mushi-Uta	Music		
2008	H2O: Footprints in the Sand	Music		
2009	White Album series	Music		
2010	B Gata H Kei	Music		
2012	Bodacious Space Pirates	Music		
2012	Ixion Saga DT	Music		
2013	Uta no Prince-sama series	Music		
2014	Bodacious Space Pirates: Abyss of Hyperspace	Music	As Elements Garden	
2014	The Fruit of Grisaia	Music		
2014	When Supernatural Battles Became Commonplace	Composer, Arranger for theme songs		
2015	Dance with Devils	Music		
2025	BanG Dream! Ave Mujica	Music		
	Symphogear series	Music		
	Rokka: Braves of the Six Flowers	Music		

=== Video games ===
List of production work in video games
Year	Title	Crew role	Notes	Source
	Shining Resonance	Music		
	Shining Blade	Music		
	Little Battlers Experience	Music		
	Suikoden Tierkreis	Music		
	Wild Arms XF	Music Composers		
	Tokyo Xtreme Racer 3	Music		
