= Elements Garden =

Japanese group of music composers

Elements Garden is a Japanese group of music composers, or a "music production brand" as they call themselves. They generally produce music for video games, anime and recording artists. They are attached to Aria Entertainment.

The group was formed in 2004 by Noriyasu Agematsu, Junpei Fujita, Hitoshi Fujima and Daisuke Kikuta, former members of Feel, a band of composers that similarly composed music for games and anime that disbanded shortly after Elements Garden's formation. Agematsu acts as the lead representative for the group.

Elements Garden released their eponymous first album in August 2008, a compilation of various game theme songs produced over the past years. A second album, Tone Cluster, was released the following year in September. Both albums were released under King Records.

== Members ==
=== Current members ===
- Noriyasu Agematsu (上松範康) – founding member - leader
- Junpei Fujita (藤田淳平) – founding member
- Hitoshi Fujima (藤間仁) – founding member
- Daisuke Kikuta (菊田大介) – founding member
- Seima Iwahashi (岩橋星実) – joined in 2011
- Ryutaro Fujinaga (藤永龍太郎) – joined in 2014
- Asuka Oda (織田あすか) - joined in 2015
- Ryota Tomaru (都丸椋太) – joined in 2015
- Yuta Kasai (笠井雄太) – joined in 2016
- Yusuke Takeda (竹田祐介) – joined in 2017
- Kotaro Shimoda (下田晃太郎) - joined in 2019
- Seima Kondo (近藤世真) - joined in 2020
- Yuki Hidaka (日高勇輝) – joined in 2020

=== Former members ===
- Masato Nakayama (中山真斗) – joined in 2007; left in 2013
- Haruki Mori (母里治樹) – joined in 2009; left in 2018
- Tomohiro Kita (喜多智弘) – joined in 2011; left in 2016
- Evan Call – joined in 2012; left in 2016
- Ryota Suemasu (末益涼太) – joined in 2014; left in 2019

== Discography ==
- Elements Garden (Released August 6, 2008)

No.	Title	Writer(s)	Vocal	Length
1.	"Introduction"	written by Elements Garden		1:44
2.	"SALVAGE REQUIEM"	written by Elements Garden	Yui Sakakibara	4:48
3.	"Wing of Destiny" (Galaxy Angel II: Zettai Ryōiki no Tobira OP ~M side~)	written by Noriyasu Agematsu	Maho Tomita	4:45
4.	"KAMUY" (Yatohime Zankikou OP)	written by Noriyasu Agematsu arranged by Junpei Fujita	Mokuren	4:32
5.	"dissonant chord" (Princess Waltz OP)	lyrics by kanoko composed by Noriyasu Agematsu	NANA	4:03
6.	"Happy Leap" (Time Leap OP)	lyrics by Bee' composed by Noriyasu Agematsu	Yui Sakakibara	3:25
7.	"Tsunagaru☆Love Mix (ツナガル☆らぶみくす)" (Tsunaban♥Love Mix OP)	lyrics by Hiromi Sato composed by Hitoshi Fujima	Mico Yada	3:45
8.	"120-en no Haru (120円の春)" (120-en no Haru: ¥120 Stories theme song)	lyrics by Tomo Kataoka composed by Hitoshi Fujima	YURIA	5:24
9.	"ZERO" (Happiness! OP)	lyrics by kanoko composed by Daisuke Kikuta	Hiromi Sato	3:57
10.	"Never Slash!!" (Gakuto! OP)	lyrics by kanoko composed by Junpei Fujita	Faylan	3:45
11.	"Growth of mind" (Twinkle Crusaders 2nd theme song)	lyrics by Rie Miyauchi composed by Daisuke Kikuta	Yui Sakakibara & NANA	4:56
12.	"Answer" (G Senjō no Maō OP)	lyrics by kanoko composed by Junpei Fujita	Rekka Katakiri	3:43
13.	"CRISIS BEAT" (Otome Crisis OP)	lyrics by ayachi composed by Daisuke Kikuta	Rita	3:59
14.	"Reconquista" (Reconquista OP)	lyrics by Hajime Unatomi composed by Noriyasu Agematsu arranged by Daisuke Kikuta	Faylan	4:26
15.	"Tamayura (魂響)" (Tamayura (PC) OP)	written by Noriyasu Agematsu arranged by Junpei Fujita	Rekka Katakiri	4:35
16.	"Yume no Tsuki (夢の月)" (Quilt ~Anata to Tsumugu Yume to Koi no Dress~ OP)	lyrics by kanoko composed by Hitoshi Fujima	KAKO	3:45

- Elements Garden II -TONE CLUSTER- (Released September 2, 2009)

No.	Title	Writer(s)	Vocal	Length
1.	"Introduction"	written by Elements Garden		0:49
2.	"Deus Ex Machina"	written by Elements Garden	Hironobu Kageyama	3:51
3.	"Tazunebito (尋ねビト)" (Hoshiuta OP)	lyrics by Bee' composed by Hitoshi Fujima	Veil ∞ Lia	4:43
4.	"Hoshi☆ni Negai wo (星☆に願いを)" (Onegai Ohoshisama OP)	written by Noriyasu Agematsu	NANA	3:49
5.	"ENGAGE LINKS" (Engage Links OP)	lyrics by ayachi composed by Junpei Fujita arranged by Masato Nakayama	Marie	4:21
6.	"Arcadia Parade (アルカディア・パレード)" (Himesama, Oteyawaraka ni! opening theme)	lyrics by Rekka Katakiri composed by Junpei Fujita	Rekka Katakiri	3:35
7.	"Try on!" (Te to Te Try On! OP)	lyrics by Toyama Ken & kanoko composed by Noriyasu Agematsu arranged by Daisuke Kikuta	NANA	4:43
8.	"Tears in snow" (True Tears OP)	lyrics by tororo composed by Noriyasu Agematsu	Hiromi Sato	5:10
9.	"Chou Shinsei -Supernova- (超新生-スーパーノヴァ-)" (Dengeki Daioh image song)	lyrics by Daioh SP composed by Noriyasu Agematsu arranged by Daisuke Kikuta	Chiaki Takahashi	3:57
10.	"Flare☆Complex (ふれあ☆こんぷれっくす)" (Fuwari Complex OP)	lyrics by ayachi composed by Masato Nakayama	NANA	3:34
11.	"Garnet Cradle (ガーネット・クレイドル)" (Garnet Cradle OP)	lyrics by Yuma Katagiri composed by Junpei Fujita	Hiroki Nagase	3:33
12.	"Border -Kyoukai- (Border -境界-)" (Scarlett ~Nichijou no Kyoukaisen~ theme song)	lyrics by Hajime Unatomi composed by Hitoshi Fujima	Mico Yada	4:24
13.	"Silent Snow" (Sentinel OP)	lyrics by kanoko composed by Junpei Fujita	Rita	4:18
14.	"Amber World (アンバーワールド)" (Amber Quartz OP)	lyrics by Hiromi Sato composed by Hitoshi Fujima	Hiromi Sato	3:35
15.	"STAR LEGEND" (77 ~And, two stars meet again~ OP)	lyrics by Bee' composed by Noriyasu Agematsu arranged by Masato Nakayama	Yui Sakakibara	4:52
16.	"Shukufuku no Campanella (祝福のカンパネラ)" (Shukufuku no Campanella OP)	lyrics by Hiromi Sato composed Noriyasu Agematsu arranged by Daisuke Kikuta	Hiromi Sato & NANA	5:13

- Elements Garden III -phenomena- (Released September 22, 2010)

No.	Title	Writer(s)	Vocal	Length
1.	"introduction"	written by Elements Garden		1:03
2.	"PLEASE KILL OUR MUSIC"	written by Elements Garden	Kisho Taniyama	3:58
3.	"Crimson Star" (Growlancer (PSP) OP)	lyrics by Bee' composed by Noriyasu Agematsu	Maho Tomita	3:59
4.	"1/6000000000" (Rosario + Vampire: Koi to Yume no Rhapsodia OP)	lyrics by RUCCA composed by Daisuke Kikuta	Ran, Rin & Ren Otonashi (CV: Megumi Takamoto)	5:02
5.	"Believe forever" (Suzukaze no Melt -Where wishes are drawn to each other- OP)	lyrics by Bee' composed by Noriyasu Agematsu arranged by Masato Nakayama	Hiromi Sato	4:24
6.	"pile up HURRICANE!" (Sakaagari Hurricane OP)	lyrics by ayachi composed by Junpei Fujita	Haruna Nakagawa	4:13
7.	"Iro ni Idenikeri Waga Koi wa (色に出でにけりわが恋は)" (Iro ni Ide ni Keri Waga Koi wa OP)	lyrics by ayachi composed by Daisuke Kikuta	Rekka Katakiri	4:57
8.	"Tasogarezora (たそがれ空)" (Hoshiuta Starlight Serenade ED)	lyrics by Bee' composed by Hitoshi Fujima	Chata	5:15
9.	"Rocket Love Panic! (ロケットラブパニック！)" (Osananajimi wa Daitouryou OP)	written by Masato Nakayama	Marie	3:46
10.	"Sakura Philosophy (さくらフィロソフィー)" (Sakura Tale OP)	lyrics by Masato Nakayama composed by Junpei Fujita	Yui Sakakibara	4:23
11.	"Hatsukoi carnival (初恋carnival)" (Sugar Coat Freaks OP)	lyrics by RUCCA composed by Junpei Fujita	Megu Sakuragawa	3:49
12.	"Harukaze (春風)" (Sanarara ED)	lyrics by Hajime Unatomi composed by Hitoshi Fujima	KAKO	4:37
13.	"Mercuria (メルクリア)" (Mercuria ~Mizu no Miyako ni Koi no Hanataba o~ OP2)	lyrics by RUCCA composed by Masato Nakayama	Haruka Shimotsuki	4:48
14.	"Hakuou Kouro -Sono Yukusaki- (白鷗行路-その行く先-)" (Oujou Ibun Daiichimon -Kare ga Shinanakereba Ikenakatta Riyuu- OP)	lyrics by ayachi composed by Hitoshi Fujima	NANA	4:24
15.	"Live in Despair" (Coμ -Kuroi Ryuu to Yasashii Oukoku IN)	lyrics by Bee' composed by Noriyasu Agematsu arranged by Daisuke Kikuta	Faylan	6:00
16.	"Takaramono (たからもの)" (Shukufuku no Campanella ED)	lyrics by Hiromi Sato composed by Daisuke Kikuta	Mico Yada	4:11

== Artists Elements Garden has composed for ==
- Ai Kayano
- Aoi Yūki
- Asaka
- ASCA
- Ayahi Takagaki
- Aina Aiba
- BanG Dream!
  - Afterglow
  - Hello, Happy World!
  - Morfonica
  - MyGO!!!!!
  - Pastel＊Palettes
  - Poppin'Party
  - Raise A Suilen
  - Roselia
  - Ave Mujica
- Chiai Fujikawa
- Choucho
- D4DJ
  - Peaky P-key
- Daisuke Ono
- ELISA
- Emi Nitta
- Faylan
- Ghost Concert
- Haruka Shimotsuki
- HIMEKA
- Hiromi Satō
- Hironobu Kageyama
- Inori Minase
- JAM Project
- KAKO
- Kaori Oda
- Kazco
- Kinki Kids
- KIRIKO
- kozue
- Lia
- Love Live!
- Maho Tomita
- MAKO
- Mamoru Miyano
- Maneki Kecak
- Maon Kurosaki
- Marie
- Marina Kawano
- Masaaki Endoh
- Mashiro Ayano
- Megu Sakuragawa
- Michi
- Mico Yada
- Mika Agematsu
- miko
- Mikoi Sasaki
- Minako Kotobuki
- Minami
- Minami Kuribayashi
- Minori Chihara
- Miyuki Hashimoto
- Mokuren
- Nagi Yanagi
- NANA
- Nana Mizuki
- Princession Orchestra
- Rekka Katakiri
- Rina Hidaka
- Riryka
- Rita
- savage genius
- Sayaka Sasaki
- Shouta Aoi
- Sphere
- ST☆RISH
- Starnova
- Suara
- Symphogear
- Takanori Nishikawa
- Takuma Terashima
- Technoroid
- The Idolmaster Million Live!
- Triad Primus
- Visual Prison
- Wataru Hatano
- Yōko Hikasa
- Yoshino Nanjo
- yozuca*
- Yui Horie
- Yui Sakakibara
- YuiKaori
- YURIA
