= Broccoli (company) =

Japanese media company

BROCCOLI Co., Ltd.
- Native name: 株式会社ブロッコリー
- Romanized name: Kabushiki-gaisha Burokkorī
- Type: Subsidiary
- Industry: Anime; Manga; Video games
- Founded: March 25, 1994; 32 years ago
- Headquarters: Toyotamakita, Nerima, Tokyo, Japan
- Parent: Happinet (2023–present)
- Subsidiaries: Broccoli Books
- Website: https://www.broccoli.co.jp

Broccoli Co., Ltd. (Japanese: 株式会社ブロッコリー, Hepburn: Kabushiki-gaisha Burokkorī) is a Japanese media company that publishes manga, anime, video games and trading card games. It operated a chain of retailers in Japan called Gamers which carries similar products and accessories. Broccoli is best known for the franchises, Di Gi Charat, Galaxy Angel, Aquarian Age, and Uta no Prince-sama.

== History ==
Satsuki Yamashita, the editor of Broccoli Books, explained that the company derived its president's desire to create a memorable name similar to that of Apple Inc. While trying to imagine of another fruit or vegetable, he arrived at broccoli. This coincidentally has the same name in nearly every language.

On January 23, 2008, Broccoli announced it would be collaborating with leading industry retailer Animate to form a new company called "AniBro". Broccoli holds a minority 30% ownership of the company, which is managed by the CEO of Animate.

On March 30, 2011, Broccoli announced that it would sell its retail operations, including Gamers, to Animate for about 250 million yen.

On October 14, 2022, Broccoli announced it would be collaborating with TIS Creation to establish a new game brand named LicoBiTs with a focus on otome games. The first otome game developed under LicoBiTs, Utakata no Uchronia, was released on April 11, 2024.

On April 14, 2023, Happinet has announced that the company is aiming to make Broccoli a fully owned subsidiary through a friendly takeover bid. The deal was finalized on June 13 that same year.

== Former subsidiaries ==
=== Gamers ===
Broccoli previously owned a chain of retail stores, Gamers, which distributes anime, manga, audio dramas, anime music CDs, figurines, snacks, stationery, apparel, posters, calendars, trading cards and accessories such as cell phone straps and keychains. Headquartered at the Akihabara location in Tokyo, the store has locations throughout Japan. The first Gamers opened in Ikebukuro, a district of Tokyo, Japan in July 1996, and which closed its doors on January 15, 2006. Broccoli opened a store in Los Angeles, California, Anime Gamers USA, that also acted as the main distributor of Broccoli Book's releases in the United States. On November 20, 2008, Broccoli announced that they would be withdrawing from the US market and closed down shop, shortly afterward. Gamers was eventually sold to rival, Animate.

=== Broccoli Books ===
Broccoli Books was a subsidiary that published manga in North America. It had a boys love imprint, Boysenberry Books, that launched in 2007. It ceased operations in December 2008 and all the titles reverted to the Japanese holders.

=== Synch-Point ===
The Synch-Point division produced English-language versions of anime and manga for North American distribution. Originally started as the anime division for Digital Manga in 2001, they were split off and acquired by Broccoli in 2002. They went on a hiatus in March 2005, before shutting down in 2008. The company was known for incomplete English dubs, with the exception of FLCL which has since been subsequently re-licensed to Funimation, while the follow-up seasons, Progressive, Alternative, Grunge and Shoegaze were licensed by Warner Bros.
