= Harmony (disambiguation) =

Harmony is the concept in music of combining different sounds to create new, distinct musical ideas.

Harmony, harmonious or harmonie may also refer to:

== Arts and entertainment ==
=== Film and television ===
- Harmony (2010 film), a South Korean film
- Harmony (2015 film), a Japanese anime film based on the novel by Project Itoh
- Harmony (2018 film), an Australian fantasy thriller film
- "Harmony" (Haven), a 2009 TV episode
- "Harmony" (The Prisoner), a 2008 TV episode
- "Harmony" (Stargate Atlantis), a 2008 TV episode
- Harmony, the fictional setting for the soap opera Passions

=== Linguistics ===
- Harmony (phonology), a feature of spoken language

=== Literature ===
- Harmony (Schenker), a 1906 book on music theory by Heinrich Schenker
- Harmony: A New Way of Looking at Our World, a 2010 book by Charles, Prince of Wales, with Tony Juniper and Ian Skelly
- Harmony, a 2010 novel by Project Itoh

=== Music ===
==== Styles ====
- Harmonie, ensemble of wind instruments during the Classical era

==== Groups ====
- Harmony (Swedish band), a Christian metal band

==== Albums ====
- Harmony (Anne Murray album) or the title song, 1987
- Harmony (Bill Frisell album), 2019
- Harmony (Cacophony album), 2018
- Harmony (Don Williams album), 1976
- Harmony (Gordon Lightfoot album) or the title song, 2004
- Harmony (John Conlee album), or the title song, 1986
- Harmony (Josh Groban album), 2020
- Harmony (Londonbeat album) or the title song, 1992
- Harmony (Never Shout Never album) or the title song, 2010
- Harmony (The Priests album), 2009
- Harmony (Sa Dingding album), 2010
- Harmony (Serena Ryder album), 2012
- Harmony (Three Dog Night album), 1971
- Harmony (The Wake album), 1982
- Harmony (Brutalismus 3000 album), 2026
- Harmony, a 1996 EP by Papa Lips

==== Songs ====
- "Harmony" (Beni Arashiro song), 2004
- "Harmony" (Elton John song), 1974
- "Harmony" (John Conlee song), 1986
- "Harmony" (Suzi Lane song), 1979
- "Harmony", by Artie Kaplan, 1972
- "Harmony", by the Avalanches from Wildflower, 2016
- "Harmony", by Blonde Redhead from La Mia Vita Violenta, 1995
- "Harmony", by Clinic from Walking with Thee, 2002
- "Harmony", by Happy Mondays from Pills 'n' Thrills and Bellyaches, 1990
- "Harmony", by Kylie Minogue, a B-side of "In Your Eyes", 2002
- "Harmony", by Shouta Aoi, 2019
- "Harmony", by Sly & the Family Stone from Life, 1968
- "Harmony", by Starflyer 59 from Americana, 1997
- "Harmony", by Barry Manilow from Scores (album), 2004
- "Harmony", written by Michael Lloyd, from the Kidsongs video A Day with the Animals

==== Other works ====
- Harmony (musical), with music by Barry Manilow

=== Other uses in arts and entertainment ===
- The Game of Harmony, a 1990 video game
- Harmony: The Fall of Reverie, a 2023 video game
- Harmonious (Epcot), a nighttime show at Walt Disney World Resort, Florida

== Businesses and organizations ==
=== Businesses ===
- Harmony Airways, a former Canadian airline
- Harmony Books, an imprint of Crown Publishing Group, part of Penguin Random House
- Harmony Company, a former American guitar manufacturer
- Harmony Records, a record label active founded 1925

=== Politics ===
- Social Democratic Party "Harmony", a Latvian political party
  - National Harmony Party, a former Latvian political party dissolved in 2010 to create the former
  - Harmony Centre, a former Latvian political alliance
- Harmonious Society, a socioeconomic concept in China

=== Other organizations ===
- Harmony (organization), supporting LGBTQ+ members of Community of Christ
- Harmony, Incorporated, an international organization of women singers
- Harmony Public Schools, a charter-school management organization in Texas, US
- Harmony Society, a German-American religious group c. 1805 to 1905

== Places ==
=== Antarctica ===
- Harmony Point and Harmony Cove, South Shetland Islands

=== Canada ===
- Harmony, Alberta
- Harmony, Nova Scotia
- Harmony, Ontario (disambiguation)
- Harmony River, Ontario

=== United States ===
- Harmony, Arkansas
- Harmony, California
- Harmony, Florida
- Harmony, Jefferson County, Illinois
- Harmony, McHenry County, Illinois
- Harmony, Indiana
- Harmony, Maine
- Harmony, Maryland
- Harmony, Minnesota
- Harmony, New Jersey (disambiguation)
- Harmony, New York
- Harmony, North Carolina
- Harmony, Ohio
- Harmony, Oklahoma
- Harmony, Pennsylvania
  - Harmony Historic District, Harmonists' first settlement in America
- Harmony, Rhode Island
- Harmony, Texas
- Harmony, Washington
- Harmony, West Virginia
- Harmony, Marinette County, Wisconsin
- Harmony, Price County, Wisconsin
- Harmony, Rock County, Wisconsin
- Harmony, Vernon County, Wisconsin
- Harmony, Wyoming

== Science and technology ==
=== Computing ===
- Harmony (operating system), an experimental computer operating system
- Harmony (toolkit), a software widget toolkit
- HarmonyOS, a distributed operating system by Huawei
- Harmony search, an evolutionary algorithm used in optimization problems
- Harmony technology, by RealNetworks
- Apache Harmony, a Java open source implementation
- ECMAScript Harmony, 6th edition of the scripting language
- Logitech Harmony, a series of universal remote controls
- Project Harmony (licensing), a Canonical initiative about contributor agreements for Open Source software
- Toon Boom Harmony, animation software

=== Space ===
- Harmony (ISS module), a segment of the International Space Station
- Harmony (satellite), a mission of the European Space Agency

== Other uses ==
- Harmony (name), including a list of people and fictional characters with the given name and surname
- Harmony (color), the property of certain aesthetically pleasing color combinations
- Harmony (ship), the name of several ships

== See also ==
- Harmoni (disambiguation)
- Harmonia (disambiguation)
- Harmonic (disambiguation)
- Harmony Day, an observance in Australia
- Harmony Garden (disambiguation)
- Harmony School (disambiguation)
- Harmony Township (disambiguation)
- New Harmony (disambiguation)
- Peace, a state of harmony in the absence of hostility and violence
- Consonant harmony, in linguistics
  - Vowel harmony, in linguistics
- Logical harmony, a property of rules of inference within a system of logic
