= Harmonizers =

Harmonizers or harmonizer may refer to:

- Harmonizer, a type of pitch shifter

== Music ==
- Harmonize (musician)
- Harmonizers, a nickname for fans of Fifth Harmony, an American girl group; see List of fandom names
- The Harmonizer, the official publication of the Barbershop Harmony Society

== A cappella groups ==
- Alexandria Harmonizers, a choir from Alexandria, Virginia, United States
- The Four Harmonizers, a barbershop quartet from Chicago, Illinois, United States
- Homestead Harmonizers, a barbershop choir from Beatrice, Nebraska, United States
- The Spiritual Harmonizers, a gospel group from Richmond, Virginia, United States

== Albums ==
- Harmonizer (Apoptygma Berzerk album), 2002
- Harmonizer (Ty Segall album), 2021
- I'll Sing You a Song and Harmonize Too

== See also ==
- Harmonic (disambiguation)
- Harmony (disambiguation)
- Harmonisation (disambiguation)
