= Harmonisation (disambiguation) =

Harmonisation or harmonize may refer to:

== Music ==
- Harmonization, in music, the implementation of harmony, usually by using chords, including harmonized scales
- Harmonize (singer) (born 1994), a Tanzanian musician
- Last verse harmonisation, a technique of hymn accompaniment used by church organists

== Law ==
- Harmonisation of law, the process of establishing common laws, treaties and standards
- Maximum harmonisation, a term used in European Union law, indicates a level that national law may not go beyond
- Minimum harmonisation, a term used in European Union law, indicates a threshold which national legislation must meet
- Tax harmonization, a process of adjusting tax systems of different jurisdictions in the pursuit of a common policy objective

== Standards ==
- Harmonization (standards), the process of minimizing redundant or conflicting standards which may have evolved independently
- Standardization
- International standardization
- Harmonized System, a standardized system of names and numbers to classify traded products, as a basis for customs tariffs and for collecting trade statistics.

== Other ==
- Gospel harmony, an attempt to compile the canonical gospels of the Christian New Testament into a single account
- Gun harmonisation, the aiming of fixed guns or cannon carried in the wings of a fighter aircraft
- Socialist Harmonious Society, Chinese leader Hu Jintao's signature ideology
- Harmonious and River crab (Internet slang), internet slang created by Chinese netizens, referring to censorship

== See also ==
- Harmonic (disambiguation)
- Harmony (disambiguation)
- Harmonizer (disambiguation)
