= Harmony School =

Harmony School may refer to:

- One of the Harmony Public Schools in Texas
- Harmony School (Indiana) in Bloomington
- Harmony School, School District No. 53 in Otoe County, Nebraska, near Nebraska City

== See also ==
- Harmony (disambiguation)
- Harmony Heights School
- Harmony Independent School District
- Harmony Middle School
- Harmony Union School District
