= Harmonia (disambiguation) =

Harmonia is the Greek goddess of harmony and concord.

Harmonia may also refer to:

== Mythology ==
- Harmonia (nymph), lover of god Ares and mother of the Amazons

== Antiquity ==
- Harmonia (philosophy), a concept in Pythagoreanism
- Harmonia (Gelo) (3rd. ct.), daughter of Gelo, the son of Hieron II, king of Syracuse

== Art ==
- Harmonia (comics), a DC Comics character based on the Greek goddess
- Harmonia (sculpture), a 1996 outdoor sculpture by Achim Kühn in Turku, Finland
- Harmonia, a 2021 short film directed by McLean Jackson
- Harmonia (video game), a 2016 visual novel by Key
- Harmonia, a film directed and co-written by Guy Nattiv
- Kingdom of Harmonia, the setting of Dungeon Keeper 2

== Biology ==
- Harmonia (beetle), a genus of lady beetles
- Harmonia (plant), a genus of tarweeds
- Harmonia Tiger-wing, a species of butterfly

== Music ==
- Harmonia (band), a 1970s German band
- Harmonia Ensemble, an Italian chamber music group
- Harmonia Sacra, an 1832 music textbook
- Harmonia, an early music radio show produced by WFIU
- Harmonia, 2005 album by Broken Dog
- Harmonia, 2008 album by Lô Borges
- Harmonia (album), a 2009 album by Akiko Shikata
- "Harmonia", song by ChouCho
- "Harmonia" (song), a 2003 song by Rythem
- "Harmonia", song by Cass McCombs from Catacombs
- composition by Hans-Joachim Roedelius

== Other uses ==
- 40 Harmonia, an asteroid
- Harmonia, Rio Grande do Sul, Brazil
- Harmonia, a ship that shipwrecked at Wiay, Inner Hebrides, 1869

== See also ==
- Harmony (disambiguation)
