= Virnamäki =

Archaeological site in Turku, Finland

Coordinates: 60°27′58.6263″N 22°19′7.8837″E

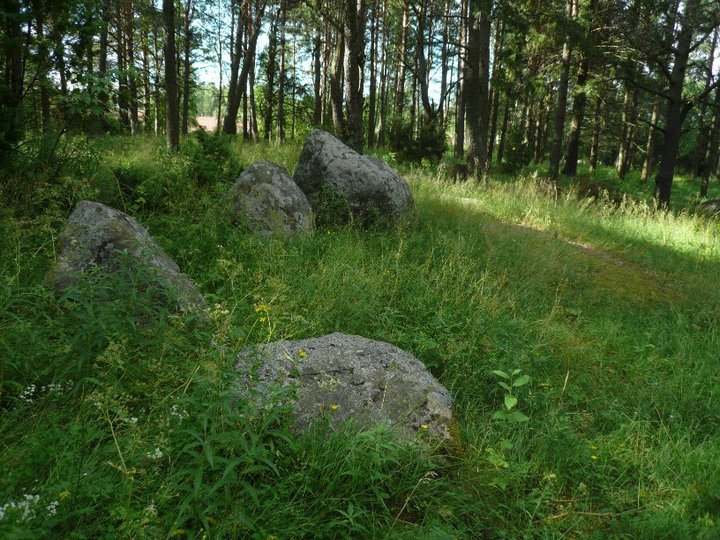
Stones on Virnamäki

Virnamäki (Finnish 'vetch hill') is a hill and glade ancient monument area from the Iron Age in Turku, Finland. In addition to having been a dwelling site, the area is also known for its cremation cemeteries under level ground and also multiple stones with cup marks. The area is protected under the Finnish Antiquities Act (Muinaismuistolaiki). Virnamäki has a 1.5 km (0.932 mi) nature trail, with a 250-meter (820.5 feet) long stretch of cultural landscape along the Aurajoki that includes the Komosten kummut, two natural mounds with traces of dwelling from the Iron Age.
