= Santeri Salokivi =

Finnish painter (1886–1940)

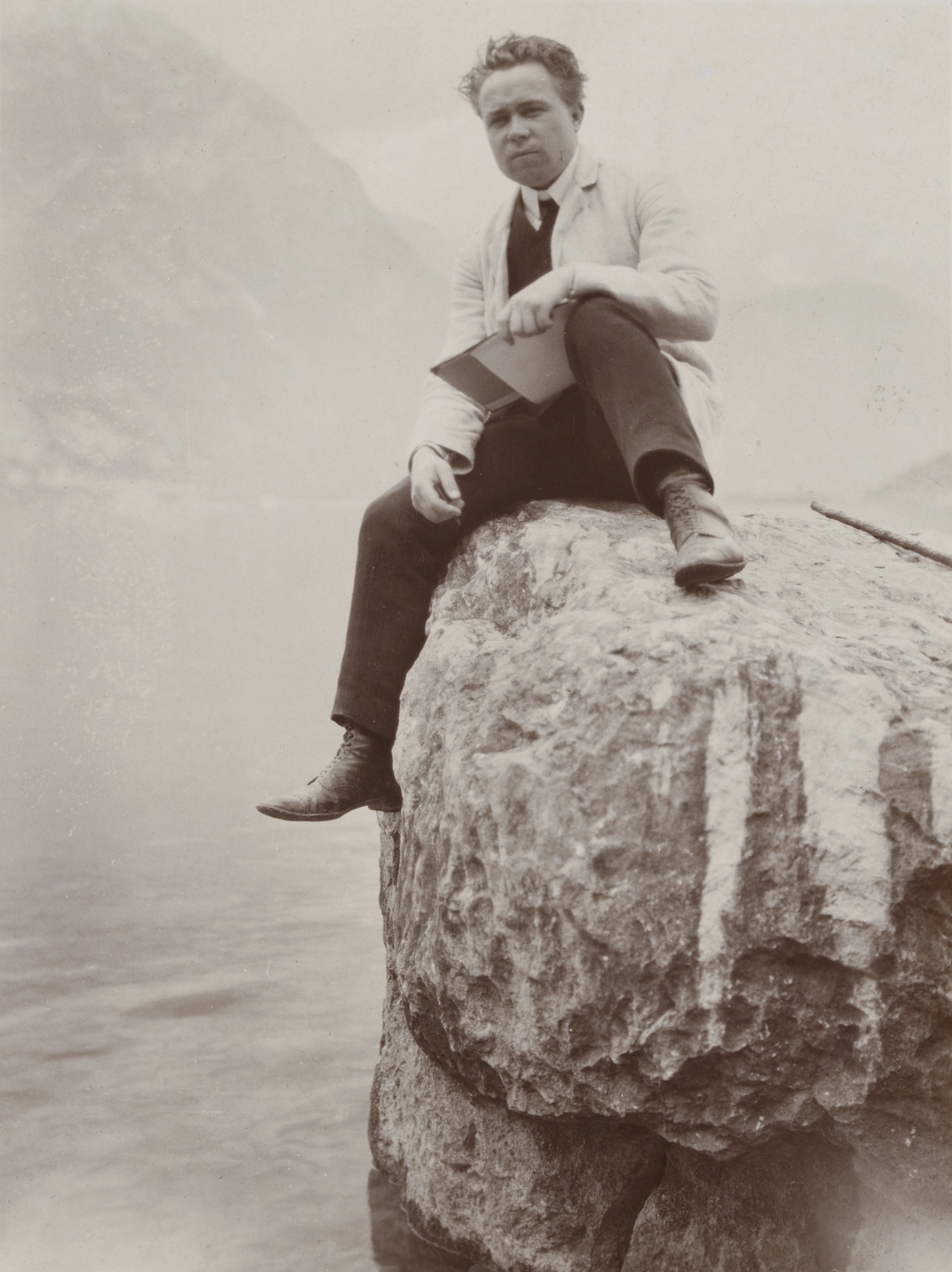
- Salokivi at Lake Garda in Italy
- Born: Toivo Santeri Johansson; 2 September 1886; Turku, Grand Duchy of Finland
- Died: 26 March 1940 (aged 53); Helsinki, Finland
- Known for: Painter
- Movement: Impressionism

Toivo Santeri Salokivi – Johansson until 1900 – (2 September 1886, Turku – 26 March 1940, Helsinki), was a Finnish painter and graphic artist.

== Biography ==
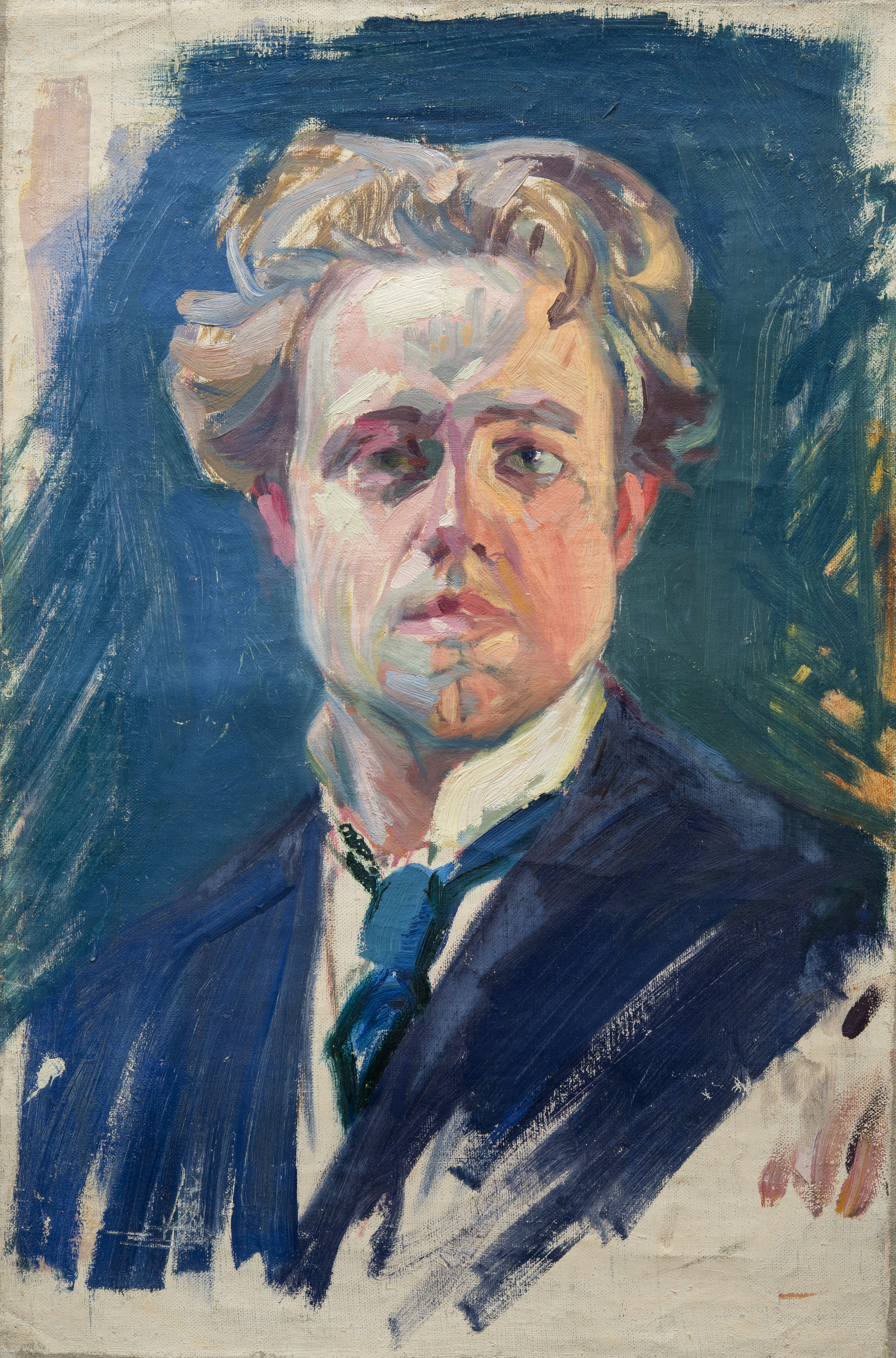
Self-Portrait

Salokivi studied at the Turku Drawing School between 1900–1904 and thereafter in Munich and Paris. He taught at the Turku Drawing School between 1914–1917 and ran his own painting school in Helsinki between 1931 and 1933. Salokivi's works are greatly influenced by light saturation. His works include impressionistic archipelago motifs, figure compositions and finely executed etchings.

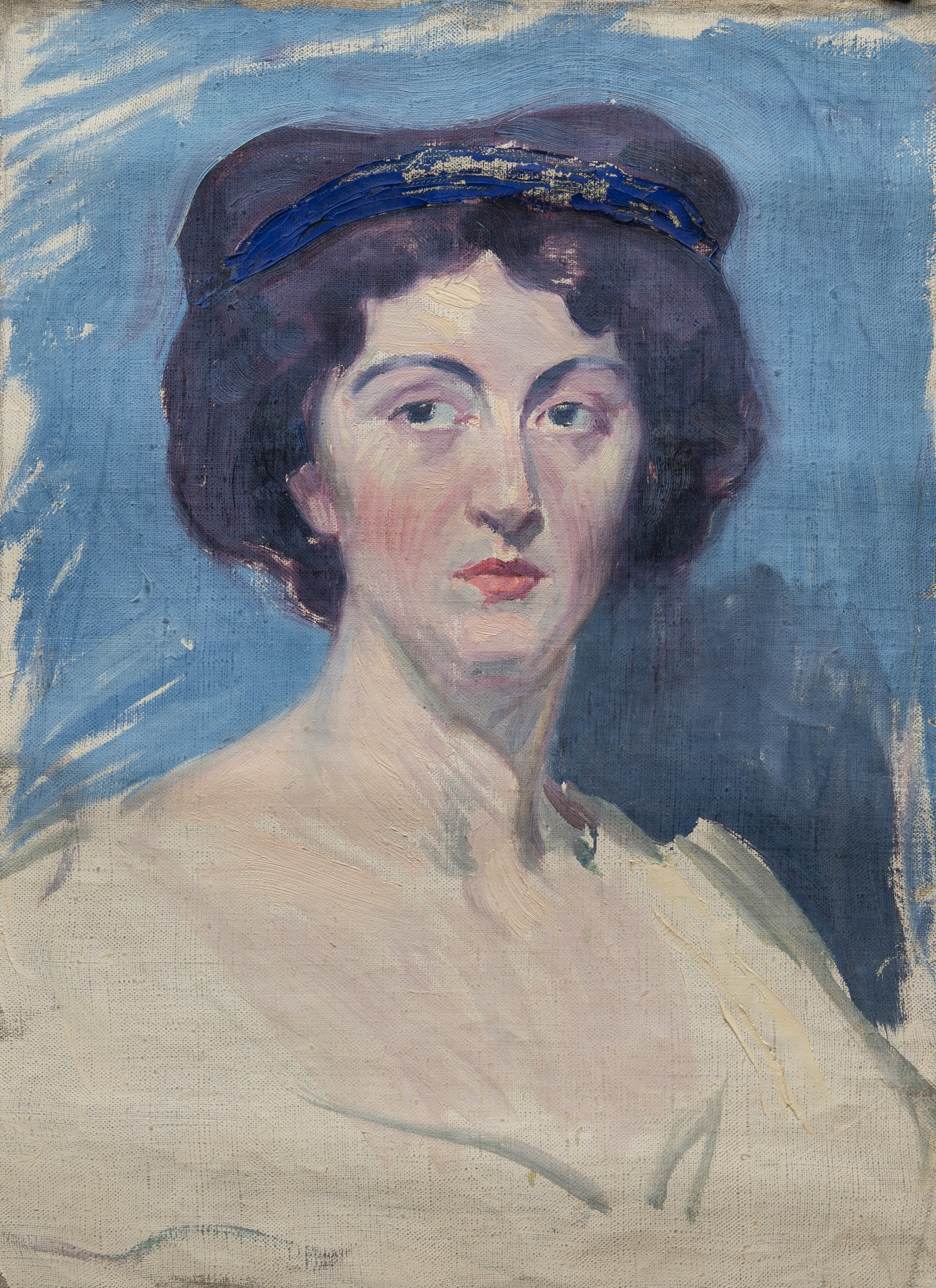
Portrait of Majsi Salokivi

His wife was Majsi Salokivi (1888–1953), née Maria Mattson.

He is buried in the Hietaniemi Cemetery in Helsinki.

== Works ==
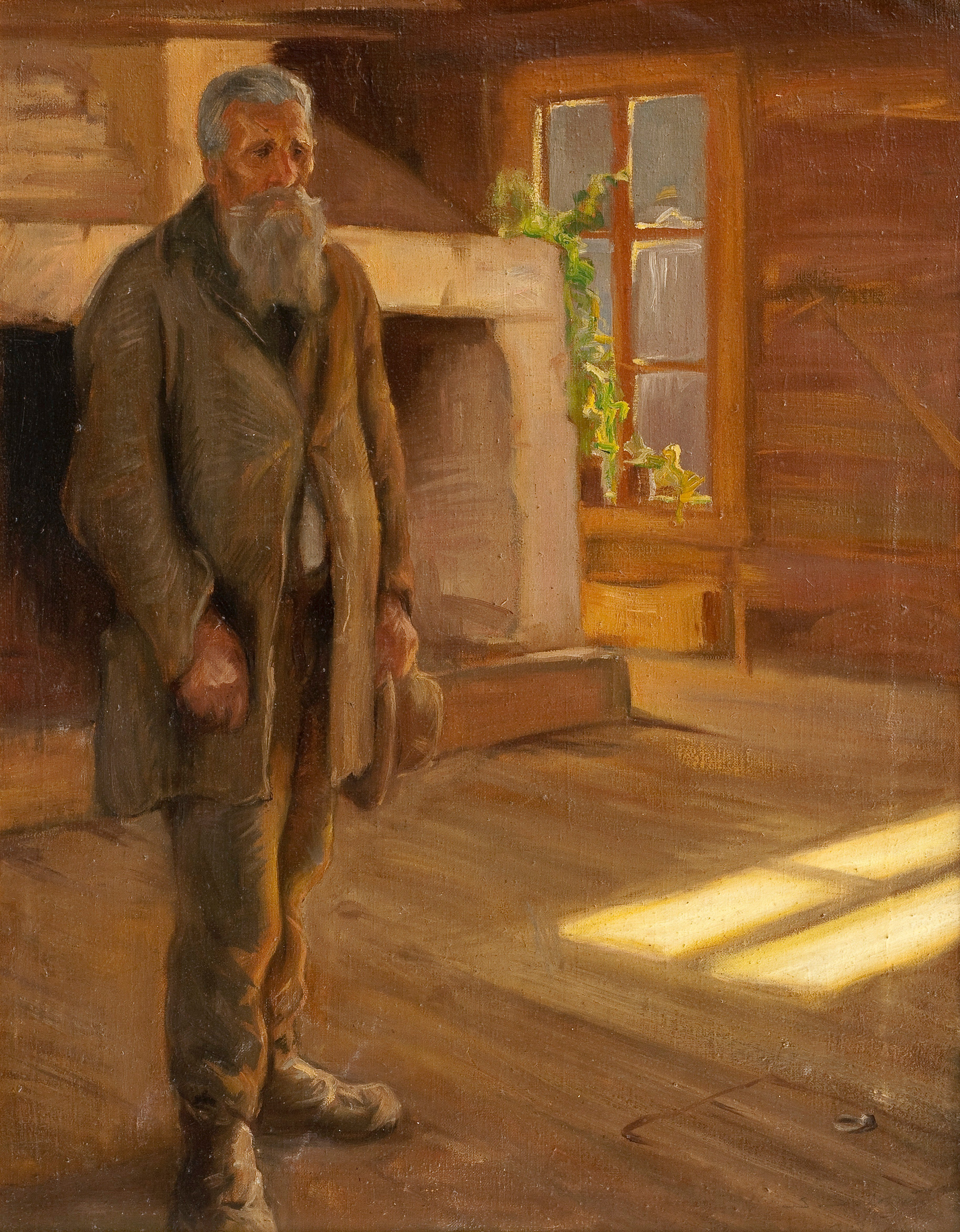
Crofter, 1905

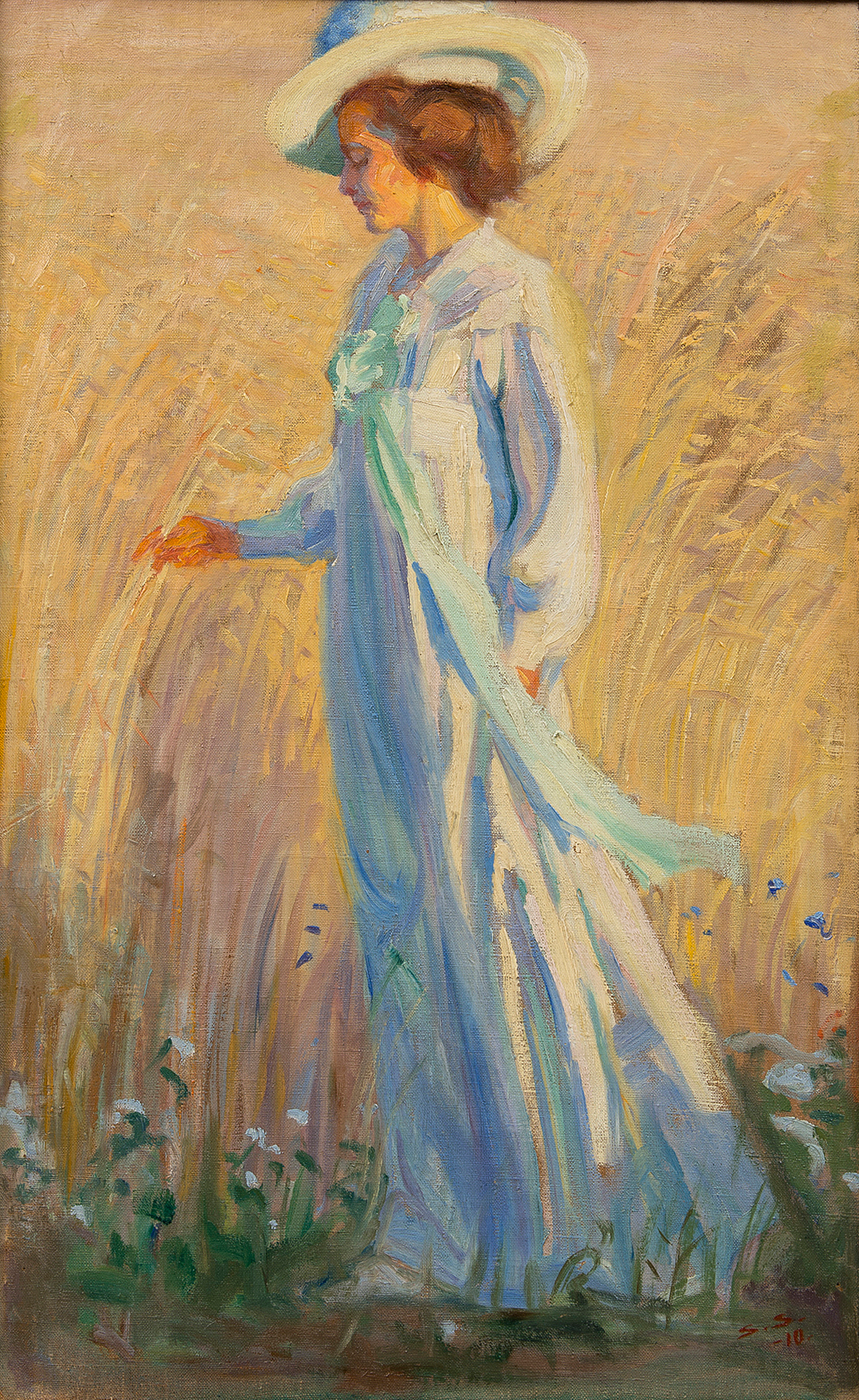
Fluttery Summer Dress, 1910

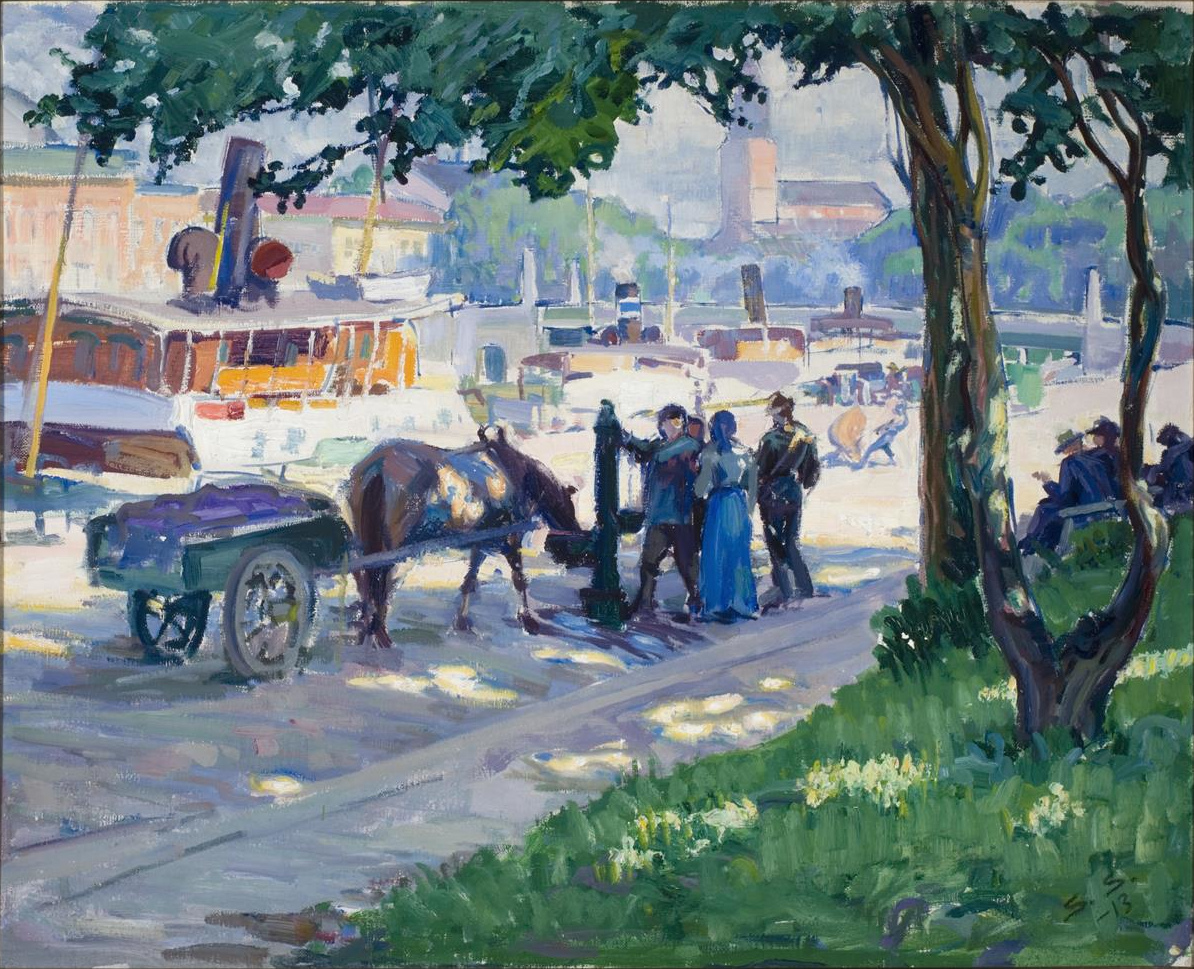
View from the Bank of Aura River, 1913

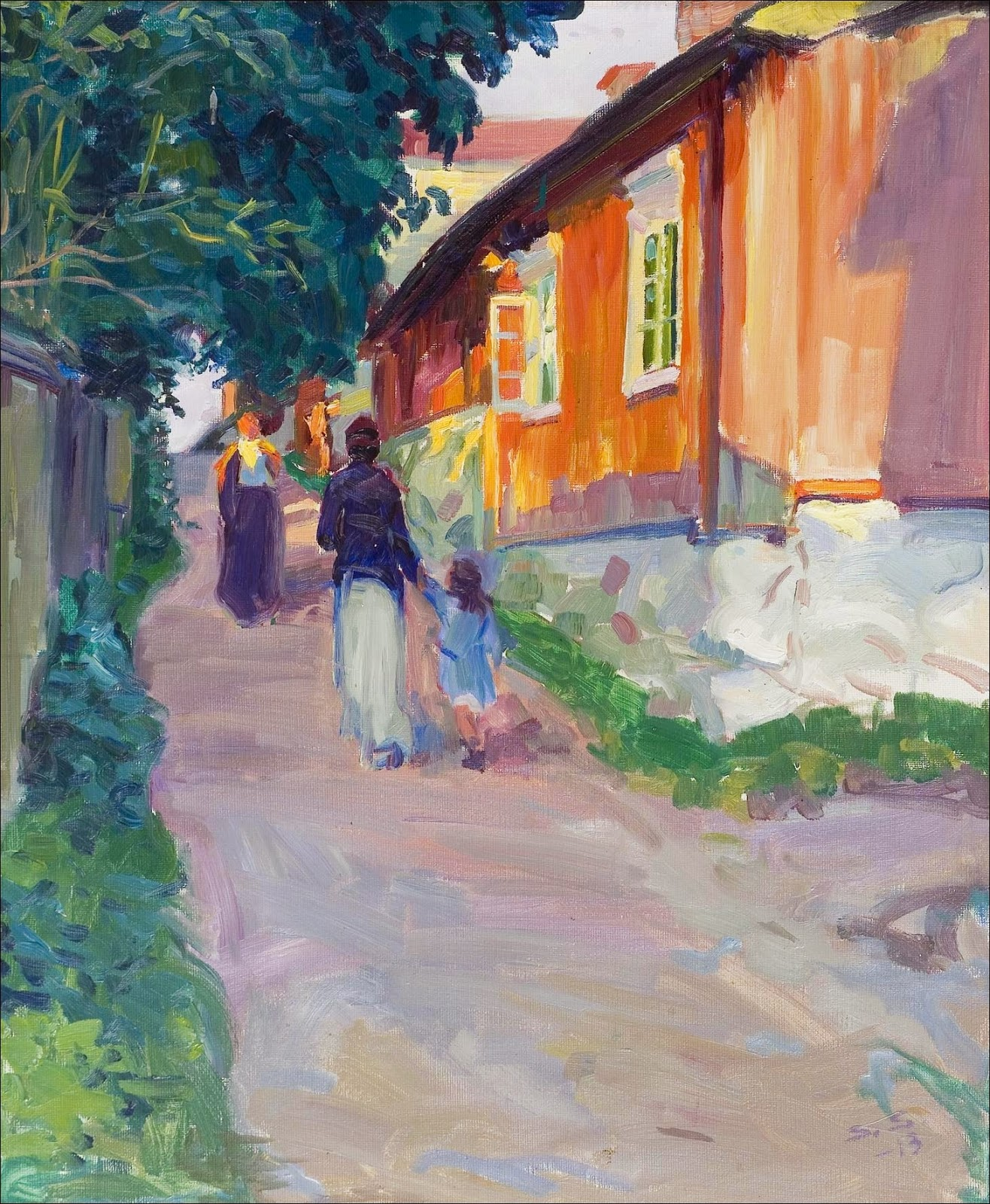
Alley in Naantali, 1913

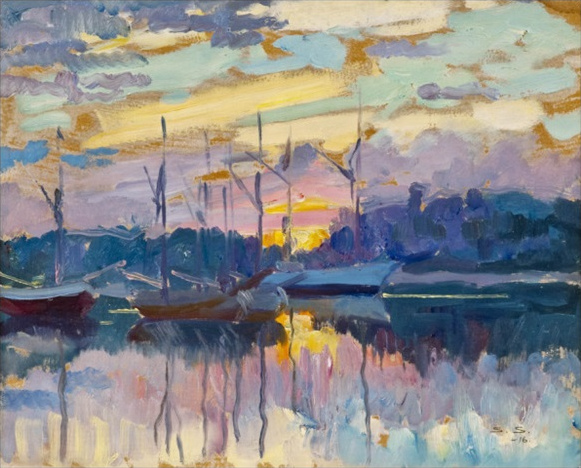
Sunset in Pargas, 1916

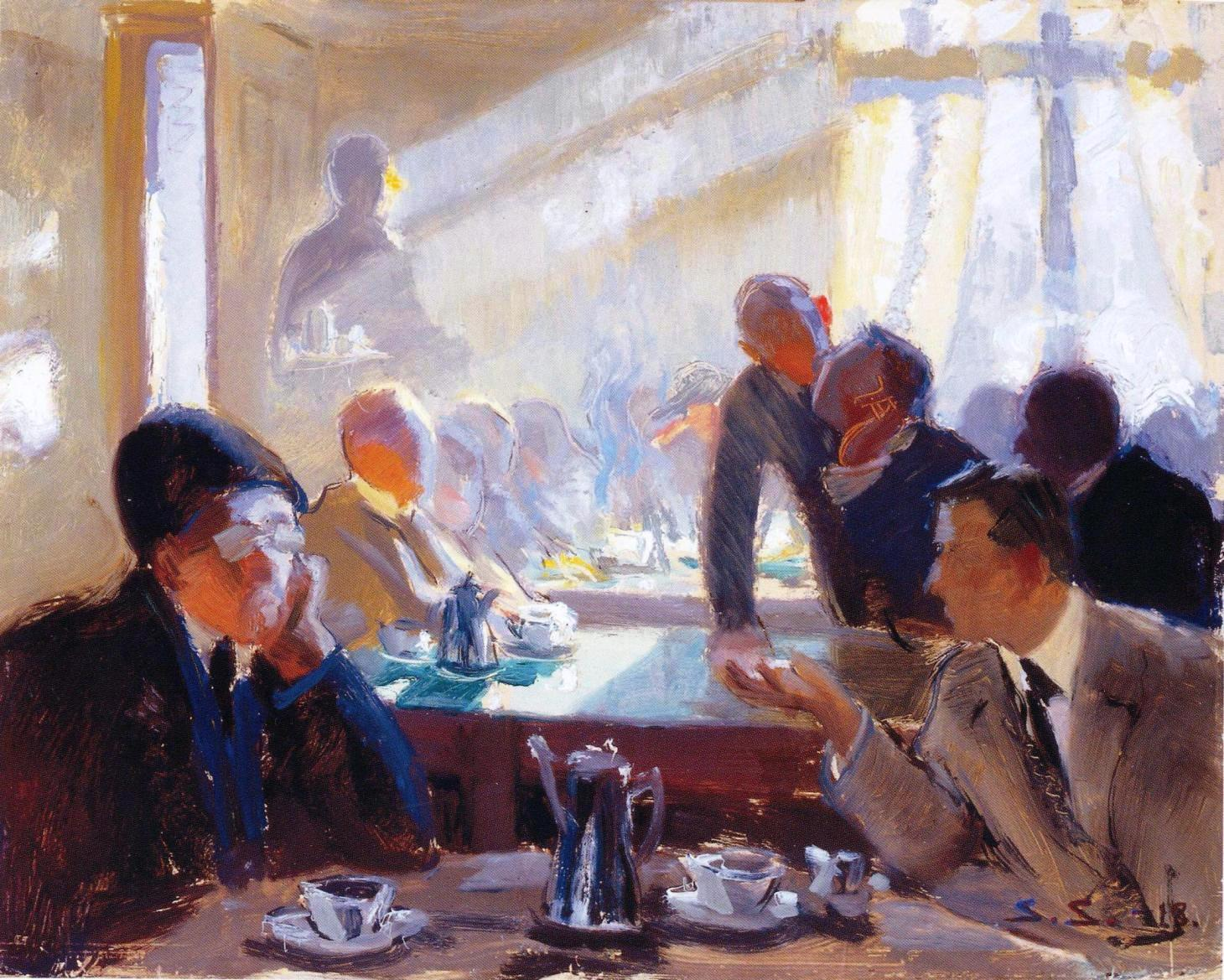
Café, 1918

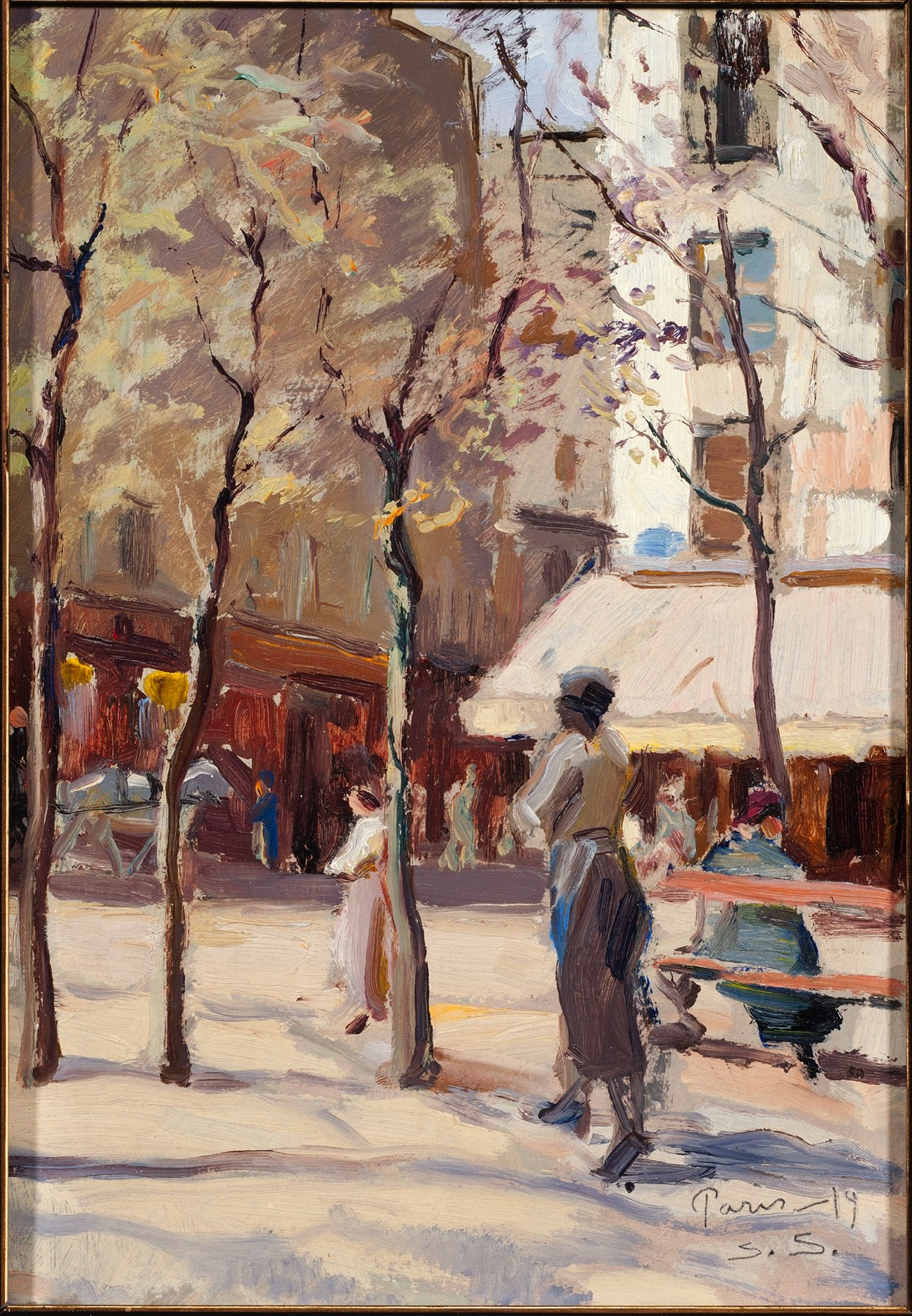
Paris, 1919

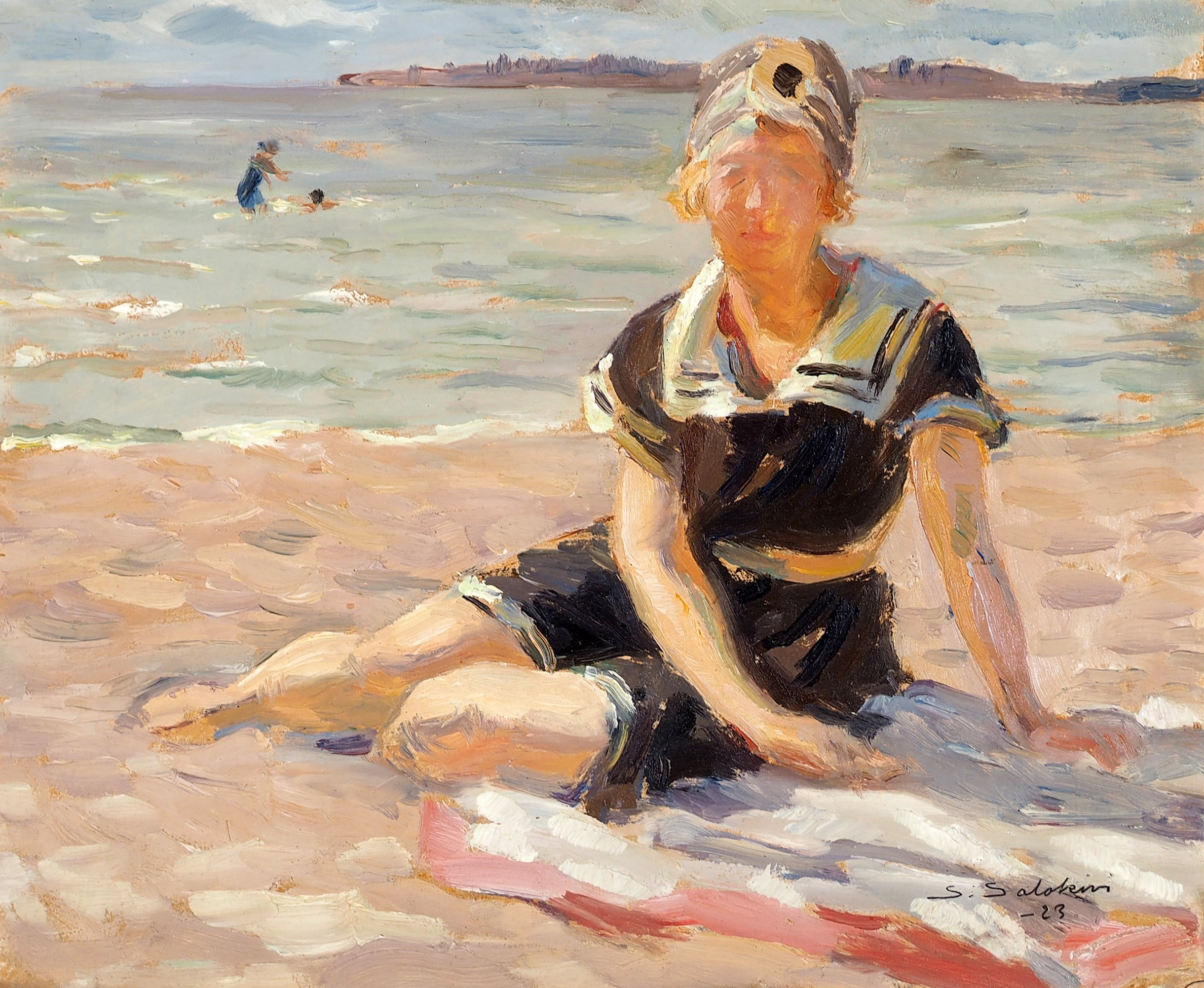
On a Sandy Beach, 1923

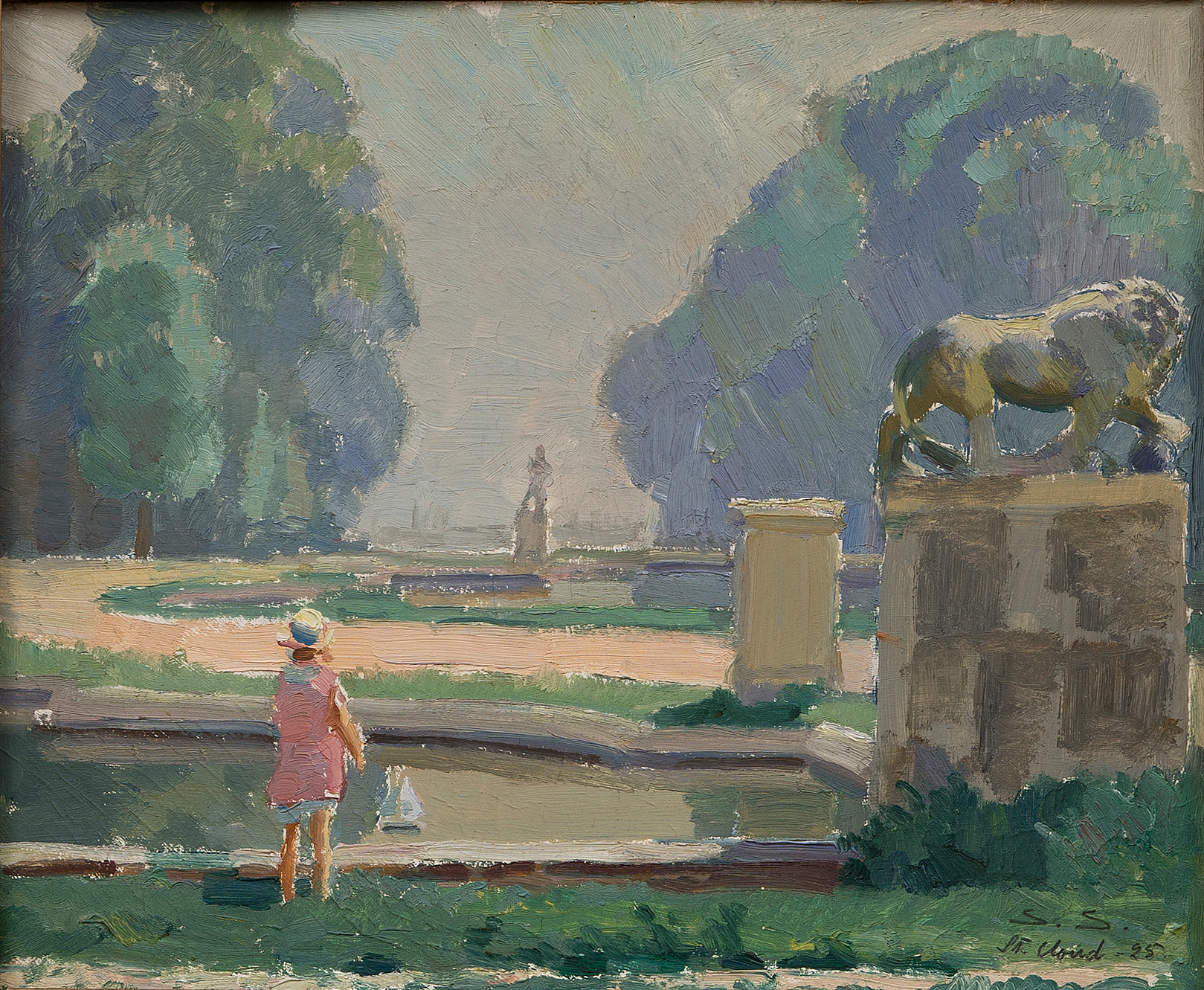
Girl in the Park, 1925

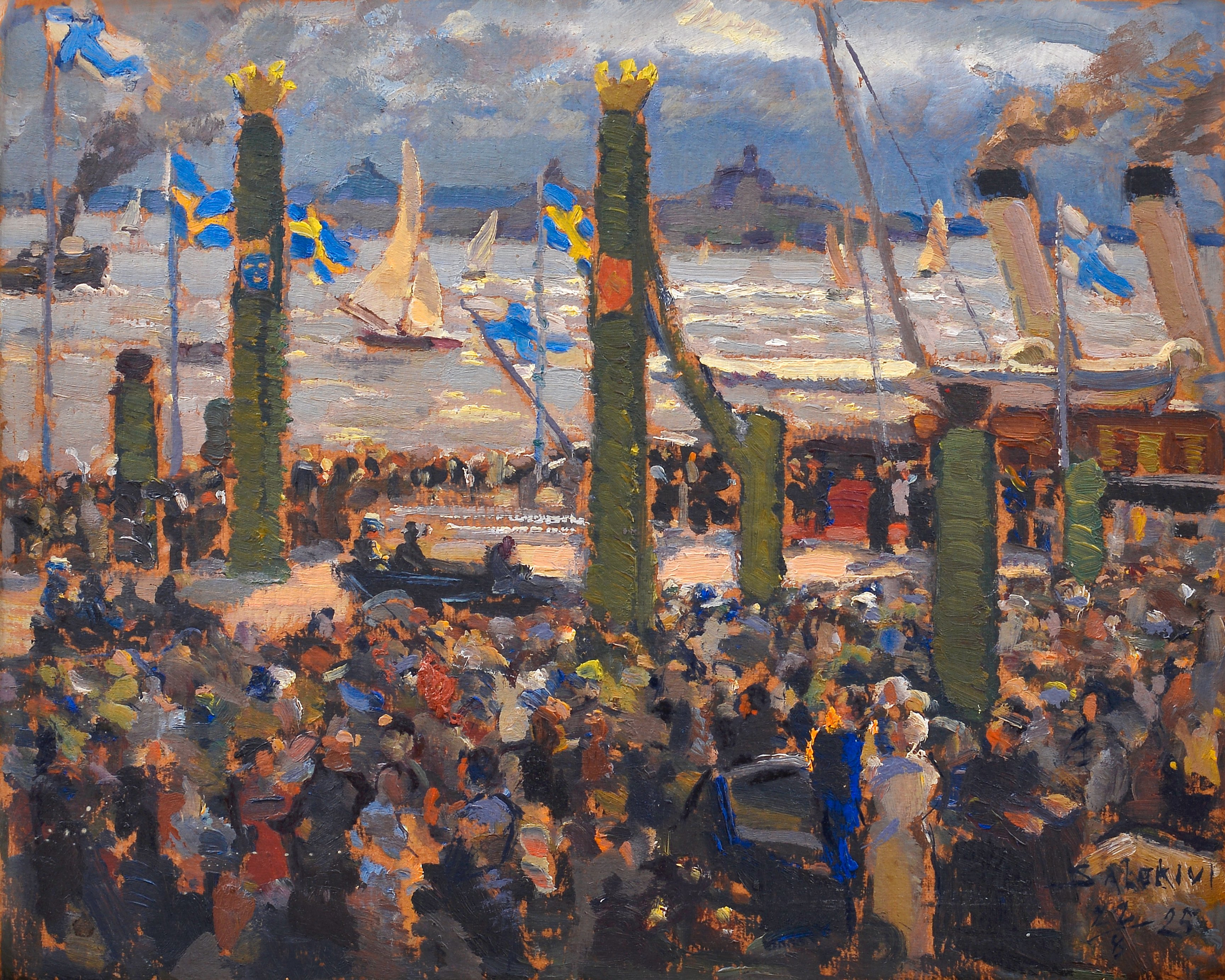
Gustaf V Visiting Finland, 22 August 1925

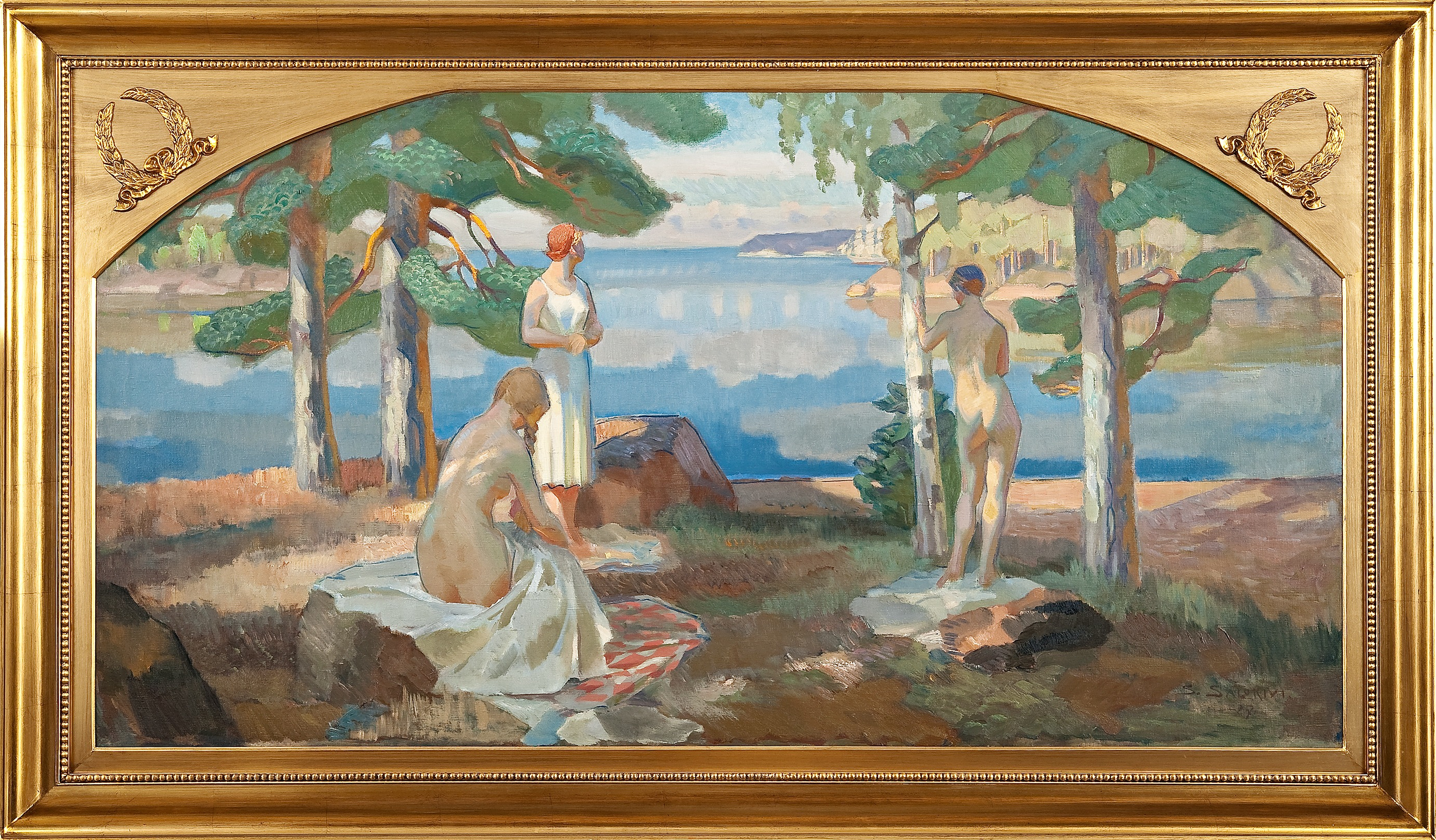
Summer Day in Nature, 1927

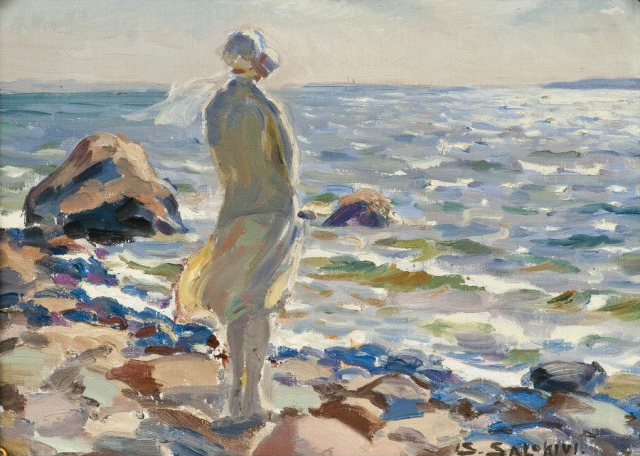
Woman at the Beach, 1929

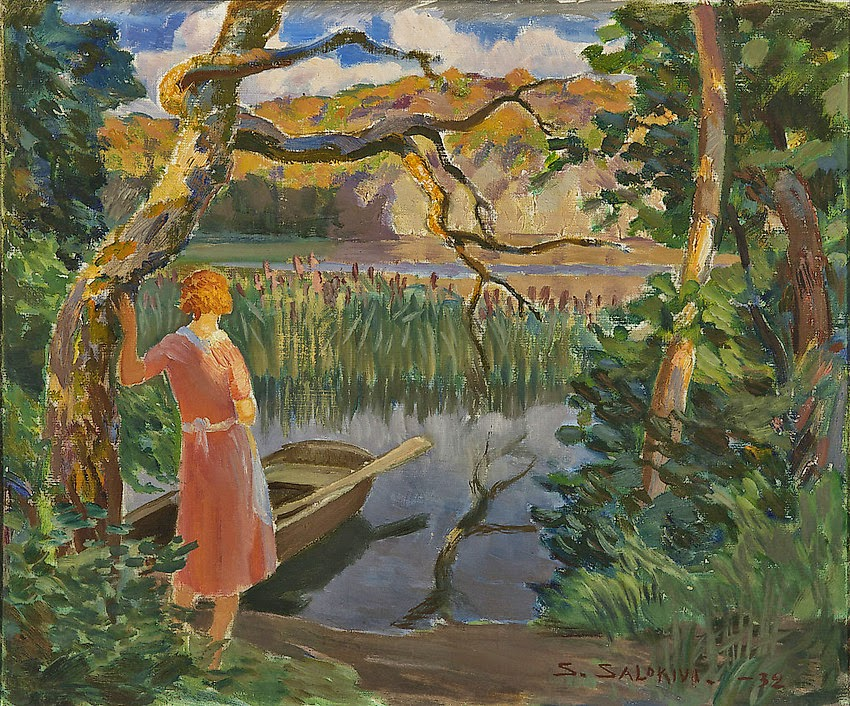
Woman on a Shore, Scene from Åland, 1932

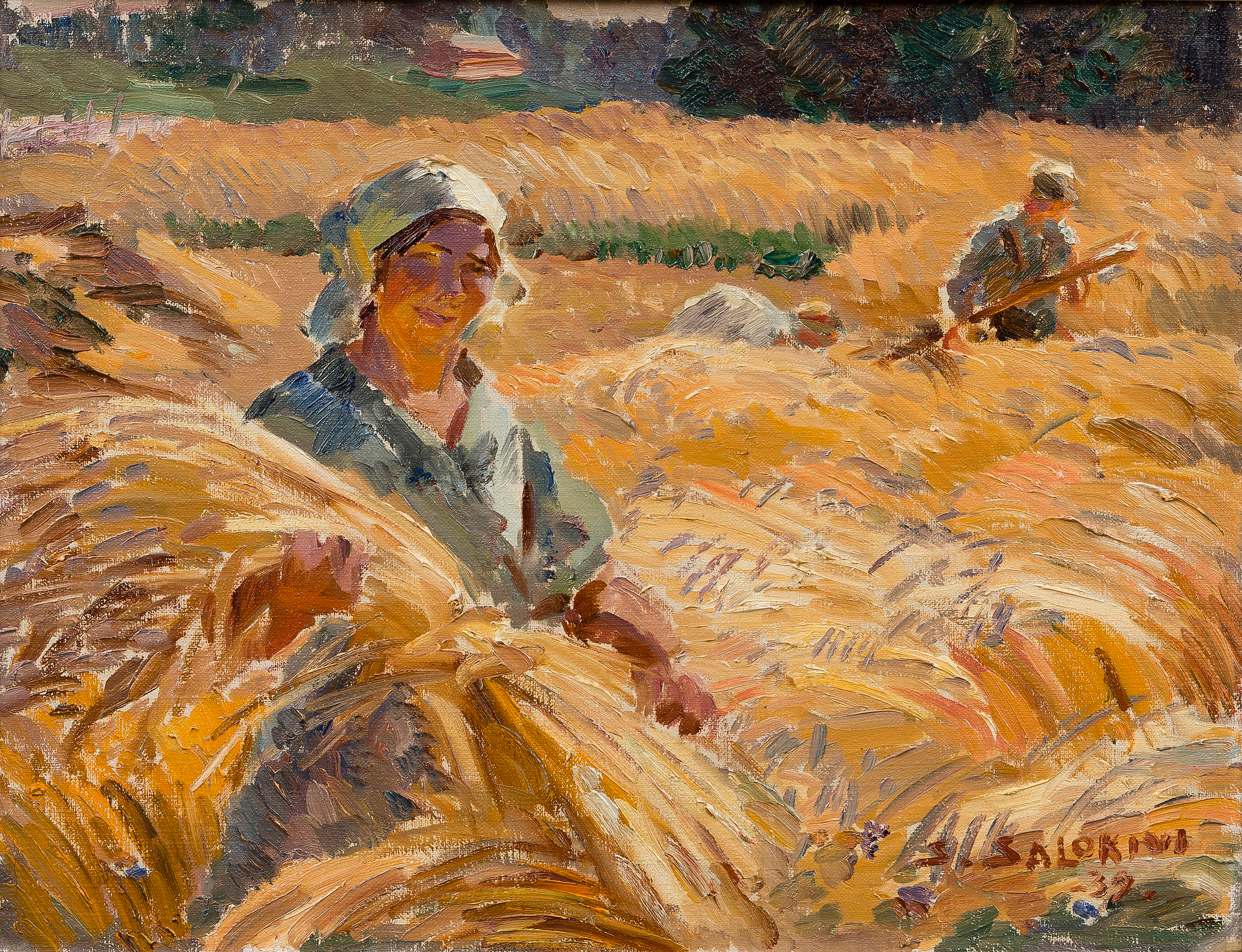
Harvest, 1937

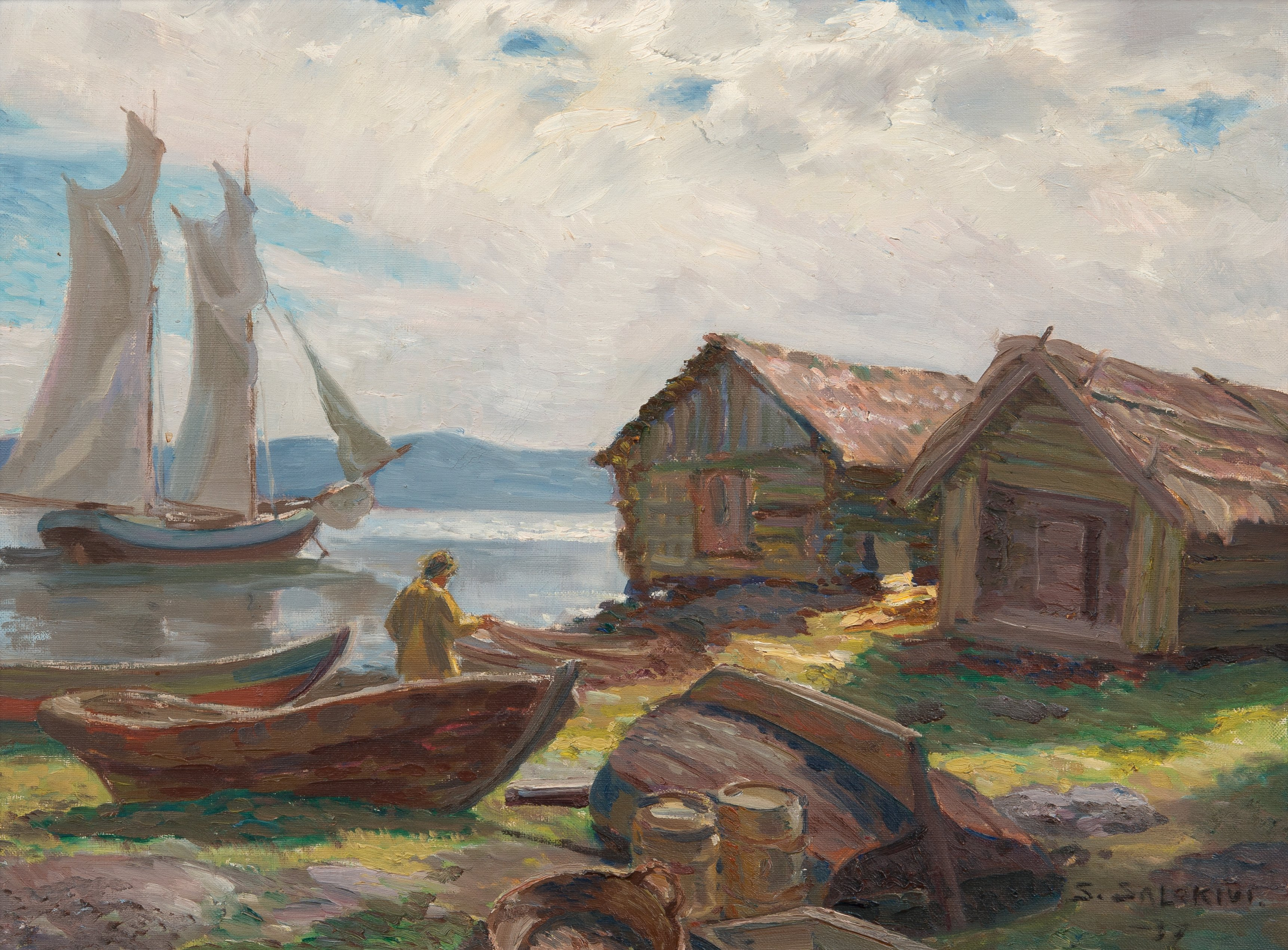
Fishing Huts, 1937

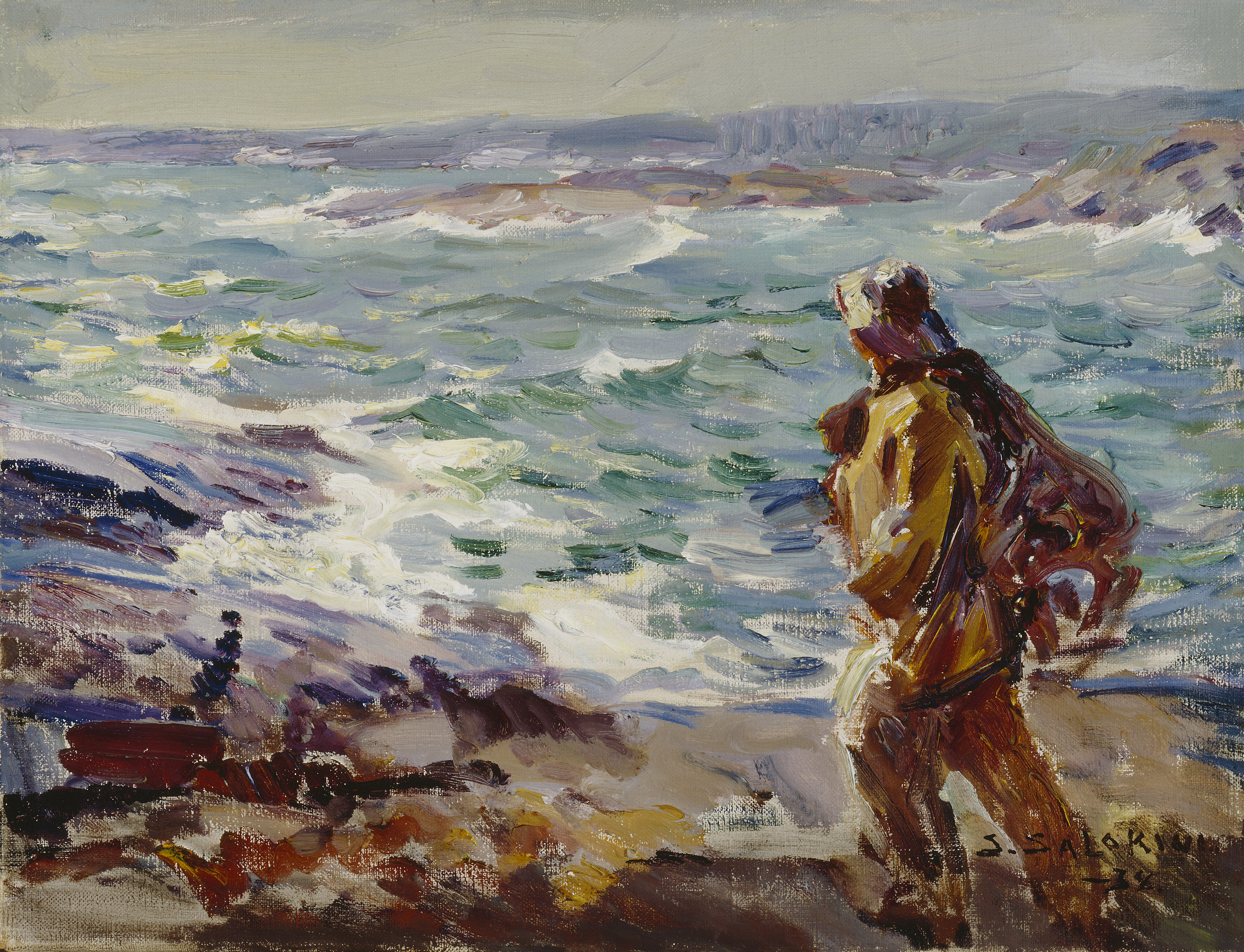
Towards the Sun, 1938

== See also ==
- Finnish art

== Sources ==
- Salokivi, Santeri at Uppslagsverket Finland.
