= Jang Myung Sun =

South Korean glitch pop musician

- Born: 1994
- Origin: Ansan, South Korea
- Genres: Glitch pop, indie pop, electronic, folk
- Years active: 2014–present
- Labels: 1000 Rockets

Jang Myung Sun (Korean: 장명선) (born 1994) is a South Korean musician. She released two studio albums: A Premature and Meaningless Confession (이르고 무의미한 고백) (2018) and Angel's Share (천사의 몫) (2023).

== Career ==
Jang Myung Sun started her music career in 2014. She was a folk musician when she debuted, but changed her genre to electronic music after seeing a performance by electronic musician Lee Moon. She learned electronic music from Kirara. She released her first studio album, A Premature and Meaningless Confession (이르고 무의미한 고백) on 7 December 2018, which Jeon Daehan of Weiv described the album as of relatively calm synthesisers presenting melodies over the flashing glitch effect. The album was nominated for Best Dance & Electronic Album at the 2020 Korean Music Awards.

She released an EP Dear My Ghost Sibling : Come, I Swallowed All Sorrows (나의 유령 자매에게 : 이리 와, 내가 모든 슬픔을 삼켰어) in 2020. She has prepared a new studio album for 2023, she performed the track from the new album Nature Is You, on Naver Onstage. She participated in the indie project Musician Sports Club with Xeuda, Yeram, Yoonsung, Jungwoo, and Cacophony. Her second studio album Angel's Share (천사의 몫) was released on 3 November.

== Discography ==
=== Studio albums ===
- A Premature and Meaningless Confession (이르고 무의미한 고백) (2018)
- Angel's Share (천사의 몫) (2023)

=== EPs ===
- Dear My Ghost Sibling : Come, I Swallowed All Sorrows (나의 유령 자매에게 : 이리 와, 내가 모든 슬픔을 삼켰어) (2020)
