= Harmonia (sculpture) =

Fountain sculpture by Achim Kühn

Coordinates: 60°26′21.2″N 22°14′36.2″E

Harmonia (in Finnish) Harmoni (in Swedish)
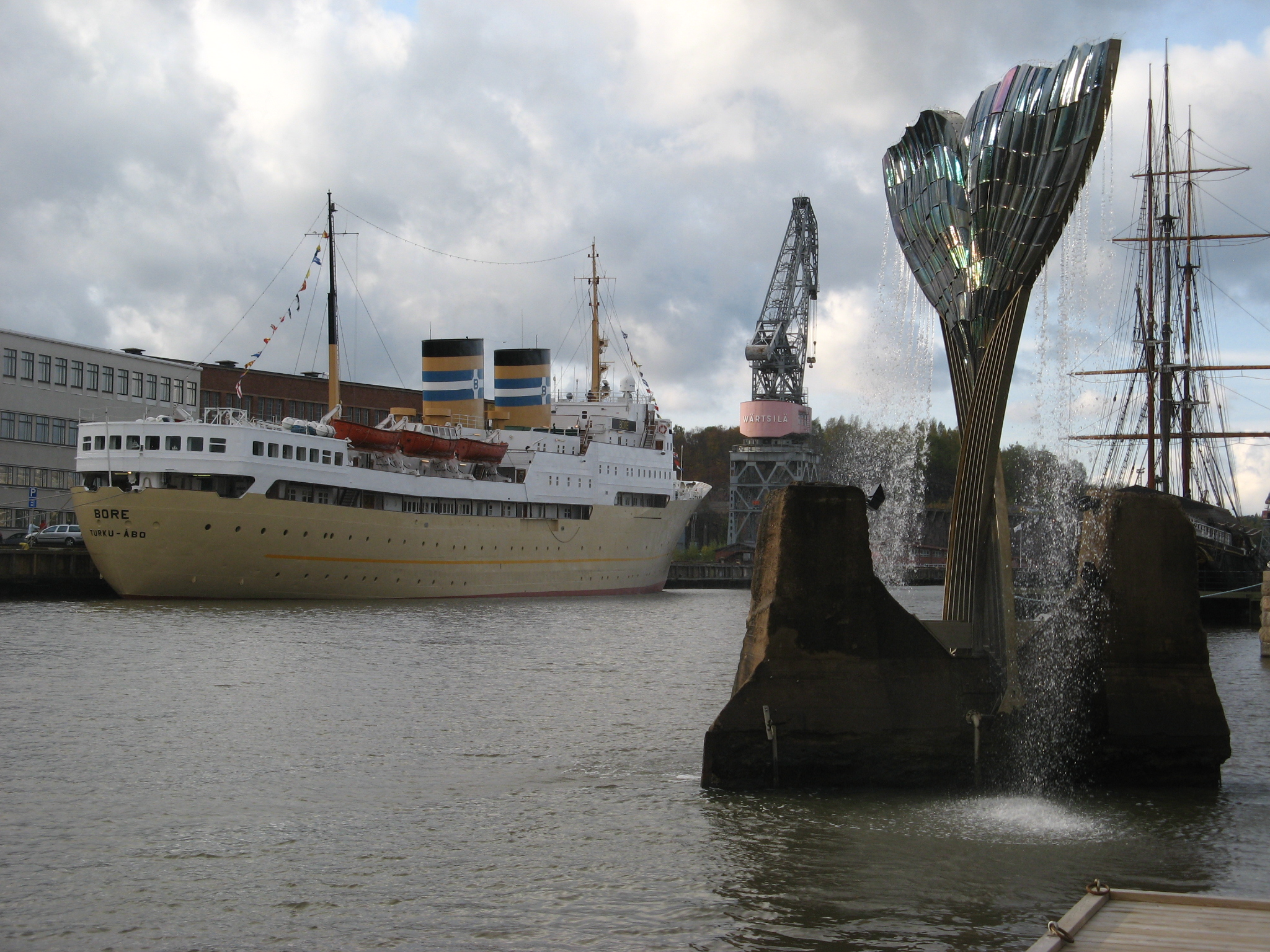
- Artist: Achim Kühn
- Year: 1996
- Type: Steel
- Location: Turku

Harmonia (Finnish) or Harmoni (Swedish, Harmony) is a fountain sculpture by Achim Kühn. It is located in the Aura River in Turku, Finland.
