= Harmony (ship) =

Several ships have been named Harmony:

- Harmony (1794 ship) was a ship built in the United States of America in 1794 that made one voyage for the British East India Company (EIC). She was wrecked in 1804.
- Harmony (1798 ship) was launched in 1798 in Lancaster as a West Indiaman. Between 1805 and 1807 she sailed to the Pacific on a privateering voyage (Spain and England then being at war). Early in the war she engaged in a single ship action in which her target repelled the attack, killing Harmony's master and inflicting severe casualties on her. Although Harmony returned to trading with the West Indies, in 1817 she made one voyage to India under a licence from the British East India Company. On her return she traded between Hull and Petersburg, and Quebec. New owners in 1821 decided to use her as a whaler in the northern whale fishery. She was lost there on her first whaling voyage.
