= Cacophony (musician) =

South Korean art pop musician

- Born: Kim Minkyeong; 29 April 1994 (age 31)
- Origin: South Korea
- Genres: Art pop
- Years active: 2018–present
- Labels: Enchanter

Kim Minkyeong (Korean: 김민경; born 29 April 1994), better known by her stage name Cacophony (카코포니), is a South Korean art pop musician. She has released three studio albums: Harmony (화 [和]) (2018), Dream (몽 [夢]) (2019) and DIPUC (2023).

== Career ==
Before her debut, Cacophony majored in business administration and French literature at Yonsei University. While preparing for the Foreign Service exam, Cacophony's mother was diagnosed with lung cancer, and while nursing her mother, she decided to change course to music, which was her real dream. After her mother's death, she began to work on the record immediately after the funeral, and released her first studio album Harmony (화 [和]) in 2018.

Following the release of her first album, she immediately began recording her second album Dream (몽 [夢]), was released in 2019. She interviewed that she recorded the album on the theme of parting and love. The album was nominated for Best Pop Album at the 2020 Korean Music Awards. In 2021, she released an EP Reborn. In 2022, she released the single The Marvelous Absence (황홀한 실종) and had a solo concert.

In 2023, she announced the release of her third album DIPUC. She released two singles, Change (변화) and End before the album was released. She participated in the indie project Musician Sports Club with Xeuda, Yeram, Yoonsung, Jungwoo, and Jang Myung Sun.

== Discography ==
=== Studio albums ===
- Harmony (화 [和]) (2018)
- Dream (몽 [夢]) (2019)
- DIPUC (2023)

=== EPs ===
- Reborn (2021)
