= Harmoni (disambiguation) =

Harmoni was a former health care company of the UK.

Harmoni may also refer to:

- Harmoni (Transjakarta), Transjakarta bus rapid transit station located on Hayam Wuruk Road, Jakarta, Indonesia
- HARMONI, The High Angular Resolution Monolithic Optical and Near-infrared Integral field spectrograph, one of instruments of the Extremely Large Telescope
- Harmoni Turner (born 2001), American basketball player

== See also ==
- Harmony (disambiguation)
