= Harmony (name) =

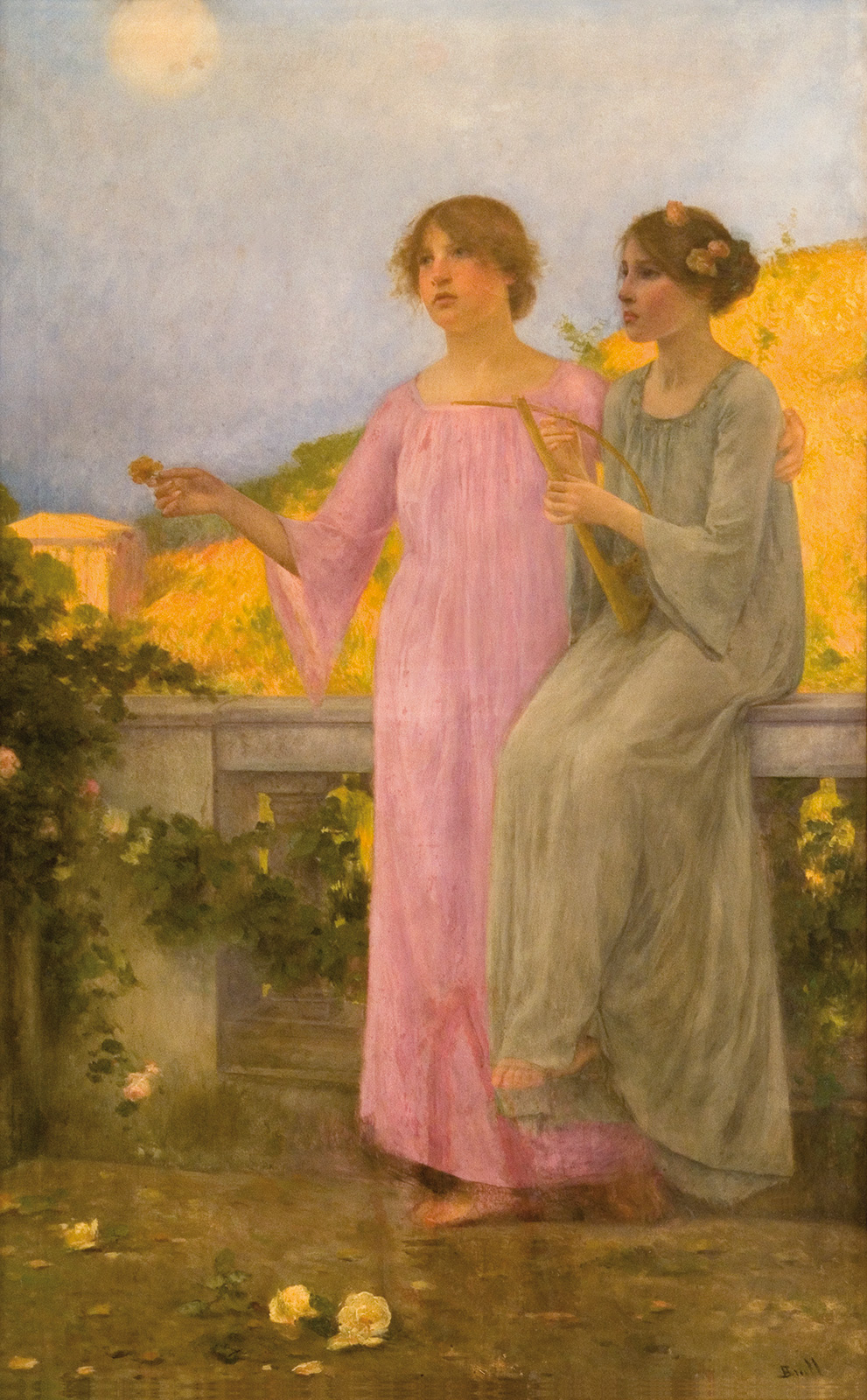
- Harmonia by Joan Brull i Vinyoles.
- Gender: Unisex

Origin
- Origin: English
- Meaning: “harmony” or “concord”

Other names
- Related names: Harmani, Harmone, Harmonee, Harmonei, Harmoney, Harmoni, Harmoniee, Harmonii, Harmonia, Harmonie

Harmony is a modern English name taken from the vocabulary word and from the musical term harmony which is derived from the Greek word harmonia. Harmonia was the Greek goddess of harmony and concord. It is also an English surname.

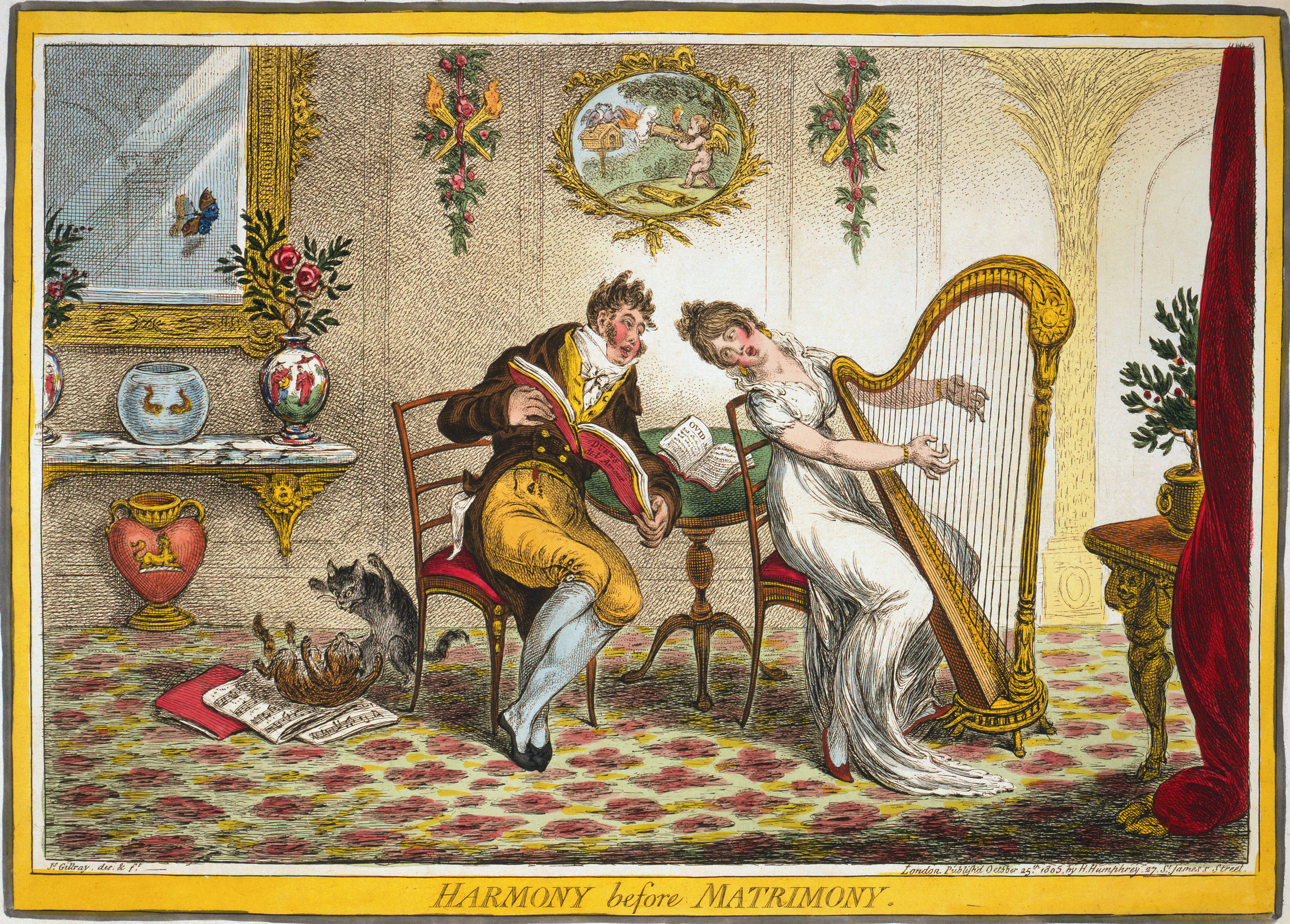
Harmony before Matrimony, an October 25th 1805 caricature by James Gillray depicting a musical courtship.

== Popularity ==
The name has been used since the 1800s. The name has increased in popularity in English-speaking countries in recent years. It was among the 1,000 most popular names for girls in the United States between 1975 and 1983 and again from 1997 to 2021, when it was the 198th most popular name for newborn American girls. It has been among the five hundred most popular names for girls in England and Wales since 2005.

Variants in use for girls in the United States include Harmani, Harmone, Harmonee, Harmonei, Harmoney, Harmoni, Harmonie, Harmoniee, and Harmonii.

It is also in rare use for boys in the United States. Six newborn American boys were given the name in 2020 compared with 1,611 newborn girls. Fewer than five American boys received the name in 2021, compared to 1,499 girls.

== Notable men with the name ==
- Harmony Ikande (born 1990), Nigerian professional footballer
- Harmony Korine (born 1973), American director, contemporary artist, producer, actor, screenwriter, author, photographer and skateboarder.
- Harmony Samuels (born 1980), English record producer, multi-instrumentalist and songwriter.

== Notable women with the name ==
- Harmony Star Dust Grillo (born 1976), American social activist for women who worked in the sex industry and victims of sexual exploitation and trafficking.
- Harmony Hammond (born 1944), American artist, activist, curator, and writer.
- Harmony James, Australian singer-songwriter
- Harmony Santana, American actress
- Harmony Tan (born 1997), French professional tennis player
- Harmony Becker, American graphic novelist and illustrator

== People with the surname ==
- Beni Rae Harmony (born 2001), American political spokesperson
- Chuck Harmony (born 1979), American music producer, musician, songwriter and entrepreneur.
- David B. Harmony (1832–1917), United States Navy rear admiral.
- Robin Harmony (born 1961), American college basketball coach.
- Olga Harmony (1928–2018), Mexican playwright and a drama teacher

== Fictional characters ==
- Harmony, in the television series Glee
- Harmony, in the television series Hi Hi Puffy AmiYumi
- Harmony, in the film Toy Story 4
- Harmony Hamilton or Yolanda Hamilton, in the television series The Young and the Restless
- Harmony Kendall, a vampire character in the television series Buffy the Vampire Slayer and Angel
- Harmony O'Neill, in the television series Shortland Street
- Harmony Parker, in the novel The Queen's Nose by Dick King-Smith
- Harmony Cobel, manager of the severed floor at Lumon Industries in the television series Severance
- Harmony Lane, in the film Kiss Kiss Bang Bang
- Harmony, the female protagonist of Pokémon Legends: Z-A
