= Beni Rae Harmony =

American political spokesperson (born 2001)

- Born: December 13, 2001 (age 24); Springfield, Illinois, U.S.
- Education: Arizona State University; University of Illinois Springfield
- Website: beniraeharmony.com

Beni Rae Harmony (born December 13, 2001) is an American political spokesperson serving as an assistant White House Press Secretary since 2026. She was previously a senior White House correspondent for Real America's Voice and a lifestyle host with WICS.

== Early life and education ==
Harmony was born December 13, 2001 in Springfield, Illinois to Shayna and Jay Harmony. She graduated from Pleasant Plains High School in 2020. She earned online class credits in global management from Arizona State University. Harmony is pursuing a B.S. in political science and government at the University of Illinois Springfield.

== Career ==
Harmony interned for U.S. representatives Paul Gosar and Matt Gaetz. While in college, she worked for Turning Point USA as a producer and administrator from August 2021 to February 2022. She was a lifestyle host for WICS until she left the station due to a tribute she made to Charlie Kirk following his assassination. Harmony resigned in 2025, claiming that the station suspended her because of the tribute; the station's news director denied this.

In September 2025, Harmony joined Real America's Voice where she worked as a Congressional correspondent prior to being promoted to senior White House correspondent. In October 2026, she was appointed to assistant White House Press Secretary. Deputy press secretary Anna Kelly praised Harmony for being "a trusted voice for the MAGA movement as a White House correspondent".
