= Harmony Garden =

Harmony Garden may refer to:

- Harmony Garden, Hong Kong, a public housing estate in Siu Sai Wan, Hong Kong
- Harmony Garden, Scottish Borders
