= Harmony, Nova Scotia =

Community in Nova Scotia, Canada

Coordinates: 45°20′14.73″N 63°12′28″W

Harmony in Nova Scotia

Harmony is an unincorporated community in the Canadian province of Nova Scotia, located in Colchester County. The name of the community dates back to at least 1840, and is presumably descriptive.

One of the earliest settlers of the area was James Smith, who arrived in 1821. A Presbyterian church was erected in the community in 1881.
