= New Harmony =

New Harmony may refer to:

== Places ==
- New Harmony, Indiana
- New Harmony, Mississippi
- New Harmony, Missouri
- New Harmony, Ohio
- New Harmony, Tennessee
- New Harmony, Texas
- New Harmony, Utah

== Organisation ==
- New Harmony (Latvia), Latvian political party

== See also ==
- Ulmus americana 'New Harmony', cultivar of elm
