= Harmony (Cacophony album) =

2018 album by Cacophony

Studio album by Cacophony
- Released: October 4, 2018
- Genre: Art pop
- Length: 33:42
- Language: Korean, English, French
- Label: Fluxus Music

Cacophony chronology
Harmony (2018)	Dream (2019)

Harmony (Korean: 화; Hanja: 和) is the debut studio album by South Korean art pop musician Cacophony, released 4 October 2018.

== Background ==
While preparing for the Foreign Service exam, Cacophony heard about her mother's lung cancer. In an interview, Cacophony stated she focused on music as a career after hearing her mother state she regretted much of her life. Cacophony began recording the album immediately following her mother's funeral; most of the songs were completed in two weeks. The album name means that "dissonance sings harmony".

== Critical reception ==
Music critic Seojeongmingab wrote, "In the album, Cacophony shows almost all of the emotions and narratives she is trying to show in the tone of her mournful, desperate, and urgent voice."

Focusing on the track "Rosetta", Music Y's Kim Seonghwan indicated that "while female musicians are making progress in the electronic music scene," the song "confirm[s] the emergence of another great newcomer."

== Track listing ==
No.	Title	Length
1.	"Breath" ("숨")	3:15
2.	"kk"	2:51
3.	"In the End"	3:48
4.	"Comme un poisson dans le ciel"	3:30
5.	"Sickboy"	4:33
6.	"Tell Me"	4:38
7.	"Rosetta" ("로제타")	3:37
8.	"White"	4:37
9.	"Spring" ("봄")	2:53
