= Harmony (1794 ship) =

History
- Name: Harmony
- Owner: Rusk & Co.
- Builder: New England
- Launched: 1794
- Fate: Wrecked 13 December 1804

General characteristics
- Tons burthen: 312 (bm)
- Propulsion: Sail
- Armament: 10 × 6-pounder guns

Harmony was a ship built in the United States of America in 1794 that made one voyage for the British East India Company (EIC). She wrecked in 1804.

== EIC voyage ==
Captain James Wickham sailed from Torbay on 8 January 1801, bound for Madras and Bengal. Harmony reached Tenerife on 24 January, and arrived at Madras on 17 June and Calcutta on 16 July. Returning home, she was at the Cape of Good Hope on 15 December, and arrived at the Downs on 21 February 1802.

== Ambiguity ==
A key source on EIC vessels identifies Harmony as a vessel of 312 tons (bm), Rusk & Co., owner. Unfortunately, there were two vessels named Harmony, both built in the United States, both of about the same burthen, that were sailing at the same time, one with Wickham, master, and one with Wilkinson, master. Lloyd's Register for 1804 only reported one. The Register of Shipping for 1804 separated the two, but may have confused details between them.

Master	Owner	Trade	Place of launch	Year of launch	Burthen	Source
J. Wickham	Rusk & Co.	London—India	New England	1794	312	Lloyd's Register
Wickam	Miller & Co.	London—India	Philadelphia	1793	317	Register of Shipping
Wilkinson	Rusk & Co.	London-Philadelphia	New England	1794	312	Register of Shipping

Clarifying the issue will require a third, independent source, or original research.

== Fate ==
On 13 December 1804 Harmony, Wickham, master, was returning to London from Sumatra when she ran ashore at Deal. She was wrecked and only a small part of her cargo could be saved.
