= Harmony, New Jersey =

Harmony, New Jersey may refer to the following places in the United States:

- Harmony Township, New Jersey
- Harmony, Monmouth County, New Jersey
- Harmony, Ocean County, New Jersey
- Harmony, Salem County, New Jersey
- Harmony (CDP), New Jersey
