= Harmony, West Virginia =

- Unincorporated community
- Location within West Virginia Location within the United States
- Coordinates: 38°41′10″N 81°28′44″W
- Country: United States
- State: West Virginia
- County: Roane
- Elevation: 712 ft (217 m)
- Time zone: UTC-5 (Eastern (EST))
  - Summer (DST): UTC-4 (EDT)
- ZIP code: 25246
- Area codes: 304 & 681
- GNIS feature ID: 1539975

Harmony is an unincorporated community in Roane County, West Virginia, United States. Harmony is 10.5 miles (16.9 km) southwest of Spencer.

The community took its name from a local church.
