= Harmony School, School District No. 53 =

- Harmony School, School District #53
- U.S. National Register of Historic Places
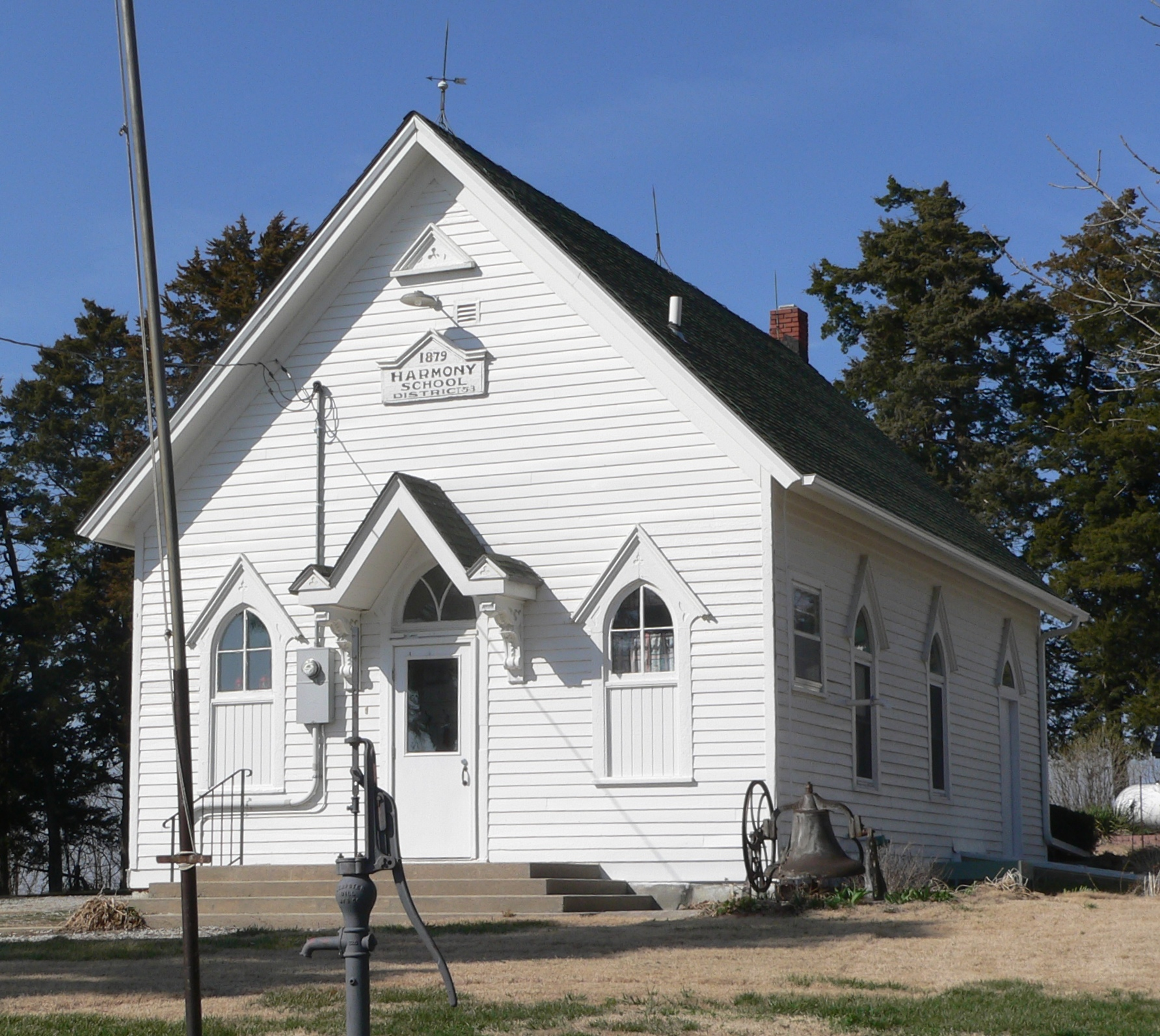
- Harmony School, seen from the southeast.

- Location within Nebraska Location within the United States
- Nearest city: Nebraska City, Nebraska
- Coordinates: 40°33′8.6″N 95°52′19.7″W
- Built: 1879
- Architectural style: Carpenter Gothic
- MPS: School Buildings in Nebraska MPS
- NRHP reference No.: 05000723
- Added to NRHP: July 22, 2005

Harmony School, School District #53, built in 1879, is an historic Carpenter Gothic-style country one-room schoolhouse located in rural Otoe County, Nebraska, United States, near Nebraska City. The building was used for its intended purpose until 1997 when it was closed. It is now privately owned.

On July 22, 2005, Harmony School was added to the National Register of Historic Places.
