= Harmony Township =

Harmony Township may refer to the following places in the United States:

- Harmony Township, Hancock County, Illinois
- Harmony Township, Posey County, Indiana
- Harmony Township, Union County, Indiana
- Harmony Township, Stevens County, Kansas
- Harmony Township, Fillmore County, Minnesota
- Harmony Township, Washington County, Missouri
- Harmony Township, New Jersey
- Harmony Township, North Dakota
- Harmony Township, Clark County, Ohio
- Harmony Township, Morrow County, Ohio
- Harmony Township, Beaver County, Pennsylvania
- Harmony Township, Forest County, Pennsylvania
- Harmony Township, Susquehanna County, Pennsylvania
- Harmony Township, Edmunds County, South Dakota, in Edmunds County, South Dakota
- Harmony Township, Jerauld County, South Dakota
- Harmony Township, Spink County, South Dakota
