= The Spiritual Harmonizers =

- Origin: Richmond, Virginia
- Genres: Urban contemporary gospel, Christian, R&B
- Instrument: A cappella
- Years active: 1999 – present
- Members: James Lewis (leads); Alton Jones; Alejandro Ortiz (leads); Robert "Doc" Dockery (bass); Lewis Hatcher (leads and falsetto); Brandon Lewis; L. J. Lewis

The Spiritual Harmonizers is an urban contemporary gospel group, made up of current and retired postal employees from Richmond, Virginia, United States of America. The group reached national popularity after performing on America's Got Talent in 2009. The group has seven members and currently performs in churches and other venues in Richmond and along the mid-Atlantic coast of the United States.

== Background ==
Originator James "Leon" Lewis says the group came together in the late 1990s when he was singing, a cappella, in the locker room at the post office in Richmond, and a co-worker a few lockers over picked up the tune. Soon other co-workers would join the group during work breaks or after hours, providing new harmonies.

The group has now grown to seven and includes Lewis (leads), Alton Jones, Michael Ellis, Robert "Doc" Dockery (bass), Lewis Hatcher (leads and falsetto), Brandon Lewis and L.J. Lewis. Brandon and L.J. are Leon Lewis' sons.

== Musical career ==
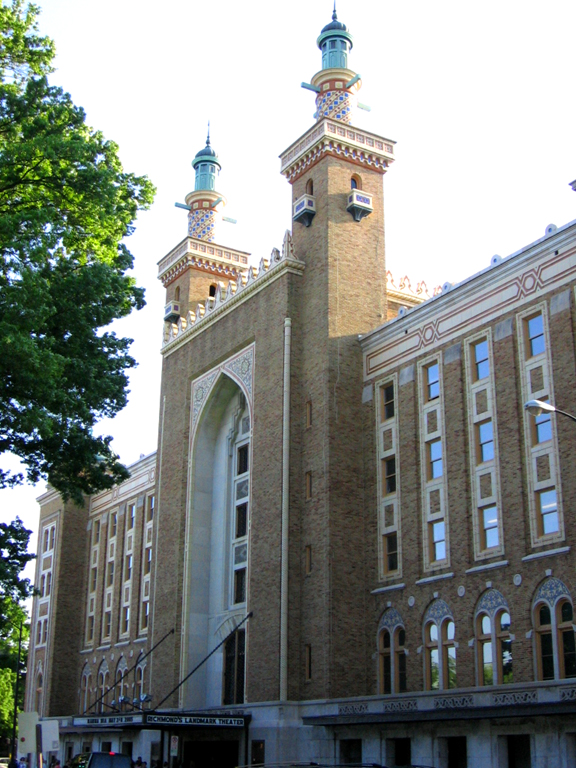
Landmark Theater, Richmond, Virginia

The group generally performs at weddings, reunions and churches local to the Richmond area. In August 2004, the Spiritual Harmonizers entered "the Gospel Explosion Showcase" at the Landmark Theater in Richmond, and won the grand prize by finishing first. In 2006 the group performed in Washington, D.C., at the investiture of Yverne Pat Moore, the first black Postmaster of Washington, D.C. They have performed at the same venues with other gospel acts such as Yolanda Adams and Luther Barnes. In July 2009, The Spiritual Harmonizers impressed the judges of America's Got Talent (season 4) with their a cappella rendition of the Boyz II Men hit "It's So Hard to Say Goodbye to Yesterday". Although the judges ostensibly passed the group "on to the next round", they were cut from the show and sent home without any other performances on the July 28, 2009 episode. The YouTube video of their performance got more than 20,000 hits within a week after the show.

The group recorded a CD in 2000 called Up in Faith and plans to release a second in 2009 featuring its America's Got Talent success. Demand for the groups's appearances has also increased ten-fold since their television appearance.

On September 13, 2009, between 5pm and 11pm PST, the Spiritual Harmonizers sang live during the Chabad Telethon in Los Angeles, California. The telethon was seen by an international audience of more than 2 million people.

== Other spiritual harmonizers ==
In addition to the postal workers in Richmond, the name "Spiritual Harmonizers" has also been used by singing groups in Mississippi, Illinois, northern Virginia, Lake Charles, Louisiana, Little Rock, Arkansas, Pine Bluff, Arkansas, Quincy, Florida and Sacramento, California.
