= Harmonic (disambiguation) =

Harmonic usually refers to the frequency components of a time-varying signal, such as a musical note.

== Mathematics, science and engineering ==
- Harmonic (mathematics), a number of concepts in mathematics
- Harmonic analysis, representing signals by superposition of basic waves
- Harmonic oscillator, a concept in classical mechanics
- Simple harmonic motion, a concept in classical mechanics
- Harmonic distortion, a measurement of signal distortion
- Harmonics (electrical power)
- Harmonic series (mathematics), a divergent infinite series
- Harmonic tremor, a rhythmic earthquake which may indicate volcanic activity

== Music ==
- String harmonic, a string instrument playing technique
- Artificial harmonic, a string instrument playing technique
- Enharmonic, a "spelling" issue in music
- Harmonic series (music), the series of overtones (or partials) present in a musical note, or the vibrational modes of a string or an air column
- Scale of harmonics, a musical scale based on harmonic nodes of a string
- The Harmonics, a rock a cappella group from Stanford University
- Harmony, the musical use of simultaneous pitches, or chords
- Inharmonicity, the degree of overtones' departure from integral multiples of the fundamental frequency
- Overtone, any resonant frequency higher than the fundamental frequency

== Other uses ==
- Harmonic (color), a relationship between three colors
- Harmonic Convergence, a New Age astrological term
- "Harmonics", the twelfth movement of Mike Oldfield's Tubular Bells 2003 album
- Harmonic Inc., a video infrastructure product company, headquartered in San Jose, California
- Harmonic (company), an artificial intelligence-based mathematics company

== See also ==
- Harmonix, a video game development company
