= Aurajoki =

Coordinates: 60°39′44″N 22°35′27″E

Aura River, Aurajoki
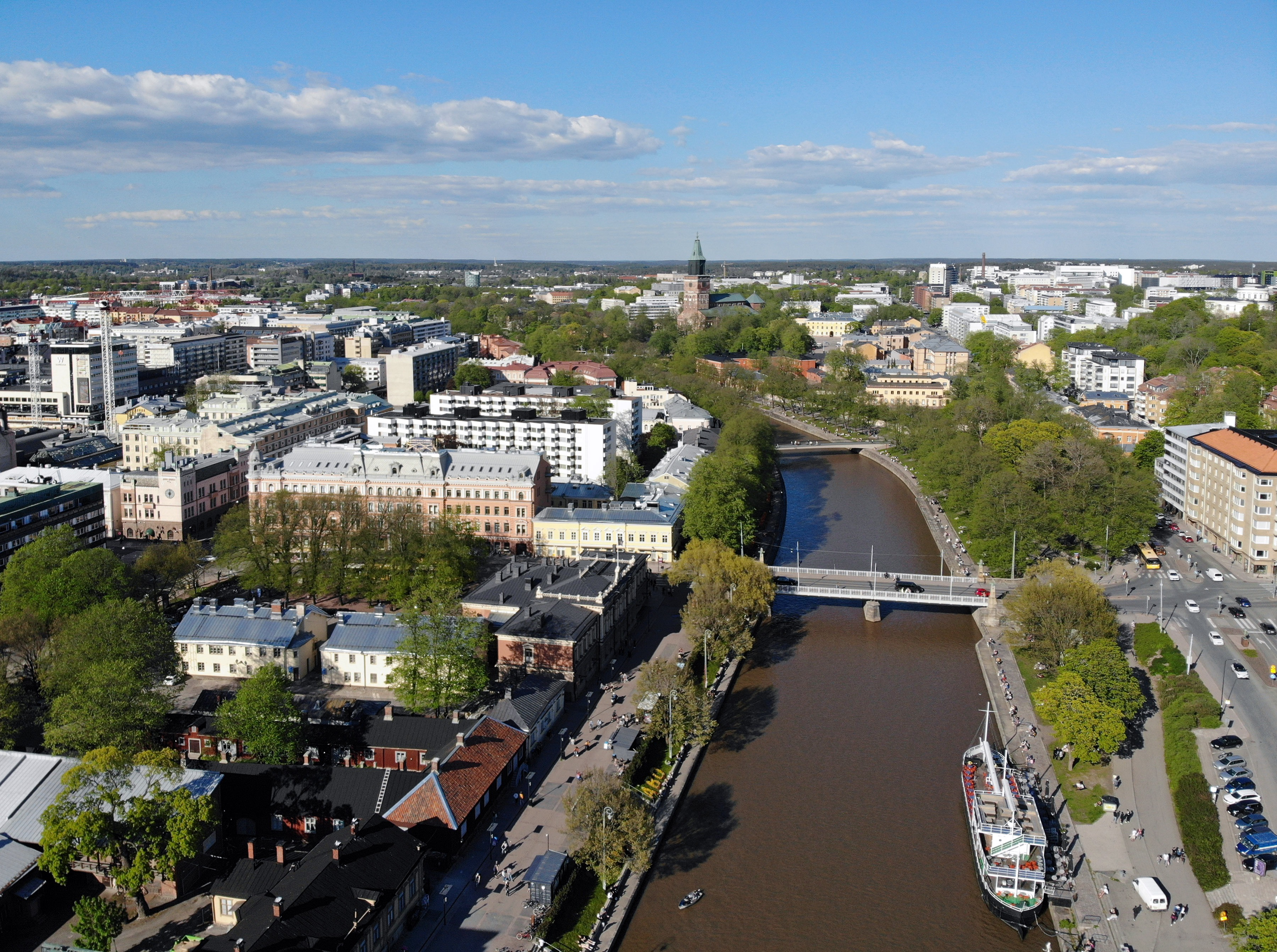
- Aurajoki in central Turku

Location
- Country: Finland

Physical characteristics
- Source
  - location: Oripää
- Mouth
  - location: Turku
- Length: 70 km (43 mi)
- Basin size: 885 km^{2} (342 sq mi)
- Discharge
  - average: 7 m^{3}/s (250 cu ft/s)

Aura River, in Finnish Aurajoki ([ˈɑu̯rɑˌjoki]; Swedish Aura å), is a river in south-western Finland. It originates in Oripää, and flows through Pöytyä, Aura, Lieto, and ultimately the city of Turku before discharging into the Archipelago Sea. The total length of the river is about 70 kilometres (43 mi), and it contains eleven rapids, the biggest of which is Nautelankoski at Lieto. The reserve tap water for Turku Region is drawn from Aurajoki, the city's secondary waterworks being situated by the Halinen rapids.

The waters of the Aurajoki are brown. Its condition has been improving since the 1970s and Aurajoki is now clean enough to support salmon.

The banks of the river have been inhabited for at least 6,000 years. The area is notable for the cultural heritage in Finland. The archdiocese of Finland has been situated near the river since the thirteenth century.

== Etymology ==
There several theories for the origin of the name Aura. The most widely accepted explanation traces the name back to an Old Scandinavian word, *āþra, 'waterway'. This word corresponds to the modern Swedish åder, which means 'vein' or 'artery' but can also refer to a watercourse. Another prominent theory connects the name to the Finnish word aura, 'plough', which may have been a descriptive name for one of the rapids in the river.

Other theories have also been put forward over the years. These include a connection to the Old West Norse word aurr, meaning 'gravel' or 'sand'; a link to an East-Baltic Finnish word aura meaning 'haze' or 'steam', which could have described the fog in the river valley or the spray from its rapids; and a suggestion that the name might derive from a Finnish short form of the personal name Abraham.

Reijo Solantie has suggested that Aurajoki derives from a Sámi name Oarrijohka, 'Squirrel River'.

== Gallery ==
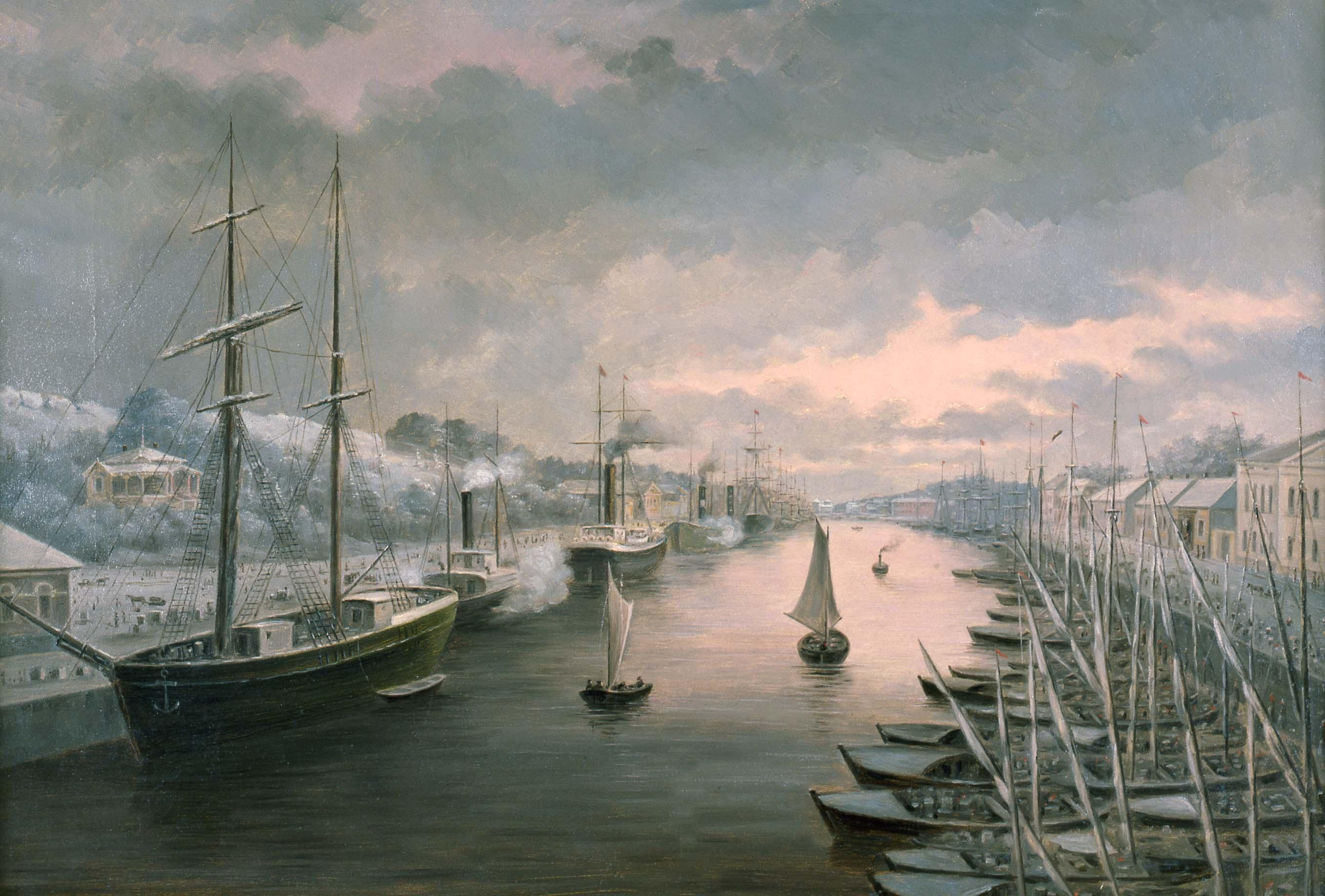
Wintery View Downstream from Aura Bridge by Johan Jakob Reinberg, c. 1880

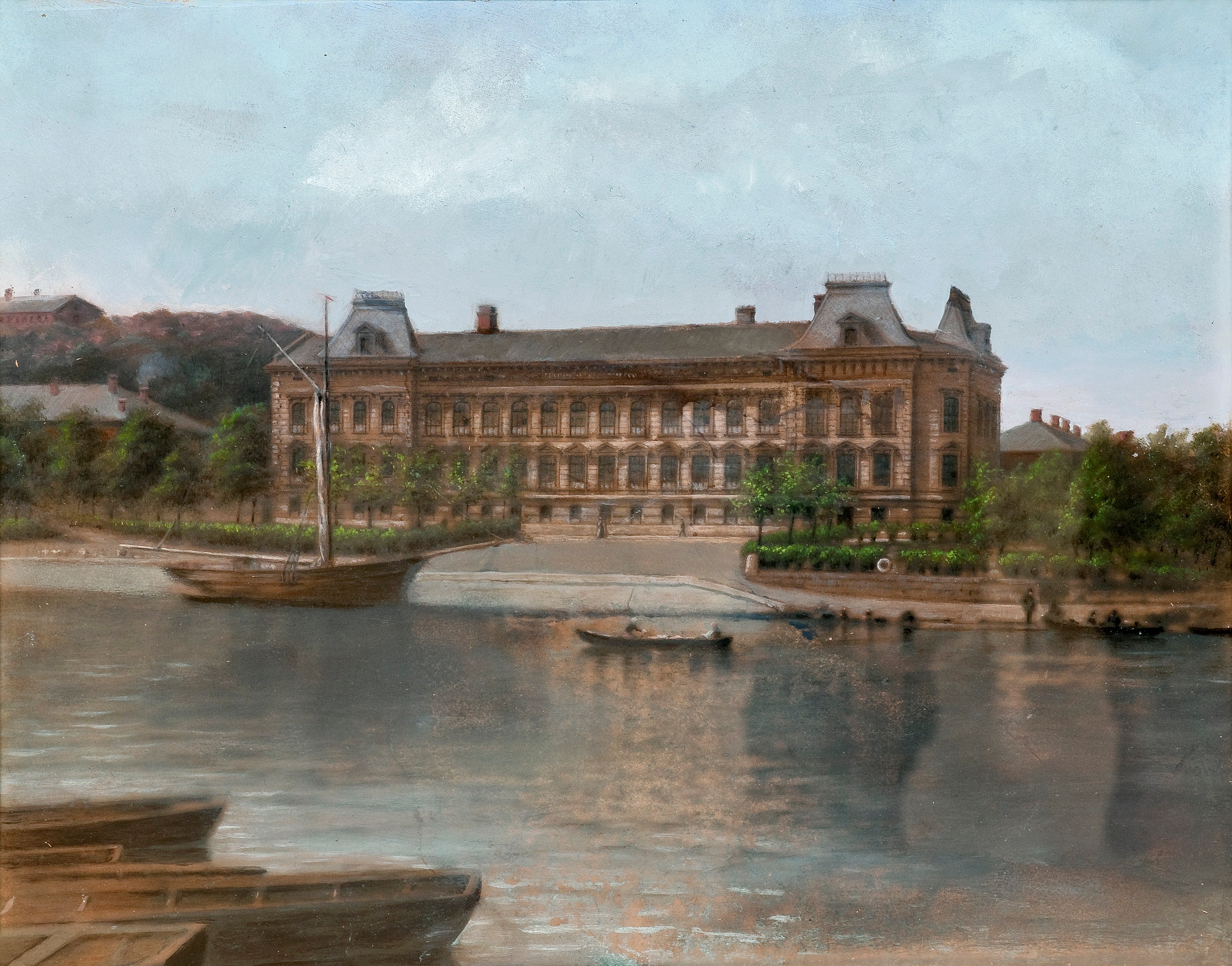
View of Turku by Reinberg in 1893

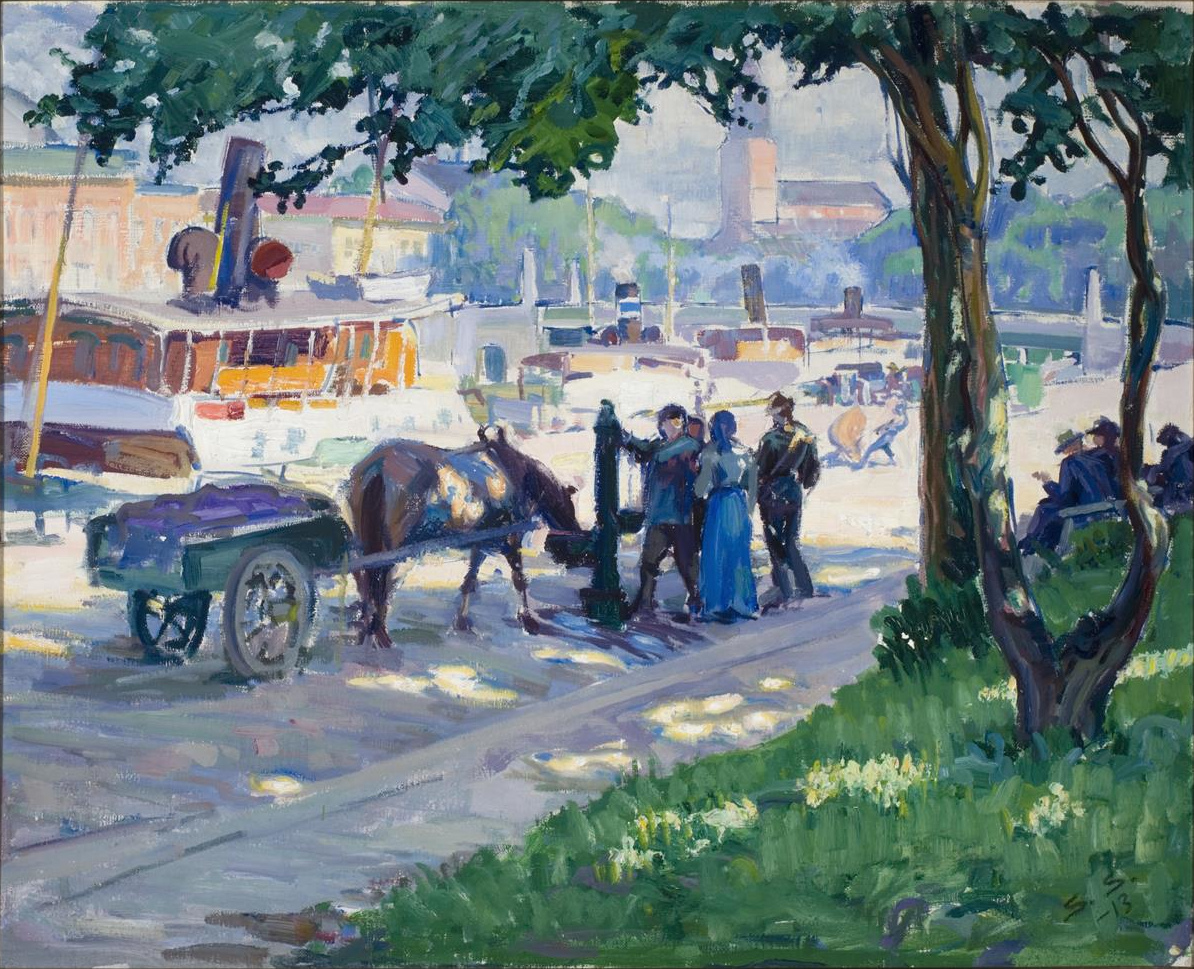
View from the Bank of Aura River by Santeri Salokivi in 1913

== See also ==
- Aura, Finland
