= The Garden of Sinners: A Study in Murder – Part 2 =

2009 animated film directed by Shinsuke Takizama

- Directed by: Shinsuke Takizawa
- Screenplay by: Masaki Hiramatsu
- Story by: Kinoko Nasu
- Based on: The Garden of Sinners by Kinoko Nasu
- Produced by: Atsuhiro Iwakami; Hikaru Kondo
- Starring: Maaya Sakamoto; Kenichi Suzumura; Sōichirō Hoshi
- Music by: Yuki Kajiura; Kalafina
- Production company: ufotable
- Distributed by: Aniplex
- Release date: August 8, 2009
- Running time: 121 minutes
- Country: Japan
- Language: Japanese

The Garden of Sinners: A Study in Murder – Part 2 (空の境界 第七章 殺人考察（後）, Kara no Kyōkai Dai-Nanashō: Satsujin Kōsatsu (Go)) is a 2009 Japanese animated film produced by ufotable based on The Garden of Sinners novels by Kinoko Nasu. It is the seventh installment in the series, preceded by Oblivion Recording (2008) and followed by a sequel Future Gospel (2013). Chronologically, the events that occur in The Garden of Sinners: A Study in Murder – Part 2 are the eighth in the timeline of the series.

== Plot ==
In February 1999, set after the sixth installment, Oblivion Recording, a new spate of ferocious murders, that share a disturbing resemblance to the string of homicides in 1995, began.

Set after Oblivion Recording, a new spate of ferocious murders has caught the eye of both Shiki and Daisuke, Mikiya's cousin who investigated the murders before. Shiki wanders the back alleys of the business district, searching for the murderer and avoiding attacks by local thugs while Mikiya becomes more and more worried about her, beginning his own investigation that takes him down a path populated by drug pushers and prostitutes. The perpetrator, Lio Shirazumi, finds Shiki first but loses an arm in the resulting scuffle. While fleeing, he discovers Mikiya in his apartment which has become a madman's shrine to Shiki. Mikiya tries to convince Lio that he can be saved, but he refuses and leaves. Shiki is captured and tortured by Lio as she refuses to kill him, Mikiya arrives at the spot but fails to stop Lio and ends up injured. Shiki kills Lio as he told her that he killed Mikiya.

In flashbacks, it is shown what happened to Mikiya and Shiki in the last part of the second installment A Study in Murder, Part 1 which led to her being hospitalized as shown in the fourth installment The Hollow Shrine.

== Cast ==
- Maaya Sakamoto as Shiki Ryougi
- Kenichi Suzumura as Mikiya Kokutou
- Sōichirō Hoshi as Lio Shirazumi
- Takako Honda as Touko Aozaki
- Hiroki Tōchi as Daisuke Akimi
- Kenji Takahashi as Gakuto
- Yūko Kaida as Otoko Hotaruzuka
- Jouji Nakata as Souren Araya
- Ayumi Fujimura as Azaka Kokutou
- Tamio Oki as Shiki's grandfather

== Notes ==
1.This is a collective pseudonym for several ufotable directors.
