= The Garden of Sinners: The Hollow Shrine =

2008 film by Teiichi Takiguchi

- DVD cover
- Directed by: Teiichi Takiguchi
- Screenplay by: Masaki Hiramatsu
- Story by: Kinoko Nasu
- Based on: The Garden of Sinners by Kinoko Nasu
- Produced by: Atsuhiro Iwakami; Hikaru Kondo
- Starring: Maaya Sakamoto; Kenichi Suzumura; Takako Honda
- Music by: Yuki Kajiura; Kalafina
- Production company: ufotable
- Distributed by: Aniplex
- Release date: May 24, 2008
- Running time: 45 minutes
- Country: Japan
- Language: Japanese

The Garden of Sinners: The Hollow Shrine (空の境界 第四章 伽藍の洞, Kara no Kyōkai Dai-Yonshō: Garan no Dō) is a 2008 Japanese animated film produced by ufotable based on The Garden of Sinners novels by Kinoko Nasu. It is the fourth installment in the series, preceded by Remaining Sense of Pain (2008) and followed by Paradox Spiral (2008). Chronologically, the events that occur in The Garden of Sinners: The Hollow Shrine are the second in the timeline of the series.

== Plot ==
Following the events in the second installment, A Study in Murder, Part 1, Shiki is sent to the hospital for causes revealed in the seventh installment, A Study in Murder, Part 2.

This part of the series is about Shiki's experiences within the void with her male counterpart, SHIKI, and the resulting ability to 'perceive' and 'touch' the 'death' of things in the form of cracks that ran everywhere she looked.

It shows how Toko, Mikiya's employer, and Shiki met as she counsels her about the 'Mystic Eyes of Death Perception'.

It also gives a glimpse of how Mikiya lived two years of his life while Shiki was comatose.

Post credits shows a mysterious man in a dark trench coat visiting three people: Kirie Fujo, Fujino Asagami, and a blood-stained guy.

== Cast ==
- Maaya Sakamoto as Shiki Ryougi
- Kenichi Suzumura as Mikiya Kokutou
- Takako Honda as Touko Aozaki
- Jouji Nakata as Souren Araya
- Rie Tanaka as Kirie Fujou
- Mamiko Noto as Fujino Asagami
- Sōichirō Hoshi as Lio Shirazumi
