= Ufotable =

Japanese animation studio

Ufotable, Inc.

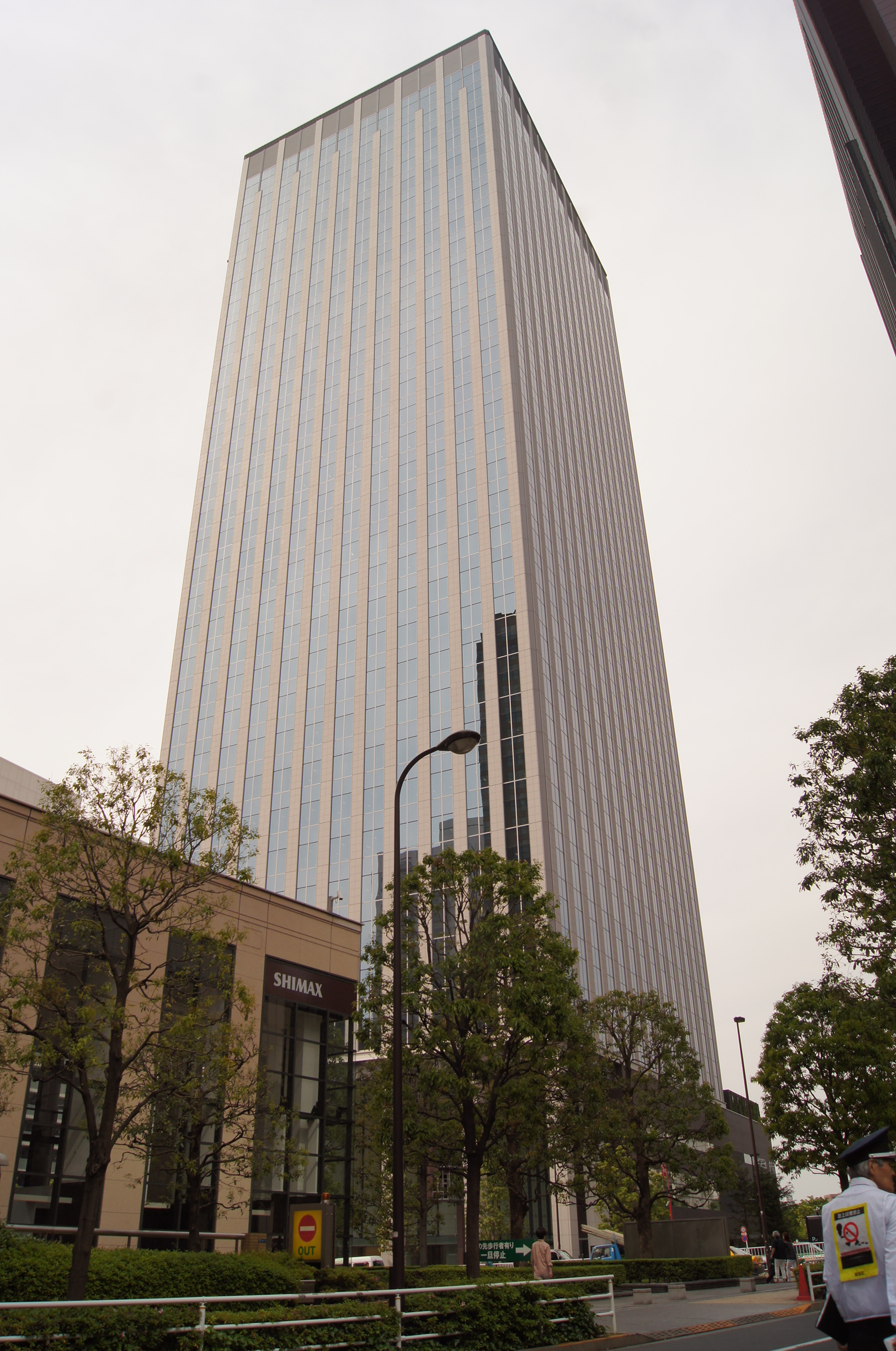
- Shinjuku Front Tower, where Ufotable's head office is located
- Native name: ユーフォーテーブル有限会社
- Romanized name: Yūfōtēburu yūgen-gaisha
- Type: Yūgen gaisha
- Industry: Japanese animation
- Founded: October 2000
- Founder: Hikaru Kondō
- Headquarters: Kitashinjuku, Shinjuku, Tokyo, Japan
- Key people: Hikaru Kondō (president)
- Number of employees: 256 (as of March 2024)
- Subsidiaries: Ufotable Tokushima (2009–present)
- Website: www.ufotable.com

Ufotable, Inc. (Japanese: ユーフォーテーブル有限会社, Hepburn: Yūfōtēburu yūgen-gaisha) is a Japanese animation studio founded in October 2000 by former Telecom Animation Film producer Hikaru Kondō and located in Shinjuku, Tokyo.

A hallmark seen in many of their works (Ninja Nonsense, Futakoi Alternative, Coyote Ragtime Show, Gakuen Utopia Manabi Straight!, Tales of Symphonia, The Garden of Sinners) is a claymation sequence.

They have had a long relationship with Type-Moon, having produced adaptations of their works such as Fate/Zero, Fate/stay night: Unlimited Blade Works, and The Garden of Sinners, as well as Bandai Namco Entertainment, for whom they have produced an opening animation and cutscenes for many of their games, primarily in the Tales and God Eater series.

In 2025, the studio produced the highest-grossing anime film of all time, Demon Slayer: Kimetsu no Yaiba – The Movie: Infinity Castle. The film surpassed the studio's previous record-holder, Demon Slayer: Kimetsu no Yaiba – The Movie: Mugen Train (2020), which was the first non-Hollywood production to top the annual global box office.

== Productions ==
=== Anime television series ===
Year	Title	Network	Director(s)	Eps.	Note(s)	Refs.
2002–2003	Weiß Kreuz Glühen	Kids Station	Hitoyuki Matsui	13	Sequel to Weiß Kreuz, produced by Magic Bus.	
2003	Dokkoida?!	JAITS	Hitoyuki Matsui; Takuya Nonaka	12	Adaptation of the light novel series by Taro Achi.	
2004	Ninja Nonsense	CBC	Hitoyuki Matsui	12	Adaptation of the manga series by Ryoichi Koga.	
2005	Futakoi Alternative	TV Aichi	Takayuki Hirao	13	Original work. Co-production with Feel. and Studio Flag.	
2006	Coyote Ragtime Show	Chiba TV	Takuya Nonaka	12	Original work.	
2007	Gakuen Utopia Manabi Straight!	TV Tokyo	Team Manabibeya	12	Original work.	
2011–2012	Fate/Zero	Tokyo MX	Ei Aoki	25	Adaptation of the light novel series by Gen Urobuchi. Prequel to Fate/Stay Night.	
2013	The Garden of Sinners	Tokyo MX	Various	13	TV adaptation of the first four and seventh The Garden of Sinners films.	
2014–2015	Fate/stay night: Unlimited Blade Works	Tokyo MX	Takahiro Miura	25	Based on a visual novel by Type-Moon.	
2015–2016	God Eater	Tokyo MX	Takayuki Hirao	13	Based on a video game by Bandai Namco.	
2016–2017	Tales of Zestiria the X	Tokyo MX	Haruo Sotozaki	26	Based on a video game by Bandai Namco.	
2017	Katsugeki/Touken Ranbu	Tokyo MX	Toshiyuki Shirai	13	Based on a browser video game by Nitroplus.	
2019	Demon Slayer: Kimetsu no Yaiba	Tokyo MX	Haruo Sotozaki	26	Adaptation of the manga series by Koyoharu Gotouge.	
2021	Demon Slayer: Kimetsu no Yaiba – Mugen Train Arc	Fuji TV, Tokyo MX	Haruo Sotozaki	7	Sequel to Demon Slayer: Kimetsu no Yaiba and TV adaptation of Demon Slayer: Kimetsu no Yaiba – The Movie: Mugen Train.	
2021–2022	Demon Slayer: Kimetsu no Yaiba – Entertainment District Arc	Fuji TV, Tokyo MX	Haruo Sotozaki	11	Sequel to Demon Slayer: Kimetsu no Yaiba – The Movie: Mugen Train.	
2023	Demon Slayer: Kimetsu no Yaiba – Swordsmith Village Arc	Fuji TV, Tokyo MX	Haruo Sotozaki	11	Sequel to Demon Slayer: Kimetsu no Yaiba – Entertainment District Arc	
2024	Demon Slayer: Kimetsu no Yaiba – Hashira Training Arc	Fuji TV, Tokyo MX	Haruo Sotozaki	8	Sequel to Demon Slayer: Kimetsu no Yaiba – Swordsmith Village Arc	
TBA	Untitled Genshin Impact series	TBA	TBA	TBA	Based on a video game by miHoYo. Co-production with HoYoverse.	

=== OVAs/ONAs ===
Year	Title	Director(s)	Eps.	Note(s)	Refs.
2004	Tristia of the Deep-Blue Sea	Hitoyuki Matsui	2	Based on a visual novel by Kogado Studio.	
2007	Tales of Symphonia The Animation: Sylvarant Episode	Haruo Sotozaki	4	Based on a video game by Bandai Namco.	
2007	Gakuen Utopia Manabi Straight!	Team Manabibeya	1	A special episode of Gakuen Utopia Manabi Straight!.	
2009	God Eater Prologue	Takayuki Hirao	1	Serves as prequel to God Eater.	
2009	Toriko	Mitsuru Obunai	1	Based on a manga series by Mitsutoshi Shimabukuro.	
2009–2010	Yawarakame	—N/a	26	Original work.	
2010–2011	Tales of Symphonia: The Animation Tethe'alla Episode	Haruo Sotozaki	4	Sequel to Tales of Symphonia The Animation: Sylvarant Episode.	
2010–2012	Yuri Seijin Naoko-san	Tetsuya Takeuchi	2	Based on a manga by Kashmir.	
2011	The Garden of Sinners: Epilogue	Hikaru Kondo	1	Serves as an epilogue to The Garden of Sinners film series.	
2011–2012	Tales of Symphonia: The Animation The United World Episode	Haruo Sotozaki	3	Sequel to Tales of Symphonia: The Animation Tethe'alla Episode.	
2012	Minori Scramble!	Takuya Nonaka	1	Adaptation of the manga series by Mikage Chihaya.	
2012	Gyo: Tokyo Fish Attack	Takayuki Hirao	1	Based on a manga by Junji Ito.	
2015	Fate/stay night: Unlimited Blade Works - sunny day	Takahiro Miura	1	An alternate ending to Fate/stay night: Unlimited Blade Works.	
2017	Fate/Grand Order x Himuro no Tenchi: 7-nin no Saikyō Ijin-hen	Takahiro Miura	1	Based on a manga series by Eiichirō Mashin.	
2018–2019	Today's Menu for the Emiya Family	Takahiro Miura; Tetsuto Satou	13	Adaptation of the manga series by TAa.	

=== Anime films ===
Year	Title	Director(s)	Note(s)	Refs.
2007	The Garden of Sinners: Overlooking View	Ei Aoki	Adaptation of the light novel series by Kinoko Nasu, the 1st film in The Garden of Sinners film series.	
2007	The Garden of Sinners: A Study in Murder – Part 1	Takuya Nonaka	The 2nd film in The Garden of Sinners film series.	
2008	The Garden of Sinners: Remaining Sense of Pain	Mitsuru Obunai	The 3rd film in The Garden of Sinners film series.	
2008	The Garden of Sinners: The Hollow Shrine	Teiichi Takiguchi	The 4th film in The Garden of Sinners film series.	
2008	The Garden of Sinners: Paradox Spiral	Takayuki Hirao	The 5th film in The Garden of Sinners film series.	
2008	The Garden of Sinners: Oblivion Recording	Takahiro Miura	The 6th film in The Garden of Sinners film series.	
2009	The Garden of Sinners: A Study in Murder – Part 2	Shinsuke Takizawa	The 7th film in The Garden of Sinners film series.	
2011	Sakura no Ondo	Takayuki Hirao	Original work.	
2013	The Garden of Sinners: Future Gospel	Tomonori Sudō	The 8th and final film in The Garden of Sinners film series.	
2013	Majocco Shimai no Yoyo to Nene	Takayuki Hirao	Based on a manga by Hirarin.	
2014	Tales of Zestiria: Dawn of the Shepherd	Haruo Sotozaki	Based on a video game by Bandai Namco.	
2017	Fate/stay night: Heaven's Feel I. presage flower	Tomonori Sudō	Based on a visual novel by Type-Moon, the 1st film in Fate/stay night: Heaven's Feel film series.	
2019	Fate/stay night: Heaven's Feel II. lost butterfly	Tomonori Sudō	The 2nd film in Fate/stay night: Heaven's Feel film series.	
2019	Kimetsu no Yaiba: Kyōdai no Kizuna	Haruo Sotozaki	Compilation of Demon Slayer: Kimetsu no Yaiba first five episodes.	
2020	Fate/stay night: Heaven's Feel III. spring song	Tomonori Sudō	The 3rd and final film in Fate/stay night: Heaven's Feel film series.	
2020	Demon Slayer: Kimetsu no Yaiba – The Movie: Mugen Train	Haruo Sotozaki	Sequel to Demon Slayer: Kimetsu no Yaiba.	
2023	Demon Slayer: Kimetsu no Yaiba – To the Swordsmith Village	Haruo Sotozaki	Compilation of Demon Slayer: Kimetsu no Yaiba – Entertainment District Arc final two episodes and first episode of Demon Slayer: Kimetsu no Yaiba – Swordsmith Village Arc.	
2024	Demon Slayer: Kimetsu no Yaiba – To the Hashira Training	Haruo Sotozaki	Compilation of Demon Slayer: Kimetsu no Yaiba – Swordsmith Village Arc final episode and first episode of Demon Slayer: Kimetsu no Yaiba – Hashira Training Arc.	
2025	Demon Slayer: Kimetsu no Yaiba – The Movie: Infinity Castle	Haruo Sotozaki	Sequel to Demon Slayer: Kimetsu no Yaiba – Swordsmith Village Arc. First film of Infinity Castle planned trilogy.	
2026	Witch on the Holy Night	Masashi Takeuchi	Based on a visual novel by Type-Moon.	
TBA	Untitled Katsugeki/Touken Ranbu film	TBA	Related to Katsugeki/Touken Ranbu.	

=== Video games ===
Year	Title	Publisher	Note(s)	Refs.
2004	Symphonic Rain	Kogado Studio	Background arts.	
2005	Summon Night EX-These: Yoake no Tsubasa	Banpresto	Opening animation.	
2006	Disgaea 2	Nippon Ichi Software	Opening animation.	
2007	Dragon Shadow Spell	Flight-Plan	Opening animation.	
2008	Disgaea 3	Nippon Ichi Software	Opening animation.	
2010	God Eater	Bandai Namco Entertainment	Opening animation/cutscenes.	
2010	Summon Night Gran-These: Horobi no Tsurugi to Yakusoku no Kishi	Bandai Namco Entertainment	Opening animation/cutscenes.	
2011	Black Rock Shooter: The Game	Imageepoch	Opening animation.	
2011	Tales of Xillia	Bandai Namco	Opening animation/cutscenes.	
2012	Tales of Xillia 2	Bandai Namco	Opening animation/cutscenes.	
2012	Fate/stay night [Réalta Nua]	Kadokawa Games	Opening animations.	
2013	Summon Night 5	Bandai Namco	Opening animation/cutscenes.	
2013	God Eater 2	Bandai Namco	Opening animation/cutscenes.	
2014	Natural Doctrine	Kadokawa Games	Character designs.	
2014	Fate/hollow ataraxia	Type-Moon	Opening animation.	
2015	Tales of Zestiria	Bandai Namco	Opening animation/cutscenes.	
2015	God Eater 2: Rage Burst	Bandai Namco	Opening animation/cutscenes.	
2016	Tales of Berseria	Bandai Namco	Opening animation/cutscenes.	
2017	God Eater Online	Bandai Namco	Opening animation.	
2018	God Eater Resonant Ops	Bandai Namco	Opening animation.	
2018	Dragalia Lost	Nintendo	Cutscenes/illustrations.	
2018	God Eater 3	Bandai Namco	Opening animation/cutscenes.	
2019	Code Vein	Bandai Namco	Opening animation.	
2021	Tsukihime - A piece of blue glass moon	Aniplex	Opening animation.	
2021	Tales of Arise	Bandai Namco	Opening animation/cutscenes.	
2021	Demon Slayer: Kimetsu no Yaiba – The Hinokami Chronicles	Aniplex	Key illustration.	
2025	Demon Slayer: Kimetsu no Yaiba – The Hinokami Chronicles 2	Aniplex	Key illustration.	

=== Other productions ===
- Bang!Bang!Bang! (2019) – music video for song by Idolish7 group ŹOOĻ.
- Girls' Work– Original work. Co-production with Type-Moon. Announced in 2016, never produced.

== Tax evasion scandal ==
In March 2019, it was reported that a search was performed on Ufotable's offices due to alleged tax evasion. The next month, it was reported that Ufotable owed ¥400 million in taxes. In June 2020, both the studio and company founder and president Hikaru Kondo were charged with violating the Corporation Tax Act and Consumption Tax Act by failing to pay ¥139 million (about US$1.28 million) in taxes. The studio published a public statement apologizing for their actions. In July 2021, Kondo was formally indicted with evading ¥137 million (about US$1.24 million) in taxes by the special investigation department of the Tokyo Public Prosecutor's Office. Ufotable acknowledged the indictment and gave assurance that the company had already filed a corrected tax return and paid the appropriate amount. In September 2021, Kondo admitted to evading ¥138 million in taxes at a preliminary hearing by the Tokyo District Court. The company allegedly hid about ¥441 million (about US$4 million) in income. In response to questioning by the prosecution, Kondo said, "The only profits coming from the studio come from the cafe business and merchandise sales, and if those were to disappear, we wouldn't be able to pay the staff's salaries or production costs, so I wanted to secure some cash just in case something happened." (Note: Although the Japanese animation industry was in the midst of an animation bubble at the time, the fees offered to studios by clients such as TV stations, movie studios, and publishers had risen somewhat, but remained low. Therefore, every production would always end up in the red, and Ufotable also had to make up for this with profits from its side business. Many studios without intellectual property rights could make money from merchandise if they had a hit, but if they did not, they could not pay their staff or went bankrupt. As for Netflix, which was seen as the savior of Japanese anime, if Netflix fully invested in the studios, they could receive double or triple the fees, but in return, the studios had to hand over the intellectual property rights to Netflix and could no longer sell merchandise or video software for their works.) In November 2021, it was reported prosecutors were seeking a 20-month prison sentence for Kondo. The court delivered a verdict on December 10, 2021. Kondo was sentenced to 20 months in prison, but the sentence was suspended for three years.
