= The Garden of Sinners: Future Gospel =

2013 animated film directed by Tomonori Sudo

- Directed by: Tomonori Sudo
- Screenplay by: Akira Hiyama
- Story by: Kinoko Nasu
- Based on: The Garden of Sinners by Kinoko Nasu
- Produced by: Hikaru Kondo
- Starring: Maaya Sakamoto; Kenichi Suzumura; Yuka Iguchi; Akira Ishida; Hisako Kanemoto
- Cinematography: Yūichi Terao
- Music by: Yuki Kajiura; Kalafina
- Production company: Ufotable
- Distributed by: Aniplex
- Release date: September 28, 2013
- Running time: 88 minutes
- Country: Japan
- Language: Japanese

The Garden of Sinners: Future Gospel (空の境界 未来福音, Kara no Kyōkai: Mirai Fukuin) is a 2013 Japanese animated film produced by Ufotable based on The Garden of Sinners novels by Kinoko Nasu. It is a sequel of the series, preceded by A Study in Murder – Part 2 (2009). The film plays in two parts: Möbius Ring and Möbius Link.

== Plot ==
=== Möbius Ring ===
Ring takes place in August 1998. After he saves the life of a bystander whose death she happened to predict, Shizune Seo speaks to Mikiya Kokuto in a cafe about her own ability to foresee the future. Possessing the "Prediction" type of precognition, she has to suffer the pain of seeing the death of loved ones twice, as well as the guilt of getting better grades than her peers even with no knowledge of the subject material. Kokuto explains to her that her ability is not as extraordinary as she thinks, and that it is more like an extension of the kind of prediction that ordinary humans can do based on current information. Seo leaves on a happy note after warning Kokuto of the misfortune that he would encounter with Shiki.

Mitsuru Kamekura, under the pseudonym of Meruka Kuramitsu, performs bombings-for-hire and succeeds every time. This is because he has the "Calculation" type of precognition, where he takes specific actions to ensure a specific future comes true. His right eye is able to foresee the future and his left eye shows the "path" that should be taken to achieve that future. Due to this ability, he falls under the impression that he is a slave to his own future. He performs bombings in order to achieve a future that even he cannot predict. When Shiki becomes a witness to one of his bombings, Mitsuru repeatedly attempts to kill her until she "kills" the vision of the future that he saw in his last attempt. This changes the future completely and Mitsuru's bomb unexpectedly goes off 5 minutes after the predicted time, allowing Shiki to catch him. Mitsuru is revealed to be a 14-year-old and Shiki lets him go after seeing that his right eye is of no use anymore. Mitsuru is forced to quit his bombing job and go to college.

Chronologically, the events that occur in Ring are the fourth in the timeline of the series.

=== Möbius Link ===
Link takes place in 2010. Ten years after the events of The Garden of Sinners, the debt-riddled Mitsuru is hired by Shiki, who has become the head of the Ryougi family, partly thanks to Mana Ryougi, Shiki and Kokuto's daughter, liking a children's picture book he wrote and published in the meantime. Remarking that Mana saved him from a miserable fate, he takes her to see the Mother of Mifune, an old street fortune teller who predicted both SHIKI and Shiki's future many years ago.

Chronologically, the events that occur in Link are the tenth in the timeline of the series.

== Cast ==
- Maaya Sakamoto as Shiki Ryougi
- Kenichi Suzumura as Mikiya Kokutou
- Yuka Iguchi as Shizune Seo
- Akira Ishida as Mitsuru Kamekura
- Hisako Kanemoto as Mana Ryougi
- Takako Honda as Touko Aozaki
- Hiroki Tōchi as Daisuke Akimi
- Ayumi Fujimura as Azaka Kokutou
- Saori Ōnishi as Naomi
- Kujira as Mother Mifune
