= The Garden of Sinners: Overlooking View =

2007 film by Ei Aoki

- Theatrical release poster
- Directed by: Ei Aoki
- Screenplay by: Masaki Hiramatsu
- Story by: Kinoko Nasu
- Based on: The Garden of Sinners by Kinoko Nasu
- Produced by: Atsuhiro Iwakami; Hikaru Kondo
- Starring: Maaya Sakamoto; Kenichi Suzumura; Takako Honda; Rie Tanaka
- Cinematography: Seiji Matsuda; Yūichi Terao
- Music by: Yuki Kajiura; Kalafina
- Production company: Ufotable
- Distributed by: Aniplex
- Release dates: December 1, 2007; July 13, 2013 (3D remake)
- Running time: 49 minutes
- Country: Japan
- Language: Japanese

The Garden of Sinners: Overlooking View (空の境界 第一章 俯瞰風景, Kara no Kyōkai Dai-Isshō: Fukan Fūkei) is a 2007 Japanese animated film produced by Ufotable based on The Garden of Sinners novels by Kinoko Nasu. It is the first installment in the series, followed by A Study in Murder – Part 1 (2007). Chronologically, the events that occur in The Garden of Sinners: Overlooking View are the fifth in the timeline of the series.

== Plot ==
Note: the events of the film are presented to the viewer in non-linear format. This section describes the events in chronological order.

In September 1998, taciturn Shiki Ryōgi lives alone in a barely-furbished apartment where she is routinely visited by a close friend, Mikiya Kokutō. One day, he visits her and offers Shiki strawberry-flavored Häagen-Dazs ice-cream. The two engage in friendly banter.

Later, Shiki discusses a series of suicides involving several high school girls with the magus Tōko Aozaki, head of Garan no Dou (伽藍の堂, Hollow Shrine), a detective agency (of which Shiki and Mikiya are employees) specializing in paranormal occurrences. Unusually, none of the deceased left a suicide note before jumping from atop the Fujō Building, a derelict building due for demolition. This prompts Garan no Dou to launch its own investigation, especially after Mikiya falls into a coma, which Tōko believes to be related to the suicides.

After finding the corpse of a fourth victim, Shiki witnesses nine ghostly figures floating above the Fujō Building. She enters the Fujō Building to further investigate where she enters combat with a ghostly entity. Shiki narrowly escapes with severe damage to her prosthetic arm. Shiki recuperates within Garan no Dou while her prosthesis is repaired by Tōko. After the death of a seventh victim, Shiki returns to the Fujō Building to confront the ghostly figures a second time. Shiki destroys the ghosts using her supernatural abilities. The final ghost continually curses at Shiki to commit suicide, who remains unfazed. The final ghost is destroyed by Shiki after she stabs it in the abdomen.

Elsewhere in the city at the same time, a terminally-ill girl named Kirie Fujo awakens in her hospital bed, where she is confronted by Tōko in person. It is revealed that Kirie had been using her supernatural abilities of astral projection and possession to lure bypassing girls to commit suicide at the Fujō Building. The final ghost was her astral projection and the rest were the spiritual remnants of the suicide victims. Mikiya's comatose state was due to his possession by her after she became infatuated with him. Tōko discusses the situation with Kirie at length, where she admits that her motive for the suicides was because she felt extreme loneliness due to her infirmity and possessed the girls with the intent of having them notice her. Kirie concludes that she has nothing left to live for, and expresses her desire to die after having experienced the destruction of her astral projection by Shiki. Later, she kills herself at the Fujō Building.

Shortly after, Mikiya awakens from his coma with little memory of the experience. He returns with Shiki to her apartment where they continue to banter, ending with Shiki blushing in embarrassment.

In the post-credits scene, while walking with Azaka Kokutō near the Fujō Building, Tōko remarks that Kirie Fujō probably could not fly that day.

== Cast ==
- Maaya Sakamoto as Shiki Ryougi
- Kenichi Suzumura as Mikiya Kokutou
- Takako Honda as Touko Aozaki
- Rie Tanaka as Kirie Fujou
- Ayumi Fujimura as Azaka Kokutou

== Reception ==
=== Critical response ===
The Garden of Sinners: Overlooking View received generally positive responses. Anime review website The Anime Review gave it a B. The film's atmosphere was praised: "... Overlooking View is not concerned with making sense. It is concerned with creating a vibe, and that it does well", and: "You can almost feel the decay in the architecture of the buildings, which have extravagant detail in spite of (or perhaps because of) their disintegration." However, the film's plot and pacing was criticised: "... I don't think there's any way to "get" it, at least not with the little bit that's given to us in the movie's 50-minute running time. And I certainly wouldn't recommend watching it when you're even the least bit sleepy, as the pacing is deliberate enough to send you into slumberland."
