= Seiko Yoshida =

Japanese voice actress (born 1986)

- 吉田 聖子
- Born: March 15, 1986 (age 40); Niigata Prefecture, Japan
- Occupation: Voice actress
- Years active: 2008–present
- Agent: Mausu Promotion

Seiko Yoshida (吉田 聖子, Yoshida Seiko; born March 15, 1986) is a Japanese voice actress affiliated with Mausu Promotion.

== Filmography ==
=== Television animation ===
2008

- Nijū Mensō no Musume as Spectator A (ep 5)

2009

- Umineko: When They Cry as Belphegor
- Tatakau Shisho as Ia Mira

2010

- Princess Jellyfish as Lina
- HeartCatch PreCure! as Toshiko Sakuma

2011

- I Don't Like You at All, Big Brother!! as Girl (ep 10)
- Naruto: Shippuden as Headman's Granddaughter (ep 195)
- Baka and Test: Summon the Beasts as 3rd grade girl A (ep 11)
- Blood-C as Woman (ep 5)
- Blade as Yati (ep 6)
- Manyū Hiken-chō as Kayo (ep 3)
- Puella Magi Madoka Magica as Kyōsuke Kamijō
- Level E as Announcer (ep 1); Demon King (ep 7); Robert's Wife (ep 11); Saki's Friend A (eps 8–9); Younger Brother (ep 4)

2012

- Another as Mizuno
- JoJo's Bizarre Adventure as Reporter (ep 11)
- Fate/Zero as Child (ep 19)
- Naruto: Shippuden as Ruka

2013

- Amnesia as Rika

2014

- Magic Kaito

2015

- The Testament of Sister New Devil as Zest

=== Theatrical animation ===
2008

- The Garden of Sinners: The Hollow Shrine as Nurse B
- The Garden of Sinners: Paradox Spiral as Newscaster

2012

- Puella Magi Madoka Magica Part 1: Beginnings as Kyōsuke Kamijō
- Puella Magi Madoka Magica Part 2: Eternal as Kyōsuke Kamijō

2013

- Puella Magi Madoka Magica New Feature: Rebellion as Kyōsuke Kamijō

=== ONA ===
2015

- Toki wa Meguru: Tokyo Station as Misaki

2022

- Tekken: Bloodline as Julia Chang

=== OVA ===
2012

- Kissxsis OVA as Health Committee Member (ep 7)

2018

- The Testament of Sister New Devil DEPARTURES as Zest

=== Video games ===
2008

- Cooking Mama: World Kitchen as David and Clara

2010

- Corpse Party as Tohko Kirisaki

2012

- Street Fighter X Tekken as Julia Chang
- Fire Emblem Awakening as Sayri and Noire

2015

- Criminal Girls 2: Party Favors as Tsukasa

2016

- Street Fighter V as Eliza
- The King of Fighters XIV as Leona Heidern

2017

- 100% Orange Juice as Suguri

2018

- The King of Fighters All Star as Leona Heidern
- SNK Heroines: Tag Team Frenzy as Leona Heidern
- Soulcalibur VI
- Azur Lane as Japanese aircraft carrier Jun'yo

2020

- Shinobi Master Senran Kagura: New Link as Leona Heidern

2022

- The King of Fighters XV as Leona Heidern
- Azur Lane as Junyou META

2024

- Another Code: Recollection as Emily Crusoe and Frannie Edward

=== Vomics ===
- Kekkai Sensen as Chain Sumeragi

=== Dubbing ===
- Piranha 3DD as Maddy (Danielle Panabaker)
