= The Garden of Sinners: Oblivion Recording =

2008 film directed by Takahiro Miura

- DVD cover
- Directed by: Takahiro Miura
- Screenplay by: Masaki Hiramatsu
- Story by: Kinoko Nasu
- Based on: The Garden of Sinners by Kinoko Nasu
- Produced by: Atsuhiro Iwakami; Hikaru Kondo
- Starring: Maaya Sakamoto; Ayumi Fujimura; Ryōtarō Okiayu; Nana Mizuki
- Music by: Yuki Kajiura; Kalafina
- Production company: ufotable
- Distributed by: Aniplex
- Release date: December 20, 2008
- Running time: 58 minutes
- Country: Japan
- Language: Japanese

The Garden of Sinners: Oblivion Recording (空の境界 第六章 忘却録音, Kara no Kyōkai Dai-Rokushō: Bōkyaku Rokuon) is a 2008 Japanese animated film produced by ufotable based on The Garden of Sinners novels by Kinoko Nasu. It is the sixth installment in the series, preceded by Paradox Spiral (2008) and followed by A Study in Murder – Part 2 (2009). Chronologically, the events that occur in The Garden of Sinners: Oblivion Recording are the seventh in the timeline of the series.

== Plot ==
The film begins with an introduction from Kokuto Azaka on who she is and how she plans to win Mikiya over as her lover despite the presence of a dangerous woman named Ryogi Shiki. Afterwards, Shiki is sent to Azaka's school, the Reien Academy, during winter break in order to help investigate a series of reports of fairies stealing the student's memories, and a suspicious suicide attempt of Kaori. The two immediately clash as Azaka is in love with her brother (Mikiya) and considers Shiki a love rival.

While walking around the school, Shiki notices a fairy, and chases after it. Azaka, who cannot see the fairies, is left alone and attacked by an unknown person and has her memory stolen, waking up in the evening with no memory of what has occurred. They discover the magus using the fairies is trying to erase everyone's memories of Kaori's suicide attempt, but the school has a written record of the investigation.

Azaka goes alone to check out the suicide site in the old building, as Shiki does not want to wake up this early. While there, Ouji finds her and requests that Azaka pray with her in the chapel. After praying, she reveals she is the one using the fairies to erase everyone's memories. She was friends with Kaori, and did not want anyone to remember the disgrace of her suicide, so she acquired magic for her sake. Ouji also wants to punish the other students, who looked the other way after Hideo Hayama (the teacher who went missing) forced Kaori into a relationship with him, driving her to suicide. She killed Hayama and used his body to create the fairies (as you need a corpse to create a familiar). She then tries to erase Azaka's memory. Azaka is knocked unconscious from behind by one of the fairies.

Azaka is found by Satsuki Kurogiri, the teacher replacing Hideo Hayama, strangely still possessing her memory. Shiki arrives and tells Azaka the students of Kaori's class have disappeared. Azaka says she is going to check out the suicide site, but Kurogiri strangely tells her that there is nothing there, and upon arriving there she finds a large section of the building has disappeared without a trace. Unable to find Ouji, Azaka falls asleep, and is woken some time later by the dog left by her roommate. Shiki tells her a message from Mikiya: Kurogiri's real identity is a magus known as "God's Word," who can control people's recognition using words, a counter measure to his ability, as well as the cause of Hideo Hayama's death.

Taking Shiki's walkman and earphones to ignore his words, Azaka runs past Kurogiri without being affected by his ability, and heads to the suicide site to discover all the students there in a trance with lighted matches and open canisters of fuel, Ouji intending for them to commit suicide in the same manner as Kaori attempted. Azaka and Ouji face off in the chapel, while Shiki faces off with Kurogiri. Azaka tries to convince Ouji to stop, revealing Hayama died from a heart attack due to his drug abuse, and the information about Hayama forcing Kaori into a relationship was just a rumor the fairies overheard from the students. Kaori learned Hayama was a drug addict and he injected her with drugs to prevent her from telling everyone, making her become an addict in the process. The side effects before her suicide were withdrawal, and Kaori could not forgive herself for becoming addicted. Nobody killed anyone, but Kurogiri had stolen Ouji's memory to make her come to the wrong conclusion. Ouji refuses to stop, preferring to believe her belief of events to avoid besmirching Kaori's memory, and tries to kill her with the fairies. Eventually, they rebel against Ouji and Azaka destroys them and the source of the magic, before they can kill Ouji.

Kurogiri reveals Araya Soren requested he return to Japan to restore Shiki's memory from before her accident and subsequent two-year coma. Shiki tries to kill him, but Kurogiri simply says "You'll lose sight of me" and Shiki becomes unable to see him. After everything is settled, Mikiya tells Azaka that Kaori regained consciousness in the hospital. The bus arrives, but instead of getting on, Azaka pulls Mikiya away and insists on a date to make up for him going out with Shiki the other day (Movie 3, Mikiya is supposed to meet Azaka but sends Shiki to tell her he can't make it). At night, Azaka remembers a dream from her childhood, and why and how she fell in love with Mikiya.

The restoration of Shiki's memory via God's Word as well as what happened to Kurogiri after the movie are left unexplained, though in the original novel much more about him is touched upon. He is killed by Ouji.

In the epilogue, Rio Shirazumi, who was a senior student at Mikiya's school before graduation, kills a man in an alley. Unsure what to do with the body, he starts to eat it to dispose of it, only to stop part way. Araya Soren appears behind him and asks why he stopped since he had the will to begin. Shirazumi wonders if that means he is broken and Araya tells him to break completely. He does so, devouring the body and awakening his Origin.

== Cast ==
- Maaya Sakamoto as Shiki Ryougi
- Ayumi Fujimura as Azaka Kokutou
- Ryōtarō Okiayu as Satsuki Kurogiri
- Nana Mizuki as Misaya Ouji
- Kenichi Suzumura as Mikiya Kokutou
  - Eri Kitamura as young Mikiya
- Takako Honda as Touko Aozaki
- Yuichi Ishigami as Hideo Hayama
- Eri Kitamura as Kaori Tachibana
- Yuka Iguchi as Shizune Seo
- Sōichirō Hoshi as Lio Shirazumi
- Jouji Nakata as Souren Araya
