= The Garden of Sinners: Remaining Sense of Pain =

2008 film by Mitsuru Obunai

- Theatrical release poster
- Directed by: Mitsuru Obunai
- Screenplay by: Masaki Hiramatsu
- Story by: Kinoko Nasu
- Based on: The Garden of Sinners by Kinoko Nasu
- Produced by: Atsuhiro Iwakami; Hikaru Kondo
- Starring: Maaya Sakamoto; Kenichi Suzumura; Takako Honda; Mamiko Noto
- Music by: Yuki Kajiura; Kalafina
- Production company: ufotable
- Distributed by: Aniplex
- Release date: February 9, 2008
- Running time: 57 minutes
- Country: Japan
- Language: Japanese

The Garden of Sinners: Remaining Sense of Pain (空の境界 第三章 痛覚残留, Kara no Kyōkai Dai-Sanshō: Tsūkaku Zanryū) is a 2008 Japanese animated film produced by ufotable based on The Garden of Sinners novels by Kinoko Nasu. It is the third installment in the series, preceded by A Study in Murder – Part 1 (2007) and followed by The Hollow Shrine (2008). Chronologically, the events that occur in The Garden of Sinners: Remaining Sense of Pain are the third in the timeline of the series.

== Plot ==
Gangsters rape a teenaged girl, Fujino Asagami, in an abandoned bar. Mikiya Kokutō finds her unconscious and brings her to his apartment. When Mikiya awakens the next day, he notices that Fujino has already left. The news reports on several gangsters dismembered and killed at the bar.

Later at Garan no Dou, Tōko talks with Shiki Ryōgi about the recent deaths and asks her to capture a suspect for a client. Shiki, confident she will recognize the suspect on sight, leaves without reading the suspect's dossier. Meanwhile, Mikiya asks his friend Gakutō to lend him money. Gakutō agrees on the condition that Mikiya help him find a mutual friend, Keita Minato.

Meanwhile, Fujino tortures one of her rapists with her psychic powers for Keita's whereabouts. Later, after Fujino kills another victim, she is confronted by Shiki, but before they can fight, a sudden change in Fujino's character prompts Shiki to leave. A flashback in Fujino's childhood reveals her inability to feel pain. In the present day, Fujino calls Keita, saying she finally feels pain and thus feels alive. She instructs Keita, the sole survivor of her murder spree, to remain silent on her crimes, as she wants a normal life.

Unbeknownst to Fujino, Mikiya is with Keita and overhears. Keita reveals that he and his friends have gang-raped Fujino for some time, but she did not show any signs of pain or emotion until recently, when one of the rapists hit her in the lower back. Despite his disgust towards Keita, Mikiya brings him to Garan no Dou for protection. There, Tōko tells Mikiya that Keita confessed to his friend stabbing Fujino on the night of the murders, which triggered her desire to kill, but that Shiki did not notice any wounds when she first met Fujino. Tōko surmises that the pain is still inside Fujino's body, and she would resort to killing to relieve the pain. Mikiya then leaves to investigate Fujino's past. After a driver is killed while about to accidentally crash into Fujino, Shiki resolves to stop Fujino.

A flashback reveals that Fujino once met Mikiya years ago. In the present day, Mikiya discovers that Fujino was initially able to feel pain, but her father artificially sealed that ability away to suppress her telekinetic powers. Tōko deduces that Fujino was never stabbed in the first place, but she was indeed feeling pain the moment she was about to be stabbed. The true source of her pain is revealed to be an untreated, ruptured appendix, and Tōko concludes Fujino has much time left before dying.

Shiki confronts Fujino again and fights her on a newly constructed bridge. During the fight, Shiki cuts off Fujino's telekinetic abilities using her "Mystic Eyes of Death Perception" ability. Fujino uses her newly acquired powers to destroy the entire bridge without the need of her sight, but this leaves her badly injured. She tries to escape, realizing her desire to live and her love towards Mikiya, but she is found by Shiki, who stabs her non-fatally. Mikiya and Tōko arrive to find Shiki, who reveals Fujino lost her sensitivity to pain in the end. Mikiya calls a medical team to treat Fujino.

Mikiya confesses to Shiki that he is concerned about Fujino, whose acts will haunt her mind and continue hurting her. He also confesses that he will stay by Shiki's side, by which Shiki confesses that she feels a small murderous intent towards Mikiya.

== Cast ==
- Maaya Sakamoto as Shiki Ryougi
- Kenichi Suzumura as Mikiya Kokutou
- Takako Honda as Touko Aozaki
- Mamiko Noto as Fujino Asagami
- Ayumi Fujimura as Azaka Kokutou
- Kenji Takahashi as Gakuto
- Shintarō Asanuma as Keita Minato
- Yuichi Nakamura as Kouhei
- Makiko Nitta as Fujino's mother
