= The Garden of Sinners: A Study in Murder – Part 1 =

2007 film by Takuya Nonaka

- DVD cover artwork
- Directed by: Takuya Nonaka
- Screenplay by: Masaki Hiramatsu
- Story by: Kinoko Nasu
- Based on: The Garden of Sinners by Kinoko Nasu
- Produced by: Atsuhiro Iwakami; Hikaru Kondo
- Starring: Maaya Sakamoto; Kenichi Suzumura; Hiroki Tōchi
- Music by: Yuki Kajiura; Kalafina
- Production company: ufotable
- Distributed by: Aniplex
- Release date: December 29, 2007
- Running time: 59 minutes
- Country: Japan
- Language: Japanese

The Garden of Sinners: A Study in Murder – Part 1 (空の境界 第二章 殺人考察（前）, Kara no Kyōkai Dai-Nishō: Satsujin Kōsatsu (Zen)) is a 2007 Japanese animated film produced by ufotable based on The Garden of Sinners novels by Kinoko Nasu. It is the second installment in the series, preceded by Overlooking View (2007) and followed by Remaining Sense of Pain (2008). Chronologically, the events that occur in The Garden of Sinners: A Study in Murder – Part 1 are the first in the timeline of the series.

== Plot ==
In 1995, Mikiya Kokutō briefly encounters a girl named Shiki Ryōgi while walking home. At high school, he sees her in a crowd. He introduces himself to her. While Shiki has apparently forgotten their prior meeting and behaves significantly differently, the two become friends. Sometime later, at night, Shiki leaves home and wander around Mifune City. She finds the corpse of a traffic accident victim and applies their blood to her lips, seemingly in a trance.

That night, a man is killed by an unseen attacker with a knife. During lunchtime the next day, Mikiya discusses the murder with Shiki, displeasing her. When three more victims are killed similarly, Mikiya stays with Shiki while she waits for an associate to pick her up from school. They argue when Mikiya inquires about her ignoring the invitation to an upperclassman's farewell party. Said upperclassman Lio Shirazumi also reprimands Shiki: "I know that you are irritated, but four times is a bit too much, isn't it?" but Shiki does not reply. Later that night, Shiki leaves her home again to explore Mifune City and encounters a fifth corpse.

Sometime later, Shiki's servant Akitaka reveals that she is the successor to the Ryōgi family because she inherited their unique condition of having multiple independent personalities; in Shiki's case, her alter ego, Shiki, is male. Later on, Mikiya finds a letter in his desk from Shiki asking him out on a date. Shiki shows up, but she acts boyish, leaving Mikiya confused. Over a meal, she reveals that Shiki is currently in control of her body. He explains that he represents Shiki's rebellious impulses and reveals the two personalities have been unusually out of sync recently: Whatever Shiki likes, Shiki does not vice-versa.

Later, Mikiya has dinner with his detective cousin Daisuke, who is investigating the recent murders. Daisuke explains that the police had found Mikiya's school emblem at the latest murder scene. After school, Shiki cryptically warns Mikiya that Shiki will kill "anything that opens up her isolation with the world". Despite this, he offers to eat lunch with Shiki the next day. He notices a bandaged injury on her left arm, and she admits she got it during the latest killing. Mikiya does not believe her, but Shiki warns him again that if he does not back off, she will end up killing him as well. He later learns from Daisuke that the killer might have an injury around the elbow, the location that Shiki had bandaged. Panicking, Mikiya goes to Shiki's mansion and finds her drenched in blood with a freshly beheaded corpse. She spots and approaches him to give a cryptic warning.

After the police arrives at the crime scene, Mikiya pretends to not have seen anybody, but he secretly returns to Shiki's house nightly to keep watch. Eventually, she loses her patience and confronts Mikiya, who still refuses to believe she is the killer. When Mikiya continues to keep watch, Shiki chases him to the outside road and holds him at knifepoint. When Shiki demands him to say something, Mikiya tells her that he doesn't want to die. Shiki then declares her intent to kill him.

Screeching tires are heard, and the scene switches to June 1998, when Mikiya has started working for the magus Tōko Aozaki. He visits a hospitalized, comatose Shiki with flowers, telling her that he has always believed in her.

== Cast ==
- Maaya Sakamoto as Shiki Ryougi
- Kenichi Suzumura as Mikiya Kokutou
- Hiroki Tōchi as Daisuke Akimi
- Takako Honda as Touko Aozaki
- Makoto Yasumura as Akitaka Suzurigi
- Sōichirō Hoshi as Lio Shirazumi
- Kenji Takahashi as Gakuto
- Ryo Sugisaki as Shiki's father
- Kaori Akashi as Mikiya's mother
