= Minori Scramble! =

Japanese manga series

- Cover of the Minori Scramble! manga volume, published by Houbunsha

みのりスクランブル! (Minori Sukuranburu!)
- Genre: Comedy
- Manga
- Written by: Mikage Chihaya
- Published by: Houbunsha
- Magazine: Manga Time Kirara Forward
- Original run: July 2007 – February 2008
- Volumes: 1
- Original video animation
- Directed by: Takuya Nonaka
- Written by: Masaki Hiramatsu
- Studio: Ufotable
- Released: February 15, 2012

Minori Scramble! (みのりスクランブル!, Minori Sukuranburu!) is a Japanese manga series written and illustrated by Mikage Chihaya. It was serialized in Houbunsha's Manga Time Kirara Forward between the July 2007 and February 2008 issues; a single tankōbon volume was published in February 2008. An anime series produced by Ufotable has been announced. Auditions for the lead roles were held during the Machi*Asobi anime event in Tokushima Prefecture, starting October 9, 2010.

== Plot ==
The story revolves around Tamaki Kakegawa, a fifth grade girl whose father is a penguin researcher. As such, Tamaki is constantly surrounded by penguins and has grown to hate them. In order to cure Tamaki's hatred of penguins, a "penguinoid" named Minori is built to befriend her.
