= Aldnoah.Zero =

Anime television series

- アルドノア・ゼロ; Arudonoa Zero
- Genre: Mecha; Military science fiction
- Created by: Olympus Knights (Note: Plot designed by Gen Urobuchi)
- Anime television series
- Directed by: Ei Aoki
- Written by: Katsuhiko Takayama; Gen Urobuchi; Shinsuke Onishi; Ayumi Sekine
- Music by: Hiroyuki Sawano
- Studio: A-1 Pictures; Troyca
- Licensed by: AUS: Hanabee; NA: Aniplex of America; UK: Anime Limited
- Original network: Tokyo MX, GTV, GYT, BS11, ABC, AT-X
- Original run: July 5, 2014 – March 28, 2015
- Episodes: 24 + OVA
- Manga

Aldnoah.Zero Season One
- Written by: Olympus Knights
- Illustrated by: Pinakes
- Published by: Houbunsha
- English publisher: NA: Yen Press
- Imprint: Manga Time KR Comics Forward Series
- Original run: August 11, 2014 – July 13, 2015
- Volumes: 4
- Manga

Aldnoah.Zero Gaiden: Twin Gemini
- Written by: Kiyokazu Satake
- Published by: Houbunsha
- Imprint: Manga Time KR Comics Forward Series
- Original run: December 12, 2014 – December 12, 2015
- Volumes: 4
- Manga

Aldnoah.Zero Season Two
- Written by: Olympus Knights
- Illustrated by: Mahi Fuyube
- Published by: Houbunsha
- Imprint: Manga Time KR Comics Forward Series
- Original run: February 12, 2015 – December 12, 2016
- Volumes: 5
- icon

Aldnoah.Zero (Note: Japanese: アルドノア・ゼロ, Hepburn: Arudonoa Zero) is a Japanese anime television and print series created by Olympus Knights and A-1 Pictures. It presents the fictional story of the Vers Empire's 37 clans of Orbital Knights' attempted reconquest of Earth—enabled by the empowering titular Aldnoah energy/drive technology—following return to Earth as a more technologically advanced people after a human diaspora to the planet Mars.

Plotted by Gen Urobuchi with direction by Ei Aoki, the series features principal Japanese voice acting by Natsuki Hanae, Sora Amamiya and Kensho Ono, with animated relational and battle scenes set on or in the orbit of the fictional Earth of 2014, the Landing Castles of the Vers Empire's Orbital Knights, Vers bases on a shattered remnant of Earth's Moon, and occasionally, the Vers palace of its failing emperor on Mars. The series began from July 2014 to March 2015, had presented two 12-episode seasons, with Urobuchi, Katsuhiko Takayama and Shinsuke Onishi, and then Hiroyuki Sawano and Kalafina, respectively, receiving principal script-writing and music credits. An 24.5th episode original video animation bonus titled "The Penultimate Truth" was originally incorporated into the compilation film that premiered in February 2025 and was later included in a Blu-Ray disc box set of the series that was released March 2025.

== Plot ==
In an alternate 1972, during the Apollo 17 mission, an ancient alien artifact named the "Hypergate" (ハイパーゲート, Haipāgēto) was discovered on the surface of the Moon, allowing for near-instantaneous travel to and from Mars and the colonisation of Mars. After settlers discover additional alien technology on Mars be known as "Aldnoah" (アルドノア, Arudonoa), they unilaterally declare independence from Earth to found the Vers Empire. Later, the Vers Empire declares war on Earth in 1999 and a battle on the Moon's surface causes the Hypergate to explode, shattering the Moon and scattering the remnants of the Moon into a debris belt around Earth. Cut off from Mars, the remnants of the Vers Empire Forces establishes several massive orbital space stations within the debris belt and a ceasefire was established. 15 years later, in 2014, an attack on the First Princess of Vers during a diplomatic mission to Earth causes the Empire and its 37 clans of Orbital Knights (軌道騎士, Kidō Kishi) to launch a new attack on Earth, this time determined to conquer it once and for all.

== Characters ==
=== Main ===
Inaho Kaizuka (界塚 伊奈帆, Kaizuka Inaho)
Voiced by: Natsuki Hanae (Japanese); Max Mittelman (English)
A student attending Shinawara High School at the top of his class, he lives with his elder sister, Yuki, before the start of the war on which the plot is focused; when the war begins, he joins the United Forces of Earth along with his classmates in the war against the Vers. He is characterised by his emotionless, stoic demeanor; in addition, he displays extraordinary ingenuity in battle, regularly devising devastating tactics to defeat Martian Knights in battle. According to Yuki, he may have developed feelings for Princess Asseylum. This is later proven true when his AI partner inadvertently confesses to Asseylum that Inaho sees her as an extension of himself, and values her life even more than his own. During the war, while the rest of his squad uses the more heavily armored KG-7 Areion, he operates a training unit, the KG-6 Sleipnir as his personal machine, preferring its greater maneuverability over the thicker armour of the Areion, which he correctly determines matters little in the war against the more technologically advanced Vers Empire. He has the ability to activate Aldnoah Drive technology, having inadvertently received a part of Asseylum's powers after carrying out CPR on her and accidentally ingesting some of her blood and saliva. After he was shot by Slaine, he receives a cybernetic left eye to replace the damaged one; the eye, which contains both a processor specialized in movement-prediction algorithms intended to replace the also damaged temporal cortex of his brain and an artificial intelligence originally designed to run said algorithms, advances his ability to engage Orbital Knights to an even higher degree. But the powerful AI-run eye comes at a massive cost as his inability to process large amounts of data for a long period of time continues to damage his brain. In the final battle of the war, he defeats Slaine in one-on-one Kataphrakt combat, sparing his life at the request of Asseylum, after which Slaine is imprisoned. The series ends with Inaho, now having the AI-run implant removed, explaining Asseylum's wish that he live to Slaine, and confirming that Inaho will watch over him during his imprisonment. He leaves Slaine's private prison looking out to the sea, reminiscing about his days with Asseylum.
Slaine Troyard (スレイン・トロイヤード, Surein Toroiyādo)
Voiced by: Kenshō Ono (Japanese); Zach Aguilar (English)
A Terran (Earth-born human) subservient to the Vers Count Cruhteo and Inaho's nemesis. Slaine is a close friend of Princess Asseylum, who saved Slaine and his now-deceased father five years prior to the beginning of the story. He is fiercely loyal to her and although he is at first a pacifist, he will shoot to kill when he believes that Princess Asseylum's safety is endangered. After Saazbaum nearly kills Asseylum, he shoots and leaves Inaho for dead, sparing Saazbaum and declaring his full loyalty to the Martians. He is later knighted by Count Saazbaum and pilots the Kataphrakt Tharsis, which once belonged to Cruhteo and has a precognitive ability. After being named as Saazbaum's heir, he kills Saazbaum as vengeance for Princess Asseylum and rises to the rank of Count. Long in love with the unconscious Asseylum, Slaine grieves her silently and agrees to marry Princess Lemrina, who poses as Asseylum. Upon Asseylum's reawakening, his frustration and despair corrupt his personality, and he changes from a peaceful, well-intentioned young man to a war-hungry militant. This, compounded with his growing ire of Inaho's success on the battlefield, his ignorance to his fellow Terran's political subterfuge, and the realization that Asseylum has feelings for his greatest rival, causes a mental breakdown that destabilizes his own ranks. This positioning allows Asseylum's revelation of his conspiracy to cause him to be abandoned by the majority of his allied Counts. In a final act of defiance, he engages in a brutal final battle with Inaho, piloting his Tharsis against Inaho in brutal one-on-one combat. He is narrowly defeated by Inaho, and afterward has the entire blame of the war placed on him and is subsequently imprisoned; his bitterness and rage are quelled only by Inaho's telling him that Asseylum specifically asked Inaho to spare him.
Asseylum Vers Allusia (アセイラム・ヴァース・アリューシア, Aseiramu Vāsu Aryūshia)
Voiced by: Sora Amamiya (Japanese); Erika Harlacher (English)
The First Princess of the Vers Empire. She is very close to Slaine and is curious to learn about Earth. Visiting Earth on a diplomatic visit, her motorcade is attacked, and she is presumed dead; while she was not killed in the attack (a body double replaced her, as she had fallen ill), the attempted assassination is used by the Orbital Knights as a casus belli for their invasion. Asseylum travels with Inaho's group under a false identity ("Seylum") until she transmits a message to her grandfather on Mars, in hopes of stopping the rekindled war. After Saazbaum nearly kills her, Slaine convinces the Count to save her instead. She remains in suspended animation while recovering from her injuries, eventually awakening to find that Slaine and Princess Lemrina are waging war against Earth in her name. While escaping Slaine's military base, she encounters an unconscious Inaho and is able to escape with the help of the AI implanted in his mechanical eye. While assisting her, the AI inadvertently confesses Inaho's affection for the Princess, explaining that the earthling views her as an extension of himself. Asseylum then asks the AI that she reciprocates his feeling, confessing her own admiration and love. After escaping, Asseylum eventually regains control of the Vers Empire and is betrothed to the son of Count Cruhteo, Count Klancain who shares her desire for peace with Earth. She does this to separate the Vers military from Slaine's forces, which he had allied by using Lemrina in disguise to claim the position for himself and exposing his treachery. By denying Slaine the majority of his allies, the Earth's military is able to defeat the remnants of Slaine's forces. Taking control of the Vers Empire, Asseylum marries Count Klancain and establishes a lasting peace between Earth and Mars. The series ends with her reminiscing about her lessons with Slaine, and her days at sea with Inaho.

=== United Earth ===
Rayet Areash (ライエ・アリアーシュ, Raie Ariāshu)
Voiced by: Sachika Misawa (Japanese); Cristina Vee (English)
A Martian girl living on Earth. Her personality was seemingly cold and emotionless but before being heavily emotionally scarred, she was originally a cheerful girl that loved her father, Wolf Areash (ウォルフ・アリアーシュ, Worufu Ariāshu) who was stranded on Earth after the First Earth-Mars War. Her father and a few comrades carry out the assassination attempt on Princess Asseylum in exchange for the promise of extraction back to Mars and knighthood under the Vers Empire. Rayet witnessed Trillram murder her father and fellow conspirators to keep them quiet and, after Yuki rescued her, swore vengeance on the Martians. She eventually becomes a member of Inaho's squad.
Inko Amifumi (網文 韻子, Amifumi Inko)
Voiced by: Mikako Komatsu (Japanese); Erica Mendez (English)
Inaho's childhood friend and fellow high school classmate, who is strongly hinted to have feelings for Inaho. She is a member of the Student Council Committee and later a member of Inaho's squad.
Calm Craftman (カーム・クラフトマン, Kāmu Kurafutoman)
Voiced by: Taishi Murata (Japanese); Bryce Papenbrook (English)
Inaho's friend and classmate. He comes from a country that was severely affected by Heaven's Fall. Despite the name, he is actually very loud and jovial, though he swears vengeance on all Martians after a Knight kills his friend. He becomes a mechanic in service to the United Forces of Earth.
Nina Klein (ニーナ・クライン, Nīna Kurain)
Voiced by: Ai Kakuma (Japanese); Christine Marie Cabanos (English)
Inko's best friend who is also in Inaho's class. She comes from the same country as Calm that was severely affected by Heaven's Fall. She operates controls for the Deucalion aboard its bridge.
Okisuke Mikuni (箕国 起助, Mikuni Okisuke)
Voiced by: Yoshitaka Yamaya (Japanese); Bobby Thong (English)
Inaho's friend and classmate. His friends call him Okojo (オコジョ, Okojo). He is killed while trying to save Yuki from Trillram.
Kisaki Matsuribi (祭陽 希咲, Matsuribi Kisaki)
Voiced by: Kengo Kawanishi (Japanese); Kyle McCarley (English)
A Shinawara High student who is Inaho's senior, and one of the volunteers for lieutenant Marito's rescue crew.
Yūtarō Tsumugi (詰城 祐太朗, Tsumugi Yūtarō)
Voiced by: Sōma Saitō (Japanese); Lucien Dodge (English)
A Shinawara High student who is Inaho's senior, and one of the volunteers for Lieutenant Marito's rescue crew.
Yuki Kaizuka (界塚 ユキ, Kaizuka Yuki)
Voiced by: Sayaka Ohara (Japanese); Erica Lindbeck (English)
Inaho's older sister and a Warrant Officer in service to the United Forces of Earth. She is capable of piloting a Kataphrakt into battle and has helped to train Kataphrakt pilots at the academy. She constantly worries that Inaho might get killed with all his plans, but supports him nonetheless. When Inaho is nearly killed, she abandons the Deucalion crew for 19 months before eventually returning alongside Marito.
Koichirō Marito (鞠戸 孝一郎, Marito Koichirō)
Voiced by: Kazuya Nakai (Japanese); Matt Mercer (English)
A Lieutenant of the United Forces of Earth. He, along with Yuki, was originally a training instructor at the high school Inaho attends, but is also a veteran of the War of 1999, and witnessed firsthand the power of Aldnoah. Despite reporting what happened 15 years ago before Heaven's Fall, the governments of Earth refused to publicize any information, as it showed how outmatched Earth's forces truly were. One of his close friends was killed in that battle, and Marito now suffers from PTSD and drinks heavily to cope with his flashbacks to the battle.
Sōma Yagarai (耶賀頼 蒼真, Yagarai Sōma)
Voiced by: Kōsuke Toriumi (Japanese); Ethan Murray (English)
A doctor living in the city of Shinawara and a friend of Marito who helps him deal with his trauma.
Darzana Magbaredge (ダルザナ・マグバレッジ, Daruzena Magubarejji) / Darzana Humeray (ダルザナ・ヒュームレイ, Daruzena Hyūmerei) (birth name)
Voiced by: Ai Kayano (Japanese); Julie Ann Taylor (English)
A Captain of the United Forces of Earth. She helps Marito evacuate the civilians while Inaho and his friends distract Trillram. She blames Marito for the death of her biological older brother, John Humeray (ジョン・ヒュームレイ, Jyon Hyūmerei) who died in the battle of Tanegashima before Heaven's Fall.
Kaoru Mizusaki (不見咲 カオル, Mizusaki Kaoru)
Voiced by: Yū Shimamura (Japanese); Trina Loo (English)
Captain Magbaredge's executive officer. She takes command of the refugee escort mission when Darzana volunteers to help Marito. Darzana usually tries to give her some dating advice, even in the middle of a battle.
Shigō Kakei (筧 至剛, Kakei Shigō)
Voiced by: Makoto Furukawa (Japanese); Alan Lee (English)
A sergeant of the United Forces of Earth, and one of the volunteers for lieutenant Marito's rescue crew.

=== Vers Empire ===
Eddelrittuo (エデルリッゾ, Ederurizzo)
Voiced by: Inori Minase (Japanese); Sandy Fox (English)
A young Martian girl who serves Princess Asseylum as her loyal maid. She has unintentionally revealed the princess' identity on numerous occasions. She is very conscious of etiquette and takes offense when people speak to the princess in a casual manner. She temporary serves Lemrina, Asseylum's half sister, and near the end of the episode, returns to Princess Asseylum's service.
Cruhteo (クルーテオ, Kurūteo)
Voiced by: Shō Hayami (Japanese); Lex Lang (English)
A Count of the Vers Empire and one of the Martian Knights who beats Slaine for any slight, no matter how small. A friend of Saazbaum, but he seems to be unaware that Saazbaum is one of the conspirators who tried to assassinate the princess. After he brutally tortures Slaine for information, he realizes the truth about the princess' alleged assassination. He apologizes to Slaine and swears to find the culprits, only to be attacked and killed by Saazbaum. His Kataphrakt Tharsis, that possesses precognitive abilities, is given to Slaine by Saazbaum.
Saazbaum (ザーツバルム, Zātsubarumu)
Voiced by: Tōru Ōkawa (Japanese); Kirk Thornton (English)
A Count of the Vers Empire, one of the Martian Knights, and a friend of Cruhteo who has been eager to rekindle a war between Mars and Earth. He is one of the conspirators behind the murder attempt of Princess Asseylum. He pilots the Kataphrakt Dioskuria and uses it to attack Cruhteo's castle when he realizes he has been discovered. He kills his fellow Martian Knight and captures Slaine. He reveals that Slaine's father saved him during the Heaven's Fall, hence the reason of why he took Slaine when he thought Cruhteo was going to kill him. The woman he loved died during Heaven's Fall and blames the royal family for her death, so now he wants to kill Asseylum and take Earth's resources as a way of revenge. His Dioskuria possesses a barrier like the Nilokeras, a beam katana like the Argyre, and rocket punches like the Hellas. Inaho defeated him by taking advantage of every weakness it possesses. Despite shooting to kill the princess, he is spared by Slaine and forced to save her. He eventually adopts Slaine and names him his successor but during a battle, he is killed by his adoptive son in a trap set for Inaho, but Slaine justifies it as revenge for trying to kill Asseylum.
Trillram (トリルラン, Toriruran)
Voiced by: Takahiro Sakurai (Japanese); Todd Haberkorn (English)
A Martian Knight and Baron under the Vers Empire who enjoys killing Terrans, and also killed fellow Martians who carried out the attempted assassination on Princess Asseylum to tie up loose ends. He pilots the Kataphrakt Nilokeras, that possesses a defensive shield that absorbs all types of matter that touch it, until Inaho found its weakness. Later he was shot dead after inadvertently revealing to Slaine that he was one of the conspirators.
Vlad (ブラド, Burado)
Voiced by: Hiroki Yasumoto (Japanese); Patrick Seitz (English)
A Martian Knight in pursuit of survivors from Shinawara who pilots the Kataphrakt Argyre, that has a large beam katana, capable of cutting through anything, including explosive rounds shot in its direction. He was forced to retreat after being defeated by Inaho, Calm and Inko. He returns, trying to get his revenge and battles Inaho, only to be killed once Inaho uses the power of his sword against him; he makes him fall in the ocean and the temperature of the beams cause a massive steam explosion that obliterates him.
Femieanne (フェミーアン, Femīan)
Voiced by: Yuki Kaida (Japanese); Carrie Keranen (English)
A Martian Knight with the rank of Countess who encounters the survivors of Shinawara when they arrive to Tanegashima. She pilots the Kataphrakt Hellas, that can shoot its six arms as missiles, but act more like drones than actual "projectiles". Aside from its fists, the Hellas has no other weapons, which renders it vulnerable to melee attacks. After all six of her arms are destroyed by the teamwork of Slaine and Inaho, she turns Hellas into a flying platform, only to be crushed by the giant battleship Deucalion powered by Asseylum. She is then finished off by Rayet.
Orlane (オルレイン, Orurein)
Voiced by: Mamiko Noto (Japanese); Mela Lee (English)
A Martian Knight with the rank of Viscountess and Saazbaum's late betrothed, who piloted the gigantic Kataphrakt Deucalion, that possessed anti-gravity powers. She died during Heaven's Fall when she and Saazbaum were sent to Tanegashima as an advance party and her anti-gravity device got damaged with the destruction of the Hyper Gate, urging Saazbaum to leave her behind. The Aldnoah Drive of her Kataphrakt was used in the creation of the flying battleship Deucalion.
Harklight (ハークライト, Hākuraito)
Voiced by: Daisuke Hirakawa (Japanese); Ben Pronsky (English)
A subordinate of the Martian Knights who is assigned to Slaine, despite being older, and comes to greatly admire him, since he comes from a humble family. He is later given Herschel, Marylcian's Kataphrakt by Slaine. He and the Stygis platoon refuse to abandon Slaine when he orders them to retreat in the final battle.
Yacoym (ヤーコイム, Yākoimu)
Voiced by: Kazuyuki Okitsu
A Martian Knight and Baron that attacks the Deucalion while it's going through repairs. He pilots the Kataphrakt Elysium, that's capable of creating a 1km radius Entropy Dilution Field, that freezes everything around it, and deflects bullets thanks to the Meissner effect. He is killed when Inaho manages to reach him and shoots him at point blank.
Marylcian (マリルシャン, Marirushan)
Voiced by: Susumu Chiba (Japanese); Derek Stephen Prince (English)
A Martian Knight with the rank of Count, who looks down on Slaine for being a Terran, especially after he ascends to the rank of Count. He challenges Slaine to a duel in order to see who's more worthy of protecting the princess. He pilots the Kataphrakt Herschel that is capable of shooting projectiles incredibly fast in all directions, putting Slaine in trouble, until he manages to lure him to an area where it can only shoot in one direction, destroying his drones. When he tries to flee, Slaine decapitates his Kataphrakt, ejecting him into outer space.
Barouhcruz (バルークルス, Barukurusu)
Voiced by: Ryōta Takeuchi (Japanese); Kaiji Tang (English)
A Martian Knight with the rank of Count, who seems to get along with Marylcian. After Saazbaum is killed, he and Marylcian distrust the ambitions of the newly named Count Slaine, but cannot accuse him since they have no proof. He serves as witness for Marylcian and Slaine's duel. He pilots the Kataphrakt Octantis, that uses a pair of razor-sharp spinning discs on wires, that can even deflect bullets by being spun perpendicular to the bullets' flight path, creating the effect of a shield. He chooses to fight alongside Harklight and the Stygis platoon instead of retreating during the final battle.
Mazuurek (マズゥールカ, Mazū~ruka)
Voiced by: Toshiyuki Toyonaga (Japanese); Robbie Daymond (English)
A Martian Knight contacted by Barouhcruz and Marylcian. He holds no contempt over the people of Earth and merely wants resources and prefers not to fight. He pilots the Kataphrakt Sirenum that's capable of creating a powerful gravitational tornado. He is defeated by Inaho and Marito and captured. When Inaho interrogates him and realizes his intentions are not the same as the other Martians, he tells him about the assassination and his suspicions about the impostor. He is later released by Inaho and Rayet, promising to find the real Asseylum and protect her. His space palace is used as the refuge of Asseylum after he allies with the new Count Cruheteo, the two of whom become the base for what will quickly grow to be her loyalist faction.
Selnakis (セルキナス, Serukinasu)
Voiced by: Hiromichi Tezuka
A Martian Knight and Count who landed in New Orleans. He pilots the Kataphrakt Solis that possesses two plasma beam mounts on its head that can be used to cut through anything. He and his Kataphrakt are destroyed by the Deucalion from extreme range when its crew, led by Inaho, takes advantage of its inability to shoot laser beams beyond the horizon (since lasers are unaffected by the Earth's curvature), while the Deucalion's cannons are able to fire using parabolic trajectories, leaving the Solis unable to retaliate.
Zebrin (ゼブリン, Zeburin)
Voiced by: Ryūichi Kijima (Japanese); David Vincent (English)
A Martian Knight with the rank of Count, who works alongside Count Orga and Countess Rafia. He pilots the Kataphrakt Electris, that's capable of controlling and firing massive bolts of electricity. He is killed when Inaho manages to latch his Kataphrakt onto the Electris and equalize the electric potential between the two Kataphrakts, making him immune to the Electris' lightning attacks and allowing him to safely destroy it.
Rafia (ラフィア, Rafia)
Voiced by: Hitomi Nabatame (Japanese); Amanda C. Miller (English)
A Martian Knight with the rank of Countess, who works alongside Count Zebrin and Count Orga. She pilots the Kataphrakt Scandia, which has powerful cloaking capabilities that leave neither shadow nor heat signature, and is armed with a crossbow that fires explosive arrows. She is killed after her Kataphrakt is located with a smokescreen (as Inaho correctly deduces that, being a physical object, the Kataphrakt will still affect air currents, and could thus be rendered visible by its interaction with the smoke), and destroyed by Yuki's Kataphrakt armed with a high-powered rifle.
Orga (オルガ, Oruga)
Voiced by: Kenta Miyake
A Martian Knight with the rank of Count, who works alongside Count Zebrin and Countess Rafia. He pilots the Kataphrakt Ortygia, which is capable of creating copies of itself through quantum teleportation. However, the Ortygia is able, through unexplained means, to retain the original individual after teleporting, in effect creating a clone of both his Kataphrakt and himself. This means that instead of being drones controlled by a single "master" unit (the initial hypothesis of the Deucalion crew), each copy is the "real" Ortygia and is individually controlled by Orga (or a copy of him), meaning it cannot be destroyed as long as one remains. Inaho kills him by taking control of the weapons systems of every Kataphrakt in his platoon, targeting and firing on every Ortygia unit simultaneously, destroying them all.
Klancain (クランカイン, Kurankain)
Voiced by: Ryōta Ōsaka (Japanese); Vic Mignogna (English)
The eldest son of Count Cruhteo, who arrives from Mars with the interest of meeting Slaine. Unlike his father, he is rather humble and friendly, but also sharp and perceptive. He is still loyal to the Emperor and saves Asseylum from being killed by assassins. He helps Asseylum have one last talk with her grandfather, and becomes her betrothed to help her cement her position as Empress and to make peace with Earth.
Rayregalia Vers Rayvers (レイレガリア・ヴァース・レイヴァース, Reiregaria Vāsu Reivāsu)
Voiced by: Shinji Ogawa, Takayuki Sugō (ep 23) (Japanese); Geoffrey Chalmers (English)
The Martian Emperor and Princess Asseylum's grandfather. He founded the empire in 1985 when the Aldnoah technology recognized him as its master, burning its activation processes into his very genes, giving him supreme authority over them. All of his descendants share this power, and he can grant limited control of the Aldnoah's powers to others. Utilizing this power monopoly, he based the authority of his empire on this military force and created a class of warlords loyal to him who would become the Martian Knights. He retired in 1997 due to health problems, but when his son and heir, Gilzeria, was killed in the war of 1999, he was forced to return to the throne. He has been manipulated by Saazbaum into believing that his granddaughter is truly dead, that Slaine is a spy of the Terrans and that he must officially rekindle the war on Earth. After 19 months his health worsens to the point where he no longer recognizes his surroundings, and before passing away, he has one last talk with Asseylum, remembering when he found the Aldnoah technology and how he wanted to use it to improve all of mankind.
Lemrina Vers Envers (レムリナ・ヴァース・エンヴァース, Remurina Vāsu Envāsu)
Voiced by: Shiina Natsukawa (Japanese); Kira Buckland (English)
The second Princess of the Vers Empire, Rayregalia's other granddaughter and Asseylum's younger half-sister. The two princesses share the same paternal lineage, but have different mothers. She hates her royal heritage and even though she knows she is only a tool to activate the Aldnoah Drive, she continues with her mission since it makes her feel useful, befriending Slaine and later fall in love with him. She also pretends to be Asseylum in a message that urges to continue the war, with only Inaho suspecting she is an impostor. Her lower limbs are weak and she has to rely on a wheel chair for mobility. However, she could use her legs like a normal person in low gravity environment. Her relationship to her half-sister is not close.

== Music ==
Aldnoah.Zero Original Soundtrack

Soundtrack album by Hiroyuki Sawano
- Released: September 10, 2014 (Disc 1); March 18, 2015 (Disc 2)
- Studios: Studio Sound Valley; Studio Sound City
- Genre: Soundtrack
- Length: 1:18:00 (Disc 1); 1:09:44 (Disc 2)
- Label: Aniplex
- Producer: Hiroyuki Sawano

The series' soundtrack was composed by Hiroyuki Sawano. The first soundtrack album was released on September 10, 2014, featuring 20 tracks, including vocal performances by Aimee Blackschleger, Cyua, Mika Kobayashi, and mpi. A second soundtrack album was included in the sixth Blu-ray & DVD volumes of the anime, which was released on March 18, 2015. The second soundtrack album features 19 tracks, with vocals by Sora Amamiya for the track "Harmonious".

The opening theme song of the first season tilted "heavenly blue" performed by Kalafina, The ending theme songs of the first season tilted "A/Z" and "aLIEz", both performed by SawanoHiroyuki[nZk]:mizuki. The opening theme song of the second season tilted "&Z" performed by SawanoHiroyuki[nZk]:mizuki, and the ending theme song of second cour tilted "Genesis" performed by Eir Aoi and for episode 23 and 24.5 tilted "Harmonious" performed by Sora Amamiya.

=== Track listing ===
All music is composed by Hiroyuki Sawano.

Aldnoah.Zero Original Soundtrack
No.	Title	Lyrics	Vocals	Length
1.	"No differences"	Benjamin; mpi	Aimee Blackschleger	4:37
2.	"AZPV"			2:57
3.	"A-0picturez"			3:46
4.	"MKAlieZ"	Hiroyuki Sawano	Mika Kobayashi	3:42
5.	"20140910" (2零14zero91零)			3:49
6.	"AZ-Kat" (アZ-Kat)			3:58
7.	"kanascene" (悲scene)			3:54
8.	"AD2014-7.5/7.9-OA" (AD2014-7.5/7.9-零・A)			3:46
9.	"Aldnoah" (AL°C-@)	Rie	Cyua	2:33
10.	"The Call to Arms"	Benjamin; mpi	mpi	3:45
11.	"Troyard" (十61yard)			4:43
12.	"Kasei" (FIRE★)			5:02
13.	"R0B0T" (R零B零T)			4:04
14.	"SiTE-n0w1"			3:56
15.	"al-door0"			4:17
16.	"Vers" (Ver$)			3:46
17.	"as-inaho" (aズ-17歩)			2:43
18.	"Chikyū wo Kasei" (Ch19ヲFIRE★)			3:56
19.	"AcyOrt"			4:45
20.	"BRE@TH//LESS"	cAnON.	Mika Kobayashi	4:01
Total length:				1:18:00

Aldnoah.Zero Original Soundtrack 2
No.	Title	Lyrics	Performer(s)	Length
1.	"aldnoah0rch-&z"			4:17
2.	"aldnoah0rch-aCY0rt"			4:56
3.	"aldnoah0rch-4rain"			4:25
4.	"aldnoah0rch-@0p"			2:04
5.	"aldnoah0rch-adlib"			2:31
6.	"birth・gt・music"			4:47
7.	"battle・game・music"			4:40
8.	"bpm・gain・mute"			2:11
9.	"haondla-orez1"			5:30
10.	"haondla-orez2"			5:37
11.	"haondla-orez3"			1:41
12.	"haondla-orez4"			2:28
13.	"a/z-p1@n0:5罪vers"			2:31
14.	"a/z-p1@n0:adlib1"			4:30
15.	"a/z-p1@n0:adlib2"			2:45
16.	"a/z-p1@n0:adlib3"			3:14
17.	"Harmonious"	Hajime	Asseylum Vers Allusia starring Sora Amamiya	5:03
18.	"Harmonious -Instrumental-"			5:03
19.	"Harmonious -Short Ver.-"	Hajime	Asseylum Vers Allusia starring Sora Amamiya	1:31
Total length:				1:09:44

== Production ==
Aldnoah.Zero was announced on February 15, 2014, as a project headed by Nitro+, with animation by A-1 Pictures and TROYCA. It was created by Gen Urobuchi and is directed by Ei Aoki, with mechanical designs by Kenji Teraoka, characters by Masako Matsumoto, and designs by Takako Shimura. Aldnoah.Zero's production committee, Project AZ, consists of Aniplex, Houbunsha, Tokyo MX, Nippon BS Broadcasting, Asahi Broadcasting Corporation, MAGES, Nitroplus and Movic.

Katsuhiko Takayama has been responsible for series composition, managing the flow and story of the series. Urobuchi created the mainframe from the story until the preliminary version as Aoki was responsible for the characters; as a result, he does not feel connected with the Inaho developed by Aoki, although he stated, "Aoki-san is a pleasure to work with on storyboard."

The director of Aldnoah.Zero is Ei Aoki and the original creator is listed as Gen Urobuchi, both of whom had previously collaborated on Fate/Zero. The main cast was announced by Aoki at AnimeJapan on March 22, 2014. Urobuchi produced the scripts for the first 3-episodes of the first season, after which Katsuhiko Takayama took over, completing the remaining 9 episodes; Takayama continued in the second season, doing 7, with further writing credits going to Shinsuke Onishi (4 episodes) and Ayumi Sekine (1 episode).

== Broadcast ==
It has been broadcast on Tokyo MX, BS11, Asahi Broadcasting Corporation, Gunma TV and AT-X in Japan, with streaming available on Niconico. Aniplex of America licensed the series for a streamed simulcast beginning in July 2014. It was also streamed in Australia by Hanabee.

== Original video animation ==
An 24.5th episode original video animation bonus titled "The Penultimate Truth" was announced on September 16, 2024. It was later incorporated into the "Aldnoah.Zero (Re+)" compilation film of the series. The OVA was later included in the series' Blu-Ray disc box set release on March 26, 2025. Crunchyroll began streaming the OVA, both subbed and dubbed, on January 28, 2026.

== Compilation film ==
A compilation film of the series titled "Aldnoah.Zero (Re+)" was announced on December 19, 2024. It was also combined with "The Penultimate Truth" OVA. The compilation film premiered in select Japanese theaters on February 28, 2025.

== Reception ==
Reviews were generally negative. Geek Ireland appreciated the artwork and music, but found the plot confusing and the lack of character development disappointing. The Vault, a student publication at McMaster University, found the setup promising and the fights epic, but that the potential of the show fell off after famed show writer Gen Urobuchi handed writing duties off to a junior.
