= Ei Aoki =

Japanese storyboard artist and director

- あおき えい
- Born: 1973 (age 52–53); Tokyo, Japan
- Occupations: Storyboard artist, director

Ei Aoki (あおき えい, Aoki Ei; born 1973) is a Japanese storyboard artist and director. He credits the anime Megazone 23 as his inspiration to have a career in animation. In 2013, he created the animation studio Troyca with Toshiyuki Nagano and Tomonobu Kato, which began animation production on its first work in the fall of 2014. Aoki is the director behind Girls Bravo, The Garden of Sinners: Overlooking View, Ga-Rei: Zero, Wandering Son, Fate/Zero, Aldnoah.Zero, Re:Creators, and Id:Invaded.

== Filmography ==
=== TV series ===
Year	Title	Crew role	Notes	Ref.
2002	Please Teacher!	Episode director, storyboard artist	2 episodes	
2003	Please Twins!	Episode director, storyboard artist	Episode 11	
2004–2005	Girls Bravo series	Director	2 seasons	
2008	Ga-Rei: Zero	Director		
2009	Shangri-La	Storyboard artist	Episode 7	
2011	Wandering Son	Director		
2011–2012	Fate/Zero series	Director	2 seasons	
2013	Haganai NEXT	Storyboard artist	Episode 11	
2014–2015	Aldnoah.Zero series	Director	2 seasons	
2017	Re:Creators	Director		
2018–2023	Idolish7 series	Supervisor	3 seasons	
2018	Bloom Into You	Storyboard artist	Episode 6	
2019	The Case Files of Lord El-Melloi II: Rail Zeppelin Grace Note	Supervisor		
2020	Id:Invaded	Director		
2022	Sabikui Bisco	Storyboard artist	Episode 11	
2022	Shinobi no Ittoki	Storyboard artist	Episode 11	
2023	Overtake!	Director		
2024	Atri: My Dear Moments	Storyboard artist	3 episodes	
2026	Iron Wok Jan	Director		
TBA	Special Kid Factory	Supervisor		

=== ONAs ===
Year	Title	Crew role	Notes	Ref.
2021	Id:Indeed	Chief director, writer, storyboard		

=== Films ===
Year	Title	Crew role	Notes	Ref.
2007	The Garden of Sinners: Overlooking View	Director		
2008	The Garden of Sinners: Remaining Sense of Pain	Assistant unit director		
2013	The Garden of Sinners: Future Gospel – Extra Chorus	Director, writer		
