= List of The Garden of Sinners characters =

This is a list of The Garden of Sinners characters.

== Major characters ==
Shiki Ryougi (両儀式, Ryōgi Shiki)
Voiced by: Tomoko Kawakami (drama CD), Maaya Sakamoto (movies)
A teenage girl who recently recovered from a two-year coma. She originally had three personalities, a male personality named SHIKI (織, Shiki) and the original female personality Shiki (式, Shiki), both are aware and conscious of one another, but possessing different qualities. A third genderless personality known as "Void" never manifests due to extreme apathy but also embodies the Root of all existence. As a family of demon hunters, children born into the Ryougi family are generally male. They are raised with two personalities, so the male personality is customarily called the "yang" personality, while the female is called the "yin" personality. It is easy to tell which personality is speaking at a given time because they both have a distinct style of speaking, most notably that the female personality refers to herself with the pronoun watashi (私). In contrast, the male personality refers to himself as ore (オレ). Upon meeting Mikiya, she gradually finds happiness through their relationship, and a schism develops between her two personalities. When she awakens, she finds herself unable to connect her memories to her current identity. While she knows she is Shiki, she does not feel that she is. In the hopes of regaining herself and the "dead" SHIKI, she puts on a cold façade that somewhat resembles the male Shiki's and tries to act as the male SHIKI did. Touko understands the sense of detachment Shiki feels but considers the current Shiki a third, new personality. Her near-death experience awakened her "Mystic Eyes of Death Perception" which is shown by having a rainbow-like color in her pupils. This supernatural ability allows her to see the inherent mortality of everything (both living and non-living) in the form of lines and a single point (which is the "origin" of the object). A cut along any line will bifurcate the object, no matter how sharp the cutting tool and a stab at the point destroys the object's origin, causing instant death.
Reunited with Mikiya, now employed as an investigator for a puppet-maker and powerful sorceress, Touko Aozaki. Shiki assists Touko's detective agency, Garan no Dou, investigating paranormal events where she employs her combat skills to resolve the situation with force if necessary while struggling to come to terms with her identity.
Mikiya Kokutou (黒桐幹也, Kokutō Mikiya)
Voiced by: Kentarō Itō (drama CD), Kenichi Suzumura (movies)
Shiki's love interest (and later husband) who, two years ago, made a promise with Shiki to attend college. He discovers a doll at an exhibition his friend asked him to attend and falls in love with its flawless craftsmanship. He is so charmed by it that he seeks out the maker, Touko Aozaki, and then finds her residence. With his hopes of attending college with Shiki crushed because of her coma, he drops out of college to work under Touko as an assistant investigator. Touko holds his investigative skills highly because of his ability to find her workplace, an abandoned building hidden to all except those who wish to find it. His character design was used as a basis for Tsukihime protagonist, Shiki Tohno.
Azaka Kokutou (黒桐鮮花, Kokutō Azaka)
Voiced by: Yukari Tamura (drama CD), Ayumi Fujimura (movies)
Mikiya's younger sister and is in love with him. She becomes an apprentice of Touko due to her rivalry against Shiki and is talented in ignition magic. She is quite similar both in appearance and abilities to Akiha Tohno (though Akiha's power consists of controlling external heat, whereas Azaka's ability is inducing ignitions). In an interview with Nasu, despite their rivalry, Azaka actually likes Shiki personally, and vice versa, except their relationship with Mikiya has made it difficult for both of them to become good friends.
Touko Aozaki (蒼崎橙子, Aozaki Tōko)
Voiced by: Kikuko Inoue (drama CD), Takako Honda (movies)
Appearing as a puppet maker, Touko is actually a powerful sorceress. She runs a business in an abandoned building called Garan no Dou. This agency sells their work, ranging from architectures to craftsmanships, to whoever is interested. However, Mikiya believes that Touko is simply forcing what she wants to make on the customers. As the company only consists of herself and Mikiya, she is the sole designer while Mikiya takes the secretary's job. Due to Touko's connection with the Magic Association, the agency occasionally takes on supernatural or otherwise abnormal cases despite Touko having run away and distanced herself from the organization long ago. She is the older sister of Aoko Aozaki, who does not have a particularly good relationship with her. In the early editions of the novel, Touko was portrayed with short blue hair. In the newer editions of the books and the movies, she has been given long red hair; Nasu and Takeuchi, dissatisfied with older illustrations of Touko, changed her hair color to reflect her relationship to Aoko Aozaki, who also has red hair.
She is very loose with money which leads to her being broke for months and unable to provide salary for her staff. Touko upgrades Shiki's artificial arm or gives other unique presents as compensation for her work.
She also appears in several Type-Moon releases such as Witch on the Holy Night, Carnival Phantasm, Chibichuki!, Clock Tower 2015, Fate/Extra and The Case Files of Lord El-Melloi II.

== Secondary characters ==
=== Chapter 1 ===
Kirie Fujou (巫条霧絵, Fujō Kirie)
Voiced by: Rie Tanaka (movies), Miki Itō (Drama CD)
A bedridden girl who controls a ghostly version of herself above the Fujou Building (巫条ビル, fujō biru). She is the reason behind the supposed Fujou Building suicides.

=== Chapter 2 ===
Daisuke Akimi (秋巳大輔, Akimi Daisuke)
Voiced by: Hiroki Tōchi (movies), Yuji Ueda (Drama CD)
A detective working with the local law enforcement, Daisuke is Mikiya's cousin who acts as an elder brother figure to him. Despite his scruffy and laid back appearance, Akimi is a diligent investigator who's put in charge of unraveling the truth behind a series of strange murders which he suspect someone from Mikiya's highschool. Daisuke holds Mikiya's investigation ability in high regard and often shares some classified information with him for suggestions.

=== Chapter 3 ===
Fujino Asagami (浅上藤乃, Asagami Fujino)
Voiced by: Mamiko Noto (movies only)
Classmate and friend to Azaka, both students of Reien Girl's Academy (礼園女学院, reien jogakuin). A serial killer who kills her victims in supernatural and heinous ways. Fujino has the unique ability to bend space along with objects within her field of vision. Her family sealed this magical power since childhood by removing her pain sensors. However, at some point, Araya Souren found her and returned the sensation of pain. Fujino initially used this ability for revenge by killing her rapists, twisting their bodies into formless crushed flesh. However, after killing so many people, she started to get addicted and eventually started killing innocent people as well. She later also gains clairvoyance in conjunction with her powers, allowing her to bend objects outside her standard field of vision. Fujino is the main antagonist in the third chapter.

=== Chapter 5 ===
Tomoe Enjou (臙条巴, Enjō Tomoe)
Voiced by: Tetsuya Kakihara (movies only)
A teenager that Shiki takes in. He claims to have killed his parents because of constant dreams of getting killed by his mother. However, the end of the story reveals that he is one of the puppet victims of Souren's experiments. His origin is "worthlessness."
He is quite similar both in appearance and character arc to Shirou Emiya.
Kaede Enjou (臙条楓, Enjō Kaede)
Voiced by: Miki Itō (movies only)
Tomoe's mother and one of Souren's victim experiments. In Tomoe's recollections, he stabbed and disemboweled her. However, in his nightmares, he sees her killing her husband, then him, and then herself.
Souren Araya (荒耶宗蓮, Araya Sōren)
Voiced by: Jouji Nakata (drama CD and movies)
A former Buddhist monk who has lived for around 300 years and a previous acquaintance of Touko from the Sorcerer's Association (魔術協会, Majutsu kyōkai; also known as the Mage's Association) in London. Though he may be considered an average Mage at face value, he is highly skilled in creating Bounded Fields. He carries a special six-layered Bounded Field (六道境界, Rokudō kyōkai) that is capable of preventing the movement of anything within it. It is mobile, something out of the ordinary since Bounded Fields are usually impossible to move, and Araya typically uses it as a weapon. Moreover, he infused himself with a large building that makes it almost like a Reality Marble, solidifying Sōren as an exceptional mage. He is the mastermind behind the actions of the other antagonists by awakening their innate abilities and manipulating them to confront Shiki. Due to Sōren's Origin of "Stillness" and a Śarīra embedded on his body, Shiki had difficulty tracing his "death", making it particularly difficult to kill him.
Cornelius Alba (コルネリウス = アルバ, Korunerius Aruba)
Voiced by: Kōji Yusa (movies only)
Director of the Sponheim Abbey, and acquaintance of Araya and Touko. They were on good terms until Cornelius realized that Touko was a better Mage than he was. Even though he was popularly considered a better Mage than her, he became so obsessed with this inferiority complex that he occasionally became deranged when speaking of her. He joined up with Araya, not because of the latter's goals but solely to kill Touko to prove his superiority. Though he is naturally more powerful than both Araya and Touko, he is blinded by his arrogance and is not nearly as versatile as they are. He used several spells in the novel, including one that had power equivalent to a Noble Phantasm, but none of them made an appearance in the movie.

=== Chapter 6 ===
Satsuki Kurogiri (玄霧皐月, Kurogiri Satsuki)
Voiced by: Ryōtarō Okiayu
A Welsh magus designated to be sealed, known as "God's Word", with an ability to manipulate others through his words alone, causing them to believe what he says. He demonstrated this ability by "convincing" Ryougi Shiki that she could not see him, and she was unable to cut him. Was also the one who gave Misaya Ouji the ability to manipulate the fairies, and was himself capable of manipulating memories, including recalling ones the target cannot remember. Amusingly, his ability is powerless if his target cannot hear him speak.
Misaya Ouji (黄路美沙夜, Ōji Misaya)
Voiced by: Nana Mizuki
The daughter of the Reien's school chairman, was manipulated by "God's Word" into believing that her friend, Kaori Tachibana, committed suicide because she discovered that Hideo Hayama, a school teacher, was taking illegal drugs, and he drugged her in order to keep her silent, and nobody helped her. She planned to take revenge by using the fairies to force the students to commit suicide in the same way that Kaori Tachibana did, at the same site, but was stopped by Azaka.

=== Chapter 7 ===
Lio Shirazumi (白純里緒, Shirazumi Rio)
Voiced by: Sōichirō Hoshi (movies only)
As first introduced in the second chapter, he is Mikiya Kokutou's senior who dropped out of school. The final chapter reveals that he is responsible for the series of murders that Shiki appears to have committed before her coma. After confessing his feelings to Shiki and being rejected, he went to an arcade to blow off some steam, intending to get into a fight. After provoking someone, Lio attacked him from behind, killing the opponent inadvertently. Fearing capture by authorities, Lio attempted to erase the evidence by devouring the victim's body, unwittingly awakening his Origin of "Consumption." Encouraged by Souren's words, Lio began to commit murders while dressed as Shiki, hoping that Shiki, the girl he loves, would succumb to her murderous impulses and become his. Lio is one of Souren's pawns in the mission to take over Shiki's body and reach the "Root" of all things. However, Lio's mental instability is thought to have messed things up. Souren then excludes Lio from his grand plan and keeps him at bay. After Souren died at the hands of Shiki, Lio was freed and began to wander around, continuing his serial killings while disguised as Shiki to lure her out. In the final confrontation, Shiki kills Lio in cold blood for apparently killing Mikiya.

=== Future Gospel ===
Shizune Seo (瀬尾静音, Seo Shizune)
Voiced by: Yuka Iguchi
They are able to predict the future up to three days in advance. Azaka Kokutou's roommate. Has a collie dog named Akira.
Mitsuru Kamekura (瓶倉 光溜, Kamekura Mitsuru)
Voiced by: Akira Ishida
A 14-year-old bomber in 1998. He can manipulate certain probabilities with his mystic eyes. His right eye could see its outcome, and the left showed the steps towards that path. Shiki permanently injured his right eye during a battle after "killing" Kamekura's unnatural future, where Shiki dies by his explosives. They met again by a twist of fate when he owed Shiki's criminal syndicate a huge amount of financial debt in 2008. Shiki gave him a chance to clear his debt by hiring him. He eventually works for Mikiya Kokutou's agency while keeping his main job of authoring children's stories. His work for Mikiya usually involves doing background checks, and sometimes he will be requested to partake in proper investigations. He occasionally babysits Mana, Shiki's daughter.
Mana Ryougi (両儀未那, Ryougi Mana)
Voiced by: Hisako Kanemoto
Shiki and Mikiya's daughter. An optimistic, kind, and cheerful 10-year-old girl. She knows about her mother's male personality, SHIKI (織). Her wish is to "beat her mom so she can win over her dad." Mana is attracted to things that are out of the ordinary with great amusement and jumps at the possibility of doing something interesting.
