= Tsukihime =

Japanese visual novel and its adaptations

- Visual novel cover, featuring Arcueid Brunestud

月姫
- Video game
- Developer: Type-Moon
- Publisher: Type-Moon
- Genre: Visual novel, eroge
- Engine: NScripter
- Platform: Microsoft Windows
- Released: JP: December 29, 2000
- Video game

Tsukihime Plus-Disc
- Developer: Type-Moon
- Publisher: Type-Moon
- Genre: Visual novel
- Engine: NScripter / KiriKiri
- Platform: Microsoft Windows
- Released: JP: January 2001
- Video game

Kagetsu Tohya
- Developer: Type-Moon
- Publisher: Type-Moon
- Genre: Visual novel, eroge
- Engine: NScripter
- Platform: Microsoft Windows
- Released: JP: August 2001
- Manga

Lunar Legend Tsukihime
- Written by: Sasaki Shōnen
- Published by: ASCII Media Works
- English publisher: NA: DrMaster (former)
- Magazine: Dengeki Daioh
- Original run: August 21, 2003 – July 27, 2010
- Volumes: 10
- Anime television series

Lunar Legend Tsukihime
- Directed by: Katsushi Sakurabi
- Produced by: Takeshi Jinguji; Yuichi Sekido; Yuji Matsukura
- Written by: Hiroko Tokita
- Music by: Toshiyuki Omori
- Studio: J.C.Staff
- Licensed by: AUS: Madman Entertainment; NA: Sentai Filmworks; UK: MVM Films
- Original network: BS-i
- English network: SEA: Animax Asia
- Original run: October 10, 2003 – December 26, 2003
- Episodes: 12
- Video game

Tsukihime: A Piece of Blue Glass Moon
- Developer: Type-Moon; HuneX
- Publisher: Aniplex
- Genre: Visual novel
- Platform: Nintendo Switch; PlayStation 4
- Released: PlayStation 4 & Switch: JP: August 26, 2021; WW: June 27, 2024; Microsoft Windows: WW: TBA
- Manga

Tsukihime: A Piece of Blue Glass Moon – Moon Phase
- Written by: Type-Moon; Nakatani
- Published by: Kadokawa Shoten
- Magazine: Type-Moon Comic Ace
- Original run: December 26, 2024 – March 26, 2025
- Volumes: 1
- Video game

Tsukihime: The Other Side of Red Garden
- Developer: Type-Moon
- Publisher: Aniplex
- Genre: Visual novel
- Related media
- Melty Blood; Melty Blood: Type Lumina; talk. and Prelude; Carnival Phantasm; Witch on the Holy Night; The Garden of Sinners; Tsuki no Sango
- icon

Tsukihime (月姫; lit. 'Moon Princess') is a Japanese adult visual novel game created by Type-Moon, who first released it at the Winter Comiket in December 2000. In 2003, it was adapted into both an anime television series, Lunar Legend Tsukihime, animated by J.C.Staff, and a manga series, which was serialized between 2003 and 2010 in MediaWorks shōnen manga magazine Dengeki Daioh, with ten volumes released.

Several other related media have also been released, including the bonus disc Tsukihime Plus-Disc, a fan disc Kagetsu Tohya, and the fighting game series Melty Blood. Story concepts and characters shared many similarities with other Type-Moon's series The Garden of Sinners, and the two were also subtly connected. A remake with updated art and story was announced in 2008. The first part of the remake, Tsukihime: A Piece of Blue Glass Moon, featuring a rewritten and expanded version of two of the original routes, first released in Japan in 2021, and was released worldwide in 2024. The second part, Tsukihime: The Other Side of Red Garden, was teased in a secret unlockable trailer in A Piece of Blue Glass Moon. Melty Blood: Type Lumina, a fighting game, was released worldwide on September 30, 2021, as companion to the remake titles.

== Gameplay ==
Screenshot of the gameplay. The backgrounds are often monochromatic shades of dark blue at night and lighter blues and vermillion during the day.

Tsukihime is a visual novel where the story is presented via text that intermittently presents choices for the player to make. These choices influence the story, some in large ways while others in small ones. Some choices lead to bad endings where the protagonist dies, after which the player can optionally view a comedic section called Teach Me, Ciel-sensei!, where a fourth-wall-breaking version of the character Ciel offers hints on what led to the bad ending. The game is divided into five routes, distributed amongst two scenarios: The Near Side of the Moon (Arcueid and Ciel routes), and the Far Side of the Moon (Akiha, Hisui and Kohaku routes). Every heroine except Kohaku has two possible endings. When the player has achieved all possible endings, a new epilogue part, entitled Eclipse, is unlocked.

Tsukihime remake entries are visual novels like the original, and though it features modern amenities (such as better skip functions), it plays mostly the same. The Teach Me, Ciel-sensei! section after a bad ending also returns. Unlike the original, both remakes of Near and Far sides titled Tsukihime: A Piece of Blue Glass Moon and Tsukihime: The Other Side of Red Garden are released separately:

- Tsukihime: A Piece of Blue Glass Moon solely focuses on the Near Side storyline. The Arcueid route titled Tsukihime has one ending, while Ciel route titled Midnight Rainbow has two branching endings.
- Tsukihime: The Other Side of Red Garden solely focuses on the Far Side storyline, featuring Akiha, Hisui, and Kohaku as heroines. This also adds an additional route not included in the original game featuring Satsuki Yumizuka, exploring events previously left unexplored in the series' fighting game follow up Melty Blood.

== Story ==
=== Setting ===
The game's plot follows the perspective of protagonist Shiki Tohno (遠野 志貴, Tōno Shiki), a second-year high school student in the fictional town of Misaki. He suffers a life-threatening injury at a young age. After regaining consciousness, he gains the ability to see "Death lines"—lines by which things, living or not, will eventually break when they die. Due to his injury, Shiki has immense headaches as his mind cannot cope with the sight of death. Soon after he is given special glasses from Aoko Aozaki that block the sight of these lines. Due to his injury, Shiki is exiled by his father to a branch family of the Tohno household. Eight years later, he returns to accompany his sister after his father died. After moving back, Shiki has trouble adjusting to the old-fashioned lifestyle his sister lives by. As the game progresses, Shiki confronts supernatural beings such as mostly two different types of vampires ("True Ancestor" (真祖, Shinsō), a natural-born vampire race; and Dead Apostles (死徒, Shito), a race of former humans who were mutated into vampires via magecraft or being bitten by a vampire), as well as his family's secret and his actual past.

As with many Type-Moon works, Tsukihime takes place in the shared "Nasuverse" universe and is set many years after the events of Witch on the Holy Night. The original 2000 release takes place in the fictional town of Misaki in 1999, with the events of Witch on the Holy Night being a prequel that explores the backstory of Shiki's teacher Aoko Aozaki. The 2024 remake takes place in the fictional city of Soya in 2014 and serves as a direct sequel to the 2022 remastered version of Witch on the Holy Night instead.

=== Plot ===
==== A Piece of Blue Glass Moon ====
After a horrible accident that hospitalized him, a young Shiki Tohno awakens to his Mystic Eyes of Death Perception. He is guided by a now older Aoko Aozaki that his powers were a gift and to be used for good one day, giving him a pair of glasses that would deactivate his Eyes so long he was wearing them. After being discharged, Shiki is exiled by the Tohno Family and sent to live with his relatives.

Arcueid Brunestud Route

Seven years later, Shiki returns to Soya City upon the death of his estranged father, Makihisa. As a child, Shiki was meant to be heir of the family, but was expelled after an accident that left him anemic, and his younger sister Akiha became the heir. At the same time, the city is plagued with a series of serial killings by a vampire known as Vlov Archangel, who kills Shiki's homeroom teacher, creating an opportunity for the vacant spot to be filled by Noel Aizome, a vampire hunting Executor working for the Church.

After an anemic attack causing him to lose control of himself, Shiki inadvertently kills a True Ancestor vampire, Arcueid Brunesud, who later self-revives out of anger and convinces Shiki to find Vlov. Despite their success in defeating Vlov, Arcueid reveals that the true serial killer was not only Vlov, but another vampire named Michael Roa Valdamjong, who can reincarnate after death and has seemingly selected Shiki to be his next host.

As Ciel, an upperclassman of Shiki, makes herself known as a member of the Executors, she reluctantly works with Shiki and Arcueid to drive Roa out of his hiding spot underneath their school, who has taken the reincarnation of Shiki's childhood friend of the same name and possessed similar Mystic Eyes. However, Shiki's variant of the eyes prove superior, allowing him to secure victory over Roa and negate his reincarnation ability permanently. One month after Roa's defeat, Shiki returns to a normal life and Arcueid returns to her homeland.

Ciel Normal Route

After Shiki forms his first alliance with Arcueid, he allegedly ignores her advice of attacking Vlov at night and instead pursues him during the day, which results in him being thrown into Vlov's underground catacomb. He finds both Noel and Ciel there on an official Church operation, but he and Noel are temporarily buried under rubble after an attack. While Ciel fights with Vlov, Arcueid does not help the Executors, but her last minute technique to contain Vlov within his area after Ciel's Bounded Field shatters helps Shiki and Ciel obtain victory, and defeat Vlov.

The next day, Arcueid secretly kills Roa, while Shiki believes that Vlov's death marked the end of the murders. Arcueid tells Shiki about how she killed Roa and requests he help her nightly to clean up his leftover zombies. Their excursions raise concerns for Ciel, who after following Shiki to one of his meetings with Arcueid, results in her fighting the True Ancestor.

Noel begins frantically trying to prove herself by killing more vampires as a result of having been threatened with reassignment, due to her poor recent performance. However, Ciel humiliates her in battle, leaving Noel to undergo vampire transformation herself.

After Arcueid leaves, Ciel is horrified to learn from Shiki that Roa has been killed, leading her to explain that Shiki is Roa's next host. Upon learning this, Shiki begins sleepwalking to the point he has killed humans, later realizing that Roa was beginning to surface. Shiki desperately calls Ciel for help, but she responds with full combat, having ascertained that Shiki was too deep into his infection. However, Shiki manages to prove his humanity and love for Ciel, convincing her to want and help him fight the infection. This angers Noel, who in her new Dead Apostle form, targets the two with personal vendetta, as Ciel is revealed to have been a former Roa host herself who killed Noel's family many years ago.

After Noel's defeat, Shiki's attempt to recover from the fight and trying to suppress Roa, is taken advantage of by Arcueid, who offers to turn him into a vampire, but he refuses and instead takes advantage of the situation and cuts Arcueid's line. This causes Arcueid to lose control and Shiki is saved by Ciel, who is then overwhelmed by Arcueid. Shiki, accessing Roa's memories, reaches out to Arcueid and convinces her to return home.

As Shiki lies dying, he cuts his own line to kill himself and Roa, but Shiki is unexpectedly revived by Ciel at the cost of her own life force. In a dream, Ciel explains to Shiki what she did and why. A year and a half later, Shiki decides to join the Church in search of a way to reunite with Ciel once again.

Ciel Extra Route

The route diverges after Ciel and Shiki escape into the school. Arcueid takes longer to resurrect, allowing Ciel time to prepare her role and meet her in the city. However, within three minutes of their fight, Arcueid's power proves to be overwhelming for Ciel as she ultimately takes on a giant luminous form powered by the planet, which distorts reality.

Ciel is trapped and tortured multiple times in Arcueid's giant luminous hand. With the amount of lumina energy being extorted by Arcueid, it allows Shiki to directly converse with Roa, who advises him on how to fight Arcueid while helping him stay focused. As Arcueid dies the longer she maintains her luminous form, Shiki decides to prevent that from happening. Roa ultimately decides to give up his reincarnating essence to allow Shiki to do just that, as Shiki uses the remaining of Ciel's celestial arrow energy to finish the job. After the battle, Shiki and Arcueid banter, before Arcueid returns to her homeland.

After Shiki awakens in a dream where Ciel does not exist, an incarnation of his young seven-year-old self attempts to convince to stay in that dream, as he would either be stuck in a lifelong coma or die. Shiki chooses to return to his mortal body and awaken in the real world. He reconciles with Ciel and they embark on a new life together.

== Development ==
The original story of Tsukihime was based on one of Kinoko Nasu's ideas for a novel. It featured Arcueid as a cold stereotypical vampire that is the complete opposite of her finished incarnation. The basis for Shiki was a middle-aged old, worn-down vampire who says to Arcueid upon her first approach "I have no interest in women I've already killed once." The tone of the story was the complete opposite and only the tagline of "a biting relationship between a murderer who can see death lines and a vampire" remained in the final version. Upon developing the story for Tsukihime, they pictured Arcueid as a cool and princess-like "Noble Vampire", but thought that it overlapped with Akiha's "Lady" character. All of the heroines spoke politely to the main character, so they figured that the only character who could fit the role of someone who didn't speak politely would be Arcueid. They eventually came up with the idea of a "pure white" vampire that developed her character very differently from the original version. There was originally a planned Satsuki route for the original version, but it was later cut.

Several trial versions of Tsukihime were released before its full release. The first preview version of Tsukihime was a free promotional version of which 300 copies (on 3½ floppy disks) were produced and distributed at Comiket 56 in 1999. At the next Comiket 57 in late 1999, a demo, the Tsukhime Trial Edition (月姫 体験版), was sold for 100 yen, with only 50 being produced and sold, also distributed on 3½ floppy disks. At Comiket 58 in 2000, Tsukihime Half Moon Edition was released. 300 copies were produced and sold for 1,000 yen each. This version contained Arcueid and Ciel's "Near Side of the Moon" storylines. The half moon edition came with bonuses including a coupon that would allow purchasers to claim the complete edition in the future. The complete edition of Tsukihime was first released at Comiket 59 in December 2000. In February 2026, a fan and private collector known as Keripo reported that one of the 50 existing floppy disk copies of the 1999 Trial Edition, which they had purchased for their collection with the intention of displaying it publicly as part of a Type-Moon museum exhibit, had been destroyed by United States Customs and Border Protection personnel while in transit to their home.

Type-Moon released Tsukihime Plus-Disc developed with NScripter engine in January 2001, a light-hearted addition to Tsukihime that featured two short stories: Alliance Of Illusionary Eyes and Geccha. The first edition included wallpapers, the first four chapters of The Garden of Sinners, an early demo version of Tsukihime, a contemporary Tsukihime demo, and two omakes featuring Tsukihime characters. The second edition Tsukihime Plus+Disc added two more stories: Geccha 2 and Kinoko's Masterpiece Experimental Theater. This version used the more capable KiriKiri engine. In April 2003, Type-Moon released Tsuki-Bako (月箱; lit. 'Moon Box'), a three-disc set that included Tsukihime, Tsukihime Plus+Disc, Kagetsu Tohya, a remixed soundtrack, a trial version of Melty Blood and other assorted multimedia.

In December 2001, the doujin circle Inside-Cap released an officially licensed program for Windows 98/Me/2000/XP, Rinkai Tsukihime, that allowed customers to convert their PC copy of Tsukihime into a Game Boy Advance rom; the program was distributed via CD-ROM through retail and online shops.

=== Remake ===
A remake of Tsukihime was announced in 2008, with work commencing in 2012. Work was then suspended in 2013 due to Type Moon's work on Fate/Grand Order, before resuming in 2017. It was later announced that it would be released in two parts, with the first, titled Tsukihime: A Piece of Blue Glass Moon, containing the "Near-side" part of the game. The game was released on PlayStation 4 and Nintendo Switch consoles on August 26, 2021, in Japan. The theme songs Seimeisen and Juvenile, as well as the ending themes Lost and Believer were written, composed and arranged by Kegani from Live Lab and performed by Reona, and released on CD on September 1, 2021. The soundtrack was composed by Hideyuki Fukasawa and Keita Haga, and was released as a set of eight CDs on November 24, 2021. Tsukihime: The Other Side of Red Garden, containing the remake's equivalent of the "Far-side" part of the original, was teased in an unlockable secret trailer in Tsukihime: A Piece of Blue Glass Moon.

The remake modernizes the setting of Tsukihime, having it take place in a large city in 2014 (as opposed to the suburban town in 1999 of the original), and also makes changes to the plot. The remake also adds new characters, voice acting, and new character designs. Writer Kinoko Nasu has stated in interviews that he was inspired by Evangelion: 1.0 You Are (Not) Alone to make the changes, and when writing the remake, Arcueid's route was written to be a reproduction of the old Tsukihime, while Ciel's route was written to be new. It also includes the Satsuki route.

At Anime Expo 2023, it was announced that the Tsukihime remake entries would get official localization outside Japan, starting from A Piece of Blue Glass Moon on June 27, 2024. It is also confirmed in Type-Moon Ace Vol. 15 that Windows version of the Tsukihime remake entries will be included as well.

=== Sequel ===
Kagetsu Tohya has teasers for a Tsukihime 2, and writer Kinoko Nasu's short stories "talk." and "Prelude" from Tsukihime material book's Plus Period published on October 22, 2004, and the Type-Moon's Character material published on August 20, 2006, are set before it. References to it have been mostly been made into jokes during recent interviews, and they have displayed no current plans to actually create the project. According to Character material, the sequel would have been called Tsukihime: The Dark Six and would have revolved, at least in part, around a ritual gathering of Dead Apostle ancestors. Arcueid's sister Altrouge would have had a possible role.

== Related media ==
=== Video games ===
Kagetsu Tohya is a sequel released in August 2001 and set one year after the events in the main Tsukihime storyline. Shiki gets into an accident and has a repeating dream sequence in which he must relive the same day over until he finds Len. As the player repeats each day they are able to make different choices which affect the flow of the narrative and unlock extra content in the game, including ten short stories.

Melty Blood is a PC dojin fighting game series developed by Type-Moon and French-Bread, originally released at Comiket 63 in 2002. The game features characters from the Tsukihime games as well as new characters specific for the games. Multiple updated versions of the game have been created as well as a sequel. It later spawned an arcade version, titled Act Cadenza, that was developed by Ecole Software and was then ported to the PlayStation 2. A decade later, Type-Moon and French-Bread collaborated once again to develop the fifth installment and reboot, Melty Blood: Type Lumina, featuring the characters from the remake titles.

=== Anime ===
A 12-episode anime television series adaptation titled Lunar Legend Tsukihime (真月譚 月姫, Shingetsutan Tsukihime) was directed by Katsushi Sakurabi and produced by J.C.Staff. It was written by Hiroko Tokita and features original music by Toshiyuki Ōmori. It first aired between October 10 to December 26, 2003, on BS-i. It also aired on Animax Asia in Southeast Asia and South Asia. Two pieces of theme music are used for the episodes; one opening theme and one ending theme. The opening theme was titled "The Sacred Moon" by Toshiyuki Omori, and the ending theme was "Rinne no Hate ni" (輪廻の果てに) by Fumiko Orikasa. The reason for choosing "Lunar Legend Tsukihime" instead of the title "Tsukihime" is that the trademark of "Tsukihime" had already been used.

Geneon announced it had licensed the series for distribution in North America in 2004 under the title Tsukihime, Lunar Legend. Upon Geneon's American operations having shut down, the newly instituted licensor Sentai Filmworks acquired the North American rights to the series, with Section23 Films handling its distribution and marketing, along with other titles.

=== Manga ===
A manga adaptation using the same Lunar Legend Tsukihime title as the anime, illustrated by Sasaki Shōnen, was serialized in ASCII Media Works' shōnen manga magazine Dengeki Daioh between October 2003 and September 2010 issues. The plot largely follows the game's Arcueid route with a mix of the other routes. The chapters were collected in ten volumes published by ASCII Media Works. Tsukihime creator Kinoko Nasu has praised Sasaki's manga, saying that the settings mentioned in Tsukihime and Kagetsu Tohya are integrated without damaging the atmosphere of the original. Nasu also went on to say that Sasaki Shonen's manga was the greatest rival to the remake game project, and that Sasaki's stamp of approval after he playtested it meant there was "nothing to be afraid of". The manga was licensed for an English-language release in North America by ComicsOne in 2004. In 2005, DR Master took over the publication of ComicsOne's manga titles including Tsukihime. Six out of ten volumes were published.

Tsuki no Sango is a short story by Kinoko Nasu for Maaya Sakamoto's Full Moon Recital Hall, a project organized by the Japanese online magazine Saizensen, that consisted of Sakamoto reading short novels in a theater while an accompanying short animation was aired in the background. Tsuki no Sango was the first of the recitals on December 21, 2010, and it was aired live on Ustream. The short movie was animated by Ufotable, which also animated The Garden of Sinners and Fate/Zero, and features drawings by Takashi Takeuchi and Chihiro Aikura. The animation used Frédéric Chopin composed music. The concept is "Tsukihime 3000" and the Princess Kaguya folktale. There is also a 42-page booklet version of the story with illustrations by Takeuchi and Aikura. Tsuki no Sango also got a manga adaptation with story and art by Sasaki Shōnen. It was serialized on the Saizensen web magazine from July 7, 2012, until January 22, 2019. The chapters were compiled into two tankobon volumes published by Seikaisha Comics. The first volume was released on March 10, 2014, and the second volume on May 26, 2019. An omnibus version was also published on May 26, 2019.

==== Lunar Legend Tsukihime ====
No.	Japanese release date	Japanese ISBN
1	May 27, 2004	4-8402-2717-9
2	January 27, 2005	4-8402-2958-9
3	November 26, 2005	4-8402-3255-5
4	August 26, 2006	4-8402-3575-9
5	July 27, 2007	978-4-8402-3965-3
6	March 27, 2008	978-4-8402-4252-3
7	February 27, 2010	978-4-0486-8432-3
8	March 27, 2010	978-4-0486-8510-8
9	September 27, 2010	978-4-0486-8895-6
10	December 18, 2010	978-4-0487-0190-7

==== Tsukihime: A Piece of Blue Glass Moon – Moon Phase ====
No.	Japanese release date	Japanese ISBN
1	June 25, 2025	978-4-04-116339-9

== Music ==
A remake of the visual novel's soundtrack was released on February 24, 2004, titled Ever After ~Music from "Tsukihime" Reproduction~. Two soundtrack compilations were released for the anime Lunar Legend Tsukihime, titled Moonlit Archives and Moonlit Memoirs. The music was composed by Keita Haga. The Tsukihime: A Piece of Blue Glass Moon theme songs by Reona were released on CD on September 1, 2021 while the eight disc soundtrack, which was composed by Keita Haga and Hideyuki Fukasawa, was released on November 24, 2021.

Game themes
Title	Composition, Arrangement and Lyrics	Performance	Type
"Seimeisen"	Kegani (Live Lab)	Reona	Opening theme (A Piece of Blue Glass Moon, Tsukihime route)
"Juvenile"	Kegani (Live Lab)	Reona	Opening theme (A Piece of Blue Glass Moon, Rainbow in the Night route)
"Lost"	Kegani (Live Lab)	Reona	Ending theme (A Piece of Blue Glass Moon, Tsukihime route)
"Believer	Kegani (Live Lab)	Reona	Ending theme (A Piece of Blue Glass Moon, Rainbow in the Night route)

Anime themes
Title	Composition and Arrangement	Lyrics	Performance	Type
"The Sacred Moon"	Toshiyuki Omori			Opening theme
"The End of the Cycle of Reincarnation..."	Yoko Ueno	Makoto Iriyama	Fumiko Orikasa	Ending theme

== Reception ==
Following its release, Tsukihime: A Piece of Blue Glass Moon sold 72,237 units on the Nintendo Switch and 66,171 units on the PlayStation 4, bringing it to a total of 138,408 copies sold at retail; this does not include download sales.

Tsukihime: A Piece of Blue Glass Moon was very well received by English-language media. The narrative, production quality, and localization were all praised by reviewers. and it was (as of July 26, 2024) the highest-rated 2024 game on OpenCritic, with a 90 on Metacritic, indicating "universal acclaim".

The manga series has shown high sales figures in its later volumes, with volume seven staying in the Japanese comic ranking for two weeks, while volume eight stayed in for three weeks.

Carlos Santos of Anime News Network's opinion on the anime's third DVD release is that it "is a show that's all about creating a mood, which it does very well with its carefully planned color schemes and evocative music score." He states, "It's an ending that takes its time, however, as this show's deliberate pacing ensures that the story is revealed only to those who are patient enough."
