= The Garden of Sinners =

1998–1999 Japanese light novel series by Kinoko Nasu

- Cover of the first The Garden of Sinners novel, featuring Shiki Ryougi

空の境界 (Kara no Kyōkai)
- Genre: Dark fantasy; Philosophical fiction
- Light novel
- Written by: Kinoko Nasu
- Illustrated by: Takashi Takeuchi
- Published by: Type-Moon (original creator); Kodansha (commercial publisher)
- Original run: October 1998 – August 1999
- Volumes: 2 (2004 printing); 3 (2007–2008 printing) + 2 short stories
- Anime film series
- Directed by: Various: Ei Aoki (ep. 1) Takuya Nonaka (ep. 2) Mitsuru Obunai (ep. 3) Teiichi Takiguchi (ep. 4) Takayuki Hirao (ep. 5) Takahiro Miura (ep. 6) Shinsuke Takizawa (ep. 7) Tomonori Sudou (ep. 8)
- Produced by: Hikaru Kondo; Atsuhiro Iwakami; Takashi Takeuchi
- Written by: Masaki Hiramatsu (ep. 1–7); Akira Hiyama (ep. 8)
- Music by: Yuki Kajiura
- Studio: Ufotable
- Licensed by: AUS: Madman Entertainment; NA: Aniplex of America; UK: MVM Films
- Released: December 1, 2007 – September 28, 2013
- Runtime: 45-121 minutes: 50 minutes (ep. 1) 59 minutes (ep. 2) 57 minutes (ep. 3) 45 minutes (ep. 4) 113 minutes (ep. 5) 58 minutes (ep. 6) 121 minutes (ep. 7) 88 minutes (ep. 8)
- Films: 8
- Films
- I: Overlooking View; II: A Study in Murder, Part 1; III: Remaining Sense of Pain; IV: The Hollow Shrine; V: Paradox Spiral; VI: Oblivion Recording; VII: A Study in Murder, Part 2; VIII: Future Gospel
- Anime film

Gate of 7th Heaven
- Directed by: Various
- Produced by: Hikaru Kondo; Atsuhiro Iwakami; Takashi Takeuchi
- Written by: Masaki Hiramatsu
- Music by: Yuki Kajiura
- Studio: Ufotable
- Licensed by: AUS: Madman Entertainment; NA: Aniplex of America; UK: MVM Films
- Released: March 14, 2009
- Runtime: 61 minutes
- Original video animation

Epilogue
- Directed by: Hikaru Kondo
- Produced by: Hikaru Kondo; Atsuhiro Iwakami; Takashi Takeuchi
- Written by: Masaki Hiramatsu
- Music by: Yuki Kajiura
- Studio: Ufotable
- Licensed by: AUS: Madman Entertainment; NA: Aniplex of America; UK: MVM Films
- Released: February 2, 2011
- Runtime: 33 minutes
- Anime television series

TV Edition
- Directed by: Various
- Produced by: Toukubo Eita; Ishikawa Takaki; Kodama Yoshie
- Written by: Masaki Hiramatsu
- Music by: Yuki Kajiura
- Studio: Ufotable
- Original network: Tokyo MX, Niconico, BS11, Bandai Channel, Asahi Broadcasting Corporation, Animax
- Original run: July 6, 2013 – September 28, 2013
- Episodes: 13
- Anime film

Future Gospel: Extra Chorus
- Directed by: Tomonori Sudou
- Produced by: Hikaru Kondo; Atsuhiro Iwakami; Takashi Takeuchi
- Written by: Akira Hiyama
- Music by: Yuki Kajiura
- Studio: Ufotable
- Licensed by: AUS: Madman Entertainment; NA: Aniplex of America
- Released: September 28, 2013
- Runtime: 32 minutes
- Manga
- Written by: Tenkuu Sphere
- Published by: Seikaisha
- Magazine: Saizensen
- Original run: September 15, 2010 – present
- Volumes: 12

The Garden of Sinners, known in Japan as Kara no Kyōkai (空の境界; lit. 'Boundary of Emptiness') sometimes referred to as Rakkyo (らっきょ), is a Japanese light novel series, written by Kinoko Nasu and illustrated by Takashi Takeuchi. Originally released as a series of chapters released independently online or at Comiket between October 1998 and August 1999, the chapters were later republished by Kodansha into two volumes in 2004, and again in three volumes between 2007 and 2008.

Ufotable produced a series of seven films based on the series between 2007 and 2009 and also produced an original video animation episode in 2011. A final anime film was produced and released in 2013. A manga adaptation illustrated by Sphere Tenku started serialization in September 2010 in Seikaisha's online magazine Saizensen.

== Plot ==
=== Story and setting ===
Set in Japan predominantly during the late 1990s, The Garden of Sinners follows the story of Shiki Ryougi (両儀式, Ryōgi Shiki), a teenage girl raised as a demon hunter who acquired the "Mystic Eyes of Death Perception" after surviving a fatal accident. It also chronicles Mikiya Kokutou's unwavering efforts to get closer to her when they were still high school students and their adventures later on in dealing with supernatural cases as investigators for Touko Aozaki's detective agency, Garan no Dou.

This is set in an alternate universe to Tsukihime and Fate/stay night; in which it serves as the prototype for both series as well as introducing many of the concepts prevalent within the latter two. The main protagonist, Shiki Ryougi, particularly possesses similar abilities as Tsukihime's protagonist, Shiki Tohno. Touko Aozaki's sister, Aoko Aozaki, is also featured briefly in Tsukihime.

As one of Kinoko Nasu's earliest works, it introduces some of the most fundamental concepts in the universe of Type-Moon's works, including souls, the Akashic Record/Root, Counter Force, Magic, Magecraft, and Mystic Eyes.

| Real world release order | Name of work | Chronological order |
|---|---|---|
| 1 | Overlooking View | 5 |
| 2 | A Study in Murder – Part 1 | 1 |
| 3 | Remaining Sense of Pain | 3 |
| 4 | The Hollow Shrine | 2 |
| 5 | Paradox Spiral | 6 |
| 6 | Oblivion Recording | 7 |
| 7 | A Study in Murder – Part 2 | 8 |
| 8 | Epilogue | 9 |
| 9 | Future Gospel | 4 (Note: During the events of Möbius Ring (Japanese: メビウスリング, Hepburn: Mebiusuringu)) and 11 (Note: During the events of Möbius Link (Japanese: メビウスリンク, Hepburn: Mebiusurinku)) |
| 10 | Future Gospel: Extra Chorus | 3.5, 5.5 and 6.5 |
| 11 | Final Record | 10 |

=== Themes ===
The series deals with the paranormal and tackles mature topics, including incest, murder, patricide, rape, and suicide. Its lore and story draws inspiration from various religious philosophies and psychological concepts, including multiple personalities, the Anima and animus, the nature of sin, life, death and reincarnation, and the Paradoxical nature of the Taiji.

== Media ==
=== Light novels ===
The Garden of Sinners originated in October 1998 as a series of five chapters released online on Nasu and Takeuchi's dōjin-based website, Takebōki (竹箒), with its final two chapters being released at Comiket 56 in August 1999. Nasu and Takeuchi later formed Type-Moon, and in 2001, featured the first four chapters of the book on their 2001 Tsukihime bonus disk, Tsukihime Plus-Disk, which led The Garden of Sinners to gain significant popularity, leading it to be released as a dōjinshi publication at Comiket 61 on December 30, 2001. On August 6, 2004, Kodansha released the series as a commercial publication, which enjoyed immense popularity, with 5,000 limited-edition versions of the novel being sold almost immediately upon release. Both editions of The Garden of Sinners altogether sold more than 700,000 copies. A chapter, Final Record, was distributed as a bonus for the Future Gospel film.

Del Rey Manga announced the English publication of the light novel series. This was confirmed in the first volume of Del Rey's Faust released on August 19, 2008. However, the publisher became defunct before it could happen.

| No. | Japanese release date | Japanese ISBN |
|---|---|---|
| 1 | November 15, 2007 | 978-4-06-275892-5 |
"Overlooking View" (俯瞰風景, Fukan Fūkei)/"Thanatos"; "A Study in Murder (Part 1)" (殺人考察(前), Satsujin Kōsatsu (Zen)); "Remaining Sense of Pain" (痛覚残留, Tsūkaku Zanryū)/"Ever Cry, Never Life"
| 2 | December 14, 2007 | 978-4-06-275920-5 |
"The Hollow Shrine" (伽藍の洞, Garan no Dō); "Intermission" (境界式, Kyōkai-shiki); "Paradox Spiral" (矛盾螺旋, Mujun Rasen)/"Paradox Paradigm"
| 3 | January 16, 2008 | 978-4-06-275946-5 |
"Oblivion Recording" (忘却録音, Bōkyaku Rokuon)/"Fairytale"; "A Study in Murder (Part 2)" (殺人考察(後), Satsujin Kōsatsu (Go))/"Nothing Heart"; "Epilogue" (終章/空の境界, Owari Shō/Kara no Kyōkai)/"Boundary of Emptiness"

==== Short stories ====
| No. | Title | Japanese release date | Japanese ISBN |
|---|---|---|---|
| 1 | Future Gospel 未来福音 | Comiket 74, August 16, 2008 (doujin); November 11, 2011 (Kodansha) | 978-4-06-138919-9 |
| 2 | Final Record 終末録音 | September 28, 2013 (Future Gospel film bonus); January 30, 2018 (Kodansha hardcover) | 978-4-06-511014-0 |

=== Manga ===
A manga adaptation of the novel series written and illustrated by Tenkuu Sphere is currently being serialized in Saizensen web magazine since September 15, 2010. The original writer Kinoko Nasu and artist Takashi Takeuchi supervised the work. The tankobon volumes are published by Seikaisha.

| No. | Japanese release date | Japanese ISBN |
|---|---|---|
| 1 | November 11, 2011 | 978-4-06-369501-4 |
| 2 | July 10, 2012 | 978-4-06-369506-9 |
| 3 | July 10, 2013 | 978-4-06-369508-3 |
| 4 | September 10, 2014 | 978-4-06-369517-5 |
| 5 | August 11, 2015 | 978-4-06-369534-2 |
| 6 | July 22, 2016 | 978-4-06-369554-0 |
| 7 | September 9, 2017 | 978-4-06-369582-3 |
| 8 | August 11, 2018 | 978-4-06-512000-2 |
| 9 | August 1, 2019 | 978-4-06-516695-6 |
| 10 | June 12, 2020 | 978-4-06-520433-7 |
| 11 | April 28, 2022 | 978-4-06-527758-4 |
| 12 | December 13, 2023 | 978-4-06-533269-6 |

=== Drama CD ===
On August 9, 2002, a drama CD written by Ōmori Rice (大森ごはん, Ōmori Gohan) based on the Overlooking View chapter was released.

=== Anime films ===
The series was adapted into an anime film series, divided into seven chapters, which were animated by the studio Ufotable. The films are released in achronological order. The first chapter, titled Overlooking View (俯瞰風景, Fukan Fūkei), premiered across Japanese theaters on December 1, 2007, with the second, third, fourth, fifth, sixth, and seventh chapters, Murder Speculation – Part 1 (殺人考察(前), Satsujin Kōsatsu (Zen)), Remaining Sense of Pain (痛覚残留, Tsūkaku Zanryū), The Hollow Shrine (伽藍の洞, Garan no Dō), Paradox Spiral (矛盾螺旋, Mujun Rasen), Oblivion Recording (忘却録音, Bōkyaku Rokuon), Murder Speculation (Part 2) (殺人考察(後), Satsujin Kōsatsu (Go)) being released shortly afterwards on December 29, 2007, followed by January 26, 2008, May 24, 2008, August 16, 2008, December 20, 2008, and August 8, 2009, respectively. A compilation film of the first six films with some new footage was released on March 14, 2009, in preparation for the release of the final seventh film. Connecting to the film's release, the novels were once again reprinted, as three volumes with new illustrations. A North American premiere of the fifth chapter was held on May 22, 2009, at the Anime Boston convention.

The series was released on Blu-ray with a new chapter, Gekijōban Kara no Kyōkai Shūshō: Kara no Kyōkai, in Japanese with English subtitles. A DVD of the said chapter was released on February 2, 2011. Aniplex of America released the imported Blu-ray box set on February 8, 2011. The box was immediately sold out and has not been reissued since. However, the individual films were available for rent on the PlayStation Network until mid-2012. A new limited edition DVD boxset was released in late 2012. Likewise, Madman Entertainment released a limited edition DVD boxset in October 2013.

An eighth film, Future Gospel (空の境界 未来福音, Kara no Kyōkai: Mirai Fukuin), was released in September 2013 and had grossed US$1,710,413 by October 20. Aniplex of America has released Future Gospel (now subtitled Recalled Out Summer) and Future Gospel (Extra Chorus) on Blu-ray in late April 2015. Aniplex has also released the Japanese import of all seven films on Blu-ray in November 2015.

==== Releases ====
- The Garden of Sinners: Overlooking View (2007 (original) / 2013 (3D remake)
- The Garden of Sinners: A Study in Murder – Part 1 (2007)
- The Garden of Sinners: Remaining Sense of Pain (2008)
- The Garden of Sinners: The Hollow Shrine (2008)
- The Garden of Sinners: Paradox Spiral (2008)
- The Garden of Sinners: Oblivion Recording (2008)
- The Garden of Sinners: A Study in Murder – Part 2 (2009)
- The Garden of Sinners: Future Gospel (2013)

==== Other films ====
| Type | Title | Directed by | Original release date |
|---|---|---|---|
| Remix | "Gate of Seventh Heaven" | Various directors | March 14, 2009 |
Timeline: August 1995 – January 1999 This remix collection extracts the key themes and scenes from the first six films. The hour-long one is organized in chronological order, beginning from the second film, then the fourth, third, first, fifth, and sixth. It is a mixture of primarily existing scenes and some new ones.
| OVA | "Epilogue" | Hikaru Kondo | February 8, 2011 |
Timeline: March 1999 Mikiya finds Shiki in the same place he first met her, this time in the snow. They talk, and during the discussion, Mikiya finds out that he is talking to Shiki Ryogi, the shell, or archetype, of Shiki. She explains that her origin is nothingness, and she is somehow tied to the Spiral of Origin. Because of her emptiness, she desired no interaction with the world, creating the personalities of SHIKI and Shiki. She also explains that she is the reason that Shiki still has murderous impulses, not Shiki. She then asks Mikiya what he wishes for (principally, healing his wounds from Shirazumi), as she has the power to grant it from her connection to the Spiral of Origin, but he desires nothing. He is content as he is and does not wish to be extraordinary. They talk at length about humanity and the soul, and she says she will "sleep" forever. However, as she leaves, she says that such a thought is "silly" as she knows she will see him tomorrow. Mikiya, now standing alone, walks home. In chronology, the events that occur in Epilogue are the ninth in the series timeline.
| Short–film | "Future Gospel: Extra Chorus" "Mirai Fukuin: Extra Chorus" (未来福音 EXTRA CHORUS) | Tomonori Sudou | September 28, 2013 |
Timeline: 1998 Side-story adaptation of the manga by Takashi Takeuchi. Premiered and sold with Future Gospel. A compilation of short stories occurring in-between the original chapters: "Feline" after Remaining Sense of Pain, "Daylight" after Overlooking View, and "Say Grace" after Paradox Spiral.

==== Theme songs ====
Film themes
| Title | Composition, Arrangement and Lyrics | Performance | Type |
|---|---|---|---|
| "Oblivious" | Yuki Kajiura | Kalafina | Ending theme (Overlooking View) |
| "You Turn into Light" (君が光に変えて行く, Kimi ga Hikari ni Kaete Iku) | Yuki Kajiura | Kalafina | Ending theme (A Study in Murder: Part 1) |
| "Scars" (傷跡, Kizuato) | Yuki Kajiura | Kalafina | Ending theme (Remaining Sense of Pain) |
| "Aria" | Yuki Kajiura | Kalafina | Ending theme (The Hollow Shrine) |
| "Sprinter" | Yuki Kajiura | Kalafina | Ending theme (Paradox Spiral) |
| "Fairytale" | Yuki Kajiura | Kalafina | Ending theme (Oblivion Recording) |
| "Seventh Heaven" | Yuki Kajiura | Kalafina | Ending theme (A Study in Murder: Part 2) |
| "Snowfalling" | Yuki Kajiura | Kalafina | Ending theme (Epilogue) |
| "Alleluia" | Yuki Kajiura | Kalafina | Ending theme (Future Gospel) |
| "Dolce" | Yuki Kajiura | Kalafina | Ending theme (Future Gospel: Extra Chorus) |
