= Kinoko Nasu =

Japanese author (born 1973)

- 奈須 きのこ
- Born: Kunihiro Nasu (奈須 國広); 28 November 1973 (age 52)
- Education: Hosei University
- Occupations: Video game designer, writer
- Years active: 1998–present
- Known for: Co-founder of Type-Moon
- Notable work: The Garden of Sinners (1998); Tsukihime (2000); Fate/stay night (2004); Witch on the Holy Night (2012)
- Website: Official blog

Kunihiro Nasu (奈須 國広, Nasu Kunihiro; born 28 November 1973), (Note: Also known as Kinoko Nasu (奈須 きのこ, Nasu Kinoko)) is a Japanese video game developer, and writer. Nasu began creating visual novels while in college, making a few small games, visual novels, and pieces of written fiction, before rising to prominence in 2000 with the release of Tsukihime. He went on to work on Fate/stay night in 2004, which quickly became a commercial success and spawned the Fate media franchise. Type-Moon released an adult visual novel spin-off called Fate/hollow ataraxia in October 2005, that expanded on the events of Fate/stay night.

Nasu co-founded the Japanese company Type-Moon, where he designed games including Tsukihime and Fate/stay night. The company specializes in production of various media, including video games, anime, and manga.

== Biography ==
Kunihiro Nasu was born on 28 November 1973. He graduated from Hosei University with a major in human science. While attending college in the 1990s, Nasu had come up with different concepts for his Fate/Stay Night novel, and began writing it. In 2000, he later co-founded the Japanese media conglomerate Type-Moon, alongside Japanese artist Takashi Takeuchi as a dōjin circle to create the visual novel Tsukihime, which soon gained popularity. After the success of Tsukihime, Type-Moon became a commercial organization. A sequel to Tsukihime, titled Kagetsu Tohya, was released for Windows PCs in August 2001.

Nasu released the eroge visual novel Fate/stay night under Type-Moon in January 2004. The game had grown in popularity and spawned the Fate media franchise, consisting of adaptations and spin-offs in various different media, including anime and manga. A sequel to Fate/stay night, Fate/hollow ataraxia, was released in October 2005. In December 2006, Nasu had released a prequel light novel to Fate/stay night, titled Fate/Zero under Type-Moon.

== Influences ==
Nasu has stated his influences as Hideyuki Kikuchi, Yukito Ayatsuji, Soji Shimada, Natsuhiko Kyogoku, Kenji Takemoto, Ken Ishikawa, and Yasuhiro Nightow.

== Works ==
Among Nasu's earlier works are the novels Kara no Kyōkai, originally released in 1998 and re-printed in 2004, Angel Notes, Mahōtsukai no Yoru and Kōri no Hana. His works are usually characterized by the worldview and specific setting shared by most of the titles.

=== Novels ===
- Mahōtsukai no Yoru (1996; unreleased) – Author
- Kōri no Hana (unreleased) – Author
- Kara no Kyōkai (1998) – Author
- Notes. (Angel Voice) (1999) – Author
- Fate/Zero (2006) – Supervisor
- Decoration Disorder Disconnection (2007) – Author
- Tsuki no Sango (Moon’s Coral) (2010) – Author
- Fate/Apocrypha (2012) – Supervisor
- Clock Tower 2015 (2014) – Author
- Garden Of Avalon (2015) – Author
- Avalon le Fae Synopsys (2022) – Author
- Mahōtsukai no Yoru (2026) – Author

=== Video games ===
Year	Title	Role
2000	Loveless ~Owaranai Monogatari~	Special scenario
2000	Tsukihime	Planning, creator, scenario writer, scenario programmer, game director
2001	Kagetsu Tohya	Planning, creator, scenario writer, scenario programming, organization, game director
2002	Melty Blood	Scenario, scenario script
2004	Fate/stay night	Planning, original idea, organization, scenario, scripting assistant, director
2005	Fate/hollow ataraxia	Planning, original idea, organization, main scenario, scenario, director
2008	428: Shibuya Scramble	Special scenario (Note: 428: Shibuya Scramble also received an anime sequel to the scenario in 2009, titled Canaan.)
2010	Fate/Extra	Scenario
2012	Mahōtsukai no Yoru	Planning, scenario, general director
2013	Fate/Extra CCC	Scenario
2015	Fate/Grand Order	Writer, supervisor, scenario
2016	Fate/Extella	Main scenario
2018	Fate/Extella Link	Scenario supervisor, original story
2021	Tsukihime -A piece of blue glass moon-	Scenario, general director
2021	Melty Blood: Type Lumina	Scenario, original story
2023	Fate/Samurai Remnant	Supervisor
2027	Fate/Extra Record	Scenario
2027	Melty Blood: Twi-Lumina	Scenario
TBA	Tsukihime -The other side of red garden-	Scenario

=== Anime ===
Year	Title	Role
2003	Lunar Legend Tsukihime	Original creator
2006	Fate/stay night	Original creator
2017	Fate/Grand Order: Moonlight/Lostroom	Script
2018	Fate/Extra Last Encore	Script, series composition, original creator

=== Films ===
Year	Title	Role
2020	Fate/Grand Order: Camelot - Wandering; Agaterám	Original creator
2021	Fate/Grand Order: Camelot - Paladin; Agaterám	Original creator
2021	Fate/Grand Order Final Singularity - Grand Temple of Time: Solomon	Original creator

== Awards and nominations ==
Year	Award	Category	Result	Ref.
2018	Tokyo Anime Awards	Best Screenplay/Original Story	Won	
