= Mamoru Miyano discography =

Mamoru Miyano (宮野 真守, Miyano Mamoru; born June 8, 1983) is a Japanese actor and singer. He made his singing debut on May 28, 2007, releasing his first single "Kuon" (久遠, Eternity) for King Records label. On March 11, 2009, Miyano released his debut album, Break. He won the "Best Singing Award" in 2014 at the 8th Seiyu Awards. Many of his songs have been used as theme music in anime television series and video games.

== Albums ==
Title	Album details	Peak chart positions	Sales
Title	Album details	JPN	Sales
Break	Released: March 11, 2009; Label: King Records; Formats: CD, digital download	20	8,518
Wonder	Released: August 4, 2010; Label: King Records; Formats: CD, digital download	20	8,217
Fantasista	Released: April 18, 2012; Label: King Records; Formats: CD, digital download	4	18,602
Passage	Released: September 18, 2013; Label: King Records; Formats: CD, digital download	6	21,578
Frontier	Released: September 16, 2015; Label: King Records; Formats: CD, digital download	3	20,369
The Love	Released: August 2, 2017; Label: King Records; Formats: CD, digital download	6	24,416
The Entertainment	Released: November 2, 2022; Label: King Records; Formats: CD, digital download	6	8,882
Face	Released: November 19, 2025; Label: King Records; Formats: CD, digital download	18	6,123

== Singles ==
#	Year	Release date	Title	Catalog no.	Chart positions	Album
#	Year	Release date	Title	Catalog no.	Oricon Singles Charts	Album
1st	2007	05/23	"Kuon"	GBCM-24	47	Break
2nd	2008	06/04	"Discovery"	KICM-1236	24	Break
3rd	2008	12/03	"...Kimi e"	KICM-1257	18	Break
4th	2009	07/29	"JS"	KICM-1283	24	Wonder
5th	2009	10/21	"Refrain"	KICM-1293	22	Wonder
6th	2010	12/08	"Hikari, Hikaru"	KICM-1324	20	Fantasista
7th	2011	07/13	"Orphée"	KICM-1344	10	Fantasista
8th	2011	11/16	"Dream Fighter"	KICM-1369	15	Fantasista
9th	2012	11/14	"Ultra Fly"	KICM-1416	13	Passage
10th	2013	04/10	"Kanon"	KICM-1439	3	Passage
11th	2014	02/19	"New Order"	KICM-1495	12	Frontier
12th	2014	11/12	"Break It"	KICM-1547	12	Frontier
13th	2015	04/15	"Shine"	KICM-1584	3	Frontier
14th	2016	01/27	"How Close You Are"	KICM-1648	7	The Love
15th	2016	05/11	"Shout"	KICM-1666	12	The Love
16th	2016	10/12	"Tempest"	KICM-1718	5	The Love
17th	2016	10/12	"The Birth"	KICM-1719	9	The Love
18th	2019	05/29	"Encore"	KICM-1947	8	The Entertainment
19th	2020	1/29	"Last Dance"	KICM-2027	8	The Entertainment
20th	2020	4/22	"Hikari Sasu Hou e"	KICM-2044	5	The Entertainment
21st	2020	12/9	"ZERO to INFINITY"	KICM-2068	10	The Entertainment
22nd	2021	5/26	"Transparent"	KICM-2087	15	The Entertainment
23rd	2021	7/7	"Dream on"	KICM-2094	12	The Entertainment
24th	2023	4/26	"Quiet explosion"	KICM-2127	16	Face
25	2023	12/13	"Sing a song together"	KICM-2145	12	Face
26	2024	7/24	"The Battle"	KICM-2154	17	Face
27	2024	12/11	"DRESSING"	KICM-2162	15	Face

== Promotional singles ==
Year	Title	Chart positions	Album
Year	Title	Oricon Singles Charts	Album
2005	"Midnight Sunshine"	–	Eyeshield 21
2006	"Make My Way"	–	
2006	"Guilty Beauty Love"	–	Ouran High School Host Club
2006	"Mata Ashita!"	–	Ouran High School Host Club
2007	"Fight!"	–	
2007	"Kanau Nara"	–	Ouran High School Host Club
2008	"Soup"	18	Mobile Suit Gundam 00
2008	"Hakosora"	–	Mobile Suit Gundam 00
2008	"Sore ga Bokura no Michishirube"	–	Soul Eater
2008	"Kagayaki ha Diamond"	–	La Corda d'Oro
2008	"December Dream"	–	La Corda d'Oro
2008	"Corona"	–	La Corda d'Oro
2009	"Bara-iro Real Face"	107	
2009	"Believe☆My Voice"	–	Uta no Prince-sama
2009	"Number Ou"	–	Fullmetal Alchemist: Brotherhood
2009	"Hikari Sasu Basho e"	–	Fullmetal Alchemist: Brotherhood
2009	"True Fortune Vol. 6" ("Infinity")	–	
2009	"Burnin' Down"	–	Skip Beat
2009	"Prisoner"	–	Skip Beat
2010	"Hoshikuzu☆shall we dance"	–	Uta no Prince-sama
2010	"Linda Linda"	–	Durarara!!
2011	"Nankoufuraku no new gate"	–	Steins;Gate
2011	"Nana-juu Okubun Ichi no Kanojo"	216	Scared Rider Xechs
2011	"Nanairo no Compass"	7	Uta no Prince-sama
2011	"My Little Little Girl"	–	Uta no Prince-sama
2011	"Maji Love 1000%"	–	Uta no Prince-sama
2011	"Roulette"	–	Uta no Prince-sama
2011	"Netsujou Serenade"	–	Uta no Prince-sama
2011	"Issho ni Hang in there"	–	Uta no Prince-sama
2011	"Superb Spirits"	–	Uta no Prince-sama
2011	"First Galaxy"	–	Star Driver: Kagayaki no Takuto
2011	"Stand up Ears (Princess & Saver Mix)"	–	Dog Days
2011	"Dearly star"	–	Dog Days
2012	"Nando mo Umarete wa Kiete Iku Yuki no You na Mono"	–	Chihayafuru
2012	"one way"	–	Inu x Boku SS
2012	"Labomen Spirits"	–	Steins;Gate
2012	"Rainbow Dream"	–	Uta no Prince-sama
2012	"1/13"	–	Hunter x Hunter
2013	"Splash Free"	–	Free!
2013	"Ever Blue"	–	Free!
2013	"Break Our Balance"	–	Free!
2013	"Aqua Gate"	–	Free!
2013	"Maji Love 2000%"	–	Uta no Prince-sama
2013	"Yume Oibito e no Symphony"	–	Uta no Prince-sama
2013	"Crystal Time"	–	Uta no Prince-sama
2013	"Independence"	–	Uta no Prince-sama
2013	"Welcome 2 Parade! Nigoutei e Youkoso!"	–	Karneval
2013	"Yakusoku no Uta"	–	Hunter x Hunter
2013	"Legend of Galaxy"	–	Ultraman Ginga
2014	"Future Fish"	–	Free!
2014	"Future Fish" (solo version)	–	Free!
2014	"Clear Blue Departure"	–	Free!
2014	"Vision"	–	Free!
2014	"Go All Out!!"	–	Free!
2014	"Real Wave"	–	Free!
2014	"Kitto Wasurenai"	–	Free!
2014	"Neo Blue Breathing"	–	Free!
2014	"Over the Dream"	–	Free!
2014	"Gratefully"	–	Free!
2014	"Decide My Fate"	–	Nobunaga the Fool
2014	"Not Lonely but Fool"	–	Nobunaga the Fool
2015	"Maji Love Revolutions"	–	Uta no Prince-sama
2015	"Original Resonance"	–	Uta no Prince-sama
2015	"Secret Lover"	–	Uta no Prince-sama
2015	"It's a Show Time"	–	Magic Kaito 1412
2015	"Righteous Thunder"	–	The Seven Deadly Sins
2015	"Julia ni Heartbreak"	–	Durarara!!
2016	"Eien Misui Ni Good By"	–	Bungou Stray Dogs
2016	"Ao to Kurenai no Forzato"	–	Scared Rider Xechs
2016	"Dan-Gun-Xechs"	–	Scared Rider Xechs
2016	"Stardust Lovers"	–	Scared Rider Xechs
2016	"Everlasting Days"	–	Days
2016	"Be My Steady"	–	Prince of Stride: Alternative
2016	"You're My Courage"	–	Prince of Stride: Alternative
2016	"Maji Love Legend Star"	–	Uta no Prince-sama
2016	"Be the Light!"	–	Uta no Prince-sama
2017	"Rising Free"	–	Free!
2017	"Free-Style Spirit"	–	Free!
2017	"What Wonderful Days!!"	–	Free!
2018	"Sotto Tokete Yuku You ni"	–	Devils' Line
2018	"Over the Limit"	–	Yowamushi Pedal: Glory Line
2018	"Kekkai"	–	Onmyoji
2018	"Gold Evolution"	–	Free!
2018	"Blue Destination"	–	Free!
2019	"Toki no Jewel"	–	Uta no Prince-sama
2019	"Target is You!"	–	Uta no Prince-sama
2019	"Brave Dream"	–	Free!
2025	"Awakening of Zero" (with voyager)	–	Ultraman New Generation Stars

== Video releases ==
	Release date	Title	Type		Oricon peak rank	
	Release date	Title	BD	DVD	BD	DVD
1	March 10, 2010	Mamoru Miyano Live Tour 2009 〜Smile & Break〜	KIXM-62	KIBM-233/4	55	20
2	April 27, 2011	Mamoru Miyano Live Tour 2010 〜Wondering!〜	KIXM-64/5	KIBM-273/4	54	37
3	August 22, 2012	Mamoru Miyano Live Tour 2011-12 〜Fight & Stand〜	KIXM-60/1	KIBM-327/8	15	35
4	June 8, 2013	Mamoru Miyano Live Tour 2012-13 〜Beginning!〜	KIXM-92/3	KIBM-361/2	3	17
5	April 23, 2014	Mamoru Miyano Special Live 2013 〜Traveling!〜	KIXM-157/8	KIBM-424/5	12	18
6	January 28, 2015	Mamoru Miyano Live Tour 2014 〜Wakening!〜	KIXM-183/4	KIBM-481/2	2	12
7	November 18, 2015	Mamoru Miyano Live Tour 2015 〜Amazing!〜	KIXM-210/1	KIBM-526/7	5	11
8	June 8, 2016	Mamoru Miyano Live Tour 2015-16 〜Generating!〜	KIXM-234/5	KIBM-574/5	4	6
9	June 14, 2017	Mamoru Miyano Live Tour 2016 〜Mixing!〜	KIXM-279/80	KIBM-655/6	1	6
10	March 21, 2018	Mamoru Miyano Live Tour 2017 〜Loving!〜	KIXM-313/4	KIBM-705/6	6	14
11	December 26, 2018	Mamoru Miyano Arena Live Tour 2018 〜Exciting!〜	KIXM-350/1	KIBM-763/4	3	13
12	April 22, 2020	Mamoru Miyano Asia Live Tour 2019 〜Blazing!〜	KIXM-427/8	KIBM-843/4		
13	May 26, 2021	Mamoru Miyano Studio Live 〜Streaming!〜	KIXM-455	KIBM-875		
14	March 9, 2022	Mamoru Miyano Comeback Live 2021 〜Reliving!〜	KIXM-491/2	KIBM-907/8		

== Music video collections ==
	Release Date	Title	Type		Oricon Peak Rank	
	Release Date	Title	BD	DVD	BD	DVD
1	July 23, 2014	Mamoru Miyano presents M&M Chronicle	KIZX-151/2	KIZB-159/60	12	21
