= Maji Love 1000% =

Single by STARISH
- A-side: "Maji Love 1000%"
- B-side: "Mirai Chizu"
- Released: July 30, 2011
- Recorded: 2011
- Genre: Anison
- Length: 15:02
- Label: King Records
- Songwriter: Noriyasu Agematsu
- Producer: Elements Garden

STARISH singles chronology
"Maji Love 1000%" (2011)	"Maji Love 2000%" (2014)

Music video
- "Maji Love 1000%" (non-text version) on YouTube

"Maji Love 1000% (マジLOVE1000%, Maji Rabu Sen Pāsento; lit. "Serious Love 1000%")" is the ending theme song of the 2011 anime series Uta no Prince-sama: Maji Love 1000%, the first season of the Uta no Prince-sama anime series. The song is performed by STARISH, a fictional Japanese idol boy band consisting of the characters Otoya Ittoki (voiced by Takuma Terashima), Tokiya Ichinose (voiced by Mamoru Miyano), Ren Jinguji (voiced by Junichi Suwabe), Masato Hijirikawa (voiced by Kenichi Suzumura), Natsuki Shinomiya (voiced by Kisho Taniyama, and Syo Kurusu (voiced by Hiro Shimono). The song was released on July 30, 2011.

== Background ==
"Maji Love 1000%" is the ending theme song of Uta no Prince-sama: Maji Love 1000% and is performed by Takuma Terashima, Mamoru Miyano, Junichi Suwabe, Kenichi Suzumura, Kisho Taniyama, and Hiro Shimono as their characters, members of the fictional Japanese idol boy band STARISH, in the show. The single was released on July 30, 2011, with the B-side "Mirai Chizu", an insert song in the show featured in episode 11.

== Music video ==
The music video features STARISH performing in front of an audience and was used for Uta no Prince-sama: Maji Love 1000%'s ending sequence. The animation for the video used around 10,000 frames. The video was originally scheduled to debut at the Akihabara UDX Theater on June 18, 2011, but was delayed until June 20.

== Performances ==
The voice actors for STARISH performed "Maji Love 1000%" and "Mirai Chizu" at the Animelo Summer Live 2012: Infinity 8.26 on August 26, 2012. On August 23, 2013, they performed "Maji Love 1000% (Rainbow Star ver.)" at Animelo Summer Live 2013: Flag Nine 8.25.

== Reception ==
The single ranked #7 on the Oricon Weekly Singles Chart. "Maji Love 1000%" was ranked #20 on Billboard Japan Hot 100 and #1 on Billboard Japan Hot Animation. By the end of 2011, the single sold over 54,000 copies and was the best-selling character song of 2011.

CD Journal compared the "freshness" of the song to Japanese idols from Johnny & Associates, stating that the song was "catchy" and "likeable." Meanwhile, Bamboo Dong from Anime News Network noted the "weird" difference between STARISH's innocent image and sexual performance, comparing the awkwardness to the line "Am I sexual?" from the Backstreet Boys' song "Everybody (Backstreet's Back)."

Takuma Terashima, Mamoru Miyano, Junichi Suwabe, Kenichi Suzumura, Kisho Taniyama, and Hiro Shimono won the award for Best Musical Performance at the 6th Seiyu Awards for their performance of the song.

== In other media ==
"Maji Love 1000%" was one of the playable songs available in Dance Evolution Arcade.

== Track listing ==
All tracks are written by Elements Garden.

No.	Title	Lyrics	Music	Arrangement	Length
1.	"Maji Love 1000%" (マジLOVE1000% lit. Serious Love 1000%)	Noriyasu Agematsu	Noriyasu Agematsu	Hitoshi Fujima	3:33
2.	"Mirai Chizu" (未来地図 lit. Map of the Future)	Noriyasu Agematsu	Masato Nakayama	Masato Nakayama	3:58
3.	"Maji Love 1000%" (Instrumental)	—	Noriyasu Agematsu	Hitoshi Fujima	3:33
4.	"Mirai Chizu" (Instrumental)	—	Masato Nakayama	Masato Nakayama	3:58
Total length:					15:02

== Charts ==
Chart (2011)	Peak position
Billboard Japan Hot 100	20
Billboard Japan Hot Animation	1
Oricon Weekly Singles Chart	7
