= Orphée (song) =

Single by Mamoru Miyano

from the album Fantasista
- Released: July 13, 2011
- Genre: J-pop; anison
- Length: 12:43
- Label: King Records
- Songwriter: Noriyasu Agematsu
- Producer: Elements Garden

Mamoru Miyano singles chronology
"Hikari, Hikaru" (2010)	"Orphée" (2011)	"Dream Fighter" (2011)

Music video
- "Orphée" on YouTube

"Orphée (オルフェ, Orufe)" is a song by Japanese voice actor and singer Mamoru Miyano and was released on July 13, 2011, as his sixth single. It was used as the opening theme song of the 2011 anime series Uta no Prince-sama: Maji Love 1000%, the first season of the Uta no Prince-sama anime series.

== Background ==
"Orphée" is the opening theme song of Uta no Prince-sama: Maji Love 1000%, which Miyano co-starred in as Tokiya Ichinose. The single was released on July 13, 2011, and also included the tracks "Moonlight" and "Stand Up Soul."

"Moonlight" served as the ending theme songs to Miyano's radio programs, Mamoru Miyano's M-1 Grand Prix! and Mamoru Miyano's Radio Smile. Miyano described "Moonlight" as a "gentle" and "emotional" song on his blog, comparing the song to the "soft moonlight" late at night.

"Stand Up Soul" was the opening theme song to Miyano's radio program, Mamoru Miyano's M-1 Grand Prix! Miyano described it as an "energetic" song, which he had written in hopes of cheering up his audience after the 2011 Tōhoku earthquake and tsunami.

== Reception ==
The single ranked #10 on the Oricon Weekly Singles Chart. "Orphée" was ranked #26 on Billboard Japan Hot 100 and #3 on Billboard Japan Hot Animation.

== Track listing ==
No.	Title	Lyrics	Music	Arrangement	Length
1.	"Orphée" (オルフェ)	Noriyasu Agematsu	Noriyasu Agematsu	Junpei Fujita	4:29
2.	"Moonlight"	STY	STY	STY	3:59
3.	"Stand Up Soul"	Mamoru Miyano	Mamoru Miyano	Ryosuke Kihara	4:15
Total length:					12:43

== Charts ==
Chart (2011)	Peak position
Billboard Japan Hot 100	26
Billboard Japan Hot Animation	3
Oricon Weekly Singles Chart	10
