= Kuon (song) =

2007 single by Mamoru Miyano

Single by Mamoru Miyano

from the album Break
- Released: May 23, 2007
- Genre: Pop
- Label: King Records
- Songwriter(s): ALCHEMY+

Mamoru Miyano singles chronology
"Kuon" (2007)	"Discovery" (2008)

"Kuon" (久遠, lit. Eternity) is Japanese voice actor Mamoru Miyano's debut single, released on May 23, 2007. It had peaked at #47 on the Oricon Singles Chart, and the title track was used as the ending to the anime Kotetsu Sangokushi.

Single
No.	Title	Lyrics	Music	Length
1.	"Kuon" (久遠 "Eternity")	ALCHEMY+	ALCHEMY+	4:16
2.	"Itsuka" (いつか "Someday")	Goro Matsui	Takuya Watanabe	4:07
3.	"Kotetsu Sangokushi Special CD Drama"			5:42
4.	"Kuon (Instrumental)"		ALCHEMY+	4:16
5.	"Itsuka (Instrumental)"		Takuya Watanabe	4:07
