= Me and My Brother =

Me and My Brother may refer to:

- Me & My Brother, the third studio album by the rap duo Ying Yang Twins
- Me and My Brother (film), a 1969 independent film which was Christopher Walken's film debut
- Me & My Brothers, a Japanese manga series by Hari Tokeino
- "Me and My Brother", a song by Erik Hill and P-Square from The Invasion
