= Refrain (disambiguation) =

A refrain is a line or lines repeated in a verse or song.

Refrain may also refer to:

- "Refrain" (Lys Assia song), winner of Eurovision 1956
- "Refrain" (Mamoru Miyano song), 2009
- Refrain (Stockhausen), a 1966 composition by Karlheinz Stockhausen
- Refrain, a 2020 album by Boris and Z.O.A
- "Refrain", a 1988 song by James from Strip-mine
- "Refrain", a 1984 song by Akina Nakamori from Possibility
- "Refrain", a 1985 song by Jose Mari Chan
