= 2nd Seiyu Awards =

2008 Japanese voice acting awards

- Awarded for: Voice acting in Japan
- Date: March 8, 2008
- Location: UDX Theater; Akihabara, Tokyo
- Country: Japan

Highlights
- Best Lead Actor: Mamoru Miyano
- Best Lead Actress: Aya Hirano
- Website: www.seiyuawards.jp

The 2nd Seiyu Awards ceremony was held on March 8, 2008, at the UDX Theater (former Akiba 3D Theater) in Akihabara, Tokyo, and was broadcast on BS11 on May 4, 2008. The period of general voting lasted from October 20, 2007, to January 15, 2008.

Winners	Agency	Characters	Anime
Best Actor in leading role
Mamoru Miyano	Himawari Theatre Group	Setsuna F. Seiei; Hakugen Rikuson	Mobile Suit Gundam 00; Koutetsu Sangokushi
Best Actress in leading role
Aya Hirano	Space Craft	Haruhi Suzumiya; Konata Izumi	The Melancholy of Haruhi Suzumiya; Lucky Star
Best Actors in supporting roles
Daisuke Ono	Mausu Promotion	Hosaka; Kagezaki	Minami-ke; Rental Magica
Hiroshi Kamiya	Aoni Production	Tieria Erde; Nozomu Itoshiki	Mobile Suit Gundam 00; Sayonara Zetsubō Sensei
Best Actresses in supporting roles
Rie Kugimiya	I'm Enterprise	Nagi Sanzenin; Shana	Hayate the Combat Butler; Shakugan no Shana
Mitsuki Saiga	Ken Production	Kei Yūki; Rossiu; Jomy Marcus Shin	Moyashimon; Tengen Toppa Gurren Lagann; Toward the Terra
Best Rookie actors
Wataru Hatano	81 Produce	Sam Houston; Tenshi Yuri	Toward the Terra; Saint Beast: Kouin Jojishi Tenshi Tan
Tsubasa Yonaga	Ken Production	Ren Mihashi; Shingo Suwa	Ookiku Furikabutte; Kishin Taisen Gigantic Formula
Best Rookie actresses
Emiri Katō	81 Produce	Momoko Akatsutsumi/Hyper Blossom; Kagami Hiiragi	Demashita! Powerpuff Girls Z Lucky Star
Yu Kobayashi	Holy Peak	Sarutobi Ayame; Kaere Kimura	Gintama; Sayonara Zetsubō Sensei
Best Personality
Winner	Agency	Radio Program	Broadcasting Station
Kenichi Suzumura	Arts Vision	Cherry Bell	JOQR
Best Musical Performance
Winners	Record Label	Song	Anime
Aya Hirano, Emiri Kato, Kaori Fukuhara, Aya Endo	Lantis	Motteke! Sailor Fuku, opening theme	Lucky Star
Special Achievement Award
Winners	Agency		
Tatsuya Jo	Haikyō (final career)		
Achievement Award
Nachi Nozawa	Ken Production		
Michio Hazama	Mouvement		
Ryoko Kinomiya	Haikyō		
Synergy Award
Kamen Rider Den-O (Toshihiko Seki, Koji Yusa, Masaki Terasoma & Kenichi Suzumura)
Kei Tomiyama Memorial Award (Topical Award)
Toru Furuya	Aoni Production		
