= Hikari, Hikaru =

Single by Mamoru Miyano
- Released: 2010
- Genre: Pop
- Length: 13:05
- Label: King Records
- Songwriters: ucio, TSUGE

Mamoru Miyano singles chronology
"Refrain" (2009)	"Hikari, Hikaru" (2010)	"Orphée" (2011)

"Hikari, Hikaru" (ヒカリ、ヒカル) is Japanese voice actor Mamoru Miyano's sixth single, released on December 8, 2010. It peaked at No. 20 on the Oricon charts.

== Track listing ==
CD
No.	Title	Lyrics	Music	Length
1.	"Hikari, Hikaru" (ヒカリ、ヒカル)	ucio	TSUGE	5:05
2.	"DISCOTIQUE09"	STY	STY	3:37
3.	"Xmas to You"	Satomi Narimoto	Ryousuke Kihara	4:23
