= Discovery (song) =

Single by Mamoru Miyano

from the album Break
- Released: June 4, 2008
- Genre: Pop
- Length: 13:51
- Label: King Records
- Songwriters: Hidenori Tanaka, Kosuke Noma

Mamoru Miyano singles chronology
"Kuon" (2007)	"Discovery" (2008)	"...Kimi e" (2008)

"Discovery" is Japanese voice actor Mamoru Miyano's second single, released as a CD on 4 June 2008. It peaked at #24 on the Oricon charts. The title track was used as the ending theme for the PlayStation 2 game Fushigi Yugi Suzaku Ibun.

== Track listing ==
CD
No.	Title	Lyrics	Music	Length
1.	"Discovery"	Hidenori Tanaka	Kosuke Noma	4:20
2.	"Garnet"	Goro Matsui	Atsushi Harada	4:51
3.	"Kimochi Tsunaide" (きもちつないで "Tied Feelings")	Tomomi Narimoto	Tomomi Narimoto	4:40
