= JS (song) =

Single by Mamoru Miyano

from the album Wonder
- Released: July 29, 2009
- Genre: Pop
- Length: 13:33
- Label: King Records
- Songwriter: 0 SOUL 7

Mamoru Miyano singles chronology
"...Kimi e"	"JS" (2009)	"Refrain" (2009)

"JS" (stylized "J☆S") is Japanese voice actor Mamoru Miyano's fourth single, released on July 29, 2009. It peaked at number 22 on the Oricon Singles Chart.

== Track listing ==
CD
No.	Title	Lyrics	Music	Length
1.	"J☆S (stands for "Just Smile")"	0 SOUL 7	0 SOUL 7	4:36
2.	"Happy Life! (ハッピーライフ! Happī Raifu!)"	Saori Matsubara	Kengo Minamida	3:42
3.	"Splash Blue"	ucio	Tsuge Toshimichi	5:15
