= Hari Tokeino =

Japanese manga artist

Hari Tokeino 時計野 はり
- Born: February 21, 1979 (age 47) Chiba Prefecture, Japan
- Area: Manga artist
- Notable works: Me & My Brothers
- Awards: Best Rookie – Santa no Iru Machi; Outstanding Debut – Me & My Brothers

Hari Tokeino (時計野 はり, Tokeino Hari; born February 21, 1979) is a Japanese shōjo manga artist. Her major works include Me & My Brothers, which ran in Hakusensha's LaLa magazine from 2004 to 2009 and was released in 11 volumes; and Gakuen Babysitters, which is ongoing in LaLa and has been released in 27 volumes.

== Works ==
Name	Year	Notes	Refs
Me & My Brothers	2004–09	Serialized in LaLa magazine Published under Hana to Yume Comics for 11 volumes.	
Hitai ni Mikazuki (The Crescent Moon on Forehead)	2005–06	Serialized in LaLa DX and LaLa Special	
Gyakuten Honey (Reversing Me & Honey)	2009	Serialized in LaLa DX and LaLa Special. Published under Hana to Yume Comics for 1 volume.	
Gakuen Babysitters (The Babysitters in the School)	2009–present	Serialized in LaLa. Published under Hana to Yume Comics for 27 volumes.	
