= Mitochondria (song) =

Single by Kenichi Suzumura
- Released: June 24, 2009
- Genre: J-pop
- Length: 9:15
- Label: Lantis
- Songwriter(s): Kenichi Suzumura

Kenichi Suzumura singles chronology
"Atarashii Neiro" (2009)	"Mitochondria" (2009)

"Mitochondria" is Kenichi Suzumura's third single, released on February 4, 2009. It came with a disc with the PV of the title track "Mitochondria", and peaked at #20 on the Oricon charts.

== Track listing ==
All lyrics are written by Kenichi Suzumura

CD
No.	Title	Length
1.	"Mitochondria (ミトコンドリア Mitokondoria)"	4:18
2.	"Sorya Sou Desu (そりゃそうです)"	4:57
