= School Babysitters =

Japanese manga and anime series

- Cover of School Babysitters volume 1 by Hakusensha

学園ベビーシッターズ (Gakuen Bebīshittāzu)
- Genre: Comedy, Slice of life
- Manga
- Written by: Hari Tokeino
- Published by: Hakusensha
- English publisher: NA: Comikey
- Magazine: LaLa
- Original run: September 24, 2009 – present
- Volumes: 28
- Anime television series
- Directed by: Shūsei Morishita
- Written by: Yuuko Kakihara
- Music by: Ruka Kawada
- Studio: Brain's Base
- Licensed by: NA: Crunchyroll; SA/SEA: Muse Communication
- Original network: Tokyo MX, Sun TV, BS11
- Original run: January 7, 2018 – March 25, 2018
- Episodes: 12 + 1 OVA

School Babysitters (Japanese: 学園ベビーシッターズ, Hepburn: Gakuen Bebīshittāzu) is a Japanese manga series written and illustrated by Hari Tokeino. It has been serialized in Hakusensha's shōjo manga magazine LaLa since September 2009, and has been collected in twenty-eight tankōbon volumes. A 12-episode anime television series adaptation by Brain's Base aired between January 7 and March 25, 2018. An OVA episode was announced in June 2018 and was bundled with the seventh DVD and Blu-Ray releases of the show.

== Plot ==
After the sudden death of their parents on a plane crash, two young brothers named Ryūichi Kashima (a freshman in high school) and his younger brother Kotarō (a preschooler) are left orphaned and having no place to call home. The chairwoman of the prestigious Morinomiya Academy offers to take the boys into her care, giving them a new house and free tuition, on the condition that Ryuichi helps out with the school's daycare center while also attending normal classes during school hours.

== Characters ==
=== Students ===
Ryūichi Kashima (鹿島 竜一, Kashima Ryūichi)
Voiced by: Kōtarō Nishiyama
He and his brother Kotaro lost their parents in an airplane accident, leaving them orphaned. They are taken in by Morinomiya in exchange for him helping with the school's babysitter club. Ryūichi is a kind-hearted and friendly boy who easily befriends people around him. He loves his little brother Kotaro and would do anything for him, trying his best to support him. He takes a liking to the babysitting activities, and all the infants that are drawn to him. Due to his kind-hearted personality, he is fairly popular with the girls at his school.
Hayato Kamitani (狼谷 隼, Kamitani Hayato)
Voiced by: Yūichirō Umehara
A boy in Morinomiya Academy, the son of Shizuka Kamitani and Taizō Hebihara, a science teacher in the school, and Taka's older brother. He becomes friends with Ryuichi and often hangs with him as one of his closest friends. He is mostly expressionless, quiet, and rarely says more than strictly needed. Although he often smacks Taka in order to have him behave (which becomes a recurring running gag), in reality Hayato loves and cares deeply for his brother, although he never openly states it toward him. He eventually joins the babysitting club as an official member, doing activities in there and in the baseball club.
Maria Inomata (猪又 まりあ, Inomata Maria)
Voiced by: Satomi Akesaka
A student in Morinomiya Academy's Special Class. She is a very studious girl but is socially awkward. Although she can be blunt and sometimes offensive, she is not a bad person at heart; rather, she finds it difficult to interact with people believing studying hard is all she excels at, and can become easily saddened, which shows that she can be sensitive. She develops a crush on Ryūichi to which he is oblivious, and recurrently interacts with the babysitting club and its children. The kids like her, but her stern demeanor can scare them at times.
Tomoya Yagi (山羊 朋也, Yagi Tomoya)
Voiced by: Toshiyuki Someya
A second-year student in the Morinomiya Academy Advanced Class. He is a handsome and kind-hearted boy who is very popular with the girls. He has a passion for cute children.
Chūkichi Nezu (根津 中吉, Nezu Chūkichi)
Voiced by: Motohiro Ōta
A schoolmate of Ryūichi and an old friend of Tomoya Yagi with shaggy black hair hanging over his eyes. His sloppy appearance belies his dedication as a student and hard worker, as well as his caring personality. He has several younger brothers and sisters, and although normally not allowed, he has gotten permission to work a part-time job to support his family.
Yuki Ushimaru (牛丸 雪, Ushimaru Yuki)
Voiced by: Kaede Hondo
A kind but painfully shy young girl and one of Ryūichi's classmates. She has developed a crush on him, but cannot bring herself to confess her feelings to him. Although initially a love rival with Maria Inomata, she gradually begins to consider her as her best friend.
Hiroyuki Inui (犬井 博幸, Inui Hiroyuki)
Voiced by: Yoshimasa Hosoya
A somewhat pushy high school boy who seeks to win the heart of Yukari Sawatori, despite the fact that she is happily married. Later on he develops a crush on Ryūichi when he mistakes him for a girl while the latter is wearing a wig. In his initial appearance he is shown to dislike children, but he acquires somewhat of a soft spot for them as time passes. At one point Usaida bribes him to watch over Kotaro while the toddler embarks on his first errand, and he keeps his anonymity by wearing a bag over his head.

=== Children ===
Kotarō Kashima (鹿島 虎太郎, Kashima Kotarō)
Voiced by: Nozomi Furuki
Ryuichi's younger brother. Kotaro is a toddler who loves his older brother and sticks with him. He is taken care of in the babysitter club where he gets along with the other kids his age. He is overall the most quiet of the infants, and is often expressionless in dangerous or even comical situations.
Taka Kamitani (狼谷 鷹, Kamitani Taka)
Voiced by: Yūko Sanpei
The younger Kamitani brother and one of the children in the daycare. Boisterous and stubborn, his attitude often puts him at odds with his older brother and occasionally other children. Although he may never admit it himself, he deeply cares for his older brother and aspires to be like him.
Takuma Mamizuka (狸塚 拓馬, Mamizuka Takuma)
Voiced by: Ayaka Saitō
One of the Mamizuka twins. Takuma is a very cheerful and outgoing toddler and is rarely seen without a smile on his face.
Kazuma Mamizuka (狸塚 数馬, Mamizuka Kazuma)
Voiced by: Atsumi Tanezaki
The second of the Mamizuka twins. Unlike his brother, he is very shy and prone to tears at the best of times. He is very close to Takuma and is rarely seen without him. Unassertive, he often copies or finishes Takuma's sentences.
Kirin Kumatsuka (熊塚 奇凛, Kumatsuka Kirin)
Voiced by: Konomi Kohara
The oldest toddler in the daycare. Smarter than her peers, she speaks relatively eloquently and politely, although she is not above getting into shenanigans herself. She is rarely seen without her favorite giraffe plushie.
Midori Sawatari (猿渡 美鳥, Sawatari Midori)
Voiced by: Kaede Hondo
The youngest child in the daycare. She is often carried on the back of one of the babysitters, usually Usaida.
Tsugumi (つぐみ)
Hayato and Taka's cousin. He arrived at the babysitting club after his mother got sick and became bedridden.

=== Parents/guardians ===
Yōko Morinomiya (森ノ宮 羊子, Morinomiya Yōko)
Voiced by: Tomoko Miyadera
The Chairwoman of Morinomiya Academy who lost her son and daughter-in-law in the same accident that killed the Kashima siblings' parents. Witnessing them during the funeral, she decides to take them both under her care under the condition that Ryuichi helps with the babysitter club, providing him with a house and school. Although she tends to be strict and work driven, she reveals a softer side to herself in time, constantly monitoring the siblings and caring for them in her own way. Her most striking feature is her abundant hair, which Kotaro claims is "shaggy" (もじゃもじゃ mojamoja), and calls her that as a nickname.
Keigo Saikawa (犀川 恵吾, Saikawa Keigo)
Voiced by: Daisuke Ono
Youko's butler and attendant. He watches over the siblings and treats to their needs. Totally unfazeable, he reacts with dry humor and tasteless jokes to any peculiarities he chances upon. Usually when Ryuuichi is busy with exams, Saikawa takes his place at the babysitter club to help take care of the children. He also becomes friends with Usaida.
Yoshihito Usaida (兎田 義仁, Usaida Yoshihito)
Voiced by: Tomoaki Maeno
A caretaker in the babysitter club. He is most of the time seen sleeping on the job and is shown to have a rather demotivated behavior, claiming this is because the chairman is stingy. Although he does not seem to work more than what is strictly required, he does seem to care for the kids and Ryuichi. In the manga, it is revealed that he wanted to be a teacher. In his backstory, he became the way he is, being disappointed on his father's choice of career path after he was laid off. But with Youko's son telling him to follow his heart, he became who he is now.
Yayoi Kumatsuka (熊塚 ヤヨイ, Kumatsuka Yayoi)
Voiced by: Atsumi Tanezaki
Kirin's mother is a cold-looking and soft-spoken but caring woman teaching Drama at Morinomiya Academy.
Satoru Kumatsuka (くまつか さとる, Kumatsuka Satoru)
Voiced by: Taishi Murata
A freelance photographer, Kirin's father, and Yayoi's husband. He is very protective of his daughter Kirin, forbidding her from kissing or even getting close to any of the boys at the daycare, especially Kotaro. The two are very close, even though they are both toddlers. Satoru also becomes extremely jealous whenever his wife Yayoi speaks to someone of the opposite sex. He is a very bubbly person whenever his daughter is around and is always seen with a digital camera in his hand to take pictures.
Yukari Sawatari (沢渡 ゆかり, Sawatari Yukari)
Voiced by: Yuna Kamakura
Midori's mother, a school secretary at Morinomiya Academy, is a gentle beauty who is married to a loving but often-absent archeologist.
Yutaka Sawatari (猿渡 豊, Sawatari Yutaka)
Voiced by: Kento Fujinuma
Midori's father and Yukari's husband. His job as an archaeologist often keeps him away from home on expeditions; his face is rarely shown and the lower part of his face is usually covered up with a huge beard (in the manga, his entire face is visible without his beard). He has a deep, booming voice in the anime series that makes him sound like someone much older than he actually is.
Umi Mamizuka (狸塚 うみ, Mamizuka Umi)
Voiced by: Ayaka Saitō
Kazuma and Takuma's mother. She is a P.E. teacher at Morinomiya Academy. She shares a cheerful personality with her son Takuma and often comforts her more timid son Kazuma, as well as her equally timid husband.
Kousuke Mamizuka (狸塚 恭介, Mamizuka Kousuke)
Voiced by: Satoshi Hino
Kazuma and Takuma's father. He's also a famous actor and is very popular with his fans. However, his fame has come at the cost of not being able to see his sons as often as he would like, resulting in Kazuma and Takuma's estrangement from him. With Ryūichi's encouragement, however, he eventually overcomes that barrier. He is a crybaby and contrary to his actor persona, he is very shy and emotional, but also kind. He commonly appears in sketchy disguises to avoid being recognized as a celebrity.
Shizuka Kamitani (狼谷 しずか, Kamitani Shizuka)
Voiced by: Yūko Sanpei
Hayato and Taka's mother and Taizo's ex-wife; she has a laid-back and easygoing personality. She can be stern at times but she does love her children. She works as a science teacher at Morinomiya Academy. She has a large amount of patience when dealing with her talkative and misbehaving son, Taka, sometimes gazing at him as a loving mother would, but becomes assertive and angry when she is rubbed the wrong way especially by her teenager son, Hayato, or ex-husband, Taizou. She has a tendency of hitting Hayato on the head when he does something foolish or disagreeable. Like Hayato, she extends this treatment to Usaida at times when he's slacking off on the job.
Taizou Hebihara (へびはら たいぞう, Hebihara Taizō)
Hayato and Taka's divorced father and Shizuka's ex-husband. Just like Hayato, he is usually expressionless but he has a more frightening appearance than his oldest son. He is very strict and has zero tolerance when comes to his students, often marking them absent even if they are only a few minutes late for school. He forces them to do chores under harsh deadlines, even during their free time, if they are unable to reply. He works as a chemistry teacher at Morinomiya Academy.

== Media ==
=== Manga ===
The manga has been serialized in Hakusensha's LaLa magazine since September 24, 2009, and as of October 2026, 28 volumes have been released in Japan. The series has also been released in French by Glénat Editions, in Chinese by Tong Li Publishing, and in English by Comikey.

==== Volume list ====
| No. | Release date | ISBN |
|---|---|---|
| 01 | April 30, 2010 | 9784592191711 |
| 02 | November 5, 2010 | 9784592191728 |
| 03 | April 5, 2011 | 9784592191735 |
| 04 | September 5, 2011 | 9784592191742 |
| 05 | March 5, 2012 | 9784592191759 |
| 06 | August 3, 2012 | 9784592191766 |
| 07 | March 5, 2013 | 9784592191773 |
| 08 | August 5, 2013 | 9784592191780 |
| 09 | April 4, 2014 | 9784592191797 |
| 10 | October 3, 2014 | 9784592195702 |
| 11 | April 3, 2015 | 9784592195719 |
| 12 | November 5, 2015 | 9784592195726 |
| 13 | August 5, 2016 | 9784592195733 |
| 14 | April 5, 2017 | 9784592195740 |
| 15 | October 5, 2017 | 9784592195757 |
| 16 | January 4, 2018 | 9784592195764 |
| 17 | March 5, 2018 | 9784592195771 |
| 18 | December 5, 2018 | 9784592195788 |
| 19 | July 5, 2019 | 9784592195795 |
| 20 | April 3, 2020 | 9784592195801 |
| 21 | December 4, 2020 | 9784592220916 |
| 22 | October 5, 2021 | 9784592220923 |
| 23 | July 5, 2022 | 9784592220930 |
| 24 | May 2, 2023 | 9784592220947 |
| 25 | May 5, 2024 | 9784592220954 |
| 26 | December 5, 2024 | 9784592222118 |
| 27 | November 5, 2025 | 9784592222125 |
| 28 | October 5, 2026 | 9784592222132 |

=== Novel ===
The series's first novel, written by Saya Kōzuki, was published by Hakusensha on March 3, 2018.

| No. | Release date | ISBN |
|---|---|---|
| 01 | March 5, 2018 | 9784592197560 |
On a chilly spring day, Morinomiya Academy's Chairwoman receives an invitation from an old friend who is a proprietress of an onsen ryokan. Ryūichi, Kotarō, and their friends all go on a hot spring trip. The children enjoy the large baths and delicious meals with members of the Babysitters Club and their parents. However, there is a mysterious legend in the mountain village they're visiting.

=== Anime ===
A 12-episode anime television series adaptation by Brain's Base aired between January 7, 2018, to March 25, 2018, on Tokyo MX, Sun TV and BS11. First announced on March 21, 2017, the series is directed by Shūsei Morishita with scripts written by Yuuko Kakihara and music by Ruka Kawada. Crunchyroll streamed the series. An OVA episode was announced in June 2018 and was bundled with the 7th DVD and Blu-Ray release.

| No. | Title | Directed by | Original air date |
|---|---|---|---|
| 1 | "Episode 1" | Keiji Gotoh | January 7, 2018 |
Ryūichi and Kotarō are being cared for by the head of the Morinomiya Academy because their parents died in a plane crash and Ryūichi has to help out in the daycare center at the school instead. The kids like Kotarō are left there under the care of a full-time employee named Yoshihito Usaida. When Usaida's working hours are up, Ryūichi takes care of them until he finds it difficult and ignores Kotarō who is reading a book alone in the corner of the room.
| 2 | "Episode 2" | Akira Mano | January 14, 2018 |
Ryūichi is warned by a top class student named Maria Inomata because of the kids making a noise in the school corridor. but during school break, Inomata comes to the daycare room. On another day, Ryūichi decides to take all the kids in the daycare center on an excursion to the zoo with their parents and Usaida. Among these kids, only Taka Kamitani was in a bad mood after fighting with his older brother, Hayato.
| 3 | "Episode 3" | Kenji Takahashi | January 21, 2018 |
Valentine's Day makes school students excited. Yagi and Nezu from the top class are very popular among the girls. Due to fame, Yagi wants to join the daycare center. On another day, the kids and Usaida are walking around the school grounds during winter, but Takuma is caught by a suspicious man so Ryūichi and Hayato help Takuma, but the man is actually Takuma and Kazuma's father and a famous actor named Kousuke Mamizuka.
| 4 | "Episode 4" | Hiroshi Ishiodori | January 28, 2018 |
Ryūichi, who becomes a high school student, decides to go around the school, which is bustling with recruiting new students for club activities, with Usaida and the kids. Ryūichi also works hard to increase the number of members of the babysitter club, but it isn't well. On another day, while at the head of the Morinomiya Academy's house, Ryūichi has a fever, so Kotarō decides to make a special drink with the head of the Morinomiya Academy so that he can get well soon.
| 5 | "Episode 5" | Akira Mano | February 4, 2018 |
Hiroyuki Inui, a second year high school student suddenly comes to the daycare center to look for Midori. In addition, he says that Midori will be his future daughter because he likes Midori's mother, Yukari. On another day, Kirin wants to learn to be a witch, but Taka thinks the witch isn't real and the "ranger" hero is real so they both have a big fight. Kirin, who is told that there are no witches, wants to prove that witches are real and that she can fly to the sky on a broom.
| 6 | "Episode 6" | Hiroshi Ishiodori | February 11, 2018 |
Kotarō, who was playing in his house's garden on a day off, finds a boy trapped in the bushes of the house's fence and calls Ryūichi. Ryūichi knows that the trapped child is Nezu's younger brother, Kichi, and tries to help him, but he refuses and says that he doesn't want to live in poverty. On another day at school, Ryūichi's lunch box is left in the daycare center and Kotarō will deliver it to his brother's class alone. Kotarō's journey ia tough enough that a masked hero was watching Kotarō from behind.
| 7 | "Episode 7" | Kenji Takahashi | February 18, 2018 |
Kotarō and Kirin want to meet Inomata who hasn't come to the daycare center to play in a long time, but they both misunderstand that Inomata hates Ryūichi so they both try hard to convey Ryuichi's charms to Inomata. On another day, Kazuma has a fever until Kousuke Mamizuka takes Takuma alone to the daycare center. Takuma plays with Kotarō and his friends as usual, but in the afternoon, Takuma starts to feel lonely without Kazuma.
| 8 | "Episode 8" | Hiroshi Ishiodori | February 25, 2018 |
Ryūichi receives a love letter for the first time that leaves him daydreaming in both the daycare center and at home, but Kotarō thinks Ryūichi has a fever again until the next morning when he goes to school, Kotarō is separated from Ryūichi in search of a fever medicine. On another day, Ryūichi and Kotarō will go to the summer festival with Hayato and Taka. They enjoy the festival, but they suddenly realize that Taka's toy sword is missing.
| 9 | "Episode 9" | Akira Mano | March 4, 2018 |
All the kids in the daycare center enjoyed the beach. Inomata joins them to the beach. This should be a lot of fun, unfortunately, Kotarō looks scared of the ocean. Ryūichi tries to make Kotarō less afraid by playing in the sand on the beach, so he decides to take a quick swim with Hayato while Kotarō is taking a nap. On another day, Taka comes to the daycare center crying after being ignored by Hayato because Hayato's baseball with signature was scribbled by Taka so Hayato ignores Taka. Taka's mother asks Ryūichi to talk to Hayato about Taka's problems.
| 10 | "Episode 10" | Hiroshi Ishiodori | March 11, 2018 |
The school festival has start. The daycare center also participates the festival by creating a cafe. The kids wear the vegetable costumes and their father is coming. Kirin's mother has a request for Ryūichi, Hayato and Usaida to wear a wig and behave like a girl because Kirin's father is coming to the daycare center. On another day, Taka and Hayato's mother invites Ryūichi and the kids to see the process of hatching chicks in the incubator of the school's science room, but they sees nothing and are dissatisfied, but only Kotarō who is still watching the chicken eggs enthusiastically.
| 11 | "Episode 11" | Kenji Takahashi | March 18, 2018 |
Usaida has a fever and can't come to the daycare center, so the head of Morinomiya Academy's assistant, Keigo Saikawa, is assigned to replace Usaida, but Midori runs into trouble until Saikawa calls Usaida. On another day, Ryūichi's classmate, Yuki Ushimaru, comes to the daycare center for the first time after being invited by Inomata, but she is not good at taking care of the kids. To overcome Yuki Ushimaru's weakness, Usaida takes the children for a walk around the school.
| 12 | "Episode 12" | Keiji Gotoh | March 25, 2018 |
Ryūichi decides to go with his classmates on a Sunday without Kotarō. Keigo Saikawa is assigned of keeping Kotarō at home while Ryūichi is out. While playing ball, Kotarō suddenly finds the head of the Morinomiya Academy's library. As Christmas approaches, the kids can't wait for presents from Santa Claus and Ryūichi also wants to make Kotarō happy by disguised as Santa Claus as Ryūichi and Kotarō's late father did at Christmas.
| OVA | "Special Episode" | - | September 26, 2018 |
Ryūichi has decided to take a break from the babysitter club to study for the test. To imitate Ryūichi, who works hard at studying, Kotarō and the kids decide to practice writing. Ryūichi would like to thank Saikawa for helping him during the test period. Ryūichi casually tries to find out what Saikawa likes. On another day, each character play drama called "Snow White".
