= Intention (Kenichi Suzumura song) =

"INTENTION"

Single by Kenichi Suzumura
- Released: October 8, 2008
- Genre: J-pop
- Length: 13:49
- Label: Lantis
- Songwriter(s): Kenichi Suzumura

Kenichi Suzumura singles chronology
| "INTENTION" (2008) | "Atarashii Neiro" (2009) |

Music video
- "INTENTION" on YouTube

"INTENTION" was Kenichi Suzumura's debut single, released in his album, Becoming.

== Release ==
It was released on October 8, 2008.

== Chart performance ==
It peaked at #14 on the Oricon charts.

== Track listing ==
All lyrics are written by Kenichi Suzumura

CD
| No. | Title | Length |
|---|---|---|
| 1. | "INTENTION" | 4:58 |
| 2. | "Persona" | 4:03 |
| 3. | "Simple na Mirai (シンプルな未来 A Simple Life)" | 4:48 |
