= Refrain (Mamoru Miyano song) =

Single by Mamoru Miyano

from the album Wonder
- A-side: "Refrain"
- B-side: "Träumerei"
- Released: October 21, 2009
- Genre: J-pop
- Length: 12:54
- Label: King Records
- Songwriters: Mamoru Miyano, Jin Nakamura

Mamoru Miyano singles chronology
"JS" (2009)	"Refrain" (2009)	"Hikari, Hikaru" (2010)

"Refrain" (stylized as "REFRAIN") is a song by Mamoru Miyano, released as his fifth single. The single also included "Ao no Tsubasa", the opening theme song to the game Uta no Prince-sama. The song was released on October 21, 2009.

== Reception ==
The single ranked #24 on the Oricon Weekly Singles Chart.

== Track listing ==
CD
No.	Title	Lyrics	Music	Arrangement	Length
1.	"Refrain"	Mamoru Miyano	Jin Nakamura		4:36
2.	"Träumerei" (トロイメライ)	Tomomi Narimoto	Tomomi Narimoto	Tomomi Narimoto	4:13
3.	"Ao no Tsubasa" (蒼ノ翼 lit. Blue Wings)	Noriyasu Agematsu (Elements Garden)	Junpei Fujita (Elements Garden)	Noriyasu Agematsu (Elements Garden)	4:05
Total length:					12:54

== Charts ==
Chart (2009)	Peak position
Oricon Weekly Singles Chart	24
