= Kōtetsu Sangokushi =

Japanese anime television series

- Promotional poster for the anime Kōtetsu Sangokushi

鋼鉄三国志
- Genre: Action, Supernatural, Historical
- Anime television series
- Directed by: Satoshi Saga; Tetsuya Endo (Chief Director)
- Produced by: Masanori Miyake
- Written by: Natsuko Takahashi
- Music by: Yuji Toriyama
- Studio: Picture Magic
- Original network: TV Tokyo
- Original run: April 5, 2007 – September 27, 2007
- Episodes: 25

Kōtetsu Sangokushi (鋼鉄三国志) is a 2007 Japanese anime loosely based on the 14th century Chinese historical fiction novel Romance of the Three Kingdoms. It was produced by NAS and Konami Digital Entertainment.

== Plot ==
The Imperial Seal has been passed down through the generations of guardians since ancient times. It confers great power unto those it chooses. This is the story of its guardians.

It is a time of war, when great armies clash in terrible battles and great heroes carve their names in history. It is also a time of death and destruction, when the people of the land live in constant fear of the sword. Onto this stage steps the reluctant Rikuson Hakugen (Lu Xun), whose family had been the guardians of the Imperial Seal up until it was stolen by Hakufu Sonsaku, the ruler of the kingdom of Go. At the behest of his mentor, Koumei Shoukatsuryou, (Zhuge Liang) Rikuson offers his services to Sonken with the intention of confirming the will of the Imperial Seal. However, assassins strike down Sonsaku and the Imperial Seal is lost. So begins, Rikuson's journey to recover the Imperial Seal and discover, with the help of his friends, his destiny.

== Characters ==
Anime names followed by (Romance of the Three Kingdoms) played by Japanese voice actors.

- Ekitoku Chouhi (Zhang Fei): Masaya Onosaka
- Chouryou Bun'en (Zhang Liao): Kappei Yamaguchi
- Choujou Kofu (Zhang Zhao): Tadashi Miyazawa
- Shiryuu Chou'un (Zhao Yun): Noriaki Sugiyama
- Kannei Kouha (Gan Ning): Junichi Suwabe
- Unchou Kan'u (Guan Yu): Tōru Ōkawa
- Kougai Koufuku (Huang Gai): Tōru Ōkawa
- Genyou Kouso (Huang Zu): Ryōtarō Okiayu
- Kyocho Chuukou (Xu Zhu)
- Hakugen Rikuson (Lu Xun): Mamoru Miyano
- Shikei Roshoku (Lu Su): Kenji Nojima
- Shimei Ryoumou (Lu Meng): Akira Ishida
- Ryousou Kouketsu (Ling Cao): Kazuhiko Inoue
- Ryoutou Kouseki (Ling Tong): Mitsuki Saiga
- Gentoku Ryuubi (Liu Bei): Rina Satō
- Shiyu Shokatsukin (Zhuge Jin): Kōji Yusa
- Koumei Shokatsuryou (Zhuge Liang): Takehito Koyasu
- Youhei Shuutai (Zhou Tai)
- Koukin Shuuyu (Zhou Yu): Shin-ichiro Miki
- Chuubou Sonken (Sun Quan): Hitomi Nabatame
- Hakufu Sonsaku (Sun Ce): Yasunori Matsumoto
- Shikou Soujin (Cao Ren): Masami Iwasaki
- Moutoku Sousou (Cao Cao): Yuji Mitsuya
- Taishiji Shigi (Taishi Ci): Kentarō Itō

== Episodes ==
No.	Title	Original release date
1	"Koumei Who Stands in Opposition, the Freeing of Rikuson the Crimson at Koutou"; Transliteration: "Zaiya no Kōmei, Shinku no Riku Son o Kōtō ni Hanatsu" (Japanese: 在野の孔明、深紅の陸遜を江東に放つ)	April 5, 2007
2	"Rikuson at a Loss, His Discovery of Chuubou Sonken in Go's Capital"; Transliteration: "Samayoeru Riku Son, Go no To ni Son Ken o Miidasu" (Japanese: 彷徨える陸遜、呉の都に孫権を見出す)	April 12, 2007
3	"Assemble at Koutou's Lands, Young Patriots"; Transliteration: "Wakaki Shishi domo, Kōtō no Daichi ni Shūketsu su" (Japanese: 若き志士ども、江東の大地に集結す)	April 19, 2007
4	"The One-Eyed Hero Entrusts Ryoutou with the Principles of a Warrior"; Transliteration: "Sekigan no Yūsha, Senshi no Michi o Ryō Tō ni Takusu" (Japanese: 隻眼の勇者、戦士の道を凌統に託す)	April 26, 2007
5	"A Grieving Ryoutou Roars in Agony as he Hunts Down a Bitter Enemy"; Transliteration: "Nageki no Ryō Tō, Kyūteki o Motomete Hōkō su" (Japanese: 嘆きの凌統、仇敵を求めて咆哮す)	May 3, 2007
6	"In His Sorrow, Kannei of Bells, Shoots an Arrow into the Battlefield"; Transliteration: "Suzu no Kan Nei, Kanashiki Isshi o Senjō ni Iru" (Japanese: 鈴の甘寧、悲しき一矢を戦場に射る)	May 10, 2007
7	"A Bewildered Rikuson Sees the Light in a Reunion with His Teacher"; Transliteration: "Madoishi Riku Son, Shi to no Saikai ni Hikari o Miru" (Japanese: 惑いし陸遜、師との再会に光を見る)	May 17, 2007
8	"Koumei Shoukatsuryou Inspires Sonken of Go with His Idea"; Transliteration: "Shokatsuryō Kōmei, Ron o Motte Go no Son Ken o Ugokasu" (Japanese: 諸葛亮孔明、論を以て呉の孫権を動かす)	May 24, 2007
9	"The Young Warriors Assemble at Koutou's Hills and Rivers for Training"; Transliteration: "Wakamusha Tsudoite, Kōtō no Sanga ni Onore o Migaku" (Japanese: 若武者集いて、江東の山河に己を磨く)	May 31, 2007
10	"Sou Moutoku Pushes a Red Wall, Drawing Near Sun Go"; Transliteration: "Sō Mōtoku, Akaki Kabe o Karite Son Go e Semaru" (Japanese: 曹孟徳、赤き壁を駆りて孫呉へ迫る)	June 14, 2007
11	"Go's Six Steeds Cause the Dawn Over Choukou to Gleam Red"; Transliteration: "Go no Roku Shun, Yoake no Chōkō ni Akaku Kirameku" (Japanese: 呉の六駿、夜明けの長江に紅く煌く)	June 21, 2007
12	"Ingenuity and Cunning, the Sound of the Ominous Flute Reverberates Across the Lake Shore"; Transliteration: "Chiryaku to Oniryaku, Ayashiki Fue no Oto Kohan ni Kodama su" (Japanese: 知略と鬼略、妖しき笛の音湖畔に木霊す)	June 28, 2007
13	"The Handsome Youth Stands Upon the Battlefield to Guide Rikuson"; Transliteration: "Bi Shūrō, Sen'ya ni Tachite Riku Son o Michibiku" (Japanese: 美周郎、戦野に立ちて陸遜を導く)	July 5, 2007
14	"The Wail of Go Wavers in Repose Offered by the Six Steeds"; Transliteration: "Son Go no Dōkoku, Roku Shun Chinkon ni Yurameku" (Japanese: 孫呉の慟哭、六駿鎮魂に揺らめく)	July 12, 2007
15	"Gloomy Rikuson, Sonken Vows to Recover his Smile"; Transliteration: "Ureishi Riku Son, Son Ken no Bishō ni Saiki o Chikai su" (Japanese: 憂いし陸遜、孫権の微笑に再起を誓す)	July 19, 2007
16	"Kan'u's Roar Strikes Rikuson Which Forces Him to Hold Determination"; Transliteration: "Kan U no Hōkō, Riku Son o Uchie Kakugo o Semaru" (Japanese: 関羽の咆哮、陸遜を撃ちて覚悟を迫る)	July 26, 2007
17	"Reunion at the Thatched Hut, the Deep Connection Between Master and Disciple, Wedged Together in Yizhou"; Transliteration: "Sōan no Saikai, Shitei no Fuka En Ekishū ni Kōsa su" (Japanese: 草庵の再会、師弟の深縁益州に交叉す)	August 2, 2007
18	"The Sworn Brothers of Taoyuan See the Flower of Ties in the Fields and Mountains of Shu"; Transliteration: "Momozono no Gikyoudai, Shoku no San'ya nite Kizuna no Hana o Miru" (Japanese: 桃園の義兄弟、蜀の山野にて絆の花を見る)	August 9, 2007
19	"Courageous Taishiji Stands Tall on the Earth of the Central Plains"; Transliteration: "Mōki Taishi Ji, nakahara no daichi ni niou tatsu" (Japanese: 猛き太史慈、中原の大地に仁王立つ)	August 16, 2007
20	"Shimei Ryomou of Go Rises from Obscurity by Using His Young Wisdom"; Transliteration: "Goka no Amō, Wakaki Chi o Mochiite Sono Mi o Okosu" (Japanese: 呉下の阿蒙、若き智を用いてその身を起こす)	August 23, 2007
21	"Jiang Ling's Setting Sun Seizes a Warrior's Soul"; Transliteration: "Kōryō no Rakujitsu, Bujin no Tamashii o Shindatsu su" (Japanese: 江陵の落日、武人の魂を侵奪す)	August 30, 2007
22	"Ryuubi Goes Insane and Becomes a Frozen Shadow Wandering in Go"; Transliteration: "Ryū Bi Ranshin, Itetsuku Kage Tonarite Kōtō no Samayou" (Japanese: 劉備乱心、凍てつく陰となりて江東を彷徨う)	September 6, 2007
23	"Chuubou Sonken, in the Snowfield, Follows Rikuson to Escape from His Homeland"; Transliteration: "Son Chūbō no Setsugen, Riku Son ni Tsuite Kokoku o Dassu" (Japanese: 雪原の孫仲謀、陸遜に従いて故国を脱す)	September 13, 2007
24	"Ryuubi's Weeping Gives a New Light to the Field"; Transliteration: "Ryū Bi no Rakurui, Aratana Kōmyō o No ni Shimesu" (Japanese: 劉備の落涙、新たな光明を野に示す)	September 20, 2007
25	"Rikuson Hakugen Dances on the Go Plains Where Red Stars Are Falling"; Transliteration: "Riku Hakugen, Akaki Hoshi Otsu Gojōhen ni Mau" (Japanese: 陸伯言、紅き星落つ五丈原に舞う)	September 27, 2007

== Theme songs ==
Opening:

1. "Nostalgia" by Camino

Ending:

1. "Kuon" by Miyano Mamoru

Insert Songs:

1. "Koubou" by Miyano Mamoru (episode 25)
