= Kenichi Suzumura =

Japanese voice actor and singer (born 1974)

- 鈴村 健一
- Born: September 12, 1974 (age 52); Niigata Prefecture, Japan
- Other names: Suzu (スズ); Suzuken (スズケン)
- Occupations: Voice actor; narrator; singer
- Years active: 1994–present
- Agent: INTENTION
- Spouse: Maaya Sakamoto (m. 2011)
- Children: 1
- Relatives: Masaki Suzumura (brother)
- Musical career
- Genre: J-pop
- Instrument: Vocals
- Years active: 2008–present
- Label: Lantis

Kenichi Suzumura (鈴村 健一, Suzumura Ken'ichi; born September 12, 1974) is a Japanese voice actor, narrator, and singer who is affiliated with and a representative of INTENTION, a voice acting company he founded in March 2012. He voiced Morley in Macross 7, Hikaru Hitachiin in Ouran High School Host Club, Zack Fair in the Final Fantasy VII metaseries, Masato Hijirikawa in Uta no Prince-sama, Sandalphon in Granblue Fantasy, Kyoichi Kanzaki in BOYS BE, Shiki Tohno in Tsukihime, Mikiya Kokuto in The Garden of Sinners, Tsubaki Asahina in Brothers Conflict, Yuya Aso in Super Gals!, Atsushi Murasakibara in Kuroko's Basketball, Momotaro Mikoshiba in Free!, Shinn Asuka in Mobile Suit Gundam SEED Destiny & Mobile Suit Gundam SEED Freedom, Leo Stenbuck in Zone of the Enders: The 2nd Runner, Sōgo Okita in Gintama, Rogue Cheney in Fairy Tail, Lavi in D.Gray-man, Obanai Iguro in Demon Slayer: Kimetsu no Yaiba, Ryutaros in Kamen Rider Den-O and Rakushun in The Twelve Kingdoms. He is part of the group Nazo no Shin Unit STA☆MEN (謎の新ユニットＳＴＡ☆ＭＥＮ) with Junichi Suwabe, Daisuke Kishio, Hiroki Takahashi, Hiroyuki Yoshino, Makoto Yasumura, and Kohsuke Toriumi. His younger brother is stunt coordinator, stuntman and actor Masaki Suzumura.

== Career ==
Suzumura was born in Niigata Prefecture. Having grown up in a family with many job transfers, he has lived in Okayama in Okayama Prefecture and Moji-ku, Kitakyūshū in Fukuoka Prefecture, in addition to Niigata Prefecture. Later, from the age of 15 to 19, he lived in Toyonaka, Osaka Prefecture, where he entered and graduated from Senri Seiun High School after attending Daini Junior High School from the third year of junior high school. The reason why he decided to become a voice actor was because he initially wanted to be a chef and had even ordered an application form to go to a Japanese culinary school, but a friend of Suzumura's brought him a newspaper clipping that asked if he wanted to be a voice actor, so they went to an audition together and Suzumura passed.

After studying at Yoyogi Animation Academy and the Japan Narration Actor Institute, Suzumura made his debut in 1994 as Morley in the TV anime series Macross 7. Since then, he has been active in a variety of fields including animation, games, radio and music.

In 2008, he won the Best Personality award and the Synergy Award (for Kamen Rider Den-O) at the 2nd Seiyu Awards. On October 8 of the same year, he made his major label debut with Lantis.

On August 13, 2011, he reported on his official blog that he and fellow voice actress, actress and singer Maaya Sakamoto got married on August 8, 2011. In the same year, he won the second prize at the first Music Jacket Awards 2011 (for his album CHRONICLE to the future).

In 2012, Suzumura won the Best Musical Performance as part of ST☆RISH at the 6th Seiyu Awards. In April of the same year, he left Arts Vision, to which he had belonged for many years, and on May 1 of the following month, he reported that he had launched Intention Inc. with Atsushi Kuwahara, his manager from Arts Vision.

In 2016, he won the double award for Best Actor in Supporting Role and Personality Award at the 10th Seiyu Awards. In the same year, he won a special award at the sixth Music Jacket Awards 2016 (for his album Tsuki to Taiyou no Uta).

A national survey on the popularity of voice actors conducted in March 2010 revealed Suzumura and Mamoru Miyano as the most famous voice actors. In the following year, 2011, TBS Rank Ōkoku listed Suzumura as 3rd of the five most popular voice actors.

Suzumura's favorite motto is, "Life is what you make of it."

On December 27, 2021, Suzumura and Sakamoto announced that they were expecting their first child. On April 21, 2022, the couple announced the birth of their first child.

On May 16, 2024, it was announced that Suzumura would be taking a break due to his poor health, and that his agency would announce his return at a later date. On July 31, 2024, it was announced that he planned to gradually return to his career while taking his health into consideration.

== Filmography ==
=== Television animation ===
Year	Title	Role	Notes
1994	Macross 7	Morley	
1996	Mizuiro Jidai	Shibasaki-kun	
1997	Revolutionary Girl Utena	Schoolboy C	
1998	His and Her Circumstances	Cousin B	
1998	Nazca	Kyoji Miura/Bilka	
1998	Bakusō Kyōdai Let's & Go!! Max	Sakyou Majima	
1998	Orphen	Sentry C	
1998	Yoshimoto Muchikko Monogatari	Kuwabaramukade	
1999	Kaikan Phrase	Atsuro Kiryuu	
2000	Gear Fighter Dendoh	Subaru	
2000	Boys Be...	Kyoichi Kanzaki	
2000	Pokémon	Chiko, Hisashi, Saiga	
2000	Descendants of Darkness	Yamashita	
2001	X	Kamui Shirou, Researcher 2	
2001	Offside	Jean	
2001	Cosmic Baton Girl Cometto-san	Domiken-san	
2001	Captain Tsubasa: Road to 2002	Genzō Wakabayashi	
2001	Kokoro Library	Aigame/Kameya	
2001	Super GALS! Kotobuki Ran	Yuya Asou	
2001	Dennō Bōkenki Webdiver	Pegashion, Phoenikuon	
2001	Babel II - Beyond Infinity	Koichi Kamiya/Babel II	
2001	Beyblade	Bartholome, Fuji, Steve	
2001	Parappa the Rapper	Matt	
2001	Hikaru no Go	Shinichirou Isumi	
2002	Magical Shopping Arcade Abenobashi	New Bank Teller	
2002	The Twelve Kingdoms	Rakushun	
2002	Spiral	Ayumu Narumi	
2002	Gravion	Eiji Shigure	
2002	Digimon Frontier	Kouichi Kimura	
2002	Dragon Drive	Hikaru Himuro	
2002	Hungry Heart - Wild Striker	Yuuya Kiba	
2002	UFO Ultramaiden Valkyrie	Kazuto Tokino	
2003	UFO Ultramaiden Valkyrie 2: December Nocturne	Kazuto Tokino	
2003	Avenger	Teo	
2003	Ashita no Nadja	Leonardo Cardinale	
2003	Astro Boy: Mighty Atom	Yuko Nishino	
2003	Please Twins!	Kousei Shimazaki	
2003	Gad Guard	Hajiki Sanada	
2003	Kaleido Star	Dio	
2003	Cromartie High School	Masao Tanaka	
2003	Tsukihime	Shiki Tohno	
2003	Saint Beast	Fūga no Maya	
2003	Divergence Eve	Co-pilot, Lieutenant Azevedo, Nodera, Operator, Researcher	
2003	Tantei Gakuen Q	innai Takuma, Policeman	
2003	Nanaka 6/17	Kenji Nagihara	
2003	Popotan	Adult Daichi	
2003	Pokemon Advance	Kachinuki Ryouhei	
2003	Massugu ni Ikou	Ijuuin Takeshi	
2004	Gakuen Alice	Reo Mouri	
2004	Mobile Suit Gundam Seed Destiny	Shinn Asuka	
2004	The Gokusen	Shin Sawada	
2004	Gravion Zwei	Eiji Shigure	
2004	The Cosmopolitan Prayers	Black Prince: 'A' Side	
2005	Ichigo 100%	Junpei Manaka	
2005	Trinity Blood	Dietrich von Lohengrin	
2005	Noein - to your other self	Atori	
2005	Peach Girl	Kairi Okayasu	
2006	Witchblade	Hiroki Segawa	
2006	Ouran High School Host Club	Hikaru Hitachiin	
2006	Gakuen Heaven	Shunsuke Taki	
2006	Gin-iro no Olynssis	Consul	
2006	Gintama	Okita Sougo	
2006	Shonen Onmyouji	Suzaku	
2006	D.Gray-man	Lavi	
2006	Tokko	Ranmaru Shindou	
2006	Looking Up At The Half-Moon	Yuichi Ezaki	
2006-2008	Sora no Iro, Mizu no Iro	Saisho Hajime	H-Anime series
2007	Hero Tales	Taitō	
2007	Saint Beast: Kouin Jojishi Tenshi Tan	Fuge no Maya	
2007	Zombie-Loan	Chika Akatsuki	
2007	Bokurano	Hatagai	
2007	Major	Hayato Yaginuma	
2007	Wangan Midnight	Keiichiro Aizawa	
2008	Naruto Shippūden	Choumei, Utakata	
2008	Amatsuki	Ginshu	
2008	Sgt. Frog	TV	
2008	Soul Eater	Kilik Lunge	
2008	Birdy the Mighty: Decode	Satyajit Shyamalan	
2008	Bus Gamer	Toki Mishiba	
2009	Slap Up Party: Arad Senki	Kapenshisu	
2009	Umineko no Naku Koro ni	George Ushiromiya	
2009	The Beast Player Erin	Ial	
2009	Fresh Pretty Cure!	Soular	
2010	Iron Man	Sho	
2010	Maid Sama!	Tora Igarashi	
2010	Star Driver	Tsukihiko Bou/Stick Star	
2010	Battle Spirits: Brave	The Darkness Zazie	
2011	A Dark Rabbit Has Seven Lives	Hasga Entolio	
2011	Uta no Prince-sama Maji LOVE 1000%	Masato Hijirikawa, ST★RISH	Season 1
2011	Heaven's Memo Pad	Renji Hirasaka	
2011	Tamayura - Hitotose	Sakaya	
2011	Maji de Watashi ni Koi Shinasai!!	Takuya Morooka	
2011	Dream Eater Merry	Ryōta Iijima	
2011	You're Being Summoned, Azazel	Himoi	
2012	Aquarion Evol	Cayenne Suzushiro	
2012	Accel World	Ash Roller	
2012	Ixion Saga DT	Gustave	
2012	Kuroko's Basketball	Atsushi Murasakibara	
2012	Koi to Senkyo to Chocolate	Yakumo Mōri	
2012	Code:Breaker	Toki/Code:04	
2012	Sakamichi no Apollon	Muroi	
2012	Shirokuma Café	Businessman	
2012	Zetman	Hayami	
2012	Daily Lives of High School Boys	Yoshitake	
2012	Muv-Luv Alternative: Total Eclipse	Lord	
2012	Natsuiro Kiseki	Kasai-sensei	
2012	Fairy Tail	Rogue Cheney	
2012	Magi: The Labyrinth of Magic	Kōbun Ka	
2013	Magi: The Kingdom of Magic	Kōbun Ka	
2013	Uta no Prince-sama Maji LOVE 2000%	Masato Hijirikawa, ST★RISH	Season 2
2013	Star Blazers 2199	Daisuke Shima	
2013	Ore no Kanojo to Osananajimi ga Shuraba Sugiru	Takuya Sakagami	
2013	Gaist Crusher	Cypher	
2013	Kyousogiga	Myōe	
2013	Coppelion	Haruto Kurosawa	
2013	Senyu	Foifoi	
2013	Bakumatsu Gijinden Roman	Magoichi Suzuki	
2013	Brothers Conflict	Tsubaki Asahina	
2014	Naruto: Shippuden	Sukea (Kakashi Hatake)	Episode 469
2014	Wake Up, Girls!	Tasuku Hayasaka	
2014	Gundam Build Fighters Try	Wilfrid Kijima	
2014	Captain Earth	Amara	
2014	Soul Eater Not!	Kilik Lunge	
2014	Laughing Under the Clouds	Abe no Hirari	
2014	Free! Eternal Summer	Momotarou Mikoshiba	
2014	Magical Warfare	Kazumi Ida	
2014	Pokemon XY: Mega Evolution	Daigo Tsuwabuki/Steven Stone	
2014	Fairy Tail	Rogue Cheney, Future Rogue Cheney	
2014-2015	I Can't Understand What My Husband Is Saying	Hajime Tsunashi	Seasons 1 and 2
2015	Uta no Prince-sama Maji LOVE Revolutions	Masato Hijirikawa, ST★RISH	Season 3
2015	Seraph of the End	Crowley Eusford	
2015	Seraph of the End: Battle in Nagoya	Crowley Eusford	
2015	Gintama°	Okita Sougo	
2015	Kuroko's Basketball	Atsushi Murasakibara	Season 3
2015	Rokka: Braves of the Six Flowers	Hans Humpty	
2015	Prison School	Shingo Wakamoto	
2015	Mr. Osomatsu	Iyami	
2015	Concrete Revolutio: Chōjin Gensō	Raito Shiba	
2015	Diamond No Ace	Matsuhara Nao	
2016	Schwarzesmarken	Theodor Eberbach	
2016	Ajin: Demi-Human	Sokabe	Eps. 9
2016	Mysterious Joker	Fake Joker	Ep. 32, season 3
2016	Uta no Prince-sama Maji LOVE Legend Star	Masato Hijirikawa, ST★RISH	Season 4
2016	Gakusen Toshi Asterisk	Jolbert Murray Johannes Heinrich van Riessfeld	Season 2
2016	First Love Monster	Jōji Takahashi	
2017	Kuroko's Basketball The Movie: Last Game	Atsushi Murasakibara	
2017	Re:Creators	Yūya Mirokuji	
2017	Infini-T Force	Takeshi Yoroi / Polymar	
2017	Konbini Kareshi	Towa Honda	
2017	The Ancient Magus' Bride	Adolf Stroud	
2017	Our love has always been 10 centimeters apart	Haruki Serizawa	
2017	Blood Blockade Battlefront and Beyond	Zamedle Lolow Zeaze Nazamsandriga	
2017	Gintama Porori-Hen	Okita Sougo	
2018	Gintama: Gin no Tamashi-hen	Okita Sougo	
2018	Legend of the Galactic Heroes	Yang Wenli	
2018	Nil Admirari no Tenbin: Teito Genwaku Kitan	Shizuru Migiwa	
2018	100 Sleeping Princes and the Kingdom of Dreams	Avi	
2018	Free! Dive to the Future	Momotarou Mikoshiba	
2018	Captain Tsubasa	Genzō Wakabayashi	
2018	Inazuma Eleven: Ares	Seiya Nishikage	
2018	SSSS.Gridman	Anti	
2019	Bungo Stray Dogs 3	Katai Tayama	
2019	Fire Force	Takehisa Hinawa	
2019	Demon Slayer: Kimetsu no Yaiba	Obanai Iguro	
2019	Fate/Grand Order - Absolute Demonic Front: Babylonia	Romani Archaman	
2020	Infinite Dendrogram	Figaro	
2021	Godzilla Singular Point	Takehiro Kai	
2021	Burning Kabaddi	Ren Takaya	
2021	Mars Red	Suwa	
2021	Backflip!!	Yōjirō Mutsu	
2021	Life Lessons with Uramichi Oniisan	Saito Uebu	
2021	Muteking the Dancing Hero	Owen	
2021	Restaurant to Another World 2	Delivery man	
2022	Trapped in a Dating Sim: The World of Otome Games Is Tough for Mobs	Julius Rapha Holfort	
2022	Uncle from Another World	Edger	
2022	Cardfight!! Vanguard will+Dress	Riku Kumatori	
2022	Blue Lock	Ryōsuke Kira	
2022	Pokémon Ultimate Journeys: The Series	Daigo Tsuwabuki/Steven Stone	
2023	By the Grace of the Gods	Pioro	Season 2
2023	Bleach: Thousand-Year Blood War	James	
2023	Edens Zero	Poseidon Shura	Season 2
2023	Dog Signal	Shinichirō Niwa	
2024	Brave Bang Bravern!	Bravern	
2024	The Elusive Samurai	Kusunoki Masashige	
2024	The Magical Girl and the Evil Lieutenant Used to Be Archenemies	Fomalhaut	
2025	The Red Ranger Becomes an Adventurer in Another World	Vidan	
2025	Tojima Wants to Be a Kamen Rider	Ichiyo Shimamura	

=== Original video animation ===
Year	Title	Role	Notes
2002-2004	Macross Zero	Shin Kudo	
2005	Final Fantasy VII: Advent Children	Zack Fair	
2005	Last Order Final Fantasy VII	Zack Fair	
2019	Hi Score Girl: Extra Stage	Sagat Takadanobaba	

=== Theatrical animation ===
Year	Title	Role	Notes
2007	The Garden of Sinners: Overlooking View	Kokutou Mikiya	
2007	The Garden of Sinners: A Study in Murder – Part 1	Kokutou Mikiya	
2008	The Garden of Sinners: Remaining Sense of Pain	Kokutou Mikiya	
2008	The Garden of Sinners: The Hollow Shrine	Kokutou Mikiya	
2008	The Garden of Sinners: Paradox Spiral	Kokutou Mikiya	
2008	The Garden of Sinners: Oblivion Recording	Kokutou Mikiya	
2009	The Garden of Sinners: A Study in Murder – Part 2	Kokutou Mikiya	
2013	The Garden of Sinners: Future Gospel	Kokutou Mikiya	
2014	SHORT PEACE: Ranko Tsukigime's Longest Day	Ren Kurenai	
2017	Lu over the Wall	Teruo	
2017	DC Super Heroes vs. Eagle Talon	Superman	
2018	Godzilla: The Planet Eater	Akira Sakaki	
2019	Mr. Osomatsu: The Movie	Iyami	
2019	Free! Road to the World - the Dream	Momotaro Mikoshiba	
2020	Demon Slayer: Kimetsu no Yaiba the Movie: Mugen Train	Obanai Iguro	
2020	Fate/Grand Order: Camelot - Wandering; Agaterám	Romani Archaman	
2021	Gintama: The Very Final	Sōgo Okita	
2021	Fate/Grand Order Final Singularity - Grand Temple of Time: Solomon	Romani Archaman	
2021	Bright: Samurai Soul	Ōkubo	
2022	Mr. Osomatsu: Hipipo-Zoku to Kagayaku Kajitsu	Iyami	
2022	Backflip!!	Yōjirō Mutsu	
2022	Uta no Prince-sama: Maji Love ST☆RISH Tours	Masato Hijirikawa	
2023	Gridman Universe	Knight	
2023	Komada: A Whisky Family	Yūsuke Saitō	
2024	Mobile Suit Gundam SEED Freedom	Shinn Asuka	
2025	Demon Slayer: Kimetsu no Yaiba – The Movie: Infinity Castle	Obanai Iguro	

=== Live-action film ===
Year	Title	Role	Notes
2017	Ajin: Demi-Human		Cameo appearance

=== Live-action television ===
Year	Title	Role	Notes
2019	Tokusatsu GaGaGa	Narrator and Emer Jason (voice)	

=== Video games ===
Year	Title	Role	Notes
1996	Wild Arms: Alter Code F	Rudy Roughnight	Japanese version only
2001	Klonoa 2: Lunatea's Veil	Steward of the Ghost Palace	
2001	Neon Genesis Evangelion: Ayanami Raising Project	Protagonist	Windows and Dreamcast versions only
2002	Gigantic Drive	Naoto Tsukioka	
2002	Silver Chaos	Might	Yaoi RPG PC Game
2002	Gakuen Heaven: Boy's Love Scramble	Taki Shunsuke	
2003	Final Fantasy X-2	Gippal	
2003	Anubis: Zone of the Enders	Leo Stenbuck	
2003	Arc the Lad: Twilight of the Spirits	Darc	
2005	Kingdom Hearts II	Demyx	
2005	Tales of Legendia	Senel Coolidge	
2006	Tales of the World: Radiant Mythology	Senel Coolidge	
2006	Tokimeki Memorial Girl's Side: 2nd Kiss	Hariya Kounoshin	
2007	Elsword	Elsword	
2007	Growlanser VI: Precarious World	Zeonsilt	
2007	Super Robot Wars Scramble Commander the 2nd	Shinn Asuka, Shin Kudo	
2008	Starry☆Sky~in Winter~	Amaha Tsubasa	
2008	Super Robot Wars Z	Shinn Asuka, Eiji Shigure	
2009	Wand of Fortune PS2/PSP	Alvaro Garay	
2009	Bloody Call	Wataru	
2009	R-Type Tactics II: Operation Bitter Chocolate	Claude Rhan	
2009	Castlevania Judgment	Simon Belmont	
2009	Kingdom Hearts 358/2 Days	Demyx	
2009	Crisis Core: Final Fantasy VII	Zack Fair	
2010	Kingdom Hearts Birth by Sleep	Zack Fair	
2010	Spider-Man: Shattered Dimensions	Ultimate Spider-Man and other male characters	
2010	Umineko: When They Cry	George Ushiromiya	
2010	Umineko: Golden Fantasia	George Ushiromiya	
2010	Another Century's Episode: R	Shinn Asuka, Shin Kudo	
2010	Uta no Prince-sama	Masato Hijirikawa	
2010	Uta no Prince-sama Amazing Aria	Masato Hijirikawa	
2011	Uta no Prince-sama Sweet Serenade	Masato Hijirikawa	
2011	Uta no Prince-sama Music	Masato Hijirikawa	
2011	Final Fantasy Type-0	Jack	
2011	Nora to Toki no Kōbō: Kiri no Mori no Majo	Ruttz Alenius	
2012	Brothers Conflict: Passion Pink	Tsubaki Asahina	
2012	Uta no Prince-sama Debut	Masato Hijirikawa	
2013	Uta no Prince-sama Music 2	Masato Hijirikawa	
2013	Uta no Prince-sama All Star	Masato Hijirikawa	
2013	Kingdom Hearts HD 1.5 Remix	Demyx	
2013	Persona 4 Arena Ultimax	Sho Minazuki	
2013	Naruto Shippuden: Ultimate Ninja Storm 3	Utakata	
2014	Granblue Fantasy	Sandalphon	
2014	XBlaze Code: Embryo	Ripper	
2015	Final Fantasy Type-0 HD	Jack	
2015	Fate/Grand Order	Tawara Touta, Romani Archaman/Solomon	
2016	Onmyōji	Shiromujō	
2017	Danganronpa V3: Killing Harmony	Korekiyo Shinguji	
2017	Uta no Prince-sama All Star After Secret	Masato Hijirikawa	
2017	Fire Emblem Heroes	Leif, Quan	
2017	Super Robot Wars V	Shinn Asuka, Daisuke Shima	
2017	Tales of the Rays	Senel Coolidge, Sogo Okita	
2017	Warriors All-Stars	Darius	
2017	Dissidia Final Fantasy: Opera Omnia	Zack Fair	
2018	World of Final Fantasy Maxima	Zack Fair	
2018	The Thousand Musketeers	89	
2018	Ni no Kuni II: Revenant Kingdom	President Musaka	
2018	Snack World: The Dungeon Crawl – Gold	Avatar (Male)	
2018	The King of Fighters All Star	Okita Sougo	
2019	Kingdom Hearts III	Demyx	
2019	Uta no Prince-sama Repeat	Masato Hijirikawa	
2019	Namu Amida Butsu! -UTENA-	Hōshō Nyorai	
2019	Saint Seiya Awakening	Leo Aiola	
2020	Final Fantasy VII Remake	Zack Fair	
2020	Tales of Crestoria	Senel Coolidge	
2020	Fairy Tail	Rogue Cheney	
2021	Balan Wonderworld	Balan	
2021	The Legend of Nayuta: Boundless Trails	Signa Alhazan	
2022	Crisis Core: Final Fantasy VII Reunion	Zack Fair	
2023	Final Fantasy VII: Ever Crisis	Zack Fair	
2023	Fire Emblem Engage	Leif	
2024	Final Fantasy VII Rebirth	Zack Fair	
2024	Reynatis	Yakumo Kokufu	
2025	Inazuma Eleven: Victory Road	Arata Shimozuru	

=== Drama CDs ===
Year	Title	Role	Notes
1998	Tokyo Junk 2	You Yoshikawa	
1999	D.N.Angel Wink Series	Keiji Saga	
2000	Kiraini Naranai dene	Taishi Kishima	
2002	Aka no Shinmon	Wataru Kurumiya	
2002	Munasawagi series	Hazuki Nishio	
2002	Amai Tsumi no Kakera	Tomoyuki Tachibana	
2002	Ourin Gakuen series 3: Sekushi Boizu de Sasayaide	Ryou Hourenge	
2002	Saint Beast	Fuga no Maya	
2002	Sakurazawa vs Hakuhou series 2: Houkengo no Nayameru Kankei	Kazuhiro Okamoto	
2002	Denkou Sekka Boys	Nanao Ogasagawa	
2002	Wagamama Prisoner	Makoto Ikusawa	
2002	Wagamama Prisoner/My Master is My Classmate section	Ryou Asakura	
2002	Yasashikute Toge ga Aru	Ryou Asakura	
2002	Close the Last Door	Nagai Atsushi	
2003	Into Your Heart through the Door	Nagai Atsushi	
2003	Closet de Ubaitai	Natsuki Yamaguchi	
2003	Bara no Sabaku	Kai Toujou	
2003	Mayonaka ni Oai Shimashou	Kon Kaidouji	
2003	Mix Mix Chocolate	Mera Osaka	
2003	Only the Ring Finger Knows	Fujii Wataru	
2003	Ouran High School Host Club	Hikaru Hitachiin, Kaoru Hitachiin	
2003	Renai Trap	Tsuji Shinobu	
2003	Aisaresugite Kodoku series 1: Aisaresugite Kodoku	Chihiro Oozawa	
2003	Saredo Futeki na Yatsura	Wataru Nakahara	
2003	Yurigaoka Gakuen series 2: Kimidake no Prince ni Naritai	Kureha Yanase	
2003-2007	Shiawase ni Dekiru series 1, 2 & 5	Tamotsu Kagami	
2004	Shiro Ari	Alice	
2004	Sekai no Subete ga Teki Datoshitemo	Chihiro Monma	
2004	Cherry Boy Sakuzen	Matsuoka Akira	
2004	Himitsu no Kateikyoushi	Takafumi Inoue	
2004	Eigoku Yoidan	Yuri Fordum	
2004	Aisaresugite Kodoku series 2: Itoshisugita Shifuku	Chihiro Oozawa	
2004	Parfait Tic!	Daiya Shinpo	
2004	Renai à la Carte!	Shogo Izumi	
2004	Milk Crown no Tameiki	Nozomi Yukishita	
2004	Yuiga Dokuson na Otoko	Kyouya Ikuura	
2004	Zombie Loan	Akatsuki Chika	
2005	Nessa no Ou	Yoshiya	
2005	Ambassador wa Yoru ni Sasayaku	Ikuo Mori	
2005	Fruits Basket HCD	Kakeru Manabe	
2005	Fusatsugi	Tokura Hijiri, Kidōmaru, Shiten Hōji	
2005-2010	Yuuwaku Recipe	Ueda	
2006	Balettstar	Endō Akira	
2006	Kimi to Boku	Tsukahara Kaname	
2006	Shōnen Onmyōji	Suzaku	
2006	Toriko ni Saseru Kisu wo Shiyou	Touya Sugisaki	
2007	Me & My Brothers	Tsuyoshi Miyashita	
2007	Special A	Kei Takishima	
2008	Bus Gamer	Mishiba Toki	
2008	Cafe Latte Rhapsody	Hajime Serizawa	
2008	Dolls	Shouta Mikoshiba	
2008	Genso Suikoden	Tir McDohl	
2008	Gin Tama	Sōgo Okita	
2008	Hana to Akuma	Klaus	
2008	Hanayoi Romanesque	Hōshō Sumire	
2008	Iro Otoko	Suou Ishikawa	
2008	Iro Otoko: Kyodai Hen	Suou Ishikawa	
2008	Tenki Yohou no Koibito	Amasawa Chitose	
2008-2009	Amatsuki	Ginshu	
2009	Shōnen Bride	Matsūra Shinobu	
2009	Hitorijime Theory	Tachibana	
2010	Akuma no Himitsu	Priest	
2012	Tonari no Kaibutsu-kun	Haru Yoshida	
2012	Endou-kun no Kansetsu Nikki	Kanzaki	
2013	Gundam SEED Destiny	Shinn Asuka	
2014	Gate	Minamiyama Shigeru	

=== Tokusatsu ===
Year	Title	Role	Notes
2007	Kamen Rider Den-O	Ryutaros/R Ryoutarou/Kamen Rider Den-O Gun Form/Climax Form (eps. 13 - 49), Gecko Imagin (ep. 40)	
2007	Kamen Rider Den-O: I'm Born!	Ryutaros/R Ryoutarou/Kamen Rider Den-O Gun Form, Gecko Imagin	
2008	Kamen Rider Den-O & Kiva: Climax Deka	Ryutaros/R Ryoutarou/Kamen Rider Den-O Gun Form/Climax Form	
2008	Kamen Rider Kiva: King of the Castle in the Demon World	Soccer Player (Actor)	
2008	Saraba Kamen Rider Den-O: Final Countdown	Ryutaros/Kamen Rider Den-O Gun Form/Climax Form	
2009	Kamen Rider Decade	Ryutaros/Kamen Rider Den-O Gun Form	Ep. 14-15
2009	Cho Kamen Rider Den-O & Decade Neo Generations: The Onigashima Warship	Ryutaros/Kamen Rider Den-O Gun Form/Cho Climax Form/R Lamon/Kamen Rider Ouja (Ryutaros)	
2009	Kamen Rider Decade: All Riders vs. Dai-Shocker	Kamen Rider X, Garagaranda	
2010	Kamen Rider × Kamen Rider × Kamen Rider The Movie: Cho-Den-O Trilogy	Ryutaros/Kamen Rider Den-O Gun Form/Climax Form	
2011	OOO, Den-O, All Riders: Let's Go Kamen Riders	Ryutaros, Garagaranda	
2012	Kamen Rider × Super Sentai: Super Hero Taisen	Ryutaros/Kamen Rider Den-O Gun Form, Kamen Rider W	
2012	Tokumei Sentai Go-Busters	Filmloid	Ep. 20
2014	Space Sheriff Shaider Next Generation	Fushigi Beast Pitapita	
2014	Heisei Rider vs. Shōwa Rider: Kamen Rider Taisen feat. Super Sentai	Kamen Rider Fourze, Kamen Rider Black RX, Yamaarashi-Roid	
2018	Kamen Rider Heisei Generations Forever	Ryutaros/Kamen Rider Den-O Gun Form	
2019	Kamen Rider Zi-O	Ryutaros/Kamen Rider Den-O Climax Form	Ep. 39-40
2020-2021	Mashin Sentai Kiramager	Mashin Fire	
2022	Kamen Rider Revice	Himself	Ep 30, on-screen appearance
2026	No.1 Sentai Gozyuger	Lex	Ep. 46-48

=== Commercials ===
Year	Title	Role	Notes
2018	The Way of the Househusband	Masa	

=== Dubbing ===
==== Live-action ====
Original year	Title	Role	Original actor	Notes
1949	The Third Man	Harry Lime	Orson Welles	New Era Movies edition
1960	Purple Noon	Philippe Greenleaf	Maurice Ronet	2016 Star Channel edition
2001	The Fast and the Furious	Johnny Tran	Rick Yune	2024 The Cinema edition
2014	If I Stay	Adam Wilde	Jamie Blackley	
2017	Genius	Maurice Solovine	Alexander Vlahos	
2022	Litvinenko	Alexander Litvinenko	David Tennant	
2012-2022	Staged	Tom	Ben Schwartz	
2026	Send Help	Bradley Preston	Dylan O'Brien	

==== Animation ====
Original year	Title	Role	Original actor	Notes
2002	Spirit: Stallion of the Cimarron	Little Creek	Daniel Studi	
2005-2008	Thomas and Friends	Mighty		
2018	Incredibles 2	Tony Rydinger	Michael Bird	
2022	DC League of Super-Pets	Keith	Thomas Middleditch	
2023	Migration	Googoo	David Mitchell	

== Music ==
In addition to performing many different character songs throughout his voice acting career, Suzumura is also a singer signed to the Lantis label. As a solo artist, he writes all his songs. In 2008, the debut year of his music career, Suzumura became one of the main hosts of the annual live music event Original Entertainment Paradise (OrePara), along with Lantis artists Showtaro Morikubo, Daisuke Ono, and Mitsuo Iwata.

In January, 2010, he gave his first solo concert tour in Osaka (January 10), Nagoya (January 11), Yokohama (January 23) and Tokyo (January 30). His second live tour, in 2011, was held in the same stops, Osaka (April 9), Nagoya (April 10), Tokyo (April 17) and Yokohama (May 1). Part of the proceeds from the concert were donated to help the victims of the Tōhoku earthquake and tsunami. As a result of a power shortage, the concert was simple to save power and Suzumura performed acoustic versions of songs.

In 2012, a poll on singing ability placed Suzumura as the third best voice actor singer, behind Kishō Taniyama (1st) and Mamoru Miyano (2nd).

=== Singles ===
Release date	Title	Notes	Chart position
October 8, 2008	"Intention"	Debut single	14
February 4, 2009	"Atarashii Neiro"		13
June 24, 2009	"Mitochondria"		20
January 27, 2010	"And Becoming"	Special release	23
July 7, 2010	"In My Space"		24
November 24, 2010	"Tsuki to Sutobu"		36
August 24, 2011	"Asunaro"	Ending theme song of the anime Heaven's Memo Pad	22
May 16, 2012	"Messenger"		24
October 17, 2012	"Shiroi Karasu"	Ending theme song of the anime Code:Breaker	16
October 30, 2013	"All Right"		20
May 13, 2015	"Tsuki to Taiyou no Uta"		33
May 18, 2016	"brand new"		23
August 31, 2016	"HIDE-AND-SEEK"	Ending theme song of the anime Handa-kun	27
March 6, 2024	"Ba-Bang to Suisan! Bang Bravern"	Opening theme song of the anime Brave Bang Bravern!	

=== Albums ===
Release date	Album	Notes	Chart position
October 7, 2009	Becoming		14
March 9, 2011	Chronicle to the Future		21
August 22, 2012	Go	Mini-album	20
May 15, 2014	Vessel		10
January 25, 2017	Naked Man	Mini-album	33
May 9, 2018	Going My Rail	10th Anniversary Best Album	12
November 24, 2021	Bright		31
May 24, 2023	Roots	Mini-album	24

=== CONNECT ===
Since 2009, Suzumura is part of the first Kiramune unit, CONNECT, with Mitsuo Iwata. They occasionally released singles and albums and participated the annual concert Kiramune Music Festival until 2014.

Release date	Title	Chart position	Notes
April 24, 2009	Connect	36	1st album
February 24, 2010	Fighting Spirits	34	1st single
September 29, 2010	Rasterizer	50	Mini-album
March 7, 2012	Jusensha Men	45	Mini-album
January 30, 2013	Connect no Tanoshii Ongaku	38	Mini-album
November 19, 2014	Ningen! Jetta Ningen	32	Mini-album

=== Other non-anime related releases ===
Release date	Title	Notes
October 22, 2003	"Shizumanai Taiyō"	Collaboration single with Takahiro Sakurai (as R-16)
March 26, 2004	"Separate Way"	Collaboration single with Takahiro Sakurai (as R-16)
December 17, 2005	Box Universe	Mini-album
February 29, 2012	Kizuna: Go-Busters!	"Single of Stamen", ending theme for Tokumei Sentai Go-Busters
