= Me & My Brothers =

Japanese manga series

- Me & My Brothers English volume 1 cover as published by Tokyopop, featuring (from clockwise left starting with the one with glasses) Takashi, Takeshi, Masashi, Sakura and Tsuyoshi

お兄ちゃんと一緒 (Onii-chan to Issho)
- Genre: Drama, Comedy
- Manga
- Written by: Hari Tokeino
- Published by: Hakusensha
- English publisher: NA: Tokyopop
- Magazine: LaLa
- Original run: 2004 – 2009
- Volumes: 11

Me & My Brothers (お兄ちゃんと一緒, Onii-chan to Issho) is a Japanese manga series written and illustrated by Hari Tokeino. The collected volumes are published by Hakusensha under the imprint Hana to Yume Comics. It is licensed for English language distribution by Tokyopop and for distribution in South Korea by Seoul Munhwa-Sa.

The series was serialized in shōjo manga magazine LaLa, and has been compiled into a total of eleven tankōbon, with the last volume published in July 2009.

The story concerns Sakura Miyashita, a fourteen-year-old girl who discovers that her late stepfather fathered four sons. These four brothers come to live with Sakura, and with their diverse personalities, help her deal with loneliness and insecurities. The manga follows Sakura's complicated relationship with and feelings towards her unusual family.

== Plot ==
Sakura, upon the spring of her first year in middle school. Her mother, Fumiko, and her stepfather died in an accident when she was three; the grandmother who raised her has just recently died. One day, however, Sakura comes home and is suddenly embraced by four men aged seventeen through twenty-five. They claim to be Sakura's half-brothers, and give her a letter from her grandmother that leaves her in their care.

It is soon revealed that Sakura holds no actual blood relation with the four, as their father didn't meet Fumiko until she was already pregnant with Sakura. Nevertheless, they manage to convince Sakura that their love for her as a sister is sincere. For the next few years, Sakura and her brothers live as family, experiencing the range of familial activities: sibling fights, school plays, discoveries of old family secrets, trips to festivals, and more.

Soon after graduating from middle school, Sakura discovers she is in love with her oldest brother, Masashi Miyashita.

== Characters ==
=== Main characters ===
Sakura Miyashita (宮下桜, Miyashita Sakura) Voiced by: Misato Fukuen (drama CD)

Sakura is an independent 14-year-old student. She was once an orphan but ever since she came into the hands of her brothers, she's living a happy and wonderful new life. Every day she becomes closer to her brothers and lightens the spirit of their home. After she graduates from middle school, she attends the same high school as Takeshi did. Later on in the series, she starts noticing that she's falling in love with her eldest brother Masashi.

Masashi Miyashita (宮下正, Miyashita Masashi) Voiced by: Takashi Kondō (drama CD)

The eldest brother of the family. He's a 25-year-old romance novelist who likes to dress in women's clothing. He claims his feminine side to be because of his job requires a woman and he tries to think of how they would feel in situations. He seems the most closest and cuddliest when it comes to his little sister. He is overprotective of her. He doesn't like cats. In volume 7, Sakura confesses her feelings to Masashi, which causes huge commotions and troubles in the family. Masashi's first love was Fumiko-san who is Sakura-chan's mother.

Takashi Miyashita (宮下隆, Miyashita Takashi) Voiced by: Hiroshi Kamiya (drama CD)

A 23-year-old teacher, a Japanese teacher at Sakura's middle school. He's the calmest in the family and likes cats. He doesn't really show his emotions, which makes him very mature indeed. He is also very popular as a teacher at Sakura's middle school.

Tsuyoshi Miyashita (宮下剛, Miyashita Tsuyoshi) Voiced by: Kenichi Suzumura (drama CD)

A 19-year-old who puts much care into his part-time jobs. Tsuyoshi is very irritable of his brothers yet he's more soft with Sakura since she's new and the youngest in the family (And because he loves her). He seems to blush almost every time he and Sakura talk to each other, probably because she's so cute. He is overprotective when it comes to her and is particularly vocal when expressing this attitude. Even though he claims it's unlike himself, his secret dream is to become an owner of a shop to make people happy. In volume 10, Tsuyoshi opens up his own store. After catching the action of Sakura confessing to Masashi, Tsuyoshi decides to be very, overly protective of Sakura from Masashi.

Takeshi Miyashita (宮下武, Miyashita Takeshi) Voiced by: Katsuyuki Konishi (drama CD)

A 17-year-old eleventh grader. He takes a special interest in gardening, which is his favorite hobby as well. Takeshi is the gentlest and quietest of the four brothers and cares quite well for Sakura. He graduates from high school and attends college just as Sakura graduates from middle school. Takeshi may love flowers, but his own little sister is his favorite flower. Even though he may seem tall for his age, he is the youngest of the four.

=== Other characters ===
Tomoko Tanaka (田中友子, Tanaka Tomoko)

A classmate and a good friend of Sakura. She finds Sakura's brothers very attractive and always perks up whenever she's in their presence. Her older brother attends Takeshi's high school. Tomoko accidentally says something about Sakura liking Masashi while visiting the Miyashita's house causing Masashi to hear it and Sakura confesses. She's known as the "love adviser".

Ichirou Suzuki (鈴木一郎, Suzuki Ichirou) Voiced by: Takuma Terashima (drama CD)

Another classmate and good friend of Sakura. He's a shy boy and has a crush on Sakura, but is too nervous to show it because he's frightened of her new guardians. He is particularly frightened by Masashi, who becomes the opposite of his usual optimistic self when he sees Suzuki gazing at Sakura, and Tsuyoshi, who is extremely vocal of his overprotective attitude toward Sakura. He eventually attends the same high school as Sakura. Suzuki later on decides to keep his feelings to himself and not let Sakura know about them.

Yosuke (洋介, Yousuke)

A cousin of Sakura's brothers, his family took Takeshi in when Sakura and her brothers' parents died. He is the same age as Takeshi and becomes an older brother figure to him. He leaves to train for soccer and is initially jealous that Sakura has taken his place in Takeshi's life. However, after Takeshi reveals he values Yosuke as a brother and hopes to be an older brother to Sakura like Yosuke was to him, Yosuke warms up to Sakura and begins to treat her like a sister. He calls Sakura "shorty".

Katagiri (片桐, Katagiri)

In the beginning, Katagiri has a tough life and is constantly bullied; he never talks and always gets into fights. The only person who could snap him out of his phase is Sakura, and eventually he calls in love with her. Katagiri confesses his love for Sakura, but she discovers he is moving away before she can respond. Before leaving though, she makes it clear that she just thinks of him as a friend. He later returns and attends the same high school as Sakura and forms a cooking club. After trying to get Sakura to be the love of his life, Sonomura confesses her love for him and he decides to move on.

Rin Morimoto (森本りん, Morimoto Rin)

A childhood friend of Tsuyoshi. He is half Japanese, as his father was Swiss and his mother Japanese. Introduced in Episode 13, Rin visits Tokyo to look at the college and to see Tsuyoshi, with whom he is in love but does not reciprocate his feelings. Like Masashi, Rin is incredibly effeminate and wears feminine attire, but unlike the eldest Miyashita brother, he is gay.

Taizo Fukasawa (深沢泰三, Fukasawa Taizo)

The 36-year-old owner of a cafe near the Miyashita household, he meets Sakura for the first time after she has lived with her brothers for about a year. Taizo has a habit of spouting Italian, which reflects his dream: to own a cafe in Italy. Sakura resembles the woman he loved who died while he was in Italy, so he takes to her immediately, much to her brothers' dismay. Eventually, it is revealed that Taizo is Sakura's biological father and that his love was Sakura's mother, Fumiko Otsuka. The Miyashitas confront Taizo about his relationship with Fumiko just as he is about to leave Japan for Italy to avoid seeing Sakura (and her painful resemblance to Fumiko); he affirms their suspicions and explains he has no intention of acting as Sakura's father and leaves Japan for Italy again. Sakura doesn't see Taizo again until after she graduates middle school. Masashi decides that maybe he, Sakura, and the other brothers should visit Italy to see Taizo for Sakura's sake, but he discovers that Taizo is back in Japan. Masashi meets Taizo in front of Fumiko's grave and convinces him to meet with Sakura again, as her father. He and Sakura are able to reconcile their relationship and Sakura recognizes him as a surrogate father figure.

Nana Kozuka (小塚鳴々, Kozuka Nana) Voiced by: Yuichi Nakamura (drama CD)

A member of the soccer club with Suzuki, he is in the 11th grade at Sakura's school. He has sister attachment issues with his sister, Nene, and doesn't feel comfortable unless he's holding her hand. He shows very little facial expression and is usually shown with a blank look, but he actually has a charming face and is very popular, as seen in Chapter 25 when he is shown with his pockets overflowing with Valentine's Day chocolate. He is also very good at imitating people's voices and constantly attempts to get Nene and Terada together. When Terada graduates, Nana succeeds him as the captain of the soccer team. In volume 10, a girl confesses her love for him, but he says that he's going out with "Shrimp", Sakura. Sakura takes it as a joke, but he doesn't. Yet she constantly confuses his feelings with Nene. It is hinted he may have a sister complex.

Nene Kozuka (小塚音々, Kozuka Nene) Voiced by: Sayaka Ōhara (drama CD)

An 11th grader at Sakura's school and Nana's twin sister, Nene is the manager of the soccer club. She has the same personality as Nana and is noted by Sakura to be very beautiful. She seems to believe that Sakura and Suzuki are a couple, referring to him as "her boyfriend." She may be in love with Terada.

Mizusawa (水沢, Mizusawa)

The self-proclaimed "bulls-eye aim" of the soccer team. He is in the 10th grade and in the same class as Suzuki and Sakura. After seeing Masashi as a "yakuza boss lady", Mizusawa instantly falls in love with him not knowing that he is a boy, and constantly tries to please him. He seems to be good friends with Suzuki.

Kosuke Terada (寺田, Terada Kosuke) Voiced by: Kentarō Itō (drama CD)

The 12th grade captain of the soccer club. He has a cheerful personality and is easily pleased. He is good friends with Nana and Nene, and is called "Samurai Hair" by Nana due to his samurai-like hair style. He may be in love with Nene.

Umeda (梅田, Umeda)

Takeshi's friend from school, who Takeshi calls "Ume-chan". He works at the cafe with Taizo and makes sure he doesn't do anything stupid. He is unfriendly and has a personality much like Nana and Nene.

Yukari Sonomura (園村 ゆかり, Sonomura Yukari)

Sakura's classmate in high school. Sonomura was in the same class as Katagiri during their second year in middle school, where she also developed a crush on him ever since he helped her out of an embarrassing cooking situation. She is dating Katagiri.

== Media ==
=== Manga ===
Original

1. ISBN 4-592-18801-2 published in January 2004
2. ISBN 4-592-18152-2 published in August 2004
3. ISBN 4-592-18153-0 published in February 2005
4. ISBN 4-592-18154-9 published in August 2005
5. ISBN 4-592-18155-7 published in March 2006
6. ISBN 4-592-18426-2 published in October 2006
7. ISBN 4-592-18427-0 published in April 2007
8. ISBN 4-592-18428-9 published in November 2007
9. ISBN 978-4-592-18429-4 published in April 2008
10. ISBN 4-592-18430-0 published in December 2008
11. ISBN 978-4-592-18543-7 published in July 2009

English

1. ISBN 1-4278-0071-5 published in July 2007
2. ISBN 1-4278-0072-3 published in November 2007
3. ISBN 1-4278-0073-1 published in March 2008
4. ISBN 1-4278-0074-X published in June 2008
5. ISBN 978-1-4278-0229-3 published in September 2008
6. ISBN 978-1-4278-0684-0 published in December 2008
7. ISBN 1-4278-0881-3 published in March 2009
8. ISBN 978-1-4278-1287-2 published in June 2009
9. ISBN 1-4278-1524-0 published in September 2009
10. ISBN 1-4278-1714-6 published in December 2009
11. ISBN 1-4278-1828-2 published in March 2010

=== Drama CD ===
The series was first adapted into a drama CD as the supplement of the April 2007 issue of LaLa compiled together with 3 other series, Kin'iro no Corda, Ryū no Hanawazurai and Kaichō wa Maid-sama! as LaLa Tokimeki Drama CD. There was a booklet enclosed together with the drama CD. Colored illustrations of the featured series were also given out as presents to random readers. Misato Fukuen, Takashi Kondō and Kenichi Suzumura voiced Sakura, Masashi and Tsuyoshi.

On July 25, 2007, a commercial drama CD was released by Marine Entertainment and the first pressing of the release contained a cellphone head cleaner. Customers who purchased the limited pressing directly from Marine Entertainment also received a B2-sized poster for the release.
