= Wonder (Mamoru Miyano album) =

- CD-only version

Studio album by Mamoru Miyano
- Released: August 4, 2010
- Genres: Pop, swing, rock
- Length: 56:18
- Label: King Records

Mamoru Miyano chronology
Break (2009)	Wonder (2010)	Fantasista (2012)

Singles from Wonder
- 1. "JS" Released: July 29, 2009; 2. "Refrain" Released: October 21, 2009

Wonder (stylized in all uppercase) is Japanese voice actor Mamoru Miyano's second studio album. It was released on August 4, 2010 by King Records. Two singles were released to promote the album, "JS" and "Refrain".

== Album information ==
The album was released in two formats; the regular CD format and a CD+DVD format. The latter contained the promotional videos of "JS", "Refrain", and the album's opening track "Wonder Love", as well as the making of "Wonder Love".

== Singles ==
The first single released was "JS" (stylized as "J☆S"), on July 29, 2009. The single peaked at No. 22 on the Oricon single charts and charted for two weeks.

== Track listing ==
CD
No.	Title	Lyrics	Music	Length
1.	"Wonder Love"	Mamoru Miyano	Jin Nakamura	4:34
2.	"Steal!!"	Juli Shono	Shoichiro Hirata	4:56
3.	"Sea Tide"	Eiji Kawai	Eiji Kawai	4:54
4.	"Ao no Tsubasa" (蒼ノ翼 "Blue Wings")	Noriyasu Agematsu (Elements Garden)	Noriyasu Agematsu (Elements Garden)	4:07
5.	"Refrain"	Mamoru Miyano	Jin Nakamura	4:48
6.	"Body Rock"	STY	STY	3:50
7.	"Sakasama Chikyū" (逆さま地球 "Inverted Earth")	RyoRca	Jun Ichikawa	4:52
8.	"JS" (Stylized as "J☆S". Stands for "Just Smile")	0 Soul 7	0 Soul 7	4:35
9.	"Splash Blue (Wondering Lil Mix)"	Ucio	Toshimichi Tsuge	4:28
10.	"Hakuchūmu" (白昼夢 "Daydream")	Yūsuke Toriumi	Kōsuke Noma	4:27
11.	"My World"	Tomomi Narimoto	Tomomi Narimoto	4:47
12.	"Not Alone"	Ucio	Toshimichi Tsuge	5:56
Total length:				56:18
