= Break (Mamoru Miyano album) =

Studio album by Mamoru Miyano
- Released: March 11, 2009
- Recorded: 2007–2009
- Genre: Pop
- Label: King Records

Mamoru Miyano chronology
Break (2009)	Wonder (2010)

Singles from Break
- 1. "Kuon" Released: May 23, 2007; 2. "Discovery" Released: June 4, 2008; 3. "...Kimi e" Released: December 3, 2008

Break is the debut album by Japanese voice actor and actor turned singer, Mamoru Miyano. The album was released on March 11, 2009. The album was released in two formats: CD and CD+DVD version. Break contains the three singles that were released in 2007 and 2008.

== Track listing ==
No.	Title	Length
1.	"Break a Road"	3:22
2.	"KissxKiss"	5:02
3.	"Discovery"	4:21
4.	"Be"	3:54
5.	"Nocturne"	5:40
6.	"...Kimi e (…君へ, ...To You)"	5:51
7.	"Itsuka (いつか, Sometime)"	4:08
8.	"Sotsugyō Days feat. Smily Spiky (卒業デイズ feat. SMILY☆SPIKY, Graduation Days)"	4:36
9.	"Boku no Kiseki (ぼくのキセキ, My Miracle)"	3:58
10.	"Kuon (久遠, Eternity)"	4:16
11.	"Rain"	4:05
12.	"Ai ni Iku yo (会いに行くよ, Meeting You)"	4:29

DVD
No.	Title	Length
1.	"Discovery (Music Clip)"
2.	"...Kimi e (Music Clip)"
3.	"Be (Music Clip)"

== Charts ==
Chart	Peak position	Sales total
Oricon Daily Chart	10	
Oricon Weekly Chart	20	6,611
