= List of Uta no Prince-sama episodes =

The following is a list of episodes for the anime series Uta no Prince-sama: Maji Love 1000% (うたの☆プリンスさまっ♪マジLOVE1000%), which began airing in Japan on July 3, 2011. The second season of the anime series, Uta no Prince-sama: Maji Love 2000% (うたの☆プリンスさまっ♪マジLOVE2000%), finished airing in Japan on June 27, 2013. A third season aired from April 5, 2015, and under the name Uta no Prince sama: Maji Love Revolutions. On June 27, 2015, following the broadcast of the last episode of the third season, the ending message revealed that a fourth season has been confirmed. The fourth season, titled Uta no Prince-sama Maji LOVE Legend Star, aired on October 2, 2016.

== Episode list ==
=== Season 1 (Maji Love 1000%) ===
No. in season	Title	Original air date
1	"Seven-colored Compass"; Transliteration: "Nanairo no Konpasu" (Japanese: 七色のコンパス)	July 3, 2011
Haruka Nanami is passionate of becoming a songwriter in order to one day compose a song for her idol, Hayato. During the entrance exam, she was late due to helping a little girl who was lost on the way to the exam venue, Saotome Academy. After meeting her teacher and other people from her class, she met others from the S Class. She found someone resembling Hayato while chasing the cat but found out he was Hayato's twin brother, Tokiya Ichinose.
2	"Brand New Melody"	July 10, 2011
All classes in Saotome Academy were assigned a project, to compose a new song with a partner; however, there is a twist: the idol group have to write the lyrics and the songwriter group have to write the music. Haruka then hums a melody she thought of at the lake in the middle of the night where Otoya heard her and came up with lyrics on the spot. The two then progressed fast and their song was successful.
3	"Knocking on the Mind"	July 17, 2011
Both Haruka and Otoya passed the project, but now Haruka has to deal with the bullying from her classmates because they suspect that she cheated. When she is asked to play the piano again in front of the class, the comments finally get to her and she freezes up once again, making the situation worse. Masato Hijirikawa understands her troubles and helps her work through them.
4	"Believe Heart to the End of the World"; Transliteration: "Sekai no Hate made Believe Heart" (Japanese: 世界の果てまでBelieve Heart)	July 24, 2011
Ren Jinguuji is going to get expelled if he doesn't give his lyrics to Hyuuga-sensei. But with help from Haruka and everyone else, he finishes his song.
5	"Full Throttle Chivalrous Spirit Go! Fight!!"; Transliteration: "Otokogi Zenkai Go! Fight!!" (Japanese: 男気全開 Go!Fight!!)	July 31, 2011
Syo Kurusu really wants to audition for a part in Hyuuga's new movie the "Prince of Precipices"; unfortunately, he is so scared of heights that there is no way he can get the part. However, all his friends band together to cure him of his fear— maybe they overdid it a little.
6	"Shout Out from Orion"; Transliteration: "Orion de SHOUT OUT" (Japanese: オリオンでSHOUT OUT)	August 7, 2011
Haruka is going to Hayato's concert by herself, all of her friends were worried about her getting lost! And she did but ended up meeting Natsuki Shinomiya with a different personality...... Haruka, Natsuki, and Syo all went to Hayato's concert. Besides finding out about Natsuki's different personality, she also found out something about Hayato.
7	"Feeling Heart"	August 14, 2011
Haruka is being praised by Ringo Tsukimiya, saying that her piano performance is what should be expected from the girl who got the highest score in the current month's songwriting contest. After class, Haruka saw Tokiya Ichinose and confronted him that she knew the truth. She wonders why Tokiya is doing that kind of pretending when as Hayato, he is already popular and doesn't need to attend school.
8	"Eternity Love"	August 21, 2011
As other students are picking their partners for the final assessment, Haruka is afraid of asking Tokiya to be her partner after their previous tense conversation. On the beach, Otoya confesses to her that he loves her music and that he has chosen her as his desired partner. Haruka begs him to sing which Tokiya agrees to, saying he will start again.
9	"Weaving Dreams"; Transliteration: "Tsumuida Yumetachi" (Japanese: 紡いだ夢たち)	August 28, 2011
Haruka is confronted by Otoya, who speaks out his desire to have her as his graduation audition partner. Later, she is also told by Ren the same thing that Otoya had said. Not so long after, Syo, Natsuki, and Masato do the same. Hesitant on whom to choose, Haruka asks for her teacher's advice, but she is rejected.
10	"Come On, Let's Song!"; Transliteration: "Sā, Let's song!!" (Japanese: さあ、Let's song!!)	September 4, 2011
Haruka became the topic of the school because of having six persons who listed her for the pairing. The next day, Otoya, Tokiya, Ren, Syo, Natsuki, and Masato were all called out by Haruka to the 3rd Music Room. Some agree to it immediately while others are skeptical at first.
11	"Map Of The Future"; Transliteration: "Mirai Chizu" (Japanese: 未来地図)	September 11, 2011
Himura, Tokiya's manager learns that he is a student in Saotome Academy. He Meanwhile, Haruka and the other members begin working on a new song she wrote called "Map of the Future". Everyone noticed that Tokiya is always late for rehearsals because of his "part-time job" but they don't have any idea what it is, except for Haruka. His return will be delayed due to a landslide and will take him until morning.
12	"The Heart of a Lost Child"; Transliteration: "Maigo no Kokoro" (Japanese: 迷子のココロ)	September 18, 2011
Paparazzi have infiltrated Saotome Academy and found out that Tokiya is really Hayato. Everyone is shocked by this, and Tokiya explained his reason for disguising himself as his own younger twin brother to everyone and humbly asked to be part of their group. The Principal witnessed their new resolve as a group and announced their debut as the idol group Starish to the media.
13	"Serious Love 1000%"; Transliteration: "Maji Love 1000%" (Japanese: マジLOVE1000%)	September 25, 2011
Haruka cannot accept the fact that she was cut off and suddenly went home to her grandmother in the country. There, her grandmother reminded her of her love for music and Haruka rediscovered her resolve. Before she was able to come back, Starish came to pick her up and they performed "Map of The Future" for her and her grandmother. Starish makes their debut with Maji Love 1000%".

=== Season 2 (Maji Love 2000%) ===
No. in season	Title	Original air date
1	"Poison Kiss"; Transliteration: "Powazon Kiss" (Japanese: ポワゾンKISS)	April 4, 2013
Haruka meets up with her Starish colleagues and they eventually meet up at their large training room, where Haruka gives everyone an individual song. Suddenly, Shining Saotome arrives and introduces Quartet Night who perform the song "Poison Kiss". Quartet Night become mentors to Starish, but that won't be as easy as it seems, as they will be living with their superior mentors who have many rules for them. At the end, Cecil greets Haruka by kissing her on the hand and calls her "my beloved princess".
2	"Reincarnation of Love"; Transliteration: "Ai no Reincarnation" (Japanese: 愛のReincarnation)	April 11, 2013
Haruka finds herself meeting once again Cecil, whom believes that Haruka is his savior and attempts to thank her with a kiss. Meanwhile, Starish members also become aware of a melody being sung and see Haruka running towards the voice. Upon Haruka and Cecil's reunion, he tries to kiss her once again, but all his attempts are blocked by Starish. However, Cecil has no interest in being an idol and only wishes to sing Haruka's songs. Camus, being annoyed by this, challenges Cecil and Starish to a training competition to demonstrate that there is more to singing songs and being an idol.
3	"True Wing"	April 18, 2013
When the members of Starish think they've become full-fledged idols after releasing a CD and getting job offers, Shining Saotome tells them they are far from being true idols. Shining suggests that in order to become great idols, Starish must win the UtaPri Award. Meanwhile, Syo gets his first job in a two-hour special episode of the 'Prince of Fight'. He expresses his excitement to work alongside Hyuga who rebuffs him. This does not diminish Syo's determination to do well until he is asked to jump from one platform to another at a great height. However, when Haruka almost falls off the platform, it is then when he is able to make the jump to save her. When that scene is over and done with, Hyuga approached Syo and he apologizes for not appreciating a fan.
4	"Love Sakura"; Transliteration: "Koizakura" (Japanese: 恋桜)	April 25, 2013
Masato is invited to audition for the lead role in a historical play, Singing Swordsman of Justice. Since Masato doesn't understand the true fundamentals of acting and performing, this poses a threat to him passing the audition and to Starish's chance of winning the UtaPri award. Cecil suggests to Masato that he imagines the woman he has to embrace at the audition.
5	"Smile Magic"	May 2, 2013
Starish is very impressed with how much Otoya has improved with his singing. Otoya later goes to appear on a variety show along with Cecil. When Cecil is asked to do impressions on the show, Otoya is worried. The school is holding an annual bazaar with a haunted house, which Haruka and Otoya help out with. When the children start feeling down, Otoya tells them to cheer up and starts singing, and his song attract a crowd of customers.
6	"Orange Rhapsody"; Transliteration: "Orenji Rapusodī" (Japanese: オレンジラプソディ)	May 9, 2013
Ren is invited to be a model for the Japan Boys Collection fashion show. The show is sponsored by the Jinguji Group, which brings back unpleasant memories for Ren. Haruka, Cecil and Tomochika attend the show, and not long into it there is a power outage. After the show, Ren reconnects with his brother to find out he didn't force Ren to become an idol just to benefit the Jinguji Group, but because he loved his songs.
7	"Promise to Sirius"; Transliteration: "Shiriusu e no Chikai" (Japanese: シリウスへの誓い)	May 16, 2013
Natsuki gets a job for a gravure lipstick ad, unaware that it was actually meant for Satsuki. Syo and Haruka reveals to the others the truth about Natsuki's split-personality. Recognizing Satsuki instantly, Syo and the others try to put Natsuki's glasses back on to return him to normal, but fail and are locked on the rooftop. Satsuki takes Cecil's sunglasses to voluntarily revert himself back to Natsuki, and Haruka gives Cecil a song she composed for him.
8	"Fantasia of the Stars"; Transliteration: "Hoshi no Fantajia" (Japanese: 星のファンタジア)	May 23, 2013
Starish, Quartet Night, Haruka and Cecil take a vacation at the Shining Agency's resort house. Haruka is busy trying to write a new Starish song, but with not much success. Later that evening, Cecil prays to the Muse to give his song lyrics, and then sings the finished product. Starish begins singing along with Cecil in perfect harmony, and Haruka realizes that she couldn't write a new song because it didn't include Cecil's voice before. Cecil later receives a letter from the king of Agnapolis saying to return immediately and take over the throne.
9	"We are STARISH"	May 30, 2013
Everyone is shocked to hear that Cecil has gone back to Agnapolis, but some of them believe he will come back. Haruka has also finished a new song for Starish to include Cecil's voice. The rest of Starish are excited to sing the new song, but it cannot be finished without Cecil. Just then, Cecil returns and insists that Shining listens to Haruka's new song, knowing he will regret it if he doesn't. Starish performs "Maji Love 2000%" and win Shining's approval to become a new seven-member group.
10	"Crystal Time"	June 6, 2013
He Vens gets a formal introduction as they accept their nomination for the UtaPri award. Not only is He Vens favored to win the award, but their boss is longtime rival of Shining Saotome, Raging Ōtori. Both Shining and Raging also threaten that the losing group will disband. Later, Starish and Heavens finally meet each other in person outside a recording studio. Back at the Shining Agency in the evening, Tokiya is singing his finished song from Haruka by the lake when he notices Haruka walking alone, looking rather troubled.
11	"Dreamer's Symphony"; Transliteration: "Yumeoibito e no Symphony" (Japanese: 夢追人へのSymphony)	June 13, 2013
Tokiya invites Haruka to listen to the song she gave him (Crystal Time), which he sang in an advertisement that is being played in the city. After the song finishes, Tokiya meets up with Haruka and takes her to a local festival. Haruka comments on how Tokiya's singing was different than usual in his song. The rest of Starish meets up with the two and sing "Dreamer's Symphony".
12	"HEAVENS Gate"	June 20, 2013
Starish is busy preparing for the UtaPri Award show, but Cecil is having trouble learning choreography because he's used to only dancing the Agnadance of his home country. Syo offers to teach Cecil how to dance, surprising everyone since they never got along initially. On the day of the award show, Haruka runs into Heavens. The show begins with HEAVENS singing "HEAVENS Gate", leaving everyone in awe.
13	"Serious Love 2000%"; Transliteration: "Maji Love 2000%" (Japanese: マジLOVE2000%)	June 27, 2013
After blowing everyone away way with their performance, Heavens announces that the competition is pointless, thinking they're going to win. Backstage, Raging Ōtori confronts Shining Saotome, thanking him for Haruka's impressive song. Once finished, everyone at the concert becomes affected by the waves of The Happy Pulse. Starish also requests to sing another song along with the audience. The episode ends with everyone singing "Maji Love 1000%".
14	"Serious Love 2000% Special" (Japanese: Shining Star Xmas)	Unaired, BD/DVD Only, Raw
Haruka and her friends organize a Christmas party and talk about childhood memories. Both ST☆RISH and QUARTET★NIGHT perform a new song: "Shining Star Xmas".

=== Season 3 (Maji Love Revolutions) ===
No. in season	Title	Original air date
1	"The Dice are Cast"	April 4, 2015
Haruka meets the cast again after a period of not seeing each other. Shining Saotome announces that QUARTET★NIGHT will be the main act to perform in the sports event Triple S, and that Haruka will compose their song. ST☆RISH complains about this decision and decides that they'll have to prove themselves worthy by participating into a whole new project called Cross Units.
2	"GOLDEN☆STAR"	April 11, 2015
Each senior and underclassmen unit gets a variety show skit: Otoya, Tokiya and Reiji work in a daycare; Ranmaru, Masato and Ren take a stroll through town; Natsuki, Sho and Ai are confronted with a test of courage and Camus and Cecil drink some tea and try pastries at a tea shop. All the seniors show their skills leaving the juniors in admiration and thinking about how they can improve themselves. Later on, the whole cast goes to the beach.
3	"EMOTIONAL LIFE"	April 18, 2015
Natsuki and Otoya are made into a Cross Unit and are cast as the main characters in a rock opera. Natsuki is put to play the part of a hot-headed manly guy while Otoya has to learn to be collected and cool. Both consult with their respective members (Syo and Tokiya) hoping to get some advice from them but without much luck. It is then that they both realize that they have been looking at things the wrong way and shouldn't be so worried about completely changing themselves. With the help of their friends and Haruka, they are able perform a brand new song in the play.
4	"Innocent Wind"	April 25, 2015
Ai becomes the main character in a new film. He works along with Syo and Natsuki both left in awe at how perfectly he does everything, however, Ai begins to feel something has changed within him. Ai ends up overworking himself and becomes ill but refuses to rest resulting in him collapsing. Both Syo and Natsuki, along with Haruka, put Ai to rest and in the process learn that he is a robot. After explaining, the three help Ai to finish the film.
5	"Code: T.V.U."	May 2, 2015
Syo, Ren and Cecil are made into a Cross Unit and are selected to be featured in a commercial for a mobile phone brand. Things head off to a rocky start with each member's conflicting ideas about what the theme for the commercial should be. They end up getting into a heated argument but realize that their fellow member's ideas were just as good as theirs. In the end, with help from Haruka and their friends, they are able to come up with the perfect theme for the commercial and Haruka's new song.
6	"Saintly Territory"	May 9, 2015
Camus is chosen as the main act in the inauguration of the Shining Tower. Haruka, hoping to learn more about Camus to write him a new song, ends up working as his assistant. Although the tasks are difficult, Haruka does not give up determined to see a side to Camus in which he can do something earnestly seeing as he always does everything perfectly but without being earnest. Haruka's feelings are able to reach Camus and he performs his new song at the inauguration.
7	"ONLY ONE"	May 16, 2015
Ranmaru has decided to leave rock music as a way to move from his past and focus on his new life as a QUARTET★NIGHT member. Everyone opposes saying that rock is his life but he refuses to listen. Due to a past experience, Ranmaru is afraid of making the same mistakes again with his new found band members but Haruka teaches him that his love for rock and his band can be balanced without giving up on either.
8	"ORIGINAL RESONANCE"	May 23, 2015
Tokiya and Masato are set in a Cross Unit and work with each other in order to write lyrics for Haruka's song. Everyone thinks they are a perfect pair and look forward to their new song, but with them being the last to perform and everyone having high expectations, the pressure gets to them and they are unable to come up with any good lyrics. They try many things to be able to focus and relax but to no avail. Haruka then comes to them with some food revealing that everyone just wants them to do their best and that they are thinking about them. This gives Tokiya and Masato the encouragement they need to write the lyrics and perform their song.
9	"NEVER..."	May 30, 2015
Reiji takes a special liking to Haruka while Tokiya and Otoya feel overshadowed by his senior.
10	"Answer"	June 6, 2015
QUARTET★NIGHT and Haruka go on a trip to learn more about each other and write a song for Triple S. Haruka's kindness will inspire them to make a new song, they first they're able to make together.
11	Transliteration: "Sankyu" (Japanese: サンキュ)	June 13, 2015
ST☆RISH debates about what to do about Haruka since she's gotten close to QUARTET★NIGHT. They also tell ST☆RISH they'll fight for keeping Haruka as their composer. As soon as she returns, they sing her a new song, "THANK YOU".
12	"Evolution・Eve"; Transliteration: "Eboryuushon・Ivu" (Japanese: エボリューション・イヴ)	June 20, 2015
It's finally time for the Triple S concert, and QUARTET★NIGHT performs again (although in a longer and polished version) their song "Evolution Eve", leaving ST☆RISH, Haruka and the whole theater impressed.
13	"Maji LOVE Revolutions"; Transliteration: "Maji LOVE Reboryuushonzu" (Japanese: マジLOVEレボリューションズ)	June 27, 2015
QUARTET★NIGHT and ST☆RISH fight for the entry song of the SSS competition. As soon as the judges are deciding which one of the two contestants will win, HE★VENS has their debut since their defeat to ST☆RISH during the UtaPri Award, debuting now as a 7-member band. The battle continues on for the confirmed 4th season.

=== Season 4 (Maji Love Legend Star) ===
No. in season	Title	Original air date
1	"Turning Dreams Into Music!"; Transliteration: "Yume wo Uta e To...!" (Japanese: 夢を歌へと...！)	October 2, 2016
When QUARTET★NIGHT is chosen to perform as the Triple S Opening Artist, they decline the opportunity after ST☆RISH and HE★VENS give equally compelling performances. Raging Otori and Shining Saotome propose another musical showdown to determine the opening artist between the three groups. To ensure a fair competition, they must sing songs written by Haruka! Who will win the decisive concert and the honor of performing at the Triple S?
2	"KIZUNA"	October 9, 2016
The members of ST☆RISH and HE★VENS are shocked to learn they will be singing duets with members from the other group to prepare for the decisive concert. Meanwhile, QUARTET★NIGHT appears to be experiencing some discord of its own.
3	"Mighty Aura"	October 16, 2016
As the first to do his duet, Tokiya realizes Eiji's talent. Worried that ST☆RISH's talent isn't enough, he crafts a plan for the team to take their competition more seriously.
4	"JUSTICE IMPULSE"	October 23, 2016
The second group of the Duet Project is Syo of ST☆RISH and Yamato of HE★VENS. Syo is excited to sing a duet with Hyuga Ryuya's younger brother, but a powerful rivalry with his older brother surges through Yamato's heart.
5	"Visible Elf"	October 30, 2016
The third duo of the Duet Project are Cecil of ST☆RISH and Shion of HE★VENS. Trying to follow up on Tokiya and Syo's success, Cecil aggressively approaches the project, but Shion closes off his heart more and more as though in response to Cecil's passion.
6	"Lovely Eyes"	November 5, 2016
The fourth duo of the Duet Project are Ren of ST☆RISH and Van of HE★VENS who are also slated to play rivals in a TV drama. When Van begins aggressively pursuing Haruka, Ren heads straight into battle with his own passionate feelings hidden in his heart.
7	"Grown empathy"	November 12, 2016
The fifth duo of the Duet Project are Natsuki of ST☆RISH and Nagi of HE★VENS. Nagi persists to perform their duet project with musical instruments: Natsuki playing the violin while Nagi plays the viola. This causes Natsuki to start recollecting unpleasant memories, prompting "Satsuki" to step in.
8	"Lasting Oneness"	November 19, 2016
The sixth duo of the Duet Project are Masato of ST☆RISH and Kira of HE★VENS. Masato is suddenly called back to the Hijirikawa family after his father collapses, which puts a strain on his Duet Project with Kira. Upon returning home, Masato is pressured into taking over the family business prompting Ren and Kira to confront him about his true ambitions.
9	"NEXT DOOR"	November 26, 2016
As the last duo of the Duet Project, Eiichi is determined to produce a "soul-shaking" themed song with Otoya. When Eiichi explains to Otoya that he must face his true self that exists deep inside his heart to do so, he stoically engages in writing the lyrics. However, gradually he becomes less and less like himself.
10	"We believe you"	December 3, 2016
Leaving behind a completed duet, Otoya disappears. Having been exposed to a side of Otoya they'd never known before through his voice, the members of ST☆RISH search for clues that will lead them to Otoya. They eventually arrive at the truth behind his personal history.
11	"Future, Dreams, Thank You... and!" Transliteration: "Mirai, Yume, Arigatou...Soshite!" (Japanese: 未来、夢、ありがとう...そして!)	December 10, 2016
Reuniting in the sunflower field, ST☆RISH reassures Otoya that they will always love him as a member of ST☆RISH no matter what has happened to him in the past. They successfully makes it to their live broadcast while becoming the talk of the town. With the Duet Project finished, ST☆RISH and HE★VENS are set to start working towards the Decisive Concert. However, a plot to drive them towards despair is approaching.
12	"Three shining stars"	December 17, 2016
The emotions and hopes of ST☆RISH, QUARTET★NIGHT, and HE★VENS are illuminated by a morning sun rising in a clear sky. As Haruka prays for similar things, the Decisive Concert is about to begin. QUARTET★NIGHT and HE★VENS perform first, and both groups give equally compelling performances.
13	"WE ARE ST☆RISH!!"	December 24, 2016
ST☆RISH is up next and the tension is thick. Who will come out victorious in this action-packed showdown?
