= Mamoru Miyano =

Japanese voice actor (born 1983)

- 宮野 真守
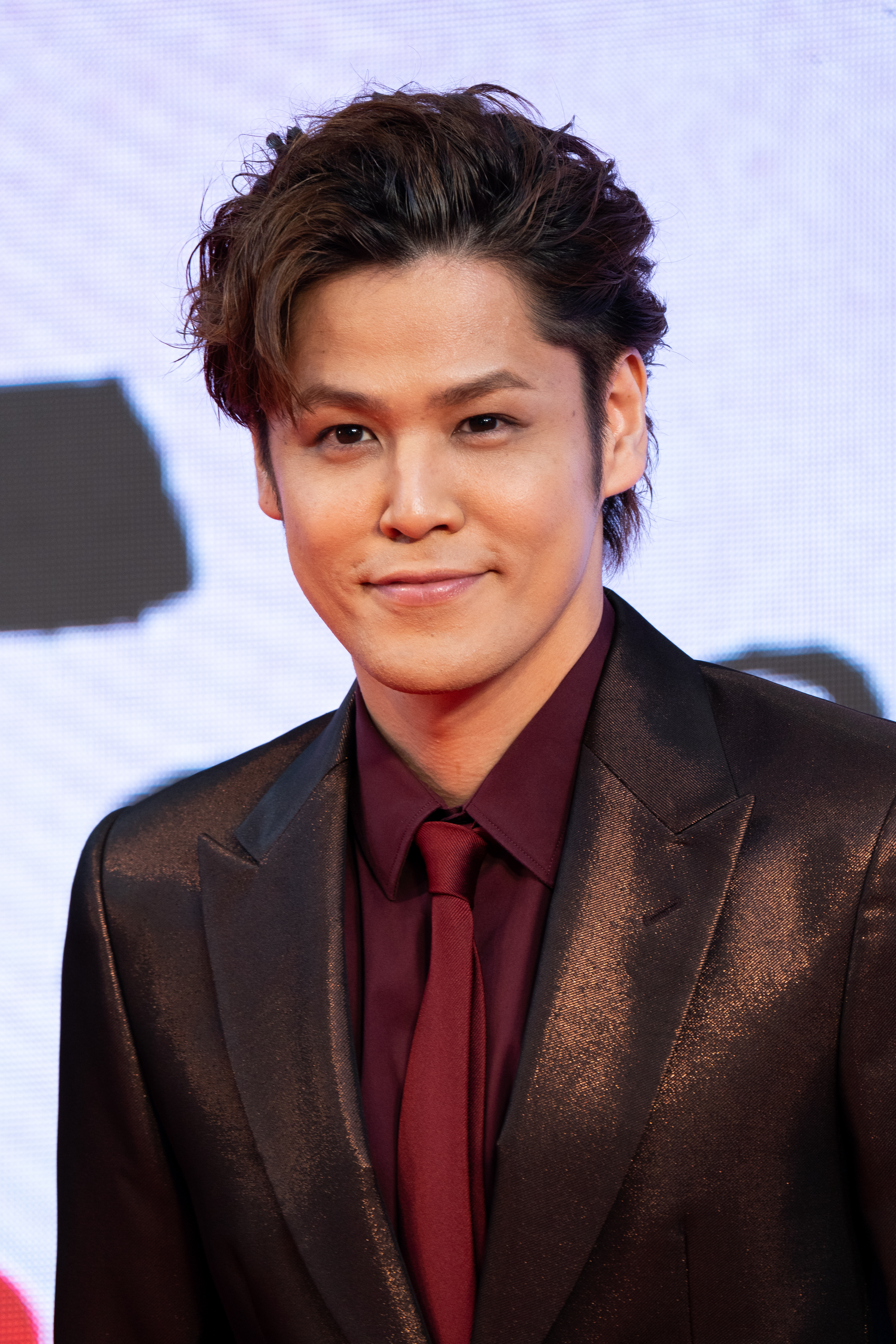
- Miyano at the 2019 Tokyo International Film Festival
- Born: June 8, 1983 (age 43); Saitama Prefecture, Japan
- Occupations: Actor; voice actor; singer
- Years active: 1990–present
- Musical career
- Genres: J-pop; rock; anime song
- Instrument: Vocals
- Years active: 2007–present
- Labels: King Records; Mastersix Foundation
- Website: miyanomamoru.com

Mamoru Miyano (宮野 真守, Miyano Mamoru; born June 8, 1983) is a Japanese actor and singer. He is best known for his voice acting roles in Death Note, Inazuma Eleven, Steins;Gate, Mobile Suit Gundam 00, Durarara!!, Soul Eater, Wolf's Rain, Ouran High School Host Club, Oshi No Ko, Ajin: Demi-Human, Fullmetal Alchemist: Brotherhood, Free!, Hunter x Hunter, Chihayafuru, Bungo Stray Dogs, Persona 5, Zombieland Saga, Fire Force, and Pluto. Nominated for the "Best Lead Actor Award" at the 1st Seiyu Awards in 2007 for his role as Light Yagami in Death Note, at the 2nd Seiyu Awards in 2008, he won the award for his role as Setsuna F. Seiei in Mobile Suit Gundam 00 and Hakugen Rikuson in Kōtetsu Sangokushi. That same year, he won the "Best Voice Actor" award at the 2008 Tokyo International Anime Fair. His debut single, "Kuon" (久遠; lit. Eternity), was released under King Records in 2007. In March 2009, his debut album, Break, was released.

== Personal life ==
Miyano was born in Saitama Prefecture. He joined Himawari Theatre Group under the influence of his older brother Shota, though he did not attend the class often. After entering high school, due to the uncertainty he felt toward the future, Miyano skipped singing and dance lessons. While taking music lessons, he discovered his musical style through music produced by singers such as CHEMISTRY and Exile. In 2008, Miyano announced that he was married and that his wife was pregnant. Their son was born later that year. On December 21, 2023, Miyano released a statement on his official website announcing his divorce.

== Career ==
=== 1992–2008: Early roles and musical breakthrough ===
Miyano portrayed a boy in a flashback in Tokusou Exceedraft. In 2001, he debuted as a voice actor in the live action teen drama Caitlin's Way. He voiced Riku in the Japanese version of the video game Kingdom Hearts, reprising the role in Kingdom Hearts: Chain of Memories and the remake Kingdom Hearts Re:Chain of Memories as well as Kingdom Hearts II. His first anime role was in Shin Megami Tensei: Devil Children - Light & Dark. Other voice roles included Kiba in the anime series Wolf's Rain, The Prince of Tennis Musical as Tetsu Ishida, and Light Yagami in Death Note. For his performance as Yagami, he was nominated for two awards at the inaugural Seiyuu Awards: "Best Lead Actor" and "Best New Actor". He made his film debut in The Prince of Tennis.

Miyano made his singing debut, releasing his first single, "Kuon" (久遠; Eternity), under the King Records label on May 28, 2007. "Kuon" debuted at #47 on the Oricon charts, being used as the theme song for the finale of anime series Kōtetsu Sangokushi. He released a duet with Romi Park, entitled "Fight", which debuted at # 73 on the Oricon chart on June 13, 2007. He voiced Setsuna F. Seiei, the main character in Mobile Suit Gundam 00, winning his first award, "Best Voice Actor", at the 2008 Tokyo International Anime Fair for his portrayal of Seiei and Yagami.

On June 4, 2008, he released his second single, "Discovery", used as the opening theme for the video game Fushigi Yūgi: Suzaku Ibun. The song debuted at # 24 on the Oricon chart. In August, Miyano released the character single "Soup/Hakosora", entitled "Mamoru Miyano Comes Across Setsuna F. Seiei" (宮野真守 come across 刹那・F・セイエイ), debuting at # 18. In December, he released his third single, "...Kimi e" (...君へ; ...To You), which also debuted at # 18. That year, Miyano reprised the role of Seiei for the second season of Mobile Suit Gundam 00, for which he won his first Seiyuu Award and another for the role of Hakugen Rikuson in Kōtetsu Sangokushi. He also voiced Zero Kiryu and Ichiru Kiryu in Vampire Knight and Vampire Knight Guilty, Death The Kid in the anime Soul Eater, Tamaki Suoh in the anime version of Ouran High School Host Club, Rintaro Okabe (Hououin Kyoma) in Steins Gate, Ling Yao in Fullmetal Alchemist: Brotherhood, Oda Nobunaga in Nobunaga the Fool, Rin Matsuoka in Free!, and Osamu Dazai in Bungou Stray Dogs. Miyano also appeared on-camera, including a guest spot on the 2008 drama The Quiz Show.

=== 2009–present: Subsequent success ===
On March 11, 2009, Miyano released his debut album, Break, which debuted at number 20. On April 11, 2009, a month after the release of the album, Miyano went on his first tour, 1st Live Tour 2009: Breaking. He also starred as Ultraman Zero, the son of Ultraseven, in the tokusatsu film Mega Monster Battle: Ultra Galaxy Legend The Movie before starring in subsequent films Ultraman Zero: The Revenge of Belial and Ultraman Saga. Lacking a series of his own, Zero continued to appear as the main host of Ultraman Retsuden/Shin Ultraman Retsuden and in subsequent Ultra Series entries, most recently in Ultraman Z in 2020.

In 2010, Miyano released his second album, Wonder, which charted at number 20 on the Oricon Weekly Albums chart. Following the album's release, Miyano went on his second tour, Mamoru Miyano Live Tour 2010: Wondering. He also voiced Dent in the Pokémon anime series and starred in Daisuke Namikawa's live action film Wonderful World.

Miyano participated in the 2011 theatrical play Ultraman Premier in Tokyo, where he portrayed Shin Moroboshi, the human guise of Ultraman Zero. In April 2012, Miyano released his third album, Fantasista, which charted at number 4 on the Oricon Weekly Albums chart. Miyano made his first appearance on NHK's music variety show Music Japan. In 2013, he became the first male voice actor to perform solo at Nippon Budokan arena.

In April 2014, he released the DVD for his 5th live tour, "～TRAVELING!～". The following month, he began his 6th live tour ~Wakening!~, where he traveled around Japan. The DVD for the tour was released on January 28, 2015.

In 2015, he became the first male voice actor with a number 1 single on the Oricon daily chart.

On July 10, 2016, he was one of the performers who appeared in "Ultraman Day", a festival celebrating the 50th anniversary of the Ultra Series.

On February 11 and 12, 2017, he held his first solo foreign concert in Taiwan. In June 2017, he became the first male voice actor to top the weekly Blu-ray chart.

In December 2018, Miyano appeared at the FNS Music Festival, alongside Nana Mizuki and Hiromi Go. In October 2023, Miyano voiced Epsilon in the anime miniseries Pluto. In December 2024, Miyano voiced Michael Kaiser in the second season of anime series Blue Lock. In June 2025, it was announced that, due to Miyano's contract with Himawari Theatre Group expiring, he would be joining Ken-On.

== Awards ==
Year	Award	Category	Nominated work	Result	Ref.
2007	1st Seiyu Awards	Best Lead Actor	Death Note	Nominated	
2007	1st Seiyu Awards	Best New Actor	Death Note	Nominated	
2008	2nd Seiyu Awards	Best Lead Actor	Mobile Suit Gundam 00, Koutetsu Sangokushi	Won	
2008	Tokyo Anime Award	Best Voice Actor		Won	
2011	Newtype Anime Awards	Best Lead Actor		Won	
2012	6th Seiyu Awards	Best Supporting Actor	Uta no Prince-sama, Chihayafuru, Steins;Gate	Won	
2012	6th Seiyu Awards	Best Musical Performance	STARISH (with Takuma Terashima, Junichi Suwabe, Kenichi Suzumura, Kisho Taniyama, and Hiro Shimono)	Won	
2012	34th Anime Grand Prix	Voice Actor of the Year		Won	
2013	Japan Anican Awards	Male Voice Actor		Won	
2013	Japan Anican Awards	CD Album		Won	
2014	8th Seiyu Awards	Best Musical Performance	—N/a	Won	
2015	57th Japan Record Awards	Planning Award		Won	
2018	Newtype Anime Awards	Best Voice Actor		Won	
2018	3rd Crunchyroll Anime Awards	Best VA Performance (Japanese)	Zombie Land Saga	Won	
2019	Tokyo Anime Award	Best Sound/Performance		Won	
2020	14th Seiyu Awards	Influencer Award		Won	
