= List of Princess Resurrection episodes =

This is a list of the episodes of the anime television series Princess Resurrection.

== Episode list ==
No.	Title	Original release date
1	"Princess Resurrection"; Transliteration: "Sosei Oujo" (Japanese: 蘇生王女)	April 13, 2007
Hiro Hiyorimi passes by a mansion in the care of his sister, though he believes he is lost. As he wanders into the shopping district, he saves a mysterious girl from being crushed by falling construction beams, sacrificing his life in the process. As a token of her appreciation, the girl, later recognized as Hime, revives Hiro after he lays dead on the hospital bed. He runs back to the mansion, only to see Hime surrounded by a pack of werewolves led by Lobo Wildman. Hime manages to kill Wildman, thanks to Hiro's intervention. Because Hime has given Hiro immortal life, he is now bound to be her servant forever.
2	"Princess Destruction"; Transliteration: "Hakai Oujo" (Japanese: 破壊王女)	April 20, 2007
As an invisible man enters the mansion to assassinate Hime, she goes wild with a chainsaw chasing him, but to no luck. After the invisible man covers the hallways with invisible threads, Hiro gets caught by these traps, but Hime and Flandre manage to save him. With his life force fading and needing restoration, Hiro slowly comes to realize that he has no choice but to be involved with Hime. After injuring the invisible man and following him into the basement, Hime eventually sets the mansion on fire. The invisible man tries to escape from the mansion, but Hime is able to slash him when seeing him on fire.
3	"Princess Rampage"; Transliteration: "Bousou Oujo" (Japanese: 暴走王女)	April 27, 2007
Riza Wildman, half-sister of the werewolf Lobo Wildman killed by Hime, comes to claim her revenge. Hiro tries to stop her from attacking Hime, but to no avail. Hime and Flandre, driving a truck, trail Riza outside to a dead end, where Hime tells Riza that her actions would be shaming Wildman's death. Riza had not realize until now that she herself was used as a chess piece to make Wildman betray Hime. She later goes to her brother's grave and mourns for his death before she departs.
4	"Princess Negotiation"; Transliteration: "Koushou Oujo" (Japanese: 交渉王女)	May 4, 2007
Hime, Hiro, and Flandre, with Riza in tow, travel to Hime's lake resort to relax. At night, their resort is suddenly pulled down into the lake, which has them evacuate the area. They are surrounded and then captured by a race of mermen who are after Hime's immortality powers. When a giant merman named Poseidon challenges Hime to a duel, Riza steps in and accept the challenge in her place. Although Riza struggles as she fights Poseidon, a full moon appears in the sky, giving her the strength to defeat him. The next day, Riza declares her intention to stick close to Hime in order to find an opportunity to take her revenge on one of Hime's siblings, the one responsible for making Wildman betray Hime.
5	"Princess Bloodline"; Transliteration: "Kettou Oujo" (Japanese: 血統王女)	May 11, 2007
Reiri Kamura, a beautiful girl at the academy, approaches Hiro and later tells him to meet her on the school rooftop. There, she is revealed to be a vampire and sucks Hiro's blood, later turning him into her vampire slave. Using her werewolf instincts, Riza finds Reiri, who tells her that this is a ruse to gain access to the mansion and obtain Hime's powers by sucking her blood. Riza tries to stall Reiri for as long as she can, but to no use. Hiro returns to the mansion, but Hime weakens him with apotropaics. However, Hiro is later able to invite Reiri inside the mansion. Hime first is unable to land a blow on Reiri, but when Hime uses a wooden stake to startle Reiri, she lets Reiri off with a warning never to attack her again.
6	"Princess Alliance"; Transliteration: "Doumei Oujo" (Japanese: 同盟王女)	May 18, 2007
Sherwood, Hime's sister, shows up one day at the mansion, proposing an alliance against their other siblings. Hime refuses, but Sherwood has something up her sleeve, having Francisca plant a dangerous man-eating plant with vines near the mansion before leaving at night. The next morning, the plant covers the entire mansion. Hime, Flandre, and Riza do their best to fend off the plant, ultimately setting the mansion in flames. Hime plants the man-eating plant near Sherwood and Francisca to get back at them, but Hiro jumps in the way to prevent Sherwood from being eaten before the plant wilts come nightfall. In the end, Hime and Sherwood agree to form an alliance.
7	"Princess Electric Shock"; Transliteration: "Dengeki Oujo" (Japanese: 電撃王女)	May 25, 2007
Hiro loses consciousness while shopping and is taken to the hospital. He wakes up there only to be chased by a mad scientist named Housei Sanagida and his minions, interested in his immortality. Hiro tries to find a way out of the hospital while his energy gradually depletes. Hime, Flandre, and Riza, who are all aware that Hiro needs restoration, go out and search for him at night. Reiri tells the three that Hiro is at the hospital. Sanagida takes Hiro to the operating room, preparing himself to dissect Hiro. Hime, Flandre, and Riza push their way past the minions to get to Sanagida and rescue Hiro. When Sanagida charges at Hime, she electrocutes him to death using a defibrillator.
8	"Princess Locked Room"; Transliteration: "Misshitsu Oujo" (Japanese: 密室王女)	June 1, 2007
As a typhoon hits the city, the roads become blocked by landslides. Hiro, Hime, Riza, and Reiri are forced to stay at a motel until the weather lets up. However, "that", a spider-like monster, haunts the motel, sucking out the life force out of two guests. Although Hime and Reiri ignore the situation by playing chess, Hiro and Riza gather the other guests and take them outside to look for "that". When they see "that" coming out of another guest, Hiro and Riza fail to capture it. In the lobby, "that" shoots out of a fourth guest and tries to possess the fifth guest. As Hiro and Riza are unable to prevent "that" from possessing the fifth guest, Hime steps in and strikes it with a broken cue stick.
9	"Princess Black & White"; Transliteration: "Shirokuro Oujo" (Japanese: 白黒王女)	June 8, 2007
During the day, Hime tells Hiro to congratulate Sherwood for her arrival at her new mansion. Upon reaching there, Hiro sees Francisca carrying a panda, which she names Ryu-ryu. Sherwood allows Ryu-ryu to work for her, seeing if he can make himself useful around the mansion, but all he does is cause more harm than good. At night, Reiri shows up at that mansion and warns them that a colony of spiderbats will soon attack them all. During the battle, Ryu-ryu takes a hit to protect Sherwood from being hurt. Soon after, Hime and Riza come to help defeat these spiderbats by sunrise. Sherwood and Francisca find out that Ryu-ryu was knocked out, not killed.
10	"Princess Reminiscence"; Transliteration: "Tsuioku Oujo" (Japanese: 追憶王女)	June 15, 2007
While she goes out shopping, Flandre meets an android named Ciel and brings him to be repaired. In return, he does various chores around the mansion. He tells Flandre that he worked as a miner three years ago, but he escaped and traveled to a shoreline, seeing the ocean and feeling free. However, Ciel finds out from Hime that his memories were programmed rather than experienced. Before his departure from the mansion, he tries to kidnap Hime, fairing well against Flandre. Sherwood and Francisca arrive, and the latter damages Ciel. He requests to have some of his parts transferred to Flandre to save her life. He returns to Zeppeli, responsible for all of the recent attacks thus far. Having a time bomb strapped to his body, Ciel detonates after confronting Zeppeli regarding his programmed memories.
11	"Princess Cat Tongue"; Transliteration: "Nekojita Oujo" (Japanese: 猫舌王女)	June 22, 2007
Hiro finds a cat lying unconscious on the side of the road and decides to take her in. Sawawa Hiyorimi, his sister, helps him take care of the cat, naming her Hiroko. After taking a short nap, Hiro wakes up to see that Hiroko is a cat person, who grows very attached to him. Hime later notices some traps being set up in the mansion, deducing someone is after her. Meanwhile, after Hiro goes out shopping, he chances upon Sherwood and company, but when they reach her mansion, Sherwood is attacked by a frog ninja, an unskilled assassin controlled by the bell on her collar, yet Francisca easily defeats him. Hiro runs back to his mansion, figuring out that Hiroko wears the same collar. Hime and company catch Hiroko red-handed at night, but Hiro is injured in the process of removing the collar from her neck. Shocked by her own behavior, Hiroko disappears the next morning.
12	"Princess Attrition"; Transliteration: "Shoumou Oujo" (Japanese: 消耗王女)	June 29, 2007
While it is raining outside, Hiro needs to pick up Hime and Flandre from the train station, but he is stopped by Sherwood and Fransisca, who force him to play in the arcade with them. As the rain lets up, he returns to the mansion, only to see that Hime comes down with a cold after walking home through the rain. Since the pharmacy is closed, he returned to the arcade, where Sherwood gives him special medicine for Hime. At night, a revived pharaoh comes to kill Hime, given the promise of eternal life. The pharaoh sends his army of mummies to attack the mansion. Due to the drowsy effects of the cold medicine, Hime entrusts her life with Hiro until morning. Sherwood and Francisca later join up with Hiro, Flandre, and Riza to hold off the mummies all night long until they become exhausted in the morning. After Hime wakes up by then, she charges at the pharaoh and slashes him with chainsaws.
13	"Princess Sacrifice"; Transliteration: "Ikenie Oujo" (Japanese: 生贄王女)	July 6, 2007
During a lunar eclipse, the car breaks down when Hiro, Hime, and Flandre were on their way home. The three head down to a desolate village, but on the way there, Hime sprains her ankle when they are briefly met by a masked serial killer in the woods. Hiro and Hime are pulled into the past memory of Akasabi Village forty years ago. They gradually see that the village chief's wife, the director of the village, an unidentified person, and the village chief's son were reported missing and then supposedly murdered by the Paperbag Man of Akasabi Village. They also see silhouettes and hear voices coming from the villagers as well. The Paperbag Man, going against a dam project supported by the villagers, later committed arson and burned down the village. As the village begins to flood, Hiro and Hime head to the woods and see the Paperbag Man once again. After Hiro restrains him, Hime stabs the Paperbag Man in the head with a pitchfork.
14	"Princess Dead Spirit"; Transliteration: "Shissou Oujo" (Japanese: 疾走王女)	July 13, 2007
A rumor is said that a ghost horseman that rides across the Sasanagi Pass would finally rest in peace if someone could beat it in a race. Riza, believing the rumor is true, rides her motorcycle at night to see it for herself, coming across a headless horseman that attacks her out of the blue. After returning to the mansion and concluding that the horseman is looking for its head, she takes Hiro with her to search for the horseman's head. During that time, Hiro is kidnapped by Sanagida and is brought to Zeppeli, who affixes the head of the horseman onto Hiro. After a possessed Hiro finds Riza, the headless horseman comes and takes hold of Hiro. As Riza chases the headless horseman on the pass, Hime shows up and knocks Hiro out of the headless horseman using a baseball bat, and Riza put the horseman's head back onto its body. Riza is finally able to make the ghost horseman rest in peace after beating it in a race.
15	"Princess Visitation"; Transliteration: "Houmon Oujo" (Japanese: 訪問王女)	July 20, 2007
Nozomi Kobuchizawa shows Yoshida and Murayama proof that Hiro has been staying with three beautiful women. They go to the mansion, each daydreaming what it would be like to be with Sawawa, Riza, and Hime. They confront him regarding how lucky he is to be under the same roof as the three girls. Since the three boys are so persistent in wanting to serve under the three girls, Hime agrees on the condition that they, along with Hiro, race through an obstacle course in the mansion filled with booby traps to get to her. Sherwood, Francisca, Reiri, Ryu-ryu, and Riza all try to stop them as well. Hiro was revealed to actually be a shapeshifter disguised in his form, so Hime freezes it to death using liquid nitrogen.
16	"Princess Succession"; Transliteration: "Keishou Oujo" (Japanese: 継承王女)	July 27, 2007
Riza, feeling unchallenged with her training, returns to the lake resort, restored by the mermen. Hiro, Hime, and Flandre accompanies her there. While cruising on a lake in a motorboat, she then races against Aron, a famous female assassin of the shark family. Riza's motorboat gets into a wreck, and Aron brings her to shore at night, while the others are highly concerned of her whereabouts. Aron happens to be good friends with Lobo Wildman, which Riza is reminded of his death by Hime. After Poseidon finds Riza and informs the other mermen about it, Riza is challenged to spar with Aron. The next morning, Riza and the others leave the lake resort and return to the mansion. However, at that night, Aron shows up at the mansion, revealing that she was sent to kill Hime. Motivated by her half-brother's death, Riza defeats Aron in battle. In her dying words, Aron asks Riza to avenge Wildman for her as well.
17	"Princess Maturation"; Transliteration: "Toshima Oujo" (Japanese: 年増王女)	August 3, 2007
A witch goes to the city park, sending the monsters under her into the shopping district to find Hime and Sherwood. Francisca trails one of the monsters after it eats up Hiro's takoyaki and destroys Sherwood's skin lotion products they each bought, but she loses track of the monster. Francisca goes to the mansion and inform this to Hime and the others, not knowing that the monster followed her there. After the monster reports to her, the witch appears at Hime's mansion, telling Hime that she seeks eternal youth. However, the witch retreats from the stench of Sawawa's homemade jiaozi. She heads to Sherwood's mansion and tries to suck Sherwood into her magical mirror, but her plan backfires when Hime and the others arrive. When she tries to suck Sherwood in a second time, the others are pulled into the mirror as well, overloading and causing it to burst. Hime allows the witch to leave without any sort of punishment.
18	"Princess Hunter"; Transliteration: "Karyuudo Oujo" (Japanese: 狩人王女)	August 10, 2007
A novice vampire hunter of the tanuki race named Shigara goes to the mansion and attacks Hime, mistakenly believing her to be a vampire. Before Hime tells him to leave, Shigara explains that he became a vampire hunter in order to feed his family. When Shigara finds Zeppeli at his home, he fails to ward off Zeppeli. After Shigara is chased outside by Sanagida, Zeppeli suggests that Shigara should hunt Reiri down instead. Although Shigara tries to concentrate on his mission, he is distracted by doing good deeds for people throughout the day. At night, Reiri attacks Zeppeli for telling Shigara where she lives. This catches Zepelli off guard, and enables Shigara to stab him in the back with a wooden stake. Shigara leaves with the joy of his long awaited accomplishment. It is later revealed that Reiri and Zeppeli staged this scenario to finally get Shigara off of their backs.
19	"Princess Ocean"; Transliteration: "Kaiyou Oujo" (Japanese: 海洋王女)	August 17, 2007
Out at sea, distress signals are sent by a mysterious ship, forcing other vessels to collide and sink. Hiro, Hime, and Riza, board this ship, later haunted with zombies. The three are saved by a werewolf named Keziah Bold. After figuring out that the distress signals are being played on a flute by a mermaid hidden somewhere on the ship, the group finally finds the mermaid Madeleine in a room, cursed for trading her voice for a human body. The ghost shark of the haunted ship used these distress signals to feed on the drowned souls. Keziah sets fire to sink the ship, while the ghost shark chases after the rest, but Hime smashes it with a chandelier, which releases all the souls. When Keziah warns the others to get off the ship, Madeleine calls out for him to save his life, sacrificing her own. However, Emile, Keziah's master and one of Hime's older brothers, shows up and revives Madeleine before the three of them leave the ship.
20	"Princess Connection"; Transliteration: "Renketsu Oujo" (Japanese: 連結王女)	August 24, 2007
After Hiro visits Sherwood, Riza finds him on the road to the mansion. All of a sudden, a vampire named Duke Dracul soon defeats Riza and kidnaps Hiro. Hime orders Riza and Reiri to go and fetch Hiro from the Dracul's castle. Making it to the vampire village, Riza allows Reiri to suck her blood to become a temporary vampire. When the two approach the castle, they are attacked by a cyclops guard. They manage to push it off of the tower into the moat. Hime and Flandre arrive with the mermen and cause Dracul to retreat. Riza and Reiri then save Hiro.
21	"Princess Banishment"; Transliteration: "Tsuihou Oujo" (Japanese: 追放王女)	August 31, 2007
Reiri has been absent from school for the past three days. Hiro finds out from Kobuchizawa that she lives at an empty church. When the two reach there, they see that Reiri is being banished from the vampire village. Dracul sends in a group of vampire in the lower class. While Hiro stays behind to help Reiri fight off the vampires, Kobuchizawa goes to the mansion to ask Hime and Flandre for backup, though Riza is hesitant at first. Hime, Flandre, Sherwood, Francisca, and Ryu-ryu come to assist Hiro and Reiri in defeating the vampires. Riza, finally deciding to join the rest, teams up with Hime and Reiri to take Dracul down. Reiri pierces his chest with a wooden stake, Riza knocks him out, and Hime stabs him. He still manages to return to the castle, but Emile kills him instead of reviving him. Since the church was burned down during the battle, Reiri moves into the mansion.
22	"Princess Carnage"; Transliteration: "Satsuriku Oujo" (Japanese: 殺戮王女)	September 7, 2007
Riza is approached by three werewolves (Alex, Karim, and Sarome), all of whom are immortal and have come to kill Hime. Riza goes after Alex outside, but she becomes wounded before defeating him. Hiro, Hime, and Flandre deal with Karim and Sarome inside, and Reiri comes to help the three. Flandre throws the three werewolves into the cellar, and Hime later repeatedly shoots them using a revolver. Reiri reminds Hiro that he is just a warrior sworn to protect Hime at her disposal. He questions to himself whether or not Hime sees him as a warrior or companion.
23	"Princess Zombie"; Transliteration: "Shiryou Oujo" (Japanese: 死霊王女)	September 14, 2007
Hiro, Hime, Flandre, Riza, and Reiri are trying to find the royal sibling responsible for sending Dracul and the three werewolves, ending up at a town. In an abandoned warehouse, Riza and Reiri are distracted when a female warrior named Micasa fights them both. The town is then populated with zombies, and they have no idea who caused this. To make matters worse, Flandre powers down while the group tries to hold back the zombies till morning. Micasa, who briefly reports to her master Severin, another one of Hime's older brothers, returns to fight Riza. After Flandre is recharged, Sherwood, Francisca, and Ryu-ryu arrive to help the group take out the zombies, while Riza manages to defeat Micasa.
24 (End)	"Princess Duel"; Transliteration: "Kettou Oujo" (Japanese: 決闘王女)	September 21, 2007
A phoenix appears in the sky, which means the royal family has arrived. The imperial guard committee appear in front of the mansion, accusing Hime of deploying an army of zombies. Hime is taken to the royal family court standing before the judge, and it is revealed that Severin was behind this. Granted by suggestion, Hime and Severin propose a duel to determine the verdict. Although Hime loses her sword onto the ground, she manages to pick it up, but she chooses to discard it. Severin is frightened by this and unleashes a gun from his hand, but Hime discharges the gun and stabs Severin with his own sword. The judge calls his ruling and departs on the phoenix.
25 (Extra Episode)	"Princess Delinquent"; Transliteration: "Furyou Oujo" (Japanese: 不良王女)	September 28, 2007
Flandre acts strangely and goes on a rampage, repeatedly attacking Hiro. Hime catches attention of this and contacts Sherwood about it. While the two analyze Flandre's data in the laboratory, Hiro and Riza try to follow Flandre from the pass to the shopping district. Although it is a wild goose chase for them, she is thought to have saved many people in the city. Finally catching up to them at a power plant, Hime tells Hiro and Riza that Flandre will self-destruct soon, and Sherwood sends Francisca to battle Flandre, but to no use. Flandre heads into the ocean, but as it seems that she has self-destructed, Emile briefly appears with his android Flanders and tightens the loose screw on Flandre's head, being the reason for her misbehavior.
26 (Extra Episode)	"Princess Comatose"; Transliteration: "Konsui Oujo" (Japanese: 昏睡王女)	DVD only release
Flandre has gone missing inside the mansion. Reiri, Riza, Hiro, and Hime each realize their powers do not work somehow. Hime deduces that the four of them are trapped in a same nightmare, after proving to them that setting a curtain on fire was just an illusion. Flandre, who is not in the nightmare thereby unaffected, tries to find a way to wake them up. The four of them encounter many enemies they faced in the past, but they remind themselves that the enemies are imaginary. Hime figures out that they are inside Hiro's dream. Flandre contact Sherwood, Francisca, and Ryu-ryu for help. Flandre and Francisca scan the area, while Sherwood and Ryu-ryu enter the nightmare, since there is some sort of energy causing them to sleep. Sherwood finds the creature responsible and Hime slashes it, thus ending the nightmare.

== OVA trilogy ==
Although not televised, three subsequent anime OVAs were released from 9 December 2010 to 7 October 2011 with the 13th, 14th and 16th volumes of the manga compilations.

=== Commentary ===
Every episode got the word "princess".

== See also ==
List of Princess Resurrection characters
