= List of Ace of Diamond characters =

The following is a list of characters that appear in the baseball manga series, Ace of Diamond.

== Seidou High School ==
=== Eijun Sawamura ===
Position: Pitcher
Voiced by: Ryōta Ōsaka
Eijun Sawamura (沢村 栄純, Sawamura Eijun) is the main protagonist of the series. Eijun is a left-handed pitcher who has extremely erratic throwing motions. His body is naturally flexible with supple joints, allowing him to immediately change the pitch's direction. Because Eijun has been playing baseball without proper instruction, his pitches normally change direction right before the batter hits the ball. However, this makes catching the ball difficult, as most catchers cannot predict where the ball will end up. He was initially unaware of this quirk in his throws. His knowledge about baseball is mediocre at best, but he strives to improve his skills and become the ace player of Seidou.
Eijun comes from Nagano where he played baseball in his middle school. His team was below average, often making mistakes during critical moments and losing almost all matches. However, Eijun has an extremely strong spirit which, no matter how hopeless the situation got, inspired his teammates to continue playing their best. His childhood friend, Wakana, was the baseball team manager. Initially, after Eijun had been scouted by Seidou, he had planned to refuse because he wanted to keep playing with his friends in the same high school. However, his friends encouraged Eijun to go to Seidou despite their reluctant feelings because they felt as if they were holding Eijun back. Eijun eventually goes to Seidou and boldly declares that he will become the team's ace.
Eijun's strong points are his infallible spirit, bunting, infield defense, and his idiosyncratic pitches. His weaknesses are control, outfield defense, and batting. He later had overcome many of them, becoming particularly skilled at slash bunts and pick-offs. He has a hotheaded and loudmouthed personality, often causing his teammates exasperation because of his stupidity, yet it also rallies them during games at the same time. He maintains a friendship and rivalry with Furuya, a fellow first-year pitcher. Because his middle school team was so weak, he is extremely level-headed in critical times.
The main balls he throws are called the "numbers". It involves combining Eijun's unique throwing posture and improving ball control with various styles of hand grips and throwing methods, each style being given a number, hence the name. Eijun and Miyuki developed this ability through accidental discovery after Ochiai tried to teach him how to throw a change-up.

=== Satoru Furuya ===
Position: Pitcher, Left Fielder
Voiced by: Nobunaga Shimazaki
Satoru Furuya (降谷 暁, Furuya Satoru) is Eijun's rival, Furuya is a talented right-handed pitcher with extremely strong fastballs and forkballs. His pitches are so strong that no catcher in Hokkaido was able to receive them. As a result, he became alienated from his middle-school team because he was far above them in ability. After hearing about the genius catcher, Miyuki Kazuya, he applied to go to Seidou high school to play baseball with him, and immediately earned his respect when Miyuki easily caught his pitch. During the game of first years versus second years, Furuya jumped from the second team to the first team after only one pitch. After playing his first official game against Yokohama, Furuya gained prominence within the high school baseball world and is described as a monster rookie. After the third years retired, Furuya becomes the ace of Seidou. However, as the story progress, the flaws in his playing style became more and more obvious. He later loses the position of ace player.
Furuya's strong points are his incredible pitching, outfield defense, and batting. Being from Hokkaido, he was initially unused to the summer heat in Tokyo which drains his stamina quickly but he has since become accustomed to Tokyo's weather. However, his real weakness is his tendency to overcompensate when under pressure which affects him both physically and mentally; it was this weakness that ultimate costs him the ace position as Coach Kataoka realize the burden of being the ace was not allowing Furuya to overcome his problem. This decision ultimately paid off as Furuya began to regain his footing not long after and reclaim his reputation as a monster rookie.
Personality wise, Furuya is stoic and unsociable with a cool demeanor and often has an expressionless face, but his aura completely changes while pitching. He dislikes all other aspects of baseball besides pitching despite his talents. However, he is also humble despite his personality, once mentioning that he never thought himself better than Eijun. He respects Eijun to a certain point and often accompanies the latter to do extra practice at night. Because he was an outcast in his middle school, he is happy about but unused to the Seidou upperclassmen's friendly but bossy treatment towards him, being content when he was ordered to fetch them drinks and uncomfortable when they excessively praise him. He also likes taking advice. He gets bored easily, disliking it when he cannot play in a match, and often falls asleep when he is not playing, or when he wants to ignore somebody.

=== Kazuya Miyuki ===
Position: Catcher
Voiced by: Takahiro Sakurai
Kazuya Miyuki (御幸 一也, Miyuki Kazuya) is a brilliant second-year catcher with an easygoing yet twisted personality to draw out the full potential from the pitchers. He is the main catcher in Seidou High School, making smart and bold gameplays. When he was young, he was extremely blunt with his words, which makes him being harassed and beaten up by his baseball teammates in his junior high, resulting in him pushing others away from his personal life. It is also shown that he is not very much close to his parents. Miyuki has a great respect for Chris as a catcher, as he was on the team that Miyuki couldn't beat. After the third years retired, Miyuki was voted as the new captain.
Apart from being emotionally closed off from everyone else, Miyuki is perceived as having a manipulative and nasty personality. However, he is very knowledgeable and does care for the well-being of his teammates, especially for Eijun and Furuya, and he is also well-liked by his team. He is one of the few players whose room is often flocked to by other members. He is also shown to be highly resilient despite his appearance, keeping quiet about the injury he suffered during the semi-final game against Seiko in the Fall Tournament so he could still play in the finals. Once this was discovered, however, he was not allowed to play at the Jingu tournament given the doctor's advice of three-week recovery period, during which all he did was to look after the team and specifically comment on the sense of unity of the pitchers which he finds sickeningly well to his taste. He came back completely recovered to the team for the Winter camp. Later on, Miyuki helped developed Eijun's "numbers" after they both accidentally discovered a way to exploit Eijun's unique throwing style while the latter was being taught how to throw a change-up.

=== Haruichi Kominato ===
Position: Second Baseman
Voiced by: Natsuki Hanae
Haruichi Kominato (小湊 春市, Kominato Haruichi) is a first-year second baseman of the team, Haruichi is a naturally talented, all-rounder baseball player. Despite his small stature and frail appearance, he has pinpoint precision while batting the ball, able to hit it as wide and as far as he pleases, and control where the ball lands. He also is extremely talented at defense, able to catch a ball in the air and throw it while still floating. He is often noted to have amazing baseball sense, able to decide in a split second where to hit the ball, what to watch for, and when to steal. His ability in baseball exceeds his older brother Ryousuke Kominato, who is first-string player and also a second baseman. The only thing lacking is his stamina, which he works hard on improving.
Born in the Kanagawa Prefecture, Haruichi is a very calm and quiet person, often acting as tsukkomi to Eijun's boke. When he was a child, he and Ryousuke were much closer as the older brother often protect his younger brother from bullies. Haruichi has a habit of saying things bluntly and often praises either Furuya or Eijun, causing them to compete against each other frequently. He plays reserve in the first-string team and occasionally feels envious of Eijun and Furuya for being able to play in a match. He was very small compared to the other boys, and it was noted that he looks a bit like a girl. He is easily embarrassed, especially when praised. His relationship with Ryousuke is slightly strained because they play the same position, but he still endlessly admires his older brother. Though reserved, he is highly ambitious and aims to take his brother's position. As the story progress, Haruichi begins to display some of Ryousuke's more negative traits, but other than that, remains more or less of himself.

=== Yoichi Kuramochi ===
Position: Shortstop
Voiced by: Shintarō Asanuma
Yoichi Kuramochi (倉持 洋一, Kuramochi Yōichi) is Eijun's roommate, who is best known for his laugh. Kuramochi enjoys replying Wakana's text and wrestling Eijun whenever they fool around. He is a shortstop who, together with Ryousuke Kominato, forms a strong pair of middle infielders. He is assigned as the first batter due to his ability to run quickly. He likes to play video games during his free time. In contrast to his mischievous personality, Kuramochi is shown to be able to read and understand others well, being one of the few people with the closest understanding of Miyuki's personality despite the catcher's cheeky attitude. After the third years retired, Kuramochi became one of the team's vice-captains alongside Maezono.

=== Current first years ===
Koushuu Okumura (奥村 光舟, Okumura Kōshū)
Position: Catcher
Voiced by: Yūma Uchida
A highly-skilled catcher who decided to join Seidou after being impressed by their pitchers. Due to the actions of his former coach back in junior high, he has lost any passion of playing baseball and developed a cold attitude as a result; watching Seidou's game caused him to try and see if he could enjoy baseball once again. Okumura immediately marked Miyuki as a rival to surpass after becoming roommates with him, and is rather blunt with his words.
Okumura's relationship with Eijun started off bad, with Okumura initiating an argument with Eijun due to finding him annoying during their first interaction. Ironically, Eijun's pitching was one of the reasons why Okumura had joined Seidou team. Miyuki later resolved their differences by getting Okumura catch Eijun's throws, with Okumura shocked by the power and unpredictability of Eijun's pitches. He then promises not to catch for Eijun until he makes it to the first-string team, a promise he kept once he was promoted, forming a new battery with Eijun during one of Seidou's most crucial practice games while Miyuki was not around, proving himself to be just as a good catcher like Miyuki.
Takuma Seto (瀬戸 拓馬, Seto Takuma)
Position: Second Baseman
Voiced by: Daiki Yamashita
Koushuu's friend, who also decided to join Seidou. Always seen with a cocky smile on his face, Takuma is noted for his running speed and is currently in the second-string team.
Masashi Yuki (結城 将司, Yūki Masashi)
Position: Left Fielder
Voiced by: Shunsuke Takeuchi
The younger brother of Tetsuya Yuki who decided to join Seidou. Like his brother, Masashi is noted for his powerful hits that almost always ends in a home run. However, he has low accuracy, usually missing half of his swings. He and Yui were the first of their batch to be promoted into the first-string team.
Kaoru Yui (由井 薫, Yui Kaoru)
Position: Catcher
Voiced by: Ayumu Murase
A first-year student who joined Seidou, Yui is considered a baseball prodigy due to his skills but is also discriminated because of his short size. He sometimes helps to catch for Eijun, expressing interest in his "numbers". He and Masashi were the first of their batch to be promoted into the first-string team.
Hirofumi Asada (浅田 浩文, Asada Hirofumi)
Position: Pitcher
Voiced by: Tasuku Hatanaka
A soft-spoken and timid first year who is currently roommates with Eijun and Kuramochi, Asada is noted for his unique curveball.
Yohei Kuki (九鬼 洋平, Kuki Yōhei)
Position: Pitcher
Voiced by: Takaaki Torishima
Kanemaru and Tojo's friend and former junior high classmate, who is currently in the second-string team.
Kota Kagami (加賀美 貢太, Kagami Kōta)
Position: Right Fielder
One of the players currently in the second-string team, noted for being inconspicuous but definitely has the ability.
Takeshi Mogami (最上 武, Mogami Takeshi)
Position: Shortstop
Voiced by: Yūya Hirose
A first-year student who thinks very highly of himself but shows lack of skills.

=== Sawamura's year (Current second years) ===
Shinji Kanemaru (金丸 信二, Kanemaru Shinji)
Position: Third Baseman
Voiced by: Yoshitsugu Matsuoka
Kanemaru is Sawamura's classmate who gets along well with Tojo. He initially looked down on Eijun, but gets eventually impressed by Eijun's abilities and becomes one of his supporters, though he does get irritated with Eijun's stupidity from time to time. Kanemaru was tasked by Chris to watch over Eijun, Furuya and Haruichi. He eventually broke through the first-string team during fall of his first year, competing with Higasa for the starting third baseman position.
Hideaki Tōjō (東条 秀明, Tōjō Hideaki)
Position: Center Fielder, Pitcher
Voiced by: Shō Sudō→Shouta Aoi
Kanemaru's good friend, Tojo was a former nationwide top 4 pitcher during his middle school days. However, stellar performances from pitchers Eijun and Furuya, combined with a miscalculation about the strength of a national-level baseball team, resulted in Tojo failing to get the role of a pitcher, much less break into the first-string team. He eventually improved himself enough to enter the first-string team as a center fielder, but has not given up on the mound. Later on, Tojo finally gets his chance to pitch during one of the practice games.
Tadahiro Kaneda (金田 忠大, Kaneda Tadahiro)
Position: Pitcher, Fielder
Voiced by: Kenichi Yumoto→Yūto Suzuki→Wataru Endō
Kaneda was originally part of the second-string team who made it into the first-string team during his second year.
Wataru Kariba (狩場 航, Kariba Wataru)
Position: Catcher
Voiced by: Kengo Kawanishi→Junta Terashima
Wataru is a catcher who is often asked to train with Eijun during their first year.
Hirōmi Takatsu (高津 広臣, Takatsu Hirōmi)
Position: Shortstop
Voiced by: Wataru Urata
Takatsu is a player on the second team who has a poor attitude brought on by his competitive nature, although he does get along with his fellow second-string players and, surprisingly, Sawamura as well. He failed to make it to first-string due to physical issues, but has bulked up and improved himself as a player since then. Despite showing the most potential, however, he narrowly missed making it into the first string.

=== Miyuki's generation (Current third years) ===
Kenta Maezono (前園 健太, Maezono Kenta)
Position: First Baseman
Voiced by: Hiroaki Tajiri
One of the larger players on the team and a pull-hitter. Nicknamed "Zono" by his teammates, he was originally a member of the second-string team until his promotion to the first-string team as one of the two vice-captains. Vocal about his thoughts, Maezono is rather kind despite his appearance. He is roommates with Haruichi. When batting, his expression becomes so scary that opposing pitchers misjudge their throws or how far his hits go due to being intimidated.
Norifumi Kawakami (川上 憲史, Kawakami Norifumi)
Position: Pitcher
Voiced by: Hiro Shimono
A relief pitcher who usually plays towards the end of the game, Kawakami is a sidearm pitcher. He is known for pitching sliders disguised as sinkers, but rarely throws actual sinkers due to a high chance for opponents to hit a home run on them. He is noted to have the best control among the pitchers of Seidou, but because of his low-key personality, he does not appear as confident as his junior pitchers.
Takeru Asou (麻生 尊, Asō Takeru)
Position: Left Fielder
Voiced by: Taishi Murata
An unremarkable player who started off as a second-string player who overestimates his own abilities and complains when people deny his attention. By his third year, however, he undergoes a personality change, realizing he needs to back up his claims, and began working harder than usual, eventually making it into the first-string as a starter, though he still likes to complain sometimes. He possesses quick reactions and strong arms that allow him to immediately scoop up balls from the ground and throw them back into the infield at high speed, preventing runners from taking extra bases.
Kenjiro Shirasu (白州 健二郎, Shirasu Kenjirō)
Position: Right Fielder
Voiced by: Yoshiyuki Shimozuma
Kawakami's good friend, who is described as Seidou's most balanced batter. He is skilled at seeing through opponent batters' characteristics and will adjust his position in defense accordingly. This, combined with his quiet nature, cause some players to refer to him as Seidou's "assassin".
Shoji Higasa (樋笠 昭二, Higasa Shōji)
Position: Third Baseman
Voiced by: Shō Kawaguchi→Junta Terashima
Rei Kijima (木島 澪, Kijima Rei)
Position: Second Baseman, First Base Coach
Voiced by: Eiji Takeuchi →Ryū Kiyama
Hisashi Watanabe (渡辺 久志, Watanabe Hisashi)
Voiced by: Akira Ishida

=== Yuki's generation (2 years above Sawamura) ===
Tetsuya Yuki (結城 哲也, Yūki Tetsuya)
Position: First Baseman
Voiced by: Yoshimasa Hosoya
Tetsuya was unanimously voted by his teammate to be the captain of the Seidou baseball team. His motto is to 'lead by performances' as suggested by the coach. Tetsuya is the cleanup batter of the team who is known for his powerful swings and home runs. Although he is a rather quiet, stoic person, his strength seems to radiate when he is in the batter box. When he first entered Seidou, his generation was considered as the weakest batch by the seniors. However, he trains hard and is able to inspire other teammates. He plays shogi (chess) during his free time, although Miyuki says he is still weak at it. Tetsuya has a younger brother, Masashi, who also joins the baseball team.
Jun Isashiki (伊佐敷 純, Isashiki Jun)
Position: Center Fielder
Voiced by: Yūki Ono
Isashiki is a loud-mouthed person with a strong attitude. He was the team's vice-captain. He wanted to be a pitcher when he first entered Seidou, but was suggested to be a center fielder instead due to his strong shoulder but inability to throw a strike. Isashiki can throw a ball from the outfield to the home plate without bouncing the ball. He is also a strong batter who usually hits the ball to the right, although he admits he cannot hit better than Tetsuya.
Toru Masuko (増子 透, Masuko Tōru)
Position: Third Baseman
Voiced by: Wataru Hatano
Masuko is Eijun and Kuramochi's roommate who likes to eat pudding. A larger player of the team, he is able to hit a home run of Eijun's moving fastball by forcing his strength through his batting. He was demoted to the second-string team once due to the error he made during a game.
Ryousuke Kominato (小湊 亮介, Kominato Ryōsuke)
Position: Second Baseman
Voiced by: Nobuhiko Okamoto
Ryousuke is Haruichi's older brother.
Kōichirō Tanba (丹波 光一郎, Tanba Kōichirō)
Position: Pitcher
Voiced by: Masakazu Morita
Tanba is the ace player of the Seidou baseball team when Eijun first entered the school. His strength is the curve ball and the forkball.
Chris Yu Takigawa (滝川・クリス・優, Takigawa Kurisu Yū)
Position: Catcher
Voiced by: Daisuke Namikawa
Chris is the former catcher of the Seidou baseball team before he injured his shoulder from overworking. He was paired with Sawamura in the beginning in order to bring out his potential. He is eventually asked by the coach to become the scorekeeper of the team.
Keisuke Miyauchi (宮内 啓介, Miyauchi Keisuke)
Position: Catcher
Voiced by: Taishi Murata
Ichiro Sakai (坂井 一郎, Sakai Ichirō)
Position: Left Fielder
Voiced by: Eiji Takeuchi

=== Staff ===
Tesshin Kataoka (片岡 鉄心, Kataoka Tesshin)
Voiced by: Hiroki Tōchi
Kataoka is the strict, wise head coach of the Seidou High School Baseball Team. A former Japanese professional pitcher, he rejected the offer from a professional baseball team in order to become the coach of his alma mater. He is often called "boss" or "shogun" by Eijun.
After Seidou lost to Inashiro in the last round of Koshien qualifying tournament, Kataoka hands in his resignation despite the school principal's desire for him to stay on. At the same time, he requests the Seidou school board to let him remain as the coach for the current year, as his resignation may affect the morale of the baseball team and will also cause the new coach difficulties in training the team in the middle of the year.
Rei Takashima (高島 礼, Takashima Rei)
Voiced by: Yumi Uchiyama
Rei is the scout and assistant director of Seidou High School Baseball Team. She scouted Eijun Sawamura after seeing his performance in his final game during middle school. She believes that Eijun has the potential to become the ace of the team. Aside from Eijun, Rei is also responsible for recruiting Miyuki, Kuramochi and Chris into joining Seidou.
Kazuyoshi Oota (太田 一義, Ōta Kazuyoshi)
Voiced by: Eiji Takeuchi
Oota is the mentor and club president of Seidou baseball team. He appears to be supportive of Kawakami.
Hiromitsu Ochiai (落合 博光, Ochiai Hiromitsu)
Voiced by: Tōru Ōkawa
Ochiai is the new assistant coach of Seidou baseball team. He was recruited by the school after Kataoka hands his resignation and would become the head coach of Seidou after the end of the school year. He has a sneaky, calculating personality and has a radical, straightforward way to lead a team. Because he always supports Furuya as being a superior pitcher and the true ace of Seidou, Ochiai initially believes that Eijun is a "useless pitcher," but has since started to begrudgingly acknowledge his skills.
Haruno Yoshikawa (吉川 春乃, Yoshikawa Haruno)
Voiced by: Yurika Endō (seasons 1–2), Ayane Sakura (Act II)
One of the managers of Seidou baseball team, and currently a classmate of Eijun, Furuya and Kanemaru. Haruno is a clumsy girl who has a crush on Eijun.
Takako Fujiwara (藤原 貴子, Fujiwara Takako)
Voiced by: Rikako Yamaguchi
One of the managers of Seidou baseball team.
Sachiko Umemoto (梅本 幸子, Umemoto Sachiko)
Voiced by: Yumiri Hanamori
One of the managers of Seidou baseball team.
Yui Natsukawa (夏川 唯, Natsukawa Yui)
Voiced by: Karin Takahashi
One of the managers of Seidou baseball team.

== Recurring characters ==
=== Wakana Aotsuki ===
Voiced by: Kaji Ayano
Wakana Aotsuki (蒼月 若菜, Aotsuki Wakana) is Eijun's childhood friend and former teammate during middle school; she was the right fielder for Eijun's former baseball team during middle school.
The members of Seidou think Wakana is Sawamura's girlfriend and are jealous of him, especially Kuramochi after seeing Wakana for the first time, tormenting him whenever he gets a text from her. Kuramochi likes to reply to Wakana's messages for Eijun since the two boys are roommates. It is hinted that Wakana has a crush on Eijun throughout the story. She texted him that she wished she could "see his growth from up close". Eijun did not understand what she meant and replied that she should not say such scary stuff like she is some kind of creepy guardian spirit.

=== Inashiro Industries ===
Mei Narumiya (成宮 鳴, Narumiya Mei)
Voiced by: Yūki Kaji
The famous ace player of the Inashiro Industrial Baseball Team. Narumiya is considered to be the best pitcher in Kanto due to his ability to throw strong fastballs, horizontal and vertical breaking balls, as well as the changeup. During middle school, he was Miyuki's former teammate. Narumiya joined Inashiro along with the other strong baseball players in order to form the best team in his generation, but Miyuki rejected his offer and went to Seidou instead.
During the Koshien championship, Narumiya is nicknamed "The Prince of the Capital" by the mass media for his exemplary performance. However, during the Fall Tournament, his arrogance and belief that he should shoulder all the responsibilities of leading the team as its ace resulted in an upset defeat to Ugumori, forcing him to realize he needed to trust his teammates. He had since recovered from the loss and improved his skills greatly.
Katsuyuki Shirakawa (白河 勝之, Shirakawa Katsuyuki)
Voiced by: Sōichirō Hoshi
Carlos Toshiki Kamiya (神谷 カルロス 俊樹, Kamiya Karurosu Toshiki)
Voiced by: KENN
Riku Yamaoka (山岡 陸, Yamaoka Riku)
Voiced by: Shō Kawaguchi
Itsuki Tadano (多田野 樹, Tadano Itsuki)
Voiced by: Yoshitaka Yamaya
Hiroshige Kunitomo (国友 広重, Kunitomo Hiroshige)
Voiced by: Yutaka Nakano
The head coach of the Inashiro Industrial Baseball Team.
Shinji Akamatsu (赤松 晋二, Akamatsu Shinji)
Voiced by: Tsubasa Yonaga
A pitcher who decided to join Inashiro.

==== Former ====
Masatoshi Harada (原田 雅功, Harada Masatoshi)
Voiced by: Tomoaki Maeno
The captain of Inashiro Industrial Baseball Team, Harada is Narumiya's closest teammate and baseball catcher.
Hideaki Yoshizawa (吉沢 秀明, Yoshizawa Hideaki)
Voiced by: Tetsuya Kakihara
Tsubasa Hirai (平井 翼, Hirai Tsubasa)
Voiced by: Daisuke Hirakawa

=== Yakushi High School ===
Raichi Todoroki (轟 雷市, Todoroki Raichi)
Voiced by: Kenshō Ono
Known as the "Monster Slugger" due to his immensely powerful batting, Raichi is on the main batting lineup for the Yakushi High School Baseball Team. His father, the team's coach, used to have him practice his swing everyday to earn money in the future, so he is able to hit many different types of balls with a perfect swing. His father encourages him to bat well with the promise of food, such as tonkatsu. This usually leads to comical fights between father and son as Raichi would often bring up his father's debts in response. His bat is named Money Tree. He is a rather quiet student in school but he is the loudest player on the team. He is known for his unique "kahahaha" laugh, whenever he is excited particularly about facing challenging opponents.
Shunpei Sanada (真田 俊平, Sanada Shunpei)
Voiced by: Hiroshi Kamiya
The ace player of the Yakushi High School Baseball Team.
Yūta Mishima (三島 優太, Mishima Yūta)
Voiced by: Tatsuhisa Suzuki
Kazuma Akiba (秋葉 一真, Akiba Kazuma)
Voiced by: Ryōsuke Kanemoto
Raizō Todoroki (轟 雷蔵, Todoroki Raizō)
Voiced by: Rintarō Nishi
The head coach of the Yakushi High School Baseball Team and Raichi's father. He needs money to repay his debts so he became the coach and trained his son to play, in order to make money as a professional.

=== Ichidaisan High ===
Kōsei Amahisa (天久 光聖, Amahisa Kōsei)
Voiced by: Ryōhei Kimura
The ace player of the Ichidai High School Baseball Team. Amahisa is one of the few pitchers who have known to struck out Raichi, along with Sawamura and Tanba. He utilizes sliders and fastballs. Amahisa once left the team because he felt bored after a loss, but upon learning that Manaka was injured, he immediately returned to the team and worked extra hard to regain his teammates' trust. Due to his poor social awareness, he often unintentionally provokes others and had to be explained to why his choice of words are rude. He was particularly impressed with Eijun's pitching, leading to the two swapping contacts on their cellphones after their match despite Eijun's reluctance.
Toshihiko Tahara (田原 利彦, Tahara Toshihiko)
Voiced by: Akio Katō

==== Former ====
Kaname Manaka (真中 要, Manaka Kaname)
Voiced by: Kōsuke Toriumi
The former ace of Ichidai High School Baseball Team, Manaka grew up together with Tanba playing baseball. Although they separated ways since Tanba wanted to change himself and does not want to walk in Manaka's shadow, they both remained as good friends and promised to fight it out later as aces in Koshien.
Takahiro Ōmae (大前 隆広, Ōmae Takahiro)
Voiced by: Kōki Uchiyama

=== Akikawa Academy ===
Shun-chen Yang (楊 舜臣(ヤン シュンチェン), Yan Shunchen)
Voiced by: Kaito Ishikawa
A high school student of Akikawa Academy, who is an exchange student from Taiwan. He is a pitcher of the Akikawa Academy Baseball Team. He came to Tokyo because of a language exchange program, but he quickly became fascinated with Japanese baseball. He was nicknamed "Clockwork" because of his incredible and precise control.

=== Kokudoukan High School ===
Naoyuki Zaizen (財前 直行, Zaizen Naoyuki)
Voiced by: Takuma Terashima

=== Sakurazawa High School ===
Nagao Akira (長緒 アキラ, Akira Nagao)
Voiced by: Takashi Kondō

=== Sensen Academy ===
Yousuke Maki (真木洋介, Maki Yōsuke)
Voiced by: Takuya Eguchi

=== Teito High School ===
Taiyou Mukai (向井 太陽, Mukai Taiyō)
Voiced by: Soma Saito
Kengo Inui (乾憲剛, Inui Kengo)
Voiced by: Tomokazu Sugita

=== Ugumori High School ===
Seiichi Umemiya (梅宮 聖一, Umemiya Seiichi)
Voiced by: Showtaro Morikubo
Nao Matsubara (松原 南朋, Matsubara Nao)
Voiced by: Kenichi Suzumura

=== Ouya High School ===
Gou Wakabayashi (若林豪, Wakabayashi Gō)
Voiced by: Toshiki Masuda

=== Seiko Academy ===
Tsunematsu Ogawa (小川 常松, Ogawa Tsunematsu)
Voiced by: Subaru Kimura
Shinichirou Masu (枡 伸一郎, Masu Shinichirō)
Voiced by: Jun Fukuyama

== Other characters ==
Eitoku Sawamura (沢村 栄徳, Sawamura Eitoku)
Voiced by: Mitsuo Senda
Eijun's grandfather.
Kiyokuni Azuma (東 清国, Azuma Kiyokuni)
Voiced by: Nobuyuki Hiyama
J. Animal M. (J・アニマル・M, J Animaru M)
Voiced by: Hidenari Ugaki
A retired professional baseball player and the father of Chris Yu Takigawa. He helps his son with rehabilitation and plans on letting him play pro once his shoulder is fully healed.
