= Hiroki Tōchi =

Japanese actor and narrator (born 1966)

- 東地 宏樹
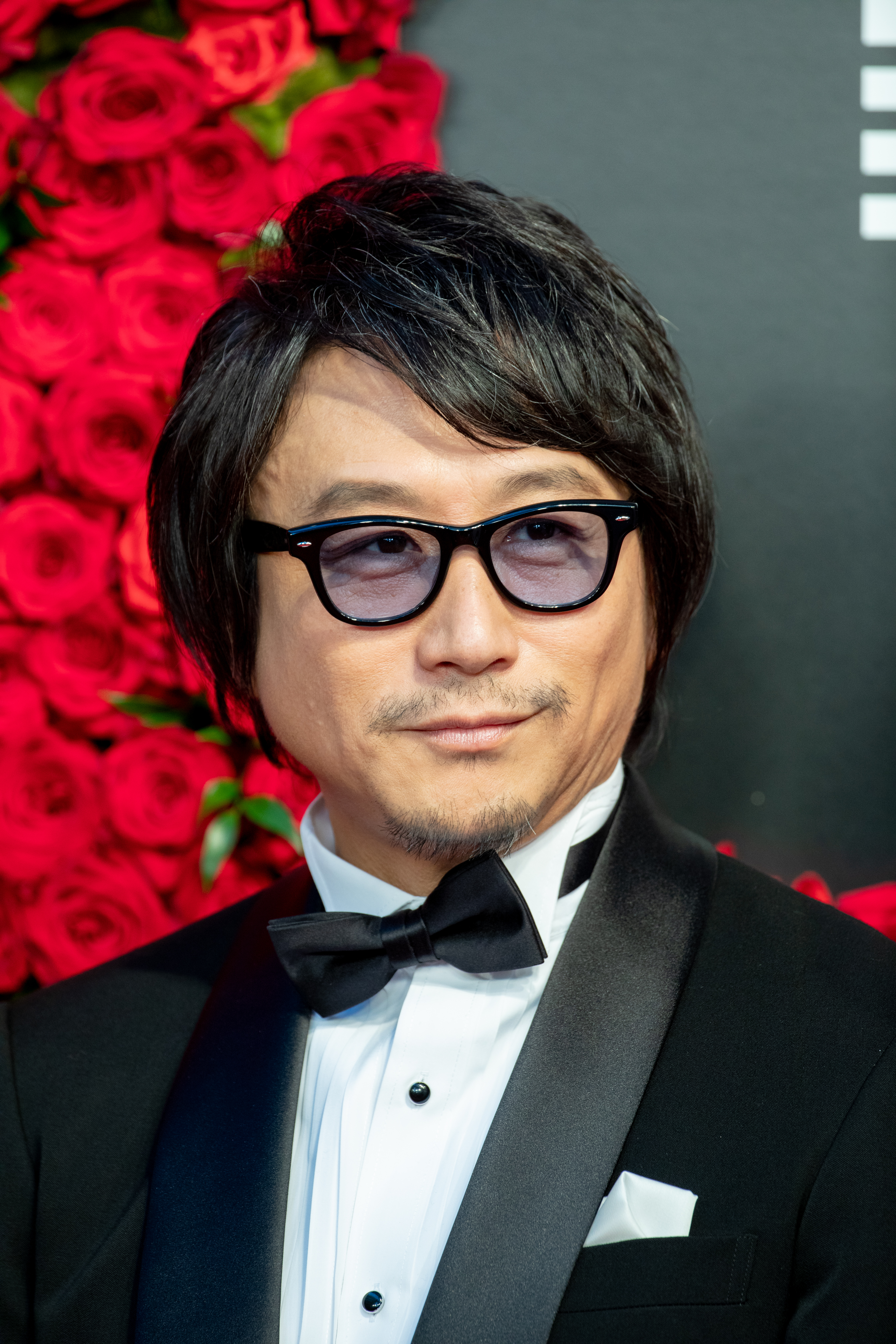
- Tōchi at the Opening Ceremony of the Tokyo International Film Festival 2018
- Born: May 26, 1966 (age 60); Tokyo, Japan
- Occupations: Actor; voice actor; narrator
- Agent: Office Osawa

Hiroki Tōchi (東地 宏樹, Tōchi Hiroki; born May 26, 1966 in Tokyo) is a Japanese actor, voice actor and narrator affiliated with Office Osawa. He has frequently appeared in many anime and video games mainly created by tri-Ace. He won a Male Character Voice Prize in the 2011 Famitsu Awards. Some of his major characters include Abel Nightroad in Trinity Blood, Baldroy in Black Butler, Kokopelli in Bokurano, Tesshin Kataoka in Ace of Diamond, Cross Marian in D.Gray-man, Panther Lily in Fairy Tail, Kugo Ginjo in Bleach, Lasse Aeon in Mobile Suit Gundam 00 and Takumi Kusaka in Zipang. In anime film series, he voices Daisuke Akimi in The Garden of Sinners and Dr. Easter in Mardock Scramble. In live-action shows, he provides the Japanese voice for Dean Winchester in Supernatural and its animated adaptation. In video games, he voices the Japanese dub voice for Nathan Drake in Uncharted series, Chris Redfield in Resident Evil and Project X Zone, Aluze in Valkyrie Profile and Desmond Miles in Assassin's Creed. He has alone done Japanese dubbing roles for Wentworth Miller, Sam Worthington, Liev Schreiber, and Will Smith.

== Filmography ==
=== Anime ===
List of voice performances in anime
Year	Title	Role	Notes	Source
1999	Turn A Gundam	Taruka		
2000	Hunter × Hunter	Ging Freecss	1st TV series	
2002	Naruto	Nan		
2003	Scrapped Princess	Luke Sturm		
2004	Zipang	Takumi Kusaka		
2004	Yakitate!! Japan	Ken Matsushiro, Announcer		
2005	Glass Mask	Ichiren Osaki		
2005	Trinity Blood	Abel Nightroad		
2005	Ginga Legend Weed	Gin		
2005	Major	Kitagawa	2nd season	
2005–06	Tsubasa: Reservoir Chronicle series	Seishirō		
2006	.hack//Roots	Ovan		
2006	Pumpkin Scissors	Deputy		
2006	D.Gray-man	Cross Marian		
2007	Nodame Cantabile	Yukihisa Matsuda		
2007	Getsumento Heiki Mina	Daisuke Kiryuu, Takuro Tsukuda		
2007	Gurren Lagann	Adjutant 副官		
2007	Moribito: Guardian of the Spirit	O no Yari 王の槍		
2007	Bokurano: Ours	Kokopelli		
2007	Princess Resurrection	Keziah Bold		
2007	Emma: A Victorian Romance	Hans		
2007	You're Under Arrest: The Drama	Red Phantom	Live-action television drama	
2007–10	Mobile Suit Gundam 00	Lasse Aeon		
2008	Yatterman	Kinpira		
2008	Kyo Kara Maoh!	Beriesu ベリエス	3rd season	
2008	To Love-Ru	Carter		
2008	Net Ghost PiPoPa	Yuzuru Aizawa		
2008	Golgo 13	Jake Quaid	TV series	
2008	Legends of the Dark King	Toki		
2008	Inazuma Eleven	Michiya Kudo		
2008–09	Cobra the Animation	Crystal Bowie	OVA series	
2008–14	Black Butler series	Baldroy		
2009	Needless	Adam Arclight		
2009–2019	Fairy Tail	Panther Lily		
2010	Mobile Suit Gundam Unicorn	Daguza Mackle	OVA	
2010	Heroman	Axel Hughes		
2010	Angel Beats!	Chaa		
2010	Psychic Detective Yakumo	Kazutoshi Gotou		
2010	A Certain Magical Index II	Acqua of the Back		
2011	Supernatural: The Anime Series	Dean Winchester		
2011	Little Battlers Experience	Len Hiyama		
2011	Inazuma Eleven Go	Michiya Kudo		
2011	Marvel Anime: Blade	Lucius Isaac		
2011	B-Daman Crossfire	Doragorudo		
2011	Chihayafuru	Hisashi Suō		
2011	Mobile Suit Gundam AGE	Grodek Ainoa		
2011	Bleach	Kūgo Ginjō		
2012	Natsume's Book of Friends	Futsuki		
2012	Aquarion Evol	Apollon		
2012	Thermae Romae	Marcus Pietras		
2012	Space Brothers	Buddy Waters		
2012	Lupin the Third: The Woman Called Fujiko Mine	Philadel Kest		
2012	From the New World	Takashi Sugiura		
2012	Code:Breaker	Chief Takada		
2013	Maoyu	White Night King		
2013	Majestic Prince	Simon Gato		
2013	The Magnificent Bastard: The Legend of Keiji	Hattori Hanzo		
2013	Futari wa Milky Holmes	Alice's father	3rd Milky Holmes TV series	
2013	Meganebu!	Tetsu Asahina		
2013–15	Ace of Diamond series	Tesshin Kataoka		
2014	Wizard Barristers	Mitsuhisa Hachiya		
2014	Brynhildr in the Darkness	Chisato Ichijiku		
2014	Yu-Gi-Oh! Arc-V	Yusho Sakaki		
2014	Chaika - The Coffin Princess	Grad Lancia		
2014	Hanayamata	Tami's father		
2014	Lord Marksman and Vanadis	Roland		
2014	Psycho-Pass 2	Teppei Sugo		
2015	The Rolling Girls	Tomomori Moritomo		
2015–20	Is the Order a Rabbit?	Rize's father		
2016	91 Days	Delphy		
2016	March Comes in Like a Lion	Masamune Gotō		
2018	The Seven Deadly Sins: Revival of The Commandments	Estarossa/Mael		
2018	Lord of Vermilion: The Crimson King	Kakihara Isshin		
2018	Xuan Yuan Sword Luminary	Tan Yuezhi		
2018–21	B: The Beginning	Eric Toga		
2019–20	Ace of Diamond Act II	Tesshin Kataoka		
2019	Fairy Gone	Jet Glaive		
2020	Plunderer	Alexandrov Grigorovich / Alan		
2020	Gibiate	Kenroku Sanada		
2021	Cestvs: The Roman Fighter	Demitrius		
2021	Dragon Quest: The Adventure of Dai	Lon Berk		
2021	Irina: The Vampire Cosmonaut	Narrator		
2021	Sakugan	Gagamba		
2021	Detective Conan: Police Academy Arc	Wataru Date		
2022	Fanfare of Adolescence	Kazuo Nohira		
2022	Chiikawa	Rōdō no Yoroi-san		
2022	Vampire in the Garden	Kubo		
2022	Cyberpunk: Edgerunners	Maine		
2022	Eternal Boys	Nicolai Asakura		
2022	Bleach: Thousand Year Blood War	Kūgo Ginjō		
2023	Boruto: Naruto Next Generations	Zansul		
2023	Reign of the Seven Spellblades	Darius Grenville		
2023	Ragna Crimson	Golem		
2023	Ron Kamonohashi's Forbidden Deductions	Vice Principal		
2023-present	Frieren	Heiter		
2024	Sengoku Youko	Raidō Zanzō		
2024	Monsters: 103 Mercies Dragon Damnation	Cyrano	ONA	
2024	As a Reincarnated Aristocrat, I'll Use My Appraisal Skill to Rise in the World	Raven Louvent		
2024	Oi! Tonbo	Kazuyoshi Igarashi		
2024	Trillion Game	Kazuki Kedōin		
2024	Mechanical Arms	Aljis		
2024	Bartender: Glass of God	Kitakata		
2024-25	Solo Leveling	Baek Yoonho		
2024-26	The Elusive Samurai	Shōkan		
2025	Catch Me at the Ballpark!	Kojiro		
2025	Apocalypse Hotel	Doorman Robot		
2025	The Too-Perfect Saint: Tossed Aside by My Fiancé and Sold to Another Kingdom	Asmodeus		
2025	Sanda	Santa Claus		
2026	The Other World's Books Depend on the Bean Counter	Kamil		
2026	Jujutsu Kaisen	Ryū Ishigōri		
2026	Ace of Diamond Act II (season 2)	Tesshin Kataoka		

=== Film ===
List of voice performances in feature films
Year	Title	Role	Notes	Source
2007	The Garden of Sinners: A Study in Murder – Part 1	Daisuke Akimi		
2008	The Garden of Sinners: Paradox Spiral	Daisuke Akimi		
2009	The Garden of Sinners: A Study in Murder – Part 2	Daisuke Akimi		
2010	Mobile Suit Gundam 00 the Movie: A Wakening of the Trailblazer	Lasse Aeon		
2010	Mardock Scramble: The First Compression	Dr. Easter		
2011	Mardock Scramble: The Second Combustion	Dr. Easter		
2012	Detective Conan: The Eleventh Striker	Kazumasa Nakaoka		
2012	Mardock Scramble: The Third Exhaust	Dr. Easter		
2013	The Garden of Sinners: Future Gospel	Daisuke Akimi		
2014	Santa Company	Nicholas White		
2014	Space Battleship Yamato 2199: Odyssey of the Celestial Ark	Saito Hajime		
2015	Psycho-Pass the Movie	Teppei Sugo		
2015	Appleseed Alpha	Talos		
2015	Cyborg 009 VS Devilman	Albert Heinrich/004		
2017	Resident Evil: Vendetta	Chris Redfield		
2017–19	Is the Order a Rabbit?	Rize's father		
2019	Blackfox	Bred		
2023	Blue Giant	Manager of "So Blue"		

=== Video games ===
List of voice performances in video games
Year	Title	Role	Notes	Source
1996	Star Ocean	Cyuss Warren		
1998	Star Ocean: The Second Story	Michael, Ernest Raviede	PS1/PS2; Also 2008 remake	
1999	Valkyrie Profile	Aluze	PS1/PS2; Also 2006 remake Lenneth	
2006	.hack//G.U. Vol. 1: Rebirth	Ovan	PS1/PS2	
2006	Valkyrie Profile 2: Silmeria	Aluze	PS1/PS2	
2006	.hack//G.U. Vol. 2: Reminisce	Ovan	PS1/PS2	
2007	Assassin's Creed	Desmond Miles		
2007	Uncharted: Drake's Fortune	Nathan Drake	PS3	
2007	Star Ocean: First Departure	Cyuss Warren	PSP	
2008	D.Gray-man: Sousha no Shikaku; D.Gray-man 奏者ノ資格	Cross Marian	PS1/PS2	
2008	Mobile Suit Gundam 00: Gundam Meisters	Lasse Aion	PS1/PS2	
2008	Valkyrie Profile: Covenant of the Plume	Shio	DS	
2009	Legends of the Dark King	Ibis	PSP	
2009	Fullmetal Alchemist: Prince of the Dawn 鋼の錬金術師 FULLMETAL ALCHEMIST -暁の王子-	Claudio Rico Aerugo	Wii	
2009	Mobile Suit Gundam: Battlefield Record UC0081	Hughes Kahlo	PS3	
2009	Uncharted 2: Among Thieves	Nathan Drake	PS3	
2009	Assassin's Creed II	Desmond Miles		
2009	Samurai Warriors 3	Muneshige Tachibana	Wii	
2009	Tales of Graces	Malik Caesar	Wii; Also f port in 2010	
2009	Fullmetal Alchemist: Daughter of the Dusk 鋼の錬金術師 FULLMETAL ALCHEMIST -黄昏の少女-	Claudio Rico Aerugo	Wii	
2009	Final Fantasy XIII	Yagu Roche	PS3	
2010	Operation Flashpoint: Dragon Rising	役名表記無し		
2010	Fate/Extra	Twice H. Pieceman	PSP	
2010	Ishin Renge Ryoma Gaiden 維新恋華 龍馬外伝	Hanpeita Takechi 武市半平太	PSP	
2010	Assassin's Creed: Brotherhood	Desmond Miles		
2010	Call of Duty: Black Ops	Dimitri Petrenko		
2011	A Certain Magical Index	Acqua of the Back	PSP	
2011	Marvel vs. Capcom 3: Fate of Two Worlds	Chris Redfield	Also Ultimate	
2011	Pandora's Tower	Husband	Wii	
2011	Rewrite	Sougen Esaka	PC; Also PSP and other ports in 2014	
2011	Dunamis 15	Tōgo Takatsuki		
2011	Uncharted 3: Drake's Deception	Nathan Drake	PS3	
2012	Lollipop Chainsaw	Lewis		
2012	Anarchy Reigns	Leonhardt "Leo" Victorion	Xbox 360	
2012	Time Travelers	Shunsuke Kai		
2012	The Legend of Nayuta: Boundless Trails	Orbus Alhazan	PSP	
2012	Dead or Alive 5	Rig	Also Last Round in 2015	
2012	Project X Zone	Chris Redfield	3DS	
2012	Yakuza 5	Yu Morinaga	PS3	
2013	PlayStation All-Stars Battle Royale	Nathan Drake		
2013	Resident Evil 6	Chris Redfield		
2014	Ryū ga Gotoku Ishin!	Chuji Matsubara		
2014	Samurai Warriors 4	Muneshige Tachibana		
2014	Super Robot Wars OG Saga: Masō Kishin F – Coffin of the End	Lionel Nielsen	PS3	
2014	Resident Evil HD Remaster	Chris Redfield		
2015	Ninja Slayer	Shigaki		
2015	Angel Beats! 1st Beat	Char	PC	
2015	Project X Zone 2	Chris Redfield	3DS	
2016	Uncharted 4: A Thief's End	Nathan Drake		
2016	Final Fantasy XV	Cor Leonis		
2017	Resident Evil 7: Biohazard	Chris Redfield		
2019	Dead or Alive 6	Rig		
2019	The Seven Deadly Sins: Grand Cross	Estarossa	iOS/Android	
2021	Resident Evil Village	Chris Redfield		
2022	Star Ocean: The Divine Force	Midas Felgreed		
2022	Tactics Ogre: Reborn	Hobyrim Vandam		
2022	Return to Shironagasu Island	Jacob Rutland	PC, Switch	
2023	Like a Dragon Gaiden: The Man Who Erased His Name	Kihei Hanawa		
2023	Sword Art Online: Last Recollection	Shasta		
2024	Like a Dragon: Infinite Wealth	Kihei Hanawa		
2024	Visions of Mana	Daelophos	PS5, XSeries, PC	

=== Audio dramas ===
List of voice performances in audio dramas
Title	Role	Notes	Source
Spirit Ring	Uri	Radio	
Shinrei Tantei Yakumo: akai hitomi wa shitte iru	Kazutoshi Gotou	Drama CD	
Message from the Psychic Detective Yakumo dead	Kazutoshi Gotou	Drama CD	

=== Tokusatsu ===
List of voice performances in anime
Year	Title	Role	Notes	Source
2000	Kamen Rider Kuuga	Buddhist man	Actor rolle	
2011	Kaizoku Sentai Gokaiger	Zatsurig	Ep. 41	
2015	Shuriken Sentai Ninninger the Movie: The Dinosaur Lord's Splendid Ninja Scroll!	Juza Yumihari	Movie	

=== Dubbing ===
List of dub performances in overseas productions
Title	Role	Voice dub for, Notes	Source
Men in Black series (TV editions)	Agent J	Will Smith	
Wild Wild West (TV edition)	Captain James T. West	Will Smith	
Bad Boys II (TV edition)	Detective Lieutenant Mike Lowrey	Will Smith	
Hitch	Alex "Hitch" Hitchens	Will Smith	
The Pursuit of Happyness (TV edition)	Chris Gardner	Will Smith	
After Earth	Kitai Raige	Will Smith	
Suicide Squad	Floyd Lawton / Deadshot	Will Smith	
Collateral Beauty	Howard Inlet	Will Smith	
King Richard	Richard Williams	Will Smith	
Avatar	Jake Sully	Sam Worthington	
Terminator Salvation	Marcus Wright	Sam Worthington	
The Debt	Young David	Sam Worthington	
Man on a Ledge	Nicholas "Nick" Cassidy	Sam Worthington	
Hacksaw Ridge	Captain Jack Glover	Sam Worthington	
The Hunter's Prayer	Lucas	Sam Worthington	
Fires	Glen Findlay	Sam Worthington	
Avatar: The Way of Water	Jake Sully	Sam Worthington	
Avatar: Fire and Ash	Jake Sully	Sam Worthington	
The Omen	Robert Thorn	Liev Schreiber	
Repo Men	Frank Mercer	Liev Schreiber	
Salt	Theodore "Ted" Winters	Liev Schreiber	
The Reluctant Fundamentalist	Bobby Lincoln	Liev Schreiber	
Ray Donovan	Raymond Donovan	Liev Schreiber	
The Butler (2016 BS Japan edition)	Lyndon B. Johnson	Liev Schreiber	
The 5th Wave	Colonel Alexander Vosch	Liev Schreiber	
Immortals	Zeus	Luke Evans	
Dracula Untold	Vlad III Țepeș	Luke Evans	
Fast & Furious 6	Owen Shaw	Luke Evans	
The Girl on the Train	Scott Hipwell	Luke Evans	
Murder Mystery	Charles Cavendish	Luke Evans	
Thick as Thieves	Gabriel Martin	Antonio Banderas	
Autómata	Jacq Vaucan	Antonio Banderas	
The Expendables 3	Galgo / Felipe Silva	Antonio Banderas	
Code Name Banshee	Caleb	Antonio Banderas	
10,000 BC	D'Leh	Steven Strait	
1408	Mike Enslin	John Cusack	
All About Steve	Steven "Steve" Miller	Bradley Cooper	
Alvin and the Chipmunks: The Squeakquel	Toby Seville	Zachary Levi	
Anna Magdalena	Chan Kar-fu	Takeshi Kaneshiro	
Arrowverse series	Leonard Snart	Wentworth Miller	
Baby Driver	Jason "Buddy" Van Horne	Jon Hamm	
Black Book	Ludwig Müntze	Sebastian Koch	
Black Widow	Clint Barton	Jeremy Renner	
Brokeback Mountain	Jack Twist	Jake Gyllenhaal	
Bull	Dr. Jason Bull	Michael Weatherly	
Buried	Paul Conroy	Ryan Reynolds	
Burnt	Adam Jones	Bradley Cooper	
Butch Cassidy and the Sundance Kid	Sundance Kid	Robert Redford	
Casablanca	Rick Blaine	Humphrey Bogart (2013 Star Channel edition)	
Casanova	Giacomo Casanova	Heath Ledger	
Chasing Mavericks	Frosty Hesson	Gerard Butler	
Desperate Housewives	John Rowland	Jesse Metcalfe season 7	
Dragon	Xu Baijiu	Takeshi Kaneshiro	
ER	Dr. Tony Gates	John Stamos	
Ford v Ferrari	Ken Miles	Christian Bale	
Go Fast	Marek/Slimane	Roschdy Zem	
Graceland	Paul Briggs	Daniel Sunjata	
Grey's Anatomy	Denny Duquette	Jeffrey Dean Morgan	
Guy Ritchie's The Covenant	Eddie Parker	Antony Starr	
Hatfields & McCoys	Bud		
Toy Story Toons: Hawaiian Vacation	Ken	Animation	
Hawkeye	Clint Barton / Hawkeye	Jeremy Renner	
Haywire	Paul	Michael Fassbender	
Hollywood Homicide	Julius Armas	Master P	
Hot Rod	Rod Kimble	Andy Samberg	
In the Name of the King	Camden Konreid	Jason Statham	
Iron Man	J.A.R.V.I.S.	Paul Bettany (2011 TV Asahi edition)	
Just Wright	Scott McKnight	Common	
Killing Season	Emil Kovač	John Travolta	
Kindaichi Case Files Neo SP 2	Byron Lee	Chun Wu (in Japanese voice after Daisuke Namikawa)	
King Arthur	King Arthur	Clive Owen	
Kramer vs. Kramer	Ted Kramer	Dustin Hoffman (2009 Blu-Ray edition)	
Live Free or Die Hard	Thomas Gabriel	Timothy Olyphant	
Lockout	Marion Snow	Guy Pearce	
Lovers	Jin ジン / 金城武	Takeshi Kaneshiro	
Lucy in the Sky	Mark Goodwin	Jon Hamm	
Masters of the Universe	Duncan / Man-At-Arms	Idris Elba	
Megamind	Metro Man	Animation	
Million Dollar Arm	J. B. Bernstein	Jon Hamm	
Moneyball	Billy Beane	Brad Pitt	
Monsters University	Johnny Worthington	Animation	
Musa	Yeo-sol	Jung Woo-sung	
Nightmare Alley	Stanton "Stan" Carlisle	Bradley Cooper	
North Face	Toni Kurz	Benno Fürmann (2020 BS Tokyo edition)	
Parasite	Park Dong-ik	Lee Sun-kyun (2021 NTV edition)	
Peter Rabbit	Peter's father		
Piranha 3D	Derrick Jones	Jerry O'Connell	
Pride & Prejudice	Mr. Darcy	Matthew Macfadyen	
Priest	Black Hat	Karl Urban	
Prince of Persia: The Sands of Time	Tus	Richard Coyle	
Prison Break	Michael Scofield	Wentworth Miller	
Prisoners	Keller Dover	Hugh Jackman (DVD edition)	
Prisoners	Detective Loki	Jake Gyllenhaal (2016 BS Japan edition)	
Public Enemies	Melvin Purvis	Christian Bale	
Ramona and Beezus	Robert Quimby	John Corbett	
Ratatouille	Horst	Animation	
Red Cliff	Zhuge Liang	Takeshi Kaneshiro	
Resident Evil: Afterlife	Chris Redfield	Wentworth Miller	
Resident Evil: Death Island	Chris Redfield	Animation	
Respect	Ted White	Marlon Wayans	
Rome	Lucius Vorenus	Kevin McKidd	
Rush	James Hunt	Chris Hemsworth (Japanese dub #2)	
Shame	David	James Badge Dale	
Spartacus: Vengeance	Gannicus	Dustin Clare	
Station Eleven	Clark Thompson	David Wilmot	
Stoker	Charlie Stoker	Matthew Goode	
Superman	Guy Gardner / Green Lantern	Nathan Fillion	
Superman Returns	Clark Kent / Superman	Brandon Routh	
Supernatural	Dean Winchester	Jensen Ackles (Season 3 onwards)	
Taxi Driver	Matthew "Sport" Higgins	Harvey Keitel	
Thank You for Smoking	Jeff Megall	Rob Lowe	
The Brothers Grimm	Wilhelm "Will" Grimm	Matt Damon	
The Counselor	The Counselor	Michael Fassbender	
The Darjeeling Limited	Peter Whitman	Adrien Brody	
The Devil Wears Prada	Christian Thompson	Simon Baker (2010 NTV edition)	
The Following	Joe Carroll	James Purefoy	
The Golden Compass	Lord Asriel	Daniel Craig	
The Good, the Bad, the Weird	Park Do-won	Jung Woo-sung	
The Handmaid's Tale	Luke Bankole	O. T. Fagbenle	
The Hobbit: The Desolation of Smaug	Thorin Oakenshield	Richard Armitage	
The Hobbit: Battle of the Five Armies	Thorin Oakenshield	Richard Armitage	
The Hurt Locker	Staff Sergeant Matthew Thompson	Guy Pearce	
The Last Time	Jamie Bashant	Brendan Fraser	
The Magnificent Seven	Bernardo O'Reilly	Charles Bronson (2013 Star Channel edition)	
The Man from Nowhere	Cha Tae-sik	Won Bin	
The Many Saints of Newark	Dickie Moltisanti	Alessandro Nivola	
The Musketeers	Captain Treville	Hugo Speer	
The Prestige	Alfred Borden/The Professor	Christian Bale	
The Son of No One	Jonathan White	Channing Tatum	
The Spirit	Denny Colt/The Spirit	Gabriel Macht	
The Three Musketeers	Athos	Matthew Macfadyen	
Tidal Wave	Man-sik	Sul Kyung-gu	
Top Gun (2009 TV Tokyo edition)	LT Tom "Iceman" Kazanski	Val Kilmer	
Top Gun: Maverick	Admiral Tom "Iceman" Kazanski	Val Kilmer	
Toy Story 3	Ken	Animation	
Ugly Betty	Daniel Meade	Eric Mabius	
Ultraviolet	Nerva	Sebastien Andrieu	
Under the Dome	Dale 'Barbie' Barbara	Mike Vogel	
Wanderlust	George Gergenblatt	Paul Rudd	
We Are Marshall	William "Red" Dawson	Matthew Fox	
What If...?	Clint Barton / Hawkeye	Animation	
The Winchesters	Dean Winchester	Jensen Ackles	
Funny Face	Han Giju		
