= Meganebu! =

Japanese anime television series

- Promotional image showing the main characters

メガネブ！
- Genre: Comedy, Slice of Life
- Anime television series
- Directed by: Sōbi Yamamoto
- Written by: Deko Akao
- Music by: Hiroaki Tsutsumi; Keiko Osaki; Shōta Hashimoto
- Studio: Studio Deen
- Licensed by: NA: Sentai Filmworks
- Original network: Tokyo MX, BS11, SUN-TV, KBS, Fukui TV
- Original run: October 6, 2013 – December 22, 2013
- Episodes: 12 (16 segments)

Meganebu! (メガネブ！; lit. "Glasses Club!") is a 2013 anime television series produced by Studio Deen and directed by Soubi Yamamoto, which is based on a series of Drama CDs released by Deen in 2011–2012. The series follows the activities of five male students who belong to their school's Glasses Club and the antics resulting from their shared passion for eyewear. The series premiered on Tokyo MX on October 6 and ended on December 22, 2013.

== Synopsis ==
The story centers on Akira Souma, an enthusiast of glasses at the rural Himaraya Third Technical School. His passion for eyewear leads him to establish the "Glasses Club" at his school and he somewhat forces his classmates and glasses wearers Takuma Hachimine, Yukiya Minabe, Mitsuki Kamatani, and Hayato Kimata to join. The series follows the activities of the Glasses Club and the antics resulting from their shared passion for eyewear.

== Characters ==
=== Glasses Club ===
Akira Souma (相馬 鏡, Sōma Akira)
Voiced by: Kenji Akabane
Akira is a second year student and president of the Glasses Club. He starts the club in hopes to successfully make X-ray glasses. He is very passionate about glasses and those who wear them, and hates anyone who doesn't wear glasses (whom he calls "No-Glassers"). He wears square-shaped glasses.
Mitsuki Kamatani (鎌谷 光希, Kamatani Mitsuki)
Voiced by: Kouki Miyata
Mitsuki is a first year member. He idolizes Akira, but doesn't seem to get along with Hayato. He wears under-rim glasses.
Takuma Hachimine (鉢嶺 拓磨, Hachimine Takuma)
Voiced by: Atsushi Tamaru
Takuma is in the class as Akira and Yukiya. He is cheerful, and really likes cream puffs. He also tends to sleep a lot. He wears Wellington glasses.
Yukiya Minabe (三鍋 友紀也, Minabe Yukiya)
Voiced by: Junichi Suwabe
Yukiya is Akira's childhood friend. He is soft spoken and always has his yPad with him. He wears half rim glasses.
Hayato Kimata (木全 隼人, Kimata Hayato)
Voiced by: Ryohei Kimura
Hayato is another first year member. He is only a provisional member of the club because he wears fake glasses, and is made fun of for this. He wears oval square glasses.

=== Student Council ===
William Satou (佐藤ウィリアム, Satō William)
Voiced by: Noriaki Sugiyama
William is the third year president of the Student Council. He is half Japanese and half British, he also suffers from chronic stomach pains. He wears round titanium framed glasses. He tends to speak his inner thoughts aloud.
Lorenzo Watanabe (渡辺ロレンツォ, Watanabe Lorenzo)
Voiced by: Mitsuaki Madono
Lorenzo is the vice-president of the Student Council. He is half Japanese and half German. He is sadistic when it comes to Satou.
Maximillian Takahashi (高橋マクシミリアン, Takahashi Maximillian)
Voiced by: Daisuke Kishio
Maximillian is a second-year member of the Student Council. He is half Japanese and half Italian. He loves the stage and tends to overreact to certain situations.
Toru Suzuki (鈴木徹, Suzuki Toru)
Voiced by: Chihiro Suzuki
Toru is a second-year member of the Student Council and the only one who is fully Japanese. He is nicknamed #3 by his classmates and hates Akira for giving him that nickname. He wears cat-eye glasses. He originally wished to join the glasses club, however his disdain for Akira calling him 3rd made him change his mind.
Antonio Tanaka (田中アントニオ, Tanaka Antonio)
Voiced by: Mitsuo Iwata
Antonio is a first-year member of the Student Council. He is half-Japanese and half-Brazilian. He has a joyous personality, but he doesn't have good Japanese skills.

=== Faculty Staff ===
Hotaka Shirogane (白銀穂貴, Shirogane Hotaka)
Voiced by: Hiroki Yasumoto
Homeroom teacher of Class 2-E and Glasses Club advisor. He wears metal rimless glasses.
Kyousuke Hariu (針生恭介, Hariu Kyosuke)
Voiced by: Hiroki Takahashi
Teaching assistant assigned to Class 2-E.
Kugishima Sachie (釘島幸恵, Kugishima Sachie)
Voiced by: Yasuhiro Takato
Cafeteria Lady. She possesses an ability to know each student's favourite food through her half-rimmed spectacles and years of accumulated experience, and strives to prepare balanced food portion for students.

=== Others ===
Hikaru Souma (相馬輝, Sōma Hikaru)
Voiced by: Atsushi Kousaka
Hikaru is Akira's younger brother. In the last episode, it is revealed that he is blind.
Satoru Hachimine (鉢嶺智, Hachimine Satoru)
Voiced by: Akira Ishida
Satoru is Takuma's oldest brother who is a designer. He wears Wellington brow type glasses.
Shinji Hachimine (鉢嶺信司, Hachimine Shinji)
Voiced by: Showtaro Morikubo
Shinji is Takuma's older brother who is a model. He wears Wellington half-rim glasses.
Tetsu Asahina (朝比奈鉄, Asahina Tetsu)
Voiced by: Hiroki Tōchi
Owner of Cafe Tet-chan. He's an alumnus and a former teacher of Hima High.
Yūto Kimata (木全悠人, Kimata Yūto)
Voiced by: Ryohei Kimura
Yūto is Hayato's older brother. He wears the same fake glasses as Hayato, making him look like a bigger Hayato.
Ikuto Kimata (木全郁人, Kimata Ikuto)
Voiced by: Ryohei Kimura
Ikuto is Hayato's younger brother. He wears the same fake glasses as Hayato, making him look like a smaller Hayato.

== Production ==
The series is produced by Studio Deen and directed by Soubi Yamamoto, along with script and series composer Deko Akao and original character designer Atsuko Nakajima. The twelve episode series premiered on Tokyo MX on October 6, 2013, and was later aired on BS11, SUN-TV, KBS and Fakui TV. The anime was picked up by Crunchyroll for streaming with English subtitles. The anime has been licensed by Sentai Filmworks in North America for digital and home video release in 2014.

The opening theme is "World's End" by MUCC and the ending theme is "Colorful World" by Tomohisa Sakou.

== Episode list ==
No.	Title	Original air date
1	"We don't use glasses merely as a vision correction tool or a fashion accessory (...) That is our Glasses Club." "megane o tada no shiryoku kyōsei aitemu, mata moteaitemu to shitede wanaku ( ... ) Shite iru waga megane-bu" (メガネをただの視力矯正アイテム、またモテアイテムとしてではなく(...) している我がメガネ部)	October 6, 2013
The Glasses Club (composed of five boys: Akira, Mitsuki, Takuma, Yukiya and Hayato) are determined to successfully create a pair of X-ray glasses in time for the school's vision test, in order to see the female nurse giving out the test naked.
2	"Any Man Who Wears Glasses Cannot Be a Bad Man / The Current Strongest Frames" "megane o kakete iru otoko ni warui otoko wa inai / nau saikyō furēmu" (メガネをかけている漢に悪い漢はいない / なう最強フレーム)	October 13, 2013
Part 1: While cleaning the old club room, Hayato finds the Glasses Club's photo albums and remembers when he saw the Glasses Club for the first time at the entrance ceremony. Part 2: After testing out frame strength on glasses after school, Yukiya has some bad luck on his way to Akira's house.
3	"I Hope You Finish the X-ray Glasses" "sukesuke megane, kansei suru to ii ne" (スケスケメガネ、完成するといいね)	October 20, 2013
The Glasses Club decide to switch all the clocks in the school with 55 minute clocks so classes can end sooner. When switching the clock in the broadcast room, Hayato finds a door behind the clock with a pair of old Ray-Bans sunglasses hidden there. Later in the club room, Yukiya finishes a new pair of X-Ray glasses; but instead of being able to see through objects, they are able to see the ghost of a student who resided in the sunglasses, Koichi Mochizuki.
4	"This is What it Means to Wear Real Glasses! / Glasses Reflect the Soul and Who You Truly Are" "kore ga honmono no megane nanda yo! / megane wa kokoro de ari onore jishin" (これが本物のメガネなんだよ！ / メガネは心であり己自身)	October 27, 2013
Part 1: Mitsuki discovers the perfect smile to glasses ratio, remembers first seeing Akira at the entrance ceremony, and tries to prevent Akira from breaking the Glasses Club laws. Part 2: Takuma has trouble taking care of his glasses, causing them to break.
5	"Even if He is, He Wouldn't Tell Some Jerk in Fake Glasses / It's an ultrasonic cleaner for glasses with lenses" "atte mo datemegane nanka ni iu wake nai / lenzu atte no chōonpasenjōki" (あってもダテメガネなんかに言うわけない / レンズあっての超音波洗浄機)	November 3, 2013
Part 1: Akira's fear of bugs keeps him from running an errand for Mr. Shirogane and going to the club on time. Part 2: The club tests their newest X-ray glasses model by powering it with a five person bike. When it fails, they go on a bike ride, and eventually get caught in the rain.
6	"MR"	November 10, 2013
Akira conducts an MR (megeane lens) Snap Inspection to test the quality of the club member's lenses. Afterwards, they find a flyer advertising Glasses Celeb, a new type of glasses wipe. The club goes all over town trying to buy some, but it's sold out in every drug store they visit. Little do they know, that this is a scheme by the Himaraya Student Council.
7	"Come, Glasses Wearers! Your Glasses Will Change the World!" "Kitare! Megane mono! Omae no megane ga sekai o kaeru" (来たれ！メガネ者！お前のメガネが世界を変える)	November 17, 2013
The Student Council threatens to disband the Glasses Club if they don't find a fifth member by the end of the day.
8	"As Long As My Glasses Sparkle, You Won't Get Away With It!" "megane ga pikkapikana uchi wa sō wa ikimasen" (メガネがぴっかぴかなうちはそうはいきません)	November 24, 2013
The Glasses Club members have some bad luck during lunch time. Mitsuki believes it was all a set up and tries to find the culprit behind it.
9	"A Revolution for Glasses Wearers" "megane mono-tachi ni totte no kakumei" (メガネ者達にとっての革命)	December 1, 2013
Akira, Takuma, and Yukiya go on a field trip to Okinawa and end up stranded on a deserted island. Meanwhile, Mitsuki really misses Akira.
10	"The Rules Say You're Safe, But Glasses Say You're Out/When I Look at the Glasses Club, It Makes Me Think of Us Back Then" "rūru-teki ni wa sēfudaga, megane-teki ni wa auto/megane-bu no yatsura o mi teru to, tōji no oretachi o omoidasu" (ルール的にはセーフだが、メガネ的にはアウト / メガネ部の奴らを見てると、当時の俺達を思い出す)	December 8, 2013
Part 1: The Glasses Club find a cursed Glasses Sugoroku game, which puts them in a life or death situation. Part 2: Shirogane reminisces about when he was a Hima High student.
11	"It's Only Natural That Glasses Wearers Love Glasses" "Megane mono nara megane o aishite atarimaeda" (メガネ者ならメガネを愛して当たり前だ)	December 15, 2013
Hima High is preparing for the upcoming culture festival. The Student Council plans to build a tower, titled the "Grand Cross Blizzard Eternal SS Tower", as the main attraction, but no one else in the school helps out. The Glasses Club decides to help out after Akira overhears President William talk about how he wanted to build the tower to make Hima High more popular.
12	"Glasses Club!" "メガネブ！" (meganebu!)	December 22, 2013
It's the day of the Hima High culture festival. The Glasses Club's display, the "Come Glasses Wearers! Treasure Hunt Game", becomes very popular with the other students and gets them all to wear glasses, but in all the excitement the X-ray Glasses Mk. 42 go missing. Later, the Grand Cross Blizzard Eternal SS Tower is unveiled.
