= List of Princess Resurrection characters =

This is a list of characters from the manga and anime series Princess Resurrection.

== Main characters ==
Hiro Hiyorimi (日和見日郎, Hiyorimi Hirō?)

- Voiced by: Fuyuka Oura (TV Series), Miyu Irino (OVA) (Japanese), Blake Shepard (English)

The main protagonist and a normal yet brave middle school teenager who dies at the beginning of the series (in the manga he was hit by a van that went out of control after ricocheting off Flandre, whereas in the anime he was hit by a falling iron I-beam after pushing Hime out of the way). He finds himself in Hime's service as he is bound to her because her blood (flame, in the anime) revived him. Though young and not very strong, Hiro manages to assist Hime (mostly by being a human shield) through his "half-immortality" that was given to him after his resurrection. At first, he'd rather not be involved in these battles, but as he learns more about Hime, Hiro becomes more willing to protect her. His body changes in the manga when Hime's life is in danger, a fact that he notices and causes him to rush to Hime, though this is left out in the anime.
In the anime (episode 24), Hiro realizes he has developed feelings for Hime and tries to kiss her, but she slaps him in the face, not because she did not want him to kiss her (this is uncertain), but because the gang was watching them, a theory made by Reiri in that moment: "Hiro, you were too slow." It was stated by Sherwood, and apparently noticed by Hime, that Hiro has the potential to become the greatest blood warrior. The reason was not shown, because Hiro runs to save Hime before Sherwood can reveal the reason. In chapter 35, it is also implied that Hiro has some sort of connection to the Monster World, which makes him special. This was stated by Gilliam, after his assassination attempt failed because of Hiro's intervention.

Weapons used: Grass Cutter, Axe, Broomstick, Candle Stick, Metal Pole.

Hime (姫, Hime)

- Voiced by: Ayako Kawasumi (TV Series), Saori Hayami (OVA) (Japanese); Shelley Calene-Black (English)

The titular character of the series, a young 17-year-old aristocratic woman wearing Gothic clothing and apparently of German descent. Hime is the second royal princess of the Phoenix Tribe whose real name is Lillianne von Phoenix (リリアーヌ, Ririānu), though she hates being referred to by that name. Though a member of the Royal Family, Hime has no active interest in inheriting the throne but is forced to fight against her siblings due to their kind's rulings that the siblings must kill each other. This is due to the fact that Phoenixes are mortal before fully maturing and thus would disrupt order among the monsters if multiple adult phoenixes endlessly battle for the throne. Though playfully arrogant, she is desensitized towards violence and is not above personally killing an opponent with various weapons suited for the scenario. As a member of the royal family, Hime can convert a corpse into a half-immortal soldier through her blood ("Flame of Life" in the anime) with the reanimated servant's life needing to be prolonged. While this ability can be used on anything that has died, it is considered taboo for user to use it on themselves, other members of their clan or those they've personally killed. Prior to the series, she had an army of servants who all laid down their lives to ensure her escape when her castle was compromised by zombies sent by her brother, Severin. She resurrects Hiro on a whim after he died saving her when she moved to Sasanaki Village out of a fascination with humans. She becomes a temporary half-vampire in order to save Hiro in the manga chapter 'Princess Blood'. Her relationship with Hiro remains uncertain in the anime, but they are clearly becoming closer in the manga.
In chapters 47 and 55, an alternate version of her is shown to have been forcefully transported nine years into the future. As soon as she arrives, she is attacked by a powerful monster that nearly overwhelms her, but wins thanks to the encouragement of the present day Hiro who she contacts via Riza's cellphone. She later walks to Sherwood's mansion where she learns only they and Sylvia remain. She leaves everything to Sherwood and confronts Sylvia at her mansion. They have a duel but is severely wounded by the mermaid who Sylvia entrusted to Emile. Sylvia then swings her sword down at her; however, future Hiro intervenes and stops the blow and rescues her. Following her final battle with Sylvia, Hime loses her abilities as a Phoenix and is allowed to live a normal life while going by her real name.

Weapons used: Rapier, Chainsaw, Axe, Hammer, Cross-Sword, Circular Saw, Defibrillator, Broken Cue Stick, Flail, Mace, Pitchfork, Baseball Bat, Traps, Trident, Dumplings, Katana, Chandelier, Revolver, Shotgun, Sword, Rifle, Jackhammer.

Flandre (フランドル, Furandoru)

- Voiced by: Shiho Kawaragi (TV Series), Yuka Iguchi (OVA) (Japanese); Bree Welch (English)

A child-like gynoid in the service of Hime, nicknamed "Flan". Her small stature belies her incredible strength and dense body. Like other robots that were created by Frankenstien to serve the Royal Family, Flan is assigned as Hime's bodyguard and menial labor with a self-destruct protocol installed to activate the moment Hime dies. Although she puts on the same expression all the time, she knows when her friends are in danger. She assists Hime in moving objects, serves as a driver and occasionally helps Hiro. She only says one word: "Hooba" in the English version, "Fuga" (or sometimes "Huga" depending on the translation) in the Japanese. She has a special function in her eyes to view hard-to-see things, her vision has a German language HUD and she knows how to drive vehicles. Being a gynoid, her weight is a few tons and she's capable of running out of power and needing to recharge. In episode 10 of the series, Flandre formed a relationship with Ciel, alongside helping repair him.
In the anime special, she went berserk when she wound up with a screw loose. Emile got Flanders to remedy that and prevented her from self-destructing.

Weapons used: Broken Tree, Lance, Chainsaw, Telephone/Electricity Mast.

Sawawa Hiyorimi (日和見紗和々, Hiyorimi Sawawa)

- Voiced by: Yūko Minaguchi (TV Series), Ai Kayano (OVA) (Japanese); Monica Rial (English)

Hiro's sister, who is a maid employed by Hime do to her cooking being recognized by Hime as the best. She is seemingly oblivious to the supernatural aspects of and surrounding Hime, nor does she seem to understand Hiro's explanation of his immortality. Hiro sometimes appears troubled that his sister is so dense but in truth it is rather convenient because he could never make up excuses that would explain everything without mentioning the supernatural. She lives a normal life in spite of all the supernatural phenomena happening around her, and is completely oblivious to it. Sawawa is also known for having unusually large breasts.
In the future, she is stated to have died from the bomb explosion that threw Hime into the future.
In the anime, her surname is also Hiyorimi as she introduced herself to Hime. In the manga, there is not much shown of her, but she appeared more in the anime where she is often shown eating strawberry parfaits at the café. Her age is unknown, but it's somewhere between senior year high school and maybe second year of university if she attended. Sawawa is always dressed in maid outfit, even when going out, has naturally large and bouncy breasts, is extremely easygoing and has a kind nature that allows her to accept everybody and always looks at the good in people. For example, not batting an eye when Riza freeloads despite her rough nature or inviting a vampire into the house courteously even though it was a stranger. A running gag in the anime involves her sitting up in shock while eating at a nearby cafe whenever Hiro sustains an injury that would be lethal under ordinary circumstances, suddenly think of something minor like noticing a new menu item (and never thinking of anything violent or scary in nature), only to calm down and go back to eating her parfait. She addresses Hime as "Oujo-Sama" (Mistress in English).

Riza Wildman (リザ·ワイルドマン, Riza Wairudoman)

- Voiced by: Yūko Kaida (TV Series), Eri Kitamura (OVA) (Japanese); Luci Christian (English)

A half-breed tomboy girl who is the daughter of the werewolf, Volg Wildman and an unnamed human woman, raised by her brother (named "Lobo Wildman" in anime) under the ideals of being an honorable werewolf clan. When Riza confronts Hime over killing her brother, she learns her brother died honorably and that the fight was orchestrated by Prince Duken using her to force her brother to attack Hime. Thus Riza offers her services to Hime in the hopes of avenging her brother should Duken attack Hime. As a hybrid, Riza possesses superhuman strength and senses but, while less physically powerful compared to a full-blooded werewolf, Riza can turn her forearms into large wolf paws while being practically invincible under the light of a full moon. When she was brought into prison it is revealed that she is stronger than the highest ranking werewolf that was imprisoned there and she was able to kill a strong pureblood vampire despite not relying on the moons power, being the result of being an experienced fighter with her human nature allowing her to adapt to any situation for an advantage over stronger enemies. Appears to have feelings of companionship for Hiro. Much to her embarrassment, Riza has "squishy" pads (some translations describe them as having a comfortingly soft feel) inside her paws, according to Hiro and one of his classmates. She also initially disliked Reiri due to their opposing natures, but gradually got along with the vampire. When she was helped by Reiri in the vampire kingdom, she was temporarily turned into a hybrid of vampire and werewolf, although this didn't appear to have any other effect than to mask her presence to the other vampires. It was revealed that Riza is a virgin in her conversation with Reiri. She particularly enjoys fast vehicles, much to Hiro's horror when he's dragged along, despite this they're on friendly terms with each other and Riza actually teases Hiro the least out of all the girls.
In the Future, Riza is stated to have died from the bomb explosion that threw Hime into the future.

Her name was changed to "Liza Wildman" in the English dub.

Weapons used: Metal Pole, Rifle.

Reiri Kamura (嘉村令裡, Kamura Reiri)

- Voiced by: Mamiko Noto (TV Series), Aki Toyosaki (OVA) (Japanese); Emily Neves (English)

A pureblood vampire who attends the same school as Hiro, Reiri has long black hair, always dresses in a dark sailor fuku and has idol status at her school. In the manga, there are many scenes showing her in black underwear, but in the anime those are reduced to panchira. Reirei made an attempt to get Hime's blood by using Hiro after she turn him into a lesser vampire. Though the plan failed and Hiro was cured, Hime spared Reirei's life as she had no relation to the vampire in the hospital. She was later banished from the vampire society by Kiniski after she helped Riza fight him, being hunted by the lesser vampires he sired for three days straight before they nearly kill her while burning down the abandoned church she was living in. But she was saved by Riza, Hiro, Hime, Flandre, Sherwood, Francesca and Francette, having since become a freeloader at Hime's mansion. While she greatly detested Riza at first, Reirei eventually grew to respect the half-werewolf. Other than the blood from members of the Royal family, female virgins and a cute guy within reason, she also enjoys drinking tomato juice. She enjoys eating Sawawa's meals and seems to be able to get just enough sustenance from food to allow her to survive for a short period on just a few drops of blood. This way she is able to use a small knife to get blood from her "lambs" at school in a "ritual" without needing to use her fangs or mind control to feed. Since it is only a few drops and most of the school idolizes her, they're willing to accommodate her "fetish" as a means to be closer to her than others while thinking she's only pretending to be a vampire.
As a pure-blood, besides superhuman strength, speed and healing, Reirei possesses many abilities that include flight, pseudo-teleportation by separating herself into bats and reforming elsewhere, siring lesser vampires and alter other people's memories. Unlike lesser vampires, garlic and crosses are only irritating and sunlight only weakens her to point where she can't fly and experiences brief fainting spells if exposed for too long. During an attack in Hiro's dream, it's indicated that too much direct exposure, especially when asleep, can be dangerous if not fatal. However, she is able to attend school during the day without any trouble as she uses frail health as an excuse to keep the length of exposure down. She cannot cross large bodies of water on her own as just being over a bridge or on a boat severely drains her. For example, while in the possessed truck of a murderer, she tells Riza that while baths and showers are fine, vampires can't handle large bodies of water. Death is almost guaranteed if stakes of white ash are driven into a vampire's heart, although Zepelli survived Kiniski's staking him due to the fact that the hospital it happened at was under his control and he was very skilled. She, like all vampires, still can't enter a private residence without an invitation, although she can drive everyone out by setting the place on fire. Also, she can't enter an Evil God's established territory, and will be pushed out if she's in a place annexed by an Evil God, possibly for a similar reason as she can't enter a residence uninvited. Although she was still able to enter the school when Naqua was using it, she wasn't able to enter Naqua's shrine, or either of the towns claimed by either the Snake (school Riza investigated) or the Rat (Hot Springs) Evil Gods. But she was able to enter a territory where Evil Gods were replaying a family's murder in an endless loop by holding onto Hiro who'd somehow pop in when Hime was in danger of dying.
At first, she greatly detests Riza but their relations change gradually for the better.
In the future, she saves Hime from the monster attacking her and was about to share the details about the bomb explosion nine years ago but is attacked and subsequently killed by the same monster. However, Reirei is able to hang on just long enough to look at the back of the painting Hiro hid an axe behind for answers as to how she was transported into the future.

Weapons used: Wooden Stakes, Razor-Sharp Fingernails.

Sherwood (シャーウッド, Shāuddo)

- Voiced by: Ai Shimizu (TV Series), Ayana Taketatsu (OVA) (Japanese); Hilary Haag (English)

Hime's little sister, the third princess of the Royalty. Her hair color, eyes and dress are similar to Hime's. She has the ability to freely control the man-eating plant Triffid, which she used in a failed attempt to kill Hime. She once harbored ill will toward Hime, but later reconciled, and has a big crush on Hiro and will do almost anything to make him her servant. After that she moved into a mansion on the hill opposite Hime's mansion.
In the future, an eighteen-year-old Sherwood, along with Sylvia, is the last remaining participant in the battle for the throne and is losing to Sylvia. She intends to entrust everything to Hime, but Hime declines and entrusts everything to Sherwood instead as she ends up becoming the winner by default after her older sisters' powers canceled each other out.

Weapons used: None.

Francisca (フランシスカ, Furanshisuka)

- Voiced by: Rika Morinaga (Japanese); Stephanie Wittels (English)

The gynoid serving Sherwood, Francisca dresses in a maid costume and wears spectacles. She is the sister machine of Flandre and has equal abilities, with the exception of a superior intellect. She obeys Sherwood's instructions without questions, although she will try and prevent Sherwood from doing anything that might cause herself harm. She also excels in melee combat and can flick pellets at bullet-like speeds with just her fingers.

Weapons used: Broken Tree, Small Pin Balls.

Ryu-ryu (劉劉, Ryū Ryū)

- Voiced by: Akio Kato (Japanese); Leraldo Anzaldua (English)

A giant panda revived by Sherwood's blood. Died when he was strangled by a tire that he was playing with at Sasanagi Zoo. (In the anime, he appeared to have died during Zeppeli's attack. He was only knocked out during that battle, and Sherwood realized this when she went to revive him. So in the anime he never died or was revived). He is also the sworn brother of Can-can and Chou-chou (in reference to ROTK), the other two pandas in the zoo. It is unknown if the other two are blood warriors, but all three pandas are now living at Sherwood's residence. Similar to Hiro, Ryu-ryu's fur turns white when Sherwood is in danger, this causes him to be mistaken at times for a white bear; he's also fairly intelligent as he realized that Sherwood was responsible for his resurrection and sought her out without any assistance. While he's only been seen fighting with his claws, in the manga he and the other two are shown wielding cross-bladed polearms together at the end of the chapter.

Weapons used: Panda Claws.

Naqua (南久阿, Nakua)

- Voiced by: Hiromi Konno (OVA) (Japanese)

Naqua is a spider goddess who protects Sasanaki City from rogue deities before her worshipers ceased the practice of human sacrifices, having since made her home in the basement of Hiro's school where she feeds on the students lured there in by a ghost story which she considers ideal payment in protecting the school itself. Hime allowed Naqua to do as she pleases, the spider blamed her for Riza and Reiri driving her out of Hiro's school as she attempted revenge by sending Hime and her servants back in time to the Ice Age before moving to a school in a nearby town. But Naqua later aligns herself with Hime when an Evil God she defeated long ago invades her territory and she is too weak to fight him, teaching Hime the means to kill deities as a sign of trust. Naqua currently resides in a small shrine built by Flandre and Francesca near Hime's mansion and now accepts different offers, like sweets made by Sawawa. The shrine is revealed in the manga to have a stairway (in an alternate space) leading to a bridge she is building to connect the human world to the realm of Evil Gods (also said to be the "World of Dreams"), explaining to Hime that it has nothing to do with Phoenixes. She has the ability to summon large spiders as well as turn her head into spider legs.
After the end of the manga Princess Resurrection, she starred in her own spin-off manga titled Naqua-den where she's reunited with her servant Taroumaru who concealed himself within the body of Tarou Kanda while dealing with the Aregami running rampant in Japan.

== Enemies ==
=== Sylvia's Faction ===
Sylvia (シルヴィア, Shiruvia)

- Voiced by: Kikuko Inoue (OVA)

A member of the Royalty and Hime's older sister, whom she was very close to despite making her sister hate her. She was captured by her former servant Kinishki to use for his own agenda of ruling the Monster Kingdom. She is shown wearing a dress while being blindfolded, gagged, and restrained by leather straps with a tap installed on her where blood can be collected for Kinishki's use. Despite this setup she is not in the least bit bothered, though she express personal dismay of not having the pleasure of personally killing Severin after enjoying the news of death. Sylvia is later freed by Micasa and rejoins the Royal War with Micasa as her new blood warrior.
In the future, Sylvia had killed Duken and nearly almost kills Sherwood when a time displaced Hime intervenes. She duels Hime but is interrupted by the mermaid who wounds Hime. Sylvia prepares to deal the final blow, but is stopped by an older and much more battle-hardened Hiro who spirits Hime to safety. It would later be revealed that Sylvia was secretly murdered by Emile and made into his half-immortal warrior. Once fully matured, Sylvia abandons her servants and absorbs the newly awakened Fuhito into her mind along with Hime and Hiro to settle things in a duel that ends with the sisters losing their phoenix power and rendered mortal.

Kiniski (キニスキー, Kinisukī)
A vampire duke living in a castle on the edge of the Monster Kingdom, referred as "Werewolf Killer Kiniski" for having killed over 200 werewolves. He was originally staked by Sylvia who recruited him as a half-immortal servant, only for him to betray her and hold her captive in his castle to use for his own agenda while feeding on her blood to prolong his life. Riza and Reiri interfered and, through the talk with Riza, it was revealed that he was the one responsible for banishing Reiri from vampire society by framing her with the crime of injuring Zeppeli, a fellow vampire. He later used sorcery in attempt to kill Hime with a curse, only her to break his spell and keep him from entering her mansion right before sunrise. Although not shown explicitly, it is assumed that he died due to the expiration of his blood powers. His shriveled corpse was later seen inside his castle.
Did not appear in the anime but his role is filled by Duke Dracul in the anime.

Micasa (ミカサ, Mikasa)

- Voiced by: Sayaka Ohara (Japanese); Stephanie Wittels (English)

Originally Severin's blood warrior, a silent young human girl with long black hair whom Severin made into a half-immortal after he killed her. While human like Hiro, she is enhanced by a parasitic bio-weapon implanted in her head that gives her heightened combat abilities and Witchblade like powers. Micasa is a subject of the Fly Man, joining him in order to save her terminally ill younger sister. She later becomes Sylvia's servant at the Fly Man's suggestion to prolong her life after Severin's death.

Francette (フランセット, Furansetto)
A gynoid, like Flandre and Francisca, created to serve Sylvia, imprisoned by Kiniski. A sister machine to Flandre, her appearance is that of an adult female in a maid costume. She uses a large drill, which replaced her destroyed left forearm as a weapon. She later joins forces with the Fly Man and Micasa to free her mistress. In the later manga chapters her large drill has been replaced with a forearm. She can only be seen in the 3rd OVA of the anime as a background character.

=== Zeppeli's Faction ===
Zeppeli (ツェペリ, Tseperi)

- Voiced by: Kenyu Horiuchi (Japanese); Chris Patton (English)

A male vampire with dark skin, silver hair and a goatee. Owner of the Sasanagi Hospital which is the vampires' base. He pursues the blood of Hime too but prefers to execute plans behind the scenes. Because he had a cooperative relationship with Reiri, he became looked upon with hostility from the vampire society, too.

Housei Sanagida (蛹田方正, Sanagida Housei)

- Voiced by: Mitsuo Senda (Japanese); David Wald (English)

Director of the Sasanagi Hospital, and a subordinate of Zeppeli. He is the mad scientist archetype and is trying to discover the secret to immortality. He noticed Hiro's immortality and tried to conduct brutal experiments on him. He was killed by Hime with a defibrillator but revived himself with the drug Trioxin. He was defeated once again when Flandre exploded a roomful of lime dust.

Ciel (シエル, Shieru)

- Voiced by: Tokuyoshi Kawashima (Japanese); Brian Jay (English)

A tall android. Unlike Flandre, who can only say "Fuga", Ciel is capable of normal conversation. In addition to that he also understands Flandre's words. He has memories of working in the deuterium mine of the kingdom some three years prior to the start of the series. While escaping, he was touched by the view of the sea and longed to live a free life. He happened to meet Flandre, while walking in town and helped with the upkeep of Hime's mansion. In the time he was being repaired by Flandre, he developed a relationship with her. However, he was in fact made by Zeppeli only ten days prior to the episode he featured in, and the twenty-seven years of memories he had, were implanted in him. He tried to capture Hime but was defeated by Sherwood and Francesca. He learned of his false life, and when Flandre was damaged and unable to be repaired, he decided to spare his own part to her. Then, in revenge, he went back to Zeppeli and self-destructed.

=== Emile's Faction ===
Emile (エミール, Emīru)

- Voiced by: Yuya Uchida (TV), Akira Ishida (OVA) (Japanese); David Wald (English)

A member of the Royalty and one of Hime's older brothers. A youth with elegant looks who wears a decorative shirt. There is hostility between him and Hime, but he treasures their relationship and tries to keep it in balance. He can inflict a psychokinetic attack with just a glare, he is the only one so far that has this strange ability among the siblings of Royalty, but using it too often or too strongly severely taxes his health. It's also hinted that he can occasionally "see" the future, but how far, how accurate, and how many possible futures seen and the actions leading to them is unknown. Emile was murdered by Sledge after destroying Gilliam's train, and revived as Sylvia's blood warrior in an act that is considered taboo in the Phoenix clan. After being discovered, his ability no longer fatal to him while acting like a mindless automaton, Emile attempts to kill Hime with Keziah and Sledge killed in the process. Emile's spirit somehow transforms into an incomplete "adult mode phoenix". By increasing the energy of his spirit, he was able to appear as a figure surrounded by the same flames adult Royales use. He soon starts aiding his younger siblings, Hime and Sherwood. Before disappearing from Hime and Sherwood, he asks Sherwood to help Hime, and then tells Hime that she must inherit the throne, before disappearing for good.

Flanders (フランダース, Furandāsu)

- Voiced by: Yukiko Takaguchi (TV) (Japanese); Samuel Roman (English)

An android built by Frankenstien to support Emile, a diminutive non-human looking robot butler piloting a larger robot. Unlike the other robots Frankenstien created, due to Frankenstein taking a personal investment in Emile, Flanders is modified to override his Royalty-neutral directive with the exo-armor's eyes outfitted with photon cannons. In Chapter 56, Princess Destiny, it was noted that Flanders had broken down sometime ago, alluding to Emile's status as Sylvia's blood warrior serval as Flanders is programmed to self-destruct upon Emile's dead and to never harm any living member of the Royal Family save those who are dead, undead, or half-immortal. Flanders's exo-armor is later destroyed by Gillam, using its head module to launch an assault on Sasanaki before being destroyed. Flanders' actual body is later seen deactivated in Emile's room following his master's death

Keziah Bold (キザイア·ボルド, Kizaia Borudo)

- Voiced by: Hiroki Touchi (TV), Yuuichi Nakamura (OVA) (Japanese); Jay Hickman (TV) (English)

A werewolf serving Emile. He smokes cigars and has four scars across his face. His father is Kadaria Bold. He and Riza's father were comrades in a past war and he respects Volg as a great warrior. Later in the chapter (Chapter 56, Princess Destiny), Keziah is killed by the converted Emile when he takes a deathblow meant for Hime. Hime tells Hiro she won't turn Keziah into a blood warrior as werewolves believe that the highest honor is to die in battle, and that the werewolf's honor would be tarnished if revived. Before dying, with Riza honoring it, he sees Hime and tells her that she reminds him of Emile. Riza honored his death. But to Riza's disgust, Keziah is forcefully resurrected by Emile as a Flame Warrior to pass something onto Madeleine before later being destroyed by Emile.

Madeleine

- Voiced by: Ai Kayano (OVA)

Known as the Mermaid (人魚, Ningyo), she was a child who was held captive in a ghost ship, her flute music appears as SOS signals to other ships and thus draw them near for the evil within the ship to feed on their souls (Does this by turning invisible or 'phasing out' to anyone not on board or touching its hull, then 'appears' before the rushing rescue boat who then crashes into the ghost ship killing the crew). While she became human to be with her love, Madeleine was cursed to die the moment she utters a word which came to pass when Keziah retrieved her on Emilie's order and forced to speak to save his life before being revived as Emile's blood warrior. Her name is finally revealed after Sylvia takes her in after 'resurrecting' Emile. This is because all members of the royal family have a duty to protect endangered species (like mermaids) and Emile's blood wouldn't keep Madeleine alive anymore once he was resurrected. So Sylvia had Emile "give" Madeleine to her.

Sledge (スレッジ)

- Voiced by: Satoshi Hino (OVA)

A man with wings of indeterminate species who wears night vision goggles, first seen with Emile and others to witness Severin and Hime's duel, later in chapters with Emile. He later betrays Emile by killing him and letting Sylvia "save" his master by turning him into a blood warrior, only to be later killed by Emile once his actions were exposed before having a chance to explain how he considered his actions to be Emile's benefit.

=== Severin's Faction ===
Severin (セブラン, Seburan)

- Voiced by: Hiroaki Hirata (Japanese); Kalob Martinez (English)

Hime's older brother, the fifth prince, is an ambitious member of the Phoenix Tribe who aims for the throne. His appearance is that of a bishōnen with sharp eyes and blond hair, and he wears a black coat with feathers woven at the shoulder. Unlike his siblings, Severin is a fearful coward who abuses his power and spitefully breaks their family's taboos from converting his victims into immortal soldiers and using zombies to attack Hime on two occasions. In the aftermath of the second occasion, Serverin attempted to frame Hime of using zombies so he can prolong their fight to adulthood, only for Hime to settle things in a duel and killing him.

Franz (フランツ, Furantsu)
A butler-type android serving Severin, his characteristic bring a scar around his mechanical left eye. In the end, Franz self-destructed upon his master's death.

=== Gilliam's Faction ===
Gilliam (ギリヤム, Giriyamu)

- Voiced by: Jouji Nakata (OVA)

Member of the royalty, Hime's older brother wearing all white. He first appeared in chapter 35, where he is seen attempting to kill Hime during the phenomena. He appeared at chapter 38 where he fired at the train which Hiro and Emile are on . He told Hime that the Professor had abandoned them and was letting Emile win. He wanted to blow the train up for the benefit of all and asked Hime which side she was on. He was shown to be skilled with the sword and will do whatever it takes to reach his goal. After the train incident he and Hime remained in a hostile, though somewhat more peaceful, relationship. His current target is apparently Duken. In the future, he was killed by Duken.

Fretellus

- Voiced by: Yuka Iguchi (OVA)

An android serving Gilliam, he is a very large, powerfully built android who dresses in a tuxedo and wears a headgear with three lens on it. He was destroyed after Emile hurled Gilliam's cannon back to Gilliam. Gilliam later steals a Mark II version from the Professor.

Sword Being

A living sword shown during the train arc, it is a long sabre and is capable of flight/at least some locomotion in the air. It is Gilliam's blood warrior. Normally it looks like a normal sword, however, after being broken by Hime's chainsaw, living tissue and an eye grew around it when Gilliam gave it blood.

Bug

A giant arthropod monster that is the blood warrior under Gilliam. Gilliam attempted to use it to kill Emile in the train and it took the combined efforts of Keziah and Riza to defeat it. its head and legs bear a strong resemblance to the bugs from Starship Troopers. When Gilliam first poured it into the train car it resembled the "that" Hime killed in the Motel.

=== Duken's Faction ===
Duken (デユケン, Deyuken)
The oldest member of the royalty and Riza's mortal enemy for using her to force her brother Wildman to attack Hime. Duken first appeared in chapter 44, where he is seen to be searching for Sylvia during the Sasanaki graveyard incident. His only visible clothing is a cloak that covers the lower part of his face and what seems to be a jumpsuit. While having taken part in the previous Throne War and assumed to be the survivor, he was actually killed by his older brother Fuhito who hid himself away to outlive his siblings while having a robot double of Duken created to a figurehead until he has fully healed himself. However, Sylvia learned of this and killed Duken.

Franz

The android that serves Duken, build in the form of a dog instead of having a humanoid shape.

Riza's brother (リザの兄, Riza no Ni)

- Voiced by: Eiji Takemoto (Japanese); Samuel Roman (English)

Referred only as Wildman in the manga, in the anime his full name is revealed to be Lobo Wildman. A full-blooded werewolf warrior who respects and cares very much for his sister Riza, whom he raised after their father died. Originally Hime's servant, Wildman was forced to turn on her when Duken took an unsuspecting Riza hostage and died fighting Hime as she stabbed him in the head with her sword. Hime expresses respect for Wildman maintaining his sense of honor despite his betrayal, burying him on the manor grounds and revealing how his death occurred to Riza.

Droid Army

An army of droids that serve Duken. They are shown to be armed with multiple weapons such as a flamethrower and harpoon-like claws.

=== Assassins ===
Monster assassins that were sent to kill Hime.

Three Werewolves
Alex Voiced by: Hiroshi Tsuchida (Japanese); Andrew Love (English)
Karim Voiced by: Masaya Taketsuka (Japanese); Samuel Roman (English)
Sarome Voiced by: Yasuhiro Masaya (Japanese); Chris Hutchison (English)
Three werewolf blood warriors. In the manga, it is unknown to who sent them. In the anime, they are under Severin.

"That" (アレ, are)
Appeared in "Princess Locked Room" (密室王女). A nameless spider-like monster with eyes around its body referred to as "That" by Hime. In the manga, it enters a person and eats them from the inside, while in the anime it eats the person's soul. It's unknown who sent it in the manga version, while Zeppeli sent it in the anime. The anime version renames the creature "It".

Pharaoh (ファラオ, Farao)
Voiced by: Dai Matsumoto (Japanese); Andy McAvin (English)
A warrior in a pharaoh mask. It led an army of mummies to attack Hime's residence. Planting a scout beforehand, they struck when Hime was weakened by a cold. Hiro, Flandre, and Riza struggled to defeat the mummy army.

Spiderbats (コウモリグモ, koumorigumo)
As the name suggests, they are monsters with the features of a bat and spider. A large number are sent to attack Sherwood's residence. In the anime version the spiderbats are sent by Zeppeli. They are a homage to the Bat Rat Spider from the 1959 film The Angry Red Planet.

Nightmare Assailant (悪夢の攻撃者, akumu no kougeki sha)
Caused everyone in the mansion to experience a nightmare which is reminiscent of the Akasabi Village events. Hime saw through it and returned to reality where she defeated the real enemy.

Clone Plants (複製植物, fukusei shokubutsu)
It clones the organism it stings, and attempts to substitute the original organism with the clone. It is said to come from a space meteor with "That". They are a homage to the Pod People from the film Body Snatchers. They cloned multiple weaker and less intelligent copies of Reiri and Riza while trying attack to Hime. One clone of Hime was also produced which, possessing Hime's noble traits, sacrificed herself to save the original.

Shapeshifter
A blob monster that attempted to get close to Hime by participating in a race in the form of Hiro. Does not appear in the manga.

=== Others ===
Poseidon (ポセイ·どん)

- Voiced by: Shigenori Souya (Japanese); Rob Mungle (English)

One of the fishmen race who appear to be a homage of the monster from Creature from the Black Lagoon. He is much bigger compared to humans and other mermen; his size can be compared to hills and buildings. The Merman lost to Riza in a duel. In the manga, he died after the duel but in the anime he is still living and fell in love with Riza. In the manga he was not given any name, but was named Poseidon in the anime.

Headless Horseman (首無し騎士, kubi nashi kishi)
The Headless Horseman appears at the Sasanagi Pass looking for his head. However, unknown to him, it was Zeppeli who took his head. The head was retrieved by Hiro and Riza. In the manga, the story started with Zeppeli taking the head, but in the anime it started with the race between Riza and the Horseman, with the head incident as a smaller sub-plot. He is renamed Knight of The Pass in the anime.

The Paperbag Man of Akasabi Village (赤錆村の紙袋男, akasabi mura no kamibukuro otoko)

- Voiced by: Takehiro Murozono (Japanese); Rob Mungle (English)

The culprit of a series of violent murders targeting females that happened 40 years ago at Akasabi Village, a village that gave way to a dam project. At first he targeted women who supported or related to those who supported the dam as he felt it a betrayal for them to turn the village of their ancestors into a lake for profit. Hime and Hiro wandered to the now non-existent village during the witching hour to seek help in fixing their broken-down car. His appearance is that of a fat middle-aged man wearing a singlet and suspender pants, a paper bag with eye holes over his head and a large sickle as weapon. In the anime, he is the leader of the party that opposed the dam project and killed all who supported the project despite age and gender. Unlike the manga version, his anime version has a much larger inhuman build. He left such a strong impression in Hiro and Hime that his form is later used by the dream assailant.

Fly Man (蠅男, hae otoko)
A scientist with a fly head and a human body, he is likely a homage to the monster from the 1958 film The Fly. Trying to sell a biological weapon he developed to Hime, he traps her in a maze he constructed beneath the mansion but fails. He is also responsible for Mikasa's bio-weapon parasite. In Chapter 74 of the manga, it is found out that he used to be human, but to due an accident with a machine he was morphed into a monster.

Frankenstien (フランケンシュタイン, Furankenshutain)
Known as the "Professor", he once served Fuhito and created many things for the Royal Family, including the robot bodyguards and the Duken replica whom he consider all his children. While originally human, he became an emerged brain that uses the mansion as a body to act through.

== Normal Civilians ==
Master

- Voiced by: Akio Katou (Japanese); Andy McAvin (English)

The owner of a café which Sawawa frequents as she loves the parfait the café makes. A moustached, dandy looking man. In the manga, he only appeared in one frame in the background but in the anime he appeared a number of times. His parts largely has nothing to do with the main story.
He harbours feelings for Sawawa, however Sawawa doesn't seem to understand his advances. He treats her to free parfaits, gives her lottery tickets, and even wanted to rename the café "Sawawa", with his gifts becoming more elaborate each time. The name of the café is unknown in the manga, but in the anime it's called "Dandy (伊達男)". Ryu-ryu and Francesca visited the café in the events of a drama CD.

Nozomi Kobuchizawa (小淵沢望, Kobuchizawa Nozomi)

- Voiced by: Naru Kawamoto (Japanese); Greg Ayres (English)

Hiro's friend. A bespectacled otaku-like boy. Called "Buchi" by Hiro. Once stalked Reiri and found out she was a vampire, but that part of his memory was then erased by Reiri. He accompanies Hiro and Princess Sherwood on monster-hunting expeditions as a cameraman, showing some shock at the supernatural happenings, such as thinkinh the guides they hired are in costumes. He often gets Hiro to go with him to investigate rumors of supernatural happenings, which almost always turn out to be true. It is suggested that he has a crush on Francisca. In the anime he also secretly takes pictures of Hime, Sawawa, and Riza. He especially interested in the well-endowed maid Sawawa. He sneaks into the mansion with Yoshida and Murayama to find out the relationship between Hiro and the girls.

Chikao Joujima (城島 親夫, Joujima Chikao)
A security guard who enjoys hunting. He sacrificed himself to let Hime's group and other survivors escape when the supermarket was attacked by zombies, and was killed by Hime before he become a zombie himself. His name was not known until the fifth takubon. Does not appear in the anime.

== Original characters ==
Original characters from the anime and drama CD.

Hiroko (ヒロ子, Hiroko)

- Voiced by: Mayumi Yoshida (Japanese); Serena Varghese (English)

Anime original character. A cat person found by Hiro when she was lying unconscious in the road. She is manipulated by a bell collar. She's very fond of Hiro for saving her. She was sent by Hime's brother to assassinate her, but was foiled when Reiri told Hime only seconds after Hiro intercepted their fight. At the end she ran away after she found out that she was an assassin. She later makes a cameo appearance as one of the people in the stands during Hime's trial.

Frog Ninja (カエル忍者, Kaeru ninja)
Anime original character. A human-sized frog. Same as Hiroko, he is controlled by one of Hime's brothers. Attacked Sherwood but defeated by Francesca.

Yoshida (吉田, Yoshida)

- Voiced by: Kōichi Tōchika (Japanese); David Matranga (English)

Went into Hime's mansion with Kobuchizawa and Murayama. He is interested in Hime and would like to be a slave and tortured by Hime. In the end he is wrapped to a ball with Kobuchizawa and Murayama and thrown away by Ryu-ryu.

Murayama (村山, Murayama)

- Voiced by: Eiji Hanawa (Japanese); Samuel Roman (English)

Went into Hime's mansion with Kobuchizawa and Yoshida. He likes strong women like Riza. In the end he is wrapped to a ball with Kobuchizawa and Yoshida and thrown away by Ryu-ryu.

Aron (アロン, Aron)

- Voiced by: Akiko Kimura (Japanese); Melissa Davis (English)

Anime original character. A famous female assassin of the shark family. Skilled in close combat, and uses retractable sharp fins on her arms as weapons. Was an acquaintance of Riza's brother during the time they were in the army. Although she kissed Riza, she claims that she is only into married women. Attempted to kill Hime under orders from the royalty, but was defeated by Riza. Before dying, she entrusted Lobo's military dog tags to Riza.

Witch (魔女, Majo)

- Voiced by: Aya Hisakawa (Japanese); Rozie Curtis (English)

Anime original character. A witch who lives in the Black Forest. She cares very much about beauty. In belief of the saying that possessing the spirit of the Royalty grants eternal youth, she travels through time and space to find Royalty. She can not stand the smell of gyoza. She holds a compact magic mirror and tried to suck Sherwood into it but in turn sucks Hiro, Riza, Francisca and Ryu-ryu into it too and overloaded the mirror. In the end she was sent away with facial lotion won by Sawawa in the lottery.

Monsters under the Witch (魔女の手下の怪物, majo no teshita no kaibutsu)

- Voiced by: Yasuhiro Mamiya (Japanese); Chris Ayres, Chris Hutchison, Samuel Roman (English)

Anime original characters. The three of them look like dark goblins. They are always hungry, and one of them ate the takoyaki Hiro bought and another ate the jiaozi that was meant to be used to counter the witch.

Shigara (シガラ, Shigara)

- Voiced by: Ryūsei Nakao (Japanese); Greg Ayres (English)

Anime original character, he is a male tanuki race of the Kingdom who turned to vampire hunting after losing his job to feed his family. Despite being clumsy and not very good at his job as he mistook Hime for a vampire, he readily helps those in need. His numerous failed attempts annoy Zeppeli and Reiri with the two forced to staged a show so Shigara can get his bounty and leave.

Duke Dracul (ドラクル, Dorakuru)

- Voiced by: Hōchū Ōtsuka (Japanese); David Matranga (English)

Anime original character filling Kiniski's role in the manga in having Reiri being ostracized from vampire society, Dracul is a vampire in league with Severin. He kidnapped Hiro, but is defeated by the combined effort of Hime, Hiro, Riza and Reiri. He returned to his castle injured where he is killed by Severin while pleading his help.

Judge (裁判長, Saibanchou)

- Voiced by: Daisuke Namikawa (Japanese); Rob Mungle (English)

Anime original character filling the role of the judge from the manga, appearing as a man wearing a large green hat appearing listless and unmotivated in the monster court. But upon accepting Hime's suggestion of a duel, he reveals himself as Hime's father and the current king.

Mo Gura (モ·グラ, Mo Gura)

- Voiced by: Mitsuo Iwata

Drama CD original character. A mole race who runs the travel agency "Underground Tourist". Mobilizing 500,000 moles he laid a railway in a tunnel and started the underground sightseeing train "Mogura Express". He offered Hime and her party a free tour while making failed attempts to kill Hime. This incident with a member of the Royalty, however, acted as an advertisement, and brought customers for his business.
