= List of Ai Yori Aoshi characters =

Ai Yori Aoshi (藍より青し) is a Japanese seinen manga written and illustrated by Kou Fumizuki and serialized from 1998 to 2005 in Hakusensha's Young Animal. The manga and anime series features an extensive cast of characters. The male protagonist is Kaoru Hanabishi, a university student, is the eldest son of Yūji Hanabishi, the head of the Hanabishi Zaibatsu. The female protagonist is Aoi Sakuraba. Aoi is the only daughter of the owner of the Sakuraba Dry Goods Store (later renamed to Sakuraba Department Store). Kaoru's family and Aoi's family had expected for Kaoru to marry Aoi, but after Kaoru walked out, the marriage was canceled.

== Main characters ==
=== Kaoru Hanabishi ===
Kaoru Hanabishi (花菱 薫, Hanabishi Kaoru)
Voiced by: Sōichirō Hoshi (Japanese); Dave Wittenberg (English)
The male protagonist of the series. Kaoru is a fairly average person and he does not fit the mold of the stereotypical male protagonist in most harem anime series; for instance, he does not struggle with his studies, nor is he prone to emotional outbursts. He is generally well liked and is a member of the photography club at Meiritsu University. He resents the Hanabishi clan for their inhumane treatment of himself and his mother, which was due in turn to that clan's disapproval of his parents' relationship. Kaoru's mother and father never married, and he was an illegitimate child. His back is scarred from when he was beaten with a bamboo cane for trying to prevent his grandfather from burning mementos of his dead mother. After exiling himself from the Hanabishi clan, Kaoru has led an average, if not lonely, life. When Aoi arrives, he is, at first, perplexed at her visit, not remembering almost anything prior. The idea of marriage takes him aback, but he very quickly likes, and even looks forward to it. Eventually, Kaoru marries Aoi.

=== Aoi Sakuraba ===
Aoi Sakuraba (桜庭 葵, Sakuraba Aoi)
Voiced by: Ayako Kawasumi (Japanese); Michelle Ruff (English)
The female protagonist of the series. Aoi is a generally demure girl often seen wearing an indigo kimono, and she addresses Kaoru as "Kaoru-sama". Due to her sharp culinary and housekeeping skills, she is seen as an ideal Japanese woman. As a Sakuraba, Aoi was forced into an arranged marriage with Kaoru and because he left the Habanashi, she (having fallen deeply in love with him), chased after him. Unlike other female leads in harem anime, she works to control her jealousy and is generally successful. She is very devoted to Kaoru, however, and will do all in her power to prevent being separated from him. In the beginning, Aoi was willing to warm him when he had a fever, stripping in the process (she made sure he was not looking). When Aoi, Kaoru, and Miyabi moved to the Sakurabas' summer estate the public appearance Miyabi wanted was that Aoi would be the landlady, herself the manager, and Kaoru a tenant. When Tina Foster moved in, Aoi and Miyabi became a real landlord and manager. Aoi has a "bad" habit of clutching things in her sleep. When Kaoru puts an end to the arranged engagement between Aoi and Kaoru's half brother, Aoi decides to abandon her family to be with Kaoru.

=== Tina Foster ===
Tina Foster (ティナ・フォスター, Tina Fosutā)
Voiced by: Satsuki Yukino (Japanese); Wendee Lee (English)
Tina was born in the United States, but spent most of her life in Hakata, a ward in Fukuoka City, Fukuoka Prefecture, Japan. She speaks Japanese fluently but sometime forgets how to speak English. She attends Meiritsu University with Kaoru, and was the one who convinced him to join the photography club, of which she is also a member. She moves into the servant house that Kaoru is staying in because she had no place to stay after returning to Japan from a year-long trip around the world. She has a habit of greeting females by groping and fondling their breasts from behind, which most people find very uncouth (and which frustrates Kaoru to no end). She is loud and outspoken and very protective of Kaoru when it comes to Mayu. She is also very fond of drinking and has an enormous capacity for alcohol... but still pays the inevitable price in hangovers. She has a white pet ferret, named Uzume, which most of the cast finds very cute, except, initially, for Miyabi. She is afraid of dark places.
She eventually moves to the United States for four years, only to return to Japan to visit the rest of her friends.

=== Miyabi Kagurazaki ===
Miyabi Kagurazaki (神楽崎 雅, Kagurazaki Miyabi)
Voiced by: Akiko Hiramatsu (Japanese); Lia Sargent (English)
Aoi's appointed guardian and caretaker, she spent most of her life looking after Aoi and helping in her upbringing. She is also very active in the running of the Sakuraba Department Store. After Miyabi's parents are killed in a car accident, Aoi's mother raised Miyabi to be Aoi's caretaker. Miyabi soon becomes the manager of the Sakuraba summer house. Despite her initial misgivings about Kaoru and his friends, she eventually accepts him because of the feelings that Aoi and Kaoru have for each other. Four years later, Miyabi has been adopted by the Sakurabas. She is also a manager of a department store owned by the Sakurabas.

=== Taeko Minazuki ===
Taeko Minazuki (水無月 妙子, Minazuki Taeko)
Voiced by: Kaori Mizuhashi (Japanese); Philece Sampler (English)
Taeko is a new member of the Meiritsu University photography club and eventually moves into the Sakuraba summer house as the housekeeper after being relieved of her previous housekeeping job. Her most prominent features are her very large breasts (that never stop growing) and her clumsiness. She was so clumsy that Aoi had to convince Miyabi to hire her, as she had a tendency to break a lot of valuable objects, but she tries to do her best. Tina commends Taeko for her effort and tells her that she is getting better. Taeko explains that the reason she wants to be a housekeeper so badly is because when she was very young, her father died and her mother had to raise her as a single parent. Taeko's mother was very proficient at keeping house, and Taeko wishes to achieve the same proficiency that her mother had. She also develops feelings for Kaoru as the series progresses. She likes to put chocolate in all the food she makes, even in fish. In an episode of Ai yori Aoshi: Enishi it is indicated that Taeko has an interest in the supernatural as well as training as a miko. Four years later, Taeko works at the department store where Miyabi is the manager.

=== Mayu Miyuki ===
Mayu Miyuki (美幸 繭, Miyuki Mayu)
Voiced by: Sayaka Narita (Japanese); Karen Strassman (English)
Something of a prodigy, Mayu attends the same college as "Hanabishi-sama" purely by accident. Meiritsu University was chosen for her by her father and she initially thought poorly of it. She is in love with Kaoru because he cheered her up at a party when she was 12 years old. At that time, Mayu's parents informed her that they would be missing her 12th birthday because of business overseas. They gave her a stuffed rabbit as a gift because her father has made a habit of giving her stuffed toy animals as gifts for years. Mayu's parents had been holding a party for their business partners, and no matter what Mayu said or did, her parents simply did not have the time for her. Dismayed, Mayu ran off into the woods, bumping into Kaoru and dropping her rabbit as she fled. Kaoru followed her and tried to cheer her up, but she exclaimed that her parents did not take care of her at all, and that they also did not love her. Kaoru then uses the rabbit (which he named "Ussaa", a contraction of usagi, the Japanese word for "rabbit") as a puppet to cheer up Mayu, telling her that her parents do love her very much, and that even if they do not pay as much attention to her as they should, it is better than having no parents at all, like himself. This left a significant impact on Mayu, and she kept and cherished Ussaa to the current day. Mayu is still very lonely, because her parents are always busy working. She tries as hard as she can to do things that would make Kaoru happy, such as learning how to cook from Aoi so she could make lunch for him.
Mayu shares a rivalry with Tina, whom she considers uncouth, and whose presence she cannot stand. The two characters are opposites in many ways. Where Mayu is serious, Tina is playful. Where Mayu is uncharacteristically open in her unrealistic desire for Kaoru, Tina is uncharacteristically shy in her (almost) reciprocated love of Kaoru. Where Tina is an American who embraces Japanese culture, Mayu is Japanese and embraces Western culture. When Tina accidentally bumped into her during their first meeting, Mayu reprimanded her in English, while the out-of-practice Tina struggled to recall an appropriate retort in her native language. Even their introductions to Kaoru are mirror images of one another. Kaoru did much to lift Mayu out of her loneliness, while Tina lifted Kaoru out of his own loneliness and apathy following his renouncement of the Hanabishi clan. Four years later, Mayu was shown to have grown into a beautiful woman (possibly another nod to her given name), living in England, although she still bickers with Tina when they meet. She has not, however, given up on Kaoru, and visits roughly once a month, causing Aoi some irritation.

=== Chika Minazuki ===
Chika Minazuki (水無月 ちか, Minazuki Chika)
Voiced by: Haruko Momoi (Japanese); Kari Wahlgren (credited as Kay Jensen) (English)
Taeko's younger cousin and a high school student when she is first introduced. During the summer she spends most of her time working in a cafe down by the beach. Because of this, she is very tanned except for tan lines caused by her swimsuits. She notices that Taeko has a crush on Kaoru and spends a lot of time trying to fix the two of them up. She occasionally has mild feelings for Kaoru as the series progresses, but for the most part, looks up to him as an older brother.
Four years later, Chika is at Meiritsu University alongside Chizuru and Natsuki. Chika has grown her hair longer and no longer wears it in two ponytails.

=== Uzume ===
Uzume (ウズメ)
Voiced by: Yuka Inokuchi (Japanese); Kaeko Sakamoto (English)
The pet ferret purchased by Tina but eventually becomes attached to the one person who initially rejected having anything to do with it, Miyabi. Its arrival at the 'boarding house' was predictably chaotic, with its accidentally destructive behavior causing Miyabi to develop an intense dislike for it, partly because in the episode it is learned that the tough-as-nails Miyabi is secretly afraid of insects, and Uzume has a tendency to present them, cat-like, as presents to her. Her anger at this discovery of her secret vulnerability being made by the other residents is short-circuited by being the only one who can save the animal's life when it becomes trapped and is in danger of dying. The name Uzume was derived from Ame-no-Uzume, the goddess from Japanese mythology who was responsible for luring Amaterasu out of the Heavenly Cave.

== Minor characters ==
=== Chizuru Aizawa ===
Chizuru Aizawa (相澤 千鶴, Aizawa Chizuru)
Voiced by: Mamiko Noto (Japanese); Midge Mayes (English)
One of Chika's good friends in high school, who took swimming lessons from Tina along with her schoolmates. She is very afraid of swimming, but managed to overcome her fear and learned how to swim. She is the shy one of Chika's group, often overwhelmed by adult matters (of the trio, her mind is the most prone to perverted thoughts) and prone to constant blushing and the occasional fainting fit.

=== Natsuki Komiya ===
Natsuki Komiya (小宮 夏樹, Komiya Natsuki)
Voiced by: Kimiko Koyama (Japanese); Julie Ann Taylor (English)
Another of Chika's good friends in high school. She considers Chika to be her chief rival and is often jealous of the love-love relationship that she and Chizuru assume Chika to have with Kaoru. She is about the only person who can beat Chika at swimming besides Tina Foster (who nicknames her "Nakki").

=== Ruka Saionji ===
Ruka Saionji (西園寺琉伽, Saionji Ruka)
Voiced by: Kenyū Horiuchi (Japanese); Kirk Thornton (English)
Mayu's attendant, charged by Mayu's parents with seeing that she attends school and does the other things they want her to do.

=== Suzuki ===
Suzuki (鈴木)
Voiced by: Kazuya Nakai (Japanese); Lex Lang (English)
Kaoru's and Taeko's senpai, and President of Meiritsu University's Photography Club. He is noted for his love of trains and locomotives.

=== Satō ===
Satō (佐藤)
Voiced by: Makoto Higo (Japanese); Kirk Thornton (English)
Kaoru's and Taeko's senpai, and Vice President of Meiritsu University's Photography Club. He is noted for his love of idols (especially female ones).
