= List of Ai Yori Aoshi episodes =

Ai Yori Aoshi, a manga series by Kou Fumizuki, was adapted into two anime television series by J.C.Staff directed by Masami Shimoda. Broadcast on Fuji TV, the first season premiered on April 10, 2002, and aired weekly until its conclusion on September 25, 2002, spanning twenty-four episodes. Most of the music for the series was composed by Toshio Masuda. A second, twelve-episode anime television series titled Ai Yori Aoshi: Enishi (藍より青し ～縁～) was broadcast on Fuji TV premiering in October 2003 and running weekly until its conclusion on December 28, 2003. In addition to the two seasons, two bonus episodes were also made, the first of which appeared in season one, titled "Speaking of Dreams", and shows the character's past and current dreams for the future. The second bonus episode (from season two) is a sixteen-minute prelude to the series. It takes place some months before the first episode of Ai Yori Aoshi.

Three pieces of theme music are used in the first season: one opening theme and two ending themes. The opening theme, titled "Towa no Hana" (永遠の花; lit. Eternal Flower), is performed by Yoko Ishida. The ending theme is "Na mo Shirenu Hana" (名も知れぬ花; lit. Unknown Flower) performed by The Indigo. The 18th episode's ending theme is "I'll Be Home" performed by Satsuki Yukino.

The second season used three pieces of theme music: one opening theme and two ending themes. The opening theme, "Takaramono" (たからもの; lit. Treasure) is once again performed by Yoko Ishida. The ending themes, "I Do!" and "Presence", are both performed by The Indigo.

In Japan, the first season was released across eight Region 2 DVD compilation volumes by Geneon Entertainment, with six compilations consisting of the second season's DVD release. Geneon licensed both seasons of the anime adaptation for English-language dubbed released in North America. The first season was released across five Region 1 DVD compilation volumes between February 23, 2003, and October 14, 2003. A DVD box set compiling all five volumes was later released by Geneon.

The second season of the anime series was released across three Region 1 DVD compilation volumes between July 6, 2004, and November 9, 2004. A DVD box set compiling all three volumes and DVDs released for the first season was released by Geneon on April 17, 2007.

== Episode list ==
=== Ai Yori Yoshi (2002) ===
No.	Title	Original release date
1	"Fate"; Transliteration: "Enishi" (Japanese: 縁)	April 10, 2002
2	"Supper"; Transliteration: "Yūge" (Japanese: 夕餉)	April 17, 2002
3	"Separation"; Transliteration: "Wakare" (Japanese: 別離)	April 24, 2002
4	"Living Together"; Transliteration: "Dōsei" (Japanese: 同棲)	May 1, 2002
5	"Old Friend"; Transliteration: "Hōyū" (Japanese: 朋友)	May 8, 2002
6	"Family Tradition"; Transliteration: "Kadō" (Japanese: 家道)	May 22, 2002
7	"Spiritual Illusion"; Transliteration: "Gen'yō" (Japanese: 幻妖)	May 29, 2002
8	"Cherished Treasure"; Transliteration: "Aigan" (Japanese: 愛玩)	June 5, 2002
9	"One Night"; Transliteration: "Hitoyo" (Japanese: 一夜)	June 12, 2002
10	"Place of Learning"; Transliteration: "Manabiya" (Japanese: 学舎)	June 19, 2002
11	"Debutante"; Transliteration: "Shijo" (Japanese: 子女)	June 26, 2002
12	"Kiss"; Transliteration: "Seppun" (Japanese: 接吻)	July 3, 2002
13	"Star Festival"; Transliteration: "Hoshimatsuri" (Japanese: 星祭)	July 10, 2002
14	"Servant"; Transliteration: "Makanai" (Japanese: 賄)	July 31, 2002
15	"Feelings of the Heart"; Transliteration: "Kyōkai" (Japanese: 胸懐)	August 7, 2002
16	"Shores"; Transliteration: "Nagisa" (Japanese: 渚)	August 14, 2002
17	"Waves"; Transliteration: "Sazanami" (Japanese: 漣)	August 21, 2002
18	"Bedsharing"; Transliteration: "Dōkin" (Japanese: 同衾)	August 28, 2002
19	"Lap Pillow"; Transliteration: "Hizamakura" (Japanese: 膝枕)	September 4, 2002
20	"Cure"; Transliteration: "Iyashi" (Japanese: 癒)	September 11, 2002
21	"Influenza"; Transliteration: "Fūki" (Japanese: 風気)	September 18, 2002
22	"Going Home"; Transliteration: "Kisei" (Japanese: 帰省)	September 25, 2002
23	"Determination"; Transliteration: "Ketsui" (Japanese: 決意)	October 2, 2002
24	"Aoi"; Transliteration: "Aoi" (Japanese: 葵)	October 9, 2002
B	"Speaking of Dreams"	October 16, 2002
"Speaking of Dreams" is a five-minute bonus episode that shows what the characters' past and current dreams for the future are.

=== Ai Yori Aoshi Enishi (2003) ===
No.	Title	Original release date
0	"Beautiful Snow"; Transliteration: "Miyuki" (Japanese: 美雪)	October 5, 2003
1	"Spring Blossom"; Transliteration: "Ōshun" (Japanese: 桜春)	October 12, 2003
2	"Friends"; Transliteration: "Tomogaki" (Japanese: 友垣)	October 19, 2003
3	"Tennis"; Transliteration: "Teikyū" (Japanese: 庭球)	October 26, 2003
4	"Phantom"; Transliteration: "Mononoke" (Japanese: 怪)	November 2, 2003
5	"Piano"; Transliteration: "Yōkin" (Japanese: 洋琴)	November 8, 2003
6	"Journey"; Transliteration: "Dōtei" (Japanese: 道程)	November 15, 2003
7	"Summer Resort"; Transliteration: "Hisho" (Japanese: 避暑)	November 22, 2003
8	"Fish and Water"; Transliteration: "Suigyo" (Japanese: 水魚)	November 29, 2003
9	"White"; Transliteration: "Shirotae" (Japanese: 白妙)	December 6, 2003
10	"Bathrobe"; Transliteration: "Yukatabira" (Japanese: 湯帷子)	December 13, 2003
11	"Moonlight"; Transliteration: "Gekkō" (Japanese: 月光)	December 20, 2003
12	"Bonds"; Transliteration: "Kizuna" (Japanese: 絆)	December 27, 2003
