= List of Ai Yori Aoshi chapters =

The cover of Ai Yori Aoshi volume 1 as released by Hakusensha on May 28, 1999, in Japan.

The chapters of the manga series Ai Yori Aoshi are written and illustrated by Kou Fumizuki, and was serialized in 1998 in Hakusensha's Young Animal magazine. The first volume was published and released in Japan by Hakusensha on May 28, 1999, with 17 volumes the last was released on December 20, 2005. In English the series was released by Tokyopop. Book one was released in January 2004 with the last book being released in October 2007.

The series has also been licensed in Europe (Non English Releases), Asia, and Middle America. In Europe, the series was licensed in French by Pika Édition, in German by EMA, and in Spanish by Norma Editorial. For Asia the series was licensed in Chinese by Jonesky, in Korean by Daiwon CI, and in Russian by Sakura Press. In Middle America the series has been published in Mexico by Grupo Editorial Vid.

Besides sharing many similarities in the storyline with the two anime series, the manga also expands on parts not covered in the anime, such as Kaoru's younger brother, and Miyabi's past.

== Volume list ==
No.	Original release date	Original ISBN	English release date	English ISBN
1	May 28, 1999	978-4-592-13371-1	January 6, 2004	978-1-59182-645-3
01. "Reason"; 02. "The Unwedded Couple"; 03. "Futon"; 04. "Dinner"; 05. "The Bathroom"; 06. "Refusal"; 07. "Don't Leave"; 08. "Meeting"; 09. "Promise"; 10. "Journey Restarted"
2	December 17, 1999	978-4-592-13372-8	March 9, 2004	978-1-59182-646-0
11. "Living Together"; 12. "Friend"; 13. "Landlady"; 14. "Vacation"; 15. "Attracting Demon"; 16. "The Way Of The Home"; 17. "School Festival"; 18. "Wounds"; 19. "Opportunity"
3	May 29, 2000	978-4-592-13373-5	May 4, 2004	978-1-59182-647-7
20. "Deep in the Heart"; 21. "Christmas"; 22. "New Year's Eve"; 23. "Sanchou, First Three of the New Year"; 24. "Diligent Study"; 25. "Warm Days"; 26. "Fondness"; 27. "Hollyhock"; 28. "Spring and Autumn"; 29. "The Heart"
4	October 27, 2000	978-4-592-13374-2	July 6, 2004	978-1-59182-648-4
30. "Return"; 31. "Cocoon"; 32. "Solitude"; 33. "Puppet"; 34. "Kiss"; 35. "Secret Key"; 36. "Fisherman"; 37. "Love"; 38. "Chanel Marker"
5	March 29, 2001	978-4-592-13375-9	September 14, 2004	978-1-59182-649-1
39. "Azure"; 40. "Serenade"; 41. "Sharing a Bed"; 41.5. "Sun Goddess"; 42. "Cold Wind"; 43. "Deep Snow"; 44. "Lingerering Snow"; 45. "Emperor's Meal"; 46. "Cook"
6	July 27, 2001	978-4-592-13376-6	November 9, 2004	978-1-59182-650-7
47. "Homecoming"; 48. "Loyalty"; 49. "Marriage"; 50. "Kindly Face"; 51. "Mist"; 52. "Determination"; 53. "The Road Home"; 53.5. "Idlness"; 53.6. "Charge"; 54. "Diet"
7	November 29, 2001	978-4-592-13377-3	January 11, 2005	978-1-59532-370-5
55. "Swim Practice"; 56. "Water's Edge"; 57. "Crisis"; 58. "Moon Goddess"; 59. "Festival Music"; 60. "Summer Gift"; 61. "Lap Pillow"; 61.5. "Vengeful Spirit"; 61.6. "Dream Story"
8	March 29, 2002	978-4-592-13378-0	March 8, 2005	978-1-59532-371-2
61.7. "Gentle Woman"; 62. "All Day"; 63. "Begonia"; 63.5. "Piano"; 64. "Festival Eve"; 65. "Test"; 66. "Distance"; 67. "Sojourn"; 68. "Karma"
9	July 29, 2002	978-4-592-13379-7	June 7, 2005	978-1-59532-372-9
68.5. "Thousand Generation-Old Sugar"; 69. "Floral Mat"; 70. "Homesickness"; 71. "Illicit Love"; 72. "Promise"; 72.5. "Entwined"; 73. "Tennis"; 74. "Bathrobe"; 75. "Blue Eyes"
10	November 29, 2002	978-4-592-13440-4	September 13, 2005	978-1-59532-373-6
76. "Friends"; 77. "White Cloth"; 78. "In Love"; 79. "Pain"; 80. "Endless Night"; 81. "Boat"; 82. "Deep Madness"; 83. "Grave"; 84. "Tomorrow"
11	May 29, 2003	978-4-592-13441-1	December 13, 2005	978-1-59532-374-3
85. "A Thousand Years" (千秋, "Senshuu"); 86. "Dregs" (澱, "Ori"); 87. "Bloodlines" (骨肉, "Kotsuniku"); 88. "Infatuation" (牽連, "Kenren"); 89. "Confidant" (合口, "Aikuchi"); 90. "Awaited" (マチウド, "Machiudo"); 91. "Happy Circle" (円居, "Madoi"); 92. "Smile" (微笑み, "Hohoemi"); 93. "Gradual Progress" (漸進, "Zenshin")
12	November 28, 2003	978-4-592-13442-8	March 7, 2006	978-1-59532-375-0
94. "Boisterous" (喧しい, "Kamabisushii"); 95. "Cradle" (揺籃, "Youran"); 96. "Deep Love" (切愛, "Setsuai"); 97. "Young Girls" (早乙女, "Saotome"); 98. "Comrades" (輩, "Tomogara"); 98. "Fish and Water" (スイギョ, "Suigyo"); 100. "Flowers Fallen on the Water" (落花 流水, "Rakka Ryuusui"); 101. "Debt of Gratitude" (恩義, "Ongi"); 102. "Noble Sisters" (連枝, "Renshi")
13	March 29, 2004	978-4-592-13443-5	June 13, 2006	978-1-59532-376-7
103. "Focus" (焦点, "Shouten"); 104. "Bathing Together" (層湯, "Souyu"); 105. "Secret Hot Spring" (秘湯, "Hitou"); 106. "Disgust" (虫酸, "Mushizu"); 107. "Cowardice" (おく病, "Okubyou"); 108. "True Feelings" (心根, "Kokorone"); 109. "Play" (遊戯, "Yuugi"); 110. "Alma Mater" (母校, "Bokou"); 111. "Treasure Box" (宝箱, "Takarabako")
14	September 29, 2004	978-4-592-13444-2	October 10, 2006	978-1-59816-201-1
112. "Retrospect" (遡上, "Sojou"); 113. "Monologue" (独白, "Dokuhaku"); 114. "Dear Friend" (チイン, "Chi'in"); 115. "Bad Friend" (悪友, "Akuyuu"); 116. "Hopes" (庶幾, "Shoki"); 117. "Taking Leave" (起居来, "Kikyorai"); 118. "Good Will" (誼, "Yoshimi"); 118.5. "First Love" (初恋, "Hatsukoi")
15	February 28, 2005	978-4-592-13445-9	February 13, 2007	978-1-59816-202-8
119. "I'm All Right" (大丈夫, "Daijoubu"); 120. "Third Wheel" (三者, "Sansha"); 121. "Confession" (告白, "Kokuhaku"); 122. "Urgent Notice" (急告, "Kyuukoku"); 123. "Unexpected Meeting" (介甲, "Kaikou"); 124. "Rebuke" (踏み絵, "Fumie"); 125. "Curse" (呪縛, "Jubaku"); 126. "Old Grudge" (宿意, "Shukui"); 126.5. "Childhood Friend" (幼なじみ, "Osananajimi")
16	August 28, 2005	978-4-592-13446-6	June 13, 2007	978-1-59816-838-9
127. "Sitting and Waiting" (居待ち, "Imachi"); 128. "Resemblance" (相似, "Souji"); 129. "Transience" (ウタカ, "Utaka"); 130. "Lost Love" (失恋, "Shitsuren"); 131. "Abandonment" (抛擲, "Houteki"); 132. "Remembrance" (追懐, "Tsuikai"); 133. "Disownment" (義絶, "Gizetsu"); 133.5. "Language of Flower" (花言葉, "Hanakotoba")
17	December 20, 2005	978-4-592-13447-3	October 13, 2007	978-1-59816-839-6
134. "Fatal Flaw" (瓦解, "Gakai"); 135. "Cherished Hope" (素懐, "Sokai"); 136. "Pair" (対, "Tsui"); 137. "Rustling of Clothes" (衣摺れ, "Kinuzure"); 138. "Bond" (絆, "Kizuna"); 139. "Bluer" (出藍, "Shutsuran"); 140. "Farewell Gift" (餞, "Hanamuke"); 140.5. "True Blue" (卵状, "Ranjou")
