= Sōichirō Hoshi =

Japanese voice actor and singer (born 1972)

- 保志 総一朗
- Born: May 30, 1972 (age 54); Aizuwakamatsu, Fukushima, Japan
- Other name: Takeshi Aiba (相庭 剛志)
- Occupations: Voice actor; singer
- Years active: 1995–present
- Agent: Arts Vision
- Notable work: Digimon Savers as Masaru Daimon Higurashi When They Cry as Keiichi Maebara Persona 5 as Goro Akechi
- Website: king-cr.jp/artist/hoshi/

Sōichirō Hoshi (保志 総一朗, Hoshi Sōichirō; born May 30, 1972) is a Japanese voice actor and singer affiliated with Arts Vision. Some of his major anime roles include Son Goku in Saiyuki, Kira Yamato in Mobile Suit Gundam Seed, Mobile Suit Gundam Seed Destiny & Mobile Suit Gundam Seed Freedom, Kazuki Fuuchouin in GetBackers, Masaru Daimon in Digimon Savers, Kaoru Hanabishi in Ai Yori Aoshi, and Tomoki Sakurai in Heaven's Lost Property. In video game franchises he voices Sanada Yukimura in Sengoku Basara, Keiichi Maebara in Higurashi When They Cry, Kilik in Soulcalibur, and various characters in Haruka: Beyond the Stream of Time. He partially voices Shirogane Takeru in the Muv-Luv series. Hoshi was also known for his voice roles of villains as Goro Akechi from Persona 5, Death Gun from Sword Art Online, and Lio Shirazumi in The Garden of Sinners, and Sentarō Miya in Kono Oto Tomare! Sounds of Life.

For his work, Hoshi has been awarded the voice acting award in the Anime Grand Prix between 2005 and 2006. At the 1st Seiyu Awards, Hoshi was a nominee in the category "Best Actors in supporting roles" for his role as Kira Yamato in Mobile Suit Gundam SEED Destiny. Hoshi won the 19th Seiyu Awards for Kei Tomiyama Award.

== Filmography ==
=== Anime ===
List of voice performances in anime
Year	Title	Role	Notes	Source(s)
1993	Nintama Rantaro	Senzo Tachibana		
1994	Dirty Pair Flash		OVA	
1995	Bit the Cupid	modem		
1995	Mojacko	Student		
1996	Case Closed	Tamanosuke Ito		
1996	Brave Command Dagwon	Broadcasting staff		
1996	Those Who Hunt Elves	Waiter / Tom		
1997	Princess Rouge	Regulus	OVA	
1997	Fair, then Partly Piggy	Boy (boy H)		
1998	Ginga Hyōryū Vifam 13	Roddy Shuffle		
1998	Lost Universe	Kain Blueriver		
1998	DT Eightron	Shu		
1998	Very Private Lesson (ja:教科書にないッ!, Kyokasho ni ai)	Kusakabe	OVA	
1998	Marvelous Melmo	touch	Renewal edition	
1998	St. Luminous Mission High School	Ryuzo Tanami		
1998	Steam Detectives	Narutaki		
1999	Burst Ball Barrage!! Super B-Daman	Tsuyoshi Okura		
1999	Space Pirate Mito series	Hikarikoku Aoi	Also Two Queens	
1999	To Heart	Masashi Sato		
1999	Gokudo	Issa		
1999	I'm Gonna Be An Angel!	Saiki		
1999	Cyborg Kuro-chan	Hirosue		
1999	Jibaku-kun	John		
1999	Infinite Ryvius	Yuki Aiba		
1999	We Know You, Moonlight Mask-kun!	Kenta Ozeki		
2000	Gensomaden Saiyuki	Son Goku	TV series	
2000	Banner of the Stars	Dufiel		
2000	Dinozaurs	Swordsaurus		
2000	Argento Soma	Ryu Soma, Takuto Kaneshiro		
2000	Hiwou War Chronicles	Hidetaro		
2001	Tales of Eternia	Keele Zeibel		
2001	Comic Party	Masashi Sato		
2001	Haré + Guu	Seiichi Tachibana		
2001	Cosmo Warrior Zero	Shizuo Ishikura		
2001–02	One: Kagayaku Kisetsu e	Ice Shun	OVA	
2001	Prince of Tennis	Gakuto Mukahi		
2001	Angelic Layer	Ohjiro Mihara		
2001	Rave Master	Lucia Raregroove		
2001	s-CRY-ed	Kazuma		
2001	Tokyo Underground	Ginnosuke Isuzu		
2002	Haruka: Beyond the Stream of Time: Ajisai Yumegatari	Eisen	OVA	
2002	Tokyo Mew Mew	Seiji Aizawa		
2002–05	Wagamama Fairy: Mirumo de Pon!	Kaoru Matsutake		
2002–03	Ai Yori Aoshi series	Kaoru Hanabishi	Also Edge	
2002	.hack//Liminality	Masaya Makino		
2002	Samurai Deeper Kyo	Akira		
2002	Mobile Suit Gundam Seed	Kira Yamato		[$5000000000000000]
2002	Piano	Takizawa		
2002	Getbackers	Kazuki Fuuchouin		
2002	Kikou Sennyo Rouran ja:奇鋼仙女ロウラン	Yamato Mikogami		
2002	Melody of Oblivion	Skyblue		
2002	Please Teacher!	Kei Kusanagi		
2003	.hack//Legend of the Twilight	Reki		
2003	Harukanaru Toki no Naka de 2: Shiroki Ryuu no Miko	Minamoto no Motomi	OVA	
2003	Pluster World	Mashanta		
2003	Croket!	Risotto / Susie Nick		
2003	Please Twins!	Kei Kusanagi		
2003	Planetes	Kyutaro Hoshino		
2003	Tactics	Sugino		
2003	Beyblade G-Revolution	Brooklyn		
2004–05	Kaiketsu Zorori series	Arthur	2nd TV series, also Majime ni Fumajime	
2003	Saiyuuki Reload	Son Goku	TV series	
2004	Saiyuki Reload Gunlock	Son Goku	TV series	
2004	To Heart: Remember My Memories	Masashi Sato		
2004	Haruka: Beyond the Stream of Time	Eisen	TV series	
2004	Mobile Suit Gundam Seed Destiny	Kira Yamato		
2004	Black Jack	Runan / Tsukuda doctor		
2004–06	Meine Liebe series	Camus	Also Wieder	
2004	Akane Maniax	Takeru Shirogane	OVA	
2004	Gun Sword	Michael Garret		
2004	Tenjo Tenge	Souichiro Nagi		
2005	Xenosaga: The Animation	chaos		
2005	Sukisho	Sunao Fujimori, Ran		
2005	Battle B-Daman: Fire Spirits!	Akyuras / Aztec Kamen		
2005	Märchen Awakens Romance	Alviss		
2005	Sengoku Heroes Shinshaku Sanada Ten Braves ja:新釈 戦国英雄伝説 眞田十勇士 The Animation	Sarutobi Sasuke		
2005	The Law of Ueki	Seiichiro Sano		
2006	Digimon Savers	Masaru Daimon		
2006–21	Higurashi When They Cry series	Keiichi Maebara	TV series and OVAs	
2006	Princess Princess	Akira Sakamoto		
2006	Demashita! Powerpuff Girls Z	Brick		
2006	Kirarin Revolution	Seiji Hiwatari		
2006	Strain: Strategic Armored Infantry	Carrisford Radofrics		
2007–09	Major	Uchiyama, Mukaiyama	TV series 3-5	
2007	Saiyuki Reload: Burial	Son Goku	OVA	
2007–11	Bakugan Battle Brawlers series	Masquerade, Joe Brown, Prince Hydron, Lumagrowl	Seasons 1-3	
2007	Shining Tears X Wind	Souma Akizuki, Zero		
2007	Bokurano	Masaru Kodaka		
2007	Good Luck! Ninomiya-kun	Taichi Inoue		
2007	Ghost Hound	Makoto Ōgami		
2007	Harukanaru Toki no Naka de 3: Kurenai no Tsuki	Taira no Atsumori		
2008	Macross Frontier	Brera Sterne		
2008	Code Geass: Lelouch of the Rebellion R2	Gino Weinberg		
2008	Vampire Knight series	Senri Shiki	Also Guilty	
2008–09	My-Otome 0~S.ifr~	Shiro	OVA	
2008	Hell Girl Three Vessels	Takeru Yukawa		
2008	Shugo Chara! Doki	Rento Sōma		
2008	Tytania	Bal'ami Tytania		
2008	Sgt. Frog	Freezer		
2009–10	Sengoki Basara series	Sanada Yukimura		
2009	Phantom: Requiem for the Phantom	Toru Shiga		
2009	Heaven's Lost Property series	Tomoki Sakurai	Also Forte	
2010	Harukanaru Toki no Naka de 3 ~Owari Naki Unmei~	Taira no Atsumori		
2010	The Betrayal Knows My Name	Yuki Sakurai/Gioh		
2010–11	Nura: Rise of the Yokai Clan	Mezumaru	Also Demon Capital	
2010	Starry Sky	Kanakubo Homare		
2011	Saiyuki Gaiden	Son Goku	OVA	
2011	Chibi Devi!	Principal		
2012	New Prince of Tennis	Gakuto Mukahi		
2012–19	Symphogear series	Shinji Ogawa	Also G, GX, AXZ, and XV	
2012	The Knight in the Area	Michael Honda		
2012–15	Kuroko's Basketball series	Yukio Kasamatsu		
2012	Cardfight!! Vanguard: Asia Circuit	Lizard		
2012–14	Love, Chunibyo & Other Delusions series	Makoto Isshiki		
2012	Btooom!	Tetsuo Wakamoto		
2013	Karneval	Karoku		
2013	Saiyuki Gaiden: Kouga no Shou	Son Goku	OVA	
2013	Arata: The Legend	Yorunami		
2013	Fantasista Doll	The Rafflesia Man		
2013–15	Ace of Diamond series	Katsuyuki Shirakawa		
2013	Naruto Shippuden	Yashamaru		
2014	The Pilot's Love Song	Fausto Fidel Melze		
2014	Broken Blade	Rygart Arrow		
2014	Mekaku City Actors	Kōsuke Seto		
2014	Sword Art Online II	Death Gun		
2014	Sengoku Basara: End of Judgement	Sanada Yukimura		
2014–15	Shonen Hollywood series	Daichi Hirosawa	Also Holly Stage for 50	
2015	The Transformers: Mystery of Convoy series	Tracks, Sanda Yukimura	Also Saranaru Ninkimono e no Mich	
2015	Gunslinger Stratos	Ryō Kusakage		
2015	Lance N' Masques	Lee Kiruha		
2015	One-Punch Man	Inazu Max		
2016	Future Card Buddyfight Triple D	Dr. Gara		
2016	Rewrite	Mido		
2016	Nanbaka	Samon Goku		
2016	D.Gray-man Hallow	Wisely		
2016	Cute High Earth Defense Club Love!	Tsukuna Ouso		
2017	Star-Myu: High School Star Musical 2	Taiga Futaba		
2017	My Hero Academia	Yoichi Shigaraki		
2017	Clean Freak! Aoyama-kun	Kazuma Sakai		
2017	Tsuredure Children	Tomomichi Motoyama		
2017	Saiyuki Reload Blast	Son Goku	TV series	
2018	Persona 5: The Animation	Goro Akechi		
2018	Gakuen Basara	Sanada Yukimura		
2019	Ace of Diamond Act II	Katsuyuki Shirakawa		
2019	Kono Oto Tomare! Sounds of Life	Sentarō Miya		
2019	Demon Slayer: Kimetsu no Yaiba	Wakuraba		
2019	Actors: Songs Connection	Hinata Mitsutsuka		
2020	IDOLiSH7 Second Beat!	Momose Sunohara		
2022	Saiyuki Reload: Zeroin	Son Goku	TV series	
2023	Bleach: Thousand-Year Blood War	Nianzol	TV series	
2024	Ishura	Dakai the Magpie		

=== Film ===
List of voice performances in feature films
Year	Title	Role	Notes	Source(s)
1996	Crayon Shin-chan: Adventure in Henderland	Gōman		
1998	Perfect Blue	Midori		
2000	Doraemon: Nobita and the Legend of the Sun King	Kakao		
2001	Saiyuki: Requiem	Son Goku		
2006	Harukanaru Toki no Naka de: Maihitoyo	Eisen		
2007	The Garden of Sinners: A Study in Murder – Part 1	Lio Shirazumi	Kara no Kyōkai movie 1	
2008	The Garden of Sinners: The Hollow Shrine	Lio Shirazumi	Kara no Kyōkai movie 4	
2008	The Garden of Sinners: Oblivion Recording	Lio Shirazumi	Kara no Kyōkai movie 6	
2009	Naruto Shippūden 3: Inheritors of the Will of Fire	Hiruko		
2009	The Garden of Sinners: A Study in Murder – Part 2	Lio Shirazumi	Kara no Kyōkai movie 7	
2009	Macross Frontier: Itsuwari no Utahime	Brera Sterne		
2011	Macross Frontier: Sayonara no Tsubasa	Brera Sterne		
2011	Sengoku Basara: The Last Party	Sanada Yukimura		
2011	Heaven's Lost Property the Movie: The Angeloid of Clockwork	Tomoki Sakurai		
2011	Alice in the Country of Hearts	Pierce Villiers		
2011	The Prince of Tennis: Tennis no Ouji-sama Eikoku-shiki Teikyū-jō Kessen!	Muko Takehito		
2013	Takanashi Rikka Kai: Gekijō-ban Chūnibyō demo Koi ga Shitai!	Makoto Isshiki		
2014	Sora no Otoshimono Final: Eternal My Master	Tomoki Sakurai		
2018	Love, Chunibyo & Other Delusions! Take on Me	Makoto Isshiki		
2024	Mobile Suit Gundam SEED Freedom	Kira Yamato		
2024	Nintama Rantarō: Invincible Master of the Dokutake Ninja	Senzo Tachibana		

=== Video games ===
List of voice performances in video games
Year	Title	Role	Notes	Source(s)
1997	Super Gem Fighter Mini Mix; Also Super Puzzle Fighter	Ryu	Arcade	
1997	Dragoon Machine Lore	Genoa Karejinaru	PS1/PS2	
1998–present	Soulcalibur series	Kilik		
1999	To Heart	Masashi Sato	PS1/PS2	
1999	Ace Combat 3: Electrosphere	Erich Jaeger	PS1/PS2	
2000–11	Haruka: Beyond the Stream of Time series	Eisen, Minamoto no Motomi, Taira no Atsumori, Hiko Futsu, Xuanwu		
2000	Brigandine: Grand Edition	Lance	PS1/PS2	
2000	Sukisho series	Sunao Fujimori	Also 2004 remakes	
2000	Skies of Arcadia	Enrique	DC	
2000	Tales of Eternia	Keele Zeibel	PS1/PSP	
2002	Grandia Xtreme	Tito	PS1/PS2	
2002–06	Xenosaga series	chaos	PS1/PS2	
2002	Ever 17: The Out of Infinity	Takeshi Kuranari		
2002	Rave Master: Special Attack Force	Lucia rare Globe	PS1/PS2	
2002–04	Saiyuki video games	Son Goku	Also Reload and Gunlock	
2003	Star Ocean: Till the End of Time	Fayt Leingod	PS2	
2003–06	Muv-Luv series and related age games	Takeru Shirogane	18+ PC, 17+ PS3/PSV/Xbox360	
2003	Bobobo-bo Bo-bobo Hajikesai	Heppoko round	PS1/PS2	
2003–04	Ai Yori Aoshi series	Kaori Hanabishi	Also Fall, Spring and summer	
2003–05	Croket! series	Risotto		
2003	Fatal Frame II: Crimson Butterfly	Itsuki Tachibana	PS1/PS2	
2004	Armored Core: Nexus	Narration of CM	PS1/PS2	
2004	Atelier Iris: Eternal Mana	Arlin	PS1/PS2	
2004–06	Meine Liebe series	Camus		
2004–06	Magna Carta series	Calintz		
2004	Shining Tears	Xion	PS1/PS2	
2004–15	The Prince of Tennis video games	Mukahi Gakuto		
2005	Shining Force Neo	Vandolf	PS1/PS2	
2005	Romancing SaGa: Minstrel Song	Raphael	PS1/PS2	
2005	Baldr Force EXE	Akira Nikaido	PS1/PS2	
2005–present	Sengoku Basara series	Sanada Yukimura		
2005	MAR Arm Fight Dream	Alvis	PS1/PS2	
2006	Growlanser: Heritage of War	Rufus	PS1/PS2	
2006–15	Higurashi When They Cry series	Keiichi Maebara		
2006	Blood+: One Night Kiss	Yoshioka Akirani	PS1/PS2	
2006	Princess Princess: Himetachi no Abunai Hōkago	Sakamoto Yoshiaki	PS1/PS2	
2006	Digimon World Data Squad	Daimon Masaru	PS1/PS2	
2007	Shining Wind	Souma Akizuki, Xero	PS1/PS2	
2007	Another Century's Episode 3: The Final	Kira Yamato	PS1/PS2	
2007–14	Alice in the Country of Hearts series	Pierce Villers	also remakes	
2008	Luminous Arc 2	Roland	DS	
2008–11	Macross Ace Frontier series	Brera Stern	Also Triangle and Ultimate	
2008	Blazer Drive	Yaiba	DS	
2008	Dissidia Final Fantasy	Bartz Klauser	PSP	
2009	Tales of the World: Radiant Mythology 2	Keele Zeibel	PSP	
2009–13	Starry Sky series	Homare Kanakubo		
2010	Valkyria Chronicles II	Dirk Gassenarl / Leon Hadensu	PSP	
2010	.hack//Link	Metronom	PSP	
2010–11	Heaven's Lost Property series	Tomoki Sakurai	PSP	
2010	Another Century's Episode: R	Kira Yamato / Gino Weinberg / Brera Stern	PS3	
2010	The Betrayal Knows My Name: Tasogare ni ochita inori	Kamio Yutsuki	PS1/PS2	
2011	Another Century's Episode Portable	Kira Yamato	PSP	
2011	Valkyria Chronicles III	Leon Hadensu	PSP	
2011	Tales of the World: Radiant Mythology 3	Keele Zeibel	PSP	
2011	Dissidia 012 Final Fantasy	Bartz Klauser	PSP	
2011	Rewrite	Mido	PC, also remake 2014	
2011	Tales of Xillia	Claine K. Charles	PS3	
2012	Shining Blade	Rage	PSP	
2012–14	Gunslinger Stratos series	Kusakageryo	Arcade, also 2	
2012–15	Kuroko's Basketball series	Yukio Kasamatsu		
2012	Bravely Default	Ominas Crowe	DS	
2013	Super Robot Wars Operation Extend	Kira Yamato	PSP	
2014	Shining Resonance	Zest Graham	PS3	
2014	Final Fantasy Explorers	Bartz Klauser	3DS	
2015	Return to PoPoLoCRoIS: A STORY OF SEASONS Fairytale	Lou	DS	
2015	Blade Arcus from Shining EX	Rage	Arcade	
2015	Dissidia Final Fantasy NT	Bartz Klauser	Arcade/PS4/PC	
2016–	IDOLiSH7	Momose Sunohara	Android/iOS	
2016	Persona 5	Goro Akechi	PS3/PS4	
2016	World of Final Fantasy	Bartz Klauser	PS4/VITA/PC/NS/XONE	
2017	Dissidia Final Fantasy: Opera Omnia	Bartz Klauser	Android/iOS	
2019	Persona 5 Royal	Goro Akechi	PS4	
2021	Final Fantasy XIV: Endwalker	Hythlodaeus	PC/PS4/PS5	
2022	SD Gundam Battle Alliance	Kira Yamato	PS4/PS5/XONE/NS/PC	
2023	Persona 5 Tactica	Goro Akechi		
2026	Dissidia Duellum Final Fantasy	Bartz Klauser	Android/iOS	

=== Tokusatsu ===
List of voice performances in anime
Year	Title	Role	Notes	Source(s)
2008–09	Engine Sentai Go-onger	Engine Birca	Ep. 3-47, 50	
2008	Engine Sentai Go-onger: Boom Boom! Bang Bang! GekijōBang!!	Engine Birca	Movie	
2009	Engine Sentai Go-onger vs. Gekiranger	Engine Birca	Movie	
2010	Samurai Sentai Shinkenger vs. Go-onger: GinmakuBang!!	Engine Birca	Movie	

=== Drama CD ===
List of voice performances in audio recordings
Title	Role	Notes	Source(s)
7 Seeds	Haru Yukima		
Alice in the Country of Hearts	Pierce Villers		
The Betrayal Knows My Name	Yuki Sakurai/Gioh		
B Gata H Kei	Takashi Kosuda		
D.N.Angel	Daisuke Niwa		
GetBackers	Kazuki Fuuchouin		
Harukanaru Toki no Naka de	Eisen, Minamoto no Motomi, Taira no Atsumori, Hiko Futsu		
Higurashi When They Cry series	Keiichi Maebara		
Hot Gimmick Compact Disc	Subaru Yagi		
Macross Frontier	Brera Sterne		
Mo Dao Zu Shi	Wen Ning/On Nei		
Nagasarete Airantō	Oriental Institute Yukito		
Ouran High School Host Club	Hikaru Hitachiin		
Saiyuki	Son Goku		
Scrapped Princess	Christopher Armalite, Master		
Sengoku Basara	Sanada Yukimura		
Soul Eater	Soul Evans		
Special A	Jun Yamamoto		
Tactics	Sugino		

=== Dubbing ===
List of voice performances in overseas dubs
Title	Role	Notes	Source(s)
10 Things I Hate About You	Cameron James	Joseph Gordon-Levitt	
The Admiral: Roaring Currents	Yi Hwoe	Kwon Yul	
Baywatch	Hobie Buchannon		
Ben 10 series	Ben Tennyson		
Cadet Kelly	Brad		
Detention	Mr. Chang Ming-hui		
The Emperor's Club	Martin Blythe		
Fantasy Factory	Rocky		
I Wonder If We Can Get Married?	Ha Joeng		
Jennifer's Body	Chip Dove	Johnny Simmons	
Ocean Girl	Rocky		
The Outsiders	Johnny Cade		
Power Rangers in Space	Andros		
Protect the Boss	Cha Mu-won		
Road to Avonlea	Felix King		
Seed of Chucky	Glen		
Sesame Street	Carlo	Carlo Alban	
The Shining	Tony		
Tai Chi 0	Yang Lu Chan	Jayden Yuan	
Tai Chi Hero	Prince Dun	Yuan Wenkang	
Young Riders	Jesse James		

== Discography ==
=== Albums ===
List of albums, with selected details
Title	Details	Catalog no.
One Songs	Released: April 11, 2012; Label: King; Format: CD	KICS-1760
Little World	Released: May 30, 2014; Label: King; Format: CD	KICS-3063
