= Someday's Dreamers =

2003 television anime

- Japanese volume one cover

魔法遣いに大切なこと (Things That Are Precious to a Mage)
- Genre: Coming-of-age
- Manga
- Written by: Norie Yamada
- Illustrated by: Kumichi Yoshizuki
- Published by: Kadokawa Shoten
- English publisher: NA: Tokyopop Viz Media
- Magazine: Comic Dragon
- Original run: May 2002 – January 2003
- Volumes: 2
- Anime television series
- Directed by: Masami Shimoda
- Produced by: Akio Matsuda; Satoshi Fujita; Shun Shimizu; Masaru Kōno
- Written by: Norie Yamada
- Music by: Takefumi Haketa
- Studio: J.C.Staff; Viewworks
- Licensed by: NA: Sentai Filmworks
- Original network: TV Asahi
- Original run: January 9, 2003 – March 27, 2003
- Episodes: 12
- Manga

Someday's Dreamers: Spellbound
- Written by: Norie Yamada
- Illustrated by: Kumichi Yoshizuki
- Published by: Fujimi Shobo
- English publisher: NA: Tokyopop Viz Media
- Magazine: Monthly Dragon Age
- Original run: December 2003 – February 2006
- Volumes: 5
- Manga

Someday's Dreamers: Summer Skies
- Written by: Norie Yamada
- Illustrated by: Kumichi Yoshizuki
- Published by: Kadokawa Shoten
- Magazine: Monthly Shōnen Ace
- Original run: February 26, 2008 – 2009
- Anime television series

Someday's Dreamers II: Sora
- Directed by: Osamu Kobayashi
- Produced by: Akio Matsuda; Naomi Sudō; Noboru Sugiyama; Kazuo Ōnuki
- Written by: Norie Yamada
- Music by: Takefumi Haketa
- Studio: Hal Film Maker
- Licensed by: NA: Sentai Filmworks
- Original network: TV Asahi
- Original run: July 2, 2008 – September 24, 2008
- Episodes: 12
- Live-action film
- Directed by: Shun Nakahara
- Written by: Norie Yamada (original concept and screenplay)
- Studio: Nikkatsu
- Released: December 20, 2008
- Runtime: 100 minutes

Someday's Dreamers (Japanese: 魔法遣いに大切なこと, Hepburn: Mahōtsukai ni Taisetsu na Koto; lit. "Things That Are Precious to a Mage") is a Japanese manga series written by Norie Yamada and illustrated by Kumichi Yoshizuki. It was serialized in Fujimi Shobo's Comic Dragon magazine from May 2002 to January 2003 and was later collected in two bound volumes. In 2006, Tokyopop released the manga in the United States under the name Someday's Dreamers.

Someday's Dreamers was also adapted into an anime television series that was animated by J.C.Staff under the direction of Masami Shimoda. It is loosely based on the storyline of the first manga series, with new characters added to the story. It ran for a total of 12 episodes on TV Asahi and was later licensed by Geneon Entertainment USA. After the closure of Geneon USA, the series was relicensed by Sentai Filmworks.

Another story set in the same universe, Someday's Dreamers: Spellbound (魔法遣いに大切なこと 太陽と風の坂道, Mahōtsukai ni Taisetsu na Koto: Taiyō to Kaze no Sakamichi), written and drawn by the same author and illustrator, was serialized in Kadokawa Shoten's Comic Dragon Age. It ran from December 2003 to February 2006 and was later released in five bound volumes. In 2006, Tokyopop released the manga in the United States.

In 2007, Norie Yamada and Kumichi Yoshizuki began work on a third title in the Someday's Dreamers universe, titled Summer Skies (魔法遣いに大切なこと 〜夏のソラ〜, Mahōtsukai ni Taisetsu na Koto: Natsu no Sora). It was serialized in Kadokawa Shoten's Monthly Shōnen Ace and began its run in the April issue, released on February 26, 2008. Summer Skies was scheduled to have a live action movie adaptation released on December 20, 2008, though it was originally scheduled for a summer 2008 premiere. The story was also adapted into an anime television series, following the new main character, Sora. The series is directed by Osamu Kobayashi and is animated by Hal Film Maker. It aired on TV Asahi from July 2, 2008, to September 24, 2008.

== Plot ==
=== Someday's Dreamers ===
The story is set in present-day Tokyo. Much of the setting is based upon real areas, the more obvious ones being the Shibuya Crossing and the Tokyo Tower. The main backdrop of the series where all the characters reside is Shimokitazawa, roughly six minutes west of Shibuya on the Keio Inokashira Line. The Bureau of Magic is in Tokyo, which employs Mage Labor for certain special requests by everyday people. However, the mages must only use their magic with special permission, and any unlicensed use results in a penalty. The story is very gentle and centers around the protagonist, a witch named Yume Kikuchi (菊池 ユメ, Kikuchi Yume), a second-year senior high school student from Tono in Iwate prefecture. In order to train as a magic user, she travels to Tokyo during her summer break to apprentice under the charming Masami Oyamada (小山田 雅美, Oyamada Masami). The story tells of Yume's trials and tribulations as she works toward her eventual graduation as a full-fledged magic user licensed by the Bureau of Magic. There is a strong undercurrent of romance which is never resolved.

=== Mahōtsukai ni Taisetsu na Koto: Natsu no Sora ===
Sora Suzuki is a cheerful girl with magical abilities who lives with her mother in the small town of Biei, Hokkaido. With the intention to honour a promise made to her late father, she successfully applies for a magic internship in Tokyo and temporarily moves into a boarding house in the city. Over the course of a summer month, she meets other teenagers studying to become accredited mages, including an initially aloof boy who appears to lack magic abilities. Under the guidance of their mentors, the apprentices learn more about magic, each other, and life in general as they attend formal classes and work to fulfil contractual assignments for clients.

In the manga, Sora has a strange trait to her magic that manifests itself despite her ire; whenever Sora casts a spell, the result always involves sunflowers, though otherwise almost always how Sora intended it. This is absent in the anime.

== Cast ==
=== Someday's Dreamers ===
- Yume Kikuchi – Voiced by: Aoi Miyazaki (Japanese); Kari Wahlgren (English)
- Masami Oyamada – Voiced by: Jun'ichi Suwabe (Japanese); Erik Davies (English)
- Angela Charon Brooks – Voiced by: Akeno Watanabe (Japanese); Shereen Hickman (English)
- Melinda Iwashita – Voiced by: Akiko Hiramatsu (Japanese); Dina Sherman (English)
- Go Kato – Voiced by: Hiroshi Iida (Japanese); Bryce Papenbrook (English)
- Gin Pun – Voiced by: Kouji Tsujitani (Japanese); Dan Lorge (English)

=== Mahō Tsukai ni Taisetsu na Koto: Natsu no Sora ===
- Sora Suzuki – Voiced by: Kana Hanazawa (anime), Performed by: Rio Yamashita (live action)
- Seiichirou Hara – Voiced by: Rikiya Koyama (anime), Performed by: Tetsushi Tanaka (live action)
- Gouta Midorikawa – Voiced by: Tomoaki Maeno (anime), Performed by: Masaki Okada (live action)
- Hiyori Yamabuki – Voiced by: Mikako Takahashi (anime)
- Honomi Asagi – Voiced by: Marina Inoue (anime), Performed by: Yurie Midori (live action)
- Saori Shiraishi – Voiced by: Urara Takano (anime), Performed by: Hana Kino (live action)
- Kouji Kuroda – Voiced by: Daisuke Namikawa (anime), Performed by: Taiga (live action)

== Music ==
The composer of the anime soundtrack, Takefumi Haketa, hoped that girls would identify with the lead role and created music which had a nostalgic feel to it, evoking both English and Irish suburbs, but also memories of the European Middle Ages. Using traditional instruments such as Irish whistles, he created tracks based on jigs, reels and a real salsa track. For two themes, he employed the voices of a 10-member-strong choir of schoolchildren. The vocal songs were also arranged by Haketa and sung by Miki Taoka. The CD of the soundtrack was released in the U.S. in 2003 by Pioneer Anime LDC, Inc.

== Songs ==
=== Someday's Dreamers ===
- Opening theme: "Kaze no Hana" by Hana Hana
- Ending theme: "Under the Blue Sky" by The Indigo

=== Mahō Tsukai ni Taisetsu na Koto: Natsu no Sora ===
- Opening theme: "Fly Away" by Thyme
- Ending theme: "Kawaita Hana" (乾いた花) by micc

== Media ==
=== Manga ===
No.	Original release date	Original ISBN	North American release date	North American ISBN
01	—	—	March 7, 2006	978-1-59816-178-6
02	—	—	July 11, 2006	978-1-59816-179-3

No.	Original release date	Original ISBN	North American release date	North American ISBN
01	—	—	December 12, 2006	978-1-59816-642-2
02	—	—	April 10, 2007	978-1-59816-643-9
03	—	—	August 7, 2007	978-1-59816-644-6
04	—	—	December 11, 2007	978-1-59816-645-3
05	—	—	March 11, 2008	978-1-4278-0201-9

=== Episode list ===
Someday's Dreamers

Episode #	Episode name
01	Sunset of a Steel Frame Part One
02	Sunset of a Steel Frame Part Two
03	The Greatest News
04	A Summer Night and a Mage
05	An Apron and Champagne
06	I Want to Become a Mage
07	A Mage Who Couldn't Become a Mage
08	Enormous Power in the Name of Love
09	Yume, the Girl and a Seed of Summer
10	Magic's Whereabouts
11	A Broken Rainbow
12	Things Important to a Mage

=== Episode list ===
Someday's Dreamers II: Sora

Episode #	Episode name
01	From Biei
02	Tokyo
03	Sora
04	Gouta
05	Shimokitazawa
06	Friend
07	Crossroad
08	Mage
09	First Love
10	Life
11	Graduation
12	The Summer Sky
