= Thyme (band) =

Japanese pop rock band

- Origin: Japan
- Genre: Pop rock
- Years active: 2005–2010
- Label: Geneon Universal Entertainment
- Past members: Sayaka Kamiyama (Thyme); Teppei Shimizu; Takafumi Hoshino

Thyme /ˈtaɪm/ was a Japanese pop rock band. Originally, it was a solo project by the female singer Thyme, who had previously released three singles in 2002 as Sayaka Kamiyama. Kamiyama started collaborating with sound engineer Teppei Shimizu in July 2004, and changed her name to Thyme in June 2005. In December 2005, Thyme (the singer) and Shimizu formed the duo "Thyme" (the singer's name is normally stylized as "thyme" for distinction). In July 2006, Takafumi Hoshino officially joined and Thyme became a three-piece band. They had their major debut in September 2007 with their first official single "Hello". Thyme released their second single "Forever We Can Make It!" in April 2008; the title song was used as the opening theme to the anime series To Love-Ru. Thyme released their third single "Fly Away" on August 6, 2008, which had the title song used as the opening to the anime Mahō Tsukai ni Taisetsu na Koto: Natsu no Sora. Thyme released their first (and only) album First 9uality on September 3, 2008. On September 23, 2010, the band officially announced they have broken up, and Thyme (the singer) restarted her solo singing career. The band's name comes from the herb thyme.

== Members ==
- Sayaka "Thyme" Kamiyama (lyrics, vocals)
- Teppei Shimizu (arrangement, composition, guitar)
- Takafumi Hoshino (arrangement, engineering, lyrics)

== History ==
=== Indie ===
In 2004, Sayaka Kamiyama (神山さやか, Kamiyama Sayaka) was attempting to pursue a solo music career, and needed a composer to compose her music. In July 2004, she met a composer, Teppei Shimizu (清水哲平, Shimizu Teppei), and had their first live performance at a small concert hall in Tokyo, Japan in March 2005. On June 13, 2005, Kamiyama officially announced changing her stage name to "Thyme", and released the single "Seiten/Shiroi Hana" on October 30. On December 21, Thyme and Shimizu formed the duo "Thyme", which was followed in March 2006 by the single "Drive/Yasashii Uta ga Aru Bashō e". Between April 2005 and June 2006, Thyme was primarily occupied with playing at live events, or even on the street. In the early days of the duo's formation, a music engineer named Takafumi Hoshino (星野孝文, Hoshino Takafumi) was working with the duo in developing their music, and it later became apparent that his skills were essential for the band to progress, making him the third and final official member of Thyme in July 2006. On April 12, 2007, singer Thyme announced that she had changed her stage name to "thyme" on their official blog.

=== Geneon ===
Thyme was ultimately licensed by Geneon Universal Entertainment and released their major debut single "Hello" on September 5, 2007. The single's B-side track "Drive" is a re-arrangement of the song by the same name released on Thyme's second independent single. The A-side track "Hello" was featured on the Japanese music variety show Ongaku Senshi Music Fighter in September 2007 on Nippon Television. "Hello" was also used as the ending theme to the CBC radio show Sayurin no Music Paradise, and its sequel Sayurin no Music Paradise +. Thyme's second major single, "Forever We Can Make It!", was released on April 23, 2008, and the title song was used as the opening theme to the anime television series To Love-Ru, and the music program Prin ce2 (for May 2008). Thyme released their third single "Fly Away" on August 6, 2008, and the title track was used as the opening theme of the anime Mahō Tsukai ni Taisetsu na Koto: Natsu no Sora, and the ending theme in August 2008 to Prin ce2 and the music program Mupara-Tokku. Thyme released their first (and only) studio album First 9uality on September 3, 2008, in CD and CD+DVD formats. The band released their fourth single "Aisuru Hito" on December 3, 2008, and the title song was used as the theme song to the live-action film Mahō Tsukai ni Taisetsu na Koto. The band announced their breakup on September 23, 2010, and Thyme (the singer) restarted her solo singing career.

== Discography ==
=== Albums ===
Information	Copies sold
First 9uality: Release: September 3, 2008; Format: CD & CD+DVD; Oricon Top 200 Weekly Peak: #190	TBA

=== Singles ===
Information	Copies sold
"Hello" c/w "Drive": Released: September 5, 2007; Format: CD; Oricon Top 200 Weekly Peak: TBA	TBA
"Forever We Can Make It!" c/w "The Last Day": Released: April 23, 2008; Format: CD; Oricon Top 200 Weekly Peak: #57	2,053
"Fly Away" c/w "My Kitten": Release: August 6, 2008; Format: CD; Oricon Top 200 Weekly Peak: #100	TBA
"Aisuru Hito" (愛する人) c/w "Keep On My Way": Release: December 3, 2008; Format: CD; Oricon Top 200 Weekly Peak: TBA	TBA

=== Independent singles ===
Information
"Seiten/Shiroi Hana" (晴天/白い花)
- Released: October 30, 2005
- Format: CD
"Drive/Yasashii Uta ga Aru Bashō e" (Drive/優しい歌がある場所へ)
- Released: March 2006
- Format: CD

== Live ==
- Shibuya eggman (January 7, 2008)
- First One Man Live in Shimokitazawa Era (May 12, 2008)

== Radio ==
- Hello we are Thyme!!! (FM Aichi, every Saturday 7:00-7:30 PM)
