= First 9uality =

Studio album by Thyme
- Released: September 3, 2008
- Genre: J-pop, rock
- Length: 49:32
- Label: Geneon

First 9uality (read as "First Quality") is the debut studio album by Thyme, released by Geneon on September 3, 2008, in CD and CD+DVD versions. The album CD contains twelve tracks, five of which were previously featured on one of Thyme's first three singles. The DVD contains music videos of Thyme's first three singles. The tracks are written and sung by singer-songwriter Thyme, except for "Our Rock Star" which had Takafumi Hoshino helping Thyme with the lyrics. The tracks are composed, arranged, and produced by Teppei Shimizu and Hoshino.

== Track listing ==
CD

1. "Seiten" (晴天, "Fine Weather") – 3:53
2. "Hello" – 4:30
3. "Our Rock Star" – 3:59
4. "Forever We Can Make It!" – 4:18
5. "Drive" 3:58
6. "Fly Away" – 3:56
7. "I'll Be Back" – 4:31
8. "The Last Day" – 3:51
9. "Babycar" – 3:29
10. "My Life" – 3:53
11. "Humming Bird" – 4:09
12. "Wonderland" – 5:05

DVD

1. "Hello"
2. "Forever We Can Make It!"
3. "Fly Away"
