= Animal Yokochō =

Manga and anime series for children

- Cover of the first manga volume of Animal Yokochō

アニマル横町 (Animaru Yokochō)
- Genre: Comedy, fantasy
- Manga
- Written by: Ryō Maekawa
- Published by: Shueisha
- English publisher: Shueisha (digital)
- Imprint: Ribon Mascot Comics
- Magazine: Ribon
- Original run: February 2000 – present
- Volumes: 23
- Anime television series
- Directed by: Yukio Nishimoto; Nam Jong-sik
- Music by: Yasunori Iwasaki
- Studio: Gallop; Dong Woo Animation
- Original network: TXN (TV Tokyo)
- English network: PH: Cartoon Network
- Original run: October 4, 2005 – September 26, 2006
- Episodes: 51 (102 segments)

Animal Yokochō (アニマル横町, Animaru Yokochō; trans. Animal Alley) is a Japanese manga series written and illustrated by Ryo Maekawa and serialized in Ribon Magazine, Ribon Original and Ribon Bikkuri. It is the story about a little girl who has a doorway to another world in her room, from which three bizarre and frequently-annoying stuffed animal-like creatures emerge to make her life "interesting". This manga's characters originally appeared in Ribon Original as quiz column's characters.

The manga won the award for children's manga at the 51st Shogakukan Manga Awards.

== Plot ==
=== The gate to AniYoko ===
It is explained in the anime that AniYoko itself is an alternative world inhabited by stuffed-animal-like creatures. The only method of travel between AniYoko and the human world is through a door mounted on the floor of Ami's bedroom. The Trio has given many conflicting and spurious explanations for how the door got there, but the real answer may never be revealed to Ami nor the viewer. Still, nothing overly sinister appears to be involved, as Kenta said in the second story, "That's the setting for the story, so don't worry about it", breaking the fourth wall, something that happens often in the show.

The door is two-way. It is most often used by the Trio to enter our world and interact with Ami, who they seem to find strangely fascinating. Ami could go through the door herself and enter AniYoko but, due to the insistent Trio and their strange often frightening stories, has yet to do so in the anime and AniYoko itself has never actually appeared, with only a dark space being shown whenever Ami looks inside. Scenes of AniYoko do appear in the Trio's recollections and stories, but these often are immediately shown to be false, and no objective AniYoko scenes have ever been shown. On one episode, it has shown Iyo's bedroom.

The presence of the door and the Trio seems to have had some effect on Ami's room itself. Ami and the Trio frequently find that they can go to many other places, such as a jungle, a forest, a baseball stadium (complete with crowd) and an RPG-style dungeon, without actually leaving the room.

== Characters ==
Ami Matsuzaki (松崎 亜美, Matsuzaki Ami)
Voiced by: Erika (Japanese)
Ami Matsuzaki (松崎 亜美), the protagonist of the anime, is a preschool student who is quite mature for her age and has just moved into a new home and neighborhood with her family. She is intelligent and imaginative, but grounded and a bit easily flustered. The revelation that a gate to Ani-Yoko is in her room, and the increasingly bizarre actions of her three visitors, frequently drive her to the brink of total distraction, yet she seems to have gotten used to their presence, with Ami sharing some of her regular life with them. Her date of birth is 15 December and her zodiac sign is Sagittarius.
Iyo
Voiced by: Rumi Shishido (Japanese)
Iyo (イヨ) is one of the three creatures from AniYoko, known as "the Happy AniYoko Trio", who frequently visit Ami through the door on her floor. She looks like a stuffed rabbit, and can use a sort of energy discharged through the space between her ears for all kinds of effects. She can also store objects and liquids in her ears, to be dispensed as needed. Although she always tries to act cheerful and cute, she is frequently selfish and vain. She also has the habit of dying when abused or neglected, only to return to life when a suitable apology is made. She somewhat resembles a Snowshoe Rabbit. Her date of birth is 4 January and her zodiac sign is Capricorn.
Kenta
Voiced by: Naomi Nagasawa (Japanese)
Kenta (ケンタ) has the appearance of a stuffed bear. He is brusque, frequently rude, and sometimes picks up odd obsessions. He has a love-hate dynamic with Iyo, with whom he is always arguing or fighting but he still appears to be close to her. His attempts to assert his species' identity frequently end in disaster. He is always seen wearing a red scarf, and it is usually a sign that something is very wrong if he is without it. He also often gives the punchline in jokes where all three of the trio are involved. Kenta was very close to an old human lady, whom he called grandmother (baa-chan) she moved away to live with her daughter and gave him his scarf as a farewell gift. He has a major crush on Ami's friend, Ku-Chan. His date of birth is 6 May and his zodiac sign is Taurus.
Issa
Voiced by: Yūko Satō (Japanese)
Issa (イッサ) is a creature that looks like a stuffed panda. He refers to himself as "the empathic one" of the trio, puts the most effort into trying to be nice to Ami, and makes many unsuccessful efforts to make peace between Iyo and Kenta. His date of birth is 23 November and his zodiac sign is Sagittarius.
Mr. Yamanami
Voiced by: Kenyu Horiuchi (Japanese)
Mr. Yamanami (ヤマナミさん Yamanami-san) is a horse, apparently the leader of AniYoko. He frequently appears to make a small contribution to the scene or some demand on the cast, and then departs. Issa has said that all the creatures of AniYoko must obey "Commander Yamanami" or face an unspecified but terrible punishment. Yamanami also operates a "black-market mail-order" service, which occasionally delivers goods to Ami's room. It is implied that there are numerous Yamanamis, occupying different roles in AniYoko society. His birthday and zodiac sign are unknown.
Ayako Matsuzaki
Ayako is Ami's mother. She is occasionally heard, but she has never made a physical appearance. There is no indication that Ayako is aware of the existence of AniYoko or any of the strange events surrounding Ami's life, although she sometimes notices the effects when something Ami or the three creatures do affects their real-world activities.
Kumiko Takeda
Voiced by: Kaori Fukuhara (Japanese)
Kumiko Takeda (竹田 久美子) is Ami's close friend. She is a rather timid and frail girl and is one of the few people who can see the AniYoko Trio and others as they really are (although she annoyingly looks for Kenta's batteries believing that he's a toy), and shares in some of the adventures that Ami has. She seems to be very open to what happens. Her date of birth is 21 May. Kenta appears to have a crush on her, much to Iyo's annoyance. Ku-chan suffers from a paralyzing fear of horses due to an unfortunate incident in a stable (in anime, a horse bit her head when she was a baby), so any interaction she has with Yananami-san is extremely traumatic. Her date of birth is 21 May and her zodiac sign is Gemini.
Catherine Maekawa
Catherine Maekawa (カトリーヌ前川) is Ami's favorite manga artist. It is revealed in the anime that she is currently engaged in a manga series about sumo wrestling. Iyo has been to her house, after stowing away in a fan letter written by Ami, but she did not appear to notice.
Others

- Match & Pitch (まっち&ピッチ). Voiced by: Nanae Kato and Naoko Suzuki

Match (まっち, Machi) is one of the recurring characters who appears sporadically. Match is originally a girl (which was confirmed with the dress she is wearing at the first ending theme of the anime), but in the Cartoon Network English dubbing, Match is addressed as a "he" throughout the entire series. She and Kenta go way back in the past as training partners in a Martial Arts Dojo and addresses him as "Anikki" (Big Bro or Bro in Japanese). According to Yamanami-san, Match is also a Jack-of-all-Trades in the professional world and considers her as the greatest bane of the Yamanami Industries. It was never mentioned or confirmed what kind of animal Match is (in one episode in the anime, Kenta does not know himself), but she is rumored to be a Tarsier. Her date of birth is 4 April and her zodiac sign is Aries. Pitch (ピッチ, Pichi) is a Yellow Canary who accompanies Match to everywhere she goes. Pitch also serves as Match's assistant at work and does domestic duties for her.

- Shima Shimako (しま シマ子). Voiced by: Urara Takano (Japanese)

Shima Shimako like Yamanami-san is also a Zebra who walks upright on two legs. She is Aniyoko's showbiz idol (Model, Actress, Singer/Dancer) and is admired by every girl in Ani-yoko. Being Ani-yoko's biggest celebrity, she has a bratty celebrity-attitude. Mr. Yamanami is very much obsessed with her and will do anything (to the point of closing out his business) just to get a date with her. She tries to "fix" bad fashions that she sees people make, but she makes it worse.

== Media ==
=== Manga ===
In 2026, the series became licensed digitally in English on Shueisha's Manga Million platform.

=== Anime ===
==== Episodes ====
1. A new friend - The door has opened - 11 October 2005
2. Let's bake a cake - Let's do our homework - 18 October 2005
3. Puzzled punch - Dark pan - 25 October 2005
4. Catalog shopping - Catching a cold - 1 November 2005
5. Secret diet - Fan letter - 8 November 2005
6. Fortunetelling Paradise - The BIG Fight 15 November 2005
7. The story of Kenta's scarf - Iyo Affair - 22 November 2005
8. Art of punchlines- AniYoko Shiritori - 29 November 2005
9. Playing Cards - Autumn's Terror - 6 December 2005
10. Exchange of Diaries - Murder of Yamanami-san - 13 December 2005
11. It's my Birthday - Snowball Fight - 20 December 2005
12. Christmas -Curing Insomnia - 27 December 2005
13. Spring Cleaning - Hotspring - 3 January 2006
14. Everyone's Superb - Watching the House - 10 January 2006
15. Ku-chan's First Appearance - Truth of Kenta - 17 January 2006
16. Preventing Cavities - I have many Interests - 24 January 2006
17. Yamanami Battle 2 - Speech Meet - 30 January 2006
18. The day before the field trip - Ami's First Love?! - 7 February 2006
19. Valentine - Big Discovery - 14 February 2006
20. Rival? - Adults? - 21 February 2006
21. Video War - Issa's Special Abilities - 28 February 2006
22. Rabbit and Tortoise - Investigation Team - 7 March 2006
23. Mini Mini Big Adventure - AniYoko Newspaper - 28 March 2006

==== Music ====
Opening themes

1. Tondemo Nothing ~Doki☆Doki Animal Yokocho (飛んでもNothing 〜どき☆どき アニマル横町のうたの巻〜) ~ by Ami with Iyo, Kenta, Issa
2. Love Chu You!! (ラブ chu ユー!!) by Ribbon Girl

Ending themes

1. Fantasista Girl (ファンタジスタ★ガール) by The Indigo
2. Sweetie by Fumiko Orikasa
