= Nao Nagasawa (voice actress) =

Japanese voice actress (born 1971)

- 永澤 菜教
- Born: Naomi Kawai (河合 直美); May 12, 1971 (age 55); Toyonaka, Osaka, Japan
- Occupation: Voice actress
- Years active: 1991–present
- Agent: Kekke Corporation
- Height: 156 cm (5 ft 1 in)
- Spouse: Male non-celebrity (m. 2018)
- Children: 1

Naomi Kawai (河合 直美, Kawai Naomi; born May 12, 1971), known professionally as Nao Nagasawa (永澤 菜教, Nagasawa Nao) and formerly Naomi Nagasawa (長沢 直美, Nagasawa Naomi) is a Japanese voice actress from Toyonaka, Osaka who used to be represented by Aoni Production and Ken Production and is now represented by Kekke Corporation. She was formerly married to Ryōtarō Okiayu and they had a daughter.

== Notable roles ==
- Animal Yokocho (2005) as Kenta
- Ushio and Tora (2015) as Izuna

Unknown date

- Beyblade (2003) as Daichi Sumeragi
- Brave Command Dagwon as Manabu Tobe
- Case Closed as Reiko (ep. 1)
- Cosmic Baton Girl Comet-san as Mook
- Dance in the Vampire Bund as Hiroe Ubayama
- Digimon Universe: Appli Monsters as Copipemon
- Infinite Ryvius as Cliff Kei, Eins Crawford
- Princess Nine as Hikaru Yosihmoto
- Anpanman as Chibi Marine, Futomaki-kun
- Ojamajo Doremi as Majorika
- PaRappa the Rapper as Ghost (ep. 12)
- Gregory Horror Show as Neko Zombie
- Kindaichi Case Files as Mako Ichikawa, Asami Hanamura, Madoka Komine
- s-CRY-ed as Nasarooku
- Rumic Theater as Pitto
- Detective School Q as Kyoko Ebu
- The Brave Express Might Gaine as Hiroshi
- The Long Journey of Porphy as Doora
- Tegami Bachi as Steak
- Tales of Berseria as Bienfu

== Dubbing roles ==
=== Live-action ===
- Blossom as Six LeMeure
- The Princess Diaries 2: Royal Engagement as Lilly Moscovitz (Heather Matarazzo)
- School of Rock as Alicia "Brace Face" (Aleisha Allen)

=== Animation ===
- Star Wars: Ewoks as Wicket W. Warrick
- Ice Age: Dawn of the Dinosaurs as Crash
- Invader Zim as Zim
- Quack Pack as Huey
- Thomas & Friends as Mavis (Season 3 only)
- Yin Yang Yo! as Yang
