= List of GetBackers characters =

Getbackers characters

A selection of the characters from the series

The following is a list of fictional characters featured in the manga and anime series GetBackers.

== Protagonists ==
=== Ban Midou ===
Voiced by: Voiced by: Nobutoshi Canna, Naomi Shindou (as a child) (Japanese); Rich McDonald (ep 1-5), Jason Liebrecht (ep 6-49) (English)

Ban Midou (美堂蛮, Midō Ban) is one of the main protagonists in GetBackers. His name came from his mother's surname "Midou" and "Ban" from the Japanese word for Savage (野蛮, Yaban). The "ban" can mean "barbarian" or "uncouth/vulgar".

In the GetBackers duo, he is the one who thinks of the plans for their moves. Initially, Ginji Amano was seen to be a sidekick to him (when they first formed their partnership, Ban insists that Ginji is only his sidekick), but as the story progresses, Ginji gradually holds his own in their missions, and Ban acknowledges him as an equal.

Ban studies fighting techniques, science, history, music, art and magic from a very young age as a result of being hunted in Europe by shamans during his childhood.

He bears a striking resemblance to his father. In the arcs where his hair is "down" ("Venus de Milo" and "Kiryuudo" arcs), he looks like Der Kaiser during his Getbackers days with Paul. Another trait which both father and son share is that while they may appear cold and ruthless on the surface, they are actually very warm and caring towards their friends.

Ban inherites his powers from his grandmother. He utilizes two main abilities. His primary technique is the Evil Eye (邪眼, Jagan), which allows him to force anyone he makes eye contact with watch a one-minute-long illusion. It should only be used three times per day and cannot be used on the same person again for the next 24 hours. Furthermore, while the illusion only lasts for one minute, the one affected by the Jagan can be placed inside a time warp zone via the illusion created by the technique, meaning that to them, one minute in real life could last up to several hours in the Jagan's influence. It is rare for Ban to use the Evil Eye to defeat his opponents, preferring to use it to aid in the retrieval process or to give clients happy/nightmarish dreams; however, he has been shown to use it in defeating Takuma Fudou's insight during the blank second.

If the user uses the Jagan a fourth time within a 24-hour period, they would receive a penalty for using it. After the fourth use the user disappears both from the physical world and from the memories of all who know him. With this in mind, Ban requests one final duel with Akabane. After an intense struggle, the two manage to strike each other, causing Ban to collapse and Akabane to disappear. However, Akabane does not die, as assumed, but instead, implants a surgical scalpel into Ban's chest as a "final favor", given to Ban for allowing Akabane to see his own limits. Akabane later explains that because having Ban disappear would be a pity, he attempts to fool the "Archive" by faking Ban's death and delaying Ban's disappearance from using his fourth Jagan just long enough for Ginji to reach Babylon City and resolve everything, thus saving Ban from disappearing.

His second ability is the Snakebite. Because he is a direct descendant of the Witch clan, and was born under the star of Asclepius, he possesses incredible superhuman strength, which gives him a gripping force of 200 kilograms in each hand. It is also shown that he is strong enough to break open the doors of an armored steel truck and punch hard enough to create large craters in the ground or break walls, occasionally even collapsing multistory buildings. Ban can augment the strength of his Snakebite by reciting a certain chant in order to draw power from Asclepius, with the resulting force being sufficient to devastate even the most formidable of opponents with just a single blow. The full extent of the Asclepius curse upon Ban is expressed through his entire right arm degenerating into a grotesque state not unlike a demon's limb, granting Ban even greater power but at the risk of losing himself to his savage instincts. Later Ban manages to transcend the Asclepius curse and draw out his full potential on his own, which is reflected by the manifestation of a single angel wing behind his right shoulder.

In the "Get Back the Lost Time" arc, his skills grow by leaps and bounds due to his learning abilities. Against Natsuhiko, he manages to execute a new move, "Snake Kill", using his left hand.

Anime News Network praised the style of the Jagan in the manga to be a "horrifying nightmare". The Tokyo Pop translation of the Ban Midou dialogues has been criticized for making him sound like a gangster.

== Shinjuku Allies ==
When Yamato is 28 years old, he is alone with Ban in their house so that they might face his "Voodoo Child mirror" (Himiko was sent out to buy a cake.) As a Voodoo Child, if one of two-halves dies, both perish. Ban realizes this too late when his "Snake Bite" kills Yamato's other half. When Himiko comes back with the cake, she sees Ban's hand covered with Yamato's blood. Since that day, she holds a grudge against Ban. Occasionally an enemy, but more frequently an ally, Himiko has mixed feelings for Ban, whom she sees is a good person, but cannot reconcile this with her brother's killer. On Ban's part, he treats Himiko more like a little sister.

With her brother, Yamato, they develop around 200 poison concoctions, but only carry seven with them at any one time. Some of the commonly used scents are Flame Perfume, Devolution Perfume, Puppet Perfume, Tracking Perfume, Sleep Perfume, Acceleration Perfume, and Antidote Perfume.

It is revealed that these perfumes are 'catalysts' to evoke certain spells and magic related to the perfume. Ban once said, thinking that the perfumes are the true essence of the technique, that the Kudou siblings must carry many perfumes to their jobs, but Himiko retaliates, "How can perfumes only do anything in our 'magic shows'?" Yamato explains that a man can only perform seven different spells at a given time to avoid being overloaded, hence only seven vials of perfumes are brought for each mission. It was the first clue to Yamato and Himiko's past: Ban's grandmother and Maria Noches always warns him against 'catalysts', and how they are also used by 'our greatest enemy, the Shamans'.

In later chapters, it is revealed that she is Ban's sister by consanguinity through the Witch Queen. In the final chapter, she is shown with her trademark short hair, together with the other Transporters, as they set out for their next job, which is linked to Ban's mother.

=== Kazuki Fuuchouin ===
Voiced by: Voiced by: Soichiro Hoshi (Japanese); Matt Hislope (English)

Kazuki Fuuchouin (風鳥院花月, Fūchōin Kazuki) is a major supporting character and ally of the GetBackers. Formerly one of the Four Kings of the Volts, known as Kazuki of the Threads, Kazuki is the last master of the Fuuchouin Thread Arts, a fighting style which utilizes koto strings controlled by vibrations in his fingertips. The strings are very sharp and can tear up solid earth, bones, skin, muscles, and sometimes steel based on the vibrations of the finger. The strings also have other uses, such as listening in on distant conversations. The strings are stored in two bells tied to the front right strand of his hair to ease manipulation.

It is later revealed that the enemy clan, the Kokuchouin, destroyed Kazuki's clan. Kazuki is usually an ally of the GetBackers, due to his friendship with Ginji. He and Ban tolerate each other, but they are not close. Kazuki is also the most notably feminine character among the males. He also has strong ties to one of their former enemies, namely Juubei, because they had been friends in the past. In the end of the manga revealed that the GB world is an AI simulation with Infinity Tower as its conduit, explaining the superpowers the characters have.

=== Shido Fuyuki ===
Voiced by: Voiced by: Takanori Hoshino (Japanese); Omar Gallaga (English)

Shido Fuyuki (冬木士度, Fuyuki Shido), first introduced as the Beastmaster, has the ability to control animals, although it should be better stated that he asks them for favors, as he views animals as his friends.

== Shinjuku Residents ==
=== Ryudo Hishiki ===
The GetBackers avoided fighting him at all costs after their first encounter, but keep running into him because of their jobs. He is most often pitted against Ginji. He is more of a recurring character in the manga, showing up on several different cases but appears less often in the anime because most of the arcs in which he appears were not adapted. He is also reduced to a mostly non-speaking role in the anime, just making sounds, but can speak normally in the manga.

=== Yamato Kudou ===
Voiced by: Voiced by: Keiji Fujiwara (Japanese); Clayton Kjos (English)

Yamato Kudou (工藤邪馬人, Kudō Yamato) is Himiko's deceased older adoptive brother who takes her in when she is younger, though her age at this time is never explained in the manga. They are both Voodoo Children; the anime changed this to Last Children. At the beginning of the Voodoo Child arc, Ban states Yamato is her only family and nothing contradicts this. A filler episode in the anime focusing on Himiko portrays a teenaged Yamato saving her as a baby from nameless and featureless men who were planning on sacrificing her, afterwards taking her in and raising her as his younger sister. Yamato made Ban promise to take care of Himiko if anything should ever happen to him. Soon after, his Voodoo/Last Child curse was activated and he begged Ban to kill him, which Ban did but has not forgiven himself for, as he had come to care for Yamato despite only living with him a short amount of time, six months in the manga. In the anime, Yamato explicitly states he isn't being successful in finding a way to break his curse. Also in the anime, Ban inherits his lighter after he dies, and in both media, Ban only appears to start smoking after his death. When alive, he works as a Plunderer with Himiko and later Ban. Yamato mostly only appears in flashbacks due to his deceased status, but twice briefly comes back to life in the manga, once as a ghost in the Divine Design arc, summoned by a card from the titular game that Maria gave Himiko, and later in the Lost Time arc to break Himiko out of her trance by telling her Kagami wasn't the man she loved and to go back to the man she did love; Kagami notes the world begins to break down so badly the dead are coming back to life and dispatches him. He possessed far more knowledge of the Voodoo Children and the accompanying curse than Himiko does, but wants to hide as much about it from her as possible, despite his doing so likely leading Himiko straight into the Brain Trust and Kagami's clutches.

=== Madoka Otowa ===
Voiced by: (音羽マドカ Otowa Madoka; Voiced by: Yuki Matsuoka)

A child prodigy and extremely talented violinist. Although she is blind, she has amazing hearing abilities. She hired the GetBackers for a job once to get back her stolen Stradivarius violin. She has a guide dog named Mozart who also protects her when she is in danger. Eventually, she becomes Shido's girlfriend. She is once kidnapped by Shido's enemies the Kiriudo, another ancient clan of Japanese aboriginals who commune with insects, who wants to use her to exchange for the Chimera.

=== Miroku siblings ===
Voiced by: Voiced by: Tomokazu Seki (Japanese); Michael Mergen (English) (Natsuhiko)
Voiced by: Voiced by: Akiko Kimura (Japanese); Michael Mergen (English) (Yukihiko)

The Miroku 7 are a sibling team of seven martial artists, skilled in the use of different weapons and styles, although most of them use either swords or knives. They debut in the "Venus de Milo" arc protecting the arms of the statue for their client Hera, along with Akabane. Natsuhiko reveals early on that he (and his siblings except Yukihiko) is an old friend of Ban's who also wishes to kill him, like Himiko, though the reason for this is not revealed until later in the arc (Ban killed their older sister Eris). The group is led by the oldest, Natsuhiko (夏彦), but their most powerful member is Yukihiko (雪彦), the youngest. The other siblings are Hikage (緋影), Ukyou (右狂), Tsubaki (椿), Tokisada (時貞), and the only sister, Kirara (奇羅々). They all share the same body, but said body will physically change depending on who is active at the time; i.e. Kirara is physically female while all of her brothers are physically male. They often take turns manifesting to fight opponents, especially if one sibling has an advantage in certain situations the others do not, though they can rapidly switch with each other even in non-combat situations. The anime cut down the number of siblings to only two, Natsuhiko and Yukihiko, possibly due to time constraints and no reason for why Natsuhiko wants to kill Ban being revealed.

In the Lost Time arc, it is realized that Natsuhiko is a childhood playmate of Ban's in Germany and considers him his best friend, but after Ban kills his adopted sister and future fiancée Eris (エリス, erisu), the Miroku 7 became Ban's sworn enemies. It is also revealed the Miroku 7 merges into one when Natsuhiko reaches adulthood; the sole personality remaining is Yukihiko. They are supposed to do this already but the first six deliberately put the unification off until they could avenge Eris. Despite Natsuhiko and the others wanting to know why Ban kills Eris, he refuses to tell them, though it is revealed to the audience Ban kills Eris in self-defense. She makes a deal with the shamans to make Ban love her, but was tricked and began turning into a monster to kill Ban; she beggs Ban to kill her before she completely changes, which he did. Natsuhiko then discovered Eris' body with a bloody Ban standing nearby.

=== Maria Noches ===
Maria Noches (マリーア・ノーチェス, Marīa Nōchesu) is the Witch Queen's (Ban Midou's grandmother) best disciple and studies under her at the same time as Lucifer. Maria is an expert when it comes to magic and the occult, and runs a fortune-telling shop in Shinjuku's Fortune Teller Alley. Outwardly, she resembles an attractive, busty lady in her late 20s, but she's really 99 years old and uses magic to appear younger. The Witch Queen entrusts a young Ban to her after his mother rejected him and, has a soft spot for children in general. Maria takes him back to Japan with her and takes care of him for an unspecified amount of time before Ban runs away from her. She likens Ban to the son she never has, and although Ban is rude to her, he still has respect for his former guardian and cares about her. She first appears in the Divine Design arc when Ban approaches her for help fighting Lucifer. She is cheerful most of the time and at times, can act like a childish young lady, and as such, she's quite fond of Ginji Amano, especially when he turns into his chibi form. This clashes with her dark sense of humor and general love for dark and disturbing things, such as the sound of screaming mandrakes. As one of the most powerful members of the witches, she is feared and known by many. Her moniker, the Death Knell, demonstrates her power as the "right arm" of the Witch Queen, nemesis of the shamans, though she never gets to display this power in the present. According to Lucifer, she dances the flamenco passionately. The ending of Divine Design hints at a mutual attraction between her and Lucifer, though this is never followed up on due to his death in the next chapter.

Her voice actress is Michiko Neya on the drama CD.

== Infinity Fortress Residents ==
=== MakubeX ===
Voiced by: Voiced by: Mitsuki Saiga (Japanese); Andrea Skola (ep 1-5), Scott Yi (ep 6), John Minnich (ep 11-49) (English)

間久部X (Makube + Ekkusu) is the main antagonist of the I.L. arc when the GetBackers are hired to retrieve the mysterious "I.L." from him.
