= The Indigo =

Japanese band

- Origin: Japan
- Genres: J-Rock / J-pop
- Years active: 1998–2010
- Label: Geneon
- Members: Miki Taoka; Yuichi Ichikawa
- Past members: Kenichi Takagi
- Website: www.the-indigo.com

The Indigo is a Japanese band originally composed of Miki Taoka (田岡 美樹, Taoka Miki) on vocals, Yuichi Ichikawa (市川 裕一, Ichikawa Yūichi) on composition and arrangement, and Kenichi Takagi (高木 権一, Takagi Kenichi) on bass. They were first formed in 1998 and released their debut Maxi single Blue on May 24, 2000. This was followed by their 2nd Maxi Single Kikasete (きかせて) on August 30, 2000, and their first full album Blue on September 27, 2000. Takagi left the band prior to the release of their third album The Indigo have been a duo ever since. They are signed under NBCUniversal Entertainment Japan.

The Indigo's songs range from pop rock to slow ballads. Their discography shows a gradual shift from an alternative-pop rock hybrid towards a preference for ballads. Their style is also shown in their covers of various rock classics in their cover albums My Fair Melodies and My Fair Melodies 2. They have also performed several songs for both the opening and ending themes for anime television series. This includes Namo Shirenu Hana (名も知れぬ花) for Ai Yori Aoshi, Under the Blue Sky for Someday's Dreamers, I Do! for Ai Yori Aoshi Enishi, and more recently, Fantasista Girl (ファンタジスタ★ガール) for Animal Yokocho. They continued to release albums at a prodigious rate, averaging one per year, and toured Korea in late 2004 and early 2005. They also made their first appearances in the United States at Otakon 2005 in Baltimore and Anime Expo 2006 in Los Angeles. In 2007, with the release of their Best of The Indigo 2000–2006 as a chance to do so, The Indigo temporarily focused on their solo projects. The duo has been idle since 2010. Taoka went on to co-host the radio program Discover New Zealand on Kiss-FM Kobe.

== Discography ==
=== Albums ===
- Blue (September 27, 2000)
- Records (August 29, 2001)
- Poetic Beauty (January 17, 2002)
- My Fair Melodies (February 27, 2002) (Cover album)
- Sound of Fragrance (September 26, 2002)
- Indigo Suite (Best Indigo Music) (March 5, 2003)
- Glider (September 10, 2003)
- My Fair Melodies 2 (February 18, 2004) (Cover album)
- Song Is Love (August 4, 2004)
- Flair (November 9, 2005)
- Once More (June 7, 2006) (Cover album)
- Future Folk (November 8, 2006)
- Best of The Indigo 2000–2006 (April 4, 2007)
- Bivouac (November 10, 2010)

=== Singles ===
- Blue (May 24, 2000)
- Kikasete (きかせて) (August 30, 2000)
- Kokoro ni (ココロニ) (December 13, 2000)
- Brand New Day (April 25, 2001)
- Pain (June 27, 2001)
- Toikake (といかけ) (August 28, 2002)
- UNDER THE BLUE SKY (February 5, 2003)
- Sweet Radio (featuring Gota Nishidera (西寺郷太, Nishidera Gōta)) (July 30, 2003)
- I Do! (November 12, 2003)
- Fantasista Girl (ファンタジスタ★ガール) (October 26, 2005) (Animal Yokocho anime first ending theme)

=== Other songs ===
- Akai Hana: A one and a half-minute song that was used as the ending theme for episode 15 of the anime television series Ai Yori Aoshi. It was never released on any of the Indigo's albums or singles, and is only available on the album Ai Yori Aoshi Original TV Soundtrack 2.
