= Kou Fumizuki =

Japanese manga artist

Kou Fumizuki 文月 晃
- Area: Manga artist
- Notable works: Ai Yori Aoshi

Kou Fumizuki (文月 晃, Fumizuki Kō; born 8 March in Fukuoka Prefecture) is a Japanese manga artist. Fumizuki's most famous work to date is Ai Yori Aoshi, a 17-volume work which has been turned into an anime series. This series was followed by Umi no Misaki, serialized in Young Animal Magazine starting in the fifth issue of 2007 and concluding with its 127th and final chapter in the fifth issue of 2014. Both of these seinen manga series are harem-type romance comedies in which a naive young man finds himself surrounded by pretty girls vying for his attention. Since 2011 he has also been serializing Itadaki!, a light comedy about a girls' mountain climbing club, which appears intermittently in the magazine Young Animal Island. Starting October 9, 2015, in Young Animal he launched a new series, Boku to Rune to Aoarashi, about an art school student who goes on a pilgrimage to meet a great landscape painter named Seiran, and discovers an extraordinary girl in Seiran's household. In October 2016 it was announced that the final chapter of Boku to Rune to Aoarashi would appear in the 21st issue of 2016, out October 28.

== Works ==
Title	Year	Notes	Refs
Ai Yori Aoshi	1998–2005	Serialized in Young Animal; Published by Hakusensha in 17 volumes	
Umi no Misaki (海の御先)	2007–14	Serialized in Young Animal; Published in 15 volumes	
Itadaki (頂!)	2011	Serialized in Young Animal Island; Published in 1 volume	
Boku to Rune to Aoarashi	2015–2016	Serialized in Young Animal; Published in 3 volumes	
