= Ai Yori Aoshi =

Japanese seinen manga by Kou Fumizuki and its adaptations

- First tankōbon volume cover, featuring Aoi Sakuraba

藍より青し
- Genre: Harem; Romantic comedy; Slice of life
- Manga
- Written by: Kou Fumizuki
- Published by: Hakusensha
- English publisher: NA: Tokyopop
- Magazine: Young Animal
- Original run: 1998 – 2005
- Volumes: 17
- Anime television series
- Directed by: Masami Shimoda
- Produced by: Takeo Haruna; Shōichi Nakazawa; Yūichi Sekido; Yūji Matsukura
- Written by: Masaharu Amiya (series composition); Kenichi Kanemaki (story composition)
- Music by: Toshio Masuda
- Studio: J.C.Staff
- Licensed by: NA: Funimation
- Original network: Fuji TV
- Original run: April 10, 2002 – September 25, 2002
- Episodes: 24 + OVA
- Anime television series

Ai Yori Aoshi: Enishi
- Directed by: Masami Shimoda
- Produced by: Nobuyuki Yamamoto; Shōichi Nakazawa; Yūichi Sekido; Yūji Matsukura
- Written by: Kenichi Kanemaki
- Music by: Toshio Masuda
- Studio: J.C.Staff
- Licensed by: NA: Funimation
- Original network: CTC, TVK, TVS
- Original run: October 12, 2003 – December 28, 2003
- Episodes: 12 + OVA
- Video game

Memories of a Summer and Winter Vacation
- Developer: KID
- Publisher: JP: KID; NA: Hirameki International
- Genre: Visual novel
- Platform: JP: PlayStation 2; NA: Windows 98
- Released: JP: March 20, 2003; NA: September 29, 2005
- Video game

Ai Yori Aoshi shunka
- Publisher: J.C.Staff
- Genre: Visual novel
- Platform: Windows 98
- Released: May 20, 2004
- Video game

Ai Yori Aoshi Shūtō
- Publisher: J.C.Staff
- Genre: Visual novel
- Platform: Windows 98
- Released: June 24, 2004
- Video game

SuperLite 2000 Adventure: Ai Yori Aoshi
- Developer: KID
- Publisher: Success Corporation
- Genre: Visual novel
- Platform: PlayStation 2
- Released: June 23, 2005
- icon

Ai Yori Aoshi (藍より青し; lit. 'Bluer Than Indigo' (Note: The title is an extract from the Japanese proverb "ao wa ai yori idete ai yori aoshi" (青は藍より出でて藍より青し), literally "although blue dye comes from the indigo plant, it is bluer than indigo," but commonly translated as "the student has surpassed his teacher.")) is a Japanese manga series written and illustrated by Kou Fumizuki. The manga was serialized in Hakusensha's seinen manga magazine Young Animal magazine from 1998 to 2005 and the chapters collected into 17 tankōbon volumes. It is a love story between two characters who have not seen each other in years, but were once childhood friends.

An anime television series adaptation was animated by J.C.Staff and directed by Masami Shimoda, with Kenichi Kanemaki handling series composition, Kazunori Iwakura designing the characters and Toshio Masuda composing the music. The anime was broadcast on Fuji TV in 2002. A second season titled Ai Yori Aoshi: Enishi (藍より青し ～縁～) was set two years later and aired in 2003. There are 37 episodes total, counting an alternate-continuity Christmas special. The anime was released in North America by Geneon and the manga was released in English by Tokyopop. Four visual novels were also released for the PlayStation 2 and Windows 98.

== Plot ==
Kaoru Hanabishi, a university student, is the eldest son of Yūji Hanabishi, the head of the Hanabishi Zaibatsu, and was set to take over the zaibatsu after his father retired. His mother, Kumi Honjō, and his father never married, making life difficult for both him and his mother. Kaoru's father died when he was five years old. After that, Yūji's father, Gen'ichiro Hanabishi, took Kaoru under his wing and began educating him for the eventual succession. However, Kaoru never felt at home in the Hanabishi family and exiled himself after his mother's death. Day by day he felt alone, thinking that he was living life with no reason pushing him on.

There was, however, a person who loved Kaoru so much that she felt had to do whatever was necessary to be with him. Her name is Aoi Sakuraba. Aoi is the only daughter of the owner of the Sakuraba Dry Goods Store (later renamed to Sakuraba Department Store). Kaoru's family and Aoi's family had expected for Kaoru to marry Aoi, but after Kaoru left, the marriage was canceled. Both families had a friendly relationship, and unbeknownst to Kaoru, Aoi had been in love with him from the start. The Sakuraba family had already been searching for someone suitable, but Aoi was unwilling to marry someone else and walked out, chasing Kaoru.

Both were freed from their families' affairs but did not know how to make their living. Miyabi Kagurazaki, Aoi's caretaker, has Aoi live with her in a grand western-style summer mansion owned by the Sakuraba family, with Kaoru living in a house for servants next to it to prevent a scandal as with the previous. They are soon joined by Tina Foster, an American expatriate; Taeko Minazuki, a clumsy housekeeper; Mayu Miyuki, Kaoru's childhood friend; and Chika Minazuki, Taeko's cousin. The house is eventually converted to a dormitory and Aoi becomes its landlady.

Eventually, Miyabi helps Kaoru reconcile with the Hanabishis and patch up the original engagement. However, Kaoru's half brother attempts to gain control of the Hanabishi Zaibatsu by proposing to Aoi. After Kaoru foils the proposal, Aoi abandons her family name and Kaoru gives the ownership of Hanabishi Zaibatsu to his half-brother. Five years later, Kaoru and Aoi are married.

== Media ==
=== Manga ===
Ai Yori Aoshi began as a manga series written and illustrated by Kou Fumizuki. It was serialized in Hakusensha's seinen manga magazine Young Animal magazine from 1998 to 2005 and the chapters collected into 17 tankōbon volumes. The first volume was published by Hakusensha in Japan on May 28, 1999, and the last volume was released on December 20, 2005. The manga was released in English by Tokyopop. The first book was released in January 2004 and the last book was released in October 2007.

The series has also been licensed in Europe (Non English Releases), Asia, and Middle America. In Europe, the series was licensed in French by Pika Édition, in German by EMA, and in Spanish by Norma Editorial. For Asia the series was licensed in Chinese by Jonesky, in Korean by Daiwon CI, and in Russian by Sakura Press. In North America the series has been published in Mexico by Grupo Editorial Vid.

=== Anime ===
An anime television series adaptation animated by J.C.Staff, written by Kenichi Kanemaki, and directed by Masami Shimoda premiered on Fuji TV from April 10, 2002, to September 25, 2002, spanning twenty-four episodes. Most of the music for the series was composed by Toshio Masuda. Three pieces of theme music were used in the anime series. "Towa no Hana" (永遠の花; lit. Eternal Flower) performed by Yoko Ishida is the opening theme. "Na mo Shirenu Hana" (名も知れぬ花; lit. Unknown Flower) performed by The Indigo is the ending theme used for all the episodes except one; "I'll Be Home" performed by Satsuki Yukino is the ending theme for eighteenth episode. In Japan, it was released across eight Region 2 DVD compilation volumes. The anime was licensed by Geneon for an English-dubbed release in North America.

A second season titled Ai Yori Aoshi: Enishi (藍より青し ～縁～) aired from October 12, 2003, to December 28, 2003, spanning twelve episodes. The second season of anime adaptation uses three pieces of theme music. "Takaramono" (たからもの; lit. Treasure) performed by Yoko Ishida is the opening theme. "I Do!" is the first ending theme performed by The Indigo. "Presence" performed by The Indigo is the second ending theme. The series was released across three Region 2 DVD compilations in Japan. Geneon also licensed the second season in North America for an English-dubbed release.

A fifteen-minute OVA known variously as "Episode 00", "Beautiful Snow", and "Enishi Christmas Special" was released on September 26, 2003. The special was dubbed and released in English on the first North American Enishi DVD release.

At Anime Expo 2010, Funimation announced that they had licensed both seasons, and re-released them in 2011. Funimation released the complete series under the Anime Classics label in July 2012.

=== Video games ===
KID Corp. published a PlayStation 2 video game based on the series in 2003, and was released in English for Windows PCs by Hirameki International. That game was re-released in 2005 by Success Corporation with bonus footage and mini-games.

== Reception ==
Ai Yori Aoshi did well with its English manga release, with book one ranking number 45 on the top 50 manga sold of that month. With an estimated 3,329 books sold, the series peaked at number 18 of 100 with the sixth volume.

The manga has been described as "fun to read" and a "good solid romance story". Adam Beck of Advanced media Network anime pointed out, however, that some volumes lack dialogue but a good dialogue translation done by Tokyopop.

Christi from THEM Anime Reviews commented that anime adaptation has a "split personality", since on the one hand, "it wants to be a serious, dramatic romance with a dash of comedy", and on the other hand, "[it] wants to be a "One Guy/Lots of Girls slapstick harem show". Despite that, the anime was labeled as "stunning" with its artwork, and the theme music got a good review.
